= List of Tales of the Unexpected episodes =

Tales of the Unexpected is a British anthology series, which was broadcast on ITV from 1979 to 1988. Each episode features a dramatised story that has been adapted from the works of several well-known writers, most notably, Roald Dahl.

During the course of the programme, 112 episodes of Tales of the Unexpected aired over nine series, between 24 March 1979 and 13 May 1988.

== Series overview ==
| Series | Episodes | Originally released | |
| Series | Episodes | First released | Last released |
|---|---|---|---|
| 1 | 9 | 24 March 1979 | 19 May 1979 |
| 2 | 16 | 1 March 1980 | 14 June 1980 |
| 3 | 9 | 9 August 1980 | 19 December 1980 |
| 4 | 17 | 5 April 1981 | 26 December 1981 |
| 5 | 18 | 25 April 1982 | 2 January 1983 |
| 6 | 14 | 9 April 1983 | 3 September 1983 |
| 7 | 15 | 12 May 1984 | 21 October 1984 |
| 8 | 4 | 30 March 1985 | 28 July 1985 |
| 9 | 10 | 18 December 1987 | 13 May 1988 |

== Episodes ==
=== Series 1 (1979) ===
Nine episodes. First broadcast: Saturdays on ITV – 24 March to 19 May 1979

Series 1
| No. overall | No. in series | Title | Directed by | Written by | Original release date |
|---|---|---|---|---|---|
| 1 | 1 | "The Man from the South" | Michael Tuchner | Story by : Roald Dahl; Adaptation by : Kevin Goldstein-Jackson | 24 March 1979 |
A young couple on holiday in Jamaica meet a mysterious old gentleman who makes one of them a macabre wager. Cast: Angela Malcolm (Maid), Pamela Stephenson (Cathy), José Ferrer (Carlos), Michael Ontkean (Tommy), Cyril Luckham (Rawlsden), Katy Jurado (Mysterious Woman)
| 2 | 2 | "Mrs. Bixby and the Colonel's Coat" | Simon Langton | Story by : Roald Dahl; Adaptation by : Ronald Harwood | 31 March 1979 |
Unable to show her dentist husband Cyril the lavish mink fur coat her lover has given her, Mrs Bixby proceeds to hatch a clever plan. Cast: Will Leighton (Seamus), Richard Hampton (The Patient), Richard Greene (The Colonel), Michael Hordern (Cyril Bixby), Julie Harris (Mrs Bixby), Alan Chuntz (Taxi Driver), Sandra Payne (Miss Pulteney), Frederick Farley (Pawnbroker), Vass Anderson (Master of Hounds)
| 3 | 3 | "William and Mary" | Donald McWhinnie | Written by : Roald Dahl; Dramatisation by : Ronald Harwood | 7 April 1979 |
When her husband William dies, Mary Pearl is shocked that his will stipulates that his brain should be kept alive – with interesting results. Cast: Marius Goring (Dr Landy), Elaine Stritch (Mary Pearl), Frederick Farley (Baxter), Richard Hampton (Vicar), Jimmy Mac (Dr William Pearl), Jane Paton (Nurse)
| 4 | 4 | "Lamb to the Slaughter" | John Davies | Written by : Roald Dahl; Dramatisation by : Robin Chapman | 14 April 1979 |
When Mary kills her husband hitting him with a frozen leg of lamb, she must think quickly to hide the evidence. Cast: Michael Byrne (Patrick Marney), Brian Blessed (Detective Sergeant Jack Nolan), Susan George (Mary Marney), Mark Jones (Detective Sergeant Jameson), Andrew Fell (Uniformed Policeman), David English (Plain Clothes Policeman), George Little (Samuel), Hugh Cross (Police Doctor)
| 5 | 5 | "The Landlady" | Herbert Wise | Written by : Roald Dahl; Dramatisation by : Robin Chapman | 21 April 1979 |
When a young man arrives in Bath, he is shocked to find his seemingly charming landlady has a dark side. Cast: Siobhán McKenna (The Landlady), Leonard Preston (Billy Weaver), Anthony Dawes (The Clergyman), John Bryant (Mulholland), Jess Davies (Temple)
| 6 | 6 | "Neck" | Christopher Miles | Written by : Roald Dahl; Dramatisation by : Robin Chapman | 28 April 1979 |
A lady is cut down to size by her husband’s loyal butler when it is discovered she is having an affair. Cast: Michael Aldridge (Sir Basil Turton), Joan Collins (Lady Turton), John Gielgud (Jelks), Peter Bowles (Major Jack Haddock), Paul Herzberg (John Bannister), Carmen Silvera (Carmen La Rosa)
| 7 | 7 | "Edward the Conqueror" | Rodney Bennett | Written by : Roald Dahl; Dramatisation by : Ronald Harwood | 5 May 1979 |
When Edward grows tired of Louisa’s obsession with a stray cat and decides to get rid of it, Louisa exacts her revenge. Cast: Joseph Cotten (Edward), Wendy Hiller (Louisa), Phil Brown (F. Milton Willis)
| 8 | 8 | "A Dip in the Pool" | Michael Tuchner | Written by : Roald Dahl; Dramatisation by : Ronald Harwood | 12 May 1979 |
An American gambler must come up with a cunning plan to slow down a ship at sea in order to win a bet. Cast: Jack Weston (William Botibol), Gladys Spencer (Sylvia), Bill Reimbold (Bill Wilson), Elaine Ives-Cameron (Sarah Grant), Davyd Harries (Purser), Michael Troughton (Steward), Jana Shelden (Mrs Renshaw), Don Fellows (Renshaw), Paula Tilbrook (Maggie), David Healy (Auctioneer), Ken Buckle (Sailor)
| 9 | 9 | "The Way Up to Heaven" | Simon Langton | Written by : Roald Dahl; Dramatisation by : Ronald Harwood | 19 May 1979 |
Mrs. Foster exacts an intriguing revenge on her husband after his dawdling causes her to miss a flight. Cast: Julie Harris (Alice Foster), Angus MacKay (Walker), Julia Watson (Maid), Dulcie Huston (Hostess), Jeremy Longhurst (Driver), Brian Capron (Airport Official), Anthony Bailey (Arthur), Roland Culver (Eugene Foster)

=== Series 2 (1980) ===
Sixteen episodes. First broadcast: ITV – Saturdays 1 March to 14 June 1980

Series 2
| No. overall | No. in series | Title | Directed by | Written by | Original release date |
|---|---|---|---|---|---|
| 10 | 1 | "Royal Jelly" | Herbert Wise | Story by : Roald Dahl; Dramatisation by : Robin Chapman | 1 March 1980 |
Mabel’s baby is sick and her bee-obsessed husband thinks he has found a remedy. Will he get the baby buzzing back to health? Cast: Timothy West (Albert Taylor), Susan George (Mabel Taylor), Andrew Ray (Percy Hayward),
| 11 | 2 | "Skin" | Herbert Wise | Story by : Roald Dahl; Dramatisation by : Robin Chapman | 8 March 1980 |
An old street beggar, a former tattooist, was a friend of the famous artist, Soutine. On his back, he has a tattoo by the artist, which is now priceless. Cast: Lucy Gutteridge (Josie), Boris Isarov (Chaïm Soutine), Donald Pickering (Gallery Owner), Peggy Ashby (Rich Woman), Sabina Franklyn (Young Girl), David Webb (Chef), Derek Jacobi (Drioli)
| 12 | 3 | "Galloping Foxley" | Claude Whatham | Story by : Roald Dahl; Dramatisation by : Robin Chapman | 15 March 1980 |
A man starts to suffer when he becomes haunted by the memory of the brutal treatment he received in his childhood. Cast: Adrian Breeze (Boy), Guy Humphries (Stamford), Wayne Brooks (Boy), Timothy Breeze (Boy), Clifford Abrahams (Boy), Paul Spurrier (Young William Perkins), John Mills (William Perkins), Anthony Steel (Man on the Train), Anthony Woodruff (Housemaster), Jonathan Scott-Taylor (Young Bruce Foxley), Colin Thomas (City Gent)
| 13 | 4 | "The Hitch-Hiker" | Alastair Reid | Story by : Roald Dahl; Dramatisation by : Robin Chapman | 22 March 1980 |
When a driver picks up a hitch-hiker in his car, his journey turns into a thrilling ride. Cast: Cyril Cusack (Michael Fish), Rod Taylor (Paul Duveen), John Forgeham (Policeman)
| 14 | 5 | "Poison" | Graham Evans | Story by : Roald Dahl; Dramatisation by : Robin Chapman | 29 March 1980 |
A poisonous snake keeps a teacher prisoner in India. How can he escape from its evil glare? Cast: Andrew Ray (Harry Pope), Judy Geeson (Sandra), Saeed Jaffrey (Dr Kunzru Ganderbai), Anthony Steel (Timber Woods)
| 15 | 6 | "Fat Chance" | John Gorrie | Story by : Robert Bloch; Dramatisation by : Denis Cannan | 5 April 1980 |
A pharmacist tries to elope with his lover, but his larger than life wife stands in his way. Cast: Katie Flower (Amateur Actress), Peter Van Dissel (Amateur Actor), Nigel Caliburn (Stage Manager), Carol Thornton (Woman in Audience), Geoffrey Bayldon (Dr Applegate), John Castle (John Burge), Sheila Gish (Frances), Miriam Margolyes (Mary Burge), Anthony Roye (Director of Amateur Production), Mike Quinto (Man in Audience), Jean Kitson (Chemist's Assistant)
| 16 | 7 | "Taste" | Alastair Reid | Story by : Roald Dahl; Dramatisation by : Ronald Harwood | 12 April 1980 |
A dinner party takes a surprising turn when one pretentious guest is challenged to a wine-tasting contest. Cast: Ron Moody (Richard Pratt), William Hootkins (Peter Bligh), Mercia Glossop (Sybil Schofield), Antony Carrick (Mike Schofield), Debbie Farrington (Louise Schofield), Beth Porter (Joanna Bligh), Gabrielle Blunt (Mrs Adams)
| 17 | 8 | "My Lady Love, My Dove" | Herbert Wise | Story by : Roald Dahl; Dramatisation by : Ronald Harwood | 19 April 1980 |
When Pamela and Arthur invite a young couple over for the weekend, things take a surprising turn. Cast: Elaine Stritch (Pamela Beauchamp), Lisa Eichhorn (Sally Snape), Douglas Lambert (Henry Snape), Shane Rimmer (Arthur Beauchamp)
| 18 | 9 | "Georgy Porgy" | Graham Evans | Story by : Roald Dahl; Dramatisation by : Robin Chapman | 26 April 1980 |
George has problems with female attention, but when a beautiful woman joins his congregation things are set to change. Cast: Ann Beach (Miss Unwin), Lally Bowers (Miss Elphinstone), Grant Bardsley (George Duckworth as a child), Jacob Witkin (Boris Duckworth), Joan Collins (Clare Duckworth and Mrs Roach), John Alderton (Reverend George Duckworth), Peter Godfrey (Doctor), John Biggerstaff (Pollard), Margaretta Scott (Lady Birdwell)
| 19 | 10 | "Depart in Peace" | Alan Gibson | Story by : Roald Dahl; Dramatisation by : Ronald Harwood | 3 May 1980 |
Art dealer Lionel gets an artist to visualise his fiancée Janet nude and paint her accordingly. Janet, however, does not see the funny side. Cast: Joseph Cotten (Lionel), Gloria Grahame (Gladys Ponsonby), Maureen O'Brien (Janet de Pelagia), John Bennett (Royden), Peter Cellier (Wilkins)
| 20 | 11 | "The Umbrella Man" | Claude Whatham | Story by : Roald Dahl; Dramatisation by : Ronald Harwood | 10 May 1980 |
A con man arrives in town and starts his scam. Cast: Michael Gambon (Andrew), John Mills (The Umbrella Man), Michael Sheard (Inspector), John Rees (Clerk), Jennifer Hilary (Wendy), John Carson (Arthur)
| 21 | 12 | "Genesis and Catastrophe" | Herbert Wise | Story by : Roald Dahl; Dramatisation by : Ronald Harwood | 17 May 1980 |
A pregnant lady is worried that she may miscarry for the fourth time. Can her doctor reassure her? Cast: Helmut Griem (Alois), Hana Maria Pravda (Frau Lemner), Zhivila Roche (Klara), Alastair Llewellyn (Doctor), Graham Seed (Josef), Toby Waldock (Young Alois)
| 22 | 13 | "Mr Botibol's First Love" | John Gorrie | Story by : Roald Dahl; Dramatisation by : Kevin Goldstein-Jackson | 24 May 1980 |
A jaded businessman sells his company and attempts to change his life for the better by buying a strange piano. Cast: Paul Greenhalgh (Simpson), Anna Massey (Irene Wrzaszcyzk), Jack Weston (William Botibol), Alan Rowe (Clements), Allan Corduner (Store Assistant), Paul Bacon (Mason), Helen Ball (Flange Underwriter), John Flint (Workman)
| 23 | 14 | "Back for Christmas" | Giles Foster | Story by : John Collier; Dramatisation by : Denis Cannan | 31 May 1980 |
A philandering physician with an obsession for orchids cultivates a deadly plot to see off his wife. Laurence Payne (Party Guest), Richard Johnson (Dr James Carpenter), Siân Phillips (Hermione Carpenter), Artro Morris (Pathologist), Avril Elgar (Pathologist's Wife), Cyril Luckham (Consultant), Lynne Ross (Samantha), Andrew Lebas (Waiter)
| 24 | 15 | "The Orderly World of Mr Appleby" | John Gorrie | Story by : Stanley Ellin; Dramatisation by : Robin Chapman | 7 June 1980 |
A man married three times might be lucky for the fourth time when he meets a new interest. Cast: Robert Lang (Arthur Appleby), Cyril Luckham (Gainsborough), Elizabeth Spriggs (Martha Appleby), Christopher Bramwell (Dominic), Nigel Caliburn (Signwriter)
| 25 | 16 | "The Man at the Top" | Claude Whatham | Story by : Edward D. Hoch; Dramatisation by : Denis Cannan | 14 June 1980 |
A young out-of-work seaman kills another man in a botched robbery. Convinced the police will trace the knife used back to him, he turns to his friend, Diane, for help. Cast: Terry Gurry (Bodyguard with dog), Michael Ripper (Taxi Driver), Rex Taylor (Doorman), John Rees (Barman), Johnny Shannon (Barman), Meredith Saxon (Bodyguard), Peter Firth (Hardy), Rachel Davies (Diane), Norman Clive-Fisher (Darts Player), Betty Hardy (Motherly Woman), Dallas Cavell (Sam Madrid), Cassie McFarlane (Estelle), Paul McDowell (Shaefer), Brian Dooley (Lawyer), Mimi de Braie (Maria)

=== Series 3 (1980) ===
Nine episodes. First broadcast: Saturdays, Sundays and a Friday on ITV – 9 to 30 August and 9 November to 19 December 1980

Series 3
| No. overall | No. in series | Title | Directed by | Written by | Original release date |
|---|---|---|---|---|---|
| 26 | 1 | "The Flypaper" | Graham Evans | Story by : Elizabeth Taylor; Dramatisation by : Robin Chapman | 9 August 1980 |
With a 12-year-old found dead and a killer perhaps on the loose, a young girl becomes paranoid. Cast: Stephanie Cole (Miss Harrison), Alfred Burke (Herbert), Lorna Yabsley (Sylvia Wilkinson), Pat Keen (Vera), Peggy Thorpe-Bates (Mrs. Wilkinson), Bernadette Windsor (Louise), Giles Phibbs (Bus Conductor)
| 27 | 2 | "A Picture of a Place" | Giles Foster | Story by : Doug Morgan; Dramatisation by : Denis Cannan | 16 August 1980 |
Hazel is an elderly widow who lives in a farmhouse full of antiques. When a conman arrives he dupes her into selling him a picture at a knock-down price. Cast: Michael Troughton (Andrew), Bill Maynard (Merv), Jessie Matthews (Hazel), Judy Riley (Lucy), Peter Sallis (Solicitor)
| 28 | 3 | "Proof of Guilt" | Chris Lovett | Story by : Bill Pronzini; Dramatisation by : Johnny Byrne | 23 August 1980 |
George is denying murder, even though he was in a locked room with the victim when he was shot. Inspector Walters just cannot find any evidence against him. Cast: Jeremy Clyde (George Stamford), Roy Marsden (Chief Inspector Walters), Dudley Sutton (Detective Sergeant Jack Sherrard), Peter Macklen (P. C. Harris), Richard Barnes (Charles Hearn), Brian Dooley (Forensic Scientist), Geoffrey Lumsden (Solicitor), Elizabeth Richardson (Clarissa Tower), John Gill (Alec McTaggart)
| 29 | 4 | "Vengeance is Mine Inc." | Alan Gibson | Roald Dahl | 30 August 1980 |
Mrs Wilbur gets more than she bargained for when she calls upon the unusual services of Brit and Canadian Tom and George, two starving writers turned entrepreneurs. Cast: Julian Fellowes (George), Betsy Blair (Mrs Wilbur), Virginia Clay (Landlady), Robert Mill (Lionel Brewster), Morris Barry (Wilbur), James Greene (Garage Attendant), Mary Cornford (Theresa Burton), Terry Walsh (Bouncer), Bosco Hogan (Tom), Stephen Boswell (Doorman), Fiesta Mei Ling (Suky)
| 30 | 5 | "A Girl Can't Always Have Everything" | Graham Evans | Story by : Tonita S. Gardner; Dramatisation by : Julian Bond | 9 November 1980 |
Struggling actresses Suzy and Pat meet Herbert, a wealthy widower. Seductive Suzy enjoys his money, but things soon do not look so rosy. Cast: Peter Tuddenham (Vicar), Sylvester Williams (Messenger), Ryan Michael (Handsome Man), Richard Foxton (Stage Manager), Nancy Nevinson (Grand Lady), Joan Collins (Suzy Starr), Pauline Collins (Pat Lewis), Brewster Mason (Herbert Millette), James Faulkner (Patrick)
| 31 | 6 | "Parson's Pleasure" | John Bruce | Story by : Roald Dahl; Dramatisation by : Ronald Harwood | 30 November 1980 |
Cyril makes a profitable living as a rogue antiques dealer, but when he buys a farmer’s valuable furniture his luck may be about to run out. Cast: John Gielgud (Cyril Boggis), Bernard Miles (Rummins), Lee Montague (Storker), Godfrey James (Claud), Irlin Hall (Lady), Harry Jones (Bert Rummins), Roger Milner (Hawkins), Virginia Clay (Housekeeper)
| 32 | 7 | "The Stinker" | Alan Gibson | Story by : Julian Symons; Dramatisation by : Julian Bond | 7 December 1980 |
When millionaire Jack runs into Harold, a boy he bullied at school, he gives him a job. But Harold soon suspects his wife of having an affair with his new boss. Cast: Colin Hodges (Boy), Harvey Hillyer (Boy), David Carlton-Young (Boy), Robin Keston (Boy), Russell Gleed (Boy), Denholm Elliott (Colonel Harold Tinker), Joss Ackland (Jack Cutler), Diane Holland (Blanche Cutler), Tim Bentinck (Meech), Patricia Quinn (Phyl Tinker)
| 33 | 8 | "I'll Be Seeing You" | Philip Dudley | Story by : Robert Quigley; Dramatisation by : Julian Bond | 14 December 1980 |
When Roland leaves his cruel, millionairess wife Vivien for a fresh start with his mistress Anna, the snubbed spouse plans to make his life a living hell. Cast: Robin Marchal (Clinker), Bryan Andrews (Police Inspector), Roger Brierley (Jack Parsons), Pauline Letts (Joan Wilcox), Patricia Mort (Olive Parsons), Alan Foss (Hector Wilcox), Murray Ewan (Professor George Coburn), Amanda Redman (Anna Warrack), Hilary Tindall (Vivien Trent), Anthony Valentine (Roland Trent)
| 34 | 9 | "The Party" | Giles Foster | Story by : Doug Morgan; Dramatisation by : Chaim Bermant | 19 December 1980 |
When disgruntled factory manager Harry is left feeling undervalued by his colleagues, he decides to take revenge. Cast: Raymond Francis (Peckham), Mary Tovey (Mrs Peckham), Michael Nagel (Noel), Janthea Williams (Sue), Olivier Pierre (Leclerc), Robert Morley (Harry Knox), Joyce Redman (Linda Knox), Amanda Redman (Pat), Leonard Preston (Leighton)

=== Series 4 (1981) ===
Seventeen episodes. First broadcast: Sundays and a Saturday on ITV – 5 April to 26 July and 26 December 1981.

Series 4
| No. overall | No. in series | Title | Directed by | Written by | Original release date |
|---|---|---|---|---|---|
| 35 | 1 | "Would You Believe It?" | Barry Davies | Story by : Robert Edmond Alter; Dramatisation by : Julian Bond | 5 April 1981 |
Two archeologists working in Jordan get more than they bargained for when they decide to smuggle the statue of a mysterious woman over the border to Israel. Cast: Nigel Havers (Miller), Richard Johnson (Tanner), Christopher Blake (Israeli Officer), Tony Alleff (Hassin), Vic Tablian (Arab Officer), Albert Moses (Arab Patrolman), Ali Baba (Arab Digger), Paul Satvender (Arab Digger), Tapan Ghosh (Arab Digger), Raja Ali (Arab Digger)
| 36 | 2 | "Vicious Circle" | Philip Dudley | Story by : Donald Honig; Dramatisation by : Robin Chapman | 12 April 1981 |
When an elderly lady catches a burglar trying to rob her she decides to help him go straight, but when he refuses to change she has to take a different approach. Cast: Patrick Field (Rex Tobin), Siobhán McKenna (Mrs Grady), Lesley Goldie (Mrs Jackson), Graham Weston (Police Superintendent), Kenneth Hadley (Plain-Clothes Policeman), Roger Evans (Policeman), Forbes Collins (Policeman)
| 37 | 3 | "The Boy who Talked with Animals" | Alan Gibson | Story by : Roald Dahl; Dramatisation by : Robin Chapman | 19 April 1981 |
When David rescues a giant turtle, it looks as though he's found a new friend. But there could be more to his pet than meets the eye. Cast: Paul Spurrier (David), Stuart Whitman (Sam Jenner), David Buck (David's Father), John Nettleton (Graham Edwards, Hotel Manager), Robert Arden (Berners), John Wyman (Denzil), Mel Taylor (Fisherman), Tony Osoba (Policeman), Amanda Kemp (Denzil's Girlfriend), Oscar James (Fisherman), William Hootkins (Harry Chester), Vivien Heilbron (David's Mother).
| 38 | 4 | "The Best of Everything" | John Bruce | Story by : Stanley Ellin; Dramatisation by : Denis Cannan | 26 April 1981 |
Desperate to win the affections of his boss’s daughter, Arthur feels he needs style and enlists the suave Charlie for his wardrobe. Cast: Judi Bowker (Ann Horton), Michael Kitchen (Arthur), Jeremy Clyde (Charlie Prince), Rachel Kempson (Mrs Marsh), Brewster Mason (Horton), David Arlen (White Postman), Carl Andrews (Black Postman), Andrew MacLachlan (Metal Dealer), Peter Bartle (Metal Dealer), Judy Liebert (Metal Dealer), Richard Barnes (Metal Dealer)
| 39 | 5 | "A Woman's Help" | Bert Salzman | Story by : Henry Slesar; Dramatisation by : Bert Salzman | 3 May 1981 |
Henpecked Arnold decides to get rid of his demanding wife once and for all, so long as he gets his money. Unfortunately, his wife has a few secrets of her own... Cast: Anthony Franciosa (Arnold Bourdon), Shirley Knight (Elizabeth Bourdon), Deborah Geffner (Miss Greco), Annie McGreevey (Nurse), Imogene Bliss (Mother), Ian Martin (Dr Ivey), Raymond Thorne (Gardener)
| 40 | 6 | "Shatterproof" | John Jacobs | Story by : Jack Ritchie; Dramatisation by : Pat Hoddinott | 10 May 1981 |
Property millionaire Gerry Williams has a beautiful wife, but she no longer loves him. An assassin is hired, but he soon becomes friendly with Gerry. Cast: Eli Wallach (Gerry Williams), Anthony Pullen Shaw (Smith), Caroline Langrishe (Ellen), Godfrey Talbot (Emerson), Bridget McConnel (Mrs Emerson)
| 41 | 7 | "The Sound Machine" | John Gorrie | Written by : Roald Dahl; Dramatisation by : Ronald Harwood | 17 May 1981 |
A botanist has invented a machine that translates the sound of plants into speech. What he hears gives him a shock. Cast: James Warwick (Dr Scott), Harry Andrews (Klausner), Margery Mason (Mrs Saunders)
| 42 | 8 | "Never Speak Ill of the Dead" | John Gorrie | Written by : John Collier; Dramatisation by : Robin Chapman | 24 May 1981 |
David is accused of murder when his wife Irene vanishes, Her promiscuous lifestyle made her the talk of the town but the gossip has escalated. Cast: Warren Clarke (Bob Streeter), Colin Blakely (Dr David Rankin), Cheryl Hall (Irene Rankin), Keith Drinkel (Sim Hoskins), Brian Osborne (Police Sergeant)
| 43 | 9 | "The Best Policy" | Ray Danton | Story by : Ferenc Molnár; Dramatisation by : David Scott Milton | 31 May 1981 |
Harry’s integrity and hard work have earned him a promotion at the bank. But despite his immaculate accounts, Harry is accused of embezzlement. Cast: Gary Burghoff (Harry Flock), Deborah Harmon (Daisy Flock), Logan Ramsey (Philbert), William Boyett (Simpson), Edward Grover (Bailout), Robert Casper (Wheatley), Penelope Gillette (Mrs Runion), Damian London (Grunge), Tad Horino (Coroner)
| 44 | 10 | "The Last Bottle in the World" | John Gorrie | Story by : Stanley Ellin; Dramatisation by : Denis Cannan | 7 June 1981 |
Kyros plans on giving his wife a priceless bottle of wine for their anniversary but he has no intention of drinking to her health. Cast: Anthony Quayle (Kyros Kassoulas), Gary Bond (Max de Marechall), Nigel Hawthorne (Charles Drummond), Lynette Davies (Sophie Kassoulas), Neville Phillips (Waiter), Carlos Douglas (Assistant Chef), Pat Lewis (Miss Pym), Claude Le Saché (Waiter)
| 45 | 11 | "Kindly Dig Your Grave" | Alan Gibson | Story by : Stanley Ellin; Dramatisation by : Robin Chapman | 14 June 1981 |
The unscrupulous Madame Lagrue runs an art gallery, exploiting young artists. But she finally gets her comeuppance. Cast: Micheline Presle (Madame Lagrue), Celia Gregory (Fatima), R. H. Thomson (Graham MacKenzie), Gerard Lartigau (Henri), Alan Gifford (Edward), Helen Horton (Martha), Helen Ball (Satan's Caretaker)
| 46 | 12 | "Completely Foolproof" | John Jacobs | Story by : Robert Arthur Jr. Dramatisation by : Robin Chapman | 21 June 1981 |
Wealthy New Yorker Joe Brisson is a self-made man with a plan to kill his disgruntled wife. Unfortunately for him, she has some deadly plans of her own. Cast: Telly Savalas (Joe Brisson), Rita Gam (Lisa), Ramsay Williams (Howard Duncombe), Belinda Mayne (Anna Kleiber), Linda Liles (Miss Graham), Douglas Lambert (Harrington)
| 47 | 13 | "There's One Born Every Minute" | Philip Dudley | Story by : Bill Pronzini; Dramatisation by : Chaim Bermant | 28 June 1981 |
Arthur and Margaret are a quiet couple. When Margaret inherits £50,000, Arthur reluctantly agrees to gamble it all on a dubious property deal. The title is a reference to the phrase "There's a sucker born every minute". Cast: Frank Finlay (Arthur Pearson), Heather Sears (Margaret Pearson), Peter Copley (Man at Railway Station), Andrew Burt (Edward), Jo Rowbottom (Joy), Deryck Guyler (Commissionaire), Kevin Brennan (Grimshaw), Allan Mitchell (Detective Sergeant)
| 48 | 14 | "Bosom Friends" | Graham Evans | Story by : Dana Lyon; Dramatisation by : Robin Chapman | 5 July 1981 |
Nell and Emma are old friends who are reunited after years apart. However, things turn sour when the penniless Emma looks to drag Nell down into poverty with her. Nell's plan to get rid of her backfires. Cast: Rachel Kempson (Nell), Joan Greenwood (Emma), Nat Jackley (Deacon), Aaron Shirley (Brown), Patricia Browning (Ward Sister)
| 49 | 15 | "A Glowing Future" | John Peyser | Story by : Ruth Rendell; Dramatisation by : Ross Thomas | 19 July 1981 |
Jack and Betsy are lovers. That is until Jack decides to go halfway across the world to be with his new Australian lover. However, Betsy is not going to make it easy. Cast: John Beck (Jack), Joanna Pettet (Betsy), Bill Lavoie (Removal Man)
| 50 | 16 | "The Way to Do It" | Alan Gibson | Story by : Jack Ritchie; Dramatisation by : Denis Cannan | 26 July 1981 |
The casino offers Roger an escape from his domineering aunt. He has a love for both gambling and a pretty hostess. But the casino boss has a score to settle. Cast: Andrew Ray (Roger Carson), Elaine Paige (Suzie), Elizabeth Spriggs (Aunt May), Sarah Webb (Jackie), Martin Benson (Vasco), Annie Leon (Miss Stevens), Forbes Collins (Commissionaire), Andrew MacLachlan (Police Sergeant).
| 51 | 17 | "Hijack" | Herbert Wise | Story by : Robert L. Fish; Dramatisation by : Denis Cannan | 26 December 1981 |
A hijacker on an aeroplane takes a stewardess hostage before demanding a million dollars and a parachute. Will Captain Waterhouse give in to his demands? Cast: Simon Cadell (Co-pilot), Suzanne Danielle (Millie), Denis Quilley (Captain Waterhouse), Sean Barrett (Steward), Peter Tuddenham (Airport Security Officer), Matthew Long (Second Security Officer), Richard Foxton (Security Guard), John Graham (Scottish Passenger), William Merrow (German Passenger), Neville Phillips (English Passenger), Douglas Lambert (American Passenger), Helen Horton (American Passenger)

=== Series 5 (1982–1983) ===
Eighteen episodes. First broadcast: Sundays on ITV – 25 April 1982 to 2 January 1983

Series 5
| No. overall | No. in series | Title | Directed by | Written by | Original release date |
|---|---|---|---|---|---|
| 52 | 1 | "Blue Marigold" | Giles Foster | Story by : Aileen Wheeler; Dramatisation by : Robin Chapman | 25 April 1982 |
Blue Marigold is the face of a new perfume, but not the voice. She goes crazy when a nice voice is dubbed over her common London accent. Then, dropped by her agency for her diva-like behaviour, supermodel Marigold’s mental health deteriorates, and she is placed in an asylum for 12 years. Years later, she is released and meets both her voice-over and her ex-partner, with whom she now lives. Cast: Edward Jewesbury (Psychiatrist), Stephen Bent (Car Dealer), Ralph Bates (Paul Foster), Sharon Duce (Sophie Trent), Helen Fraser (Beryl), Toyah Willcox (Marigold), Billy Hamon (Bryan Sabotier), Paul Seed (Director of Commercial)
| 53 | 2 | "The Eavesdropper" | John Gorrie | Story by : Ruth Wissmann; Dramatisation by : Robin Chapman | 2 May 1982 |
Moira hears a woman discussing a trip to Paris with her lover, Donald. Not only is her husband called Donald, but he was in France Last week. Coincidence? Cast: Michael Craig (Donald Henderson), Dorothy Tutin (Moira Henderson), Sheila Ruskin (Louise), Bernice Stegers (Kaye), Rosalyn Elvin (Waitress), Ronnie Stevens (Jeweller), Neil Daglish (Young Man), Lill Roughley (Blonde Girl)
| 54 | 3 | "Operation Safecrack" | Alan Gibson | Story by : Henry Slesar; Dramatisation by : Robin Chapman | 9 May 1982 |
In an attempt to prove their safes are impregnable, a company challenges ex-safebreaker Sam to crack one for a cash prize. But are his skills sharp enough? Cast: John Mills (Sam Morrissey), June Ritchie (Jenny Morrissey), David Healy (Jack Harrison), Edward Burnham (Henry Bliss), Eliza Buckingham (Reporter and Voice of Stewardess), Rachel Laurence (Hilda), David Hanson (Winford Stark), Jason Norman (Billy Thompson), Richard Everett (Television Director), Nick Diprose (Floor Manager)
| 55 | 4 | "Run, Rabbit, Run" | John Jacobs | Story by : John Bakkenhoven; Dramatisation by : Robin Chapman | 16 May 1982 |
Robert visits a couple who housed him during the war. But in Paris, he discovers that the husband has died, and the hero’s wife has a big secret to tell. Cast: Leslie Caron (Nathalie Vareille), James Aubrey (Robert Simpson), Constantine Gregory (Jacques Vareille), Bernadette Windsor (Young Girl)
| 56 | 5 | "Stranger in Town" | Wendy Toye | Story by : Sidney Carroll | 23 May 1982 |
A stranger arrives in town and soon endears himself to the local community – although his motives prove sinister. A remake of The Stranger Left No Card. Cast: Jean Kitson (Secretary), Bruce Clark (The Boy), Jennifer Connelly (The Girl), Clive Swift (Latham), Robbie MacNab (Hotel Receptionist), Stuart Howard (News-stand boy), Giles Phibbs (Foreman), Derek Jacobi (Sir Columbus)
| 57 | 6 | "The Moles" | Peter Hammond | Story by : J. J. Maling; Dramatisation by : Chaim Bermant | 6 June 1982 |
Two cash-strapped business owners tunnel their way into a bank – only to find they missed a crucial notice on the door. Cast: Fulton Mackay (Edward Boyle), Bill Owen (Meakins), Harry H. Corbett (George Balsam), Joe Gladwin (Heeney), Avril Elgar (Thelma Boyle)
| 58 | 7 | "Decoy" | John Jacobs | Story by : Victor Edwards; Dramatisation by : Chaim Bermant | 21 August 1982 |
When a woman is murdered in a park, Constable Mary Bryan is used as bait to catch the suspected killer. But what if she is tracking the wrong man? Cast: Susan Penhaligon (W. P. C. Mary Bryan), Tim Woodward (Anthony Burton), Paul Antrim (Mike), Ian MacKenzie (Police Draughtsman), Harold Reese (Pathologist), Ian Redford (Detective Sergeant Harvey), Tom Cotcher (Detective Sergeant Talbot), Frank Wylie (Chief Inspector McLintock)
| 59 | 8 | "Pattern of Guilt" | Herbert Wise | Story by : Helen Nielsen; Dramatisation by : Robin Chapman | 5 September 1982 |
Police doctor Keith Briscoe is desperate to leave his wife for an ex but loses hope when she refuses to divorce him. Then, a serial killer gives him an idea. Cast: Peter Egan (Keith Briscoe), Suzanne Danielle (Elaine Briscoe), Jennie Linden (Faye Briscoe), Andrew Manson (Young Man), Harry Webster (Old Man), Bernard Kay (Detective Sergeant Jim Gordon), Andrew Hilton (Plain Clothes Police Officer), Brett Forrest (Gerald), Neil Hutchings (Mark Briscoe), Darren Michael (John Briscoe)
| 60 | 9 | "A Harmless Vanity" | Giles Foster | Story by : Theda O'Henle; Dramatisation by : Jeremy Paul | 12 September 1982 |
When Mary learns her husband is having an affair, she invites her rival to a beach party. But the evening does not turn out as she expected. Cast: Keith Barron (George Hitchman), Phoebe Nicholls (Carol), Sheila Gish (Mary Hitchman), Suzanne Worsley (Girl Lover), Colin Farrell (Dave Ferguson), Michael Nagel (Lifeguard), Carol MacReady (Liz Ferguson), Chas Bryer (Frogman), Michael Speake (Television Announcer)
| 61 | 10 | "Death Can Add" | Graham Evans | Story by : Philip Ketchum; Dramatisation by : Johnny Byrne | 19 September 1982 |
An auditor finds out that Oliver is defrauding his firm. But when he demands some hush money, he discovers that Oliver has a nasty surprise in store. Cast: Geoffrey Chater (James Hamilton), Frank Gatliff (Thomas Keyes), Jan Francis (Leila Graham), Michael N. Harbour (Oliver Platt), Roland Culver (Sir Alex Bullen), Ian Holm (Alan Corwin)
| 62 | 11 | "Light Fingers" | John Peyser | Story by : Henry Slesar; Dramatisation by : Ross Thomas | 17 October 1982 |
Tired of gloves vanishing from his factory, Ralph hires a detective. Then, when he tells his wife about the thefts, gloves begin appearing in unexpected places. Cast: Tom Bosley (Ralph Stackpole), Janet Leigh (Joan Stackpole), Kenneth Tigar (Semple), Frank Sinatra Jr. (Cotter), Penelope Gillette (Gladys Miton)
| 63 | 12 | "Death in the Morning" | John Gorrie | Story by : Zia Kruger; Dramatisation by : John Gorrie | 31 October 1982 |
Karen marries a rich landowner with a huge house in the country. But after moving in, she senses an evil spirit... and it's out to get her. Cast: Cherie Lunghi (Karen Masterson), Moray Watson (Sir Ian Masterson), Carol Drinkwater (Linda Larch), Alan Rowe (Duncan Larch), Hilary Mason (Mrs Pardoe), Richard Austin (Paul Masterson), John Stamp (Williams)
| 64 | 13 | "What Have You Been Up To Lately?" | Herbert Wise | Story by : George Baxt; Dramatisation by : Denis Cannan | 14 November 1982 |
Richard and Fergus meet after 25 years. Pondering the girl they both loved, they discover that their marriages and careers have failed. Cast: Maggie Fitzgibbon (Melissa Mellor), Peter Barkworth (Richard Mellor), Benjamin Whitrow (Fergus Locke), June Watson (Audrey Locke), Fanny Rowe (Actress), Helen Ball (Death Star Roofing Sub-Contractor), Angela Harding (Cathleen)
| 65 | 14 | "The Absence of Emily" | Alan Gibson; John Rosenberg | Story by : Jack Ritchie; Dramatisation by : Denis Cannan | 21 November 1982 |
Norma owns a big house and lets her sister Emily and her husband live there. But when Emily disappears, Norma makes too much fuss... Cast: Anthony Valentine (Bob), Frances Tomelty (Norma), Susan Tracy (Emily), Patsy Byrne (Jean), Patrick McAlinney (Landlord), William Moore (Crisp), Derek Anders (Goff), Diana King (Ruth)
| 66 | 15 | "In the Bag" | Bert Salzman | Story by : Robert L. Fish; Dramatization by Bert Salzman | 28 November 1982 |
Cara is determined to get back her family jewels, which have been hidden away in a safe. Hiring a safe cracker, she goes along with him undercover. Cast: Edward Albert (Sam Crawford), Terry O'Quinn (Cop), Lou Jacobi (Waiter), Roxanne Hart (Cara), Michael A. Candela (Gardener)
| 67 | 16 | "A Man with a Fortune" | Herbert Wise | Story by : Peter Lovesey; Dramatisation by : Alan Seymour | 5 December 1982 |
A rich and lonely American ventures to England in search of his long-lost family. But when he meets Jane and her flatmate Eva, things begin to go wrong. Cast: Shane Rimmer (John Smith), Cyd Hayman (Janet Murdoch), Elizabeth Richardson (Eva), Peter Tuddenham (Tommy), Donald Eccles (Vicar), Nigel Greaves (Waiter), Jean Kitson (Clerk)
| 68 | 17 | "Who's Got the Lady?" | Peter Hammond | Story by : Jack Ritchie; Dramatisation by : Jeremy Paul | 12 December 1982 |
When a piece of art is stolen, the gallery owner gets his girlfriend to make copies of it to sell. But did the work really leave the building? Cast: Timothy Carlton (Walter Jameson), Gladys Spencer (Old Lady), Richard Johnson (Parnell), Robert Beatty (Amos Pulver), Victoria Tennant (Bernice), Vincent Wong (Japanese Art Collector), Michael Forrest (Detective Chief Superintendent Nelson), Neil Daglish (Heath), Laurence Payne (Hollingwood), Peter Howell (Louis Kendall), Olivier Pierre (Andre Arnaud)
| 69 | 18 | "The Skeleton Key" | Alan Gibson | Story by : Graham Sutton; Dramatisation by : Roy Russell | 2 January 1983 |
A woman discovers a nasty side to her boyfriend's personality when he goes into the hospital before a holiday. Cast: Julie Dawn Cole (Emma), John Duttine (Max), Peter Jeffrey (Stewart), Peter Machin (Andy), Tony Osoba (Dr Hartley)

=== Series 6 (1983) ===
Fourteen episodes.

Series 6
| No. overall | No. in series | Title | Directed by | Written by | Original release date |
|---|---|---|---|---|---|
| 70 | 1 | "A Passing Opportunity" | Graham Evans | Story by : Donald Honig; Adaptation by : Alan Seymour | 9 April 1983 |
Frank is struggling financially and will do anything for money. When he meets a rich and successful schoolmate, he realises it may even stretch to murder. Cast: Guy Bertrand (Manservant), Paul Davies-Prowles (Timmy Jesmond), Charles Keating (Peter Madison), Janette Legge (Eleanor Jesmond), Mark Lewis (Showroom Manager), Bryan Marshall (Frank Jesmond), George Sewell (Laughlin)
| 71 | 2 | "The Memory Man" | Peter Duffell | Story by : Henry Slesar; Dramatisation by : Denis Cannan | 16 April 1983 |
Down on his luck, 'Memory Man' Colin agrees to help a shady character remember the number of a station locker. But then Colin becomes too curious for his own good. Cast: Judy Geeson (Mary), Colin Blakely (Colin Mearns), Bernard Cribbins (Charlie Krebs and Mr King), Johnny Vyvyan (Small Man), John Biggerstaff (Tobacconist), John Judd (Police Inspector)
| 72 | 3 | "A Sad Loss" | John Gorrie | Story by : Patricia Moyes; Dramatisation by : James Andrew Hall | 23 April 1983 |
Claire Hawksworth runs a Caribbean hotel with her boyfriend, but they have fallen on tough times. Hopeful of some money, Claire turns to her rich aunt. Her aunt, however, tells her of a new heir to her fortune. Cast: Bazil Otoin (Desk Clerk), Heinz Bernard (Charlie), Lally Bowers (Alicia Hawksworth), Elizabeth Bradley (Mrs Bradley), Hayley Mills (Claire Hawksworth), Stuart Wilson (Dave Brigham), Phyllida Law (Maggie Patton), Ronny Cush (Harry), Major Wiley (Police Inspector), Iris Iverson (Hotel Guest), Chris Allen (Hotel Guest), Richard Markin (Hotel Guest), Jean Channon (Hotel Guest), Juliette James (Hotel Guest)
| 73 | 4 | "Clerical Error" | Graham Evans | Story by : Peter Ransley & James Gould Cozzens; Dramatisation by : Richard Huggett | 30 April 1983 |
Paul Standing, the son of a recently deceased doctor, is sorting out his paperwork when he receives a bill from a bookshop for thousands of pounds worth of pornography. Paul is highly suspicious. Cast: David Webb (Ronnie Carey), Richard Pearson (Michael Carey), Evelyn Laye (Mrs Standing), Hugh Fraser (Paul Standing)
| 74 | 5 | "Heir Presumptuous" | Philip Leacock | Story by : C.B. Gilford; Dramatisation by : Ross Thomas | 7 May 1983 |
George Devon, a wealthy rancher, is found murdered. His identical twin nephews stand to inherit his fortune, but one of them was seen at the scene of the crime. Both have alibis and no one can tell the two boys apart. Cast: Royce D. Applegate (Deputy Eddie Ream), Tara Buckman (Sally Fenton), David Cassidy (Donald and David), Ann Doran (Mary Deacon), Darren McGavin (Sheriff Milt Singleton), Robert Snively (George Devon)
| 75 | 6 | "Where's Your Sense of Humour?" | Leonard Lewis | Story by : Peter Ransley; Dramatisation by : Patricia McGerr | 14 May 1983 |
George Forester is a compulsive prankster. His wife and friends have been victims for many years until one day he goes too far. Cast: Sheila Gish (Laura Parker), Philip Jackson (George Forester), Penelope Nice (Julie Forester), Tom Chadbon (Frank Parker), Scott Saunders (Young Parker), Penelope Fischer (Carol), John King (Bob)
| 76 | 7 | "Down Among the Sheltering Palms" | John Gorrie | Story by : John Gorrie | 21 May 1983 |
Gerry Armstrong, an American soldier in World War II, returns after 40 years to Norfolk, where he was based. While there, he attends a dance and meets a beautiful woman, but she is not all she seems to be. Cast: Geoffrey Bayldon (Sid), Anne Carroll (Lena), Margaret Courtenay (Marge), Christopher Fulford (Bill), Gabrielle Hamilton (Doris), Van Johnson (Gerry T. Armstrong), Barry McCarthy (Jeff), Vanessa Paine (Carol)
| 77 | 8 | "The Vorpal Blade" | John Jacobs | Story by : Edward D. Hoch; Dramatisation by : Robin Chapman | 28 May 1983 |
Sitting on a garden bench, an old man called von Baden discusses with a friend an academic fencing duel that took place 50 years ago in Heidelberg, Germany. He has kept secret the events surrounding the death of one of the combatants, but now wants to relate what really happened. Cast: Peter Cushing (von Baden), Dean Allen (Duellist), John Bailey (Winterluck), Steve Brigden (Fifth student), Andrew Bicknell (Macker), Matthew Francis (Young von Baden), Michael Gardiner (Second student), Denys Graham (Doctor), Anthony Higgins (Cassan), Barrie Jaimeson (Josef), Kirstie Pooley (Eva), Nicholas Hall (First student), Brian Binns (Third student), John Rankin (Fourth student)
| 78 | 9 | "The Wrong 'Un" | Leonard Lewis | Story by : Michael Brett; Dramatisation by : Paul Ableman | 11 June 1983 |
A German businessman is staying at a hotel and in mood for celebration. He meets up with Molly, an attractive but strange girl. Despite being warned about her, he takes her to his room. Cast: Andrew Ray (Cranmer Oakes), Richard Foxton (Assistant Manager), Constantine Gregory (Helmut Kohler Weinrich), Lucy Gutteridge (Molly), Elspeth March (Mrs Carson), Daragh O'Malley (Jimmy), Graham Weston (Business man), Carrie Lee Baker (Sally, the maid), Alpana Sengupta (Cynthia)
| 79 | 10 | "The Luncheon" | Graham Evans | Story by : Jeffrey Archer; Dramatisation by : Gerald Savory | 18 June 1983 |
Susan Mandeville is a beautiful American woman who takes a shine to struggling writer Tony Medway. He takes her out to lunch in the hope of getting a lucrative offer for his book, but things are not so straightforward. Cast: Stephen Greif (Rinaldo), Jacqueline Hill (Melanie Litmayer), Gayle Hunnicutt (Susan Mandeville), Bosco Hogan (Tony Medway), Hazel McBride (Louise Medway), Burnell Tucker (Peter Blundell), Gertrude Shilling (Miss Sopwith), Barbara Molyneux (Lady Handel), Martin Ryan Grace (Wayne), John Cassady (Shaun), Shireen Anwar (Bank Teller), Mark Lewis (Carlo), Nicholas Field (Mario), Stuart Turton (Franco), Patrick Bailey (Dieter)
| 80 | 11 | "The Tribute" | Graham Evans | Story by : Jane Gardam; Dramatisation by : Alan Seymour | 25 June 1983 |
Three former colonial English ladies, notorious for their miserly ways, hear about the death of a former servant. They decide against putting a notice in the newspaper, inviting the woman's niece out to lunch instead. Cast: Eleanor Bron (Polly Knox), Sheila Burrell (Lady Eleanor Benson), Anna Neagle (Fanny Soane), Phyllis Calvert (Mabel Ince), Brian Tipping (Head Waiter), Stuart Turton (Wine Waiter), Chris Tummings (Youth), Kelvin Omard
| 81 | 12 | "Hit and Run" | Peter Hammond | Story by : Patricia Moyes; Dramatisation by : Robin Chapman | 10 May 1983 |
Roger Ashburn, a young doctor, is deeply in love with his beautiful wife, but she does not feel the same way. He arranges a dinner party with some of his friends, but she disappears afterwards. Roger is desperately worried, but a surprise is in store for him. Cast: Brenda Blethyn (Carol Hutchins), Antony Carrick (Inspector), Tony Crean (Ambulance Attendant), John Duttine (Dr Roger Ashburn), Ray Lonnen (Dr Steve Hutchins), Robert McBain (Ambulance Driver), Michael Melia (Detective Sergeant), Cherry Morris (Casualty Sister), Susan Penhaligon (Mary Ashburn), Michael Quinto (Policeman), Phyllida Nash (Joan Hunter)
| 82 | 13 | "Youth from Vienna" | Norman Lloyd | Story by : John Collier; Dramatisation by : Ross Thomas | 2 July 1983 |
Caroline Coates is promoted in her role as a television news reporter, but is worried that she will not last if her looks start to go. She is admired by a man who has come up with a formula for an anti-aging process. Cast: Sharon Gless (Caroline Coates), Dick Smothers (Dr Humphrey Baxter), James Carroll Jordan (Alan Brodie), Ellen Geer (Stella Archer), Elliott Reid (Dick Archer), Heather Locklear (Pat Ward)
| 83 | 14 | "The Turn of the Tide" | Ray Danton | Story by : C. S. Forester; Dramatisation by : Ross Thomas | 3 September 1983 |
An ex-lawyer is planning the perfect murder of an enemy of his. He plans meticulously, but he has overlooked one thing. Cast: Richard Basehart (Slade), Gretchen Corbett (Martha), Nicholas Hormann (Spalding)

=== Series 7 (1984) ===
Fifteen episodes. First broadcast: Saturdays and Sundays on ITV – 12 May to 21 October 1984

Series 7
| No. overall | No. in series | Title | Directed by | Written by | Original release date |
|---|---|---|---|---|---|
| 84 | 1 | "The Dirty Detail" | Leo Penn | Story by : Henry Slesar; Adaptation by : David Scott Milton | 12 May 1984 |
Fred Pearson, a Vietnam veteran, is a broken man after years of punishment from his sergeant. One day, he walks into a bar and sees the sergeant, still very much the arrogant bully he always was. Cast: Jenny O'Hara (Ruth Pearson), George Peppard (Sergeant Guedo), Vincent Howard (Detective), Ted Gehring (Bartender), Tom Finnegan (Barfly), Kevin Dobson (Fred Pearson)
| 85 | 2 | "The Best Chess Player in the World" | Graham Williams; Graham Evans | Story by : Julian Symons; Dramatisation by : Peter Ransley | 19 May 1984 |
Shaw, the owner of a newspaper, is controlling and very rich. His wife is content with the money he provides, but is having an affair. When Shaw finds out, he decides to act. Cast: Andrew Ray (Jerry Wilde), Christopher Reich (Peter Simpson), Clifford Parrish (Frank Miller), Michael Jayston (George Bernard Shaw), Mark Jax (White), Lynette Davies (Paula Shaw), Pat Guthrie (Telephone Operator)
| 86 | 3 | "Proxy" | Bert Salzman | Story by : Talmage Powell; Dramatisation by : Bert Salzman | 26 May 1984 |
Three men are being blackmailed by a woman for money. One day, she is found murdered and the three worry that they will be suspected. Her chauffeur, however, has a plan. Cast: Barbara Bolton (Mrs Sutton), Lois Smith (Sara), Tom Smothers (William), Patrick O'Neal (Arch Sutton), Malachy McCourt (Judge Corday), Joanne Lara (Marla Scanlon), Larry Keith (Bob Grenich)
| 87 | 4 | "Have a Nice Death" | William Slater | Story by : Antonia Fraser; Dramatisation by : Wolf Mankowitz | 2 June 1984 |
Successful writer Sam Luke is being hounded by the feminist movement for his books, which speak of women being the weaker sex. Unable to deal with them, he returns to his wife, but now he is getting death threats. Cast: Simon Cadell (Sam Luke), Kate Harper (Clodagh Jansen), Susannah Fellows (Joannie), Ian Tyler (Bellhop), Bill Bailey (Bob, Interviewer), Sue Vanner (Zara Luke), Barbara Rosenblat (Television Interviewer)
| 88 | 5 | "Number Eight" | Leo Penn | Story by : Jack Ritchie; Dramatisation by : Ross Thomas | 9 June 1984 |
A driver picks up a hitchhiker. They hear on the radio that a serial killer is on the loose, nicknamed Will-o'-the-Wisp. The driver quickly realises that the description exactly matches that of his passenger. Cast: Dennis Christopher (Driver), Brad Dourif (Hitchhiker), Kathleen Doyle (Ann), Will Hare (Old Man), Julie Burton (Marie), Miriam Byrd-Nethery (Waitress)
| 89 | 6 | "The Last of the Midnight Gardeners" | Peter Hammond | Story by : Tony Wilmot; Dramatisation by : Gerald Savory | 16 June 1984 |
A magazine editor has a wife and a secret lover. For his magazine, he launches a competition for a story involving the perfect murder. His wife encourages him to enter it himself. Cast: Jane Asher (Jane Oats), Forbes Collins (Inspector), Celia Gregory (Edna Tewsland), Patrick Mower (Walter Oats), Jim Norton (Dr Mellish), Panos Alexander (Steward)
| 90 | 7 | "The Gift of Beauty" | Bert Salzman | Story by : Joseph Dougherty; Dramatisation by : Bert Salzman | 30 June 1984 |
Elizabeth kills her husband because she wants to be with her young lover Ray – who helped in the murder – but she feels insecure because of the age gap. She then sees a flyer for an anti-aging process known as the Gift of Beauty. Cast: Carol Lynley (Elizabeth), MacKenzie Allen (Ray), Randall Edwards (Rebecca)
| 91 | 8 | "Wet Saturday" | Norman Lloyd | Story by : John Collier | 7 July 1984 |
George Princey has a high standing in the community, and when his daughter kills a man, he endeavours to cover it up to prevent him facing a scandal. Cast: Ed Begley Jr. (George Princey), Fritz Weaver (Princey), Mary Sinclair (Mrs Princey), Charles Hallahan (Jack Lowry), Sydney Swire (Millicent Princey), Rita Gomez (Rosa)
| 92 | 9 | "Sauce for the Goose" | Bert Salzman | Story by : Patricia Highsmith; Dramatisation by : Bert Salzman | 21 July 1984 |
Olivia starts a relationship with a younger man on the basis that she has killed her husband and gained his fortune. Her lover, however, still sees himself as a free agent and has an affair with another woman. Cast: Gloria Grahame (Olivia), Robert Morse (Stephen Shaw), Lisa Dunsheath (Gloria)
| 93 | 10 | "Bird of Prey" | Ray Danton | Story by : John Collier; Dramatisation by : Ross Thomas | 4 August 1984 |
Jack and Edna's parrot lays a large, oversized egg. The parrot dies, so they keep the egg warm. On hatching, it reveals an aggressive, black-feathered bird. Jack is taken by it, but Edna is suspicious of the evil-looking creature. Cast: Sondra Locke (Edna), Frank Converse (Jack), Charles Hallahan (Charlie)
| 94 | 11 | "I Like it Here in Wilmington" | John Peyser | Story by : Henry Slesar; Dramatisation by : David Scott Milton | 11 August 1984 |
Harry is a clothing manufacturer in Wilmington, Delaware. He is on the verge of bankruptcy, however. Being used to the good life, he ponders the idea of murdering his business partner to collect the insurance money. Cast: Tom Smothers (Marvin Castlemore), Susan Strasberg (Roberta Elton), Robert Loggia (Harry Elton), Wendy Austin (Cissy)
| 95 | 12 | "Accidental Death" | Peter Duffell | Story by : Denis Cannan; Dramatisation by : Tony Wilmot | 19 August 1984 |
Steve and Jane are con artists who gain access to people's homes claiming to be doing research into polish. While there, they assess the valuables in the house for later theft. Coming across a scruffy old man, they hear that he is actually rich, but they underestimate him. Cast: Andrew Ray (Steve Jeffries), Lynsey Baxter (Jane), Cyril Cusack (Percy Hampton), Tamara Ustinov (Beryl), Giles Phibbs (Farmer), Bryan Matheson (Husband in Bar), Yvonne Marsh (Policewoman), Ruth Kettlewell (Wife in Bar), John Hug (Arthur), Jacqueline Hill (Mrs Milvain), Ian Flintoff (Doctor), Jason Carter (Youth at Yacht Club)
| 96 | 13 | "The Reconciliation" | John Jacobs | Story by : Nicholas Monsarrat; Dramatisation by : Roy Russell | 16 September 1984 |
James has walked out on his wife, who still loves him. His lawyer advises him that getting a divorce may be difficult unless he can catch her being unfaithful. With not much hope, he hires a private detective. Cast: John Castle (Derek Johnstone), Keith Edwards (Juan Luis Romero), Wilfred Grove (Porter), Jim Norton (Bates), Roger Rees (James Howgill), Meg Davies (Caroline Howgill and voice of Jenny), Anna Maria Macchi (Sandra Marino)
| 97 | 14 | "The Mugger" | Peter Hammond | Idea by Miriam Bienstock; Dramatisation by Robin Chapman | 14 October 1984 |
Gerald Overton, a politician, has fallen in love with a beautiful woman he met at a party. Things go wrong and his entire career and reputation are in jeopardy. Gerald decides to take the law into his own hands. Cast: Roy Marsden (Gerald Overton), Graham Bell (Television Interviewer), Amanda Boxer (Jenny Overton), Kate Harper (Mary Tregallas), Peter Russell (Policeman), Toby Scopes (James Overton), Zara Nutley (Ann Dibbell), Mark Lewis (Gerald's Pursuer), David Hanson (John Dibbell), Diana Goodman (Television Reporter), Evie Garratt (Mrs Cromer), Forbes Collins (Police Officer), Raymond Boyd (Manservant), Dadina Sagah (Maid), Chris Tummings (Boy on roller skates)
| 98 | 15 | "The Open Window" | Christopher Lukas | Story by : Hector Hugh Munro; Dramatisation by : David Trainer | 21 October 1984 |
At a hunting lodge in Connecticut, a young man named Gregory meets Jane, the daughter of Marjorie, who owns the lodge. Jane tells Gregory that this is the third anniversary of her stepfather and his son having been killed in a hunting accident. But every year, Marjorie leaves the window open in the deluded belief that they will still come back. Cast: Michael Conforti (Stanley), Valerie Mahaffey (Jane), Richard Dow (Gregory), Richard Marr (Vernon), Michael Galloway (Stuart), Dina Merrill (Marjorie)

=== Series 8 (1985) ===
Four episodes. First broadcast: 1 Saturday and 3 Sundays on ITV – 30 March and 14 to 28 July 1985

Series 8
| No. overall | No. in series | Title | Directed by | Written by | Original release date |
|---|---|---|---|---|---|
| 99 | 1 | "People Don't Do Such Things" | Gordon Hessler | Story by : Ruth Rendell; Dramatisation by : Ross Thomas | 30 March 1985 |
Reeve Baker is a successful romantic novelist. Gwen, the wife of a friend, falls for Baker and, despite her husband's warnings, continues the relationship. Cast: Jay Varela (Sergeant Demmer), Don Johnson (Reeve Baker), Arthur Hill (Terence Carter), Samantha Eggar (Gwen Carter), Denise Galik (Melanie Todd)
| 100 | 2 | "In the Cards" | John Peyser | Story by : John Collier; Dramatisation by : Ross Thomas & A. A. Roberts | 14 July 1985 |
Madame Myra is a fortuneteller with a lacklustre career and a dim future. A man eventually shows up, eager to guide her toward a better life, but he has an ulterior motive. Cast: Kenneth Tigar (Merrifield), Elaine Giftos (Grace), Susan Strasberg (Madame Myra), Max Gail (Charlie)
| 101 | 3 | "Nothin' Short of Highway Robbery" | John Peyser | Story by : Lawrence Block; Dramatisation by : Luther Murdoch | 21 July 1985 |
A husband and wife are embarking on a long drive through the desert. They stop at a rundown gas station, only to be told their car needs extensive repairs. They then agree to stay for a meal while the mechanic works on it. (Episode recorded in 1981) Cast: Jennifer Holmes (Marcie), Bud Cort (Newt), Bettye Ackerman (Ruby), Warren Oates (Harry) NOTE: This aired after Oates's death in 1982.
| 102 | 4 | "Scrimshaw" | Dezsö Magyar | Story by : Brian Garfield; Dramatisation by : Bernard N. Eismann | 28 July 1985 |
Brenda is a lonely alcoholic living in Florida. Her life is turned around when an old friend, Eric, turns up. Cast: Claude Anagram (The Bartender), Sam Weyman (The Man on the Beach), Mary Gross (The Woman on the Beach), Adair Jameson (The Gallery Lady), Charles Kimbrough (Eric), Buddy Owen (The Sailor), Joan Hackett (Brenda Lawson), Harry Richard (The Desk Clerk) NOTE: This aired after Hackett's death in 1983.

=== Series 9 (1987–1988) ===
Ten episodes. First broadcast: Fridays on ITV – 18 December 1987 to 29 January 1988 and 15 April to 13 May 1988

Series 9
| No. overall | No. in series | Title | Directed by | Written by | Original release date |
|---|---|---|---|---|---|
| 103 | 1 | "Skeleton in the Cupboard" | Paul Annett | Tony Wilmott | 18 December 1987 |
Robert has kept secret that he accidentally killed a ten-year-old girl in a car crash twenty years ago. A young woman, Jane, comes to the area trying to find a man whose name she does not know, but whom she knows arrived driving an MG. Cast: Francesca Brill (Jane Fisher), Charles Dance (Robert Smythe), Philip Dunbar (Henry Traile), Zoë Wanamaker (Margaret Smythe), Matthew Jones (Man on the Phone)
| 104 | 2 | "The Colonel's Lady" | Barry Davis | Story by : Somerset Maugham; Dramatisation by : Denis Cannan | 8 January 1988 |
Eve Hamilton-Peregrine has written a successful book of poetry. Her husband is suspicious about the subject of the poems and demands to know who the lover is about whom she writes. Cast: Joss Ackland (Colonel George Peregrine), Paul Williamson (Harry), Gareth Thomas (Telfer), Anna Nicholas (Irina Stefanopoulos), Dennis Matsuki (Manservant), Carol Leader (Daphne), John Horsley (Giles Rowley), Rupert Frazer (Basil Dashwood), Kate Emma Davies (Clio Stefanopoulos), Allan Corduner (Hatchards Bookshop Assistant), Pauline Collins (Eve Peregrine)
| 105 | 3 | "The Surgeon" | Graham Evans | Story by : Roald Dahl | 15 January 1988 |
When wealthy Prince Zawi gives surgeon Robert Sandy a diamond for saving his life, the doctor finds that his new jewel is really more of a liability than an asset. Cast: John Alderton (Robert Sandy), David Belcher (Julius Goff), Shirley Cain (Sister Wyman), Jonathan Coy (William Haddock), Alison Fiske (Betty Sandy), Geoffrey Greenhill (Detective Inspector Watkins), Raad Rawi (Crown Prince Zawi), Devon Scott (Jane Chenies), John Skitt (James Wishart), Thorley Walters (Harry Gold)
| 106 | 4 | "The Verger" | Rodney Bennett | Story by : Somerset Maugham; Dramatisation by : Denis Cannan | 22 January 1988 |
When devoted verger Albert is forced to resign, he sets out to build a new life. But can he succeed in a modern world that has little time for his old-fashioned ways? Cast: Gareth Walker (Cafe Owner), Tony Kassell (The Boy), Debbie Norris (First Waitress), Glenda Smith (Second Waitress), Andrew Seear (Clerk), Geoffrey Beevers (The Health Inspector), Bruce Boa (Groober), Richard Briers (Albert Dobson), Andrew Burt (Vicar), Mike Carnell (Passer-by), Geoffrey Chater (Magistrate), Rowland Davies (Bank Manager), Bradley Lavelle (Lawyer), Patricia Routledge (Milly Dobson)
| 107 | 5 | "The Facts of Life" | John Gorrie | Story by : Somerset Maugham; Dramatisation by : Noella Smith | 29 January 1988 |
When sheltered young son Nicholas travels to London to complete in a fencing competition, he gets caught up in a very strange adventure. Cast: Jim Broadbent (Lovejoy), Benedict Taylor (Nicholas Lillie), James Easton (Tony), Stephen Hancock (Mr Lillie), Daphne Neville (Mrs Lillie), Gerard Logan (James Barron-Ervine), John Drake (The President), Ronald Markham (Arthur), Rosalind Bennett (Zoe), Ronnie Stevens (Rudge), Genevieve Allenbury (Croupier), James Trapp (Cashier), Paul Vaughan-Teague (Scorer)
| 108 | 6 | "Wink Three Times" | Paul Annett | Story by : John Charters; Dramatisation by : Paul Ableman | 15 April 1988 |
When a timid provincial solicitor visits a smart London hotel on a business trip, he becomes embroiled in a curious case of mistaken identity. Cast: Peter Baldwin (Second Desk Clerk), Andrew Bicknell (Giles Wimbourne), Ellis Dale (First Desk Clerk), Peter Davison (Jeremy Tyler), Jeremy Gittins (Dominic), Liza Goddard (Babs Colport), Luke Kelly (Barman), Robin Lermitte (Piers), Caroline Goodall (Holly Peverill), Terry Wallis (Hall Porter), Les Henry (Head Waiter), Mel Hastings (Steward)
| 109 | 7 | "The Dead Don't Steal" | John Glenister | Story by : Ella Griffiths; Dramatisation by : Robin Chapman | 22 April 1988 |
Ken Johnson is having an affair with his secretary, Lillian. His wife finds out about it and is furious, but then, Lillian tells Ken that she has met someone else. In temper, he kills her and buries her body, but then he receives a phone call from her. Cast: Nicholas Ball (Ken Johnson), Glynis Barber (Lilian and Sylvia Brett), David Caddick (First Police Officer), Norman Tyrrell (George), Albert Welling (Inspector Gunter), Michael Wisher (Dexter), Lois Baxter (Annie Johnson), Derek Carpenter (Van Driver), Dave Sommerton (Second Police Officer), Brian Goodfellow (Detective Sergeant Davies)
| 110 | 8 | "The Finger of Suspicion" | Rodney Bennett | Story by : Tony Wilmot; Dramatisation by : Robin Chapman | 29 April 1988 |
Happily married and living in the Middle East, American safe-cracker Steve is suddenly threatened with extradition for a crime he says he did not commit. Cast: Michael Brandon (Stephen Baker), Lucy Gutteridge (Soroya), Stefan Kalipha (Chief Inspector Aziz), Michael O'Hagan (Superintendent Burke), Nadim Sawalha (Zayid Halim), Rob Spendlove (Inspector Hook), Tony Allief (Police Sergeant), Eddie Lemare (Police Constable)
| 111 | 9 | "A Time to Die" | Paul Annett | Story by : Aileen Wheeler; Dramatisation by : Robin Chapman | 6 May 1988 |
Yves’s marriage has gone stale and his young mistress has announced that she is pregnant but he then makes a decision which changes everyone’s lives forever. Cast: Mike McKenzie (Pianist), David Suchet (Yves Drouard), Nina Van Pallandt (Marthe Drouard), Sarah-Jane Varley (Lucie), Adam Crouch (Antoine), Paul Herzberg (Henri), Pauline Letts (Madame Cabon), Jemma Redgrave (Violette Charbonneau), Ivor Roberts (Gas Inspector)
| 112 | 10 | "Mr Know-All" | Gareth Davies | Story by : Somerset Maugham; Dramatisation by : Paul Ableman | 13 May 1988 |
When pretty hotel worker Elly is charmed by a guest, archaeologist Max Kelada, it seems that the Mr-Know-It-All professor might not be the man he claims to be. Cast: Edward Wiley (Jasper Cranley), Eamonn Walker (Bates), Topol (Professor Max Kelada), Kim Thomson (Elly Somerton), Steve Plytas (Professor Daxatides), Steffanie Pitt (Angela Dalton), Leslie Lyon (Lizzie Cranley), Erika Hoffman (Suzie Anderson), Peter Frye (Professor Maddox)

These episodes have frequently been repeated on British television, most recently on Sky Arts. All episodes have been released on DVD in a box set for each series, except the 1984–85 series, which was released together with the first episode of the eighth series.
