= The Best of Roald Dahl =

Collection of stories by Roald Dahl

- First edition cover
- Author: Roald Dahl
- Publisher: Penguin Random House
- Publication date: 1978
- ISBN: 978-0-140-06694-4

The Best of Roald Dahl is a collection of 25 of Roald Dahl's short stories. The first edition was published in 1978. In one of its previous publications, it included, the story "The Wonderful Story of Henry Sugar" which was made into an Academy Award-winning short film by Wes Anderson and was streamed on Netflix as well.

== Contents ==
- Madame Rosette
- Man from the South
- The Sound Machine
- Taste
- Dip in the Pool
- Skin
- Edward the Conqueror
- Lamb to the Slaughter
- Galloping Foxley
- The Way Up to Heaven
- Parson's Pleasure
- The Landlady
- William and Mary
- Mrs. Bixby and the Colonel's Coat
- Royal Jelly
- Georgy Porgy
- Genesis and Catastrophe
- Pig
- The Visitor
- Claud's Dog
  - The Ratcatcher
  - Rummins
  - Mr Hoddy
  - Mr Feasey
  - The Champion of the World

== Reception ==
Many book reviewing websites have mentioned positive reviews on the book.

Dahl has the mastery of plot and characters possessed by great writers of the past, along with a wildness and wryness of his own. One of his trademarks is writing beautifully about the ugly, even the horrible.

- Los Angeles Times

An ingenious imagination, a fascination with odd and ordinary detail, and a lust for its thorough exploitation are the…strengths of Dahl’s storytelling.

- New York Times Book Review
