= Tales of the Unexpected (short story collection) =

Short story collection by Roald Dahl

- First edition
- Author: Roald Dahl
- Language: English
- Genre: Crime • horror • conte cruel
- Publisher: Michael Joseph
- Publication date: September 1979
- Media type: print
- Pages: 256
- ISBN: 0-7181-1751-4
- OCLC: 903938072
- Followed by: More Tales of the Unexpected

Roald Dahl's Tales of the Unexpected is a collection of 16 short stories written by British author Roald Dahl and first published in 1979. All of the stories were earlier published in the books Someone Like You and Kiss Kiss.

This collection, along with More Tales of the Unexpected, was issued as a companion to Anglia's popular television series Tales of the Unexpected, broadcast on ITV from 1979 to 1988.

== Stories ==
1. "Taste"
2. "Lamb to the Slaughter"
3. "Man from the South"
4. "My Lady Love, My Dove"
5. "Dip in the Pool"
6. "Galloping Foxley"
7. "Skin"
8. "Neck"
9. "Nunc Dimittis"
10. "The Landlady"
11. "William and Mary"
12. "The Way Up to Heaven"
13. "Parson's Pleasure"
14. "Mrs. Bixby and the Colonel's Coat"
15. "Royal Jelly"
16. "Edward the Conqueror"
