= The Great Automatic Grammatizator =

1998 collection of short stories by Roald Dahl

- First edition cover
- Author: Roald Dahl

The Great Automatic Grammatizator (published in the U.S. as The Umbrella Man and Other Stories) is a posthumous 1998 collection of thirteen short stories written by British author Roald Dahl. The stories were selected for teenagers from Dahl's adult works. All the stories included were published elsewhere originally; their sources are noted below. The stories, with the exception of the war story "Katina", possess a deadpan, ironic, bizarre, or even macabre sense of humor. They generally end with unexpected plot twists.

== Stories ==
- "The Great Automatic Grammatizator" (from Someone Like You): A mechanically-minded man reasons that the rules of grammar are fixed by certain, almost mathematical principles. By exploiting this idea, he is able to create a mammoth machine that can write a prize-winning novel in roughly fifteen minutes. The story ends on a fearful note, as more and more of the world's writers are forced into licensing their names—and all hope of human creativity—to the machine.

With the recent advent of LLMs, after seven decades since its conception, this story has once again attracted interest.

- "Mrs. Bixby and the Colonel's Coat" (from Kiss Kiss): Mrs. Bixby cheats on her dentist husband with a rich, dashing colonel. When their relationship breaks off, the colonel offers Mrs. Bixby a gorgeous and expensive mink coat. In an attempt to explain the coat away, Mrs. Bixby sets up an elaborate trick with the help of a pawn shop—but her husband learns of the ruse and manages to turn the tables.
- "The Butler" (from More Tales of the Unexpected): An obnoxious and newly wealthy couple employs a butler and chef to impress dinner guests. The butler recommends that the husband buy expensive wines to please his guests, and the man slavishly follows the idea. The butler and the chef reap the rewards of this idea, while making fools of the "fashionable" couple.
- "Man from the South" (from Someone Like You): At a seaside resort in Jamaica, a strange old man makes a bet with an American man in his late teens. If the young man's cigarette lighter can spark ten times without fail, the American will win a brand-new Cadillac car—but failure means losing the little finger of his right hand. The high-tension wager ensues, and with only a few sparks left, a woman—who knows only too well the cost of the old man's bets—appears and stops the madness.
- "The Landlady" (from Kiss Kiss): A young man traveling to London on business stops at a bed and breakfast along the way, where a strange and slightly dotty landlady eagerly welcomes him. The eccentric nature of the house, and the news that only two other young men have ever stayed there, confuse and frighten the young man. In the end, the landlady—who indulges in the hobby of taxidermy—and the boy share a drink of tea that tastes of bitter almonds, and the landlady softly smiles at what may be her latest stuffing project.
- "Parson's Pleasure" (from Kiss Kiss): A man discovers an extremely rare piece of Chippendale furniture at the farm of some boorish ranchers. He desperately attempts to buy the piece cheap, in the hope of selling it at auction to earn a huge profit. He manages to buy the piece "for firewood", only for the ranchers to destroy it in an attempt to make it fit into his car.
- "The Umbrella Man" (from More Tales of the Unexpected): On a rainy day, a mother and daughter meet a gentlemanly old man on a street corner, who offers them a beautiful silk umbrella in exchange for a pound note. They trade, and the daughter notices that the "feeble" old man suddenly seems much sprier. They follow him, and discover that the gentleman is a con artist who visits various pubs, has a drink, and then steals another umbrella to continue the cycle.
- "Katina" (from Over to You: Ten Stories of Flyers and Flying): A group of RAF pilots stationed in Greece during World War II discover a hauntingly beautiful young girl, whose "family is beneath the rubble." She becomes their squadron's unofficial "mascot". In the end, her fragile life is taken as she stands defiantly against a rain of bullets from Nazi aircraft, shaking her fists at the heavens.
- "The Way Up to Heaven" (from Kiss Kiss): Mrs. Foster suffers from a chronic phobia of being late for appointments. Her husband enjoys the cruel sport of purposely delaying their activities, just to rile his wife. On the day when Mrs. Foster is due to fly to Paris to visit her grandchildren, her husband engages in his usual tricks. But as Mrs. Foster rushes from their taxi to the house to find him, she hears a strange noise—and turns triumphantly toward her cab. It is only when she returns, and calls a man to "repair the lift" that was stuck between floors in the house, that readers guess Mr. Foster's fate.
- "Royal Jelly" (from Kiss Kiss): New parents fear for the life of their little girl, who is sickly and dangerously underweight. The husband, a beekeeper, remembers hearing of the miraculous royal jelly used by bees to transform one particular larva into a queen. He adds the mixture to his daughter's bottles, and she puts on weight at an astonishing rate. The mother senses that something is amiss, and the husband confesses his actions—along with the fact that he himself swallowed buckets of the jelly for months in an attempt to cure his impotence. The royal jelly did the trick—but the strange side-effects include a disturbing metamorphosis for both father and daughter.
- "Vengeance is Mine Inc." (from More Tales of the Unexpected): Two brothers who are short of cash bemoan their fate over breakfast while reading the society column of a newspaper. They hit upon a scheme to take revenge on cruel tabloid writers in exchange for money from wealthy patrons. The unconventional plan works, and the brothers line their pockets with the spoils of their plans.
- "Taste" (from Someone Like You): A rich man with a beautiful young daughter hosts a dinner party, inviting a famous connoisseur of fine wines. When the rich man boasts that he has a wine that the expert cannot identify, the stakes become frighteningly high: if he can guess the name and vintage of the wine, he will win his daughter's hand. After an elaborate show, the expert guesses correctly; however, the family's maid appears and inadvertently exposes the guest as a cheat, thus saving the girl.
- "Neck" (from Someone Like You): A newspaper heir finds himself suddenly engaged to the voluptuous and controlling Lady Tutton. He loses all control of his life, and only his trusted butler and friends realize how broken he is by her control. A weekend trip to their estate, however, proves the perfect opportunity for Lord Tutton to engage in revenge against his wicked wife: her head is trapped in a valuable piece of wooden sculpture, and he must decide whether to use a saw or an axe to cut her free.

== Publication details ==
- Dahl, Roald (19 January 2004). The Umbrella Man and Other Stories. Speak. ISBN 9780142400876.

== Reception ==
Groff Conklin in 1954 called the short story "The Great Automatic Grammatizator" "an awe-inspiring fantasy-satire ... an unforgettable bit of biting nonsense".
