= Skin and Other Stories =

2000 short story collection by Roald Dahl

- First edition cover
- Author: Roald Dahl
- Publisher: Puffin Books
- Publication date: July 2000
- ISBN: 0-670-89184-3

Skin and Other Stories is a collection of short stories written by Roald Dahl, published in 2000 by Puffin Books, a division of Penguin Putnam Books.

Most of these stories were previously collected in the Dahl book, Someone Like You (1953). "An African Story" and "Beware of the Dog" were previously collected in Over to You (1946). "The Champion of the World" was previously collected in Kiss Kiss (1960).

The story "The Surgeon" was originally published in Playboy magazine in 1986.

== Contents ==
- "Skin"
- "Lamb to the Slaughter"
- "The Sound Machine"
- "An African Story"
- "Galloping Foxley"
- "The Wish"
- "The Surgeon"
- "Dip in the Pool"
- "The Champion of the World"
- "Beware of the Dog"
- "My Lady Love, My Dove"

== Plot summaries ==
=== The Surgeon ===
Dr Sandy operates on a Saudi prince, and is given a diamond as a reward. He is going away for the weekend, so he hides the diamond by freezing it into an ice tray. When he returns, his house has been ransacked and the diamond is gone. The next day, another surgeon is operating on someone with an object stuck in his intestine. It is the diamond! This surgeon takes it to the same jeweller Dr Sandy had taken it to, to be valued. The jeweller recognises it and calls the police, who arrest the other surgeon. The jeweller notifies Sandy. He is able to explain the situation, and the burglar is arrested while recovering from his surgery. He had evidently made himself a drink at Dr Sandy's house.
