= Tales of the Unexpected =

Tales of the Unexpected may refer to:

- Tales of the Unexpected (comics), a 1950s–1960s comic book
- Tales of the Unexpected (book), a collection of short stories by Roald Dahl
- Tales of the Unexpected (TV series), a British series inspired by Dahl's stories
- Quinn Martin's Tales of the Unexpected, a 1977 American television show known in the United Kingdom as Twist in the Tale

== See also ==
- More Tales of the Unexpected, a short story collection by Roald Dahl
