= More Tales of the Unexpected =

1980 short story collection by Roald Dahl

- First edition
- Author: Roald Dahl
- Language: English
- Genre: Short story anthology, science fiction, mystery, dark comedy
- Published: Michael Joseph
- Publication place: United Kingdom
- Media type: Print (paperback)
- Pages: 127
- ISBN: 0-7181-1919-3
- OCLC: 217978743
- Preceded by: Tales of the Unexpected

More Tales of the Unexpected is a collection of nine short stories by Roald Dahl. It was published in 1980 by Michael Joseph and Penguin. Five of the stories were published in prior collections, while the other four had not been previously collected in book form.

This collection, along Tales of the Unexpected, was issued as a companion to Anglia's popular television series Tales of the Unexpected, broadcast on ITV from 1979 to 1988.

== Stories ==
The collection contains the following stories:

- "Genesis and Catastrophe" (previously collected in Kiss Kiss)
- "Georgy Porgy" (previously collected in Kiss Kiss)
- "Mr. Botibol"
- "Poison" (previously collected in Someone Like You)
- "The Butler" (subsequently collected in The Great Automatic Grammatizator)
- "The Hitch-Hiker" (previously collected in The Wonderful Story of Henry Sugar and Six More)
- "The Sound Machine" (previously collected in Someone Like You)
- "The Umbrella Man" (subsequently collected in The Great Automatic Grammatizator)
- "Vengeance is Mine Inc."
