= Danny, the Champion of the World =

1975 children's novel by Roald Dahl

Danny the Champion of the World
- Original book cover
- Author: Roald Dahl
- Original title: Danny the champion of the world
- Illustrator: Jill Bennett (original); Quentin Blake
- Language: English
- Genre: Children's
- Published: 14 February 1975 Jonathan Cape (original); Puffin Books (current)
- Publication place: United Kingdom
- Media type: Print (hardback, paperback)
- Pages: 224
- ISBN: 0-14-032873-4

Danny, the Champion of the World is a 1975 children's novel by British author Roald Dahl. The plot centres on Danny, a young English boy, and his father, William. They live in a Gypsy caravan, fix cars for a living in their mechanic shop, and partake in poaching pheasants. It was first published in the United States by Alfred A. Knopf, Inc., on 14 February 1975, and in the United Kingdom by Jonathan Cape.

It was adapted into a made-for-TV movie in 1989 by Thames Television which starred Jeremy Irons as William and Robbie Coltrane as Mr Victor Hazell. The novel is based on Dahl's adult short story "The Champion of the World" which first appeared in print in The New Yorker magazine, as did some of the other short stories that would later be reprinted as Kiss Kiss (1960).

There have been two unabridged recordings of the book released. The first was in 2007 by actor Timothy West for Puffin Audiobooks. The second was by actor Peter Serafinowicz for Penguin Audio. Time magazine included the novel in its list of the 100 Best Young-Adult Books of All Time. In 2023, the novel was ranked by the BBC at no. 92 in its poll of "The 100 greatest children's books of all time".

== Summary ==
Danny, who was born in the South of England, is only four months old when his mother dies suddenly. He is an only child, and lives with his father, William, in an old caravan behind the service station and garage they operate together. Danny and his father are very close, and share pastimes like building kites, fire balloons, and go-karts. William is also an excellent teller of bedtime stories, and among other things invents a version of The BFG to tell to Danny. The father and son have generally idyllic times despite not owning much.

The owner of all the land surrounding Danny's home is Mr. Victor Hazell, an unpleasant but influential local nouveau riche beer magnate. He had once been to the service station, and threatened Danny with a hiding if there were any fingerprints found on his silver Rolls-Royce after the fuel-up. William ordered Hazell to leave, and Hazell has frequently sent government officials to bother William about trivialities ever since.

When Danny is nine years old, William sneaks out of the caravan one night. Awakening and discovering William gone, Danny waits for him to return and learns that William had been in the nearby woods, which belong to Mr. Hazell, hoping to poach a pheasant. William's late father Horace had been an avid pheasant poacher, and taught William to love the 'sport'; also, William thoroughly dislikes Hazell and gains pleasure from poaching his birds.

Some days later, William returns to Hazell’s wood for another poaching venture. Danny wakes in the night to find that William has not returned home, despite having promised to be back almost four hours earlier. Sensing that William has suffered an accident, Danny sets out to rescue him, driving a vintage "Baby" Austin 7 he and William had been repairing. On the journey, Danny crosses paths with a police car, but manages to escape through a gap in a roadside hedge. He sneaks through the woods and finds his father incapacitated by a broken ankle, having fallen into in a pit trap Hazell dug for poachers. Danny rescues William and drives him back home.

While William recovers from his injury, he and Danny realise Hazell's annual pheasant shoot is approaching – an event to which he invites aristocrats and county officials from across the district. Danny and William decide to humiliate Hazell by poaching all the pheasants in the forest just before the event. As the local doctor, Doc Spencer, has prescribed sleeping pills for William (which the latter refuses to take), Danny comes up with the idea to soak some raisins until they swell, then sew the contents of the pills into the bait: William names this method "Sleeping Beauty". After having successfully drugged and captured 120 pheasants from Hazell's Wood, Danny and William take a taxi driven by fellow poacher Charlie Kinch to the local vicarage, where they hide the pheasants. Afterwards, they walk home.

The next day, the vicar's wife Mrs. Clipstone delivers the sleeping pheasants to William's garage in a specially built baby carriage; however, the pheasants start drunkenly flying and flopping out of the carriage as the soporific wears off. During the commotion, Mr. Hazell arrives in a sputtering rage, and confronts Danny, William and Doc Spencer, demanding they give his birds back. With the help of Police Sergeant Enoch Samways, Danny and William proceed to shoo the stunned pheasants back towards Hazell's land, knowing full well that Mr. Hazell's Rolls-Royce is in the way with one of its doors left open. The drugged birds create a horrible mess with their droppings, and damage the car's paintwork and upholstery with their claws. As Mr. Hazell drives off in humiliation, many of the pheasants wake up completely and fly away in the opposite direction from Hazell's property, thus ruining his shooting party. Danny is hailed as "the champion of the world" by his father, Doc Spencer and Sgt. Samways.

Doc Spencer finds six pheasants dead from having taken an overdose, so he distributes two each to Sergeant Samways, Mrs. Clipstone, and William. Danny and William then walk into town, intending to buy a new oven from Mr. Wheeler to roast their pheasants. They also discuss possibly attempting to poach trout from a local stream.

The book ends with a plea to the child who has just finished reading the story, that when they are grown up with children of their own, they be as "sparky" a parent to them as William was to Danny.

== Adaptations ==
=== TV movie ===
The book was adapted into a made-for-TV movie in 1989 by Thames Television. It was directed by Gavin Millar and starred Jeremy Irons as William Smith, and his son, Samuel Irons, as the titular character, Danny Smith, with Robbie Coltrane as Mr. Hazell. It was released to Region 2 DVD in 2006.

=== Stage adaptation ===
The book was adapted for the stage by actor and writer David Wood in 2004, commissioned by the Sherman Theatre, Cardiff.

== Relations to other Roald Dahl books ==
Danny, the Champion of the World is based on a previous short story by Dahl, entitled "The Champion of the World", which was first published in The New Yorker in 1959 and later re-published in the compilation Kiss Kiss. The original story has a similar premise, but with two adults named Claud and Gordon as the main characters.

William tells Danny a bedtime story sequence of a "Big Friendly Giant" who captures good dreams and blows them into children's bedrooms at night. Dahl would later use the same concept in the full-length novel The BFG.

Danny describes being caned by his teacher, Captain Lancaster, for cheating in an exam. This is similar to an experience that Dahl recounted of his own teacher, Captain Hardcastle, in Boy: Tales of Childhood.

== Editions ==
- ISBN 0-435-12221-5 (hardback, 1975)
- ISBN 0-14-032287-6 (paperback, 1977)
- ISBN 0-14-032873-4 (paperback, 1988)
- ISBN 0-224-03749-8 (hardback, 1994)
- ISBN 0-14-037157-5 (paperback, 1994)
- ISBN 0-224-06469-X (paperback, 2002)
- ISBN 0-375-81425-6 (hardback, 2002)
- ISBN 0-375-91425-0 (library binding, 2002)
- ISBN 0-14-131132-0 (hardback, 2004)
