= Mr. Botibol =

1980 short story by Roald Dahl

- Short story by Roald Dahl

Publication
- Published in: More Tales of the Unexpected
- Publisher: Penguin Books
- Publication date: 1980

"Mr. Botibol" is a short story by Roald Dahl. Written in 1948, the story was not published until 1980, when it was included in Dahl's short story collection More Tales of the Unexpected.

== Synopsis ==
Mr. Angel Botibol is a timid, middle-aged bachelor who feels he has achieved nothing in life. After selling his family business for £100,000 (equivalent to £3,144,000 in 2025, assuming the story is set in 1948) and drinking heavily, Mr. Botibol pretends to conduct a radio performance of a work by Beethoven. Enjoying the experience, he constructs a miniature concert hall in his house where he conducts imaginary recitals to gramophone records. He also purchases a Bechstein grand piano with keys that do not emit musical notes when struck, fantasising that he is a great musician-composer as he "plays" the instrument. While purchasing the piano, he meets Miss Lucille Darlington, a fellow music-lover, who eventually accepts his invitation to play the role of pianist in a performance of Beethoven's Emperor Concerto. After the "concert", Lucille reveals that she is a piano teacher. The story ends with Lucille accepting Mr. Botibol's invitation to "perform" together again, saying "I've always wanted to be Horowitz. And could I, do you think, could I please be Schnabel tomorrow?"

== Adaptations ==
Although the main character bears the same unusual surname as the ill-fated protagonist of an earlier Dahl story, Dip in the Pool, the two stories are otherwise unrelated. Nevertheless, when these two stories were adapted for television's Tales of the Unexpected, the same actor, Jack Weston, played "Botibol" in both episodes.

An independent short film loosely based on the story was released by Paisley Films in 2013.
