= Chaim Bermant =

British writer (1929–1998)

- Born: 26 February 1929; Braslaw, then in Poland, now in Belarus
- Died: 20 January 1998 (aged 68); Hampstead Garden Suburb, London, England
- Education: University of Glasgow (MA Hons., MLitt); London School of Economics (MScEcon)

Chaim Icyk Bermant (26 February 1929 – 20 January 1998) was a British-based journalist and author. He contributed regularly to The Jewish Chronicle and occasionally to the national press, particularly The Observer. An Orthodox Jew and supporter of Israel, he was freely critical of both. He wrote several novels and non-fiction works, mostly on the quirks of British Jewish society.

== Biography ==
=== Early life ===
Chaim Icyk Bermant was born on 26 February 1929 in Braslaw, then in Poland but now in Belarus. He grew up in Barovke, Latvia, until moving to Scotland at the age of eight. He was educated at Queen's Park Secondary School in Glasgow, spending much of the Second World War as an evacuee at a farm near Annan, Dumfriesshire. After leaving school he sought to become a rabbi like his father, attending the Glasgow Rabbinical College (yeshiva), but then decided to work on the land as a pastech (shepherd). However, a short and disappointing spell on an Israeli kibbutz put paid to this idea, and so he returned to read politics and economics at Glasgow University and economics at the London School of Economics, where he wrote a master's thesis on Independent Members of the British Parliament under the supervision of Reginald Bassett.

=== Writing career ===
Aside from teaching at a "crammer" school in Tunbridge Wells and at a secondary modern in Ingatestone, Essex, Bermant wrote for economics journals and other periodicals throughout the late 1950s before eventually turning his hand to scriptwriting, first at Scottish Television for John Grierson and later at Granada in Manchester, where he and his fellow Glaswegian Jeremy Isaacs were involved in launching World in Action. However, it was in his capacity as a columnist and feature writer for The Jewish Chronicle, beginning in 1961 and lasting almost without interruption until his death, that he acquired his reputation as an acerbic but sympathetic observer of the habits and mores of Jewish life in Britain. An occasional contributor to other national newspapers, most notably The Observer and The Daily Telegraph (where he penned obituaries of notable Jewish figures), he also wrote a number of novels and non-fiction works, including a biography of Britain's then Chief Rabbi, Immanuel Jakobovits. His own autobiography, a warm and evocative recollection of his experiences in Glasgow and Israel, was published in 1976.

=== Viewpoints ===
Although a habitual worshipper at synagogue and supporter of Israel, Bermant nevertheless balanced his Orthodox religious sentiments with a liberal disposition towards social and political issues that sometimes placed him at odds with elements of British and international Jewry. For instance, while living in Israel in the early 1970s he questioned its right to occupy Sinai and the West Bank, believing that these territories ought to be bargained as part of a future peace agreement. He also criticised ultra-Orthodox religious parties in Israel for their reactionary tendencies and figures such as the Lubavitcher Rebbe for encouraging messianism. Probably his most contentious claim, however, was that the Holocaust had become excessively memorialised, leading (in his words) to a "perverse view of Jewish experience".

As a young man Bermant had sympathy for many of the arguments in favour of Scottish Home Rule, to the extent that he considered joining the Scottish National Party whilst an undergraduate; however, he also admired England and believed that Scotland had benefitted economically from the Act of Union. By the 1970s, when the campaign for "Scotland's oil" was in full cry, he accused Scottish nationalists of "acting like brash nephews, who have lived off a rich and indulgent uncle for many years". He was also, at that time, an opponent of Britain's membership of the European Economic Community, on the grounds that he did not wish to see British national identity consumed by a larger polity.

=== Personal life ===
Bermant married Judith Rose Weil on 16 December 1962 at Adath Israel Synagogue in Stoke Newington, London. They had four children: Aliza, Evie, Azriel and Daniel Bermant.

Bermant died on 20 January 1998 in Hampstead Garden Suburb, London from a myocardial infarction.

== Works ==
=== Fiction ===
- Jericho Sleep Alone (1964)
- Ben Preserve Us (1965)
- Berl Make Tea (1965)
- Diary Of An Old Man (1966)
- Swinging In The Rain (1967)
- Here Endeth The Lesson (1969)
- Now Dowager (1971)
- Roses are Blooming in Picardy (1972)
- The Last Supper (1973)
- The Walled Garden (1975)
- The Second Mrs Whitberg (1976)
- The Squire Of Bor Shachor (1977)
- Now Newman Was Old (1978)
- Belshazzar (1979)
- The Patriarch (1981)
- House Of Women (1983)
- Dancing Bear (1984)
- The Companion (1987)
- Titch (1987)

=== Non-fiction ===
- Israel (1967) "New Nations and Peoples Library" series
- Troubled Eden: An Anatomy of British Jewry (1969)
- The Cousinhood: The Anglo-Jewish Gentry (1971)
- Point of Arrival: A Study of London's East End (1975)
- The Jews (1977)
- Contributed a chapter to Joan Abse (ed.), My LSE (1977)
- Ebla: An Archaeological Enigma (1979) co-authored with Michael Weitzman
- On The Other Hand (1982)
- What's the Joke: A Study of Jewish Humour through the Ages (1986)
- Lord Jakobovits: An Authorized Biography of the Chief Rabbi (1990)
- Murmurings of A Licensed Heretic (1990)

=== Autobiography ===
- Coming Home (1976)
- Genesis: A Latvian Childhood (1998)
