= Pig (short story) =

Macabre short story by Roald Dahl

- Short story by Roald Dahl
- Country: United Kingdom
- Language: English

Publication
- Published in: Kiss Kiss
- Publication type: Short-story collection
- Publisher: Michael Joseph
- Publication date: 1960

"Pig" is a macabre short story by Roald Dahl that was published in Dahl's 1960 collection Kiss Kiss. The world it presents is one that is cruel and violent. It is a cautionary tale warning parents of the danger of ill-preparing a child for the dangers and realities of the greater world, particularly the shielding of children from things perceived as bad by the parents, but accepted by the world at large.

== Plot ==
A couple in New York City has a baby boy whom they name Lexington. Twelve days after his birth, instead of staying home to care for the child, they hire a nanny to do so and go out on the town for lobsters and champagne, spending their time out discussing and admiring their son in his absence. When they return home the husband is without his key, so he attempts to get into the house by breaking through the front window. As he is lifting his wife through the window, he stops there and starts kissing her. By the time the two are finished and he is pushing her through the window, a police car has pulled up and three cops run toward the couple, guns drawn, telling them to hold up their hands. In their position, they are not able to "Stick 'em up!", so, as Dahl writes, "The cops, all of whom had received medals before for killing robbers, opened fire immediately," killing both. Lexington is now an orphan.

The policemen receive citations, and "the news of this killing" is "eagerly conveyed to all relatives of the deceased couple by newspaper reporters". The relatives gather, but none of them want to be responsible for caring for the young infant, as the parents were heavily in debt and therefore had no substantial inheritances of any kind. Eventually an aunt of the father arrives and takes the boy back to her home in Virginia.

Aunt Glosspan, who is 70 but looks half her age, lives in an isolated cottage. "She was a strict vegetarian and regarded the consumption of animal flesh as not only unhealthy and disgusting, but horribly cruel." Her name is derived from Pangloss, Candide's teacher from Voltaire's novel of that name. When Lexington is 6, Glosspan decides to home-school him, partially because she is afraid that the public schools will serve him meat. She describes the horrors of meat-eating to him on one occasion. One of the subjects she teaches him is cooking and he takes to it extremely well. He takes over cooking duties for the house at age 10. Eventually he begins to invent his own recipes, making them from all sorts of vegetarian items. He is so skilled that she suggests that he write a cookbook, and he agrees. The book is to be titled Eat Good and Healthy.

Seven years later, Lexington has 9,000 original recipes in his book. Aunt Glosspan dies and he buries her. He finds that she has left him 100 dollars in an envelope with a note telling him to get a death certificate from the local doctor in town (he has not been in town since he was 13 days old). He is then to go to New York City to see her lawyer, Mr. Zuckermann. First, he goes to the doctor, who is at first bewildered that she is dead, then gives Lexington the death certificate after learning that Lexington had buried her "six or seven feet [1.8 or 2.1 m] down … about eight hours [ago]."

When he reaches New York, Mr. Zuckermann cons the naive youth into accepting gratefully only $15,000 of the $500,000 fortune Aunt Glosspan left him. He goes into a nearby diner and is served roast pork and cabbage without knowing what it is. He loves the dish so much that his enthusiasm bewilders the staff. However, through bribes, he is able to find out what he has just eaten, and is utterly confused to hear that he has had pig's flesh, which should, according to Aunt Glosspan, taste horrible. The waiter argues that she must not have known how to cook it properly. Through further bribes, he talks with the cook, wanting to learn everything about how to cook pork. The cook says that it is probably pig's flesh, claiming "that it might have been a piece of human stuff." When Lexington hears that the cook did not butcher the pig himself but got it from a packing-house, he decides to go there himself to learn more.

Lexington arrives and gets in a line for a guided tour. When he asks the others waiting if they were also writing cookbooks, the grownups "merely smiled mysteriously to themselves". He watches as others go through the doors before him: a mother with two little boys, a young couple, and a pale woman with white long gloves. Finally, his turn is called and he is led to the "shackling area" where the pigs are grabbed, looped about the ankle with a chain, and then dragged up through a hole in the roof. While he is watching, one of the workers slips a chain around Lexington's ankle and, before he knows what is happening, he is being dragged along the path as well. Lexington cries for help to no avail and he is carried along to the sticker, who slices open the boy's jugular vein with a knife. As the belt moves on and Lexington begins to feel faint, he sees the pigs ahead being dropped into a large cauldron of boiling water. One of the "pigs" seems to be wearing white long gloves. Lexington dies and he passes on "out of this, the best of all possible worlds, into the next".

== Occurrences ==
In I Am a Strange Loop (2007), Douglas Hofstadter mentions "Pig" as an influence which made him turn to vegetarianism.
