= Genesis and Catastrophe: A True Story =

Short story by Roald Dahl

- Short story by Roald Dahl

Publication
- Published in: Playboy
- Publication date: December 1959

"Genesis and Catastrophe: A True Story" is a short story written by Roald Dahl first published in Playboy magazine in December 1959 and included in his book Kiss Kiss (1960). It is a fictionalised account based upon a true historical incident. It is also known as A Fine Son.

== Plot summary ==
Klara, an Austrian woman, has just given birth to a son. She is fearful this child will die, as she has had three children previously, named Otto, Gustav and Ida, and all of them have died. Her husband, Alois, remarks how small and frail the new baby is, even compared to the others. The doctor and midwife assure the mother the baby is healthy. They beg the father to show more compassion toward his wife and to hope for the child's survival. The story ends with Klara praying, "He must live, Alois. He must, he must... Oh God, be merciful unto him now". It is revealed her son's name is Adolf Hitler, and that the characters are his parents Klara and Alois Hitler.

== Adaptations ==
An adaptation by Ronald Harwood of "Genesis and Catastrophe" formed the basis of a 1980 episode of the television series Tales of the Unexpected. and into a short film by director Jonathan Liebesman in 2000.

== See also ==
- Killing baby Hitler, a thought experiment in ethics
