= Royal Jelly (short story) =

Short story by Roald Dahl

Publication
- Published in: Kiss Kiss
- Publication type: Short-story collection
- Publisher: Michael Joseph
- Publication date: 1960

"Royal Jelly" is a short horror story by Roald Dahl. It was included in Dahl's 1960 collection Kiss Kiss and his 1979 collection Tales of the Unexpected, and later published as a standalone volume in 2011 and included in the February 1983 issue of Twilight Zone Magazine.

== Plot summary ==
Albert and Mabel Taylor have a newborn baby daughter. Mabel, the mother is frightened because the child will not eat and has been losing weight since birth. Albert, a beekeeper, devises the novel solution of adding royal jelly, used to make bee larvae grow, to the baby's milk. The baby begins to drink ravenously, getting fatter.

Albert admits to putting royal jelly in their daughter's milk, and Mabel asks him to stop. He tries to soothe his wife by explaining its nutritional value as stated in several magazines. Despite his wife's continued objections, Albert continues to add royal jelly to his daughter's milk, resulting in her growing larger. Finally Albert admits that he himself ate royal jelly in an effort to increase his fertility, which obviously worked as their daughter was conceived soon after.

Mabel begins to realise how much her husband resembles a gigantic bee, and how their daughter looks like a large grub. At the end, Albert says, "Why don't you cover her up, Mabel? We don't want our little queen to catch a cold."

== Adaptation ==
"Royal Jelly" was adapted as an episode of the television series Tales of the Unexpected in 1980, including Timothy West and Susan George as the couple.
