= Kiss Kiss (book) =

1960 short story collection by Roald Dahl

- Dust-jacket from the first edition
- Author: Roald Dahl
- Language: English
- Genre: Macabre, suspense, conte cruel, short stories
- Publisher: Alfred A. Knopf
- Publication date: 1960
- Publication place: United States
- Media type: Print (hardback)
- Pages: 309 pp

Kiss Kiss is a collection of short stories by Roald Dahl, first published in 1960 by Alfred A. Knopf. Several of the constituent stories had been previously published elsewhere.

== Contents ==
It contains the following short stories:

- "The Landlady" (first appeared in The New Yorker magazine, November 28, 1959)
- "William and Mary"
- "The Way Up to Heaven" (first appeared in The New Yorker magazine, February 27, 1954)
- "Parson's Pleasure"
- "Mrs. Bixby and the Colonel's Coat"
- "Royal Jelly"
- "Georgy Porgy"
- "Genesis and Catastrophe: A True Story"
- "Edward the Conqueror" (first appeared in The New Yorker magazine, October 31, 1953)
- "Pig"
- "The Champion of the World" (first appeared in The New Yorker magazine, January 31, 1959)

"The Champion of the World" is a condensed version of the story that would become Dahl's 1975 children's book Danny the Champion of the World.

== Editions ==
- Knopf, New York, 1960, 309 pp.
- McCleland, Toronto, 1960
- M. Joseph, London, 1960, 255 pp.
- Hayakawa, Japan, 1961, Paperback, Japanese as Tales of Menace 1
- Dell:F128, New York, 1961, 288 pp., paperback
- Bonnier, Stockholm, 1961, Swedish as Puss puss
- Penguin:1832, Harmondsworth, 1962, 233 pp., paperback, ISBN 0-14-001832-8 (1973 reprint)
- Feltrinelli, Milano, 1964, 276 pp, Italian as Kiss Kiss: 11 storie macabre (con humour)
- Rowohlt, Reinbek, German as Küsschen, Küsschen

=== Audiobook ===
Unabridged recordings have been made of all 11 stories and released by Penguin Audiobooks. These are available individually as audio downloads, or together in a CD collection. The narrators are Stephanie Beacham, Juliet Stevenson, Derek Jacobi, Adrian Scarborough, Stephen Mangan and Tamsin Greig.

== Critical response ==
Lorna Bradbury, Deputy Literary Editor for The Daily Telegraph, listed the collection as one of "25 Classic Novels for Teenagers." Zoe Chace of NPR told interviewer Cara Philbin her reactions during reading the collection as a child: "Kiss Kiss is for grown-ups...It was actually the marriages that I remember feeling the worst about...Reading Kiss Kiss is one of the first times I can remember a real-life truth staring back at me from a book. I hadn't yet thought about the nasty tricks adults play on each other just to hurt each other. Particularly, married adults who aren't in love and who might know the other's weakness best. My imagination matured."

== See also ==
- Switch Bitch (1974) collection of short stories
- Tales of the Unexpected (book)
