= Georgy Porgy (short story) =

1960 short story by Roald Dahl

- Short story by Roald Dahl
- Country: United Kingdom
- Language: English
- Genre: Horror

Publication
- Published in: Kiss Kiss
- Publication type: Short-story collection
- Publisher: Michael Joseph
- Publication date: 1960

"Georgy Porgy" is a 1960 horror short story by Roald Dahl, published in his 1960 book Kiss Kiss. The title is derived from "Georgie Porgie", a 19th-century English nursery rhyme. The story is about a neurotic and celibate vicar, George, who is pursued by lustful spinsters in his country parish.

== Plot summary ==
The story is narrated by a sexually repressed vicar, George, who dislikes any kind of physical contact with women, though he appreciates their beauty. His anxieties may stem from a memory of his late mother, who, seeking to educate her young son, showed him a rabbit giving birth in a cage in their garage. The rabbit, however, then swallowed its baby whole, and George fled terrified into the night. His mother pursued, but was struck and killed by a car.

George's repression becomes a problem in the village where his parish is, as the local spinsters try to seduce him. Constantly but painfully rebuffed by George, the spinsters increase their efforts to ensnare him over a period of years, and in an effort to understand their psychology he performs an experiment with rats taken from a choirboy. He separates males from females for three weeks, estimating a translation into three years of human abstinence. He then puts all the rats in the same box, dividing the sexes with a small electric fence. The first rat to try to breach the fence is male, but from that point forth only the females try crossing it, killing themselves one by one as they grow more desperate to reach the males. From these results George draws the conclusion that women are naturally predatory and sexually driven, absolving himself from any blame in the spinsters' behaviour. He decides to cultivate a cold and severe manner, thereby deterring further advances.

He is invited to a party hosted by Lady Birdwell, at which he is distant and sardonic with every woman he meets. That is until Miss Roach, a handsome and kindly middle-aged spinster, makes him what she says is a soft fruit drink. He loosens up (it is implied Miss Roach spiked his drink with alcohol), agrees to walk alone with her, and they end up in a summer house where George, apparently in a state of intoxication, starts kissing Miss Roach. She then appears to open her mouth into a large, daunting cave and, like the rabbit George saw as a boy, swallow him whole. He tries clinging to bits of her mouth, but slips easily down her throat until he lands in her stomach, where he meets several other men, mostly in white coats.

The implication is that, after attacking Miss Roach in the summer house, he was sectioned, and the men are doctors. From "inside" Miss Roach he hears the spinsters call him a "sex maniac" and "sadist", while it's suggested he maimed Miss Roach's mouth. He's happy to be where he is, however, because he worries that if he gets out the spinsters will catch him. The story ends with another man, possibly a psychiatrist, trying to convince George to escape with him, but George insists they are safer where they are.

== Adaptations ==
The story was dramatised in series two, episode nine of Tales of the Unexpected, first broadcast April 26, 1980. It was written by Robin Chapman and directed by Graham Evans. Joan Collins played both George's mother and Miss Roach. George was played by John Alderton.
