= My Lady Love, My Dove =

Short story by Roald Dahl

- Short story by Roald Dahl
- Country: United Kingdom
- Language: English

Publication
- Published in: The New Yorker
- Publication type: Magazine
- Publication date: 13 June 1952

"My Lady Love, My Dove" is a short story by British writer Roald Dahl, originally published in The New Yorker on 13 June 1952. It later appeared in the collection Someone Like You (1953). The story concerns a wealthy middle-aged couple who entertain a younger couple for dinner and games of Bridge, which they all play at a high level. By hiding a microphone in their guest bedroom, they discover something entirely unexpected about their guests.

== Plot summary ==
Arthur and Pamela Beauchamp live comfortable lives. Pamela is a formidable woman of some wealth. Arthur, a former radio engineer and the first-person narrator, professes to adore her despite her domineering ways. He busies himself with his hobby preparing and studying butterflies.

They are expecting a young couple, Henry and Sally Snape, for an overnight stay that will include dinner and games of Bridge. The Snapes have a reputation as top-flight players, and the Beauchamps are eager to take them on. Pamela, however, has taken a dislike to the Snapes and wants to have some fun at their expense. She coerces Arthur into placing a microphone in the guest room they will use, allowing her to hear them on the radio in their own bedroom. Arthur goes about this in his methodical way, barely completing the exercise before the guests arrive.

The evening is a success, especially for the Snapes who out-play their hosts. The stakes are "ten shillings a hundred" for game points. Apart from a serious error by Sally Snape, costing her and Henry 800 points, the hosts are likely to owe their guests a considerable amount.

When the parties retire, Pamela eagerly goes with Arthur to listen in on the Snapes in their room. They are shocked to hear their guests arguing about Sally's mistake, and then rehearsing the cues and signals they have been using to cheat. They apparently make their living cheating at Bridge, using verbal cues and gestures to show the contents of their hands to each other.

Pamela quickly recovers. She insists that she and Arthur start rehearsing their own cheating methods immediately. Arthur has no option but to comply.
