= Skin (short story) =

Short story by Roald Dahl

- Short story by Roald Dahl

Publication
- Published in: The New Yorker
- Publication date: 1952

"Skin" is a macabre short story written by Roald Dahl. It was first published in the 17 May 1952 issue of The New Yorker, and was later featured in the collections Someone Like You, published in 1953, and Skin and Other Stories, published in 2000. It was adapted for television as part of Anglia Television's Tales of the Unexpected, and broadcast on 8 March 1980.

== Plot summary ==
A destitute old man named Drioli walks through the streets of Paris. When he passes by an art gallery and sees a painting by Chaïm Soutine, he reminisces about a time long-ago when they were friends. Over thirty years earlier, Soutine had been in love with Drioli's wife Josie, and on a particular day in autumn 1913, Drioli, a tattoo artist, had been fortunate to work on nine clients, most of whom had paid in cash. This resulted in unusually large earnings for that day, and Drioli had decided to celebrate by buying their fill of bottles of wine. When he had become drunk, he asked Soutine to paint a picture of Josie on Drioli's back and then tattoo over it, which Soutine agreed to; once taught how to by Drioli and discussing the artistic merits of tattooing, Soutine is pleased enough with the resultant artwork to sign it. After the First World War Soutine was discovered by a dealer and sent to Céret, and Drioli and Josie moved their tattoo business to Le Havre. During the Second World War Josie died in a bombing incident, and in his grief Drioli lost his business, being forced into panhandling.

Drioli enters an art gallery that is showing an exhibition of Soutine's work. The proprietor tries to remove Drioli, who then reveals the incredible tattoo by Soutine that is on his back. Several people attending the exhibition make bids for the tattoo, also inquiring after Drioli's health because the picture does not have much value as long as he is alive. Two men in particular offer unusual proposals. One says he will pay for a skin-grafting operation so that the artwork may be removed from Drioli's back, and that he will also pay for the artwork thus obtained; other patrons warn that at such poor health and advanced age, Drioli would never survive the skin-grafting surgery. The other man, claiming to be the owner of the Bristol Hotel in Cannes, offers that Drioli becomes an employee of sorts at said hotel and live instead a life of luxury and leisure while exhibiting his back to the guests whilst sunning and drinking cocktails at his private beach. Drioli, who is hungry, accepts the latter's proposal and leaves the gallery with him.

The narrator then explains that there is no Bristol Hotel in Cannes, and that a heavily varnished painting matching the description of Drioli's tattoo turned up for sale at an auction in Buenos Aires a few weeks later, and that this "causes one to wonder a little, and to pray for the old man's health, and to hope fervently that wherever he may be at this moment, there is a plump attractive girl to manicure the nails of his fingers, and a maid to bring him breakfast in bed in the mornings".

== Reception ==
Groff Conklin in 1954 called the story "a hair-curling slice of macabre".
