= Dip in the Pool =

1952 short story by Roald Dahl

- Short story by Roald Dahl
- Country: United Kingdom
- Language: English

Publication
- Published in: The New Yorker
- Publication type: Magazine
- Publication date: 19 January 1952

"Dip in the Pool" is a macabre short story by British writer Roald Dahl, originally published in the 19 January 1952 edition of The New Yorker. It later appeared in the collection Someone Like You (1953).

== Plot summary ==
On a British cruise ship, there is a betting pool wherein passengers try to correctly guess the number of miles the ship will travel that day, within ten miles above ("high field") or below ("low field") the captain's own guess.

On a stormy day, a passenger named William Botibol bids £200 (equivalent to £5,000 in 2025) on "low field", the inclement weather having significantly slowed down the ship. He is gambling largely with money he does not have (it represents years of his and his wife's savings), but he views it as worth the risk.

The next morning, Botibol wakes up to find the sky is clear and the ship is moving very fast to make up for lost time. Horrified, he decides that to slow down the ship he will jump overboard, dressed as if for tennis so he can easily swim. This way, the ship will have to stop and turn around to rescue him.

Seeking out potential eyewitnesses, Botibol ventures to the rear of the ship where he encounters an elderly woman. After striking up a casual conversation to ensure that she notices him and will raise the alarm when he falls into the water, he then surreptitiously leaps off the end of the ship. Yelling for help as he plunges into the water beneath him, he captures the woman's attention. Initially, she seems unsure how to react, but she eventually relaxes and watches as Botibol, arms waving madly and shouting, disappears into the distance.

A matronly woman, evidently a caregiver, soon arrives on the deck and reprimands the older woman for wandering off without her. The older woman does not reply directly but instead comments offhandedly about a man who "dived overboard... with all his clothes on" – a remark that earns a stern "Nonsense!" from the caregiver. The elderly woman – who, unbeknownst to Botibol, is evidently a dementia patient – allows the caregiver to lead her away across the deck, saying "Such a nice man. He waved to me."

== Television adaptations ==
In 1958, the story was adapted for television by Alfred Hitchcock for his anthology program Alfred Hitchcock Presents. The Daily Telegraph called the adaptation "another wickedly gleeful Dahl tale of death and fatuity".

The story was also adapted for a 1979 episode of Tales of the Unexpected. (Note: Although a later Dahl story, Mr. Botibol, also features a protagonist with the same surname, the two stories are otherwise unconnected. Nevertheless, when the two stories were adapted for Tales of the Unexpected, the same actor (Jack Weston) was cast as Botibol in both episodes.)
