= Galloping Foxley =

1953 short story by Roald Dahl

- Short story by Roald Dahl
- Language: English
- Genre: Fiction

Publication
- Published in: Town & Country
- Publication type: Magazine
- Publication date: 1953

"Galloping Foxley" is a short story by Roald Dahl first published in Town & Country in 1953. It was included in the short-story collection Someone Like You, and was later adapted into an episode of Tales of The Unexpected.

== Published story ==
"Galloping Foxley", which Dahl claimed was based on a true story, is about a man named William Perkins, described as a "contented commuter" but in fact obsessed by routine. Every day he arrives at the station and catches the same train, taking the same seat in the carriage. One day his routine is shattered by the arrival of a newcomer who takes first his place at the station, and then sits in the carriage Perkins normally has to himself.

The outraged Perkins slowly realises he recognises the newcomer as a former schoolmate; but the newcomer clearly does not recognize Perkins, allowing the author to fill the void. The newcomer is Bruce Foxley. At school, Foxley was a prefect who used Perkins as his personal slave, viciously abusing him mentally and physically. Indeed, the name "Galloping Foxley" is in recognition of the way Foxley would take a run-up when delivering a beating.

After reliving his troubled past with Foxley in his mind, Perkins musters up the courage to introduce himself to the man as William Perkins, who attended Repton School in 1907. To his surprise, the man opposite states he is pleased to meet him, before introducing himself as Jocelyn Fortescue, who went to Eton College in 1916.

== Television episode ==
The ending used in Tales of The Unexpected differs from the original written version. In the short story, Perkins decides to seek revenge by publicly humiliating Foxley. He introduces himself and without a shred of emotion Foxley introduces himself but he gives a different name and school. This ending, while ambiguous – the man could indeed be Foxley and simply lying to confuse and humiliate Perkins – has the implication that the man is not Foxley at all and Perkins has simply been wrong all along.

In the television version, however, Perkins creates a scene and recounts to the other passengers the misery he suffered at the hands of the newcomer. Again the newcomer shows no emotion but denies being Foxley and gives a different name and school. However, he gives a knowing look and rests his cane on his shoulder exactly as the viewer saw Foxley do earlier on.
