= William and Mary (short story) =

Short story by Roald Dahl

- Short story by Roald Dahl
- Country: United Kingdom
- Language: English

Publication
- Published in: Kiss Kiss
- Publication type: Short-story collection
- Publisher: Michael Joseph
- Publication date: 1960

"William and Mary" is a short story by Roald Dahl, originally published in his 1960 collection Kiss Kiss. It was later adapted into episodes of Way Out, Late Night Horror and Tales of the Unexpected, as well as The Price of Fear.

== Plot summary ==
Mary Pearl receives a note from her recently deceased husband, William, a man given to emotional abuse due to his controlling nature.

The letter tells how Landy, a doctor, approached William about his cancer six weeks before William's death. He suggested William undertake a procedure, which he explains in great detail. His brain would be transplanted from his body after death, and attached to an artificial heart. The brain would be bathing in a Ringer's solution. One of his eyes could also be retained, as the optic nerve is essentially an extension of the brain. Although the doctor is uncertain whether the brain would regain consciousness, he remains hopeful.

William initially reacted violently to this suggestion, but by the end of their discussion has warmed to the idea. He was initially concerned with the idea of phantom limb, believing that as a brain alone he may be in terrible trauma, wishing for the use of his body. However, he writes, he eventually embraced the idea, being very fond of his brain and liking the suggestion that it could live on. He adds that by the time she reads the letter, the procedure should have been undertaken a week earlier, and suggests she contact Landy.

She reflects on his many instances of reproach towards her behavior and is outraged that he might have undergone such a "perverse" operation. Mary has been rebelling against her husband's restrictions after his death: she has bought a television and is smoking, both actions William had disapproved of. However, she ultimately contacts Landy.

The procedure has gone as well as could be expected, and William had regained consciousness within two days. His connected eye also appears to be functioning properly. Mary finds the previously dominating William to be attractive in his helplessness and wishes to take him back home, asserting right of ownership over her husband's "remains". Landy, not at all expecting such a reaction, tells her she should stick to being a widow, and finds her newfound happiness revolting.

William sees Mary smoking, and is infuriated by it, his eye registering a look of fury. Mary departs, but not before blowing the cigarette smoke in William's eye.

== Analysis ==
According to Elizabeth Van Haegenborgh, Mary's wish to bring William home with her can be interpreted as a perverse desire for revenge against her controlling husband by flaunting her independence before his now helpless state.
