= The Way Up to Heaven =

"The Way up to Heaven"
- Short story by Roald Dahl

Publication
- Published in: The New Yorker
- Publication type: Magazine
- Publication date: 27 February 1954

"The Way Up to Heaven" is a macabre short story by Roald Dahl. It was originally published in The New Yorker, as were some of the other short stories that would later be reprinted in the 1960 collection Kiss Kiss.

== Plot summary ==
Mr and Mrs Foster are a wealthy married couple living in a six-story house in New York. Mrs Foster has recently begun to suspect her husband, Eugene, of deliberately exacerbating her pathological fear of tardiness. She is continuously badgered by Eugene, who seems to make a habit of waiting until the last minute to leave the house.

After months of persuading her husband to let her go, Mrs Foster is preparing for a six-week trip to Paris by herself, where their daughter and three grandchildren (whom they have not yet met) reside. After letting his wife wait anxiously for some time, Mr Foster finally gets into the car to see her off. On their way, he tells her how he has dismissed the household servants for the duration of her vacation (against his wife's advice) while he will stay at his club. When they arrive at the airport, Mrs Foster finds that despite being behind schedule, her flight is temporarily postponed until the next day due to a thick fog. Mrs Foster decides to get a room near the airport for the night, but her husband insists that she come home.

The next day while attempting to leave for the airport without her husband, things finally come to a head. After the usual rounds of teasing his wife's delicate psyche, Eugene demands that he be driven to his club (which is in the opposite direction of the airport and therefore complicating the journey even more). Mr Foster tries to foil his wife for the last time by claimin that he has mistakenly left a present for their daughter in the house. He insists on looking for the gift himself and goes back inside. While he pretends to search their home, Mrs Foster finds the present down the side of one of the car seats, and can't help but notice "it was wedged down firm and deep, as though with the help of a pushing hand". Mrs Foster rushes to retrieve her husband as quickly as possible, but hears a series of unspecified noises from inside their home and has a sudden change of heart. To the surprise of the driver, Mrs Foster returns immediately to the car and demands to be driven to the airport at once, stating that her husband will understand and will get a cab to the club.

Mrs Foster enjoys her time in Paris, at last meeting and getting to know her grandchildren, and writing to her husband weekly. When the trip comes to a close, Mrs Foster suggests that she will soon return to Paris permanently to be near her grandchildren.

The visit concludes, and she flies back to New York. Upon landing, she notes that her husband has not sent a car to meet her. After arriving home, she enters and notices a large pile of mail under the letterbox, as well as a strange odor. She does a quick lap around the first floor and, seemingly satisfied, calls the elevator company to report the home's apparently broken lift. The story closes with Mrs Foster waiting for the arrival of the lift repair man. (The implication is that Mrs Foster deliberately left her husband to die trapped in the broken elevator.)

== Adaptations ==
"The Way Up to Heaven" was dramatized in a 1957 episode of Alfred Hitchcock's television show Suspicion (Season 1, Episode 29), and subsequently in a 1979 episode of Tales of the Unexpected (Season 1, Episode 9). In the Tales of the Unexpected episode, the Fosters' home is moved to Hampstead, London and Mr Foster becomes an Englishman, but Mrs Foster is depicted as an American expatriate (played by Julie Harris) returning to New York by air.
