= Taste (short story) =

1951 short story by Roald Dahl

- Short story by Roald Dahl
- Language: English

Publication
- Publisher: The New Yorker
- Publication date: December 8, 1951

"Taste" is a short story by Roald Dahl that was first published in the December 8 1951 edition of The New Yorker and was included in the 1953 collection Someone Like You.

== Plot summary ==
There are six people eating a fine dinner at the house of Mike Schofield, a London stockbroker: Mike, his wife and daughter, an unnamed narrator and his wife, and a wine connoisseur, Richard Pratt. Pratt often makes small bets with Schofield to guess what wine is being served at the table, but during the night in the story he is uninterested, instead attempting to socialize with Schofield's eighteen-year-old daughter, Louise.

When Schofield brings the second wine of the night he remarks that it will be impossible to guess where it is from, but Pratt takes that as a challenge. The tough talk on both sides leads the two to increase the bet until Pratt declares that he would like to bet for the hand of Schofield's daughter in marriage — if he loses, he will give Schofield both of his houses. Though his wife and daughter are horrified, Mike eventually convinces them to accept the bet — it is simply too good a deal to pass up, especially since he is sure the wine will be impossible to identify.

However, Pratt gradually proceeds to name the exact district, commune, vineyard, and the year of the wine. At this moment, however, the maid walks in and returns to Pratt his glasses, which he had left on the cabinet in the study earlier in the evening where the bottle had been left out to reach room temperature. (Pratt had picked out this place in the study on an earlier visit as the ideal place to sit the wine — his glasses being left there reveals that he knew the wine in advance and cheated on the bet.) With Pratt's deception having been revealed to all the table, Mike's wife pleads with him to calm down as he sits up angrily in his chair.

== Adaptations ==
- The story was turned into a one-act opera "A Question of Taste" by William Schuman in 1989.
- "Taste" was adapted into a 1980 episode of the show Tales of the Unexpected.
- The 2015 Russian short film Taste (Vkus) directed by Ekaterina Krasner is adapted from Taste by Roald Dahl.
