= Edward the Conqueror =

1953 short story by Roald Dahl

- Short story by Roald Dahl
- Country: United States
- Language: English

Publication
- Published in: The New Yorker
- Publication date: 31 October 1953

"Edward the Conqueror" is a short story written by Roald Dahl and first published in the 31 October 1953 issue of The New Yorker.

== Plot summary ==
A long-haired silver cat is nearly burnt in the bonfire Edward has set up for the autumn leaves, but his wife Louisa rescues it. After the couple unsuccessfully attempt to send the cat back to its home, Edward decides that if the cat does not leave by the afternoon, he will ask the police to make sure it is returned home.

While Louisa is admiring the cat's colour, she notices it has warts on his face. Louisa begins to play one of her daily concerts on the piano, a solitary pleasure that also seems to be one of her greatest passions, and chooses pieces by Vivaldi, Schumann, Liszt and Brahms. Immediately, the cat reacts strongly, and it even appears to be "appreciating the work". The cat seems to be especially enthralled when Louisa plays Liszt's Petrarch Sonnets and Der Weihnachtsbaum, but less impressed with Schumann's Kinderszenen.

Louisa becomes convinced the cat is the reincarnation of Liszt, and informs her husband. Edward is not convinced, even when his wife shows him the cat's reaction to the piano music. Edward believes the reactions to simply be a trick it was trained to perform, and refuses to take part in his wife's excitement (it is implied he is not as fond of music as Louisa). Louisa decides to go to the library to find out more about both Liszt and reincarnation. The book she checks out on reincarnation is assertive about how long it takes one to be reincarnated, stating it takes longer if your social status is higher. The book also says you cannot come back as a lower form of animal — a fact Louisa chooses to ignore. Finally, it mentions historical figures who were, it suggests, reincarnations of one another: (Epictetus, for instance, is said to have come back as Ralph Waldo Emerson). Despite her incredulity, Louisa appears to believe what she is reading. She greets Edward returning from his work by saying, "Listen, my dear, did you know that Theodore Roosevelt was once Caesar's wife?"

When she gets back from the library she calls for Liszt and examines him. She notices the cat's warts are positioned on its face in exactly the same positions as those on Liszt's face. She even notices the cat seems to dislike one particular Chopin scherzo, the only piece of Chopin's which Liszt himself did not love. By this time, Edward has become noticeably antagonistic to his wife's belief, perhaps spurred on by jealousy. Her plans are to tell the world, after which, she believes, all the world's musicians will want to come and meet her cat. Edward thinks her plans will make the two of them look like fools.

Louisa decides to cook a fancy dinner for the cat, and refuses to let her husband sway her. When she returns from the kitchen, she sees Edward coming in from the garden with black smoke, wet trouser cuffs, and long scratches from his wrist to his knuckle — the implication being he has thrown the cat on the fire. Louisa is horrified and falls into hysterics as Edward tries to calm her down.

== Television adaptation ==
When this story was adapted for television in a 1979 episode of Tales of the Unexpected (Season 1, Episode 7), the ending was slightly changed. As Louisa deduces her husband has thrown the cat on the fire, she grabs a knife and it is implied she attacks him. However, in the final scene, the cat enters the house through a window, fine after all.
