= Parson's Pleasure (short story) =

Short story by Roald Dahl

- Short story by Roald Dahl

Publication
- Published in: Esquire
- Publication date: 1 April 1958

"Parson's Pleasure" is a short story written by Roald Dahl, first published in Esquire in April 1958, and collected in Dahl's 1960 book Kiss Kiss.

== Plot ==
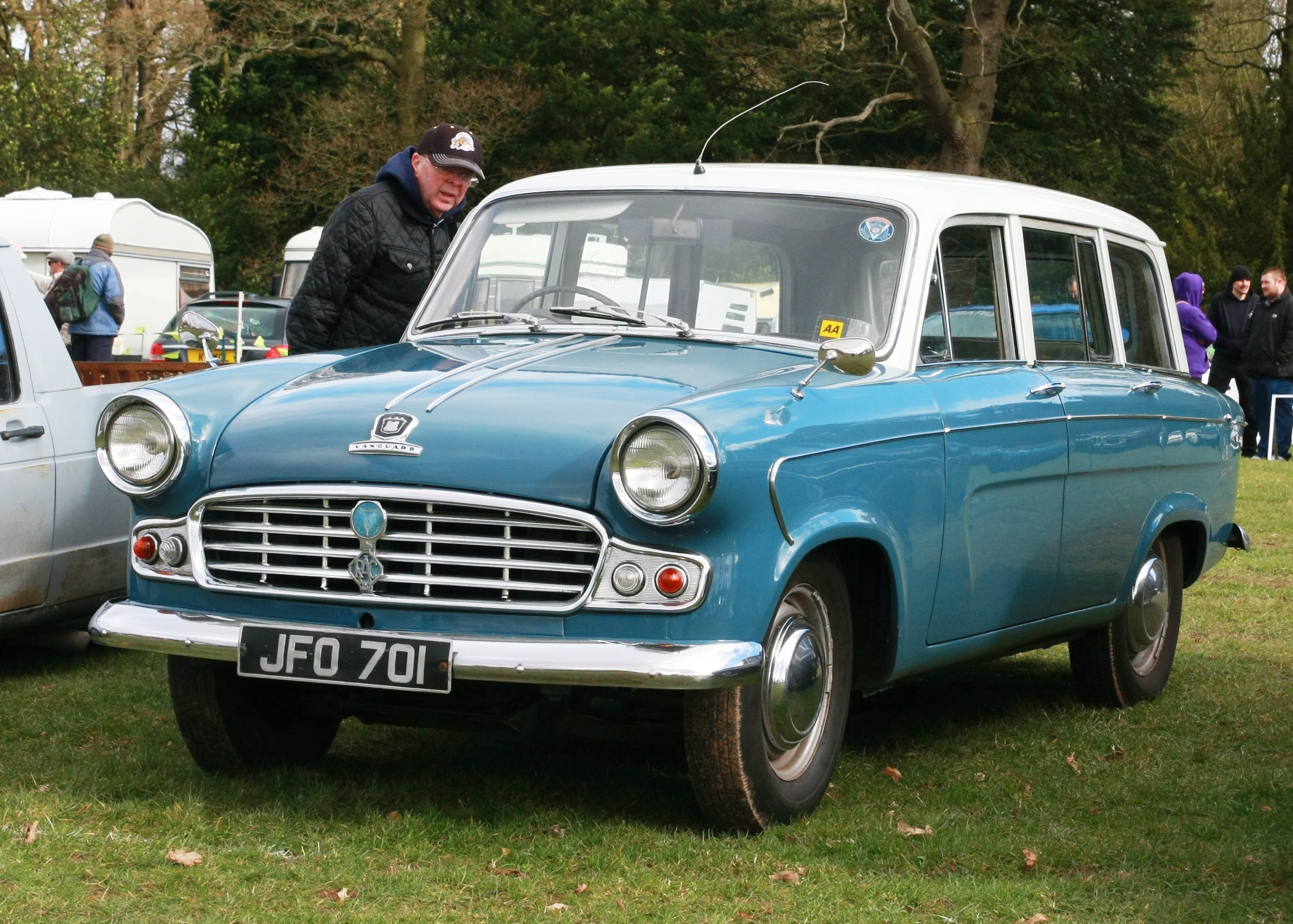
A Standard Vanguard 6 as used by Boggis to transport the furniture in the Tales of the Unexpected episode

Cyril Boggis is a skilled antiques dealer who has a small shop in Chelsea, London. He manages to make a profit each year by buying valuable furniture cheaply from unsuspecting country people while posing as a parson and president of the Society for the Preservation of Rare Furniture. He gains entry to their houses in the guise of cataloguing their old furniture; if he sees something he can re-sell, he offers to buy it. In order to buy the furniture for less than it is worth he uses his knowledge and a number of tricks, such as substituting machine-made screws for the genuine old ones.

One trip sees him exploring Buckinghamshire. After leaving his station wagon hidden so as not to spoil his image as an old clergyman, he walks to a rundown farmhouse where he meets three locals – the farmer Rummins, his son Bert, and their associate Claud – in the yard. On being allowed into the farmhouse to have a look at the furniture, he finds a priceless Chippendale commode in the lounge, one that matches the three famous existing pieces known as 'The Chippendale Commodes'. He tells the men he needs a new set of legs for a table he owns, and he asks for the ones on the commode. He convinces a reluctant Rummins that the piece is not worth anything as it is an "imitation". He buys it for £20 (equivalent to £407 in 2025), intending to sell it for £20,000 (equivalent to £407,000 in 2025).

While Boggis goes away to get his vehicle the three men decide to help the parson; they assume his car will not be big enough to easily carry the commode and fear he will lose interest in the deal once he discovers the piece will not fit inside. Since he is only requesting the legs, the farmers saw them off. With some difficulty they chop the remainder of the commode up, since Boggis called it 'firewood' and they feel they must fit all of it in. As they wait for Boggis to return, they comment that the commode was made by a 'bloody good carpenter no matter what the parson says'.

== Television adaptations ==
| Year | TV show | Episode | Starring | Notes |
|---|---|---|---|---|
| 1965 | Thirty-Minute Theatre | Season 1, Episode 1 | Richard Pearson | This episode is believed lost. |
| 1980 | Tales of the Unexpected | Season 3, Episode 6 | John Gielgud | |

== Movies ==
| Year | Movie | Starring |
|---|---|---|
| 2012 | Чиппендейл (Chippendale) | Виктор Сухоруков (Viktor Sukhorukov) |
