= Neck (short story) =

Short story by Roald Dahl

- Short story by Roald Dahl
- Country: United Kingdom
- Language: English

Publication
- Published in: Someone like You
- Publication type: Short-story collection
- Publisher: Alfred A. Knopf
- Publication date: 1953

"Neck" is a short story by Roald Dahl. It first appeared in his 1953 collection Someone like You, which consists of 18 short stories.

== Plot summary ==
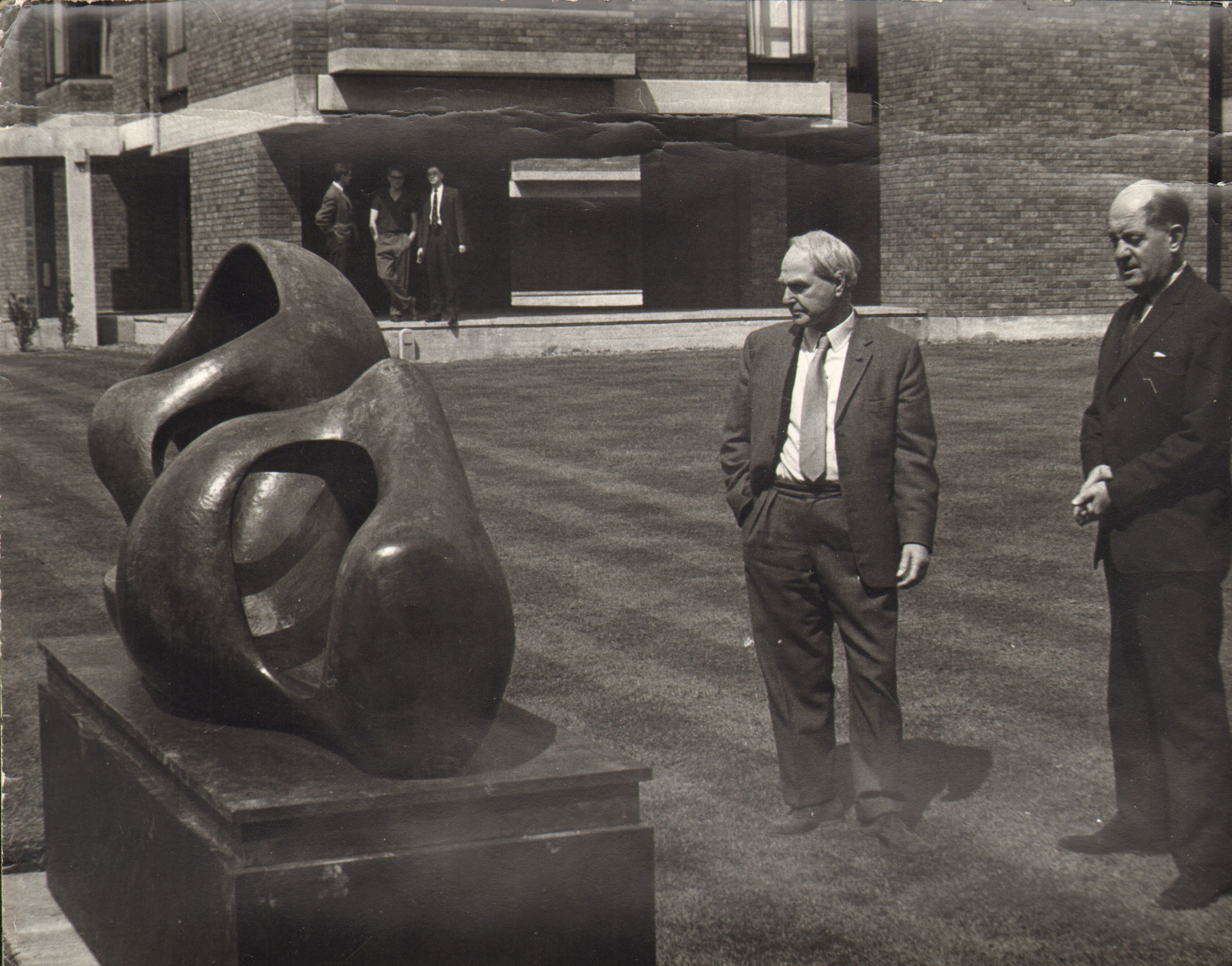
Dahl's story was inspired by the modernist, organic sculptures of Henry Moore (pictured with one of his sculptures)

Upon inheriting his father's newspaper and magazine empire, Sir Basil Turton suddenly finds himself the most sought-after bachelor in London society. Much to everyone's surprise, he marries a virtually unknown Continental European named Natalia. Sir Basil being little interested in anything other than his art collection, the new Lady Turton assumes control of the Turton Press, becoming in the process a major player in the political arena.

Six years after the marriage, the narrator of the story, a society columnist, finds himself seated next to the imperious Lady Turton at a dinner party. When she at long last takes notice of him, she bombards him with a series of personal questions, during the course of which he mentions his love of art. Lady Turton uninterestedly invites him to see Sir Basil's collection at their house in the country and the narrator eagerly accepts.

Arriving at the estate the following Saturday, the narrator is impressed by the extravagant topiary with large trees trimmed into a variety of shapes, including a complete chess set, and the many sculptures and statues on the grounds. Over the course of the evening, the narrator perceives Major Haddock, another guest for the weekend, is infatuated with Lady Turton, who does not rebuff his advances. It is also obvious to the narrator that the butler, Jelks, holds her ladyship in contempt for the cruel way she treats Sir Basil; Jelks has offered, in return for a third of the narrator's card winnings over the weekend, to give him hints on Lady Turton's strategies at the card table.

The next day, the gracious Sir Basil takes the narrator on a tour around the vast estate. Stopping to rest, the two men sit on a bench overlooking the garden and begin chatting, at which time the narrator notices a woman wandering in the garden. She is soon joined by a man who is carrying in his hand a small camera. The two figures approach a piece of sculpture (a wooden piece by Henry Moore) and appear to be laughing at it. The man begins to take pictures while the woman strikes ludicrous poses beside the piece, at one point sticking her head through one of its holes. The man takes more pictures and, from the narrator's perspective, leans down and kisses the woman, her laughter filling the air.

It soon becomes apparent, however, that the woman cannot free her head from the sculpture, and, seeing the man is unable to release her, Sir Basil and the narrator make their way down to the garden; they find the two figures are Lady Turton and Major Haddock. As her ladyship angrily berates her husband, Sir Basil tells Jelks to fetch a saw so he can cut her out of the piece. When the butler returns with a saw in one hand and an axe in the other and offers the implements to his employer, the narrator notices the hand holding the axe is extended out further toward Sir Basil, as though Jelks is trying to coax him into using it instead of the saw. Sir Basil takes the axe. The narrator closes his eyes in anticipation of what is about to befall the terrified Lady Turton when he hears Sir Basil say, "Look here, Jelks. What on earth are you thinking about? This thing's much too dangerous. Give me the saw." The narrator looks at Lady Turton, who is pale-faced and gurgling incoherently with fear, and then at Sir Basil, who for the first time has the traces of a smile in his eyes.
