= Lamb to the Slaughter =

1953 short story by Roald Dahl

- Short story by Roald Dahl
- Country: United Kingdom
- Language: English

Publication
- Published in: Harper's Magazine
- Publication type: Magazine
- Publication date: September 1953

"Lamb to the Slaughter" is a 1953 short story by Roald Dahl. It was originally rejected, along with four other stories, by The New Yorker, but was published in Harper's Magazine in September 1953. The story was illustrated by Adolf Hallman. It was adapted for an episode of Alfred Hitchcock Presents (AHP) that starred Barbara Bel Geddes and Harold J. Stone. Originally broadcast on April 13, 1958, this was one of only 17 AHP episodes directed by Hitchcock. The episode was ranked #59 of the Top 100 Episodes by TV Guide in 2009. The story was adapted for Dahl's British TV series Tales of the Unexpected. Dahl included it in his short story collection Someone Like You. The narrative element of the housewife killing her husband and letting the policemen eat the evidence was used by Pedro Almodóvar in his 1984 movie What Have I Done to Deserve This?, with a ham bone.

According to Jason Hool, "Lamb to the Slaughter" demonstrates Dahl's fascination with horror (with elements of black comedy), which is seen in both his adult fiction and his stories for children. The story was suggested to Dahl by his friend Ian Fleming: "Why don't you have someone murder their husband with a frozen leg of mutton which she then serves to the detectives who come to investigate the murder?"

== Plot ==
Mary Maloney is a pregnant housewife waiting for her husband, Patrick, to return home from his job as a police detective. When he returns, Mary notices he is uncharacteristically aloof. Although it is not explicitly stated, it is suggested that Patrick has asked for a divorce because he is leaving his wife for another woman, as he assures Mary she "will be looked after."

Seemingly in a trance, Mary fetches a large leg of lamb from the deep freezer in the cellar to cook for their dinner. Patrick, his back to Mary, angrily calls to her not to make him any dinner, as he is going out. While he is looking out of the window, Mary suddenly strikes Patrick in the back of the head with the frozen leg of lamb, killing him instantly.

Mary realizes Patrick is dead and begins, coldly and practically, to think about what to do. Thinking about her unborn child, she decides to cover up the murder. She prepares the leg of lamb and places it in the oven to destroy the evidence, then considers an alibi. After practicing a cheerful mask and some innocuous remarks to make in conversation, she visits the grocer and chats blandly with him about what to make for Patrick's dinner. Upon her return to the house and to the room where her husband lies dead on the floor, she acts surprised and starts crying, then calls the police.

When the policemen who are all friends of Patrick arrive, they ask Mary questions and look at the scene. Considering Mary above suspicion, the police conclude Patrick was killed by an intruder with a large blunt object, likely made of metal. As the men search the house for the murder weapon, Mary offers them whiskey, distracting a few of them from the hunt through the house. After they make a fruitless search around the house and surrounding area, Mary is reminded the leg of lamb is just about done and offers it to the policemen. She points out they have already been working through and past the dinner hour and that the meat will otherwise go to waste; they hesitate but accept in the end. During the meal, as Mary sits in a nearby room, the policemen discuss the murder weapon's possible location. One officer, his mouth full of meat, says it is "probably right under our very noses." Mary, overhearing them, starts giggling.

== Adaptations ==
=== Alfred Hitchcock Presents ===
Hitchcock presents this episode from a supermarket setting, where he is given a ticket "for blocking an aisle during the rush hour", even though he claims to have been in the slow lane. In the story proper, Patrick declares that he is leaving Mary, played by Barbara Bel Geddes, for another woman. The adaptation otherwise follows the original story, with Harold J. Stone as the police detective in charge of the investigation. At the very end of the program, because network practices of the time would not allow a murderer to get away with their crimes, Hitchcock returns to explain that Mary Maloney finally was caught after trying to bump off her second husband in the same manner. Apparently, her second husband "was the forgetful type and had forgotten to plug in the freezer", making the meat "as soft as jelly".

=== Tales of the Unexpected ===
In 1979, the story was adapted by Robin Chapman for Roald Dahl's British television series Tales of the Unexpected, with Susan George as Mary and Brian Blessed as the police detective in charge of the investigation of her husband's murder. This episode ends slightly differently from the original story: having finished the leg of lamb, the four police officers get up and leave the kitchen. The last of them stops and turns back, looking intently at the leg bone resting on the serving platter. He then scrapes the contents of the platter into the kitchen bin.
