= The Landlady (short story) =

Short horror story by Roald Dahl

- Short story by Roald Dahl
- Genre: Horror

Publication
- Published in: The New Yorker
- Publication date: 28 November 1959

"The Landlady" is a short horror story by Roald Dahl. It initially appeared in The New Yorker, as did other short stories that would later be reprinted in the 1960 anthology, Kiss Kiss.

== Plot ==
Billy Weaver is a seventeen-year-old youth who has travelled by train from London to Bath to start a new job. Looking for lodgings, he comes across a boarding-house and feels strangely compelled by its sign saying "Bed and Breakfast". Through the window, he notices a parrot in a cage and a sleeping dachshund on the floor, which he finds comforting.

When he rings the doorbell, it is instantly answered by a middle-aged landlady. Billy discovers that her boarding house is extremely cheap, and finds the woman somewhat eccentric and absent-minded, but very kind.

When Billy signs her guest-book, he finds only two names, both dated more than two years ago: Christopher Mulholland and Gregory W. Temple – names which seem curiously familiar to Billy. The landlady invites Billy for some tea, and Billy tries to remember where he has previously heard the names in the guest book. He seems to recall that Mulholland was an Eton schoolboy whose disappearance was reported in the newspapers. The landlady assures Billy that her Mulholland was a Cambridge undergraduate, and that Mulholland and Temple are still staying upstairs in her boarding-house. She says that Billy is a handsome young man, as were the two other guests.

Billy is surprised to find that the parrot and dachshund he had seen through the window are both stuffed after he asks about them. The landlady says that she stuffs all her pets when they die. Billy finds that his tea tastes faintly of bitter almonds. He asks the landlady whether she has had any other guests since the two young men. The story ends as the landlady replies, "No, my dear. Only you."

The implication is that the landlady has poisoned Billy's tea with cyanide and intends to stuff his corpse, as she has already done to Mulholland and Temple.

== Origin ==
In the introduction to Roald Dahl's Book of Ghost Stories, a collection of fourteen stories by other writers that he chose as the genre's best, Dahl states that he had always wanted to write a ghost story but had never quite been able to. The closest he came was with "The Landlady", but after reading it through, he decided that he had not "brought it off", so changed the ending to make the twist non-supernatural.

== Reception ==
"The Landlady" won "Best Short Story Mystery" at the 1960 Edgar Awards. This was the second time Dahl was honoured, the first having been for his collection of short stories, Someone Like You (Best Short Story, 1954).

== Screen adaptation ==
In 1979, Siobhán McKenna appeared in the title role of The Landlady in an episode of the British TV series Tales of The Unexpected, where she played a seemingly charming and maternal, but eccentric, landlady who murders her male tenants and adds them to her collection of stuffed creatures.

== See also ==
- Roald Dahl short stories bibliography
- The Hotel at the End of the Road
