= Mrs. Bixby and the Colonel's Coat =

Short story by Roald Dahl

- Short story by Roald Dahl
- Country: United Kingdom
- Language: English

Publication
- Published in: Nugget
- Publication type: Magazine
- Publication date: 1959

"Mrs Bixby and the Colonel's Coat" is a short story by Roald Dahl that first appeared in a 1959 issue of Nugget. The story is Dahl's variation on a popular anecdote dating back at least to 1939: a married woman receives a glamorous mink coat from a man with whom she had an affair. She hopes to sneak the coat into her home without arousing her husband's suspicions, but soon discovers her husband has his own plans.

== Summary ==
Mrs Bixby and her dentist husband live in a New York apartment. Once a month, Mrs Bixby travels from New York City to Baltimore, supposedly visiting her elderly aunt; in fact, she is having an affair with the Colonel.

As she is preparing to leave after one of these visits to Baltimore, Mrs Bixby receives a package from the Colonel containing a letter and an expensive gift: a dark mink coat. The Colonel's letter informs Mrs Bixby they can no longer see each other, and suggests she tell her husband the mink coat is a Christmas present from her aunt. Mrs Bixby is in despair as she reads the letter: her aunt is far too poor to be given credit for the gift. However, Mrs Bixby is intent on keeping the coat and devises a plan. On her return to New York she visits a pawnbroker and pawns the coat for $50. The pawnbroker gives her a pawn ticket, which she declines to mark with any kind of name or description. The ticket guarantees her right to claim the coat at any time. She tells her husband she found the pawn ticket in the taxi. He decides it would be best if he redeemed the ticket, in spite of Mrs Bixby's objections.

The next day, Dr Bixby goes to the pawn shop to redeem the ticket and claim the item it stands for. Mrs Bixby is excited and rushes to her husband's office after he has collected it. She is horrified when he proudly holds up a small, mangy stole, and not her coat. He announces it is real mink and that she should consider it her Christmas present.

Mrs Bixby initially believes the pawnbroker has cheated her of her coat and intends to confront him. But as she leaves her husband's office, Dr Bixby's secretary, Miss Pulteney, walks proudly past her, wearing the mink coat. It is implied that Dr Bixby is having an affair with Miss Pulteney, gave her the coat, and purchased a cheap stole for his wife instead. As Mrs Bixby cannot demand the coat back without revealing her own affair, she is hoist with her own petard.

== Adaptations ==
Television

Year	TV show	Episode	Starring	Notes
1960	Alfred Hitchcock Presents	Season 6, Episode 1	Audrey Meadows	Directed by Alfred Hitchcock
1965	Thirty-Minute Theatre	Season 1, Episode 9	Shelley Winters	This episode is believed lost.
1979	Tales of the Unexpected	Season 1, Episode 2	Julie Harris	

Film

Dus Kahaniyaan (English: Ten stories), a 2007 Indian Hindi-language anthology film comprising ten short films by different directors, includes Matrimony by Sanjay Gupta which is based on this short story.
