= Tales of the Unexpected (TV series) =

British TV series (1979–1988)

- Title card
- Also known as: Roald Dahl's Tales of the Unexpected
- Based on: short stories by Roald Dahl & others
- Presented by: Roald Dahl
- Theme music composer: Ron Grainer
- Country of origin: United Kingdom
- Original language: English
- No. of series: 9
- No. of episodes: 112 (list of episodes)

Production
- Executive producer: John Woolf
- Producer: John Rosenberg
- Running time: 25 minutes
- Production company: Anglia Television

Original release
- Network: ITV
- Release: 24 March 1979 – 13 May 1988

Tales of the Unexpected (known as Roald Dahl's Tales of the Unexpected for the first two series) is a British television series that aired between 1979 and 1988. Each episode told a story, often with sinister and wryly comedic undertones, with an unexpected twist ending. Every episode of series one, 12 episodes of series two, two episodes of series three, two episodes of series four, and one episode of series nine were based on short stories by Roald Dahl collected in the books Tales of the Unexpected, Kiss Kiss, and Someone Like You.

The series was made by Anglia Television for ITV with interior scenes recorded at its Norwich studios, whilst location filming mainly occurred across East Anglia. The theme music for the series was written by composer Ron Grainer. The dancer in the opening titles was Karen Standley.

The series has been repeated on Granada Plus, ITV3 and Sky Arts.

== Format ==
The series originally adapted various stories from Roald Dahl's anthology books. The series attracted notable guest stars, including: Susan George, Richard Johnson, Nigel Havers, Siân Phillips, Charles Hallahan, Joseph Cotten, Janet Leigh, John Gielgud, John Mills, Wendy Hiller, Denholm Elliott, Joan Collins, Rod Taylor, Ian Holm, Brian Blessed, Siobhán McKenna, Brad Dourif, Michael Gambon, Derek Jacobi, Anna Neagle, Elaine Stritch, Andrew Ray, Harry H. Corbett, Zoë Wanamaker, Charles Dance, Michael Ontkean, Peter Sallis, Joss Ackland, Toyah Willcox and Timothy West.

Dahl introduced most of his own stories himself, giving short monologues explaining what inspired him to write them. Unlike other horror anthologies such as The Twilight Zone, Tales of the Unexpected features few supernatural, science fiction or fantasy elements, and usually takes place in entirely realistic settings (exceptions include the series one episode "William and Mary", the series two episode "Royal Jelly", and the series four episode "The Sound Machine").

Although many of Dahl's stories are left open to the reader's interpretation, the television series usually provided a generally accepted conclusion. This is exemplified in the story "The Landlady", the written version of which only hints at character Billy's fate, while the televised adaptation has a more resolved ending.

Later episodes were set in different locations outside the United Kingdom, with many being made in the United States.

== Later series ==
The second series featured four episodes from other writers. The title in those four episodes reflected this change when it became Tales of the Unexpected – Introduced by Roald Dahl. Dahl ceased providing introductions for some episodes during series three, and then stopped almost completely thereafter. The series three episode "Parson's Pleasure" was the final regular episode to feature an on-screen introduction by Dahl, although he did return to provide introductions to the series eight episodes "In the Cards" and "Nothing Short of Highway Robbery" and gave a brief voice-over introduction to the series four episode "Shatterproof" and narrated the seventh season episode "The Open Window". An in-studio introduction was also shot for "The Open Window", but this was excluded from the DVD release. It can be seen on a foreign dubbed version. third and fourth series featured two episodes apiece adapted from Dahl stories, and a fifth, titled "The Surgeon", featured in the ninth and final series in 1988.

== Way Out ==
Dahl had hosted a similar series for the American CBS network called Way Out in 1961. It was similar in concept and themes to The Twilight Zone, and ran for 14 episodes on Friday nights (as the lead-in for The Twilight Zone). It used some stories that would again be adapted for Tales of the Unexpected.

== Episodes ==
Series	Episodes	Originally released	
Series	Episodes	First released	Last released
1	9	24 March 1979	19 May 1979
2	16	1 March 1980	14 June 1980
3	9	9 August 1980	19 December 1980
4	17	5 April 1981	26 December 1981
5	18	25 April 1982	2 January 1983
6	14	9 April 1983	3 September 1983
7	15	12 May 1984	21 October 1984
8	4	30 March 1985	28 July 1985
9	10	18 December 1987	13 May 1988
