= John Dossett =

American actor & singer (born 1958)

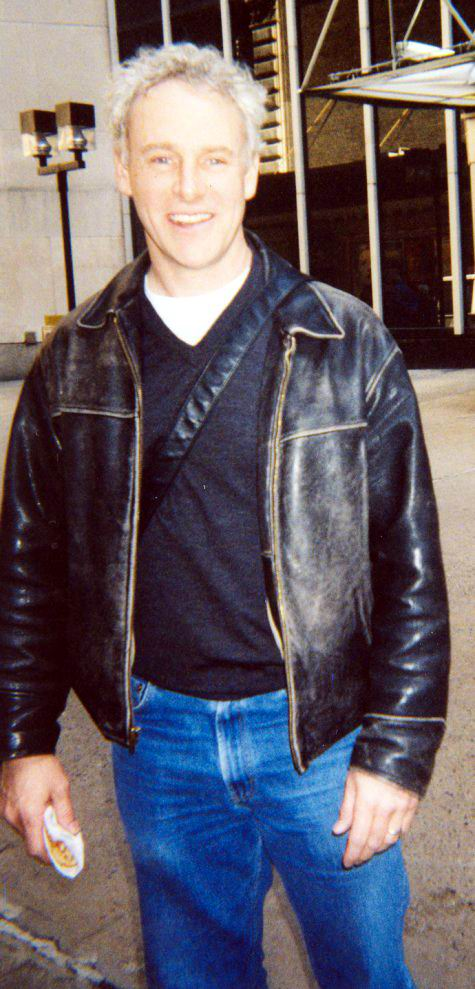
- Dossett in Shubert Alley, New York (2004)
- Born: John Edward Dossett; April 15, 1958 (age 68); Louisville, Kentucky
- Occupations: Actor, singer
- Years active: 1979–present
- Spouse: Michele Pawk (m. 2004)

John Dossett (born April 15, 1958) is an American actor and singer.

== Early life and education ==
Dossett attended Mount Pleasant High School in Wilmington, Delaware, from 1972 through 1976, where he was an announcer for the school's radio station, WMPH, and appeared in student theater productions.

== Career ==
Dossett made his Broadway debut in 1979 in a short-lived musical entitled the King of Schnorrers. In 1982 he joined the cast of Fifth of July, after which the bulk of his work was in off-Broadway productions and on television. He was a member of the off-Broadway Circle Repertory Company, performing in many plays between 1980 and 1994 and originating the role of Dewey Maples in The Diviners. A significant screen credit is the 1990 AIDS drama, Longtime Companion.

He later achieved success in two popular musicals, Ragtime (1998) and the 2003 revival of Gypsy as "Herbie" opposite Bernadette Peters. His performance in the latter garnered him both Tony Award and Drama Desk Award nominations as Outstanding Featured Actor in a Musical. He was reunited with his Gypsy co-star Peters in a one-night-only benefit reading of Love Letters in September 2007, for Opening Act.

In 2005, he took over the role of Sam Carmichael in Mamma Mia! Dossett appeared in the world premiere of the Michael John LaChiusa and Sybille Pearson musical Giant, as Bawley, at the Signature Theatre in Arlington, Virginia through May 31, 2009. He reprised his role at the Dallas Theater Center production of Giant, from January 18, 2012, through February 19.

He played the role of "Aaron" in the new musical First Wives Club, starting in July 2009 at the Old Globe, San Diego, California. In September 2009, Dossett returned to the Broadway musical Mamma Mia! in the role of Sam Carmichael opposite Tony Award winner Beth Leavel and later Lisa Brescia.

In September 2011, he played the role of Joseph Pulitzer in the premiere of the Disney stage musical Newsies at the Paper Mill Playhouse in Millburn, New Jersey. He had been cast as Frank Crawley in the Broadway production of Rebecca, but left that musical because he appeared in Newsies on Broadway as Joseph Pulitzer. Newsies opened on Broadway on March 15, 2012, in previews. He later joined the Broadway production of Chicago as Billy Flynn for an engagement lasting from March to May 2015.

He played the role of "Larry Murphy" in the Off-Broadway production of Dear Evan Hansen, which opened in previews on March 26, 2016, at the Second Stage Theatre, and closed on May 29, 2016. He appears as "Tommy Lewis" in the musical by Doug Wright (book), Scott Frankel (music) and Michael Korie (lyrics) titled War Paint. The musical, which stars Patti Lupone and Christine Ebersole, premiered at the Goodman Theatre, Chicago, on June 28, 2016. On March 7, 2023, he took over the role of the Wizard in the Broadway production of Wicked. Dossett played his final performance with the show on March 3, 2024.

== Personal life ==
Dossett married actress Michele Pawk on February 13, 2004. The couple met in 1994 while working together in an off-Broadway musical, Hello Again. They worked together in the musical Mamma Mia! in 2005 and also star alongside each other in Wicked beginning in March 2023. The couple resides in South Orange, New Jersey. They have a son, Jack, born in February 2000.

== Acting credits ==
=== Stage ===
Year	Title	Role	Director	Venue	Ref.
1979–1980	King of Schnorrers	David Ben Yonkel	Grover Dale	Playhouse Theatre (NY)	
1980	Innocent Thoughts, Harmless Intentions	Walter "Fishfoot" Fitzbout	B. Rodney Marriott	Circle Theatre	
1980	The Diviners	Dewey Maples	Tom Evans	Circle Theatre	
1981	Childe Byron	Boy	Marshall W. Mason	Circle Theatre	
1981–1982	Francis	Francis Bernadone	Frank Martin	Parish Hall at the Church of the Heavenly Rest	
1982	Richard II	Duke of Aumerle	Marshall W. Mason	Entermedia Theater	
1980–1982	Fifth of July	Jed Jenkins (replacement)	Marshall W. Mason	New Apollo Theatre (NY)	
1987	El Salvador	McCutcheon	John Bishop	Circle Repertory Theatre	
1988	Reckless	Lloyd	Norman René	Circle Repertory Theatre	
1989	Dalton's Back	Dalton Possil	Mark Ramont	Circle Repertory Theatre	
1989	Mastergate	John Shepherd	Michael Engler	Criterion Center Stage Right	
1989	Sunshine	Nelson	Marshall W. Mason	Circle Repertory Theatre	
1990–1991	Prelude to a Kiss	Taylor, Peter (understudy, replacement)	Norman René	Circle Repertory Theatre, Helen Hayes Theatre	
1992	Captains Courageous	Manuel	Graciela Daniele	Ford's Theatre	
1992	Empty Hearts	Detective Dave Ennis/Hank Sweetzer	John Bishop	Circle Repertory Theatre	
1993	Down the Road	Dan Henniman	David Dorwart	Linda Gross Theatre	
1993	Paper Moon	Brother Randolph Sass	Matt Casella	Paper Mill Playhouse	
1993–1994	Hello Again	The Senator	Graciela Daniele	Mitzi E. Newhouse Theater	
1994	Moonshots and Cosmos	Tom	Marshall W. Mason	Circle Repertory Theatre	
1995	Elmer Gantry	Elmer Gantry	Michael Maggio	Ford's Theatre	
1995	Kiss of the Spider Woman	Valentin	Harold Prince	National Theatre	
1996	Applause	Bill Sampson	Gene Saks	Paper Mill Playhouse	
1998	How I Learned to Drive	Uncle Peck	Maria Mileaf	Plays and Players Theatre	
1999	Dinner with Friends	Tom (replacement)	Daniel J. Sullivan	Variety Arts Theatre	
1999	Trudy Blue	Don/James	Michael Sexton	MCC Theater	
1999	The Visit		Frank Galati		
1999–2000	Ragtime	Father (replacement)	Frank Galati	Ford Center for the Performing Arts, Farnsworth Studio	
2000	Little Women	Professor Bhaer	Nick Corley	Randall L Wreghitt Productions Workshop	
2001	The Adventures of Tom Sawyer	Judge Thatcher	Scott Ellis	Minskoff Theatre	
2002	A Little Night Music	Fredrik Egerman	Mark Brokaw	Mann Center for the Performing Arts, Kennedy Center	
2002	An Almost Holy Picture	Samuel Gentle	Michael Mayer	American Airlines Theatre	
2002–2003	Dinner at Eight	Dr. J. Wayne Talbot	Gerald Gutierrez	Vivian Beaumont Theater	
2003–2004	Gypsy	Herbie	Sam Mendes	Shubert Theatre	
2004–2005	Democracy	Helmut Schmidt	Michael Blakemore	Brooks Atkinson Theatre	
2005	Children and Art		Richard Maltby Jr.	New Amsterdam Theatre	
2005	The Constant Wife	Bernard Kersal	Mark Brokaw	American Airlines Theatre	
2005–2006	Mamma Mia!	Sam Carmichael (replacement)	Phyllida Lloyd	Cadillac Winter Garden Theatre	
2006–2007	The Clean House	Matilde's Father/Charles	Bill Rauch	Mitzi E. Newhouse Theater	
2008	Saved	Pastor Skip	Gary Griffin	Playwrights Horizons	
2009	First Wives Club	Aaron	Francesca Zambello	Old Globe Theatre	
2009	White People		Gus Reyes	Atlantic Stage 2	
2009–2011	Mamma Mia!	Sam Carmichael (replacement)	Phyllida Lloyd	Winter Garden Theatre	
2011, 2012–2014	Newsies	Joseph Pulitzer	Jeff Calhoun	Paper Mill Playhouse, Nederlander Theatre	
2012	Giant	Uncle 'Bawley' Benedict	Michael Greif	Joseph Papp Public Theater, Dallas Theater Center	
2014–2015	Pippin	Charles (replacement)	Diane Paulus	Music Box Theatre	
2015	Chicago	Billy Flynn (replacement)	Walter Bobbie	Ambassador Theatre	
2016	Dear Evan Hansen	Larry Murphy	Michael Greif	Second Stage Theater	
2017	War Paint	Tommy Lewis	Michael Greif	Nederlander Theatre, Goodman Theatre	
2018	The Heart of Rock & Roll	Stone	Gordon Greenberg	Old Globe Theatre	
2018	Sylvia	Greg	Matt Lenz	The Cape Playhouse	
2018	Grand Hotel	Hermann Preysing	Tommy Tune	New York City Center	
2019	A Small Fire	John Bridges	Joanie Schultz	Suzanne Roberts Theatre	
2019	A Number	Salter	Eliza Baldi	People's Light and Theatre Company	
2021–2022	Paradise Square	Frederic Tiggens	Frank Galati	Nederlander Theatre, Barrymore Theatre	
2022	Parade	Judge Roan/Old Confederate Soldier	Michael Arden	New York City Center Encores!	
2023–2024	Wicked	The Wonderful Wizard of Oz (replacement)	Joe Mantello	Gershwin Theatre	
2024	The Heart of Rock and Roll	Stone	Gordon Greenberg	James Earl Jones Theatre	

=== Television ===
Year	Title	Role	Notes	Ref.
1994	Homicide: Life on the Street	Chick	Episode "The Last of the Watermen"	
1996	JAG	Commander Dennis Brockman	Episode "Ares"	
1997	Prince Street		2 episodes	
1999	Sex and the City	Don	Episode "Games People Play"	
2002	Hack	Jack Shannon	2 episodes	
1999, 2005	Law & Order: Special Victims Unit	Tom Dayton (1999), Dr. Trainer (2005)	2 episodes	
1993, 1999, 2002, 2005	Law & Order	Don Stuart (1993), Frank Wellington (1999), Father Evans (2002), Judge Martin Schnell (2005)	4 episodes	
2007	Law & Order: Criminal Intent	Judge Nicholas Fenner Sr.	Episode "Players"	
2007	Gossip Girl	Jack Roth	Episode "Roman Holiday"	
2008	John Adams	Benjamin Rush	6 episodes	
2010	As the World Turns	Joe Chessley	2 episodes	
2011	The Good Wife	Kyle Murphy	Episode "Breaking Up"	
2011	Lights Out	Dr. Wilson	Episode "Cut Men"	
2011	Blue Bloods	Father McMurray	Episode "Model Behavior"	
2011	Suits	Mr. Dockery	Episode "Pilots"	
2013	The Americans	Kurt Schultz	Episode "COMINT"	
2018	Instinct	Reilly	Episode "Flat Line"	
2018	Madam Secretary	General David Nelson	Episode "Night Watch"	
2018	Elementary	Treadwell	Episode "How to Get a Head"	

=== Film ===
Year	Title	Role	Director	Ref.
1989	Longtime Companion	Paul	Norman René	
1992	That Night	Larry Bloom	Craig Bolotin	
1997	Nick and Jane	John	Richard Mauro	
1997	Clover	Chase Porter	Jud Taylor	
1999	Blue Moon	John Barnard	Ron Lagomarsino	
1999	The Cracker Man	Hank	Rudy Gaines	
2000	Big Eden	John Bishop	Thomas Bezucha	
2005	Little Manhattan	Mickey Telesco	Mark Levin	
2011	The Oranges	Shelly	Julian Farino	
2012	Man on a Ledge	Ted Henry	Asger Leth	
2020	No Loss Here	Ted	Nathan Brewer	
