= Norman René =

American film director (1951–1996)

- Born: 1951; Bristol, Rhode Island, US
- Died: May 24, 1996 (aged 44–45); New York City, US
- Occupations: Film director, film producer, theatre director

Norman René (1951 – May 24, 1996) was an American theater and film director and film producer who frequently collaborated with playwright Craig Lucas.

== Biography ==
René was born in Bristol, Rhode Island. He studied psychology for a year at Johns Hopkins University before transferring to Carnegie Mellon University to pursue acting. While there, he realized he was better suited for directing, and during three summer breaks he ran the repertory Red Barn Theater in Pittsburgh.

After graduating in 1974, René moved to New York City. Three years later he teamed with three Carnegie Mellon alumni to found the off-off-Broadway Production Company, where he served as artistic director and directed and/or supervised productions such as The Guardsman and Blues in the Night. The company included Julie Hagerty, Judith Ivey, Treat Williams, Mark Linn-Baker, and John Glover.

René met Craig Lucas in 1979. Their first collaboration was Marry Me a Little in 1981. The two wrote a script incorporating songs that had been written for but discarded from Stephen Sondheim musicals, and René also directed. They followed this with the plays Missing Persons (1981) and Blue Window (1984); Three Postcards (1987), an original music by Lucas and Craig Carnelia; and another play, Reckless (1988).

In 1990, they joined forces for what would prove to be their biggest commercial and critical success, Prelude to a Kiss, for which René won the Obie Award for Best Director. Prelude later transferred to Broadway, where he had directed Precious Sons by George Furth in 1986.

René was nominated twice for the Drama Desk Award for Outstanding Director of a Play, for Reckless and Prelude.

René directed an episode of American Playhouse in 1987, and made his feature film directorial debut with Longtime Companion, scripted by Lucas, in 1990. For his work on that film, he won the Audience Award and was nominated for the Grand Jury Prize at the Sundance Film Festival, and was nominated for the Critics Award at the Deauville Film Festival. He co-produced and directed the 1992 screen adaptation of Prelude with Alec Baldwin and Meg Ryan and directed the 1995 film version of Reckless with Mia Farrow and Mary-Louise Parker.

Kevin McKenna was René's long-term boyfriend. René died of complications from AIDS in New York City.

== Filmography ==
=== Film ===
Year	Title	Director	Writer	Producer	Notes
1987	American Playhouse	Yes	No	No	
1989	Longtime Companion	Yes	No	No	
1992	Prelude to a Kiss	Yes	No	No	
1995	Reckless	Yes	No	No	
