= Sydney Walker =

American actor (1921–1994)

- Born: May 5, 1921; Philadelphia, Pennsylvania, U.S.
- Died: September 30, 1994 (aged 73); San Francisco, California, U.S.
- Occupations: Actor; singer
- Years active: 1936–1994

Sydney Walker (May 5, 1921 – September 30, 1994) was an American character actor of stage and screen and voice artist, with a career that spanned over five decades.

== Early life ==
Born in Philadelphia, Pennsylvania, Walker developed an interest in drama from attending films as a child. He was especially enamored of death scenes, sometimes enacting them to entertain others. When he was 15, he began acting in small theater productions. He gained more experience through an apprenticeship with the Hedgerow Theatre in Pennsylvania. He left there to serve in World War II and then returned. He developed his skills further by studying at the Conservatory of Music and Dramatic Art in Paris, focusing on pantomime and singing.

== Career ==
Walker was primarily a stage actor. After he studied in Paris, he performed at the Pasadena Playhouse and La Jolla Playhouse. His professional debut was in 1960 and he featured in twenty-eight Broadway plays between 1961 and 1973. In 1967, he was nominated for a Tony Award as "Best Featured Actor in a Play" for his performance in The Wild Duck.

Between 1966 and 1969, Walker was a principal member of Ellis Rabb’s APA–Phoenix Repertory Company in New York City, working alongside Rosemary Harris, Donald Moffat, Keene Curtis, Paul Sparer, and Nancy Marchand, all of whom later achieved notable careers in film, television, and theatre.

As a character actor in motion pictures, he appeared as Dr. Shapeley in the 1970 blockbuster film Love Story, and also appeared in The Way We Live Now and Puzzle of a Downfall Child the same year. His most prominent film role came in the 1992 movie Prelude to a Kiss, in which he was featured as a dying elderly man who switches bodies with a newlywed portrayed by Meg Ryan. He had a small role in the 1993 hit Mrs. Doubtfire as the bus driver who finds a small attraction to Mrs. Doubtfire, and played Mr. Wankmueller in the 1994 Macaulay Culkin and Ted Danson comedy Getting Even with Dad. He also acted in the television soap opera The Guiding Light for the 1970–71 season. He also provided the voice for the children's toy "Grampa Time" (a toy that had a nightlight and told bedtime stories).

His many television appearances included The Phil Silvers Show. For a good part of his career (late 1970s through the 1980s), Walker was a teacher and principal actor at the Geary Theatre in San Francisco. He taught acting at the American Conservatory Theater (A.C.T.) there. He also immortalized roles such as Scrooge in A Christmas Carol, Lord Porteus in Somerset Maugham's The Circle, and Ash in The National Health by Peter Nichols, among many others.

== Death ==
On September 30, 1994, Walker died of cancer in San Francisco, California. He never married.

== Filmography ==
Year	Title	Role	Notes
1968	A Lovely Way to Die		
1970	The Way We Live Now	Lincoln	
1970	Puzzle of a Downfall Child	Psychiatrist	
1970	Love Story	Dr. Shapeley	
1990	Best Shots	Uncle Jack	
1992	Prelude to a Kiss	Julius Blier	
1993	Mrs. Doubtfire	Bus Driver	
1994	Getting Even with Dad	Mr. Wankmueller	(final film role)
