= The Diviners (play) =

American play set during the Great Depression

- Promotional poster of the show's off-Broadway premiere
- Original language: English
- Written by: Jim Leonard, Jr.
- Genre: Dramedy
- Setting: Zion, Indiana. 1930s

Premiere
- Date: October 16, 1980
- Place: Circle Repertory Company

The Diviners is a play by Jim Leonard, Jr., about a backsliding pastor who befriends a mentally stunted 14-year-old boy with an intense fear of water.

The play was originally developed with assistance from the American College Theatre Festival and originally performed by the Hanover College Theatre Group, where it was awarded the "Best Play" award. The play premiered at the Circle Repertory Company on October 16, 1980.

The show is set in the small, mythical town of Zion, Indiana in the early 1930s, and the story follows the bond between mentally challenged and severely aquaphobic Buddy Layman and disenchanted preacher C.C. Showers, who struggles to relieve himself of his family heritage. The narrative centers on themes of religion, community, family, and loss, all seen through a collective push for a rebuilt church and in the ways that Buddy expresses his grief for his late mother, especially when translated spiritually.

== Plot ==
=== First elegy ===
The first elegy, told by Basil Bennett, a farmer and local doctor, and Dewey Maples, his farmhand, detail their accounts of what happened before and after the death of "idiot-boy" Buddy Layman. Basil describes the intense storm that came just a few hours before, whereas Dewey explains his franticness of reaching Buddy's father, Ferris, after the boy's death. Both accounts provide a symbol of change within the community. The audience is ushered into the story as Basil describes Buddy's uncanny "touch and feel for water".

=== Act I - "The Earth and the Water" ===
Immediately after the elegy, the audience is introduced to Buddy as he searches (divines) for water for a well on Basil's farm. Luella, Basil's wife, refuses to believe that the boy can find water, but is disproven after Basil's farmhands, Melvin Wilder and Dewey Maples, find a vein in the precise area that Buddy directed them to. He explains that he finds water by feeling his mother's presence. Once the farmers leave, Buddy is set to sweeping the porch under the watch of his older sister, Jennie Mae.

Shortly after, Buddy sweeps into C.C. Showers—a stranger passing through Zion in search of food and work. After a moment of skepticism—and a brief scare on Buddy's end—Jennie Mae goes to fetch Ferris Layman, her and Buddy's father, to discuss employment. It is during the in-between conversation with Showers and Buddy that the audience learns of Buddy's late mother and lack of understanding of death.

Ferris, a mechanic, discusses with Showers, and Buddy is sent to walk around town with Showers' suitcases to keep him entertained and give the two privacy. Ferris compares children to weeds, saying that they're fine to do whatever they please without surveillance or concern for safety, much unlike cars, which he goes on to rave about. Showers withholds knowledge of his previous occupation from Ferris once it is figured out that he has no knowledge of cars whatsoever, and only reveals that he used to be a preacher in a moment of desperation. Ferris initially takes this as a joke, and immediately after, Buddy and Jennie Mae come back with Showers' now-empty suitcases. This causes a scene—Ferris blames Jennie Mae for Buddy's actions, saying she should have been watching her brother, to which she complains that she has no time for herself due to having to "parent" Buddy all the time. As C.C. is about to leave (now that his hopes for a completely fresh start are askew), Buddy stops him, which prompts Ferris to offer him a job and a place to stay. From this point on, C.C. works as a mechanic in Ferris' garage and quickly becomes very close friends with Buddy, as the two are able to connect to each other in ways that others do not.

The owner of the town's Dry-Goods store, Norma Henshaw, quickly learns of the new "preacher" in town and sets herself on bringing a Christian revival to the community, much needed since the burning down of the church. Luella warns against immediate trust in Showers and continuously questions his credibility, to which Norma responds with telling her to stop being doubtful of his arrival, reiterating that "the Lord knows how the town needs a preacher!"

Shortly after, Ferris, C.C., and Buddy are greeted by Goldie Short, the owner of the Dine-Away Cafe. Goldie, aware of Showers' past and hopeful of his potential to reawaken Christianity in Zion, continuously talks up what the church used to be despite Ferris' interjections, as well as enthusiastically giving the preacher "special treatment" and pushing him to say grace before eating. Upon finding out about his intentions to quit, she sourly retracts her facade. When Buddy complains about the itching on his feet, she asserts that "fever weed, salts, and a hot tub a water" would fix his indisposition, and overtly says that it's something she's tried to tell Ferris for years. At this, he picks a fight, which only upsets her more, causing her to end the argument with stating that the way he's parented Buddy isn't right for him, and implying the disapproval of his late wife. Soon after, Basil and Dewey discuss Sara's, Ferris wife's, drowning, which occurred to save a 3-year-old Buddy from suffering the same fate. The amount of time that the boy spent underwater is revealed to be the reason for his childishness and incompetence, as well as his aversion to water and bathing.

After Buddy runs after a bird whilst on a stroll with Jennie Mae and C.C., Jennie Mae inquires as to why Showers left the church in his hometown of Hazard, Kentucky. This leads to a long-winded explanation and monologue of his family practice—Showers comes from a long line of Kentucky preacher-men, and when the son of the family comes of age, he is sent off to live on his own and pass down the tradition. He feels as though he pales in comparison to those who came before him, his father in particular, because of his habits of becoming lost in thought mid-sermon, as well as his lack of passion and overwhelming stress. He and Jennie Mae briefly sweet-talk before seeing a storm on the horizon, and rush home to find Buddy, who is in a fit of panic because of the downpour. Ferris and Jennie Mae manage to calm him down enough to fall asleep, while Showers looks on in bewilderment.

Soon after, Buddy wakes up due to the overwhelming itching on his feet, which wakes up the others in turn. After Ferris manages to get the boy to comply in trying to go back to sleep, he discusses his youth with Showers, particularly his relationship with Sara. When Buddy wakes up and once again complains about his ailment, Showers suggests taking up on Goldie's suggestion—a solution of healing salts and warm water to wash the boy's feet—before Ferris grows irritated, saying that his son won't get anywhere near water and asserting that "you can try all day long but you ain't gonna change him!"

When Buddy continues to refuse to sleep, he and C.C. go for a stroll, where they are greeted by Darlene Henshaw, Norma's rebellious and kittenish niece, who has snuck out to take a gander at the preacher sitting on the porch. After Jennie Mae declines an offer to see who her friend is courting in favor of going back to bed, Darlene is met by Dewey—a farmhand and her rather awkward suitor—and his coworker and wingman, Melvin Wilder. Melvin overcompensates and gets rather defensive when Dewey's statements come into question, which seems to succeed in securing both Darlene and Dewey a date to the upcoming dance.

When C.C. and Buddy head down to the Dry-Goods store to purchase healing salts to wash the boy, Buddy is immediately enticed by the jar of jellybeans that Norma carries in, and insists on having them for himself. Norma explains that in order to take the jar home, he must guess how many jellybeans are inside, and makes a point to emphasize the difficulty of the activity. When Showers and Buddy guess the correct number without any consultation amongst themselves, Norma realizes that Showers is the preacher she's been raving about, and begins charging on about her gratitude for his arrival and his potential to "heal the boy. C.C. quickly sees his way out alongside Buddy, while Norma tells herself, Luella, and Goldie that the jar of beans are a sign from God. Upon Goldie's attempts to tell her friend that Showers has given up preaching, Norma asserts that "you can't toss off the Spirit like you toss off a coat!", refusing to give up hope that he'll bring religion back to the town.

That evening, C.C. and Jennie Mae make it a point to wash Buddy's feet. When he asks what the bucket that Jennie Mae carries in contains, he quickly figures that it's water, and begins to throw a fit. He only becomes less skeptical when C.C. comes up with the alias of "itch-juice"—a substance that "takes the itchin right outta your feet." When the two convince him to step inside the bucket of warm water and salt, Showers tells the boy that he'll calm down if he sings, and that his itching will be gone by the time he's finished. The act ends with the three singing "You Are My Sunshine" as the boy is bathed for the first time in years.

=== Act II - "The Sky and the Water" ===
Act II opens with Buddy catching a baby bird who has fallen out of its nest, then putting him "back to his Mama" with the assistance of Showers. He talks about how he would prefer to live as a bird, which the preacher indulges, as he and the boy emulate flying together. Buddy then goes on to talk about his mother, and how he'd like to find and join her in "flying", which causes Showers to attempt to ground him, talking about all the people who need him—himself included.

Later in the day, the Layman siblings and Darlene dig for bait, as Showers has asked Jennie Mae to accompany him to go fishing. Darlene refuses to touch the worms, explaining that she's freaked out by them because, according to the Bible (the book of Genesis, verses 3:00-19 in specific), worms and snakes used to be able to speak and walk. When Jennie Mae takes her words as jest, Darlene goes on about the Bible—which she has somewhat misinterpreted—in a vague manner. When she describes the story of Noah's Ark, simply saying that God once flooded the whole earth and "makes it keep raining", Buddy is set into a fit of panic, believing that he has done something wrong. This later turns into a belief that God doesn't just make it rain because of his anger at Buddy, but also that He has taken his mother from him for the same reason.

As Showers calms the boy down, Norma walks in to drop off the left-behind jar of jellybeans, and mistakes the two for praying. She begins to excitedly ramble about his "bringing the boy to the Lord" and how he can quit at the garage in favor of preaching again. Despite his attempts to explain her faults, she refuses to listen, angering him and creating a secondary conflict.

Eventually, Basil comes by the garage to pick up his newly repaired bike. As Ferris reattaches a stray tire, Buddy rubs grease on himself, and as Basil takes a look at his ringworm, he gets annoyed at Ferris for not following his instruction to wash him with cold water—something he's tried to explain the entire summer. Showers grows irritated that Ferris hid information that could help Buddy, which Ferris tries to justify with how he feels when his son is around water and the trauma he has from watching his wife drown. The argument ends with the decision to wash him a second time. This attempt greatly fails, as Ferris ends up letting Buddy run free out of distress, causing him to get caught in a terrible storm. Showers takes it upon himself to find Buddy, who believes that he is suffocating. He "teaches" him to breathe in rain, slightly ridding him of his fear and allowing him to briefly enjoy himself. When Jennie Mae comes after them, Showers tells her to tell her father that he and the boy will be down to the river. However, she runs into Norma—who has caught Darlene sneaking out to dance with Dewey, condemning her "sinful" behavior—and tells her of the events regarding the preacher and the boy, telling her to inform Ferris if she finds him. Norma takes this as a baptizism, and sends Dewey off to find Ferris.

When Showers and Buddy arrive at the river, Buddy is convinced to wade in the shallow of the river to acclimate himself. When he hears singing coming from the townspeople who have come for the "baptism", he mistakes it for the river talking to him, and Showers turns his attention away from him to rage about their gross misinterpretation of what is happening. Buddy, believing that he can breathe in water, steps into the deep end of the river and is pulled under by the current. Showers is only made aware of this after hearing Jennie Mae's cries for her brother, and although he tries to save him, he fails, and the boy drowns.

=== Second Elegy ===
The second elegy very closely mirrors the first one, this time detailing Buddy's legacy in the town, describing the harvest as "[turning] the earth to the earth like a child to his mother."

== Character Synopses ==
- Buddy Layman: An "idiot-boy" who has the mysterious ability to "feel" water, yet suffers from an intense phobia of it. This is due to a drowning accident where he lost his mother, and fears water and the rain because of it.
- C.C. Showers: A backsliding preacher facing a crisis of purpose who befriends the boy. He is considered attractive by the women of Zion, and has constant battles with the townspeople (namely Norma Henshaw) over reinstating religion himself.
- Ferris Layman: Buddy's father and Zion's local mechanic. He is stubborn and hesitant to do anything that might distress his son, even if it is for his own good. He is implied to be negligent to an extent, leaving Jennie Mae to watch her brother most of the time, and letting Buddy run free without much concern.
- Jennie Mae Layman: Buddy's patient and caring sister, who fills the maternal role of her family and is conflicted with having to grow up too soon as a result. She is attracted to Showers throughout the course of the play, which is quickly shut down due to major age differences.
- Basil Bennett: A farmer and amateur doctor who relies on Buddy's abilities.
- Luella Bennett: Basil's wife and a skeptic. She is doubtful of anything she knows nothing about, namely Buddy's affinity and initially Showers' arrival in Zion.
- Norma Henshaw: The owner of the Dry Goods Store. She is deeply religious and optimistic of the reinstatement of Christianity and the rebuilding of the Church, taking Showers' arrival as a sign from God.
- Goldie Short: The owner of the Dine-Away Cafe. She is equally as optimistic about C.C.'s arrival, in the sense that the rebuilding of the church will bring in business on Sundays.
- Darlene Henshaw: Norma's niece. Imaginative and charismatic, yet "rebellious" under her aunt's standards, which she manages to sneak past her most of the time. She is a protagonist in the side plot of the show, where she sneaks off to attend a dance with Dewey despite her aunt's rules.
- Melvin Wilder: Basil's farmhand. He takes himself as a bit of a know-it-all as he attended boot camp twice, and takes Dewey under his wing in romancing Darlene.
- Dewey Maples: Another farmhand. He is the youngest between him and Melvin, and is more sheepish and clumsy.

== Company and Casts ==
In order of appearance and performance.

Cast
Character	American College Theatre Festival	Off-Broadway Premiere
Basil Bennett	Mark Fearnow	Jack Davidson
Dewey Maples	Clint Allen	John Dossett
Buddy Layman	John Geter	Robert MacNaughton / John Geter
Melvin Wilder	Mark Bock	Ben Siegler
Luella Bennett	Shannon Robinson	Elizabeth Sturges
Jennie Mae Layman	Dee Meyers	Lisa Pelikan / Karen Sederholm
C.C. Showers	Doug Rogers	Timothy Shelton
Ferris Layman	Keith White	Jimmy Ray Weeks
Norma Henshaw	Susan Leis	Jaqueline Brookes / Bobo Lewis
Goldie Short	Liz Hans	Mollie Collison
Darlene Henshaw	Valerie Sherwood	Laura Hughes

Tech Crew
Crew	Head - American College Theatre Festival	Head - Off-Broadway Premiere
Set design	Tom Evans	John Lee Beatty
Lighting	Tracy Dedrickson	Areden Fingerhut
Costumes	Katy Matson	Jennifer von Mayrhauser
Stage Manager	Robert Padgett	James M. Arnemann

== Production history ==
Venue	Location	Date	Direction
American College Theatre Festival	Washington, DC	1980	
Circle Repertory Theatre	New York City, New York	Oct 1980	Tom Evans
New Playwrights' Theatre	Washington, DC	1981	
Fairfield University Theatre	Fairfield, CT	Feb 1982	Tom Zingarelli
Mountain Avenue Theatre	Ashland, OR	2017	

== Soundtrack ==
Religious music is incorporated in the script, oftentimes as background music.

- "Amazing Grace" – used during the elegies, played on a dulcimer
- "Rock of Ages" – sung by Norma after Showers' arrival
- "You Are My Sunshine" – sung by Buddy, Jennie Mae, and Showers during the boy’s foot washing at the end of act I
- "Leaning on the Everlasting Arms" – sung by Norma after mistaking Showers and Buddy for praying
- "Shall We Gather at the River?" – sung during Buddy's "baptism" and drowning
