= Guiding Light (1970–1979) =

Television soap opera

The Guiding Light (TGL) (known since 1975 as Guiding Light) is a long-running American television soap opera.

== Show development ==
Writers Robert Soderberg and Edith Sommer wrote the show for several years until the spring of 1973. Then James Gentile, Robert Cenedella, and James Lipton continued until near the end of October 1975.

Under Soderberg and Sommer's leadership, several storylines concluded, including the gaslighting of Dr. Sara McIntyre by her first husband, Lee Gantry, and his housekeeper Miss Mildred Foss. The killing of Stanley Norris was also set up, and the mystery lasted for several months until the last-minute confession by another woman, who died in court. Another focus was the villainesses Katherine "Kit" Vested and Charlotte Waring Bauer.

The character of Roger Thorpe was introduced, played by Michael Zaslow, and became a fan favorite. His on-and-off again romance with Holly Norris Bauer Thorpe, Stanley Norris' daughter, created by Soderberg and Sommer, became one of the most popular and riveting romances on television.

Longtime cast member Theo Goetz, who played Papa Bauer on The Guiding Light, died on December 29, 1972 at the age of 78. Soderberg and Sommer wrote a tribute episode that aired on February 27, 1973, after Papa Bauer's death was incorporated into the show. The episode featured a memorial service where Dr. Ed Bauer gave a eulogy and Mike Bauer sang one of Papa's favorite songs.

Under Soderberg and Sommer, the romantic triangle between the Bauer sons, Mike and Ed, and Leslie Jackson Bauer Norris heated up, with Bert finding out about the romance during Leslie's trial for supposedly murdering Stanley Norris. This storyline was criticized by Charita Bauer, who played Bert, for not focusing on the show's main theme of family support.

In 1975, Procter & Gamble hired head writers Bridget and Jerome Dobson to compete with newer, more youth-oriented serials. The Dobsons took over from Gentile, Cenedella and Lipton, and focused on core characters, giving Bert her first real storyline in years when her husband Bill returned from the dead. They also created two families that remained prominent in storylines until the show's end in September 2009, the Spauldings and the Marlers. The Dobsons introduced characters like Alan Spaulding in November 1977, and Ross Marler in March 1979. Under the Dobsons, the longest-running recurring character, Cedars Hospital's OB-GYN Dr. Margaret Sedwick, first appeared in September 1979, helping many women through pregnancies and miscarriages over the years and playing a significant role in Lillian Raines' breast cancer diagnosis and recovery. Dr. Sedwick last appeared a few months before the show ended in 2009.

The Dobsons are credited with presenting the first-ever marital rape storyline on daytime television when Roger Thorpe raped his wife Holly Norris Bauer Thorpe in the March 5, 1979 episode of Guiding Light. This storyline was controversial and thought-provoking, leading to a major trial where attorney Ross Marler defended Roger, followed by Holly shooting him three times in the chest in June 1979. Roger was declared dead and Holly spent six months in prison for his murder until his body was exhumed, proving it wasn't his. The rape scene was considered one of the most realistic-looking in daytime history, in contrast to a previous rape scene involving Roger and Rita Stapleton that was criticized for romanticizing violence.

The Dobsons received criticism for killing off Leslie Jackson Bauer Norris Bauer in June 1976. Similarly, the decision to bring back Bill Bauer from the "dead" in the fall of 1977 was met with backlash from long-time viewers who remembered his supposed death in 1969. Although the character made brief appearances in the storyline, he was ultimately killed off in August 1983.

In early 1974, the show's theme and background music was changed from acoustic organ-based to orchestra-based. The opening and closing themes, "La Lumière," were re-scored in an orchestral version by composer Charles Paul and the billboards and titles were also updated.

On November 5, 1975, The Guiding Light changed its name to Guiding Light in an effort to modernize and also adopted a new theme song, "Ritournelle," by Charles Paul, with a visual of sunlight filtering through leaves on a tree. The show expanded to an hour-long format on November 7, 1977. The show embarked on several remote location shoots in the late 1970s, with filming in Nassau, Bahamas and Santo Domingo in June and July to September 1978.

The band Television paid tribute to the show by including a song entitled "Guiding Light" on their debut album Marquee Moon in 1977.

== Major characters ==
=== The Bauers ===
- Papa Bauer (Theo Goetz) until December 29, 1972.
- Meta Bauer Banning (Ellen Demming), written out on November 22, 1974.
- Bert Bauer (Charita Bauer until end of decade)
- Mike Bauer (Don Stewart until end of decade)
- Dr. Ed Bauer (Mart Hulswit until end of decade)
- Bill Bauer AKA Bill Morey (Ed Bryce, August 19, 1977, to May 31, 1978, November 1978), character brought back from the dead, came back briefly for Ed and Rita's wedding.
- Dr. Bruce Banning (Sydney Walker, March 1970 to December 1971; William Roerick, January to November 1974), written out.
- Hope Bauer (Elissa Leeds, until December 31, 1973; Tisch Raye, September 1975 to May 21, 1976; Robin Mattson, May 24, 1976, to January 14, 1977; Katherine Justice, January 19, 1977, to April 22, 1977, and November 1978; Elvera Roussel, March 19, 1979 until end of decade), SORASed daughter of Mike and Julie Bauer.
- Frederick "Freddie" Bauer (Albert Zungalo III, August 18, 1970, to December 1971; Gary Hannoch, January 1972 to August 1976; Robbie Berridge, August 1976 to August 1978), son of Ed and Leslie Bauer.
- Hillary Bauer (Linda McCullough, May 23, 1977, to February 24, 1978; Marsha Clark, March 2, 1978, until end of decade), Bill Bauer and Simone Kincaid's daughter.
- Paul Kincaid, Victor and Simone Kincaid's son only child. Mentioned to be in Europe but never seen.
- Trudy Bauer and husband Clyde Palmer (died 1974), mentioned, never seen.
- Leslie Jackson Bauer Norris Bauer (Lynne Adams until March 9, 1971, and then again from September 3, 1973, to June 7, 1976; Kathryn Hays, temporary replacement, March 10 to May 4, 1971; Barbara Rodell, May 5, 1971, to August 1973), Ed's first wife, Mike's third wife, Freddie's mother, character killed off.
- Charlotte Waring Bauer (Dorrie Kavanaugh, temporary replacement, January 2 to 16, 1970, July to October 1972; Victoria Wyndham, January 19, 1970, to June 1971; Melinda Fee, July 1971 to July 1972, October 1972 to September 1973), Mike's second wife, character killed by Kit Vestid.
- Dr. Stephen Jackson (Stefan Schnabel until end of decade)
- Victoria Ballenger (Carol Teitel, December 1973 to November 1974), Leslie's mother, character written out.
- Roy Mills (Josef Sommer, January to November 1974), Leslie Jacksons biological father from a long ago affair with Victoria Ballenger. Left town divorced from wife Audrey after Leslie's real parentage was disclosed.
- Audrey Frost Mills (Louise Troy, January to November 1974), sister of Dr. Wilson Frost, left town in 1974 after divorcing husband Roy Mills over his long ago affair with Victoria Ballenger that produced his daughter Leslie Jackson.
- Elsie Miller Franklin (Ethel Remey (radio and television, 1956; television only, 1957). Bert and Alma-Jean Millers mother. Died off-camera in 1977 in Arizona.
- Alma-Jean Miller, talked about but never seen. Phoned Bert about their mother Elsie's death. Attended with sister Bert their mother's funeral in Arizona in 1977.

=== The Norrises/Masons/Thorpes ===
- Stanley Norris (Michael Higgins until August 14, 1970; William Smithers, September 14, 1970, to November 1971), character killed by Marion Conway.
- Barbara Norris Thorpe (Augusta Dabney, January 2, 1970, to December 28, 1970; Barbara Berjer, January 25, 1971, until end of decade), Stanley's first wife, later married Adam Thorpe.
- Kenneth "Ken" Norris (Roger Newman, April 20, 1970, to October 30, 1972, February 26, 1973, to April 25, 1975), Stanley and Barbara's oldest son. In 1971 and 1972 he was the Assistant District Attorney of Springfield, written out.
- Andrew "Andy" Norris (Bernard "Barney" Joseph McFadden, June 1975 to December 1975), son of Stanley and Barbara Norris, written out.
- Holly Margaret Norris Bauer Thorpe (Lynn Deerfield, August 1970 to August 20, 1976; Maureen Garrett, October 4, 1976, until end of decade), Stanley and Barbara Norris' daughter, Ed's second wife, Roger's second wife.
- Janet Mason Norris (Caroline McWilliams until June 24, 1975), Ken's wife, written out.
- Emily Norris, Ken and Janet's daughter, written out.
- Grove Mason (Vince O'Brien, 1970), Janet's father, died on-screen.
- Ellen Mason (Jeanne Arnold, 1970–1973), Janet's mother, written out.
- Roger Adam Thorpe (Michael Zaslow, April 1, 1971, to January 1973, April 1974 until end of decade), Holly's second husband
- Adam Thorpe (Robert Gerringer, 1972; Robert Milli, May 1972 until end of decade), Roger's father, Barbara's second husband.
- Marjorie Thorpe, character talked about but not seen, Roger's mother, Adam's first wife, deceased.
- Christina "Chrissy" Thorpe (originally named Christina Bauer) (Gina Foy, July 9, 1975, to May 1978; Cheryl Lynn Brown), January 1979 until end of decade), Roger and Holly's daughter, originally thought to be Ed's daughter.
- Peggy Scott Fletcher Thorpe (Fran Myers, until September 1977; recurring October 1977 – November 1979), Roger's first wife, written out.

=== The Stapletons/McFarrens ===
- Rita Stapleton Bauer (Lenore Kasdorf, October 1975 until end of decade), Ed's third wife.
- Eve Stapleton McFarren (Janet Grey, May 1976 until end of decade), Rita's younger sister.
- Viola Stapleton (Sudie Bond, February to October 1976 (recurring); Kate Wilkinson, November 1976 until end of decade), Rita and Eve's mother.
- Benjamin "Ben" McFarren (Stephen Yates, February 1976 until end of decade), Eve's husband.
- Jerry McFarren (Peter Jensen, June to December 1975; Mark W. Travis, January 1976 to February 1977 and then again in November 1978), Ben's younger brother, character written out.

=== The Marlers ===
- Dr. Justin Marler (Tom O'Rourke, May 1976 until end of decade), Phillip Spaulding's biological father.
- Elizabeth Spaulding Marler (Lezlie Dalton, November 7, 1977, until end of decade), Alan's first wife, Justin's second wife, thought to be the biological mother of Phillip, but back in 1969 Alan bought Phillip in a deal with Dr. Paul LaCrosse to replace Elizabeth's stillborn child, Elizabeth had an affair with Mike Bauer both before and during her marriage to Justin that Jackie found out about when she found the two of them together in a hotel room in Aspen, Colorado in December 1979.
- Ross James Marler (Jerry verDorn, March 23, 1979, until end of decade), Justin's younger brother.
- Elaine "Lainie" Marler (Kathleen Kellaigh, May 1979 until end of decade), Justin and Ross' younger sister.

=== The Spauldings/Scotts ===
- Alan Spaulding (Chris Bernau, November 7, 1977, until end of decade). He would buy the Spaulding's summer home located in Springfield that would later evolve, in story line, into the Spaulding Mansion.
- Jacqueline "Jackie" Scott Marler Spaulding (Cindy Pickett, December 1976 until end of decade), in this decade: Dr. Justin Marler's first wife, Alan's second wife (and her second marriage), the biological mother of Phillip and she had a romantic relationship with Mike Bauer.
- Dr. Emmet Scott (Kenneth Harvey, January to April 2, 1977; Frank Latimore, April 5, 1977, to December 28, 1979), Jackie's father and Phillip's maternal biological grandfather, also Dr. Justin Marler's mentor.
- Phillip Granville Spaulding (Jarrod Ross, November 7, 1977, until end of decade), Alan bought Phillip from Dr. Paul La Crosse to replace Elizabeth's child that was stillborn.
- Brandon Spaulding (David Thomas, March to November 1979), Alan's father with Penelope, supposedly killed by Lucille Wexler in November 1979 in a nursing home outside of Springfield, presumed deceased.
- Herbert Spaulding. Mentioned in 1979 but not seen, believed to be deceased. Brandon Spaulding's first cousin. Later referenced, but not by name again in 2007, when Alan and Natalia discussed Rafe (Natalia and Gus's son) being diabetic.

=== Other characters ===
- Dr. Paul Fletcher (Bernard Grant until April 1970), written out.
- Dr. Johnny Fletcher (Erik Howell until 1973), Paul's son and Peggy's second husband, written out.
- Dr. Joe Werner (Ed Zimmerman until June 30, 1972; Berkeley Harris, temporary replacement, July 1972; Anthony Call, July 1972 to November 5, 1976), character killed off off-screen in India via a heart attack, Sara's second husband.
- Dr. Sara McIntyre (Millette Alexander until end of decade), married Lee Gantry, Joe Werner (his first wife) and Dean Blackford.
- Nurse Marion McHenry (Marion June Lauer Beniades, until 1972), ceased appearing.
- Lee Gantry (Ray Fulmer until August 1970), Sara's first husband who with Miss Mildred Foss tried to gaslight and then kill Sara, character killed off.
- Miss Mildred Foss (Jan Sterling Douglas until January 1970), character killed off.
- Peter Wexler (Michael Durrell until May 1972), won an election in 1970 to be District Attorney of Springfield and left Mike Bauer's firm and was the District Attorney who prosecuted Leslie Jackson Bauer Norris for the murder of her husband Stanley, written out.
- Gilbert "Gil" Mehren (David Pendleton until January 1972; James A. Preston, January to December 1972), ceased appearing.
- Deborah Herbert Mehren (Olivia Cole until 1973), Gil's wife and Janet Mason's best friend, Dr. Sara McIntyre and Dr. Joe Werner's secretary at Cedars, ceased appearing.
- Tyler Meade (Paul Collins until August 1970), written out.
- Katherine "Kit" Vestid (Nancy Addison Altman until April 25, 1974), originally the second wife of Stanley Norris until she divorced him, a Cedars Hospital volunteer, murdered Charlotte Waring Bauer via poisoning her coffee and tried to kill Dr. Sara McIntyre the same way, was killed when she struggled with Dr. Joe Werner for control of a gun, character killed off.
- Dusty McGuire (James Donnelly, until December 31, 1970), written out.
- Linell Conway (Christina Pickles, January 1970 to May 1972), Stanley Norris' secretary, accused of his murder, before her mother Marion would later confess to the murder during the trial, written out.
- Christie Rogers (Ariana Munker, 1970 to July 1971), Hope Bauer's best friend, written out.
- Dinah Buckley (Courtney Simon, 1970 to 1971), nurse at Cedars, dated Ed between his marriage to Leslie and his relationship with Holly, ceased appearing.
- David Vestid (Peter D. Greene, 1970 to 1971; Dan Hamilton, 1971 to 1972), Kit Vestid's brother, employee of Stanley Norris', written out.
- William "Billy" Bauer Dillman Fletcher (James Long, 1970 to 1973; Matthew Slossberg, 1973; Shane Nickerson, 1973 to 1976; Dai Stockton, 1976 to 1977), was talked about until November 1979, Peggy and Marty Dillman's son, adopted by Johnny Fletcher, stepson of Roger Thorpe, ceased appearing.
- Leona Herbert (Rosetta LeNoire, Fall 1970 to April 1972), Deborah Mehren's mother, ceased appearing.
- Marion Conway (Lois Holmes, January to April 1971; Kate Harrington, April 1971 to March 1972), Linell's mother, confessed to murdering Stanley Norris before dropping dead of a heart attack, character killed off.
- Claudia Dillman (Grace Matthews, 1971 and 1973), Marty Dillman's mother and Billy Fletcher's paternal grandmother, fought with Peggy and Johnny for guardianship of Billy and also tried to gain guardianship of Billy against Peggy when Johnny abandoned them, written out.
- Charles "Charlie" Eiler (Graham Jarvis, May 1971 to January 1972), written out.
- Elizabeth "Betty" Eiler (Madeleine Sherwood Thornton, May 1971 to January 1972), Charlie's wife, written out.
- Karen Martin (Tudi Wiggins, September 1971 to March 1972), written out.
- Captain Jim Swanson (Lee Richardson, November 1971 to January 1972), Springfield police department Captain, arrested Leslie Jackson Bauer Norris for the murder of Stanley Norris, written out.
- Ira Newton (Sorrell Booke, January to April 1972), District Attorney, written out.
- Rita Putnam (Anne Shaler, January to March 1972), nosy television news reporter who broke the story during Leslie Norris' trial for murder of her husband, Stanley, that Leslie had an affair with her defense attorney, Mike Bauer, while married to his brother, written out.
- Dr. Dick Carey (Paul Nesbitt, January to March 1972; Roger Morden, April 1972 to March 1973), provided competition as an intern at Cedars to Dr. Johnny "John" Fletcher which caused Johnny stress and to become mentally unbalanced, tried to make a romantic play for Peggy Fletcher when Johnny left town, written out.
- Dr. Wilson Frost (Jack Betts, February 1973 to May 1974), brother of Audrey Mills, character involved with Dr. Sara McIntyre Werner during the time that Dr. Joe Werner was involved with Charlotte Waring and then Kit Vestid, the relationship stayed platonic, even if Frost wanted otherwise—may have unwittingly helped Kit in some of her crimes, ceased appearing
- Sir Clayton Olds (Miles Easton, 1973–1974), a British psychiatrist treating Victoria Ballenger's lover, in Europe, for depression, which made Victoria hit Steve Jackson up for more money, under false pretenses, written out.
- Dr. Tom Halverson (Chris Sarandon, 1973 to May 1974), a Cedars intern, originally involved with Charlotte Waring post her marriage to Mike Bauer, Charlotte tried to pair Tom up with Kit Vestid—but Kit was uninterested in any man except Dr. Joe Werner, later was used unwittingly by Kit in some of her crimes, written out.
- Dr. Timothy "Tim" Ryan (Jordan Clarke, Fall 1974 to March 1977), neurosurgeon at Cedars, ceased appearing.
- Pamela "Pam" Chandler (Maureen Silliman, May 1974 to July 1976), an orphan who was pregnant by a college man who originally didn't want to marry for kids, found by Mike Bauer sleeping in a bus station, lived with Bert Bauer, worked for Ken Norris and Mike and then Dr. Sara McIntyre, was in love with Tim Ryan but nothing ever happened about it, eventually found her happiness as the college man reunited with her and they left town, written out.
- Alex McDaniels (Keith Charles, 1974 to September 1975), Hope Bauer's professor in Bay City, Hope and Alex had an affair, despite the fact that the older Alex was married with children, Mike went, to San Francisco, and confronted Alex about the affair and Alex arrived in Springfield and told Hope they were over, written out.
- Timothy John "T. J." Werner (Timothy John "T.J." Hargrave, February 1975 to spring 1977), Sara and Joe's adopted son, ceased appearing in this decade (would later return SORASed in February 1980 played by Kevin Bacon).
- Louise Johnson (Angeline Butler, February 1975), the social case worker assigned to T.J. Werner when he was first brought into Cedars as an ill runaway.
- Chad Richards (Everett McGill, July 1975 to March 1976), a singer at The Metro nightclub owned by Roger Thorpe, who ended up collapsing and taken to Cedars ER, a brain tumor patient who was a patient of Dr. Steve Jackson, with Nurse Rita Stapleton being his nurse, a former love interest of Leslie Jackson who Steve promised he'd find a way to help remove the tumor, over Thanksgiving time 1975 tried to beat up Leslie Jackson Bauer Norris Bauer until Mike stopped him; had a fling with Hope Bauer as she was working at The Metro until he left town for an experimental operation to remove his tumor; written out.
- Ann Jeffers (Maureen Mooney, September 1975 until end of decade), originally seen as a patient of Dr. Joe Werner's, a client of Mike Bauer's, later became his office assistant.
- Spencer "Spence" Jeffers AKA Clint Pearson (John Ramsey, March 1976 to April 1977), Ann's husband, character committed suicide in prison.
- Jimmy Jeffers, character talked about, but not seen, Jimmy was the son of Spence and Ann that Spence had taken away after a nasty divorce and hid from Ann.
- Gloria (Diane Lewis, May 1976 until end of decade), Dr. Ed Bauer's secretary.
- Malcolm Granger (Edward "Ed" Seamon, September 1976 to March 1978), character murdered in November 1976; shown subsequently in flashbacks through March 1978.
- Georgene Belmont Granger (Delphi Harrington, November 1976 to March 1978), Malcolm's wife who murdered him and his father Cyrus, went to prison.
- Raymond Shafer (Keith Aldrich, November 1976 to March 1978), the Granger family attorney who prosecuted Rita Stapleton for the murders of Cyrus and Malcolm, also let Mike Bauer know that Rita had inherited Cyrus' money and also helped Mike and the police be aware that Georgene was indeed stalking Rita, written out.
- Eric Van Gelder (Larry Gates, January 1977 to June 1977; April to May 1978), District Attorney during Rita Stapleton's murder trial, and during Bill Bauer's trial for murdering Victor Kincaid, written out.
- Cyrus Granger, October 1977 to March, 1978, Granger family patriarch for whom Rita had worked as a private duty nurse, prior to her arrival in Springfield, murdered off-screen in late 1974–early 1975; character shown only in flashbacks.
- Brandy Shelloe (Sandy Faison, 1977, JoBeth Williams, 1977 to December 1978), a former 1960s lover of Dr. Justin Marler that caused the original split between Justin and Jackie and forced Jackie to give up Phillip to Alan and Elizabeth Spaulding, she was originally introduced as an author of spicy novels and then became when JoBeth Williams took over the role a journalist trying to get a juicy scoop on Alan Spaulding, had many verbal fights with Jackie, Dr. Sara McIntyre and Diane Ballard, had romances with Justin, Alan and Dr. Peter Chapman and there was some implication as she was leaving in the fall of 1978 that she might be pregnant with Justin's child, written out.
- Dr. Peter Chapman (Curt Dawson, May 1977 until end of decade), pediatrician at Cedars, dated Rita Stapleton and Brandy Shelloe, a lover of Maya Waterman and then Holly Norris Bauer Thorpe and was engaged to Maya and then to Holly.
- Kathryn "Katie" Parker (Denise Pence, June 1977 until end of decade), sarcastic, good natured nurse at Cedars, hired to fill vacancy after Peggy's departure. Best friend and roommate of Hillary Bauer, and sporadic love interest to Dr. Mark Hamilton.
- Dr. Paul La Crosse (Jacques Roux, Fall 1977 until end of decade)
- Simone Kincaid (Laryssa Lauret, September 1977 to March 3, 1978), Hillary Bauer's mother, written out.
- Max Chapman (Ben Hammer, October 1977 to April 1978), Peter's father, original editor of the Springfield Journal (later referenced as being hired by 1980s character Julia Stoddard), dated Barbara Norris Thorpe, written out.
- Diane Ballard (Sofia Landon Geier, February 1978 until end of decade), introduced as Phillip's nanny; later became Alan's office assistant and part-time lover, knew a lot of Alan's damaging secrets, had a one-night stand with Ben McFarren which Lucille Wexler found out about that Lucille used to break-up Ben and Evie's marriage.
- Dean Blackford (Gordon Rigsby, March 1978 until January 1979), Sara's third husband, whom she met while she was on vacation in Hawaii, and Alan's attorney especially during the custody case of Phillip, murdered a man named Ramon De Vilar who claimed to have knowledge of an affair Elizabeth had while she was still married to Alan, killed off by falling off a cliff as he was trying to kill Sara, character killed off.
- Lt. Larry Wyatt (Joe Ponazecki, Winter 1978 until end of decade), Springfield police chief.
- Linette Waterman (Eileen Dietz, Summer 1978), killed in scuba diving accident in Santo Domingo while Peter Chapman was trying to teach her how to scuba dive, character seen only in flashbacks, deceased.
- Maya Waterman (Sands Hall, Summer 1978), Linette's older sister and Peter Chapman's former lover while he was in the Peace Corps, attempted to have Peter stay with her in Santo Domingo after she showed him that he wasn't at fault for Linette's death, character stopped appearing but character was talked about until end of decade.
- Carmen Monvales (Julie Carmen, June to October 1978; Bianca Camacho, November 1978 until end of decade), Linette's best friend, later worked as Lucille Wexler's housekeeper.
- Dr. Mark Hamilton (Burton Cooper, July 1978 until end of decade)
- Lucille Wexler (Rita Lloyd, July 13, 1978, until end of decade) introduced as Ben and Eve McFerren's landlady, later became involved in stories involving the Spaulding family.
- Amanda Wexler (Kathleen Cullen, July 18, 1978, until end of decade), introduced as Lucille's sheltered daughter, a classical pianist, began a relationship with Ben.
- Gordon Middleton (Marcus Smythe, August 1978 to December 1979), Amanda's first husband.
- Gladys Shields (Louise Troy, August 1978 to December 1978), an interior decorator who worked with Alan Spaulding, was Hope Bauer's first employer, ceased appearing.
- Whitney Foxton (Joseph Maher, December 1978 to July 1979), an employee of Lucille Wexler's real estate business, immediate supervisor of Eve Stapleton McFerren's while she worked for Lucille, tried to spark some romance with Eve but Eve refused, but Whitney's attempt Ben McFerren would walk in on which would prompt him to get drunk and have a one-night stand with Diane Ballard, written out.
- Neil Blake (Patrick Horgan, March 1979 until end of decade), Alan Spaulding's personal attorney who replaced the deceased Dean Blackford.
- District Attorney Clarence Bailey (Philip Bosco, 1979)
- Lydia Singer (Lydia Mahan, March to May 1979), nurse at Cedars who was in competition for Dr. Mark Hamilton against Katie, Katie tried to use her brother Floyd to distract Lydia from Mark, ceased appearing.
- Floyd Parker (Tom Nielson, April 26, 1979, until end of decade), Katie's younger brother.
- Dr. Gonzalo Moreno (Gonzalo Madurga, June 1979 until end of decade)
- Clara Jones (Anna Marie Horsford, June 1979 to November 1979), Holly's cellmate, written out.
- Carter Bowden (Alan Austin, July 1979 until end of decade), Alex Bowden and Doris Crandall's son, gallery owner who exhibited Ben's work.
- Dr. Greg Fairbanks (David Greenan, August 1979 until end of decade), introduced as Rita Bauer's high school boyfriend from West Virginia, who'd relocated to Springfield, had affairs with Rita and Diane Ballard, started dating Eve Stapleton despite finding out that Rita was pregnant and perhaps with his child.
- Dr. Margaret Sedwick (Margaret Gwenver, September 1979 until end of decade), Cedars OB-GYN.
- Dr. Renee DuBois (Deborah May, October 1979 until end of decade), a Paris plastic surgeon whom Roger Thorpe hired to change his face when other people thought he was dead.

== Plot development ==
In 1970, Dr. Sara McIntyre Gantry hears strange sounds on the roof of her husband Lee Gantry's farmhouse. Lee and Miss Mildred Foss attribute the sounds to squirrels. During a thunderstorm in January 1970, Lee is out of town, and the sounds become more frightening to Sara. She goes upstairs to investigate with her gun and sees a shadowy figure by the bay window. She shoots at the figure, which turns out to be the dead body of Miss Mildred Foss. The District Attorney's office rules the incident as an accident and clears Sara of any charges.

Despite the District Attorney's ruling, Lee Gantry continues to gaslight Sara for her money, and she briefly stays in the mental ward at Cedars. Dr. Paul Fletcher believes Sara is overreacting, but Dr. Joe Werner remains concerned. Meta Bauer Banning tells Joe about Lee's first wife, Alice Rawlings, and they discover evidence that Lee murdered Alice. Sara finds Alice's diary, and Lee tries to kill her when he catches her reading it. Joe fights Lee and accidentally pushes him out of the bay window, killing him. Sara and Joe get married on December 31, 1970.

Nurse Leslie Jackson Bauer's marriage to Stanley Norris is marred by Stanley's affairs all over town. In September 1971, Stanley is found shot to death in his office. His wife Leslie becomes the main suspect and is put on trial for his murder, with Mike Bauer defending her. In the end, Marion Conway confesses to shooting Stanley due to her daughter's fantasies about him. Marion dies of a heart attack in the courtroom after her confession. Leslie is acquitted of Norris' murder, and Linell leaves Springfield to start anew.

Mike hears from Hope and Bert that Charlotte is an awful stepmother. During Leslie's trial, Mike's true feelings for Leslie are revealed, and Charlotte becomes jealous and resentful. She throws Mike's law books in the rain and attempts to become pregnant. Flip Malone kidnaps Charlotte, and Bert and Papa are angry with Mike for resuming his affair with Leslie. Mike rescues Charlotte, but she has a miscarriage. Dr. Steve Jackson warns Mike not to cause a scandal by divorcing Charlotte, and Charlotte claims to be pregnant. The court grants Mike a divorce in winter of 1973, and he marries Leslie in late spring of 1973.

Johnny Fletcher's marriage to Peggy deteriorates when he becomes overworked and mentally unbalanced as a doctor at Cedars. In December 1972, Johnny leaves town for unknown parts, leaving Peggy to raise Billy alone and work as a nurse at Cedars.

Sara and Joe's marriage suffers when Joe begins an affair with Sara's nemesis, Charlotte Waring. Charlotte dies in August 1973 from poisoning, and Joe is blamed for her death and fired from Cedars. He later becomes involved with the unstable Kit Vested, who tries to poison both Sara and Joe. During a struggle over a gun, Kit is accidentally shot and killed in April 1974, exonerating Joe of Charlotte's death. Sara and Joe adopt a son, T.J., but Joe's heart condition worsens, and he dies of a heart attack while in India in December 1976.

Papa Bauer dies in his sleep in February 1973, a few months after Theo Goetz's death in December 1972.

In the 1970s, Bert Bauer's sons fight over Leslie, who loves Ed but their marriage fails due to his alcoholism. Leslie later becomes involved with Mike, but is tragically killed in a hit-and-run accident in June 1976, leaving behind their young son Freddie.

Mike and Leslie have an overall idyllic marriage, despite Leslie's false trial for Stanley's murder and the discovery that Roy Mills, not Dr. Steve Jackson, is her biological father. However, Ed, Barbara, and Stanley's children, Ken and Holly, experience interesting twists and turns.

In December 1969, Ed returns to Springfield after learning of his father's presumed death in a plane crash, and Janet follows him. Unfortunately, Janet learns that Ed is still in love with Leslie. Then, Janet's father, Grove Mason, shows up in Springfield and confronts Ed about being unfaithful to Leslie with Janet, causing Grove to collapse and die from a heart attack. Leslie grants Ed a divorce and later marries Stanley and then Mike. Meanwhile, Ed is pursued by several women, but Janet cools things off due to her father's death.

Ken Norris briefly dates his former stepmother, Kit Vestid, but becomes interested in Janet Mason, who is now available. Despite Ken's reputation for being mentally unstable, he surprises everyone by marrying Janet, who seems to love him despite his issues.

Holly almost gets hit by a car and ends up in Cedars hospital, where she is treated by Ed, a 30-year-old physician who has been in uneventful relationships. Ed is taken with Holly and agrees to marry her in Las Vegas, but Holly is unaware that Ed is an alcoholic. When they return to Springfield, Ed's aunt Meta disapproves of Holly and expresses her dislike. Although Ed is regretful about his previous marriage, he is determined to make his marriage to Holly work, even though it begins under difficult circumstances.

Janet discovers that her mother, Ellen Mason, is an alcoholic following her husband's death. She asks Ed to help her mother get into Alcoholics Anonymous, which makes Ken pathologically and violently jealous. Ken becomes violent with Janet and forces her to have sex with him, resulting in a pregnancy. Janet gives birth to a daughter named Emily. Ellen goes to AA after Emily's birth, and Ken becomes more mentally stable after seeing a psychiatrist. However, when Ellen has an alcoholic relapse, Ken catches Janet and Ed talking and becomes even more jealous, stopping his medication and faking blindness after crashing the car. Ken talks his sister Holly into believing the worst about Ed and Janet's renewed closeness. In April 1975, Ken shoots Ed in the hand outside Holly and Ed's house after waiting in the bushes with a revolver.

Ed is rushed to Cedars after Ken shoots him in the hand, rendering him unable to perform surgery. Ken is taken to a mental hospital and doesn't resurface until 1998. Janet, along with Emily and Ellen, relocates to San Francisco. Ellen passes away in 1995, and Barbara visits them from time to time in San Francisco. Ken eventually returns to Springfield and lives near his daughter Emily.

After Joe's death in December 1976, Sara starts dating Joe's former cardiologist Justin Marler, but slows things down when Justin's ex-wife Jackie shows up in town. Jackie also starts seeing Mike Bauer. Mike eventually breaks things off with Jackie, while Sara breaks things off with Justin when she finds out about his one-night stand.

In November 1977, Alan Spaulding arrives at the Spaulding summer estate with his wife Elizabeth and her son Phillip. Elizabeth is unaware that her baby was stillborn, and Alan obtained Phillip from an unknown woman who turns out to be Jackie Marler. Jackie marries Alan after his divorce from Elizabeth to be close to her son.

Alan carries on an affair with Phillip's former governess, Diane Ballard, whom he hires as his personal assistant at Spaulding Enterprises. Diane has hopes of becoming the next Mrs. Spaulding, but Alan marries two other women instead. Alan's personal attorney, Dean Blackford, comes to town and marries Dr. Sara McIntyre. Mike Bauer warns Sara that Dean is not trustworthy, and it is later revealed that he is indeed shady. Dean tries to win sole custody of Phillip for Alan by paying a man to falsely testify against Elizabeth. This works for a while, but eventually, Dean is threatened by the man he paid off and ends up killing him. Dean also tries to kill Sara, but Mike saves her and Dean falls to his death from a cliff. Elizabeth falls in love with Mike but can't marry him because Phillip blames him for his parents' breakup, thanks to Alan's manipulation.

In 1975, nurse Rita Stapleton arrives at Cedars and begins working there. She dates surgeon Tim Ryan briefly, but doesn't pursue a relationship with him, and instead helps him get together with her friend Pam Chandler. Rita catches the eye of Dr. Ed Bauer and they become close, with Rita helping Ed overcome his alcoholism. Despite pressure from Tim to marry him, Rita has feelings for Ed, despite her past with his nemesis Roger Thorpe. Ed and Rita grow closer when Rita's sister Eve and their mother Viola arrive in Springfield after Viola suffers a stroke. Holly Norris, Ed's ex-wife, tries to win him back, but Rita discovers her attempt and throws out the evidence.

In 1975-76, Hope returns to Springfield as a naive college student, having had a relationship with her married professor, Alex McDaniels, in Bay City. Mike is angry and confronts McDaniels in San Francisco, causing Hope to move out and get a job at Roger Thorpe's night club, The Metro. Hope later becomes infatuated with artist Ben McFarren, who previously dated Pam Chandler. When Mike discovers Ben was involved in a robbery, Ben reveals that he was covering for his younger brother. Despite Mike's newfound respect for Ben, Hope is disturbed when Ben asks her to pose nude and ends things with him. She decides to leave town to attend a design school.

Ed proposes to Rita, but on the same day, she gets arrested and charged with murder. Rita has a questionable history with bad boy Roger Thorpe. During her trial for the murder of Cyrus Granger, an elderly wealthy rancher from Waco, Texas, whom she works as a private duty nurse for a year earlier, and his son Malcolm Granger, who follows her to Springfield and dies under mysterious circumstances at Cedars after a heart attack, it is discovered that Rita is in a sexual relationship with Roger at the time of Cyrus's murder, providing her with a solid alibi. The jury finds Rita not guilty of both murders since she has no motive for killing Malcolm.

The events in Waco occurred off-camera in 1974 and early 1975 and were told mostly in flashbacks since Zaslow was absent from the show for three months. Although Rita was cleared of all charges, her relationship with Ed suffered due to his hatred for Roger, who had an affair with Holly during their short marriage. Roger is actually the biological father of Holly's child, Christina, who was born in July 1975. This truth emerged when Chrissy needed a blood transfusion, and Holly couldn't provide it due to having had hepatitis as a child. Furthermore, Roger once attempted to rape Holly's sister-in-law, Janet Mason Norris.

Rita briefly dates Dr. Peter Chapman, but realizes he is more attracted to Holly. Rita becomes the subject of a stalker, who turns out to be Georgene Belmont Granger. Georgene confesses to being the real murderer of Cyrus and responsible for her husband Malcolm's death. Ed and Chief Larry Wyatt overhear the confession, arrest Georgene, and Rita donates her inheritance to Cedars.

A strange man starts following the Bauer family around Springfield. Later, it's revealed that he is Hillary Kincaid's father, who is a student nurse interning at Cedars. Hillary is mystified when her father refuses to meet her colleagues, especially Ed and Rita. Mike is honored as Man of the Year by the Springfield Chamber of Commerce, and Rita sees the same man watching the ceremony tearfully. Rita follows him and learns that he is Bill Bauer, Ed and Mike's presumed-dead father. Bill explains that he missed the plane that crashed eight years ago, and instead had been having an affair with Simone Kincaid in Vancouver. He did not contact Bert, his wife, to tell her he was alive. Eventually, he made his way to Simone and stayed with her ever since.

Bill reveals himself first to Mike, then to Ed and Bert. Although he doesn't stay in Springfield, he makes peace with the Bauers, and Ed and Mike accept Hillary as their half-sister. However, Bert has to pay back the expenses on the life insurance payout that happened back in 1969 when Bill was thought to have died in the plane crash.

Roger Thorpe's character on the show has been in a destructive relationship with Holly since 1971, but it's not until the Dobsons arrived that the character turns truly malevolent. Despite Roger's involvement with Peggy, he decides to open up a nightclub, The Metro, and borrows heavily from loan sharks. When he gets beaten up and afraid to go to Peggy, Holly pays off the loan. They end up having an affair while she's still married to Ed. Holly lies to everyone that Chrissy, the child she is pregnant with, is Ed's. Roger never tells Peggy about the affair or Chrissy. Out of guilt, he confesses to Peggy and causes Ed and Holly's divorce. Peggy marries Roger in 1976 but eventually leaves him after he becomes verbally abusive and their one-night stand is revealed during Rita Stapleton's trial. Peggy moves to Boise, Idaho with Billy.

Roger took up briefly with Hillary Kincaid Bauer, who was still vulnerable from having learned of her father's double life. Rita, who had grown close to Hillary and felt protective of her, saw that Roger was merely seeing Hillary to get to Ed and Mike (since she had been revealed to be their half-sister). On October 9, 1978, Rita confronted Roger about his misguided relationship with Hillary. Roger became enraged, blaming Rita for his own failed marriage to Peggy (due to his providing Rita an alibi during her murder trial) and raped Rita. By this time, she had patched things up with Ed and they were engaged. Rita, afraid to tell Ed for fear that he wouldn't believe her (given her and Roger's history), remained silent and they were married in November 1978. Roger also was involved with Dean Blackford, after Roger discovered the de Vilar affidavits. Dean tried to run down Roger with his car, in the Spaulding garage, but Dean didn't succeed. After Dean died, Roger stole the affidavits and would blackmail his then-boss, Alan, with them. Roger also bought a revolver, for protection, and stayed briefly in Katie and Hillary's apartment to investigate the hit-and-run (Roger assumed it was Rita wanting revenge for the rape, until he stumbled upon evidence pointing to Dean), until he wooed Holly into marrying him. (This would cause Hillary to break-up with Roger, despite the fact at the time she was working briefly at Spaulding Enterprises and had to continue to see him at work.) Holly would get mad at Roger for having a gun in the house, and Roger took it and put it in his desk drawer at Spaulding Enterprises.

Zaslow was unhappy with his earlier rape scenes with Rita, which he felt came across as a seduction. The Dobsons crafted a full-fledged marital rape (at the time this was not considered a crime) in a March 1979 episode involving Roger and Holly who had married in January 1979. This rape scene was a counterattack against rival network NBC's soap opera Another World, whose much ballyhooed expansion to 90-minute telecasts (complete with the death of a major character) happened that same day.

Holly bravely took Roger to court, but Justin's sleazy lawyer brother Ross, hired by Alan, got Roger acquitted. (Ross would quickly reform and became a core character, remaining on the show for the next twenty-five years.) In June 1979, when it looked as though Roger was going to be acquitted, Rita could no longer bear the guilt and came forward to confess to Ed that Roger had also raped her. Upon learning of Rita's rape, Ed angrily stormed off to confront Roger in his office at Spaulding. Meanwhile, as this was happening, Holly learned that Roger had told Chrissy (within earshot of Barbara) that he planned to take her out of the country, and also headed to Roger's office at Spaulding, walking in on Ed and Roger engaged in a fist fight. Holly pulled the gun out of Roger's desk and pointed it at Roger telling him to "Stop!" Afraid that he would be acquitted and terrified that he would take their daughter Christina out of the country, and also flashing back to the rape, Holly shot Roger three times. (The sequence of events of the shooting was the first set of scenes that were submitted that would help the show win its first Daytime Emmy Award for Outstanding Daytime Drama in May 1980.) Roger was taken to Cedars, and then taken by Alan to a specialist out of the country and was declared legally dead. Holly was convicted, despite the extenuating circumstances and sent to prison (she'd had flashed back to the rape).

While Holly was in prison, Ed and Rita raised Christina. Rita felt an enormous sense of guilt at not having come forward when Roger raped her, and felt that Ed also blamed her for Holly's troubles. To make matters worse, Ed seemed to be more concerned for Holly, and later Elaine "Lainie" Marler, Justin and Ross' younger sister (who had been a victim of a hit-and-run while training for a marathon), making Rita feel all the more neglected. She started having an affair with a former boyfriend from high school, Dr. Greg Fairbanks, who had just relocated to Springfield. Fairbanks was also dating Rita's younger sister Eve at the time, though neither sister initially knew that he was seeing the other. (Eve had just divorced her husband, artist Ben McFarren.) When Rita later found out she was pregnant, she wasn't sure if the baby was Ed's or Greg's; she initially planned to abort the pregnancy, but after discussing her situation with her mother, Viola (who offered to raise the baby herself, if Rita would go through with the pregnancy), she decided to have the baby.

Shortly before Christmas 1979, Holly was released from prison when Sara and Mike showed the court that Holly had indeed flashed back to the rape the day she shot and "killed" Roger and Roger's "body" was exhumed and it turned out not to be Roger in the grave. Roger was very much alive and moved to Paris, France trying to get a woman doctor named Renee DuBois to give him, going by the name of Arthur Green, a face lift. (Renee gave him only surface face changes, realizing that Arthur Green was a suspicious character.) Then in February 1980, Roger attempted to abduct Christina from a charity carnival for Cedars at a nearby park, but instead, in an Emmy-winning sequence (the second set of scenes submitted), circumstances led to his chasing a pregnant Rita through a hall-of-mirrors as the Donna Summer/Barbra Streisand hit "No More Tears (Enough is Enough)" played in the background. Roger kidnapped Rita, holding her captive in the Bauer cabin for several days. When in haste to escape Mike and Ed who were closing in, he knocked over a kerosene lantern, setting the cabin on fire. Ed and Mike were able to rescue Rita, but the baby did not survive the ordeal. (The baby would turn out to be a boy and be Ed's son—not Greg's as Rita had feared.) Kasdorf was also pregnant in real life at the time and later said that she found the emotional scenes were tough to play; the actress would take several months of maternity leave shortly after filming the miscarriage scenes. (It was explained that Rita returned with her mother, Viola, for a visit to West Virginia.) Roger would later attempt to kidnap Christina, in Santo Domingo but ended up kidnapping Holly, leading her into the Island of Lost Soul's jungle with Ed and Mike in pursuit.

Roger would also be responsible for the death of Dr. Renee DuBois, who had arrived in town to testify at some future point that Arthur Green was indeed Roger. Renee in her short time in Springfield developed romantic feelings for Mike Bauer (he did as well back), but one evening Roger entered her hotel room and shocked her. As a scared Renee was backing out away from him she ended up falling backwards to her death, dying in Mike's arms.

The Bauers' and the Spauldings' lives grew ever-more complicated as Alan married Mike's daughter Hope, against the wishes of her father. (Mike still resented Alan for sabotaging his relationship with ex-wife Elizabeth Spaulding, by poisoning his son Philip against Mike, and also because he felt certain that Alan was involved in criminal activity, possibly working with Roger.) Upon Rita's return to Springfield during the summer of 1980, she and Ed tried to resume their marriage, but were forced to admit that they'd grown too far apart; Rita and Alan became close during this time, and eventually, their relationship evolved into an ongoing affair (despite the fact that Rita was, by marriage, Hope's aunt). When the affair finally was exposed by blackmailer Andy Norris in June 1981, Rita left town for good.

In 1977, the character Nurse Katie Parker was introduced around the same time that Roger's first wife (and longtime Bauer friend) Nurse Peggy Scott Dilman Fletcher Thorpe (still played by Fran Myers) left town with her teenage son Billy Fletcher, after learning about the tryst Roger had had with Rita. (Peggy and Myers though did make a return to the show from November 1978 to November 1979 when she came for Ed and Rita's wedding and stayed on staff at Cedars while others were busy with several other activities.) Kind natured, though somewhat insecure and weight-conscious, Katie became roommates with Hillary Bauer and, for a time, struck up a romance with Dr. Mark Hamilton who kept putting off marrying Katie. Hillary was also not bereft of suitors after her nasty break up with Roger Thorpe. Katie's rough-edged younger brother, Floyd Parker, showed up on Katie and Hillary's doorstep in March 1979 and took an instant shine to Hillary. Hillary though found Floyd not to be to her liking and still felt gun shy to get involved in relationship post her break-up with Roger. Floyd also found himself falling for Justin and Ross' younger sister, Lainie Marler, who had to learn to walk again (let alone run track and field as she had done before) after being run into by a van. Lainie briefly became enamored of both Ed and Mark while in recovery at Cedars. Katie for a time became a television personality involved with a children's show and later learned that Mark was two-timing her with other women and dumped him. Lainie briefly worked for Mike and another attorney, Derek Colby introduced in 1980, after Ann Jeffers left for another job offer. Lainie would later get involved with Chicago art gallery owner Carter Bowden and would marry him in February 1981 and they would move to Chicago. Lainie was briefly seen in June and July 1982.

Mike got Holly's friend and former prison inmate, Clara Jones (played by Anna Maria Horsford) released from prison. Horsford was one of the first African-American characters on the show to be given a substantial story line. Mike proved that Clara had not shot her husband, but that he was killed by drug dealers with whom he had gotten involved (the same ones that had driven the van that hit Lainie Marler.)

Hillary, though, would turn down both Floyd. During 1979, and early 1980, Hillary, Floyd, Katie and Mark provided much of the comic relief on the show.

In July 1978, Lucille Wexler and her daughter Amanda Wexler were introduced via Eve Stapleton and her husband, artist Ben McFarren. Ben had originally been romantically involved with Mike's daughter, Hope, back in 1976. But when Hope found out that Mike and Ben were covering up crimes involving Ben's younger brother, Jerry McFarren, Hope dumped him and left Springfield for a while, until she returned in 1979. (Hope and Jerry did make a brief visit to Springfield for Ed and Rita's wedding in November 1978.) Unfortunately, as she left town, Eve caught sight of Ben kissing Hope (not realizing they were saying goodbye), and ran out in the pouring rain, tripped and fell. This was the onset of a disease that had an 80% chance of leaving Eve blind. Not wanting to be a burden to Ben and against his strenuous objections, Eve insisted on canceling their November 24, 1977, wedding. Eventually, the couple found their way back to one another. Eve was still blind when she and Ben were married on May 26, 1978.

Later, a risky surgery helped regain Eve's eyesight. After they returned to Springfield from a second honeymoon, Ben and Eve moved into the Wexler Estate's small guest cottage. Lucille, an insecure, controlling woman, disapproved of Eve and her friends and family's rather liberal ways, and started becoming suspicious of the McFarrens. Lucille was harboring a secret that confused both Amanda and Amanda's first husband, architect Gordon Middleton, who Amanda left on her honeymoon when she couldn't be intimate with him.

Later, Eve would find out from Gordon that the reason for Amanda's lack of intimacy stemmed from watching Lucille being raped by a man, when Amanda was a young girl. But Lucille was apparently harboring more secrets than that, because when Ben tried to show his art work at the Binnoker art gallery to raise funds to send Eve to college to fulfill her dream of becoming a teacher (as her mother had been), Lucille secretly burned down the gallery. With no funds to send Eve to school, Lucille hired Ben and Eve to do various odd jobs around the main house at the Wexler Estate, and Ben was hired as a graphic artist at Spaulding Enterprises. Eve and Ben became virtual slaves to Lucille.

Ben also met up with the wild Diane Ballard, who, in her loneliness waiting for Alan, seduced Ben and they had an affair. At the same time Ben got Amanda to put away her dolls and stop acting like a child, and restart her dream of becoming a concert pianist. Amanda herself was falling for the worldly Ben, and Lucille started becoming nervous that Ben was going to find out all her secrets. She started to find ways to get Ben in trouble, and even kill him. The first thing Lucille did was make sure that in a visit to the Wexler Estate by Diane, Amanda found out about Ben and Diane's affair. A livid Amanda told Eve, which caused Eve to leave Ben, and move out on her own. Eve would first start a relationship with Dr. Greg Fairbanks (who was simultaneously having an affair with her sister Rita) and then surprisingly, with Ross Marler. Ross would be hired by Lucille as her attorney, and Ross would fall for Amanda, creating a very interesting quadrangle between Eve-Ben-Amanda-Ross. Amanda also helped Ben get a gallery showing of his art work at Carter Bowden's Chicago gallery.

Meanwhile, Lucille continued to look for ways to kill Ben, even though Lucille apparently had a debilitating stroke. Then in the November 1979, Lucille was summoned by Alan Spaulding's father, Brandon Spaulding to his "death" bed, and the audience would learn the startling secret that Lucille was hiding: that Amanda was actually the product of an affair between Alan and a woman that Alan had known when he was younger, Jane Marie Stafford. When Ben started to become suspicious of Lucille's involvement in Brandon's "death", Lucille continued to find even more bizarre ways to kill her nemesis, Ben McFarren. Of course Lucille couldn't stop Ben and Amanda from eventually marrying in March 1980.
