= Reckless (1995 film) =

- Original poster
- Directed by: Norman René
- Written by: Craig Lucas
- Based on: Reckless by Craig Lucas
- Produced by: Amy J. Kaufman; Lindsay Law
- Starring: Mia Farrow; Scott Glenn; Mary-Louise Parker; Tony Goldwyn
- Cinematography: Frederick Elmes
- Edited by: Michael Berenbaum
- Music by: Stephen Endelman
- Distributed by: The Samuel Goldwyn Company
- Release date: November 15, 1995
- Running time: 91 minutes
- Country: United States
- Language: English
- Box office: $103,351

Reckless is a 1995 American black comedy film. It stars Mia Farrow, Scott Glenn, Mary-Louise Parker, and Tony Goldwyn. The screenplay for the film by Craig Lucas is based on the 1983 play of the same name. It is the final film directed by Norman René.

== Plot ==
Relentlessly cheerful and hopelessly optimistic Rachel's seemingly perfect life is upended one Christmas Eve when her husband Tom announces he took a contract out on her life, but is having second thoughts about his decision to do so. Wearing only a nightgown and slippers, she hastily leaves Connecticut in a blizzard to escape the fate he planned for her. She is rescued by Springfield, Massachusetts social worker Lloyd, who brings her home to his deaf, mute, paraplegic wife Pooty. Rachel moves in with the couple and begins working with Lloyd at Hands Across the Sea, a charitable organization dedicated to helping the disabled.

Eventually, Rachel discovers both Lloyd and Pooty harbor secrets, his about a family he destroyed and abandoned, hers concerning a deception that has guaranteed her a life of ease and comfort. The trio's tranquil existence dissolves the following Christmas, and Rachel and Lloyd find themselves on a cross-country odyssey that takes them through numerous towns named Springfield, dogged by disaster. Lloyd's kindly facade shatters, and Rachel encounters a number of odd characters, including a less-than-helpful therapist and Tim Timko, the host of a television game show. Finally, having lost the power of speech, she finds herself in a homeless shelter run by Sister Margaret, who has her own share of dark secrets.

Several years later, she became a therapist. Her son comes to her asking for sleeping pills due to it being Christmas. He mentions how she looks like his mom, but she denies it. She gives him talk therapy instead of the annual pills.

== Cast ==
- Mia Farrow as Rachel
- Scott Glenn as Lloyd Buftalofty
- Mary-Louise Parker as Pooty
- Eileen Brennan as Sister Margaret
- Debra Monk as Therapist
- Giancarlo Esposito as Tim Timko
- William Fichtner as Rachel's Father
- Jack Gilpin as Weatherman
- Nancy Marchand as Grandmother
- Tony Goldwyn as Tom Fitzsimons
- Stephen Dorff as Tom Jr.
- Zach Grenier as Anchor Person

== Production notes ==
The soundtrack includes "I'll Be Home for Christmas" by Bing Crosby, "Silent Night" by Jack Jones, "O Little Town of Bethlehem" by Roger Williams, and "Joy to the World" and "Jingle Bells" by Pat Boone.

The film premiered at the Toronto International Film Festival in September 1995. It grossed only $103,351 in the United States.

== Critical reception ==
In his review in The New York Times, Stephen Holden called the film "a surreal comic allegory that suggests Alice in Wonderland fused with Candide into a contemporary antidote to Frank Capra's holiday heartwarmer It's a Wonderful Life . . . Reckless sustains the darkly zany atmosphere of a grown-up fairy tale far more successfully than Prelude to a Kiss, the director's earlier screen transposition of a Lucas play. But that doesn't make it easy. Audiences conditioned to expect conventional movie naturalism should be warned that Reckless is surreally stylized in its writing and production design and even in some of its acting. Ms. Farrow is so perfectly cast as Rachel that the character seems a distillation of nearly every role she has played since she was a teen-ager in Peyton Place. With her peaches-and-cream complexion and slightly whiny voice, Ms. Farrow has always epitomized a precocious, overgrown princess whose garrulity inspires protectiveness tinged with irritation. In Reckless, projecting a mixture of the sweetly forlorn and the intractably childish, she is nothing less than American innocence incarnate demanding to be snapped out of it."

Roger Ebert of the Chicago Sun-Times said, "It's one of those films where you think it's only a dream, and then when everyone wakes up, it's worse . . . That's not to say the movie doesn't have its qualities; the production design is intriguing, and Farrow knows exactly what she's doing with her innocent naivete."

In the San Francisco Chronicle, Mick LaSalle said the film "is at its best in the beginning, before it discovers its limits and exhausts its bag of tricks . . . Once you realize that Reckless intends only to be one joke repeated, it becomes exhausting."

Hal Hinson of The Washington Post observed, "Lucas articulates his themes with artful lucidity, but the movie is so literate, so written, that its emotional impact seems almost incidental to its design and the elegant play of its symmetries. In the end, the story unfolds, not for any strong dramatic motive, but to maintain the playwright's carefully created sense of balance and proportion. Though Lucas deals with heavyweight issues, his cool, studied approach somehow diminishes them . . . At times, the movie is preposterously, darkly funny, but instead of building momentum as it goes along, it dribbles away. Despite the author's obvious talents and expert craftsmanship, Reckless disintegrates into trivia."

In the San Francisco Examiner, Barbara Shulgasser said, "Surprises are great when they retrospectively make sense. Even if you didn't anticipate them on first viewing, when you think back to earlier scenes you can see how the author has prepared for the shocking events. Lucas just drops events into the action like non-sequiturs in conversation."
