= Mary-Louise Parker =

American actress (born 1964)

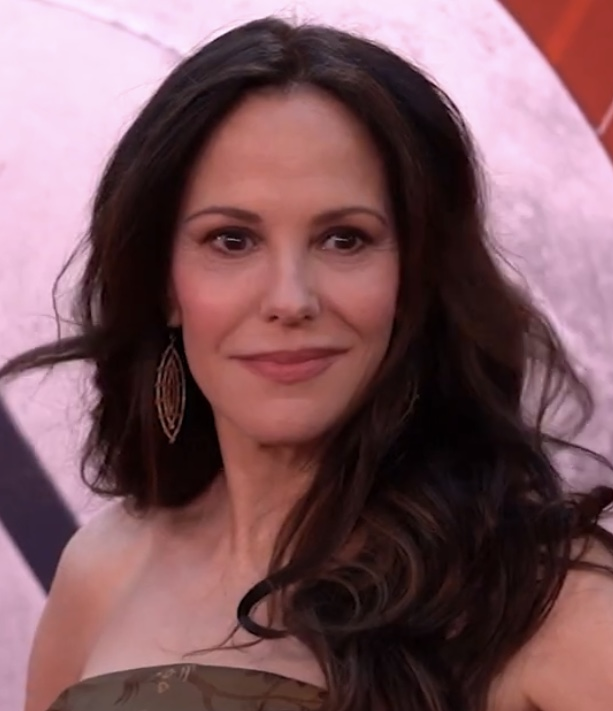
- Parker at the 74th Tony Awards in 2021
- Born: August 2, 1964 (age 62); Columbia, South Carolina, U.S.
- Education: University of North Carolina School of the Arts (BFA)
- Occupation: Actress
- Years active: 1987–present
- Partner(s): Billy Crudup (1996–2003); Jeffrey Dean Morgan (2006–2008)
- Children: 2, including William Atticus Parker

Mary-Louise Parker (born August 2, 1964) is an American actress. She is known for her roles on stage and screen and has received various accolades including two Golden Globe Awards, a Primetime Emmy Award and two Tony Awards.

Parker made her film debut in Signs of Life (1989) and came to prominence for film roles in Grand Canyon (1991), Fried Green Tomatoes (1991), The Client (1994), Bullets Over Broadway (1994), A Place for Annie (1994), Boys on the Side (1995), The Portrait of a Lady (1996), and The Maker (1997). Her later film appearances included roles in The Spiderwick Chronicles (2008), Red (2010), R.I.P.D. (2013), and Red 2 (2013).

On television, she portrayed Harper Pitt in the acclaimed HBO television miniseries Angels in America (2003) for which she won the Primetime Emmy Award for Outstanding Supporting Actress in a Limited Series or Movie. She was Emmy-nominated for her roles as Amy Gardner in the NBC series The West Wing (2001–2006), Nancy Botwin in the Showtime series Weeds (2005–2012), and Zenia in the television film The Robber Bride (2007). She took a recurring role in the NBC series The Blacklist (2014) and played Roma Guy in the miniseries When We Rise (2017).

On stage, Parker has earned two Tony Awards for Best Actress in a Play for her roles in David Auburn's Proof (2001) and Adam Rapp's The Sound Inside (2020). She was Tony-nominated for her roles in Prelude to a Kiss (1990), Reckless (2005), and How I Learned to Drive (2022). As a writer, Parker has contributed articles to Esquire magazine since 2007. She published her memoir, Dear Mr. You, in 2015.

== Early life and education ==
Parker was born in Columbia, South Carolina, the youngest of four children, to Caroline Louise (née Morell) and John Morgan Parker, a judge who served in the U.S. Army. Because of her father's career, Parker spent parts of her childhood in South Carolina, Tennessee, and Texas, as well as in Thailand, Germany, and France. She described her childhood as "profoundly unhappy", noting that, "My parents did everything they could; I had books, clothes, a home and a warm bed, but I was never happy." She graduated from Marcos de Niza High School in Tempe, Arizona. Parker majored in drama at the University of North Carolina School of the Arts and graduated in 1986.

== Acting career ==
=== 1988–1999: Early roles and Broadway debut ===
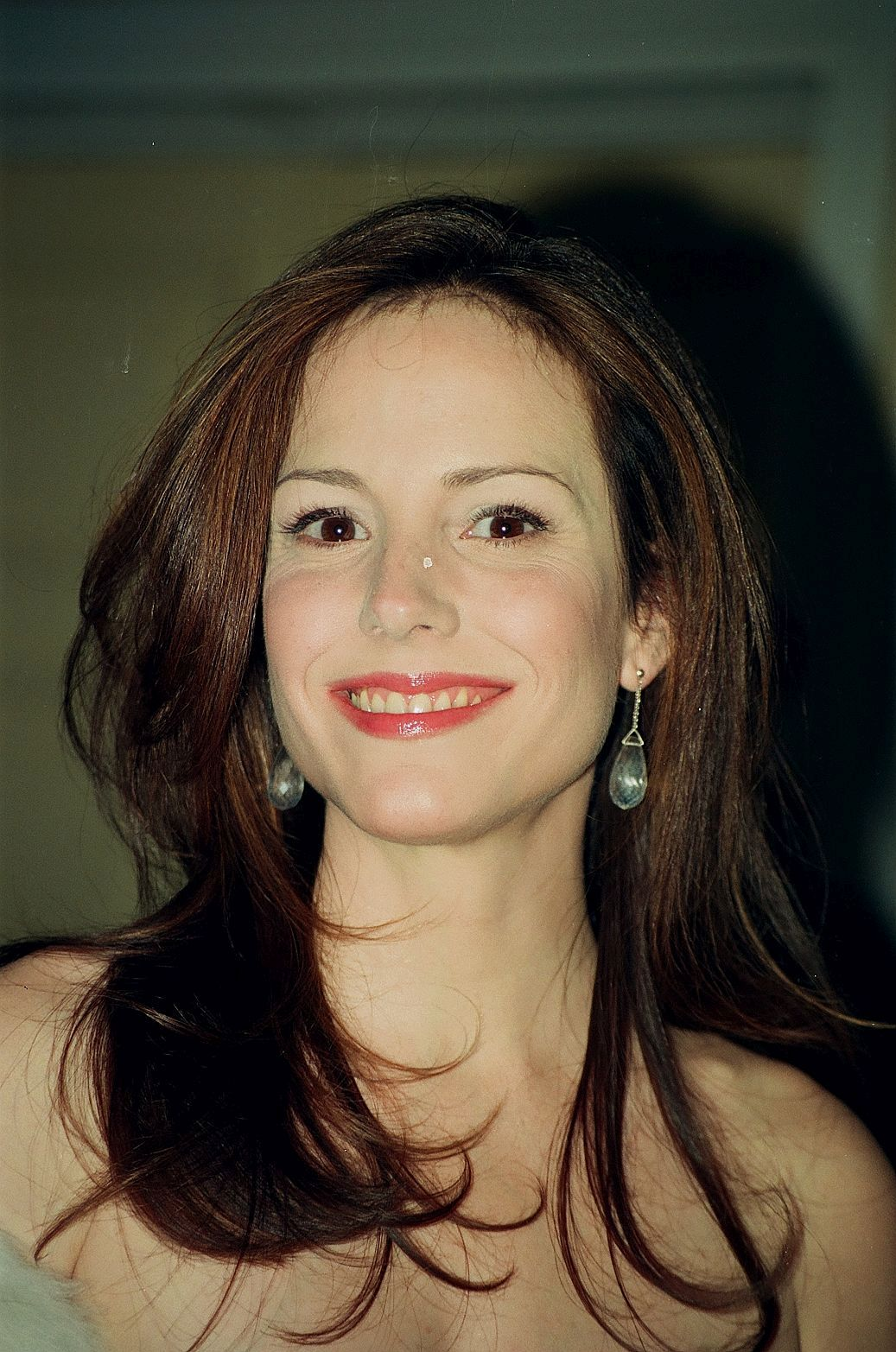
Parker in 1999

Parker got her start in acting with a role on the soap opera Ryan's Hope. In the late 1980s, Parker moved to New York City. After a few minor roles, she made her Broadway debut in a production of Craig Lucas' Prelude to a Kiss, playing the lead role of Rita, in 1990. She moved with the production when it transferred from its origin off-Broadway. Parker won the Clarence Derwent Award for her performance and was nominated for a Tony Award (although she did not play the role when the film was made). In 1989, she was in the film Longtime Companion, a film starring Campbell Scott, Bruce Davison and Dermot Mulroney about the emergence and devastation of the AIDS epidemic.

Parker starred with Kevin Kline in Grand Canyon (1991); with Kathy Bates, Mary Stuart Masterson, and Jessica Tandy in Fried Green Tomatoes (1991); with Susan Sarandon and Tommy Lee Jones in The Client (1994); with John Cusack in Bullets Over Broadway (1994); and with Drew Barrymore and Whoopi Goldberg in Boys on the Side (1995), as a woman with AIDS. Parker's next role was in a movie adaptation of another Craig Lucas play, Reckless (1995), alongside Mia Farrow, followed by Jane Campion's The Portrait of a Lady (1996), which also starred Nicole Kidman, Viggo Mortensen, Christian Bale, John Malkovich and Barbara Hershey. In addition she appeared alongside Matthew Modine in Tim Hunter's The Maker (1997).

Parker's theater career continued when she appeared off-Broadway in Paula Vogel's 1997 critical smash How I Learned to Drive, with David Morse. She received the 1997 Lucille Lortel Award, Outstanding Actress, and 1997 Obie Award, Performance for her performance.

In the late 1990s, she appeared in several independent films, including Let the Devil Wear Black and The Five Senses. She starred alongside Sidney Poitier in the 1999 movie The Simple Life of Noah Dearborn.

=== 2000–2012: Acclaim with Proof and Weeds ===
From 2000 to 2001, Parker starred in the play Proof in off-Broadway and Broadway productions, winning the Tony Award for Best Actress in a Play for the Broadway run.

In 2003, HBO aired the six-and-a-half-hour adaptation of Tony Kushner's acclaimed Broadway play Angels in America, directed by Mike Nichols. Parker played Harper Pitt, the Mormon, Valium-addicted wife of a closeted lawyer. For her performance, Parker won the Golden Globe Award for Best Supporting Actress – Series, Miniseries or Television Film and the Primetime Emmy Award for Outstanding Supporting Actress in a Limited or Anthology Series or Movie.

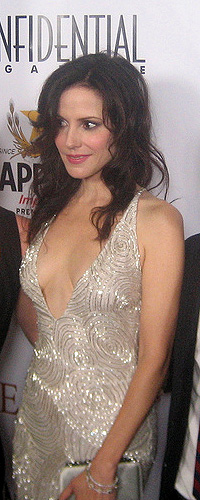
Parker in 2008

In 2004, Parker appeared in the comedy Saved! and the television film Miracle Run, based on the true story of a mother of two sons with autism, as well as appearing in the lead role in Craig Lucas' Reckless on Broadway. The production, directed by Mark Brokaw, earned Parker another Tony Award nomination in 2005. In November 2005, Parker was the subject of a career exhibition at Boston University, where memorabilia from her career were donated to the university's library.

In 2005, Parker began starring on the Showtime series Weeds. She played Nancy Botwin, a widowed mother of two boys who begins selling marijuana to support her family. In 2006, Parker won the Golden Globe Award for Best Actress – Television Series Musical or Comedy for her lead role in Weeds. In that category, she defeated the four leads of Desperate Housewives. She dedicated the award to the late John Spencer, known for his work as Leo McGarry on The West Wing. After receiving the award, Parker stated: "I'm really in favor of legalizing marijuana. I don't think it's that controversial."

In 2007, Parker played the lead role in the television film The Robber Bride, and portrayed Zerelda Mimms in the Andrew Dominik film The Assassination of Jesse James by the Coward Robert Ford. Parker appeared alongside Brad Pitt, Casey Affleck, Sam Rockwell, and Garret Dillahunt.

Parker appeared in 2008's The Spiderwick Chronicles and in off-Broadway's Playwrights Horizons production in the New York premiere of Dead Man's Cell Phone, a new play by Sarah Ruhl, alongside Drama Desk Award-winner Kathleen Chalfant.

Following this, she returned to work on the fifth season of Weeds. Parker took the lead role in the Roundabout Theatre revival of the play Hedda Gabler, running at the American Airlines Theatre in 2009, totaling 74 performances. The play garnered a series of negative reviews.

Parker starred opposite Bruce Willis in Red (2010), an adaptation of the comic book miniseries of the same name. The film earned positive reviews. In 2011, Parker became the host for the tenth season of the PBS documentary series Independent Lens.

=== 2013–2019: Established actress ===
In 2013, she played roles in both Red 2 and R.I.P.D. Also that year, she returned to Broadway in the Manhattan Theatre Club production of the play The Snow Geese by Sharr White at the Samuel J. Friedman Theatre. The play was directed by Daniel J. Sullivan and also starred Danny Burstein and Victoria Clark.

In 2015, Parker starred in the play by Simon Stephens, Heisenberg, produced off-Broadway by the Manhattan Theatre Club. Mark Brokaw directed it. The play transferred to Broadway at the Samuel J. Friedman Theatre in 2016, with Parker and Denis Arndt reprising their roles. The play later transferred to Center Theatre Group's Mark Taper Forum in 2017.

She returned to Broadway in the Adam Rapp play The Sound Inside at Studio 54 in 2019. She had performed in the world premiere of the play a year earlier at the Williamstown Theatre Festival. In 2021, she won the Tony Award for Best Actress in a Play for the Broadway run.

=== 2020–present ===
Parker appeared in the 2022 Broadway revival by the Manhattan Theatre Club of How I Learned to Drive, which was originally supposed to open at the Samuel J. Friedman Theatre in previews in 2020. David Morse co-starred, with direction by Mark Brokaw. This production united Parker, Morse and Brokaw from the original 1997 production. Because of the COVID-19 pandemic, this production was postponed to Manhattan Theater Club's 2021–22 season. She received her fifth Tony Award nomination for the production. In 2023, Parker appeared in the music video for country music duo The Reklaws' song "Honky Tonkin' About" with Drake Milligan.

In 2026, Parker made her London theater debut starring as Montie in The Oresteia at the Bridge Theatre. The contemporary re-imaging of the play was written and directed by Simon Stone.

== Writing career ==
Since 2007, Parker has contributed articles to Esquire magazine. In 2015, Scribner Books, an imprint of Simon & Schuster, published her memoir in letters titled Dear Mr. You.

== Personal life ==
=== Relationships and family ===
From 1996 to November 2003, Parker dated actor Billy Crudup. Their relationship ended in 2003 when Parker, who was seven months pregnant with their son William Atticus Parker, discovered that Crudup was leaving her for actress Claire Danes. William's godmother is actress Susan Sarandon. Parker was also briefly linked to Counting Crows frontman Adam Duritz.

In December 2006, Parker began dating actor Jeffrey Dean Morgan, whom she had met on the set of Weeds. On February 12, 2008, Parker and Morgan announced their engagement, only to break up in April 2008.

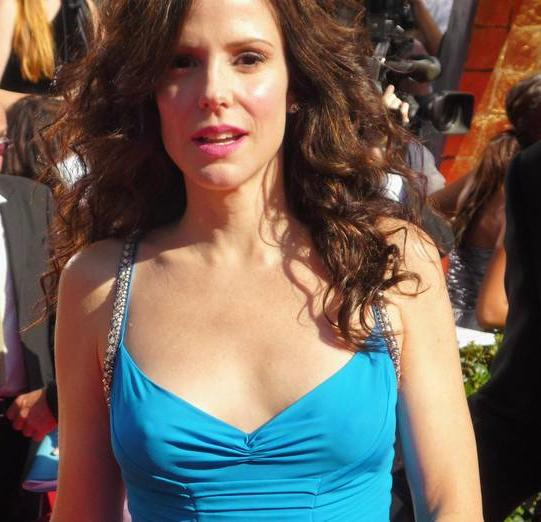
Parker at the 60th Primetime Emmy Awards in 2008

In September 2007, Parker adopted a baby girl from Ethiopia. Parker lives in Brooklyn Heights with her two children.

=== Charity and interests ===
In 2013, Parker was honored for her work with Hope North, an organization that works in the educating and healing of young victims in the Ugandan civil war. The actress began her involvement with the organization after meeting a former victim of Uganda's civil war.

Parker practices transcendental meditation. She says: "I'd always heard about transcendental meditation, and I thought, maybe that's the way back in for me. I learned TM and it changed everything." She also participates in a charity dinner for military veterans who are victims of post-traumatic stress disorder organized by the David Lynch Foundation's Operation Warrior Wellness's Resilient Warrior Program, with Tom Hanks.

== Acting credits ==
=== Film ===
Year	Title	Role
1989	Signs of Life	Charlotte
1989	Longtime Companion	Lisa
1991	Fried Green Tomatoes	Ruth Jamison
1991	Grand Canyon	Dee
1993	Mr. Wonderful	Rita
1993	Naked in New York	Joanne White
1994	Bullets Over Broadway	Ellen
1994	The Client	Dianne Sway
1995	Reckless	Pooty
1995	Boys on the Side	Robin Nickerson
1996	The Portrait of a Lady	Henrietta Stackpole
1997	Murder in Mind	Caroline Walker
1997	The Maker	Officer Emily Peck
1998	Goodbye Lover	Peggy Blane
1999	Let the Devil Wear Black	Julia Hirsch
1999	The Five Senses	Rona
2002	Red Dragon	Molly Graham
2002	The Quality of Mercy	Sarah Richardson
2002	Pipe Dream	Toni Edelman
2004	Saved!	Lillian Cummings
2004	The Best Thief in the World	Sue Zaidman
2006	Romance & Cigarettes	Constance Murder
2007	The Assassination of Jesse James by the Coward Robert Ford	Zee James
2008	The Spiderwick Chronicles	Helen Grace
2009	Solitary Man	Jordan Karsch
2010	Howl	Gail Potter
2010	Red	Sarah Ross
2013	R.I.P.D.	Mildred Proctor
2013	Red 2	Sarah Ross
2014	Behaving Badly	Lucy Stevens
2014	Jamesy Boy	Tracy Burns
2016	Chronically Metropolitan	Annabel
2017	Golden Exits	Gwendolyn
2018	Red Sparrow	Stephanie Boucher
2021	The Same Storm	Roxy
2023	Seneca – On the Creation of Earthquakes	Agrippina
2024	Omni Loop	Zoya Lowe
2024	Woody Woodpecker Goes to Camp	Angie
2026	Happy Hours	TBA
2026	Young Washington	Mary Ball Washington

=== Television ===
Year	Title	Role	Notes
1988	Too Young the Hero	Pearl Spencer	Television film
1994	A Place for Annie	Linda Marsten	Television film
1995	Sugartime	Phyllis McGuire	Television film
1998	Saint Maybe	Lucy Dean Bedloe	Television film
1998	Legalese	Rica Martin	Television film
1999	The Simple Life of Noah Dearborn	Dr. Valerie Crane	Television film
2000	Cupid & Cate	Cate DeAngelo	Television film
2001–2006	The West Wing	Amy Gardner	23 episodes
2002	Master Spy: The Robert Hanssen Story	Bonnie Hanssen	Television film
2003	Angels in America	Harper Pitt	6 episodes
2004	Miracle Run	Corrine Morgan-Thomas	Television film
2005	Vinegar Hill	Ellen Grier	Television film
2005–2012	Weeds	Nancy Botwin	Lead role
2007	The Robber Bride	Zenia Arden	Television film
2013	Christmas in Conway	Suzy Mayor	Television film
2014	The Blacklist	Naomi Hyland	4 episodes
2017	When We Rise	Roma Guy	7 episodes
2017	Billions	George Minchak	2 episodes
2017	Mr. Mercedes	Janey Patterson	6 episodes
2021	Colin in Black & White	Teresa Kaepernick	6 episodes
2023	Jane	Robin	Episode: "Acerodon jubatus"
2025	Elsbeth	Freya Frostad	2 episodes
2025	The Institute	Ms. Sigsby	8 episodes
2026	The Gray House	Eliza Van Lew	8 episodes

=== Theatre ===
Year(s)	Production	Role	Location	Venue
1989	The Importance of Being Ernest	Cecily Cardew	Hartford Stage	Regional
1989–1990	The Art of Success	Jane Hogarth	New York City Center Stage I	Off-Broadway
1990	Prelude to a Kiss	Rita Boyle	Circle Repertory Theatre	Off-Broadway
1990–1991	Prelude to a Kiss	Rita Boyle	Helen Hayes Theatre	Broadway
1991	Babylon Gardens	Jean	Circle Repertory Theatre	Off-Broadway
1993	Four Dogs and a Bone	Brenda	New York City Center Stage II	Off-Broadway
1996	Bus Stop	Cherie	Circle in the Square Theatre	Broadway
1997	How I Learned to Drive	Li'l Bit	Vineyard Theatre	Off-Broadway
1998	Communicating Doors	Poopay	Variety Arts Theatre	Off-Broadway
2000	Proof	Catherine Llewellyn	New York City Center Stage II	Off-Broadway
2000–2001	Proof	Catherine Llewellyn	Walter Kerr Theatre	Broadway
2004	Reckless	Rachel Fitzsimons	Samuel J. Friedman Theatre	Broadway
2008	Dead Man's Cell Phone	Jean	Playwrights Horizons	Off-Broadway
2009	Hedda Gabler	Hedda Tesman	American Airlines Theatre	Broadway
2013	The Snow Geese	Elizabeth Gaesling	Samuel J. Friedman Theatre	Broadway
2015	Heisenberg	Georgie Burns	New York City Center Stage II	Off-Broadway
2016	Heisenberg	Georgie Burns	Samuel J. Friedman Theatre	Broadway
2017	Heisenberg	Georgie Burns	Mark Taper Forum	Regional
2018	The Sound Inside	Bella Baird	Williamstown Theatre Festival	Regional
2019–2020	The Sound Inside	Bella Baird	Studio 54 Theatre	Broadway
2022	How I Learned to Drive	Li'l Bit	Samuel J. Friedman Theatre	Broadway
2026	The Oresteia	Montie	Bridge Theatre	Off West End

=== Audio ===
Year	Title	Role	Notes
2023	Murder in Bermuda	Beth Heller	6 episodes

=== Music videos ===
Year	Title	Artist
2023	"Honky Tonkin' About"	The Reklaws (featuring Drake Milligan)

== Awards and nominations ==
Organizations	Year	Category	Work	Result
Actor Awards	2003	Outstanding Actress in a Miniseries or Television Movie	Angels in America	Nominated
Actor Awards	2005	Outstanding Actress in a Comedy Series	Weeds (season one)	Nominated
Actor Awards	2006	Outstanding Actress in a Comedy Series	Weeds (season two)	Nominated
Actor Awards	2006	Outstanding Ensemble in a Comedy Series	Weeds (season two)	Nominated
Actor Awards	2007	Outstanding Actress in a Comedy Series	Weeds (season three)	Nominated
Actor Awards	2008	Outstanding Actress in a Comedy Series	Weeds (season four)	Nominated
Actor Awards	2008	Outstanding Ensemble in a Comedy Series	Weeds (season four)	Nominated
Drama Desk Awards	1990	Outstanding Actress in a Play	Prelude to a Kiss	Nominated
Drama Desk Awards	2001	Outstanding Actress in a Play	Proof	Won
Drama League Awards	2001	Distinguished Performance	Proof	Won
Genie Award	2000	Best Performance by an Actress in a Leading Role	The Five Senses	Nominated
Golden Globe Awards	2003	Best Supporting Actress – Series, Miniseries or Television Film	Angels in America	Won
Golden Globe Awards	2005	Best Actress – Television Series Musical or Comedy	Weeds (season one)	Won
Golden Globe Awards	2006	Best Actress – Television Series Musical or Comedy	Weeds (season two)	Nominated
Golden Globe Awards	2007	Best Actress – Television Series Musical or Comedy	Weeds (season three)	Nominated
Golden Globe Awards	2008	Best Actress – Television Series Musical or Comedy	Weeds (season four)	Nominated
Lucille Lortel Award	1997	Outstanding Lead Actress in a Play	How I Learned to Drive	Won
Lucille Lortel Award	2001	Outstanding Lead Actress in a Play	Proof	Won
Monte-Carlo Television Festival	2007	Outstanding Actress – Comedy Series	Weeds	Nominated
Obie Awards	1997	Distinguished Performance by an Actress	How I Learned to Drive	Won
Obie Awards	2001	Distinguished Performance by an Actress	Proof	Won
Outer Critics Circle Awards	2001	Outstanding Actress in a Play	Proof	Won
Outer Critics Circle Awards	2020	Outstanding Actress in a Play	The Sound Inside	Honoree
People's Choice Awards	2009	Choice TV Drama Diva	Weeds	Nominated
Primetime Emmy Awards	2002	Outstanding Supporting Actress in a Drama Series	The West Wing (episode: "The Women of Qumar")	Nominated
Primetime Emmy Awards	2004	Outstanding Supporting Actress in a Miniseries or Movie	Angels in America	Won
Primetime Emmy Awards	2007	Outstanding Lead Actress in a Miniseries or Movie	The Robber Bride	Nominated
Primetime Emmy Awards	2007	Outstanding Lead Actress in a Comedy Series	Weeds (episode: "Mrs. Botwin's Neighborhood")	Nominated
Primetime Emmy Awards	2008	Outstanding Lead Actress in a Comedy Series	Weeds (episode: "Bill Sussman")	Nominated
Primetime Emmy Awards	2009	Outstanding Lead Actress in a Comedy Series	Weeds (episode: "Lady's a Charm")	Nominated
Satellite Awards	2004	Best Supporting Actress – Series, Miniseries or Television Film	Angels in America	Nominated
Satellite Awards	2005	Best Actress – Television Series Musical or Comedy	Weeds	Won
Satellite Awards	2006	Best Actress – Television Series Musical or Comedy	Weeds	Nominated
Satellite Awards	2008	Best Actress – Television Series Musical or Comedy	Weeds	Nominated
Satellite Awards	2009	Best Actress – Television Series Musical or Comedy	Weeds	Nominated
Satellite Awards	2010	Best Actress – Motion Picture Musical or Comedy	Red	Nominated
Satellite Awards	2010	Best Actress – Television Series Musical or Comedy	Weeds	Nominated
Theatre World Awards	1990	—N/a	Prelude to a Kiss	Won
Tony Awards	1990	Best Actress in a Play	Prelude to a Kiss	Nominated
Tony Awards	2001	Best Actress in a Play	Proof	Won
Tony Awards	2005	Best Actress in a Play	Reckless	Nominated
Tony Awards	2020	Best Actress in a Play	The Sound Inside	Won
Tony Awards	2022	Best Actress in a Play	How I Learned to Drive	Nominated
