= Craig Lucas =

American playwright, screenwriter, theatre director, musical actor, and film director

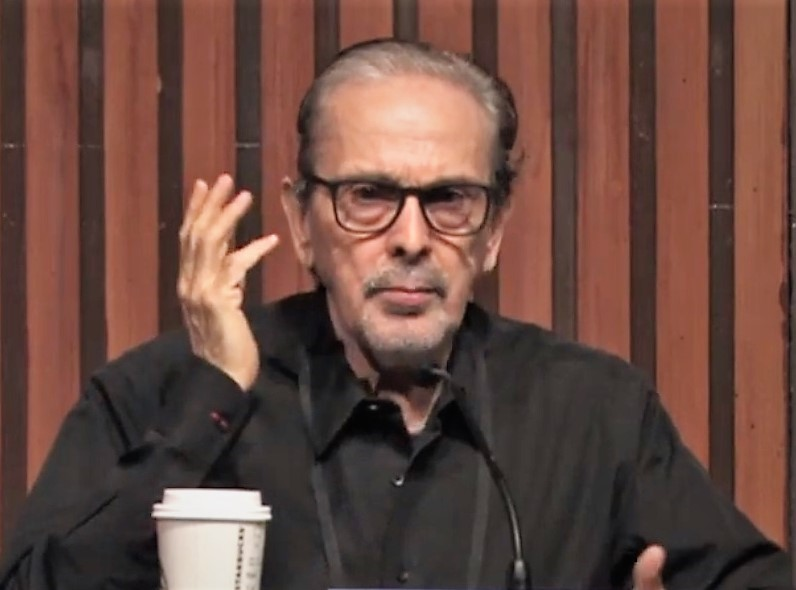
- Lucas in 2019
- Born: April 30, 1951 (age 75); Atlanta, Georgia, U.S.
- Education: Boston University (BFA)
- Occupations: Writer, actor, playwright, director
- Writing career
- Genres: Playwrighting, screenwriting

Craig Lucas (born April 30, 1951) is an American playwright, screenwriter, theatre director, musical actor, and film director.

== Biography ==
Born on April 30, 1951, he was found abandoned in a car in Atlanta, Georgia. Lucas was adopted when he was eight months old by a conservative Pennsylvania couple. His father was an FBI agent; his mother was a painter. She was born Jewish but suppressed the identity, which Lucas relates in his storytelling. He graduated in 1969 from Conestoga High School in Berwyn, Pennsylvania. In the 1960s and 1970s, Lucas became interested in the political left and discovered an attraction toward men. He is openly gay, and recalls that his coming out made it possible for him to develop as a playwright and as a person.

In 1973, Lucas left Boston University with a Bachelor of Arts in theatre and creative writing. His mentor Anne Sexton urged him to move to New York City to become a playwright. He worked in many day jobs while performing in Broadway musicals including Shenandoah, On the Twentieth Century, Rex, and Sweeney Todd. Stephen Sondheim later told him he was a better writer than actor.

Lucas met Norman René in 1979. Their first collaboration was Marry Me a Little in 1981. The two wrote a script incorporating songs that had been written for but discarded from Stephen Sondheim musicals, and René also directed. They followed this with the plays Missing Persons (1981) and Blue Window (1984); Three Postcards (1987), an original musical by Lucas and Craig Carnelia; and another play, Reckless (1983). In 1990, they had their biggest commercial and critical success with Prelude to a Kiss. They also collaborated for the feature film Longtime Companion (1990), the 1992 film adaptation of Prelude to a Kiss with Alec Baldwin and Meg Ryan, and the 1995 film version of Reckless with Mia Farrow and Mary-Louise Parker.

Following his early work on romantic comedies, Lucas began to write more serious works about AIDS, including The Singing Forest (not to be confused with the film of the same name) and The Dying Gaul, the latter of which was made into a film that Lucas also directed. Lucas also wrote the book for the musical The Light in the Piazza, and directed the world premiere at the Intiman Theater in Seattle. The Lincoln Center production, directed by Bartlett Sher, garnered him a Tony Award nomination.

Lucas has also directed plays such as Loot. He directed Birds of America, a film starring Matthew Perry and Hilary Swank, in 2007.

Lucas's play Prayer for My Enemy premiered Off-Broadway at Playwrights Horizons in December 2008. The production was directed by Lucas's frequent collaborator Bartlett Sher and featured Victoria Clark, Michele Pawk and Jonathan Groff. The play ran from November 14 (previews) through December 21.

In June 2013, Melbourne's Regent Theatre hosted the world premiere (and Broadway try-out) of King Kong, for which Lucas has provided the book with a score by Marius de Vries. As of 2014, Lucas is no longer involved with this musical.

Amélie, a musical based on the award-winning film of 2001, premiered at the Berkeley Repertory Theatre (Berkeley, California) In September 2015, with a book by Lucas, music by Daniel Messé (of Hem), lyrics by Nathan Tysen and Messé, and directed by Pam MacKinnon. The production had its pre-Broadway engagement at the Ahmanson Theatre in Los Angeles. It transferred to Broadway, starting previews on March 9, 2017, and closing on May 21, 2017, after 27 previews and 56 regular performances.

== Awards ==
In 2001 Lucas received an Obie Award for his direction of Harry Kondoleon's Saved or Destroyed at the Rattlestick Theater. He won the 2003 New York Film Critics Circle Award for Best Screenplay for The Secret Lives of Dentists. His Small Tragedy was awarded an Obie as Best American Play in 2004. Lucas's other awards include the Excellence in Literature Award from the American Academy of Arts and Letters; the PEN/Laura Pels Theater Award; and Outer Critics Circle, L.A. Drama Critics Circle, Drama-Logue and Lambda Literary Awards.

Fellowships include those from the Guggenheim and Rockefeller Foundations, the National Endowment for the Arts, and the Pew Charitable Trusts.

He has received the Tony Award nomination for the books of: An American in Paris (2015), Light in the Piazza (2005), Prelude to a Kiss, and Paradise Square (2022). He was nominated for the 1991 Pulitzer Prize for Drama for Prelude to a Kiss.

== Works ==
=== Broadway ===
==== As an actor ====
- Shenandoah (1975) – musical – actor
- Rex (1976) – musical – actor
- On the Twentieth Century (1978) – musical – actor
- Sweeney Todd (1979) – musical – actor

==== As a playwright ====
- Prelude to a Kiss (1990) – play – Tony Award Nomination for Best Play, Drama Desk Nomination for Outstanding New Play
- God's Heart (1997) – play
- Reckless (2004) – play
- The Light in the Piazza (2005) – musical – bookwriter – Tony Nomination for Best Book of a Musical
- Prelude to a Kiss (2007) – revival of a play
- An American in Paris (2014) – musical – bookwriter
- Amélie (2015) – musical – bookwriter
- Paradise Square (2022) — musical — bookwriter (with Christina Anderson, Marcus Gardley and Larry Kirwan) – Tony Nomination for Best Book of a Musical
- Days of Wine and Roses (2024) – musical – bookwriter

=== Off-Broadway ===
- Missing Persons (1981), revised (1995) – two-act play – produced Off-Off-Broadway, at Production Company
- Alec Wilder: Clues to a Life (adapted from Alec Wilder's Letters I Never Mailed) (1982) – two-act play
- Reckless (1983), revised (1988) – two-act play
- Blue Window (1984) – one-act play
- Boyfriend Riff
- If Columbus Does Not Figure in Your Travel Plans
- Bad Dream
- The Boom Box
- Grief
- Throwing Your Voice
- Unmemorable
- What I Meant Was
- Credo (1995)
- The Dying Gaul (1998) – play
- Stranger (2000) – play (Vineyard Theatre)
- This Thing of Darkness (2002) – play – (with David Schulner)
- Small Tragedy (2004) – play
- Miss Julie adaptation originally written by August Strindberg (2005), at the Rattlesticks Playwrights Theater
- I Was Most Alive With You (2018) - Playwrights Horizons
- Days of Wine and Roses (2023) - Atlantic Theatre Company

=== Regional ===
- Blue Window (1984) – play – George and Elizabeth Marton Award for Best New Play of 1984
- Three Postcards (1987) – musical – Premiered at South Coast Repertory in Costa Mesa, California
- Marry Me A Little (1988) – musical revue – Songs by Stephen Sondheim, conceived and developed by Craig Lucas and Norman René
- Prelude to a Kiss (1988) – play – Commissioned and premiered by South Coast Repertory in Costa Mesa, California
- God's Heart (1995) – play – produced at Trinity Repertory Company
- The Singing Forest (2004) – play – Premiered at the Intiman Theatre in Seattle, Washington.
- Prayer for My Enemy (2007) – play – Premiered at the Intiman Theatre in Seattle, Washington.
- Prelude to a Kiss (musical) (2024) - bookwriter

=== Films ===
- Longtime Companion (1990) – screenwriter
- Prelude to a Kiss (1992) – screenwriter
- Reckless (1995) – screenwriter
- The Secret Lives of Dentists (2002) – screenwriter
- The Dying Gaul (2005) – screenwriter/director
- Birds of America (2008) – director

=== Opera ===
- Two Boys 2011 – Libretto
- Orpheus in Love 1993 – Lyrics

=== Miscellaneous ===
- Savage Light, a play (with David Schulner) that was supposed to premiere at the Humana Festival of New American Plays, was deemed "too sexually explicit to stage".

== Sources ==
- Biography at Playbill Online
- Biography from the Intiman Theatre website
- Biography at the Encyclopedia of Gay, Lesbian, Transgender and Queer Culture.
- Cast Out: Queer Lives in Theater (U. Michigan Press, edited by Robin Bernstein) contains Lucas's essay "Making a Fresh Start."
