= Debra Monk =

American actress (born 1949)

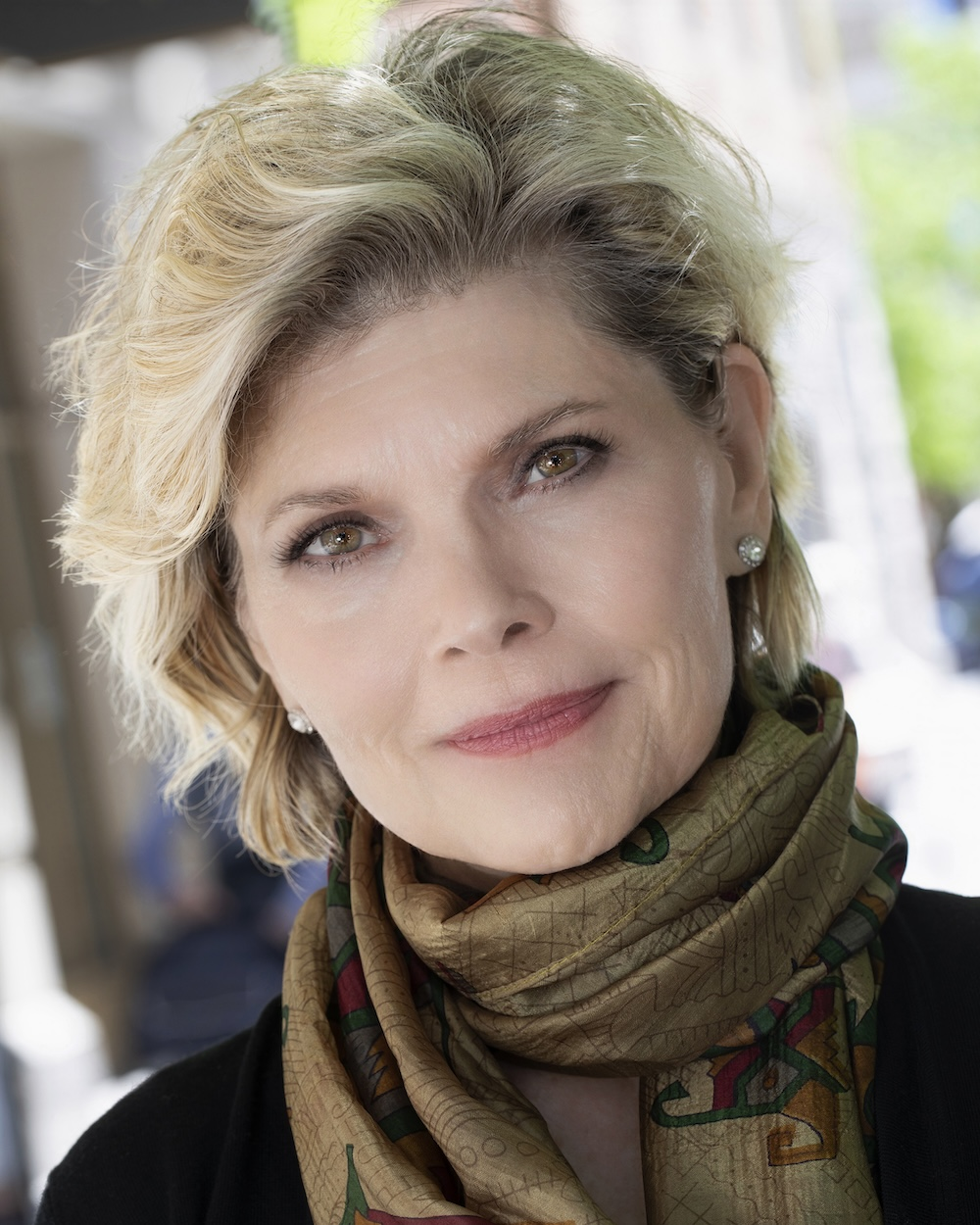
- Monk in 2022. Photo by Tess Steinkolk.
- Born: February 27, 1949 (age 77); Middletown, Ohio, U.S.
- Education: Frostburg State University (BA); Southern Methodist University (MFA)
- Occupations: Actress; singer; writer
- Years active: 1982–present

Debra Monk (born February 27, 1949) is an American actress, singer, and writer, best known for her performances on the Broadway stage. She is the recipient of a Tony Award (1993), two Drama Desk Awards (1988, 2007), the Helen Hayes Award (1994), the Obie Award (2000) and an Emmy Award (1999) for her work.

== Life and career ==
Monk was born in Middletown, Ohio on February 27, 1949. She was voted "Best Personality" by her graduating class at Wheaton High School in Silver Spring, Maryland. In 1973, she graduated from Frostburg State University. In 1975, Monk was awarded a Master of Fine Arts from Southern Methodist University in Dallas.

Monk garnered first attention in theatrical circles as one of the co-writers and co-stars of the musical Pump Boys and Dinettes (1982). She won the Tony Award for Best Featured Actress in a Play for performance in Redwood Curtain (1993). She was nominated for a Tony Award for roles in Picnic (1994), Steel Pier (1997), and Curtains (2007). In 2000, she won an Obie Award for The Time of the Cuckoo. She returned to the stage in Steppenwolf Theatre Company's production of Visiting Edna by David Rabe in September 2016.

Monk appeared on the Food Channel cooking show Barefoot Contessa, where she cooked Roasted Chicken, Arugula and Bread Salad, and Tri-Berry Crumble.

Monk has appeared in over 30 films since the early 1990s. She made her film debut in the movie version of Prelude to a Kiss, playing Aunt Dorothy. She later appeared in The Bridges of Madison County (1995) and The Devil's Advocate (1997). On television, she has won a Primetime Emmy Award for Outstanding Guest Actress in a Drama Series for a recurring role as Katie Sipowicz in the ABC series, NYPD Blue. She also guest-starred on Law & Order, Desperate Housewives, The Closer, and Girls. Monk had recurring roles in A Nero Wolfe Mystery (2001–02), Grey's Anatomy (2006–11), and Damages (2007–12).

== Filmography ==
=== Film ===
Year	Title	Role	Notes
1992	Prelude to a Kiss	Aunt Dorothy	
1993	For Love or Money	Mrs. Wegman	
1993	Fearless	Alison	
1994	Quiz Show	Kintner's Secretary	
1995	Redwood Curtain	Geneva	Television film
1995	The Bridges of Madison County	Madge	
1995	Jeffrey	Mom	
1995	Reckless	Therapist	
1996	Bed of Roses	Mrs. Farrell	
1996	Mrs. Winterbourne	Lieutenant Ambrose	
1996	The Substance of Fire	Martha Hackett	
1996	The First Wives Club	Jilted Lover	
1996	Extreme Measures	Dr. Judith Gruszynski	
1997	KnitWits	Catherine	Short film
1997	In & Out	Mrs. Lester	
1997	The Devil's Advocate	Pam Garrety	
1997	Ellen Foster	Aunt Nadine	Television film
1998	Bulworth	Helen	
2000	Center Stage	Nancy	
2003	Briar Patch	Officer Avon	
2003	The Music Man	Mrs. Paroo	Television film
2003	Milwaukee, Minnesota	Edna Burroughs	
2003	Eloise at the Plaza	Maggie	Television film
2003	Eloise at Christmastime	Maggie	Television film
2004	Palindromes	Mama Sunshine	
2005	Dark Water	Dahlia's Teacher	
2005	The Producers	Lick Me-Bite Me	
2007	The Savages	Nancy Lachman	
2008	The Great Buck Howard	Doreen	
2009	Love and Other Impossible Pursuits	Laura	
2011	Good Luck Charlie, It's Christmas!	Petunia	Television film
2012	One for the Money	Mrs. Plum	
2012	The Brass Teapot	Trudy	
2013	Ass Backwards	Pawn Shop Owner	
2013	Reaching Home	Janet	Short film
2014	This Is Where I Leave You	Linda	
2015	Demolition	Davis' Mom	
2019	Standing Up, Falling Down	Jeanie Rollins	

=== Television ===
Year	Title	Role	Notes
1989	One Life to Live	Nurse Medford	1 Episode
1990	American Playhouse	Psychiatrist	Episode: "Women & Wallace "
1992	Loving	Sandra Thorpe	1 episode
1992	Lifestories: Families in Crisis	Karen Bell	Episode:"Public Law 106: The Becky Bell Story "
1994	Law & Order	Kathleen O'Brien	Episode: "Coma"
1996–2001	NYPD Blue	Katie Sipowicz	17 episodes (1999 – Primetime Emmy Award for Outstanding Guest Actress in a Drama Series)
1998	Dellaventura	Madison Harcourt	Episode: "Made in America"
1998	LateLine	Clare Cunningham	Episode: "Requiem for a Horse"
2001–02	A Nero Wolfe Mystery	Various roles	8 episodes
2002	Law & Order	Dr. Madelyn Stahl	Episode: "Born Again"
2003	The Wonderful World of Disney	Maggie	2 episodes
2003	Frasier	Nurse Karen	Episode: "No Sex Please We're Skittish"
2005	Law & Order	Judge G. Proctor	Episode: "In God We Trust"
2006–11	Grey's Anatomy	Louise O'Malley	7 episodes
2006	Desperate Housewives	Marcella	Episode: "Children and Art"
2007–12	Damages	Denise Parsons	12 episodes
2007	Notes from the Underbelly	Andrew's Mom	Episode: "Mother's Milk "
2007	Law & Order: Criminal Intent	Warden Pellis	Episode: "Untethered "
2009	Glee	Mrs. Schuester	Episode: "Acafellas"
2009	The Closer	Mary Summer	Episode: "Blood Money "
2009	Ghost Whisperer	Anne Sullivan	Episode: "Till Death Do Us Start "
2010	Brothers & Sisters	Alexandra Kirby	Episode: "Call Mom"
2012	White Collar	Mrs. Mitchell	Episode: "Pulling Strings"
2014	Girls	Dr. Stern	2 episodes
2014	Hot in Cleveland	Loretta	Episode: "Win Win"
2014–18	Mozart in the Jungle	Betty Cragdale	26 episodes
2014	Reckless	Judge Gertrude Moss	5 episodes
2015	Madam Secretary	Mary Lou Boris	Episode: "The Ninth Circle"
2015	The Jack and Triumph Show	Young June	2 episodes
2015	Difficult People	Bunny Tack	Episode: "Difficult Christmas"
2015	Blindspot	Colonel Powers	Episode: "A Stray Howl"
2015–17	Sneaky Pete	Connie Persikof	2 episodes
2016–17	Mercy Street	Dr. Foster's Mother	2 episodes
2016	Crowded	Linda	Episode: "Come Back"
2016	The Good Wife	Tracy Mintz	Episode: "Judged"
2016	The Characters	Kim	Episode: "John Early "
2017	Barefoot Contessa: Back to Basics	Herself	Episode: “Dinner Party 101”
2017	NCIS: New Orleans	CEO Sarah Laroche	Episode: “Hell on the High Water”
2017	Mr. Mercedes	Capt. Brooke Hockney	2 episodes
2018	Dietland	Mrs Kettle	5 episodes
2018–19	Tell Me a Story	Esther Thorn	4 episodes
2019	At Home with Amy Sedaris	Mrs. Bjornson	Episode: “Thanksgiving”
2019	Instinct	Judge Gillespie	Episode: “Finders Keepers”
2019–23	New Amsterdam	Karen Brantley	16 episodes
2022	The Gilded Age	Armstrong	Series Regular (2023 – Screen Actors Guild Award for Outstanding Performance by an Ensemble in a Drama Series nomination)
2023	American Horror Story: Delicate	Virginia Harding	4 episodes

== Stage ==
=== Broadway ===
- Pump Boys and Dinettes - 1982 (also co-author and co-director)
- Prelude to a Kiss - 1990
- Nick & Nora - 1991
- Redwood Curtain - 1993 - Tony Award
- Picnic - 1994 - Tony Award nomination
- Company - 1995
- Steel Pier - 1997 - Tony Award nomination
- Ah, Wilderness! - 1998
- Thou Shalt Not - 2001
- Chicago - 2005
- Curtains - 2007 - Tony Award nomination
- Cat on a Hot Tin Roof - 2012

=== Off-Broadway ===
- The Time of the Cuckoo - Obie Award
- Ancestral Voices
- The Seagull
- Death Defying Acts - 1995
- Three Hotels - 1993
- Oil City Symphony - 1986 (co-author, Drama Desk Award)
- Assassins - 1990
