= The Way We Live Now (film) =

1970 film by Barry Brown

The Way We Live Now is a 1970 film directed by Barry Brown and based on Warren Miller's novel.

== Plot ==
An advertisement executive has a problem trying to leave the family and make an affair.

== Cast ==
- Nicholas Pryor - Lionel Aldridge
- Joanna Miles - Amelia
- Lois Smith - Jane Aldridge
- Sydney Walker - Lincoln
- Linda Blair - Sara Aldridge
- Samantha Jones - Samantha

== See also ==
- List of American films of 1970
