= Prelude to a Kiss (play) =

1988 play by Craig Lucas

- Original language: English
- Written by: Craig Lucas
- Genre: Romantic Comedy

Premiere
- Date: 1988
- Place: South Coast Repertory

Prelude to a Kiss is a 1988 play by Craig Lucas. The play, with a runtime of roughly 70 minutes, tells the story of Peter and Rita, a couple that falls in love despite the woman's pessimistic fear of the world. Shortly after their wedding, a supernatural event tests the strength of their love and commitment to each other. When it premiered, it was considered by many critics to be an allegory for couples affected by the AIDS crisis.

A preview version of the play premiered on January 15, 1988, at South Coast Repertory in Costa Mesa, California, directed by Norman René. Following this, the play was revised and made its official debut on March 14, 1990, in New York City. The revised, official version was directed by Réné, with Alec Baldwin and Mary-Louise Parker as Peter and Rita. The title is taken from the 1938 torch song of the same title by Duke Ellington.

The play was later adapted into a 1992 film of the same title. Lucas adapted the play into a screenplay himself, and the play's original director Norman René. Alec Baldwin returned to play the role of Peter for the film, while Rita was played by Meg Ryan.

== Plot synopsis ==
Peter is a self-conscious employee at a publishing firm who attends a party. There he meets Rita, a seemingly carefree part-time bartender who hopes to be a graphic designer. The two realize a mutual attraction and begin dating. Over time, Rita reveals her fears about the world, and her hesitancy to invest in joy or dreams when she expects bad things are more likely to happen than good. Despite this, she falls in love with Peter and agrees to marry him.

Some time later, the two marry. At their wedding reception, they encounter an unknown Old Man who was passing by and wanted to wish the couple good luck. The Old Man asks to kiss the bride before he leaves and Rita agrees, charmed. As they kiss, Rita and the Old Man magically exchange bodies. Confused and disoriented, Rita wanders away, now inhabiting an elderly male form, while "Rita" and Peter embark on a honeymoon in Jamaica. During the trip, Peter is confused by his wife's new personality and inability to remember basic details of her own life. When they return home, "Rita" seems back to her old self and kisses Peter. After the kiss, Peter realizes this isn't his wife and concludes the impostor read Rita's diary to better masquerade as her. Panicked, he demands her return then leaves the apartment.

At the bar where Rita worked, Peter sees the Old Man from the wedding reception. They talk and Peter realizes this is the real Rita, who has been living as the Old Man (whose name is Julius). They hope to make another body swap, but discover the Old Man has fled to stay with Rita's parents the Boyles, telling them the marriage is in turmoil and separation is needed. Peter meets Leah, Julius's daughter, and learns the Old Man is a retired widower who has terminal cancer, with maybe a year left to live. As they consider what to do, Peter and Rita live together as a couple again. Rita now appreciates life more deeply, while Peter realizes he loves her despite the shell she inhabits changing how they relate physically.

Peter and Rita finally confront Julius, but the Old Man himself isn't sure how to cause the body swap. He came upon their wedding by chance and envied the bride's youth due to his fear of dying. Rita realizes that during their kiss, she had felt envy for the Old Man as well, wishing she could be someone who had already survived into old age despite any obstacles. As the two realize they no longer have the fears they felt that day, Rita and Julius exchange souls again. Julius takes his leave as Rita and Peter reunite.

== Notable casts ==
Character	South Coast Rep (1988)	Off-Broadway (1990)	Broadway (1990)	Broadway Revival (2007)
Rita Boyle	Lisa Zane	Mary-Louise Parker	Mary-Louise Parker	Annie Parisse
Peter Hoskins	Mark Arnott	Alec Baldwin	Timothy Hutton	Alan Tudyk
Julius Blier (Old Man)	Frank Hamilton	Barnard Hughes	Barnard Hughes	John Mahoney
Mrs. Boyle	Teri Ralston	Debra Monk	Debra Monk	Robin Bartlett
Mr. Boyle	Hal Landon Jr.	Larry Bryggman	Larry Bryggman	James Rebhorn
Leah Blier	Mary Anne McGarry	Joyce Reehling	Joyce Reehling	Marceline Hugot
Taylor	Michael Canavan	John Dossett	John Dossett	Matthew Rauch

== Dramatic analysis ==
Critic Frank Rich wrote: "...this play can be taken as an indirect treatment of [AIDS]. The epidemic is to Mr. Lucas what Babi Yar was to D. M. Thomas, and Peter's fidelity to his true love's soul is transparent. Critic James Hebert wrote: "When it premiered in 1990 it was widely presumed to be an oblique response to the ravages of AIDS. Long removed from that time, it becomes a broader commentary on eternal topics like the limits of love and the meaning of commitment."

== Productions ==
The play was commissioned and originally staged by South Coast Repertory, Costa Mesa, California in January 1988. After revisions to the script and direction, the official version opened off-Broadway at Circle Repertory Company on March 14, 1990 (February 20 previews) starring Alec Baldwin, Mary-Louise Parker, Debra Monk, L. Peter Callender, Craig Bockhorn, Michael Warren Powell and John Dossett, and directed by Norman René, who had directed at South Coast Repertory.

After receiving rave reviews, the production moved to the Helen Hayes Theatre on Broadway, on May 1, 1990, with Timothy Hutton replacing Baldwin. Other cast members included Barnard Hughes, Debra Monk, John Dossett, and Larry Bryggman. The play closed on May 19, 1991, after 440 performances, received a Tony Award nomination as Best Play, and was a finalist for the Pulitzer Prize for Drama.

A revival was produced in 2003 at the Pacific Resident Theatre in Venice, California.

A revival opened on Broadway at the American Airlines Theatre on March 8, 2007, produced by the Roundabout Theatre Company. Alan Tudyk, Annie Parisse and John Mahoney starred in the lead roles. The show was directed by Daniel Sullivan with original music by John Gromada, scenery by Santo Loquasto, costumes by Jane Greenwood, and lighting by Donald Holder.

A film version came out in 1992 starring Alec Baldwin and Meg Ryan.

== Stage musical adaptation ==
A musical stage adaptation of the story, with a book by Craig Lucas and music by Daniel Messé with lyrics by Messé and Sean Hartley debuted at South Coast Repertory in 2024. The show had been in development since 2016.

== Awards and nominations ==
=== Original Broadway production ===
Year	Award	Category	Nominee	Result
1990	Tony Award	Best Play		Nominated
1990	Tony Award	Best Actress in a Play	Mary-Louise Parker	Nominated
1990	Tony Award	Best Direction of a Play	Norman Rene	Nominated
1990	Drama Desk Award	Outstanding Play		Nominated
1990	Drama Desk Award	Outstanding Actress in a Play	Mary-Louise Parker	Nominated
1990	Drama Desk Award	Outstanding Director of a Play	Norman Rene	Nominated
1990	Theatre World Award		Mary-Louise Parker	Won
