= Prelude to a Kiss (film) =

1992 film

- Original poster
- Directed by: Norman René
- Written by: Craig Lucas
- Based on: Prelude to a Kiss by Craig Lucas
- Produced by: Michael Gruskoff; Michael I. Levy
- Starring: Alec Baldwin; Meg Ryan; Kathy Bates; Ned Beatty; Patty Duke; Sydney Walker
- Cinematography: Stefan Czapsky
- Edited by: Stephen A. Rotter
- Music by: Howard Shore
- Production company: Gruskoff/Levy Company
- Distributed by: 20th Century Fox
- Release date: July 10, 1992
- Running time: 105 minutes
- Country: United States
- Language: English
- Box office: $22.7 million

Prelude to a Kiss is a 1992 American romantic fantasy film directed by Norman René and starring Alec Baldwin, Meg Ryan, and Sydney Walker. The movie follows a conservative man, Peter (Baldwin), and a liberal woman, Rita (Ryan), falling in love. On their wedding day, Rita (who fears life's uncertainties and is cynical of the world) is kissed by an elderly stranger named Julius (Walker), causing their souls to switch places. Peter realizes the change and reunites with Rita, now in the form of an elderly man. While trying to figure out how to restore his wife, Peter tries to connect with Rita despite her new form.

The movie is based on the 1988 play of the same title that was also directed by Norman René and written by playwright Craig Lucas, who adapted the film's screenplay. Alec Baldwin and Debra Monk were part of the cast in the play's worldwide premiere in New York City as well as the film cast, though while Baldwin reprised the same part, Monk played a new role. The title is taken from the 1938 torch song of the same title by Duke Ellington. Regarding the movie's story, critic James Hebert wrote: "When it [the play] premiered in 1990, it was widely presumed to be an oblique response to the ravages of AIDS. Long removed from that time, it becomes a broader commentary on eternal topics like the limits of love and the meaning of commitment."

== Plot ==
Peter Hoskins, a conservative and self-conscious employee of a Chicago publishing house, attends a party. He meets Rita Boyle, a liberal, seemingly free-spirited part-time bartender who wants to be a graphic designer. They begin a relationship and fall in love. Peter finds himself experiencing greater confidence and optimism with Rita. Falling in love with him, Rita reveals her carefree attitude hides a pessimistic fear of the world. She is afraid to invest too much joy in life when things can go wrong and people can be cruel. For these reasons, she refuses to be a mother and bring children into an unjust world.

On their wedding day, minutes after taking their vows, Rita and Peter are approached by Julius Blier, an elderly man who requests a kiss with the bride. Charmed, Rita agrees. As they kiss, their spirits switch places. Now in an elderly body, a confused and disoriented Rita wanders off, eventually going to the address on Julius's ID. "Rita" and Peter leave for their honeymoon in Jamaica. Peter realizes his wife's personality and knowledge have changed, a suspicion cemented when "Rita" eagerly suggests they have children together. After they return home, "Rita" seems back to her old self. When they kiss, Peter is certain this is an impostor, realizing this person simply read Rita's diary to improve the masquerade.

Peter goes to the bar where Rita worked, finding the old man Julius. A conversation confirms "Julius" is the real Rita. Peter hopes to switch their souls again, but discovers Julius/"Rita" has left to stay with her parents, the Boyles, telling them there are problems with the marriage and separation is needed. They refuse to let Peter see "Rita", taking her in.

Meeting Julius's daughter Leah, Peter learns the elderly man's wife died, and he now has terminal cancer and only a year to live. While trying to figure out what to do next, Rita and Peter live together, attempting to adjust to their new situation. The entire experience leads Rita to conclude life is precious and its finitude can be appreciated rather than feared. Peter, who wondered how he could stay married when he is no longer sexually attracted to his wife, now sees beyond the physical shell and realizes he truly loves the soul within. Meanwhile, the novelty has worn off of Julius's experiences and obligations of Rita's life; he misses his family and independence.

Peter convinces Rita's mother to bring "Rita" to him, saying he wants to fix the marriage. Sympathizing, Mrs. Boyle does so, leaving them alone. Rita and Peter then attempt to force a soul switch again, but Julius admits he does not know how it happened in the first place. He came across their wedding while wandering and found himself envious of the bride's youth, as he greatly feared dying. Rita realizes she and Julius both experienced fear and envy at the same moment. While he wanted to be young again, Rita saw him and envied him being an old person who had already survived any obstacle life might create. As Julius and Rita realize they no longer have the fears and envy they experienced that day, they magically return to their rightful bodies. Julius says goodbye as Rita and Peter determine to never take each other for granted and cherish their time together.

== Cast ==
- Alec Baldwin as Peter Hoskins
- Meg Ryan as Rita Boyle
- Sydney Walker as Julius Blier
- Kathy Bates as Leah Blier
- Ned Beatty as Dr. Boyle
- Patty Duke as Mrs. Boyle
- Stanley Tucci as Taylor
- Richard Riehle as Jerry Blier
- Rocky Carroll as Tom
- Debra Monk as Aunt Dorothy
- Ray Gill as Uncle Fred
- Fern Persons as Elderly Woman
- Annie Golden as Tin Market Musician
- Mary Spaeth as Palm Reader

== Production ==
The film's title is derived from the Duke Ellington/Irving Gordon/Irving Mills tune of the same name, which is heard performed by Deborah Harry during the opening credits. The soundtrack also includes the Cole Porter song "Every Time We Say Goodbye" performed by Annie Lennox, "The More I See You" and "I Had the Craziest Dream" by Harry Warren and Mack Gordon, "A Certain Smile" by Sammy Fain and Paul Francis Webster, "The Very Thought of You" by Ray Noble, "Sweet Jane" by Cowboy Junkies, and "Someone Like You" by Van Morrison. In the beginning, Rita dances to the song "I Touch Myself" by Divinyls.

== Reception ==
=== Box office ===
The film grossed $20,006,730 in the United States and $2,690,961 internationally for a total worldwide box office of $22,697,691.

=== Critical response ===
The film received mixed reviews from critics. Rotten Tomatoes compiled reviews retrospectively to give it a score of 63% based on 27 reviews.

In his review in The New York Times, Vincent Canby said, "The sad news about this movie adaptation is that it functions as a cruel critique of the problems that, for whatever reason, did not seem important in the stage production. This Prelude to a Kiss is not only without charm and wit, but it's also clumsily set forth: many people seeing it may wonder what, in heaven's name, is going on. The opened-up film lumbers like someone on crutches. Against the literal surroundings of Chicago, the North Shore and Jamaica, Peter, Rita and Julius become perfunctory characters, interesting only for the bizarre situation in which they are caught. They lack any convincing particularity or idiosyncrasy. The same dialogue that served well enough on the stage now sounds arch and coy or metaphysically flat."

Roger Ebert of the Chicago Sun-Times said of the film, "[A]lthough it could probably do more with its story, what it does is gentle and moving. The film is fairly hard to categorize, which is one of its strengths. Of the dialogue, I'll say how unusual it is for Hollywood characters to talk longingly and thoughtfully about our search for happiness in this world where most assuredly we will die. Prelude to a Kiss is the kind of movie that can inspire long conversations about the only subject really worth talking about, the meaning of it all. The emotional heart of the movie belongs to the old guy, Walker, a New York stage actor who got his first starring role at 71. He is wonderful here. He begins as a block of human wood, an old man who looks as if he has not one single thing to say, and then he develops eloquently into a person of poetry and longing. He is, in many of his scenes, literally playing a woman in her 20s. How he does it – how he gets away with it – is through not just craft, but heart."

In Rolling Stone, Peter Travers stated, "Craig Lucas's prince of a play has been turned into a toad of a movie. The disappointment is rending, since Lucas and director Norman René made magic onstage. The play challenges us to make an imaginative leap into the wild blue. The film, however much it flails, stays resolutely earthbound."

Owen Gleiberman of Entertainment Weekly graded the film C− and added, "Why is Prelude to a Kiss such a washout? I'm afraid it's because the play itself is a whimsically inept piece of high kitsch – a Twilight Zone for yuppie soft-heads. The characters aren't fleshed out as human beings; they seem like urban types concocted in screenwriting class. And so the ethereality of the premise never takes hold."

In Variety, Todd McCarthy wrote, "Thanks to a magnetic cast and intelligent adaptation, Prelude to a Kiss has made a solid transfer from stage to screen. Back in the 1930s or '40s, this sort of sophisticated, literary-oriented treatment of a simple romantic idea would have been the norm. Today's general audiences, however, may be put off by the quick-witted talk and mildly confused by the central device, despite its resemblance to Ghost ... Baldwin and Ryan make such a winning pair. Looking great and playing a normal guy whose optimism has prevailed over his troubled past, Baldwin is a romantic lead both men and women can enjoy watching. Cuter-than-cute, almost too adorable for words, Ryan rambunctiously embodies the life force even when playing a basically aimless young woman, and the film suffers during her prolonged absence in the later stages."

Rita Kempley of The Washington Post said, "Packed with cheap sentiment and puerile romanticism, Prelude to a Kiss oozes sugarcoated comfort as might a drugstore valentine crushed enthusiastically to the recipient's heaving bosom. A faithful adaptation of Craig Lucas's popular play, it proves a feast for love gourmands, especially those with an appetite for body-swapping. The less starry-eyed viewers will remain starved for the comparative profundity of a leaky Love Boat rerun."

=== Accolades ===
The film is recognized by American Film Institute in these lists:

- 2002: AFI's 100 Years...100 Passions – Nominated
