= 75th Tony Awards =

2022 US theatrical awards ceremony

- Date: June 12, 2022
- Venue: Radio City Music Hall
- Hosted by: Ariana DeBose; Darren Criss and Julianne Hough (preshow)

Highlights
- Most wins: Company and The Lehman Trilogy (5)
- Most nominations: A Strange Loop (11)
- Website: tonyawards.com

Television/radio coverage
- Network: CBS; Paramount+
- Viewership: 3.9 million
- Produced by: Ricky Kirshner; Glenn Weiss
- Directed by: Glenn Weiss

The 75th Tony Awards were held on June 12, 2022, to recognize achievement in Broadway productions during the 2021–22 season. The ceremony was held at Radio City Music Hall in New York City, with Ariana DeBose serving as host of the main ceremony, and Darren Criss and Julianne Hough co-hosting a streaming pre-show.

The most-awarded productions of the season were the new play The Lehman Trilogy, which won five awards, including Best Play, and the revival of Stephen Sondheim's musical Company, which also won five awards, including Best Revival of a Musical. The Pulitzer Prize-winning musical A Strange Loop was the most-nominated show of the season, with 11 nominations, and won Best Musical, becoming the first Best Musical winner to win only two awards total since 42nd Street (1981).

With her nomination for Best Featured Actress in a Musical in A Strange Loop, L Morgan Lee became the first openly transgender person to be nominated for a Tony. Additionally, with her win as a lead producer of A Strange Loop, Jennifer Hudson became the 17th person to win the EGOT in their entertainment career.

== Ceremony information ==
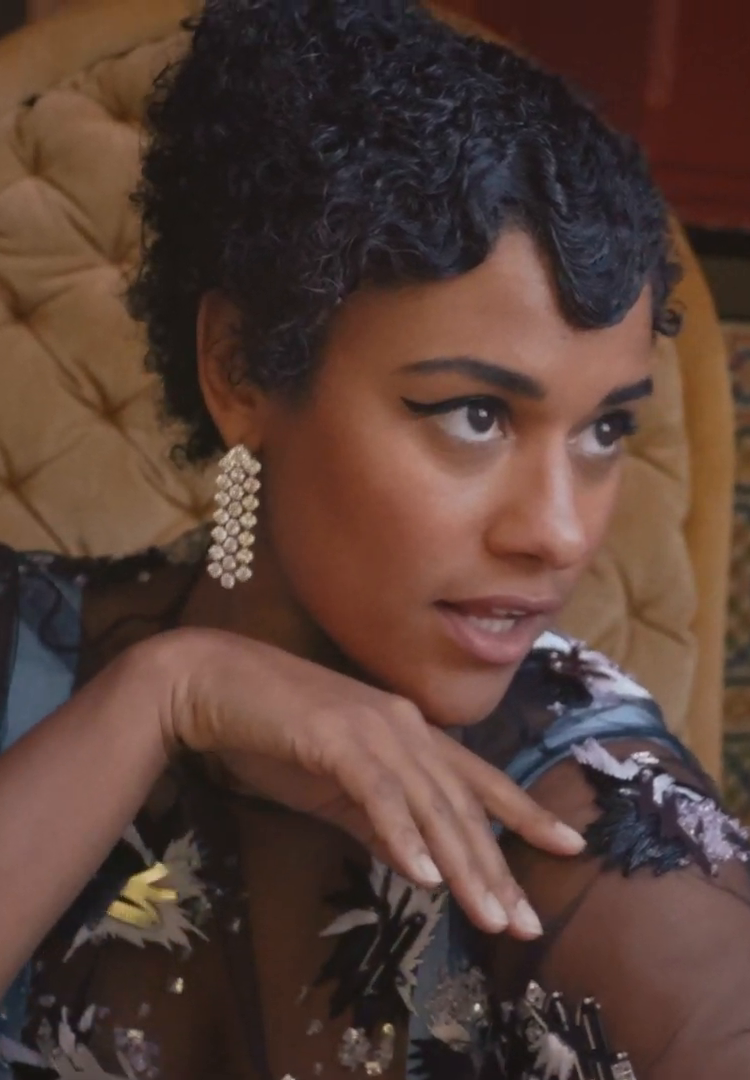
Ariana DeBose hosted the ceremony.

Returning to its usual June scheduling, the ceremony's telecast was split between Paramount+ and CBS. Paramount+ streamed an hour-long pre-show, The Tony Awards: Act One, which was hosted by Darren Criss and Julianne Hough and featured "special performances" and the presentation of selected awards. It was followed by the main ceremony telecast on CBS and Paramount+, which was hosted by Ariana DeBose. For the first time, the ceremony was televised live nationally.

== Eligibility ==
The Tony Awards eligibility cut-off date for the 2021–22 season was May 4, 2022 for all Broadway productions which meet all other eligibility requirements. Nominations for the 2022 Tony Awards were announced by Adrienne Warren and Joshua Henry on May 9, 2022. They were initially going to be announced on May 3, but were extended a week to accommodate possible COVID-19 outbreaks. A revival of West Side Story that opened on February 20, 2020 was considered ineligible for the 74th Tony Awards because too few nominators and voters had seen it before Broadway shut down on March 12, 2020 due to the pandemic, and it did not resume when Broadway reopened in September 2021.

34 shows were eligible. All eligible shows are below.

Original plays

- Birthday Candles
- Chicken & Biscuits
- Clyde's
- Dana H.
- Hangmen
- Is This a Room
- Pass Over
- POTUS: Or, Behind Every Great Dumbass Are
  Seven Women Trying to Keep Him Alive
- Skeleton Crew
- The Lehman Trilogy
- The Minutes
- Thoughts of a Colored Man

Original musicals

- A Strange Loop
- Diana
- Flying Over Sunset
- Girl from the North Country
- MJ
- Mr. Saturday Night
- Mrs. Doubtfire
- Paradise Square
- Six

Play revivals

- American Buffalo
- for colored girls who have considered
  suicide / when the rainbow is enuf
- How I Learned to Drive
- Lackawanna Blues
- Macbeth
- Plaza Suite
- Take Me Out
- The Skin of Our Teeth
- Trouble in Mind

Musical revivals

- Caroline, or Change
- Company
- Funny Girl
- The Music Man

== Winners and nominees ==
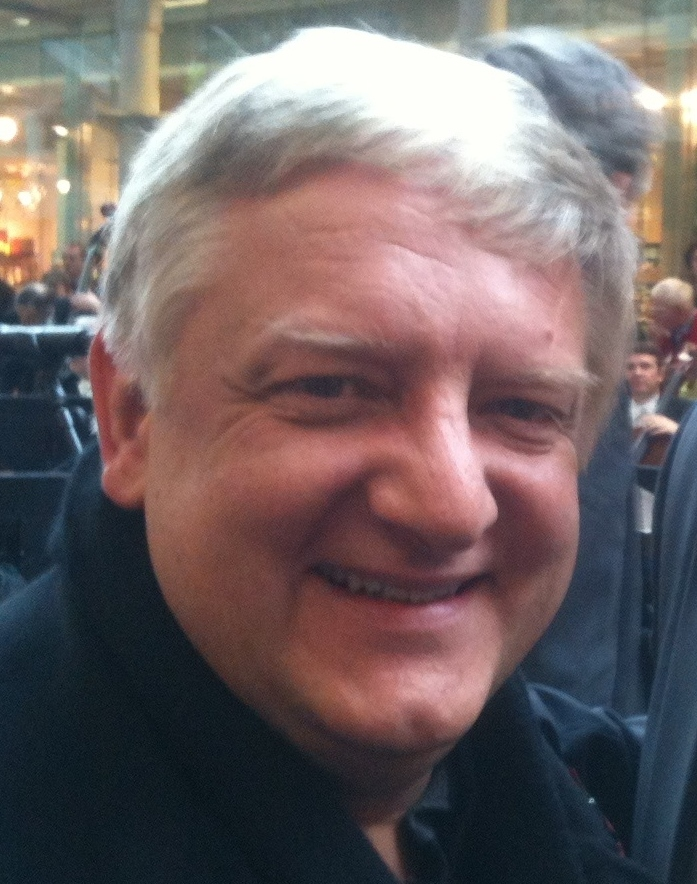
Simon Russell Beale, Best Performance by a Leading Actor in a Play winner

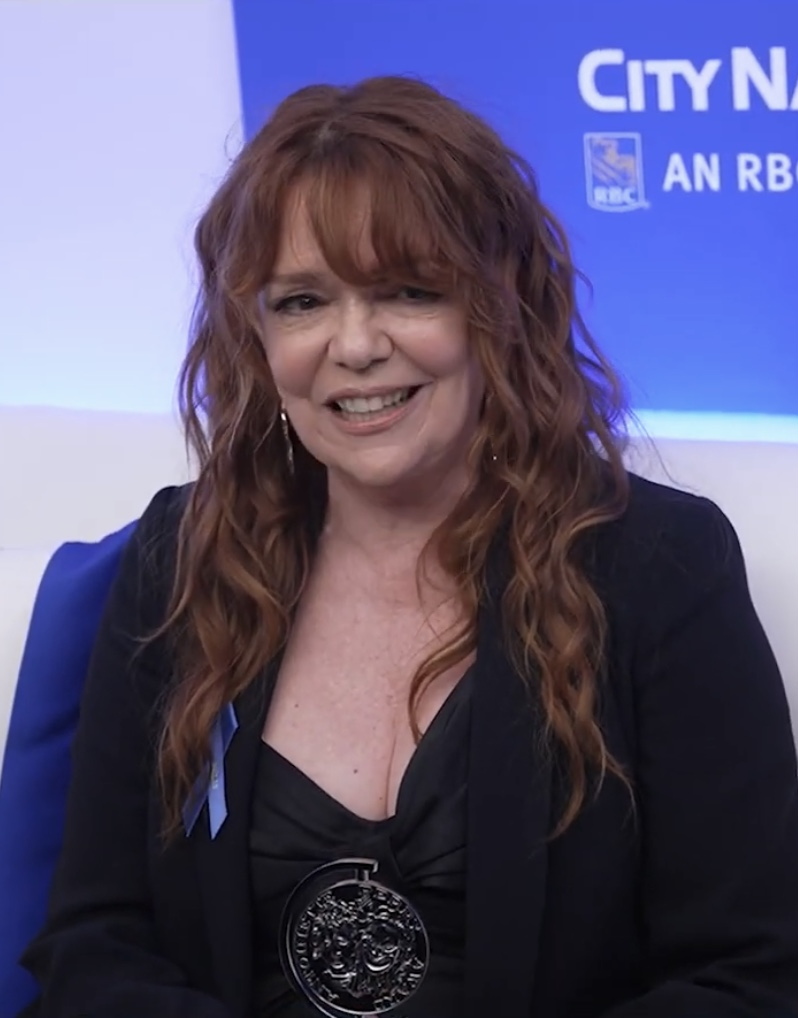
Deirdre O'Connell, Best Performance by a Leading Actress in a Play winner

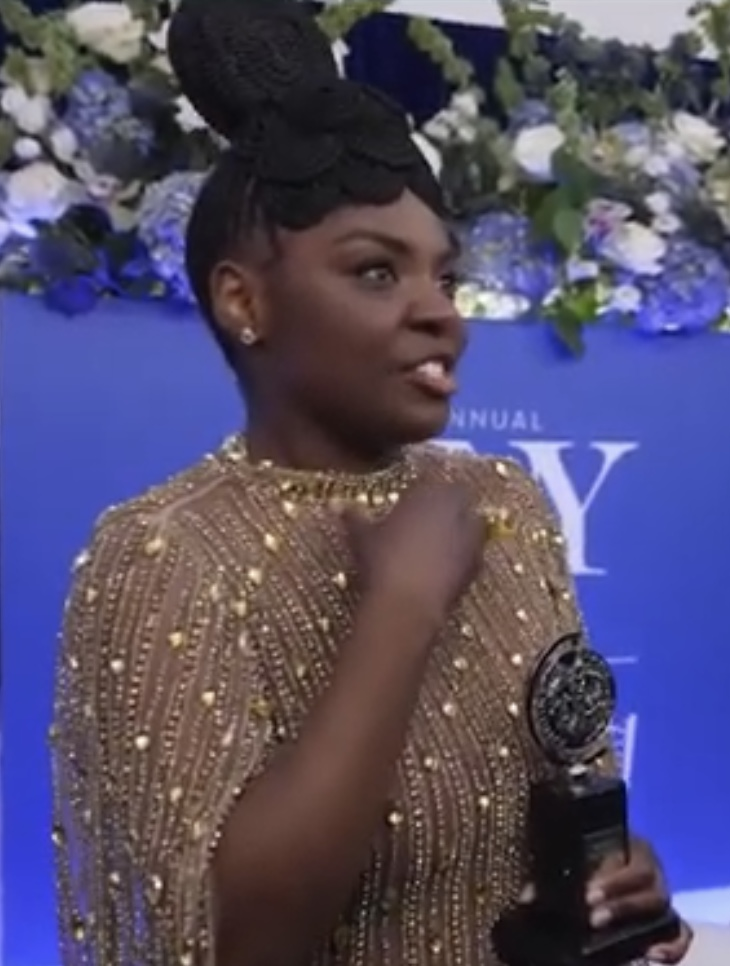
Joaquina Kalukango, Best Performance by a Leading Actress in a Musical winner

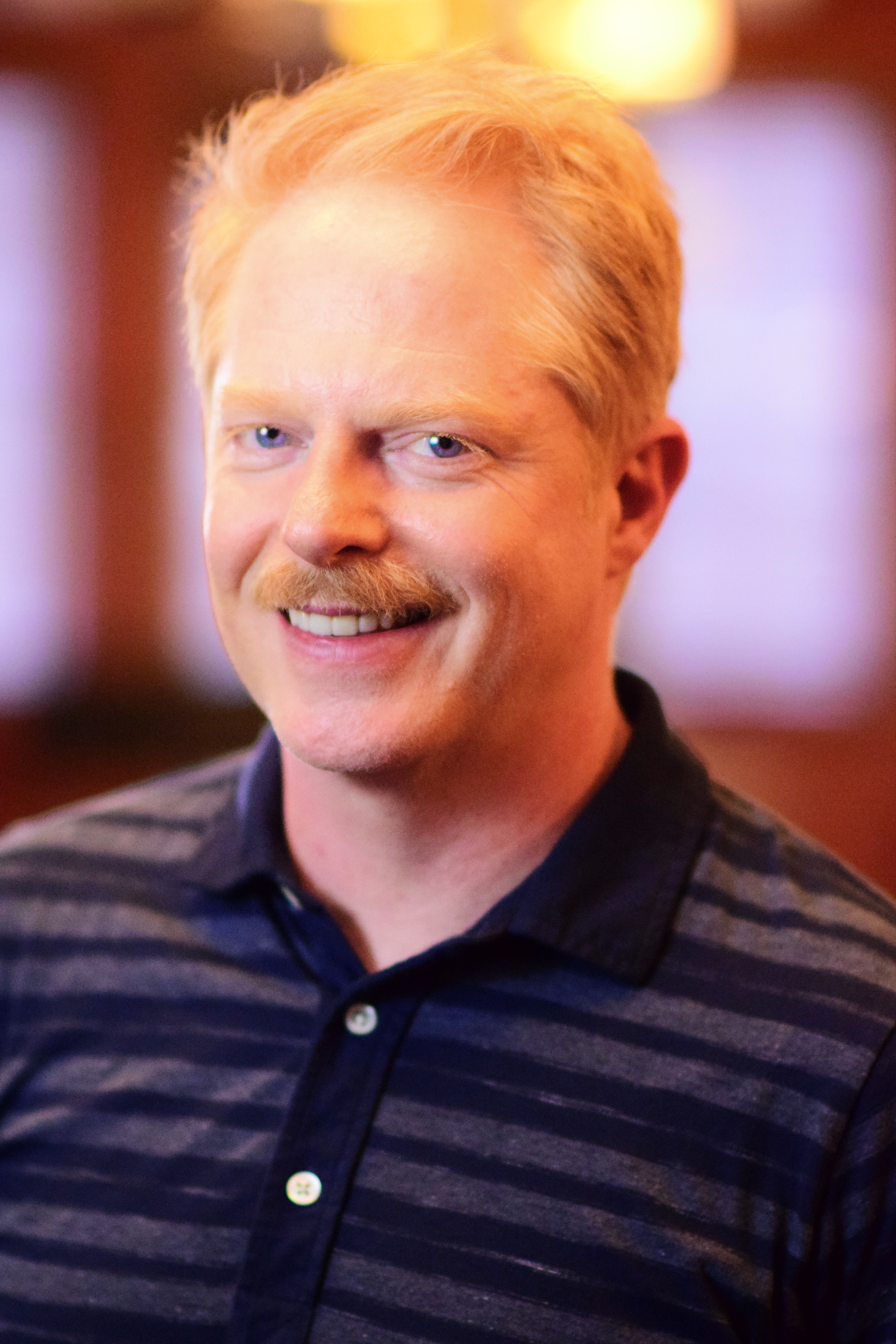
Jesse Tyler Ferguson, Best Performance by a Featured Actor in a Play winner

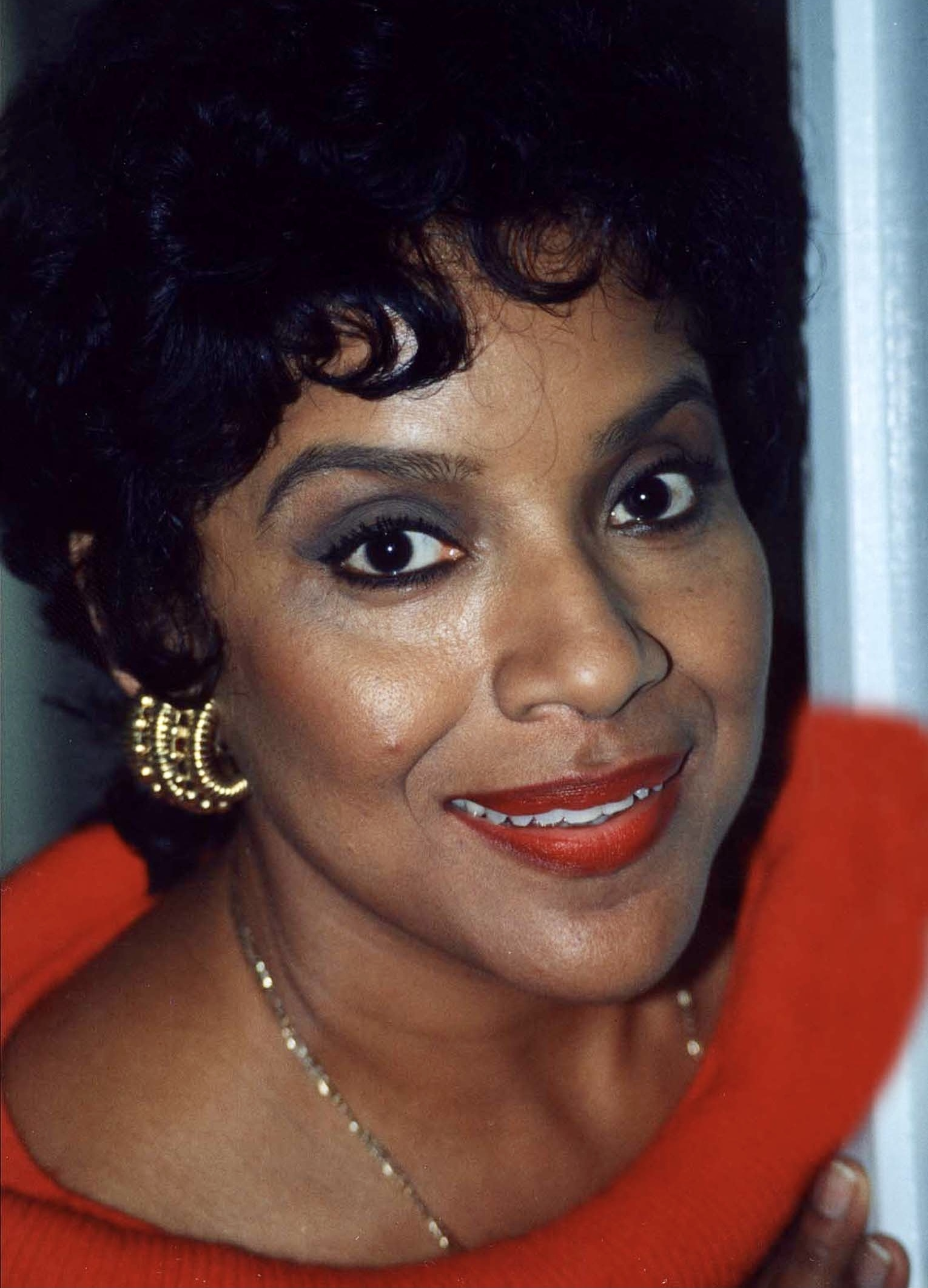
Phylicia Rashad, Best Performance by a Featured Actress in a Play winner

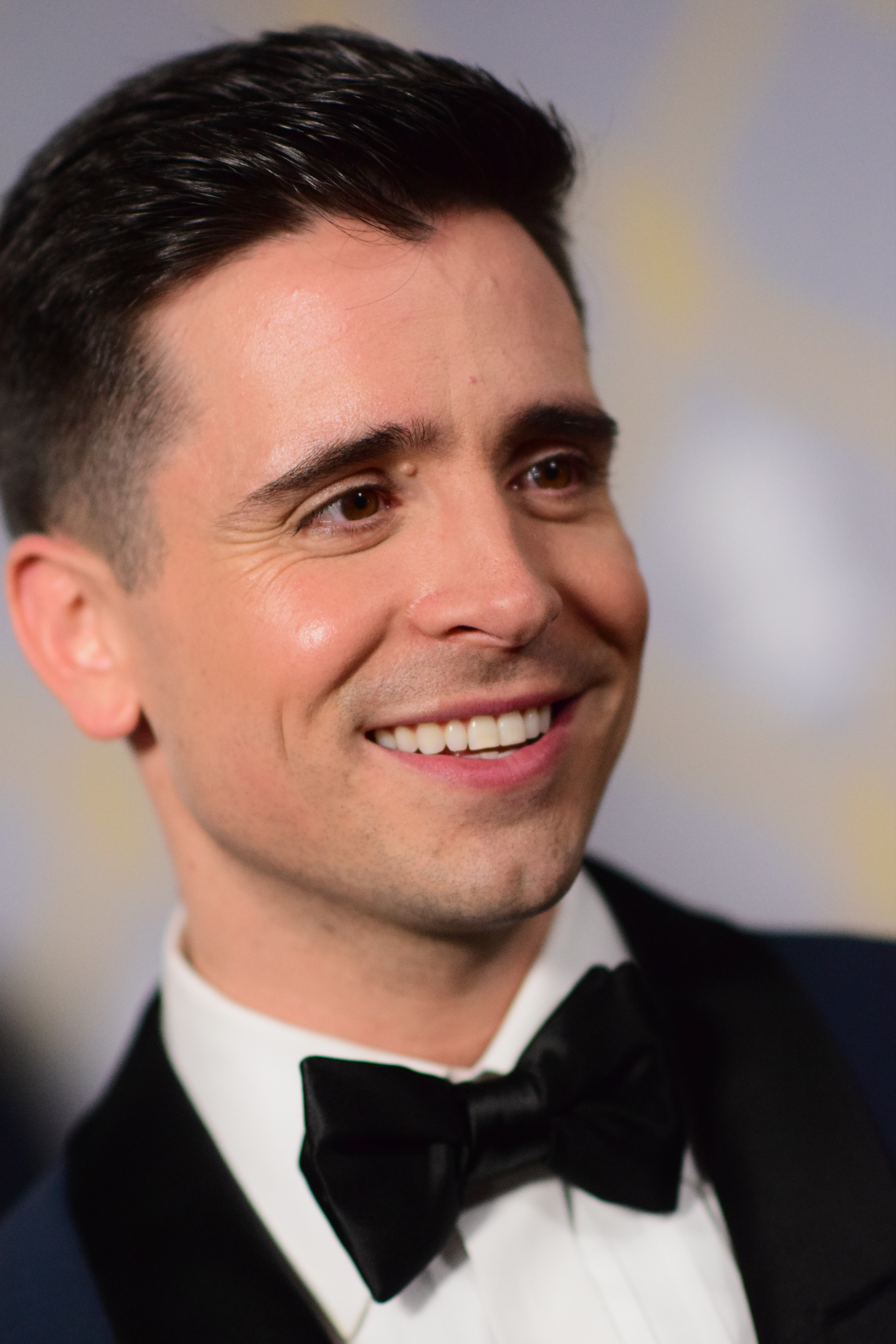
Matt Doyle, Best Performance by a Featured Actor in a Musical winner

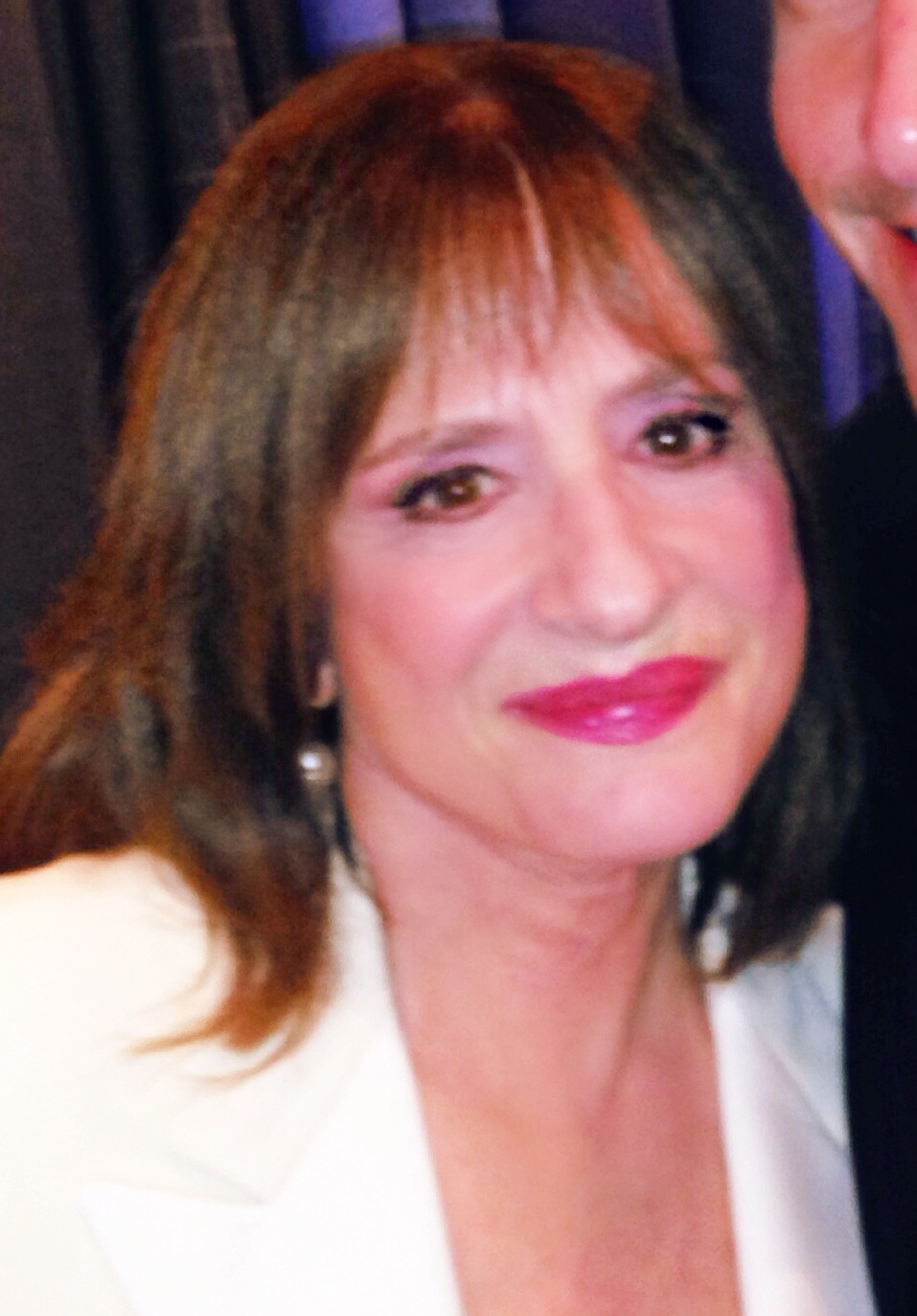
Patti LuPone, Best Performance by a Featured Actress in a Musical winner

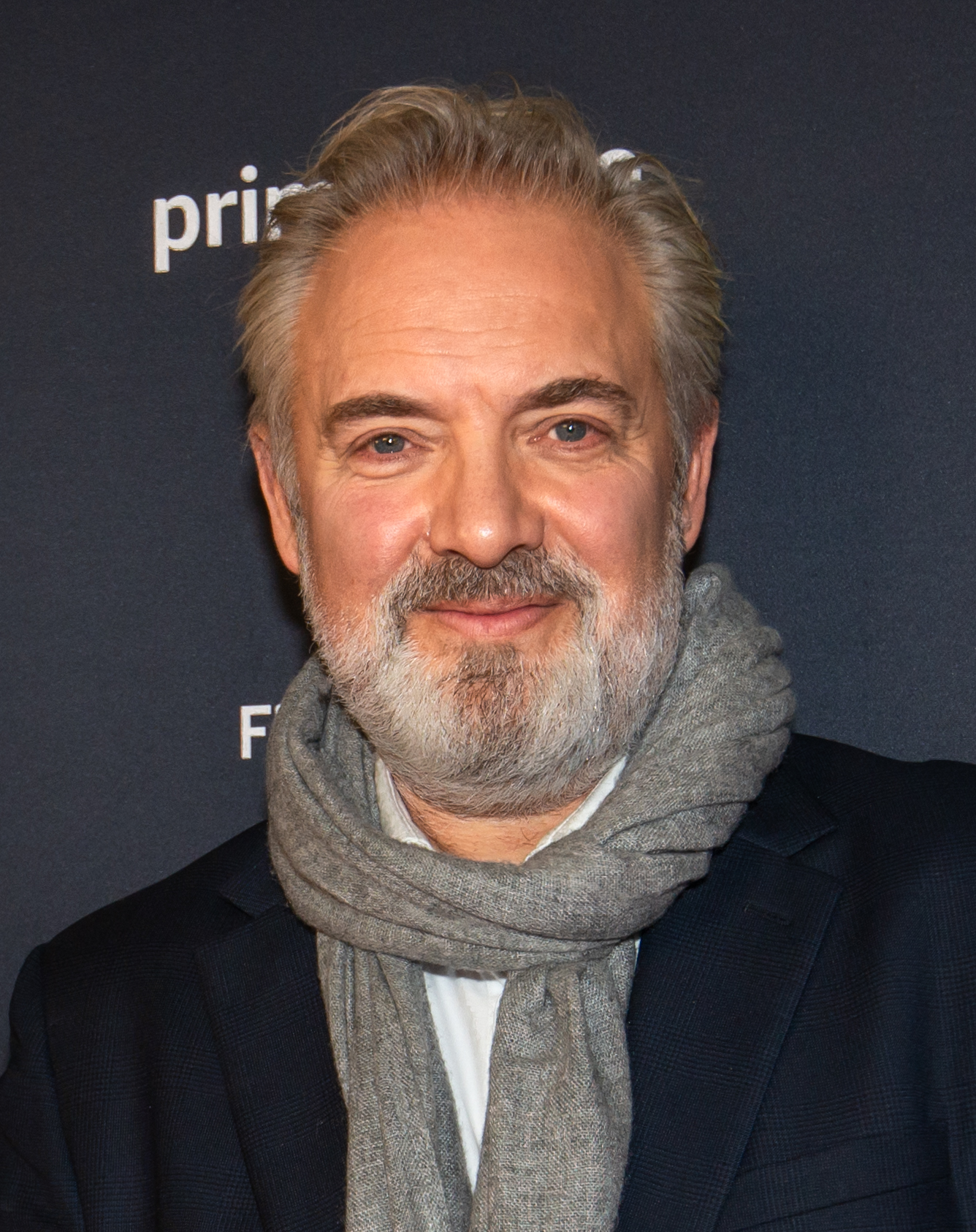
Sam Mendes, Best Direction of a Play winner

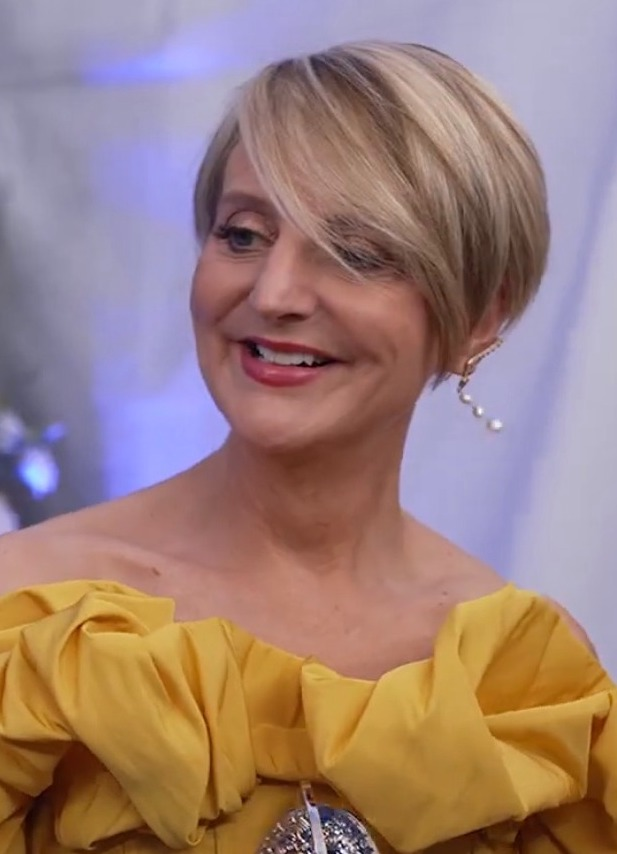
Marianne Elliott, Best Direction of a Musical winner

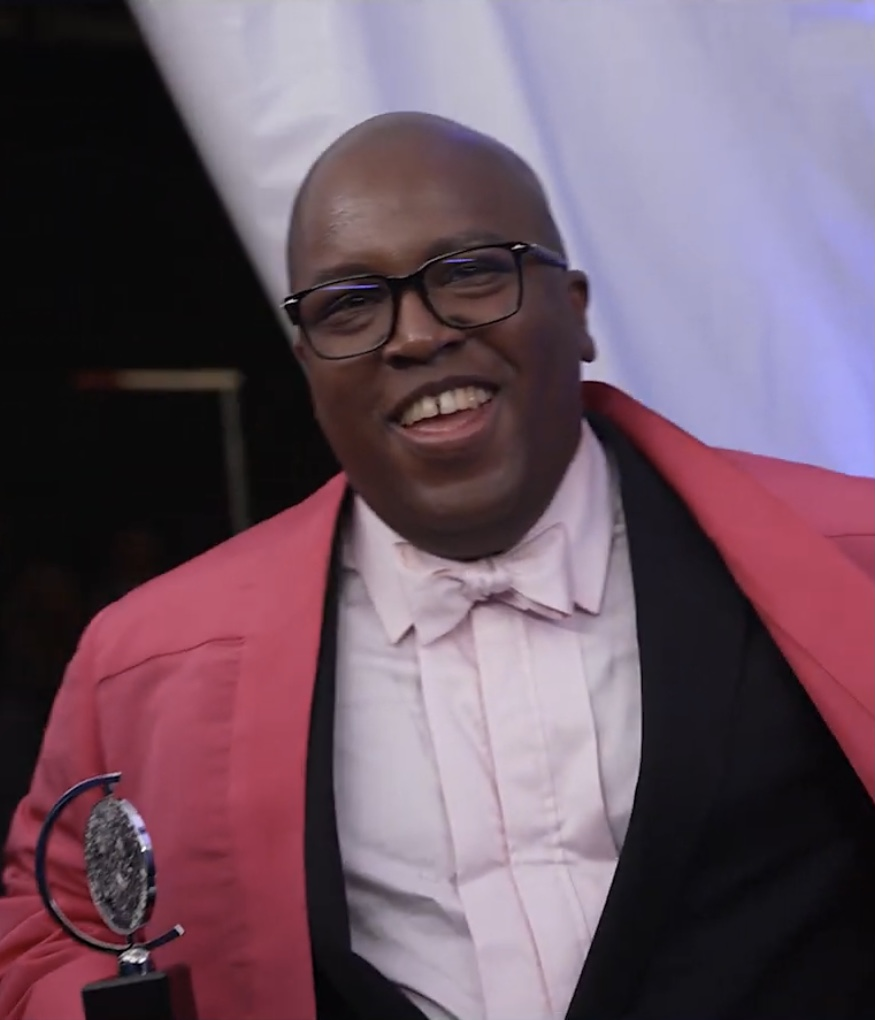
Michael R. Jackson, Best Book of a Musical winner

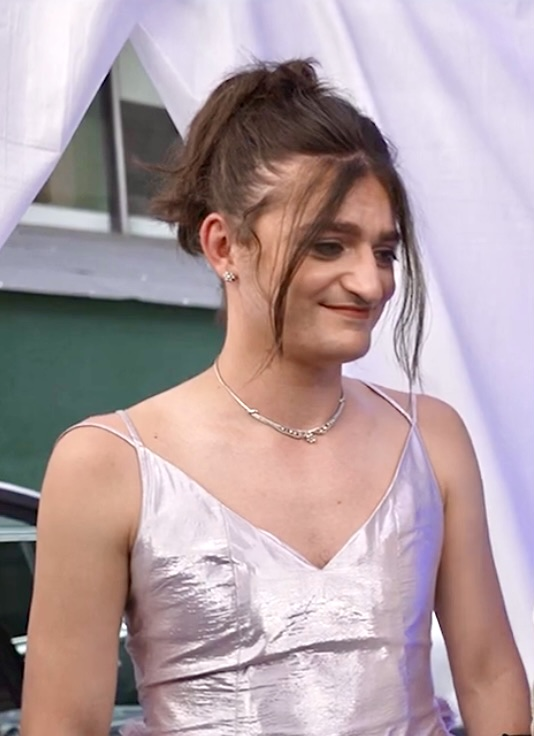
Toby Marlow, Best Original Score (Music and/or Lyrics) Written for the Theatre co-winner

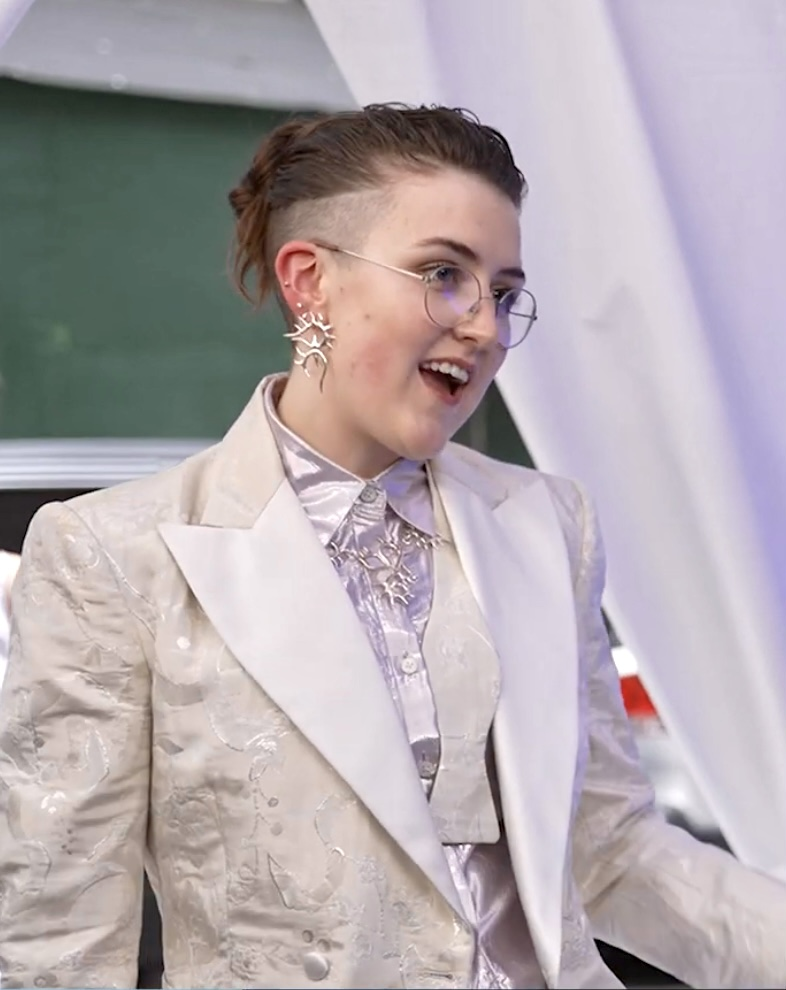
Lucy Moss, Best Original Score (Music and/or Lyrics) Written for the Theatre co-winner

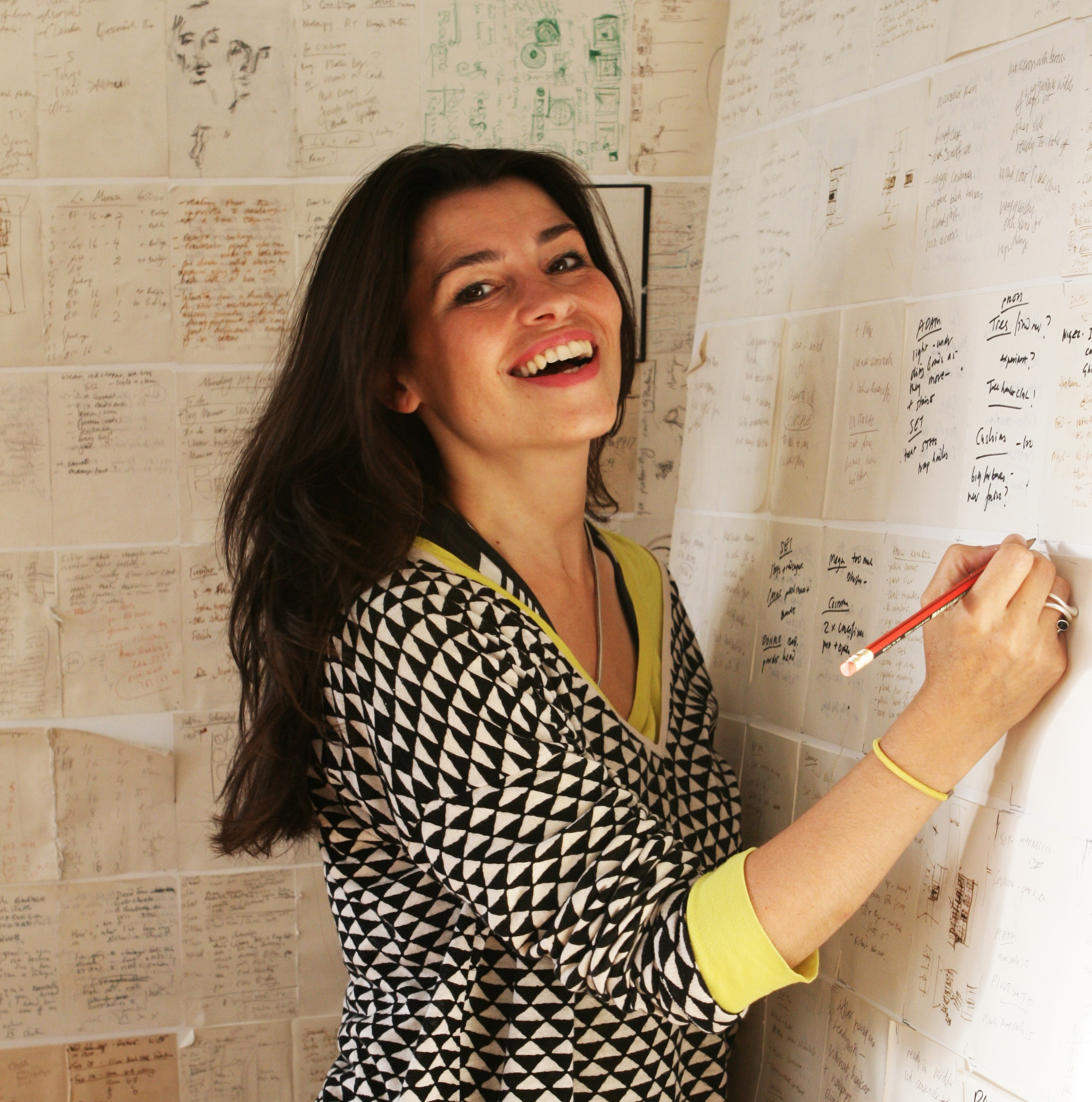
Es Devlin, Best Scenic Design of a Play winner

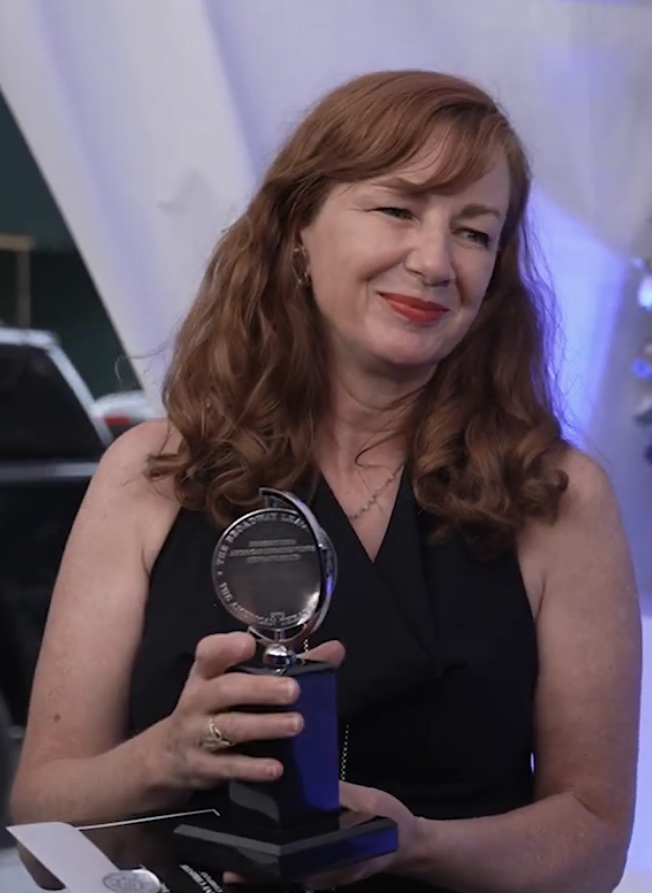
Bunny Christie, Best Scenic Design of a Musical winner

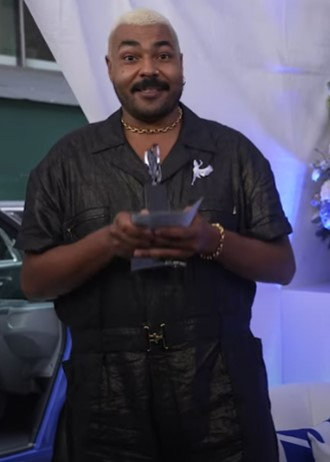
Montana Levi Blanco, Best Costume Design of a Play winner

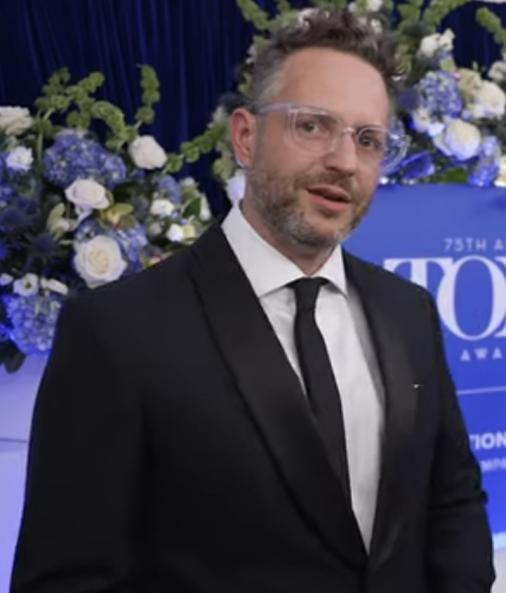
Jon Clark, Best Lighting Design of a Play winner

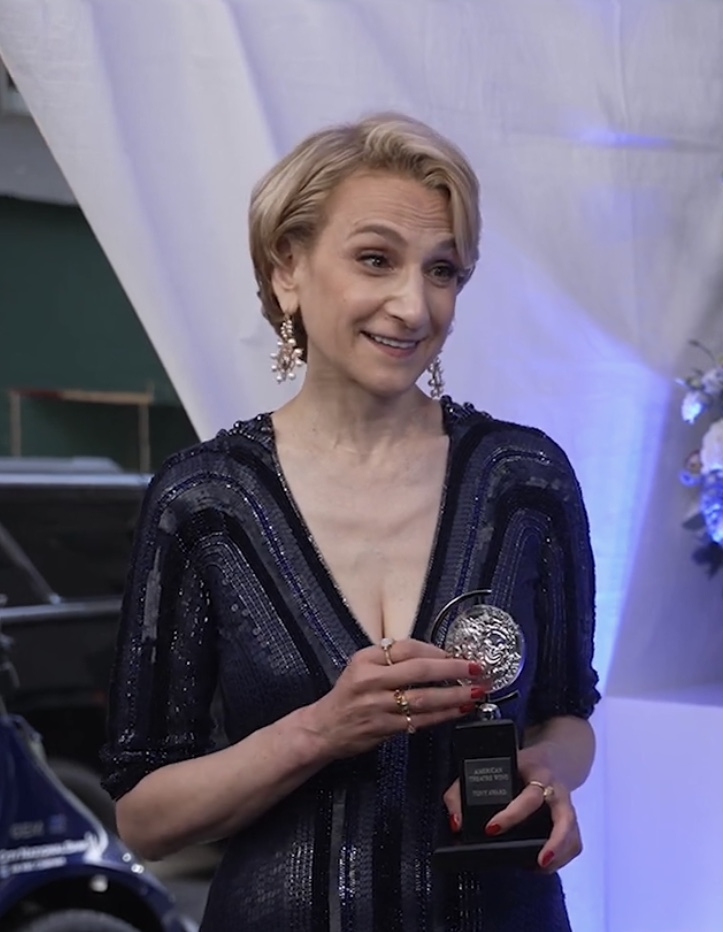
Natasha Katz, Best Lighting Design of a Musical winner

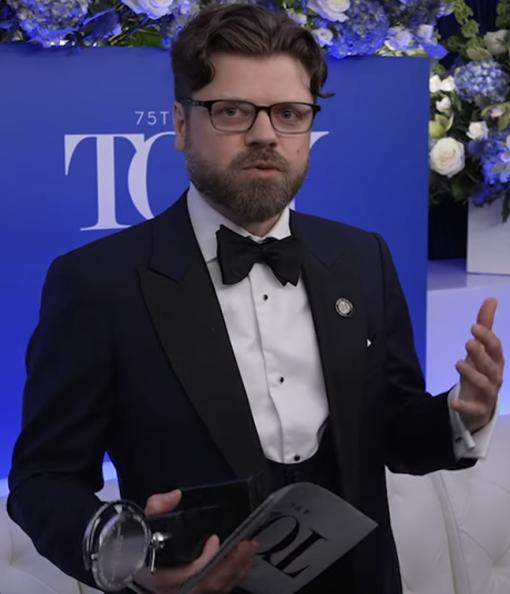
Mikhail Fiksel, Best Sound Design of a Play winner

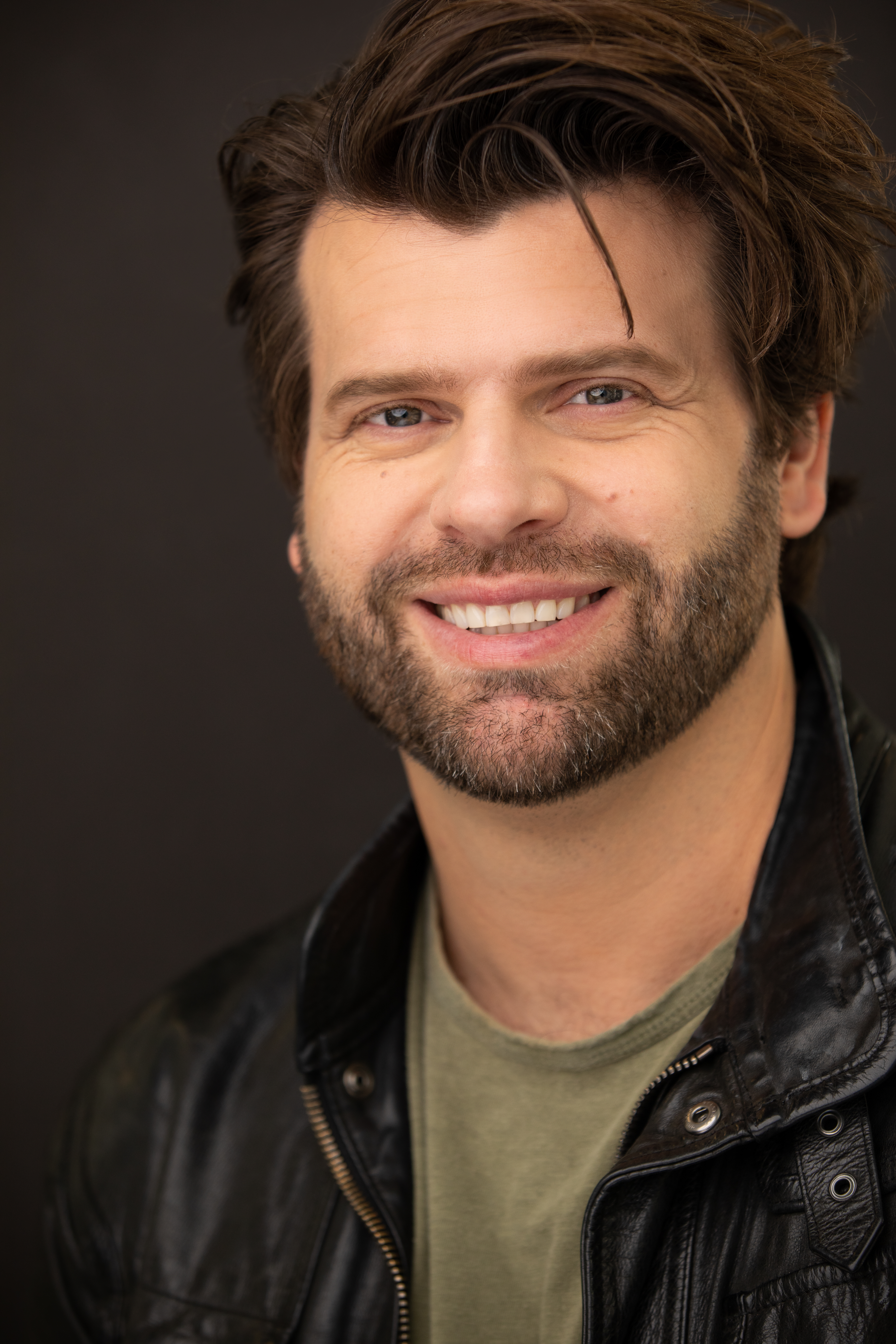
Gareth Owen, Best Sound Design of a Musical winner

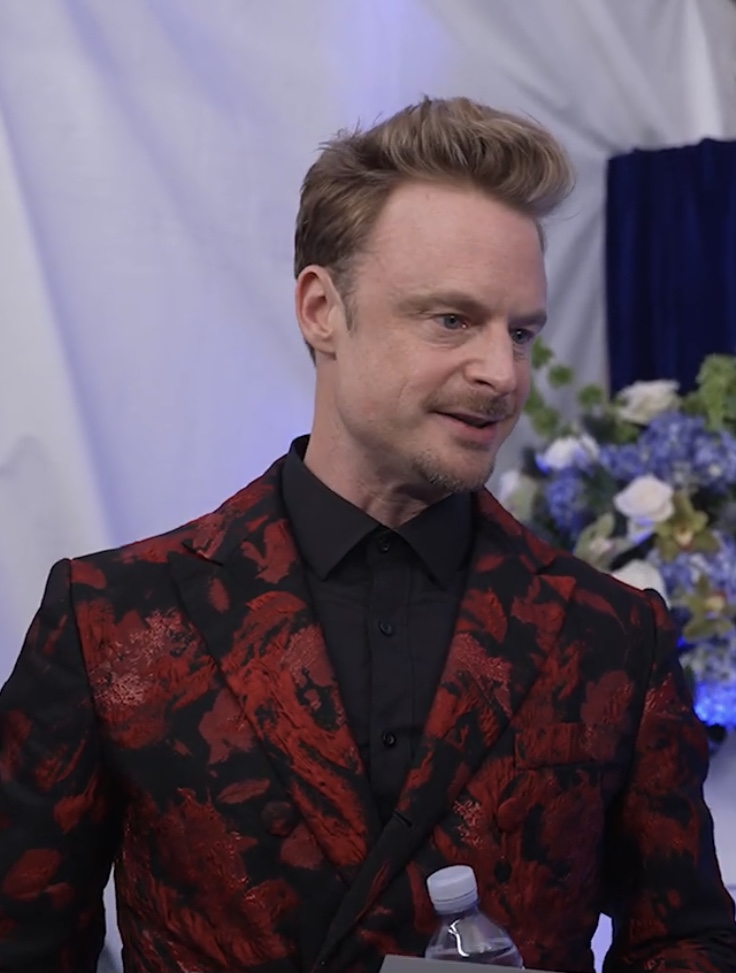
Christopher Wheeldon, Best Choreography winner

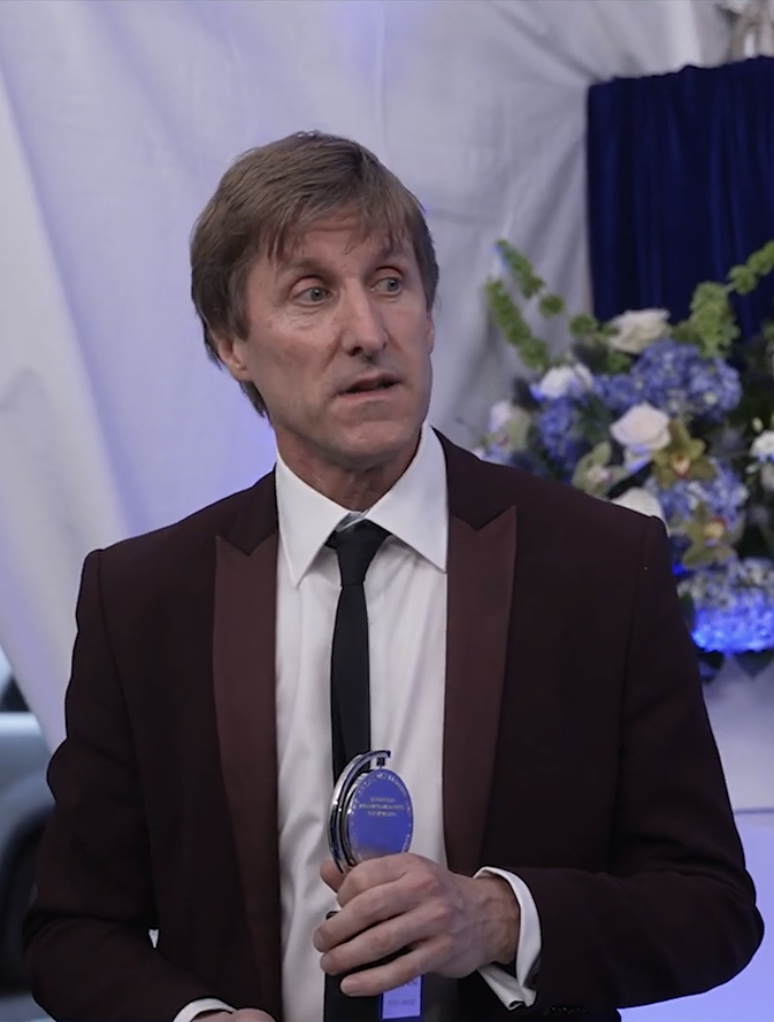
Simon Hale, Best Orchestrations winner

Winners are listed first, and are highlighted in boldface:

Best Play ‡	Best Musical ‡
**The Lehman Trilogy**; Clyde's; Hangmen; Skeleton Crew; The Minutes	**A Strange Loop**; Girl from the North Country; MJ; Mr. Saturday Night; Paradise Square; Six
Best Revival of a Play ‡	Best Revival of a Musical ‡
**Take Me Out**; American Buffalo; For Colored Girls Who Have Considered Suicide / When the Rainbow Is Enuf; How I Learned to Drive; Trouble in Mind	**Company**; Caroline, or Change; The Music Man
Best Actor in a Play	Best Actress in a Play
**Simon Russell Beale – The Lehman Trilogy as Henry Lehman**; Adam Godley – The Lehman Trilogy as Mayer Lehman; Adrian Lester – The Lehman Trilogy as Emanuel Lehman; David Morse – How I Learned to Drive as Uncle Peck; Sam Rockwell – American Buffalo as Teach; Ruben Santiago-Hudson – Lackawanna Blues as Various; David Threlfall – Hangmen as Harry Wade	**Deirdre O'Connell – Dana H. as Dana H.**; Gabby Beans – The Skin of Our Teeth as Sabina; LaChanze – Trouble in Mind as Wiletta Mayer; Ruth Negga – Macbeth as Lady Macbeth; Mary-Louise Parker – How I Learned to Drive as Li'l Bit
Best Actor in a Musical	Best Actress in a Musical
**Myles Frost – MJ as MJ**; Billy Crystal – Mr. Saturday Night as Buddy Young Jr.; Hugh Jackman – The Music Man as Harold Hill; Rob McClure – Mrs. Doubtfire as Daniel Hillard / Euphegenia Doubtfire; Jaquel Spivey – A Strange Loop as Usher	**Joaquina Kalukango – Paradise Square as Nelly O'Brien**; Sharon D. Clarke – Caroline, or Change as Caroline Thibodeaux; Carmen Cusack – Flying Over Sunset as Clare Boothe Luce; Sutton Foster – The Music Man as Marian Paroo; Mare Winningham – Girl from the North Country as Elizabeth Laine
Best Featured Actor in a Play	Best Featured Actress in a Play
**Jesse Tyler Ferguson – Take Me Out as Mason Marzac**; Alfie Allen – Hangmen as Mooney; Chuck Cooper – Trouble in Mind as Sheldon Forrester; Ron Cephas Jones – Clyde's as Montrellous; Michael Oberholtzer – Take Me Out as Shane Mungitt; Jesse Williams – Take Me Out as Darren Lemming	**Phylicia Rashad – Skeleton Crew as Faye**; Uzo Aduba – Clyde's as Clyde; Rachel Dratch – POTUS as Stephanie; Kenita R. Miller – for colored girls who have considered suicide / when the rainbow is enuf as Lady in Red; Julie White – POTUS as Harriet; Kara Young – Clyde's as Letitia
Best Featured Actor in a Musical	Best Featured Actress in a Musical
**Matt Doyle – Company as Jamie**; Sidney DuPont – Paradise Square as Washington Henry; Jared Grimes – Funny Girl as Eddie Ryan; John-Andrew Morrison – A Strange Loop as Thought 4; A. J. Shively – Paradise Square as Owen Duignan	**Patti LuPone – Company as Joanne**; Jeannette Bayardelle – Girl from the North Country as Mrs. Neilsen; Shoshana Bean – Mr. Saturday Night as Susan Young; Jayne Houdyshell – The Music Man as Eulalie McKechnie Shinn; L Morgan Lee – A Strange Loop as Thought 1; Jennifer Simard – Company as Sarah
Best Direction of a Play	Best Direction of a Musical
**Sam Mendes – The Lehman Trilogy**; Lileana Blain-Cruz – The Skin of Our Teeth; Camille A. Brown – for colored girls who have considered suicide / when the rainbow is enuf; Neil Pepe – American Buffalo; Les Waters – Dana H.	**Marianne Elliott – Company**; Jamie Armitage and Lucy Moss – Six; Stephen Brackett – A Strange Loop; Conor McPherson – Girl from the North Country; Christopher Wheeldon – MJ
Best Book of a Musical	Best Original Score (Music and/or Lyrics) Written for the Theatre
**A Strange Loop – Michael R. Jackson**; Girl from the North Country – Conor McPherson; MJ – Lynn Nottage; Mr. Saturday Night – Billy Crystal, Lowell Ganz, and Babaloo Mandel; Paradise Square – Christina Anderson, Larry Kirwan, and Craig Lucas	**Six – Toby Marlow and Lucy Moss (music and lyrics)**; A Strange Loop – Michael R. Jackson (music and lyrics); Flying Over Sunset – Tom Kitt (music) and Michael Korie (lyrics); Mr. Saturday Night – Jason Robert Brown (music) and Amanda Green (lyrics); Paradise Square – Masi Asare and Nathan Tysen (lyrics) and Jason Howland (music)
Best Scenic Design of a Play	Best Scenic Design of a Musical
**Es Devlin – The Lehman Trilogy**; Beowulf Boritt – POTUS; Michael Carnahan and Nicholas Hussong – Skeleton Crew; Anna Fleischle – Hangmen; Scott Pask – American Buffalo; Adam Rigg – The Skin of Our Teeth	**Bunny Christie – Company**; Beowulf Boritt and 59 Productions – Flying Over Sunset; Arnulfo Maldonado – A Strange Loop; Derek McLane and Peter Nigrini – MJ; Allen Moyer – Paradise Square
Best Costume Design of a Play	Best Costume Design of a Musical
**Montana Levi Blanco – The Skin of Our Teeth**; Sarafina Bush – for colored girls who have considered suicide / when the rainbow is enuf; Emilio Sosa – Trouble in Mind; Jane Greenwood – Plaza Suite; Jennifer Moeller – Clyde's	**Gabriella Slade – Six**; Fly Davis – Caroline, or Change; Toni-Leslie James – Paradise Square; William Ivey Long – Diana; Santo Loquasto – The Music Man; Paul Tazewell – MJ
Best Lighting Design of a Play	Best Lighting Design of a Musical
**Jon Clark – The Lehman Trilogy**; Joshua Carr – Hangmen; Jiyoun Chang – for colored girls who have considered suicide / when the rainbow is enuf; Jane Cox – Macbeth; Yi Zhao – The Skin of Our Teeth	**Natasha Katz – MJ**; Neil Austin – Company; Tim Deiling – Six; Donald Holder – Paradise Square; Bradley King – Flying Over Sunset; Jen Schriever – A Strange Loop
Best Sound Design of a Play	Best Sound Design of a Musical
**Mikhail Fiksel – Dana H.**; Dominic Bilkey and Nick Powell – The Lehman Trilogy; Justin Ellington – for colored girls who have considered suicide / when the rainbow is enuf; Palmer Hefferan – The Skin of Our Teeth; Mikaal Sulaiman – Macbeth	**Gareth Owen – MJ**; Simon Baker – Girl from the North Country; Paul Gatehouse – Six; Ian Dickinson for Autograph – Company; Drew Levy – A Strange Loop
Best Choreography	Best Orchestrations
**Christopher Wheeldon – MJ**; Camille A. Brown – for colored girls who have considered suicide / when the rainbow is enuf; Warren Carlyle – The Music Man; Carrie-Anne Ingrouille – Six; Bill T. Jones – Paradise Square	**Simon Hale – Girl from the North Country**; David Cullen – Company; Tom Curran – Six; David Holcenberg and Jason Michael Webb – MJ; Charlie Rosen – A Strange Loop

‡ The award is presented to the producer(s) of the musical or play.

=== Productions with multiple nominations and awards ===
Productions with multiple nominations
Nominations	Production
11	A Strange Loop
10	MJ
10	Paradise Square
9	Company
8	The Lehman Trilogy
8	Six
7	for colored girls who have considered suicide / when the rainbow is enuf
7	Girl from the North Country
6	The Music Man
6	The Skin of Our Teeth
5	Clyde's
5	Hangmen
5	Mr. Saturday Night
4	American Buffalo
4	Flying Over Sunset
4	Take Me Out
4	Trouble in Mind
3	Caroline, or Change
3	Dana H.
3	How I Learned to Drive
3	Macbeth
3	POTUS: Or, Behind Every Great Dumbass Are Seven Women Trying to Keep Him Alive
3	Skeleton Crew

Productions with multiple wins
Awards	Production
5	Company
5	The Lehman Trilogy
4	MJ
2	Dana H.
2	Six
2	A Strange Loop
2	Take Me Out

== Non-competitive awards ==
Names	Accolade
Robert E. Wankel (Note: "his generosity and service to the welfare of our Broadway community, over the past four decades and, especially in the face of a global crisis.")	Isabelle Stevenson Award
Angela Lansbury	Special Tony Award for Lifetime Achievement.
Asian American Performers Action Coalition	Tony Honors for Excellence in Theatre
Broadway for All	Tony Honors for Excellence in Theatre
music copyist Emily Grishman	Tony Honors for Excellence in Theatre
Feinstein's/54 Below	Tony Honors for Excellence in Theatre
United Scenic Artists (Local USA 829, IATSE)	Tony Honors for Excellence in Theatre
Court Theatre	The Regional Tony Award
James C. Nicola, retiring artistic director of the NYTW	Special Tony Award.

== Presenters and performers ==
Act One:

Presenters
Names	Notes
Vanessa Hudgens	presented Best Original Score
Judith Light	presented Best Costume Design in a Play and Best Costume Design in a Musical
Wilson Cruz	presented Best Scenic Design in a Play and Best Scenic Design in a Musical
Jeremy Pope	presented Best Lighting Design in a Play and Best Lighting Design in a Musical
Len Cariou	presented Special Tony Award to Angela Lansbury and introduced New York City Gay Men's Chorus
George Takei	presented Best Sound Design of a Play and Best Sound Design of a Musical
Gaten Matarazzo	presented Best Orchestrations
Bebe Neuwirth	presented Best Choreography

Main Show:

Presenters
Names	Notes
Jessica Chastain and Colman Domingo	presented Best Featured Actor in a Play
Patrick Wilson	Introduced The Music Man
Kelli O'Hara and Ruthie Ann Miles	presented Best Featured Actress in a Musical
Prince Jackson and Paris Jackson	introduced MJ the Musical
Josh Lucas and Sarah Paulson	presented Best Direction of a Play and Best Direction of a Musical
Sarah Silverman	Introduced Mr. Saturday Night
Skylar Astin and Marcia Gay Harden	presented Best Featured Actress in a Play
Patina Miller	introduced Company
Lilli Cooper and Julia Schick	Special presentation on the Tonys' history
LaTanya Richardson Jackson and Samuel L. Jackson	presented Best Revival of a Play
Anthony Edwards	Introduced Girl from the North Country
Utkarsh Ambudkar and Raúl Esparza	presented Best Featured Actor in a Musical
Lin-Manuel Miranda	presenter of the Stephen Sondheim tribute
Darren Criss and Julianne Hough	presented Best Book of a Musical
Renée Elise Goldsberry and Phillipa Soo	presented Best Revival of a Musical
Jennifer Hudson and RuPaul Charles	Introduced A Strange Loop
Telly Leung	presented Excellence in Theatre Education Award
Zach Braff and Lea Michele	Introduced the original cast of Spring Awakening
Andrew Garfield and Nathan Lane	presented Best Play
David Alan Grier	Introduced Paradise Square
Tony Goldwyn and Bryan Cranston	presented Best Actor in a Play
Tony Shalhoub and Danny Burstein	presented Best Actress in a Play
Laurence Fishburne	presenter of the In Memoriam tribute
Adrienne Warren and Aaron Tveit	presented Best Actor in a Musical
Danielle Brooks and Cynthia Erivo	presented Best Actress in a Musical
Bowen Yang	Introduced Six
Chita Rivera	presented Best Musical

Performances

The following shows and performers performed on the ceremony's telecast:

Act One:

Performers
Names	Song
Darren Criss and Julianne Hough	"Set the Stage"
New York City Gay Men's Chorus	"Mame"

Main Show:

Performers
Names	Song(s)
Ariana DeBose	"This Is Your Round of Applause"
The Music Man	"Seventy-Six Trombones"
MJ	"Smooth Criminal"
Mr. Saturday Night	"Stick Around" / "Buddy's First Act"
Company	"Company"
Girl from the North Country	"Like a Rolling Stone" / "Pressing On"
Bernadette Peters	"Children Will Listen"
A Strange Loop	"Intermission Song" / "Today"
The Original Cast of Spring Awakening	"Touch Me"
Paradise Square	"Paradise Square" / "Let It Burn"
Billy Porter	"On the Street Where You Live"
Six	"Ex-Wives" / "Six"
Ariana DeBose	"This Is Your Round of Applause" (Reprise)

== Reception ==
=== Reviews ===
The ceremony received generally favorable reviews from critics. On the review aggregator Rotten Tomatoes, the program received six positive and two negative reviews, for an approval rating of 75%.

In Variety, Gordon Cox praised the opening number of the CBS telecast and DeBose's performance as host therein, singling out the performance as "hip and queer and sexy, and it satisfied the old-school avids as much as it made Broadway look like a place the cool kids might want to check out, too". Jennifer Vanasco of NPR also praised DeBose, writing "Let Ariana DeBose host everything [...] She was funny and playful, strutting into the audience and sitting on Andrew Garfield's lap. She was poignant, coming to tears as she talked about her theater teacher mentor. She was honest, gently commenting on the racial disparities in the theater industry". Writing for the Associated Press, Jocelyn Noveck called the telecast "exuberant" and said that it showed "Broadway is back, with verve and creativity, and it is here to stay. It just needs even more people filling the seats".

Johnny Oleksinski of the New York Post panned the show, describing it as "low-energy, poorly put-on", writing that DeBose's "songs and banter were forced and unfunny", and heavily criticizing the ceremony's tribute to Stephen Sondheim, which he deemed "far too modest [...] a total afterthought".

=== Ratings ===
The CBS telecast was watched by 3.86 million viewers in the United States, marking a 39% increase from the previous year's ceremony, the lowest-rated Tony Awards broadcast since viewership was measured. However, when compared to the 73rd Tony Awards in 2019, which were the last one before the 75th to run three hours and the last one before the COVID-19 pandemic, viewership declined 29% between 2019 and 2022.

== In Memoriam ==
Billy Porter Performed On the Street Where You Live From The musical My Fair Lady.

- Sidney Poitier
- Jay Binder
- Leslie Bricusse
- Eugene Osborne Smith
- Leonard Soloway
- Sally Kellerman
- Alan Hall
- Maurice Murphy
- Alvin Deutsch
- Gary McAvay
- Rae Allen
- William Hurt
- Tony Walton
- Arlene Dahl
- Vinny Sainato
- Marilyn Bergman
- Donald Pippin
- Jonathan Reynolds
- Terry Teachout
- Bruce Pomahac
- Peter Scolari
- Hollis Resnik
- Harvey Evans
- Craig Jacobs
- Barbara Maier Gustern
- Robert Morse
- Joan Didion
- Stephen Sondheim

== See also ==
- Drama Desk Awards
- 2022 Laurence Olivier Awards – equivalent awards for West End theatre productions
- Obie Award
- New York Drama Critics' Circle
- Theatre World Award
- Lucille Lortel Awards
