= Masi Asare =

Musical theater composer, lyricist, and academic

- Education: New York University (MA, PhD); Harvard University (AB)
- Occupations: Composer; Lyricist; Professor
- Employer: Northwestern University

Masi Asare is an American lyricist, composer, playwright, and academic. She co-wrote the lyrics to the Broadway musical Paradise Square with Nathan Tysen. For this she was nominated for the Tony Award for Best Original Score at the 75th Tony Awards in 2022. She is also the lyricist for the Off-Broadway musical Monsoon Wedding and is the playwright for Mirror of Most Value: A Ms. Marvel Play; a play written for use in school drama programs for teenagers in collaboration with Marvel Comics. She is the composer, lyricist, and playwright for the musicals Rishvor and The Family Resemblance, and is the composer and lyricist for the musical Sympathy Jones. She currently is an assistant professor in the School of Communications at Northwestern University.

Asare was a Dramatist Guild fellow, and is a member of the Dramatists Guild. She is also in the BMI Advanced Workshop. She was listed by the Broadway Women's Fund as one of the "Women to Watch on Broadway" in 2022. There is a chapter about her in the book Conversations in Color: Exploring North American Musical Theatre.

== Early life and education ==
Asare grew up in Pennsylvania and attended State College Area High School (SCAHS) from which she graduated in 1996. While at SCHAS she was a member of the jazz band and was an active member of the school's drama program. She then studied at Harvard University where she earned a Bachelor of Arts. She later attended graduate school at New York University's Tisch School of the Arts where she earned both a Master of Arts and a Doctor of Philosophy. Her doctoral dissertation was titled "Voicing the Possible: Technique, Vocal Sound, and Black Women on the Musical Stage," for which she received an honorable mention in NYU's Outstanding Dissertation Awards.

== Career ==
Asare was a lyricist for the Broadway musical Paradise Square, which initially ran at Berkeley Repertory Theatre before transferring to Broadway.

She also wrote lyrics for Monsoon Wedding, which played off-Broadway, at St. Ann's Warehouse, in 2023. Monsoon Wedding "similarly [to Paradise Square] dealt with cultural cross-pollination," pointed out the New York Times. The show was in the making for 15 years, and the writers worked toward goals of stretching the form of musical theater to create something new and melding different styles and genres. It was called "an Invitation to Feminine and Queer Liberation."

It was based on the film Monsoon Wedding, which premiered in the 2001 Cannes Film Festival before winning the Golden Lion at the Venice International Film Festival and being nominated for a Golden Globe for Best Foreign Language Film. The story follows two families coming to Delhi for an arranged marriage, then expectations and reality collide. "The groom drifts between searching and belonging, and the bride’s past threatens to destroy her future. Chaos ensues, and as the nuptials draw closer, so do the maid and the wedding planner. Together they find love among the marigolds." "At its core, it’s a story of families: how they love, rejoice, and endure together."

During her time in the BMI Workshop, Asare wrote a show called Sympathy Jones, which premiered in at the New York Musical Theatre Festival in 2007. It was "about a receptionist at an intelligence agency who steals secret information in her quest to become a spy." Asare said of the show, "There are some great roles for women, but often they play ingenues whose goal is to get married...I wanted to write something for a woman character who wanted something more.” It has 11 songs available on the cast album. The show is two hours and ten minutes long with two acts. Educational rights opened for the show, and now it is played in high schools around the country, where "girl power takes center stage."

Asare teamed up with Marvel to write Mirror of Most Value: A Ms. Marvel Play, a show about accepting one’s imperfections, as part of a series of educational plays for teenagers. Asare said, "When I began working on the play, I had only a little knowledge about Kamala Khan as Ms. Marvel... I loved the idea of a superhero who is a brown girl from an immigrant background (like me), someone who wants to do good in the world, but isn’t always sure how to do it. So she’s kind of awkward and not-smooth and has her share of mishaps, but she still persists." "I hope we can take away something about how holding true to who we are and where we come from is the source of our power.”

Her show, The Family Resemblance, was workshopped in the Live & In Color Incubator. Additionally, it was commissioned by Theatre Royal Stratford East in London after being further developed at the Bingham Camp Theatre Retreat. Some excerpts of the show were played at a concert put on by the National Alliance for Musical Theatre. The show was presented at the Eugene O’Neill Theater Center, where Asare won the Paulette Haupt Composition Prize.

Asare's musical Delta Blue was workshopped at the Goodspeed Opera House as part of Goodspeed Musicals 2024 Johnny Mercer Foundation Writers Grove.

Asare was a co-writer for Marian, or the True Tale of Robin Hood, commissioned by the International Thespian Festival. She has also been featured at 54 Below multiple times.

== Academia ==
=== Research and expertise ===
Asare was a panelist at the Revolutions in Sound Symposium, meant to "bring together scholars from across the Americas examining how black and brown, LGBTQ+, indigenous, and crip communities instrumentalize sound in service of resistance, survivance, and radical world making." She is on the committee of the American Society for Theatre Research. She has also spoken on the "Phrases of Womanhood" panel, made up of female playwrights of color.

Among her publications was an article in the Journal of Popular Music Studies, and papers that she has presented at conferences include "Voice at the Limits of Hearing" (NYU Music Department, 2014) and "From a Whisper to a Scream: The Voice in Music" (EMP Pop, 2016).

=== Teaching ===
She is an assistant professor at Northwestern University, with areas of expertise in Black Studies, Musical Theatre, Sound Cultures, and Voice. She was a guest lecturer for the New York Youth Symphony Musical Theater Songwriting Program. She taught the first craft session, Making the Contemporary Musical, at the Dramatists Guild Institutute's Musical Theatre Intensive in Evanston, cohosted by the American Musical Theatre Project).

== Awards and nominations ==
- Tony Award nomination, Best Original Score
- Outer Critics Circle Award nomination, Outstanding Score
- The inaugural Billie Burke Ziegfeld Award, which provides a $10,000 grant and honors women creators in musical theater.
- The Stacey Mindich “Go Write A Musical” Lilly Award
- Theater Hall of Fame Emerging Artist Grant
- Paulette Haupt Composition Prize, Eugene O’Neill Theater Center
