= Paradise Square (musical) =

American stage musical

- Broadway promotional poster
- Music: Jason Howland
- Lyrics: Masi Asare; Nathan Tysen
- Book: Christina Anderson; Larry Kirwan; Craig Lucas
- Basis: Hard Times by Larry Kirwan
- Premiere: January 10, 2019: Berkeley Repertory Theatre
- Productions: 2012 Off Off Broadway; 2019 Berkeley; 2021 Chicago; 2022 Broadway

Paradise Square is a stage musical, with music by Jason Howland, lyrics by Masi Asare and Nathan Tysen, and a book by Christina Anderson, Larry Kirwan and Craig Lucas. Set in New York City during the Civil War and the New York City draft riots, the musical follows conflict between Irish Americans and Black Americans. The production is directed by Moisés Kaufman and choreographed by Bill T. Jones, with intimacy direction by Gaby Labotka. The musical opened on Broadway at the Ethel Barrymore Theatre on April 3, 2022.

The show received mixed reviews from critics, and earned 10 nominations at the 75th Tony Awards, including Best Musical, with Joaquina Kalukango winning Best Actress.

== Hard Times: An American Musical ==
Paradise Square is based on Hard Times: An American Musical, written and conceived by Kirwan, which was originally presented Off-Broadway in September of 2012 at The Cell Theatre as part of Origin Theatre Company's 1st Irish Festival. Directed by Kira Simring, the cast included Jed Peterson as Stephen Foster, Jennifer Lorae as Jane Foster, Almeria Campbell as Nelly Blythe, James Sasser as Michael Jenkins, Stephane Duret as Thomas Jefferson, and John Charles McLaughlin as Owen Duignan. The production was named a "Critic's Pick" by The New York Times.

== Production history ==
=== Berkeley (2018) ===
The musical premiered at Berkeley Repertory Theatre in Berkeley, California on December 27, 2018, for a limited run which was extended to March 3, 2019.

=== Chicago (2021) ===
It had a pre-Broadway run at the Nederlander Theatre in Chicago from November 2 to December 5, 2021. The production opened to mostly positive reviews.

=== Broadway (2022) ===
The musical began previews at the Ethel Barrymore Theatre in New York City on March 15, 2022, prior to an official opening on April 3, 2022. It received mixed reviews and was subsequently closed briefly due to widespread COVID-19 issues amongst the cast and crew.

On July 11, 2022, it was announced the musical would play its final Broadway performance on July 17, due to low ticket sales. After several cast members and stage managers spoke out against the working conditions and unpaid benefits, Actors' Equity announced plans to put producer Garth Drabinsky on the "Do Not Work" list, effectively banning him from producing any future Broadway shows.

An Original Broadway Cast Recording was expected to be released in September 2022, with a national tour in development for the 2023-24 season, and international productions also in the works. However, due to financial and legal dealings with Drabinsky, the album was placed on hold with no date determined for the album release as of January 2023.

== Musical numbers ==
=== Berkeley (2018) ===
Act I

- "Premonitions"
- "Some Folks Do"
- "Was My Brother in the Battle?"
- "The Five Points"
- "Camptown Races"
- "We Will Keep the Bright Lookout"
- "Ah, May the Red Rose Live Always"
- "Nelly Was a Lady"
- "Oh, Susanna"
- "Gentle Annie"
- "I Will Not Die in Springtime"
- "I'd Be a Soldier"
- "Someone to Love"
- "Angelina Baker"
- "Hard Times Come Again No More"

Act II

- "We Are Coming, Father Abraham"
- "Janey with the Light Brown Hair"
- "I'm Not That Man"
- "Ring, Ring the Banjo"
- "I Will Not Die in Springtime” (reprise)
- "Angelina Baker” (reprise)
- "Paradise Chorale"
- "Let It Burn"
- "Beautiful Dreamer"

=== Chicago (2021) ===
Act I

- "Paradise Square" – Nelly, Annie, Willie, Rev., Ensemble
- "I'm Coming" – Owen, Washington, Angelina
- "Camptown Races" – Owen, Washington, Milton
- "Larry’s Goodbye" – Willie, Nelly
- "Bright Lookout" – Rev., Dockworkers
- "True to a Country" – Tiggens, Mike, Ensemble
- "Oh, Susanna" – Ensemble
- "Gentle Annie" – Annie, Rev.
- "Why Should I Die in Springtime?" – Owen, Ensemble
- "I'd Be a Soldier" – Rev., Washington, Ensemble
- "Angelina Baker” (part 1) – Washington
- "Welcome Home" – Nelly, Ensemble

Act II

- "Angelina Baker” (part 2) – Amelia, Uptown Women
- "Ring, Ring the Banjo" – Nelly, Annie, Ensemble
- "Why Should I Die in Springtime? (reprise) – Owen, Ensemble
- "Angelina Baker” (part 3) – Washington, Ensemble
- "Someone to Love" – Annie, Nelly
- "One Match and One Man" – Mike, Tiggens, Ensemble
- "Breathe Easy" – Angelina, Washington, Ensemble
- "Hard Times" – Milton, Tiggens, Ensemble
- "No More" – Ensemble
- "Let It Burn" – Nelly
- "Finale" – Ensemble

=== Broadway (2022) ===
Act I

- "Paradise Square" – Nelly, Annie, Willie, Rev., Ensemble
- "I'm Coming" – Owen, Washington, Angelina, Annie, Rev.
- "Camptown Races" – Owen, Washington, Milton
- "Since the Day That I Met You" – Willie, Nelly
- "Bright Lookout" – Rev., Dockworkers
- "Tomorrow's Never Guaranteed" – Tiggens, Mike, Ensemble
- "I'm Coming" (reprise) – Angelina
- "Turn My Life Around" – Nelly, Ensemble
- "Gentle Annie" – Annie, Rev.
- "Why Should I Die in Springtime?" – Owen, Mike, Ensemble
- "I'd Be a Soldier" – Rev., Washington, Ensemble
- "Angelina Baker" – Washington
- "Heaven Save Our Home" – Nelly, Ensemble

Act II

- "Angelina Baker" (reprise) – Uptown Women
- "Now or Never" – Nelly, Annie, Ensemble
- "Why Should I Die in Springtime?" (reprise) – Owen, Ensemble
- "Always on My Mind" – Washington, Ensemble
- "Someone to Love" – Annie, Nelly
- "The Protest" – Mike, Owen, Tiggens, Ensemble
- "Breathe Easy" – Angelina, Washington, Ensemble
- "The Riot" – Tiggens, Ensemble
- "Chorale" – Nelly, Ensemble
- "Let It Burn" – Nelly
- "Finale" – Ensemble

== Cast and characters ==
Character	Berkeley	Chicago	Broadway
Character	2018	2021	2022
Nelly O'Brien	Christina Sajous	Joaquina Kalukango	Joaquina Kalukango
Annie Lewis	Madeline Trumble	Chilina Kennedy	Chilina Kennedy
Frederic Tiggens	—N/a	John Dossett	John Dossett
Washington Henry	Sidney DuPont	Sidney DuPont	Sidney DuPont
Owen Duignan	A.J. Shively	A.J. Shively	A.J. Shively
Reverend Samuel Jacob Lewis	Daren A. Herbert	Nathaniel Stampley	Nathaniel Stampley
Angelina Baker	Gabrielle McClinton	Gabrielle McClinton	Gabrielle McClinton
'Lucky' Mike Quinlan	Kevin Dennis	Kevin Dennis	Kevin Dennis
Milton Moore	Jacob Fishel	Jacob Fishel	Jacob Fishel
Willie O’Brien	Brendan Wall	Matt Bogart	Matt Bogart
Nova/“Paradise Square” Dancer	—N/a	Chloe Davis	Chloe Davis
Provost Marshal/Daniel Jenkins	Ben Michael	Ben Michael	Ben Michael
Sarah/"Paradise Square" Singer	—N/a	Hailee Kaleem Wright	Hailee Kaleem Wright
Blessed	—N/a	Kayla Pecchioni	Kayla Pecchioni
Amelia Tiggins	—N/a	Erica Spyres	Erica Spyres
Elmer Woods	Mark Uhre	Colin Cunliffe	Colin Cunliffe
Notification Officer/Way Station Attendant	—N/a	Josh Davis	Josh Davis
Janey Foster	Kennedy Caughell	—N/a	—N/a
Camp Butler	Bernard Dotson	—N/a	—N/a
Levi Butler	Jacobi Hall	—N/a	—N/a
Patrick Murphy	Chris Whelan	—N/a	—N/a

== Awards and nominations ==
Year	Award	Category	Nominee	Result
2022	Tony Awards	Best Musical		Nominated
2022	Tony Awards	Best Actress in a Musical	Joaquina Kalukango	Won
2022	Tony Awards	Best Featured Actor in a Musical	Sidney DuPont	Nominated
2022	Tony Awards	Best Featured Actor in a Musical	A.J. Shively	Nominated
2022	Tony Awards	Best Book of a Musical	Christina Anderson, Craig Lucas and Larry Kirwan	Nominated
2022	Tony Awards	Best Original Score	Jason Howland (music), Marcus Gardley and Nathan Tysen (lyrics)	Nominated
2022	Tony Awards	Best Scenic Design of a Musical	Allen Moyer	Nominated
2022	Tony Awards	Best Costume Design of a Musical	Toni-Leslie James	Nominated
2022	Tony Awards	Best Lighting Design of a Musical	Donald Holder	Nominated
2022	Tony Awards	Best Choreography	Bill T. Jones	Nominated
2022	Drama Desk Awards			
2022	Drama Desk Awards	Outstanding Actress in a Musical	Joaquina Kalukango	Won
2022	Drama Desk Awards	Outstanding Choreography	Bill T. Jones, Garrett Coleman, and Jason Oremus, Gelan Lambert and Chloe Davis	Won
2022	Drama Desk Awards	Outstanding Music	Jason Howland	Nominated
2022	Drama Desk Awards	Outstanding Wig and Hair Design	Matthew B. Armentrout	Nominated
2022	Outer Critics Circle Awards	Outstanding New Broadway Musical		Nominated
2022	Outer Critics Circle Awards	Outstanding Actress in a Musical	Joaquina Kalukango	Nominated
2022	Outer Critics Circle Awards	Outstanding Featured Actor in a Musical	A.J. Shively	Nominated
2022	Outer Critics Circle Awards	Outstanding Director of a Musical	Moisés Kaufman	Nominated
2022	Outer Critics Circle Awards	Outstanding Choreography	Bill T. Jones, Alex Sanchez, Garrett Coleman, and Jason Oremus	Nominated
2022	Outer Critics Circle Awards	Outstanding New Score	Jason Howland, Masi Asare and Nathan Tysen	Nominated
2022	Outer Critics Circle Awards	Outstanding Orchestrations	Jason Howland	Won
2022	Chita Rivera Awards	Outstanding Choreography in a Broadway Show	Bill T. Jones, Garrett Coleman, Jason Oremus	Won
2022	Chita Rivera Awards	Outstanding Ensemble in a Broadway Show		Nominated
2022	Chita Rivera Awards	Outstanding Female Dancer in a Broadway Show	Sidney DuPont	Nominated
2022	Chita Rivera Awards	Outstanding Female Dancer in a Broadway Show	A.J. Shively	Nominated
