= Deirdre O'Connell (actress) =

American actress

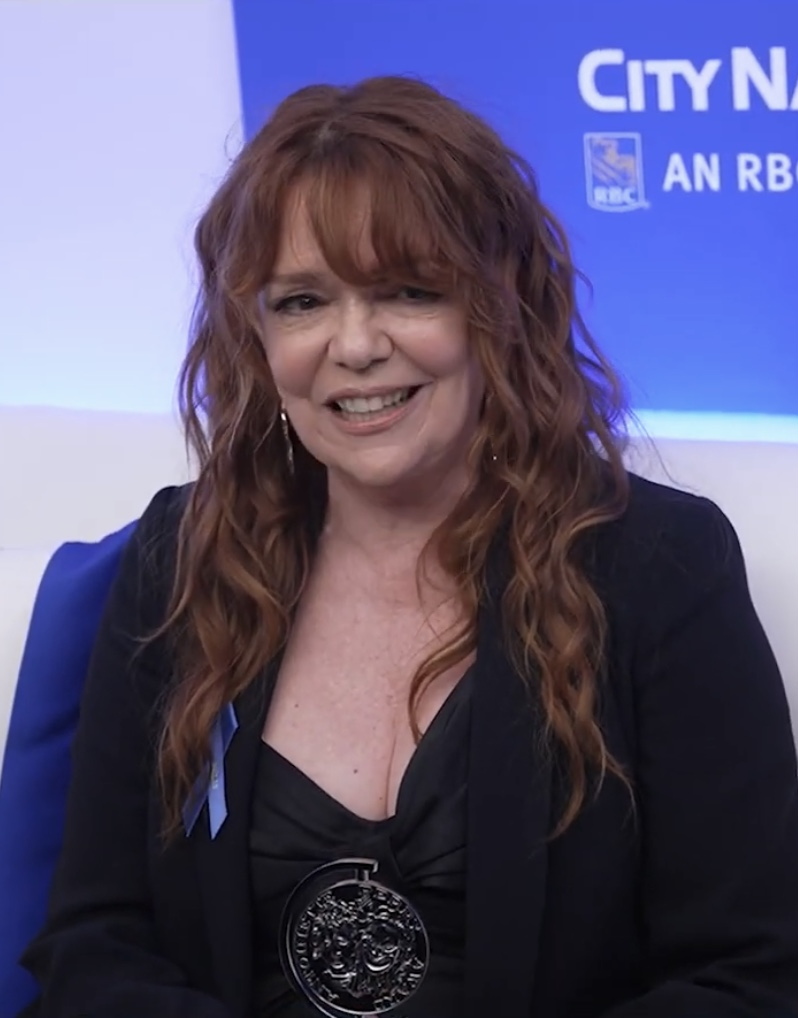
- O'Connell at the 75th Tony Awards in 2022
- Occupation: Actress
- Years active: 1985–present

Deirdre O'Connell is an American character actress who has worked extensively on stage, screen, and television. She has won a Tony Award and has been nominated for a Primetime Emmy Award and a Drama Desk Award.

== Early life ==
O'Connell grew up in Massachusetts, U.S. She is the oldest of three children of Anne Ludlum, playwright and actress, and Thomas E. O'Connell, founding president of Berkshire Community College. She attended Taconic High School. O'Connell enrolled at Antioch College in Ohio, but withdrew before graduating.

== Career ==
O'Connell began her career at Stage One, an experimental theatre at the Boston Center for the Arts. She made her Broadway debut in the 1986 revival of The Front Page, and was nominated for the 1991 Drama Desk Award for Outstanding Featured Actress in a Play for her performance in the off-Broadway production Love and Anger. She is the recipient of two Drama-Logue Awards and a Los Angeles Drama Critics Circle Award for her stage work in Los Angeles.

O'Connell made her screen debut in Tin Men. Additional film credits include State of Grace, Straight Talk, Leaving Normal, Fearless, City of Angels, Hearts in Atlantis, Imaginary Heroes, Eternal Sunshine of the Spotless Mind, Wendy and Lucy, What Happens in Vegas, Secondhand Lions, and Synecdoche, New York.

She was a regular on L.A. Doctors and has made numerous guest appearances on series such as Kate & Allie, Chicago Hope, The Practice, Six Feet Under, Law & Order: Criminal Intent, and Nurse Jackie. From 1994 to 2010, O'Connell appeared on six episodes of Law & Order, four of them as Dr. Valerie Knight, Anita Van Buren's oncologist in Season 20. In 2024, she portrayed Francis Cobb in the HBO series The Penguin.

== Awards and nominations ==
In 2020, O'Connell received a Special Citation from the New York Drama Critics' Circle for career excellence, including her performance in Lucas Hnath's Dana H. at the Vineyard Theatre. She also won the 2010 Ovation Award for Featured Actress in a Play for the role of Judy in the Center Theatre Group production of In the Wake. She received 2020 Lucille Lortel Award for Outstanding Solo Show performance in Lucas Hnath's Dana H. and Lifetime Achievement Award in 2022.

In 2022, she won the Tony Award for Best Actress in a Play for Dana H.

In 2024, she was nominated for Critics' Choice Awards for The Penguin in the Best Supporting Actress in a Movie/Miniseries. In 2025, she was nominated for the Primetime Emmy Award for Outstanding Supporting Actress in a Limited or Anthology Series or Movie.

== Filmography ==
=== Film ===
| Year | Title | Role | Notes |
|---|---|---|---|
| 1987 | Tin Men | Nellie | |
| 1988 | Stars and Bars | Shanda Gage | |
| 1989 | Misplaced | Ella | |
| 1990 | Brain Dead | Mrs. Halsey | |
| 1990 | State of Grace | Irene | |
| 1990 | Pastime | Inez Brice | |
| 1992 | Falling from Grace | Sally Cutler | |
| 1992 | Straight Talk | Lily | |
| 1992 | Leaving Normal | Ellen | |
| 1992 | CrissCross | Shelly | |
| 1992 | Cool World | Isabelle Malley | |
| 1993 | Fearless | Nan Gordon | |
| 1995 | Smoke | Sue | |
| 1996 | Lifeform | Dr. Gracia Scott | |
| 1998 | City of Angels | Mrs. Balford | |
| 1999 | Just Looking | Mrs. Braverman | |
| 2001 | Hearts in Atlantis | Mrs. Gerber | |
| 2001 | Ball in the House | Phyllis | |
| 2002 | Dragonfly | Gwyn | |
| 2003 | Secondhand Lions | Helen | |
| 2004 | Eternal Sunshine of the Spotless Mind | Hollis Mierzwiak | |
| 2004 | Imaginary Heroes | Marge Dwyer | |
| 2005 | Winter Passing | Deirdre | |
| 2005 | A Couple of Days and Nights | Cosmo | |
| 2006 | Stephanie Daley | Jane | |
| 2007 | Trainwreck: My Life as an Idiot | Cynthia | |
| 2008 | What Happens in Vegas | Mrs. Fuller | |
| 2008 | Synecdoche, New York | Ellen’s Mother | |
| 2008 | Wendy and Lucy | Deb (voice) | |
| 2009 | The Greatest | Joyce | |
| 2009 | A Dog Year | Donna Brady | |
| 2014 | Gabriel | Meredith | |
| 2014 | Apartment Troubles | Ina | |
| 2014 | St. Vincent | Linda | |
| 2014 | The Quitter | Kathleen Lembo | |
| 2016 | Detours | Beth | |
| 2017 | The Boy Downstairs | Amy | |
| 2018 | Diane | Donna | |
| 2018 | Lez Bomb | Rose | |
| 2020 | Before/During/After | Nancy | |
| 2022 | The Requin | Anne | |
| 2025 | Eddington | Dawn | |

=== Television ===
| Year | Title | Role | Notes |
|---|---|---|---|
| 1985–1986 | Loving | Sherri Rescott Watley | TV series |
| 1987 | Kate & Allie | Catherine | Episode: "Louis in Love" |
| 1990 | H.E.L.P. | Terrance | Episode: "Fire Down Below" |
| 1992 | Lifestories: Families in Crisis | Nancy Carlson | Episode: "Gunplay: The Last Day in the Life of Brian Darling" |
| 1993 | Sirens | Off. Heidi Schiller | Main role (season 1) |
| 1994 | Chicago Hope | Ellen Wheeler | Episodes: "You Gotta Have Heart", "Genevieve and Fat Boy" |
| 1994 | Law & Order | Jane Schuman | Episode: "Breeder" |
| 1995 | Fighting for My Daughter | Peggy | TV film |
| 1995 | Kansas | Holly | TV film |
| 1995 | Trial by Fire | Roberta | TV film |
| 1996 | Our Son, the Matchmaker | Winona | TV film |
| 1996 | Chasing the Dragon | Doris | TV film |
| 1996–1997 | Second Noah | Shirley Crockmeyer | Main role |
| 1997 | A Deadly Vision | Marilyn Middleton | TV film |
| 1997 | Breast Men | Lacey | TV film |
| 1998 | From the Earth to the Moon | Barbara Young | Episode: "The Original Wives Club" |
| 1998–1999 | L.A. Doctors | Suzanne Blum | Main role |
| 1999 | Murder in a Small Town | Kate Faxton | TV film |
| 2001 | Just Ask My Children | Ms. Landry | TV film |
| 2001 | The Practice | Jenny Baldwin | Episode: "Vanished: Parts 1 & 2" |
| 2001 | Law & Order | Joanna Wilder | Episode: "All My Children" |
| 2002 | Six Feet Under | LAC Arts Interviewer | Episode: "The Last Time" |
| 2005 | Law & Order: Criminal Intent | Nina Lipton | Episode: "The Good Child" |
| 2009–2010 | Law & Order | Dr. Valerie Knight | Guest role (season 20) |
| 2010 | You Don't Know Jack | Linda | TV film |
| 2011 | Unforgettable | Sue Kelly | Episode: "With Honor" |
| 2011 | Law & Order: Special Victims Unit | Judge Owens | Episode: "True Believers" |
| 2012 | Person of Interest | Joan | Episode: "Risk" |
| 2012 | The Closer | Liz Provenza | Episode: "Fool's Gold" |
| 2014 | Nurse Jackie | Helen | Episodes: "Rag and Bone", "Candyman", "Sisterhood" |
| 2014–2018 | The Affair | Athena Bailey | Recurring role |
| 2016–2018 | The Path | Gab Armstrong | Recurring role |
| 2017 | Madam Secretary | Audrey Stewart | Episode: "Article 5" |
| 2017 | The Holdouts | Annie | TV film |
| 2018 | $1 | Carol | "1.3" |
| 2018 | Daredevil | Anna Nelson | 3 episodes |
| 2021 | Tell Me Your Secrets | Gayle Scott | Episode: "Someone Worse Than Me" |
| 2022–2024 | Outer Range | Patricia Tillerson | 5 episodes |
| 2024 | The Penguin | Francis Cobb | Miniseries; main role |
| 2025 | The Beast in Me | Carol McGiddish | 4 episodes |
| 2026 | The Bear | Mary Heyman | Episode: "Raspberries" |

=== Stage ===
| Year | Title | Role | Notes |
|---|---|---|---|
| 1986 | The Front Page | Mollie Malloy | Vivan Beaumont Theater, Broadway |
| 1990 | Love and Anger | Sarah Downey | New York Theatre Workshop, Off-Broadway |
| 2004 | Spatter Pattern (Or, How I Got Away With It) | Selma/Andrea/Others | Playwrights Horizons, Off-Broadway |
| 2005 | Manic Flight Reaction | Marge | Playwrights Horizons, Off-Broadway |
| 2006 | A Nervous Smile | Blanka | Williamstown Theatre Festival |
| 2007 | Fugue | Mary | Cherry Lane Theatre, Off-Broadway |
| 2009 | Circle Mirror Transformation | Marty | Playwrights Horizons, Off-Broadway |
| 2010 | In the Wake | Judy | Public Theater, Off-Broadway |
| 2012 | Magic/Bird | Dinah Bird/Patricia Moore/Shelly/Georgia Bird | Longacre Theatre, Broawday |
| 2014 | By The Water | Mary Murphy | Manhattan Theatre Club, Off-Broadway |
| 2015 | Little Children Dream of God | Carolyn | Roundabout Theatre Company, Off-Broadway |
| 2016 | The Way West | Mom | LAByrinth Theater Company, Off-Broadway |
| 2017 | Fulfillment Center | Suzan | Manhattan Theatre Club, Off-Broadway |
| 2018 | Terminus | Eller | New York Theatre Workshop, Off-Broadway |
| 2019 | Before the Meeting | Gail | Williamstown Theatre Festival |
| 2021 | Dana H. | Dana H. | Lyceum Theatre, Broadway |
| 2022 | Corsicana | Justice | Playwrights Horizons, Off-Broadway |
| 2022 | Becky Nurse of Salem | Becky | Lincoln Center Theatre, Off-Broadway |
| 2025 | Glass. Kill. What If If Only. Imp. | The Gods | Public Theater, Off-Broadway |
| 2026 | Romeo and Juliet | The Nurse | Shakespeare in the Park, Off-Broadway |
| 2027 | Old Actress | Diane | Atlantic Theater Company, Off-Broadway |
