= BMI Lehman Engel Musical Theatre Workshop =

American theatre education program

The BMI Lehman Engel Musical Theatre Workshop is a two-year educational program for people who wish to develop a musical and has been called "the premier incubator for Broadway". At the end of the second year, a small number of selected participants are invited to join the advanced workshop program for further study and collaboration on works in development.

The workshop was created in 1961 by BMI and Lehman Engel and is free for participants. Among the musicals developed or partly developed in the workshop are Avenue Q, A Chorus Line and Little Shop of Horrors. The workshop grants Jerry Harrington Awards for Creative Excellence to four participants each year.

In 2006, Drama Desk awarded the BMI Workshop a Special Award "for nurturing, developing and promoting new talent for the musical theater." The same year, the workshop was one of the recipients of the Tony Honors for Excellence in Theatre. The New York Times called the BMI Workshop "The Harvard of Showtunes".

== History ==
In March 1961, BMI vice president Robert Sour approached Lehman Engel about starting a workshop where he would teach principles of musical theatre writing to promising composers and lyricists. The classes would be open to any writer, whether their music was licensed by ASCAP or BMI, and no tuition would be charged. The only requirement was passing "the strong scrutiny of Engel's eyes and ears." Engel supervised the workshop and led weekly sessions from then until the end of his life, continuing to teach while undergoing radiation treatment for his cancer and producing his final student showcase in 1982, the year he died. One student said of Engel's support of his students, "if you brought in a song that worked, you were only the second happiest person in the room [to Engel]."

After Engel's death, duties were divided, with different people running the first year, second year, and advanced workshops. Maury Yeston led the advanced workshop for the next two decades until 2003, when Patrick Cook, a member of the advisory committee, who had been involved with the BMI workshop since the 1980s, took over.

The musical A Class Act, about composer-lyricist Ed Kleban, one of the workshop's early students, had several scenes set in the BMI Workshop. Kleban was played by Lonny Price, who also directed, and Engel was played by Patrick Quinn. The score consists of Kleban songs that were first heard in the workshop.

== Operation ==
Applicants for the BMI Workshop must pass a screening process, first by submitting three songs. Some are then invited to audition for admission. Those who are accepted to the workshop are invited to participate for free. All BMI workshops run from approximately September to June at the BMI facility in lower Manhattan, New York City.

In the first year, students are paired with a different partner for each assignment. The workshop teaches show tune writing styles, such as ballads, comedy songs and charm songs, and other basic techniques. The first assignment of the first year is to write a song where someone tells a lie; another is a song for Blanche from A Streetcar Named Desire. A third assignment is the suicide scene in Death of a Salesman. The last assignment of the first year is a presentation by each writing team of a 10-minute musical.

In the second year, teams stay in the same pairings throughout the year and musicalize an already existing work. At the end of the year, each team presents its four best songs, and the steering committee decides whether the writers are cut or may continue into the advanced workshop. Admission to the advanced workshop is by invitation only, to a small number of "writers of professional caliber who are expected to contribute to the vitality of the musical theatre scene".

Composers and lyricists in the advanced workshop are welcome to stay for as many years as they would like while they workshop new material. They participate in discussions and roundtables, and collaboratively develop new works. As of 2008, 250 people had been invited to the advanced workshop.

BMI hosts a separate librettist workshop for bookwriters, also created by Lehman Engel to supplement the composer-lyricist workshops. The first year is called "Bookwriting Basics". To apply to the librettist workshop, applicants must submit a resume and two 10-page writing samples, at least one of which must be comedic. After the first year, some of the participants are invited to the advanced librettist workshop.

BMI provides opportunities for workshop members to have their work publicly performed, including semi-annual "smokers", named after former workshop moderator Maury Yeston's "informal music gatherings while an undergraduate". In 2019, a showcase concert featured works only from BMI Workshop artists of color, called Make Them Hear You.

== Jerry Harrington awards ==
The workshop grants Jerry Harrington Awards for Creative Excellence annually to a member of each workshop division (1st year, 2nd year, advanced and librettist). Jeff Marx and Robert Lopez, co-creators Avenue Q, were recipients in 2000, the first year the awards were granted.

== Broadway shows developed in the workshop ==
Maury Yeston wrote the first three songs for Nine while in the workshop. Barry Brown and Fritz Holt saw these presented at one of the workshop's showcases in 1974 and decided to produce the show. Yeston said, "In 1970 ... I joined the BMI Music Theatre Workshop ... Lehman was instrumental in my working on the Fellini musical, which I decided to call Nine. It was really the first project that was born in the workshop. It contains so many of Lehman’s teachings and I’m very, very grateful to him."

Next to Normal and Avenue Q both started as first-year 10-minute musical projects.

Other Broadway shows developed in the workshop have included:

- A Chorus Line
- Little Shop of Horrors
- Urinetown
- Violet
- Raisin
- The Best Little Whorehouse in Texas
- Lucky Stiff

== Notable alumni ==
- Lynn Ahrens
- Gerard Alessandrini
- Masi Asare
- Kristen Anderson-Lopez
- Howard Ashman
- Neil Bartram
- Susan Birkenhead
- Jeff Blumenkrantz
- Douglas J. Cohen
- Stephen Flaherty
- Scott Frankel
- Gary William Friedman
- Ira Gasman
- Clark Gesner
- Amanda Green
- Carol Hall
- Mark Hollmann
- Tom Kitt
- Edward Kleban
- Michael Korie
- Michael John LaChiusa
- Andrew Lippa
- Robert Lopez
- Jeff Marx
- Alan Menken
- Dan Mertzlufft
- Helen Park
- Glenn Slater
- Gary Stockdale
- Bruce Sussman
- Jeanine Tesori
- Judd Woldin
- Sara Wordsworth
- Maury Yeston
- Brian Yorkey
