= Joaquina Kalukango =

American actor and singer

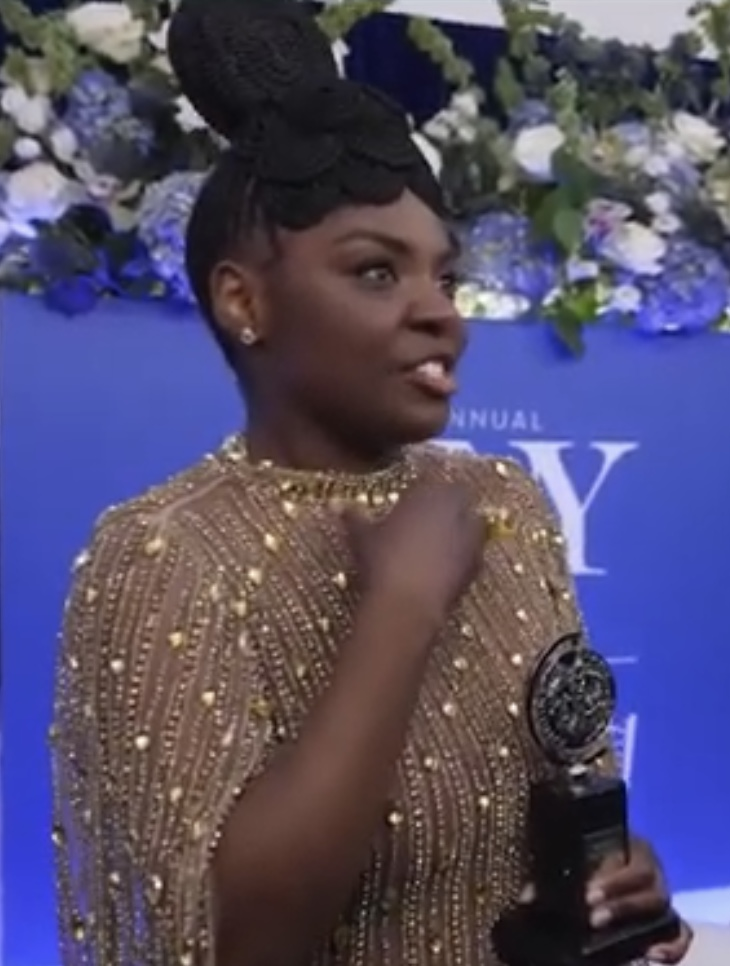
- Born: 1988 or 1989 (age 37–38); Atlanta, Georgia, U.S.
- Education: Juilliard School
- Occupations: Actor, singer
- Years active: 2011–present

Joaquina Kalukango (born 1988 or 1989) is an American actor and singer best known for playing Nelly O'Brien in the Broadway musical Paradise Square, for which she won the 2022 Tony Award for Best Actress in a Musical. She was nominated for Best Actress in a Play in 2020 for portraying Kaneisha in Slave Play. In addition to her theatre work, Kalukango has appeared in One Night in Miami..., When They See Us and Lawmen: Bass Reeves.

== Early life ==
Born in Atlanta, Kalukango is of Angolan descent, and her parents arrived in the United States as political refugees. She has three siblings. In 2007, Kalukango became a YoungArts alumnus. She attended the Juilliard School. Due to her heritage, Kalukango wants to work on roles that showcase the Black experience.

== Filmography ==
=== Film ===
Year	Title	Role	Notes
2015	I Had a Dream	Betty Shabazz	Short film
2019	Chained for Life	Michelle	
2020	One Night in Miami...	Betty Shabazz	

=== Television ===
Year	Title	Role	Notes
2019	When They See Us	Adelle	Episode: "Part Three"
2019	Instinct	Angela	Episode: "Trust Issues"
2020	Lovecraft Country	Hanna	4 episodes
2021	Robin Roberts Presents: Mahalia	Mildred Falls	Television film
2023	Lawmen: Bass Reeves	Esme	6 episodes

== Theatre credits ==
Year	Title	Role	Venue
2011	Ragtime	Sarah	Hangar Theatre
2011–2012	Godspell	Ensemble	Circle in the Square Theatre
2012	Hurt Village	Cookie	Romulus Linney Courtyard Theatre
2012	Emotional Creature		Romulus Linney Courtyard Theatre
2014	Antony and Cleopatra	Cleopatra	Anspacher Theater
2014	Holler If Ya Hear Me	Kamilah, Ensemble	Palace Theatre
2014	Our Lady of Kibeho	Marie-Clare Mukangango	Irene Diamond Stage
2015	The Wild Party	Kate	New York City Center, Encores!
2015–2016	The Color Purple	Nettie	Bernard B. Jacobs Theatre
2017	The Red Letter Plays: Fucking A	Canary Mary	Romulus Linney Courtyard Theatre
2018	How to Succeed in Business Without Really Trying	Smitty	Kennedy Center
2019–2020	Slave Play	Kaneisha	John Golden Theatre
2021	Paradise Square	Nelly O'Brien	Nederlander Theatre
2022	Paradise Square	Nelly O'Brien	Ethel Barrymore Theatre
2022–2023	Into the Woods	The Witch	St. James Theatre
2024	Jelly's Last Jam	Anita	New York City Center, Encores!
2025	Saturday Church	Aunt Rose	New York Theatre Workshop
2026	The Heart	Marianne Lamar	Laura Pels Theatre, Off-Broadway

== Awards and nominations ==
Year	Award	Category	Work	Result
2012	Drama Desk Award	Outstanding Featured Actress in a Play	Hurt Village	Nominated
2020	Tony Award	Best Performance by a Leading Actress in a Play	Slave Play	Nominated
2021	Screen Actors Guild Award	Outstanding Performance by a Cast in a Motion Picture	One Night in Miami...	Nominated
2022	Tony Award	Best Performance by a Leading Actress in a Musical	Paradise Square	Won
2022	Drama Desk Award	Outstanding Actress in a Musical	Paradise Square	Won
2022	Drama League Award	Distinguished Performance	Paradise Square	Nominated
2022	Outer Critics Circle Award	Outstanding Actress in a Musical	Paradise Square	Nominated
