= James C. Nicola =

American theatre director

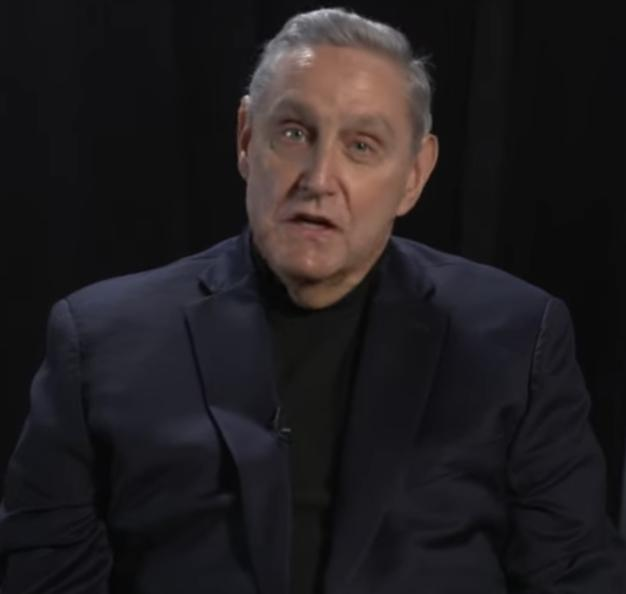
- Nicola in 2022
- Occupation: Theatre director

James C. Nicola is an American theatre director. From 1988 to 2022 he was the artistic director of the New York Theatre Workshop. Nicola was awarded a Special Tony Award at the 75th Tony Awards.
