= Mikhail Fiksel =

Russian-American sound designer (born 1980)

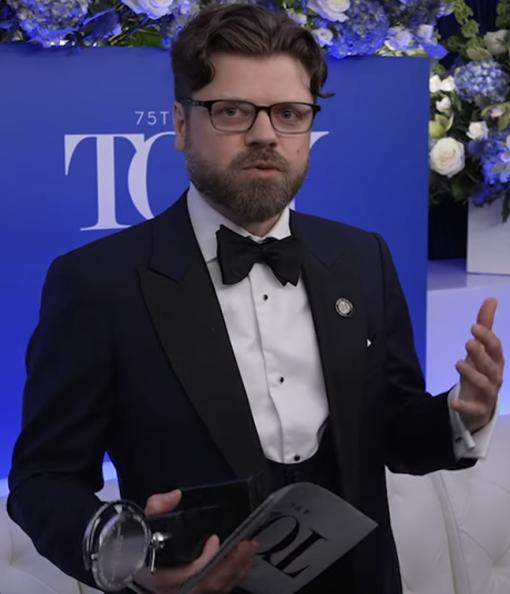
- Fiksel in 2022
- Born: March 21, 1980 (age 46); Novosibirsk, Russia
- Occupation: Sound designer

Mikhail Fiksel (born March 21, 1980) is a Russian-American composer and sound designer. He won a Tony Award in the category Best Sound Design of a Play for the play Dana H.

== Early life ==
Fiksel was born in Akademgorodok, near Novosibirsk, Russia, and received early training in classical music. After immigrating to the United States, he became involved in underground electronic music and DJ culture. His work draws on a wide range of musical influences and frequently explores juxtaposition, re-contextualization, and experimental approaches to sound. He has collaborated with artists and theatre companies including Chay Yew, Les Waters, Robert Falls, Kimberly Senior, and Anne Kauffman. He plays piano and bass.

== Career ==
Fiksel began his career as a DJ under the name "DJ White Russian" before exploring sound design. He then gained experience in sound design in Chicago and New York City, working for theatres such as the Goodman Theatre and Playwrights Horizons.

Mikhail Fiksel is an Assistant Professor of Instruction in Sound Design at Columbia College Chicago and has previously taught at Loyola University Chicago (2008–2015) and the University of Chicago. His teaching focuses on sound design for theatre, including both foundational and advanced techniques and their application in storytelling and immersive performance.

He is a Resident Artist with Albany Park Theatre Project, Teatro Vista, and Strawdog Theatre Company, with sound design credits including “Blood and Gifts,” “The How and the Why,” “Inana,” and “A Disappearing Number.” He is also a company member of 2nd Story and has collaborated with Third Rail Projects on immersive works such as “Learning Curve” (2016) and “Port of Entry” (2023). and an Artistic Associate with TimeLine Theatre Company

His Broadway credits include Dana H., for which he won the 2022 Tony Award for Best Sound Design in a Play, the 2024 revival of Uncle Vanya, and the 2025 premiere of Little Bear Ridge Road.

== Stage credits ==
Year	Title	Role	Venue	Ref.
2007	Massacre	Sound Designer	Regional, Goodman Theatre	
2011	Dartmoor Prison	Sound Designer	Regional, Goodman Theatre	
2011	Chicago Boys	Sound Designer	Regional, Goodman Theatre	
2011	Ask Aunt Susan	Sound Designer	Regional, Goodman Theatre	
2012	Fish Men	Sound Designer	Regional, Goodman Theatre	
2012	Black n Blue Boys	Sound Designer	Regional, Goodman Theatre	
2012	Song for the Disappeared	Sound Designer	Regional, Goodman Theatre	
2012	The World of Extreme Happiness	Sound Designer	Regional, Goodman Theatre	
2014	Buzzer	Sound Designer	Regional, Goodman Theatre	
2014	Venus in Fur	Sound Designer	Regional, Goodman Theatre	
2014	The World of Extreme Happiness	Sound Designer	Regional, Goodman Theatre	
2014	Feathers and Teeth	Sound Designer	Regional, Goodman Theatre	
2014	The Magic Play	Sound Designer	Regional, Goodman Theatre	
2014	Carlyle	Sound Designer	Regional, Goodman Theatre	
2015	The Upstairs Concierge	Sound Designer	Regional, Goodman Theatre	
2015	Feathers and Teeth	Sound Designer	Regional, Goodman Theatre	
2016	A Life	Sound Designer	Off-Broadway, Playwrights Horizons	
2016	2666	Sound Designer	Regional, Goodman Theatre	
2016	The Sign in Sidney Brustein's Window	Sound Designer	Regional, Goodman Theatre	
2017	The Treasurer	Sound Designer	Off-Broadway, Playwrights Horizons	
2017	King of the Yees	Sound Designer	Regional, Goodman Theatre	
2017	La Havana Madrid	Sound Designer	Regional, Goodman Theatre	
2018	This Flat Earth	Sound Designer	Off-Broadway, Playwrights Horizons	
2018	The Wolves	Sound Designer	Regional, Goodman Theatre	
2018	We’re Only Alive for a Short Amount of Time	Sound Designer	Regional, Goodman Theatre	
2018	Lady in Denmark	Sound Designer	Regional, Goodman Theatre	
2019	Cambodian Rock Band	Sound Designer	Off-Broadway, Pershing Square Signature Center	
2019	Dana H.	Sound Designer	Regional, Goodman Theatre	
2020	Dana H.	Sound Designer	Off-Broadway, Vineyard Theatre	
2020	Roe	Sound Designer	Regional, Goodman Theatre	
2021	Dana H.	Sound Designer	Broadway, Lyceum Theatre	
2021	I Hate It Here	Sound Designer	Regional, Goodman Theatre	
2021	Nightwatch – New Stages:	Sound Designer	Regional, Goodman Theatre	
2022	Tambo & Bones	Sound Designer	Off-Broadway, Playwrights Horizons	
2022	Good Enemy	Sound Designer	Off-Broadway, Minetta Lane Theatre	
2023	How to Defend Yourself	Sound Designer	Off-Broadway, New York Theatre Workshop	
2024	Uncle Vanya	Sound Designer	Broadway, Vivian Beaumont Theatre	
2025	Mexodus	Sound Designer	Off-Broadway, Minetta Lane Theatre	
2025	Little Bear Ridge Road	Sound Designer	Broadway, Booth Theatre	

== Awards and nominations ==
Year	Award	Category	Work	Result	Ref.
2017	Lucille Lortel Award	Outstanding Sound Design	A Life	Won	
2017	Drama Desk Award	Outstanding Sound Design in a Play	A Life	Nominated	
2018	Lucille Lortel Award	Outstanding Sound Design	The Treasurer	Nominated	
2020	Drama Desk Award	Outstanding Sound Design in a Play	Dana H.	Nominated	
2020	Outer Critics Circle Award	Outstanding Sound Design	Dana H.	Won	
2020	Obie Award	Design Award	Dana H.	Won	
2022	Tony Award	Tony Award for Best Sound Design in a Play	Dana H.	Won	
2023	Lucille Lortel Award	Outstanding Sound Design	How to Defend Yourself	Nominated	
2026	Lucille Lortel Award	Outstanding Sound Design	Mexodus	Won	
2026	Drama Desk Award	Outstanding Sound Design in a Musical	Mexodus	Won	
