= Christina Anderson (playwright) =

American playwright and educator

- Born: Kansas City, Kansas, U.S.
- Education: Brown University (BA); Yale University (MFA)
- Occupation: Playwright
- Writing career
- Genre: American theatre

Christina Anderson is an American playwright and educator. She is best known for her plays Good Goods and Inked Baby. Her work has received several honors and awards, including two Playwrights of New York (PoNY) nominations as well as the Lorraine Hansberry Award. Anderson is a Resident Playwright at the organization New Dramatists and the social justice theatre company Epic Theatre Ensemble. She has served as an Assistant Professor of Playwriting at Purchase College, and as the interim Head of Playwriting at Brown University.

== Life and career ==
Born and raised in Kansas City, Kansas, Anderson obtained her bachelor's degree from Brown University and a Master of Fine Arts in the Yale School of Drama's Playwriting Program. While at Yale, she was lectured by Pulitzer Prize winning Playwright Paula Vogel.

Anderson has been a playwright in residence at various institutions, including the New Dramatists and Epic Theatre Ensemble. Additionally Anderson is an active member of the DNAWORKS Ensemble. At the Playwright's Center in Minneapolis she served as a Core Writer.

The American Theatre Magazine named Anderson one of fifteen up-and-coming artists "whose work will be transforming America's stages for decades to come".

Anderson debuted Off-Broadway in 2009 with her play Inked Baby.

Her play Good Goods premiered at the Yale Repertory, directed by Tina Landau. The cast included Tony Nominee De'Adre Aziza, Angela Lewis, Oberson K.A. Adjepong, Marc Damon Johnson, Clifton Duncan.

Good Goods was categorized as a Post Black Play in the Methuen Drama Book of Post-Black Plays.

== Works ==
=== Plays ===
- How to Catch Creation
- pen/man/ship
- The Ashes Under Gait City
- Man in Love
- Blacktop Sky
- Sweet Brown Ginger
- Hollow Roots
- Inked Baby
- Good Goods
- Drip
- the ripple, the wave that carried me home

Anderson's plays have been produced at theaters including the Yale Repertory Theatre, the Penumbra Theatre Company, Playwrights Horizons, The Public Theater, Kansas City Repertory Theatre, and the Oregon Shakespeare Festival.

== Awards and honors ==
Awards and Nominations
Lorraine Hansberry Award from the American College Theater Festival
Wourzell Prize Finalist from the University of Vienna (2011)
Two Playwrights of New York nominations
Two Susan Smith Blackburn nominations
Wasserstein Prize Nomination from the Dramatists Guild
Tony Award for Best Book of a Musical nomination for Paradise Square (musical) (2022)
Steinberg Playwright Award (2024)
Windham–Campbell Literature Prize in the drama category.

Fellowships and Residencies
Van Lier Playwrighting Fellowship at New Dramatists
The Lucille Lortel Fellowship at Brown University
National Playwrights' Conference Residency at the Eugene O'Neill Theater Center

== Critical reception ==
Good Goods was praised by critics for its intriguing and ambiguous style. Critics appreciated the various characters and the relationships between them in the play. However, several critics saw the play as disjointed, and believed there was too much going on at once. The New York Times review wrote that Anderson is "saying something profound with 'Good Goods,' but it seems either too subtle or too ambitious in its complexity".

Inked Baby received positive critical reviews for its "natural dialogue and honesty of family relationships." She was praised by Variety for having "the voice of a poet, [which] she is generous in lending it to characters who can't easily articulate the thoughts and feelings that create conflict and pain in their lives". However, some critics, such as Time Out, felt that, "much of the most important material [in the play] seems vague and underdeveloped".
