= Angelina Baker =

Song by Christy Minstrels
- Published: 1850
- Songwriter: Stephen Foster

"Angelina Baker", sometimes sung as "Angeline the Baker" (Roud 18341) is a song written by Stephen Foster for the Christy Minstrels, and published in 1850. The original laments the loss of a woman slave, sent away by her owner. The lyrics have been subjected to the folk process, and some versions have become examples of the "Ugly Girl" or "Dinah" song.

Music historian Ken Emerson noted that controversy over free and slave states, as well as Fugitive Slave Act of 1850, were hotly debated topics at the time of the song's composition. According to Emerson, Foster's lyrics obliquely acknowledge these controversies. Uncertain of the reception his blackface songs would receive, he temporarily abandoned the genre.

== Fiddle tune ==
An instrumental version, as collected by John A. Lomax under the title "Angelina the Baker" is a popular fiddle or banjo tune, and differs from the Stephen Foster melody. It is part of the old time fiddle canon, but is also played by bluegrass musicians. This old-time tune was also played as bluegrass by Stuart Duncan at the 2007 Delaware Valley Bluegrass Festival.

== Lyrics ==
According to Lyle Lofgren, writing for Inside Bluegrass, publication of the Minnesota Bluegrass and Old-Time Music Association, "Foster published Angelina Baker in 1850, and it was featured on stage by the original Christy Minstrels." The melody and lyrics are as follows:

Angeline the baker lives in our village green,
The way I always loved her beats all you ever seen.
Chorus

Angeline the baker, her age is forty-three,
Fed her sugar candy and she still won’t marry me.
Chorus

Her father is the miller, they call him Uncle Sam,
I never will forget her, unless I take a dram.
Chorus

Angeline is handsome, Angeline is tall,
They say she sprained her ankle a-dancing at the ball.
Chorus

She can't do hard work because she is not stout,
She bakes her biscuits every day, and pours the coffee out.
Chorus

I'll never marry no other girl, no matter where I go.
I said I'd marry Angeline just twenty years ago.
Chorus

The last time I saw her was at the county fair.
Her father run me almost home and told me to stay there.
Chorus

== Notable performers ==
- John Nicholas Hendershot and The Memphis Birdmen
- Dry Branch Fire Squad
- Crooked Still
- The Norfolk Broads
- Nelson Eddy 1949
- 2nd South Carolina String Band
