= Ring, Ring de Banjo =

American minstrel song

Song
- Published: 1851
- Songwriter: Stephen Foster

Ring, Ring de Banjo is a minstrel song written in 1851. The song's words and music are from Stephen Foster.

The song, written to mimic Southern U.S. Black dialect, is in the perspective of a newly freed slave who returns to his old master's plantation to play his banjo on the man's deathbed. It is one of "minstrelsy's most explicit evocations of the potentially violent relationship in slavery between master and slave" and inspired a number of imitators, including the abolitionist Harriet Beecher Stowe.
