= Dana H. =

2019 play written by Lucas Hnath

- Original language: English
- Written by: Lucas Hnath

Premiere
- Date: May 29, 2019
- Place: Kirk Douglas Theatre

Dana H. is a play written by Lucas Hnath, based on the real-life experiences of Hnath's mother Dana Higginbotham. It premiered on Broadway in 2021, winning two Tony Awards.

== Synopsis ==
Dana, a chaplain in a psychiatric ward, encounters a magnetic patient — an ex-convict on a desperate quest for redemption. In a harrowing true story, Dana is taken captive, her life entirely in his hands, and held for five months across a chain of Florida motels, disoriented and terrified.

The play is told in Dana’s own words and adapted for the stage by her son. Throughout the show, real audio recordings of Hnath's mother play while the actress mouths the words.

== Production History ==
The play premiered at the Kirk Douglas Theatre in Culver City, California in previews on May 26, 2019 and officially on June 2. The production was directed by Les Waters and starred Deirdre O'Connell.

The play premiered on Broadway at the Lyceum Theatre in repertory with the Tina Satter play Is This a Room, premiering in previews on October 1, 2021 and officially on October 17. The production received acclaim from critics, with New York Times theatre critic Jesse Green praising the "disturbing" play and O'Connell's performance, praising her for "brilliantly pulling off one of the strangest and most difficult challenges ever asked of an actor."

The production closed on November 28 after 25 performances and 10 previews. The play received three Tony Award nominations, winning for Best Actress in a Play (O'Connell) and Best Sound Design of a Play (Mikhail Fiksel).

== Awards and nominations ==
Year	Award	Category	Nominee	Result	Ref.
2022	Tony Award	Best Actress in a Play	Deirdre O'Connell	Won	
2022	Tony Award	Best Direction of a Play	Les Waters	Nominated	
2022	Tony Award	Best Sound Design of a Play	Mikhail Fiksel	Won	
2022	Drama League Award	Outstanding Production of a Play		Nominated	
2022	Drama League Award	Distinguished Performance	Deirdre O'Connell	Nominated	
2022	Drama League Award	Outstanding Direction of a Play	Les Waters	Nominated	
