= Nathan Tysen =

American lyricist

Nathan Tysen (born January 15, 1977) is a Grammy-nominated American songwriter whose musicals have appeared on Broadway and the West End. Musicals with composer Chris Miller include Tuck Everlasting, The Burnt Part Boys, Fugitive Songs, Revival, Dreamland, and The Mysteries of Harris Burdick. He also collaborated with songwriter Daniel Messé of the band Hem on lyrics for the Broadway musical Amélie starring Phillipa Soo, and the reworked Olivier-nominated original London cast production starring Audrey Brisson. Television work includes songs for Sesame Street, Elmo's World, and the Electric Company. He also wrote lyrics for the digital murder mystery A Killer Party.

== Biography ==
Tysen was born in Kingston, New York and spent his infancy in Woodstock, New York. He moved to Salina, Kansas when he was three. He graduated from Salina High School South, to study at Missouri State University with a BFA in musical theatre. While attending MSU, he wrote his first musical, Noah's Art with composer Ryan McCall. In 1999, Tysen moved to New York City and received his MFA at New York University's Graduate Musical Theatre Writing Program. It was at NYU that Tysen started collaborating with Miller. Their thesis musical, The Burnt Part Boys, was given a world premiere at Barrington Stage Company, and a subsequent Off-Broadway run at Playwrights Horizons produced in conjunction with Vineyard Theatre. Tysen has written several musicals with Miller, most notably the adaptation of the popular young adult novel Tuck Everlasting by Natalie Babbitt. He is also an accomplished writer and performer of children's music, penning tunes for Sesame Street, Elmo's World, The Electric Company, Storytime By Design, and Little Maestros. He has worked for over two decades writing and directing for the Lovewell Institute for the Creative Arts, helping create numerous new musicals with young adults. He plays in the band Joe's Pet Project.

== Works ==
- The Great Gatsby (2023) Broadway try-out. Music and orchestrations by Jason Howland. Book by Kait Kerrigan. Direction by Marc Bruni. Choreography by Dominique Kelley.
- Amélie (2020) West End production. Music by Dan Messé. Book by Craig Lucas. Direction by Michael Fentiman. New Orchestrations by Barnaby Race.
- Dreamland (or a musical riff on Shakespeare's Midsummer set during the declassification of Area 51). (2019) In development. Commission from Concord Theatricals. World-premiere reading at the International Thespian Festival, first showing at Salina High School South, Direction by Kate Lindsay.
- Revival (2019) In development. Co-commission from Playwrights Horizons and Theatreworks Silicon Valley.
- Paradise Square (2019) World premiere at Berkeley Repertory Theatre. Music by Jason Howland and Larry Kirwan. Choreography by Bill T. Jones. Direction by Moises Kaufman.
- Amélie (2017) Broadway production. Music by Dan Messé. Book by Craig Lucas. Choreography by Sam Pinkleton. Direction by Pam MacKinnon.
- Tuck Everlasting (June 2013) Pre-Broadway world premiere at Boston's Colonial Theatre, produced by Broadway Across America and Barry Brown. Book by Claudia Shear. Direction by Casey Nicholaw
- Circus Xtreme (2015) Ringling Bros. Barnum & Bailey US tour. Book by Miller & Tysen. Direction by Michael Schwandt.
- Stillwater (2015) Lab production at Kansas City Repertory Theatre. Music by Joe's Pet Project.
- Circus Superheroes (2014) Ringling Bros. Barnum & Bailey US tour. Book by Miller & Tysen. Direction by Michael Schwandt.
- Stars of David (2013) Off-Broadway production. Songs written with Chris Miller and Daniel Messé.
- The Burnt Part Boys (2010) Off-Broadway co-production by Playwrights Horizons and Vineyard Theatre. World premiere at Barrington Stage Company (2006). Book by Mariana Elder. Direction by Joe Calarco
- Fugitive Songs (2009) Off-Broadway production by Dreamlight Theatre Company
- The Mysteries of Harris Burdick (2008) World premiere at Barrington Stage Company. Book and Direction by Joe Calarco
- Noah's Art (2003) Various collegiate and high school productions. Music by Ryan McCall. Book and Lyrics by Nathan Tysen

== Awards and recognition ==
- Tony Nomination for Best Original Score (2022) Paradise Square
- Grammy Nomination for Best Musical Theatre Album (2020) Amélie - Original London Cast
- Olivier Nominations for Best Musical, Best Actress - Audrey Brisson, Best Original Score or New Orchestrations (2020) Amélie
- Samuel French Next Step Award (2017)
- Drama League Nomination for Best Musical (2017) Amélie
- Outer Critics Award for Best Musical (2016) Tuck Everlasting
- Drama League Nomination for Best Musical Tuck Everlasting
- Kleban Award (2014)
- Fred Ebb Award (2014)
- Lucille Lortel Nomination for Best Musical (2010) The Burnt Part Boys
- Edgerton Foundation New American Play Award (2009) The Burnt Part Boys
- Berkshire Eagle “Best of the Decade” (2009) The Mysteries of Harris Burdick
- Drama Desk Nomination for Best New Revue (2008) Fugitive Songs
- Boston Globe “Top Ten Pick of 2008” The Mysteries of Harris Burdick
- NEA Grant (2008) The Burnt Part Boys
- Kitty Carlisle Hart Musical Theatre Award (2007)
- Richard Rodgers Award (2006) True Fans
- American Theatre Critics New Play Award Finalist (2006) The Burnt Part Boys
- Darryl Roth Creative Spirit Award (2004) True Fans
- Frederick Loewe Foundation Grant (2004) The Mysteries of Harris Burdick
- Jonathan Larson Performing Arts Foundation Grant (2003)
- 2002 Max Dreyfus ASCAP Award for outstanding voice in musical theatre

== Recordings ==
- AMÉLIE, Original London Cast Recording, Craft Recordings & Concord Theatricals, Released 2020 (Lyrics)
- A KILLER PARTY, Original Cast Recording, Broadway Records, Released 2020 (Lyrics)
- AMÉLIE, Original Broadway Cast Recording, Rhino Warner Classics, Released 2017 (Lyrics)
- TUCK EVERLASTING, Original Broadway Cast Recording, DMI Soundtracks, Released 2016 (Lyrics)
- FUGITIVE SONGS, Studio Cast Recording, Yellow Sound Label, Released 2012 (Lyrics)
- STARS OF DAVID, World Premiere Recording, Yellow Sound Label, Released 2014 (Lyrics)
- THE BURNT PART BOYS, Off-Broadway Cast Recording, Yellow Sound Label, Released 2011 (Lyrics)
- BLUE BOTTLE COLLECTION: SUMMER OF THE SODA FOUNTAIN GIRLS, Yellow Sound Label, 2011 (Guitar, Vocals, Harmonica)
- HALLE & THE JILT: LUCKY YOU, Independent Release 2011 (Harmonica)
- IT'S A STORYTIME JAM, Vol. 1, Storytime By Design, SBD Music, 2010 (Vocals, Music & Lyrics)
- NIGEL RICHARDS: A SHINING TRUTH, Symble Records, 2009 (Lyrics)
- LITTLE MAESTROS: POSTCARDS FROM MY MIND, Kid Rhino Records/Warner Music, 2008 (Music & Lyrics, Vocals)
- LITTLE MAESTROS: WORD IS ON THE PLAYGROUND, Kid Rhino Records/Warner Music, 2007 (Music & Lyrics, Vocals)
- LITTLE MAESTROS: WELCOME HOME TO MAESTROVILLE, Kid Rhino Records/Warner Music, 2006 (Vocals)
- NEO: A Celebration of Emerging Talent in Musical Theatre, Benefiting the York Theatre Company, Jay Records, 2005 (Lyrics)
