= New York Theatre Workshop =

Off-Broadway theater in New York City

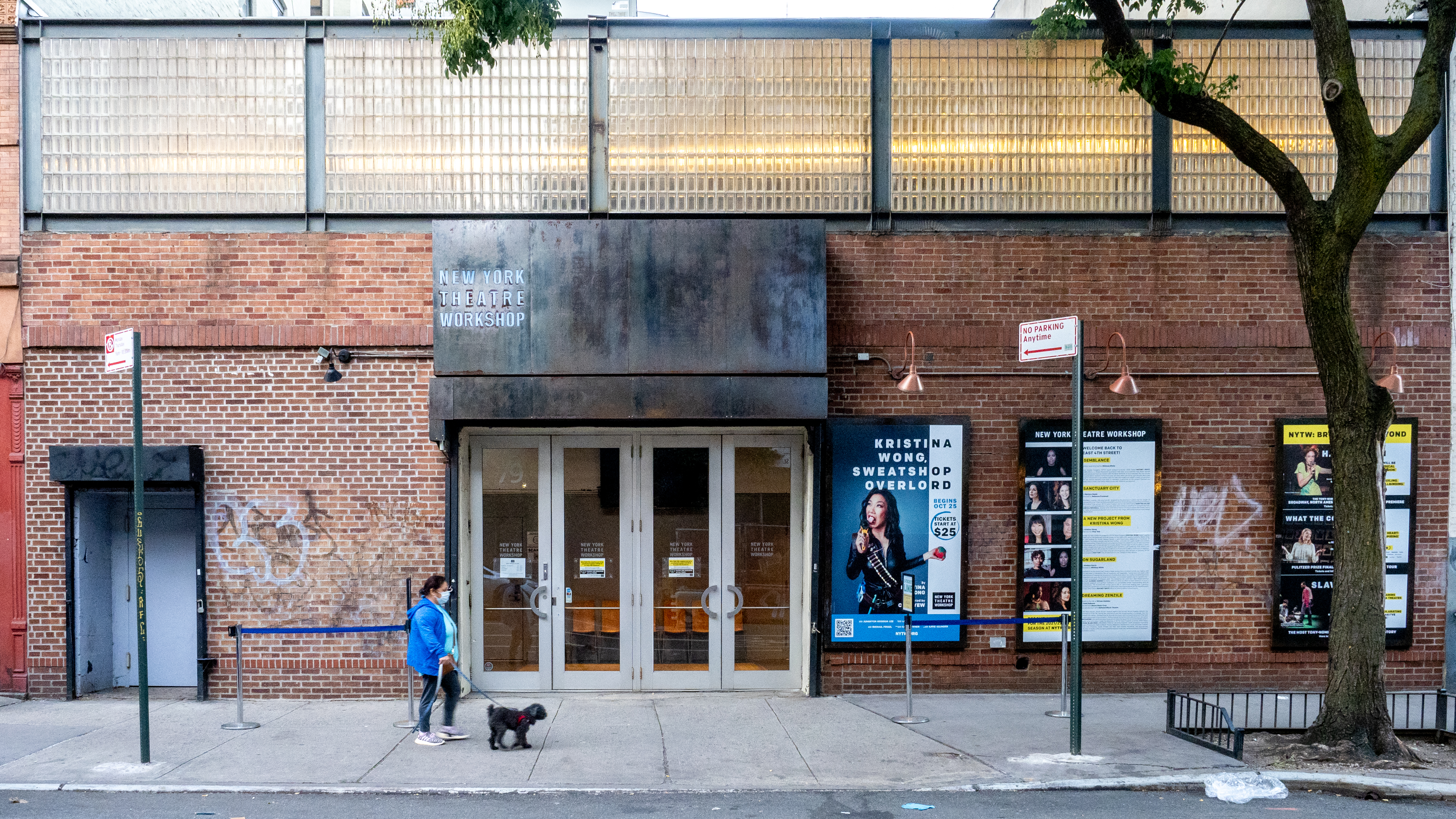
- The entrance to NYTW's mainstage
- Interactive map of New York Theatre Workshop
- Address: 79-83 East 4th Street; New York City; United States
- Coordinates: 40°43′36″N 73°59′24″W
- Owner: New York Theatre Workshop, Inc.
- Capacity: main stage: 198 black box: 75
- Type: Off-Broadway

Construction
- Opened: 1979

Website
- www.nytw.org

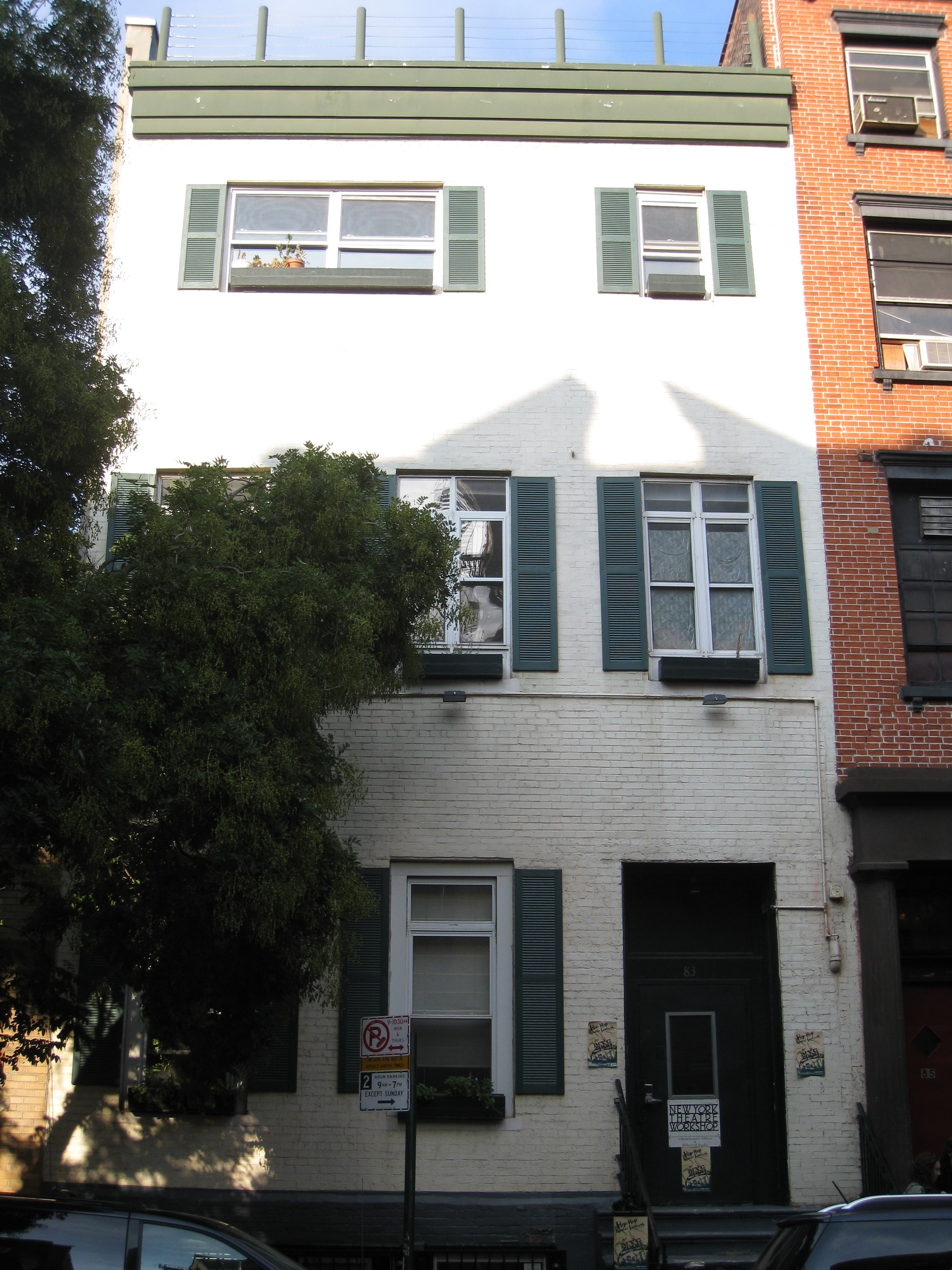
The building next to the mainstage houses a black box theatre, offices and rehearsal spaces

New York Theatre Workshop (NYTW) is an Off-Broadway theater noted for its productions of new works. Located at 79 East 4th Street between Second Avenue and Bowery in the East Village neighborhood of Manhattan, New York City, it houses a 198-seat theater for its mainstage productions, and a 75-seat black box theatre for staged readings and developing work in the building next door, at 83 East 4th Street.

== History ==
Founded by Stephen Graham, NYTW presents five to seven new productions, over 80 staged readings, and numerous workshop productions to an audience of over 60,000 patrons.

Some of the theatre's progeny – such as Rent and Dirty Blonde – have transferred to commercial productions. The new works of well-established playwrights, such as Caryl Churchill, Doug Wright, and Tony Kushner – a former NYTW associate artistic director – have also been produced at NYTW. In keeping with its mission, NYTW continues to bring new work from theatre legends and emerging artists alike. The theatre maintains connections with many theatrical artists, whom it refers to as "The Usual Suspects".

In 2005, NYTW purchased a vacant building at 72 East 4th Street, which it converted into scenic and costume shops. On January 11, 2006, Mayor Michael Bloomberg donated several city-owned buildings to arts organizations, including New York Theatre Workshop, on East Fourth Street, designating the block Fourth Arts Block.

James C. Nicola served as its artistic director from 1988 to June 2022. He was succeeded by Patricia McGregor in August 2022.

== Affiliated artists ==
- Alan Ball, writer/director
- Anne Bogart, director
- Rachel Chavkin, director
- Caryl Churchill, writer
- Martha Clarke, writer/director/choreographer
- Daniel Craig, performer
- Rinde Eckert, writer/composer
- Elevator Repair Service, performance group
- The Five Lesbian Brothers, performance group
- Deb Filler, writer/ performer
- Les Freres Corbusier, performance group
- David Gordon, director/choreographer/writer
- Tony Kushner, writer
- Theater Mitu, performance group, company-in-residence
- Jonathan Larson, writer/composer
- Charles L. Mee, writer
- Will Power, writer
- Paul Rudnick, writer
- Claudia Shear, writer/performer
- Ivo van Hove, director
- Naomi Wallace, writer
- Doug Wright, writer/performer
- UNIVERSES, writers/performance ensemble
