= Roald Dahl short stories bibliography =

List of short stories written by Roald Dahl

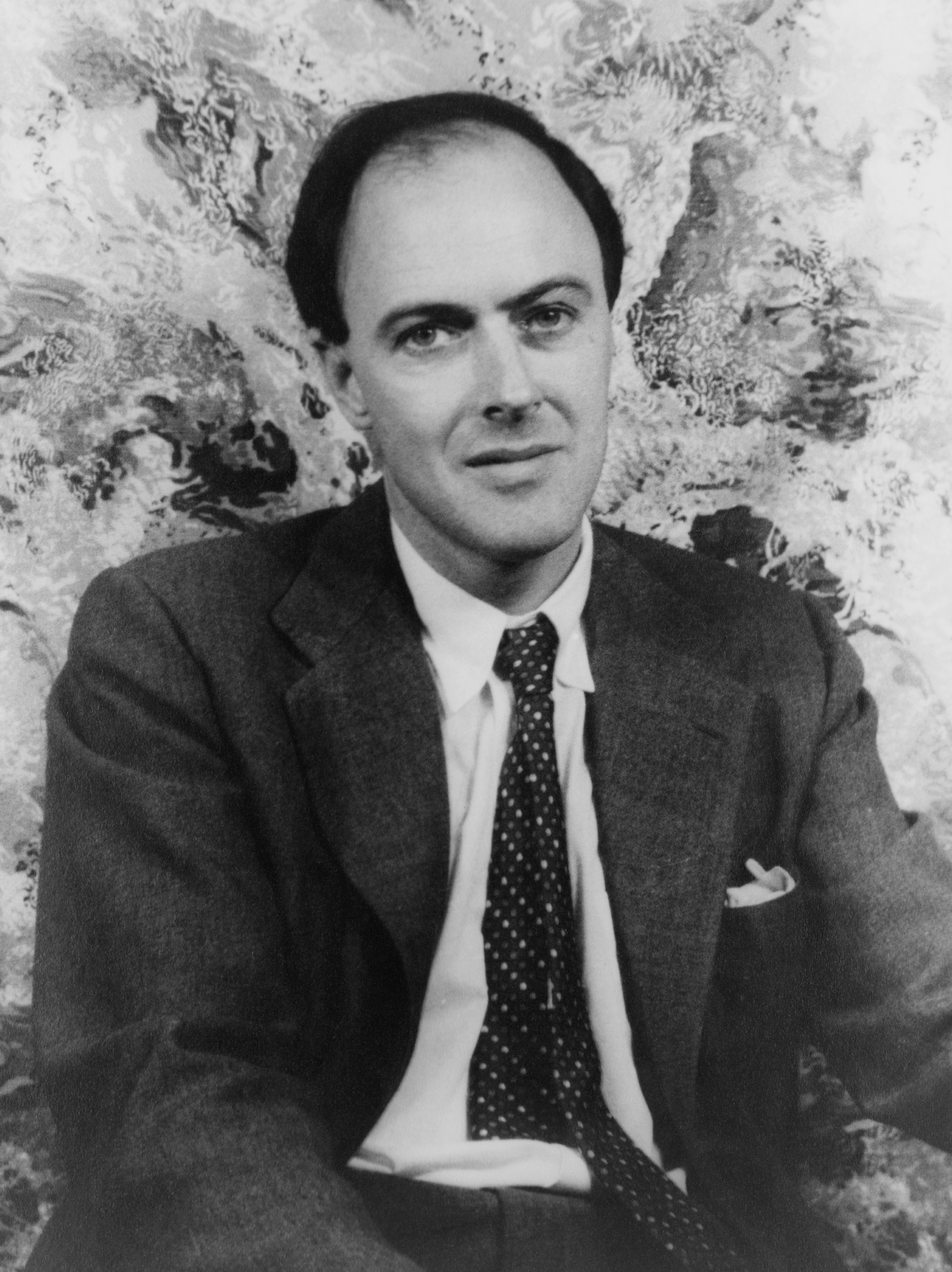
Roald Dahl in 1954

Roald Dahl short stories bibliography is a comprehensive annotated list of short stories written by Roald Dahl.

== Short stories ==
Title	First published	Collected in	Notes
"A Piece of Cake"	Saturday Evening Post (1 August 1942) as "Shot Down Over Libya"	Over to You, Henry Sugar	Initially published as two different stories: "Shot Down Over Libya" and "Missing: Believed Killed"
"The Gremlins"	Cosmopolitan (December 1942)		Published under the pen name "Pegasus"
"The Sword"	Atlantic Monthly (August 1943)		Reworked as a vignette in Going Solo
"Katina"	Ladies Home Journal (March 1944)	Over to You, Grammatizator	
"Only This"	Ladies Home Journal (September 1944)	Over to You	
"Beware of the Dog"	Harper's (October 1944)	Over to You, Skin	
"Missing: Believed Killed"	Tomorrow (November 1944)		Reworked and combined with "Shot Down Over Libya" as "A Piece of Cake"
"They Shall Not Grow Old"	Ladies Home Journal (March 1945)	Over to You	
"Madame Rosette"	Harper's (August 1945)	Over to You; Best	
"Death of an Old Old Man"	Ladies Home Journal (September 1945)	Over to You	
"Someone Like You"	Town & Country (November 1945)	Over to You	
"The Mildenhall Treasure"	Saturday Evening Post (20 September 1947)	Henry Sugar	First published as He Plowed Up $1,000,000
"Man from the South"	Collier's Magazine (September 1948)	Tales, Someone Like You, Grammatizator; Best	alternative titles: "Collector's Item", "The Smoker"
"The Sound Machine"	The New Yorker (17 September 1949)	More Tales, Someone Like You, Skin; Best	
"Poison"	Collier's (3 June 1950)	More Tales, Someone Like You	
"Girl Without a Name"	Today's Woman (November 1951)		Working title "Meet My Sister"; republished in Woman's Journal in December 1951.
"Taste"	The New Yorker (8 December 1951)	Tales, Someone Like You, Grammatizator; Best	
"Dip in the Pool"	The New Yorker (19 January 1952)	Tales, Someone Like You, Skin; Best	
"Skin"	The New Yorker (17 May 1952)	Tales, Someone Like You, Skin; Best	Initially published as "A Picture for Drioli"
"My Lady Love, My Dove"	The New Yorker (21 June 1952)	Tales, Someone Like You, Skin	
"Mr. Feasey"	The New Yorker (August 1953)	Someone Like You, Sweet Mystery; Best	Initially published as "Dog Race". Sometimes "Mr. Feasey", "Mr. Hoddy", Rummins", "The Champion of the World", and "The Ratcatcher" are collected as "Claud's Dog"
"Lamb to the Slaughter"	Harper's (September 1953)	Tales, Someone Like You, Skin; Best	Illustrated by Adolf Hallman
"Nunc Dimittis"	Collier's (September 1953)	Tales, Someone Like You	Initially published as "The Devious Bachelor"
"Edward the Conqueror"	The New Yorker (31 October 1953)	Kiss Kiss, Tales; Best	
"Galloping Foxley"	Town & Country (November 1953)	Tales, Someone Like You, Skin; Best	
"The Way Up to Heaven"	The New Yorker (27 February 1954)	Kiss Kiss, Tales, Grammatizator; Best	
"Parson's Pleasure"	Esquire (April 1958)	Kiss Kiss, Tales, Grammatizator, Sweet Mystery; Best	
"The Champion of the World"	The New Yorker (31 January 1959)	Kiss Kiss, Skin, Sweet Mystery; Best	Sometimes "Mr. Feasey", "Mr. Hoddy", Rummins", "The Champion of the World", and "The Ratcatcher" are collected as "Claud's Dog"
"The Landlady"	The New Yorker (28 November 1959)	Kiss Kiss, Tales, Grammatizator; Best	
"Mrs. Bixby and the Colonel's Coat"	Nugget (December 1959)	Kiss Kiss, Tales, Grammatizator; Best	
"Genesis and Catastrophe: A True Story"	Playboy (December 1959)	Kiss Kiss, More Tales; Best	Initially published as "A Fine Son"
"In the Ruins"	Program of the World Book Fair (June 1964)		Set in a post-apocalyptic era
"The Visitor"	Playboy (May 1965)	Switch Bitch; Best	
"The Last Act"	Playboy (January 1966)	Switch Bitch	
"The Great Switcheroo"	Playboy (April 1974)	Switch Bitch; Best	
"The Butler"	Travel and Leisure (May 1974)	More Tales, Grammatizator	Initially published as "The Butler Did It"
"Bitch"	Playboy (July 1974)	Switch Bitch	
"Ah, Sweet Mystery of Life"	The Daily Telegraph (1974)	Ah, Sweet Mystery of Life	
"The Hitch-Hiker"	Atlantic Monthly (July 1977)	More Tales, Henry Sugar; Best	
"The Umbrella Man"	More Tales of the Unexpected (1980)	More Tales, Grammatizator; Best	
"Mr. Botibol"	More Tales of the Unexpected (1980)	More Tales	
"Vengeance is Mine Inc."	More Tales (1980)	More Tales, Grammatizator	
"Princess and the Poacher"	Two Fables (1986)	Two Fables	
"Princess Mammalia"	Two Fables (1986)	Two Fables	
"The Bookseller"	Playboy (January 1987)	Best	
"The Surgeon"	Playboy (January 1988)	Skin	
"Death in the Square: A Christmas Mystery in Four Parts" [Part 1 by Dahl]	Telegraph Weekend Magazine (24 December 1988, pp36–40)		
"An African Story"		Over to You, Skin	
"Yesterday Was Beautiful"		Over to You	
"The Boy Who Talked with Animals"		Henry Sugar; Best	
"Georgy Porgy"		Kiss Kiss, More Tales; Best	
"The Great Automatic Grammatizator"		Someone Like You, Grammatizator	
"Lucky Break"		Henry Sugar	
"Mr. Hoddy"		Someone Like You, Sweet Mystery; Best	Sometimes "Mr. Feasey", "Mr. Hoddy", Rummins", "The Champion of the World", and "The Ratcatcher" are collected as "Claud's Dog"
"Neck"		Tales, Someone Like You, Grammatizator	
"Pig"		Kiss Kiss; Best	
"The Ratcatcher"		Someone Like You, Sweet Mystery; Best	Sometimes "Mr. Feasey", "Mr. Hoddy", Rummins", "The Champion of the World", and "The Ratcatcher" are collected as "Claud's Dog"
"Royal Jelly"		Kiss Kiss, Tales, Grammatizator; Best	
"Rummins"		Someone Like You, Sweet Mystery; Best	Sometimes "Mr. Feasey", "Mr. Hoddy", Rummins", "The Champion of the World", and "The Ratcatcher" are collected as "Claud's Dog"
"The Soldier"	Someone Like You (1953)	Someone Like You	
"The Swan"		Henry Sugar	
"William and Mary"		Kiss Kiss, Tales; Best	
"The Wish"	Someone Like You (1953)	Someone Like You, Skin	
"The Wonderful Story of Henry Sugar"		Henry Sugar; Best	

== Collections ==
- — (1946). Over to You: Ten Stories of Flyers and Flying. USA: Reynal & Hitchcock.
  - — (1973). Over to You: Ten Stories of Flyers and Flying (Reprinted ed.). London: Penguin. ISBN 978-0140035742.
- — (1953). Someone Like You. Knopf.
  - — (1984). Someone Like You (Rev. and expanded ed.). Harmondsworth: Penguin. ISBN 978-0140030747.
- — (1960). Kiss Kiss. Knopf.
  - — (1962). Kiss Kiss. Harmondsworth, Middlesex, England: Penguin Books.
- — (1974). Switch Bitch. New York: Alfred A. Knopf. ISBN 978-0394494739.
  - — (2012). Switch Bitch (Reissue ed.). London: Michael Joseph. ISBN 978-0241955727.
- — (1977). The Wonderful Story of Henry Sugar and Six More. London: Jonathan Cape. ISBN 978-0224015479.
- — (1980). Tales of the Unexpected (Repr. ed.). Harmondsworth, Middlesex, England: Penguin. ISBN 0-14-005131-7.
- — (1980). More Tales of the Unexpected (First ed.). London: Penguin Books. ISBN 978-0140056068.
- — (1986). Two Fables. With illustrations by Graham Dean (First ed.). Harmondsworth, Middlesex, England: Viking/Penguin. ISBN 978-0670815302.
- — (1989). Ah, Sweet Mystery of Life. London: Michael Joseph. ISBN 978-0140118476.
- — (2001). The great automatic grammatizator and other stories. London: Puffin. ISBN 978-0141311500.
- — (2002). Skin and Other Stories. New York: Puffin. ISBN 978-0141310343.

=== Omnibus editions ===
- — (1978). The Best of Roald Dahl: stories from Over to You, Someone Like You, Kiss Kiss, Switch Bitch. New York: Vintage Books. ISBN 978-0394725499.
- — (1986). The Roald Dahl Omnibus. New York: Dorset Press. ISBN 978-0880291248.
- — (1991). The Collected Short Stories of Roald Dahl. London: Michael Joseph. ISBN 978-0708987421.
  - — (2006). Roald Dahl: Collected Stories (Reissue from 1991 ed.). New York: Alfred A. Knopf. ISBN 978-0307264909.
- — (1997). The Roald Dahl Treasury. London: Jonathan Cape. ISBN 978-0224046916.
- — (2013). The Complete Short Stories: Volume One (1944–1953). London: Michael Joseph. ISBN 978-1405910101.
- — (2013). The Complete Short Stories: Volume Two (1954–1988). London: Michael Joseph. ISBN 978-1405910118.
