= Roald Dahl bibliography =

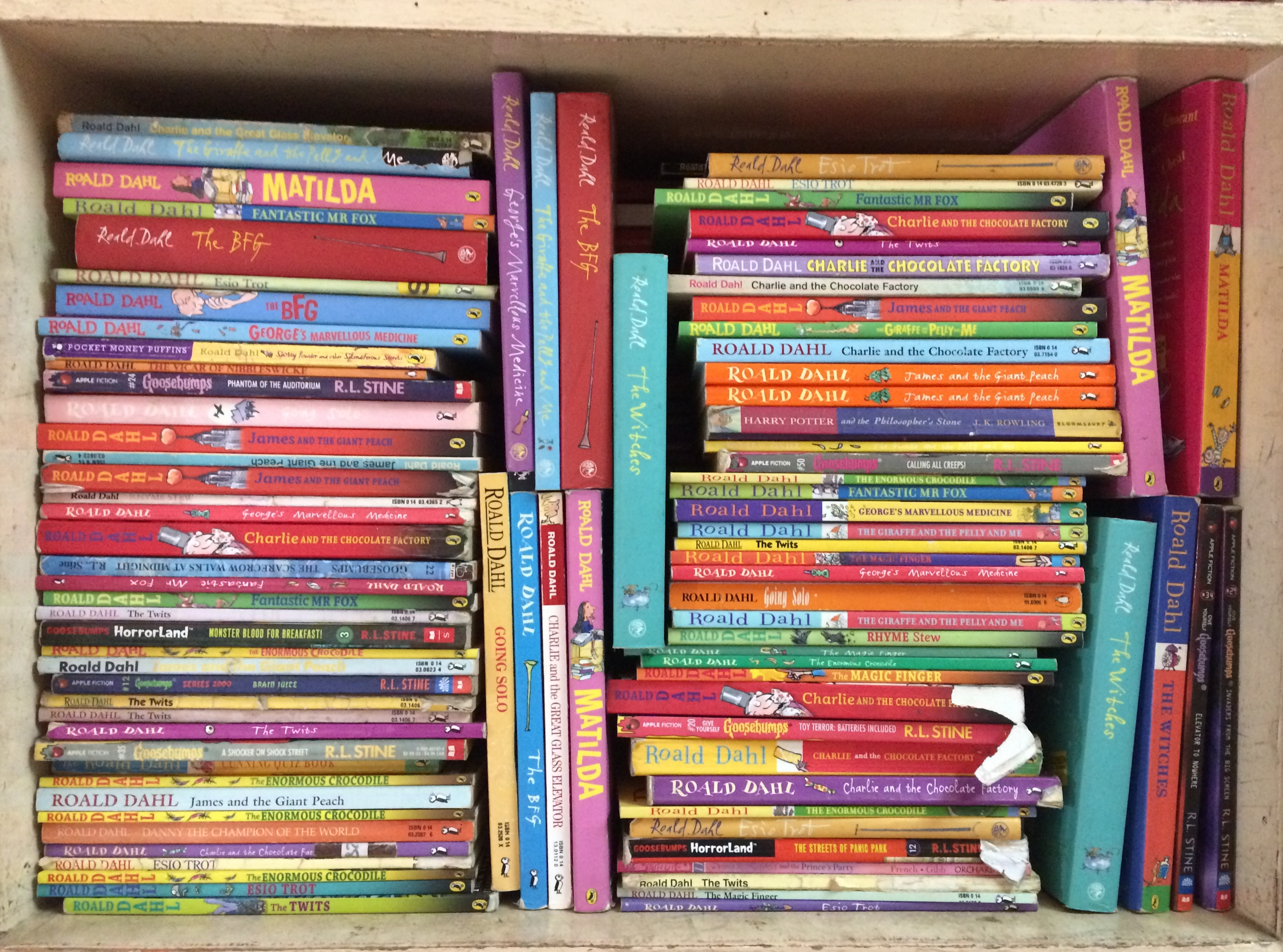
- Bookshelf with stacks of books by Roald Dahl
- Novels↙: 19
- Collections↙: 13
- Poems↙: 3
- Scripts↙: 12
- Books edited↙: 1
- Non-fiction↙: 9

Roald Dahl (1916–1990) was a British author and scriptwriter, and "the most popular writer of children's books since Enid Blyton", according to Philip Howard, the literary editor of The Times.

Dahl wrote his first story for children, The Gremlins, in 1943; the story was also written for Walt Disney, who was interested in turning it into a film that was ultimately never made. This was Roald Dahl's first children's book published, though it was originally not written as such. Dahl continued to write short stories, although these were all aimed at the adult market. Dahl worked for periodicals as a short story contributor. Other stories were sold to magazines and newspapers, and were later compiled into collections, the first of which was published in 1946. Dahl began to make up bedtime stories for his children, and these formed the basis of several of his stories. His first novel intentionally written for children, James and the Giant Peach, was published in 1961, which was followed, along with others, by Charlie and the Chocolate Factory (1964), Fantastic Mr Fox (1970), Danny, the Champion of the World (1975), The BFG (1982) and Matilda in 1988.

Dahl's first script was for a stage work, The Honeys, which appeared on Broadway in 1955. He followed this with a television script, "Lamb to the Slaughter", for the Alfred Hitchcock Presents series. He co-wrote screenplays for film, including for You Only Live Twice (1967) and Chitty Chitty Bang Bang (1968). In 1982 Dahl published the first of three editions of poems aimed at children. The following year he edited a book of ghost stories. He wrote several works of non-fiction, including three autobiographies, a cookery book, a safety leaflet for the British railways and a book on measles, which was about the death of his daughter Olivia from measles encephalitis.

As at 2019, Dahl's works have been translated into 63 languages and have sold more than 200 million books worldwide. Dahl was known as “The World’s No. 1 Story-teller” due to how his books are praised in large part for celebrating nonsense, imagination, and creativity. It is considered that because of this his books are still popular with children. His awards for contribution to literature include the 1983 World Fantasy Award for Life Achievement, and the British Book Awards' Children's Author of the Year in 1990. In 2008 The Times placed Dahl 16th on its list of "The 50 greatest British writers since 1945". He has been referred to by The Independent as "one of the greatest storytellers for children of the 20th century". On his death in 1990, journalist Philip Howard considered him "one of the most widely read and influential writers of our generation".

== Novels ==
Dahl's novels
Title	Year of first publication	First edition publisher	Scope
The Gremlins	1943	Random House, New York	Children
Sometime Never: A Fable for Supermen (Note: Also published as Some Time Never: A Fable for Supermen.)	1948	Charles Scribner's Sons, New York	Adult
James and the Giant Peach	1961	Alfred A. Knopf, New York	Children
Charlie and the Chocolate Factory	1964	Alfred A. Knopf, New York	Children
The Magic Finger	1966	Harper & Row, New York	Children
Fantastic Mr Fox	1970	Alfred A. Knopf, New York	Children
Charlie and the Great Glass Elevator	1972	Alfred A. Knopf, New York	Children
Danny, the Champion of the World	1975	Alfred A. Knopf, New York	Children
The Enormous Crocodile	1978	Alfred A. Knopf, New York	Children
My Uncle Oswald	1979	Michael Joseph, London	Adult
The Twits	1980	Jonathan Cape, London	Children
George's Marvellous Medicine	1981	Jonathan Cape, London	Children
The BFG	1982	Farrar, Straus and Giroux, New York	Children
The Witches	1983	Farrar, Straus and Giroux, New York	Children
The Giraffe and the Pelly and Me	1985	Farrar, Straus and Giroux, New York	Children
Matilda	1988	Viking Kestrel, New York	Children
Esio Trot	1990	Jonathan Cape, London	Children
The Vicar of Nibbleswicke	1991	Century, London	Children
The Minpins	1991	Jonathan Cape, London	Children

== Short story collections ==
Dahl's short story collections
Title	Year of first publication	First edition publisher	Scope
Over to You: Ten Stories of Flyers and Flying	1946	Reynal & Hitchcock, New York	Adult
Someone Like You	1953	Alfred A. Knopf, New York	Adult
Kiss Kiss	1960	Alfred A. Knopf, New York	Adult
Twenty-Nine Kisses from Roald Dahl (Note: Comprises Someone Like You and Kiss Kiss.)	1969	Michael Joseph, London	Adult
Switch Bitch	1974	Alfred A. Knopf, New York	Adult
The Wonderful Story of Henry Sugar and Six More	1977	Jonathan Cape, London	Children
The Best of Roald Dahl	1978	Vintage Books, New York	Adult
Tales of the Unexpected	1979	Michael Joseph, London	Adult
More Tales of the Unexpected	1980	Michael Joseph, London	Adult
A Roald Dahl Selection: Nine Short Stories	1980	Longmans, London	Adult
Two Fables	1986	Viking Press, London	Adult
Ah, Sweet Mystery of Life: The Country Stories of Roald Dahl	1989	Michael Joseph, London	Adult
The Roald Dahl Treasury	1997	Jonathan Cape, London	Children
Madness: Tales of Fear and Unreason	2016	Penguin Books, London	Adult
Lust: Tales of Craving and Desire	2016	Penguin Books, London	Adult
Cruelty: Tales of Malice and Greed	2016	Penguin Books, London	Adult
Deception: Tales of Intrigue and Lies	2016	Penguin Books, London	Adult
Trickery: Tales of Deceit and Cunning	2017	Penguin Books, London	Adult
War: Tales of Conflict and Strife	2017	Penguin Books, London	Adult
Fear: Tales of Terror and Suspense	2017	Penguin Books, London	Adult
Innocence: Tales of Youth and Guile	2017	Penguin Books, London	Adult

== Scripts ==
Many of Dahl's works were used as the basis for films or television programmes. The following are where he is credited as the writer of the performed script.

Dahl's scripts
Title	Year of first publication or production	First edition publisher, where relevant	Media	Notes
The Honeys	1955	–	Stage work	Produced at the Longacre Theatre on Broadway.
Alfred Hitchcock Presents: "Lamb to the Slaughter"	1958	–	Television script	
Way Out: "William and Mary"	1961	–	Television script	Also introduced by Dahl on CBS
You Only Live Twice	1967	–	Film script	With Jack Bloom
Chitty Chitty Bang Bang	1968	–	Film script	With Ken Hughes
Willy Wonka & the Chocolate Factory	1971	–	Film script	
The Night Digger	1971	–	Film script	
The BFG: Plays for Children	1976	Puffin Books, London	Stage work	
Charlie and the Chocolate Factory: A Play	1976	Puffin Books, London	Stage work	
James and the Giant Peach: A Play	1982	Puffin Books, London	Stage work	
Charlie and the Great Glass Elevator: A Play	1984	Allen & Unwin, London	Stage work	
Fantastic Mr Fox: A Play	1987	Puffin Books, London	Stage work	

== Poems ==
Dahl's poetry
Title	Year of first publication	First edition publisher
Revolting Rhymes	1982	Jonathan Cape, (London)
Dirty Beasts	1983	Jonathan Cape, (London)
Rhyme Stew	1989	Jonathan Cape, (London)
Songs and Verse	2005	Jonathan Cape, (London)
Vile Verses	2005	Viking Juvenile, (New York)

== Books edited ==
Dahl's work as an editor
Title	Year of first publication	First edition publisher	Description	Notes
Roald Dahl's Book of Ghost Stories	1983	Jonathan Cape, London	Adult; short story collection	Editor only

== Non-fiction ==
Dahl's works of non-fiction
Title	Year of first publication	First edition publisher	Scope	Notes
Boy: Tales of Childhood	1984	Jonathan Cape, London	Autobiography	
Going Solo	1986	Jonathan Cape, London	Autobiography	
Measles, a Dangerous Illness	1988	Sandwell Health Authority	Medical/Autobiographical	About the death of his daughter Olivia from measles encephalitis
Memories with Food at Gipsy House	1991	Viking Press, London	Cook book	With Felicity Dahl; reissued in softcover in 1996 as Roald Dahl's Cookbook
Roald Dahl's Guide to Railway Safety	1991	British Railways Board, London	Safety booklet	
The Dahl Diary 1992	1991	Puffin Books, London	Diary	
My Year	1993	Jonathan Cape, London	Autobiography	
The Roald Dahl Diary 1997	1996	Puffin Books, London	Diary	
The Mildenhall Treasure	1999	Jonathan Cape, London	History	First published in book form in The Wonderful Story of Henry Sugar and Six More before release in 1999 as a single title edition

== Notes and references ==
=== General and cited sources ===
- "Collecting Roald Dahl". The Book and Magazine Collector. No. 259. September 2005.
- Carrick, Robert (2002). "Roald Dahl". In Harris-Fain, Darren (ed.). Dictionary of Literary Biography: British Fantast and Science-Fiction Writers, 1918–1960. Detroit: Gale Research. ISBN 978-0-7876-5249-4.
- Conant, Jennet (2008). The Irregulars: Roald Dahl and the British Spy Ring in Wartime Washington. London: Simon and Schuster. ISBN 978-0-7432-9458-4.
- Dalby, Richard (April 1994). "The Adult Fiction of Roald Dahl". The Book and Magazine Collector. No. 121.
- Grigsby, John L (1994). "Roald Dahl". In Baldwin, Dean (ed.). Dictionary of Literary Biography: British Short-Fiction Writers, 1945–1980. Detroit: Gale Research. ISBN 978-0-8103-5398-5.
- Howard, Philip (2011). "Dahl, Roald". Oxford Dictionary of National Biography (online ed.). Oxford University Press. doi:10.1093/ref:odnb/39827.
- Sturrock, Donald (2010). Storyteller: The Life of Roald Dahl. London: HarperCollins Publishers. ISBN 978-0-00-739706-8.
- Walker, Richard (April 2002). "Roald Dahl: A Collector's Guide to his First Editions". The Book and Magazine Collector. No. 217.
- Walker, Richard (March 2004). "The Magazine Stories of Roald Dahl". The Book and Magazine Collector. No. 240.
