= The Collected Short Stories of Roald Dahl =

1991 short story collection by Roald Dahl

- First edition
- Author: Roald Dahl
- Publisher: Michael Joseph
- Publication date: 1991
- Publication place: United Kingdom
- Media type: hardback
- Pages: 762
- ISBN: 0-7181-3545-8

The Collected Short Stories of Roald Dahl is a 1991 short story collection for adults by Roald Dahl. The collection containing tales of macabre malevolence comprises many of Dahl's stories seen in the television series Tales of the Unexpected and previously collected in Someone Like You (1953), Kiss, Kiss (1960), Twenty-Nine Kisses from Roald Dahl (1969), Switch Bitch (1974), and Ah, Sweet Mystery of Life: The Country Stories of Roald Dahl (1989).

== See also ==
- Tales of the Unexpected
