= Roald Dahl: Collected Stories =

- First edition
- Author: Roald Dahl; Jeremy Treglown (editor)
- Language: English
- Series: Everyman's Library
- Genre: Short story Anthology, Science fiction, Mystery, Dark comedy
- Publisher: Random House
- Publication date: Sep 07, 2006 (UK); Oct 17, 2006 (US)
- Publication place: United Kingdom & United States
- Media type: Print (hardback)
- Pages: 888
- ISBN: 1-84159-300-1
- OCLC: 70060186

Roald Dahl: Collected Stories is a hardcover edition of short-stories by Roald Dahl for adults. It was published in the US in October 2006 by Random House as part of the Everyman's Library. It includes all Roald Dahl's stories in chronological order as established by Dahl's biographer, Jeremy Treglown, in consultation with the Dahl estate. A few of the short stories were not published chronologically in book form, but appeared later, collected in More Tales of the Unexpected (1980). The collection contains all of the short stories published in the following collections:

- Over to You: Ten Stories of Flyers and Flying (1946)
- Someone Like You (1953)
- Kiss Kiss (1959)
- Switch Bitch (1974)
- More Tales of the Unexpected (1980)
