= Over to You =

Over to You may refer to:

- Over to You: Ten Stories of Flyers and Flying, 1946 book by Roald Dahl
- "Over to You", a song from the 1978 studio album Never Say Die! by Black Sabbath
- Over To You, horse that was an Olympic medalist in equestrian for team eventing

== See also ==
- "Over To You Now", a song from the 2005 extended play Britney & Kevin: Chaotic by Britney Spears
