= London streets are paved with gold =

Ironic English expression for a "land of opportunity"

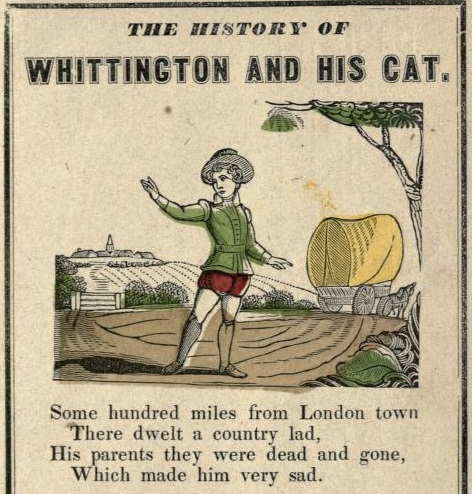
Dick Whittington heads for London, from a 1850s publication.

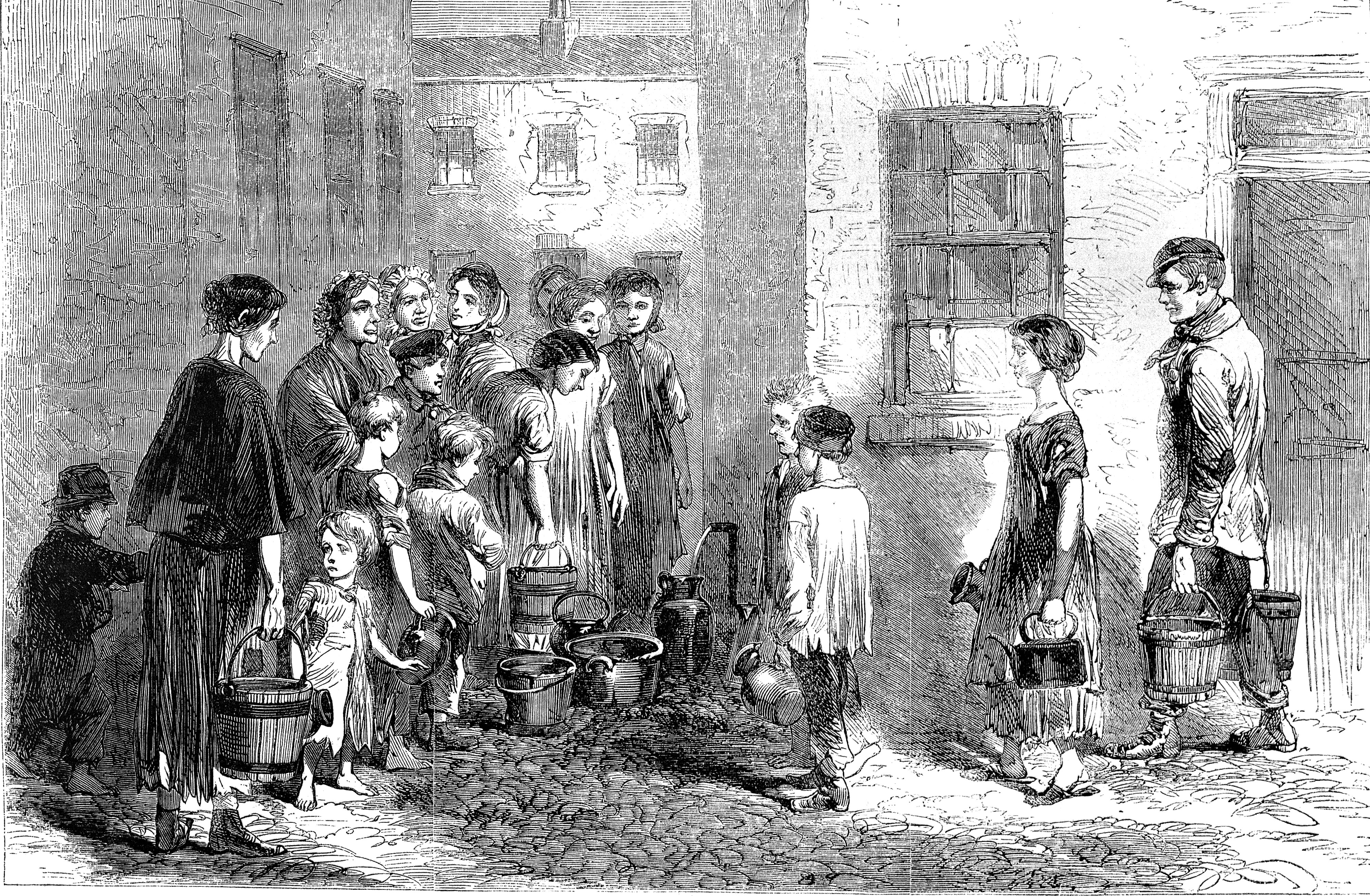
Slum dwellers queueing for water, 1863. Poverty, squalor and disease were more likely to be found in Victorian London than streets paved with gold.

"London streets are paved with gold" is a saying that came from the 19th century story Dick Whittington and His Cat, loosely based on the 14th century Lord Mayor of London, Richard Whittington. The saying, which expresses the idea of a "land of opportunity", is partly ironic, since Dick Whittington found when he went to London that the streets were in fact grimy and poverty stricken. The second irony was that with persistence, belief, and luck, Whittington was able to become successful.

The phrase appears in The Universal Songster (1826) — "The tykes no more can now be told / That London streets are paved with gold; / For, wishing their tales e'en to trepan, / He knocks gold from the stones does the highwayman."

The Leisure Hour (1866) wrote that "The rural poor grow up (we are told) with the notion that London is a mine of wealth — that its streets are "paved with gold;" and their heads are full of traditions of pennyless youngsters getting on in London until they become men of fortune."

The origin of the phrase may be Revelation 21:21, where the New Jerusalem is described: "The twelve gates were twelve pearls, and each gate was made of a single pearl. The street of the city was made of pure gold, as clear as glass." (International Standard Version)

The term also appears in John Bunyan's Pilgrims Progress (1678). His Celestial City is described as: "builded of pearls and precious stones, also the streets thereof were paved with gold."

== See also ==
- Roald Dahl, 'Dick Whittington and his Cat' in Rhyme Stew (1989)
