= The Roald Dahl Omnibus =

- First edition
- Author: Roald Dahl
- Publisher: Dorset Press
- Publication date: 1986
- Publication place: United Kingdom
- Media type: hardback

The Roald Dahl Omnibus is a 1986 short story collection by Roald Dahl.

The collection contains 28 stories selected from Switch Bitch, Kiss, Kiss, and Someone Like You – a collection of Dahl stories published in various magazines and collections from the 1940s onward. The five stories not reprinted from the source books are "My Lady Love, My Dove" and "The Sound Machine" from Someone Like You, "Parson's Pleasure" and "Mrs. Bixby and the Colonel's Coat" from Kiss Kiss, and "The Visitor" from Switch Bitch.
