= The Befrienders =

1972 British TV drama series

- Genre: Drama
- Created by: Harry W. Junkin
- Written by: Harry W. Junkin; Donald James; Stephen Rich; Stanley Connor; Chad Varah
- Directed by: Raymond Menmuir; Simon Langton; Vere Lorrimer; Ben Rea; Ken Hannam
- Starring: Megs Jenkins; Michael Culver; Peter Armitage
- Country of origin: United Kingdom
- Original language: English
- No. of series: 1
- No. of episodes: 11

Production
- Producer: John Henderson
- Running time: 50 minutes

Original release
- Network: BBC1

The Befrienders is an 11-episode British television drama series which aired on BBC1 in 1972. The series was based on the work of the Samaritans, the suicide prevention charity founded in 1953 by the Reverend Chad Varah. Each episode depicted a fictional, dramatised story of an individual in a predicament leading them to contemplate ending their life. Only one of the 11 episodes ended with a death by suicide.

At the time that the television series was broadcast, the Samaritans had 122 branches in the United Kingdom, as well as ten overseas. Most branches offered a 24-hour telephone service staffed by trained volunteers who would listen, often providing callers with relief in being able to have a confidential conversation with an anonymous voice. Some callers were encouraged to come to their local centre; in extreme cases, emergency services would be dispatched to assist the caller in person.

The series was created by Harry W. Junkin, who also wrote many of the episodes, with Varah as an advisor. The leading cast members playing Samaritans helpers included Megs Jenkins as the main character Janet, as well as Michael Culver and Peter Armitage. The producer was John Henderson.

== Pilot ==
On 30 November 1970, BBC1 screened a pilot of The Befrienders as part of its Drama Playhouse series. The play was titled "Drink a Toast to Dear Old Dad" and was written by Harry W. Junkin.

The story focused on a 17-year-old boy struggling with his wealthy, self-indulgent parents who held wild, drug-fueled parties nightly, which were preventing him from studying for his A-level exams. He goes to the Samaritans for help after seeing a poster in the post office.

Anticipating a large influx of calls following the broadcast, the real-life Samaritans obtained an extra telephone number to add up to 50 more lines from callers seeking assistance. Despite complaints that the plot of the pilot was "far-fetched", the BBC decided to move forward with the series. A spokesperson for the BBC later said that The Befrienders was part of a move toward more programming for social help, as well as "a logical development" following its police dramas Softly Softly and Z-Cars.

== Series ==
The first episode of The Befrienders was broadcast on 19 February 1972. The programme was 50 minutes long. The series aired on Saturday evenings at peak viewing times. The Samaritan volunteers were played by Megs Jenkins, Peter Armitage, and Michael Culver, as a housewife, a garage mechanic, and a lecturer, respectively. Each week, the main cast members were joined by a well known guest star playing a client of the Samaritans. Jane Wellow and Jenny Till were in recurring roles as Samaritan volunteers in training.

Publicity for the new series emphasised that while Harry Junkin was the main writer, Samaritans founder Chad Varah had personally reviewed each script for accuracy. Varah himself wrote the script for the sixth episode called "Nobody Understands Miranda", which aired on 25 March 1972.

=== Storylines ===
Titled "Allenby and Son, Ltd.", the first episode featured actor Glyn Houston playing a successful estate agent who is grieving and seeks help from the Samaritans after his son's death from a road accident.

The second episode, "Mr Marland's Revolt", guest starred William Lucas as a 50-year-old man who has become disenchanted with his "mundane" job and yearns for a second chance in life. Finding he has little in common with his wife now that their children have grown up, he decides to leave her, and reaches out to the Samaritans.

In the third episode, "Hunted", Meg Jenkins' character, Janet, clashes with a police detective inspector played by Gordon Jackson when her boyfriend Patrick (David Allister) commits a crime. She argues that Patrick, a "clean-living" young man whose self-righteousness has caused problems, deserves compassion.

The fourth episode, "Dense Forest, Hungry Wolves", featured Percy Herbert as a 50-year-old civil engineer whose firm goes bankrupt due to the recession in the construction industry. He loses his job, joining the one million workers in Britain at the time who were unemployed, and is shocked to find that he is unemployable.

The fifth episode, "A Case of No Resolution", featured guest star Anthony Bate as a married man who feels he is in a no-win situation whether he stays with or leaves his wife.

The sixth episode, "Nobody Understands Miranda", dealt with endogenous depression. Jean Marsh portrayed Miranda, an outwardly successful fashion designer who comes across as rude and self-centred and, despite initially "hav[ing] everything", suddenly breaks up with her fiancé, gets herself fired, and alienates her best friend.

The seventh episode, "Lots of Friends in the Big City", depicted the tragic story of an overly diligent student played by John Arthur Baron.

In the eighth episode, "Next Patient, Please", Michael Gwynn played a physician who needs help. He faces the possible loss of his general medical practice in London, as well as his wife (played by Jane Hylton), and turns to the Samaritans.

The ninth episode, "Wedding March", featured Liza Goddard as a pregnant 18-year-old who contacts the Samaritans when she realises that her parents are more concerned with what people think of them rather than her best interests.

In the tenth episode, "Odds Against", Mary Miller played the wife of a compulsive gambler in debt played by Frederick Jaeger.

The final episode on 29 April 1972, called "Fallen Star", featured Patrick Troughton as Jim Goody, a former professional football player who clings to his past glories but is bankrupt and bitter, and reaches out to the Samaritans after his wife leaves him. The episode has a happy ending when the ex-footballer, at first too proud to accept what he perceived as "charity" from a director of his old football club, comes to terms with working as a chauffeur as a solution to his financial problems.

== Critical reception ==
=== Pilot ===
The 1970 pilot "Drink a Toast to Dear Old Dad" received a "wildly mixed reception" immediately after it aired. Critics did not like the plot, which at one point had the angry father planting marijuana in his teenage son's bedroom and reporting him to the police for revenge, complaining that it seemed unrealistic and implausible.

Terry Dwyer wrote in the Leicester Mercury that the episode "came very close to being a parody of the more usual situation of parental anxiety over a layabout son". In a review for The Observer, George Melly wrote, "Seldom have I seen on television a more incredible hotch-potch of morally dubious attitudes, fake drama and the worst kind of tear-jerking schmalz. At the same time, I must own up to frequently bursting into astonished laughter." Jean Blackmore had a similar reaction, saying in the Western Daily Press, "I roared with laughter all the way through. My apologies to the playwright, and to the Samaritans if I was not meant to." Stanley Reynolds suggested that the humour was deliberate, writing in The Times that it "was not a comedy but it had definite and very funny comic overtones...One knows that often when a joke is interpreted the meaning behind it is tragic, and this was the case here."

The Birmingham Post's Pamela Hedges found "some flashes of reality" and suggested that if The Befrienders were to become a full series, there were "vast possibilities for 'human stories' which could have wide television appeal". A bright spot was actress Faith Brook, who was praised by Blackmore for her "magnificent" turn as the boy's mother, which Melly called "a pathetic creature...and by far the best conceived character in the play".

=== Series ===
Following the first episode in 1972, Ivor Jay wrote in the Birmingham Evening Mail that the show had him in tears, and predicted that the series would "woo only wallowing masochists", asking "for goodness sake, who has this hunger for even more melancholy jitters?" Meanwhile, Terry Metcalf of The Birmingham Post complained that the story was "stumbling and sentimental" with not enough content for the programme's full 50-minute run, resulting in an episode with too much exposition and detail about the Samaritans' mission and approach.

After the sixth episode had aired, Rita Wharton wrote in the Leicester Mercury that "Despite the series' good intentions and sensitive handling of typical case histories, one wonders who gains what out of having tales of human misery and despair recounted week after week". She suggested that the work of the Samaritans might be better served through a documentary rather than a dramatisation.

A review in the Coventry Evening Telegraph about the final episode said, "This was a down-to-earth sort of script which highlighted an everyday problem and at the same time drove home that the Samaritans are not a bunch of fussy do-gooders, but ordinary people who are prepared to give up their own time to listen to other people's problems without dishing out mushy sentiment."

=== Cancellation ===
The Befrienders was not renewed for a second season. While the series had helped to build awareness for the Samaritans' work among the general public, it received some scepticism from some of the charity's volunteers as "over-romanticised". Although Varah himself believed that this was the main reason for the series' cancellation, a 2003 book on the Samaritans suggests that the BBC's decision was based on a survey of audience sentiment. Reactions to the programme were mixed, with complaints that the pacing was too slow.

== Impact ==
In an article published on 18 March 1972, lead actress Megs Jenkins told the Hull Daily Mail that following the initial broadcast of The Befrienders, the Samaritans had gained 250 new volunteers in London alone. Typically, however, not every new recruit would be deemed suitable after going through training.

The show generated a large number of calls to the Samaritans, as well as to a man in Manchester whose phone number was similar to the main number based in London. By August 1972, the Samaritans were reporting that the number of clients they were assisting at branches nationwide had nearly doubled since before the show began. In 1974, The Times reported that a rise in the number of children and adolescents calling the Samaritans was attributable to The Befrienders.

A 1975 study published in The British Medical Journal found that although The Befrienders did not have preventative effects, it did result in an influx of calls to the Edinburgh branch of the Samaritans.

In 2022, the Express & Echo reported that the television series had inspired a volunteer at the organisation's Exeter, Mid & East Devon branch, who went on to work with the Samaritans for fifty years.

== Episode list ==
Like many BBC programmes of the era, the tapes of The Befrienders were wiped and are no longer available.

No.	Title	Written by	Directed by	Air date	Ref.
1	"Allenby and Son, Ltd"	Harry W. Junkin	Raymond Menmuir	19 February 1972	
2	"Mr Marland's Revolt"	Harry W. Junkin	Raymond Menmuir	26 February 1972	
3	"Hunted"	Harry W. Junkin	Simon Langton	4 March 1972	
4	"Dense Forest, Hungry Wolves"	Donald James	Vere Lorrimer	11 March 1972	
5	"A Case of No Resolution"	Harry W. Junkin	Ben Rea	18 March 1972	
6	"Nobody Understands Miranda"	Chad Varah	Raymond Menmuir	25 March 1972	
7	"Lots of Friends in the Big City"	Stephen Rich	Ken Hannam	1 April 1972	
8	"Next Patient, Please"	Donald James	Simon Langton	8 April 1972	
9	"Wedding March"	Stanley Connor	Raymond Menmuir	15 April 1972	
10	"Odds Against"	Harry W. Junkin	Vere Lorrimer	22 April 1972	
11	"Fallen Star"	Stephen Rich	Ben Rea	29 April 1972	
