= Harry W. Junkin =

Canadian writer for radio and TV (1916–1978)

Harry W. Junkin (5 January 1916 - 1 April 1978) was a Canadian writer for radio and television programs who sometimes hosted and directed radio shows. He wrote more than 1,000 scripts for radio shows and more than 2,000 scripts for British and American TV combined.

== Early years ==
Junkin was born in Winnipeg, Canada. As a high school student he played piano for a local radio station. That job ended when he and a friend went on strike to have their salaries raised from $7 per week to $10 per week. Desiring to become a writer, he worked as helper in a restaurant's kitchen to save money to travel to Europe. When his savings reached $700, his father matched that amount. He went to London, where he wrote a script for a film before he returned home.

He served in the Royal Canadian Air Force (RCAF)

== Career ==
After Junkin left the RCAF he became an advertising copy writer in Toronto, Canada. His work included writing radio commercials for the Cockfield Brown ad agency.

=== Radio ===
Junkin began writing for radio soon after World War II ended. His first involvement with radio drama occurred when he wrote scripts for The Children's Scrapbook on the Canadian Broadcasting Corporation (CBC). His work on another CBC presentation, the drama "Long Distance", led to his being hired by NBC and moving to the United States. His first position with NBC was staff director in the network's headquarters in New York in 1948.

He wrote for Radio City Playhouse and sometimes was the show's director and host. Other radio programs for which he wrote included Mr. Keen, Tracer of Lost Persons, Big Town, The Chase, Mr. District Attorney, Mr. I. A. Moto, Popular Playhouse, Sunday Serenade, and Top Secret. Other programs that he directed included The Adventures of Frank Merriwell, Conflict, and The Catholic Hour.

Junkin returned to Winnipeg in 1978 to write scripts for three radio plays broadcast on the CBC's Playhouse.

=== Television ===
Junkin's writing for TV programs began in 1949. Programs for which he created scripts included The Telltale Clue, Front Row Center, Star Tonight, The Philco Television Playhouse, Studio One Summer Theatre, Cameo Theatre, Modern Romances, Lux Video Theatre, The Saint, and Wagon Train. Junkin adapted 38 of Leslie Charteris's stories about The Saint for the TV series that starred Roger Moore and oversaw the writing of the other 71. His work for British TV included Notorious Woman. Bob Baker, co-owner of the company that produced The Saint, said, "We were very fortunate in having Harry Junkin as story editor, who was brilliant at his job."

In 1956, Junkin was one of nine writers signed to one-year contracts with CBS that called for a salary of $12,000 - $15,000 for a year for each writer in return for providing five TV scripts of one hour or 90 minutes each. The New York Times reported, "The idea itself is not new; but it is probably the first time that a network has embarked on a project of this type." Payments were made weekly to create a feeling of security.

Junkin created The Befrienders, an 11-part series broadcast on BBC One in 1972. He also was the series's script editor and co-producer. Episodes dealt with efforts of the Samaritans organization to prevent suicides.

=== "Long Distance" ===
One of Junkin's scripts, "Long Distance" has been called "a broadcasting classic". It originated from his experience when he was in the RCAF. An unexpected leave prompted Junkin to call his wife to let her know he was headed home. All of the telephone circuits were busy, however, and he could not complete the call. He said, "I started thinking about the busy circuits and wondering what a person would do if the message were a matter of life and death. And then I sat down and wrote 'Long Distance.'" The CBC first broadcast "Long Distance" in 1941; repeats followed on that network in 1943, 1945, and 1947. The Australian Broadcasting Corporation aired it in 1946, and in 1947 it was broadcast by the British Broadcasting Corporation. After Junkin began working for NBC, that network broadcast the episode twice (separated by three months) in 1948. The first TV broadcast of the story was on The Clock in 1950. It was done on Lux Video Theatre in 1953 and in 1954 and on Schlitz Playhouse of Stars in 1958. By then it had also been broadcast in France, Germany, and Switzerland. New versions of the story were broadcast at least as late as 1964, when the NBC radio network presented it as an episode of Drama—The Experiment—Part II.

=== "A Public Figure" ===
Junkin's "A Public Figure" story was presented on CBS-TV's Studio One on January 23, 1956, with Mercedes McCambridge and James Daly starring. The episode focused on a scandal magazine's exposure of something an actor did when he was a boy and the actor's efforts to fight back. Daly's character (a children's-show hero) lost his job after the revelation that he had been imprisoned for an armed robbery that he committed when he was 17 years old. The episode had another victim of an expose (a Nobel Prize-winning poet) take his own life. Hedda Hopper reported, "CBS was jammed with phone calls congratulating them on their terrific attack on scandal magazines and the havoc they make in the lives of people."

==== Critical response ====
An advance review of the episode distributed in newspapers by TV Key Previews said that the episode "has moments of real impact" with "good performances all around".

Bernie Harrison, writing in The (Washington, D. C.) Evening Star, called the episode "an imaginative topical drama that fairly crackled for three exciting acts." Harrison acknowledged that the episode "was patently oversimplified" and contained "melodramatic cliches" but said that it summed up the situation conclusively and persuasively.

Win Fanning expressed his disappointment about the episode in a review in the Pittsburgh Post-Gazette, citing several highlights that were offset by flaws. The segment about the poet's suicide, Fanning wrote, was "the best directed and photographed scene in a spectacularly bad technical production". Fannin felt that Junkin should have had a victim of smear articles respond with a lawsuit and dramatized the potential legal consequences when a publication committed libel. He described some parts of Junkin's script as "darn good lines" but added that other parts were "pure soap opera, and not very good soap at that".

==== Film rights ====
Before the broadcast, producer Armand Deutsch purchased film rights for the play, and on February 19, 1956, he reached an agreement with Metro-Goldwyn-Mayer to make a film from the story. An announcement related to acquisition of the film rights by MGM head Dore Schary said, "While Hollywood has been fighting vicious misrepresentations of facts concerning celebrities in the entertainment world for many months, 'A Public Figure' is the first story to turn the spotlight on the anonymous publishers."
