= 36 Hours (1964 film) =

1964 film by George Seaton

- Theatrical release poster
- Directed by: George Seaton
- Screenplay by: George Seaton
- Story by: Carl K. Hittleman; Luis Vance
- Based on: "Beware of the Dog"; 1944 story in Harper's by Roald Dahl
- Produced by: William Perlberg
- Starring: James Garner; Eva Marie Saint; Rod Taylor; Werner Peters
- Cinematography: Philip H. Lathrop
- Edited by: Adrienne Fazan; Alex Beaton
- Music by: Dimitri Tiomkin
- Production companies: Perlberg-Seaton Productions; Cherokee Productions
- Distributed by: Metro-Goldwyn-Mayer
- Release dates: November 26, 1964 (London); December 15, 1964 (Pittsburgh); February 19, 1965 (United States)
- Running time: 115 minutes
- Country: United States
- Language: English
- Box office: $2.2 million

36 Hours is a 1964 American thriller film written and directed by George Seaton from a story by Carl K. Hittleman and Luis Vance, based on the 1944 short story "Beware of the Dog" by Roald Dahl. The film stars James Garner, Eva Marie Saint, Rod Taylor and Werner Peters.

== Plot ==
After attending General Eisenhower's final briefing on the upcoming Normandy landings, U.S. Army major Jeff Pike is sent to Lisbon, Portugal on June 1, 1944 to meet an informant to confirm that the Nazis still expect the invasion at the Pas de Calais. He is abducted and transported to Germany.

Pike awakens in what seems to be a U.S. Army hospital. He is told it is May 1950 and that he is in post-war occupied Germany. Psychiatrist Walter Gerber explains Pike has been experiencing amnesia since he was tortured in Lisbon and advises Pike his blocked memories have always resurfaced during therapy by remembering events prior to Lisbon. He is assisted by a German nurse, the dispassionate Anna Hedler. Pike, fooled by the deception, recounts the details of the invasion plans, including the location and the date, June 5, as part of his "therapy".

Pike realizes he's been deceived when he notices a nearly invisible paper cut he received the day he left for Lisbon. He confirms his suspicion by tricking a soldier to reflexively snap to attention. He confronts Anna, who admits that the date is June 2, 1944. She was recruited from a concentration camp because she is a nurse who speaks English.

Pike instructs Anna to tell Gerber that he knows about the plot while he makes a feeble attempt to escape. Quickly recaptured, he claims that he realized what was happening soon after waking, but Gerber does not believe him. After two days of interrogation, Pike and Anna convince SS agent Schack, who never believed that the deception would work. Schack is sure that the invasion will occur at the Pas de Calais, but Gerber sets the clock forward so that Pike and Anna believe that it is the morning of June 5 and then states that the Germans have been surprised at Normandy. Pike is again fooled and confirms the Normandy plan. Gerber sends an emergency dispatch, but the weather on June 5 forces a delay in the landing time. By midday, Schack orders the discredited Gerber arrested.

Gerber knows that Schack will kill them to cover his own blunder and helps Anna and Pike escape. He asks Pike to take his groundbreaking research on amnesia with him. When the invasion begins the next morning, Gerber reveals he has taken poison and taunts Schack that he will likely be killed. Schack impatiently pursues the escapees on his own.

The couple flee to a local minister, whom Pike knows had helped downed RAF pilots escape to nearby Switzerland. The minister is away, but his housekeeper Elsa introduces them to a corrupt German border guard, Ernst Furzen. Pike and Anna bribe him with his watch and her rings to secure passage across the border. Furzen gives Elsa one of the rings. Schack arrives at the minister's house after Furzen and the couple have left for the border, but he recognizes Anna's ring on Elsa's finger and forces her to reveal where they have gone. Schack reaches them at the border, but Furzen shoots him and arranges Schack's body to create the appearance that he had been killed while trying to escape.

Safely in Switzerland, Pike and Anna are placed in separate cars. Anna cries as they part, her first display of emotion in years.

== Cast ==
- James Garner as Major Jefferson Pike
- Eva Marie Saint as Anna Hedler
- Rod Taylor as Major Walter Gerber
- Werner Peters as Otto Schack
- John Banner as Ernst Furzen
- Alan Napier as Colonel Peter MacLean
- Ed Gilbert as Captain Abbott
- Celia Lovsky as Elsa
- Russell Thorson as General Allison
- Oscar Beregi as Lt. Colonel Karl Ostermann
- Sig Ruman as German Guard
- Karl Held as Corporal Kenter

== Production ==
The movie was scheduled in 1962.

Most of the film was shot in Yosemite National Park. Exterior shots were filmed at the Wawona Hotel near the entrance of Yosemite National Park.

== Reception ==
=== Critical ===
36 Hours received largely positive reviews upon its initial release.

On the review aggregator website Rotten Tomatoes, 83% of 6 critics' reviews are positive, with an average rating of 7.2/10.

==== Domestic reviews ====
The New Yorker called the film an "ingenious thriller" and praised Garner, Saint, and Taylor for being "plausible in highly implausible roles". Kate Cameron of the New York Daily News gave the film a full four-star rating and said that "the plot is cleverly and believably worked out on the screen, and the excitement of the intelligence operation is augmented by the limited time the Germans have at their disposal to brainwash their prisoner into believing he has had a form of amnesia that has blotted out six years of his life."

However in the opinion of The New York Times critic Bosley Crowther, "What is annoying about this picture is that the set-up for pulling off the plot is just too slick and artificial, too patly and elaborately contrived. ... Even though Mr. Seaton has done a thorough and careful job of staging this massive deception and has got his able cast to play it with reasonable assurance, it has such a synthetic look and, indeed, the idea is so theatrical that the whole thing rings curiously false."

==== International reviews ====
Dick Richards of the Daily Mirror said that "the film '36 Hours' (Empire, A) is a tense game of cat-and-mouse that may have some flaws for those who were mixed up with wartime Army Intelligence. But most people will find it a sound, absorbing couple of hours as they watch a fascinating battle of wits." Richard Roud of The Guardian called it a "first-class commercial film. Commercial is not used pejoratively; it simply defines the scope of the film. And within that scope, it comes close to perfection. For one thing, its story is exciting, compelling, and ingenious. For another, the direction does not get in the way of the story technique is invisible, but effective." Patrick Gibbs of The Daily Telegraph gave the film a negative review, believing the storyline to be far more suited to print than to film and rendered unrealistic by Seaton's direction.

==== Comments from James Garner ====
Garner wrote in his memoirs that he felt "the movie doesn't work because there's no suspense; everybody knew that in real life the D-Day invasion was a success and that we'd won the war", but he did enjoy working with Saint and George Seaton.

== Background ==
Banner's role, which provided the comedy relief in 36 Hours, was the role model for his easy-going German soldier POW camp guard Sgt. Hans Schultz in the television series Hogan's Heroes (1965–71). Coincidentally, Sig Ruman played a similar POW camp guard named Sgt. Schultz in the William Holden feature film Stalag 17 (1953).

== Remake ==
The film was remade as a 1989 television film, Breaking Point, starring Corbin Bernsen.

== See also ==
- List of American films of 1965
