= Mark Lamos =

American actor and director

- Born: March 10, 1946 (age 80); Melrose Park, Illinois, U.S.
- Occupations: Director, producer, actor
- Partner: Jerry Jones

Mark Lamos (born March 10, 1946) is an American theatre and opera director, producer and actor. Under his direction, Hartford Stage won the 1989 Tony Award for Outstanding Regional Theatre and he has been nominated for two other Tonys. For more than 15 seasons, he has been artistic director of the Westport Country Playhouse. In May 2023, he announced he will leave the post in January 2024.

== Life and career ==
Born in Melrose Park, Illinois, Lamos studied violin and ballet at an early age, and participated in high school theater productions at Proviso East High School, Maywood, IL, from which he graduated in 1964. He attended Northwestern University on a music scholarship.

He began his theatrical career as an actor at the Guthrie Theater in Minneapolis. His early Broadway appearances all were in short-lived productions: The Love Suicide at Schofield Barracks and The Creation of the World and Other Business in 1972, Cyrano in 1973, and a revival of Man and Superman in 1978. He also appeared in the 1990 film Longtime Companion.

He served as artistic director of Hartford Stage from 1981 to 1998. Hartford Stage gained national recognition under Lamos, who shook up the theatre's traditional repertoire with bolder contemporary dramas and spectacular productions of Shakespeare and classics such as Peer Gynt and The Greeks, a cycle of ancient Greek dramas. Productions that ended up on Broadway included Marvin's Room, Our Country's Good, Tiny Alice, Tea at Five, The Carpetbagger's Children and Enchanted April.

He was appointed the artistic director of the Westport Country Playhouse, effective in February 2009.

Directing credits Westport Country Playhouse: Harbor; Into the Woods; Twelfth Night; Lips Together, Teeth Apart; Happy Days; She Loves Me; The Breath of Life; That Championship Season; Of Mice and Men. New York credits: The Rivals, Big Bill, Seascape, Cymbeline, Measure for Measure (Lortel Award), all for Lincoln Center Theater; The Gershwins’ Fascinating Rhythm; The Deep Blue Sea; Our Country's Good (Tony Award nomination). Off-Broadway: The End of the Day (Playwrights Horizons); Thief River (Signature Theatre Company); Love's Fire (Public Theater, Acting Company); As You Like It (Public Theater, Central Park); Indian Blood, Buffalo Gal, Black Tie and Harbor (Primary Stages). Artistic Director, Hartford Stage (1989 Tony Award for theater's body of work). Other theater: The Kennedy Center; Washington's Ford's Theatre; Canada's Stratford Festival; Guthrie Theater; A.C.T.; Chicago Shakespeare Theater; Yale Repertory Theatre; D.C.'s Shakespeare Theatre; Cincinnati Playhouse in the Park; San Diego's Old Globe; Moscow's Pushkin Theatre (first American to direct in former Soviet Union). Opera: I Lombardi, Wozzeck, (both televised for Great Performances); The Great Gatsby (world premiere) and Adriana Lecouvreur at the Metropolitan Opera; many productions for New York City Opera, including televised productions of Paul Bunyan, Tosca, Central Park and Madama Butterfly (Emmy Award). Glimmerglass Opera; Gothenburg's Stora Teatern; L'Opéra de Montréal; Chicago Lyric; San Francisco Opera; Norway's Bergen National Opera; and opera companies of Santa Fe, St. Louis, Washington, Dallas, Seattle.

Lamos began his career in the theater as an actor on and off-Broadway and in regional theater. He made his film debut in Longtime Companion. He was awarded the Connecticut Medal for the Arts as well as honorary doctorates from Connecticut College, University of Hartford, and Trinity College (Connecticut).

Lamos was awarded the 2007 Beinecke Fellow, Yale University, the Stanford Chair at University of Miami in Coral Cables, has lectured at Yale and was a visiting adjunct professor in the Department of Theater at the University of Michigan.

Lamos is openly gay. His partner since 1979 is Jerry Jones.

== Awards and nominations ==
- 1991 Tony Award for Best Direction of a Play - Our Country's Good, nominee
- 1991 Tony Award for Best Play - Our Country's Good, nominee
- 1989 Tony Award for Outstanding Regional Theatre - The Hartford Stage Company, winner
- 1989 Connecticut Medal for the Arts
