= The Visitor (short story) =

Short story by Roald Dahl

- Short story by Roald Dahl
- Language: English
- Genre: Fiction

Publication
- Published in: Playboy
- Publication type: Magazine
- Publication date: May 1965
- Series: Uncle Oswald

"The Visitor" is a 1965 short story by British writer Roald Dahl, centred on the fictional Uncle Oswald and the lurid adventures he describes in his elaborate diaries. In this story, set in 1946, Oswald has amorous designs on his Syrian host's wife and teenage daughter, with unfortunate and unexpected consequences.

== Plot ==
Oswald becomes stranded for a night near Cairo at the desert mansion of a wealthy businessman, Abdul Aziz, whose wife and adult daughter are both very beautiful. Oswald plots to seduce either the wife or daughter, and believes he has succeeded after a woman slips into his bedroom under cover of darkness and spends several passionate hours with him, although he cannot see her face and she refuses to converse with him. The next day, Oswald leaves the house none the wiser as to which of the two women he has slept with. The story ends with a twist as Mr Aziz reveals to Oswald that he has a second daughter who lives in seclusion in another part of the house – because she has incurable leprosy.

== Publication history ==
"The Visitor" was first published in the May 1965 issue of Playboy. It was later included in the 1974 collection Switch Bitch.

Norton H Moses states that Dahl's story was likely expanded from an anecdote found in George "Dod" Orsborne's Master of the Girl Pat, published in 1949. Orsborne presented the anecdote as factual, involving a writer known to an editor who then told the story to Orsborne.

Additionally, this story was told at least once by Ian Fleming, from whom Dahl got the plot of "Lamb To The Slaughter". Dahl did not publish it until after Fleming's death.

However, David Ogilvy recalled that Dahl had told the basic story orally as early as 1941, during their association together through British intelligence activities during World War II, with Dahl half-seriously presenting the tale as a true incident that had happened to "a friend".

== In other media ==
=== Television ===
In his later years, Alfred Hitchcock occasionally told this story as a black joke during his appearances on American talk shows, most notably during an appearance on The Tomorrow Show on 29 May 1973.

Akhbar's Daughter, a 1987 television pilot associated with Tales from the Darkside, bears many similarities to the Dahl and Orsborne stories.

Norm Macdonald tells a version of this story as a joke on his podcast Norm Macdonald Live, on season 2, episode 6.

== See also ==
- "Bitch"
- "My Uncle Oswald"
- "Switch Bitch"
