= Grubstake =

1952 film

- Directed by: Larry Buchanan
- Written by: Larry Buchanan
- Screenplay by: Larry Buchanan, Lynn Shubert
- Produced by: Larry Buchanan
- Production company: Tejano Productions
- Release date: 1952
- Country: United States
- Language: English

Grubstake, also known as Apache Gold, is a 1952 American Western film directed by Larry Buchanan.

== Cast ==
- Stephen Wyman
- Jack Klugman
- Neile Adams
- Lynn Shubert
- Kort Falkenberg

== Production ==
According to Larry Buchanan, Stanley Kubrick offered his services as cinematographer but he wanted to be paid $1,000 a week and Buchanan was only offering $350.

Jack Klugman appears in an early role.
