= Breaking Point (1989 film) =

- Home video release poster
- Genre: Thriller
- Based on: "Beware of the Dog" by Roald Dahl; 36 Hours by; Carl K. Hittleman; Luis H. Vance
- Teleplay by: Stanley Greenberg
- Directed by: Peter Markle
- Starring: Corbin Bernsen; Joanna Pacuła; John Glover; David Marshall Grant
- Music by: J. A. C. Redford
- Country of origin: United States
- Original language: English

Production
- Producers: Jon Avnet; Jordan Kerner
- Cinematography: Don Burgess
- Editor: Debra Neil
- Running time: 100 minutes
- Production company: The Avnet/Kerner Company

Original release
- Network: TNT
- Release: August 18, 1989

Breaking Point is a 1989 American war thriller television film directed by Peter Markle and written by Stanley Greenberg. It is a remake of the 1964 film 36 Hours, which in turn was based on the 1944 short story "Beware of the Dog" by Roald Dahl. The film stars Corbin Bernsen, Joanna Pacuła, John Glover, and David Marshall Grant. It aired on TNT on August 18, 1989.

== Cast ==
- Corbin Bernsen as Pike
- Joanna Pacuła as Anna / Diana
- John Glover as Dr. Gerber
- David Marshall Grant as Osterman
- Lawrence Pressman as Gen. Smith
- Ken Jenkins as Col. Lowe
- Dennis Creaghan as Ungerland
- Joris Stuyck as Braga
- Andrew Divoff as Aide
- Kathryn Miller as Catherine
- Douglas Roberts as Dr. Johns
- John Alden as Abbot
- Alan Toy as Leroy
