= Ah, Sweet Mystery of Life: The Country Stories of Roald Dahl =

Short story collection by Roald Dahl

- First edition cover by John Lawrence
- Author: Roald Dahl
- Illustrator: John Lawrence
- Language: English
- Publisher: Michael Joseph
- Publication date: 1989
- Publication place: United Kingdom
- Media type: hardback

Ah, Sweet Mystery of Life: The Country Stories of Roald Dahl is a 1989 short story collection by Roald Dahl. The book is a collection of seven of Dahl's stories published in various magazines and collections in the 1950s and 1970s. Containing much black humour, the book contains sickening and grotesque stories about ratcatching, maggot breeding, poaching, and the mysteries and eccentricities of rural life.

== Contents ==
Ah, Sweet Mystery of Life

The story was commissioned by The New York Times and ran on September 14, 1974. The title is derived from Rida Johnson Young's lyrics for Naughty Marietta.

The story purports to be autobiographical, telling how Dahl mated his heifer with a local bull. Its owner, Mr. Rummins, guarantees Dahl a heifer by facing his cow into the sun during mating. He shows the author 32 years of records that prove the reliability of the method, which Rummins learned from his father. In the theory, female spermatozoa are heliotropic and will outrace their male counterparts if the sun is behind their target. Rummins points to his four sons as proof that the method also works with humans.

Parson’s Pleasure

First published in Esquire April 1958. Cyril Boggis is an antique dealer who has been posing as a parson to gain access to people's homes. He claims to belong to a society for preserving rare furniture and then buys antiques from unsuspecting owners for a pittance. On one of his scouting trips, he comes across Rummins and his son Bert at their farm. They are being visited by their neighbor Claud, and all three are suspicious of the approaching parson.

Inside Rummins' house, Boggis spots a Chippendale commode. He is so stunned that he feigns a heart ailment to buy time. He convinces the men that the commode is a cheap replica and offers them £10 for the legs, pretending that they are the only part that interests him. He huffs that he would probably use the rest for firewood.

Rummins haggles, and Boggis doubles his offer. As he walks to his car, he is giddy over purchasing a £15–20,000 commode for only £20. Meanwhile, the men figure that they would be doing the parson a favor by cutting off the legs for him. When they are done, they decide to chop it into firewood to further convenience its buyer.

The Ratcatcher

This story and the following three were grouped together under the title "Claude's Dog" in Dahl's 1953 story collection Someone Like You.

A ratcatcher comes to Claud's petrol station to combat an infestation. He scatters some poisoned oats around a hayrick across the road. When he arrives to collect the dead rats a few days later, he is peeved to find none.

To regain the waning respect of his clients, the ratcatcher puts a ferret and a rat in his shirt and stands motionless while the ferret kills the rat. He then bets the men he can kill a rat without using his hands or feet. To win the wager, he kills it with his teeth. As he spits out the blood, he claims rat blood is the secret ingredient in liquorice.

Rummins

Claud Cubbage is walking his greyhound when he comes across Rummins. He tells Rummins a ratcatcher has been to the hayrick across from Claud's petrol station. Rummins huffs that all hayricks have rats, but Claud insists the infestation in this one is unusual.

Rummins and his son Bert decide to dismantle the hayrick. Claud and the narrator watch as the rats start to flee the structure. As Bert cuts bales out of the hayrick, his knife hits an obstruction. He uneasily grinds through it upon his father's urging.

The narrator recalls when Rummins built the hayrick in June. He and Claud and other men, like the town drunk Ole Jimmy, had helped Rummins and Bert with the effort. They were in a hurry to finish before a storm approached. During a break, Claud and the narrator crossed the road to the station to make sandwiches. Jimmy disappeared for a nap, having drunk some beer. When Claud and the narrator returned, Jimmy was gone. Rummins assumed he had gone home and continues frantically piling hay as the storm grew nearer.

Finally, Bert cuts through the obstruction and throws down a bale to his father. He is horrified by what he sees. Rummins knows right away what Bert has bisected and runs away as his son starts to scream.

Mr. Feasey

First published as "Dog Race" in The New Yorker on July 25, 1953. Claud and Gordon swap a ringer for the greyhound they have been racing at Mr. Feasey's tracks. The original dog, Black Panther, is a terrible runner, barely able to beat out dogs who come up lame. Having established his incompetence, Claud brings Jackie, a nearly identical dog who is very fast, to Mr. Feasey's latest race.

Knowing how inept Black Panther is, Mr. Feasey refuses to let him run until Claud wagers a quid that the dog will not finish last. Gordon's job is to place small bets with all the bookies at the race. The odds on Black Panther are 25-1. Jackie easily wins the race, and Feasey realizes the dog is a ringer. When Gordon collects his winnings, none of the bookies pay out.

Mr. Hoddy

Claud Cubbage is visiting his fiancee Clarice's father, Mr. Hoddy. He knows Mr. Hoddy will look down on his scheme to win greyhound races with a ringer. So, he regales his host with tales of the maggot farm he is planning to open with his friend Gordon. Mr. Hoddy is disgusted by the notion.

The Champion of the World

First published in The New Yorker on January 31, 1959. At the filling station, Claud delights his friend Gordon with tales of his father's poaching exploits. One of his prized techniques uses raisins to ensnare pheasants. They can be used as bait in traps or filled with horsehair, which chokes the birds. Gordon suggests filling the raisins with seconal. Claud thrills at the suggestion. He wants to use the tactic to ruin pie and sausage manufacturer Victor Hazell's annual pheasant hunt.

Claud & Gordon spend the night preparing the raisins. In Hazell's woods, they toss the doped raisins at the pheasants within sight of a game keeper. As they wait for the barbiturate to take effect, another game keeper interrogates them, but they brush him off. When the keepers have gone home for the night, Claud and Gordon listen as the unconscious pheasants drop from the trees. They tally 120 birds, and Gordon dubs Claud the "champion of the world".

They load the pheasants into sacks and drag them to a waiting taxi. The offload their haul at the vicarage. To cover their tracks, the vicar's wife will deliver the pheasants to them. However, as she approaches with their loot the next day, the effects of the drug wear off. The pheasants awake and escape.

== Adaptations ==
- "The Champion of the World" was adapted by the author into the 1975 novel Danny, the Champion of the World.
- "The Ratcatcher" was filmed in 2024 by Wes Anderson with Ralph Fiennes in the title role.

== See also ==
- Someone Like You (1953)
- Kiss Kiss (1960)
- Danny, the Champion of the World (1975)
- My Uncle Oswald (1979)
- The Collected Short Stories of Roald Dahl (1991)
