= Hazel Medina =

Panamanian-born American actress and social worker

- Born: October 8, 1937; Colón, Panama
- Died: February 14, 2012 (aged 74); New York Presbyterian Hospital, New York, New York, U.S.
- Occupation: Actress
- Years active: 1967-2007
- Spouse: Jerry Matz (1981–2012; her death)

Hazel Medina (October 8, 1937 – February 14, 2012) was a Panamanian-born American actress and social worker. She made many guest appearances on television shows between 1969 and 2007, as well as appearing on stage as a member of Theater West and a founding member of the Group Repertory Theater.

== Career ==
She made her on-screen debut in the TV series I Spy in 1967, playing the younger sister of Bill Cosby's character. Then she followed up with a part in Gunsmoke. In 1970, she appeared in an episode of Medical Center, "The Rebel In White", playing the part of Hettie Simpson.

== Illness and death ==
In 2007, Medina was diagnosed with multiple myeloma. She died from complications of the disease on February 14, 2012. She was 74 years of age at New York Presbyterian Hospital in Manhattan.

== Filmography ==
Filmography
Title	Year	Role	Director	Notes #
Watermelon Man	1970	Widow	Melvin Van Peebles	
Women in Chains	1972	Althea	Bernard L. Kowalski	TV movie
Limbo	1972	Jane Work	Mark Robson	
Cry Rape	1973	Louise Jennings	Corey Allen	TV movie
Longtime Companion	1989	Triage Nurse	Norman René	
Malcolm X	1992	Cashier Person	Spike Lee	
The Point of Betrayal	1995	Nurse	Richard Martini	
Music of the Heart	1999	Alice	Wes Craven	
Ten Hundred Kings	2000	Rehab Attendant	D.W. Maze	
My Suicidal Sweetheart	2005	Night Nurse	Michael Parness	
Betty on the Bed	2006	Alice	Steve Harper	Short
I Think I Love My Wife	2007	Pam	Chris Rock	(final film role)
