= This Could Be the Night (film) =

1957 film by Robert Wise

- Theatrical poster
- Directed by: Robert Wise
- Screenplay by: Isobel Lennart
- Based on: Protection for a Tough Racket; 1954 story in Harper's by Cornelia Baird Gross
- Produced by: Joe Pasternak
- Starring: Jean Simmons; Paul Douglas; Tony Franciosa
- Cinematography: Russell Harlan
- Edited by: George Boemler
- Music by: Nicholas Brodszky; George Stoll
- Distributed by: Metro-Goldwyn-Mayer
- Release date: May 14, 1957
- Running time: 104 minutes
- Country: United States
- Language: English
- Budget: $1,560,000
- Box office: $1,520,000

This Could Be the Night is a 1957 American MGM comedy-drama film directed by Robert Wise and starring Jean Simmons and Paul Douglas. Anthony Franciosa made his debut in the film, which is based on the short stories by Cornelia Baird Gross.

== Plot ==
Anne Leeds is a school teacher with only four weeks of experience. She takes a part-time job as a secretary to an ex-bootlegger and horse-playing gambler by the name of Rocco. He's a Broadway nightclub owner with a heart of gold who falls in love with Anne. However, he knows he's too old for her, so keeps his feelings to himself.

Anne "thinks" she's in love with his younger partner Tony Armotti, a typical playboy type who is afraid to fall in love because it might mean marriage. Tony lives in a walkup apartment above the nightclub, where he often entertains beautiful women. The stairs to the apartment are on the alley behind the club.

The entire nightclub loves Anne but Tony resents her because he wants to take care of her and protect her. Eventually after confronting Tony, Anne quits because Tony tells her he does not love her and never will. After she quits, the entire nightclub disparages Tony over whether Anne quit or was fired. He goes to where she is currently working and, after helping her escape when police raid the gambling den, convinces her to take back the job she quit.

== Cast ==
- Jean Simmons as Anne Leeds
- Paul Douglas as Rocco
- Anthony Franciosa as Tony Armotti
- Julie Wilson as Ivy Corlane
- Neile Adams as Patsy St. Clair
- Joan Blondell as Crystal St. Clair
- J. Carrol Naish as Leon
- Rafael Campos as Hussein Mohammed
- ZaSu Pitts as Mrs. Katie Shea
- Tom Helmore as Stowe Devlin
- Murvyn Vye as Waxie London
- Vaughn Taylor as Ziggy Dawit
- Frank Ferguson as Mr. Shea
- Chuck Berry (cameo appearance)
- June Blair as chorus girl
- Bess Flowers as nightclub extra

== Soundtrack ==
The soundtrack to the film was jazz-based, featuring performances by Ray Anthony and his Orchestra, with vocals throughout, including the film's title song, sung by Julie Wilson. Both Wilson and Anthony had roles in the film. Wilson played singer Ivy Corlane, while Anthony, with his Orchestra, played himself.

== Reception ==
According to MGM records the film earned $870,000 in the US and Canada, and $650,000 elsewhere, resulting in a loss of $804,000.

== See also ==
- List of American films of 1957
