= Longtime Companion =

- Film poster
- Directed by: Norman René
- Written by: Craig Lucas
- Produced by: Stan Wlodkowski
- Starring: Stephen Caffrey; Patrick Cassidy; Brian Cousins; Bruce Davison; John Dossett; Mark Lamos; Dermot Mulroney; Mary-Louise Parker; Michael Schoeffling; Campbell Scott
- Cinematography: Tony C. Jannelli
- Edited by: Katherine Wenning
- Music by: Greg De Belles
- Distributed by: The Samuel Goldwyn Company
- Release dates: October 11, 1989 (Mill Valley Film Festival); January 21, 1990 (U.S. Film Festival); May 11, 1990 (New York City)
- Running time: 100 minutes
- Country: United States
- Language: English
- Budget: $3 million
- Box office: $4,609,953

Longtime Companion is a 1989 American romantic drama film directed by Norman René in his feature directorial debut, and starring Bruce Davison, Campbell Scott, Patrick Cassidy, and Mary-Louise Parker. The first wide-release theatrical film to deal with the subject of AIDS, it takes the title from the euphemism The New York Times used during the 1980s to describe the surviving same-sex partner of someone who had died of AIDS.

== Plot ==
Longtime Companion chronicles the first years of the AIDS epidemic as seen through its impact on several gay men and the straight friend of one of them. The film is split into several sections identified by dates.

=== July 3, 1981 ===
Willy, a personal trainer, and his friend John are spending time with affluent gay couple David and Sean at their beach house on Fire Island for the 4th of July. Sean is a screenwriter for the popular daytime soap opera Other People and David comes from a blue blood background and has a large trust fund. Back in the city, Howard is preparing to audition for Sean's soap. His boyfriend is Paul, a business executive, and their next-door neighbor is Lisa, an antiques dealer, whose childhood friend Fuzzy is a lawyer who represents Howard.

That morning, The New York Times publishes its first article about the rise of a new "gay cancer". The news spreads as friends call each other. Some are immediately concerned, others dismissive. Willy meets Fuzzy at a tea dance later in the afternoon and they begin a relationship. Howard lands the role.

=== April 30, 1982 ===
John is the first among the group to be diagnosed with the new disease, contracting pneumonia. Howard is given script pages in which his character is slated to become the first openly gay character on daytime television. He is very concerned about typecasting, fearing that by playing gay he will not be offered other sorts of parts. Willy and Fuzzy move in together.

John dies shortly after his admission to the hospital.

=== June 17, 1983 ===
Willy, Fuzzy, Lisa, David, and Sean gather back on Fire Island with friends Michael and Bob to watch Howard's character come out on the soap opera. The group also discuss a sick neighbor who has become a pariah on the island. That evening, Sean and David argue over Sean's fears that he might be getting sick.

=== September 7, 1984 ===
Paul is hospitalized with toxoplasmosis. Sean is also hospitalized. Willy visits Sean and is so terrified of becoming infected that he dons a surgical mask and protective gown and, when Sean kisses him on the neck, excuses himself to the bathroom to scrub the spot. Michael is also visiting Sean, bringing with him homeopathic preparations and a book by Louise Hay. Howard visits Paul and breaks down sobbing. Paul tries to reassure and comfort him.

=== March 22, 1985 ===
Sean has deteriorated to the point of dementia. David is helping with his writing and deceiving the studio into thinking that Sean is still able to work. Fuzzy tries to get Howard a movie role but the producer refuses to cast him because of the rumor that he has AIDS. The same rumor threatened his role on Other People until Fuzzy got him out of his contract. Paul is back in the hospital following a seizure. David takes Sean for a walk but has to take him home when Sean urinates in a fountain at a park. That night Willy catches Fuzzy checking himself for swollen glands and they talk about their fear of dying.

=== January 4, 1986 ===
Sean has deteriorated to the point of near-catatonia and is in constant pain. He has to be strapped into his bed and has lost control of his bowels and bladder and has to wear adult diapers as a result. After sending Sean's nurse Henry on an errand, David sits with Sean and tells him that it is all right to let go. Sean dies. Willy and Lisa come by to help David, and they pick out a suit for Sean to wear to be cremated. Fuzzy calls GMHC to find a funeral home. Lisa and Willy stumble across a slinky red dress in Sean's closet and consider giving it to the undertaker, but ultimately decide against it.

The four go to a Chinese restaurant to write Sean's obituary and include David as his "longtime companion".

=== May 16, 1987 ===
David has died, and this is the day of his memorial service. Bob and Willy eulogize him. At the following reception, the friends recall a time when David tried on his sister's wedding dress, accidentally tripped, and fell down the stairs, still wearing it.

=== September 10, 1988 ===
Fuzzy and Lisa are volunteering answering phones at GMHC. Willy is a "buddy" to a GMHC client, Alberto.

Howard has been diagnosed with AIDS. Although it is not mentioned, the presumption is that Paul has died. Howard uses his remaining fame to raise money for AIDS causes by hosting a benefit which includes a performance by Finger Lakes Trio of the Village People song "Y.M.C.A." performed in a pastiche of chamber music style.

=== July 19, 1989 ===
Willy, Fuzzy and Lisa walk along the beach. They talk about an upcoming ACT UP demonstration. They talk about remembering a time before AIDS and wonder about finding a cure. The film ends with a momentary fantasy sequence, with the friends and others lost to AIDS appearing with them on the beach, before they vanish again and the three are left to walk off the deserted beach.

== Cast ==
- Stephen Caffrey as Allen "Fuzzy"
- Patrick Cassidy as Howard Palin
- Brian Cousins as Bob
- Bruce Davison as David Elders
- John Dossett as Paul
- Mark Lamos as Sean
- Dermot Mulroney as John Deacon
- Mary-Louise Parker as Lisa
- Michael Schoeffling as Michael
- Campbell Scott as Willy Wollf
- Tanya Berezin as Office Manager
- Welker White as Rochelle
- Marceline Hugot as Reader
- Philip Moon as Bartender
- Hazel Medina as Triage Nurse
- Annie Golden as Heroin Addict
- Freda Foh Shen as Nurse
- Alexandra Neil as Elaine
- Kelly Connell as Script Man
- Brent Barrett as Tommy
- Keith Charles as Martin
- Dan Butler as Walter
- Robi Martin as Transvestite
- Robert Joy as Ron
- Tony Shalhoub as Paul's Doctor
- Pi Douglass as Henry
- David Drake as GMHC Volunteer
- Michael Carmine as Alberto
- Melora Creager as Finger Lakes Trio
- Jesse Hultberg as Finger Lakes Trio
- Lee Kimble as Finger Lakes Trio
- Brad O'Hare as Restaurant Waiter

== Production ==
The beach house featured in the film is located in Fire Island Pines, New York and was built in 1958.

== Critical reception ==
The film received overwhelmingly positive reviews from critics. Rotten Tomatoes reports a score of 92% based on 24 reviews with an average rating of 7.7/10. The site's consensus reads, "Longtime Companion is a sensitive ensemble AIDS drama, lensed with sympathy which builds to a moving finale".

Roger Ebert wrote “Longtime Companion is about friendship and loyalty about finding the courage to be helpful and the humility to be helped.” Peter Travers from Rolling Stone commented “Funny, Touching and Vital, Longtime Companion is the best American movie so far this year. It is also, astonishingly, the first major feature to detail the gay community's battle against the AIDS epidemic.” Leonard Maltin was complimentary: "Craig Lucas' script is insightful, heart-wrenching, and funny. Entire cast is excellent, especially Davison."

== Awards and nominations ==
Award	Category	Nominee(s)	Result
Academy Awards	Best Supporting Actor	Bruce Davison	Nominated
Artios Awards	Best Feature Film Casting – Drama	Jason LaPadura and Natalie Hart	Nominated
Deauville American Film Festival	Critics Award	Norman René	Nominated
GLAAD Media Awards	Outstanding Film – Wide Release		Won
Golden Globe Awards	Best Supporting Actor – Motion Picture	Bruce Davison	Won
Independent Spirit Awards	Best Supporting Male	Bruce Davison	Won
Los Angeles Film Critics Association Awards	Best Supporting Actor	Bruce Davison	Runner-up
National Society of Film Critics Awards	Best Supporting Actor	Bruce Davison	Won
New York Film Critics Circle Awards	Best Supporting Actor	Bruce Davison	Won
Political Film Society Awards	Human Rights		Nominated
Sundance Film Festival	Grand Jury Prize: Dramatic	Norman René	Nominated
Sundance Film Festival	Audience Award: Dramatic	Norman René	Won

The film was screened in the Un Certain Regard section at the 1990 Cannes Film Festival.

== See also ==
- An Early Frost (1985)
- Buddies (1985)
- Parting Glances (1986)
- Fire Island Pines, New York
