= Women in Chains =

- 1972 ABC promo slide for Women in Chains
- Written by: Rita Lakin
- Directed by: Bernard L. Kowalski
- Starring: Ida Lupino; Belinda Montgomery; Lois Nettleton; Jessica Walter; John Larch
- Music by: Charles Fox
- Country of origin: United States
- Original language: English

Production
- Producer: Edward K. Milkis
- Cinematography: Howard Schwartz
- Editor: Argyle Nelson
- Running time: 1:14:03
- Production company: Paramount

Original release
- Network: ABC
- Release: January 25, 1972

Women in Chains is a 1972 American television film directed by Bernard L. Kowalski for ABC's Movie of the Week. The leading players are Ida Lupino, Belinda Montgomery, Lois Nettleton and Jessica Walter.

== Plot ==
Parole officer Sandra Parker (Lois Nettleton) becomes aware of the death of one of her cases, Ginger Stratton, at the hands of brutal prison guard Claire Tyson (Ida Lupino). All too aware of Tyson's impeccable record, Parker and her friend, Assistant District Attorney Helen Anderson (Penny Fuller), come to the conclusion that Tyson is basically untouchable.

Parker hatches a scheme to expose Tyson by going undercover in prison herself. Helen attempts to persuade her that this is foolish but there is no stopping Sandra. She adopts the name Sally Porter, bleaches her hair and gives herself some needle marks as if she were a drug addict.

Helen gives her boss Barney Fielder (John Larch) the appropriate papers for transporting "Sally Porter" to prison, where she finds herself on Ginger's "ward" and begins asking questions of her other inmates.

Outside the prison, Helen Anderson (the only person who knows Sally's real identity) is shot and killed by a boyfriend of one of her cases. Sally must therefore prove Tyson's true credentials before she can escape.

Life in prison moves on and Tyson's "henchwoman" Leila (Barbara Luna) becomes suspicious of all of Sally's questions. At first Tyson is angry with Sally's insolence but begins at one point to warm to her as she shows spirit. However, as Sally attempts to protect Melinda (assigned to the same ward at the same time but innocent of the crime she was convicted for) – so Sally and Melinda find themselves in an impossibly small room for a prolonged period.

Just before lights out – Leila informs Sally that "the word's been passed" and Sally is due to be killed tomorrow. Sally is all too aware that she must escape and makes a run. Initially unaware of the escape attempt, the prison closes for the night – until Tyson does the usual number checks and sounds the alarm.

A chase ensues with Sally still within the prison grounds, where taking one wrong turn brings her face to face with a furious Tyson. The two exchange blows before Sally pins Tyson to the floor putting Tyson's own truncheon across Tyson's throat and kneeling on it.

The struggle is interrupted by the prison governor. As the pair of frantic women are separated, Sally cries out to the governor that she is in fact Sandra Parker, asking him to contact Barney Fielder (Helen's boss) to confirm her identity. As this is taking place, Tyson is frantically explaining to the prison governor that Sally had tried to kill her. Accusing her repeatedly of being "a dirty lying lousy little con". In the film's penultimate scene, the governor looks somewhat disbelievingly at Tyson as Sally (realising she has been believed) cries out "Oh my God". The film ends with Sally walking triumphantly down the corridor which led to her ward – dressed in her ordinary clothes (as opposed to prison uniform).

She promises to reopen Melinda's case.

== Cast ==
=== Guest stars in alphabetical order ===
- Ida Lupino as Tyson
- Belinda Montgomery as Melinda
- Lois Nettleton as Sandra
- Jessica Walter as Dee Dee
- John Larch as Barney

=== Co-starring ===
- Penny Fuller as Helen
- Barbara Luna as Leila
- Hazel Medina as Althea
- Neile Adams as Connie
- Kathy Cannon as Alice

=== Featuring ===
- Lucille Benson as Billie
- Alice Backes as Mrs. Foster
- Barbara Baldavin as Ginger
- William Bryant as Doctor
- Hollie Hayes as Girl
- Judy Strangis as Junkie
- Joyce Jameson as Simpson
- Noah Keen as Warden Grant
- Tracee Ann Lyles as Bea
- Kathleen O'Malley as Girl
- June Whitley Taylor as Policewoman

== Reception ==
Leonard Maltin's TV Movies & Video Guide ranks the film as "Average", stating that "Good production tries hard, but script is unbelievable, performances uneven", while the write-up in Michael Weldon's Psychotronic Encyclopedia of Film opens with "The first women's prison TV-movie stars Ida Lupino as a sadistic warden (see Women's Prison of '55)." Alvin H. Marill in his Movies Made for Television also makes the same observation: "Playing a sadistic prison superintendent, Ida Lupino (in her TV-movie debut) virtually reprised a similar role fifteen years earlier in Women's Prison." Women's Prison, released in February 1955, actually preceded the January 1972 broadcast of Women in Chains by 17 years, and both Weldon and Marill also misstated Lupino's prison position (head guard) in the later film.

It became the third-highest rated original TV movie on U.S. television behind The Night Stalker and Brian's Song, earning a 32.3 rating and 48 share.
