= Twenty-Nine Kisses from Roald Dahl =

- First edition
- Author: Roald Dahl
- Publisher: Michael Joseph; Penguin Books
- Publication date: 1969
- Publication place: United Kingdom
- Media type: hardback
- Pages: 442
- ISBN: 0-7181-0697-0

Twenty-Nine Kisses from Roald Dahl is a 1969 short story collection for adults by Roald Dahl.

The collection contains Someone Like You (1953) and Kiss Kiss (1960), Dahl's second and third short story collections. These twenty-nine stories, written over a period of sixteen years, comprise the core of Dahl's short fiction.

== See also ==
- Danny, the Champion of the World
