= The Mildenhall Treasure =

1999 non-fiction work by Roald Dahl

- First edition (1999)
- Author: Roald Dahl
- Illustrator: Ralph Steadman
- ISBN: 9780224060172
- Dewey Decimal: 936.2643

The Mildenhall Treasure is a non-fiction work written by British author Roald Dahl. It tells the story of the discovery in 1942 near Mildenhall in Suffolk of the Mildenhall Treasure, now held in the British Museum.

== Background ==
Dahl first published his account in the U.S. weekly magazine Saturday Evening Post, on 20 September 1947, under the title He Plowed Up $1,000,000. This was one of the first pieces of journalism ever sold by the fledgling writer. The account—one of Dahl's rare forays into nonfiction—was first published in book form in 1977 in the story collection The Wonderful Story of Henry Sugar and Six More. It was then published as a single edition in 1999 by Jonathan Cape under the title The Mildenhall Treasure, with illustrations by Ralph Steadman.

Shortly before Dahl became a fighter pilot in the RAF, he visited RAF Mildenhall as well as RAF Lakenheath, both located north of the town. Dahl had read in the newspaper about a remarkable find of Roman silver in this remote and lonely part of England. Very interested, a few days later he drove to Mildenhall to interview the ploughman involved, Gordon Butcher. Dahl also interviewed others who knew the story of the hoard, including neighbors, farmworkers, shopkeepers and Butcher's wife.

The hoard was first discovered by Butcher in the winter of 1942 at the height of the Second World War. A hired ploughman, he dug the treasure out the ground with help from a tractor. Butcher supposedly did not recognise the objects for what they were, and his boss, Sidney Ford, took possession of the hoard, which consisted of Roman Silver pieces from East Anglia with pagan themes.

In Dahl's version of events, Ford was fully aware of the significance of the find, but could not bear to part with the treasure. He kept it and restored it in secret, until two of the spoons left out were seen by an unexpected visitor, Dr. Hugh Fawcett.

The treasure was then turned over to the police, who started an investigation. An inquest was held in the summer of 1946. As a result, Butcher was deprived of the full ex gratia reward made to finders of buried gold or silver, since the find had not been reported to the authorities. The find was declared "treasure trove" and acquired by the British Museum in London. Eventually the finders were declared to be Ford and Butcher, who each received a thousand pounds compensation. Butcher had no idea that "had he been allowed [by Ford] to take the treasure home originally, he would have almost certainly have revealed its existence and would thus have become eligible to receive one hundred per cent of its value, which could have been anything between half a million and a million pounds."

After Dahl's article was published in America, he sent half the money to Butcher's family. Dahl later decided to publish a second version of the story, with a few tweaks. Dahl believed the first version revealed too much of his indignation against Sidney Ford. He titled the new version simply 'The Mildenhall Treasure', as the story is now known.

Richard Hobbs, curator of the British Museum, drew the attention of the academic world to the importance of Roald Dahl's account. Hobbs's first encounter with the Mildenhall treasure was in 1977 when, at the age of eight, he was given a copy of Dahl's book. Many children worldwide, having read the story, are drawn to the Roman Britain gallery to see the treasure. Hobbs has since addressed the difficult issues surrounding the actual finding.

== See also ==
- List of Roald Dahl short stories
