= Nunc Dimittis (short story) =

Short story by Roald Dahl

- Short story by Roald Dahl
- Original title: The Devious Bachelor
- Country: United Kingdom
- Language: English
- Genre: Fiction

Publication
- Published in: Magazine
- Publisher: Collier's
- Publication date: 1953

"Nunc Dimittis" is a short story by Roald Dahl. It was first published under the title "The Devious Bachelor" in Colliers in September 1953 and included in the book Someone like You. The story is wholly told from the first-person perspective.

== Plot summary ==
Lionel Lampson, a wealthy middle-aged bachelor and art collector, learns from a gossipy widow, Gladys Ponsonby, that his younger girlfriend Janet de Pelagia thinks of him, among other things, as a "crashing bore". Lionel is scandalised and devises an elaborate revenge. He approaches a local artist, John Royden, and asks him to paint Janet's portrait with the stipulation that she does not know who has commissioned it. Gladys had confided in Lionel that Royden has an unusual method: he paints his female subjects first nude, and then repaints the canvas several times, adding each layer of clothing one stage at a time.

When the portrait is completed, Lionel (who is skilled at restoring and cleaning paintings) removes the additional layers of paint, exposing Janet in her undergarments. He then stages a dinner party for Janet and some of society's elite, where, at the end of the candle-lit meal, the lights are suddenly turned on and the painting is revealed for all to see. Lionel leaves the room unobserved after he sees the shocked look on Janet's face. After hearing a guest roar for some water for Janet (implying that she has fainted), he slips away to his house in the country, basking in the success of his scheme until two days later, when he receives a telephone call from Gladys telling him he is now despised by all his former friends – except her.

But things get even worse: a few days later, Lionel receives a container of excellent caviar along with a letter from Janet, saying that she forgives him and still loves him. Lionel feels deeply ashamed. Not being able to resist his favourite food, he indulges himself and, by the end of the story, begins to feel violently ill. The implication is that Lionel has been poisoned, perhaps fatally, by Janet.

== Adaptation ==
The story was adapted for television, under the title "Depart in Peace", as an episode of Tales of the Unexpected.
