= Philip Howard (journalist) =

British journalist

Philip Charles Nicholas Howard (2 November 1933 – 5 October 2014) was a British journalist who worked for over fifty years at The Times.

Howard was born in London in 1933, the son of Peter Howard, a journalist and captain of the English rugby team, and Doris Metaxa, a tennis player who was a Wimbledon ladies doubles champion. He was educated at Eton College and graduated with First Class Honours in Classics from Trinity College, Oxford. A keen classicist all his life, he was on the committee of the Horatian Society, and was elected in 2002 President of the Classical Association of Great Britain. In 2004 he 'scooped' with evident relish the story of the presentation of an Ode in Pindaric Greek commissioned from an Oxford don for the forthcoming Athens Olympics.

Between 1956 and 1958, Howard undertook his national service with the Black Watch as a motor transport officer. He then joined the Glasgow Herald as a general reporter in 1959, working in the city until 1964. He married Myrtle Houldsworth from Ayrshire, the daughter of Sir Reginald Houldsworth, also in 1959.

Howard joined The Times in 1964, and wrote on many different subjects during his career. In his popular column 'Lost Words' he discussed the meaning of unusual words, and in 'Modern Manners' he offered practical advice on etiquette. He had a highly individual style, and wrote with wit, concision, and allusive humour. He was also the Times' literary editor., and wrote several books including 'The Royal Palaces' (1970), 'London's River' (1975), and 'We Thundered Out: 200 Years of the Times' (1985).
