= Neile Adams =

Filipina-American actress, singer and dancer

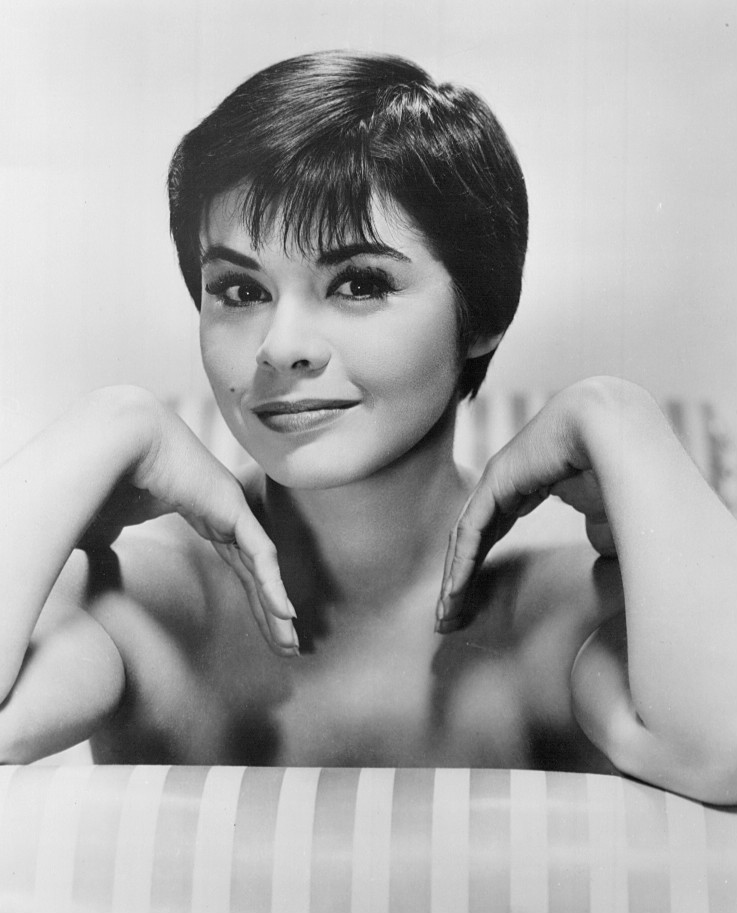
- Adams in 1960
- Born: Maria Ruby Neilam Arrastia y Salvador; July 10, 1932 (age 94); Manila, Philippine Islands
- Education: Rosemary Hall
- Occupations: Actress, singer, dancer
- Years active: 1952–1991
- Known for: This Could Be the Night; Fuzz; Women in Chains
- Spouses: Steve McQueen (m. 1956; div. 1972) Alvin Toffel (m. 1980; died 2005)
- Children: 2, including Chad McQueen
- Relatives: Steven R. McQueen (grandson); Isabel Preysler (niece); Chabeli Iglesias (great-niece); Julio Iglesias Jr. (great-nephew); Enrique Iglesias (great-nephew); Tamara Falcó (great-niece)

Maria Ruby Neilam Arrastia y Salvador (born July 10, 1932), known as Neile Adams, is a Filipina-American actress, singer, and dancer who made more than 20 appearances in films and television series between 1952 and 1991.

== Early life and family ==
Adams was born in Manila, of Chinese, Japanese, Mongolian, Polynesian, Spanish Basque, English, and German descent, on July 10, 1932, the daughter of José Arrastia, of Eurasian descent. Her half-sister was Maria Beatriz Arrastia y Reinares, mother of socialite and television host Isabel Preysler, who in turn was the mother of Enrique Iglesias and Julio Iglesias Jr. She reportedly never met her father. Her mother, Carmen "Miami" Salvador, was a hula dancer of Spanish and German descent.

In her early teens, during the Japanese army's occupation of Manila during World War II, Adams became a spy for the Philippine resistance, carrying messages between guerrilla groups. She later was wounded by shrapnel during the Allied liberation of the island. She moved to the United States in 1948 and attended Rosemary Hall, a private school in Connecticut. She then went to New York to study dancing where she got a scholarship at the Dunham School of Dance and Theatre. To avoid typecasting because of her name, she became known as Neile Adams.

== Career ==
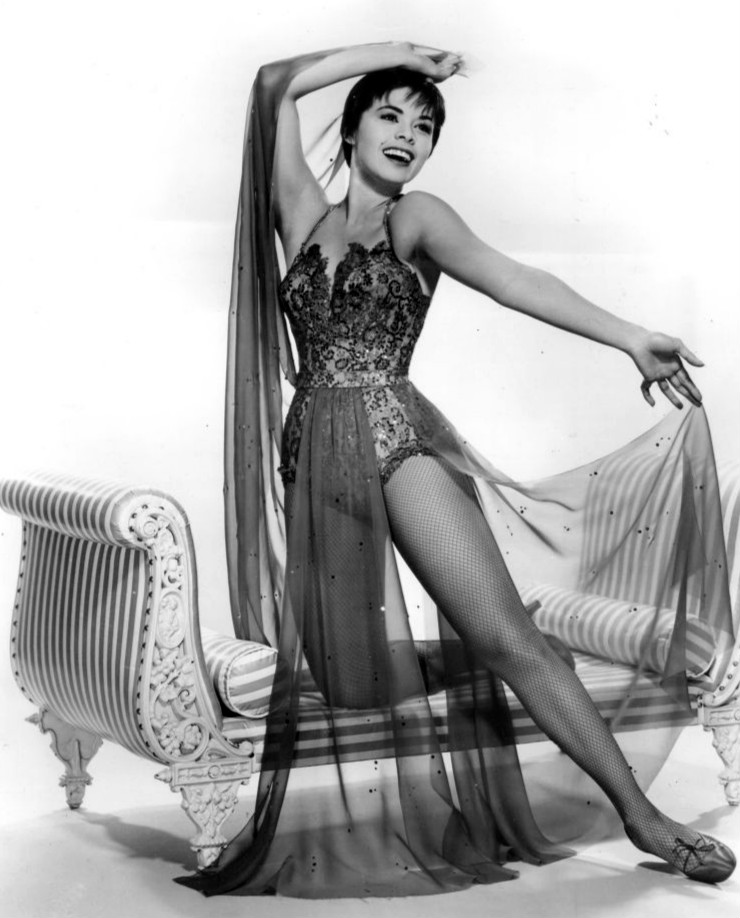
Publicity photo (1960)

In 1958, producer George Abbott offered Adams a role in the Broadway production of Damn Yankees. She was unable to accept because the Versailles Club would not release her from her contract as a dancer. Her Broadway credits include performing in Kismet and The Pajama Game. She also performed in Broadway Bound at The Grand opposite Paul Muni. She married then-struggling actor Steve McQueen four months after their meeting in 1956 while filming MGM’s This Could Be the Night (1957) where she was under contract. She opened the Tropicana Hotel in Las Vegas in 1958 with Dick Shawn and Vivian Blaine.

Her other screen credits include Women in Chains (1972), Fuzz (1972), So Long, Blue Boy (1973), Chu Chu and the Philly Flash (1981), and Buddy Buddy (1981). Her television credits include: The Perry Como Show, two Bob Hope Christmas specials, The Eddie Fisher Show, The Patrice Munsel Show, The Pat Boone Show and The Hollywood Palace. Her dramatic television roles include a 1960 episode of Alfred Hitchcock Presents, titled "Man from the South", with McQueen and Peter Lorre. Two more Alfred Hitchcock episodes followed: a half-hour show directed by Arthur Hiller in which she starred, "One Grave Too Many", and an Alfred Hitchcock Hour episode titled "Ten Minutes from Now". She also appeared on episodes of television series such as The Man from U.N.C.L.E., The Rockford Files, The Bionic Woman, Fantasy Island, and Vega$.

== Filmography ==
=== Film ===
Year	Title	Role	Notes
1952	Grubstake		Western film
1957	This Could Be the Night	Patsy St. Clair	Comedy film
1972	Fuzz	Teddy Carella	Action film
1973	So Long, Blue Boy	Julie Stevens (as Neile Adams McQueen)	Horror film
1981	Chu Chu and the Philly Flash	Car Woman (as Neile McQueen)	Comedy film
1981	Buddy Buddy	Saleswoman (as Neile McQueen)	Farce comedy film

=== Television ===
Year	Title	Role	Notes
1959	Westinghouse Desilu Playhouse	Lupe	Episode: "Border Justice" (2.6)
1960	Alfred Hitchcock Presents	Woman	Episode: "Man from the South" (5.15)
1960	Five Fingers	Rita Juan	Episode: "A Shot in the Dark" (1.15)
1960	Alfred Hitchcock Presents	Irene Helmer	Episode: "One Grave Too Many" (5.32)
1972	Women in Chains	Connie	tv movie
1972	Love, American Style	Peggy Fox (segment "Love and the Out-of-Town Client) (4.13)	Episode: "Love and the Ghost / Love and the Out-of-Town Client / Love and the Secret Habit"
1976	Police Woman	Denise (as Neile Adams-McQueen)	Episode: "Generation of Evil" (2.20)
1977	The Bionic Woman	Valerie Breuer (as Neile Adams-McQueen)	Episode: "Max" (3.10)
1978	Operation Petticoat	Mrs. Lawson (as Neile Adams-McQueen)	Episode: "The Best of Enemies" (1.16)
1978	The Rockford Files	Joyce Brauder (as Neile McQueen)	Episode: "The Competitive Edge" (4.19)
1980	Fantasy Island	Trish (as Neile McQueen)	Episode "The Invisible Woman / The Snowbird" (4.7)
1981	Vega$	Monique Duvalier (as Neile McQueen)	Episode: "French Twist" (3.21)
1985	Hotel	Madelyn Rogers (as Neile McQueen)	Episode: "Saving Grace" (3.6)
1990	Nightmare on the 13th Floor	Saleswoman (as Neile McQueen)	tv movie
1991	Dead on the Money		tv movie

== Personal life ==
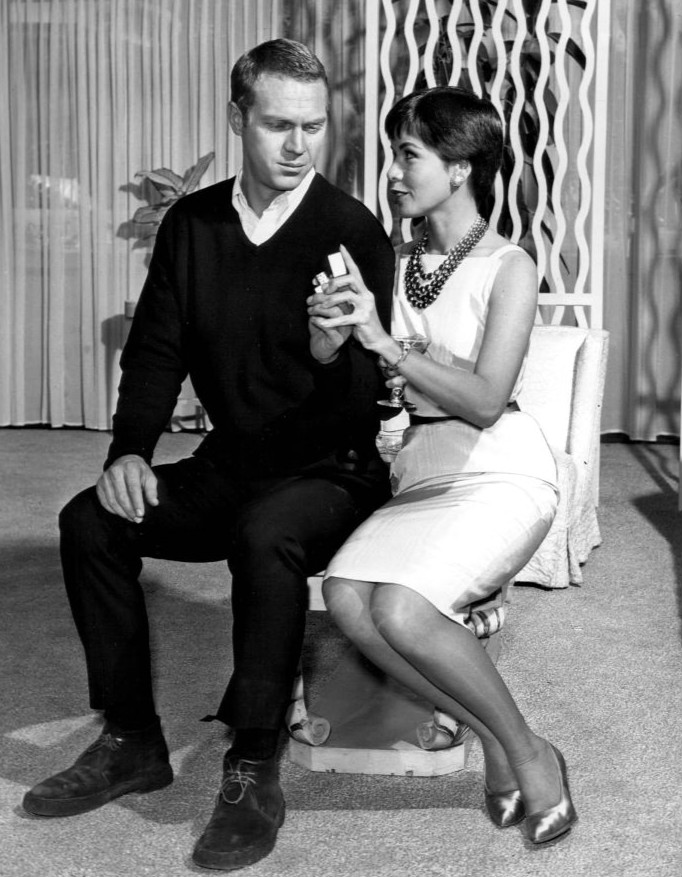
With husband Steve McQueen in Alfred Hitchcock Presents, 1960

Adams met and married American film and television actor Steve McQueen in 1956. The couple had two children together: a daughter, Terry Leslie McQueen, and a son, Chad McQueen. The marriage ended in divorce in 1972. She is the grandmother of actor Steven R. McQueen. She later married Alvin Toffel, a political campaign manager and president of the Norton Simon Museum; they were married until Toffel's death in 2005.

Adams would outlive both of her children, with her daughter Terry dying March 19, 1998 and her son Chad dying on September 11, 2024.

== Archive ==
The Academy Film Archive houses the Steve McQueen-Neile Adams Collection, which consists of personal prints and home movies.

== Selected filmography ==
- Alfred Hitchcock Presents (1960) (Season 5 Episode 15: "Man from the South") as the Woman
- Alfred Hitchcock Presents (1960) (Season 5 Episode 32: "One Grave Too Many") as Irene Helmer
- The Alfred Hitchcock Hour (1964) (Season 2 Episode 26: "Ten Minutes from Now") as Sergeant Louise Marklen
