= My Year =

Book by Roald Dahl

- First edition
- Author: Roald Dahl
- Illustrator: Quentin Blake
- Language: English
- Publisher: Jonathan Cape
- Publication date: 1993
- Publication place: United Kingdom
- Media type: Print (Hardback)
- Pages: 64
- ISBN: 0-224-03647-5

My Year is a book by Roald Dahl published in 1993. It is based on a diary Dahl wrote during the final year of his life. In a month-by-month journey, he reflects on the past and present from many perspectives. Reminiscences of his childhood and adolescence are combined with tips on how to rid your lawn of moles or produce a first-class conker. All of this is woven into Dahl's observations of the changing seasons. It features watercolours by Quentin Blake.

In a 1993 review, The Independent described it as "like a nature diary by Andy Warhol - what in other hands might be slight seems, in Dahl's hands, freakish and astonishing."
