= The Bookseller (short story) =

1987 short story by Roald Dahl

- Short story by Roald Dahl
- Country: United Kingdom
- Language: English
- Genres: Dark comedy, Satire

Publication
- Published in: January 1987
- Publisher: Playboy
- Media type: Print

"The Bookseller" is a short story by British writer Roald Dahl. It was first published in the January 1987 issue of Playboy.

== Plot ==
London bookseller William Buggage and his assistant, Miss Tottle, have been swindling the widows of prominent men by sending fake invoices for pornographic literature supposedly purchased by their recently deceased husbands. The embarrassed widows pay the bill to avoid a public scandal. Buggage is foiled when one of his intended victims points out that her late husband was blind.

== Controversy ==
Dahl's biographer, Jeremy Treglown, states that Dahl took the plot of "The Bookseller" from "Clerical Error" (also published as "Foot In It"), a 1935 short story by James Gould Cozzens. Some readers wrote to Playboy drawing attention to the apparent plagiarism, but these letters were not published. Cozzens's original story had been adapted for television in a 1983 episode of Tales of the Unexpected, a series with which Dahl was closely associated.
