= Vengeance Is Mine Inc. =

Short story by Roald Dahl

- Short story by Roald Dahl
- Country: United Kingdom
- Language: English

Publication
- Published in: More Tales of the Unexpected
- Publication type: Short-story collection
- Publisher: Michael Joseph
- Publication date: 1980

Vengeance is Mine, Inc is a short story by British author Roald Dahl. It was first published in his 1980 book More Tales of the Unexpected.

== Synopsis ==
Two young men (the narrator Claude and his friend George) are lamenting their poverty and discussing the morning newspaper. In it, a society columnist named Lionel Pantaloon gossips about prominent citizens. The narrator gets a brilliant idea. He reckons the people Pantaloon insults would like to punch him in the nose, but they're unable to because of their standing and position. He proposes he and George start a business named Vengeance is Mine, Inc., performing such acts of vengeance for a price. Their list of services includes a black eye, a punch in the nose, getting tossed naked into Fifth Avenue and putting a rattlesnake (venom extracted) in their car. They have cards printed explaining their business. They deliver these to the offended parties, and within two days they have several customers. They dream about the riches they'll be paid and life in grand hotels. The narrator has another brainstorm and realizes they can get paid multiple times for the same act. Each customer will think the vengeance was for them alone. Noting that they have three orders to punch Pantaloon in the nose, they decide to handle him first.

The plan is simple: Pantaloon is always at the Penguin Club, so they'll show up and ask for him to come out. George will punch him and then escape in the rented 1934 Chevrolet the narrator has waiting. They telegram the three customers with the details of the encounter so the customers can watch. They procure a fake moustache for George. At the appointed time, George approaches the doorman and passes him a note to give to Pantaloon. He claims to be a Soviet Consulate worker with a life-and-death matter. Pantaloon comes out to talk with him. George punches him on the nose that lifts him off his feet. He then dashes to the car and escapes. They soon realize someone is following them. They stop, only to learn that it is one of their customers. He explains it was the funniest thing he has ever seen and happily pays them double their fee. He advises them to get out of town before Pantaloon figures out what happened. The men wait around another day to receive the rest of their payment and then leave. They discuss their plan to bet the money on a horse race, and daydream about how wealthy and important they will become. "Perhaps we might even get ourselves mentioned in Lionel Pantaloon's column," George muses.

== Adaptations ==
The story was adapted for television in a 1980 episode of Tales of the Unexpected (Season 3, Episode 4). Norm Macdonald used the story as the basis of his 1998 film Dirty Work.
