= Beware of the Dog (short story) =

- Short story by Roald Dahl
- Country: United States
- Genres: war, adventure

Publication
- Published in: Over to You: Ten Stories of Flyers and Flying
- Publication type: Short story collection
- Publisher: Reynal & Hitchcock
- Publication date: 1946

"Beware of the Dog" is a 1944 World War II story by Roald Dahl which was originally published in Harper's Magazine and later appeared in his Over to You collection. Its basic plot was adapted into the 1964 movie 36 Hours, starring James Garner and Rod Taylor, and the TV movie Breaking Point in 1989.

== Story ==
In the latter years of World War II, Royal Air Force Spitfire pilot Peter Williamson sustains a serious injury (the loss of a leg from a cannon shell) while flying a mission over German-controlled Vichy France. He bails out of his plane and later awakens to find himself in a hospital bed in Brighton, on the English coast. As he recovers, strange things keep happening, such as hearing the sound of Junkers Ju 88s (German warplanes) through the window when none would have been over Brighton without there being sirens and anti-aircraft fire. The nurse also mentions that the hospital water is very hard, when Williamson knows from attending school in Brighton that its water is soft.

Suspicious and frightened, Williamson drags himself to the window and sees a wooden sign, "Garde au Chien" (French for "Beware of the Dog"). He now knows that he is actually in Vichy France, and that the English caregivers are Germans in disguise. When they send in a fake RAF Wing Commander to convince him to divulge information about his squadron, he stares him straight in the eye and says nothing more than "My name is Peter Williamson. My rank is Squadron Leader and my number is nine, seven, two, four, five, seven."
