= Man from the South =

1948 short story by Roald Dahl

- Short story by Roald Dahl
- Country: United States
- Language: English
- Genre: Fiction

Publication
- Published in: Collier's
- Publication type: Magazine
- Publication date: 1948
- Published in English: 1948

"Man from the South" is a short story by Roald Dahl originally published as "Collector's Item" in Collier's magazine in September 1948. It has been adapted several times for television and film, including a 1960 version that aired as an episode of Alfred Hitchcock Presents starring Steve McQueen, Neile Adams, and Peter Lorre.

== Plot synopsis ==
While vacationing at a resort in Jamaica, the narrator encounters an elderly South American man named Carlos. They are soon joined by a young United States Navy cadet, who boasts about the reliability of his cigarette lighter. Carlos offers to bet his green Cadillac against the American's left little finger that the American cannot ignite the lighter ten times in a row. The American accepts, with the narrator agreeing to act as referee and hold the car key, and they adjourn to Carlos's room.

Carlos has a maid bring in the necessary supplies, then ties the American's left wrist to the table and begins the challenge. After the eighth successful strike, a woman bursts into the room and takes the knife Carlos has held ready to sever the American's finger. She explains that Carlos is mentally disturbed, having played this game so often in their home country that they had to flee in order to keep the authorities from committing him to a psychiatric hospital. He has taken 47 fingers and lost 11 cars, but no longer has anything of his own to bet with; she won it all from him long ago, including the car he claimed to own. As the narrator offers the key to her, she reaches out to take it with a hand that has only its thumb and one finger still attached.

== Television adaptations ==
=== Alfred Hitchcock Presents (1960 episode) ===
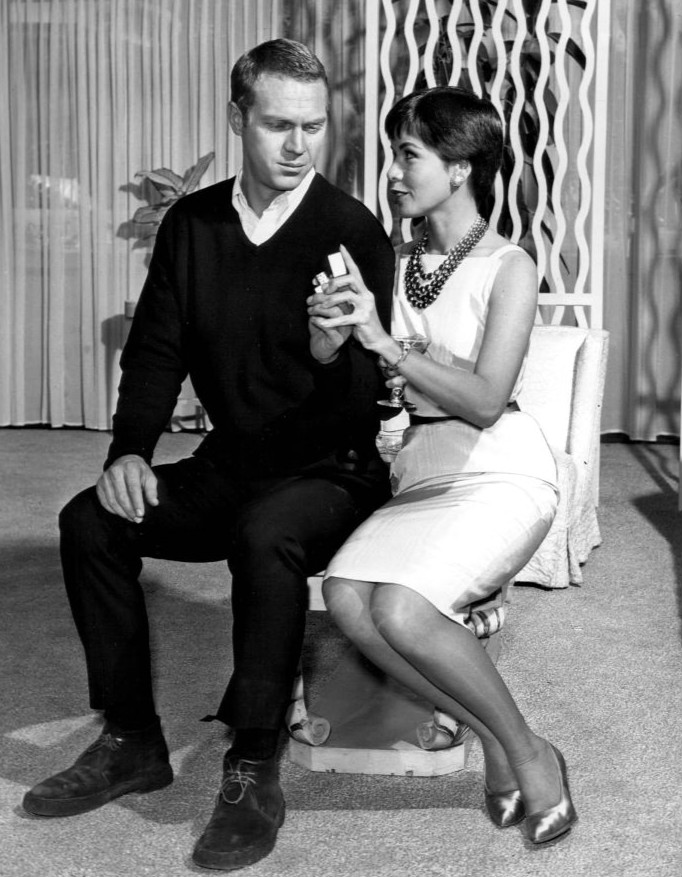
Steve McQueen and Neile Adams in Alfred Hitchcock Presents, 1960

"Man from the South" was adapted as a 1960 episode of Alfred Hitchcock Presents with the same title, directed by Norman Lloyd from a teleplay by William Fay. Set in Las Vegas, the episode stars Steve McQueen as the gambler, Peter Lorre as Carlos, and McQueen's then-wife Neile Adams as a young woman McQueen's character tries to impress. The car itself is merely described as a convertible. Although the mysterious woman who abruptly storms in is wearing gloves, her index, middle, and ring fingers are missing. In this adaptation, as part of the dramatic denouement after Carlos's wife ends the bet, the gambler tries to relieve the stress of the young woman by lighting her cigarette; the lighter fails to ignite, a sly indicator of how narrowly he avoided losing.

==== 1960 cast ====
- Alfred Hitchcock as the Host
- Steve McQueen as the Gambler
- Peter Lorre as Carlos
- Neile Adams as a Woman
- Katherine Squire as Carlos's Wife
- Tyler McVey as the Referee
- Marc Cavell as the Bellhop
- Phil Gordon as the Bartender

=== Tales of the Unexpected (1979 episode) ===
The episode was remade in 1979 as the first episode of Dahl's television anthology series Tales of the Unexpected. The episode was written by Kevin Goldstein-Jackson and directed by Michael Tuchner. In this version, the car was a Jaguar.

==== 1979 cast ====
- Roald Dahl as the Host
- José Ferrer as Carlos
- Pamela Stephenson as Cathy
- Michael Ontkean as Tommy
- Cyril Luckham as Rawlsden
- Katy Jurado as the Mysterious Woman

=== Alfred Hitchcock Presents (1985 episode) ===
The episode was remade for the 1985 revival of Alfred Hitchcock Presents. Steve De Jarnatt wrote the teleplay based on William Fay's 1960 teleplay, and also directed. The episode featured Steven Bauer in McQueen's role, John Huston as Carlos, Melanie Griffith (Bauer's wife at the time), Kim Novak, and Tippi Hedren (Griffith's mother). In this adaptation, the lighter successfully lights ten times. When the wife comes in, the tenth flame is blown out; Carlos is startled and drops the cleaver, nearly cutting off the young man's finger. After it is all over and he is about to free his hand, the young girl attempts to light a cigarette for the gambler, and the lighter fails. The wife has only her index finger left.

==== 1985 cast ====
- Alfred Hitchcock as the Host (colorized 1960 introduction)
- John Huston as Carlos
- Melanie Griffith as the Girl
- Steven Bauer as the Gambler
- Tippi Hedren as the Waitress
- Kim Novak as Rosa
- Jack Thibeau as Bronson
- Danny De La Paz as the Bellhop

== Radio adaptations ==
In 1949, the Dahl story was adapted by June Thomson for an episode of Radio City Playhouse. The adaptation, titled "Collector's Item", split the 30 minute run time with an adaptation of a Ray Bradbury story, titled "The Lake". Shortly after meeting in the bar, Carlos offers the gambler his green 1948 Cadillac parked outside. Due to the tastes of the time, some of the more grisly details were omitted from the presentation. The independent observer (the "referee") character realizes the female is a victim of the gambler, but we do not learn the exact details of the gambler's previous bets.

In 2009, it was dramatized on BBC Radio 4 with Andrew Sachs playing the sinister old man.

== Film adaptations ==
=== Ninaithale Inikkum ===
Dahl's story was adapted for a scene from the 1980 Tamil film Ninaithale Inikkum, which involves a wager by a millionaire that a young man could not flick a cigarette into his lips ten times in a row without dropping it. The millionaire put up his Toyota car against the young man's little finger. The young man managed it nine times in a row, but chickened out and refused a tenth attempt, thereby defaulting on the wager. The cigarette flick was a signature move by actor Rajinikanth.

=== Four Rooms ===
The story was the basis for "The Man From Hollywood", Quentin Tarantino's segment of the 1995 anthology film Four Rooms. The characters in this segment explicitly discuss the 1960 Alfred Hitchcock Presents episode, although they incorrectly refer to it as "The Man from Rio". In this version, the lighter fails on the first try, and the referee chops off the finger and swiftly departs.

1995 cast (as part of Four Rooms)

- Quentin Tarantino as Chester Rush, who offers the bet
- Jennifer Beals as Angela
- Tim Roth as Ted the Bellhop, who acts as referee
- Paul Calderón as Norman, who accepts the bet
- Bruce Willis as Leo (uncredited)

"Cut", a segment of the 2004 anthology film Three... Extremes (directed by Park Chan-wook), was also inspired by the story.
