= Rhyme Stew =

Collection of poems by Roald Dahl

- First edition
- Author: Roald Dahl
- Illustrator: Quentin Blake
- Language: English
- Publisher: Jonathan Cape (UK); Viking (US)
- Publication date: 1989 (UK) & (1990) (US)
- Publication place: United Kingdom
- Media type: Print (Hardback)

Rhyme Stew is a 1989 collection of poems for children by Roald Dahl, illustrated by Quentin Blake. In a sense it is a more adult version of Revolting Rhymes (1982).

The poems either parody well known fairy tales (The Emperor's New Clothes, Ali Baba, Hansel and Gretel, Aladdin) nursery rhymes (As I was going to St Ives, Hey Diddle Diddle, Mary, Mary Quite Contrary) or are little stories thought up by Dahl himself.

Most of the stories contain slight sexual references. Due to slightly risqué material this book carries a warning that it is unsuitable for "small readers". In late 1990, the Library of Congress reclassified the collection as an adult book.

== Contents ==
- Dick Whittington and His Cat
- St. Ives
- A Hand in the Bird
- The Tortoise and the Hare
- The Price of Debauchery
- Physical Training
- The Emperor's New Clothes
- A Little Nut Tree
- The Dentist and the Crocodile
- Hot and Cold
- Ali Baba and the Forty Thieves
- Hey Diddle Diddle
- Mary, Mary
- Hansel and Gretel
- Aladdin and the Magic Lamp
