= Radio City Playhouse =

American radio dramatic anthology series (1948–1950)

Radio City Playhouse is a live half-hour anthology series that aired on NBC Radio from July 3, 1948 to January 1, 1950. Directed by Harry W. Junkin, with music by Dr. Roy Shield, and announcers Bob Warren (1948–49) and Fred Collins (1949–50), the series presented original radio dramas regardless of the fame of the author, so long as they were considered 'good'. Many of the broadcasts have survived and can be heard on websites specializing in old-time radio.

Richard McDonagh, who managed the script division of NBC, said that writers were encouraged "to tell a story in their own fashion" in a way suitable to radio. Writers for the series included John Galsworthy, Cornell Woolrich, Ernest Kinoy, and Ray Bradbury.

Actors who appeared on the program included Luis van Rooten, who had a one-man show on the July 11, 1949, episode. He portrayed "a neurotic actor who is confronted by eleven characters he has played in the past". Others were John Larkin, Jan Miner, Claudia Morgan, Bernard Grant, and at least one hyphenate, Dolores Sutton, who both co-wrote and co-starred in “Sibling”, the episode airing on December 11, 1949.

Richard McDonagh and Richard P. MacDonnell were the producers. Junkin was the narrator. The program was sustaining and was broadcast on Saturdays at 10 p.m. Eastern Time. It debuted as a summer replacement for Kay Kyser's program on Saturdays at 10 p.m. Eastern Time. In 1949 it was broadcast on Mondays at 10:30 p.m. E. T.

Some episodes consisted of two playlets, such as October 16, 1949, with the presentation of "The Lake" and "Collector’s Item".

== Critical response ==
A review of the July 3, 1948, episode in the trade publication Variety commended Junkin's directing and star Jan Minor's performance.
