= My Uncle Oswald =

1979 novel by Roald Dahl

- First edition
- Author: Roald Dahl
- Language: English
- Genre: sex comedy
- Publisher: Michael Joseph (UK)
- Publication date: October 1979
- Publication place: United Kingdom
- Media type: Print (hardback and paperback)
- Pages: 222 pp. (hardback edition) * 208 pp. (paperback edition)
- ISBN: 0-7181-1864-2 (hardback edition) & ISBN 0-14-005577-0 (paperback edition)
- OCLC: 5310105

My Uncle Oswald is a 1979 sex comedy novel written by Roald Dahl. The novel stars Uncle Oswald, a character who previously appeared in "The Visitor" and "Bitch", two short stories also written by Roald Dahl (and which can both be found in the 1974 book Switch Bitch).

== Plot summary ==
When Uncle Oswald discovers the sexually invigorating properties of the "Sudanese Blister Beetle", he devises a plan to steal the semen of great men and sell it to women who want to have children fathered by geniuses.

=== Victims ===
Victims of Oswald's plot in order of appearance in the book:

- Alfonso XIII, King of Spain
- Pierre-Auguste Renoir, French painter
- Claude Monet, French painter
- Igor Stravinsky, Russian composer
- Pablo Picasso, Spanish painter. In fact, Uncle Oswald and his accomplice are unsuccessful here: Picasso pounces on the accomplice before she has a chance to use a condom to collect his semen.
- Henri Matisse, French artist
- Marcel Proust, French novelist
- Vaslav Nijinsky, Polish-born Russian ballet dancer and choreographer
- James Joyce, expatriate Irish writer and poet
- Giacomo Puccini, Italian operatic composer
- Sergei Rachmaninoff, Russian composer, conductor and pianist
- Sigmund Freud, Austrian neurologist and founder of psychoanalysis
- Albert Einstein, German-born theoretical physicist
- Thomas Mann, German novelist
- Joseph Conrad, Polish-born British novelist
- H. G. Wells, British writer
- Rudyard Kipling, Indian-born British author and poet
- Sir Arthur Conan Doyle, British writer and creator of Sherlock Holmes
- George Bernard Shaw, Irish playwright
- Albert I of Belgium
- Victor Emmanuel III of Italy
- Peter I of Serbia
- George II of Greece
- Boris III of Bulgaria
- Ferdinand of Romania
- Christian X of Denmark
- Gustaf V of Sweden

== Reception ==
In his 1980 review, Vance Bourjaily said:

What can be said is that My Uncle Oswald provides four or five hours of effortless reading and some amusing scenes, mostly of the kind film makers have taught us to call soft porn—so soft, indeed, that at times they turn out almost fluffy. The tone is that of a gentleman telling ribald anecdotes to his male guests after dinner. The leer is civilized... the dialog gets mean and raunchy, but the physical detail is kept decorous.... Mr. Dahl's guests are not invited to vicarious orgy, then, nor will they hear a disguised lecture by a wicked satirist of morals and manners.... Summer reading.

Christopher Lehmann-Haupt called it "a festival of bad taste that is at heart so innocent that we soon forgive it and enjoy ourselves," "thoroughly juvenile fun," and said "I haven't had so much fun of this sort since my last all-night joke-telling session at summer camp."

Movieweb named it as one of 8 Roald Dahl books that need a screen adaptation.
