= Switch Bitch =

1974 book by Roald Dahl

- First US edition
- Author: Roald Dahl
- Cover artist: Charles Shields (US)
- Genre: Suspense, thriller
- Publisher: Michael Joseph (UK); Alfred A. Knopf (US)
- Publication date: 1974
- Media type: Print
- Pages: 140
- ISBN: 0-14-004179-6
- OCLC: 4800308

Switch Bitch (1974) is a book of adult short stories by British writer Roald Dahl. Four stories, originally published in Playboy between 1965 and 1974, are collected. They are linked by themes of rape by deception: in each one, some major act of cunning, cruelty, or hedonism underpins the sexuality.

The book is notable for its introduction of the Uncle Oswald character, a wealthy hobbyist and gadabout who stars in both the first and last stories (although the first story seemingly presages his imminent decline and death). He later appeared in Dahl's comic novel for adults, My Uncle Oswald. Oswald is a male fantasy figure described as "the greatest fornicator of all time", his adventures recounted by a nephew who inherits his diaries and decides to edit them for publication. Despite the stories in Switch Bitch being dark and cynical in tone, the Oswald tales are also humorous and satirical, resembling crude comic anecdotes.

== Contents and introductions ==
=== "The Visitor" ===
Wealthy gadabout Oswald Hendryks Cornelius is stranded in Cairo when a Syrian businessman picks him up by the side of the road and offers him a room for the night in his desert mansion. While there Oswald meets the man's wife and daughter, both of whom are extremely beautiful. A midnight liaison occurs and Oswald wonders whom it was he spent the night with, when the businessman reveals to him new information that could be fatal.

=== "The Great Switcheroo" ===
Two middle-class suburban men at a neighbourhood party devise a ruse whereby each can sleep with the other's wife, without either wife realising the deception. They compare sexual techniques beforehand, and one receives a rude awakening the morning after.

=== "The Last Act" ===
After being widowed a woman reconnects with the man she left for her late husband years ago. The man is a gynaecologist, recently separated, and unbeknownst to the woman still harbours a grudge for her breaking off their relationship. He begins to seduce her, and a terrible revenge ensues.

=== "Bitch" ===
Oswald Cornelius becomes entangled with a Belgian olfactory expert who claims to have discovered an eighth smell-related nerve that, when stimulated, unlocks certain aspects of human sexual experience. The expert develops a perfume to stimulate the nerve, causing chaos when it is exposed during a high society dinner for an American women's movement that Oswald is attending.

== Reception ==
The stories have been criticised for their cruel and misogynistic elements. The central conceit of "The Last Act", in particular, has been described by Jeremy Treglown, Dahl's biographer, as having "no purpose as a mechanism other than to lead to a crudely sensationalist conclusion", and by British novelist Zoe Heller as describing "in obscene detail the rape of a menopausal woman by a gynecologist." In the same article for The New Republic she commented generally on Dahl's later adult stories: "the sexual sadism is at its crudest and the 'wit' at its most vestigial... [they] are almost unbearable to read."

Despite this negative reception, the stories have also been praised. Alfred Hitchcock, for whose television programme Dahl's story "Man from the South" was adapted, was fond of "The Visitor" and in later life recounted its plot on American talk shows as a dark joke.

== See also ==
- Kiss Kiss
- Someone like You
- Over to You: Ten Stories of Flyers and Flying
