= Over to You: Ten Stories of Flyers and Flying =

1946 short story collection by Roald Dahl

- First edition
- Author: Roald Dahl
- Language: English
- Publisher: Reynal & Hitchcock
- Publication date: 1946

Over to You: Ten Stories of Flyers and Flying is a collection of short stories by Roald Dahl. It was published in 1946 by Reynal & Hitchcock.

This early collection is a stylistic departure from Dahl's better known stories. For the most part they do not use suspense or twist endings and are instead more slow-paced and reflective.

Over to You contains the following stories:

- "An African Story"
- "Only This"
- "Katina"
- "Beware of the Dog"
- "They Shall Not Grow Old"
- "Someone Like You"
- "Death of an Old Old Man"
- "Madame Rosette"
- "A Piece of Cake"
- "Yesterday Was Beautiful"

== Plot summaries ==
=== An African Story ===
An old African man lives in a shack with Judson. Judson cannot stand the sound of the old man's dog, and one day breaks its back with a bamboo cane. The old man puts the dog out of its misery.

One night, the old man sees a black mamba snake drinking the milk from one of his cows. He tells Judson that a boy is stealing the milk, and instructs Judson to catch him. Judson is bitten by the snake and dies. The old man allows the snake to have Judson's share of the milk.

=== Only This ===
An old woman is awoken in her cottage by the sound of bomber aircraft overhead. On the table is a picture of her son, wearing his Royal Air Force uniform. In her mind, she sees him smiling at her in the cockpit. The plane is hit but he continues to smile. As the cabin fills with smoke, she tries to free him from his seat but he is unconscious. The plane crashes. Back in the cottage, the sound of bombers returning can be heard, but the woman doesn't move: "She had been dead for some time."

=== Katina ===
In Paramythia, Greece, three RAF meet a girl called Katina, whose family have been killed in a German bombing raid. In the next bombing raid, Katina stands out in the open, shouting at the bomber aircraft. She is "adopted" by the squadron and travels with them. With further German raids, the situation becomes increasingly desperate. In another raid, Katina again stands in a field, shaking her fists at the aircraft, and she is killed by a Messerschmitt.
