= Someone like You (short story collection) =

1953 collection of short stories by Roald Dahl

Someone Like You
- Dust-jacket from the first edition
- Author: Roald Dahl
- Language: English
- Genre: Mystery, horror, science fiction
- Publisher: Alfred A. Knopf
- Publication date: 1953
- Publication place: United Kingdom
- Media type: Print (hardback)
- Pages: 359 pp

Someone Like You is the second collection of short stories by Roald Dahl. It was published in 1953 by Alfred Knopf.

== Contents ==
It contains eighteen short stories. The final four are grouped under a collective title.

- "Taste" (The New Yorker, December 8, 1951): A wine snob wagers his host that he can correctly identify the claret that is being served with dinner. The host wagers his daughter's hand in marriage against two of the snob's houses. The snob makes a great show of correctly guessing the wine, but the maid reveals that he peeked at the wine before it was served.
- "Lamb to the Slaughter" (Harper's Magazine, September 1953): Policeman Patrick Maloney stuns his wife Mary by announcing the end of their marriage while she is six months pregnant. In shock, she kills him with a frozen leg of lamb. She puts it in the oven and then goes to the grocer to create an alibi. Mary calls the police to report the murder and sits in a daze as her husband's colleagues investigate the scene for several hours. As they search for the blunt instrument that could be the murder weapon, one of the officers points out that Mary's oven is still on. She asks them to turn it off and help themselves. The officers muse over where the murder weapon is while they eat the cooked lamb.
- "Man from the South" (First published as "Collector's Item" in Collier's, September 1948): Four strangers meet at a hotel pool. While lighting cigarettes, a soldier brags that his lighter never fails. The elderly man in the group wagers his Cadillac that the soldier's lighter cannot work ten times in a row. He insists the soldier put up his left pinky against the car. The quartet adjourns to the man's room, where he ties the soldier's hand to a table and stands over it with a knife while he ignites the lighter. They are interrupted by the man's companion who puts a stop to the wager. She explains he has been doing this for years, losing cars or collecting fingers, and now he has no real assets because she has won them all from him. She is missing several fingers.
- "The Soldier": An ex-soldier is bothered by a splinter in his foot as he walks his dog at night. He is flooded by memories of his childhood and the war. They intermingle with his confusion about what has been happening at his home, where he wonders if his wife has been making changes to it in order to confuse him. When he gets home, he goes to his bedroom with a knife in his hand. The woman in the bed claims not to be his wife.
- "My Lady Love, My Dove" (The New Yorker, June 13, 1952): Pamela and Arthur are hosting the Snapes for the weekend. Pamela suggest bugging their guest room for fun. Arthur reluctantly hides a microphone in the room. The couples play bridge, and the Snapes lose four pounds to their hosts. In their room, Mr. Snape reprimands his wife. Pamela and Arthur are shocked to realize that the Snapes are hustlers who play bridge for a living and make their bids in code. Pamela insists that they learn to do the same.
- "Dip in the Pool" (The New Yorker, January 19, 1952): On a cruise in rough seas, Mr. Botibol decides to bet on the ship's running distance in the nightly auction. He wagers on the lowest number and invests almost two years worth of savings, estimating his 200£ ticket should yield winnings of nearly $6,000. When the seas are calm in the morning, he resolves to jump overboard to slow the ship and win the pool of money. He makes sure a passenger sees him before he jumps, unaware that she has a caretaker. The caretaker dismisses her tale of a man jumping overboard and admonishes her for being on deck alone.
- "Galloping Foxley" (Town & Country, November 1953): A businessman finds his contented commute disrupted by a stranger who looks familiar. After several days, he realizes the stranger is Bruce Foxley who used to terrorize him at Harrow School. Foxley would put so much force into his canings that he would gallop at the poor boy from a distance. As all of Foxley's abuse comes flooding back to him, the businessman decides to confront his bully. When he introduces himself as a Harrow alumni, his fellow passenger cordially returns the greeting and says he attended Eton.
- "Skin" (The New Yorker, May 17, 1952): A destitute old man named Drioli notices a painting in a gallery. He recognizes it as the work of his former pupil Kalmuck. Recalling their friendship, Drioli remembers the night he got drunk and asked Kalmuck to tattoo his back. Kalmuck was so pleased with the work that he signed it. When the gallery tries to prevent Drioli from viewing the art up close, he strips off his shirt and shows he has an original work by the artist. People begin to bid on the art, suggesting fantastical ways in which it could be displayed. A few weeks later, the framed tattoo somehow turns up for sale in Buenos Aires.
- "Poison" (Collier's, June 1950): Harry Pope is motionless in bed, sweating, and panicked. He tells his friend that a krait has crawled onto his stomach, underneath the covers, and asks for a doctor. Dr. Ganderbai, a local Indian doctor, rushes to help. After pumping chloroform onto Harry's stomach, the doctor and his friend lift the sheets, but there is no sign of the snake. Ganderbai wonders if there actually was a snake. Harry erupts in fury and hurls racial slurs at the doctor.
- "The Wish": A boy imagines the red on a hallway carpet is lava and that the black are poisonous snakes. The only safe color on the carpet is yellow. He ends up falling into the snakes.
- "Neck": A columnist spends the weekend at the country estate of Sir Basil Turton's estate. The butler has a deep disdain for Lady Turton, a gold digger who openly flirts with another guest. The next day, the Lady and the guest are taking photographs in the sculpture garden, and Sir Basil observes them kissing. Lady Turton poses with her head through a hole in a Henry Moore carving and gets stuck. When the butler fetches implements to free her, he brings a saw and an axe and subtly suggests his employer use the axe.
- "The Sound Machine": Klausner creates a machine that makes ultrasound audible. He is shocked to realize that plants emit terrifying noises when they are cut. He tries to demonstrate the sound for the doctor who lives next door. He cuts into a beech tree which seems to attack him in self-defense. He insists that the puzzled doctor treat the tree's wound with iodine.
- "Nunc Dimittis" (Collier's, September 1953): Lionel Lampton is idly rich and having drinks with a woman who has just had her portrait painted by John Roydon. She reveals that he paints society women in three sittings, first in the nude, and then in undergarments, before the final layer of clothing. As she gets tipsy, she gossips about what Janet de Pelagia had to say about dining with Lionel. The cruelty of Janet's caricature of him as smelly, lovesick, and worst of all, boring, fires a vindictiveness in Lionel.

He secretly commissions a portrait of Janet from Roydon and visits Europe while it is finished. The portrait is publicly displayed and admired before it is delivered to Roydon's house, where he expertly removes the outer layer of paint, revealing Janet in her undergarments. He throws a society dinner by candelight, with Janet in attendance. At the end of dinner, he turns on the lights and leaves as Janet reacts in horror at seeing her portrait.
Lionel becomes a social outcast. Eventually, Janet sends him a conciliatory letter and a half pound of caviar, which he finds irresistible. As he eats it, he finds that he feels sicker and sicker.

- "The Great Automatic Grammatisator" (republished as The Great Automatic Grammatizator anthology): A mechanically minded man reasons that the rules of grammar are fixed by certain, almost mathematical principles. By exploiting this idea, he is able to create a mammoth machine that can write a prize-winning novel in roughly fifteen minutes. The story ends on a fearful note, as more and more of the world's writers are forced into licensing their names—and all hope of human creativity—to the machine.

With the recent advent of LLMs, after seven decades since its conception, this story has once again attracted interest.

- "Claud's Dog"

- "The Ratcatcher": A ratcatcher comes to Claud's petrol station to combat an infestation. He scatters some poisoned oats around a hayrick across the road. When he arrives to collect the dead rats a few days later, he is peeved to find none.

To regain the waning respect of his clients, the ratcatcher puts a ferret and a rat in his shirt and stands motionless while the ferret kills the rat. He then bets the men he can kill a rat without using his hands or feet. To win the wager, he kills it with his teeth. As he spits out the blood, he claims rat blood is the secret ingredient in liquorice.

- "Rummins": Claud Cubbage is walking his greyhound when he comes across Rummins. He tells Rummins a ratcatcher has been to the hayrick across from Claud's petrol station. Rummins huffs that all hayricks have rats, but Claud insists the infestation in this one is unusual.

Rummins and his son Bert decide to dismantle the hayrick. Claud and the narrator watch as the rats start to flee the structure. As Bert cuts bales out of the hayrick, his knife hits an obstruction. He uneasily grinds through it upon his father's urging.
The narrator recalls when Rummins built the hayrick in June. He and Claud and other men, like the town drunk Ole Jimmy, had helped Rummins and Bert with the effort. They were in a hurry to finish before a storm approached. During a break, Claud and the narrator crossed the road to the station to make sandwiches. Jimmy disappeared for a nap, having drunk some beer. When Claud and the narrator returned, Jimmy was gone. Rummins assumed he had gone home and continues frantically piling hay as the storm grew nearer.
Finally, Bert cuts through the obstruction and throws down a bale to his father. He is horrified by what he sees. Rummins knows right away what Bert has bisected and runs away as his son starts to scream.

- "Mr. Feasey" (First published as "Dog Race" in The New Yorker, July 25, 1953): Claud and Gordon swap a ringer for the greyhound they have been racing at Mr. Feasey's tracks. The original dog, Black Panther, is a terrible runner, barely able to beat out dogs who come up lame. Having established his incompetence, Claud brings Jackie, a nearly identical dog who is very fast, to Mr. Feasey's latest race.

Knowing how inept Black Panther is, Mr. Feasey refuses to let him run until Claud wagers a quid that the dog will not finish last. Gordon's job is to place small bets with all the bookies at the race. The odds on Black Panther are 25-1. Jackie easily wins the race, and Feasey realizes the dog is a ringer. When Gordon collects his winnings, none of the bookies pay out.

- "Mr. Hoddy": Claud Cubbage is visiting his fiancee Clarice's father, Mr. Hoddy. He knows Mr. Hoddy will look down on his scheme to win greyhound races with a ringer. So, he regales his host with tales of the maggot farm he is planning to open with his friend Gordon. Mr. Hoddy is disgusted by the notion.

== Reception and legacy ==
In May 1954, Groff Conklin, in Galaxy Science Fiction, called Someone Like You "certainly the most distinguished book of short stories of 1953 ... all superb". In August 1954, writing in The Magazine of Fantasy & Science Fiction, Anthony Boucher and J. Francis McComas praised the collection's "subtly devastating murder stories [as well as] two biting science-fantasies, plus a few unclassifiable gems" singling out Taste as a "perfect story," and concluded the volume "belong[ed] on your shelves somewhere in the Beerbohm-Collier-Saki section".

Van Morrison's song "Someone Like You" is named after this collection.

== Adaptations ==
- In 1949, "Man from the South" was adapted as "Collector's Item" for Radio City Playhouse.
- In 1950, "Poison" was adapted for Escape.
- In 1952, "The Sound Machine" was adapted for CBS Television Workshop.
- In 1956, Lehman Engel wrote a one-act opera based on "The Soldier".
- In 1975, "Nunc Dimittis" was adapted for Uit de wereld van Roald Dahl.
- Glimmerglass Opera commissioned an opera from William Schumann based on "Taste". It premiered in 1988 as A Question of Taste.
- In 2009, "Man from the South" was adapted for BBC Radio 4 with Andrew Sachs.
- The 2015 Russian short film Taste (Vkus) directed by Ekaterina Krasner is adapted from Taste by Roald Dahl.
- In 2016, "My Lady Love, My Dove" was adapted for 15 Minute Drama.
- In 2024, "Poison" and "The Ratcatcher" were adapted by Wes Anderson as short films for Netflix.

Alfred Hitchcock Presents adapted several stories from the book:

- "Lamb to the Slaughter" (1958) with Barbara Bel Geddes in the lead.
- "Dip in the Pool" (1958)
- "Poison" (1958), directed by Alfred Hitchcock
- "Man from the South" (1960) with Steve McQueen, Peter Lorre, and Neile Adams.
- "Man from the South" (1985) with John Huston, Melanie Griffith, and Steven Bauer.

Tales of the Unexpected also adapted several stories from the book:

- "Lamb to the Slaughter" (1979) with Susan George and Brian Blessed.
- "Dip in the Pool" (1979)
- "Man from the South" (1979) with the author as host and Jose Ferrer.
- "My Lady Love, My Dove" (1979)
- "Galloping Foxley" (1979)
- "Neck" (1979)
- "The Sound Machine" (1979)
- "Nunc Dimittis" (1979)
- "Taste" (1980)
- "Poison" (1980)

== Awards ==
- Edgar Award, 1954
