= James Franco filmography =

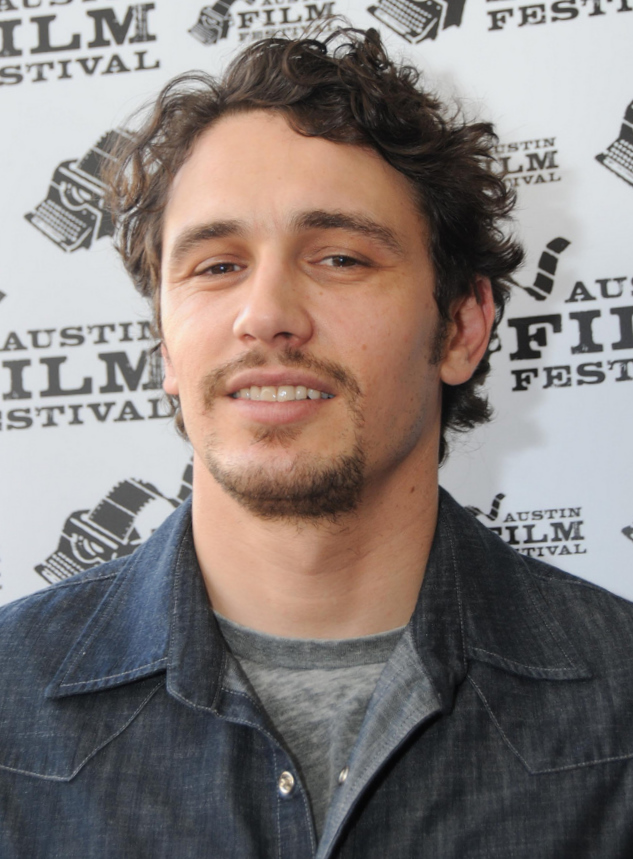
Franco at the Austin Film Festival in 2011

James Franco is an American actor and filmmaker. He began acting on television, guest-starring in Pacific Blue (1997). He landed his breakthrough role in the comedy-drama television series Freaks and Geeks (1999–2000). After his film debut in Never Been Kissed (1999), Franco won a Golden Globe Award for Best Actor – Miniseries or Television Film and was nominated for Screen Actors Guild Award and Primetime Emmy Award in the same categories for playing the eponymous actor in the 2001 television biopic James Dean. He went on to play Harry Osborn in the superhero film Spider-Man (2002), and reprised the role in its sequels Spider-Man 2 (2004) and Spider-Man 3 (2007). For the last of the three, he garnered a nomination for the Saturn Award for Best Supporting Actor. His only screen appearance of 2003 was in the ballet film The Company. Franco directed and starred in the comedy The Ape (2005).

After playing one of the title roles in the romantic drama Tristan & Isolde (2006), Franco starred in the Tony Bill-directed war drama Flyboys (2006). Two years later, he played against type in the action-comedy film Pineapple Express, and earned critical acclaim for portraying Scott Smith in the biographical film Milk alongside Sean Penn. For the former, he was nominated for a Golden Globe Award for Best Actor – Comedy. Franco portrayed the trapped canyoneer Aron Ralston in 127 Hours (2010), a survival drama, which earned him nominations for an Academy Award, BAFTA Award, Screen Actors Guild Award and Golden Globe Award, all for Best Actor. Franco appeared in four films in 2011, including the poorly-received fantasy film Your Highness, and the science fiction film Rise of the Planet of the Apes (2011), a critical and commercial success.

Franco had six roles in 2012 none of which had much success except the crime-comedy film Spring Breakers, in which he played a gangster to highly positive reviews. The following year, Franco played the title role in the fantasy film Oz the Great and Powerful, and the disaster film This Is the End saw him play a fictional version of himself. For the first one, he was nominated for the Teen Choice Award for Choice Movie Actor - Fantasy. Also in 2013, he directed and starred in the drama As I Lay Dying. He starred in the action thriller Good People (2014), an adaptation of Marcus Sakey's 2008 novel of the same name. In the 2014 controversial satirical comedy The Interview, he was seen as a journalist instructed to assassinate a North Korean leader. He had nine film releases in 2015, most of which failed financially except the animated film The Little Prince, a modest commercial success. In 2017, Franco directed and starred in The Disaster Artist as Tommy Wiseau, for which he won a Golden Globe Award for Best Actor – Motion Picture Musical or Comedy.

== Film ==
Key
†	Denotes films that have not yet been released

=== As actor ===
James Franco's film appearances
Year	Title	Role	Notes	Ref.
1999	Never Been Kissed	Jason Way		
2000	Whatever It Takes	Chris Campbell		
2000	If Tomorrow Comes	Devin		
2001	Mean People Suck	Casey Mitchell	Short film	
2002	Spider-Man	Harry Osborn		
2002	Deuces Wild	Tino Verona		
2002	Mother Ghost	Skateboarder Guy		
2002	Sonny	Sonny Phillips		
2002	City by the Sea	Joey LaMarca		
2003	The Company	Josh Williams		
2004	Spider-Man 2	Harry Osborn		
2005	The Ape	Harry Walker		
2005	The Great Raid	Cpt. Robert Prince		
2005	Fool's Gold	Brent		
2006	Tristan & Isolde	Prince Tristan		
2006	Annapolis	Jake Huard		
2006	The Wicker Man	Bar Guy #1		
2006	Flyboys	Blaine Rawlings		
2006	The Dead Girl	Derek		
2006	The Holiday	Himself	Uncredited cameo	
2007	An American Crime	Andy Gordon		
2007	Interview	Voice on phone	Voice, cameo	
2007	Finishing the Game	Rob Force		
2007	Knocked Up	Himself	Uncredited cameo	
2007	Spider-Man 3	Harry Osborn / New Goblin		
2007	Good Time Max	Max		
2007	In the Valley of Elah	Sergeant Dan Carnelli		
2008	Camille	Silas Parker		
2008	Pineapple Express	Saul Silver		
2008	Nights in Rodanthe	Dr. Mark Flanner	Uncredited	
2008	Milk	Scott Smith		
2010	Howl	Allen Ginsberg		
2010	Date Night	Tom "Taste" Felton		
2010	Shadows and Lies	William Vincent		
2010	Eat Pray Love	David Piccolo		
2010	127 Hours	Aron Ralston		
2010	Love & Distrust	Travis	Segment: "Grasshopper"	
2011	The Green Hornet	Danny "Crystal" Clear	Uncredited cameo	
2011	Your Highness	Prince Fabious		
2011	The Broken Tower	Hart Crane		
2011	Rise of the Planet of the Apes	Will Rodman		
2011	Sal	Milton Katselas		
2012	About Cherry	Francis		
2012	Maladies	James		
2012	The Iceman	Marty Freeman		
2012	Spring Breakers	Alien		
2012	The Letter	Tyrone		
2012	The Color of Time (aka Tar)	C. K. Williams		
2013	Interior. Leather Bar.	Himself		
2013	Lovelace	Hugh Hefner		
2013	Oz the Great and Powerful	Oscar Diggs		
2013	As I Lay Dying	Darl Bundren		
2013	This Is the End	Himself		
2013	Palo Alto	Mr. B	Based on his own book	
2013	Child of God	Jerry		
2013	Third Person	Richard "Rick" Weiss		
2013	Homefront	Morgan "Gator" Bodine		
2014	Veronica Mars	Himself	Uncredited cameo	
2014	Dawn of the Planet of the Apes	Will Rodman	Uncredited cameo	
2014	Good People	Tom Wright		
2014	The Sound and the Fury	Benjy Compson		
2014	The Interview	Dave Skylark		
2015	Don Quixote: The Ingenious Gentleman of La Mancha	Pasamonte		
2015	True Story	Christian Longo		
2015	Yosemite	Phil		
2015	I Am Michael	Michael Glatze		
2015	Queen of the Desert	Henry Cadogan		
2015	Every Thing Will Be Fine	Tomas Eldan		
2015	Wild Horses	Ben Briggs		
2015	The Heyday of the Insensitive Bastards	Conrad		
2015	The Adderall Diaries	Stephen Elliott		
2015	The Little Prince	The Fox	Voice	
2015	Memoria	Mr. Wyckoff		
2015	The Night Before	Himself		
2016	Goat	Mitch		
2016	Sausage Party	Druggie	Voice	
2016	King Cobra	Joseph "Joe" Kerekes		
2016	Burn Country	Lindsay		
2016	The Caged Pillows	David Del Rosario	Voice, short film	
2016	In Dubious Battle	Mac McLeod		
2016	Why Him?	Laird Mayhew		
2017	The Labyrinth	Narrator	Voice	
2017	The Institute	Dr. Cairn		
2017	Actors Anonymous	Jake Lamont		
2017	The Show	Male Host		
2017	The Disaster Artist	Tommy Wiseau		
2017	Alien: Covenant – Prologue: Last Supper	Jacob Branson	Short film	
2017	Alien: Covenant	Jacob Branson	Uncredited cameo	
2017	Don't Come Back from the Moon	Roman Smalley		
2017	The Vault	Ed Maas		
2017	The Mad Whale	Edward Fry		
2018	Future World	The Warlord		
2018	Kin	Taylor Balik		
2018	The Ballad of Buster Scruggs	Cowboy	Segment: "Near Algodones"	
2018	Pretenders	Maxwell		
2019	Zeroville	Ike "Vikar" Jerome		
2019	Arctic Dogs	Lemmy	Voice	
2024	The Price of Money: A Largo Winch Adventure	Ezio Burntwood		
2024	Hey Joe	Dean Barry		
2025	Squali	Robert Price		
2026	Confession	Vladimir		
2027	John Rambo †	TBA	Post-production	
TBA	Kill the Czar †	TBA	Post-production	
TBA	The Long Home †	Dallas Hardin	Post-production	
TBA	Castro's Daughter †	Fidel Castro	Post-production	
TBA	Golden State Killer †	Detective	Post-production	
TBA	The Razor's Edge †	Dante	Post-production	
TBA	Foster †	Donald "Don" Foster	Post-production	
TBA	Runaway †		Post-production	
TBA	Welcome Home †	Jake	Post-production	
TBA	Turnbuckle †	Meat Daddy	Post-production	
TBA	Love Meets The Sunshine †	Jacob	Post-production	
TBA	Something's In There †		Post-production	
TBA	Toad †		Filming	

=== As director ===
Year	Title	Credited as			Notes	Ref(s)
Year	Title	Director	Writer	Producer	Notes	Ref(s)
2005	The Ape	Yes	Yes	Executive		
2005	Fool's Gold	Yes	Yes	No		
2007	Good Time Max	Yes	Yes	No		
2009	The Feast of Stephen	Yes	Yes	No	Short film	
2010	Saturday Night	Yes	No	No	Documentary	
2011	The Broken Tower	Yes	Yes	Yes	Also editor, created for Franco's thesis project at NYU.	
2011	Sal	Yes	Story	No		
2011	My Own Private River	Yes	No	No	Re-contextualized version of My Own Private Idaho; Also editor and composer	
2013	Interior. Leather Bar.	Yes	No	Yes	Co-directed with Travis Mathews; Also cinematographer	
2013	As I Lay Dying	Yes	Yes	No		
2013	Child of God	Yes	Yes	No		
2014	The Sound and the Fury	Yes	No	No		
2016	In Dubious Battle	Yes	No	Yes		
2017	The Institute	Yes	No	Executive	Co-directed with Pamela Romanowsky	
2017	The Disaster Artist	Yes	No	Yes		
2018	Future World	Yes	No	Yes	Co-directed with Bruce Thierry-Chung	
2018	Pretenders	Yes	No	No		
2019	Zeroville	Yes	No	No		
TBA	The Long Home †	Yes	No	Yes		
TBA	Bukowski †	Yes	Yes	No	Post-production	

=== As producer ===
Year	Title	Notes	Ref(s)
2013	Kink	Documentary	
2014	The Interview	Executive producer	
2015	Yosemite	Executive producer	
2015	I Am Michael		
2015	The Adderall Diaries		
2016	Goat		
2016	King Cobra		
2016	Why Him?	Executive producer	
2016	L.A. Series	Executive producer	
2017	The Labyrinth	Executive producer	
2017	Actors Anonymous	Executive producer	
2017	Don't Come Back from the Moon		
2017	The Mad Whale		

== Television ==
Year	Title	Role	Notes	Ref.
1997	Pacific Blue	Brian	Episode: "Matters of the Heart"	
1998	To Serve and Protect	Kristin Carter	Television film	
1999	Profiler	Stevie	Episode: "Three Carat Crisis"	
1999–2000	Freaks and Geeks	Daniel Desario	18 episodes	
2000	At Any Cost	Mike Roberts	Television film	
2001	James Dean	James Dean	Television film	
2007–2008	General Hospital: Night Shift	Franco	13 episodes	
2008, 2009, 2014, 2017	Saturday Night Live	Himself / Host	4 episodes	
2009–2012	General Hospital	Franco	20 episodes	
2009	81st Academy Awards	Saul Silver	Television special	
2010	30 Rock	Himself	Episode: "Klaus and Greta"	
2011	83rd Academy Awards	Himself / Co–host	Television special	
2012	FCU: Fact Checkers Unit	James	Episode: "James Franco Is Preggers"	
2012	Hollywood Heights	Osborne "Oz" Silver	Recurring role	
2013	The Mindy Project	Dr. Paul Leotard	2 episodes	
2013	Comedy Central Roast of James Franco	Roastee	Television special	
2014	Naked and Afraid	Himself	Television special	
2015	Deadbeat	Johnny Penis	Episode: "The Polaroid Flasher"	
2016	Angie Tribeca	Sgt. Eddie Pepper	6 episodes	
2016	11.22.63	Jake Epping	8 episodes; also producer and directed episode: "The Truth"	
2016	Mother, May I Sleep with Danger?	Play Director	Television film; also writer	
2017	High School Lover	Rick Winters	Television film; also executive producer	
2017–2019	The Deuce	Vincent Martino / Frankie Martino	25 episodes; also executive producer and directed 4 episodes	

== Video games ==
Year	Title	Artist	Role	Ref.
2007	Spider-Man 3	Harry Osborn / New Goblin		

== Music videos ==
Year	Title	Artist	Role	Ref.
2013	"City of Angels"	Thirty Seconds to Mars	Himself	
2013	"Bound 3"	James Franco and Seth Rogen	Kanye West	
2016	"Only in America"	Riff Raff	Riff Raff	

== Web ==
Year	Title	Role	Notes	Ref.
2014–2017	Making a Scene with James Franco	Himself / Various characters		
2026	Love, Lies & Frank	Jimmy Frank	Vertical drama	

== See also ==
- List of awards and nominations received by James Franco

== Bibliography ==
- Hensons, Beatrice (February 22, 2011). James Franco: The Living Renaissance Man - A Look at the Many Roles He Plays in Life. Ebook.GD Publishing. ISBN 978-1-61323-018-3.
- Strong, Martin Charles; Griffin, Brendon (2008). Lights, camera, sound tracks. Canongate. ISBN 978-1-84767-003-8.
- Lentz, Harris M. (2001). Science Fiction, Horror & Fantasy Film and Television Credits: Television shows. McFarland. ISBN 978-0-7864-0952-5.
- Sam, Ford; De Kosnik, Abigail; Harrington, C. Lee (2011). The Survival of Soap Opera: Transformations for a New Media Era. University Press of Mississippi. ISBN 978-1-60473-717-2.
- Roman, James (February 17, 2009). Bigger Than Blockbusters: Movies That Defined America: Movies That Defined America. ABC-CLIO. ISBN 978-0-313-08740-0.
