= List of awards and nominations received by James Franco =

James Franco awards and nominations
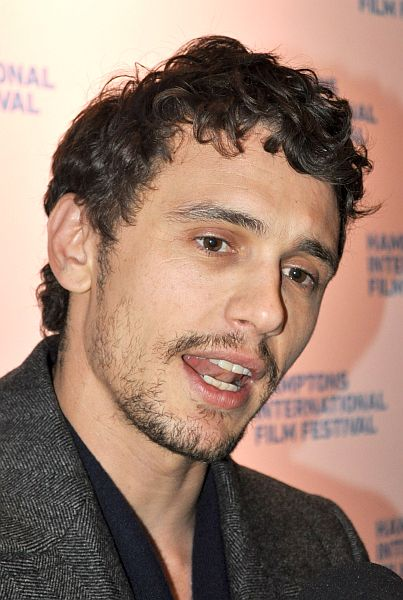
- Franco in 2010
Awards and nominations
Award	Wins	Nominations
Academy Awards	0	1
BAFTA Awards	0	1
Critics' Choice Awards	3	6
Golden Globe Awards	2	4
Primetime Emmy Awards	0	3
Screen Actors Guild Awards	0	4

Totals (Note: Certain award groups do not simply award one winner. They acknowledge several different recipients, have runners-up, and have third place. Since this is a specific recognition and is different from losing an award, runner-up mentions are considered wins in this award tally. For simplification and to avoid errors, each award in this list has been presumed to have had a prior nomination.)
- Wins: 33
- Nominations: 112

American actor and filmmaker James Franco has received several awards and nominations for his work. His breakthrough was as the titular late actor in the biographical television film James Dean (2001), for which he won the Golden Globe Award for Best Actor in a Miniseries or Television Film and was nominated for the Emmy and SAG in that category. He received a Critics' Choice Movie Award for Best Acting Ensemble and nominations for the Critics' Choice Movie Award for Best Supporting Actor and SAG for Best Cast for his role in Milk (2008). Franco's roles in Pineapple Express (2008) and as Aron Ralston 127 Hours (2010) both earned him nominations for the Golden Globe for Best Actor, (Note: The former was nominated in the musical or comedy category and the latter in the drama category.) the latter of which also earned him a nomination for the Academy Award, BAFTA, Critics' Choice, and SAG in that category.

His hosting of the 83rd Academy Awards and the short form variety show Making a Scene earned him additional Emmy nominations, for Outstanding Special Class Program and Outstanding Short Form Variety Series, respectively. Franco won a second Golden Globe and received nominations for the Critics' Choice and SAG for Best Actor for portraying Tommy Wiseau in the biopic The Disaster Artist (2017), which he also directed.

== Major associations ==
=== Academy Awards ===
Year	Nominated work	Category	Result
2011	127 Hours	Best Actor	Nominated

=== BAFTA Awards ===
Year	Nominated work	Category	Result
2011	127 Hours	Best Actor in a Leading Role	Nominated

=== Golden Globe Awards ===
Year	Nominated work	Category	Result
2002	James Dean	Best Actor – Miniseries or Television Film	Won
2009	Pineapple Express	Best Actor – Motion Picture Musical or Comedy	Nominated
2011	127 Hours	Best Actor – Motion Picture Drama	Nominated
2018	The Disaster Artist	Best Actor – Motion Picture Musical or Comedy	Won

=== Grammy Awards ===
Year	Nominated work	Category	Result
2015	Actors Anonymous	Best Spoken Word Album	Nominated

=== Emmy Awards ===
Year	Nominated work	Category	Result
2002	James Dean	Outstanding Lead Actor in a Miniseries or a Movie	Nominated
2011	83rd Academy Awards	Outstanding Special Class Program	Nominated
2016	Making a Scene with James Franco	Outstanding Short Form Variety Series	Nominated

=== Screen Actors Guild Awards ===
Year	Nominated work	Category	Result
2002	James Dean	Outstanding Performance by a Male Actor in a Miniseries or Television Movie	Nominated
2009	Milk	Outstanding Performance by a Cast in a Motion Picture	Nominated
2011	127 Hours	Outstanding Performance by a Male Actor in a Leading Role	Nominated
2018	The Disaster Artist	Outstanding Performance by a Male Actor in a Leading Role	Nominated

== Other awards and nominations ==
=== Critics Awards ===
Year	Nominated work	Category	Result
Critics' Choice Movie Awards
2002	James Dean	Best Actor - TV Film	Won
2009	Milk	Best Supporting Actor	Nominated
2009	Milk	Best Acting Ensemble	Won
2011	127 Hours	Best Actor	Nominated
2018	The Disaster Artist	Best Actor	Nominated
2018	The Disaster Artist	Best Actor in a Comedy	Won
Central Ohio Film Critics
2009	Milk	Actor of the Year	Nominated
2009	Pineapple Express	Actor of the Year	Nominated
2011	127 Hours	Actor of the Year	Won
2011	Date Night	Actor of the Year	Won
2011	Eat, Pray, Love	Actor of the Year	Won
2011	Howl	Actor of the Year	Won
2011	127 Hours	Best Actor	Won
2014	Spring Breakers	Best Supporting Actor	Won
Chicago Film Critics Association
2010	127 Hours	Best Actor	Nominated
2013	Spring Breakers	Best Supporting Actor	Nominated
2017	The Disaster Artist	Best Actor	Nominated
Dallas-Fort Worth Film Critics Association
2010	127 Hours	Best Actor	Won
2017	The Disaster Artist	Best Actor	Nominated
Denver Film Critics Society
2010	127 Hours	Best Actor	Nominated
2013	Spring Breakers	Best Supporting Actor	Nominated
Detroit Film Critics Society
2010	127 Hours	Best Actor	Nominated
2013	Spring Breakers	Best Supporting Actor	Nominated
2017	The Disaster Artist	Best Actor	Won
FilmOut San Diego
2015	I Am Michael	Best Actor	Won
Gay and Lesbian Entertainment Critics Association
2011	127 Hours	Film Performance of the Year – Actor	Nominated
2011	Howl	Film Performance of the Year – Actor	Nominated
2013	Spring Breakers	Film Performance of the Year – Actor	Nominated
2013	—N/a	Wilde Artist of the Year	Won
Houston Film Critics Society Awards
2017	The Disaster Artist	Best Actor	Won
Indiana Film Journalists Association
2010	127 Hours	Best Actor	Won
Iowa Film Critics
2011	127 Hours	Best Actor	Nominated
Las Vegas Film Critics Society
2011	127 Hours	Best Actor	Won
Los Angeles Film Critics Association
2013	Spring Breakers	Best Supporting Actor	Won
2017	The Disaster Artist	Best Actor	2nd Place
National Society of Film Critics
2014	Spring Breakers	Best Supporting Actor	Won
New York Film Critics Circle
2013	Spring Breakers	Best Supporting Actor	2nd Place
New York Film Critics Online Awards
2010	127 Hours	Best Actor	Won
North Texas Film Critics Association
2010	127 Hours	Best Actor	3rd Place
Online Film Critics Society
2011	127 Hours	Best Actor	Nominated
2017	The Disaster Artist	Best Actor	Nominated
Phoenix Film Critics Society
2010	127 Hours	Best Actor	Nominated
San Diego Film Critics Society
2010	127 Hours	Best Actor	Nominated
San Francisco Film Critics Circle
2013	Spring Breakers	Best Supporting Actor	Won
2017	The Disaster Artist	Best Actor	Nominated
Southeastern Film Critics Association
2010	127 Hours	Best Actor	2nd Place
St. Louis Film Critics Association
2010	127 Hours	Best Actor	Nominated
2010	127 Hours	Best Scene	Won
2017	The Disaster Artist	Best Actor	Nominated
Toronto Film Critics Association
2010	127 Hours	Best Actor	Nominated
2013	Spring Breakers	Best Supporting Actor	3rd Place
Utah Film Critics Association
2010	127 Hours	Best Actor	Won
Vancouver Film Critics Circle
2011	127 Hours	Best Actor	Nominated
Washington D.C. Area Film Critics Association
2010	127 Hours	Best Actor	Nominated
2013	Spring Breakers	Best Supporting Actor	Nominated
2017	The Disaster Artist	Best Actor	Nominated
Women Film Critics Circle
2014	The Interview	Best Actor in a Comedy (shared with Seth Rogen)	Won

=== Empire Awards ===
Year	Nominated work	Category	Result
2011	127 Hours	Best Actor	Nominated

=== Festival Awards ===
Year	Nominated work	Category	Result
Berlin International Film Festival
2010	The Feast of Stephen	Best Short Film (as writer, director)	Won
Cannes Film Festival
2013	As I Lay Dying	Un Certain Regard (as writer, director)	Nominated
Capri Hollywood International Film Festival
2017	The Disaster Artist	Best Actor	Won
Chicago International Film Festival
2010	The Feast of Stephen	Best Short Film (as writer, director)	Nominated
FilmOut San Diego
2015	I Am Michael	Best Actor	Won
Hamptons International Film Festival
2010	The Clerk's Tale	Best Short Film	Nominated
Hollywood Film Festival
2008	—N/a	Breakthrough Actor of the Year	Won
New York Film Festival
2013	Child of God	Best Film (as writer, director)	Nominated
Rome Film Festival
2012	Dream	Best Short Film (as director)	Nominated
San Sebastián International Film Festival
2017	The Disaster Artist	Golden Shell (as producer, director)	Won
Santa Barbara International Film Festival
2011	127 Hours	Outstanding Performance of the Year Award	Won
SXSW Film Festival
2012	Saturday Night	Audience Award (as director)	Nominated
Venice Film Festival
2013	Child of God	Golden Lion (as writer, director)	Nominated
2014	—N/a	Jaeger-LeCoultre Glory to the Filmmaker Award	Won

=== Independent Spirit Awards ===
Year	Nominated work	Category	Result
2008	Milk	Best Supporting Male	Won
2010	127 Hours	Best Male Lead	Won
2018	The Disaster Artist	Best Male Lead	Nominated

=== Golden Raspberry Awards ===
Year	Nominated work	Category	Result
2012	Your Highness	Worst Supporting Actor	Nominated
2020	Zeroville	Worst Director	Nominated
2020	Zeroville	Worst Actor	Nominated

=== Hasty Pudding Theatricals ===
Year	Nominated work	Category	Result
2009	—N/a	Man of the Year	Won

=== MTV Movie Awards ===
Year	Nominated work	Category	Result
2008	Spider-Man 3	Best Fight	Nominated
2009	Pineapple Express	Best Fight	Nominated
2009	Pineapple Express	Best Comedic Performance	Nominated
2009	Milk	Best Kiss	Nominated
2011	127 Hours	Best Jaw-Dropping Moment	Nominated
2014	This Is the End	Best Fight	Nominated
2014	Spring Breakers	Best Kiss	Nominated
2015	The Interview	Best Kiss	Nominated
2015	The Interview	Best Duo	Nominated

=== People's Choice Awards ===
Year	Nominated work	Category	Result
2014	This Is The End	Favorite Comedic Movie Actor	Nominated

=== Satellite Awards ===
Year	Nominated work	Category	Result
2008	Milk	Best Supporting Actor	Nominated
2010	127 Hours	Best Actor - Drama	Nominated
2018	The Disaster Artist	Best Actor – Motion Picture	Nominated

=== Saturn Awards ===
Year	Nominated work	Category	Result
2008	Spider-Man 3	Best Supporting Actor	Nominated

=== Young Artist Awards ===
Year	Nominated work	Category	Result
2000	Freaks and Geeks	Best Performance in a TV Series: Young Ensemble	Nominated

=== Miscellaneous film and television awards ===
Year	Nominated work	Category	Result
Alliance of Women Film Journalists
2010	127 Hours	Best Actor	Nominated
2010	127 Hours	Bravest Performance Award	Nominated
2010	127 Hours	Unforgettable Moment	Nominated
Awards Circuit Community Awards
2008	Milk	Best Cast Ensemble	Nominated
2008	Milk	Best Actor in a Supporting Role	2nd Place
2010	127 Hours	Best Actor	2nd Place
Chlotrudis Awards
2003	City by the Sea	Best Supporting Actor	Nominated
2014	As I Lay Dying	Best Adapted Screen Play (as writer, director)	Won
Cinema Eye Honors
2013	Interior. Leather Bar.	Heterodox Award (as director)	Nominated
Gotham Independent Film Awards
2017	The Disaster Artist	Best Actor	Won
Golden Shmoe Awards
2010	127 Hours	Best Actor	Nominated
2010	—N/a	Celebrity of the Year	Won
2013	Spring Breakers	Best Supporting Actor	Nominated
Hollywood Film Awards
2008	—N/a	Actor of the Year	Won
International Cinephile Society Awards
2014	Spring Breakers	Best Supporting Actor	Won
International Online Cinema Awards
2014	Spring Breakers	Best Supporting Actor	Won
2014	Palo Alto	Best Adapted Screen Play (as writer)	Nominated
Italian Online Movie Awards
2011	127 Hours	Best Actor	Nominated
National Movie Awards
2011	127 Hours	Best Actor	Nominated
Online Film and Television Association
2002	James Dean	Best Actor - Motion Picture or Miniseries	Nominated
2011	127 Hours	Best Actor	Nominated
Phoenix Film Critics Society Awards
2010	127 Hours	Best Actor	Nominated
Rembrandt Awards
2012	127 Hours	Best International Actor	Nominated
Streamy Awards
2015	Making a Scene with James Franco	Best Actor	Nominated
Teen Choice Awards
2000	Whatever It Takes	Choice Movie: Villain	Nominated
2007	Spider-Man 3	Choice Movie: Rumble	Nominated
2010	Oz the Great and Powerful	Choice Movie Actor: Sci-Fi/Fantasy	Nominated
2015	True Story	Choice Movie Actor: Drama	Nominated
Village Voice Film Poll
2013	Spring Breakers	Best Supporting Actor	Won
Young Hollywood Awards
2014	The Interview	Best Bromance (with Seth Rogen)	Nominated
