= Rabbit Bandini Productions =

American film production company

- Company type: Private
- Industry: Film, television
- Founded: 2003
- Headquarters: Burbank, California, U.S.
- Key people: James Franco; Vince Jolivette

Rabbit Bandini Productions is a film and television production company founded in 2003 by actors/filmmakers James Franco and Vince Jolivette. The name comes from combining the titular hero from John Updike's Rabbit tetralogy with the hero of John Fante's Ask the Dust, Arturo Bandini. The logo consists of a crudely drawn rabbit as well as the company name.

== Works ==
Recent credits include director Gia Coppola's drama Palo Alto and Franco's directorial adaptations of Pulitzer Prize-winning author Cormac McCarthy's Child of God and Nobel Prize-winning author William Faulkner's As I Lay Dying and The Sound and The Fury premiering at the 2014 Venice Film Festival.

Rabbit Bandini Productions has multiple projects in various stages of development. In production, In Dubious Battle, based on the Steinbeck book of the same name. The Adderall Diaries directed by Pamela Romanowsky, starring Franco, Ed Harris, Amber Heard, and Christian Slater.

Projects completed in 2015 include Justin Kelly's directorial adaptation of the biopic I Am Michael, with Franco, Zachary Quinto, and Emma Roberts, and Zeroville directed by Franco, starring Megan Fox, Seth Rogen, and Will Ferrell, along with Franco. The company teamed up with Seth Rogen and Evan Goldberg on The Disaster Artist, which is financed by Good Universe. In 2015, the company also produced "Actors Anonymous", a film funded by Sara Von Kienegger, in conjunction with students and the USC Film School.

== Filmography ==
=== Film ===
| Year | Title |
|---|---|
| TBA | Camp |
| TBA | Kill the Czar |
| TBA | The Long Home |
| TBA | Poster Cellar |
| 2019 | Zeroville |
| 2018 | Pretenders |
| 2018 | Future World |
| 2017 | I Think You're Totally Wrong |
| 2017 | The Disaster Artist |
| 2016 | Actors Anonymous |
| 2016 | King Cobra |
| 2016 | L.A. Series |
| 2015 | The Snow Men |
| 2015 | The Ultimate Evil |
| 2015 | The Adderall Diaries |
| 2015 | I Am Michael |
| 2015 | Yosemite |
| 2015 | Don Quixote: The Ingenious Gentleman of La Mancha |
| 2015 | A Walk in Winter |
| 2015 | Black Dog, Red Dog |
| 2015 | Holy Land |
| 2015 | In Dubious Battle |
| 2015 | Killing Animals |
| 2015 | Lockheed |
| 2015 | The Labyrinth |
| 2014 | Gucci Sunglasses |
| 2014 | Guests |
| 2014 | Memoria |
| 2013 | Bukowski |
| 2013 | Child of God |
| 2013 | Palo Alto |
| 2013 | As I Lay Dying |
| 2013 | The Director: An Evolution in Three Acts |
| 2013 | Interior. Leather Bar. |
| 2013 | Kink |
| 2013 | Acting Class |
| 2012 | The Color of Time |
| 2012 | Playhouse |
| 2012 | The Letter |
| 2012 | Spring Breakers |
| 2012 | The Iceman |
| 2012 | Maladies |
| 2012 | Hart Crane: An Exegesis |
| 2012 | Undergrads: South |
| 2012 | Melody Set Me Free |
| 2012 | Undergrads North |
| 2011 | Sal |
| 2010 | The Broken Tower |
| 2010 | Masculinity & Me |
| 2010 | The Clerk's Tale |
| 2010 | Shadows & Lies |
| 2010 | Saturday Night |
| 2010 | Herbert White |
| 2010 | Howl |
| 2010 | In Search of Ted Demme |
| 2009 | The Feast of Stephen |
| 2007 | Good Time Max |
| 2005 | Fool's Gold |
| 2005 | The Ape |

=== Television ===
| Year | Title |
|---|---|
| 2017–2019 | The Deuce |
