= Child of God (disambiguation) =

Child of God is a 1973 novel by Cormac McCarthy.

Child of God may also refer to:

- Child of God (film), a 2013 crime drama film
- Child of God (album), a 2024 studio album by Forrest Frank

== See also ==
- Child of God II, a 2025 studio album by Forrest Frank
- Children of God, a 2016 studio album by Phil Wickham
