= Studio 4 (disambiguation) =

Studio 4 was an acting and filmmaking school in New York and Los Angeles from 2014 to 2017.

Studio 4 may also refer to:

- Studio 4 in the Flagey Building, a large recording studio and concert hall in Brussels, Belgium
- Studio 4 (TV series), BBC drama series that aired in 1962
- Studio 4 Recording, a recording studio owned by Will Yip

== See also ==
- Off the Board: A Studio 4 Family Compilation, 2013 album by Balance and Composure
- Studio 4 Acoustic Session, album by Tigers Jaw
- Studio 4°C, Japanese anime studio
