= Studio 4 =

Defunct American acting school

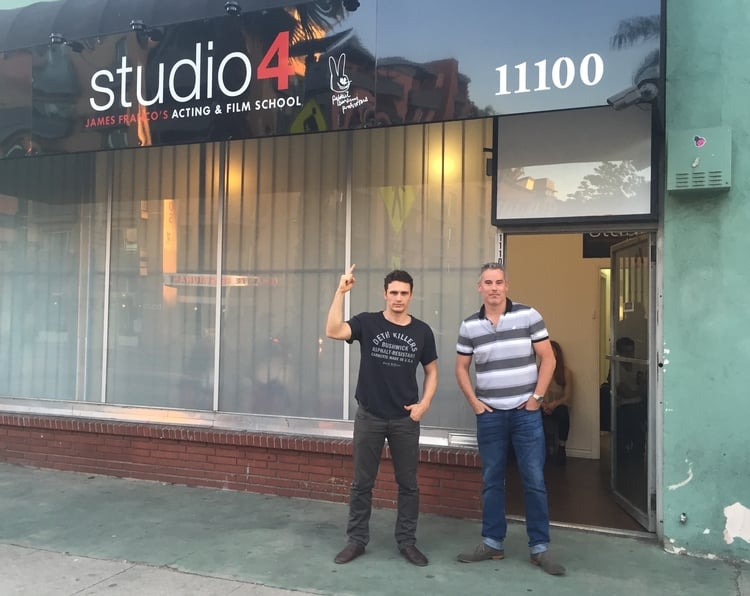
- James Franco and Vince Jolivette outside Studio 4 Los Angeles
- Type: Drama school
- Active: 2014–October 1, 2017
- Founders: James Franco
- Affiliations: Rabbit Bandini Productions
- Location: New York City and Los Angeles

Studio 4 was an acting and filmmaking school located in New York City and Los Angeles, founded by American actor James Franco in 2014. Franco opened the school after studying at Playhouse West in Los Angeles.

In 2017, multiple female students of the school came forward and stated that Franco had behaved in inappropriate or sexually exploitative ways while serving as their teacher.

The school was officially closed on October 1, 2017.

== History ==
Studio 4 claimed it was created to provide a place for students to be grounded in acting and focus on performance while not having to be tied up with additional school requirements. Franco claimed he wanted to emulate the creative environment he found at Playhouse West, in addition to providing opportunities through his production company, Rabbit Bandini Productions, that would otherwise not be available to acting, directing, or writing students.

The school offered a two-year Meisner technique conservatory study for actors and ongoing screenwriting and directing courses that were instructed by working industry professionals.

== Sexual misconduct allegations ==
In 2017, multiple female students of the school came forward and stated that Franco had behaved in inappropriate or sexually exploitative ways while serving as their teacher. One student stated that Franco "would always make everybody think there were possible roles on the table if we were to perform sexual acts or take off our shirts" in his projects. Another student stated that Franco held a sex scenes class and removed students' vaginal guards while simulating oral sex with them.

On October 3, 2019, two former female students of Studio 4 filed a lawsuit against Franco and his partners. According to The New York Times, the plaint alleges that the program "was little more than a scheme to provide him and his male collaborators with a pool of young female performers that they could take advantage of." The case claims that pupils were subjected to "sexually exploitative auditions and film shoots" and had to sign away their rights to the recordings.

On June 30, 2021, James Franco, Vince Jolivette, and Jay Davis agreed to settle a class-action lawsuit led by Sarah Tither-Kaplan and Toni Gaal, former students of Studio 4, for $2,235,000.

== Further accusations ==
In 2018, one of Studio 4's on-camera teachers and Franco's student at UCLA, Ryan Moody, accused Franco of underpaying him for his idea for The Disaster Artist. Moody filed a lawsuit against Franco's production company Rabbit Bandini Productions and Seth Rogen's production company Point Grey Pictures for only paying him $5,000 for his script. In 2019, the lawsuit was settled.
