= Pretenders (2018 film) =

2018 film directed by James Franco

- Theatrical release poster
- Directed by: James Franco
- Written by: Josh Boone
- Produced by: Jay Davis; Vince Jolivette; Katie Leary; Scott Levenson; Jordan Yale Levine; Shaun Sanghani; Ryan R. Johnson
- Starring: Jack Kilmer; Jane Levy; Shameik Moore; Juno Temple; Brian Cox; Dennis Quaid; James Franco
- Cinematography: Peter Zeitlinger
- Music by: Mark Kozelek
- Production companies: Rabbit Bandini Productions; SSS Entertainment; Yale Productions
- Distributed by: Cleopatra Entertainment
- Release dates: November 24, 2018 (Torino); September 27, 2019 (United States)
- Running time: 95 minutes
- Country: United States
- Language: English

Pretenders (Note: The most definitive title of the film appears per official poster is "Pretenders" while some sources in maintaining English language article status adds 'The'.) is a 2018 American drama film directed by James Franco from a screenplay by Josh Boone. It stars Jack Kilmer, Jane Levy, Shameik Moore, Juno Temple, Brian Cox, Dennis Quaid and Franco.

It had its world premiere at the Torino Film Festival on November 24, 2018. It was released on September 27, 2019, by Cleopatra Entertainment.

== Cast ==
- Jack Kilmer as Terry
- Jane Levy as Catherine
- Shameik Moore as Phil
- Juno Temple as Victoria
- Brian Cox as Henry
- Dennis Quaid as Joe
- James Franco as Maxwell
- Mustafa Shakir as Mr. Stanish
- Danielle Burgess as Madeline
- Jacqueline Honulik as Kim
- Antoni Porowski as Antoni
- Tyler Alvarez as Doug

== Production ==
In November 2016, it was announced James Franco would direct the film, from a screenplay by Josh Boone, with Franco, Jack Kilmer, Shameik Moore, Jane Levy, Brian Cox and Juno Temple joining the cast of the film. Vince Jolivette, Jay Davis, Shaun Sanghani, Jordan Yale Levine, Scott Levenson and Katie Leary served as producers on the film under their Rabbit Bandini Productions, SSS Entertainment and Yale Productions banners, respectively.

== Release ==
The film had its world premiere at the Torino Film Festival on November 24, 2018. Shortly after, Cleopatra Entertainment acquired distribution rights to the film, which they re-titled Pretenders. The first trailer was released in late August 2019, with a theatrical premier on October 4, 2019 and a VOD release on November 5, 2019, although some theaters began showing the film on September 27, 2019. It was released on DVD on November 12, 2019.

== Reception ==
On review aggregator Rotten Tomatoes, 20% of 10 reviews are positive, and the average rating is 4.3/10. On Metacritic — which assigns a weighted mean score — the film has a score of 14 out of 100 based on 5 critics, indicating "overwhelming dislike". While Variety's review praised "standout efforts from its three up-and-coming stars", the Los Angeles Times review called it "pretentious nonsense" and The New York Times said it "indulges in a distasteful brand of nostalgia".
