= Scott Smith (activist) =

American gay rights activist (1948–1995)

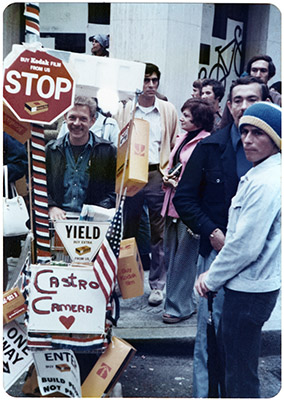
- Scott Smith pushing shopping cart with Castro Camera signs at Gay Freedom Day Parade, 1976
- Born: October 21, 1948; Key West, Florida, U.S.
- Died: February 4, 1995 (aged 46); San Francisco, California, U.S.
- Known for: Relationship with and campaign manager for Harvey Milk, LGBT rights activism

Joseph Scott Smith (October 21, 1948 — February 4, 1995) was a gay rights activist best known for his romantic relationship with Harvey Milk, for whom he was a campaign manager.

== Biography ==
Smith was born in Key West, Florida, and grew up in Jackson, Mississippi. He then attended Memphis State University for three years before moving to New York City in 1969, where he met Harvey Milk. Three years later, the two left New York City and moved to San Francisco, where the couple opened their own shop named Castro Camera. Harvey Milk and Scott Smith were in a romantic relationship for 7 years.

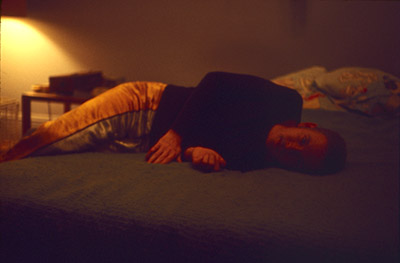
Scott Smith at 575 Castro Street photographed by Harvey Milk, 1973

Smith was instrumental to Milk's career as an activist and politician. He organized and managed Milk's campaigns for public office from 1974 to 1977 and his influence was widely in evidence after Milk was elected to the San Francisco Board of Supervisors in 1977. Smith was well known for orchestrating the Coors boycott and putting Milk at the forefront of the issue, creating one of the first public displays of power by the gay community. Milk was responsible for uniting gay establishments against Coors by refusing to sell Coors products.

There are hundreds of images of Smith, taken by Milk and others, in the Harvey Milk Archives/Scott Smith Collection at the San Francisco Public Library. After being discharged from the United States Navy, Milk spent many hours taking pictures. Smith was his favorite model; sometimes Milk spent entire rolls of film just taking pictures of Smith. Smith's friends and family nicknamed him "The Widow Milk" because of the dedication he had to archiving Harvey Milk's photos and belongings.

Smith fell into a very deep depression after Milk was killed. With Frank M. Robinson, he was the executor of Milk's last will and testament.

Smith died of pneumonia, resulting from HIV/AIDS, on February 4, 1995, at the age of 46. Family and friends of Smith wanted his life to be honored by donating to his favorite charities; the Salvation Army, San Francisco's AIDS Foundation and the Women's Cancer Resource Center in Oakland.

== Portrayal in popular culture ==
In the 2008 feature film Milk, the role of Smith was played by James Franco.
