= Matthew J. Blit =

American lawyer

- Born: March 9, 1975 (age 51); New York City, U.S.
- Education: South Shore High School; St. John's University (BA); St. John's University School of Law (JD)
- Occupation: Employment discrimination attorney

Matthew J. Blit (born March 9, 1975) is an American employment discrimination attorney best known for representing clients in high-profile matters involving celebrities and other notable parties. Blit also represented David Kuchinsky in his suit against New York Knicks center Eddy Curry; Ian Bernardo against American Idol; model Ashley Chontos in her sexual harassment suit against her former employer; and former actress and Binibining Pilipinas contestant Joanna "Dindi" Gallardo-Mills in her workplace-abuse suit against the companion of comic-book artist Frank Miller. In addition, Blit has represented a number of exotic dancers in sexual harassment and wage and hour claims against gentleman's clubs.

== Early life ==
Matthew J. Blit was born in Brooklyn, New York, was the elder of two sons, and grew up in the neighborhood of Mill Basin, where he attended South Shore High School. His father is a Cuban-American and his mother is of English and Romanian descent. Blit received his Bachelor of Arts degree from Saint John's University in 1997. In 2000, Blit graduated from St. John's University School of Law, earning the degree of Juris Doctor.

== Legal career ==
Blit accepted an associate attorney position with Wilson Elser Moskowitz Edelman & Dicker following his graduation from law school. He worked at the insurance defense giant until 2003, when he left to join the firm of David Scheinfeld & Associates. While there, Blit met his future partner, Leslie J. Levine. In 2004, the two left Scheinfeld & Associates to form Levine & Blit, PLLC.

Blit's practice focuses on employment litigation and personal injury claims. In addition to the above-listed matters, some of his noteworthy cases include a $4.5M jury verdict against the City of New York in a case involving the assault of a student and a $4.265M settlement for a child who fell out of a fifth-story window.

== Eddy Curry lawsuit ==
On January 12, 2009, Blit filed suit in the United States District Court for the Southern District of New York against Eddy Curry on behalf of David Kuchinsky, Curry's former chauffeur. In the complaint, Kuchinsky alleges "the basketball star made sexual advances at him, forced him to perform demeaning tasks and twice pointed a gun at him." The suit sought $68,000 in unpaid wages and $25,000 in expenses for which Kuchinsky was not reimbursed.
