= Sal (film) =

- Film poster
- Directed by: James Franco
- Screenplay by: Stacey Miller
- Story by: James Franco
- Produced by: James Franco; Vince Jolivette; Michael Lannan; Travis Mathews; Iris Torres
- Starring: Val Lauren; James Franco; Jim Parrack; Stacey Miller
- Cinematography: Christina Voros
- Music by: Neil Benezra
- Distributed by: Tribeca Film; Spotlight Pictures
- Release date: September 3, 2011 (Venice Film Festival)
- Running time: 85 minutes
- Country: United States
- Language: English

Sal is a 2011 biographical film depicting the last few hours of the life of Sal Mineo, one of the first major film actors in Hollywood to publicly acknowledge their own bisexuality or homosexuality. Mineo was murdered on February 12, 1976. The film, directed by James Franco, stars Val Lauren in the title role, and is based in part on Michael Gregg Michaud's book Sal Mineo: A Biography. The film also stars Jim Parrack, James Franco and Vince Jolivette in supporting roles.

Franco optioned the film in 2010, and shooting began during the summer of 2011. The film premiered at the 2011 Venice Film Festival and was set for theatrical release in November 2013.

== Cast ==
- Val Lauren as Sal Mineo
- Jim Parrack as Keir Dullea
- James Franco as Milton Katselas
- Vince Jolivette as Billy Belasco
- Trevor Neuhoff as Michael Mason
- Stacey Miller as Nancy Barr
- Brian Goodman as Det. Tankersley
- Raymond T. Williams as Lionel Ray Williams
- Boyd Smith as Boyd
- Jacquelyn Deme as Nurse
- Jason Fox as Steven Gustafson
- Brian Lally as Detective Pia
- Cristian Olave as Ray Evans
- Jocelyn Ayanna as Mabel
- Felicity Bryant as Monica Merrem
- Adrian De Leon as Reporter
- Tony Calle as Club Patron
- Richard Funston as Dead Sal
- Joseph Michael Harris as Palm Restaurant Patron (billed as Michael Harris)
- Stephen McCain as Spa Patron
- Raymond Merritt as Elderly Gentleman
- Inbal Amirav as Annabelle (billed as Annabelle Amirav)
- Ramiro Paré as Club patron
- Niko Pepaj as Spa Patron
- Daniel Rothbard as Palm Waiter
- Amy Sanders as Shocked Girl
- David Schlachtenhaufen as Club Patron
- Jordan Stone as Reporter
- Suwon Weaver as Palm Restaurant Patron
- Barrie Wild as Sauna User
- Cara Yurkowski as Journalist
- Kristen Adams as Set Designer
- Jonathan Darias as Palm Restaurant Patron
- Jack Davis as Gay Bar Dancer
- Leandro DiMonriva as Palm Restaurant Patron
- Jessica Starr Folger as Palm Restaurant Patron
- Ian Gray as Club Patron
- Thomas Harvey as Club Patron
- Matt Militano as Byron Stark (billed as Matthew Militano)
- Eva Pepaj as Mary-Ann (billed as Eva Lauren)
- Jae Rose as Palm Restaurant Patron
- Simon Stricker as Club Patron

== Reception ==
Sal has an approval rating of 50% on review aggregator website Rotten Tomatoes, based on 10 reviews, and an average rating of 4.1/10. Metacritic assigned the film a weighted average score of 41 out of 100, based on 8 critics, indicating "mixed or average reviews".
