= The Letter (2012 film) =

- Promotional poster
- Directed by: Jay Anania
- Written by: Jay Anania
- Produced by: Vince Jolivette; Marni Zelnick; Jeff Kalligheri
- Starring: Winona Ryder; James Franco
- Cinematography: Bradley Schmidt
- Music by: Arvo Pärt
- Production companies: Row 1 Productions; Rabbit Bandini Productions; Waterstone Entertainment
- Distributed by: Wrekin Hill Entertainment
- Release dates: September 9, 2012 (Cincinnati Film Festival); September 25, 2012 (DVD)
- Running time: 92 minutes
- Country: United States
- Language: English

The Letter, previously called The Stare, is a 2012 American psychological thriller film written and directed by Jay Anania, starring Winona Ryder and James Franco. Franco is a former student of Anania's, who teaches directing at NYU. The pair previously collaborated on Shadows and Lies. In 2012, it was announced that Lionsgate purchased the distribution rights to the film, which was retitled The Letter. The film got its first theatrical showing at the Cincinnati Film Festival on September 9, 2012.

== Plot ==
A playwright, Martine (Ryder), suffers from paranoia and hallucinations as she attempts to stage a new production. She is uncertain over whether she is deluded or if there is a plot against her. The ending is ambiguous as the viewers are left to deduce Martine's condition. Tyrone (Franco) is an actor in Martine's new play.

== Cast ==
- Winona Ryder as Martine
- James Franco as Tyrone
- Dagmara Dominczyk as Elizabeth Mcintyre
- Josh Hamilton as Raymond
- Katherine Waterston as Julie
- Marin Ireland as Anita

== Reception ==
In his review in Slant Magazine, Nick Schager said that "the film utilizes its familiar premise for little more than wannabe-profound aesthetic masturbation, leaving its cast to vainly attempt to energize scenarios without purpose."

Writing for 7MPictures, Liam Carr said that "The Letter is not a thriller. It is barely a film. It's a boring, self-important, disjointed and pointless pile of tripe masquerading as a movie."
