= Castro's Daughter =

Upcoming biographical film

- Directed by: Miguel Bardem
- Screenplay by: Jose Rivera; Nilo Cruz (Note: Cruz is credited as writer twice; both by himself and as part of a team with Moresco.); Robert Moresco
- Story by: Robert Moresco; Nilo Cruz
- Based on: Alina: Memorias de la hija rebelde de Fidel Castro by Alina Fernandez
- Produced by: Nilo Cruz
- Starring: James Franco
- Music by: Carlos Jose Alvarez
- Production company: Mankind Films
- Countries: United States; Colombia
- Language: English

Castro's Daughter is an upcoming biographical drama film about Alina Fernandez, the illegitimate daughter of Cuban revolutionary Fidel Castro. It was directed by Miguel Bardem and written by Jose Rivera, Nilo Cruz and Robert Moresco, based on Fernandez's 1997 memoir Alina: Memorias de la hija rebelde de Fidel Castro. James Franco stars as Castro. Other cast members include Ana Villafañe as Fernandez, Mia Maestro, María Cecilia Botero, Alana de la Rosa, Charlotte de Casabianca, and Rafael Ernesto Hernandez.

== Premise ==
The film tells the history of Alina Fernandez, the illegitimate daughter of Cuban revolutionary Fidel Castro, and her hard years living in the shadow of her father.

== Cast ==
- James Franco as Fidel Castro
- Ana Villafañe as Alina Fernández
  - Kenzie Collazo as Young Alina
- Mia Maestro as Natalia Revuelta
- Alana de la Rosa
- María Cecilia Botero
- Rafael Ernesto Hernandez as Raul Castro
- Charlotte de Casabianca as Mari Paz

== Production ==
The film was in development in early 2007. Actors linked to this production included, Brooke Shields Daniel Bruhl, Paz Vega, Jordi Molla and Mia Maestro. In 2020 the project resurfaced. In 2022, James Franco came on as lead.

Filming began in August 2022 in Bogotá, Colombia.

== Controversy ==
The casting of James Franco as Fidel Castro generated controversy from figures like Jessica Darrow and Ana Navarro after John Leguizamo criticized it stating in an Instagram post "I don't got a prob with Franco but he ain't Latino!". In response, producer John Martinez O’Felan said Leguizamo's comments "are culturally uneducated and a blind attack with zero substance related to this project."
