= The Ape (2005 film) =

- Film poster
- Directed by: James Franco
- Written by: James Franco; Merriwether Williams
- Produced by: Vince Joviette; Stephen Kayo; David Klein; Zak Knutson
- Starring: James Franco; Brian Lally
- Cinematography: David Klein
- Edited by: Scott Mosier
- Music by: Erich Stratmann
- Production company: Rabbit Bandini Productions
- Distributed by: TLA Releasing
- Release date: June 16, 2005
- Running time: 92 minutes
- Country: United States
- Language: English

The Ape is a 2005 American comedy film written, starring, executive produced, and directed by James Franco in his directorial debut.

== Plot ==
Human resources drone and put-upon family man Harry imagines he could be the next Dostoyevsky if he could just get a little peace and quiet. When he moves out of his family home and into his own apartment to craft his masterpiece, his solitude is broken by an unexpected roommate, a foul-mouthed, Hawaiian shirt-wearing Gorilla.

The ape harasses Harry constantly, sharing his opinions on life, love and animal magnetism. He inspires Harry to embrace his own most carnal and base impulses. This leads to trouble at the office where Harry embarks on an ill-advised affair with his high-strung boss and makes questionable decisions during a big presentation. Back at their apartment, Harry and the ape grow closer, but it's not clear that their relationship is helping Harry's writing. His short story is rejected by the New Yorker magazine, and Harry finds himself increasingly cut off from the world outside. When he attacks the ape for ruining his life, the ape strangles him to death.

== Cast ==
- James Franco as Harry Walker
- Brian Lally as The Ape
- Allison Bibicoff as Cathy
- Stacey Miller as Beth
- Vince Jolivette as Steve
- Nori Jill Phillips as Judy
- Danny Molina as Raoul
- David Markey as Flies With Eagles

== Release ==
The film was released in the United States on June 18, 2005.

== Critical response ==
Variety called the film "self-indulgent."

== See also ==
- 2005 in film
