= Camille (2008 film) =

- Poster
- Directed by: Gregory Mackenzie
- Written by: Nick Pustay
- Produced by: Albert S. Ruddy; Daniel Grodnik; Steve Markoff; Bruce McNall; Gregory Mackenzie; Brett Walsh; Alana Ribble
- Starring: James Franco; Sienna Miller; David Carradine
- Cinematography: Sharone Meir
- Edited by: Roger Bondelli
- Music by: Mark Mancina
- Production companies: A-Mark Entertainment; Ruddy Morgan Productions
- Distributed by: National Entertainment Media
- Release dates: April 11, 2008 (First Take Film Festival); November 14, 2008 (United States)
- Country: United States
- Language: English

Camille is a 2008 American black comedy film directed by Gregory Mackenzie and starring James Franco and Sienna Miller. The film concerns two ill-matched newlyweds Silas Parker (Franco) and Camille Foster (Miller) and their honeymoon trip to Niagara Falls. After Camille is killed in a motorcycle accident early in the film, she continues to behave as though alive and the remorseful Silas develops loving feelings for her.

== Plot ==
The plot follows the two characters who have recently married and are going to Niagara Falls on their honeymoon. Silas Parker is a thief who marries Camille Foster, his parole officer's niece, seeing it as his chance to escape to Canada. Silas cannot stand Camille and she is blind to how he really feels, believing that everything will be all right once they get to the falls. After their wedding Camille frets that no rice was thrown, seeing it as bad luck.

On the way to Niagara Falls they crash their honeymoon bike and Camille dies in the accident. Thinking that he killed her, Silas runs away and breaks into a nearby house to call the police, but hangs up abruptly. When he returns to the accident site he finds Camille up and washing in a nearby river. Over the course of the trip Silas realizes that Camille really did die in the accident as she starts to decay. While taking care of her, Silas shows a kinder side through his guilt over having accidentally caused her death.

Meanwhile, the police believe that Silas actually killed his wife and begin to hunt him down. The couple evades capture several times and end up traveling with an old rodeo cowboy with colored horses. One horse, Maggie, is old and should have died years ago but is still sticking around for some reason. As Camille physically deteriorates she and Silas grow closer, eventually dancing and kissing in the rain. Silas says that while he never believed in anything, Camille believed in him when no one else ever had.

The couple travel with the cowboy until he has a breakdown and frees all his horses. Seeing that Maggie will not leave his side even at gunpoint, the cowboy mounts the horse and they ride into the dawn.

The couple finally reach Niagara Falls and take the boat tour together. As Silas smiles down on Camille, happy to be with her, she tells him that she is ready now. He turns to ask someone to take their picture, and when he turns back she has vanished. He gets off the boat and heads towards the Canada–US border, but stops and goes back looking for Camille. The police then spot him and chase him to the edge of the Niagara Falls viewing point. Not believing that Camille is truly gone, he screams for her, and the police, thinking he is still evading arrest, shoot him. Camille suddenly appears, riding toward him on Maggie, and asks why he didn't go on without her, and he says he couldn't. He mounts up behind her and says "I love you" for the first time. They kiss and then turn toward the falls. Camille says "I had a great honeymoon" and Silas answers "Me too."

Then Maggie gallops forward and jumps over the edge into the Niagara Falls with Camille and Silas on her back, all three disappearing into the mist. After they jump, rice starts to fall from the sky.

== Cast ==
- James Franco as Silas Parker
- Sienna Miller as Camille Foster
- David Carradine as Bob "Cowboy Bob"
- Scott Glenn as Sheriff Foster
- Ed Lauter as Sheriff Steiner
- Mark Wilson as Deputy Ruddy

== Release ==
The film played at film festivals in Europe and North America throughout 2008. Camille had a United States theatrical release on November 14, 2008, followed by an international theatrical release including Russia, Mexico, and the UAE.

== Reception ==
Dustin Sommer of Blu-ray Review wrote "If you're in the mood for something out of the ordinary, Camille is a sure bet." Chuck Bowen of Slant Magazine rated it 2.5/5 stars and wrote, "An admirable Sienna Miller effort isn't enough to save this strange, plasti-quirky mess." Brian Orndorf of DVD Talk called it a black comedy that is "complete absurdity". Louise Keller of Urban Cinefile wrote "A surprisingly touching black comedy with a twist."
