= Child of God =

1973 novel by Cormac McCarthy

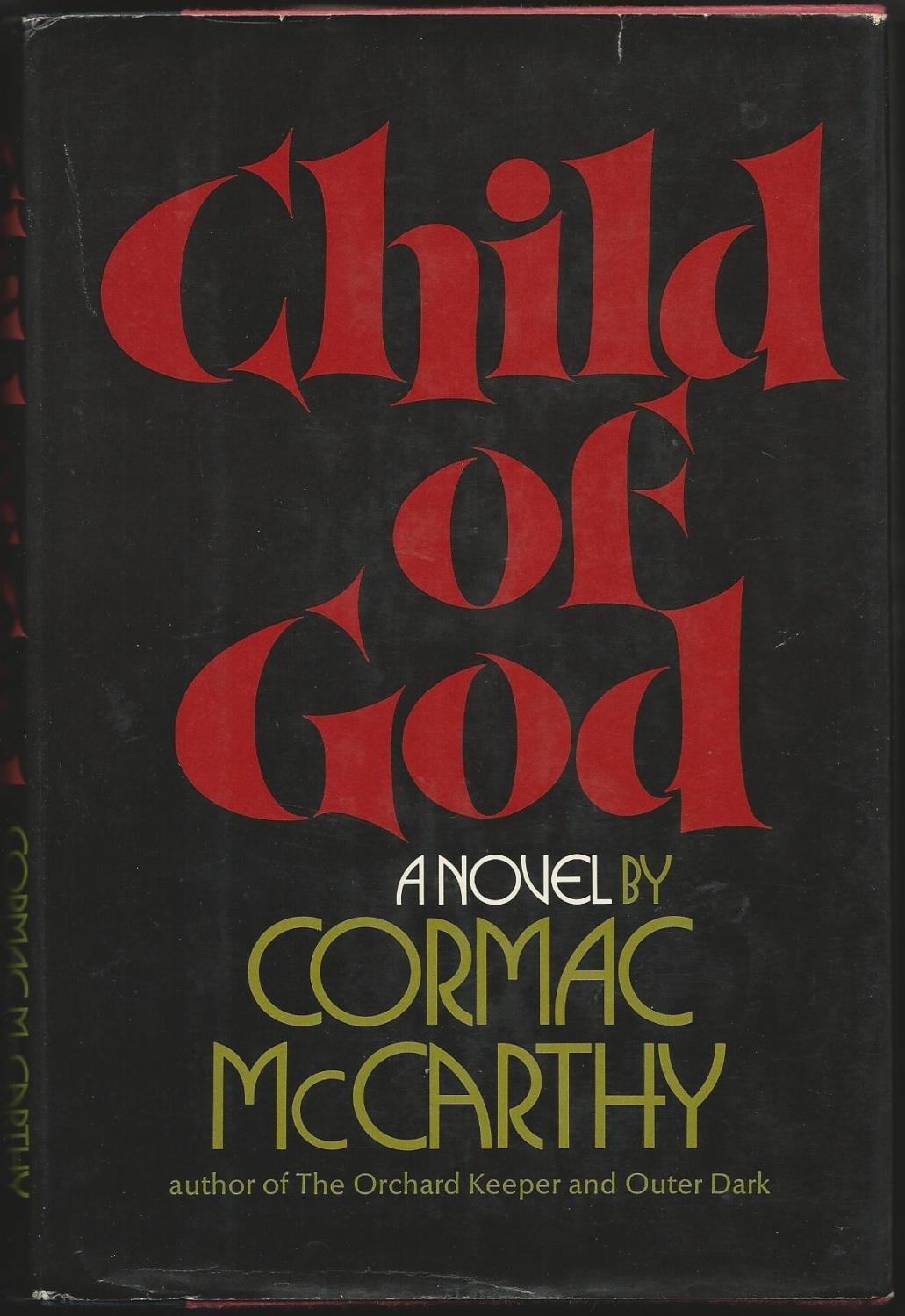
- First edition cover
- Author: Cormac McCarthy
- Language: English
- Genre: Gothic
- Publisher: Random House
- Publication date: 1973
- Publication place: United States
- Media type: Print (hardback & paperback)
- Pages: 197 (paperback)
- Preceded by: Outer Dark
- Followed by: Suttree

Child of God (1973) is the third novel by American author Cormac McCarthy. It depicts the life of a violent outcast and serial killer in 1960s Appalachian Tennessee.

Though the novel received critical praise, it was not a financial success. Like its predecessor Outer Dark (1968), Child of God established McCarthy's interest in using extreme isolation, perversity, and violence to represent human experience. McCarthy ignores literary conventions – for example, he does not use quotation marks for dialogue – and switches between several styles of writing such as matter-of-fact descriptions, extremely detailed prose, vivid and picturesque pastoral imagery, and colloquial first-person narration (with the speaker remaining unidentified).

== Plot summary ==
Set in mountainous Sevier County, Tennessee, in the 1960s, Child of God tells the story of Lester Ballard, a dispossessed, violent man whom the narrator describes as "a child of God much like yourself perhaps". Ballard is violently evicted from his home, which is sold at auction to another Sevier County resident, John Greer. Now homeless, Ballard begins squatting in an abandoned two-room cabin and voyeuristically spying on young couples in their cars near the Frog Mountain turnaround. Ballard is falsely accused of rape by a woman he finds sleeping along the roadside, and is jailed for nine days. Interspersed among the narrator's story are townspeople's accounts of Ballard's early life, revealing his early violent behavior and the suicide of his father.

While out squirrel hunting, Ballard comes across a dead couple in an idling car. He steals the couple's money, rapes the woman's corpse, and stores her body in the attic of his cabin. Ballard's cabin burns down with the corpse inside, and he moves his remaining possessions into a nearby cave. Ballard visits his friend's home, finding only the friend's daughter and a disabled child. When the daughter rejects his sexual advances, he kills her and sets the house ablaze, storing her body in the cave. Later, Ballard shoots a couple in their car. As he flees the scene with the woman's corpse, he sees that the man survived and drove away. Prompted by the string of murders, the county sheriff begins investigating Ballard. The county floods, and the sheriff recalls the county's history of vigilantism with the Whitecaps and Blue Bills.

Ballard unsuccessfully attempts to kill John Greer, the current owner of his former home, and is shot in the process. He wakes handcuffed to a guarded hospital bed, missing an arm. One night, a group of men appear in his hospital room demanding to know where he stored his victims' bodies. Ballard initially feigns innocence, but offers to lead the men to the bodies when they threaten to hang him. Ballard brings them to the cave, where he escapes through a crevice too small for the other men to fit through. For three days, Ballard deliriously roams the cave searching for an exit. He eventually chips through a small crack to the surface and returns himself to the hospital.

Instead of facing trial, Ballard is sent to a mental hospital where he contracts pneumonia and dies soon after. His remains are dissected by medical students in Memphis for three months before he is buried. In the spring of the same year, a farmer's plow falls into a sinkhole in Sevier County, revealing a cavernous chamber containing the bodies of seven of Ballard's victims.

== Themes ==
Overarching themes of the novel are cruelty, isolation, and moral degradation of humans and the role of fate and society in it. In an interview with James Franco, director of the novel's movie adaptation, McCarthy remarked that "there are people like him [Ballard] all around us". One of the novel's main themes is sexual deviancy, specifically necrophilia. Ballard, who the novel makes clear is unable to have conventional romantic relationships, eventually descends into necrophilia after finding a dead couple in a car. After this "first love" is destroyed in a fire, he becomes proactive, creating dead female partners by shooting them with his rifle. Ballard also makes no distinction between adult women and young girls, at one point killing a girl whom he had previously asked "How come you wear them britches? You cain't see nothin." Another theme examined by the novel is survival. As society pushes Ballard further and further into a corner, he degenerates into a barbaric survivalist, living in a cave, stealing food, and deviously escaping after he is captured by a group of vengeful men. Much like McCarthy's later novel Blood Meridian, the novel explores the nature of cruelty, depicting violence as an eternal driving force of humanity:

He came up flailing and sputtering and began to thrash his way toward the line of willows that marked the submerged creek bank. He could not swim, but how would you drown him? His wrath seemed to buoy him up. Some halt in the way of things seems to work here. See him. You could say that he's sustained by his fellow men, like you. Has peopled the shore with them calling to him. A race that gives suck to the maimed and the crazed, that wants their wrong blood in its history and will have it. But they want this man's life. He has heard them in the night seeking him with lanterns and cries of execration. How then is he borne up? Or rather, why will not these waters take him?

This passage bears a striking resemblance to the closing pages of Blood Meridian, wherein Judge Holden declares that war is beautiful, comparing it to dance. That novel's main text ends with the judge in the center of a barroom, rallying the raucous men around him with a performance: "He dances in light and in shadow and he is a great favorite. He never sleeps, the judge. He is dancing, dancing. He says that he will never die."

== Historical references ==
In a 1992 interview, McCarthy stated that the character Ballard was based on an unnamed historic figure. Despite its surreal focus, Child of God contains much unobtrusive historical detail about Sevier County, Tennessee, including references to local Ku Klux Klan-like vigilante groups of the 1890s known as White Caps and Bluebills. Ballard's grandfather is said to have been a White Cap.

== Texas book report controversy ==
In October 2007, Child of God found itself at the center of a teaching controversy at Jim Ned High School in Tuscola, Texas. Kaleb Tierce, the Advanced Placement English teacher and coach at Jim Ned, assigned a book report for which a 14-year-old student selected this title. Tierce was placed on paid administrative leave when the mother of the student complained. The case was investigated, but Tierce was not charged. He was later indicted for requesting sexual favors from students, and his teaching contract was not renewed.

== Film adaptation ==
In February 2012, James Franco began shooting a film adaptation of Child of God in Hillsboro, West Virginia. The film stars Scott Haze as Lester Ballard and Jim Parrack as the Sevier County lawman Deputy Cotton. The movie was selected to be screened in the official competition at the 70th Venice International Film Festival and was an official selection of the 2013 Toronto International Film Festival. The film received mixed to negative reviews, holding a rating of 42% on review aggregator Rotten Tomatoes, with an average score of 4.90/10. The website's critical consensus states: "An obviously reverent adaptation that fails to make a case for the source material being turned into a movie, Child of God finds director James Franco outmatched by Cormac McCarthy's novel."
