= Good Time Max =

- Film poster
- Directed by: James Franco
- Written by: Merriwether Williams; James Franco
- Produced by: Vince Jolivette; Cynthia Huffman; Dough Chamberlain; Zak Knutson; Peter Manoogian; Annie Oelschlager
- Starring: James Franco; Vince Jolivette; Wilmer Calderon
- Cinematography: David Klein
- Edited by: Sven Pape; Dave Rock
- Music by: Jonathan Sadoff
- Production company: Rabbit Bandini Productions
- Distributed by: IFC Films
- Release date: April 30, 2007 (Tribeca)
- Running time: 78 minutes
- Country: United States
- Language: English

Good Time Max is a 2007 drama film directed by James Franco, who also co-wrote and co-stars in the film. It premiered at the 6th Annual Tribeca Film Festival.

== Plot ==
Two genius brothers take different paths in life, with one becoming a surgeon and the other becoming a drug addict.

== Cast ==
- James Franco as Max
- Vince Jolivette as Bruce
- Wilmer Calderon as T-Ray
- Trip Hope as Skeet
- Richard Portnow as Head Administrator
- Jarrod Bunch as Doug
- Robyn Cohen as Jo
- Peter Mackenzie as Anesthesiologist
- Brian Lally as Lt. Lally / Philosophical Biker
- Charity Shea as Big Guy's Girl
- Molly Cheek as Carol
- Mary Payne as Teacher
- Mark Hapka as Mark
- Bailey Hughes as Young Max
- Tylor Chase as Young Adam
- Matt Bell as Adam
- David Garrett as Intern Cohen
- Jack Samet as Rabbi

== Production ==
Filming took place in Agua Dulce, Los Angeles, and South Pasadena, California, as well as New York City.
