= Saturday Night (2010 film) =

2010 film by James Franco

- Film poster
- Directed by: James Franco
- Starring: John Malkovich; Lorne Michaels; Bill Hader; John Mulaney; Fred Armisen; Will Forte; Seth Meyers; Casey Wilson; Bobby Moynihan; Steve Higgins
- Cinematography: Pedro Gómez Millán; Christina Voros; Sergie Krasikau; Aileen Taylor
- Edited by: Ian Olds
- Production company: Rabbit Bandini Productions
- Release dates: March 14, 2010 (SXSW Film Festival); September 26, 2014 (United States)
- Running time: 95 minutes
- Country: United States
- Language: English

Saturday Night is a 2010 documentary film directed by James Franco. The film examines the production process of the NBC late-night live television sketch comedy series Saturday Night Live. Shot over a period of six days from December 1–6, 2008, the film was originally a school assignment for Franco at New York University.

The film premiered at the 2010 South by Southwest Film Festival on March 14, 2010, and then was shelved for several years due to legal matters regarding its distributor and NBC. It was released on September 26, 2014 on Hulu.

== Cast ==
- John Malkovich
- James Franco
- Lorne Michaels
- Bill Hader
- John Mulaney
- Fred Armisen
- Seth Meyers
- Kenan Thompson
- Bobby Moynihan
- Will Forte
- Casey Wilson
- Andy Samberg
- Darrell Hammond
- Steve Higgins
- Amy Poehler
- Kristen Wiig
- Simon Rich
- T.I.
- Michaela Watkins
- Don Roy King
- Jason Sudeikis

== Summary ==
The film begins at the Monday morning pitch meeting, in which writers submit jokes. By Tuesday, writers are staying up all night to complete their sketches for the following day's table read. Fifty sketches are submitted, and only nine are broadcast. The film follows the construction of sets, rehearsals, and the eventual live show.

== Production ==
Rarely do you really get to see much of the actual process. And so I thought, if we get that, if we get to do that, then we'll have something that's: (A) new, and also, (B) I think really valuable, for anybody who's interested in comedy, or writing, or who is interested in the way certain kinds of television work.

— James Franco in 2014

The film was developed from a film class assignment assigned to Franco while he was attending New York University's Tisch School of the Arts in 2008. Having recently hosted Saturday Night Live, he chose cast member Bill Hader as the subject of his observational documentary. He first had to gain the approval of SNL creator and executive producer Lorne Michaels, as well as host John Malkovich. In doing so, he decided to shoot more footage and create a feature-length documentary on the show's production process.

After completion, much of the show's cast had to "sign off" on the picture, and gaining significant approval was no problem until Franco sought the permission of NBC. During this period, there were many executive changes at the network, which made it difficult to secure approval. The film was bought by Oscilloscope Films sometime later, who intended to distribute it theatrically. The studio's founder, Adam Yauch, died in 2012, complicating matters.

The film was uploaded to Hulu on September 26, 2014, in celebration of the fortieth anniversary of SNL.

== Reception ==
Upon its debut at SXSW, the film attracted positive reviews. IndieWire's Eric Kohn opined that the film's "attempt(s) to obtain a deeper truth gives [it] a greater sense of candor than your average fluff piece," summarizing, "Franco's portrait emerges against all odds as a compelling look at anachronistic media in action." Karina Longworth of LA Weekly felt it "fascinating and absolutely worth seeing," though not flattering to the cast members/writers portrayed. Dave Itzkoff of The New York Times deemed it a "fairly straightforward" look behind the scenes of the show, while noting, "the film turns up a number of details and tidbits that are like manna to comedy nerds." In 2014, after its wide release on Hulu, The Wall Street Journal's Mike Ayers wrote that "For anyone interested in comedy and the creative process, it's essential viewing."
