= James Dean (2001 film) =

2001 television film by Mark Rydell

- Promotional poster
- Genre: Biographical; Drama
- Written by: Israel Horovitz
- Directed by: Mark Rydell
- Starring: James Franco; Michael Moriarty; Valentina Cervi; Enrico Colantoni; Edward Herrmann
- Theme music composer: John Frizzell
- Country of origin: United States
- Original language: English

Production
- Executive producers: Bill Gerber; Mark Rydell
- Producer: George W. Perkins
- Cinematography: Robbie Greenberg
- Editor: Antony Gibbs
- Running time: 96 minutes
- Production companies: Five Mile River Films; Gerber Pictures; Marvin Worth Productions; Splendid Television

Original release
- Network: TNT
- Release: August 5, 2001

James Dean is a 2001 American made-for-television biographical drama film based on the life of the American actor James Dean. James Franco plays the title role under the direction of Mark Rydell, who chronicles Dean's rise from a struggling actor to an A-list movie star in 1950s Hollywood. The film's supporting roles included Michael Moriarty, Valentina Cervi, Enrico Colantoni, and Edward Herrmann.

The biopic began development at Warner Bros. in the early 1990s. At one point, Michael Mann was contracted to direct with Leonardo DiCaprio starring in the lead role. After Mann's departure, Des McAnuff, Dennis Hopper, and Milčo Mančevski were considered for the director's chair. Rydell was hired as director in 1996, but the film continued to languish in development hell.

Warner Bros. then decided to produce James Dean as a TV movie for Turner Network Television (TNT); both Warner Bros. and TNT were owned by Time Warner. Franco was cast as Dean in May 2000 after a search that resulted in 500 auditions. Franco researched his role to closely portray Dean. James Dean was shown on TNT in the United States on August 5, 2001, receiving generally positive reviews from critics and widespread acclaim for Franco's performance.

== Plot ==
At eight years old, James Dean lives with his estranged father Winton and mother Mildred in 1939 Santa Monica, California. When Mildred dies of cancer in 1940, Winton sends James on a train to Fairmount, Indiana, along with the coffin containing her body. Winton does not show up at the funeral, leaving James to be raised by his aunt and uncle on a farm in Fairmount. Over the years, he becomes more curious about his father's decision to abandon him. He tries to impress him by sending him a package displaying his various athletic trophies in high school sports.

James moves back to Santa Monica in June 1949, shortly after high school graduation, and finds that Winton has remarried. He decides to become an actor and takes classes under James Whitmore. Whitmore is impressed by his acting ability, which encourages him to move to New York City in September 1951 to pursue an acting career. Despite being a struggling actor, he enjoys the new lifestyle. He befriends fellow actor Martin Landau and has a romantic relationship with Christine White. Both are accepted into the prestigious Actors Studio. He receives critical acclaim in Broadway theatre productions and for a role in a television movie drama that is broadcast nationwide. He tries to tell Winton about his successful rise in acting, but his father still reacts with indifference, causing more emotional turmoil for him.

Film producer-director Elia Kazan hires James for the leading role in East of Eden (1955), marking his Hollywood debut. He moves to Hollywood in April 1954 to begin filming for Eden and is introduced to Jack L. Warner, the stern president of Warner Bros. Studios who is determined to transform him into a movie star. Warner becomes suspicious of his personal life (such as his possible bisexuality and passions for auto racing and motorcycling). On the Warner Bros. backlot, he falls in love with actress Pier Angeli, who is working on the neighboring production of The Silver Chalice (1954).

Despite concerns from Pier's domineering mother, James and his girlfriend buy a beach house in which they live together. Meanwhile, eccentric director Nicholas Ray casts him in the lead role for Rebel Without a Cause (1955). He once again hopes to impress his father with his rising movie star career in Hollywood, but Winton persists with his indifference. When East of Eden debuts, Warner is furious that he does not show up at the premiere. He considers shutting down production of Rebel Without a Cause, but he drops the idea due to James's praised performance in Eden. Later, he finds out that Warner sided with Pier's mother over his break up with her. She ends up marrying Vic Damone, while James then signs a one million dollar contract with Warner Bros. and is cast in Giant (1956). His mental breakdowns become more apparent when he starts conflicting with director George Stevens.

Angered with his life, James decides to learn the truth about his father's disinterest toward him since he was eight years old. Winton tells him that his real father was a man with whom his mother had an affair during the marriage and that he did not have the courage to raise him, not being his real father. With his inner demons resolved, he begins to enjoy life once more and adopts a friendly relationship with director Stevens. Shortly afterward, he dies in a car crash that shocks the film industry and the general public. En route on a train to Indiana, Winton sits next to his coffin in the storage room, he would not leave him this time.

== Cast ==
- James Franco as James Dean: A movie star who has emotional struggles with his father, Hollywood policies, acting, and romantic relationships.
  - Kyle Chambers portrays young James Dean
- Michael Moriarty as Winton "Winnie" Dean: James' father who abandons him at a young age.
- Valentina Cervi as Pier Angeli: Italian actress who James first meets on the Warner Bros. backlot. Under pressure from her domineering mother, Pier breaks off her relationship with James and marries Vic Damone.
- Enrico Colantoni as Elia Kazan: Acclaimed Hollywood film director. Kazan casts James in East of Eden, using unconventional directing techniques that land James critical praise.
- Amy Rydell as Christine White: James' girlfriend in New York. The two successfully audition their way into the Actors Studio.
- Director Mark Rydell as Jack L. Warner: President of Warner Bros. Pictures. who signs James under contract. Mr. Warner acts as a strict father figure to James' Hollywood lifestyle.
- Samuel Gould as Martin Landau: Actor who befriends James in New York.
- Wendy Benson as Julie Harris: East of Eden actress who expresses sympathy for James' break-up with Pier.
- David Parker as James Whitmore: James' acting teacher in Los Angeles.
- Lisa Robins as Mildred Dean: James' mother. Mildred dies of cancer when her son is just a child.
- Karen Kondazian as Mrs. Pierangeli: Pier's strict religious mother who convinces her daughter to marry Vic Damone.
- Barry Primus as Nicholas Ray: Eccentric director of Rebel Without a Cause who avoids pressure to cast Marlon Brando in the lead role.
- Peggy McCay as Emma Dean: James Dean's grandma.
- Edward Herrmann as Raymond Massey: Distinguished actor who portrays Dean's screen father on East of Eden. Massey is dubious over James' method acting.
- Craig Barnett as George Stevens: Director of Giant who, at first, has trouble accommodating James' emotional and movie star status.
- Joanne Linville as Hedda Hopper: Hollywood gossip columnist who praises James' acting abilities in East of Eden.
- Andrew Prine as Rogers Brackett: Homosexual New York theater director who meets James and Martin Landau (then struggling actors) in a diner.
- Lisa Blake Richards as Ethel Dean: Winton's wife after the death of Mildred. She is not satisfied over her husband's fathering of James.
- Holly Beavon as Marilyn Monroe (uncredited)
- Elizabeth Karsell as Judy Garland (uncredited)
- Eric Brenner as Julie Harris' Date (uncredited)

== Production ==
=== Development and writing ===
In the early 1990s, Warner Bros. planned to produce a feature biographical film about actor James Dean, and the studio hired Israel Horovitz to write the script. One of the working titles was James Dean: An Invented Life before it was finalized as James Dean. When Horovitz wrote the script, he explored the "psychological insight" of Dean by showcasing the abandonment of his father, which became the fulcrum of the storyline. Horovitz recalled, "Why would a father ship his wife's body back on a train with an 8-year-old son, never go to the funeral and never pick the son up again, never bring the son back out to him?" The screenwriter felt it was best to portray Dean's purported homosexuality by innuendo rather than explicitly. He wanted to focus on the romance between Dean and Pier Angeli and Dean's growth as an actor, and believed that a homosexuality subplot would distract from the storyline. Producer Marvin Worth explained in July 1995, "We'll try to make a good movie... not one of rumor and innuendo."

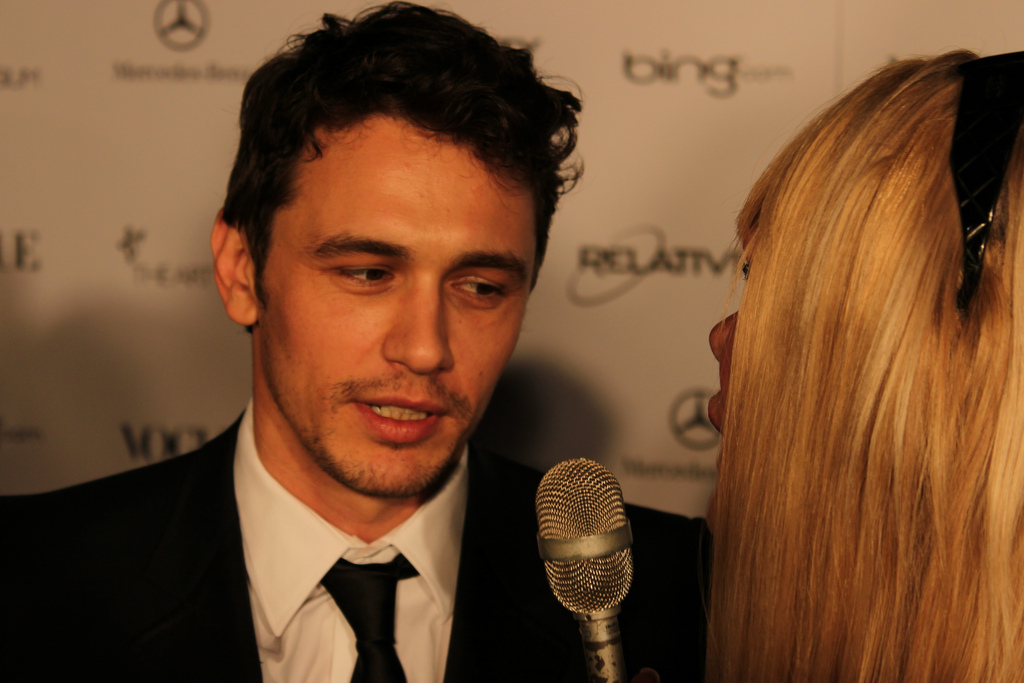
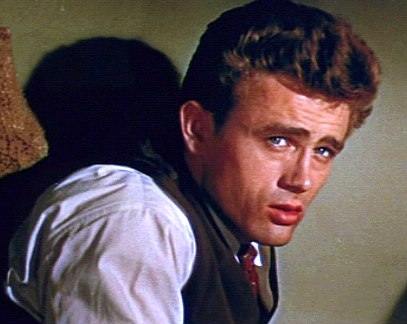
Director Mark Rydell acknowledged an uncanny resemblance between Franco (left) and Dean.

Michael Mann was contracted to direct James Dean in September 1993, and filming was scheduled to start in May 1994. Johnny Depp and Brad Pitt were under serious consideration for the lead role, while both actors were also attached to the part. Mann approached Leonardo DiCaprio for the role of James Dean, feeling that DiCaprio was the best candidate. Gary Oldman was also discussed for a supporting role. In March 1994, Mann decided not to direct James Dean due to scheduling conflicts with Heat (1995). Mann also thought that DiCaprio was too young at 19-years-old and wanted to wait another year to have DiCaprio mature into the role. “From one angle, he totally had it with him,” Mann said of DiCaprio's filmed audition. “I mean, it’s brilliance. He would turn his face in one direction and we see a vision of James Dean, and then he’d turn his face another direction and it’s no, that’s a young kid. I found the absolutely perfect act of the play, in about three years from that. He respectfully undid the James Dean bio for me.”

Des McAnuff replaced Mann as director, and filming was rescheduled to December 1994. Screenwriter Horovitz was busy playwrighting in Europe, so McAnuff and producer Marvin Worth were constantly rewriting the script in July 1994. The budget was estimated at $20 million. McAnuff stepped down as director and was replaced by Dennis Hopper. Hopper was a close friend with Dean and co-starred with the actor in both Rebel Without a Cause and Giant. Hopper met with DiCaprio for the lead role, but the director eventually dropped out of the film. By May 1995, DiCaprio was still the top candidate to portray Dean with Milčo Mančevski in discussions to direct the film.

After negotiations with Mančevski fell through, Mark Rydell was contracted to direct the biopic in February 1996. Rydell was also close friends with Dean; the two studied together at Actors Studio in Manhattan, New York during the early 1950s. DiCaprio dropped out of the lead role entirely when his asking price was determined to be too high after the actor's success with Romeo + Juliet (1996) and Titanic (1997). Meanwhile, Rydell worked with Horovitz on another rewrite, and Warner Bros. planned to fast track production. Don Was was hired to write and compose the film score, but he was later replaced by John Frizzell. Shortly after Rydell's hiring, Stephen Dorff entered discussions to portray James Dean. Ethan Hawke would later turn down the role.

With the film languishing in development hell, producer Bill Gerber from Warner Bros. decided James Dean would work best as a television movie for Turner Network Television (TNT); both Warners and TNT are owned by Time Warner. Gerber explained the format choice, "It was just hard to find bankable names that the studio would finance a $20 million movie with. And there were marketing problems. He died in a highway accident in 1955 so almost everyone would know the outcome of the movie. James Dean also isn't that well known by the general movie-going public these days." Actor James Franco was cast into the lead role, and principal photography for James Dean started in June 2000. Filming took place around the Los Angeles area and at the Sony Pictures Studios in Culver City.

=== Casting ===
It was interesting because everyone I spoke to had a different perspective on James Dean. I think it is because he compartmentalized his friends so distinctly that everyone saw a different side of him. I often found that if people did not have that much personal information about James Dean, the experiences they had with him were mystical.
— James Franco on his research for James Dean

Rydell and other filmmakers started a casting call in late March 2000 to find the most suitable actor for the lead role. The call encompassed New York, Los Angeles, Toronto, Vancouver, Atlanta, Chicago and the Midwestern United States. Casting director Nancy Foy commented that the search included "everyone from highly-trained, experienced actors in their early and mid-20s, to people who had no training and had sent in self-made tapes". Five hundred actors auditioned, and James Franco was ultimately cast as James Dean in May 2000. Franco acknowledged he was cautious of taking the role over fear of typecasting.

Franco did extensive research for his role. He went from being a non-smoker to smoking two packs of cigarettes a day, but has since quit the habit. He learned how to ride a motorcycle, play guitar, as well as the conga and bongo drums. The actor also carefully studied Dean's mannerisms by watching his three films (East of Eden, Rebel Without a Cause and Giant). Franco also read numerous biographies on Dean's life. The actor also took advice from some of Dean's closest friends, including Martin Landau, Dennis Hopper, Liz Sheridan (Dean's former girlfriend) and Leonard Rosenman. "Martin was the most informative person that I spoke to. He helped me tremendously with James's physical mannerisms," Franco reflected. "I isolated myself a lot during the filming. I did this because I think he had a pervasive loneliness throughout his life and I wanted to feel what that felt like. Not talking to my family or loved ones had quite an emotional effect on me."

== Release ==
James Dean premiered at the 27th Deauville American Film Festival in July 2001. Press conferences were held with the screening, and James Dean's three feature films, East of Eden, Rebel Without a Cause and Giant, were also screened at the festival. Turner Network Television (TNT) originally intended to premiere the film on United States national television in June 2001, but the release date for James Dean was pushed to August 5, 2001. The film attracted 3.18 million viewers and received generally favorable reviews from critics. James Dean was released on DVD in January 2002 by Warner Home Video. David Thomson, reviewing in The New York Times, felt Franco's performance as Dean gave Baby Boomer audiences a positive sense of nostalgia of the 1950s. James Poniewozik of Time magazine also highly praised Franco's performance, but felt the script was overtly cliché. Ken Tucker wrote in Entertainment Weekly that James Dean, alongside Life with Judy Garland: Me and My Shadows (2001), was a revolutionary force in the television movie genre.

== Awards and nominations ==
Year	Award	Category	Nominee(s)	Result	Ref.
2002	American Cinema Editors Awards	Best Edited Motion Picture for Commercial Television	Antony Gibbs	Won	
2002	Artios Awards	Best Movie of the Week Casting	Nancy Foy	Won	
2002	Critics' Choice Awards	Best Actor in a Picture Made for Television	James Franco	Won	
2002	Directors Guild of America Awards	Outstanding Directing – Miniseries or TV film	Mark Rydell	Nominated	
2002	Golden Globe Awards	Best Actor in a Miniseries or Television Film	James Franco	Won	
2002	Online Film & Television Association Awards	Best Motion Picture Made for Television		Nominated	
2002	Online Film & Television Association Awards	Best Actor in a Motion Picture or Miniseries	James Franco	Nominated	
2002	Online Film & Television Association Awards	Best Supporting Actor in a Motion Picture or Miniseries	Michael Moriarty	Nominated	
2002	Online Film & Television Association Awards	Best Direction of a Motion Picture or Miniseries	Mark Rydell	Nominated	
2002	Online Film & Television Association Awards	Best Writing of a Motion Picture or Miniseries	Israel Horovitz	Nominated	
2002	Online Film & Television Association Awards	Best Ensemble in a Motion Picture or Miniseries		Nominated	
2002	Online Film & Television Association Awards	Best Editing in a Motion Picture or Miniseries		Nominated	
2002	Online Film & Television Association Awards	Best Makeup/Hairstyling in a Motion Picture or Miniseries		Nominated	
2002	Online Film & Television Association Awards	Best New Theme Song in a Motion Picture or Miniseries	John Frizzell	Nominated	
2002	Online Film & Television Association Awards	Best Production Design in a Motion Picture or Miniseries		Nominated	
2002	Primetime Emmy Awards	Outstanding Television Movie	Bill Gerber, Mark Rydell, and George W. Perkins	Nominated	
2002	Primetime Emmy Awards	Outstanding Lead Actor in a Miniseries or a Movie	James Franco	Nominated	
2002	Primetime Emmy Awards	Outstanding Supporting Actor in a Miniseries or a Movie	Michael Moriarty	Won	
2002	Primetime Emmy Awards	Outstanding Directing for a Miniseries or Movie	Mark Rydell	Nominated	
2002	Primetime Emmy Awards	Outstanding Art Direction for a Miniseries or Movie	Robert Pearson, Marc Dabe, and Leslie McCarthy-Frankenheimer	Won	
2002	Primetime Emmy Awards	Outstanding Casting for a Miniseries or Movie	Nancy Foy	Nominated	
2002	Primetime Emmy Awards	Outstanding Cinematography for a Miniseries or Movie	Robbie Greenberg	Nominated	
2002	Primetime Emmy Awards	Outstanding Costumes for a Miniseries or Movie	Yvonne Blake and Randy Gardell	Nominated	
2002	Primetime Emmy Awards	Outstanding Hairstyling for a Miniseries or Movie	Carol A. O'Connell	Nominated	
2002	Primetime Emmy Awards	Outstanding Makeup (Non-Prosthetic)	John M. Elliott Jr.	Nominated	
2002	Primetime Emmy Awards	Outstanding Picture Editing for a Miniseries or Movie	Antony Gibbs	Nominated	
2002	Screen Actors Guild Awards	Outstanding Performance by a Male Actor in a Miniseries or Television Movie	James Franco	Nominated	

== Home media ==
The film was released on DVD and VHS on January 22, 2002, by Warner Home Video. It featured theatrical trailers for Rebel Without a Cause and Giant; English, French, Spanish subtitles; and Dolby Digital 5.1 Audio.
