= As I Lay Dying (film) =

2013 film

- Theatrical release poster
- Directed by: James Franco
- Written by: James Franco; Matthew Rager
- Based on: As I Lay Dying by William Faulkner
- Produced by: Caroline Aragon; Lee Caplin; Vince Jolivette; Avi Lerner; Miles Levy; Matthew O'Toole; Robert Van Norden
- Starring: James Franco; Logan Marshall-Green; Danny McBride; Tim Blake Nelson
- Cinematography: Christina Voros
- Edited by: Ian Olds
- Music by: Tim O'Keefe
- Production companies: Rabbit Bandini Productions; Picture Entertainment
- Distributed by: iTunes
- Release dates: May 20, 2013 (Cannes); October 11, 2013 (US)
- Running time: 120 minutes
- Country: United States
- Language: English

As I Lay Dying is a 2013 American drama film directed and co-written by and starring James Franco, based on William Faulkner's 1930 novel of the same name. The film stars Franco, Tim Blake Nelson, Danny McBride, Logan Marshall-Green, Ahna O'Reilly, Jim Parrack, Beth Grant, and Brady Permenter.

The film was screened in the Un Certain Regard Section at the 2013 Cannes Film Festival.

== Premise ==
The story is based on the loss of a mother and the struggles the family endure by going the distance to her burial ground in her home town.

== Cast ==
- James Franco as Darl Bundren
- Logan Marshall-Green as Jewel Bundren
- Danny McBride as Vernon Tull
- Tim Blake Nelson as Anse Bundren
- Ahna O'Reilly as Dewey Dell Bundren
- Beth Grant as Addie Bundren
- Jim Parrack as Cash Bundren
- Jesse Heiman as Jody
- Scott Haze as Skeet MacGowan
- Brady Permenter as Vardaman Bundren

== Production ==
James Franco decided to write a screenplay of the novel with fellow Yale graduate student Matt Rager. The novel As I Lay Dying was described as a story impossible to be transformed into a film due to the multi-narrative voices within it. Franco saw this as a challenge and chose to depict the many voices through choices of styling, through camera edits. Faulkner told the story in a chorus of voices: 15 narrators in the 59 chapters. To locate an equivalent for the novel’s polyphonal scheme, Franco employed the use of narrative expressed through dialogue and voice overs.

== Release ==
The film was originally scheduled for a theatrical release on September 27, 2013 but Millennium Films scrapped the plans. It was released on October 22, 2013 to iTunes and November 5, 2013 to DVD/VOD platforms.

== Reception ==
The film received mixed reviews from critics, with praise and criticism focused on Franco's methods of presenting Faulkner's complex narrative. It holds a 38% approval rating on review aggregator Rotten Tomatoes, based on 29 reviews with an average rating of 4.6/10. The website's critical consensus states: "As I Lay Dying finds director, star, and co-writer James Franco attempting to adapt one of William Faulkner's weightier works, with disappointingly muddled results". Metacritic gives the film a weighted average score of 50 out of 100, based on 13 reviews, indicating "mixed or average" reviews.

A. O. Scott of The New York Times said, "But in rushing in where wise men might fear to tread, Mr. Franco has accomplished something serious and worthwhile. His As I Lay Dying is certainly ambitious, but it is also admirably modest. The script, written by Mr. Franco with Matt Rager, tries to pare Faulkner's multivoiced narrative to a manageable essence."
