= James Franco =

American actor and filmmaker (born 1978)

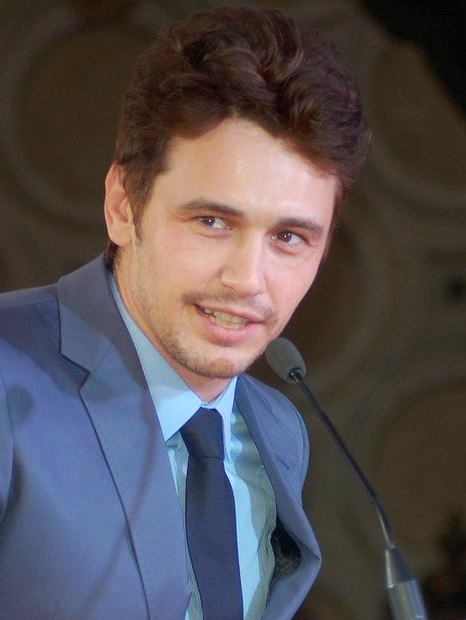
- Franco in 2013
- Born: James Edward Franco; April 19, 1978 (age 48); Palo Alto, California, U.S.
- Education: University of California, Los Angeles (BA); Columbia University (MFA)
- Occupations: Actor; film director; producer; screenwriter
- Years active: 1997–2019, 2024–present
- Works: Filmography
- Relatives: Dave Franco (brother); Tom Franco (brother)
- Awards: Full list

James Edward Franco (born April 19, 1978) is an American actor and filmmaker. He has starred in numerous films, including Sam Raimi's Spider-Man trilogy (2002–2007), Milk (2008), Eat Pray Love (2010), Rise of the Planet of the Apes (2011), Spring Breakers (2012), and Oz the Great and Powerful (2013). He has collaborated with fellow actor Seth Rogen on multiple projects, including Pineapple Express (2008), This Is the End (2013), The Interview (2014), Sausage Party (2016), and The Disaster Artist (2017), for which he won a Golden Globe Award for Best Actor. Franco's performance in 127 Hours (2010) earned a Best Actor nomination at the 83rd Academy Awards.

In his first prominent television role, Franco played Daniel Desario on the short-lived ensemble comedy-drama Freaks and Geeks (1999–2000), which developed a cult following. He portrayed the title character in the television biographical film James Dean (2001), for which he won a Golden Globe Award, and received nominations for a Screen Actors Guild Award and a Primetime Emmy Award. Franco had a recurring role on the daytime soap opera General Hospital (2009–2012) and starred in the limited series 11.22.63 (2016). He starred in the David Simon-created HBO drama The Deuce (2017–2019).

In 2014, a 17-year-old girl posted several screenshots of messages she said she and Franco had exchanged on Instagram. The messages showed that Franco, then 35, tried to meet her in a hotel room even after she told him she was only 17. In 2018, the Los Angeles Times reported that five women had accused Franco of inappropriate or sexually exploitative behavior while Franco was serving as their acting teacher or mentor. A lawsuit filed by some of Franco's former acting students alleged sexual harassment and fraud. It was settled for $2.2 million in 2021.

== Early life ==
James Edward Franco was born in Palo Alto, California, on April 19, 1978. His mother, Betsy Lou (née Verne; born 1947), is a children's book author and occasional actress, and his father, Douglas Eugene Franco (1948–2011), ran a Silicon Valley business.

His father was of Portuguese and Swedish ancestry, while his mother was from a family of Russian Jews.

His paternal grandmother, Marjorie (née Peterson), is a published author of young adult books. His maternal grandfather, Daniel, changed his surname from "Verovitz" to "Verne" some time after 1940, and his maternal grandmother, Mitzie (née Levine), owned the prominent Verne Art Gallery in Cleveland, Ohio, and was an active member in the National Council of Jewish Women.

Franco's family upbringing was "academic, liberal, and largely secular". He grew up in California with his two younger brothers, actors Tom and Dave. A "math whiz", Franco interned at Lockheed Martin. He was often encouraged by his father to get good grades and did well on the SAT. In 1996 he graduated from Palo Alto High School, where he acted in plays. This led to him attending CSSSA in 1998 for theater studies. In his high school years, Franco was arrested for underage drinking, graffiti, and being a part of a group that stole designer fragrances from department stores and sold them to classmates. These arrests led to Franco briefly becoming a ward of the state. Facing the possibility of juvenile hall, he was given a second chance by the judge. He recalled of his troubles with the law: "It was teen angst. I was uncomfortable in my own skin. I was shy. I changed my ways just in time to get good grades."

Although the idea of becoming a marine zoologist interested him, Franco had always secretly wanted to become an actor but feared being rejected. He enrolled at the University of California, Los Angeles (UCLA) as an English major, but dropped out after his first year (against his parents' wishes) to pursue a career as an actor, since he would have had to wait two years to audition for their acting program. He instead chose to take acting lessons with Robert Carnegie at the Playhouse West. Around this time, he took up a late-night job at McDonald's to support himself because his parents refused to do so. He had been a vegetarian for the year before he worked there. While working there, he practiced accents on customers, an experience he remembered nostalgically in a 2015 Washington Post editorial titled "McDonald's was there for me when no one else was".

== Acting career ==
=== 1997–2001 ===
After 15 months of training, Franco began auditioning in Los Angeles. His first paid role was a television commercial for Pizza Hut, featuring a dancing Elvis Presley. He found guest roles on television shows but his first break came in 1999, when he was cast in a leading role on the short-lived but well-reviewed NBC television series Freaks and Geeks, which ran for 18 episodes and was canceled due to low viewership. Later, the show became a cult hit among audiences. He has since called the series "one of the most fun" work experiences he has had. In another interview, Franco said: "When we were doing Freaks and Geeks, I didn't quite understand how movies and TV worked, and I would improvise even if the camera wasn't on me ... So I was improvising a little bit back then, but not in a productive way." After his film debut Never Been Kissed, he played a popular jock named Chris in Whatever It Takes (2000), a remake of the 1897 play Cyrano de Bergerac.

He was subsequently cast in the title role in director Mark Rydell's 2001 TV biographical film James Dean. To immerse himself in the role, Franco went from being a non-smoker to smoking two packs of cigarettes a day, bleached his dark brown hair blond, and learned to ride a motorcycle as well as play guitar and the bongos. To have a greater understanding of Dean, Franco spent hours with two of Dean's associates. Other research included reading books on Dean and studying his movies. While filming James Dean, Franco, to get into character, cut off communication with his family and friends, as well as his then-girlfriend. "It was a very lonely existence," he notes. "If I wasn't on a set, I was watching James Dean. That was my whole thinking. James Dean. James Dean." Despite already being a fan of Dean, Franco feared he might be typecast if he'd captured the actor too convincingly. Ken Tucker of Entertainment Weekly wrote: "Franco could have walked through the role and done a passable Dean, but instead gets under the skin of this insecure, rootless young man." He received a Golden Globe Award and nominations for an Emmy Award and a Screen Actors Guild Award (SAG).

=== 2002–2007 ===
Franco achieved worldwide fame and attention in the 2002 superhero film Spider-Man, in which he played Harry Osborn, the son of the villainous Green Goblin (Willem Dafoe) and best friend of Peter Parker / Spider-Man (Tobey Maguire). Franco was also considered for the role of Parker. Todd McCarthy of Variety noted that there are "good moments" between Maguire and Franco in the film. Spider-Man was a commercial and critical success. The movie grossed $114 million during its opening weekend in North America and went on to earn $822 million worldwide.

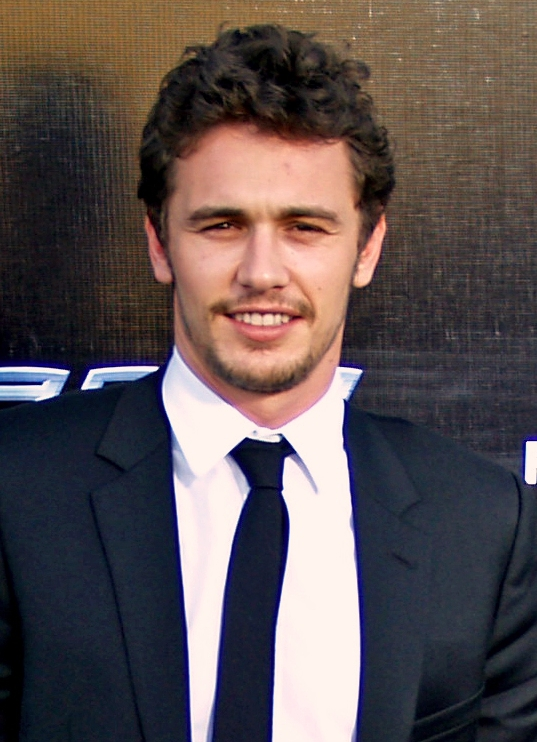
Franco at the Spider-Man 3 premiere, April 2007

He next starred in Sonny, a 2002 release in which he was directed by Nicolas Cage, whose involvement had attracted Franco to the film. Set in 1980s New Orleans, Sonny follows the titular character (Franco) returning home after just being discharged from the Army. To prepare for his role, he met with sex workers or people who had previously been prostitutes. The movie was panned by critics. Franco was cast as a homeless drug addict in the drama City by the Sea (2002) after co-star Robert De Niro saw a snippet of his work in James Dean. He lived on the streets for several days to better understand the subject matter as well as talking to former or still-using drug addicts. He also co-starred with Neve Campbell in Robert Altman's ballet movie The Company (2003). The success of the first Spider-Man film led Franco to reprise the role in the 2004 sequel, Spider-Man 2. The movie was well received by critics, and it proved to be a big financial success, setting a new opening weekend box office record for North America. With a revenue of $783 million worldwide, it became the second highest-grossing film in 2004. In 2005 he made and starred in the black comedy The Ape and the war film The Great Raid, in which he portrayed Robert Prince, a captain in the United States Army's elite Sixth Ranger Battalion. In 2006, Franco co-starred with Tyrese Gibson in Annapolis and played legendary hero Tristan in Tristan & Isolde, a period piece dramatization of the Tristan and Iseult story, also starring Sophia Myles. For the former, he did eight months of boxing training, and for the latter, he practiced horseback riding and sword fighting. He then completed training for his Private Pilot Licence in preparation for his role in Flyboys, which was released in September 2006; the same month, Franco appeared briefly in The Wicker Man, the remake of the seminal horror film. Also in 2006, he made a cameo appearance in the romantic comedy The Holiday.

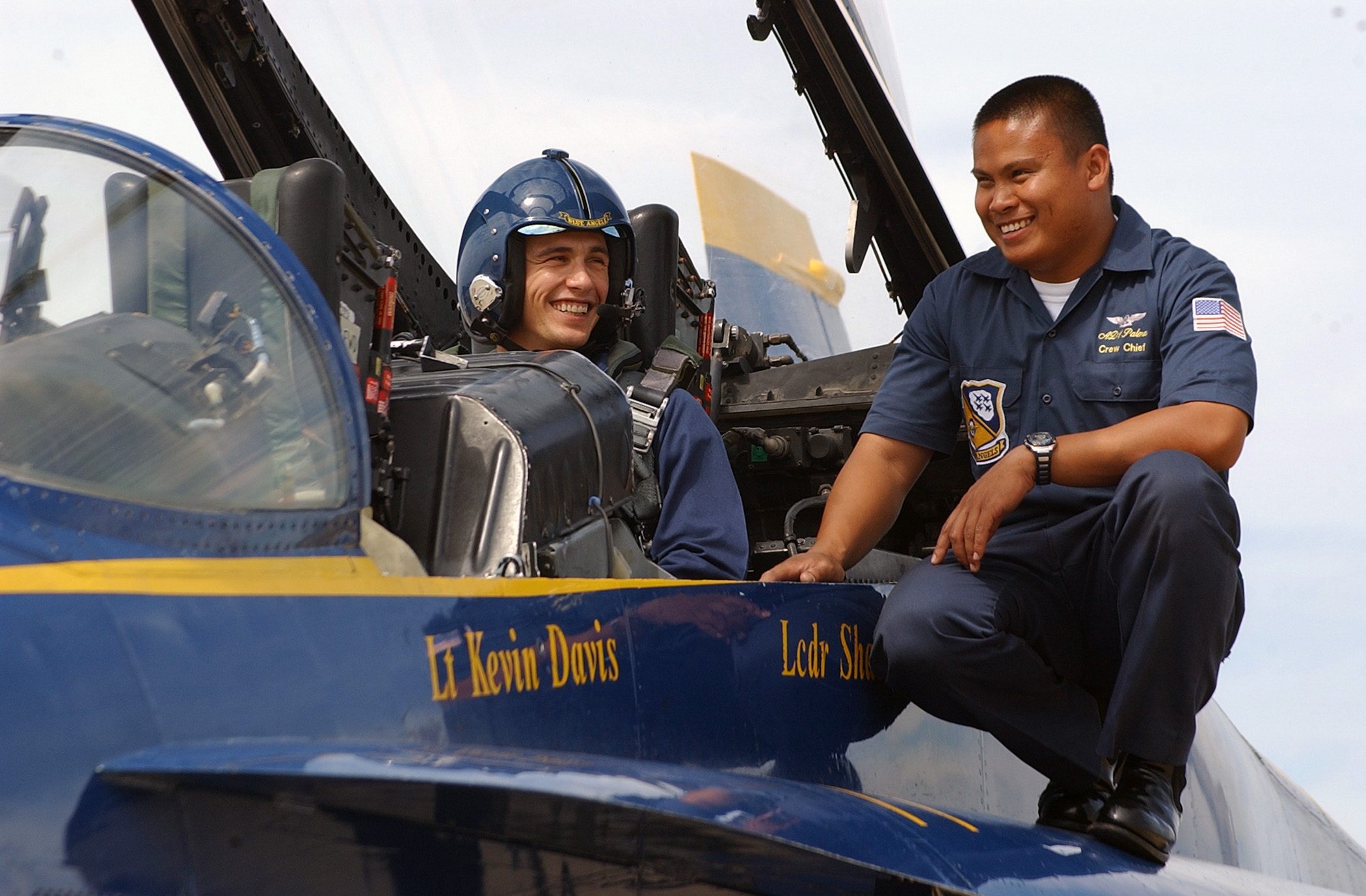
Franco, preparing to ride in the Blue Angels No. 7, with Patrick Palma in a two-seat F/A-18B, in August 2006

He again played Harry Osborn in Spider-Man 3 (2007). In contrast to the previous two films' positive reviews, Spider-Man 3 was met with a mixed reception by critics. Nonetheless, with a total worldwide gross of $891 million, it stands as the most successful film in the series, and Franco's highest-grossing film to date. In this same year, Franco made a cameo appearance as himself in the Apatow-directed comedy Knocked Up, which starred Freaks and Geeks alumni Seth Rogen, Jason Segel and Martin Starr. Franco co-starred with Sienna Miller in the low-budget independent film Camille, a dark fantasy dramedy about a young newlywed couple and Interview, where he appears in a voice only role, both 2007 movies that were ignored by audiences and critics alike. Among his other 2007 projects were Good Time Max, which Franco wrote, directed and starred in. The movie premiered at the 2007 Tribeca Film Festival and tells the story of two talented brothers who take very diverse paths in life, one going on to become a doctor whilst the other sibling (Franco) experiences unemployment and uses drugs. The actor chose to cast himself in that role because, "It was really just a process of elimination. I was better suited for this role than the responsible surgeon".

=== 2008–2010 ===
He next starred in Pineapple Express (2008), a stoner comedy co-starring and co-written by Seth Rogen and produced by Judd Apatow. Of Franco's character, Apatow said, "You tell him, 'Okay, you're going to play a pot dealer', and he comes back with a three-dimensional character you totally believe exists. He takes it very seriously, even when it's comedy". In her New York Times review, critic Manohla Dargis wrote: "He's delightful as Saul, loosey-goosey and goofy yet irrepressibly sexy, despite that greasy curtain of hair and a crash pad with a zero WAF (Woman Acceptance Factor). It's an unshowy, generous performance and it greatly humanizes a movie that, as it shifts genre gears and cranks up the noise, becomes disappointingly sober and self-serious". His performance earned him a second Golden Globe nomination, for Best Actor in a Musical or Comedy. He has stated in some interviews that he no longer uses cannabis (although he has occasionally alluded to smoking it, most notably during an extended segment on The Colbert Report). He was awarded High Times magazine's Stoner of the Year Award for his work in Pineapple Express. In 2008 he also appeared in two films by American artist Carter, exhibited at the Yvon Lambert gallery in Paris. On September 20, 2008, he hosted the sketch comedy show Saturday Night Live (SNL), and a second time on December 19, 2009.

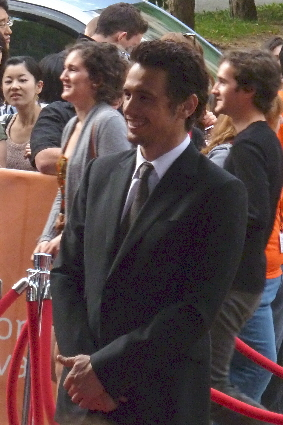
Franco at the premiere of 127 Hours

Franco starred with Sean Penn, Josh Brolin and Emile Hirsch, in Gus Van Sant's Milk (2008). In the film he plays Scott Smith, the boyfriend of Harvey Milk (Penn). Kenneth Turan of the Los Angeles Times, in review of the film, wrote: "Franco is a nice match for him [Penn] as the lover who finally has enough of political life". For his performance in the film, Franco won the Independent Spirit Award in the category for Best Supporting Actor. In late 2009 he joined the cast of the daytime soap opera General Hospital on a recurring basis. He plays Franco, a multimedia artist much like himself, who comes to Port Charles to do an art exhibition and becomes obsessed with Jason Morgan (Steve Burton). Franco has called his General Hospital role performance art.

Franco began 2010 by making an appearance on the sitcom 30 Rock where he played himself and carried on a fake romance with Jenna Maroney (Jane Krakowski) in a scheme concocted by their respective agents. After appearing in the commercial successes Date Night, an action comedy, and Eat Pray Love, an adaption of a novel, Franco played poet Allen Ginsberg in the drama Howl, released on September 24. The latter, about his most known poem and the trial about the work, premiered at the Berlin Film Festival and earned modest reviews.

In his next project, 127 Hours, directed by Danny Boyle, Franco portrayed real-life mountain climber Aron Ralston. It was given a limited release starting on November 5, 2010. 127 Hours centered on Ralston trying to free his hand after it became trapped under a boulder in a ravine while canyoneering alone in Utah and resorting to desperate measures in order to survive, eventually amputating his arm. During the five-week, 12-hours-per-day shoot, Franco would only leave the gully set to use the lavatory and would read books such as academic textbooks to keep busy. Franco later called making 127 Hours a once-in-a-lifetime experience. To date, 127 Hours is one of his most well-reviewed movies and was also a commercial success, earning $60.7 million against an $18 million budget. His performance earned him universal acclaim from critics. Subsequently, he was nominated for an Academy Award, Golden Globe and SAG award, as well as winning an Independent Spirit Award.

=== 2011–present ===
On February 23, 2011, Franco made a cameo appearance on NBC's Minute to Win It where the real-life Ralston was participating as a contestant playing for charity. After having a cameo in the opening scene of The Green Hornet (2011), he starred opposite Natalie Portman and Danny McBride in the Medieval fantasy comedy Your Highness. In the film, he plays Fabious, a prince who teams up with his brother (McBride) to rescue the soon to be bride of Fabious (played by Zooey Deschanel). In May 2010, he was cast to star in Rupert Wyatt's $93 million budgeted Rise of the Planet of the Apes, a reboot of the Planet of the Apes series which was released on August 5, 2011. Franco starred alongside Winona Ryder in The Letter, originally entitled The Stare, directed by Jay Anania. He was cast as a drug-addicted lawyer in About Cherry, also starring Heather Graham, which started shooting the following month in California. He dropped out of the indie film While We're Young to star in Oz the Great and Powerful, a Disney prequel to L. Frank Baum's The Wonderful Wizard of Oz (1900). Filming began in July 2011, and the film was released on March 8, 2013. He has signed to appear in a sequel to it.

At the end of September 2010, Franco acquired the rights to Stephen Elliott's The Adderall Diaries, with the intention to adapt, direct, and star in the film. It was announced in January 2011 that Franco had planned to star in and direct The Night Stalker, a film version of author Philip Carlo's book about the serial killer Richard Ramirez. The screenplay's co-writer Nicholas Constantine was unconvinced that Franco would be right for the movie until he learned of Franco's desire to be a director and watched three of his short films, one of which featured a serial killer. Franco also directed a film version of William Faulkner's novel As I Lay Dying; the film was screened in the Un Certain Regard section at the 2013 Cannes Film Festival. In late 2013, Franco starred in This Is the End as a fictionalized version of himself stuck in a house during an apocalypse with Seth Rogen, Jay Baruchel, Craig Robinson, Jonah Hill, and Danny McBride, also fictionalized versions of themselves.

In February 2012, Franco began shooting a film version of Cormac McCarthy's 1973 novella Child of God, which stars Scott Haze as Lester Ballard. The film chronicles the depraved and violent impulses of a young Tennessee backwoodsman after he is dispossessed of his ancestral land. Child of God was selected in official competition at the 70th Venice Film Festival and was an official selection at the 2013 Toronto International Film Festival and the 51st New York Film Festival. In 2013, Franco starred as the gangster "Alien" in Harmony Korine's Spring Breakers, with Vanessa Hudgens, Selena Gomez, Ashley Benson, Gucci Mane, and Rachel Korine. In September 2013, A24 films began a campaign in support of a Best Supporting Actor Oscar nomination for Franco's performance. In March 2013, it was announced that Franco was set to make his 2014 Broadway stage debut as George in a revival of John Steinbeck's Of Mice and Men. In October 2013, Franco appeared in the video for "City of Angels" by Thirty Seconds to Mars.

On March 8, 2013, Franco received a star on the Hollywood Walk of Fame, at 6838 Hollywood Boulevard.

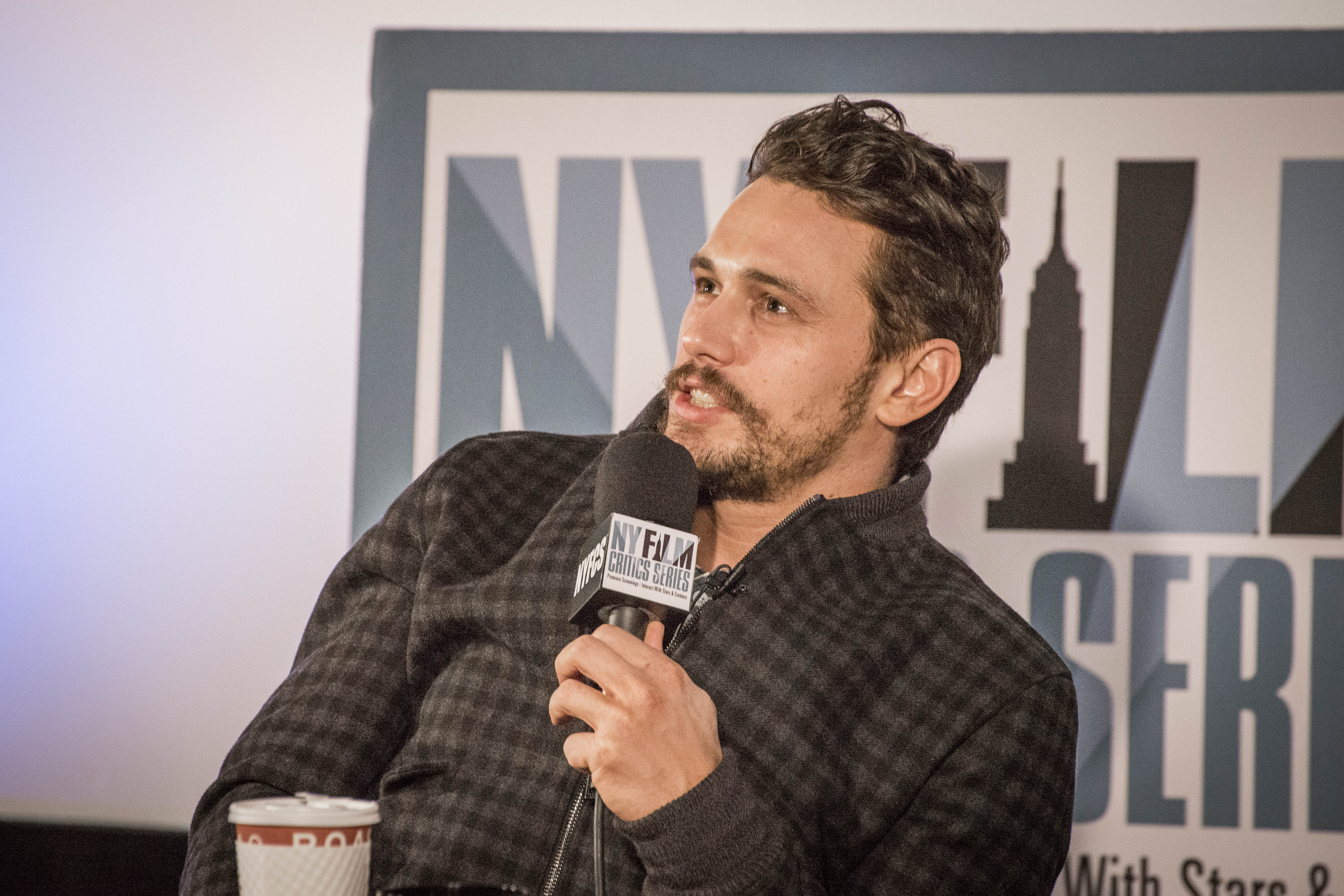
Franco at the New York Film Critics Series premiere of Child of God

In April 2014, Franco directed and appeared in "Techno Color Sunglasses", which promoted Gucci's eyewear collection. In December, Franco starred in the Sony comedy thriller The Interview, which played a central role in the diplomatic relations between the United States and North Korea as they related to the 2014 Sony hacking incident. In April 2015, two of his projects, I Am Michael and True Story, were shown at the 2015 Sundance Film Festival. In I Am Michael, Franco plays a gay activist who rejects his homosexuality and becomes a conservative Christian pastor with a girlfriend. In True Story, based on a true story, Franco played Christian Longo, a man who was on the FBI's most wanted list for murdering his wife and three children in Oregon, and who had also been hiding under the identity of Michael Finkel, a journalist played by Jonah Hill.

In 2015, Franco was cast in the lead role for the Hulu limited series 11.22.63, based on Stephen King's novel of the same name. The eight-episode series premiered on February 15, 2016. In 2016, Franco co-produced and starred in King Cobra, a true story about the rise of gay pornographic actor Brent Corrigan and the murder of Bryan Kocis. Franco played Joseph Kerekes, who (along with his partner) was convicted of the murder. In the comedy Why Him?, released in December 2016, Franco played an immature tech-billionaire whose girlfriend's conservative father tries to intervene in the couple's relationship, with Zoey Deutch as the girlfriend and Bryan Cranston as her father. Franco briefly appeared in the Alien prequel Alien: Covenant alongside his longtime friend and frequent collaborator Danny McBride, as well as Michael Fassbender and Noomi Rapace. He played Branson, the captain of the Covenant ship and husband to Daniels, played by Katherine Waterston. The film was released on May 19, 2017.

In 2016, Franco directed, co-produced, and starred in The Disaster Artist, the film adaptation of actor Greg Sestero's nonfiction book of the same name, about the making of The Room, which is considered to be one of worst films ever made. In the film, Franco portrayed the film's star, director, screenwriter, and producer Tommy Wiseau, while Franco's brother, Dave, portrayed Sestero. Franco remained in character as Wiseau throughout the shoot. The Disaster Artist was released on December 1, 2017, to positive reviews, while his portrayal of Wiseau gained near universal praise. His performance won a Golden Globe Award for Best Actor – Motion Picture Musical or Comedy.

At the end of 2017, Franco, almost 40, said he was slowing down to focus on himself.

On December 23, 2021, Franco gave his first interview in nearly four years on an episode of the Jess Cagle Podcast. In August 2022, Franco was cast as Fidel Castro in Alina in Cuba (later retitled Castro's Daughter), a casting decision that Castro's daughter supported.

In October 2024, Hey Joe starring Franco premiered at the Rome Film Festival, and the film opened in Italian cinemas on November 28, 2024.

Franco also appeared in 2024 in the French thriller The Price of Money: A Largo Winch Adventure.

In May 2025, Deadline reported that Lionsgate's partner Grindstone acquired U.S. distribution for the true-crime feature Golden State Killer (retitled from The Policeman), with Vincent Gallo as serial killer Joseph James DeAngelo and Franco as the detective trying to catch him.

== Other projects ==
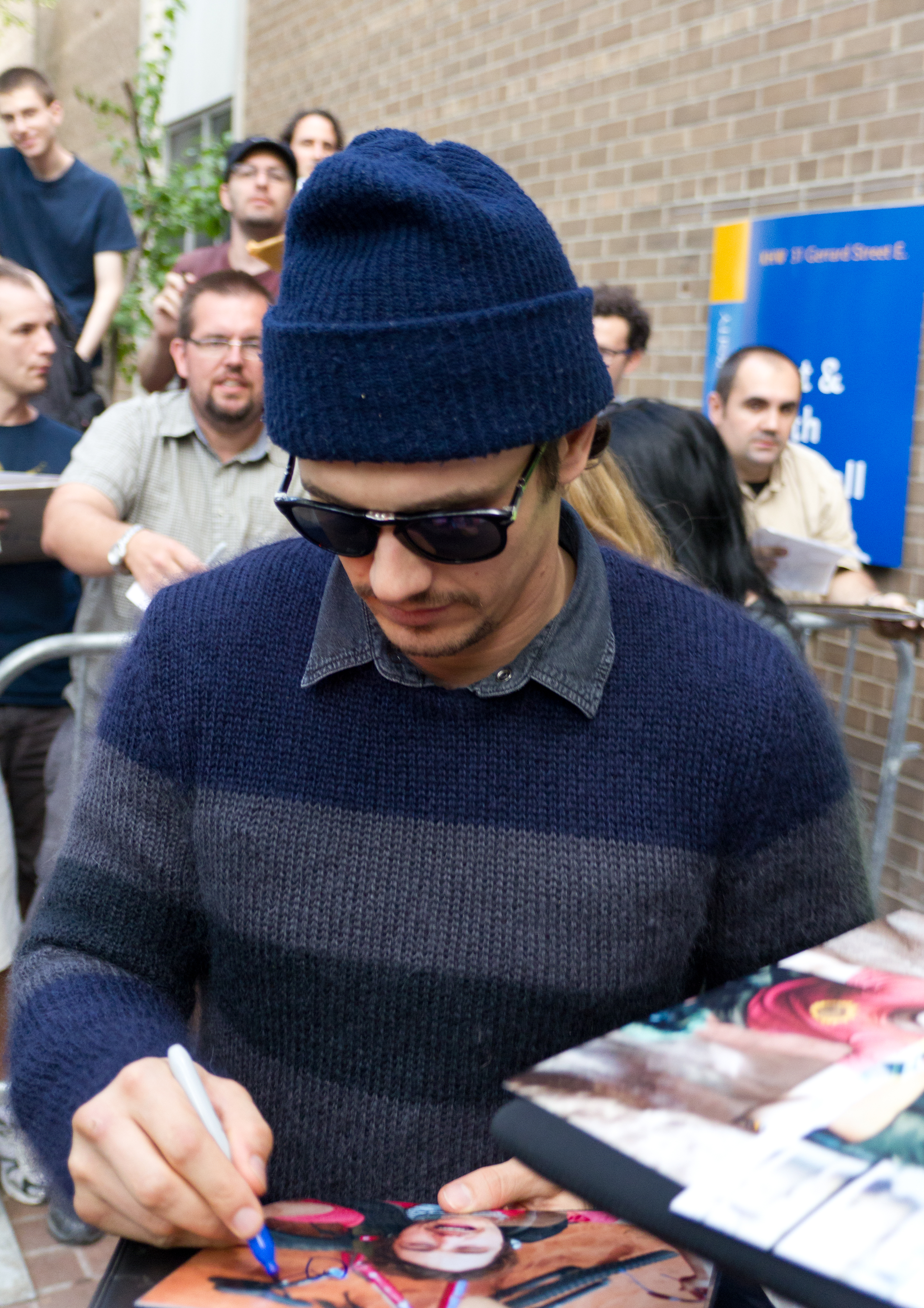
Franco signing an autograph

Franco produced and directed a documentary, Saturday Night, that chronicles a week in the production of an episode of SNL. The film began as a short for an NYU class, but grew due to his two episodes as host, while short stories he wrote for other classes appeared in Esquire and McSweeney's. In summer 2010, the fictional Franco from General Hospital held an exhibit at the Museum of Contemporary Art in Los Angeles, while the real Franco held an exhibit at the museum based on his experiences on the soap opera.

In 2008, Franco was named as the face of Gucci's men's fragrance line. His short films as director The Feast of Stephen and Herbert White were both presented at the May 2010 Maryland Film Festival. Another of his short movies, The Clerk's Tale, was screened in competition at the Hamptons Film Festival at the end of 2010. In June 2010, Franco presented his first solo exhibition, "The Dangerous Book Four Boys", at The Clocktower Gallery in New York City. Curated by Alanna Heiss, the show featured video, drawings, sculptures and installation.

On October 19, 2010, Scribner published a collection of short stories, Palo Alto, by Franco. The book is named after the California city where Franco grew up, and is dedicated to many of the writers he worked with at Brooklyn College. Inspired by some of Franco's own teenage memories, as well as memories written and submitted by high school students at Palo Alto Senior High School, Palo Alto consists of life in that city as experienced by a series of teenagers who spend most of their time indulging in driving drunk, smoking marijuana, and taking part in unplanned acts of violence. Each passage is told by a young narrator. The book received mixed reviews; Los Angeles Times called it "the work of an ambitious young man who clearly loves to read, who has a good eye for detail, but who has spent way too much time on style and virtually none on substance". The Guardian reported that Franco's "foray into the literary world may be met with cynicism in some quarters, but this is a promising debut from a most unlikely source". In The New York Times, Joshua Mohr praised the juxtaposition of history with present-day social commentary in the story "American History", writing that it "makes the we wonder how much we've actually evolved in post-bellum America". At least one editor of a literary journal said he would not publish Franco's stories, claiming he had been published due to his star power, not literary talent. Publishers Weekly wrote, "The author fails to find anything remotely insightful to say in these 11 amazingly underwhelming stories".

In January 2011, Franco screened his multimedia project Three's Company The Drama, in which he merges video and art to update the titular sitcom, at the 2011 Sundance Film Festival. Franco reunited with Milk director Van Sant to make Unfinished, a project that features two movies: Endless Idaho and My Own Private River. Endless Idaho showcases edited outtakes, deleted scenes, and behind-the-scenes footage from the 1991 movie My Own Private Idaho, while My Own Private River focuses on actor River Phoenix. The idea was conceived after Van Sant introduced unused footage from the 1991 film to Franco, inspiring him to turn it into something more. Unfinished opened from February 26 to April 9 at the Gagosian Gallery in Beverly Hills.

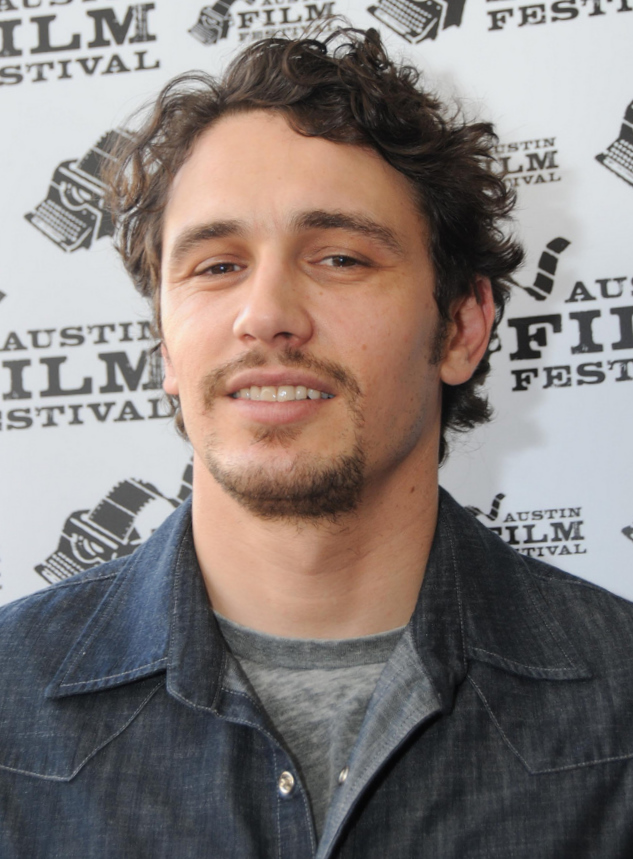
Franco at the Austin Film Festival, October 23, 2011

On February 27, 2011, Franco and Anne Hathaway hosted the 83rd Academy Awards. The two were selected to help the show attract a younger audience. Franco had previously said that he accepted the job for the experience and because it was a once-in-a-lifetime opportunity. Numerous viewers criticized Franco for his discontent and lack of energy onstage and the show was widely panned, with some reviewers calling it the worst telecast in its history. On the Late Show with David Letterman, Franco said that he never had high hopes, saying: "It was never on my list of things to do. It doesn't mean I didn't care and it doesn't mean I didn't try, right?" Of allegations that he was under the influence of cannabis while hosting, Franco said: "I think the Tasmanian Devil would look stoned standing next to Anne Hathaway. She has a lot of energy!" He concluded that he tried his best and could have had "low energy" during the telecast.

In May, Franco made his dance-theater directorial debut in New York's at Stella Adler Studios, where he narrated all the performances. The mixed-media piece, Collage, featured live dance, theater, music, and poetry. Tickets were free, distributed on a first-come, first-served basis. Franco also directed two short films for songs ("Blue" and "That Someone Is You") from R.E.M.'s 2011 album Collapse into Now. He continued his career as a filmmaker with The Broken Tower, a 90-minute black-and-white docudrama about poet Hart Crane, who committed suicide by jumping off the steamship SS Orizaba. It started out as Franco's master's thesis. It was screened at 2011's Los Angeles Film Festival among more than 200 feature films, short projects, and music videos from more than 30 countries. It was released on DVD in 2012.

In 2011, Franco taught a graduate-level film course at New York University's Tisch School of the Arts. He has also taught film classes at USC and UCLA, as well as a screenwriting class on the online learning community Skillshare. For his students' film projects, Franco has helped to attract actors, including Seth MacFarlane, Kate Mara, Natalie Portman, Chloë Sevigny, Kristen Wiig and Olivia Wilde.

Franco developed an aptitude for art—painting in particular—during his high school years while attending the California State Summer School for the Arts (CSSSA). He has said painting was the "outlet" he needed in high school, and he "has actually been painting longer than he has been acting". His paintings were first publicly displayed at the Glü Gallery in Los Angeles, from January 7 to February 11, 2006. He launched his first European art exhibition in 2011 at Peres Projects in Berlin.

In September 2012, Franco announced the release of his band Daddy's first single Love in the Old Days and their first EP MotorCity. On July 9, 2013, Franco announced that he would be the featured roastee on the next Comedy Central Roast. The roast aired on September 2, 2013.

In February 2014, Franco wrote an article in The New York Times in support of the metamodernist performance art of Shia LaBeouf, describing LaBeouf's project as one "in which a young man in a very public profession tries to reclaim his public persona". In April 2014, the literary publisher Graywolf Press issued Franco's first collection of poetry, Directing Herbert White. The title alludes to a poem (made by Franco into a 2010 short film) by Frank Bidart, who has served as friend and mentor to Franco.

== In the media ==
Viewed as a sex symbol, Franco was named the Sexiest Man Living in 2009 by Salon. He has had frequent media coverage, particularly of his interest in going to colleges. Franco has also claimed to have been misquoted by the media and that news outlets reported erroneous information about him. This led to his being parodied in an episode of SNL's Weekend Update segment, which an Entertainment Weekly writer deemed "clever". In a 2011 interview, he said:

I've been perceived as this guy yelling, "Hey, look at me. I want attention." I'm not going to school to get articles written about me. I'm just going to school. But the fact that I'm going to school or that someone takes a picture of me sleeping is like, "We're gonna jump on that and criticize him for his antics." What antics? I write. I make movies. I'm going to school. I hosted the Oscars. I take these projects seriously.

Franco has a reputation for publishing "selfies". In a 2013 explanatory article for The New York Times, he wrote:

[A] well-stocked collection of selfies seems to get attention. And attention seems to be the name of the game when it comes to social networking. In this age of too much information at a click of a button, the power to attract viewers amid the sea of things to read and watch is power indeed. It's what the movie studios want for their products, it's what professional writers want for their work, it's what newspapers want—hell, it's what everyone wants: attention. Attention is power.

In April 2012, Shalom Life ranked Franco and his brother, Dave, together as number two on its list of 50 talented and attractive Jewish men. In 2013, Franco was featured as the cover model and featured focus in the men's magazine Man of the World.

In other forms of media, a Chicago-based theater company, Under the Gun Theater, developed a show inspired by and titled after Franco. The 2015 production of Dear James Franco used, parodied and deconstructed letters penned to or by celebrities. The performances used improvisation to satirize their subject matter.

== Sexual misconduct accusations and lawsuit ==
In 2014, a 17-year-old girl posted screenshots of alleged messages between her and Franco on Instagram. The messages showed that Franco, then 35, tried to meet her in a hotel room after she told him she was 17. He sent multiple pictures of himself to prove his identity. Franco admitted on Live! With Kelly and Michael that he had written the messages. He and his supporters argued that his actions were legal as the age of consent in New York is 17. He initially responded to the scandal by tweeting, "I HOPE PARENTS KEEP THEIR TEENS AWAY FROM ME. Thank you." Franco also said: "I'm not going to high schools looking for dates." He later said he was "embarrassed" and that "I learned my lesson."

On January 7, 2018, at that year's Golden Globe Awards, Franco wore a Time's Up pin in solidarity with the MeToo movement, to protest sexual harassment against women. Ally Sheedy tweeted: "James Franco just won. Please never ask me why I left the film/tv business." A former girlfriend, Violet Paley, also said that he once forced her to give him oral sex in a car while they were dating.

On January 9, The New York Times, citing the allegations, canceled a planned event with Franco, explaining: "The event was intended to be a discussion of the making of the film, 'The Disaster Artist.' Given the controversy surrounding recent allegations, we're no longer comfortable proceeding in that vein".

The same day, Franco said during an appearance on The Late Show with Stephen Colbert that the accusations against him were "not accurate", commenting, "If I have done something wrong, I will fix it—I have to". Of Sheedy's tweets, he said: "I have no idea what I did to Ally Sheedy. I had nothing but a great time with her. I have total respect for her. I have no idea why she was upset."

On January 11, the Los Angeles Times reported that five women were accusing Franco of inappropriate or sexually exploitative behavior during the period when Franco was serving as their acting teacher or mentor. One former student said Franco "would always make everybody think there were possible roles on the table if we were to perform sexual acts or take off our shirts" in his projects. Another student said Franco removed privacy-protective plastic guards that had been used to cover student actresses' vaginas during a tutorial on filming sex scenes, while simulating oral sex with students. Franco's attorney, Michael Plonsker, disputed these allegations.

In her 2018 memoir, Busy Philipps recounted an incident while on the set of Freaks and Geeks, during which Franco screamed at her before violently shoving her to the ground.

On October 3, 2019, two former students of Franco's film and acting school, Studio 4, sued him and his partners. According to The New York Times, the complaint alleged that the program "sought to create a pipeline of young women who were subjected to his personal and professional sexual exploitation in the name of education". The lawsuit claimed that pupils were subjected to "sexually exploitative auditions and film shoots" and had to sign away their rights to the recordings. More specifically, the lawsuit alleged that Franco taught a class on sex scenes in which students were "encouraged to audition nude or partially nude if a scene called for nudity" and were "routinely pressured to engage in simulated sexual acts that went far beyond the standards in the industry". The lawsuit further alleged that the school "created, fostered and maintained a 'boy's club' culture wherein female students were sent a very clear message that if they refused advances from staff or refused to perform partially nude, they would not be considered for substantial roles". The litigants sought unspecified monetary damages as well as the return or destruction of any questionable material. Franco denied the plaintiffs' claims through his attorney.

On February 21, 2021, it was reported that the lawsuit was settled and that, according to documents filed on February 11, both students had agreed to drop their individual claims. The deal was submitted for preliminary court approval by March 15, 2021. In June 2021, terms of the settlement were revealed, and it was disclosed that Franco, pending a judge's approval, would pay more than $2.2 million to resolve two legal disputes:

- One by the two women who cited sexual exploitation; they would receive $894,000.
- Another class-action case, by approximately 1,500 Studio 4 students who maintain that they were defrauded.

A joint statement by the plaintiffs and defendants reads in part:

While Defendants continue to deny the allegations in the Complaint, they acknowledge that Plaintiffs have raised important issues; and all parties strongly believe that now is a critical time to focus on addressing the mistreatment of women in Hollywood.

Charlyne Yi worked with Franco on The Disaster Artist. In April 2021, Yi said that after they attempted to quit the film over the allegations against Franco, the filmmakers responded by offering them a larger role. Yi viewed this enticement as an attempted bribe and also accused Franco's longtime co-star Seth Rogen of enabling his behavior. A month later, Rogen said he did not condone abuse or harassment and would no longer work with Franco.

On December 23, 2021, Franco admitted to having had sex with students and said he had been in treatment for sexual addiction since 2016. He did not address other allegations of sexual misconduct.

== Philanthropy ==
Franco has volunteered at the charity the Art of Elysium, which helps children with serious medical conditions. He said the experience helped save his life. In January 2011, at the Art of Elysium Heaven Gala in Los Angeles, Franco was honored for his work at the hospital, receiving the Spirit of Elysium accolade.

On March 31, 2011, the actor took part in "An Evening with James Franco", a Washington D.C. dinner benefit for 826DC, a non-profit after-school literature program. Franco became involved with Dave Eggers' 826 National after Eggers asked him to do a conceptual idea for the program, and he directed a documentary for them and has since been a supporter of them. At the event, he spoke about how he thought schools needed to be more original with their literature programs. "Writing can do things that video cannot", he added. In April 2011, Franco autographed a T-shirt that would be auctioned off through the Yoshiki Foundation, with the proceeds being donated for Japanese tsunami relief. On June 14, he was honored by amfAR, the foundation for AIDS research, at the Museum of Modern Art. Franco received the Piaget Award of Inspiration for his humanitarian work and contributions to men's style.

In April 2013, Franco received the Ally Award at the 15th annual Miami Gay & Lesbian Film Festival. The award was presented to him in recognition of his unwavering support of the LGBT community.

In April 2014, Franco presented at Broadway Cares/Equity Fights AIDS Easter Bonnet Competition with Leighton Meester and Chris O'Dowd, after raising donations at his Broadway show Of Mice and Men. In June 2014, Franco performed in the BC/EFA benefit Broadway Bares.

== Personal life ==
=== Religious beliefs ===
Franco has described himself as Jewish; regarding his secular upbringing, he told The Guardian that he feels as if he has "missed out on the Jewish experience", but has been told not to worry about that by his Jewish friends and said in the same interview that he likes "the idea of religion as a source of community". When asked if he was a "believer", he responded, "In God? I don't know. Yes. To a certain extent. It's a complicated question." In 2015, he had an official bar mitzvah ceremony, presided over by a rabbi. Franco laid tefillin with Chabad activist Yossi Farro after the two met on a Los Angeles street.

=== Relationships and sexuality ===
Due to his support for the LGBT community and his portrayal of gay characters in his projects, Franco's sexuality has been a subject of discussion in media sources. In a March 2015 interview with Four Two Nine magazine, Franco again opened up about his sexuality, stating, "In the twenties and thirties, they used to define homosexuality by how you acted and not by whom you slept with. Sailors would fuck guys all the time, but as long as they behaved in masculine ways, they weren't considered gay. Well, I like to think that I'm gay in my art and straight in my life."

After meeting on the set of Whatever It Takes in 1999, Franco dated co-star Marla Sokoloff for five years. He was later in a relationship with actress Ahna O'Reilly until 2011. He confirmed their separation in an interview for Playboy magazine's August 2011 issue, saying that his interest in education got between them.

In 2024, People reported that Franco had been dating Izabel Pakzad since 2017.

=== Education ===
Franco, dissatisfied with his career's direction, reenrolled at UCLA in late 2006 as an English major with a creative writing concentration. He received permission to take as many as 62 course credits per quarter compared to the normal limit of 19, while still continuing to act, receiving many of his credits from independent study for his involvement on the set of Spider-Man 3. He received his undergraduate degree in June 2008 with a GPA of 3.5/4.0. For his degree, Franco prepared his departmental honors thesis as a novel under the supervision of Mona Simpson.

Franco was selected as the commencement speaker at UCLA, and was to speak at the ceremony on June 12, 2009. Several months before commencement, an editorial in the student newspaper questioned his "caliber" and a student created a Facebook page protesting the choice. On June 3, Franco withdrew, citing a date conflict with location pre-production on a film. On January 26, 2011, Franco and the Harvard Lampoon released a satirical video on prominent comedy website Funny or Die mocking his last-minute cancellation.

Franco moved to New York to simultaneously attend graduate school at Columbia University School of the Arts for writing, New York University's Tisch School of the Arts for filmmaking, and Brooklyn College for fiction writing, while also attending the low-residency MFA Program for Writers at North Carolina's Warren Wilson College for poetry. He received his M.F.A. from Columbia in 2010. As of 2010, Franco was studying in the Ph.D. program in English at Yale University. He has also attended the Rhode Island School of Design.

In an interview with Showbiz411, on September 23, 2010, Franco made the erroneous public announcement that he received a "D" grade in "Acting" class at the NYU Graduate Film School. He had, in fact, received that grade in a "Directing the Actor" class. Franco's professor, José Angel Santana, alleged that Franco did not earn his grades while attending that school and stated that Franco only received high marks and a degree because of his celebrity status as an actor. Franco made unfavorable comments about Santana's teaching. In September 2012, after having been terminated from his position, Santana filed a lawsuit against Franco for defamation; Santana claimed that Franco's comments were false and had led to his termination. In September 2013, Franco and Santana settled the defamation lawsuit. "The matter has been resolved to the mutual satisfaction of the parties," said Santana's attorney Matthew Blit. Franco defended himself on the Howard Stern Show, stating that he had told the professor before the semester began that he would have to miss most classes to film 127 Hours and that they had agreed that Franco would receive a "D" in the course.

In March 2013, Franco was featured in half-page print advertisements for his alma mater UCLA that celebrated him as a "prolific academic" and carried the tagline "Some A-Listers Actually Get A's".

=== Health ===
According to a 2013 Rolling Stone article, Franco is a teetotaler. He said he attended parties "if it's the right crowd". In a 2021 appearance on The Jess Cagle Podcast, he said: "I was in recovery before for substance abuse. There were some issues that I had to deal with that were also related to addiction. And so I've really used my recovery background to kind of start examining this and changing who I was."

== Selected works ==
- Franco, James. "A Star, a Soap and the Meaning of Art". The Wall Street Journal, December 4, 2009.
- Franco, James. "Just Before the Black". Esquire, March 24, 2010.
- Franco, Betsy (2009). Metamorphosis: Junior Year [With Earbuds]. Candlewick Press. ISBN 978-0763-6-3765-1.
- Franco, James (2010). Palo Alto: Stories. Scribner. ISBN 978-1-4391-6314-6.
- Hoffman, Alice (2011). Ploughshares Winter 2011–2012. Ploughshares. ISBN 978-1933-0-5821-4.
- Mattson, Joseph (2011). The Speed Chronicles. Akashic Books. ISBN 978-1617-7-5028-1.
- n+1 Issue 13: Machine Politics. n+1. 2012. ISBN 978-0982-5-9775-0.
- La Force, Thessaly (2012). My Ideal Bookshelf. Little, Brown and Company. ISBN 978-0316-2-0090-5.
- Franco, James (2012). Dangerous Book Four Boys. Rizzoli International Publications. ISBN 978-0847-8-3813-4.
- Franco, James (2012). 113 Crickets: Volume 2. Dymaxicon. ISBN 978-1937-9-6506-8.
- The Coffin Factory (Issue 3). The Coffin Factory. 2012.
- Franco, James (2012). Strongest of the Litter: (The Hollyridge Press Chapbook Series). Hollyridge Press. ISBN 978-0984-3-1005-0.
- Franco, James (2013). A California Childhood. Insight Editions. ISBN 978-1608-8-7202-2.
- Franco, James (2013). Actors Anonymous. Little A / New Harvest. ISBN 978-0544-1-1453-1.
- Franco, James (2014). "Acting In and Out of Context". In Wilson, Carl (ed.). Let's Talk About Love: Why Other People Have Such Bad Taste. New York: Bloomsbury Academic. pp. 233–243. ISBN 978-1-4411-6677-7.
- Franco, James (2014). Directing Herbert White: Poems. Graywolf Press. ISBN 978-1555-9-7673-6.
- Franco, James (2014). Hollywood Dreaming. Insight Editions. ISBN 978-1-60887-343-2.

== Discography ==
=== Albums ===
- 2011: Turn It Up EP – collaboration with Kalup Linzy
- 2012: MotorCity EP – with Tim O'Keefe, as the duo "Daddy"
- 2016: Let Me Get What I Want – with Tim O'Keefe, as the duo "Daddy"

=== Music on other albums ===
- 2013: "Hanging with Da Dopeboys" – featuring DangeRuss from album Spring Breakers: Music from the Motion Picture
- 2013: "I Love You" – featuring Kalup Linzy from album Romantic Loner
- 2015: "11/22/63"

== Stage ==
Year	Title	Role	Character	Venue
2014	Of Mice and Men	Performer	George	Longacre Theatre
2014	The Long Shift	Director		Rattlestick Theatre
