= Child of God (film) =

2013 film

- Theatrical release poster
- Directed by: James Franco
- Screenplay by: James Franco; Vince Jolivette
- Based on: Child of God by Cormac McCarthy
- Produced by: Caroline Aragon; Vince Jolivette; Miles Levy
- Starring: Scott Haze; Tim Blake Nelson; Jim Parrack; Nina Ljeti; Brian Lally; James Franco
- Cinematography: Christina Voros
- Edited by: Curtiss Clayton
- Music by: Aaron Embry
- Production companies: Rabbit Bandini Productions; Made In Film-Land
- Distributed by: Spotlight Pictures
- Release date: August 31, 2013 (Venice)
- Running time: 104 minutes
- Country: United States
- Language: English

Child of God is a 2013 American crime drama film co-written and directed by James Franco, and starring Scott Haze, based on the novel of the same name by Cormac McCarthy. It was selected to be screened in the official competition at the 70th Venice International Film Festival and was an official selection of the 2013 Toronto International Film Festival. The film made its United States premiere at the 51st New York Film Festival and then was screened at the 2013 Austin Film Festival.

== Plot ==
Set in mountainous Sevier County, Tennessee, in the 1950s, Child of God tells the story of Lester Ballard. Ballard is a dispossessed, violent man whom the narrator describes as "a child of God much like yourself perhaps." Ballard's life is a disastrous attempt to exist outside the social order. Successively deprived of parents and homes, and with few other ties, Ballard descends literally and figuratively to the level of a cave dweller, as he falls deeper into madness, crime and degradation.

The film differs from the novel regarding the ending. In the end of the novel Ballard dies in a mental hospital while in the film he escapes from the lynching mob through the tunnels and walks through the Tennessee fields.

== Cast ==
- Scott Haze as Lester Ballard
- Tim Blake Nelson as Sheriff Fate
- James Franco as Jerry
- Jim Parrack as Deputy Cotton
- Fallon Goodson as Girly
- Vince Jolivette as Ernest
- Brian Lally as John Greer
- Boyd Smith as Mr. Fox

== Production ==
On September 14, James Franco announced at the 2011 Toronto International Film Festival that he was set to direct an adaptation of Cormac McCarthy's third novel Child of God.

In January 2012, it was announced that Scott Haze had signed on to play Lester Ballard, the film's protagonist. It was also announced that Tim Blake Nelson and Jim Parrack had signed on to play Sheriff Fate and Deputy Cotton, respectively. Production on the film began on January 31, 2012, in West Virginia.

== Reception ==
Child of God has an approval rating of 42% on review aggregator website Rotten Tomatoes, based on 50 reviews, and an average rating of 4.9/10. The website's critical consensus states: "An obviously reverent adaptation that fails to make a case for the source material being turned into a movie, Child of God finds director James Franco outmatched by Cormac McCarthy's novel." Metacritic assigned the film a weighted average score of 50 out of 100, based on 17 critics, indicating "mixed or average" reviews.
