= Gamma Phi Beta Sorority House =

Gamma Phi Beta Sorority House may refer to:

- Gamma Phi Beta Sorority House (Urbana, Illinois)
- Gamma Phi Beta Sorority House (Eugene, Oregon)
