= Carter (artist) =

American painter (born 1970)

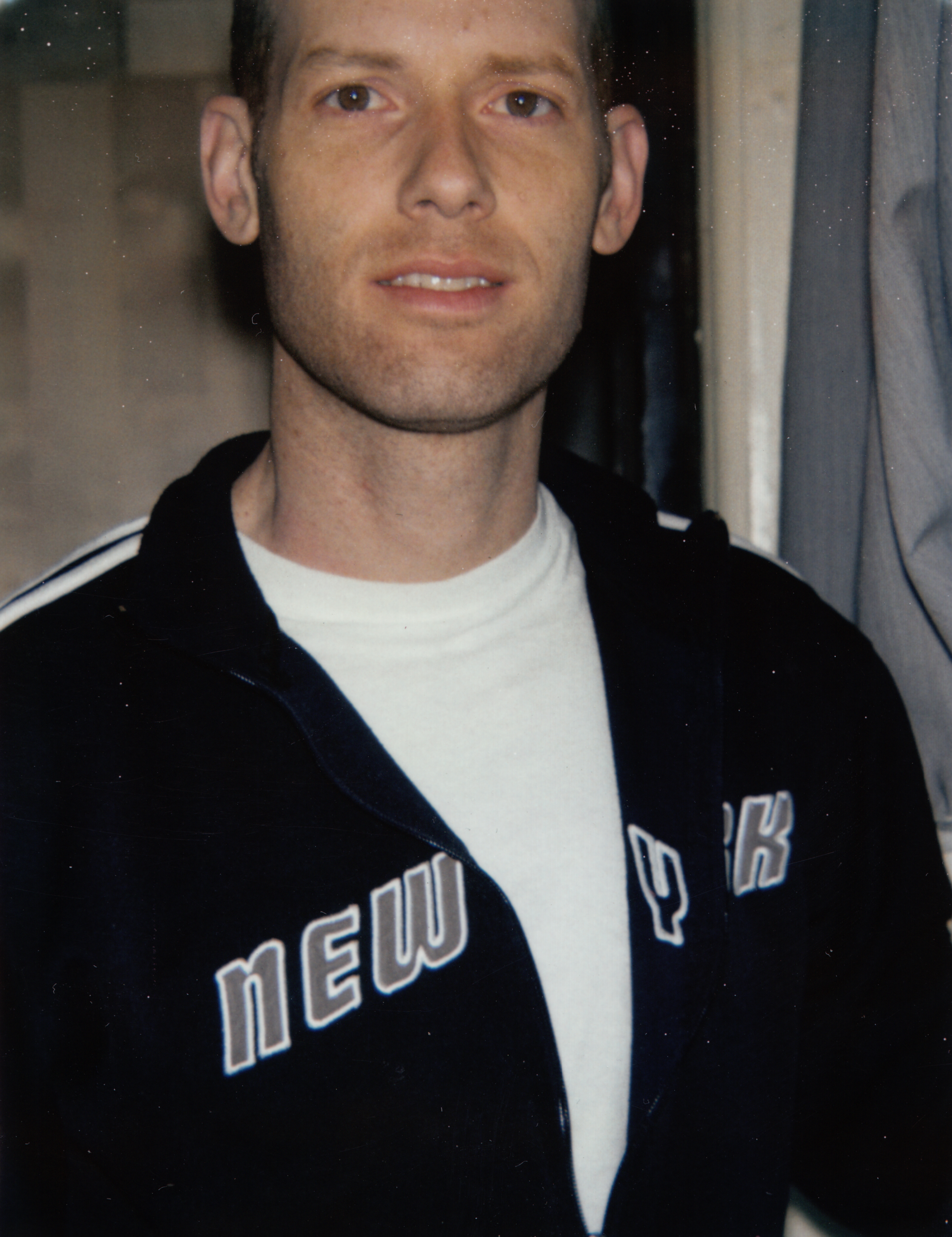
- Carter in 2008
- Born: John Carter; January 30, 1970 (age 56); Norwich, Connecticut, U.S.
- Education: Maryland Institute College of Art, University of California, Davis
- Occupations: Artist, director, author, screenwriter
- Known for: Conceptual Art

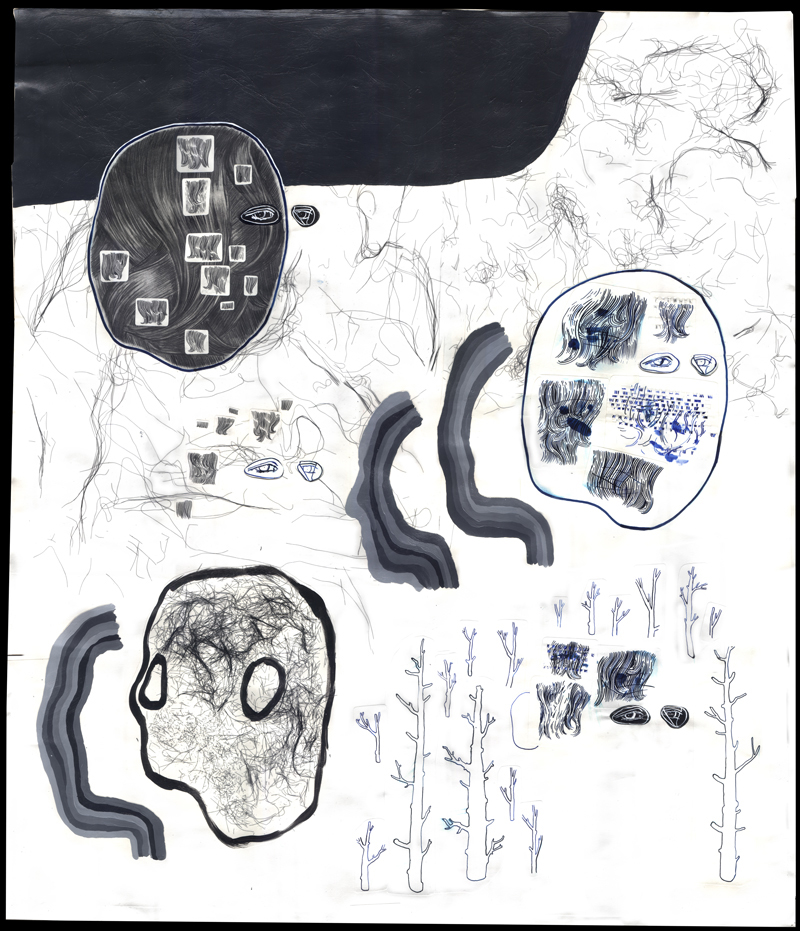
Carter, "Untitled, 2006#28"

Carter, "Polaroid,#8" 2005

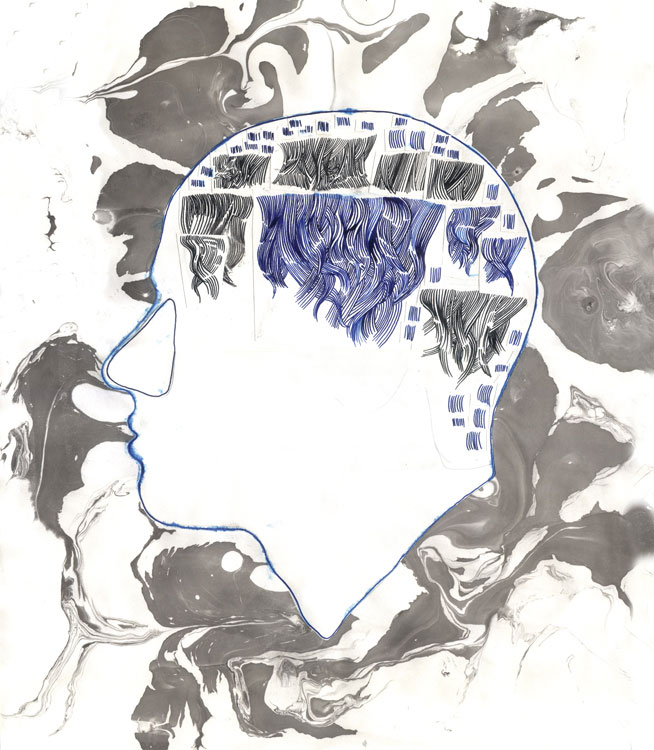
Carter, "Untitled" 2005

John Carter (born 1970) is an American multidisciplinary, conceptual artist and film director, using the professional name Carter for his artworks. He is based in New York City.

== About ==
Carter was born in Norwich, Connecticut and studied at the Maryland Institute College of Art (MICA), earning a Bachelor of Fine Arts degree in 1992. He then studied at the artists residency, Skowhegan School of Painting and Sculpture in 1994. Carter earned an M.F.A. degree in 1997 at University of California, Davis.

Carter is best known for his artwork that spans various media from painting and photography to sculptural installations, film and video. His works have been exhibited internationally, including the Whitney Museum of American Art in New York, Museum of Modern Art, New York, Tate Modern, London, San Francisco Museum of Modern Art, the USA Today and Abstract America exhibitions, at the Saatchi Gallery in London, England. His works have also been shown at the Royal Academy in London and the Museion in Bolzano, Italy.

A comprehensive catalogue of Carter's work edited by Georg Kargl was published in 2008 titled, An Arm with Hair, (The Vienna Catalogue 1973). Publication Studios in 2009 published Carter's "California Film: 1996".

== Film direction ==
Carter's first feature film, Erased James Franco was released in 2008. It stars the American actor, James Franco in a performance that has him reenact every film and television appearance from his entire career. The film also features Franco playing the part of Julianne Moore as her character in the film Safe directed by Todd Haynes and as Rock Hudson in the 1966 film Seconds.

James Franco's appearances as a version of 'himself' on the daytime soap opera, General Hospital was inspired by Carter and can be seen as another facet or an extension of the work that began with the film, Erased James Franco.

Maladies, written and directed by Carter was filmed in New York in December 2010. It stars Catherine Keener, James Franco, David Strathairn, Alan Cumming, Fallon Goodson and Mary Beth Peil and its soundtrack was composed by J Ralph. In 2013, Maladies, premiered at the Berlin International Film Festival and the SXSW film festival in Austin, Texas and was released theatrically and VOD through Tribeca Films in March, 2014.

Carter's Polaroid photography can be seen in the traveling exhibition, The Polaroid Years: Instant Photography and Experimentation and in the publication The Polaroid Years: Instant Photography and Experimentation.
