= Peil =

Peil is a surname. Notable people with the surname include:

- Edward Peil Sr. (1883–1958), American film actor
- Mary Beth Peil (born 1940), American actress and soprano

== See also ==
Gaelic football, sometimes referred to as Peil
