= Nanten =

Nanten (南天) is the Japanese for "southern sky". It may refer to:

- The plant Nandina, which is a latinised form of the same name
- 8210 NANTEN, asteroid named after a telescope of the same name
