= Gamma Phi Beta =

International college sorority

- ΓΦΒ
- Founded: November 11, 1874; 151 years ago Syracuse University
- Type: Social
- Affiliation: NPC
- Status: Active
- Scope: International
- Motto: "Founded on a Rock"
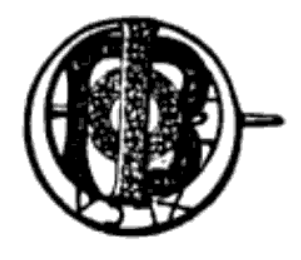
- Member badge
- Colors: Primary: Blush and A-la-Mode; Secondary: Once in A Blue Moon, Pearl, Brownstone, and Carnation
- Symbol: Crescent moon
- Flower: Pink carnation
- Jewel: Pearl
- Publication: The Crescent
- Philanthropy: Building Strong Girls and Girls on the Run
- Chapters: 190 collegiate, 175+ alumnae
- Members: 260,000+ lifetime
- Nickname: GPhi, GPhiB, Gamma Phi
- Headquarters: 9155 E. Nichols Avenue; Suite 330; Centennial, Colorado 80112; United States
- Website: gammaphibeta.org

Gamma Phi Beta (ΓΦΒ, also known as GPhi, GPhiB, or Gamma Phi) is an international college sorority. It was founded in Syracuse University in 1874 and was the first of the Greek organizations to call itself a sorority. The term "sorority" was coined for Gamma Phi Beta by Dr. Frank Smalley, a professor at Syracuse University.

The sorority's international headquarters are located in Centennial, Colorado. As of 2023, Gamma Phi Beta listed more than 246,000 initiated members, 137 active collegiate chapters, 190 chartered collegiate chapters, and more than 155 alumnae groups in the United States and Canada.

== History ==
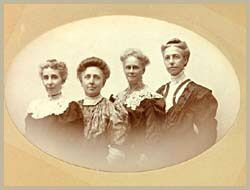
The four founders of Gamma Phi Beta

=== Founders ===
Gamma Phi Beta Society was founded on November 11, 1874, at Syracuse University in Syracuse, New York, by Helen M. Dodge, Frances E. Haven, E. Adeline Curtis, and Mary A. Bingham. The founders had originally selected light blue as the official color but changed it in 1875 to brown and mode (dark and light brown). The society's first initiate, Clara Worden, joined in March 1875.

For its first several years, Gamma Phi Beta was simply known as a society; it had never used the term fraternity. It was the first of the national women's organizations to adopt the word "sorority", coined in 1882 on behalf of the Syracuse chapter by one of the Latin professors on the faculty, Dr. Frank Smalley. From 1882 on, the organization was known as Gamma Phi Beta Sorority.

Gamma Phi Beta is a member of the Syracuse Triad, the name given to the three women's sororities founded at Syracuse University. Alpha Phi was founded first in 1872 by 10 of the original 20 women admitted to Syracuse University. Gamma Phi Beta came along two years later in 1874, and Alpha Gamma Delta completed the triad in 1904. Syracuse Triad ceremonies or events are held on most campuses with chapters of all three groups.

=== Later history ===
The sorority's second chapter, the Beta chapter at the University of Michigan, was chartered in 1882 and was followed in 1885 by the Gamma chapter at University of Wisconsin. Over the next ten years, the sorority expanded into the Midwest and into eastern schools. In 1894, Gamma Phi Beta expanded to the West Coast at the University of California and to Washington, Oregon, and Idaho.

Gamma Phi Beta's first convention was held in Syracuse in 1883, followed by annual sessions held until 1907. After that year, conventions became biennial, offset by a Leadership Training School held in the off-convention years. In 1891, Gamma Phi Beta joined the National Panhellenic Conference (NPC) as a founding member.

By 1907, Gamma Phi Beta had initiated more than 1,200 chapters with twelve collegiate chapters and six alumni chapters. Haven assisted with establishing the Omicron chapter at the University of Illinois in Champaign, Illinois in 1913. Omicron is the only other chapter established by one of the founders. In 1919, the establishment of the Alpha Alpha chapter at the University of Toronto in Toronto, Canada, made the sorority international.

== Symbols ==
The motto of the Gamma Phi Beta is "Founded on a Rock". Its symbol is the crescent moon. The carnation was named the official flower of the sorority at its convention in 1888, while pink was designated the official color of the carnation in 1950.

The sorority's crest was designed by Gertrude Comfort Morrow at University of California, Berkeley in 1913. Morrow's design was adopted after it won a national competition following the 1915 Convention. The crest, or coat of arms, is in the shape of a shield featuring three pink carnations on a white background, an open book on a light brown background, and a waxing crescent moon on a dark brown background. At the top of the shield is a golden oil lamp, and at the bottom of the shield is a banner displaying the Greek letters "ΓΦΒ". In 1965, the use of color was officially included in the crest.

The official colors of Gamma Phi Beta are pink and shades of brown. At first, designated by "Brown and Mode", the brown color was to honor Dr. John J. Brown's role at the sorority's founding, along with 'mode', which was meant to be used as a stylish and complementary color. In 2006, an extensive rebranding effort adopted updates to several of the symbols used, along with the society's colors. The "primary palette" of "Blush" (pink) and "A-la-Mode" (brown/gray) is explained, "To modernize our meaningful colors, we lightened the pink to blush and combined light brown with warm gray, creating a shade we call A-La-Mode. The updated colors exude femininity and strength; they are timeless and confident like our membership." Secondary colors were chosen and are listed as Once in A Blue Moon, Pearl, Brownstone, and Carnation.

The Gamma Phi Beta badge has not significantly changed since its design in 1874. It was designed by Tiffany & Co. and features a black crescent moon cradling the Greek letters Gamma, Phi, and Beta. Badges are currently produced by jeweler Herff Jones, with customization options such as a gold or silver finish or added jewels. The badges worn by International Council members are larger and feature white crescent moons instead of black. The international president's badge is set with diamonds on the Greek letters; other international officers' badges are set with pearls. In 1902, a triangular-shaped shield of dark brown, on which rests a crescent of gold, was approved as the badge for uninitiated new members.

Its publication is The Crescent, established in 1901. Playwright Lindsey Barbee was The Crescent's editor from 1910 to 1938.

== Activities ==
Gamma Phi Beta provided humanitarian supplies during both World War I and World War II. Chapters placed donation containers throughout the United States; the funds collected were directed to the French orphans at the end of World War I. In 1929, camping for girls was designated the official philanthropy of Gamma Phi Beta, leading to the support of Camp Fire and Girl Guides of Canada.

During World War II, the sorority raised funds that supported a mobile canteen for Great Britain, and contributions were raised for the American Red Cross, the Queen's Canadian Fund for air raid victims throughout Great Britain, and the Army and Navy Relief Societies. Its War bonds drive campaign resulted in four drives that raised $14 million, earning the sorority two U.S. Treasury citations for service rendered on behalf of the War Finance Program.

At the 2012 Convention, the sorority partnered with Girls on the Run. The current official philanthropy of Gamma Phi Beta is Building Strong Girls.

== Membership ==
Every initiated member has a lifelong membership in Gamma Phi Beta and may participate in alumnae activities on the local, regional, and international levels. Women who have never been initiated into a National Panhellenic Conference sorority may be eligible to join Gamma Phi Beta through the alumnae initiate program. Once a woman is initiated into Gamma Phi Beta, she is no longer allowed to join any other National Panhellenic Conference sorority. One standard of membership is paying dues each semester during a member's college years and, once she graduates, paying yearly dues to International Headquarters.

== Chapter houses ==
Many Gamma Phi Beta chapters have on-campus housing for members. Housing may be run by the Gamma Phi Beta national organization or an alumna-run local Affiliated Housing Corporation. Several Gamma Phi Beta sorority houses are registered as historical homes, including:

- Gamma Phi Beta Sorority House at the University of Illinois at Urbana–Champaign in Urbana, Illinois
- Gamma Phi Beta Sorority House at the University of Oregon in Eugene, Oregon

== Chapters ==
As of 2023, Gamma Phi Beta has chartered 190 chapters and has 137 active collegiate chapters and more than 155 alumnae groups in the United States and Canada.

== Notable members ==
As of 2023, Gamma Phi Beta has initiated more than 246,000 members.

=== Academia ===
- Karen Holbrook (Gamma), chancellor, University of South Florida Sarasota–Manatee

=== Arts ===
- Birgitta Moran Farmer (Alpha), painter

=== Entertainment ===
- Kristin Chenoweth (Beta Omicron), Tony Award and Emmy Award-winning actress
- Meagan Holder (Delta Delta), actress, You Again and Bring It On: Fight to the Finish
- Heather McDonald (Beta Alpha), actress, comedian, writer, Chelsea Lately
- Elizabeth Pitcairn (Beta Alpha), concert violinist, plays the violin on which the Academy Award winning film, The Red Violin was based
- Bailey Hanks (Zeta Zeta), Broadway actress, Legally Blonde
- Susan Howard (Alpha Zeta), actress, Dallas
- Cloris Leachman (Epsilon), actress, Academy Award winner
- Kelli O'Hara (Beta Omicron), actress, Tony Award winner for The King and I
- Kelli McCarty (Beta Chi), actress, model, and Miss USA 1991
- Mary Beth Peil (Epsilon), Tony Award-nominated singer and actress, Dawson's Creek
- Hope Summers (Epsilon), actress, The Andy Griffith Show

=== Government ===
- Jocelyn Burdick (Epsilon), Governor of North Dakota appointed her to U.S. Senate seat held by her late husband in 1992
- Jennifer Dunn (Lambda), former U.S. Representative
- Lynn Morley Martin (Omicron), U.S. Secretary of Labor under President Bush

=== Military ===
- Jeannie Deakyne (Alpha Epsilon), Bronze Star Medal recipient for service in Iraq War

=== Media ===
- Carol Ryrie Brink (Xi), author, Caddie Woodlawn, and winner of the Newbery Medal in 1936
- Alex Flanagan (Alpha Epsilon), sports reporter, ESPN, NFL Network, and NBC Sports
- Marguerite Higgins (Eta), University of California, Berkeley professor and 1951 Pulitzer Prize recipient

=== Sports ===
- Caroline Casey (Alpha Chi), former soccer player, Sky Blue FC in Piscataway Township, New Jersey
- Brooke Raboutou (Epsilon Gamma), Olympic rock climber

== See also ==
- List of social sororities and women's fraternities
