= Jeannie Deakyne =

Jeannie Deakyne is an advocate for education and access, community builder, and combat veteran. As of 2020, she serves as the vice president of operations for the National Medal of Honor Museum Foundation in Arlington, Texas. She is an active member in the National and Texas Societies of the Daughters of the American Revolution, alumna of the Gamma Phi Beta sorority, and Arlington Council of PTAs leader.

== Early life and education ==
Deakyne was raised in Arlington, Texas. She graduated from Arlington High School in 1993 and went on to graduate with a B.A. in political science from the University of Texas at Arlington in 1998. During her college career she served as the student body president, was a Distinguished Military Graduate, and was a member of Gamma Phi Beta. She earned her master's degree in political science from the University of Texas at Arlington in 2010.

== Career ==
Deakyne served as an active duty United States Army officer from 1998 to 2011. Her 12-year army career included two deployments with the First Cavalry Division in support of the Iraq War, service as the company commander for all army forces at the Baghdad International Airport, Chief Personnel Officer for the Division's Air Combat Brigade, and Operations Officer for the personnel, postal, and casualty operations unit for Iraq and Kuwait.

She also has served as the Assistant Professor of Military Science at the University of Texas at Arlington, leading the department's curriculum development and training while serving as the primary instructor for college freshmen in the Army's Reserve Officer Training Corp (ROTC). She earned the Army's Bronze Star Medal and Combat Action Badge while deployed in support of Operation Iraqi Freedom.

Deakyne later served as the university's Manager of Staff and Faculty Learning and Development, eventually setting the stage for her move to Texas Christian University's Neeley School of Business and as the Director of TCU Neeley Executive Education.

Deakyne began serving, as the Vice President of Operations for the National Medal of Honor Museum Foundation in 2020.

She served as the co-chair of the Arlington Independent School District 2019 Capital Needs Steering Committee, member of the 2014 Capital Needs Steering Committee, chair of the 2009 Citizens Bond Oversight Committee, and multiple terms on the district's Financial Futures Committee.

Her additional current and past board and community service includes: Governance Committee for the Association of Junior Leagues International, National Vice Chair of Junior Membership (Classroom Grants) for the Daughters of the American Revolution, Vice President of Leadership for the Texas Parent Teacher Association, President of the Arlington Council of PTAs, President of the C.C. Duff Elementary PTA, President of the Junior League of Arlington, Regent of the Quanah Parker Chapter of DAR, City of Arlington Zoning Board of Adjustment, board member of the Arlington Convention and Visitors Bureau, board member of the Greater Arlington Chamber of Commerce, board member of the Veterans Business Council, and member of the Women's Alliance Advisory Council.

Deakyne is also a member of the Junior League of Arlington, Texas.
