= Lindsey Barbee =

American playwright (1876–1951)

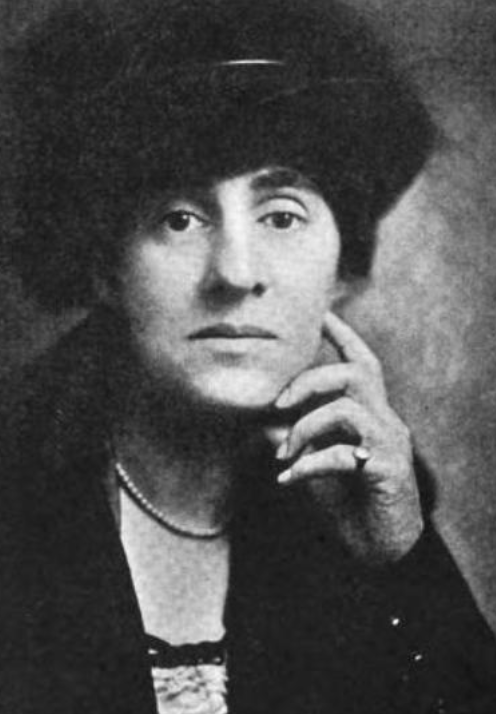
- Lindsey Barbee, from a 1921 publication
- Born: Mary Lindsey Barbee; May 8, 1876; Danville, Kentucky, U.S.
- Died: April 8, 1951 (aged 74); Denver, Colorado, U.S.
- Occupations: Playwright, editor, clubwoman

Mary Lindsey Barbee (May 8, 1876 – April 8, 1951) was an American playwright, editor and clubwoman, based in Denver, Colorado. She was national president of Gamma Phi Beta from 1919 to 1924, and edited the sorority's national publication from 1910 to 1938.

== Biography ==
Barbee was born in Danville, Kentucky, the daughter of James Walter Barbee and Mary Eliza Sandifer Barbee. She graduated from the University of Denver in 1897.

Barbee was Grand President of Gamma Phi Beta from 1919 to 1924, director of public relations from 1924 to 1927, and historian from 1924 to 1930. She was also editor of the sorority's national publication, The Crescent, from 1910 to 1938.

Barbee died in 1951, in Denver, at the age of 74. Gamma Phi Beta named a biennial fellowship after Barbee.

== Works ==
Cover of Let's pretend; a book of children's plays (1917), by Lindsey Barbee

Barbee was a prolific playwright, writing mostly comedies and dramas for school and community use. (Unless otherwise noted, all titles below represent plays.)

- At the End of the Rainbow (1910)
- A Prince of Adventure (1911)
- The Fifteenth of January (1911)
- The Dream that Came True (1913)
- In the College Days (1914, monologues)
- The Thread of Destiny (1914)
- A Trial of Hearts (1915)
- Tomorrow at Ten (1916)
- Sing a Song of Seniors (1915)
- All on a Summer's Day (1916)
- By Way of the Secret Passage (1916)
- Let's Pretend: A Book of Children's Plays (1917, collected plays)
- The Whole Truth (1917)
- A Watch, a Wallet, and a Jack of Spades (1917)
- The Spell of the Image (1917)
- Her First Scoop (1917)
- The Call of Wohelo (1917)
- In the Forest of the Day (1918)
- Patty Saves the Day (1918)
- The Call of the Colors (1918)
- All for the Cause (1918)
- When the Homeland Calls (1918)
- The Camouflage of Shirley (1918)
- Ruth in a Rush (1919)
- The Real Thing After All (1919)
- Out of the Stillness (1920)
- Sally Ann Finds Herself (1920)
- How Beth Won the Camp Fire Honor (1920)
- The Story of Gamma Phi Beta (1921, history)
- When the Clock Strikes Twelve (1921)
- The Empty House (1921)
- What Happened at Brent's (1921)
- Comrades Courageous (1921)
- Cinderella and Five Other Fairy Plays (1922)
- Contents Unknown (1922)
- How Many Marys Have We Here?" (1922)
- The Luck of Derryveraugh (1924)
- The Unexpectedness of Catherine Henry (1924)
- Tea Toper Tavern (1925)
- Beggars Can't Be Choosers (1925)
- The Palace of Every Day (1926)
- Mystery Island (1927)
- His Best Investment (1927)
- The Making of a King (1928)
- The Mystery of the Third Gable (1930)
- In the Light of the Moon (1936)
- The Last of the Ruthvens (1936)
- Phantom from the Sea (1939)
