= Indigo Children (film) =

- Directed by: Eric Chaney
- Written by: Eric Chaney
- Produced by: Eric Chaney
- Starring: Robert Olsen; Isabelle McNally; Christine Donlon
- Cinematography: Jay Hufford
- Edited by: Eric Chaney
- Music by: Jesse Lee Herdma
- Release dates: October 6, 2012 (Gotham Screen International Film Festival); January 17, 2014 (United States)
- Running time: 75 minutes
- Country: United States
- Language: English

Indigo Children is a 2012 American drama film about the romance between two teenagers based on the concept of the existence of indigo children, who allegedly possess special faculties. Directed by Eric Chaney, this film was inspired by the first girl he ever loved.

== Cast ==
- Robert Olsen as Mark
- Isabelle McNally as Christina
- Christine Donlon as Jenny

== Plot summary ==
The movie shows a relationship of two teenagers in suburban New Jersey, who over the duration of summer develop their romance and explore their alleged cryptic psychic abilities.

== Awards ==
The film won the Best of Show, feature film at the Accolade Global Film Competition 2012.
