= Isabelle McNally =

American actress

Isabelle McNally (born 2 March 1989) is an American actress. She portrayed Madeline Loomis in the television series Bates Motel (2017). She has appeared in such films as Frances Ha (2012) and Indigo Children (2012).

== Early life ==
McNally was born to parents Keith McNally and Lynn Wagenknecht and her siblings are Sophie and Harry. She grew up in Greenwich Village.

== Personal life ==
It was reported in January 2014 that McNally was then romantically linked with Jonah Hill.

== Filmography ==
=== Film ===
Year	Title	Role	Notes
2009	Runaround	Jay	Short film
2009	Passing Strangers	Karina	Short film
2010	Struck	Rebecca	
2011	Happy Life	Mandy	
2011	The Wrong Ferarri	Unknown	
2012	Not Waving but Drowning	Kim	
2012	Frances Ha	Random Girl #1	
2012	Greetings from Tim Buckley	Jane Goldstein	
2012	Indigo Children	Christina	
2012	Amnesia	Andie	
2012	Random Acts of Violence	Opening Victim	
2013	The Disappearance of Eleanor Rigby	Dine & Ditch Girl	
2014	Before I Disappear	Vista	
2014	Loitering with Intent	Ava	
2015	In a Relationship	Clara	Short film
2016	The Big Spoon	Elise	
2018	The Song of Sway Lake	Isadora	
2018	The Big Break	Grace Barnett	Short film

=== Television ===
Year	Title	Role	Notes
2012	The Corrections	Emily	TV movie
2014	House of Cards	Kendra Lee	4 episodes
2014	The Money	Mindy	TV movie
2017	Bates Motel	Madeleine Loomis	9 episodes
2017	Strangers	Hailey	3 episodes
2023	Top Boy	Elisha	1 episode
