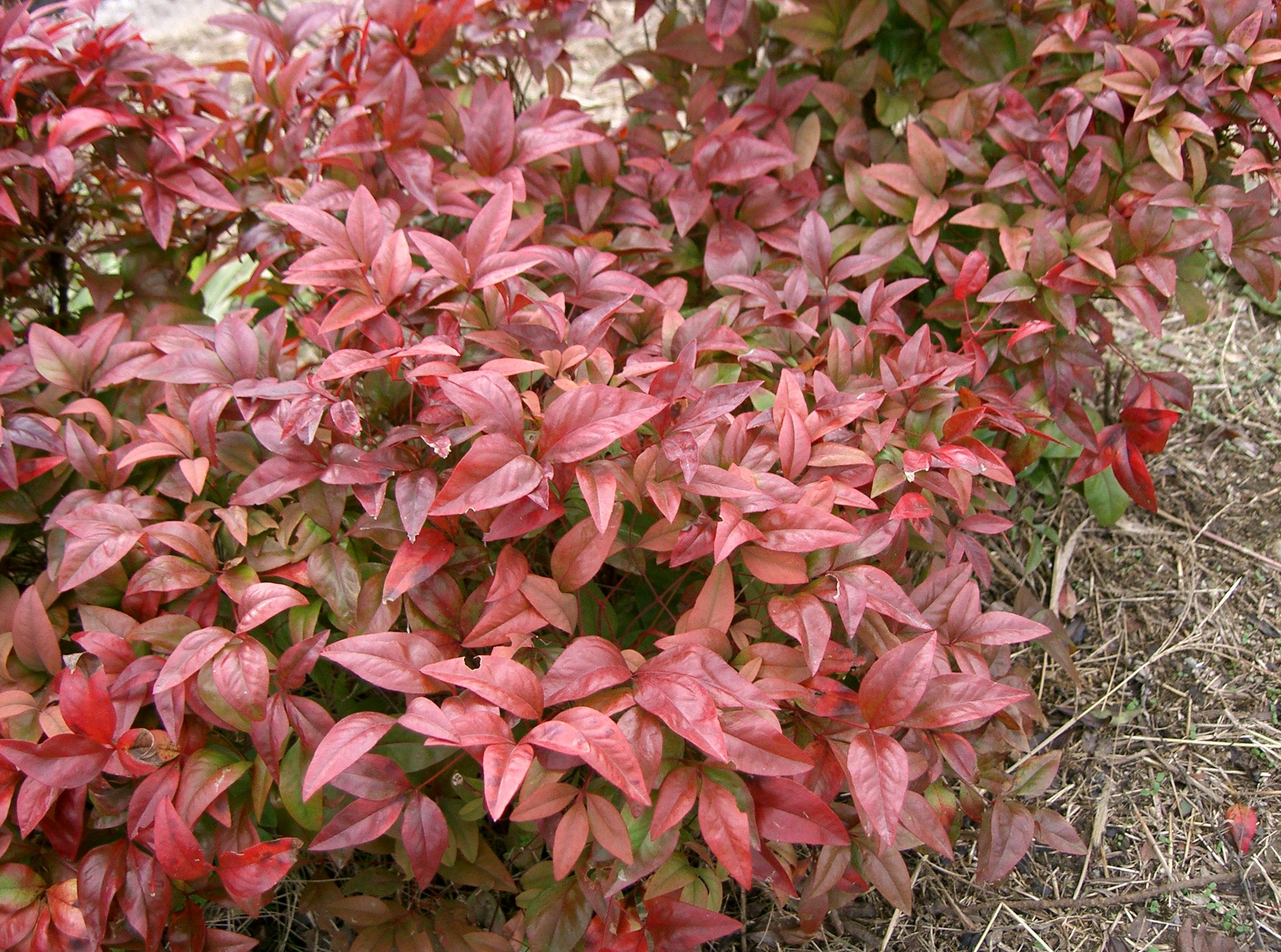

Scientific classification
- Kingdom: Plantae
- Clade: Tracheophytes
- Clade: Angiosperms
- Clade: Eudicots
- Order: Ranunculales
- Family: Berberidaceae
- Genus: Nandina; Thunb.
- Species: N. domestica

Binomial name
- Nandina domestica Thunb.

= Nandina =

Nandina domestica

Genus of flowering plants belonging to the barberry family

Nandina domestica (/nænˈdiːnə/ nan-DEE-nə) (Note: (or nan-DEE-nuh) Sunset Western Garden Book, 1995:606–607) (Note: Oxford English Dictionary.) (Note: The unexpected pronunciation /iː/ approximates the Japanese nanten.) commonly known as nandina, heavenly bamboo or sacred bamboo, is a species of flowering plant in the family Berberidaceae, native to eastern Asia from the Himalayas to Japan. It is the only member of the monotypic genus Nandina. Despite its name, it is not a true bamboo.

Nandina is widely grown in gardens as an ornamental plant with a number of cultivars that display bright-red fall foliage in the cool months, and attractive new foliage growth in spring. Although a popular ornamental shrub, the berries are toxic to birds, especially towards the end of the winter when other food sources become scarce.

== Etymology ==
The Latin genus name Nandina is derived from the Japanese name nanten (南天), which itself is derived from the Chinese name nantian zhu (南天竹), meaning "southern heavenly bamboo". The specific epithet domestica means 'domesticated', or 'of the household'.

== Description ==
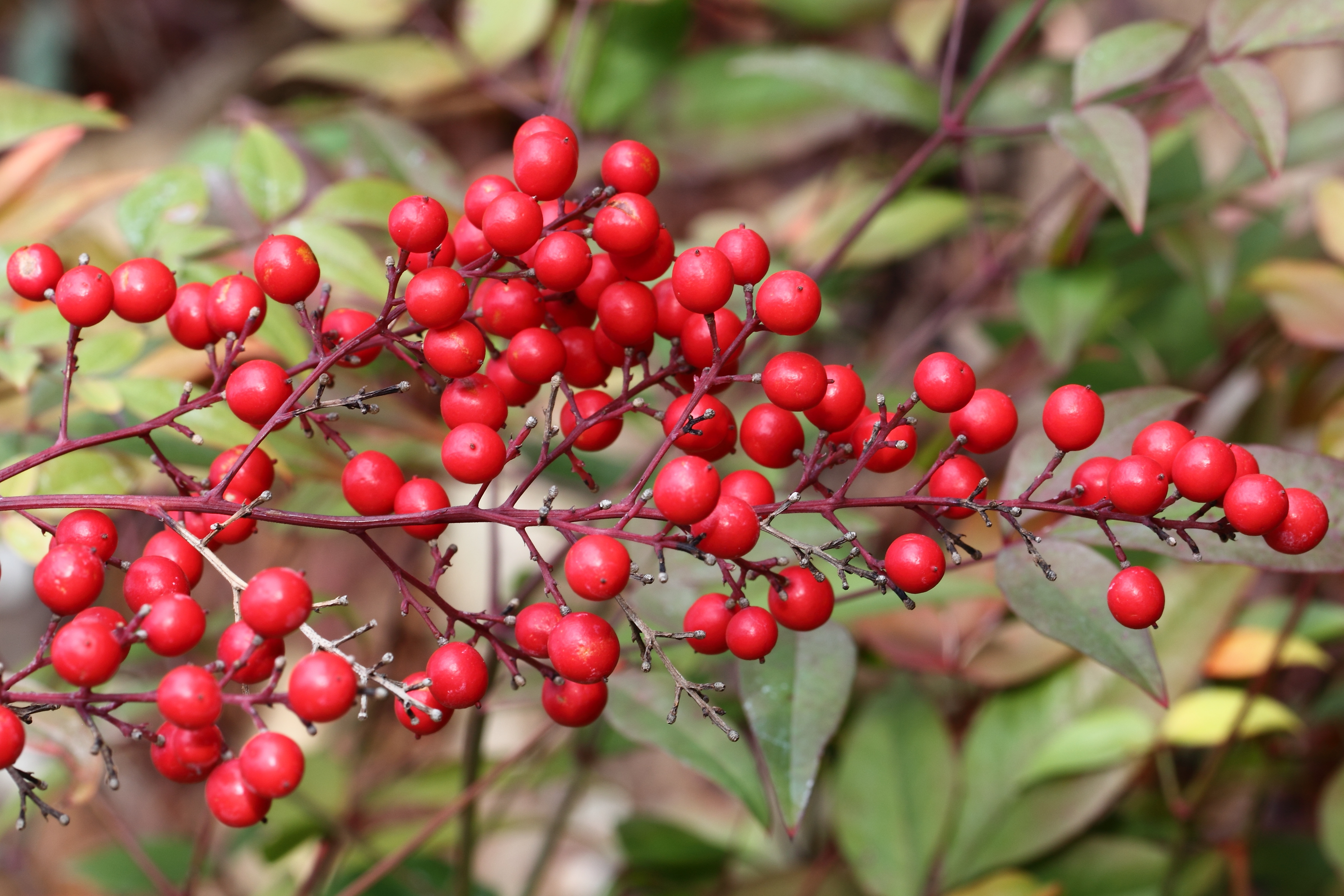

Despite the common name "sacred bamboo", it is not a bamboo but an erect evergreen shrub up to 2 m (7 ft) tall by 1.5 m (5 ft) wide, with numerous, usually unbranched stems growing from ground level. The glossy leaves are sometimes deciduous in colder areas, 50–100 cm (20–39 in) long, bi- or tri-pinnately compound, with the individual leaflets 4–11 cm (2–4 in) long and 1.5–3 cm broad.

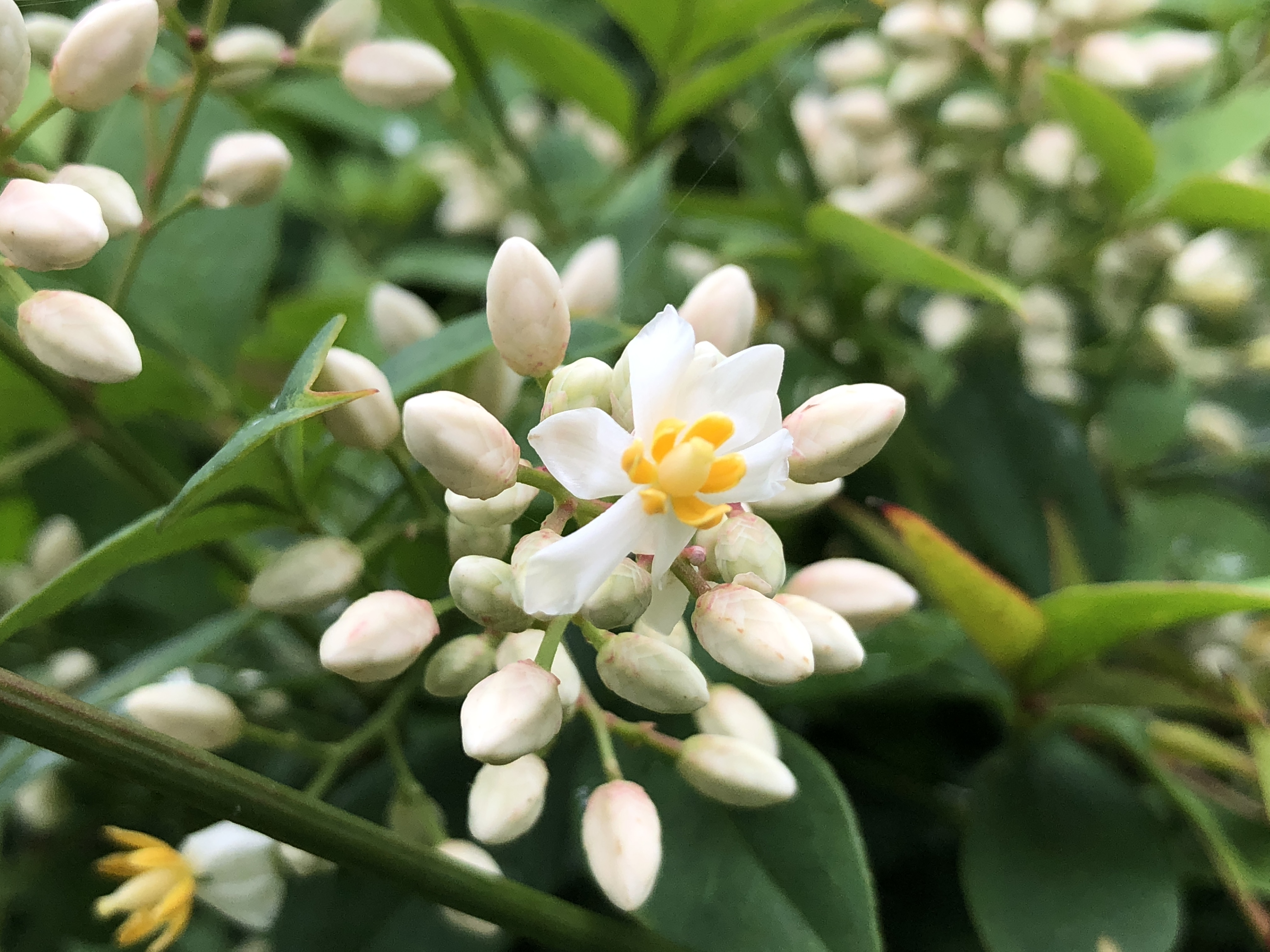
Flowers

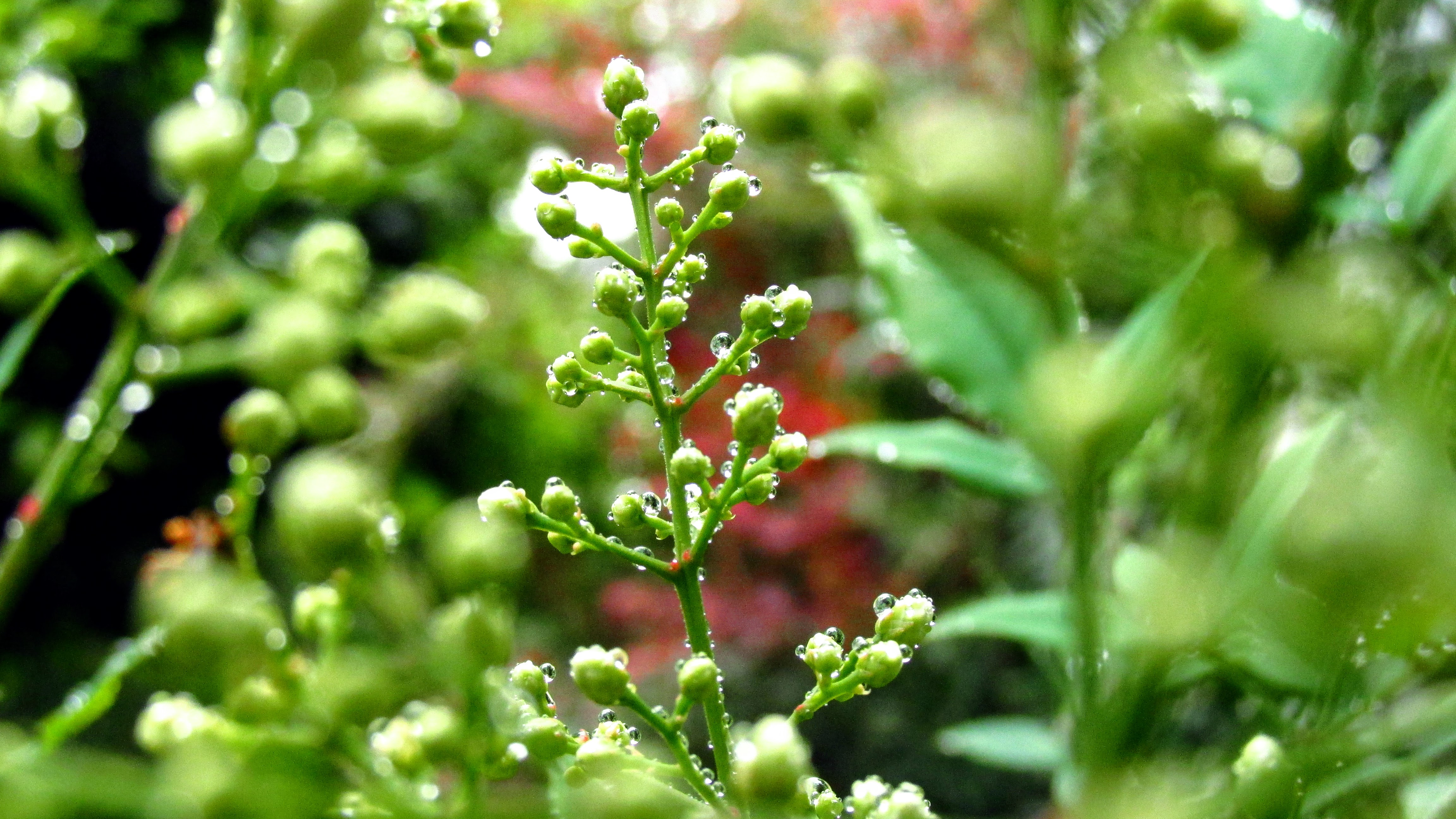
Flower buds repel rainwater

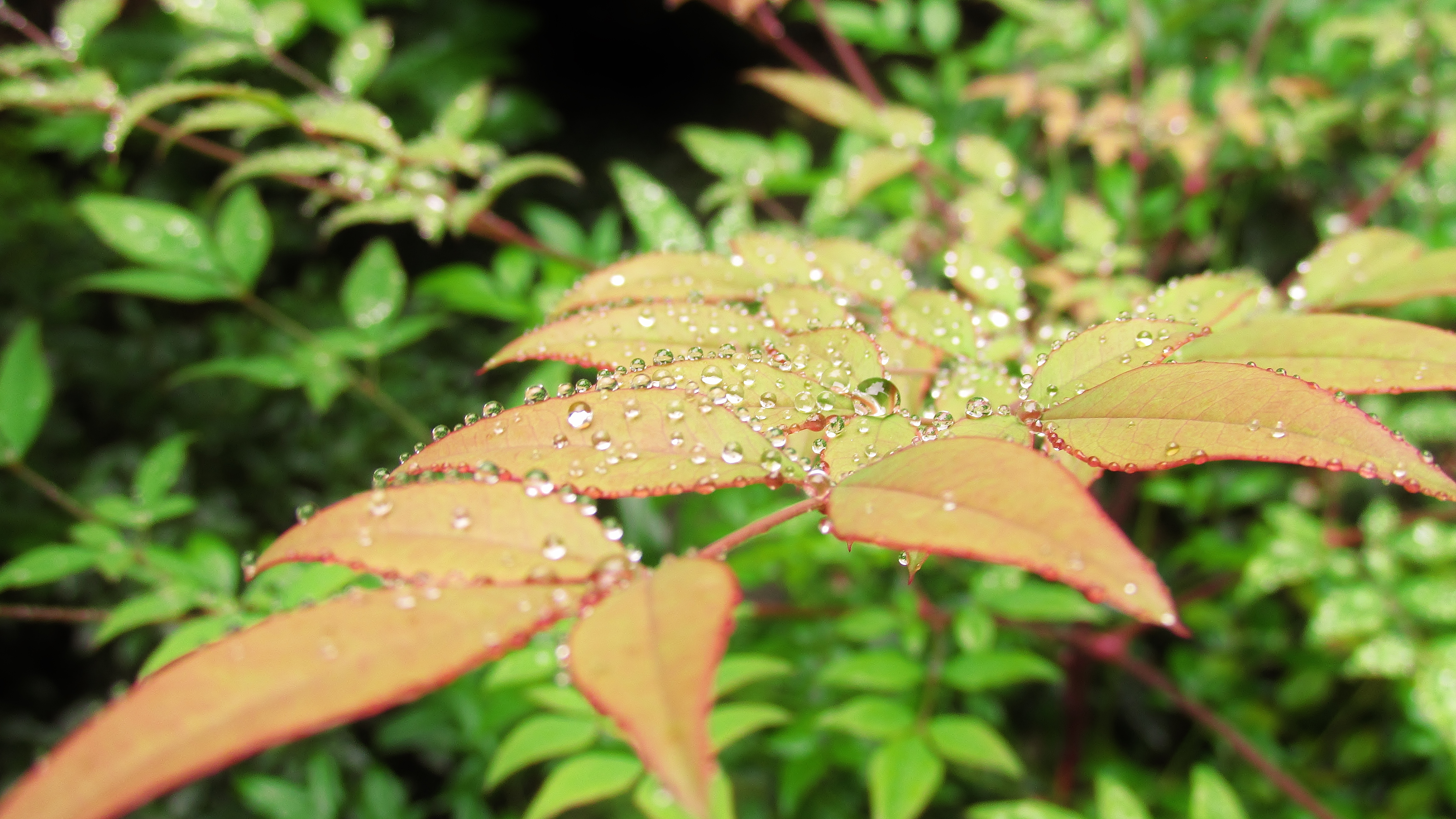
Nanten leaves also repel rainwater

The young leaves in spring are brightly coloured pink to red before turning green; old leaves turn red or purple again before falling. Its petiolate leaves are 50–100 cm long, compound (two or three pinnacles) with leaflets, elliptical to ovate or lanceolate and of entire margins, 2–10 cm long by 0.5–2 cm wide, with petioles swollen at their bases.

The inflorescences are axillary or terminally erect panicles with numerous hermaphrodite flowers. There are several ovate-oblong sepals of a pinkish white color, and six oblong white petals, each 4 by 2.5 mm. The flowers are borne in early summer in conical clusters held well above the foliage. The fruit is a bright red berry, 5–10 mm diameter, ripening in late autumn and often persisting through the winter.

== Garden history and cultivation ==
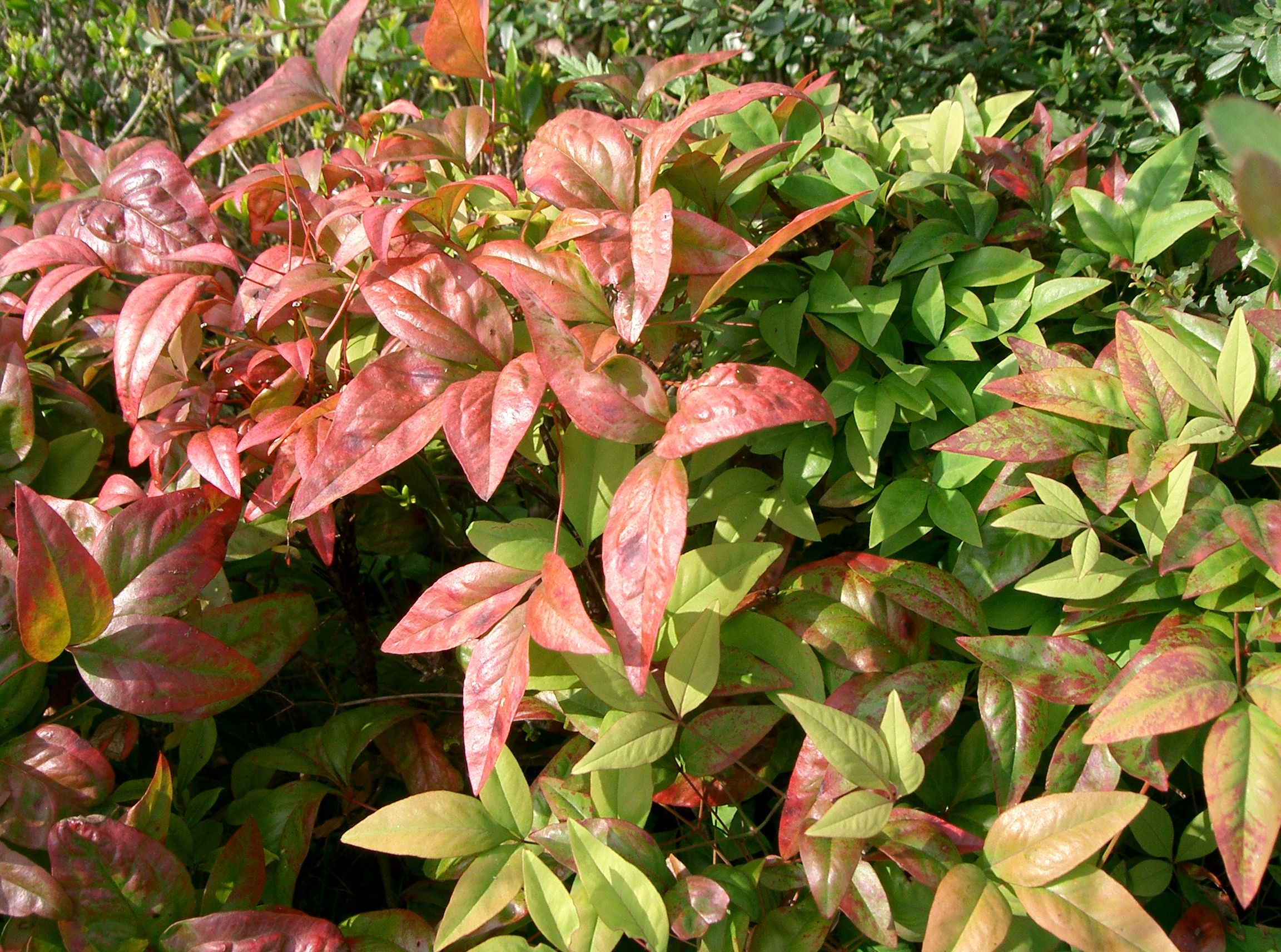
Leaves changing colour with season

Dwarf cultivar

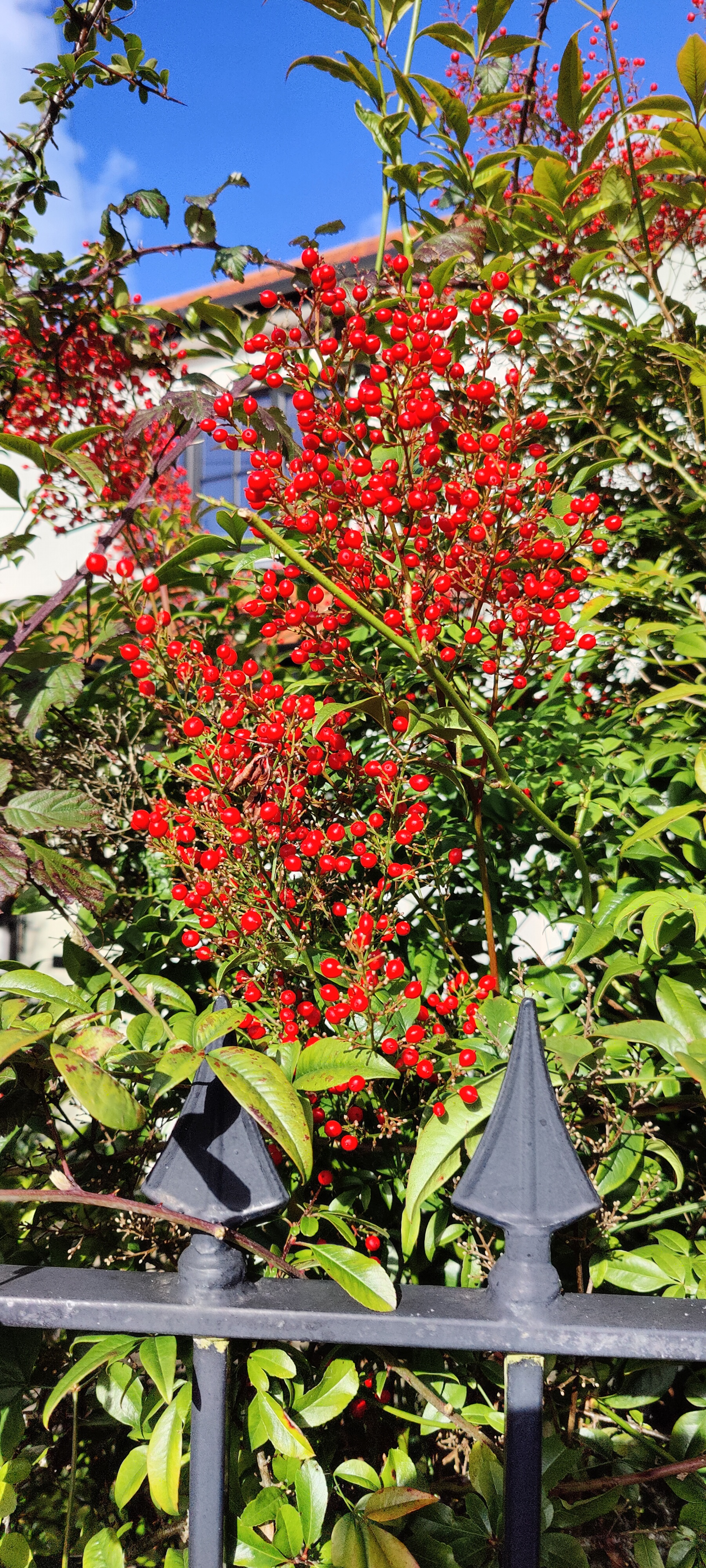
Berries

N. domestica has been grown in Chinese and Japanese gardens for centuries. In China, it was noted in the Kaibao Bencao (開寶本草), a Song dynasty materia medica published in 973 CE. In Japan, it was mentioned by Fujiwara no Teika in his diary, the Meigetsuki (1230 CE), where he described it being planted in the imperial garden.

The plant was brought to Western gardens by William Kerr, who sent it to London in his first consignment from Canton, in 1804. English breeders, unsure of its hardiness, kept it in greenhouses at first. The scientific name given to it by Carl Peter Thunberg is a Latinized version of a Japanese name for the plant, nan-ten. Over 65 cultivars have been named in Japan, where the species is particularly popular and a national Nandina society exists. In Shanghai berried sprays of nandina are sold in the streets at New Year, for the decoration of house altars and temples.

Nandina does not berry profusely in Great Britain, but it can be grown in USDA hardiness zones 6–10 with some cultivars hardy into zone 5. Nandina can take heat and cold, from −10 to 110 °F (−23 to 43 °C). It generally needs no pruning, but can spread via underground runners and can be difficult to remove.

Nandina is extremely toxic to birds and mammals. Spent berry stalks can easily be snapped off by hand in spring. Due to the naturally occurring phytochemicals (see above) this plant is commonly used in rabbit, deer, and javelina resistant landscape plantings.

=== Cultivars ===
These are some of the popular cultivars of this plant:

- Blush – Slightly smaller than the above, it produces red new growth in spring and autumn, and in winter months it turns vivid red.
- Fire Power – Height of 2 to 2 1/2 feet tall, is so-named for its impressive red fall and winter foliage.
- Gulfstream – Reaching 3 feet wide and 3 to 3 1/2 feet tall, it features narrow, diamond-shaped leaves which are orange-tinted and coppery when young that develop to turquoise in summer, then turn orange-red in fall.
- Lemon Lime – Yellowish green spring foliage that transforms to chartreuse in summer.
- Moon Bay – Dense and upright reaching 1m, its diamond-shaped leaves (which are similar to Gulfstream) change seasonally from lime green, red, apricot and burgundy. (Note: Nandina Moon Bay 14cm)
- Moyer's Red – A semi dwarf type that grows 4 to 6 feet tall that features light-pink flowers. (Note: Nandina domestica 'Moyer's Red')
- Nana – A dwarf variety suited for a low hedge, it features foliage that turns into lime green to crimson red and scarlet-bronze tones in the cooler months. (Note: Nandina Nana)
- Obsession – Related to the above, it grows 2 to 2 1/2 feet tall and wide and features scarlet spring and fall foliage.
- Richmond – 1–1.5 metres tall. In summer, it bears panicles of white flowers followed by bright-red berries in winter.
- Royal Princess – Reaching up to 8 feet tall, this displays blush-coloured blooms.
- Sienna Sunrise – Growing 3–4 feet tall, it features glaring red foliage with red highlights in fall.

== Toxicity ==
All parts of the plant are poisonous, containing compounds that decompose to produce hydrogen cyanide, and could be fatal if ingested. The plant is generally considered non-toxic to humans, but the berries are considered toxic to cats and grazing animals. Excessive consumption of the berries will kill birds such as cedar waxwings, because they are subject to cyanide toxicosis, resulting in death to multiple individuals at one time.

The berries also contain alkaloids such as nantenine, which is used in scientific research as an antidote to MDMA (ecstasy).

== Status as an invasive species ==
Nandina is considered invasive in Texas, North Carolina, Tennessee, Georgia, and Florida. It was placed on the Florida Exotic Pest Plant Council's invasive list as a Category I species, the highest listing. It has been observed in the wild in Florida in Gadsden, Leon, Jackson, Alachua and Citrus counties, in conservation areas, woodlands and floodplains. In general, the purchase or continued cultivation of non-sterile varieties in the southeastern United States is discouraged.

It is also becoming invasive in wild areas farther north, and in May 2017 was added to the Maryland invasive plant list with a tier 2 status.

Although grown extensively in Texas because of its tolerance for dry conditions, fruiting varieties of Nandina are considered invasive there. This is primarily due to birds spreading seeds into natural areas where Nandina proliferates and crowds out native species, both through seeding and by the growth of rhizomatous underground stems.

== In culture ==
Historically, nandina wood was carved into gourd-shaped charms and worn like a necklace by children to protect against whooping cough. It was also thought to prevent fires when planted in a garden. In Japan, nandina was planted next to washbasins as protection against evil.

== Gallery ==
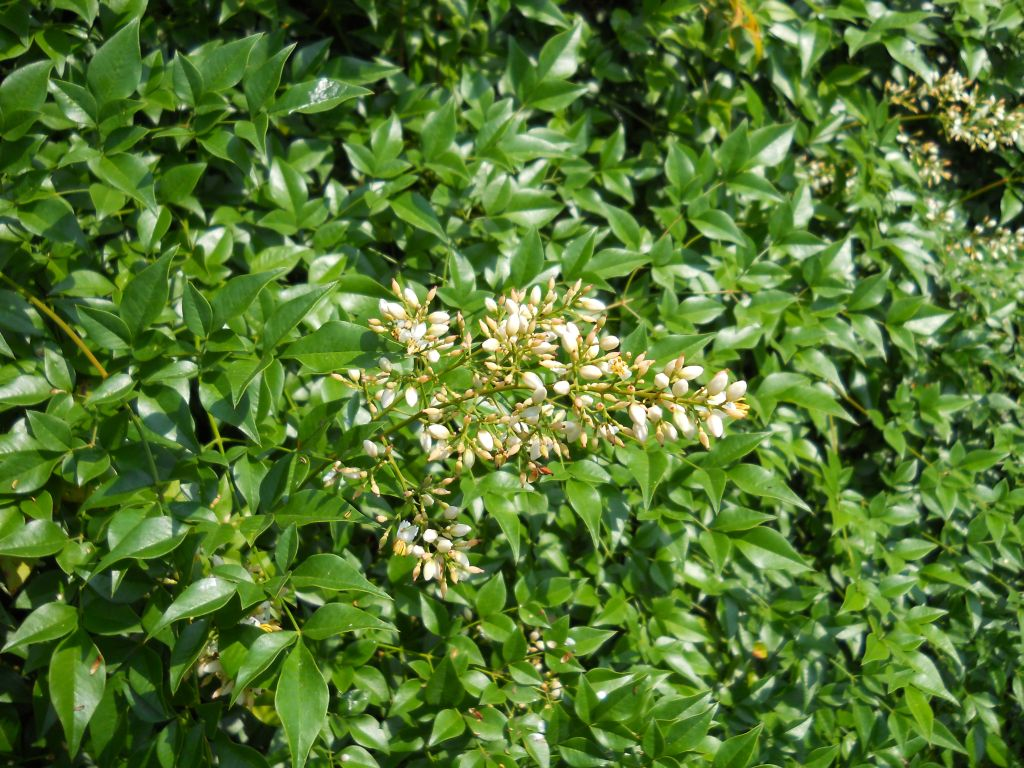
Flowers

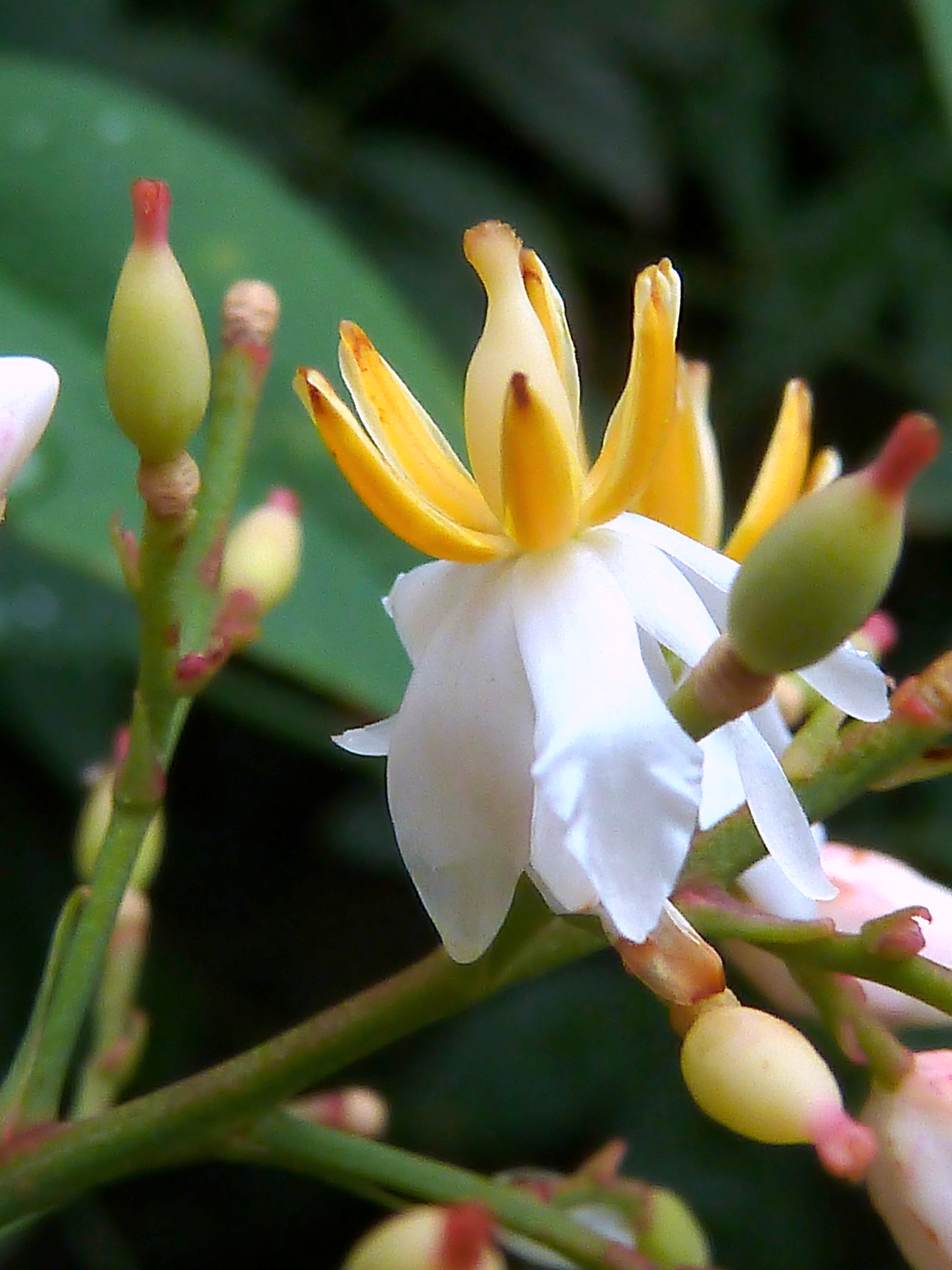
Flower

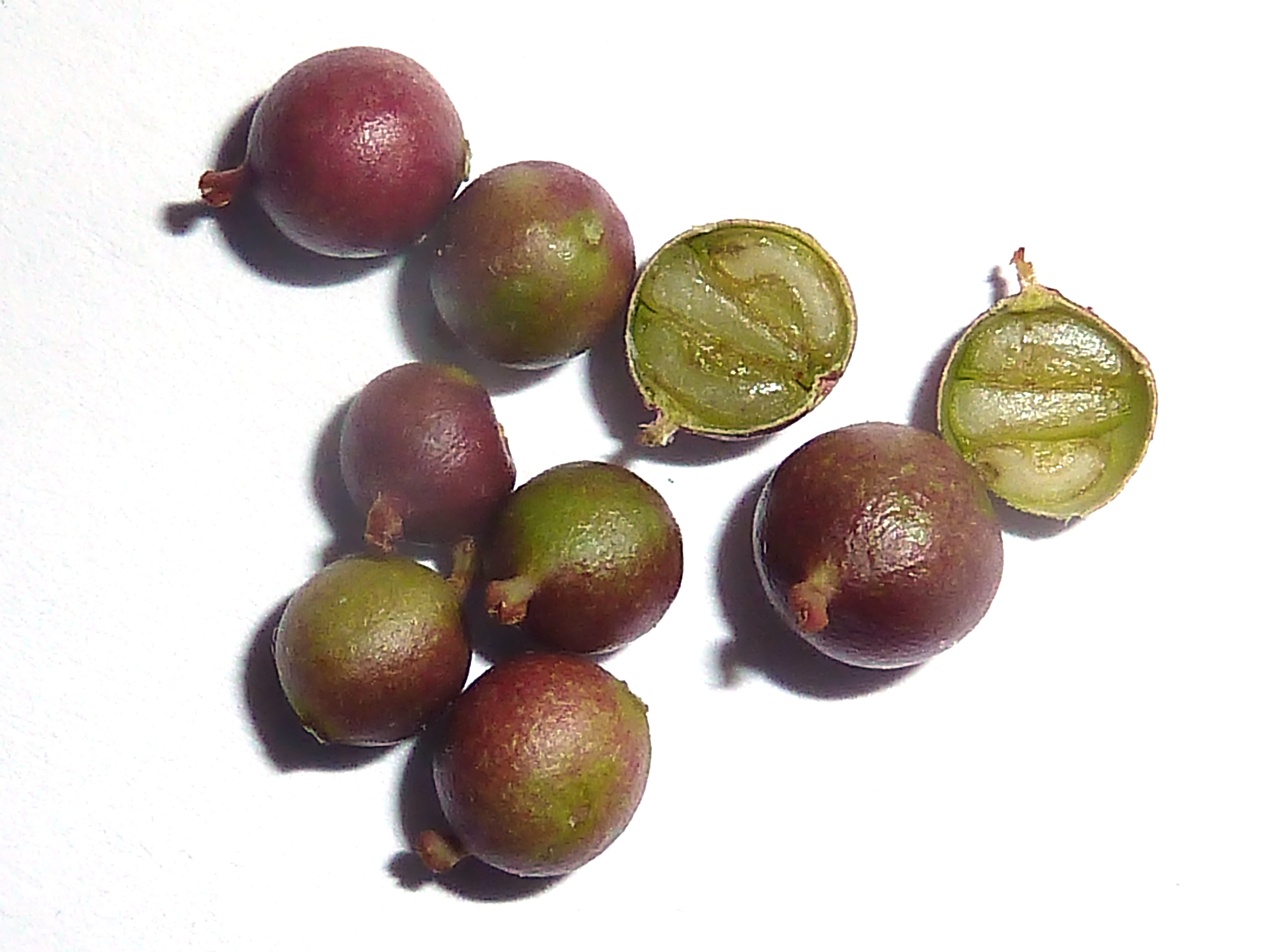
Fruits

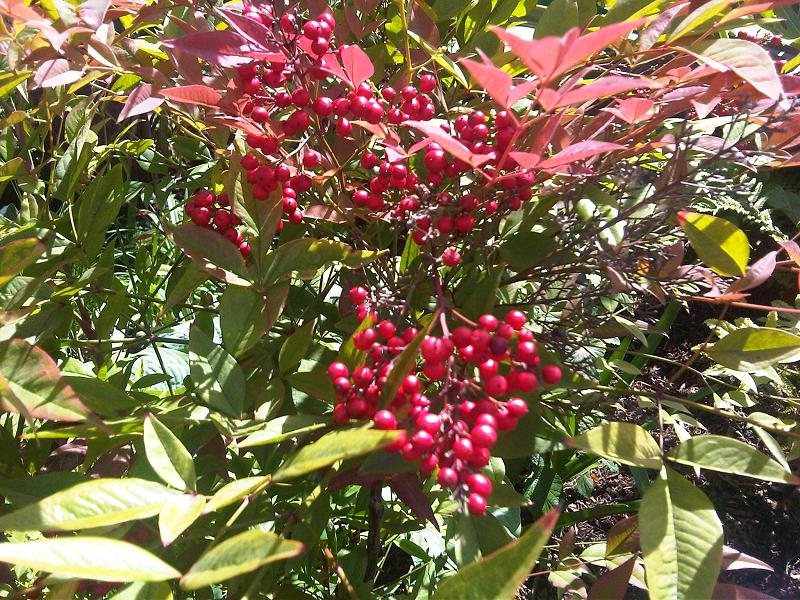
Fruiting shrub

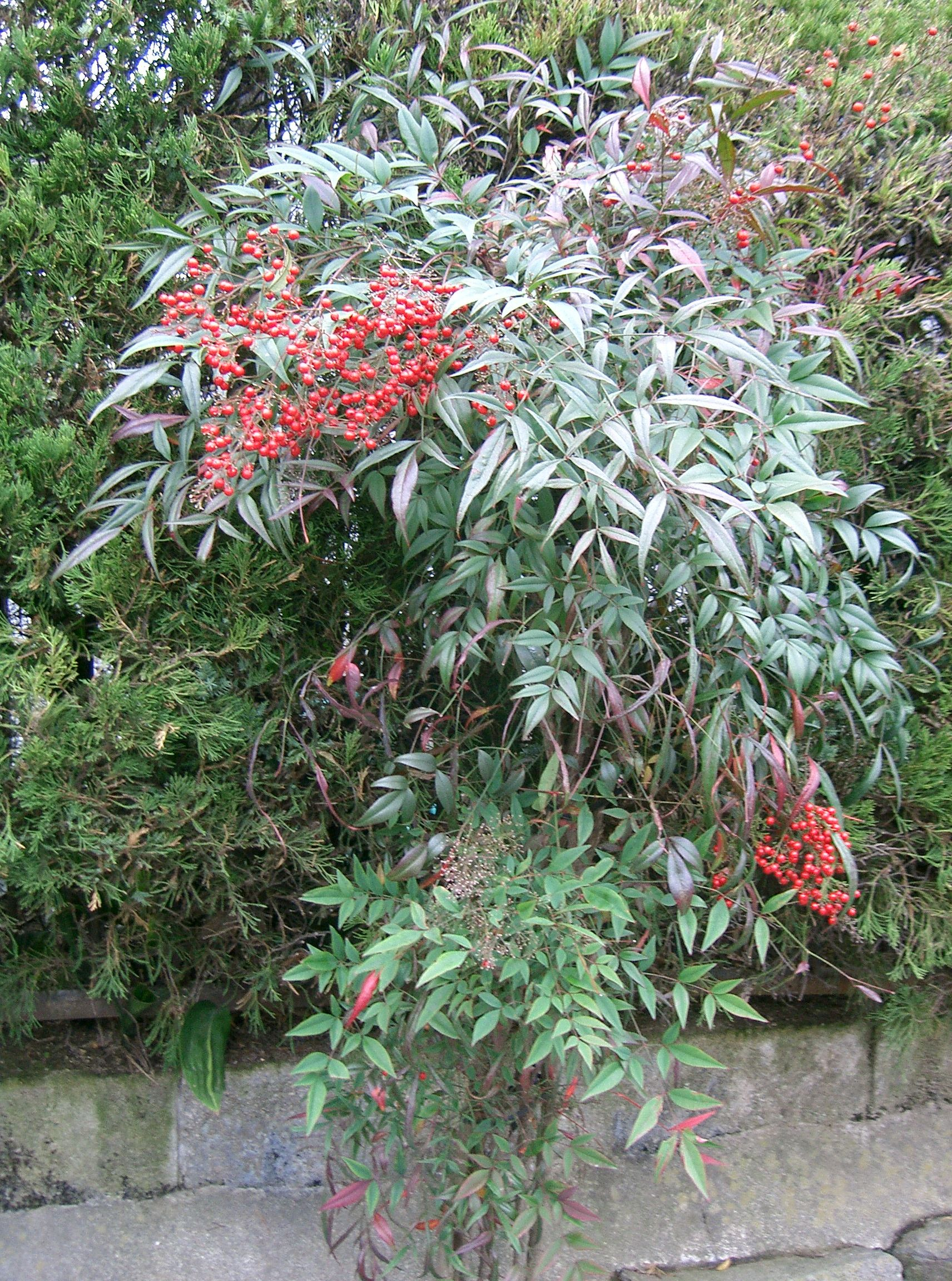

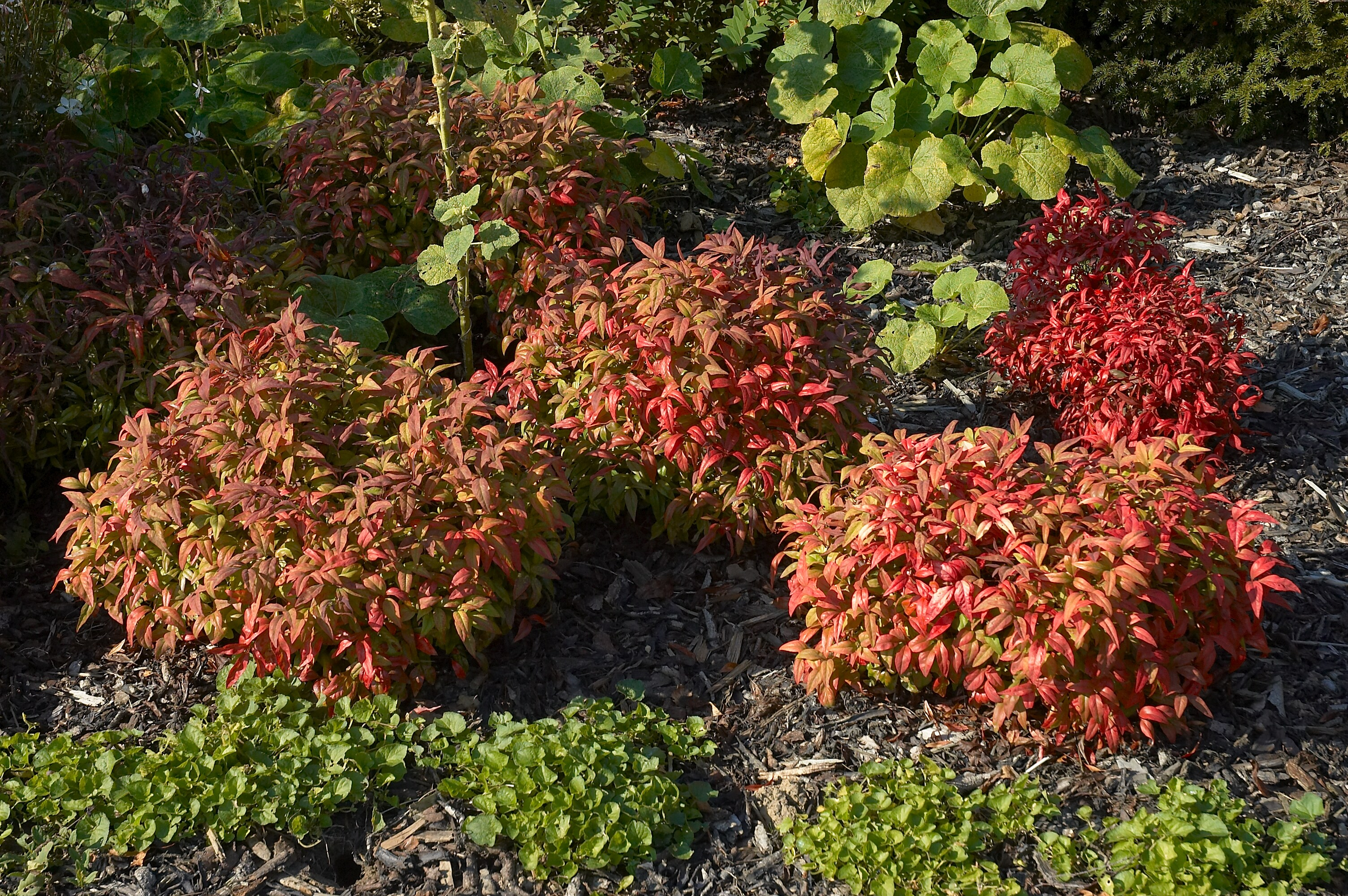
'Fire power' cultivar in a hedge setting

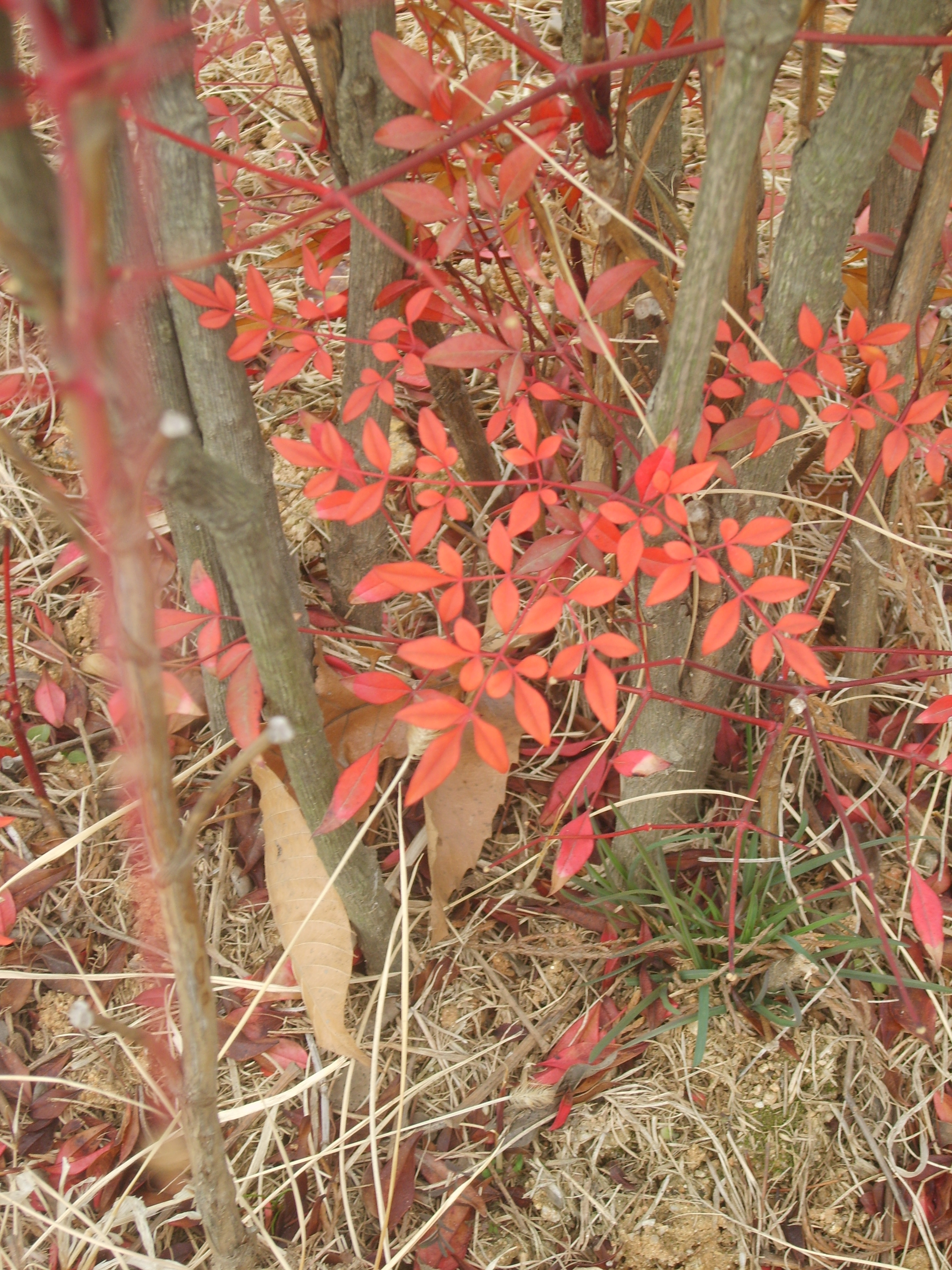
A cultivar in South Korea

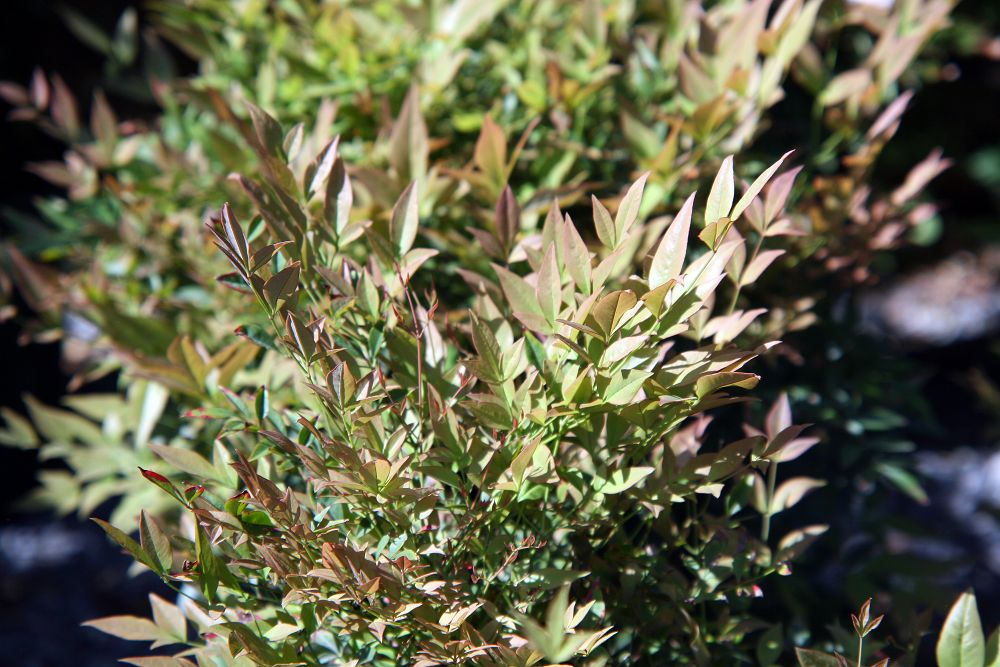
'Gulf Stream' cultivar with diamond-shaped leaflets

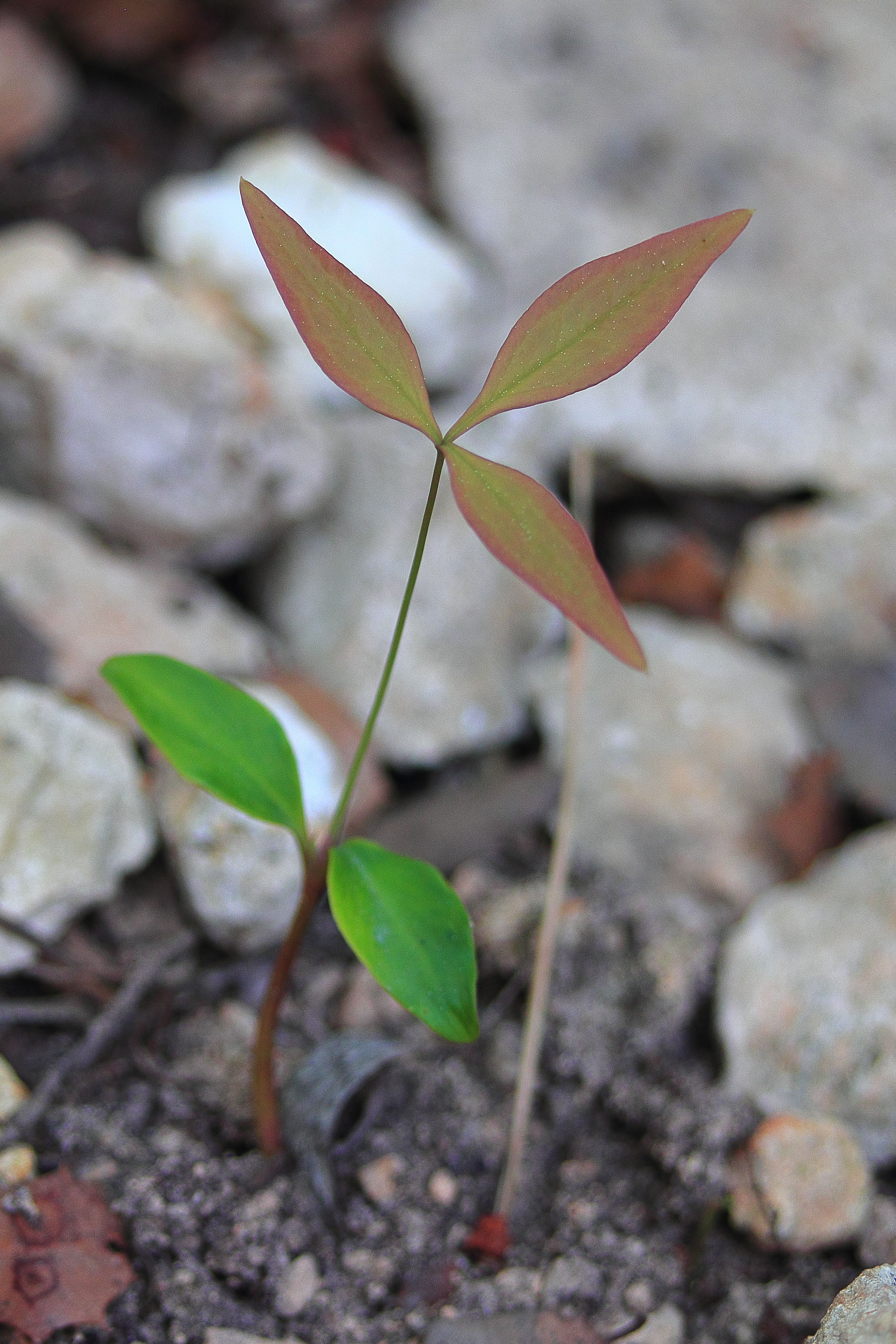
Seedling, with two green cotyledons, and a first red-green leaf

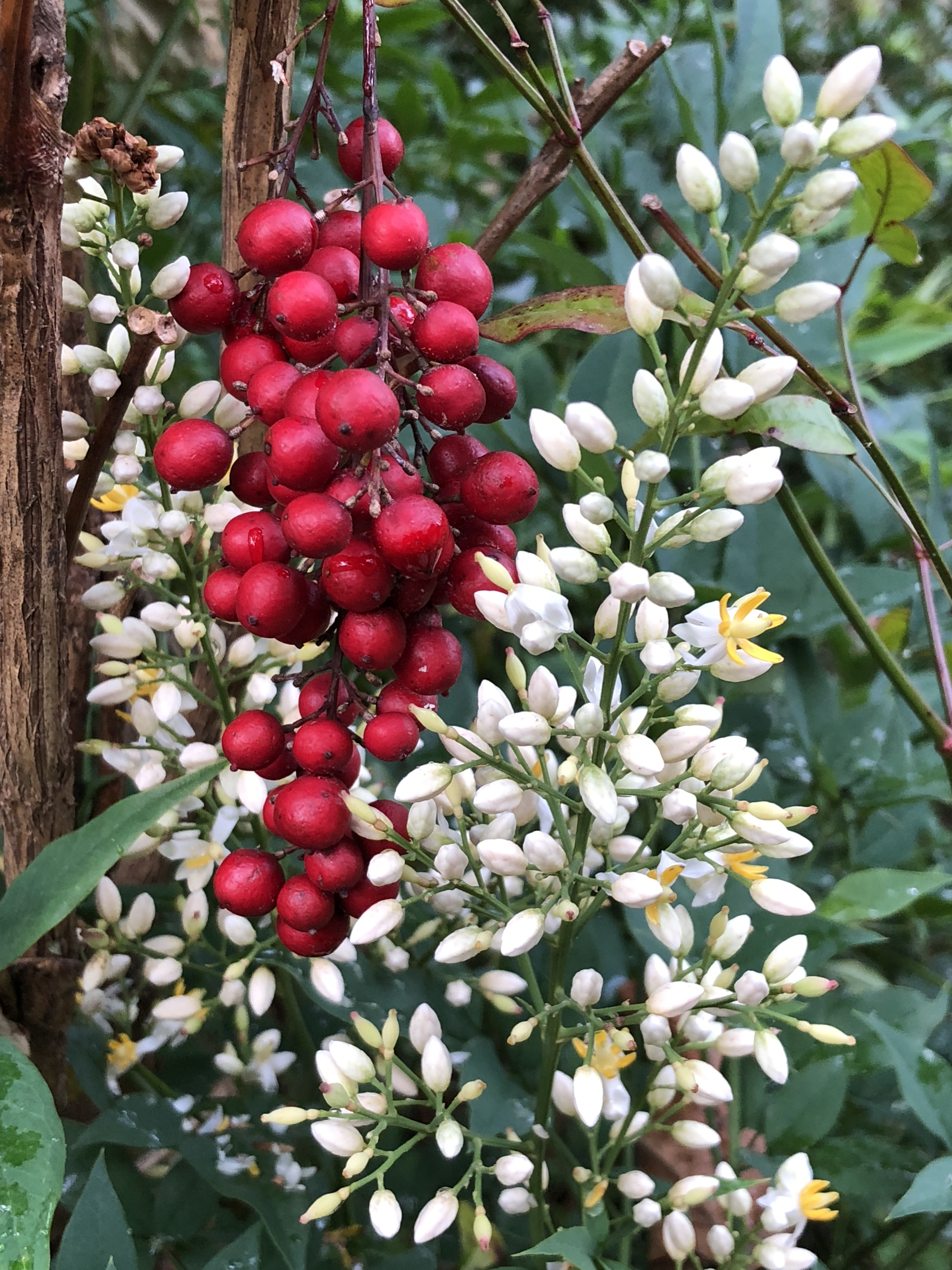
Flowers and fruit

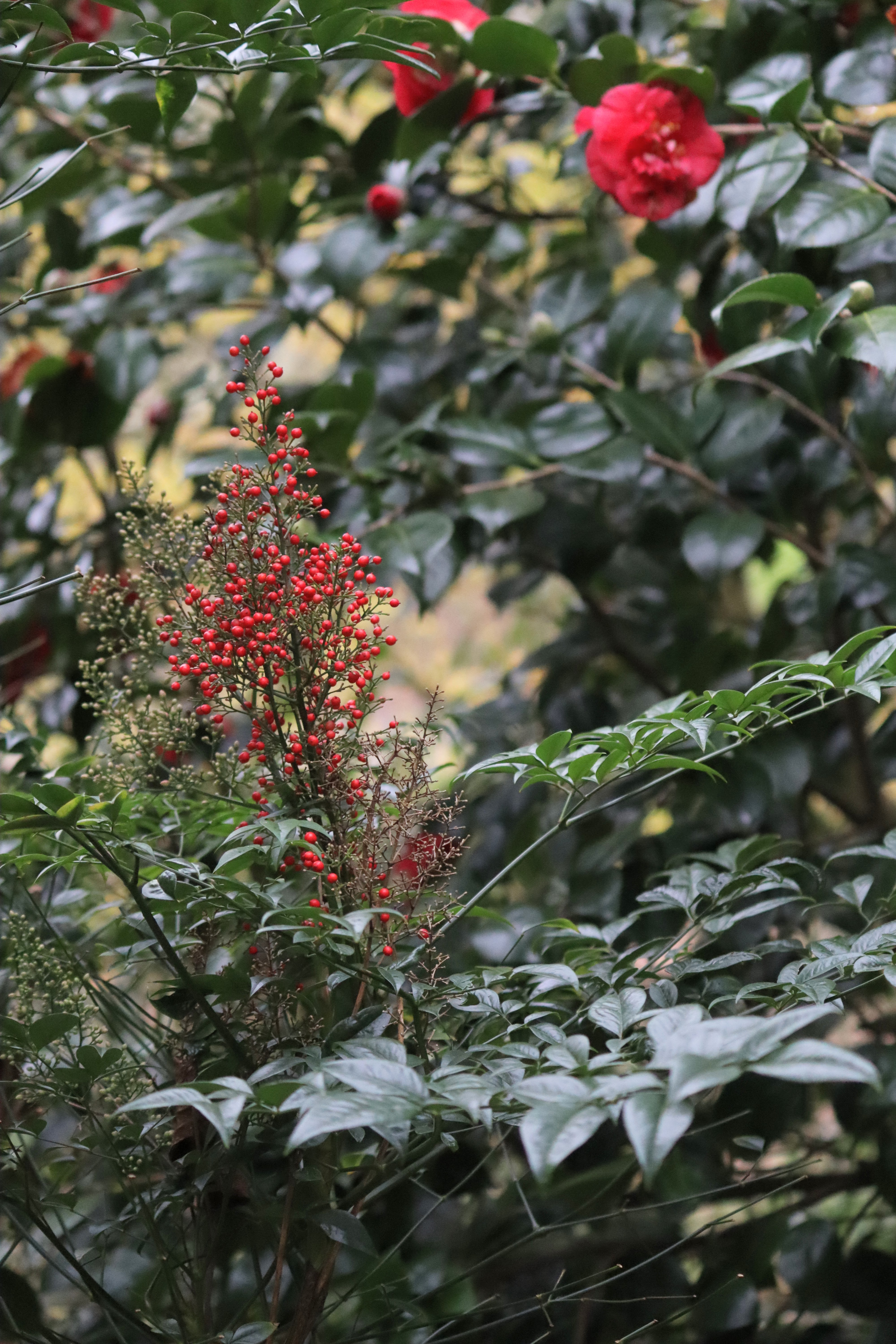
Nandina domestica 'Richmond' in Conservatoire botanique national de Brest

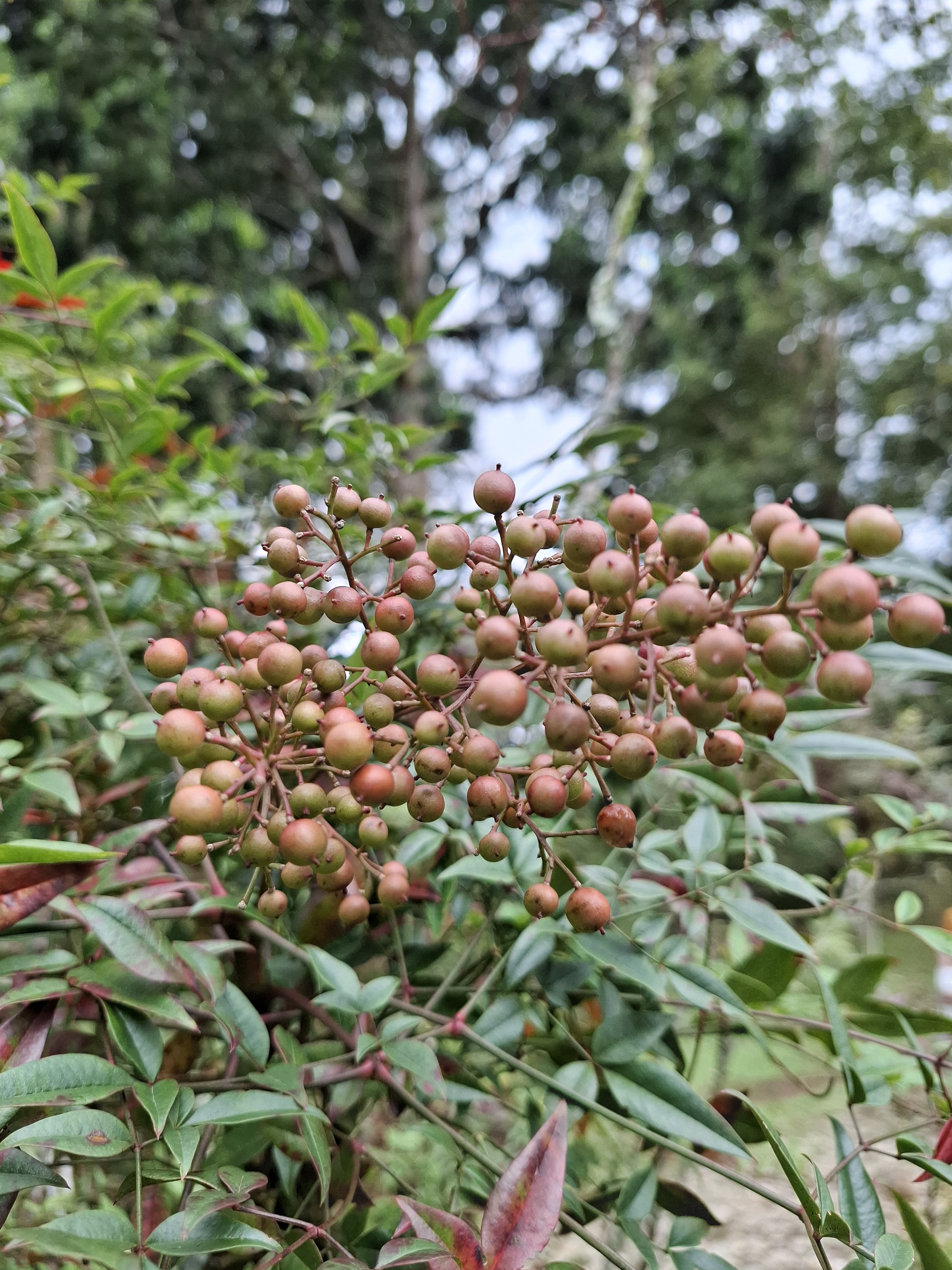
Fruits in Indonesia
