= The Song of Sway Lake =

2018 film by Ari Gold

- Film poster.
- Directed by: Ari Gold
- Written by: Ari Gold; Elizabeth Bull
- Produced by: Michael Bederman; Allison Rose Carter; Ari Gold; Zak Kilberg
- Starring: Rory Culkin; Robert Sheehan; Isabelle McNally; Mary Beth Peil; Elizabeth Peña; Jack Falahee
- Cinematography: Eric Lin
- Edited by: Christopher Dillon; Todd Holmes; Antony Langdon; Trevor Ristow; Gabriel Wrye
- Music by: Ethan Gold
- Production companies: Grack Films; Social Construct; Act Zero Films
- Distributed by: The Orchard
- Release date: September 21, 2018
- Running time: 94 minutes
- Country: United States
- Language: English

The Song of Sway Lake is a 2018 American romantic drama film directed by Ari Gold and starring Rory Culkin, Robert Sheehan, Isabelle McNally, Mary Beth Peil, Elizabeth Peña (her final film released following her death in 2014) and Jack Falahee.

== Cast ==
- Rory Culkin as Ollie
- Robert Sheehan as Nikolai
- Isabelle McNally as Isadora
- Mary Beth Peil as Charlie Sway
- Elizabeth Peña as Marlena
- Jack Falahee as Jimmy
- Brian Dennehy as Hal Sway
- Anna Shields as Heather
- Jason Brill as Timmy Sway

== Reception ==
The film has a 42% rating on Rotten Tomatoes. The site's critical consensus reads, "The Song of Sway Lake benefits from alluring, evocative atmosphere, although it isn't always enough to compensate for a shaggy narrative and overall lack of focus." Glenn Kenny of RogerEbert.com awarded the film two stars. Derek Smith of Slant Magazine awarded the film two stars out of four.
