= Maladies (film) =

- Directed by: Carter
- Written by: Carter
- Screenplay by: Carter
- Produced by: Fallon Goodson; Cynthia Huffman; Vince Jolivette; Justin L. Levine; Miles Levy; Jeff Most; Jeff Rice
- Starring: James Franco; Catherine Keener; Fallon Goodson; David Strathairn; Vince Jolivette; Jon Prescott; Carter; Jean Carter; Jermaine Crawford; Alan Cumming; Madalyn Lester; Mary Beth Peil; Julie Sharbutt; Meredith Anne Bull; Robert Zelnick; Jim Jones
- Narrated by: Ken Scott
- Cinematography: Doug Chamberlain
- Edited by: Curtiss Clayton
- Music by: J. Ralph
- Production companies: Rabbit Bandini Productions; Dot Dot Dot Productions; Stardust Pictures; Most Films; Jeff Rice Films
- Distributed by: Tribeca Film
- Release date: June 22, 2012
- Running time: 96 minutes
- Country: United States
- Language: English
- Budget: $1.5 million

Maladies is a 2012 film starring James Franco and written and directed by Carter. This was the pair's second collaboration, after Erased James Franco.

== Production ==
Franco plays a character who was an actor in a soap opera prior to the events in the film. The character's history led the director Carter to encourage Franco to acquire a role in a soap opera in real life. Franco took the advice and was able to land a role on General Hospital playing the eponymous character Franco, an artist and serial killer. In interviews, Carter and Franco have explained the decision as an attempt to help Franco understand his character in Maladies, as part of a series of performance art pieces accompanying the film's release, as a joke, and as some combination of all those things. Franco would ultimately use a great deal of the General Hospital footage as part of another experimental film, Francophenia.

== Plot ==
Maladies is divided into three chapters, titled "Feelings", "Symmetry", and "I See You". The course of the narrative lacks a specific timeframe; although the environment, setting and costumes appear designed for the early 1960s, repeated allusions to the cult leader Jim Jones in the film are somewhat jolting, as the footage of Jones used is from 1978. The film follows the foibles of its four main characters as they seek to resolve "maladies" that make it difficult for them to relate with one another and cope with themselves. James (James Franco) is an ex-TV star turned writer who finds himself unable to complete a novel. Patricia (Fallon Goodson), James' sister, is unable to speak. Catherine (Catherine Keener), their house-painter, is a cross-dresser. And Delmar, their neighbor (David Strathairn), must struggle with his unrequited love for James.

== Reception ==
Maladies premiered in 2013 at the Berlin International Film Festival and the SXSW film festival in Austin.

Critics have tended to dismiss the film, which has a decidedly "art-house" style, as opaque and obscurantist. The LA Times called Maladies "tedious". NPR mocked claims from Franco and Carter that the movie is a performance art piece and said Maladies is a "firehose".
