= Loitering with Intent (film) =

2014 comedy film

- Theatrical release poster
- Directed by: Adam Rapp
- Written by: Ivan Martin; Michael Godere
- Produced by: Keith Kjarval; Lars Kundsen; Tory Lenosky; Ivan Martin; Marisa Tomei; John Suits; Jan Van Hoy; Alex Sagalchik; Gabriel Cowan
- Starring: Ivan Martin; Michael Godere; Sam Rockwell; Brian Geraghty; Isabelle McNally; Natasha Lyonne; Marisa Tomei
- Cinematography: Radium Cheung
- Edited by: Rebecca Rodriguez; Michael Taylor
- Music by: Aleks de Carvalho; Money Mark
- Production companies: Parts and Labor; Mott Street Pictures; TideRock Films; Mm...Buttered Panini Productions; New Artists Alliance; Unified Pictures
- Distributed by: The Orchard
- Release dates: April 18, 2014 (Tribeca Film Festival); January 16, 2015 (United States)
- Running time: 80 minutes
- Country: United States
- Language: English

Loitering with Intent is a 2014 American comedy film directed by Adam Rapp and written by Ivan Martin and Michael Godere. The film stars Ivan Martin, Michael Godere, Brian Geraghty, Isabelle McNally, Natasha Lyonne, and Marisa Tomei. It premiered on April 18, 2014 at the Tribeca Film Festival. The film was released through video on demand on December 16, 2014, prior to a limited release on January 16, 2015 by The Orchard.

== Cast ==
- Ivan Martin as Raphael
- Michael Godere as Dominic
- Sam Rockwell as Wayne
- Brian Geraghty as Devon
- Isabelle McNally as Ava
- Natasha Lyonne as Kaplan
- Marisa Tomei as Gigi
- Britne Oldford as Izzy
- Patch Darragh as Carter
- Aya Cash as Jesse
- Adam Tomei as Nino

== Release ==
The film had its world premiere at the Tribeca Film Festival on April 18, 2014. Shortly after, it was announced that The Orchard had acquired U.S distribution rights to the film. It went onto screen at the Key West Film Festival on November 15, 2014. The film was released through video on demand on December 16, 2014, prior to a limited release on January 16, 2015.

== Critical response ==
Loitering with Intent received mixed reviews from film critics. It holds a 33% rating on the review aggregator website Rotten Tomatoes, based on 27 reviews, with an average rating of 5.2/10. The website's critics consensus reads, "True to its name, Loitering with Intent lingers longer than necessary -- and not with good reason -- as its script crumbles under the weight of mediocrity." On Metacritic the film holds a rating of 49 out of 100, based on 11 critics, indicating "mixed or average" reviews.
