= Gamma Phi Beta Sorority House (Urbana, Illinois) =

- U.S. National Register of Historic Places
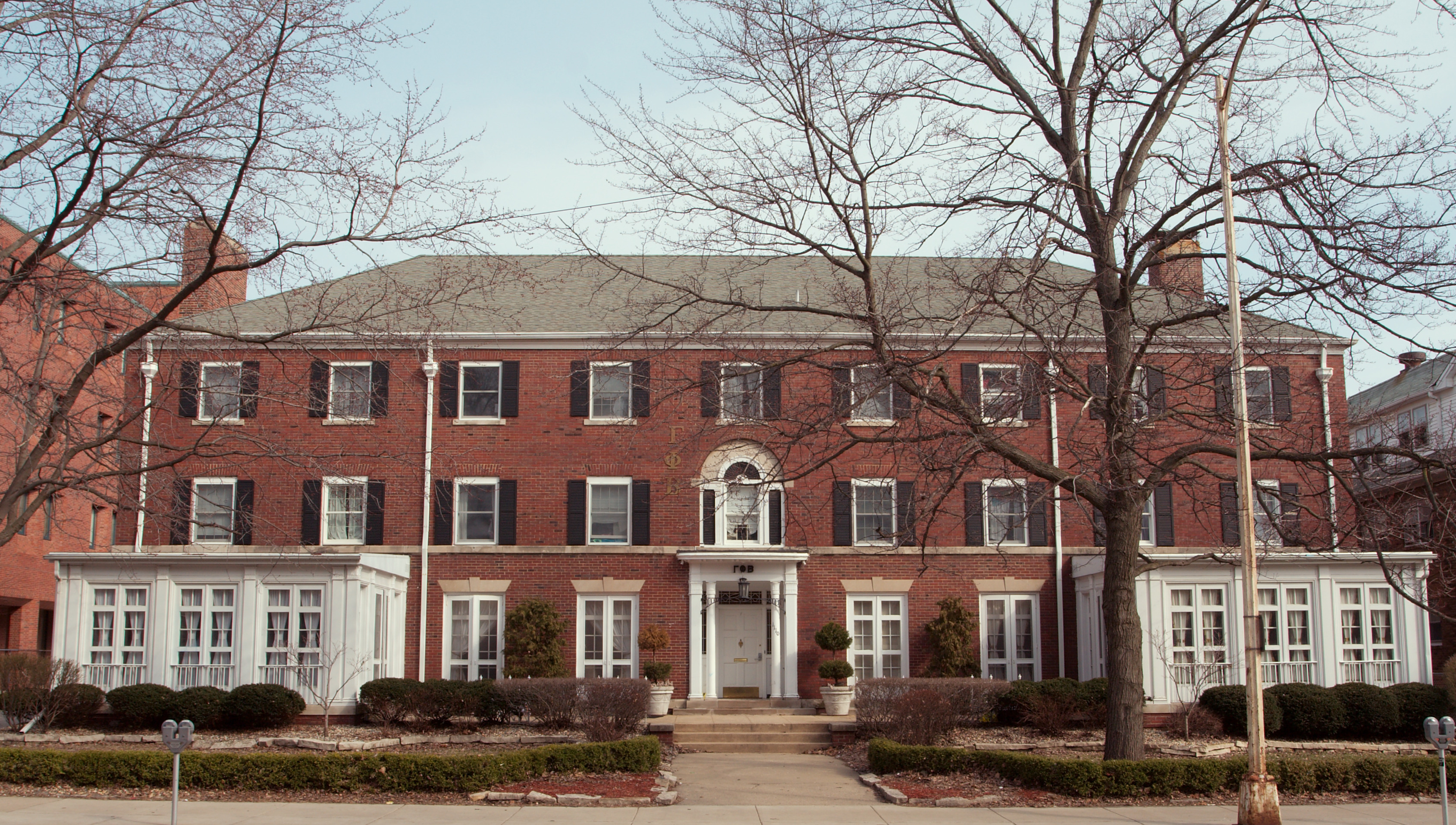

- Location within Illinois Location within the United States
- Location: 1110 W. Nevada St., Urbana, Illinois
- Coordinates: 40°6′21″N 88°13′21″W
- Area: less than one acre
- Built: 1918
- Architect: Hewitt, Emerson & Gregg
- Architectural style: Colonial Revival
- MPS: Fraternity and Sorority Houses at the Urbana--Champaign Campus of the University of Illinois MPS
- NRHP reference No.: 94001270
- Added to NRHP: October 28, 1994

The Gamma Phi Beta Sorority House is a historic sorority house located at the University of Illinois at Urbana–Champaign in Urbana, Illinois, United States. The house was built in 1918 for the university's Omicron chapter of the Gamma Phi Beta sorority, which was formed in 1909 as the Phi Beta Club and officially made part of the national sorority in 1913. During its early years, the chapter was noted for the academic success of its members, its promotion of women's issues on campus, and its social activities. The sorority's house was part of an emerging sorority district in Urbana; while the university's fraternity row was in Champaign, the Urbana site was closer to the women's dormitory and gymnasium and thus more attractive for sororities. In 1927, during a growth period for the university's Greek-letter organizations, architecture firm Hewitt, Emerson & Gregg designed and built a Georgian Revival expansion of the sorority's original duplex house.

The house was added to the National Register of Historic Places on October 28, 1994.
