= Gamma Phi Beta Sorority House (Eugene, Oregon) =

Historic house in Oregon, United States

- U.S. National Register of Historic Places
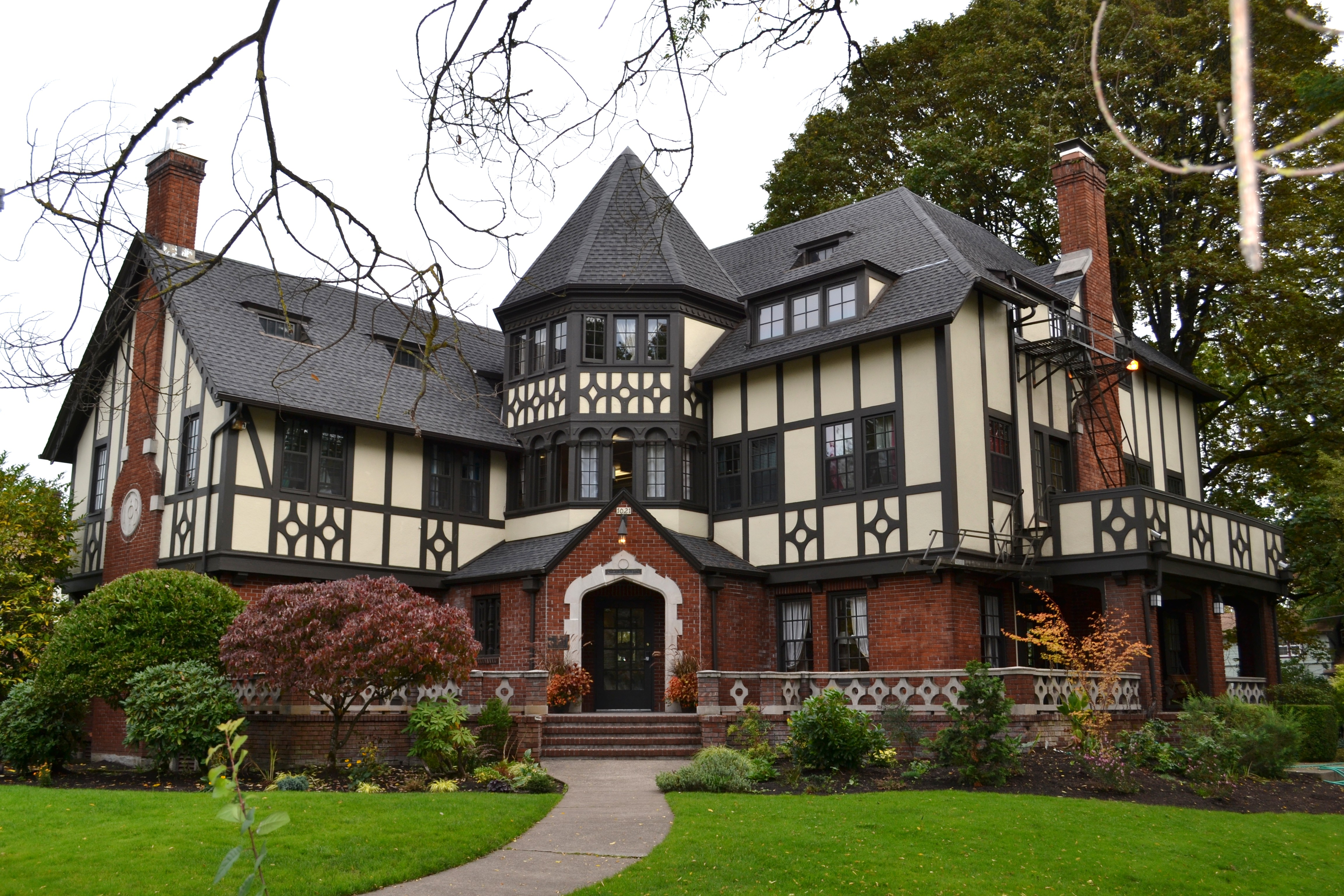
- The house's exterior, 2011

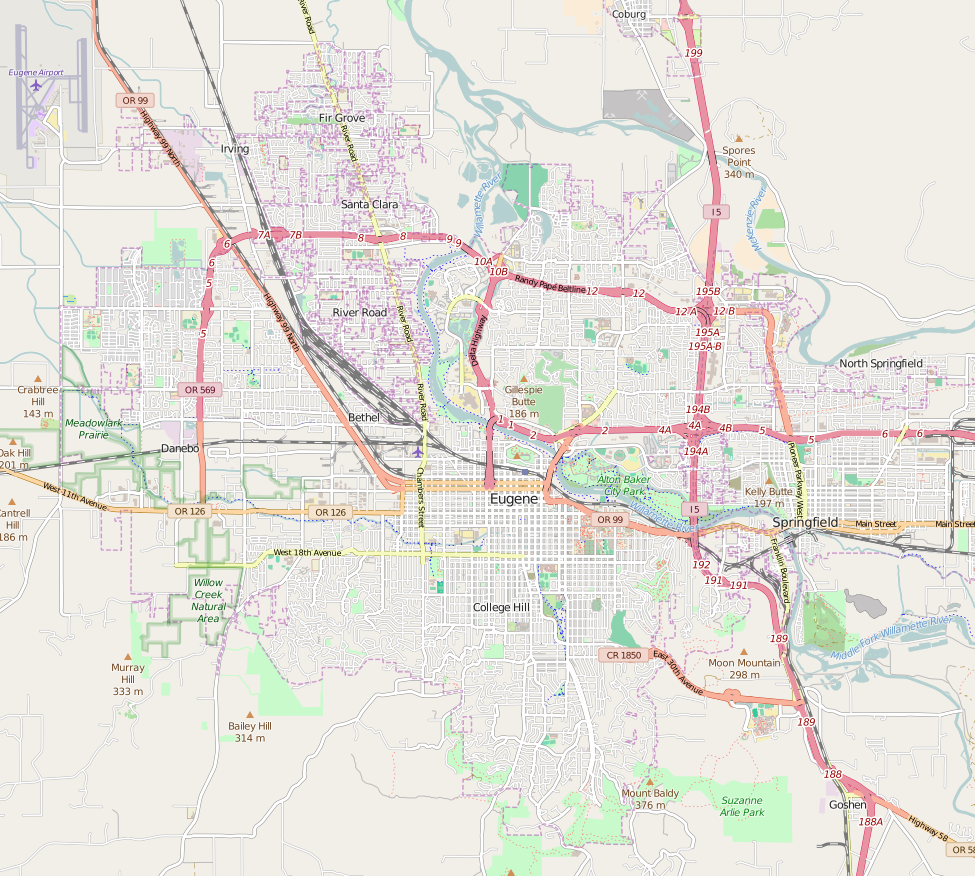
- Location within Eugene OR Location within Oregon
- Location: 1021 Hilyard Street, Eugene, Oregon, U.S.
- Coordinates: 44°2′55″N 123°4′50″W
- Built: 1926
- Architect: Hunzicker & Gerow; Et al.
- Architectural style: Tudor Revival
- MPS: Eugene West University Neighborhood MPS
- NRHP reference No.: 91001566
- Added to NRHP: October 24, 1991

The Gamma Phi Beta Sorority House, located in Eugene, Oregon, United States, is listed on the National Register of Historic Places.

== See also ==
- National Register of Historic Places listings in Lane County, Oregon
