= Blush (color) =

Color

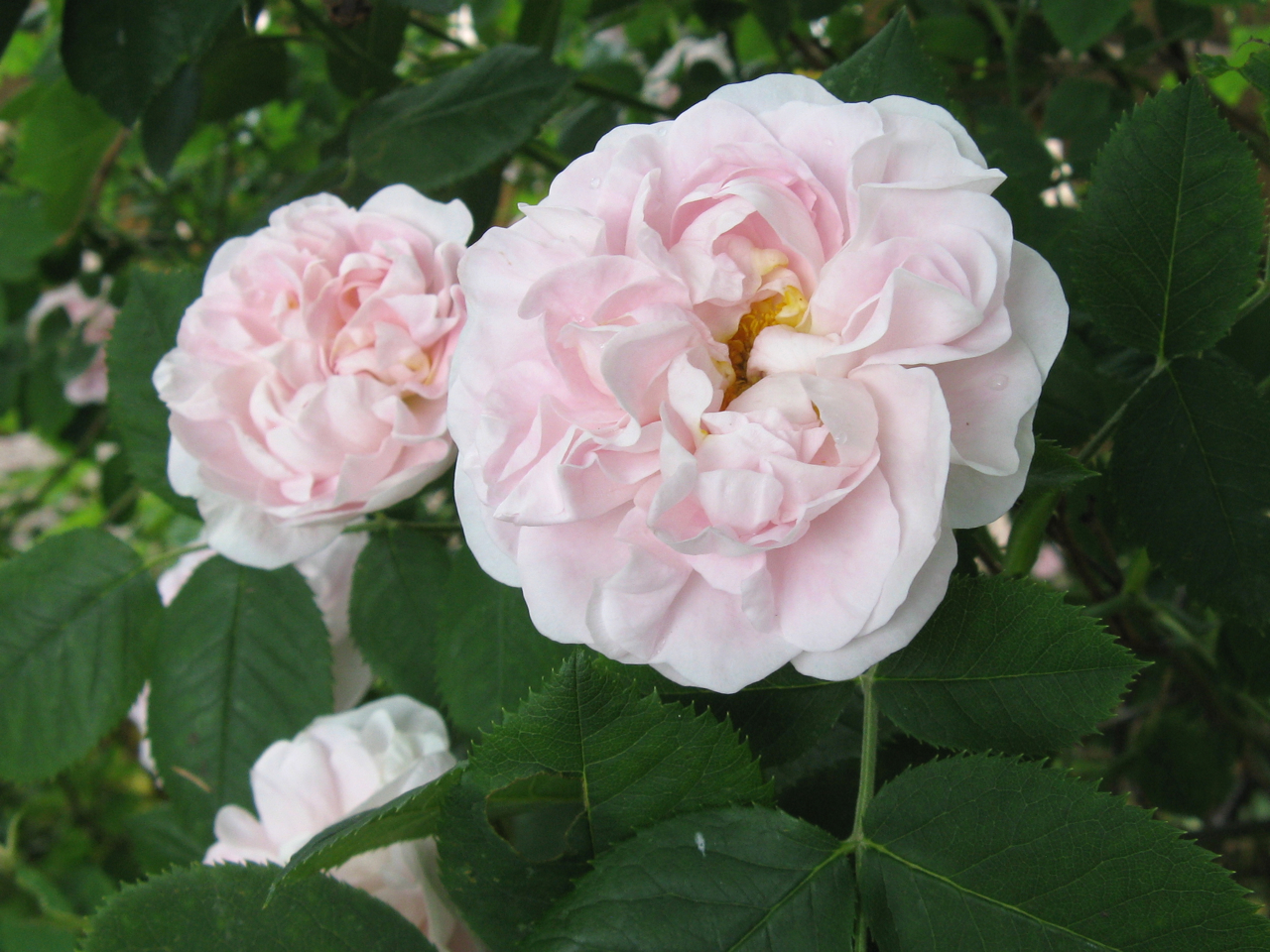
Blush rose

Blush is a medium bright tone of pink.

The first written use of blush as a color name in English was in 1590.

== Use ==
The color blush represents live theatre because it is a color often used for theatre makeup.

== Tones of blush color comparison chart ==
| Name | Color | HEX Code | Red | Green | Blue | Hue | Sat | Lum | Source |
|---|---|---|---|---|---|---|---|---|---|
| Light Lavender Blush | | #FFF9FB | 255 | 245 | 251 | 340° | 100% | 99% | Xona.com color list (Lavender Blush Light) |
| Lavender Blush | | #FFF0F5 | 255 | 240 | 245 | 340° | 100% | 97% | web color |
| Pale Blush | | #F4BBCF | 244 | 187 | 207 | 339° | 72% | 85% | Xona.com color list (Deep Blush Light) |
| Light Pale Red-Violet | | #F0B7CD | 240 | 183 | 205 | 337° | 66% | 83% | Xona.com color list "Pale Violet-Red Light" |
| Light Blush | | #DE98B2 | 222 | 152 | 178 | 338° | 51% | 73% | Xona.com color list (Blush Light) |
| Light Rouge | | #D58EB5 | 213 | 142 | 181 | 327° | 46% | 70% | Xona.com color list (Rouge Light) |
| Blush Pink | | #FE828C | 254 | 130 | 140 | 355° | 98% | 75% | Xona.com color list |
| Bright Blush | | #E47698 | 228 | 118 | 152 | 341° | 67% | 68% | Xona.com color list (Deep Blush) |
| Pale Red-Violet | | #DB7093 | 219 | 112 | 147 | 340° | 60% | 65% | web color Pale Violet-Red |
| Blush | | #DE5D83 | 222 | 93 | 131 | 342° | 66% | 62% | Crayola |
| Deep Blush | | #B44668 | 180 | 70 | 104 | 341° | 44% | 49% | Xona.com color list |
| Rouge | | #A23B6C | 162 | 59 | 108 | 331° | 47% | 43% | Xona.com color list |

== See also ==
- List of colors (compact)
