= Mary Beth Peil =

American actress and singer (born 1940)

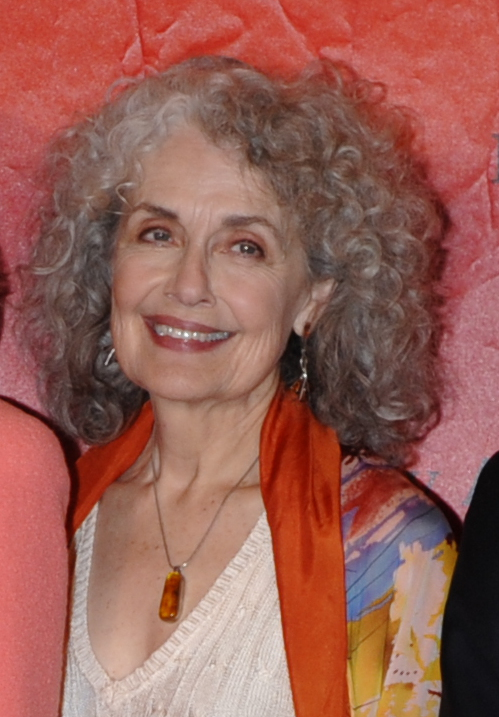
- Peil at the 2011 Peabody Awards
- Born: June 25, 1940 (age 86); Davenport, Iowa, U.S.
- Education: Northwestern University
- Occupations: Actress; Singer
- Years active: 1962–present

Mary Beth Peil (/ˈpiːl/; born June 25, 1940) is an American actress and soprano. She began her career as an opera singer in 1962 with the Goldovsky Opera Theater. In 1964 she won two major singing competitions, the Young Concert Artists International Auditions and the Metropolitan Opera National Council Auditions; the latter of which earned her a contract with the Metropolitan Opera National Company with whom she performed in two seasons of national tours as a leading soprano from 1965 to 1967. She continued to perform in operas through the 1970s, notably creating the role of Alma in the world premiere of Lee Hoiby's Summer and Smoke at the Minnesota Opera in 1971. She later recorded that role for American television in 1982. With that same opera company she transitioned into musical theatre, performing the title role of Cole Porter's Kiss Me, Kate in 1983. Later that year she joined the national tour of Rodgers and Hammerstein's The King and I as Anna Leonowens opposite Yul Brynner, and continued with that production when it opened on Broadway on January 7, 1985. She was nominated for a Tony Award for her portrayal.

After her Broadway debut, Peil has remained a stage actress in musicals and plays. She is the recipient of an Obie Award and has been nominated for a Drama Desk Award, a Helen Hayes Award, and two Outer Critics Circle Awards. She received a second Tony nomination in 2017 for her portrayal of Dowager Empress Maria Feodorovna in Anastasia. In 1992 she made her film debut in a small role in the movie Jersey Girl, and made her first appearance on television in 1994 on the program Law & Order. She is best known for her roles in the main casts of two television series: as Evelyn 'Grams' Ryan in Dawson's Creek (1998–2003) and Jackie Florrick in The Good Wife (2009–2016). Her notable film credits include portraying Jack Lemmon's love interest in The Odd Couple II (1999), and performances in The Stepford Wives (2004), Flags of Our Fathers (2006), Mirrors (2008), Maladies (2012), and Collateral Beauty (2016). In 2020 she was nominated for the Daytime Emmy Award for Outstanding Guest Performer in a Digital Drama Series for the role of Helen in After Forever.

== Early life ==
Peil (pronounced peel) was born in 1940 in Davenport, Iowa. She trained as a soprano at Northwestern University under Lotte Lehmann and gave her senior recital on April 9, 1962. Other influential teachers in her development in the university's music department included Robert Gay, the director of the opera program, and Ewald Nolte, who taught courses in music theory and composition and conducted a university chorus in which Peil performed. While a college student she was a member of the Gamma Phi Beta sorority.

== Career ==
=== Career as an opera and concert soprano: 1962–1982 ===
In her senior year, Peil performed the role of Violetta in Giuseppe Verdi's La traviata in a student production directed by Gay at Northwestern; a performance which was attended by Boris Goldovsky. This led to an invitation to audition for Goldovsky's opera company for an upcoming national tour of that opera. She was offered a contract, and moved to New York City in order to take that job. She made her professional debut as Violetta in the Fall of 1962 with the Goldovsky Opera Theater.

In 1964 Peil won two major singing contests, the Young Concert Artists International Auditions and the Metropolitan Opera National Council Auditions (MONCA), which significantly furthered her career as a classical soprano in concerts and opera. In March 1964 she won the MONCA which earned her a contract with the newly formed Metropolitan Opera National Company (MONC); a second touring company of the Metropolitan Opera. Mezzo-soprano Risë Stevens was one of the co-directors of the MONC, and Stevens mentored her during the two seasons that she performed with the company.

Peil made her opera debut with the MONC in September 1965 as Clorinda in Gioachino Rossini's La Cenerentola; going on to perform that role in 72 cities on a nine-month national tour with the MONC through May 1966. She also performed the role of Micaëla in Georges Bizet's Carmen with the MONC that first season. She toured nationally with the company again in its second season as Susanna in Wolfgang Amadeus Mozart's The Marriage of Figaro and Mimì in Giacomo Puccini's La bohème from September 1966 through May 1967; with periodic breaks during that period.

In 1965 Peil was the featured soprano soloist in a concert honoring Risë Stevens with the California Chamber Symphony at The Beverly Hilton. That same year she performed the role of Pamina in The Magic Flute with conductor Thomas Scherman and the Little Orchestra Society at Philharmonic Hall. In 1966 she was the soprano soloist in performances of Christian Ignatius Latrobe's Dies Irae at the Early American Moravian Music Festival at Salem College. In 1968 she made her much delayed New York recital debut at Weill Recital Hall of Carnegie Hall as part of her Young Concert Artists win from years earlier. She also sang with the New York City Opera, making her debut with the company in the Spring of 1972.

Peil performed as a chamber musician during the late 1960s and 1970s, often in conjunction with her then husband, the clarinetist Jerry Kirkbride. Both were members of the Divario Chamber Ensemble in 1969 and 1970. In 1976 the two of them were guest artists with the Boehm Quintette in a concert organized by the New York Flute Club entitled "The Flute In American Music- A Concert commemorating the Bicentennial of the Independence of the United States" at Carnegie Hall. On her own, she was the featured soprano soloist in a concert of Bach cantatas with the Hampshire Quartet at Alice Tully Hall in 1972. In the mid 1970s she performed with the Musical Arts Studio chamber opera ensemble, including performances at the Library of Congress in 1973. In 1977 she performed in a concert of Gerald Ginsburg's 'theatre lieder' at Alice Tully Hall.

In 1971, Peil originated the role of Alma in the world premiere of Lee Hoiby's opera adaptation of Tennessee Williams's play Summer and Smoke, at the Minnesota Opera. She performed it again with the Chicago Opera Theater when it was broadcast on television in 1982 (based on a 1980 performance). She returned to the Minnesota Opera several more times. With that company she portrayed Leonora in the United States premiere of Carl Nielsen's Maskarade in 1972.

=== Transition to stage actress: 1983–1991 ===
Peil made a transition into musical theatre with the Minnesota Opera, performing the title role of Cole Porter's Kiss Me, Kate in 1983. Of that experience Peil stated, "That was when the light bulb went on. Doing Kiss Me, Kate with my beloved John Reardon made me realize I was a singing actor, not an acting singer."

She soon found herself on Broadway. In May 1983 she was cast in a national tour as the twelfth and final Anna Leonowens opposite Yul Brynner's monarch of Siam in a revival of The King and I. The production toured the United States, closing on Broadway shortly before Brynner's death in 1985. In an interview in The New York Times, she described how Brynner could barely walk from his dressing room to the stage, due to his radiation therapy to treat his cancer, but when it was time to go on he somehow managed; "gliding into the light, erect, with the body of a sleek jungle cat". She was nominated for a 1985 Tony Award for Best Performance by a Featured Actress in a Musical. She later returned to the role of Anna Leonowens for a revival of the musical at the Shubert Theatre in New Haven, Connecticut in 1990 with Stacy Keach as the King.

In 1986 Peil starred in Michel Tremblay's play The Impromptu of Outremont at the Lincoln Theater on the campus of the University of Hartford. She starred in the 1987 off-Broadway musical Birds of Paradise. In 1988 she portrayed Desiree Armfeldt in Stephen Sondheim's A Little Night Music with the Opera Ensemble of New York. In 1989 she performed in William Shakespeare's Cymbeline at The Public Theater under the direction of JoAnne Akalaitis. She portrayed President J.F.K.'s secretary, a central character in the musical, in Michael John LaChiusa's Over Texas with the Ensemble Studio Theatre in 1991. That same year she starred in Ödön von Horváth's Tales from the Vienna Woods at the Actors Theater of Louisville.

=== Career on screen and stage: 1992–2003 ===
In 1993 Peil moved back to New York City after divorcing Jerry Kirkbride with whom she had raised two children, Gwyneth and Michael, in Leonia, New Jersey. She had made her film debut earlier in 1992's Jersey Girl and her television debut on Law & Order in 1994. Her first larger role in film was in the 1995 independent drama film Comfortably Numb. She portrayed Felice, the love interest of Felix (played by Jack Lemmon), in the 1999 comedy film The Odd Couple II. She portrayed Nancy Reagan's mother, actress Edith Luckett, in the Showtime movie The Reagans (2003). Between 1998 and 2003, she was introduced to a wider audience through her role as Evelyn 'Grams' Ryan on the teen television drama Dawson's Creek. Alongside the four main young stars of that show, she was the only actress to appear as a credited regular throughout the show's six-season run, appearing in 74 of 128 episodes.

Peil continued in the theatre while branching out into television and film. In 1992 she portrayed the beggar woman in Sweeney Todd at the Paper Mill Playhouse with George Hearn as Sweeney and Judy Kaye as Mrs. Lovett. That same year she appeared in the premiere of Romulus Linney's Democracy and Esther; an adaptation of Henry Adams's novels Democracy: An American Novel (1880) and Esther (1884) into a single play. She starred in the premiere of another play by Linney in 1993, the role of the psychoanalyst in Spain. In 1994 she starred in three one act plays by Edward Albee presented collectively under the tile Sand by the Signature Theatre Company: Box (1968), The Sandbox (1960), and Finding the Sun (1983).

Peil won an Obie Award in 1995 for her work in three non-musical plays off-Broadway: Paul Rudnick's The Naked Truth (as Nan, 1994 at the WPA Theater), A. R. Gurney's A Cheever Evening (as Peaches, 1994 with Playwrights Horizons), and Craig Lucas's Missing Persons (1995, as Addie with the Atlantic Theater Company).). She returned to the role of Nan in a revision of The Naked Truth, now retitled The Naked Eye, at Harvard University's American Repertory Theater in 1996. In 1996 and 1997, she toured in Gurney's play, Sylvia with Charles Kimbrough and Stephanie Zimbalist. In 1997 she appeared in the celebrated revival of George S. Kaufman and Ring Lardner's June Moon at the Ohio Theater in SoHo. That same year she portrayed Hesione in Pierre de Marivaux's The Triumph of Love at the Yale Repertory Theatre (YRT).

Peil played evangelist Aimee Semple McPherson and First Lady Lou Henry Hoover in a 1998 off-Broadway revival of the Irving Berlin – Moss Hart revue As Thousands Cheer at the Greenwich House Theater. In May 1999, Peil portrayed Judith in the YRT's production of the Noël Coward play Hay Fever. She played the beggar woman in Sweeney Todd at the Kennedy Center in 2002 and in the spring of 2003 she played the mother of Antonio Banderas's character in a Broadway revival of the musical Nine. In the winter of 2003, she again appeared off-Broadway, starring in Frame 312, Keith Reddin's play about the assassination of John F. Kennedy.

=== Recent career: 2004–present ===
After Dawson's Creek ended in 2003, Peil portrayed Helen Devlin in Frank Oz's 2004 film The Stepford Wives with Nicole Kidman, Matthew Broderick, and Bette Midler. Her other recent film credits include Clint Eastwood's Flags of Our Fathers (2006), the thriller Mirrors (2008), Maladies (2012), Contest (2013), Collateral Beauty (2016), The Song of Sway Lake (2018), and Here and Now (2018). From 2009 to 2016, she played Jackie Florrick, the mother of Chris Noth's character Peter Florrick, on the CBS drama The Good Wife. In 2019 she portrayed the recurring role of Gwendolina Ferrari on NBC's The Village and in 2020 she portrayed the recurring role of Loretta Lacy on The CW's Katy Keene. In 2021 she appeared in the role of Martha Graham in the Netflix series Halston.

On the stage, Peil portrayed Eleanor Roosevelt in the 2004 off-Broadway revival of Michael John LaChiusa First Lady Suite at The Connelly Theater. That same year she portrayed Juliana Tesman in Henrik Ibsen's Hedda Gabler with the New York Theatre Workshop under the direction of Ivo van Hove; and performed the role of Mrs. Mallard in Jeffrey Hatcher and Bill Russell's musical Lucky Duck at the Old Globe Theatre. In 2005 she performed the role of Rose in Harold Pinter's The Room with the Atlantic Theater Company (ATC). In 2006 she created the role of Clare in the world premiere of Joan Vail Thorne's The Things You Least Expect at the George Street Playhouse. That same year she starred as Celeste Albaret in the world premiere of Mary Zimmerman's monodrama M. Proust with the Steppenwolf Theatre Company in Chicago. In 2007 she performed the role of Ann in Gurney's The Cocktail Hour at the Long Wharf Theatre.

In 2008 Peil appeared as the Old Lady and Blair Daniels in the Roundabout Theatre Broadway revival of Stephen Sondheim's musical Sunday in the Park with George. Starting in October 2010 she appeared in the original Broadway cast of the Lincoln Center Theater production of the musical Women on the Verge of a Nervous Breakdown, which is based upon the movie of the same name. The show had a limited run until January 2011. Peil appeared in Stephen Sondheim's Follies on Broadway in the role of Solange LaFitte, alongside Bernadette Peters and Elaine Paige, starting in August 2011. In March 2012, she appeared as Erika Morini in Willy Holtzman's off-Broadway play The Morini Strad about the concert violinist. Later that year she performed the role of Alison Woollley in the New York premiere of Simon Stephens's Harper Regan with the ATC.

In 2013 Peil starred alongside Jeff Goldblum and Laurie Metcalf in the world premiere of Bruce Norris's Domesticated at the Mitzi E. Newhouse Theater at Lincoln Center. In 2014 she portrayed Celia Peachum in Bertolt Brecht's The Threepenny Opera with the ATC. In 2015 she appeared as Serafima in Moira Buffini's Dying for It, an adaptation of Nikolai Erdman's The Suicide, with the ATC. She returned to Broadway as Matilde Schell in the 2015 revival of Kander and Ebb's The Visit starring Chita Rivera; and as Madame de Rosemonde in the 2016 revival of Christopher Hampton's Les Liaisons Dangereuses.

Peil next joined the cast of the musical Anastasia playing the Dowager Empress Maria Feodorovna, the grandmother of the Grand Duchess Anastasia. Based on the 1997 animated film, Anastasia has music and lyrics by Lynn Ahrens and Stephen Flaherty and a book by Terrence McNally. The musical began as a workshop in 2015, it then had out of town tryouts in Hartford, Connecticut, in 2016 before eventually opening on Broadway in 2017. Peil was nominated for a Tony Award, a Drama Desk Award and an Outer Critics Circle Award for Best Featured Actress in a Musical for her role. In 2019 she portrayed Mama Mizner in the Encores! revival of Stephen Sondheim's Road Show.

== Filmography ==
=== Film ===
Year	Title	Role	Notes
1992	Jersey Girl	Day Care Center Teacher	
1995	Reckless	Bartender	
1995	Comfortably Numb	Emily Best	
1998	Number One	Lana	Short film
1999	The Odd Couple II	Felice	
1999	Advice from a Caterpillar	Homeless Woman	
2004	The Stepford Wives	Helen Devlin	
2006	Shortbus	Ann	
2006	The Caretakers	Olivia	Short film
2006	Flags of Our Fathers	Mrs. Bradley	
2007	The List	Daisy Stokes	
2008	Old Days	Lillian	Short film
2008	Mirrors	Anna Esseker	
2010	The Locksmith	Celine	
2011	Small, Beautifully Moving Parts	Marjorie Sparks	
2012	Maladies	Blind Woman	
2013	Contest	"Gran" Angela Maria Tucci	
2016	Collateral Beauty	Mrs. Yardsham	
2017	The Song of Sway Lake	Charlie Sway	
2018	Here and Now	Dr. Marianne Holt	
2025	The Home	Norma	

=== Television ===
Year	Title	Role	Notes
1994	Law & Order	Dr. Emma Hiltz	Episode: "Family Values"
1998–2003	Dawson's Creek	Evelyn "Grams" Ryan	66 episodes
2001	The Job	Mrs. Peg Bermance	Episode: "Massage"
2003	The Reagans	Edith Davis	Television movie
2005	Law & Order: Special Victims Unit	Deb Boyd	Episode: "Alien"
2009–2016	The Good Wife	Jackie Florrick	49 episodes
2009	Fringe	Jessica Warren	Episode: "The No-Brainer"
2011	American Masters	Mrs. Carr (voice)	Episode: "John Muir in the New World"
2012	Submissions Only	Beverly Wilcox	Episode: "The Growing Interconnectedness"
2019	The Village	Gwendolina Ferrari	5 episodes
2020	Katy Keene	Loretta Lacy	4 episodes
2021	Halston	Martha Graham	Episode: "Critics"

== Theater ==
Year	Play	Role	Theatre
1985	The King and I	Anna Leonowens	Broadway Theatre, Broadway
1987	Birds of Paradise	Marjorie	Promenade Theatre, off-Broadway
1988	The Sound of Music	Elsa Schraeder	regional tour
1989	Cymbeline	Ghost Mother	The Public Theater, off-Broadway
1991	Four Short Operas	Mary/Woman/Woman/Madge	Playwrights Horizons, off-Broadway
1992	Sweeney Todd	Beggar Woman	Paper Mill Playhouse, regional
1993	Assassins	Sara Jane Moore	San Jose Civic, regional
1994	Floyd Collins	Miss Jane	Prince Music Theater
1994	Box, The Sandbox, and Finding the Sun	Edmee	Signature Theatre Company, off-Broadway
1994	The Naked Truth	Nan Bemiss	WPA Theatre, off-Broadway
1994–1995	A Cheever Evening	Performer	Playwrights Horizons, off-Broadway
1995	Missing Persons	Addie	Atlantic Theater Company, off-Broadway
1995	Sylvia	Kate (Replacement)	New York City Center Stage I, off-Broadway
1998–1999	As Thousands Cheer	Performer	Greenwich House, off-off-Broadway
2002	Sweeney Todd	Beggar Woman	The Kennedy Center, regional
2003	Nine	Guido's Mother	Eugene O'Neill Theatre, Broadway
2003–2004	Frame 312	Lynette (1990's)	Atlantic Theater Company, off-Broadway
2004	First Lady Suite	Eleanor Roosevelt	Connelly Theatre, off-off-Broadway
2004	Lucky Duck	Various	Old Globe Theatre, regional
2004	Hedda Gabler	Aunt Julia	New York Theatre Workshop, off-Broadway
2005–2006	Celebration and The Room	Rose	Atlantic Theater Company, off-Broadway
2007	33 Variations	Katherine Brandt	Arena Stage, regional
2008	Sunday in the Park with George	Old Lady/Blair Daniels	Studio 54, Broadway
2010–2011	Women on the Verge of a Nervous Breakdown	Pepa's Concierge	Belasco Theatre, Broadway
2011–2012	Follies	Solange LaFitte	Marquis Theatre, Broadway
2012	The Morini Strad	Erica	59E59 Theaters, off-Broadway
2012	Follies	Solange LaFitte	Ahmanson Theatre, regional
2012	Harper Regan	Allison Wooley	Atlantic Theater Company, off-Broadway
2013	My Fair Lady	Mrs. Pearce	Kennedy Center, regional
2013–2014	Domesticated	Shrink	Mitzi E. Newhouse Theater, off-Broadway
2014	The Threepenny Opera	Mrs. Peachum	Atlantic Theater Company, off-Broadway
2015	Dying For It	Serafima Ilyinichna	Atlantic Theater Company, off-Broadway
2015	The Visit	Matilde Schell	Lyceum Theatre, Broadway
2016–2017	Les Liaisons Dangereuses	Madame de Rosemonde	Booth Theatre, Broadway
2017–2018	Anastasia	Dowager Empress	Broadhurst Theatre, Broadway
2019	Macbeth	Duncan/Old Woman	Classic Stage Company, off-Broadway
2019	Road Show	Mama Mizner	New York City Center, Encores!
2025	Anastasia	Dowager Empress	David Geffen Hall
2026	The Reservoir	Irene	Atlantic Theatre Company, Off-Broadway
2026	An American Daughter	Chubby	Pershing Square Signature Center, Off-Broadway

== Awards and nominations ==
Year	Award	Category	Work	Result	Ref.
1985	Tony Award	Best Leading Actress in a Musical	The King and I	Nominated	
1995	Obie Award	Distinguished Performance	A Cheever Evening, Missing Persons and The Naked Truth	Won	
2003	Outer Critics Circle Awards	Outstanding Featured Actress in a Musical	Nine	Nominated	
2017	Tony Award	Best Featured Actress in a Musical	Anastasia	Nominated	
2017	Drama Desk Award	Outstanding Featured Actress in a Musical	Anastasia	Nominated	
2017	Outer Critics Circle Awards	Outstanding Featured Actress in a Musical	Anastasia	Nominated	
