= List of Timothée Chalamet performances =

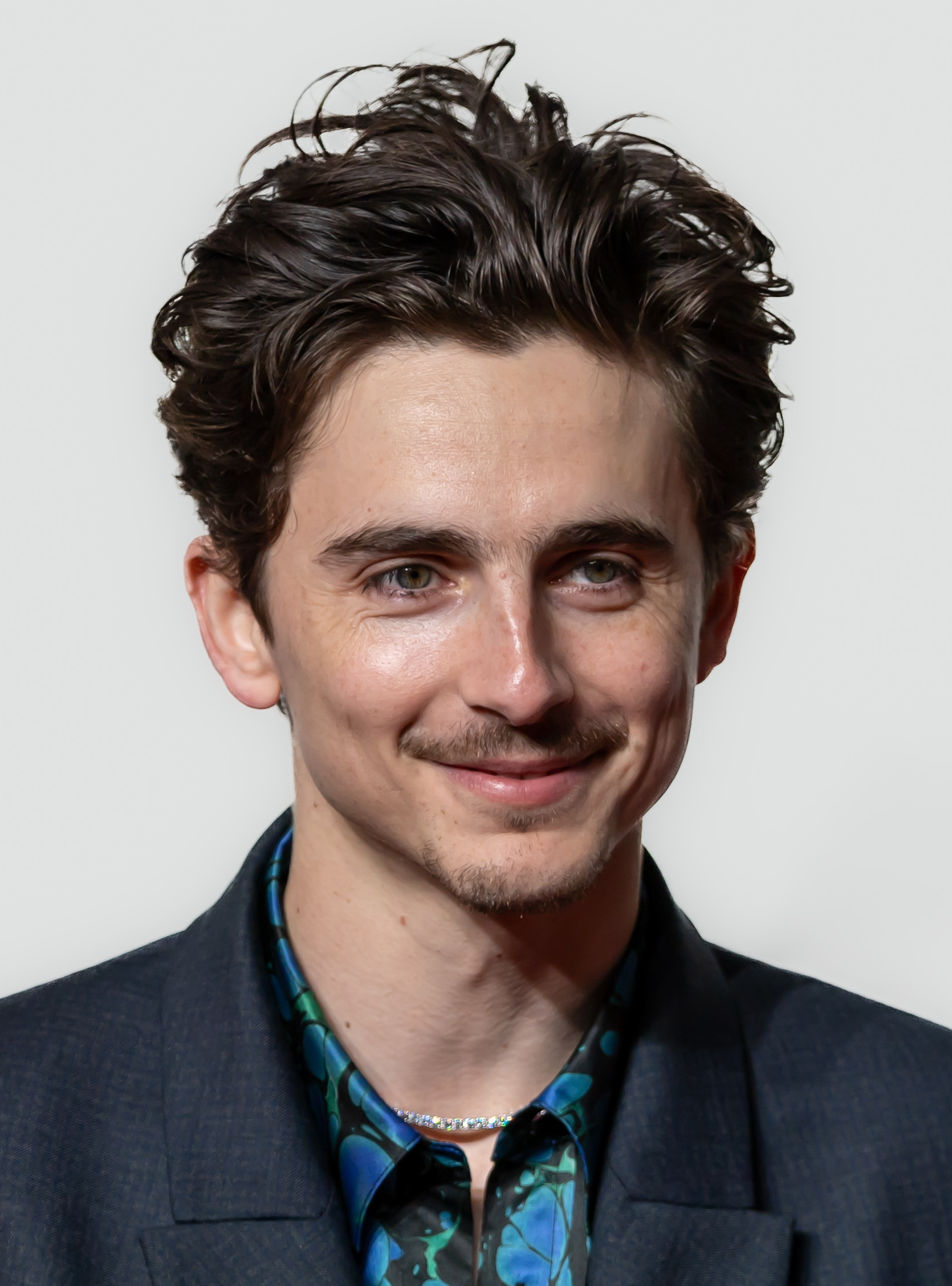
Chalamet in 2025

Timothée Chalamet is an American and French actor. Chalamet began acting in commercials and short films before landing roles in television. In 2012, he had recurring roles in the drama series Royal Pains and the acclaimed thriller series Homeland, in which Chalamet played Finn Walden, the rebellious son of the Vice President. Along with the rest of the cast, he was nominated for a SAG Award for Best Ensemble. In 2014, he made his film debut in a minor role in Jason Reitman's comedy-drama Men, Women & Children. That same year, he played the role of Tom Cooper, the son of Matthew McConaughey's character, in Christopher Nolan's science fiction Interstellar.

In 2015, Chalamet co-starred in Andrew Droz Palermo's fantasy thriller One & Two, which premiered at the Berlin International Film Festival, before its limited theatrical release. His next role was playing the teenage version of James Franco's character, Stephen Elliott, in Pamela Romanowsky's The Adderall Diaries. In his final role of 2015, Chalamet played Charlie Cooper, the sullen grandson of Diane Keaton and John Goodman's characters in the Christmas comedy Love the Coopers. In 2016, Chalamet starred as Jim Quinn in the autobiographical play Prodigal Son at Manhattan Theatre Club. Handpicked by its playwright and director John Patrick Shanley and producer Scott Rudin, Chalamet portrayed a younger Shanley, a misfit Bronx kid in a prestigious New Hampshire prep school set in 1963. His performance was praised and won him the Lucille Lortel Award for Outstanding Lead Actor in a Play, in addition to a nomination for the Drama League Award for Distinguished Performance. Chalamet also co-starred opposite Lily Rabe in Julia Hart's Miss Stevens as the troubled student Billy Mitman.

In 2017, his portrayal of a young man in Luca Guadagnino's coming-of-age Call Me by Your Name proved to be a turning point in his career. Earned critical acclaim and several accolades including Gotham Independent Film Award for Breakthrough Performer and nominations for the Golden Globe Award, BAFTA Award, and Academy Award, all for Best Actor. Later that year, Chalamet starred in the drama Beautiful Boy. Directed by Felix Van Groeningen. He received nominations for Best Supporting Actor at the Golden Globe, Actor, and BAFTA award ceremonies.

In 2019, Chalamet had three releases, started with Woody Allen's romantic comedy A Rainy Day in New York. David Michôd's Netflix period drama The King, based on several plays from Shakespeare's Henriad. In his final release of 2019, he portrayed Theodore "Laurie" Laurence, a lovestruck teenager, in the acclaimed period drama Little Women, an adaptation of Louisa May Alcott's novel of the same name. In 2021, Chalamet portrayed a student revolutionary in Wes Anderson's ensemble comedy-drama The French Dispatch. In his next release he starred as Paul Atreides in Denis Villeneuve's film adaptation of the science fiction novel Dune. In his last release of 2021, Chalamet played a skater punk in Adam McKay's Netflix ensemble comedy film Don't Look Up.

He then portrayed Willy Wonka in the musical film Wonka, directed by Paul King. His performance earned him another nomination for a Golden Globe Award for Best Actor. The following year, Chalamet reprised the role of Paul Atreides in the sequel to Dune, titled Dune: Part Two. Dune: Part Two grossed over $714 million worldwide to rank as the highest-grossing film with Chalamet in a starring role and the seventh highest-grossing film of 2024. The following year, he played a character inspired by Marty Reisman in the sports film Marty Supreme, directed by Josh Safdie, which he also produced. For his work as an actor and producer, he received two Academy Award nominations for Best Actor and Best Picture respectively, becoming both the youngest male actor to be nominated in the lead category thrice since Marlon Brando in 1954 and the youngest person ever to be nominated twice for acting and producing in the same year.

== Filmography ==
Key
†	Denotes films that have not yet been released

=== Film ===
Year	Title	Role	Notes	Ref.
2013	Burning Blue	Dylan Lynch	Director's cut	
2014	Men, Women & Children	Danny Vance		
2014	Worst Friends	Young Sam		
2014	Interstellar	Young Tom Cooper		
2015	One & Two	Zac		
2015	The Adderall Diaries	Teenage Stephen Elliott		
2015	Love the Coopers	Charlie Cooper		
2016	Miss Stevens	Billy Mitman		
2017	Call Me by Your Name	Elio Perlman		
2017	Hot Summer Nights	Daniel Middleton		
2017	Lady Bird	Kyle Scheible		
2017	Hostiles	Pvt. Philippe DeJardin		
2018	Beautiful Boy	Nic Sheff		
2019	A Rainy Day in New York	Gatsby Welles		
2019	The King	Henry V of England		
2019	Little Women	Theodore "Laurie" Laurence		
2021	The French Dispatch	Zeffirelli B.		
2021	Dune	Paul Atreides		
2021	A Man Named Scott	Himself	Documentary	
2021	Don't Look Up	Yule		
2022	Bones and All	Lee	Also producer	
2023	Wonka	Willy Wonka		
2024	Dune: Part Two	Paul Atreides		
2024	A Complete Unknown	Bob Dylan	Also producer	
2025	Marty Supreme	Marty Mauser	Also producer	
2026	Dune: Part Three †	Paul Atreides	Post-production	
2027	Not Alone †	Joe (voice)	In production	

=== Television ===
Year	Title	Role	Notes	Ref.
2009	Law & Order	Eric Foley	1 episode: "Pledge"	
2009	Loving Leah	Young Jake Lever	Television film	
2012	Royal Pains	Luke	Recurring role, 4 episodes	
2012	Homeland	Finn Walden	Recurring role, 8 episodes	
2020–2025	Saturday Night Live	Himself (host) (Note: Chalamet has appeared three times as host, once as a musical guest, and made a cameo in 2021)	4 episodes	
2022	Entergalactic	Jimmy (voice)	Television special	

=== Theater ===
Year	Production	Role	Playwright	Venue	Ref.
2011	The Talls	Nicholas Clarke	Anna Kerrigan	McGinn/Cazale Theater, Off-Broadway	
2016	Prodigal Son	Jim Quinn	John Patrick Shanley	Manhattan Theatre Club, Off-Broadway	

== Discography ==
=== Soundtrack albums ===
List of soundtrack albums, with selected chart positions
Title	Album details	Peak chart positions				
Title	Album details	US Sales	US Sound.	UK Amer.	UK Comp.	UK Sound.
A Complete Unknown (Original Motion Picture Soundtrack)	Released: December 20, 2024; Label: Columbia; Formats: CD, vinyl, digital download, streaming	44	17	5	11	3

=== Singles ===
List of singles as lead artist
Title	Year	Album
"Girl from the North Country" (with Monica Barbaro)	2024	A Complete Unknown
"Like a Rolling Stone"	2024	A Complete Unknown
"Desert Chant" (with Hans Zimmer)	2026	Dune: Part Three

=== Other charted songs ===
List of other charted songs
Title	Year	Peak chart positions	Album
Title	Year	UK	Album
"You've Never Had Chocolate Like This"	2023	78	Wonka

=== Guest appearances ===
List of non-single guest appearances, with other performing artists, showing year released and album name
Title	Year	Other artist(s)	Album
"A Hatful of Dreams"	2023	Cast of Wonka	Wonka
"You've Never Had Chocolate Like This (Hoverchocs)"	2023	None	Wonka
"For a Moment"	2023	Calah Lane	Wonka
"You've Never Had Chocolate Like This"	2023	Cast of Wonka	Wonka
"Oompa Loompa"	2023	Hugh Grant	Wonka
"A World of Your Own"	2023	Cast of Wonka	Wonka
"Sorry, Noodle"	2023	None	Wonka
"Pure Imagination"	2023	None	Wonka
"4 Raws" (remix)	2025	EsDeeKid	Non-album song

== See also ==
- List of awards and nominations received by Timothée Chalamet
