= List of awards and nominations received by Timothée Chalamet =

Timothée Chalamet awards and nominations
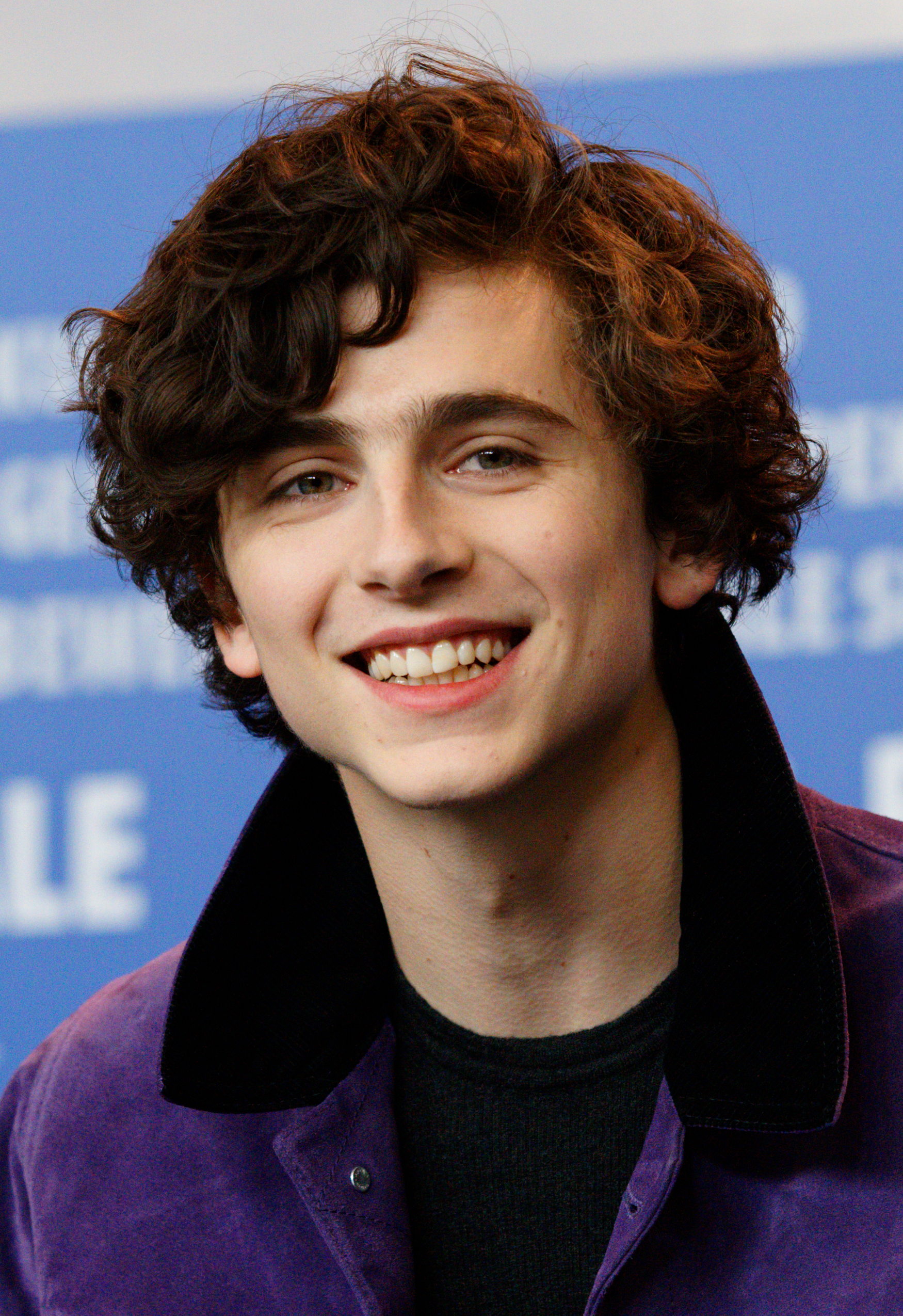
- Chalamet in 2017
Awards and nominations
Award	Wins	Nominations
Academy Awards	0	4
Actor Awards	1	9
BAFTA Awards	0	6
Critics' Choice Awards	2	11
Golden Globe Awards	1	5
Grammy Awards	0	1
Producers Guild Award	0	1
Tony Award	0	0

Totals (Note: Certain award groups do not simply award one winner. They acknowledge several different recipients, have runners-up, and have third place. Since this is a specific recognition and is different from losing an award, runner-up mentions are considered wins in this award tally. For simplification and to avoid errors, each award in this list has been presumed to have had a prior nomination.)
- Wins: 58
- Nominations: 178

American and French actor Timothée Chalamet's major nominations include four Academy Awards, five Golden Globe Awards (winning once), six British Academy Film Awards, nine Actor Awards (winning one), eleven Critics' Choice Movie Awards (winning twice), and a Grammy Award.

After playing minor roles in several films and television shows, Chalamet starred in his first major role as Finn Walden on the television drama series Homeland (2012), for which he was nominated for the Actor Award for Outstanding Performance by an Ensemble in a Drama Series along with the rest of the cast. In 2016, Chalamet starred in John Patrick Shanley's autobiographical play Prodigal Son at Manhattan Theatre Club, for which he was nominated for the Drama League Award for Distinguished Performance and won the Lucille Lortel Award for Outstanding Lead Actor in a Play.

Chalamet's breakthrough role as Elio Perlman in the 2017 acclaimed independent coming-of-age romantic drama Call Me by Your Name earned him an Academy Award nomination for Best Actor, making him the third-youngest nominee in the category and the youngest since Mickey Rooney was nominated aged 19 in 1939 for Babes in Arms. He was also nominated for the BAFTA Award, Critics' Choice Movie Award, Golden Globe Award, and Actor Award for Best Actor. He won acting awards given by the London Film Critics' Circle, New York Film Critics Circle, Los Angeles Film Critics Association, and National Board of Review.

Chalamet also gained recognition for his supporting roles in the 2017 films Lady Bird and Hostiles. The former earned him nominations for the Critics' Choice Movie Award and the Actor Award for Best Ensemble. The following year, he starred as a drug-addicted teenager in the drama Beautiful Boy, for which he received nominations for the BAFTA Award, Critics' Choice Movie Award, Golden Globe Award, and Actor Award for Best Supporting Actor. In 2021, Chalamet received ensemble nominations for the Actor Award and the Critics’ Choice Movie Award for Outstanding Performance by a Cast in a Motion Picture and Best Cast respectively, for his performance in Don't Look Up. In 2023, he received his third Golden Globe nomination, in the category Best Actor in a Motion Picture – Musical or Comedy for his role as a young Willy Wonka in Wonka.

Chalamet's portrayal of Bob Dylan in the 2024 biographical musical drama A Complete Unknown earned him a second Academy Award nomination for Best Actor, making him the third-youngest two-time nominee in the category and the youngest since 24-year-old James Dean. He was nominated for BAFTA, Critics' Choice and Golden Globes, and won the Actor Award for Best Actor, becoming the youngest to do so in the category. He also received his first Grammy Award nomination for the film's soundtrack.

His turn as the ambitious table-tennis player, Marty Mauser, in the 2025 sports comedy film Marty Supreme earned Chalamet another Actor Award nomination for the Outstanding Male Actor in a Leading Role, while also becoming the youngest winner of the Critics' Choice Movie Award for Best Actor and the Golden Globe Award for Best Actor in a Motion Picture – Musical or Comedy at both ceremonies.

== Major associations ==
=== Academy Awards ===
Year	Category	Nominated work	Result	Ref.
2018	Best Actor	Call Me by Your Name	Nominated	
2025	Best Actor	A Complete Unknown	Nominated	
2026	Best Actor	Marty Supreme	Nominated	
2026	Best Picture	Marty Supreme	Nominated	

=== Actor Awards ===
Year	Category	Nominated work	Result	Ref.
2013	Outstanding Ensemble in a Drama Series	Homeland	Nominated	
2018	Outstanding Male Actor in a Leading Role	Call Me by Your Name	Nominated	
2018	Outstanding Cast in a Motion Picture	Lady Bird	Nominated	
2019	Outstanding Male Actor in a Supporting Role	Beautiful Boy	Nominated	
2022	Outstanding Cast in a Motion Picture	Don't Look Up	Nominated	
2025	Outstanding Cast in a Motion Picture	A Complete Unknown	Nominated	
2025	Outstanding Male Actor in a Leading Role	A Complete Unknown	Won	
2026	Outstanding Male Actor in a Leading Role	Marty Supreme	Nominated	
2026	Outstanding Cast in a Motion Picture	Marty Supreme	Nominated	

=== BAFTA Awards ===
Year	Category	Nominated work	Result	Ref.
British Academy Film Awards
2018	Best Actor in a Leading Role	Call Me by Your Name	Nominated	
2018	Rising Star Award	—N/a	Nominated	
2019	Best Actor in a Supporting Role	Beautiful Boy	Nominated	
2025	Best Actor in a Leading Role	A Complete Unknown	Nominated	
2026	Best Actor in a Leading Role	Marty Supreme	Nominated	
2026	Best Film	Marty Supreme	Nominated	

=== Critics' Choice Awards ===
Year	Category	Nominated work	Result	Ref.
Film
2018	Best Actor	Call Me by Your Name	Nominated	
2018	Best Cast	Lady Bird	Nominated	
2019	Best Supporting Actor	Beautiful Boy	Nominated	
2020	Best Cast	Little Women	Nominated	
2022	Best Cast	Don't Look Up	Nominated	
2025	Best Actor	A Complete Unknown	Nominated	
2026	Best Actor	Marty Supreme	Won	
2026	Best Picture	Marty Supreme	Nominated	
Super Awards
2022	Best Actor in a Science Fiction/Fantasy Movie	Dune	Nominated	
2024	Best Actor in a Science Fiction/Fantasy Movie	Wonka	Nominated	
2025	Best Actor in a Science Fiction/Fantasy Movie	Dune: Part Two	Won	

=== Golden Globe Awards ===
Year	Category	Nominated work	Result	Ref.
2018	Best Actor in a Motion Picture – Drama	Call Me by Your Name	Nominated	
2019	Best Supporting Actor – Motion Picture	Beautiful Boy	Nominated	
2024	Best Actor in a Motion Picture – Musical or Comedy	Wonka	Nominated	
2025	Best Actor in a Motion Picture – Drama	A Complete Unknown	Nominated	
2026	Best Actor in a Motion Picture – Musical or Comedy	Marty Supreme	Won	

=== Grammy Awards ===
Year	Category	Nominated work	Result	Ref.
2026	Best Compilation Soundtrack for Visual Media	A Complete Unknown	Nominated	

=== Producers Guild of America Awards ===
Year	Category	Nominated work	Result	Ref.
2026	Best Theatrical Motion Picture	Marty Supreme	Nominated	

== Other awards ==
=== David di Donatello Awards ===
Year	Category	Nominated work	Result	Ref.
2025	David for Cinematic Excellence	—N/a	Honored	

=== Gotham Awards ===
Year	Category	Nominated work	Result	Ref.
Film
2017	Breakthrough Performer	Call Me by Your Name	Won	
2024	Visionary Tribute	A Complete Unknown	Honored (Note: Alongside James Mangold)	

=== Independent Spirit Awards ===
Year	Category	Nominated work	Result	Ref.
2018	Best Male Lead	Call Me by Your Name	Won	
2023	Best Feature	Bones and All	Nominated	

=== Irish Film & Television Awards ===
Year	Category	Nominated work	Result	Ref.
2018	Best International Film Actor	Call Me by Your Name	Nominated	
2025	Best International Film Actor	A Complete Unknown	Nominated	

=== National Board of Review ===
Year	Category	Nominated work	Result	Ref.
2017	Breakthrough Performance	Call Me by Your Name	Won	

=== Satellite Awards ===
Year	Category	Nominated work	Result	Ref.
2019	Best Supporting Actor – Motion Picture	Beautiful Boy	Nominated	
2025	Best Actor in a Motion Picture – Drama	A Complete Unknown	Nominated	
2026	Best Actor in a Motion Picture – Musical or Comedy	Marty Supreme	Won	

=== Believe That Awards ===
Year	Category	Nominated work	Result	Ref.
2025	White Boy of the Year	—N/a	Won	

== Other associations ==
Awards and nominations received by Timothée Chalamet
Award	Year (Note: Indicates the year of ceremony)	Nominated work	Category	Result	Ref.
AACTA Awards	2019	The King	Best Lead Actor – Cinema	Nominated	
AACTA Awards	2024	—	Audience Choice Favourite Actor	Nominated	
AACTA International Awards	2018	Call Me by Your Name	Best International Lead Actor – Cinema	Nominated	
AACTA International Awards	2019	Beautiful Boy	Best International Supporting Actor – Cinema	Nominated	
AACTA International Awards	2026	Marty Supreme	Best Actor	Won	
AARP Movies for Grownups Awards	2025	A Complete Unknown	Best Ensemble	Nominated	
Alliance of Women Film Journalists	2018	Call Me by Your Name	Best Actor	Nominated	
Astra Film Awards	2017	Call Me by Your Name	Best Actor	Nominated	
Astra Film Awards	2024	A Complete Unknown	Best Actor	Won	
Astra Film Awards	2025	Marty Supreme	Best Actor - Comedy or Musical	Won	
Austin Film Critics Association	2018	Call Me by Your Name	Best Actor	Won	
Austin Film Critics Association	2018	Call Me by Your Name	Bobby McCurdy Memorial Breakthrough Artist Award	Won (Note: Also for his work in Lady Bird and Hostiles)	
Austin Film Critics Association	2020	Little Women	Best Ensemble	Nominated	
Austin Film Critics Association	2025	Marty Supreme	Best Actor	Won	
Boston Society of Film Critics	2017	Call Me by Your Name	Best Actor	Runner-up	
Boston Society of Film Critics	2019	Little Women	Best Ensemble	Won	
Boston Society of Film Critics	2024	A Complete Unknown	Best Actor	Won	
Chicago Film Critics Association	2017	Call Me by Your Name	Best Actor	Won	
Chicago Film Critics Association	2017	Call Me by Your Name	Most Promising Performer	Won	
Chicago Film Critics Association	2018	Beautiful Boy	Best Supporting Actor	Nominated	
Chicago Film Critics Association	2024	A Complete Unknown	Best Actor	Nominated	
Chicago Film Critics Association	2025	Marty Supreme	Best Actor	Won	
Dallas–Fort Worth Film Critics Association	2017	Call Me by Your Name	Best Actor	4th place	
Dallas–Fort Worth Film Critics Association	2018	Beautiful Boy	Best Supporting Actor	4th place	
Dallas–Fort Worth Film Critics Association	2024	A Complete Unknown	Best Actor	3rd place	
Dallas–Fort Worth Film Critics Association	2025	Marty Supreme	Best Actor	2nd place	
Detroit Film Critics Society	2017	Call Me by Your Name	Best Actor	Nominated	
Detroit Film Critics Society	2017	Call Me by Your Name	Breakthrough Performance	Nominated	
Detroit Film Critics Society	2017	Lady Bird	Best Ensemble	Nominated	
Dorian Awards	2018	Call Me by Your Name	Film Male Lead Performance of the Year	Won	
Dorian Awards	2018	—	Rising Star of the Year	Won	
Dorian Awards	2019	Beautiful Boy	Film Supporting Male Performance of the Year	Nominated	
Dorian Awards	2025	Marty Supreme	Film Performance of the Year	Nominated	
Drama League Awards	2016	Prodigal Son	Distinguished Performance Award	Nominated	
Dublin Film Critics' Circle	2017	Call Me by Your Name	Best Actor	4th place	
Empire Awards	2018	Call Me by Your Name	Best Male Newcomer	Nominated	
Florida Film Critics Circle	2017	Call Me by Your Name	Best Actor	Won	
Florida Film Critics Circle	2017	Call Me by Your Name	Pauline Kael Breakout Award	Won	
Florida Film Critics Circle	2017	Lady Bird	Best Ensemble	Nominated	
Florida Film Critics Circle	2019	Little Women	Best Ensemble	Won	
Florida Film Critics Circle	2025	Marty Supreme	Best Actor	Nominated	
Georgia Film Critics Association	2018	Call Me by Your Name	Best Actor	Nominated	
Georgia Film Critics Association	2018	Call Me by Your Name	Breakthrough Award	Nominated (Note: Also for his work in Lady Bird, Hot Summer Nights, and Hostiles)	
Georgia Film Critics Association	2018	Lady Bird	Best Ensemble	Nominated	
Georgia Film Critics Association	2019	Beautiful Boy	Best Supporting Actor	Nominated	
Georgia Film Critics Association	2020	Little Women	Best Ensemble	Won	
Georgia Film Critics Association	2024	A Complete Unknown	Best Actor	Nominated	
Georgia Film Critics Association	2025	Marty Supreme	Best Actor	Won	
Georgia Film Critics Association	2025	Marty Supreme	Best Ensemble	Nominated	
Hollywood Film Awards	2017	Call Me by Your Name	Hollywood Breakout Actor Award	Won	
Hollywood Film Awards	2018	Beautiful Boy	Hollywood Supporting Actor Award	Won	
Houston Film Critics Society	2018	Call Me by Your Name	Best Actor	Nominated	
Houston Film Critics Society	2019	Beautiful Boy	Best Supporting Actor	Nominated	
Houston Film Critics Society	2025	A Complete Unknown	Best Actor	Nominated	
Houston Film Critics Society	2026	Marty Supreme	Best Actor	Nominated	
Houston Film Critics Society	2026	Marty Supreme	Best Ensemble	Nominated	
IndieWire Critics Poll	2017	Call Me by Your Name	Best Actor	Won	
IndieWire Critics Poll	2019	Little Women	Best Supporting Actor	15th place	
IndieWire Critics Poll	2025	Marty Supreme	Best Performance	5th place	
International Cinephile Society	2018	Call Me by Your Name	Best Actor	Won	
International Cinephile Society	2018	Call Me by Your Name	Best Ensemble	Nominated	
International Cinephile Society	2018	Lady Bird	Best Ensemble	Runner-up	
International Cinephile Society	2020	Little Women	Best Ensemble	Nominated	
International Cinephile Society	2026	Marty Supreme	Best Actor	Nominated	
Kansas City Film Critics Circle	2017	Call Me by Your Name	Best Actor	Won	
Kansas City Film Critics Circle	2018	Beautiful Boy	Best Supporting Actor	Nominated	
Kansas City Film Critics Circle	2025	A Complete Unknown	Best Actor	Nominated	
Kansas City Film Critics Circle	2025	Dune: Part Two	Best Actor	Nominated	
Kansas City Film Critics Circle	2026	Marty Supreme	Best Actor	Nominated	
Las Vegas Film Critics Society	2024	A Complete Unknown	Best Actor	Nominated	
Las Vegas Film Critics Society	2025	Marty Supreme	Best Actor	Won	
London Film Critics' Circle	2018	Call Me by Your Name	Actor of the Year	Won	
London Film Critics' Circle	2025	A Complete Unknown	Actor of the Year	Nominated	
London Film Critics' Circle	2026	Marty Supreme	Actor of the Year	Won	
Los Angeles Film Critics Association	2017	Call Me by Your Name	Best Actor	Won	
Los Angeles Film Critics Association	2025	Marty Supreme	Best Lead Performance	Runner-up	
Lucille Lortel Awards	2016	Prodigal Son	Outstanding Lead Actor in a Play	Won	
MTV Movie & TV Awards	2018	Call Me by Your Name	Best Performance in a Movie	Nominated	
MTV Movie & TV Awards	2022	Dune	Best Performance in a Movie	Nominated	
National Society of Film Critics	2018	Call Me by Your Name	Best Actor	3rd place	
New York Film Critics Circle	2017	Call Me by Your Name	Best Actor	Won	
New York Film Critics Online	2017	Call Me by Your Name	Breakthrough Performer	Won	
New York Film Critics Online	2024	A Complete Unknown	Best Actor	Nominated	
New York Film Critics Online	2025	Marty Supreme	Best Actor	Runner-up	
Nickelodeon Kids' Choice Awards	2024	Wonka	Favorite Movie Actor	Won	
Online Film Critics Society	2017	Lady Bird	Best Ensemble	Nominated	
Online Film Critics Society	2017	Call Me by Your Name	Breakout Star of the Year	Won	
Online Film Critics Society	2017	Call Me by Your Name	Best Actor	Nominated	
Online Film Critics Society	2025	A Complete Unknown	Best Actor	Nominated	
Online Film Critics Society	2026	Marty Supreme	Best Actor	Nominated	
Online Film Critics Society	2026	Marty Supreme	Best Ensemble & Casting	Nominated	
Palm Springs International Film Festival	2018	Call Me by Your Name	Rising Star Award	Won	
Palm Springs International Film Festival	2019	Beautiful Boy	Spotlight Award	Won	
Palm Springs International Film Festival	2025	A Complete Unknown	Chairman Award	Honored	
Palm Springs International Film Festival	2026	Marty Supreme	Spotlight Actor of the Year Award	Won	
People's Choice Awards	2021	Dune	The Drama Movie Star of 2021	Nominated	
People's Choice Awards	2024	Wonka	The Movie Star of The Year	Nominated	
People's Choice Awards	2024	Wonka	The Comedy Star of The Year	Nominated	
San Diego Film Critics Society	2017	Call Me by Your Name	Breakthrough Artist	Won	
San Diego Film Critics Society	2017	Call Me by Your Name	Best Actor	Nominated	
San Diego Film Critics Society	2017	Lady Bird	Best Ensemble	Nominated	
San Diego Film Critics Society	2018	Beautiful Boy	Best Supporting Actor	Won (Note: Tied with Richard E. Grant for Can You Ever Forgive Me?)	
San Diego Film Critics Society	2024	A Complete Unknown	Best Actor	Nominated	
San Diego Film Critics Society	2025	Marty Supreme	Best Actor	Nominated	
San Francisco Bay Area Film Critics Circle	2017	Call Me by Your Name	Best Actor	Nominated	
San Francisco Bay Area Film Critics Circle	2024	A Complete Unknown	Best Actor	Nominated	
Santa Barbara International Film Festival	2017	Call Me by Your Name	Virtuosos Award	Won	
Santa Barbara International Film Festival	2025	—	Arlington Award	Honored	
Saturn Awards	2022	Dune	Best Actor	Nominated	
Saturn Awards	2025	Dune: Part Two	Best Actor	Nominated	
Seattle Film Critics Society	2017	Call Me by Your Name	Best Ensemble	Nominated	
Seattle Film Critics Society	2017	Lady Bird	Best Ensemble	Nominated	
Seattle Film Critics Society	2019	Little Women	Best Ensemble	Nominated	
Seattle Film Critics Society	2025	Marty Supreme	Best Ensemble	Nominated	
Seattle Film Critics Society	2025	Marty Supreme	Best Actor In a Leading Role	Nominated	
St. Louis Film Critics Association	2018	Beautiful Boy	Best Supporting Actor	Nominated	
St. Louis Film Critics Association	2024	A Complete Unknown	Best Actor	Nominated	
St. Louis Film Critics Association	2025	Marty Supreme	Best Actor	Runner-up	
Teen Choice Awards	2018	Lady Bird	Choice Drama Movie Actor	Nominated	
Toronto Film Critics Association	2017	Call Me by Your Name	Best Actor	Runner-up	
Vancouver Film Critics Circle	2017	Call Me by Your Name	Best Actor	Nominated	
Vancouver Film Critics Circle	2024	A Complete Unknown	Best Actor	Won	
Vancouver Film Critics Circle	2025	Marty Supreme	Best Actor	Won	
Village Voice Film Poll	2018	Call Me by Your Name	Best Lead Performance	2nd place	
Washington D.C. Area Film Critics Association	2017	Call Me by Your Name	Best Actor	Nominated	
Washington D.C. Area Film Critics Association	2018	Beautiful Boy	Best Supporting Actor	Nominated	
Washington D.C. Area Film Critics Association	2019	Little Women	Best Ensemble	Nominated	
Washington D.C. Area Film Critics Association	2024	A Complete Unknown	Best Actor	Nominated	
Washington D.C. Area Film Critics Association	2025	Marty Supreme	Best Actor	Nominated	
Women Film Critics Circle	2017	Call Me by Your Name	Best Actor	Nominated	
Women Film Critics Circle	2025	Marty Supreme	Best Actor	Runner-up	

== See also ==
- List of French Academy Award winners and nominees
- List of Jewish Academy Award winners and nominees
- List of actors with Academy Award nominations
