= Timothée Chalamet =

American and French actor (born 1995)

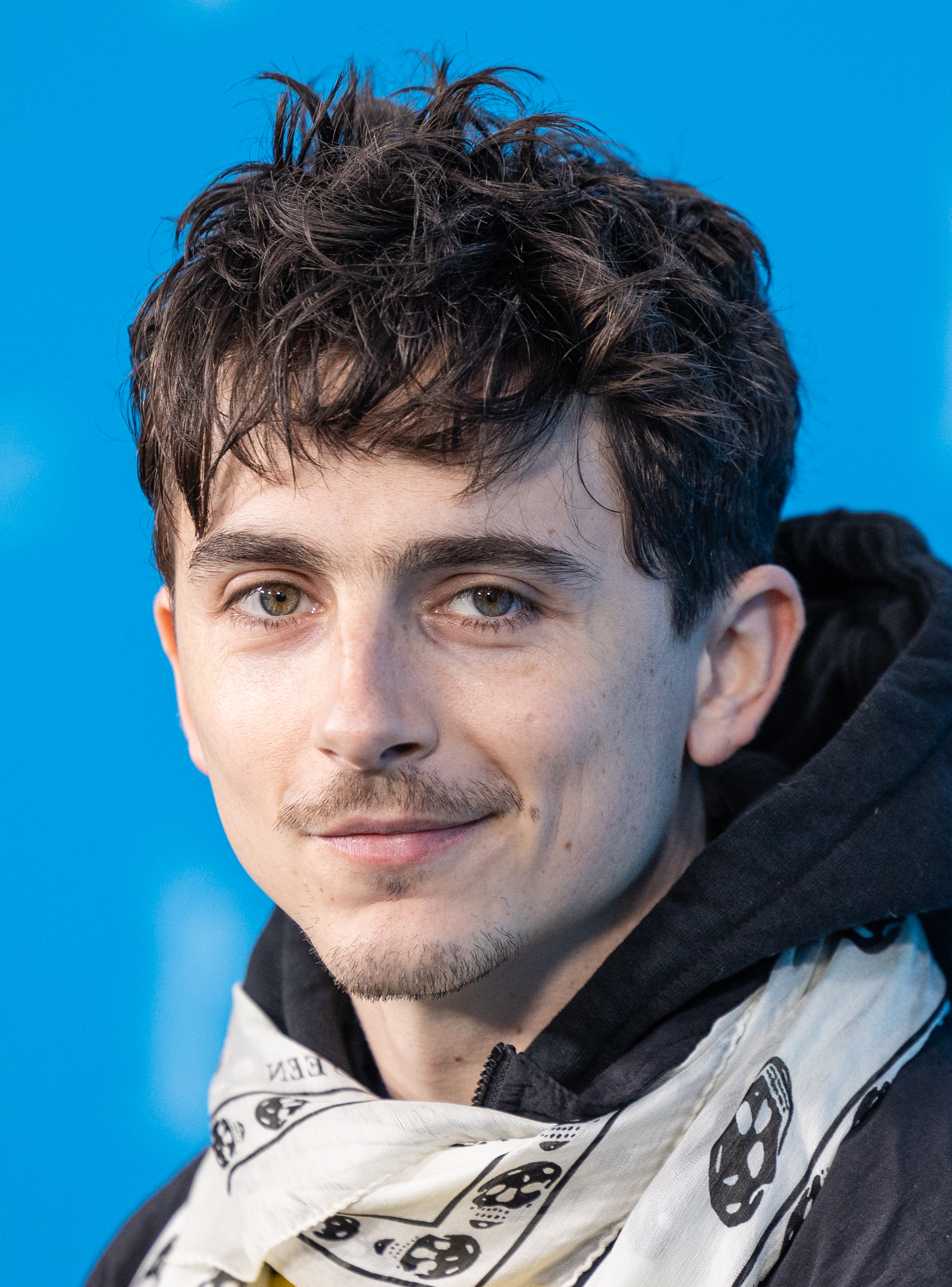
- Chalamet in 2025
- Born: Timothée Hal Chalamet; December 27, 1995 (age 30); New York City, U.S.
- Citizenship: United States; France
- Occupation: Actor
- Years active: 2007–present
- Works: Full list
- Partner: Kylie Jenner (2023–present)
- Relatives: Pauline Chalamet (sister); Rodman Flender (uncle)
- Awards: Full list

Timothée Hal Chalamet (Note: English: /ˈtɪməθi ˈʃæləmeɪ/ TIM-əth-ee SHAL-ə-may. When speaking English, Chalamet uses the pronunciation of "Timothy", as he finds approximating the French pronunciation [timɔte ʃalame] pretentious and "too much of an obligation".) (born December 27, 1995) is an American and French actor. Known for his work in a diverse range of films, he is the recipient of numerous accolades including an Actor Award, a Golden Globe Award, and two Critics' Choice Awards, in addition to nominations for four Academy Awards, six BAFTAs, and a Grammy Award. His films as a leading actor have grossed over US$2.3 billion worldwide.

Chalamet began his career in television, appearing in the drama series Homeland. In 2014, while a student at Columbia University, he made his film debut in the comedy-drama Men, Women & Children and appeared in Christopher Nolan's science fiction film Interstellar. Chalamet came to international attention with the lead role of a lovestruck teenager in Luca Guadagnino's coming-of-age film Call Me by Your Name (2017), earning him his first nomination for the Academy Award for Best Actor, and becoming the third-youngest nominee in the category. He gained further recognition for his supporting roles in Greta Gerwig's films Lady Bird (2017) and Little Women (2019), as well as for portraying Nic Sheff in the biopic Beautiful Boy (2018).

Chalamet began leading big-budget films, starring as Paul Atreides in Denis Villeneuve's Dune trilogy and Willy Wonka in the musical fantasy film Wonka (2023). He earned consecutive Academy Award nominations for his portrayal of Bob Dylan in the biographical drama A Complete Unknown (2024) and his starring role as a table tennis player in Josh Safdie's sports comedy film Marty Supreme (2025). The former also earned him the SAG Award for Best Actor, while the latter won him the Critics' Choice Award and Golden Globe Award for Best Actor, making him the youngest recipient of each award.

On stage, Chalamet starred in John Patrick Shanley's autobiographical play Prodigal Son in 2016, for which he won a Lucille Lortel Award and gained a nomination for a Drama League Award. Offscreen, he has been labeled as a sex symbol and a fashion icon.

== Early life ==
Timothée Hal Chalamet was born on December 27, 1995, and grew up in the New York City neighborhood of Hell's Kitchen. He and his parents lived in a rental apartment in Manhattan Plaza, a federally subsidized building reserved for artists under the Mitchell–Lama program. (Note: Attributed to multiple references:) His mother, Nicole Flender, is of half Russian Jewish and half Austrian Jewish descent. She has worked as a Broadway dancer, dance teacher and French teacher, and is currently a real estate agent. (Note: Attributed to multiple references:) Chalamet's father, Marc Chalamet, is from Nîmes, France. He is a New York correspondent for the Paris newspaper Le Parisien and an editor for UNICEF. (Note: Attributed to multiple references:) Chalamet's paternal grandmother was originally from Brantford, Ontario. On his mother's side, Chalamet is a nephew of Rodman Flender and Amy Lippman, a husband-and-wife filmmaking duo. His older sister, Pauline Chalamet, is an actress, and has described their family as being "very middle-class".

Chalamet is bilingual in English and French, (Note: On The Graham Norton Show, Chalamet said that his French, while fluent, is "not perfect".) and holds dual United States and French citizenship. Growing up, Chalamet spent summers in Le Chambon-sur-Lignon, a small French village two hours from Lyon, at the home of his paternal grandparents. He attended PS 87 William T. Sherman School for elementary school, and MS 245 The Computer School for middle school, later transferring to the selective Delta program at MS 54 Booker T. Washington Middle School. He described his experience at the school as "miserable" due to the lack of a creative outlet within the school's academically rigorous environment.

Heath Ledger's performance as the Joker in The Dark Knight (2008) inspired Chalamet to pursue a career in acting, and he applied to Fiorello H. LaGuardia High School of Music & Art and Performing Arts. Although his application was rejected based on his interview, a drama teacher was so impressed by his audition that he insisted on Chalamet's acceptance to the school. The teacher, who would later instruct Chalamet during his sophomore year, said he gave Chalamet the highest score he had ever given a prospective student. During high school, Chalamet dated Madonna's daughter Lourdes Leon, a fellow student, for a year. He starred in school musicals as Emcee in Cabaret and Oscar Lindquist in Sweet Charity, and graduated in 2013. Chalamet is also a YoungArts alumnus.

Chalamet attended Columbia University for a year, majoring in cultural anthropology. (Note: Attributed to multiple references:) He later transferred to New York University's Gallatin School of Individualized Study to pursue his acting career more freely, having found it difficult to assimilate into Columbia after filming Interstellar. He eventually dropped out of New York University to focus on his acting career and avoid student debt.

== Career ==
=== 2008–2016: Early roles ===
As a child, Chalamet appeared in several commercials and acted in two horror short films called Sweet Tooth and Clown, before making his television debut on an episode of the long-running police procedural series Law & Order (2009), playing a murder victim. This was followed by a minor role in the television film Loving Leah (2009). In 2011, Chalamet made his stage debut in the Off-Broadway play The Talls, a coming-of-age comedy set in the 1970s, in which he played a sexually curious 12-year-old. The chief theatre critic of New York Daily News wrote: "Chalamet hilariously captures a tween's awakening curiosities about sex." In 2012, he had recurring roles in the drama series Royal Pains and the thriller series Homeland, in which Chalamet played Finn Walden, the rebellious son of the Vice President. Along with the rest of the cast, he was nominated for a SAG Award for Best Ensemble.

In 2014, Chalamet made his feature film debut in a minor role in Jason Reitman's Men, Women & Children. That same year, he played the role of Tom Cooper, the son of Matthew McConaughey's character, in Christopher Nolan's Interstellar. The film received positive reviews, with critics praising the cast's performances, and grossed over $700 million worldwide. A decade later, Chalamet stated that Interstellar was his favorite film he had ever been in up to that point, but shared that at the time he was disappointed because it didn't boost his career as he had assumed it would. Also in 2014, Chalamet had a supporting role in Worst Friends, a comedy which had a limited theatrical release and received positive reviews.

In 2015, Chalamet co-starred in Andrew Droz Palermo's fantasy thriller One & Two, which premiered at the Berlin International Film Festival, where it received mixed reviews, before its limited theatrical release. His next role was playing the teenage version of James Franco's character, Stephen Elliott, in Pamela Romanowsky's The Adderall Diaries. In his final role of 2015, Chalamet played Charlie Cooper, the sullen grandson of Diane Keaton and John Goodman's characters in the Christmas comedy Love the Coopers, which received negative reviews.

In 2016, Chalamet starred as Jim Quinn in the autobiographical play Prodigal Son at Manhattan Theatre Club. Handpicked by its playwright and director John Patrick Shanley and producer Scott Rudin, Chalamet portrayed a younger Shanley, a misfit Bronx kid in a prestigious New Hampshire prep school set in 1963. His performance was praised and won him the Lucille Lortel Award for Outstanding Lead Actor in a Play, in addition to a nomination for the Drama League Award for Distinguished Performance. Chalamet also co-starred opposite Lily Rabe in Julia Hart's Miss Stevens as the troubled student Billy Mitman. Stephen Farber of The Hollywood Reporter described Chalamet's act as "compelling" and "startling", with his character's speech from Death of a Salesman as among the best he has ever seen. Stephen Holden of The New York Times compared him to James Dean.

=== 2017–2020: Breakthrough ===
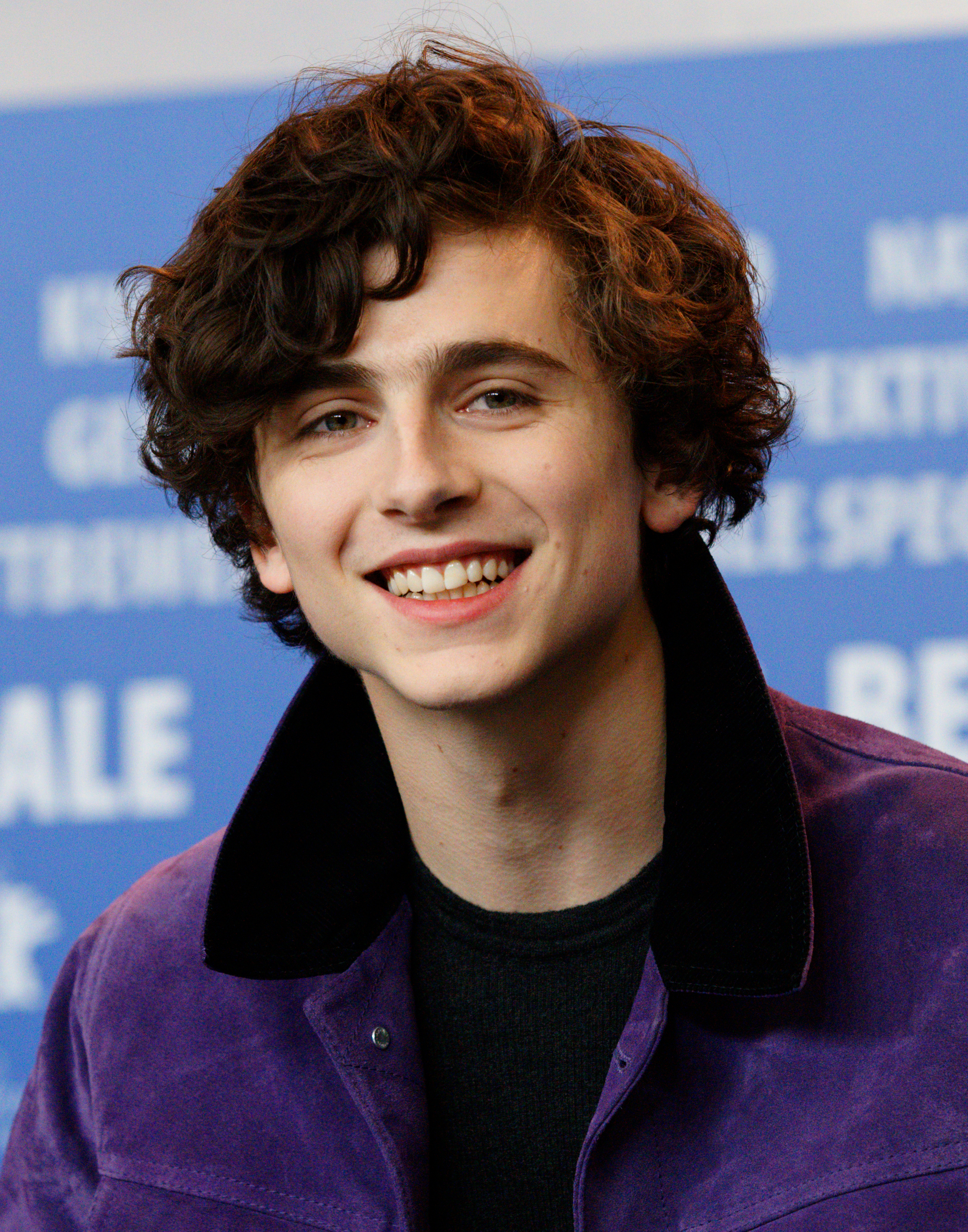
Chalamet at the 2017 Berlin International Film Festival

After being attached to the project for three years, Chalamet starred in Luca Guadagnino's Call Me by Your Name, based on the novel of the same name by André Aciman. The story revolves around Elio Perlman, a young man living in Italy during the 1980s, who falls in love with Oliver (Armie Hammer), a university student who has come to stay with his family. In preparation, Chalamet learned to speak Italian, as well as to play the piano and guitar. Call Me by Your Name premiered at the 2017 Sundance Film Festival to critical acclaim; critics particularly highlighted Chalamet's performance.

Olly Richards of Empire wrote: "In a film in which every performance is terrific, Chalamet makes the rest look like they're acting. He alone would make the film worth watching". Jon Frosch of The Hollywood Reporter stated that no performance during the year "felt as emotionally, physically and intellectually alive" and included Chalamet in the magazine's list of the best performances of the year. Time and The New York Times also featured him in such lists. He won the Gotham Independent Film Award for Breakthrough Performer and the Independent Spirit Award for Best Male Lead, and received nominations for the Critics' Choice Movie Award, Golden Globe Award, Actor Award, BAFTA Award, and Academy Award, all for Best Actor. He is the third-youngest person to be nominated for an Academy Award for Best Actor as well as the youngest since Mickey Rooney in Babes in Arms in 1939.

In his second film of 2017, Chalamet played Daniel, a gawky teenager who gets swept up in the drug-dealing business throughout a summer, in Elijah Bynum's directorial debut, Hot Summer Nights. It received a limited theatrical release the following year and generated mixed reviews from critics, though Chalamet received praise from K. Austin Collins of Vanity Fair, who called the "sensitivity" in his performance "something special". Later that year, he played Kyle Scheible, a rich hipster in a band and a love interest of Saoirse Ronan's character in Lady Bird, the solo directorial debut of Greta Gerwig. Critics praised the ensemble cast, with Ty Burr of The Boston Globe taking particular note of Chalamet's "hilarious" performance. In his final film of 2017, Scott Cooper's western Hostiles, Chalamet played a young soldier named Philippe DeJardin, alongside Christian Bale.

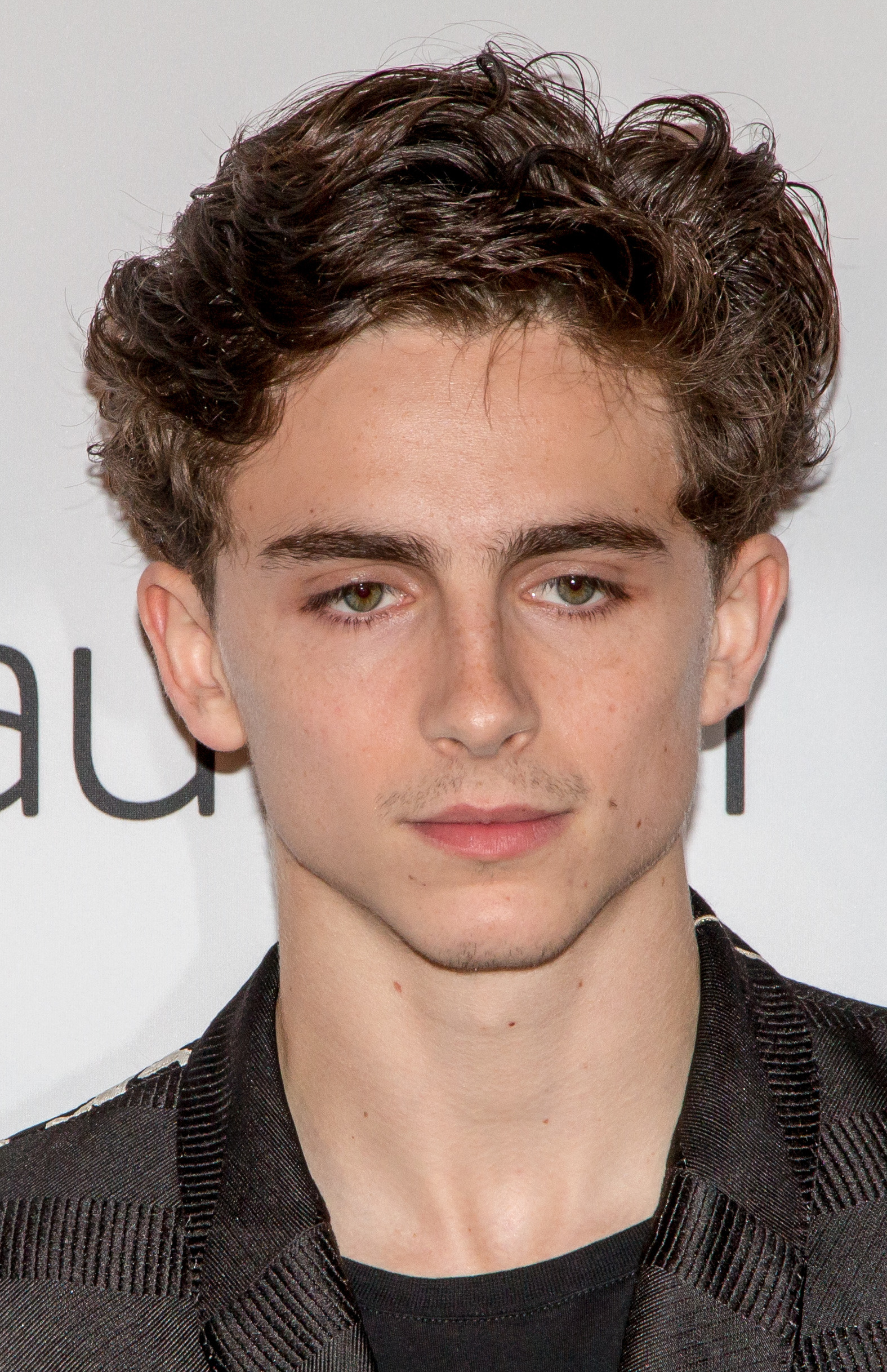
Chalamet at the 2018 Toronto International Film Festival

In 2018, Chalamet joined the Academy of Motion Picture Arts and Sciences. Later that year, Chalamet portrayed Nic Sheff, a teenager addicted to methamphetamine who shares a strained relationship with his father, the journalist David Sheff (portrayed by Steve Carell), in the drama Beautiful Boy. Directed by Felix Van Groeningen, the film is based on a pair of memoirs—the elder Sheff's memoir of the same name and Tweak: Growing Up on Methamphetamines by Nic Sheff. Owen Gleiberman of Variety drew comparisons with Chalamet's performance in Call Me by Your Name, stating that "Nic, in his muffled millennial James Dean way, [as] skittery and self-involved" is a transformation from the "marvelous directness" he displayed in the role of Elio Perlman. He received nominations for Best Supporting Actor at the Golden Globe, Actor, and BAFTA award ceremonies.

The following year, Chalamet starred in Woody Allen's romantic comedy A Rainy Day in New York. The Me Too movement prompted a resurgence of the 1992 sexual abuse allegation against Allen. Chalamet said he was unable to answer questions about working with Allen due to his contractual obligations; the Huffington Post obtained a copy of Chalamet's contract which disputed this. Chalamet donated his salary to the charities Time's Up, LGBT Center of New York, and RAINN, and did not promote the film. Allen claimed in his 2020 memoir Apropos of Nothing that Chalamet told Allen's sister Letty Aronson that he only denounced him in an attempt to improve his chances of winning an Academy Award for Call Me by Your Name.

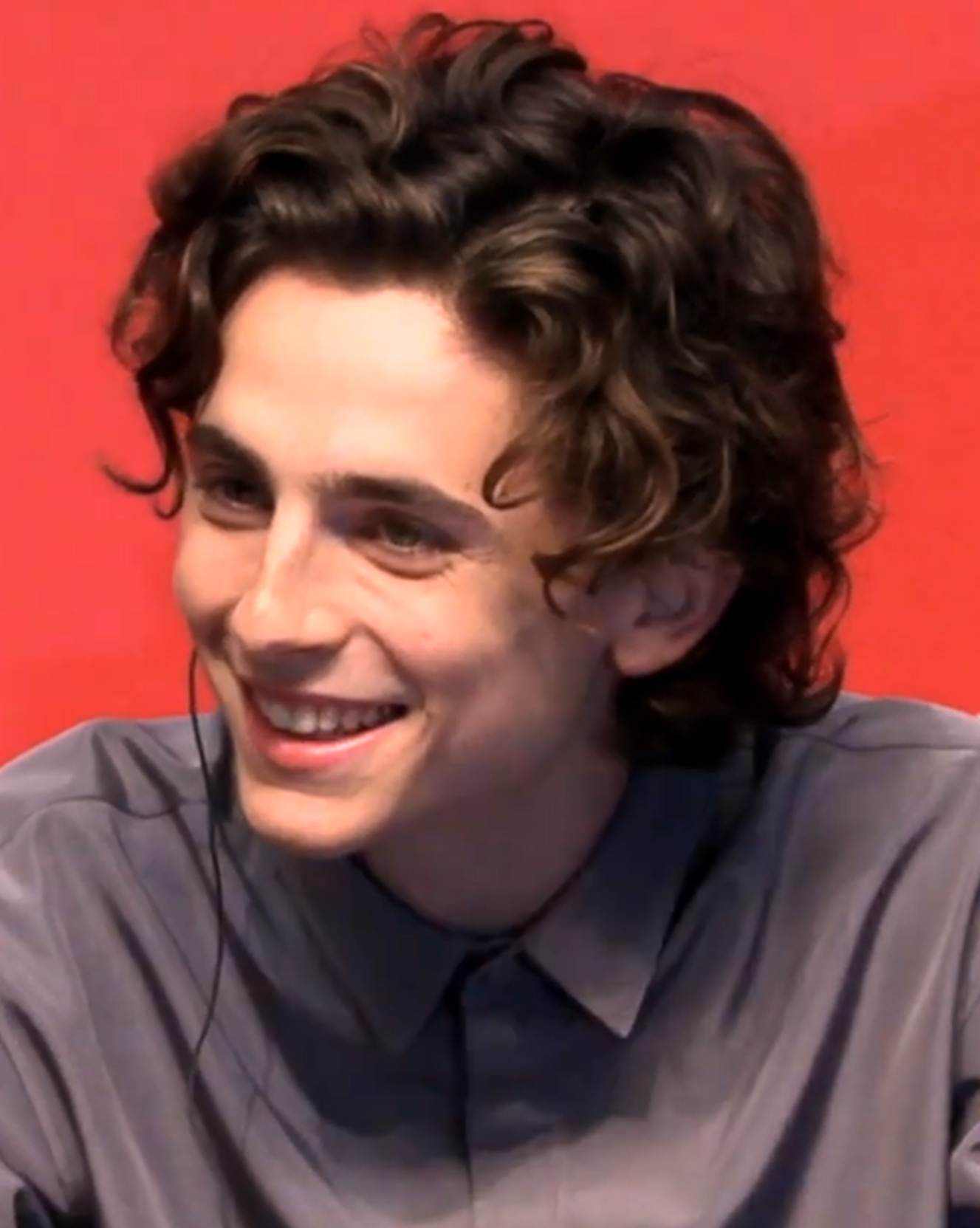
Chalamet at the 24th Busan International Film Festival of the King in 2019

Chalamet next portrayed Henry V of England, a prince who, as a young man, becomes King of England, in David Michôd's Netflix period drama The King, based on several plays from Shakespeare's Henriad. Richard Lawson of Vanity Fair wrote, "Chalamet does robust work, straightening his lanky posture as he goes, rising up into the role like a man ascendant". In his third film release of 2019, Chalamet portrayed Theodore "Laurie" Laurence, a lovestruck teenager, in Little Women, an adaptation of Louisa May Alcott's novel of the same name. Marking his second collaboration with Gerwig and Ronan, the film was acclaimed by critics, two of whom—Peter Travers of Rolling Stone and Ann Hornaday of The Washington Post—also praised Chalamet's performance; Travers noted that the actor portrays the role with "innate charm and poignant vulnerability", while Hornaday highlighted his "languidly graceful" performance and its "playful physicality". Chalamet hosted an episode of the sketch comedy series Saturday Night Live in 2020.

=== 2021–present: Established actor ===
In 2021, Chalamet portrayed a student revolutionary in Wes Anderson's ensemble comedy-drama The French Dispatch. The film had its world premiere at the 2021 Cannes Film Festival, where it generated positive reviews. Anderson wrote the role with Chalamet in mind. Brianna Zigler of Paste found him to be "perfectly attuned to Anderson's highly specified wavelength". Chalamet starred as the main character Paul Atreides in Denis Villeneuve's film adaptation of the science fiction novel Dune, which premiered at the 78th Venice International Film Festival. Villeneuve stated that Chalamet was his only choice to play the role: "I needed that for the audience to believe this young man will be able to lead a whole planet." Chalamet received positive reviews for his performance, with The Hollywood Reporter's David Rooney praising his "magnetic pensiveness [that] gives the coming-of-age element some heart" and Lewis Knight of Daily Mirror writing that "Timothée Chalamet completes his ascension to Hollywood leading man status". Dune earned over $400 million worldwide to emerge as one of the year's highest-grossing films. Chalamet later expressed slight criticism of his performance in the film, stating: "I felt kind of thrown by the futurism. I was coming off Beautiful Boy and Call Me by Your Name and movies that were a lot more naturalistic, and this was a huge movie, so I felt intimidated." In his final role of the year, Chalamet played a skater punk in Adam McKay's Netflix ensemble comedy film Don't Look Up. It received mixed reviews from critics. Justin Chang of the Los Angeles Times found Chalamet "sweetly sincere" in his small part. The ensemble cast of the film was nominated for an Actor Award.

Chalamet reunited with Guadagnino in the road film Bones and All (2022), in which he starred alongside Taylor Russell as cannibal drifters. The project marked his first production venture, and Chalamet credited Guadagnino for mentoring him through the process. Bones and All premiered at the 79th Venice International Film Festival. Leila Latif of IndieWire praised the chemistry between Chalamet and Russell and took note of his "near-peerless ability to gently weep", and Jon Frosch of The Hollywood Reporter added that "Chalamet reminded us why he's the best actor of his generation". That same year, Chalamet lent his voice to the Netflix adult animated musical special Entergalactic.

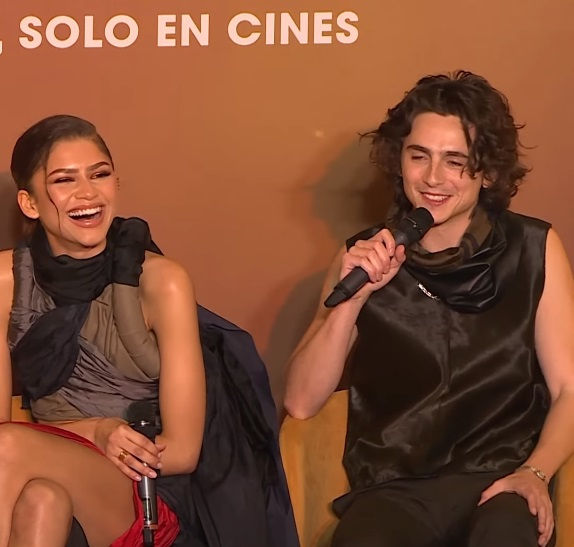
Zendaya and Chalamet promoting Dune: Part Two in 2024

In 2023, Chalamet hosted Saturday Night Live for a second time. He then portrayed Willy Wonka in the musical film Wonka, directed by Paul King, for which Chalamet was paid $9 million. He was King's only choice for the role, stating that he cast the actor without an audition after seeing his high school performances on YouTube that proved his singing and dancing skills. Chalamet sang seven songs for the film's soundtrack. Slant Magazine's Derek Smith commended Chalamet for "imbuing Wonka [with] a warmth and tenderness that's in perfect unison with the vibrant and bizarre world that King creates here". His performance earned him another nomination for a Golden Globe Award for Best Actor. Wonka grossed over $634 million worldwide to rank as the eighth highest-grossing film of 2023. Chalamet went on to express that he made the film partially because he was a fan of King's Paddington films and added: "I would say the riskiest thing (I ever made) was Wonka. ... I felt it was an untraditional career step wherein I had done serious movies already ... I feel like that movie didn't get its fair shake. Even though it was financially successful... it felt like there were 'codes of coolness' ... I honestly thought it was kinda punk rock to do something that wasn't so cool but I don't think people really took it that way."

The following year, Chalamet reprised the role of Paul Atreides in the sequel to Dune, titled Dune: Part Two. Variety reported that the box-office success of Wonka and Dune: Part Two established Chalamet as a major star. Soon after, he signed a first look deal with the studio Warner Bros. to star in and produce more films. Dune: Part Two grossed over $714 million worldwide to rank as the highest-grossing film with Chalamet in a starring role and the seventh highest-grossing film of 2024. In his second project of the year, Chalamet produced and portrayed Bob Dylan in the biopic A Complete Unknown, directed by James Mangold. It was filmed and released in 2024, five years after he began preparing to play the part. Chalamet first met with the film producers shortly after he had finished filming Call Me By Your Name, as they were struck by his versatility and physical resemblance to the artist. Dylan himself responded positively to Chalamet's casting. To stay immersed in the role, Chalamet remained aloof on set and was referred to as "Bob Dylan" on the call sheet. Even so, he did not deem it method acting. For the film's accompanying soundtrack, he sang 40 Dylan songs, while also playing guitars and harmonicas. BBC Culture's Caryn James wrote that Chalamet "is brilliant here and completely believable, better than the film itself. He sings and plays guitar and harmonica with apparent ease, and creates a thoroughly convincing avatar of Dylan". He received nominations for the Academy, BAFTA, and Golden Globe for Best Actor, and became the youngest person to win the Actor Award for Best Actor, at age 29. Chalamet further received a Grammy Award nomination for his work on the film's soundtrack.

In 2025, in addition to hosting Saturday Night Live for the third time, Chalamet also performed three Dylan songs on the show as its musical guest, becoming the first non-pro singer to fill the role in 30 years. That same year, he played a character inspired by Marty Reisman in the sports film Marty Supreme, directed by Josh Safdie, which he also produced. Safdie first approached him about the film in 2018, and stated that he had written it specifically for him. That same year, Chalamet began taking ping-pong lessons, practicing while filming other projects. The film was praised by critics. The Independent's Clarisse Loughrey wrote that Chalamet is "truly one of our greatest talents" and compared his energy in the film to that of Al Pacino, while David Ehrlich of IndieWire said he "makes one of the most colossal movie performances of the 21st century seem as natural as a lay-up". For his work on the film as an actor and producer, he received two Academy Award nominations for Best Actor and Best Picture respectively, becoming both the youngest male actor to be nominated in the lead category thrice since Marlon Brando in 1954 and the youngest person ever to be nominated twice for acting and producing in the same year. Chalamet further earned his ninth Actor Award and sixth BAFTA Award nominations, while also becoming the youngest ever winner of the Critics' Choice Movie Award for Best Actor and the Golden Globe Award for Best Actor in a Motion Picture – Musical or Comedy.

==== Upcoming ====
In 2026, he will reprise his role as Paul Atreides in the last installment of the Dune film trilogy, titled Dune: Part Three. Chalamet contrasted his performance in this film with his performance in the first film, stating: "I was more intense on the third one. It felt like that was the natural momentum, so I wanted to push against that as hard as I could... (For example) On Dune 3, as opposed to the first movie, I came out early and studied the control panel (of the ornithopter) — all sorts of hieroglyphics and things that aren't tethered to reality. I wanted to know what each button did, and invent a dynamic for myself with it." Dune: Part Three will release on December 18, 2026. He will next star alongside Selena Gomez in Illumination's animated sci-fi/romantic comedy film Not Alone, set for release on April 16, 2027.

Chalamet is also set to reunite with Mangold for High-Side, a motocross heist film. He would reportedly earn $25 million for his participation in the film. He is also attached, alongside manager Brian Swardstrom, to produce a film adaptation of Richard Powers' 2024 book Playground.

== Public image and fashion ==
Several media publications consider Chalamet to be among the most talented actors of his generation. Remarking upon his performance in Beautiful Boy, Kenneth Turan of the Los Angeles Times wrote that "he might be the male actor of his generation." In 2018, he appeared in Forbes's 30 Under 30 Hollywood & Entertainment list. In 2026 Variety named him one of the 100 Greatest Movie Stars of All Time.

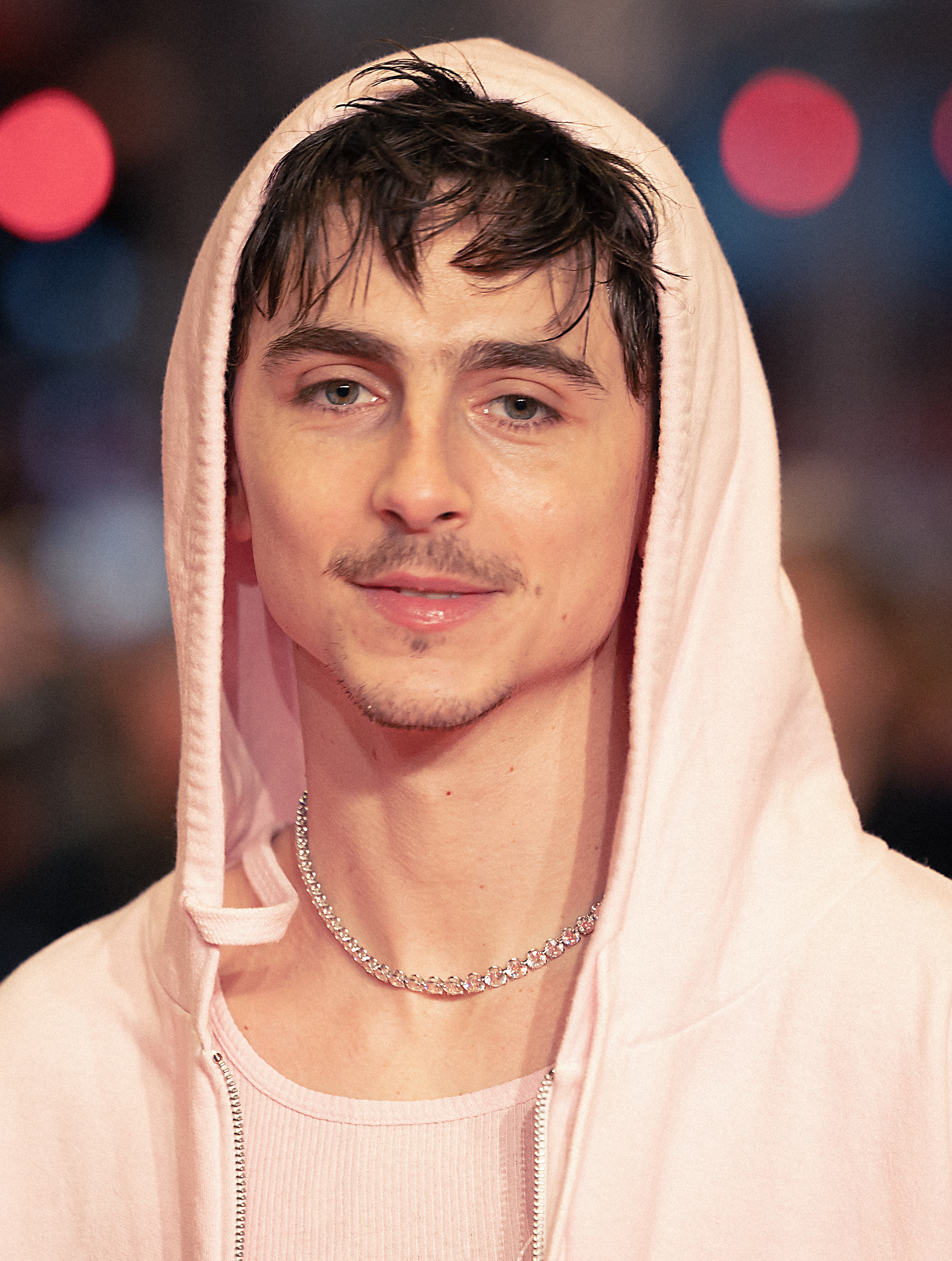
Chalamet at the 2025 Berlin International Film Festival

Chalamet has been described by the media as a sex symbol and a fashion icon, with his hair, jawline, and androgynous looks highlighted as his trademarks. The New York Times grouped Chalamet into a label it called "noodle boys", noted for their "sinewy" appearance and who served as an "alternative image of white masculinity" in American pop culture. Vogue named Chalamet the most influential man in fashion in 2019 and credits him for continuing "to ply the boundary between traditional masculinity and femininity," writing "those fashion choices are all the more impressive considering that Chalamet styles himself." In 2020, Men's magazine GQ ranked Chalamet as the best-dressed man in the world, and in 2023, he was voted Most Stylish Man of The Year by GQ's readers. He briefly attended a Timothée Chalamet look-alike contest in Washington Square Park in late 2024, kickstarting a large increase in the prevalence of celebrity look-alike contests that year. Chalamet has a strong fan presence online, most notably Club Chalamet, a woman who runs a dedicated fan account for him.

Chalamet served as one of the co-chairs of the 2021 Met Gala, alongside singer Billie Eilish, professional tennis player Naomi Osaka and poet Amanda Gorman. The event was part of the Costume Institute's exhibit In America: A Lexicon of Fashion. Later that year, Chalamet became a brand ambassador for Cartier. He also collaborated with Haider Ackermann to design a hoodie with 100% of the proceeds going to French organization Afghanistan Libre, which is centered around preserving the rights of women in Afghanistan. They first met in Paris in 2017 at the request of Chalamet's agent Brian Swardstrom, who wanted Ackermann to style him for his first red carpet, at that year's Berlin International Film Festival. They have since maintained a close friendship and creative partnership. Chalamet also had a close relationship with late designer Virgil Abloh.

At the 94th Academy Awards, Chalamet wore a sequined Louis Vuitton jacket from Nicolas Ghesquière's womenswear collection without a shirt; W declared that he had "rewritten the gentleman's Oscar dress code for good", highlighting the boundary-pushing outfit that "blurred the lines of fashion's traditional gender divide". He subsequently appeared on the cover of the October 2022 print edition of British Vogue, becoming the first solo male to do so in the magazine's history.

Chalamet was the face of Chanel's men's fragrance Bleu de Chanel from 2023 to 2026, taking over from the late French actor Gaspard Ulliel. The advertising campaign starring Chalamet and shot by photographer Mario Sorrenti was released in June, followed by a campaign film directed by Martin Scorsese which premiered in May 2024. He reportedly received $35 million for his involvement in the campaign. Chalamet also worked with Cartier to create a costume necklace and collaborated with Nike on a pair of Dunk Lows; both items were influenced by his character of Willy Wonka. He also began a creative partnership with photographer and filmmaker Aidan Zamiri, who began working with him to craft and document his promotional press tours.

In 2025, Chalamet became Lucid Motors' first-ever global ambassador. He collaborated with luxury streetwear brand Nahmias, to design a hoodie inspired by his role in A Complete Unknown. The brand also launched a more extensive collection with Chalamet to promote Marty Supreme. In December of that year, Chalamet posted a video on social media of him appearing on a remix of EsDeeKid's "4 Raws", adding a verse of his own to the song in which he mentions the film. This came after rumors that Chalamet was the identity behind the masked rapper.

During a CNN/Variety town-hall conversation with Matthew McConaughey in 2026, Chalamet sparked criticism when he said he would not want to work in art forms like ballet or opera. He said he feared cinema similarly becoming as unpopular with the general public, and disliked the idea of theaters relying on private donors instead of being financed by an engaged ticket-paying audience. The comment was not well received by the opera and ballet communities, and by other artists who felt he was dismissing centuries-old art forms; meanwhile, several media outlets defended it as acknowledging the struggle ballet and opera companies face to reach modern audiences.

Later that year, Chalamet announced a partnership with luxury watchmaking brand Urban Jürgensen. He will serve as creative advisor, with a minority stake in the company. In June 2026, Chalamet struck a multi-year deal with prediction market Kalshi, appearing in multiple "slice of life" advertisements for the company.

== Personal life ==
Chalamet splits his time between New York and California. Despite significant media attention and public interest, he rarely discusses the romantic aspects of his personal life. Since April 2023, he has been in a relationship with Kylie Jenner.

Chalamet is an avid sports fan; in his youth, he aspired to be a professional soccer player. He is childhood friends with now-professional soccer player, Alex Muyl. Chalamet is a lifelong supporter of the French soccer team Saint-Étienne. He supports both France and the United States in international soccer. Chalamet is similarly a fan of basketball, having attended numerous New York Knicks games. He has furthermore shown extensive knowledge of college football and professional wrestling.

At age 15, Chalamet operated a YouTube channel called ModdedController360 in which he presented Xbox 360 controllers that he customized. He enjoys hip-hop music and considers rapper Kid Cudi to be his biggest career inspiration, alongside actors Leonardo DiCaprio and Joaquin Phoenix.

== Performances and accolades ==
Chalamet has been nominated for the Academy Award for Best Actor for his performances in Call Me by Your Name, A Complete Unknown and Marty Supreme. He also received five British Academy Film Awards nominations for Call Me by Your Name, Beautiful Boy, A Complete Unknown and Marty Supreme, and won an Actor Award for his role in A Complete Unknown, in addition to nominations for Call Me by Your Name, Beautiful Boy and Marty Supreme. His other accolades include four Golden Globe Award nominations for his roles in Call Me by Your Name, Beautiful Boy, Wonka and A Complete Unknown, and a win for Marty Supreme. He further received a Grammy Award nomination for his work on the soundtrack for A Complete Unknown.
