= The Institute (2017 film) =

- Theatrical release poster
- Directed by: James Franco; Pamela Romanowsky
- Written by: Adam Rager; Matt Rager
- Produced by: James Franco; Luke Daniels; Kurt Fethke; Jeffrey Greenstein; Vince Jolivette; Alan Pao; Scott Reed; Jeff Rice; Jonathan Yunger
- Starring: James Franco; Allie Gallerani; Tim Blake Nelson; Lori Singer; Pamela Anderson; Josh Duhamel; Eric Roberts
- Cinematography: Pedro Gómez Millán
- Edited by: Evan Ahlgren, Aaron I. Butler
- Music by: Adam Crystal
- Production companies: Jeff Rice Films; Redwire Pictures; Campbell Grobman Films; Dark Rabbit Productions
- Distributed by: Momentum Pictures
- Release date: March 3, 2017
- Running time: 90 minutes
- Country: United States
- Language: English

The Institute is a 2017 American horror thriller film co-directed by Pamela Romanowsky and James Franco. It is based on a true story of a young girl's treatment at The Rosewood Institute in Owings Mills, Maryland, and stars Franco, Allie Gallerani, Tim Blake Nelson, and Lori Singer. The film was released on March 3, 2017.

== Synopsis ==
Baltimore, 1893: young Isabel Porter checks herself into the Rosewood Institute, following the sudden death of her parents, and is subjected to extreme experiments in brainwashing and mind control by the insidious Dr. Cairn.

== Cast ==
- James Franco as Dr. Cairn
- Allie Gallerani as Isabel Porter
- Tim Blake Nelson as Dr. Lemelle
- Lori Singer as Madame Werner
- Josh Duhamel as Detective
- Eric Roberts as Dr. Torrington
- Melissa Bolona as Trudy
- Scott Haze as Gunther
- Gabrielle Haugh as Allison

== Reception ==
On review aggregator Rotten Tomatoes the film has a score of 0% based on reviews from 5 critics, with an average rating of 2.50/10 rating.

Both RogerEbert.com and Slant Magazine gave the film one star out of four, with the later writing "The Institute seems constantly on the verge of dipping into spoof, though of what exactly is difficult to say".

Gary Goldstein of the Los Angeles Times dismissed the film as 'silly' and added that "the mishmash of a script by Adam and Matt Rager is filled with arch attempts at period dialogue and much psychobabble. Franco and Romanowsky's unsubtle direction doesn’t help."

Matt Donato of Film Journal International also was not impressed with the film, criticizing the script, direction and approach to the material, saying that "watching The Institute, you'll feel caught in a musty chamber with no escape, slowed by wolfsbane serums that beckon the deepest of sleep. No prescription will cure what ails this botched indie experiment".
