= Happy Baby =

2004 novel by Stephen Elliott

- Author: Stephen Elliott
- Publication date: 2004

Happy Baby is a 2004 novel by Stephen Elliott. The book was a finalist for the New York Public Library Young Lions Fiction Award.

== Plot ==
Theo is addicted to sadomasochism. He insists on being hurt - whether by one he loves or by a professional dominatrix. Theo is a victim of the child welfare system. Told in reverse chronological order, Happy Baby begins when 36-year-old Theo returns to Chicago after six years away, to visit an ex-girlfriend called Maria. He knows Maria from their years growing up together in a state institution, where Theo was sent aged thirteen after his abusive father was killed and his mother died from multiple sclerosis. Theo then drifts into relationships with women who are willing to abuse him.

His need for pain stems from the brutal treatment he received as a child in state custody. He recalls the memory of Mr. Gracie, a pedophile caseworker who regularly raped him when he was aged twelve but also protected him from the other boys. Elliott explores the psychology of child sexual abuse and physical abuse.
