= Calah Lane =

American actress (born 2009)

- Born: Calah Francine Lane; April 20, 2009 (age 17); Irving, Texas, U.S.
- Occupations: Actress; Singer
- Years active: 2013–present
- Known for: Wonka (2023)

Calah Francine Lane (born April 20, 2009) is an American actress and singer. She was born in Irving, Texas and started performing as an actress at the age of 4. She had minor parts in commercials, short movies and episodes of television series, before being cast as the young Laurel in the TV drama This Is Us (2021). Her breakthrough was the role as main character Noodle opposite Timothée Chalamet in Wonka (2023), directed by Paul King. For this, she was nominated for a Critics' Choice Award for Best Young Actor/Actress. and for an NAACP Image Awards for Outstanding Youth Performance in a Motion Picture. In August 2024, Calah Lane released her music single "Otherside" on all major platforms.

== Filmography ==
=== Feature films ===
Year	Title	Role	Notes
2019	The Day Shall Come	Rosa	
2023	Wonka	Noodle	

=== Short films ===
Year	Title	Role	Notes
2016	Please	Young Nadia	
2016	Happy Jack's Treehouse	Lexi	
2017	All That Matters	Cameron	
2017	Bad Things	Sue Ellen	
2018	One in Five	Yana Williams	
2020	Junebug	Young Junie	

=== Television shows ===
Year	Title	Role	Notes
2018	Kidding	Denny's daughter	3 episodes
2021	This Is Us	Young Laurel	1 episode
2021	Family Reunion	Jersey	1 episode
2023	Firebuds	Jazzy (singing voice)	3 episodes
