= The Adderall Diaries (film) =

- Theatrical release poster
- Directed by: Pamela Romanowsky
- Written by: Pamela Romanowsky
- Based on: The Adderall Diaries by Stephen Elliott
- Produced by: Vince Jolivette; James Franco; James Reach; Joseph McKelheer; Marni Zelnick
- Starring: James Franco; Ed Harris; Amber Heard; Jim Parrack; Timothée Chalamet; Cynthia Nixon; Christian Slater
- Cinematography: Bruce Thierry Cheung
- Edited by: Marc Vives
- Music by: Michael Andrews
- Production companies: Rabbit Bandini Productions; Wildwood Enterprises, Inc; Windowseat Entertainment
- Distributed by: A24
- Release dates: April 16, 2015 (Tribeca Film Festival); March 10, 2016 (United States)
- Running time: 105 minutes
- Country: United States
- Language: English
- Box office: $15,364

The Adderall Diaries is a 2015 American crime drama film written and directed by Pamela Romanowsky, based on a "true-crime memoir" book of the same name by Stephen Elliott. The film stars James Franco, Ed Harris, Amber Heard and Christian Slater.

The Adderall Diaries had its world premiere at the Tribeca Film Festival on April 16, 2015. The film was released on DirecTV Cinema on March 10, 2016, prior to opening in a limited release on April 15, 2016, by A24.

== Plot ==
Stephen Elliott is a successful author with a troubled childhood. His mother died when he was a child and his father Neil was physically and psychologically abusive. From his adolescence, Stephen has lived most of his life behaving very destructively, abusing drugs (of which Adderall is an example), and committing petty vandalism.

Now in his 30s, Stephen accepts a deal to write his next book about Hans Reiser, a software guru who developed the ReiserFS filesystem. Hans had a volatile marriage and his wife has recently gone missing. Despite Hans' claims that his wife has simply gone into hiding to hurt him, the police arrested him on suspicion of murder, and he awaits trial. In attendance at the trial is Stephen who hopes to make Hans' memoir a best seller.

Stephen's previous book is an autobiography about his childhood that is about to be released. At a book release party, Stephen reads a part from the book talking about how his estranged father hurt and abused him only for Neil to stand out and brand him a liar. This causes Stephen to question his childhood memories. In despair, Stephen hooks up on recreational drugs, goes to a club, and sleeps with a random person. The next morning, a hungover Stephen checks his voicemails, which include his publisher dropping him for missing an important meeting, and Lana Edmond, a woman he was starting a relationship with, dumping him. To make matters worse, Stephen realizes that he also slept through the jury announcing their verdict on Hans, finding him guilty of murder.

Stephen reconnects with Neil where he finds out about his cancer diagnosis. While talking, Stephen figures out that while Neil made some parenting mistakes, Stephen is falsely remembering his father being downright abusive. A recurring memory of Neil handcuffing him until he bled was because Stephen was trying to commit suicide and Neil was desperately trying to restrain him.

In the end, Stephen writes over the course of two days about making amends with his father. Stephen's agent approves of the newly written manuscript and agrees to publish it. Meanwhile, it is revealed in the news that Hans has finally admitted to killing his wife because she was going to leave him and take his children. He has shown the cops where her body is buried in exchange for a lesser sentence.

== Cast ==
- James Franco as Stephen Elliott
  - Timothée Chalamet as young Stephen Elliott
- Ed Harris as Neil Elliott
- Amber Heard as Lana Edmond
- Jim Parrack as Roger
  - Daniel Flaherty as young Roger
- Christian Slater as Hans Reiser
- Cynthia Nixon as Jen Davis
- Adam LeFevre as Bill DuBois
- Michael Cristofer as Paul Hora
- Wilmer Valderrama as Josh

== Production ==
=== Development ===
Director Pamela Romanowsky met James Franco at New York University while attending the MFA Film Program. After collaborating on a short film, he hired her to direct The Adderall Diaries as he had previously purchased the rights. In June 2014, Christian Slater had been cast in the film.

=== Filming ===
Principal photography began on May 16, 2014 in Brooklyn. On May 23, filming was underway in New York City.

== Release ==
The film had its world premiere at the Tribeca Film Festival on April 16, 2015. Shortly after the premiere, A24 acquired its distribution rights; the film would premiere on DirecTV before a theatrical and video on demand release.

The film was released on March 10, 2016, on DirecTV Cinema prior to a limited theatrical release on April 15, 2016.

== Reception ==
=== Critical response ===
The film received negative reviews from critics. On Rotten Tomatoes, it holds a 25% score based on 36 reviews, with an average rating of 4.5/10. The website's critics consensus reads: "Stylistically overwrought and tedious, The Adderall Diaries aspires for profundity but instead feels like a shambolic class project thrown together right before it was due." Metacritic reports a 42 out of 100 ratings based on 16 critics, indicating "mixed or average reviews".

Stephen Elliott reviewed the film negatively, stating that the final result had little in common with his memoir and wondering "why calling the character Stephen Elliott was necessary."
