= Pamela Romanowsky =

American film director

Pamela Romanowsky is a film director and screenwriter best known for her 2015 film The Adderall Diaries, an adaptation of Stephen Elliot's memoir of the same name.

== Early life ==
Pamela Romanowsky, a native of St. Cloud, Minnesota, attended New York University's MFA Film Program. While there, she collaborated with James Franco and eleven other student filmmakers to co-direct The Color of Time, a film on the life of poet C. K. Williams that starred Franco, Mila Kunis and Jessica Chastain. The film premiered at the 2012 Rome Film Festival.

== Directing career ==
After collaborating with her on The Color of Time, James Franco approached Romanowsky about directing Stephen Elliot's The Adderall Diaries. Rowanowsky workshopped her script at the Sundance Institute, where she was mentored by Walter Salles. The film premiered at the 2015 Tribeca Film Festival. She would collaborate again with Franco on the period-horror film The Institute in 2017.

Rowanowsky has directed four episodes of CW's Riverdale including the season five premiere entitled "Climax". She has also directed two episodes of HBO Max's Gossip Girl.
