= One & Two =

- Theatrical release poster
- Directed by: Andrew Droz Palermo
- Written by: Andrew Droz Palermo; Neima Shahdadi
- Produced by: Matthew Perniciaro; Kim Sherman; Michael Sherman; Patrick M. Wood
- Starring: Kiernan Shipka; Timothée Chalamet; Elizabeth Reaser; Grant Bowler
- Cinematography: Autumn Durald Arkapaw
- Edited by: Alex O'Flinn
- Music by: Nathan Halpern
- Production companies: Bow and Arrow Productions; Son of a Gun Productions
- Distributed by: IFC Midnight
- Release dates: February 9, 2015 (Berlin International Film Festival); August 14, 2015 (United States)
- Running time: 90 minutes
- Country: United States
- Language: English

One & Two is a 2015 American independent Southern Gothic coming-of-age fantasy thriller film written and directed by Andrew Droz Palermo. The film stars Kiernan Shipka, Timothée Chalamet, Elizabeth Reaser, and Grant Bowler. The film had its world premiere on February 9, 2015, at the Berlin International Film Festival. The film was released on August 14, 2015, in a limited release and through video on demand by IFC Midnight.

== Plot ==
A Christian family of four live peacefully in purposeful isolation. The children, Eva and Zac, are able to teleport short distances, provided they can see where they are going. They use their powers for fun as they chase each other around the farm and drop into the lake. A large wall surrounds the family property. Their father, Daniel, is a stern disciplinarian who forbids them from using their powers as he believes them unnatural. His wife Elizabeth is extremely frail, suffering from seizures where she cannot breathe, and he believes her illness is punishment from God due to his children using their powers.

When Eva and Zac sneak out after dark to play and Elizabeth has a near-fatal seizure, Daniel punishes them by making them face their bedroom walls and nailing their clothes to the wall, preventing them from teleporting away. Despite this, Eva continues using her powers, while Zac refuses to join her. When she tries to teleport an injured bird back to its nest, the bird dies, revealing that teleporting with anyone would end fatally for that individual.

Eva continues to sneak out. When Elizabeth dies, Daniel blames Eva. He knocks her out, puts a bag over her head and sets her adrift down the river in a boat. He buries one of Eva's dresses in a grave beside her mother's on the family plot. He tells Zac that she is taken care of, heavily implying that he has killed her. Zac is furious and visits her makeshift grave to mourn. Eva drifts to a nearby town, where she is found and taken to hospital. Eva struggles in the modern setting. She escapes the hospital, ending up under a bridge by a river, where she meets three kind elderly homeless people. They feed her crackers and play the guitar by the fire until the police arrive, causing Eva to become afraid and teleport away. Eventually she meets a girl her age on the street, whom she follows to a youth home for girls. Soon, she runs away again and decides to return home to Zac. It is implied that she has a connection to Zac, as she is able to locate their home through teleporting short distances along the way.

Meanwhile, Zac is struggling living with Daniel. After a vicious argument, Zac grabs Daniel and teleports, unaware of the consequences. To his horror, Daniel dies shortly afterwards. The next morning, Eva arrives at the wall, teleporting into the air and then onto the ground before she hits it. Zac finishes burying his father and sees her in the woods. They run and embrace each other. As they mourn their parents, they burn their childhood home down as an act of renewal.

== Cast ==
- Kiernan Shipka as Eva: Daniel and Elizabeth's younger daughter, and Zac's sister, who has the ability to teleport
- Timothée Chalamet as Zac: Daniel and Elizabeth's elder son, and Eva's brother, who also has the ability to teleport
- Elizabeth Reaser as Elizabeth: Eva and Zac's mother and Daniel's wife, who has seizures
- Grant Bowler as Daniel: Elizabeth's husband, and the abusive and destructive father of Zac and Eva

== Production ==
Production on the film began on July 21, 2014, in North Carolina, and concluded on August 17, 2014. After production on the film was complete, it was announced Kiernan Shipka, Timothée Chalamet, and Elizabeth Reaser, and Grant Bowler, had all been cast in the film.

== Release ==
The film had its world premiere at the Berlin International Film Festival on February 9, 2015. The film went on to premiere at SXSW on March 14, 2015. Shortly after it was announced IFC Midnight had acquired distribution rights to the film. The film then went on to premiere at the Edinburgh International Film Festival on June 22, 2015. and the Berlin Fantasy Film Festival on August 13, 2015. The film was then released on August 14, 2015, in a limited release and through video on demand.

== Reception ==
Writing in DVD Talk, critic Jeff Nelson described the screenplay as "so incredibly vague, that you're guaranteed to leave with a long list of unanswered questions," that "we're left with a story that feels like it's missing more than a few pieces of the puzzle," and that although "the characters are complex and well-crafted [...] it's the gaping holes left in character disposition that truly hinder the film."

One & Two received mixed to negative reviews from critics. On review aggregator website Rotten Tomatoes, the film holds a 47% approval rating based on 17 reviews, with an average rating of 5.4/10. Metacritic, which uses a weighted average, assigned the film a score of 47 out of 100, based on eight critics, indicating "mixed or average" reviews.
