= Wonka (film) =

2023 film by Paul King

- Theatrical release poster
- Directed by: Paul King
- Screenplay by: Simon Farnaby; Paul King
- Story by: Paul King
- Based on: Charlie and the Chocolate Factory by Roald Dahl
- Produced by: David Heyman; Alexandra Derbyshire; Luke Kelly
- Starring: Timothée Chalamet; Calah Lane; Keegan-Michael Key; Paterson Joseph; Matt Lucas; Mathew Baynton; Sally Hawkins; Rowan Atkinson; Jim Carter; Olivia Colman; Hugh Grant
- Cinematography: Chung Chung-hoon
- Edited by: Mark Everson
- Music by: Joby Talbot
- Production companies: Village Roadshow Pictures; The Roald Dahl Story Company; Heyday Films
- Distributed by: Warner Bros. Pictures
- Release dates: October 24, 2023 (ShowEast); December 8, 2023 (United Kingdom); December 15, 2023 (United States)
- Running time: 116 minutes
- Countries: United Kingdom; United States
- Language: English
- Budget: $125 million
- Box office: $634.5 million

Wonka is a 2023 musical fantasy film directed by Paul King, who co-wrote the screenplay with Simon Farnaby. It is a prequel to the events that occur in Charlie and the Chocolate Factory by Roald Dahl. The film stars Timothée Chalamet as Willy Wonka and also features Calah Lane, Keegan-Michael Key, Paterson Joseph, Matt Lucas, Mathew Baynton, Sally Hawkins, Rowan Atkinson, Jim Carter, Olivia Colman, and Hugh Grant. It portrays Willy Wonka's early days as a chocolatier while contending with his future rivals.

Development began when Warner Bros. Pictures reacquired the film rights to the character in October 2016 and announced that the film would be an origin story. The film tells an original story and was developed by King to exist as a "companion piece" to the film Willy Wonka & the Chocolate Factory by reprising some of the music, thematic elements, and the visual design of the Oompa Loompas. In May 2021, Chalamet was confirmed to portray Wonka, and the supporting cast was announced in September of that year. Filming began in the United Kingdom in September, at Warner Bros. Studios Leavesden in Watford, as well as Oxford, Lyme Regis, Bath, St Albans, and at the Rivoli Ballroom in Crofton Park, London. The film's original songs were written by Neil Hannon and its original score was composed by Joby Talbot.

Wonka premiered in London at the Royal Festival Hall, Southbank Centre on November 28, 2023, and was released by Warner Bros. Pictures in the United Kingdom on December 8, and in the United States on December 15. The film received generally positive reviews from critics, who praised Chalamet's performance and the film's presentation, and was a box-office success, grossing over $634 million worldwide against a $125 million budget, to become the eighth-highest-grossing film of 2023. It received a nomination for the BAFTA Award for Outstanding British Film and Chalamet was nominated for a Golden Globe Award for Best Actor in a Motion Picture – Musical or Comedy. A sequel is in development.

== Plot ==
Willy Wonka, a young chocolatier, arrives at the Galéries Gourmet with dreams of establishing his own chocolate shop. Wonka is coerced to stay at Mrs. Scrubitt's boarding house by her co-worker, Bleacher, and unknowingly signs a predatory contract due to his illiteracy. The next day, he introduces "hoverchocs", which make the consumer fly, but rival chocolatiers Arthur Slugworth, Gerald Prodnose, and Felix Fickelgruber have Wonka's earnings confiscated by Officer Affable for selling without a shop. Unable to pay the contract's exorbitant fees, Wonka is forced to work in Scrubbitt's launderette alongside her foster daughter, Noodle, and fellow captives Abacus Crunch, Piper Benz, Larry Chucklesworth, and Lottie Bell.

Wonka befriends Noodle, who agrees to teach him how to read. Meanwhile, the "Chocolate Cartel" bribe the Chief of Police to torment Wonka. Crunch, having previously worked for Slugworth as an accountant, reveals that the Cartel has a secret vault of chocolate, used for bribes to maintain their power. Wonka and the launderette workers embark on a chocolate-selling crusade to alleviate their debts, using the city's storm drains to evade the police. Wonka discovers his chocolates are being pilfered by an Oompa Loompa named Lofty, who seeks retribution for the cocoa beans Wonka took from Loompaland under his watch.

Wonka finally opens his dream chocolate shop, but the Cartel enlist Scrubitt to sabotage his chocolates with Yeti sweat and different unnamed "poisons". As a result, Wonka's customers become disfigured from the sabotaged chocolates and are outraged. Chaos ensues, leading to the destruction of the shop. Wonka reluctantly accepts the Cartel's offer to pay off everyone's debts in exchange for him leaving town by boat. The laundry workers are released, but Slugworth pays Scrubitt to keep Noodle indefinitely. Wonka deduces that Noodle and Slugworth are related, before he, with Lofty aboard, realizes the Cartel has rigged the boat to explode. After escaping from the boat and rescuing Noodle, Wonka and his friends devise a strategy to obtain the Cartel's incriminating account book.

Wonka and Noodle infiltrate the Cartel's headquarters, only to be confronted by the Cartel. Slugworth reveals that following the death of Noodle's father, his own brother Zebedee, he lied to her mother Dorothy Smith that Noodle had died as well and gave the newborn to Scrubitt. Held at gunpoint and locked in the Cartel's vault of liquid chocolate, Wonka and Noodle nearly drown, but Lofty, still seeking reimbursement from Wonka, rescues them.

Wonka and Noodle expose the Cartel's misdeeds, releasing their chocolate reserves into the city fountain, now laced with Wonka's unique ingredients, ruining the Cartel's enterprise. The Cartel float away, having eaten Wonka's hoverchocs, and the Chief is arrested by Affable. Wonka reunites Noodle with her mother and purchases an abandoned castle that he transforms into his own chocolate factory, with Lofty heading the tasting department.

During the credits, Lofty shows footage of Wonka's friends returning to their old lives, while Affable leads the arrests of Scrubitt and Bleacher.

== Cast ==
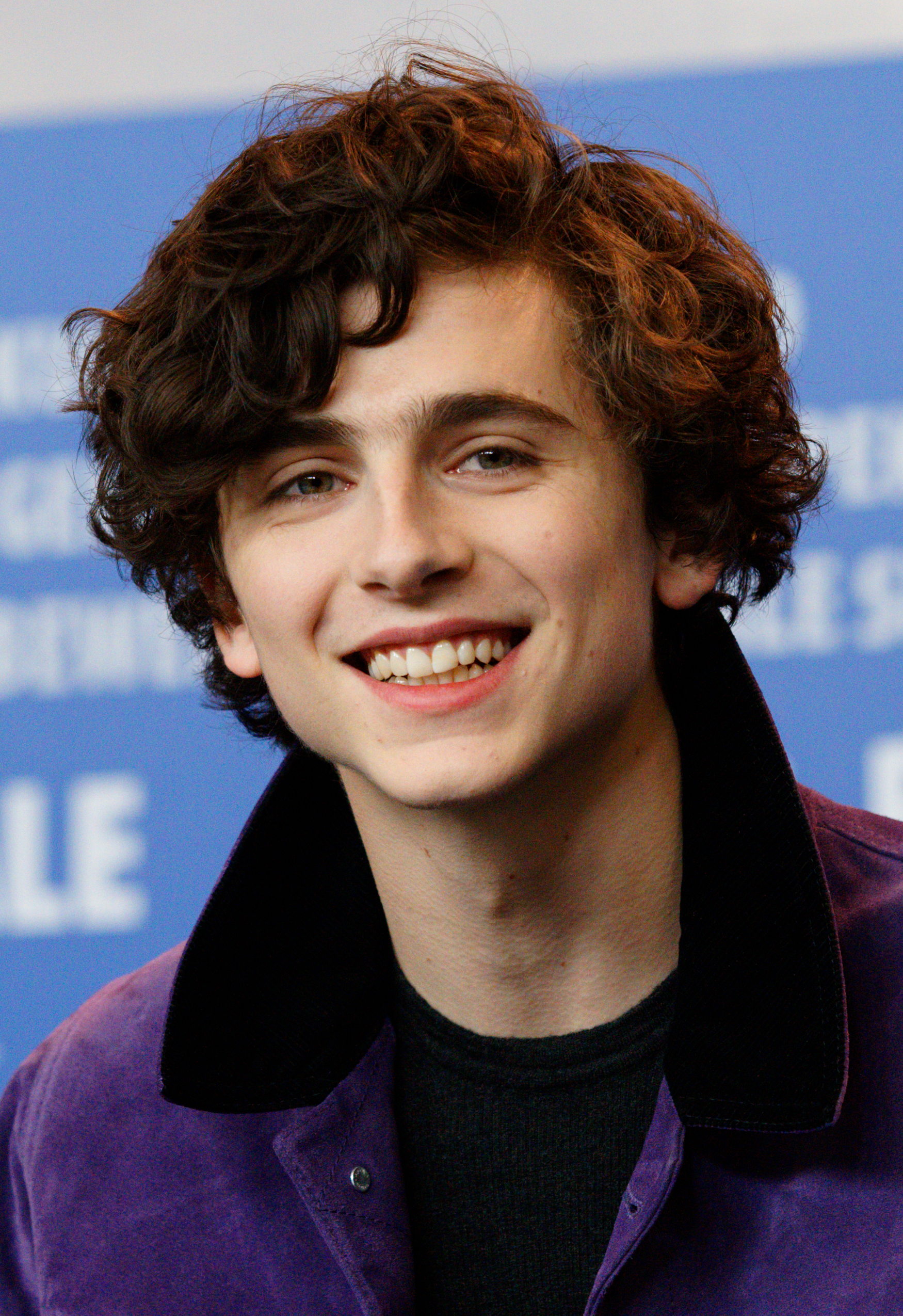
Timothée Chalamet portrayed the title character in the film

- Timothée Chalamet as Willy Wonka, an aspiring magician, inventor, and chocolatier with a difficult dream to open his very own chocolate shop
  - Colin O'Brien as young Willy
- Calah Lane as Noodle, a 14-year-old orphan who becomes Wonka's assistant
- Keegan-Michael Key as the sweet-toothed Chief-of-Police in league with the Chocolate Cartel, who grows fatter as the film progresses until becoming morbidly obese after consuming massive quantities of chocolate. Key wore a fatsuit during parts of the film.
- Paterson Joseph as Arthur Slugworth, a businessman and the Commander-in-chief of the Chocolate Cartel
- Matt Lucas as Gerald Prodnose, a wig-wearing businessman and member of the Chocolate Cartel
- Mathew Baynton as Felix Fickelgruber, a businessman and member of the Chocolate Cartel
- Sally Hawkins as Mrs. Wonka, Willy Wonka's late mother
- Rowan Atkinson as Father Julius, a sweet-toothed cleric and leader of a group of chocoholic monks who is in league with The Chocolate Cartel
- Jim Carter as Abacus Crunch, an accountant and hotel co-worker of Wonka who reveals to Wonka the existence of the Chocolate Cartel after previously working as an accountant for Slugworth
- Natasha Rothwell as Piper Benz, a plumber and co-worker of Wonka
- Olivia Colman as Mrs. Scrubitt, a greedy laundrette and hotel owner who enslaves her workers
- Hugh Grant as the motion capture of Lofty, an Oompa-Loompa who eventually becomes Wonka's ally
- Rich Fulcher as Larry Chucklesworth, a comedian and co-worker of Wonka.
- Rakhee Thakrar as Lottie Bell, a switchboard operator and co-worker of Wonka who had nothing to contribute to her co-workers' discussions
- Tom Davis as Bleacher, Mrs. Scrubbit's business partner
- Kobna Holdbrook-Smith as Officer Affable, a police officer working under the Chief of Police.
- Simon Farnaby as Basil, a zoo security guard
- Phil Wang and Charlotte Ritchie as Colin and Barbara, two people who got married thanks to Wonka's chocolates
- Ellie White as Gwennie, a cleric warrior and "Keeper of the Keys" that guards the underground entrance to the cartel's lair
- Freya Parker as Miss Bon Bon, Slugworth's secretary
- Sophie Winkleman as the countess
- Murray McArthur as a ship captain
- Isy Suttie as a produce vendor
- Ben Howard and Muzz Khan as two Oompa-Loompa guards in a flashback that caught Lofty sleeping on the job
- Tim FitzHigham as a ship captain that rigged Wonka's boat with dynamite on the Chief of Police's orders
- Jane Bertish as Baroness Von Schmeichelhammer, a baroness whose funeral observance of her late husband ends up delayed by Abigail the Giraffe
- Dominic Coleman as Donovan, a chauffeur working for Slugworth
- Tracy Ifeachor as Dorothy Smith, a librarian and Noodle's long-lost mother

== Production ==
=== Development ===
In October 2016, Warner Bros. Pictures reacquired the rights to the Charlie and the Chocolate Factory (1964) character Willy Wonka from Roald Dahl's estate, with a film in development from producers David Heyman and Michael Siegel. The announcement of the project was met with a mostly negative response as it came less than two months following the death of Gene Wilder, who portrayed Willy Wonka in the 1971 film adaptation. The following month, Heyman revealed that the project would not be a third straight adaptation of the book: "They've done two films, quite different. But it's possibly an origin story. We're just in the early stages of it, working with a writer called Simon Rich, which is wonderful." In February 2018, it was announced Paul King was in negotiations to direct. He ultimately decided against completing his Paddington films, as he had been satisfied with his first two films and felt "it was time to let go and give somebody else a shot". That year, it was revealed that the film would be a prequel to the events of Dahl's book. King grew up as a fan of both the book and the 1971 film adaptation and enjoyed Tim Burton's 2005 adaptation as an adult. "I was a bit nervous because origin stories don't always feel essential, and I was aware this is such a beloved property," he said. King's hiring as director, as well as the project's title, Wonka, was announced in January 2021. The film had financing through Domain Entertainment.

=== Writing ===
After being approached by Heyman to direct, King felt the urge to revisit Dahl's book and was surprised: "I realised that it's also an amazing emotional masterpiece. I really wasn't expecting that. Or maybe I had forgotten how incredibly touching it is. Poor little Charlie suffers so much. And you're so rooting for him. I found myself in tears at the end of it." While looking through Dahl's archives and unpublished material for research, King found that Dahl had expressed interest in exploring Wonka's backstory but never went far with it. When writing the screenplay, King did not want to "reinvent" the 1971 film, instead he wanted it to be a "companion piece" to both the book and the original film adaptation; as such, he decided to set it 25 years before the events of the story. He set the story during the 1940s and paid homage to classic European story books. He worked closely with the Dahl estate, particularly producer Luke Kelly, who is Dahl's grandson. Creating the supporting characters, King was inspired by several of Dahl's other stories: the trio of villains, the "Chocolate Cartel", drew inspiration from Boggis, Bunce, and Bean from Dahl's Fantastic Mr Fox; and the character of Mrs. Scrubitt was inspired by Dahl's short story "The Landlady". He also stated Slugworth's chocolate cartel as being a "savage indictment of capitalism", wanting each character to represent a different aspect of greed, whereas Wonka had epitomized generosity and dedicated his life in creating his factory. King developed the screenplay with his Paddington 2 (2017) collaborator Simon Farnaby, with additional material from Jeff Nathanson, Simon Rich, and Simon Stephenson. He did not consider the film a musical, but "a movie with songs", noting that the Oompa Loompas sang in the book and Dahl's usage of poetry. He cited Oliver! (1968), Cabaret (1972), Bugsy Malone (1976), and Annie (1982) as inspirations, particularly focusing on Oliver! as he felt Dahl's book was influenced by Charles Dickens.

=== Casting ===
Timothée Chalamet and Tom Holland were the frontrunners for the title role after King joined the project. Donald Glover, Ryan Gosling, and Ezra Miller were previously considered for the role. According to Paul King, "We were pretty open to looking for the right person. But, for me, it really was a list of one." King was impressed with Chalamet's performances in Call Me by Your Name (2017) and Lady Bird (2017). King offered the actor the part with no audition after seeing his high school performances on YouTube, which proved his vocal and dancing skills. Christopher Gattelli choreographed the film's musical numbers and worked with Chalamet on its dance sequences. Chalamet grew up as a fan of both the 1971 and 2005 films and wanted to portray the character in a different way from Wilder and Johnny Depp: "It was a total inverse of that Willy Wonka with a demented look in his eye that we all know. How would that character have started, to land in a place where he's still childlike but sort of broken?" King likened Chalamet's Wonka to "a Charlie Chaplin innocent character, almost like the immigrant tramp figure coming to this world for the first time, bright-eyed and bushy-tailed and completely naive – with this childlike wonder but none of the street smarts that he's going to develop over the next 25 years." Chalamet was officially cast in May 2021 and was paid $9 million for his involvement.

In September 2021, it was announced Keegan-Michael Key, Sally Hawkins, Rowan Atkinson, Olivia Colman, and Jim Carter were among the newest additions to the cast, with Farnaby also set for a role. Unlike the 1971 and 2005 films, Wonka is the first film to not feature the Oompa-Loompas portrayed by dwarf actors. The casting of Hugh Grant as Lofty generated backlash from the dwarfism community.

=== Filming ===
Principal photography began in the United Kingdom in September 2021, with Seamus McGarvey as cinematographer, Nathan Crowley as production designer, Mark Everson as film editor, and Lindy Hemming as costume designer. Filming took place at historic Lyme Regis and Bath, at Warner Bros. Studios Leavesden in Watford, and the Rivoli Ballroom in Brockley, London. By December, McGarvey exited as cinematographer with Chung Chung-hoon replacing him. Additional scenes were shot in Oxford in December and February.

=== Post-production ===
Graham Page served as the visual effects supervisor, while Dominic Sidoli served as the visual effects producer. Visual effects vendors included Framestore, Outpost VFX, Goldcrest VFX, and Host VFX, providing over 1,163 shots.

== Music ==
Neil Hannon, of the Divine Comedy, wrote the film's original songs, and the score was composed by Joby Talbot. The soundtrack with the original songs and score was released by WaterTower Music on December 8, 2023.

== Release ==
Wonka had special screenings at ShowEast on October 24, 2023, and at the auditorium at Naval Support Activity Hampton Roads on November 19. The next day, the film had a special premiere in Tokyo, with a red carpet attended by director Paul King, producers David Heyman and Alexandra Derbyshire, and stars Timothée Chalamet and Hugh Grant. The film had its world premiere in London, at the Royal Festival Hall, Southbank Centre, on November 28, and was theatrically released by Warner Bros. Pictures in the United Kingdom ten days later, followed by the United States, on December 15, 2023, in both conventional theaters and in Dolby Cinema and IMAX. It was originally set for release on March 17, 2023.

=== Marketing ===
The marketing campaign from Warner Bros. Pictures for Wonka began on October 10, 2021, when Chalamet shared a photograph of himself in costume as Willy Wonka. The image was posted on Chalamet's Instagram with the caption "The suspense is terrible, I hope it will last," a reference to a famous Wilder line in the 1971 film, which itself is a quote from the 1895 play The Importance of Being Earnest by Oscar Wilde. The Guardian noted that the image was met with mixed reception online.

On April 26, 2022, footage of Chalamet as Willy Wonka was shared during Warner Bros. Pictures' presentation at CinemaCon. It also featured a rendition of the song "Pure Imagination" from the 1971 film. Deadline described the trailer: "Think Fantastic Beasts in regards to period (early 20th century), but so much more fun". The following year at the convention, Warner Bros. screened a teaser trailer for Wonka, which also saw a first-look at Grant as an Oompa-Loompa, which caused criticism from actors with dwarfism, including Jason Acuña, who remarked, "So I guess Hugh Grant, you're now identifying as a little person". IndieWire praised Chalamet's transformation as Wonka remarking: "like the chocolate he concocts in this first trailer, it will make you fly". The trailer was released to the public on July 11, 2023, alongside a teaser poster. The film was also promoted during the 97th Macy's Thanksgiving Day Parade on November 23 in the form of a float called "The Deliciously Delectable World of Wonka." On November 27, 2023, IHOP introduced a Wonka Menu to promote the film.

=== Home media ===
Wonka was released for digital platforms on January 22, 2024, in the UK. It was released by Warner Bros. Home Entertainment on digital download on January 30, and on Ultra HD Blu-ray, Blu-ray, and DVD on February 27 in the US. It is available for streaming exclusively on HBO Max as of March 8. It became the number one best-selling film in 2024, across all home entertainment formats in the United Kingdom, with 821,000 units sold.

== Reception ==
=== Box office ===
Wonka grossed $218.4 million in the United States and Canada, and $416.1 million in other territories, for a worldwide total of $634.5 million. Deadline Hollywood calculated the film's net profit as $182 million, accounting for production budgets, marketing, talent participations, and other costs; box office grosses and home media revenues placed it sixth on their list of 2023's "Most Valuable Blockbusters".

One week before its US theatrical release, Wonka grossed $43.2 million from 37 countries. The biggest totals were from the United Kingdom and Republic of Ireland ($11.1 million), Mexico ($5.2 million), Spain ($4.4 million), Germany ($3.6 million), Italy ($3.4 million), China ($3.3 million), Japan ($3.1 million), and Brazil ($2 million).

In the United States and Canada, Wonka was projected to gross around $40 million from 4,150 theaters in its opening weekend. The film made $14.4 million on its first day, including $3.5 million from Thursday night previews. It went on to debut with $39 million, becoming the first live-action musical to top the box office in the post-COVID pandemic era. In its second weekend, the film made $18.8 million in its traditional three-day frame, and $10.3 million on Christmas Day, for a total of $28.4 million over the four-day frame, finishing second behind newcomer Aquaman and the Lost Kingdom. The film returned to the top of the box office in its third weekend, grossing $24 million with a 33% increase from the previous weekend. Wonka retained the top spot at the box office in its fourth weekend, grossing $14.1 million with a decrease of 36% from its third weekend.

=== Critical response ===
On the review aggregator website Rotten Tomatoes, 82% of 332 critics' reviews are positive, with an average rating of 7.2/10. The website's consensus reads: "With director Paul King at the helm and some solid new songs at the ready, the warmly old-fashioned Wonka puts a suitably sweet spin on the classic character while still leaving some room for the source material's darker undertones." Metacritic, which uses a weighted average, assigned the film a score of 66 out of 100, based on 64 critics, indicating "generally favorable" reviews. Audiences polled by CinemaScore gave the film an average grade of "A–" on an A+ to F scale, while those polled by PostTrak gave it an 85% overall positive score, with 64% saying they would definitely recommend the film.

Rotten Tomatoes found the initial reactions on social media to be mostly positive, with some reviewers criticizing the script and others praising Chalamet's performance, the musical performances and the film's presentation. According to the website, critics found the film to be "silly and fun for the whole family with catchy music and stunning production design, even if it loses some of the edge found in its predecessors." The BBC reported that a number of critics likened the film tonally to the Paddington films, and despite "several glowing reviews", some felt that Wonka "lacks the darker elements of previous versions". Chalamet's performance was both praised and criticized for his singing, while some considered him miscast.

In a 5 out of 5 star review, Peter Bradshaw of The Guardian wrote that the film is "spectacular, imaginative, sweet-natured and funny". Although Bradshaw appreciated Chalamet's performance, finding it better than previous adaptations of the character, the film does not explain "what happened to him as a young man to turn him into the somewhat ambiguous, even sinister adult figure with a streak of Dahlian cruelty", wondering if in a possible sequel "something happens to sour our young hero".

Owen Gleiberman of Variety wrote that "Wonka may be the squarest big-scale Hollywood musical in decades" as a "fun, rousing, impeccably staged, jaw-droppingly old-fashioned musical prequel to the legendary Roald Dahl tale", but "it might have been an even bigger hit had it been a little less sanded off for children". Stephanie Zacharek of Time wrote that "Wonka is carefully calibrated to bring joy" which is "plenty of feel-goodism for one musical", with "grand but somehow flat-looking sets" and "with musical numbers that stress the importance of dreams and wonder and friendship", but which "gives us everything but that quiet, thrumming sensation".

In a more negative review, David Rooney of The Hollywood Reporter found the film "sickly sweet and hopelessly twee" with the character of Willy Wonka "neutered, stripped of any edge that might have made him interesting" and that "a number of gifted actors are either misused or wasted". Johnny Oleksinski of New York Post also pointed out that "it's a shame that in this origin story the viewer doesn't leave with any deepened understanding of who Willy Wonka is" and "absent of any edge or layered characters", stressing that "Wonka is at its most enjoyable when you forget the novel".

=== Accolades ===
Award	Date of ceremony	Category	Nominee(s)	Result	Ref.
Astra Film and Creative Awards	February 26, 2024	Best Publicity Campaign	Wonka	Nominated	
BAFTA Film Awards	February 18, 2024	Outstanding British Film	Paul King, David Heyman, Simon Farnaby and Alexandra Derbyshire	Nominated	
Critics' Choice Movie Awards	January 14, 2024	Best Young Actor/Actress	Calah Lane	Nominated	
Critics' Choice Movie Awards	January 14, 2024	Best Costume Design	Lindy Hemming	Nominated	
Golden Globe Awards	January 7, 2024	Best Actor – Motion Picture Musical or Comedy	Timothée Chalamet	Nominated	
Hollywood Music in Media Awards	November 15, 2023	Original Song — Sci-Fi/Fantasy Film	Neil Hannon, Simon Farnaby and Paul King ("A World of Your Own")	Nominated	
Hollywood Music in Media Awards	November 15, 2023	Original Song — Sci-Fi/Fantasy Film	Neil Hannon, Simon Farnaby and Paul King ("You've Never Had Chocolate Like This")	Nominated	
Hollywood Music in Media Awards	November 15, 2023	Best Song – Onscreen Performance (Film)	Timothée Chalamet ("A World of Your Own")	Nominated	
Hollywood Music in Media Awards	November 15, 2023	Music Themed Film, Biopic, or Musical	Wonka	Nominated	
Nickelodeon Kids' Choice Awards	July 13, 2024	Favorite Movie	Wonka	Nominated	
Nickelodeon Kids' Choice Awards	July 13, 2024	Favorite Movie Actor	Timothée Chalamet	Won	
Nickelodeon Kids' Choice Awards	July 13, 2024	Favorite Villain	Keegan-Michael Key	Nominated	
Saturn Awards	2 February 2025	Best Fantasy Film	Wonka	Nominated	
Saturn Awards	2 February 2025	Best Younger Actor in a Film	Calah Lane	Nominated	
Saturn Awards	2 February 2025	Best Costume	Lindy Hemming	Nominated	
People's Choice Awards	February 18, 2024	The Comedy Movie of the Year	Wonka	Nominated	
People's Choice Awards	February 18, 2024	The Male Movie Star of the Year	Timothée Chalamet	Nominated	
People's Choice Awards	February 18, 2024	The Comedy Movie Star of the Year	Timothée Chalamet	Nominated	
Visual Effects Society Awards	February 21, 2024	Outstanding Animated Character in a Photoreal Feature	Dale Newton, Kunal Ayer, Valentina Ercolani and Gabor Foner (for Oompa Loompa)	Nominated	

== Future ==
In a September 2023 interview with Total Film, King expressed interest in making sequels, saying: "Dahl was definitely interested in taking Willy Wonka on. There's drafts that didn't really go anywhere, and there's a short story. He didn't really write sequels, but this was the one book where he clearly felt there was more in the tank there. There's an awful lot more Wonka story that we have that we would like to tell. It's not like Dune: Part One where you go, 'This is what's happening in Part Two.' Hopefully it works exquisitely as a stand-alone movie. But I would definitely like to do more. And I'd like to spend more time in this world, and meet some more Oompa Loompas."

In November 2024, while attending the Paddington in Peru red carpet, Paul King confirmed that development on a sequel was underway, stating "We're very early. We've got about half of a draft [...] We've got a story that we like and we know where we want to take him."

In August 2026, it was reported that the sequel had been indefinitely delayed due to Chalamet's schedule; however, a Warner Bros. spokesperson later denied the delay, stating, "Reports suggesting a Wonka 2 delay are entirely false. The Wonka creative team is hard at work on the next chapter." Additionally, co-writer Simon Farnaby said his comments had been taken out of context and he had not meant to suggest the film had been delayed or canceled.
