= A Complete Unknown (soundtrack) =

A Complete Unknown (Original Motion Picture Soundtrack)

Soundtrack album by Timothée Chalamet
- Released: December 20, 2024
- Length: 58:44
- Label: Columbia
- Producers: Nick Baxter; James Mangold

Singles from A Complete Unknown (Original Motion Picture Soundtrack)
- 1. "Girl from the North Country" / "Like a Rolling Stone" Released: December 6, 2024

A Complete Unknown (Original Motion Picture Soundtrack) is the soundtrack album to the Bob Dylan biopic of the same name. The album consists primarily of songs written by Dylan himself and performed by Timothée Chalamet, who portrays Dylan in the film. Supporting cast members Monica Barbaro, Edward Norton, and Boyd Holbrook also perform additional songs as Joan Baez, Pete Seeger, and Johnny Cash, respectively. The album was produced by the film's director James Mangold alongside Nick Baxter, with additional production from Steven Gizicki.

Ahead of the album's release, "Like a Rolling Stone" (performed by Chalamet) and "Girl from the North Country" (performed by Chalamet and Barbaro) were released on December 6, 2024. The album was released digitally by Columbia Records on December 20, 2024. The album received a 16-track vinyl release in January 2025, followed by a CD release in February.

The album was nominated for the Grammy Award for Best Compilation Soundtrack for Visual Media at the 68th Annual Grammy Awards.

== Background ==
As the film documents Dylan's life, particularly revolving around the controversy on his shift to electric instruments, Mangold revealed that he had selected one-tenth of Dylan songs that had been recorded during this period for inclusion in the film. Producer Fred Berger accounted its number to 40, while the soundtrack album has 23 songs. The film's executive music producer Nicholai Baxter listened to most of Dylan's recordings with Chalamet and tried to select the appropriate sounds, while Dylan's manager Jeff Rosen provided an entire library of unreleased Dylan recordings. Chalamet is reported to have listened to 16 hours of Dylan's recordings in one day. Baxter found alternative versions of Dylan songs—"Blowin' in the Wind", "Girl from the North Country" and "The Times They Are a-Changin'"—from his first recordings in 1963. Most of the film's soundscape consists of acoustic folk sounds before its shift to electronic music in the final act.

Chalamet performed all the songs as heard in the film, as did the other principal cast members. Chalamet prepared himself by singing and playing guitars and harmonica when the film's production was delayed due to the COVID-19 pandemic and the 2023 Hollywood labor disputes. Initially, he had pre-recorded his vocals to play the role. However, he convinced Mangold and the rest of the production team to perform the songs live. Though initially hesitant, Mangold and the team were impressed with Chalamet's live performances, and relegating the pre-recorded vocals to use for the film's soundtrack.

The sound team—sound mixing engineer Tod A. Maitland, supervising music editor Ted Caplan, re-recording mixer Paul Massey, and supervising sound editor Donald Sylvester—used around 40 microphones which were period-appropriate, to which Maitland added: "the idea was to get a little bit different sound in each different venue by using practical microphones from the period. That helped create a nice tapestry of sounds. But [Chalamet] went 100% live. It was pretty amazing." Maitland and the recording team refrained the use of earpieces throughout the sessions. Caplan claimed that despite no full song performances, each song had been recorded as like a concert, which gave it as "a special live real magic".

== Release ==
On December 6, 2024, Chalamet's performance of "Like a Rolling Stone" and "Girl from the North Country" were released as singles from the album. The soundtrack was released through Columbia Records on December 20, five days prior to the film's release, with a 16-track vinyl LP which was released on January 24, 2025, and a 23-track CD set for February 28.

== Track listing ==
No.	Title	Performer(s)	Length
1.	"Highway 61 Revisited"	Timothée Chalamet	3:45
2.	"Mr. Tambourine Man"	Timothée Chalamet	2:31
3.	"I Was Young When I Left Home"	Timothée Chalamet	2:04
4.	"Girl from the North Country"	Timothée Chalamet; Monica Barbaro	2:04
5.	"Silver Dagger"	Monica Barbaro	2:33
6.	"A Hard Rain's a-Gonna Fall"	Timothée Chalamet	3:05
7.	"Wimoweh (Mbube)"	Edward Norton	1:51
8.	"House of the Rising Sun"	Monica Barbaro	2:08
9.	"Folsom Prison Blues"	Boyd Holbrook	1:44
10.	"Don't Think Twice, It's All Right"	Timothée Chalamet; Monica Barbaro	3:08
11.	"Masters of War"	Timothée Chalamet	2:25
12.	"Blowin' in the Wind"	Timothée Chalamet; Monica Barbaro	2:52
13.	"Subterranean Homesick Blues"	Timothée Chalamet	2:27
14.	"Big River"	Boyd Holbrook	1:41
15.	"The Times They Are a-Changin'"	Timothée Chalamet	3:14
16.	"When the Ship Comes In"	Timothée Chalamet; Edward Norton	2:19
17.	"There but for Fortune"	Monica Barbaro	1:43
18.	"It Ain't Me, Babe"	Timothée Chalamet; Monica Barbaro	3:37
19.	"Maggie's Farm"	Timothée Chalamet	3:08
20.	"It Takes a Lot to Laugh, It Takes a Train to Cry"	Timothée Chalamet	2:21
21.	"Like a Rolling Stone"	Timothée Chalamet	3:23
22.	"It's All Over Now, Baby Blue"	Timothée Chalamet	2:21
23.	"Song to Woody"	Timothée Chalamet	2:20
Total length:			58:44

== Personnel ==
=== Musicians ===
- Ross Garren – harmonica (tracks 1–4, 10, 13, 15, 21, 22)
- Nick Baxter – whistles (track 1), guitar (3, 4, 6, 12, 15)
- Sean Hurley – bass guitar (tracks 1, 13, 14, 19–21)
- Andrew Synowiec – guitar (tracks 1, 13, 14, 19–21)
- Brandon Walters – guitar (tracks 1, 13, 14, 19–21)
- Jacob Reed – drums (tracks 1, 13, 14), percussion (13)
- Jeff Babko – keyboards (tracks 1, 13), organ (19–21)
- Tim Carmon – piano (tracks 1, 19–21)
- George Doering – guitar (tracks 2, 4, 10, 20–22)
- Rob Paparozzi – harmonica (tracks 3, 21)
- Matt Menefee – banjo (track 7)
- Adam Tressler – guitar (track 8)
- Victor Indrizzo – drums (tracks 19–21), percussion (20, 21)
- Mike Valerio – bass guitar (tracks 19–21)
- Dan Kalisher – guitar (tracks 16, 23)

=== Technical ===
- James Mangold – production
- Nick Baxter – production, mixing, engineering
- Steven Gizicki – additional production
- Dale Becker – mastering
- Chandler Harrod – engineering (tracks 1, 13, 14, 19–21)
- Phil Levine – Dolby Atmos mix engineering

== Charts ==
Chart performance for A Complete Unknown
Chart (2025)	Peak position
Austrian Albums (Ö3 Austria)	75
Belgian Albums (Ultratop Flanders)	109
Belgian Albums (Ultratop Wallonia)	141
Japanese Albums (Oricon)	47
UK Americana Albums (Official Charts)	5
UK Compilation Albums (Official Charts)	6
UK Soundtrack Albums (Official Charts)	1
US Soundtrack Albums (Billboard)	17
US Top Album Sales (Billboard)	44

== Release history ==
Region	Date	Format(s)	Label	Ref.
Various	December 20, 2024	Digital download; streaming	Columbia	
Various	January 24, 2025	Vinyl	Columbia	
Various	February 28, 2025	CD	Columbia	

== Accolades ==
Award	Date of ceremony	Category	Nominee(s)	Result	Ref.
Grammy Awards	February 1, 2026	Best Compilation Soundtrack for Visual Media	Nick Baxter, James Mangold (compilation producers); Steven Gizicki (compilation producer/music supervisor); Timothée Chalamet (artist)	Nominated	
Hollywood Music in Media Awards	November 20, 2024	Song – Onscreen Performance (Film)	"Blowin' in the Wind" – Timothée Chalamet	Nominated	
Hollywood Music in Media Awards	November 20, 2024	Music Supervision – Film	Steven Gizicki	Nominated	
San Diego Film Critics Society Awards	December 9, 2024	Best Use of Music	A Complete Unknown	Won	
St. Louis Film Critics Association	December 15, 2024	Best Soundtrack	A Complete Unknown	Won	
