= Stephen Elliott (author) =

American writer, editor, and filmmaker

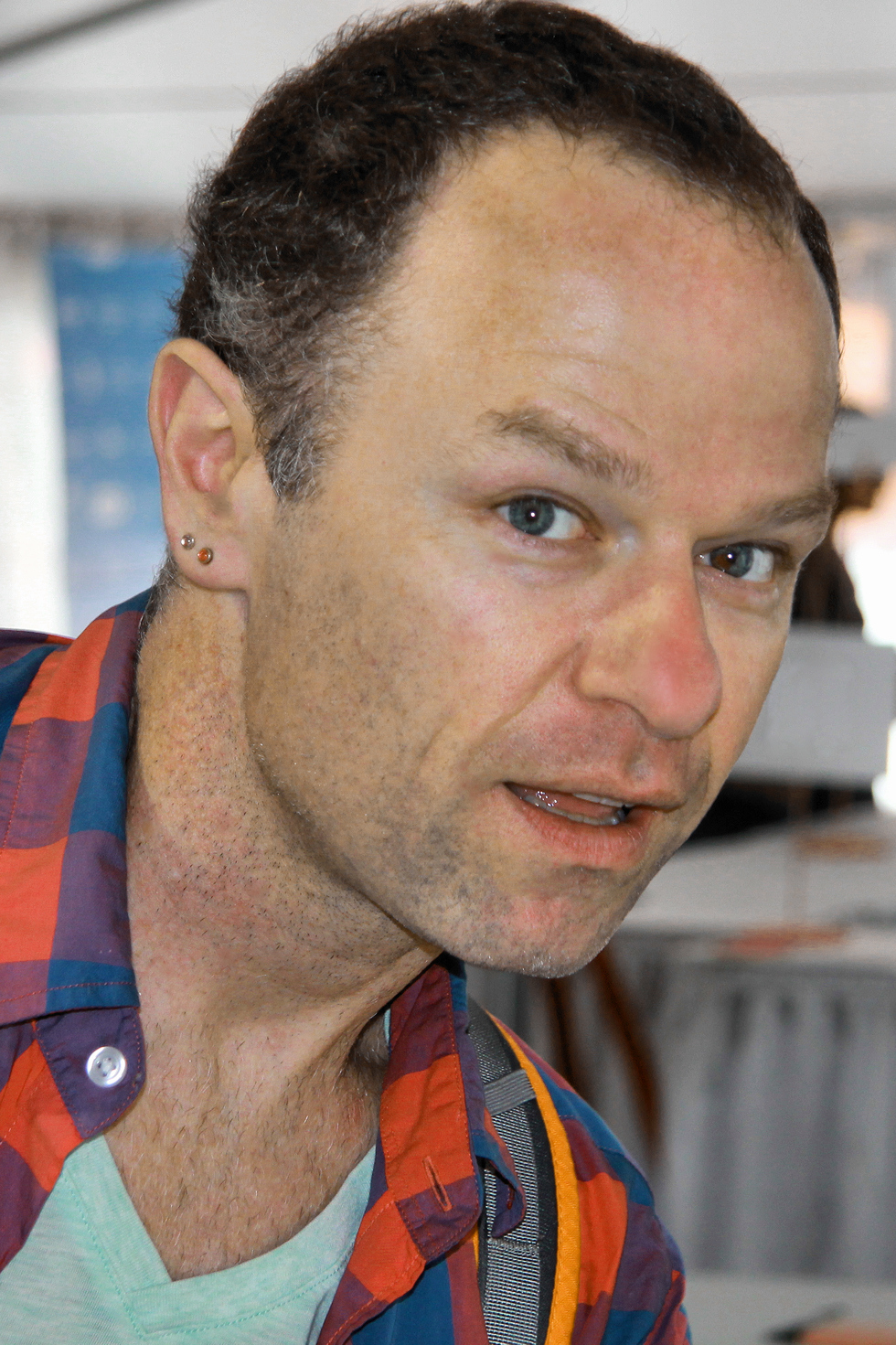
- Elliott at the 2013 Texas Book Festival.
- Born: December 3, 1971 (age 54); United States
- Education: Mather High School; University of Illinois at Urbana-Champaign; Northwestern University
- Occupations: Journalist; writer; editor; filmmaker; activist
- Writing career
- Genres: Novel; filmmaker
- Notable work: Happy Baby 2004, The Adderall Diaries 2009
- Notable awards: Stegner Fellowship
- Website: stephenelliott.com

Stephen Elliott (born December 3, 1971) is an American writer, editor, and filmmaker who has written and published seven books and directed two films. He is the founder and former editor-in-chief of the online literary magazine The Rumpus. In December 2014, he became senior editor at Epic Magazine.

== Background and education ==
Elliott grew up in Chicago. In his adolescence, he was made a ward of the court and placed in several group homes. He attended Mather High School and the University of Illinois, and went on to receive his master's degree in cinema studies from Northwestern University in 1996. In 2001, he was awarded the Stegner Fellowship from Stanford University, given to emerging writers in fiction and poetry. He was then the Marsh McCall lecturer in creative writing at Stanford University. Elliott is Jewish on his father's side.

== Books and journalism ==
Elliott went on the campaign trail and wrote a book about the 2004 U.S. presidential race, Looking Forward to It: or, How I Learned to Stop Worrying About It and Love the American Electoral Process. His novel Happy Baby, edited by Dave Eggers and co-published by McSweeney's and MacAdam/Cage, was released in February 2004. The paperback of Happy Baby was published by Picador in January 2005. His book My Girlfriend Comes to the City and Beats Me Up is a collection of S&M erotica, sometimes referred to as a sexual memoir, published by Cleis Press in 2006.

In April 2007, he published an essay about his experiment of not using the Internet for one month, writing: "I could feel my attention span lengthening. I would think about problems until I figured them out."

In 2008, he started The Rumpus, an online cultural commentary site.

In 2009, he published a true-crime memoir about the Hans Reiser murder trial called The Adderall Diaries, which was adapted into the 2015 film of the same name, in which James Franco played Elliott.

== Films ==
In 2012, Elliott directed the film About Cherry, based on a script written by Lorelei Lee and himself. The film starred Ashley Hinshaw, James Franco and Dev Patel, and debuted at the 2012 Berlin International Film Festival.

In December 2012, Elliott raised the funds via Kickstarter to shoot his second film, Happy Baby, based on his novel of the same name. Production was completed on July 7, 2013 and the movie was released in 2016.

== Allegations of sexual harassment and defamation suit ==
In November 2015, Claire Vaye Watkins published an essay in Tin House describing an incident where Elliott asked repeatedly, while visiting her program as a guest writer, if he could sleep in her bed, and later sent out a newsletter describing the incident in a way that left her feeling shamed for his own behavior. In 2017, Elliott was included on the "Shitty Media Men" list, a crowd-sourced Google spreadsheet containing allegations of sexual misconduct against men in the media industry. The allegations against Elliott included "rape accusations, sexual harassment" and "coercion". In October 2018, Elliott filed a lawsuit against the person who started the spreadsheet, journalist Moira Donegan. The lawsuit was settled in March 2023, with Elliott receiving a six-figure settlement from Donegan.

After Elliott filed the suit against Donegan, according to The Daily Beast, former Rumpus managing editor Lyz Lenz accused Elliott of groping her and described on Twitter an incident where Elliott "hounded" her about watching a movie in his hotel room. However the Daily Beast does not quote Lenz as saying Elliott groped her, and Lenz's tweets linked in the Daily Beast article have since been deleted. In an article in The Stranger, some of the accusations by Lenz were called into question.

== Published works ==
Novels

- Jones Inn (1998)
- A Life Without Consequences (2001)
- What It Means to Love you (2002)
- Happy Baby (2004)

Essays and Non-fiction

- Looking Forward to It: Or, How I Learned to Stop Worrying and Love the American Electoral Process (2004)
- The Adderall Diaries: A Memoir of Moods, Masochism, and Murder (2009)
- Sometimes I Think About It: Essays (2017)

Short story collections

- My Girlfriend Comes to the City and Beats Me Up (2006)

Films

- About Cherry (2012)
- Happy Baby (2016)
- After Adderall (2016)

== Awards ==
- 2001 Stegner Fellowship
