= The Art of Elysium =

American nonprofit organization for community arts

- Founded: August 17, 1997; 29 years ago
- Founder: Jennifer Howell
- Type: Nonprofit organization
- Legal status: 501(c)(3) organization
- Location(s): 3278 Wilshire Blvd; Los Angeles, CA 90010
- Region served: Los Angeles, California; New York City, New York
- Website: theartofelysium.org

The Art of Elysium (TAOE), founded in 1997, is an American nonprofit organization that provides community arts programs and artist services. Headquartered in Los Angeles, California, it organizes monthly workshops in fashion, film, theater, music, and visual arts for communities facing challenges, while also rendering career resources for participating volunteer artists. In January 2016, the organization partnered with SAG-AFTRA and the American Film Institute to support President Obama's "Call to Arts" initiative to complete 1 million hours of mentorship for young artists.

In February 2016, TAOE and Rabbit Bandini Productions co-launched Elysium Bandini Studios, a non-profit film studio and streaming entertainment network established to help financially support the charity. The organization has received additional financial contributions from its fundraising initiatives. The Art of Elysium has benefited 30,000 individuals annually, and nurtured and supported over 2,150 artists a year

== History ==
The Art of Elysium was established in 1997 by Jennifer Howell. After spending extensive time in hospitals visiting a dear friend Steven Hatton battling Leukemia, Jennifer saw the loneliness and isolation of sick children whose parents were doing their best to balance their responsibilities. One of his last wishes was for her to find a way to help those children. The Art of Elysium originally began as a way to provide arts programs for hospitalized children but has now grown to offer art workshops to struggling communities, artist resources, events, and charity fundraising. The name was derived from Greek mythology, incorporating "Elysium", a synonym for heaven. TAOE started with 33 volunteer artists. Its initial workshops were offered at Children's Hospital Los Angeles.

In January 2008, the organization initiated the Heaven gala, an annual fundraiser. The following year, in 2009, it expanded operations to New York City. By 2012, the membership included 4,000 volunteer artists. The organization facilitated programs at 17 hospitals, hospices, special-needs schools and outpatient facilities in Los Angeles, and five hospitals in New York City. It later developed community programs for the elderly and homeless individuals. In December 2015, the organization announced a new chairman of the board, Timothy Headington, replacing Ryan Kavanaugh. In January 2016, it partnered with SAG-AFTRA and the American Film Institute to complete 1 million hours of mentorship for young artists.

== Elysium Bandini Studios ==
In February 2016, TAOE and Rabbit Bandini Productions co-launched Elysium Bandini Studios (EBS), a nonprofit film studio and streaming entertainment network established to help financially support the charity. EBS raised $698,000 from an Indiegogo campaign to fund its initial three films. The studio's early film projects included Memoria and Yosemite. On January 9, 2017, its streaming network went live. The platform later featured a video series directed by Andrew Ondrejcak that included volunteer artists. In 2018, an EBS production, Obey Giant, won a Webby People's Voice Award in Film & Video – Documentary: Individual Episode Longform.

== Programs ==
=== Community arts ===
TAOE provides community arts programs in fashion, film/theater, music, and visual arts. The organization has partnered with hospitals, schools, homeless shelters and eldercare facilities. In 2018, it was reported to offer 110 programs per month and serve over 30,000 individuals per year.

=== Artist services ===
TAOE renders artist services through events, career resources, and financial awards. The organization's "Art Salon" events feature artists' work through evenings of musical performances, panel discussions, and culinary innovations all in order to raise more money to continue funding their programs.

== Timeline ==
=== 1997 ===
- The Art of Elysium's First Workshop at Children's Hospital Los Angeles.
- The Art of Elysium filed for 501 (c) 3 status.
- The Art of Elysium Monthly Music Showcases at The Mint.
- The Art of Elysium Monthly Comedy Showcases at The Comedy Store.

=== 1998 ===
- The Art of Elysium received preliminary 501 (c) 3 status.
- The Art of Elysium presents Jenine De Shazer and Henry Diltz at the Hollywood Entertainment Museum.

=== 1999 ===
- The Art of Elysium received permanent 501 (c) 3 status.
- The Art of Elysium Presents Jule Rotenberg hosted by Giovanni Ribisi.
- The Art of Elysium finds home with Tom Shadyac at Shadyacres.

=== 2000 ===
- The Art of Elysium Presents Darin Fenn hosted by Balthazar Getty.

=== 2003 ===
- The Art of Elysium Presents Russell Young hosted by Patricia Arquette.

=== 2004 ===
- The Art of Elysium collaborates with GQ hosted by Scarlett Johansson and Thomas Jane.
- The Art of Elysium collaborates with GQ, presents Jonah Blechman's U-Ware
- The Art of Elysium launches Betty & Veronica Apparel in association with Miramax and Archie Comics
- The Art of Elysium presents Tone Stockenstrom hosted by Jeremy Sisto and Brad Rowe
- The Art of Elysium presents Thom Bierdz hosted by Scarlett Johansson

=== 2005 ===
- The Art of Elysium presents Russell Young, hosted by Balthazar Getty and Joaquin Phoenix

=== 2006 ===
- The Art of Elysium in collaboration with Village at the Lift Sundance
- The Art of Elysium collaborates with HOW I MET YOUR MOTHER
- The Art of ElysiumXEsquire present Michael Muller.
- The Art of Elysium collaborates with HOW I MET YOUR MOTHER.
- The Art of Elysium in collaboration with Dolce & Gabbana, hosted by Penelope Cruz.
- The Art of Elysium fundraiser with Matthew McConaughey.

=== 2007 ===
- The Art of ElysiumXCartier with Rachel Bilson & Ben Affleck.

=== 2008 ===
- The Art of Elysium Presents HEAVEN Celebrating 10 Years of Service.
- The Art of ElysiumXCartier Love Bracelet Nicole Richie & Joel Madden.
- The Art of Elysium Presents Mick Rock & Russell Young Hosted by Riley Keough & Elijah Wood.
- The Art of ElysiumXCartier With Kelly Ripa & Mark Consuelos.
- The Art of ElysiumXGrantLove Supported by Alexandra Grant and Keanu Reeves.

=== 2009 ===
- The Art of ElysiumXCartier Love Day with Eva Mendes.
- The Art of Elysium, in collaboration with Ballroom Marfa, MASQUERADE MARFA.

=== 2010 ===
- The Art of ElysiumXEva Mendes Variety's POWER OF WOMEN Award.

=== 2011 ===
- The Art of Elysium presents THE DYNAMITER at the Berlin Film Festival.
- The Art of Elysium presents Shane Edelman, hosted by Michael Rapaport & Brad Rowe.
- The Art of Elysium collaborates with Lucky Brand Jeans, hosted by Tim Gunn.
- The Art of Elysium produces FOREVER, directed By Tatia Pilieva.

=== 2012 ===
- The Art of Elysium X LA Art Show.
- The Art of Elysium presents PIECES OF HEAVEN.
- The Art of Elysium presents Sam Bayer.

=== 2013 ===
- The Art of Elysium collaborates with Brian Bowen Smith, Marc Jacobs and Selma Blair.

=== 2014 ===
- The Art of Elysium presents CHILD OF GOD at Venice Film Festival.
- The Art of Elysium presents Gregory Siff.
- The Art of Elysium xSara Von Kiegger present Ryan Heffington.

=== 2015 ===
- The Art of Elysium presents the film YOSEMITE.

=== 2016 ===
- The Art of Elysium in collaboration with the Imperial Ball.

=== 2017 ===
- The Art of Elysium presents James Goldcrown.
- The Art of Elysium presents Mike Rosenthal.
- The Art of Elysium presents film OBEY GIANT and Shepard Fairey.
- The Art of ElysiumXRefinery 29 present 29 Rooms, 2017.

=== 2018 ===
- The Art of ElysiumXRefinery 29 present 29 Rooms, 2018.
- The Art of Elysium presents Beau Dunn in collaboration with Pop Chips.

=== 2019 ===
- The Art of Elysium presents DON'T COME BACK FROM THE MOON.

=== 2024 ===
- The Art of ElysiumXFrieze celebrate Amanda Fairey.
- The Art of ElysiumXCastXEva Mendes.
- The Art of ElysiumXLuna Luna.
- The Art of ElysiumXCastXNyakio Grieco.

=== Awards ===
TAOE has established four awards for volunteers: the Amber Award for fashion designers, the Tahnee Award for filmmakers, the David Award for musicians/dancers, and the Jacques Award for visual artists.

== Events ==
=== Annual Events ===
- Heaven, initiated in 2008, is an annual fundraising gala held in Los Angeles. In 2009, the organization first presented the event's Visionary award for creative merit. The award recipient organizes the event design and curates an art installation with their own conceptualization of heaven. TAOE also established the Spirit of Elysium award for artists' community service.
- Pieces of Heaven, initiated in 2008, is an annual art auction fundraiser in Los Angeles.
- Little Pieces of Heaven is an arts showcase in Los Angeles that includes the artwork of community program participants.
- Genesis, initiated in 2009, is an annual art exhibit and concert fundraiser in Los Angeles.
- Paradis, initiated in 2009, is an annual fundraiser in Cannes, France.

=== Special Events ===
- Cartier Love Day. In June 2009, for Cartier's fourth annual Love Day initiative, charity ambassador Eva Mendes designed a silk bracelet, the sale of which benefited The Art of Elysium.
- L'Wren Scott Amber Award. In March 2014, The Art of Elysium announced the creation of the L’Wren Scott Amber Award, which honors fashion designer L'Wren Scott and Amber, one of the first children with whom the organization worked. The award is given to emerging fashion designers, enabling them to donate their time and talents to hospitalized children, and offering them the opportunity to create a small line of clothing to benefit Elysium.
- Tiffany & Co. HardWear Collection Party. On April 26, 2017, a Tiffany & Co. jewelry preview party, hosted by actors Zoë Kravitz and Riley Keough, was held at The Art of Elysium's Elysium Art Salons in Los Angeles.

=== Events during COVID ===
While the organization was unable to hold its usual events during the height of the COVID-19 pandemic, it organized or participated in a number of alternative events and projects, including:

- DRIVEN: A Latinx Artist Celebration. A drive-thru exhibit at the Hollywood Palladium in October 2020 celebrating Latinx musicians and artists.
- Shepard Fairey art installation. A socially distanced mural display at the Hollywood Palladium featuring the work of artist and activist Shepard Fairey.
- Going Home: a picture show. A socially distanced installation featuring the work of immunocompromised artist Torie Zalben.
- Bourn Kind: The Tiny Kindness Project. The Art of Elysium co-produced a documentary short film about a Black-Jewish street artist who creates a mural project to celebrate kindness and foster connection in his community. The film had its world premiere at the 2022 Tribeca Festival.
- NFT Projects. The organization participated in a number of NFT projects, including Nathaniel Parrott's “How to Kill a Wildflower,” The Futureverse Foundation, Dree Hemingway's "On: Dreams," and Buffalo Trace Distillery's vintage whiskey auction.

== Press ==
- Forbes: How The Art Of Elysium's Celebrity-Packed Heaven Gala Is Helping The City Of Angels
- Voyage LA Magazine: Meet Jennifer Howell of The Art of Elysium
- LA Times: The Art of Elysium's 10-year gala
- The Hollywood Reporter: Artist Shepard Fairey Partners With Art of Elysium for Installation at Hollywood Palladium
- Ok! Magazine: Art, Music, and Philanthropy Collide at The Art of Elysium's Glamorous Art Salon Attended by Christina Hendricks and Alicia Witt

== Award recipients ==
Year	Visionary	Spirit of Elysium	Refs
2009	Jim Sheridan	Eva Mendes	
2010	Shepard Fairey	Kirsten Dunst	
2011	Mark Mothersbaugh	James Franco	
2012	Cameron Silver	Elijah Wood	
2013	Colleen Atwood	David Arquette	
2014	Linda Perry	Hayes MacArthur, Ali Larter	
2015	Marina Abramović	Finola Hughes	
2016	Vivenne Westwood, Andreas Kronthaler	Russell Young	
2017	Stevie Wonder	Camilla Belle	
2018	John Legend	Shanola Hampton	
2019	Michael Muller	Beau Dunn	
2020	We Are Hear	Topher Grace, Ashley Grace	
2021	Colette Miller	[Cara Santana]	
2022	Perry Farrell	Perry Farrell	
2023	Anthony James	Anthony James	
2024	Neil Gaiman	Amy Smart & Carter Oosterhouse	
2025	Lee Daniels	Aly Michalka & AJ Michalka	
