= Jennifer Howell (social activist) =

American film producer and social activist

Jennifer K. Howell
- Born: Jennifer Kristen Howell
- Other name: Jen Howell
- Occupations: Film producer, actor and social activist
- Years active: 1997-present
- Known for: The Art of Elysium
- Website: www.jenniferkhowell.com

Jen K. Howell is an American film producer, actress, and social activist. She is the founder of The Art of Elysium, a nonprofit organisation, and Elysium Bandini Studios, a nonprofit film production company. Howell received the Walter Littlefield Distinguished Speaker in Rhetoric and Communication Award in 2012. She is known for producing films such as "Don't Come Back from the Moon", "The Heyday of the Insensitive Bastards", "Forever", and Webby Awards winning documentary film "Obey Giant". She also produced the 2012 short documentary "The Art of Elysium Stories", which was nominated for the 3rd Annual Shorty Social Good Awards in the best video series category.

== Early life ==
Howell was born and raised in Hattiesburg, Mississippi, where she completed her early education at North Forrest High School. She left Mississippi at the age of 18 to attend Emerson College, where she graduated with a B.A. in Mass Communication in Films in 1996. She worked in San Francisco as an event planner before moving to Los Angeles to pursue a career as a screenwriter.

== Career ==
Howell began her acting career with David Gregory's 1995 film "Scathed" and later played Cora Tull in the 2013 film "As I Lay Dying". She started volunteering at the Children's Hospital in Los Angeles with a group of friends, most of whom were artists. In the autumn of 1997, she founded The Art of Elysium after one of her close friends was diagnosed with leukaemia. In January 2016, her organization partnered with SAG-AFTRA and the American Film Institute to support President Obama's "Call to Arts" initiative to complete one million hours of mentorship for young artists.

Since venturing into production with the 2011 film "The Dynamiter", she has been involved in several films as a producer and executive producer, including "The Color of Time", "Don Quixote", "The Heyday of the Insensitive Bastards", "Yosemite", "Forever". In February 2016, she co-founded Elysium Bandini Studios, a nonprofit film studio and streaming entertainment network established to help financially support the charity. The studio's early film projects included "Memoria" and "Yosemite". In 2012, she produced a short documentary "The Art of Elysium Stories", which was nominated for the 3rd Annual Shorty Social Good Awards in the best video series category. She also co-produced "Obey Giant: The Art and Dissent of Shepard Fairey", which won a Webby People's Voice Award in Film & Video – Documentary: Individual Episode Longform in 2018.

=== Filmography ===
List of selected notable films produced by Howell:

- 2019, Samir
- 2017, Obey Giant
- 2017, The Mad Whale
- 2017, Don't Come Back from the Moon
- 2017, Actors Anonymous
- 2015, Memoria
- 2015, Forever
- 2015, The Heyday of the Insensitive Bastards
- 2015, Yosemite
- 2015, Don Quixote
- 2012, The Color of Time
- 2011, The Dynamiter

As actor

- 2013, As I Lay Dying as Cora Tull
- 1995, Scathed

== Activism ==
In April 2014, Howell organized a protest outside The Beverly Hills Hotel, California in response to Brunei's anti-gay laws. The protest was joined by various high profile individuals, including members of the fashion industry, charitable arts organizations, and a local labor union. Notable attendees included Decades boutique co-owner Cameron Silver, designer Gregory Parkinson, and members of Unite Here 11, a union representing hospitality workers. Howell's initiative aimed to redirect guests to other hotels and raise awareness about Brunei's discriminatory policies, highlighting the intersection of human rights and corporate responsibility.

== Depp v. Heard trial ==
Howell was one of the key witnesses to testify on behalf of Johnny Depp in the 2022 Depp v. Heard trial. The pre-recorded deposition was played in court for around 15 minutes. Her testimony contradicted Henriquez's testimony, but much of the context was stripped away from the jury. Howell was also presented with an email she had written to Whitney in 2020 upon learning that Whitney would be supporting Heard in the UK trial. Although the email's content was not disclosed during the court proceedings, it was leaked on social media.

In Howell's declaration, she expressed upset upon learning that Amber Heard had pledged millions of dollars to the American Civil Liberties Union and a children's hospital, which according to Heard's publicist, were more prominent than The Art of Elysium, the nonprofit she ran and that had employed Whitney Henriquez. Amber Heard testified that she donated $250,000 to The Art of Elysium; however, Howell denied this claim, stating that around 2018, the organisation only received one donation made in Heard's name, a payment of $250,000 from an anonymous donor believed to be Elon Musk.

In July 2020, Howell, in a statement provided to Johnny Depp's lawyers, claimed that the Tesla car Elon Musk gave to Amber Heard had a bugging device. The company declined to comment on her claim, but people close to Elon Musk denied the allegation. Howell also claimed that Amber Heard's mother, who died in May 2020, favoured Johnny Depp over Musk, whom she described as "controlling". She mentioned that she met Heard's late mother, Paige Heard, who shared secrets about Amber's relationship with Musk after her breakup with Johnny Depp.

== Awards and recognition ==
Howell was honoured with the Walter Littlefield Distinguished Speaker in Rhetoric and Communication Award in 2012 and was listed as one of the ten most inspiring women in Los Angeles by Los Angeles magazine in 2013.
