= Playskool =

American company that produces educational toys and games

Playskool Inc.
- Formerly: The Playskool Institute (1928–1938)
- Type: Division (1928–68); Subsidiary (1968–84); Brand (1984–present)
- Founded: July 26, 1928; 98 years ago
- Founder: Lucille King
- Defunct: November 28, 1984; 41 years ago (as a company)
- Fate: Acquired by Milton Bradley in 1968, last factory closed in 1984, becoming a brand of Hasbro.
- Headquarters: Pawtucket, Rhode Island, United States
- Key people: Manuel Fink
- Products: Educational toys Games
- Brands: (see below)
- Net income: $23 million (1965)
- Number of employees: 700 (1984)
- Parent: John Lumber (1928–35); Thorncraft, Inc. (1935–68); Milton Bradley (1968–84); Hasbro (1984–present)
- Subsidiaries: J.L. Wright Co.; Halsam Co.

Playskool is an American brand of educational toys and games for preschoolers. The former Playskool manufacturing company was a subsidiary of the Milton Bradley Company and was headquartered in Chicago, Illinois. Playskool's last remaining plant in the aforementioned city was shut down in 1984, and Playskool became a brand of Hasbro, which had acquired Milton Bradley that same year. Amidst a major corporate restructuring at Hasbro, to focus on licensing, digital games and core toy brands in 2023, Hasbro has entered into licensing agreements with other toy companies, such as PlayMonster and Just Play, to outsource the brand's toy production.

== History ==
The "Playskool Institute" was established by Lucille King in 1928 as a division of the John Schroeder Lumber Company in Milwaukee, Wisconsin. King, an employee at the company, developed wooden toys to use as teaching aids for children in the classroom. In 1935, the Playskool Institute became a division of Thorncraft, Inc., and established offices in Chicago, Illinois. In 1938, Playskool was purchased by the Joseph Lumber Company, where Manuel Fink was placed in charge of operations. In 1940, Fink, along with Robert Meythaler, bought Playskool and established the "Playskool Manufacturing Company".

In 1943, Playskool bought the J.L. Wright Company, the manufacturer of Lincoln Logs. In 1958, Playskool merged with Holgate Toys, Inc., a wood product manufacturer based in Kane, Pennsylvania. In 1962, they purchased the Halsam Company, a producer of wooden blocks, checkers, dominoes, and construction sets. In 1968, Playskool became a subsidiary of Milton Bradley; both companies were acquired by Hasbro, Inc. in 1984.

After the acquisition, Playskool began operating out of Pawtucket, Rhode Island, as a division of Hasbro. In 1985, Playskool released a line of infant products under the Tommee Tippee brand name, including bibs and bottles. Many Hasbro products targeted at preschoolers were rebranded with the Playskool name, including Play-Doh and Tonka. Playskool also began licensing toys from other designers, creating licensing agreements to manufacture Teddy Ruxpin, Barney, Arthur, Teletubbies, and Nickelodeon branded products. Hasbro also began licensing the Playskool brand name to other vendors, manufacturing a number of products under the Playskool name, including books, baby care supplies, video games, and children's apparel.

In 2023, Hasbro entered into a licensing agreement with PlayMonster that would see the company take over the toy line, which was effective by the following year.

In 2025, Just Play, under license from Hasbro, announced a relaunch of the Playskool brand, with the release of a toy collection.

== Products ==
Playskool produced many lines of educational toys and games for children. Playskool's signature brands and toys include Mr. Potato Head, Tonka, Alphie, Weebles, Play-Doh, Sesame Street toys, and Gloworm.

Playskool creates products for newborn to preschool-aged children; products like the Kick Start Gym, Step Start Walk 'n Ride, and the Tummy Time line are aimed at developing the motor skills of babies. Several toys, like Playskool's Pipeworks, Go Go Gears, and Busy Basics lines, were created to allow children to express creativity. Playskool also produces several dolls and action figures, including Dolly Surprise and Kota the Triceratops. During the 1970s, Playskool also released a toy series named "Familiar Places" which included several toy buildings along with vehicles and toy people, including a McDonald's restaurant, Holiday Inn hotel and Texaco gas station.

Playskool released toys based on television programmes aimed at preschool children like Sesame Street, Top Wing, In the Night Garden..., Boohbah, Bob the Builder, and Rubbadubbers.

Playskool heroes toys feature characters from various properties in a scale more suited for younger children. These figures are similar to Fisher-Price's Imaginext.

== Brands ==
Playskool brands included:

- Allegra's Window (1994–2006)
- Arthur (1996–2000)
- Baby Einstein
- Barney (1993–2005) (Note: Moved to Fisher-Price.)
- Bob the Builder (2001–2004) Moved to Learning Curve
- Boohbah (2004–06)
- Bragnam
- Chappy (1972–85)
- Chuck and Friends
- Clipo
- Cool Crew
- Definitely Dinosaurs
- Dragon Tales (1999–2000)
- The Furchester Hotel (Late 2010s) (Note: In Europe.)
- Genius Quiz Machine
- Glo Friends
- Go-Bots
- Gullah Gullah Island (1994–2006)
- In the Night Garden... (2007–10s)
- Jurassic Park Junior (2001–15)
- Jurassic World Dino Tracker
- Marvel Super Hero Adventures
- Mister Frosty
- Mr. Potato Head
- Moon and me
- Noodleboro
- Peppa Pig (2021-) (Note: moved from Fisher-Price.)
- Pipeworks
- PJ Masks (2021-) (Note: Moved from Just Play.)
- Poppin' Park
- Power Rangers (2019–)
- Rubbadubbers related products (2004)
- Sesame Street (1980s–2022)
- Sid the Science Kid (2008–13)
- Speedstars
- Stanley (2002–06)
- Star Wars Jedi Force
- Star Wars Galaxy Heroes
- Super Monsters
- Talk 'n Play
- Teletubbies (1998-2000) (Note: Moved to Microsoft ActiMates.)
- Top Wing (2017–20)
- Tweenies (2000–04)
- Transformers: Rescue Bots (2011–)
- VideoNow Jr. (2004-2007)
- Weebles
- Wheel Pals

== Slogans ==
Slogan	Years Used
Our toys make good friends	1970s
Feeling good about the Playskool years	1985–1992
What will they think of next?	1992–1997
Wanna play with us?	1997–1999
Come and Discover!	2000–2001
Here I Come, World!	2001–2002
Playskool Plays Kool	2002–2004
Let's Play!	2004–2007
When Play Comes First...	2006-2007
Believe in PLAY	2007–2009
More Than Play	2009–2011
P.S. It's Playskool	2011–2012
This School Rocks!	2012–present

== See also ==
- LEGO Duplo
- Fisher-Price
- Little Tikes
