= List of companies based in Newcastle upon Tyne =

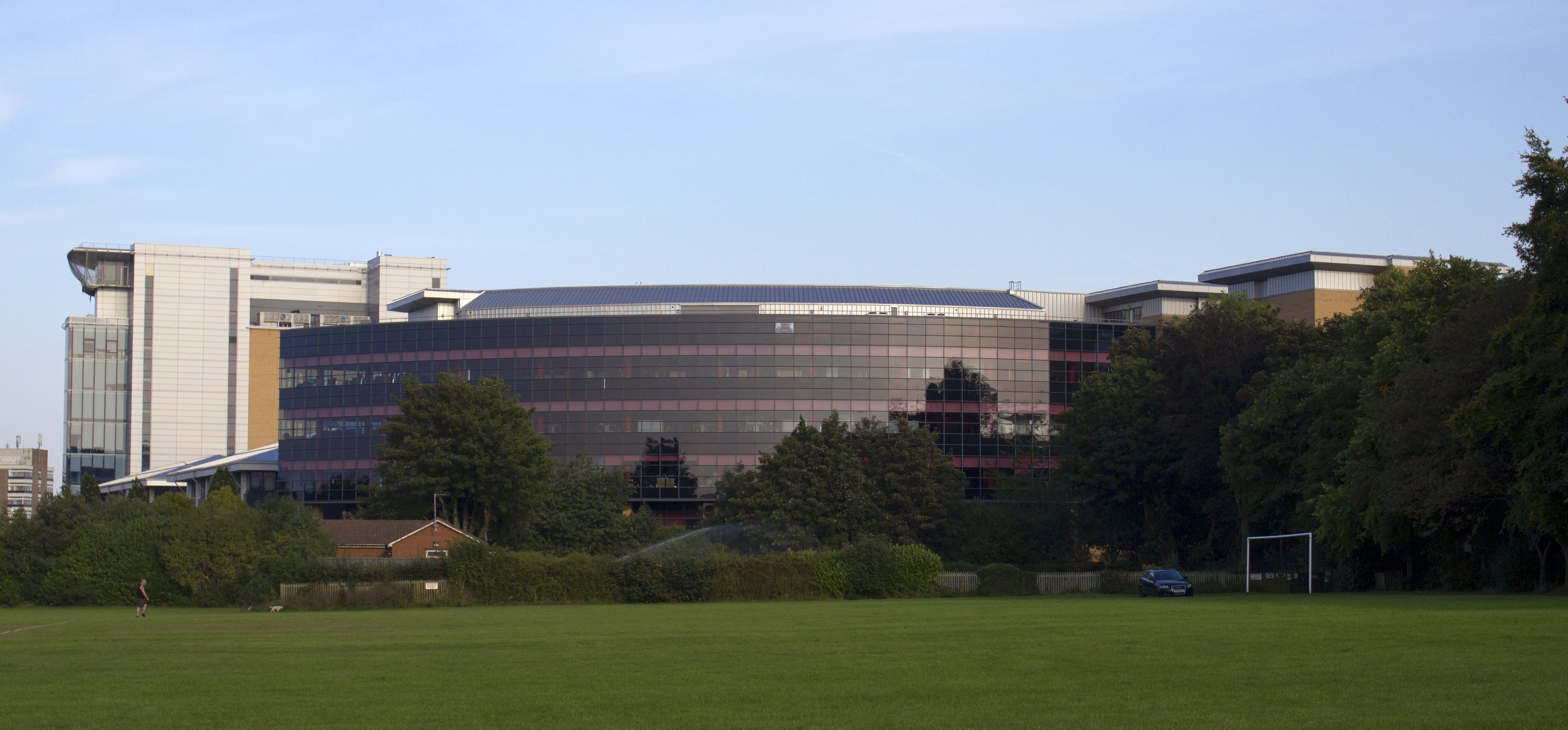
Virgin Money have their headquarters in the Gosforth suburb of Newcastle upon Tyne

This is a list of companies whose British or regional headquarters are located in Newcastle upon Tyne or in nearby North Tyneside.

- AkzoNobel
- Be-Ro
- Bellway
- Fenwick
- Formica Corporation
- Go-Ahead Group
- Goldsmiths
- Greggs
- Newcastle Building Society
- Palringo
- Parkdean Holidays
- Reid & Sons
- Tapirs Technologies
- The Sage Group
- Virgin Money UK
- Tommee Tippee
- Baltic Apprenticeships
- Ringtons, tea and coffee merchants, dates from 1907 when Samuel Smith OBE moved from his home town of Leeds and began selling tea from a horse and cart in the city.

== Companies with other bases of significant importance in Newcastle and North Tyneside ==
- Accenture (Cobalt Business Park)
- BAE Systems (Vickers Armstrong works, Scotswood Road)
- British Airways (offices in Benwell and Scotswood)
- CloudARM (IT Consultancy)
- Clubhouse Gaming CIC (Social Gaming Club)
- Convergys (main UK site in Quorum Business Park, circa 800 employees)
- Department for Work and Pensions
- Eutechnyx
- Inland Revenue (National Insurance Contributions Office)
- EE (offices/call centre in Wallsend)
- Ubisoft (Ubisoft Reflections studio)
- DXC Technology
- 3t Training ( Global Wind Organisation training centre )
