= Gregory Siff =

American dramatist

Greg Siff
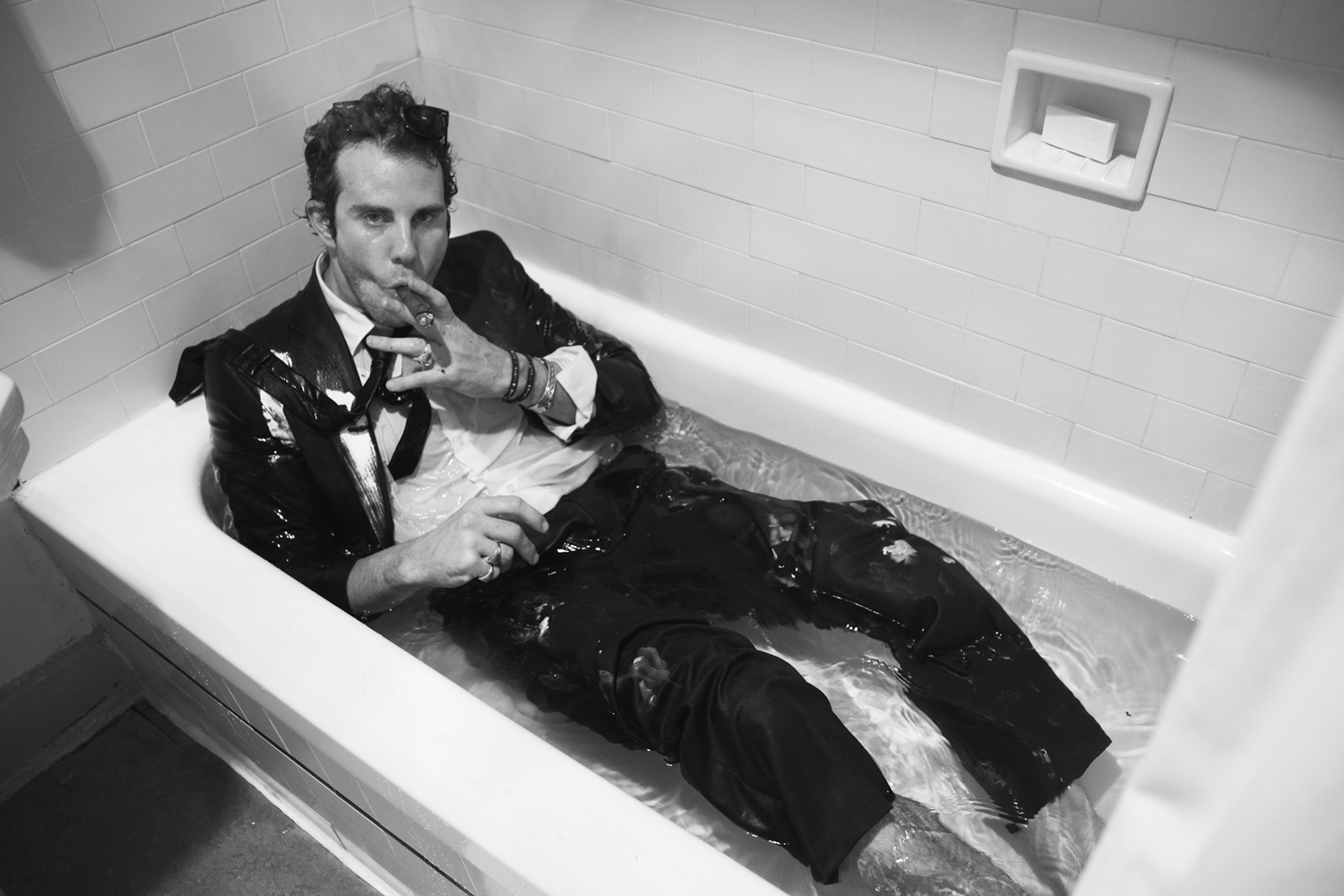
- "Portrait of the Artist," Chateau Series, Cottage 84, by Steve Erle in 2013
- Born: December 21, 1977 (age 48); Brooklyn, New York, New York, U.S.
- Occupations: Visual artist, designer, writer, actor
- Website: www.gregorysiff.com

Gregory "Greg" Siff (born December 21, 1977) is an American visual artist, designer, writer and actor who lives and works in Los Angeles.

== Art career ==
Siff was born in Brooklyn, New York. He creates images that incorporate Pop Art and Abstract-expressionism. His style merges elements of abstraction and urban art.

Siff's first exhibition, "the heartfirebreathemanifesto" was hosted at the Standard Hotel in Hollywood on February 13, 2006, with all proceeds from this exhibit donated to J.U.i.C.E. (Justice by Uniting in Creative Energy). Since 2006, Siff has exhibited all over the world, including Los Angeles, New York, London, Italy, Dublin, and Vancouver.

Siff has done commissions and installations for Deitch Projects, The Standard Hotel, Mercedes Benz, Tumblr, Christie's, Sotheby's, Vans, Red Bull, The Art of Elysium, Siren Studios, Wexlers Deli, and Warner Bros. Records, among others. In addition, Siff has collaborated with artists RISK, James Georgopoulos, 2wenty, and Beau Dunn. His work has been seen in publications such as Interview, Treats Magazine, The Wall Street Journal, LA Times, Complex, and LA Weekly.

In Spring 2013, Siff was selected by Vans Custom Culture to be one of their "Art Ambassadors", inspiring students across the United States to embrace their creativity. His hand-painted custom Vans sneakers were on view at The Whitney Museum of American Art in New York City. Siff's work can be seen at ACE Museum in Los Angeles where he painted a mural for a charity art auction held by renowned auction house Christie's and non-profit The Art of Elysium.

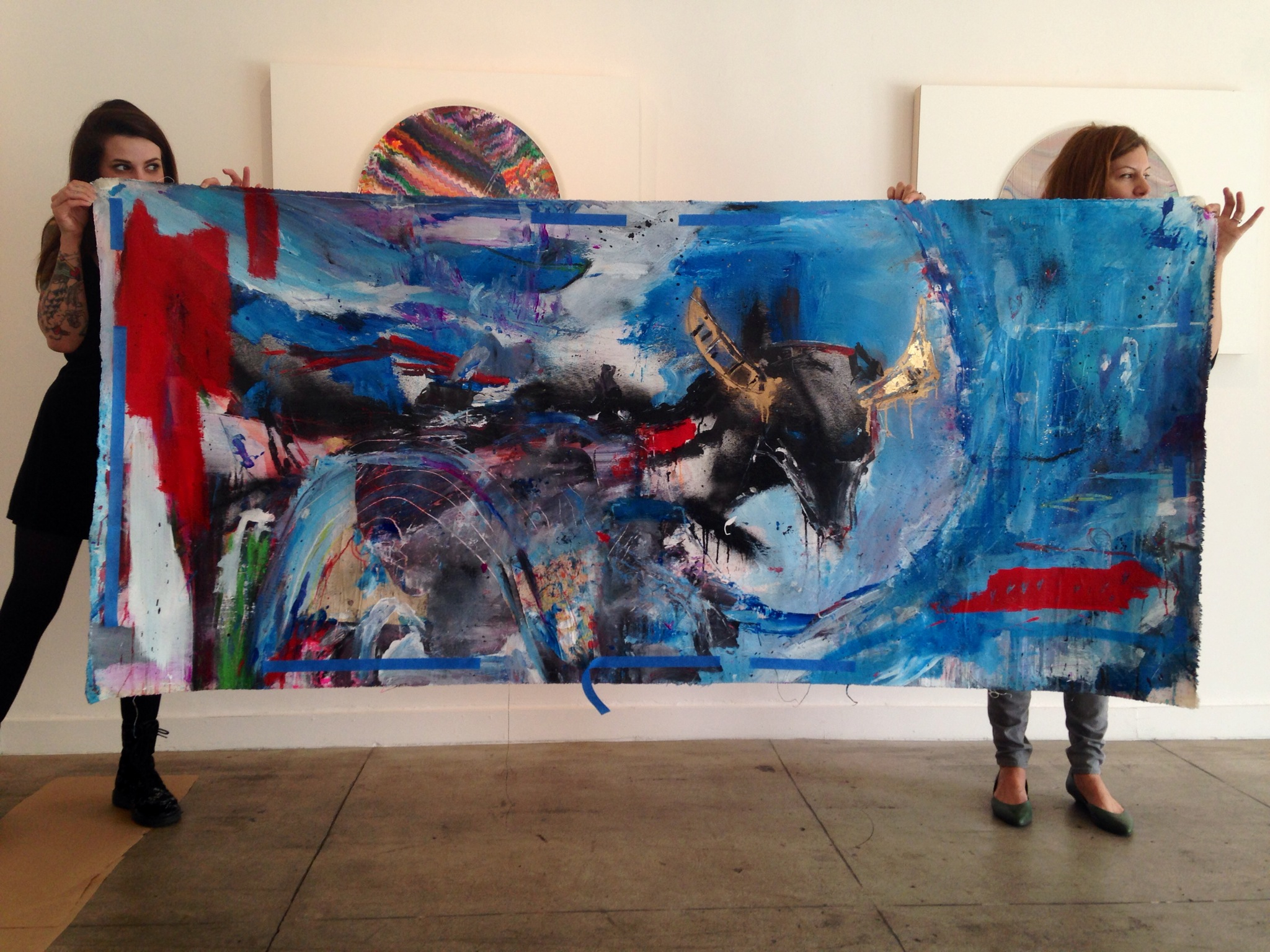
bullfight in a motion picture industry, by Gregory Siff, 2014, 42 in × 70 in (110 cm × 180 cm), acrylic, gold-leaf, black diamond dust, spray paint and oil crayon on canvas

In October 2013 Siff collaborated with Helmut Lang and Project Angel Food, a Los Angeles-based charity whose mission is to help those affected by HIV/AIDS, Cancer, Diabetes, and other life-threatening diseases. In this collaboration he hand painted 21 limited edition, one of a kind Helmut Lang tees. "The line work, characters, and poetry aimed to nourish the body and spirit, just as Project Angel Food does with their mission," said Siff. The private event was held on October 17 at Helmut Lang's flagship store on Melrose Avenue in West Hollywood, CA. All 21 tees were sold out and 100% of the proceeds from the sale of these original works benefited Project Angel Food.

In April 2014, the Santa Monica Museum of Art showcased a recreation of Siff's downtown Los Angeles art studio where he painted 50 portraits of the homeless youth he encountered while spending a day at the Safe Place For Youth for the Face 2 Face Fundraising Gala.

Also in April 2014, Siff exhibited in the Santa Monica Museum of Art's Precognito/Incognito 10 alongside work from Ed Ruscha, John Baldessari, Sage Vaughn and Oscar Murillo.

In June 2014, Siff's work was included in The Museum of Modern Art PS1 exhibition 'Rockaway!' to celebrate the ongoing post-Superstorm Sandy Recovery. Curated by MoMA PS1's director Klaus Biesenbach, in close collaboration with Patti Smith, Rockaway Beach Surf Club, the Honolulu Biennal, and the Rockaway Artist Alliance, this group show included the "Experience Rooms," Siff painted in the Rockaway Beach Surf Club bathrooms. Other artists in the exhibition included Marina Abramovic, Patti Smith, Janet Cardiff, Brandon D'Leo, James Franco, Michael Stipe, Tom Sachs, and Adrián Villar Rojas.

In 2017, Siff collaborated with luxury fashion house Saint Laurent, bringing his imagery to the new Winter YSL 2017 Women's and Men's Ready to Wear Line.

In July 2021, Gregory Siff collaborated with New York Mets first baseman Pete Alonso for the 2021 MLB Home Run Derby at Coors Field in Denver. Siff created eight custom-painted baseball bats, provided by Alonso’s sponsor Dove Tail Bats, which Alonso used to win his second consecutive Derby title. The bats featured vibrant designs and phrases like “Family First,” “LFGM,” and “Molon Labe,” reflecting Alonso’s personal story, including a tribute to his grandfather with NYU-inspired purple, silver, and black colors. Described as “functional art” by Alonso, the bats were complemented by a merchandise line, with proceeds supporting Alonso’s charity, Homers for Heroes.

== Film, television and theater career ==
As an actor, Siff started out on stage at the New York City Opera at Lincoln Center. Among the operas he sang in were; Carmen, Tosca, Lucia, and Turandot. He has been cast in the dual role of Barry Williams/Greg Brady in Fox's True-Life story of, The Brady Bunch: The Final Days. In I.F.C.'s Rome & Jewel, a modern update of William Shakespeare's Romeo and Juliet, he played the role of Tybalt. He had a supporting role in the 2003 Kelly Clarkson and Justin Guarini film From Justin to Kelly, as Justin's friend "Brandon". He has also guest starred on Showtime's Nurse Jackie, HBO's, How to Make It in America, and C.S.I.: NY.

In 2008, Siff wrote and starred in, The Nothing Boys, a semi-autobiographical play about a young man who returns home to his high school for his 10-year reunion only to find one other student in attendance. The Nothing Boys was produced by Rob Weiss, best known as producer of HBO's Entourage. The play ran from May 2 through July 27 in Hollywood's Theater District. A portion of the proceeds from, The Nothing Boys was donated to Covenant House California.

In Spring 2010, Siff's experimental art short film, Sequential Paint, written and directed by Stephen Dackson, was a featured selection at the NewFilmmakers Series in New York City's Anthology Film Archives. The film also screened at various exhibits, art shows and galleries in Los Angeles, including the opener of the 2006 Santa Ana Film Festival.

As a voice actor Siff appears in the video game series, Grand Theft Auto as the voice and body of Rocco Pelosi. Rocco Pelosi is featured in Grand Theft Auto IV: The Ballad of Gay Tony (2009) and Grand Theft Auto V (2013).

== Filmography ==
=== Film ===
Year	Title	Role	Notes
1997	In & Out	Locker Room Guy	
2001	Boychick	Debate Boy	Short
2002	Power Rangers Time Force: Dawn of Destiny	Shouter	Video
2003	From Justin to Kelly	Brandon	
2005	River's End	Doug Barton	
2006	December Ends	Make-Out Guy	
2006	Rome & Jewel	Ty	
2007	The Take	Coroner	
2008	Doody Pants	Steve	Short
2011	The Lincoln Lawyer	Orderly	
2013	Kissing Lying Crying	Artist	Short
2021	The Male Gaze: Celluloid Dreams	Debate Boy	

=== Television ===
Year	Title	Role	Notes
1997	Late Night with Conan O'Brien	Romeo	Episode: "Episode #4.54"
2000	Undressed	Leo	Recurring Cast: Seasons 3
2000	Even Stevens	Quincy Dandridge	Episode: "Family Picnic"
2001	The Andy Dick Show	Tony	Episode: "Come Back Quentin"
2001	Power Rangers Time Force	Shouter	Episode: "Frax's Fury"
2002	Saturday Night Live	Eric's Fan	Episode: "Eric McCormack/Jay-Z"
2004	Girlfriends	Holden Hills	Episode: "A Comedy of Eros"
2006	CSI: NY	Evan Kelneck	Episode: "Consequences"
2007	Celebrity Deathmatch	Andy Milonakis (voice)	Episode: "Vince Vaughn vs. Owen Wilson"
2008	General Hospital: Night Shift	Bobby Duncan	Episode: "Other People's Children"
2010	How to Make It in America	Frank	Episode: "Big in Japan"
2010	Nurse Jackie	Line Guy #1	Episode: "Comfort Food"

=== Video Games ===
Year	Title	Role
2009	Grand Theft Auto IV: The Ballad of Gay Tony	Rocco Pelosi (voice)
2013	Grand Theft Auto V	Rocco Pelosi (voice)

== Selected exhibitions ==
=== 2006–2011 ===
- theheartfirebreathemanifesto, The Standard, Hollywood, CA. February 13, 2006
- The Marshmallow Show, The Standard Hotel, Hollywood, CA. November 12, 2006
- Don't You Let Me Go Tonight, Kaffe 1668 Gallery, TriBeCa, NY. January 2009
- G. (11–11–11), LA Fonderie, Los Angeles, CA. November 11–13, 2011

=== 2012 ===
- There & Back, Siren Studios Rooftop Sessions, Los Angeles, CA. March 1, 2012
- Matter of Time, Gallery Brown, Los Angeles, CA. October 20, 2012
- GetArt 5, Project Angel Food, Hollywood, CA, June 2, 2012
- The Usual Suspects – Lab Art, Los Angeles, CA. May 19, 2012
- D.I.Z.N.I., Graffik Gallery, London, UK, May 17, 2012
- Downtown Art Walk – Art Battles, Los Angeles, CA. May 10, 2012
- Guerilla One Cahuenga Corridor, Hollywood, CA May 6, 2012
- Communities in Schools, School Life, Bel Air, CA. May 1, 2012
- New Urban Voices, Maximillian Gallery, West Hollywood, March 31, 2012
- Venice Art Walk & Auctions / Surf & Skate Boardriders Quiksilver, Venice, CA. April 27, 2012
- Red Bull Curates: The Road to Art Basel, Los Angeles, CA. April 5, 2012
- Vinyl Revisionists, Warner Bros. Records, Burbank, CA. March 30, 2012
- There & Back, Siren Studios Rooftop Sessions, Los Angeles, CA. March 1, 2012
- Matter of Time, Gallery Brown, Los Angeles, CA. October 20, 2012

=== 2013 ===
- 15th Annual Postcards from the Edge, Visual AIDS, New York City, January 25, 2013
- Ascending Human, Ethos Gallery, Los Angeles, January 10, 2013
- LA Art Show, Art of Elysium, January 23, 2013
- One Night Stand, The Arts Fund, San Francisco, CA, January 25, 2013
- Pieces of Heaven, The Art of Elysium and Christie's Auction House, Ace Museum, LA, February 20, 2013
- Sound of the Streets, Warner Bros. Records, LA, March 1, 2013
- G.I. Joe Tribute Show, The Loyal Subjects, LA, March 23, 2013
- Tarot: Art of Fortune, Modern Eden Gallery, San Francisco, March 16, 2013
- Kissing Lying Crying, AV, Los Angeles, March 29, 2013
- Sound of the Streets pt. II, Hot Rod LA, April 6, 2013
- Between Paint and Light, 2wenty x Gregory, Loakl Gallery, Oakland, CA, May 3, 2013
- American All Star, Gallery Brown, LA, May 18, 2013
- The Little Things, Ethos Gallery, LA, May 10, 2013
- Venice Family Clinic Print Pop Collection, Google HQ, Venice, CA, May 19, 2013
- Vans Custom Culture, The Whitney Museum of American Art, New York City, June 11, 2013
- Fast Weekend, The StadiumRed Estate, The Hamptons, NY, June 15, 2013
- Word Play, Design Matters, LA, June 29, 2013
- Melrose Art Ride, Ethos Gallery, LA, July 14, 2013
- San Diego Comic Con, Wired Magazine x Kia, July 18, 2013
- Let it Fly Project, Burbank CA, August 3, 2013
- Sunset Strip Music Festival, Ethos Gallery, Hollywood CA August 3, 2013
- Art Battles LA, Exchange LA, August 8, 2013
- Lady Shark Week, Burgundy Room, Hollywood CA, August 9, 2013
- Survive Anything, Exchange Alley, NYC, August 15, 2013
- M.O.M. Made of Memories, KGB Gallery, LA, August 10, 2013
- The Lost Warhols Collection, Karen Bystedt, Teddy's Lounge, The Roosevelt, September 12, 2013
- SICKY Art in the Lot, FameYard, LA, September 14, 2013
- The 5th Element, Guerilla One x Gallery 446, Palm Springs, CA September 28, 2013

=== 2014 ===
- The Art of Elysium's Pieces of Heaven Gala, Chalkboard, Siren Studios, February 2014
- LA Art Show – Lawrence Cantor Fine Art Booth, Andy Warhol series, 2014
- The Loyal Subjects x Toy Tokyo, Optimus Prime group show, February 2014
- Gibson Guitartown on the Sunset Strip Charity Auction, February 2014
- ONE LOVE, Woven Accents, Los Angeles, February 14, 2014
- Gregory Siff – Bodice, Venice Family Clinic, Venice Art Walk, 2014
- Steer Ahead- Group Show, Soze Gallery, April 2014

=== 2015 ===
- The Dean Collection, Swizz Beatz, No Commission, Miami Beach, Art Basel
- The Art of Elysium Pieces of Heaven, Christie's, MAMA Gallery, Los Angeles
- Marc Jacobs, Hotel Studio Book by Louisxxx and Gregory.
- Mercedes Benz Evolution Tour (live mural), Los Angeles
- Venice Family Clinic Auction, Los Angeles
- New York Fashion Week SS16
- Freedom, Pharrell Music Video

=== 2016 ===
- Portrait of an American Ice Cream Man, Mercedes-Benz & 4AM, DTLA
- High Fashion Something, Surf Lodge at W South Beach, Mercedes-Benz x DSTLD x 4 am
- Punks, Poets and Provocateurs, The Barn, Gruin Gallery South Hampton, NY
- Hetrick-Martin Institute, South Hampton, NY
- MCA Day, Group Tribute to Beastie Boy, Adam Yauch, Brooklyn, NY
- Selections of Portrait of an American Ice Cream Man, Gallery Valentine, East Hampton, NY
- The Art of Elysium Pieces of Heaven, Siren Studios Highland, Los Angeles

=== 2017 ===
- Museum at Fashion Institute of Technology, Pyer Moss #blacklivesmatter, New York City
- Happiness Dealer, Samuel Owen Gallery, Nantucket, MA
- From Canvas to Catwalk, Breakfast with Gregory Siff, Soho House, New York City
- The Art of Elysium 20th Anniversary Auction and Sotheby's Panel, Los Angeles, CA
- Avenue Los Angeles, Installation "All These James Deans" Hollywood, CA
- University of Southern California Fashion + Social Media Panel and Mural, USC Annenberg Center, CA
