= Munchkin (disambiguation) =

Munchkins are characters in the book The Wonderful Wizard of Oz.

Munchkin(s) may also refer to:

- Munchkin cat, a breed of cat characterized by its unusually short legs
- Munchkins, a brand of donut hole sold by Dunkin' Donuts
- Munchkin (company), a manufacturer of baby and toddler supplies.
- "Munchkins", an episode of the television series The Americans

== Gaming ==
- Munchkin (card game), a card game by Steve Jackson Games
- Munchkin (role-playing games), a player who plays a non-competitive game in a competitive manner
- Munchkin (video game) or K.C. Munchkin!, a cartridge for the Philips Videopac/Magnavox Odyssey^{2} video game console
