= Dukes of Melrose =

- Christos Garkinos (left) and Cameron Silver
- Genre: Reality
- Starring: Cameron Silver; Christos Garkinos
- Country of origin: United States
- No. of seasons: 1
- No. of episodes: 12

Production
- Executive producers: Glenda Hersh; Kathryn Vaughan; Lauren Eskelin; Noah Samton; Steven Weinstock
- Running time: 20–23 minutes
- Production company: True Entertainment

Original release
- Network: Bravo
- Release: March 6 – May 8, 2013

Dukes of Melrose is an American reality television series on Bravo and premiered on March 6, 2013. The series chronicles the daily operations at the couture store, Decades. The boutique is owned by Christos Garkinos and Cameron Silver, who are known for their vintage and glamorous clothing.

== Episodes ==
No.	Title	Original release date	U.S. viewers (millions)
1	"One Dress, Ten Thousand Dollars!"	March 6, 2013	0.61
The Oscars are coming up and the staff at Decades work to dress various celebrities. Rachael Harris stops by the store.
2	"Oscar Season"	March 13, 2013	0.52
Cameron works with the design team to create a lavish vintage-inspired dress for Melissa McCarthy. Meanwhile, Christos goes out to look for gowns in order to fulfill the last minute rush and find the perfect dress for his close friend, Garcelle Beauvais.
3	"Shoes, Shoes, Everywhere Shoes!"	March 20, 2013	0.56
Christos rushes to hire a manager before the annual Decades shoe sale. Cameron and Christos end up clashing when the crowds line up and around the block and big problems are inevitable.
4	"A Bunch of Biba"	March 27, 2013	0.42
Christos is on a mission to find the perfect wedding dress for Ashley Madekwe. Back at the store, the manager search is still ongoing until Cameron discovers a possible solution. Cameron and Christos test their potential manager during a celebrity party which features their new vintage Biba line.
5	"Not Cheap, Chic"	April 3, 2013	0.45
Cameron flies to New York City to shop for new inventory at an acclaimed vintage mart. Despite Christos giving Cameron a budget, Cameron would rather find hidden gems instead of sticking to the budget. Christos visits Monet Mazur's closet to look for some elegant pieces for the store.
6	"Art in a Jumpsuit"	April 10, 2013	0.44
Cameron is asked to oversee an exhibit of Rudi Gernreich's work located at the Museum of Contemporary Art and dress actress Michele Hicks in one of the designer's pieces. Decades employee and Camera get into an intense verbal altercation due to a minor mishap. Christos works to restore the peace.
7	"Dita, Jody and Gaultier"	April 17, 2013	0.48
Cameron invades Dita Von Teese's but Dita isn't too keen on letting her items go. Christos, Cameron and the Decades crew take a trip to San Francisco for an event featuring their vintage collection of Jean Paul Gaultier. Jody Watley makes a surprise visit.
8	"I Need Paris"	April 24, 2013	0.56
Cameron flies out to Paris in order to acquire the world's best vintage couture at flea markets and high-priced auctions. Back at Decades, Christos is worried that Cameron will go over the budget. Later, Cameron gets some outfits together for Max Greenfield.
9	"This One Is a Shaved Beaver"	May 1, 2013	0.55
Christos' family comes to Los Angeles for Greek Easter and assists him in preparing for his annual Easter feast. Cameron is left to run the store by himself, which leads to a mountain of stress. Later, Cameron visits Phyllis Diller to hopes to receive new pieces for the store.
10	"Homo Say What?"	May 1, 2013	0.55
Cameron has been chosen as a honoree for The Heaven Gala. While preparing for the Gala, he also has the added pressure of composing a fashion show for the event, attempting to raise a million dollars for charity and dressing Eva Amuri. During all the chaos, Christos and Cameron receive shocking news regarding a dress they purchased for $10,000.
11	"NYC Pop"	May 8, 2013	0.34
12	"Enjoy Spending Money!"	May 8, 2013	0.40
