= Gabrielle Demeestere =

French filmmaker based in New York City

Gabrielle Demeestere is a French filmmaker based in New York City.

== Film career ==
Demeestere attended New York University's MFA Film Program. While there she collaborated with James Franco and eleven other student filmmakers to co-direct The Color of Time, a film on the life of poet C.K. Williams that starred Franco, Mila Kunis and Jessica Chastain. The film premiered at the 2012 Rome Film Festival.

After working with Franco on The Color of Time he approached her about adapting two of his short stories from his collection A California Childhood. Demeestere adapted them into her thesis film Yosemite which premiered as the closing film at the 2015 Slamdance Film Festival. The film was later released in January 2016.

== Filmography ==
- The Color of Time (2012)
- Yosemite (2015)
