= Kota the triceratops =

Animatronic toy dinosaur

Kota the Triceratops was an animatronic toy dinosaur made by Hasbro and Playskool. It is modeled after a Triceratops, and intended for children aged 3 to 6.

The toy debuted at Toy Fair New York in February 2008, building on the reception of Ugobe's earlier Pleo robotic dinosaur toy, and went on sale in October 2008 for approximately US$300 as listed by the company website. A review by IEEE Spectrum indicated that it had 11 sensors over its body to sense touch and pressure, and made appropriate noises (like roars) or movements (like tail-wagging) in response. It had some functionality to accept a folded "leaf" food, and move its jaw and make appropriate chomping noises.
