= Glo Worm =

Line of stuffed toys introduced in 1982

- The original Glo Worm, released in 1982, was the same shape until 2005
- Type: Stuffed toy
- Company: Hasbro; Playskool
- Country: United States
- Availability: 1982–present

Glo Worm is a stuffed toy for young children, designed by Hasbro's Playskool division, and made in Pawtucket, Rhode Island. Introduced in 1982, the plush, pajamaed worm body contained a battery-powered device that when squeezed would light up the toy's vinyl head from within, creating a soft glow.

The original toy, upon release, was such a success that Hasbro released a new Musical Glo Worm and Glo Bug in 1984, and a Glo Butterfly in 1985. A series of story books, night lights, videos and other merchandise was also produced until the early 1990s. However, in late 2005, the product was criticized for harming children; its plastic head was softened with phthalates, which can be dangerous if swallowed by children. The Glo Worm is still made today, although with an updated appearance.

== Glo Friends ==
Playskool expanded its brand of "Glo" toys made of soft vinyl that glowed, and released The Glo Friends animated series in 1986.

American fast food chain Wendy's released a series of Glo Friends soft vinyl toys as a promotion in 1989.

In collaboration with Playskool, toy company PlayMonster expanded the Glo Friends with Wigglebug in 2022.
