= The Glo Friends =

American television series

- Genre: Fantasy; Comedy
- Voices of: Charlie Adler; Roger C. Carmel; Nancy Cartwright; Pat Fraley; Mona Marshall; Don Messick; Hal Rayle; Susan Silo; Russi Taylor; Frank Welker; Katie Leigh
- Composer: Robert J. Walsh
- Country of origin: United States
- Original language: English
- No. of series: 1
- No. of episodes: 26 (+1 special)

Production
- Production companies: Hasbro; Sunbow Productions; Marvel Productions; Toei Animation

Original release
- Network: Syndication
- Release: September 23, 1986 – March 17, 1987

The Glo Friends is an American animated television series that originally aired in 1986 as a segment of My Little Pony 'n Friends. Produced by Sunbow Productions and Marvel Productions in collaboration with Toei Animation, the 26 segments of Glo Friends played in rotation as a secondary series, alternating with MoonDreamers and Potato Head Kids. Glow Friends was later broadcast on the CBN Family Channel from 1989 to 1995 as part of the My Little Pony rebroadcast.

The television series was preceded by the Glo Friends toyline: small glow-in-the-dark toys in the shape of insects and other small creatures. The toys were adapted from the original Glo Worm introduced in 1982 by the Playskool division of Hasbro. A line of books from Ladybird Books were published to accompany each Glo Friend.

== Premise ==
The title protagonists in The Glo Friends are a community of small, glow-in-the-dark bugs that live in Glo Land, a magical kingdom located in the middle of a forest. Their homes are built near the Glo Pond, where the Friends harvest a substance known as Moondrops, which enables their ability to glow in the dark.

The peaceful existence of the Friends is constantly threatened by the Moligans, a group of mole-like creatures led by Starnose. The Moligans were banished from the kingdom of Moleslavia for various crimes including unlawful digging, robbery, and cheating. Since their banishment, the Moligans have been living underground and plotting revenge. The short-sighted Moligans endeavor to kidnap the Glo Friends in order to light the dark tunnels of their mining operations, and thereby extracting more gold.

== Characters ==
=== Glo Friends ===
- Baby Glo Worm (voiced by Nancy Cartwright) is the youngest member of the Glo Friends community. She is seen spending most of her time along Glo Grannybug. She is quite curious and often giggles. She also speaks, but only in short sentences. In the debut episode of the Glo Friends TV show "Baby Glo Worm goes Bye-Bye", she escaped from her bed while the other Glo Friends were trying to sing a lullaby to make her sleep, and consequently got lost in the Moligans´ Tunnels, putting the other Glo Friends into trouble when they set off to find her.
- Garden Ant spends his time taking care of his plants and flowers. He cultivates vegetables for the Glo Friend community, and has a vast knowledge about them. He cannot tolerate seeing the Moligans eating the roots of a tree, as seen in the episodes "Forest Brigade" (in which he protects his personal tree) and even in "Easy Money" Pt. 2 when a Moleslavian villager is selling "Root dogs" (like Hot Dogs with roots instead of sausages). He is a regular character in the TV series. His house is a sort of pumpkin located in Glo Land.
  - Bunny Rabbit is Garden Ant's best friend.
- Glo Bashfulbug is a female Glo Friend that does not know what to say in certain moments. Sometimes, she shows an attraction for Glo Worm, one of the bravest and smartest Glo Friends. In more than one moment, she said to Glo Worm that being brave is hard. She is a regular character in the TV series.
- Glo Bedbug is the laziest of the Glo Friends. The only things she usually wants to do is eating, singing, and sleeping, but sometimes, she plays.
- Glo Bonnie Beetle is another female Glo Friend. According to her description, she is very sweet. She does not appear in the TV series.
- Glo Bookbug -
- Glo Bopbug is an eight-legged Glo Friend that wears a top hat and shoes, and uses a cane. He is a regular character in the TV series. He likes to dance. In the Spanish dub of the show, he was called "Abuelete", literally translated as "Granddaddy".
- Glo Butterfly carries a magic wand. She believes that she can do magic tricks, although she actually cannot. In the episode "Make no mistake, it's magic", the other Glo Friends said that it is better not to tell her that her "magic tricks" are just coincidences, in order to keep her happy.
- Glo Bug (voiced by Charlie Adler) is sometimes considered the bravest of the Glo Friends. He is not afraid of danger. For example, in the first part of "The Quest", he cannot tolerate that Rook and the Red Ant army are destroying the forest and for that reason, without wasting time thinking, he dares to run into Rook and face him. For some reason, in the TV series and in his Playskool-Hasbro figure, his hat is pink, while in other media, such as the Ladybird books, his hat has multicoloured strips.
- Glo Cappy (voiced by Russi Taylor) loves going to explore the forests riding on Country Mouse and acts as a reporter of Glo Land. He informs the others about the dangers or anything worth to mention. He and his friend wear a blue cap.
  - Country Mouse is Glo Cappy's best friend.
- Glo Clutterbug is a clumsy insect that usually messes up the situation, and puts the other Glo Friends into trouble. He often falls into traps.
- Glo Cricket -
- Glo Doodlebug (voiced by Will Ryan) loves art, but often gets frustrated when he feels that his artworks or his painting style are not appreciated. In the episode "The Masterpiece", Glo Doodlebug decides to leave Glo Land in order to go to a cave (accompanied by Snugbug) that he uses as a personal studio. He is a regular character in the TV series.
- Glo Firefly has a name that has double-meaning: his job is being a firefighter and he is a firefly. He does not appear in the TV series.
- Glo Flutterbug was only available through mail order as Glo Prayerbug. He does not appear in the TV series.
- Glo Frog (voiced by Frank Welker) is a mysterious old frog that speaks in riddles and has the ability to teleport. Most of the times, the other Glo Friends do not understand what he is talking about, until they solve the riddle he gives them.
- Glo Grannybug is the wisest and oldest Glo Friend. She lives in the biggest treehouse of Glo Land. She often tells stories to the other Glo Friends and she is often seen taking care of Baby Glo Worm. She also loves celebrating parties with homemade food at the Full Moon Days, in which Moondrops falls to the Earth, as seen for examples in the episode "Beware the Tales of Gold"
- Glo Hopper is a green-bodied grasshopper who is usually seen riding on Glo Turtle. He tends to jump high under several circumstances, including surprise, happiness, etc.
  - Glo Turtle is Glo Hopper's best friend.
- Glo Horsefly -
- Glo Nuttybug -
- Glo Prayerbug is a blue mantis-shaped Glo Friend that, as her name indicates, prays when something goes wrong. She appeared a few times in the TV show (only in the 10-part adventure "The Quest" and in "The Glo Friends save Christmas" special) and she had only a few lines. Her toy figure was only available in the US and Canada by mail order.
- Glo Scuttlebug (voiced by Mona Marshall) is a skypilot that rides on Dragonflyer. He is a regular character in the TV series.
  - Dragonflyer is a dragonfly who is Glo Shuttlebug's best friend that acts as a plane.
- Glo Skunkbug is a stinking Glo Friend with purple nose (most of the other Glo Friends have a red nose). He is a very close friend of Glo Clutterbug.
- Glo Sluggerbug (voiced by Frank Welker) wears a baseball cap and always carry a stick. He is very brave and in several moments he and his frog friend have excellent ideas when fighting against their enemies. He is a regular character in the TV series. The only moment in which he was seen playing a baseball match with the other Glo Friends was in the episode "Bean Ball".
  - Bullyfrog (voiced by Frank Welker) is a bullfrog who is Glo Sluggerbug's best friend.
- Glo Snail (voiced by Don Messick) -
- Glo Sniffles Snail has a constant cold and he does not appear in the TV series.
- Glo Snugbug is a pink caterpillar-shaped Glo Friend. She is not a regular character in the TV series. She only appeared during the 10-part episode "The Quest" and "The Masterpiece", in which she seemed to show feelings for Glo Doodlebug. She tends to hug all his friends.
- Glo Spider -
- Glo Tootlebug -
- Glo Waterbug is a sailor insect. He guards the Glo Moondrops Pond with Dipper Duck.
  - Dipper Ducky (voiced by Charlie Adler) is a duck who is Glo Waterbug's best friend. He guards Glo Moondrops Pond with Dipper Duck.
- Glo Worm (voiced by Pat Fraley) is the original Glo Friend and is the unofficial leader of the Glo Friends in the TV series. He is quite brave and smart. He wears purple pyjamas, although the original Glo Worm toy portrays him as wearing green pyjamas. This was a source of some controversy.

=== Glo Wees ===
A race of fairies that can glow like the Glo Friends. They are known to be nature's helpers:

- Dapple -
- Nippin -
- Nutcap (voiced by Hal Rayle) is a Glo Wee that carries around the Book of Nature which enables him to communicate with nature.
- Posey (voiced by Nancy Cartwright) -
- Spruce is a Glo Wee who is an expert juggler.
- Willow is a Glo Wee who conducts the symphony of nature.

=== Villains ===
- Moligans are the primary antagonists of the series. After being banished from Moleslavia for their crimes, they sought to start their mine and mine for gold in order to get enough to buy out Moleslavia. To accomplish this, they always try to target the Glo Friends to power their lanterns with no success.
  - Starnose (voiced by Roger C. Carmel) is the leader of the Moligans. He is physically tough and it is mentioned that he is able to scare anyone who tries to ignore his orders. In the Spanish dub of the Glo Friends TV Show, he was called "Narizotas", literally translated as "Big Nose".
  - Nails (voiced by Susan Silo) is a selfish and egocentrical Moligan lady that only worries about her physical appearance or anything in her own benefit. She likes valuable and shining body complements (such as rings, necklaces, earrings, bracelets, etc.) and she does not tolerate that anyone calls her an "ugly witch" (or similar attributions). She seems to have an attraction to Starnose, and can often be seen clinging to him, but that may just be her trying to get close to the main power of the group. She also serves as the cook of the Moligans as seen in "Wizard of Rook".
  - Old Moldy (voiced by Roger C. Carmel) is the oldest Moligan in the group. He needs to use a hammer-shape cane due to his old age and has seen a lot of things in his youth. Since he was young, his main dream was to melt a piece of gold to turn it in a huge river of gold. In the episode "Caverns of Mystery", his old mine was seen.
  - Excavator (voiced by Charlie Adler) is the second oldest Moligan in the group. He is a scientist that usually remains in his personal laboratory doing chemical experiments or inventing new mining artifacts such as the Bi-Pedal Turbo Tunneler (seen in two episodes of the TV show). In the Spanish dub of the TV series, he was called "Inventor".
  - Brasher (voiced by Hal Rayle) is a tall and intellectual Moligan. It is said that he has the best ideas about how to get the gold and the Glo Friends, but Starnose hears and takes them as they were of his own to consider himself as the "main brain of the Moligans".
  - Smasher (voiced by Charlie Adler) is Brasher's brother. Unlike Brasher, Smasher is (or acts as) stupid and dumb. Physically, he is tall and tough. He feels the need of "smashing" at least one Glo Friend (during the 10-part episode "The Quest", he is seen several times trying to damage the Glo Friends in order to force them to work for the Moligans).
  - Scoop (voiced by Nancy Cartwright) is the youngest Moligan. She is also the only nice Moligan, often secretly sabotaging Starnose's plots, and is friends with the Glo Friends, but fears to leave the Moligans. She wears tight clothing and has a tall auburn hairdo and a braided ponytail.
  - Tumbler is the shortest Moligan. He is also lazy, doing as little digging as possible, and is very gullible, often taking throwaway comments at face value.
- Rook (voiced by Hal Rayle) is a crow who used to work for Lord Driver of the Red Ant Army. After Driver left, the Moligans enlisted Rook as a spy and lookout. He has little love for his employers, once even dishing out the dirt on them to the Glo Friends newspaper.
- The Red Ant Army are a group of insects in a desert valley and Rook's former employers, led by Lord Driver (voiced by Frank Welker). They only appeared in "The Quest" in which they captured the Moligans and Glo Friends. It was because of them that the Moligans learned of the Glo Friends and their illumination abilities. Due to a breakout of the Moligans and the Glo Friends, Lord Driver and the Red Ant Army took flight when their kingdom ended up having a cave-in.
- Blanche (voiced by Sally Struthers) is the Wicked Witch of the North Pole. Dressed in purple fur, she appears on the Christmas special along with her live weasel furry scarf (voiced by Charlie Adler) and had an icicle wand. She trapped Santa Claus and his DearDeers (reindeer) in an ice cage in a plot to stop Christmas.

== Episodes ==
No.	Title	Directed by	Written by	Original release date
SP	"The Glo Friends Save Christmas"	Terry Lennon	George Arthur Bloom	1985
An evil witch called Blanche kidnaps Santa Claus and traps him in a cage of ice, so that presents cannot be delivered to the residents of Glo Land and around the world. The Glo Friends go on a quest to rescue Santa.
1	"The Quest (episodes 1-10)"	Unknown	George Arthur Bloom	September 23, 1986
2	"The Quest (episodes 1-10)"	Unknown	George Arthur Bloom	September 30, 1986
3	"The Quest (episodes 1-10)"	Unknown	George Arthur Bloom	October 7, 1986
4	"The Quest (episodes 1-10)"	Unknown	George Arthur Bloom	October 14, 1986
5	"The Quest (episodes 1-10)"	Unknown	George Arthur Bloom	October 21, 1986
6	"The Quest (episodes 1-10)"	Unknown	George Arthur Bloom	October 28, 1986
7	"The Quest (episodes 1-10)"	Unknown	George Arthur Bloom	November 4, 1986
8	"The Quest (episodes 1-10)"	Unknown	George Arthur Bloom	November 11, 1986
9	"The Quest (episodes 1-10)"	Unknown	George Arthur Bloom	November 18, 1986
10	"The Quest (episodes 1-10)"	Unknown	George Arthur Bloom	November 25, 1986
Glo Moon Drop Pond, the lifeblood of the Glo Friends springs a leak, and Glo Worm, Garden Ant, and their friends go on a dangerous quest to search for Moon Drops.
11	"Baby Glo Worm Goes Bye-Bye"	Unknown	Douglas Booth	December 2, 1986
Baby Glo Worm runs off when she is supposed to be napping and ends up in the Moligan's hideout. Glo Worm and the others search for Baby Glo Worm but get trapped by the Moligans in the process.
12	"Two of a Kind"	Scott Jeralds (storyboard artist)	Douglas Booth	December 9, 1986
Bashful Bug runs off after being teased by Glo Worm during a dance. Scoop also runs away as well after wrecking one of the Moligan's tunnels. The two outcasts then meet and form an unlikely friendship.
13	"Make No Mistake, It's Magic"	Unknown	Douglas Booth	December 16, 1986
A series of coincidences in a berry patch make Glo Butterfly believe that her wand really has magical properties, but Bed Bug, Bop Bug, and Glo Spider know that is not really a magic and attempt to prove this to other Glo Friends.
14	"The Forest Brigade"	Unknown	Douglas Booth	December 23, 1986
The Moligans feast on the roots of a tree that Garden Ant planted, and Garden Ant attempts to save the tree before it dies.
15	"Caverns of Mystery"	Unknown	Douglas Booth	December 30, 1986
Glo Cricket runs out of stories to tell the other Glo Friends and decides to search for the legendary Glo Drop Moon Lake. He fails to find it, and lies about it when he gets back.
16	"Front Page"	Unknown	Douglas Booth	January 6, 1987
The Moligans decide to get interviewed for the Glo Land Times newspaper to improve their reputations, but things do not go according to plan.
17	"Bean Ball"	Unknown	Dale Hale	January 13, 1987
18	"The Masterpiece"	Unknown	Diane Duane	January 20, 1987
Doodle Bug feels that no one in Glo Land understands his art, and so goes off to work in private with Snug Bug.
19	"Beware Tales of Gold That Lead to Thorny Trails"	Unknown	Craig Rand	January 27, 1987
20	"Glo Friends Meet the Glo Wees (Episodes 1-4)"	Unknown	George Arthur Bloom	February 3, 1987
21	"Glo Friends Meet the Glo Wees (Episodes 1-4)"	Unknown	George Arthur Bloom	February 10, 1987
22	"Glo Friends Meet the Glo Wees (Episodes 1-4)"	Unknown	George Arthur Bloom	February 17, 1987
23	"Glo Friends Meet the Glo Wees (Episodes 1-4)"	Unknown	George Arthur Bloom	February 24, 1987
The Moligan's latest plan brings two races of Glo Land bug together, the Glo Friends and the Glo Wees. They form a partnership and work to defeat the Moligans and destroy a storm that will kill the Glo Wees.
24	"Easy Money (episodes 1-2)"	Unknown	Douglas Booth	March 3, 1987
25	"Easy Money (episodes 1-2)"	Unknown	Douglas Booth	March 10, 1987
The Moligans think they have discovered a way to use the Glofriends' dewdrops and moondrops to transform common rock into gold. Little do they know is that they are destined for a rocky future.
26	"Wizard of Rook"	Unknown	Douglas Booth	March 17, 1987

=== Special ===
The 1985 television special The Glo Friends Save Christmas aired prior to the regular series. The plotline follows the Glo Friends rescuing Santa Claus and his reindeer from Blanche, the wicked witch of the north pole. With the help of a moose that had been rejected as one of Santa's reindeer, the Glo Friends save Santa Claus and defeat Blanche.

== Cast ==
- Charlie Adler - Excavator, Glo Bug, Dipper Duck, Smasher
- Joey Camen -
- Roger C. Carmel - Starnose, Old Moldy
- Nancy Cartwright - Scoop, Baby Glo Worm, Posey
- Townsend Coleman -
- Pat Fraley - Glo Worm
- Katie Leigh -
- Mona Marshall - Glo Scuttlebug
- Don Messick - Glo Snail
- Michael Mish -
- Lorenzo Music - Moose (in "Glo Friend Save Christmas")
- Carroll O'Connor - Santa Claus (in "Glo Friends Save Christmas")
- Patricia Parris -
- Hal Rayle - Rook, Brasher, Nutcap
- Will Ryan - Glo Doodlebug
- Susan Silo - Nails
- Sally Struthers - Blanche (in "Glo Friends Save Christmas")
- Russi Taylor - Glo Cappy
- Frank Welker - Glo Sluggerbug, Bully Frog, Lord Driver

== Crew ==
- Alan Dinehart - voice director
- Stu Rosen - voice director ("The Glo Friends Save Christmas" only)

== Alternate titles ==
- Bulgarian dub: Светулковците (Svetulkovtzite)
- Dutch dub: Twinkel Pinkel
- Finnish dub: "Keijukaiset ja mulikaanit"
- French dub: Les Luxioles
- German dub: Die Glimmerlinge
- Greek dub: Φωτεινούληδες (Fotinoulides)
- Hungarian dub: Ragyogiék; Villók
- Italian dub: Mille luci nel bosco / Gli amici dei sogni
- Polish version (English dub, Polish lector): Świetliki
- Spanish dub, in Spain: Los Gusiluz
- Swedish dub: Lyskompisarna och deras vänner
- Taiwan Mandarin dub: 發光一族 (Fa Guang I Tzu)
