= The Color of Time =

- Film poster
- Directed by: Edna Luise Biesold; Sarah-Violet Bliss; Gabrielle Demeestere; Alexis Gambis; Shruti Ganguly; Brooke Goldfinch; Shripriya Mahesh; Pamela Romanowsky; Bruce Thierry Cheung; Tine Thomasen; Virginia Urreiztieta; Omar Zúñiga Hidalgo
- Written by: Edna Luise Biesold; Sarah-Violet Bliss; Gabrielle Demeestere; Alexis Gambis; Shruti Ganguly; Brooke Goldfinch; Shripriya Mahesh; Pamela Romanowsky; Bruce Thierry Cheung; Tine Thomasen; Virginia Urreiztieta; Omar Zúñiga Hidalgo
- Produced by: Edward Bass; Shruti Ganguly; Vince Jolivette; Victorino Noval; James Franco; Miles Levy
- Starring: James Franco; Mila Kunis; Jessica Chastain; Zach Braff; Henry Hopper
- Cinematography: Pedro Gómez Millán; Bruce Thierry Cheung
- Edited by: Jennifer Ruff
- Music by: Garth Neustadter; Daniel Wohl
- Production company: Rabbit Bandini Productions
- Distributed by: Starz Digital Media
- Release dates: November 16, 2012 (Rome Film Festival); December 12, 2014 (US)
- Running time: 72 minutes
- Country: United States
- Language: English

The Color of Time (originally titled Tar) is a 2012 American independent biographical drama film written and directed by twelve New York University film students whose teacher was James Franco. The film stars Franco (who also produced), Bruce Campbell, Mila Kunis, Jessica Chastain, Zach Braff, and Henry Hopper.

It premiered on November 16, 2012 at the Rome Film Festival. The film was theatrically released in the United Kingdom on September 8, 2014, under the title Forever Love. It was theatrically released in the United States on December 12, 2014.

== Plot ==
The different parts of Pulitzer Prize winner C.K. Williams' life told through his poems. Flashbacks of his childhood, his teens, college years, to when he meets and marries his wife, Catherine (Kunis) and the birth of his children and parenthood. The film is narrated by different versions of Williams (Franco, Hopper, March, Unger), depicting the different aspects of Williams through the years.

== Cast ==
- James Franco as C.K. Williams – age 40
- Mila Kunis as Catherine
- Jessica Chastain as Mrs. Williams
- Zach Braff as Albert
- Henry Hopper as C.K. Williams at a young age
- Bruce Campbell as Goody
- Vince Jolivette as Mr. Williams
- Jordan March as C.K. Williams in youth
- Zachary Unger as C.K. Williams – age 7
- Danika Yarosh as Irene
- Mia Serafino as Sarah
- Giavani Cairo as Dan
- Kathi J. Moore as Phyllis
- Ziam Penn as Ron
- Joshua Saba as John

== Reception ==
On review aggregator Rotten Tomatoes, the film holds an approval rating of 5% based on 21 reviews, with an average rating of 3.70/10. Metacritic gives the film a weighted average score of 34 out of 100, based on 12 critics, indicating "generally unfavorable reviews".

== Accolades ==
- 2012 Rome Film Festival:
  - CinemaXXI Award (nomination) – Edna Luise Biesold, Sarah-Violet Bliss, Gabrielle Demeestere, Alexis Gambis, Shruti Ganguly, Brooke Goldfinch, Shripriya Mahesh, Pamela Romanowsky, Bruce Thierry Cheung, Tine Thomasen, Virginia Urreiztieta and Omar Zúñiga Hidalgo

- Cubovision Prize (win) – James Franco
