= Alphie =

Educational robotic toy

- Company: Hasbro
- Country: United States
- Availability: 1978–present
- Materials: plastic

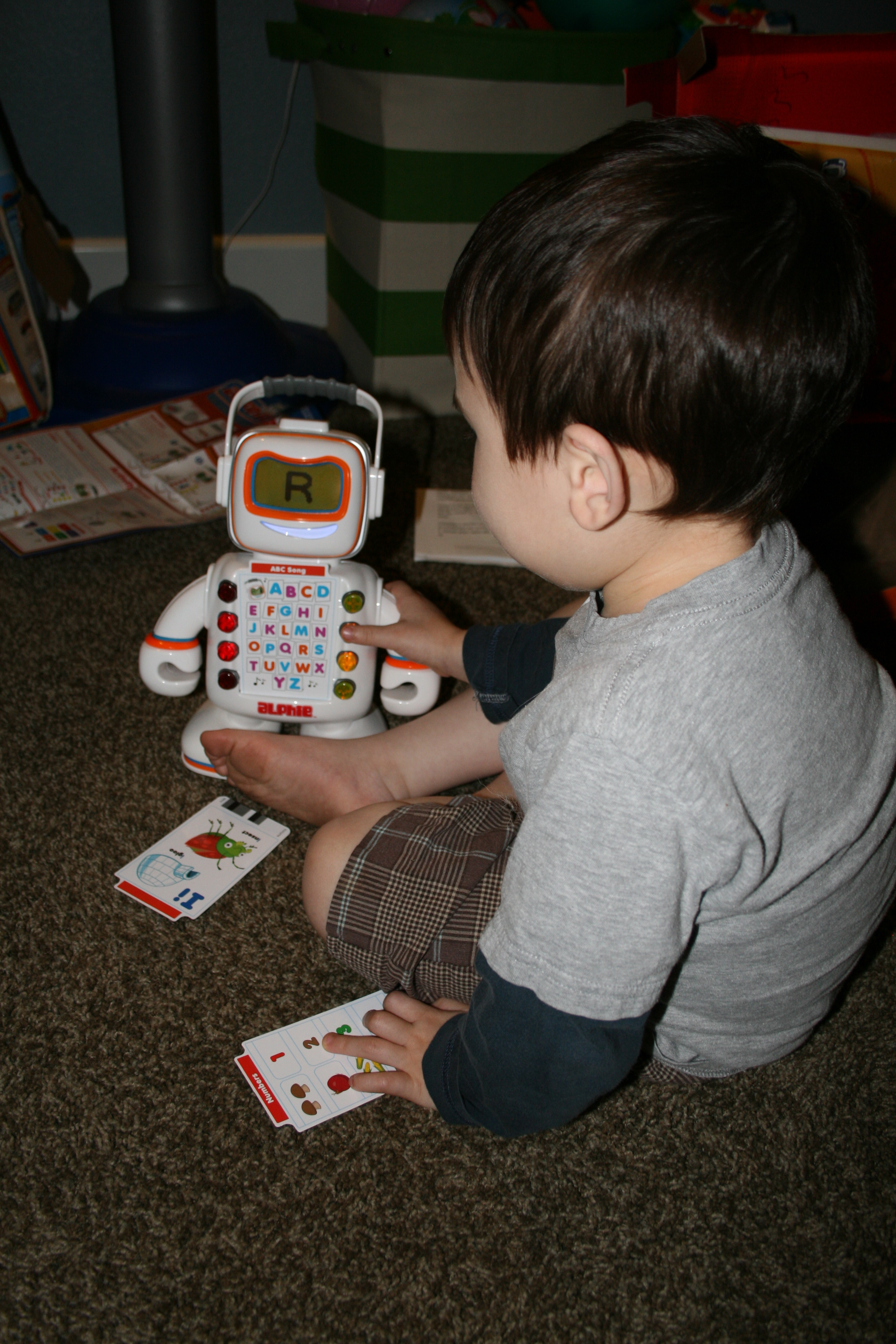
Kid playing with Alphie

Alphie was an educational robot toy popular in the 1980s. It featured a slot in the front for interchangeable cards, which lined up with special soft-touch input function buttons built into the front of the toy. It ran on batteries and came with different insert cards to help children learn math, spelling, matching skills, etc. The toy also played music.

The original Alphie was released in 1978. Alphie II was released in 1983.

Reviews for the Alphie range from calling the Alphie "highly educational" to saying Alphie "scares [their] child".

Alphie 2

"Talking Alphie" was billed as "the talking alphabet machine, the electronic friend, [that] teaches basic learning skills" and "makes learning fun, with a friendly voice that guides children through different activities." Kids could learn counting, matching, problem-solving, sequencing, and other skills as they played. Talking Alphie would respond to their answers with "happy words for right answers [and] encouraging words for wrong answers." The toy also played familiar melodies, and featured a smiling, light-up face.
