= Beau Dunn =

American actress

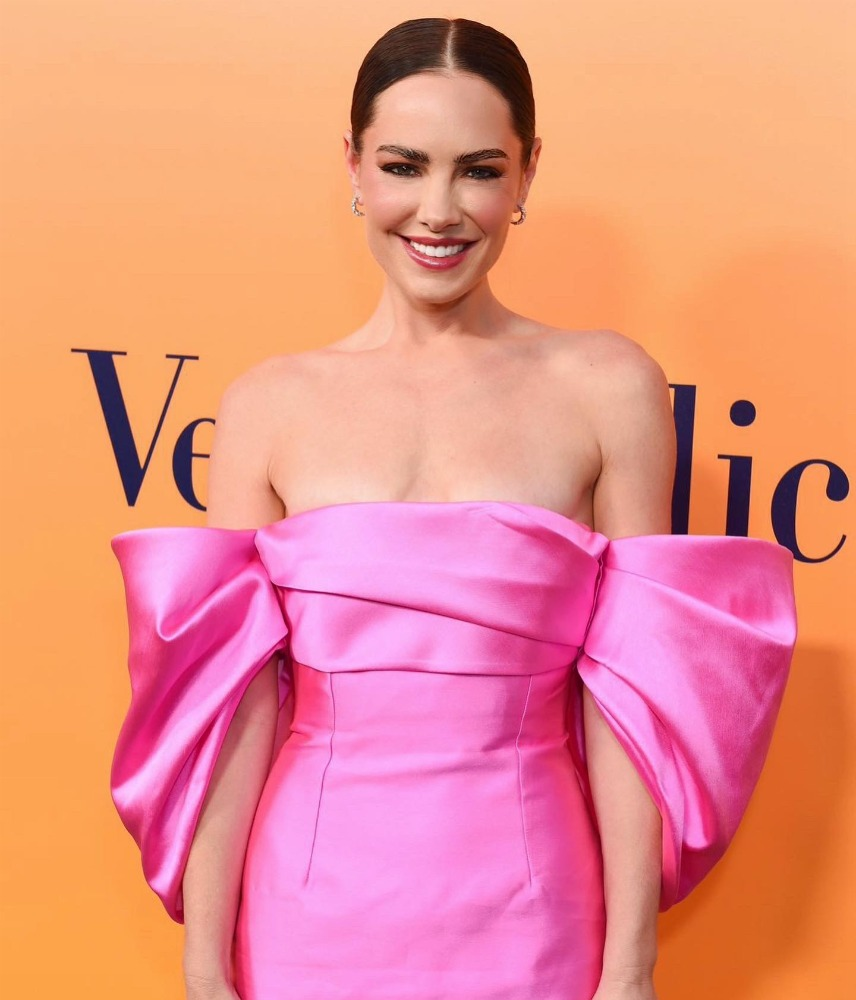
- Beau Dunn attending Veuve Clicquot celebrates 250th Anniversary with Solaire
- Born: Brittany Beau Dunn; June 10, 1987 (age 39); Los Angeles, California, US
- Occupations: Model; Actress; Visual artist; Designer; Entrepreneur
- Spouse(s): James Fay (2010-present, married 2017)
- Children: Bella Dunn Fay, Finn Dunn Fay
- Parent(s): Steven B Dunn (Father), Laura J. Dunn (Mother)
- Relatives: Steven W. Dunn (sibling), Michael Fay (father-in-law), Annabel Fay (sister-in-law)
- Modelling information
- Height: 5 ft 9 in (1.75 m)
- Hair colour: Brown
- Eye colour: Green
- Manager: PLASTIC - Los Angeles
- Website: www.beaudunn.com, www.beaudunnart.com

Beau Dunn (born Brittany Beau Dunn; June 10, 1987, in Los Angeles, California) is an American actress, model, visual artist and entrepreneur. based in Los Angeles, California. Dunn’s work consists primarily of mixed media works including neon, paint, photography and sculpture. Next to tackling social and autobiographical issues, Dunn speaks to the contemporary art tradition of using toys and the concept of play as a means to reflect societies’ stereotypes, tastes, and desires. She is best known for her series of Barbie portraits, titled "Plastic", in addition to her appearances in modeling campaigns for Smashbox Cosmetics and as well as her roles in American television series Entourage, Up All Night, CSI: Crime Scene Investigation and Melissa & Joey.

== Early life and education ==
Dunn was born in Los Angeles, California, the daughter of actress and model Laura Dunn and Steven B. Dunn, CEO of Munchkin, Inc. Dunn attended The Buckley School in Sherman Oaks, California, and received a Bachelor of Arts in studio art from Pepperdine University in Malibu, California, in 2010.

== Personal life ==
Since 2010, Dunn is in relationship with New Zealand born venture capitalist James Fay. James Fay is the son of New Zealand Merchant Banker and the founder of America's Cup Team New Zealand, Michael Fay. In 2011, her agent confirmed they engaged while in Cabo San Lucas, Mexico. Dunn and Fay married in the Maldives in April 2017 and returned to Los Angeles to celebrate their union and Beau's 30th Birthday at Dunn's family home in Beverly Hills on June 10, 2017. On May 4, 2022, Beau Dunn and James Fay announced expecting twins this summer via surrogate. On July 1, 2022, Dunn welcomed daughter Bella Dunn Fay and son Finn Dunn Fay.

== Career ==
=== Modeling and acting ===
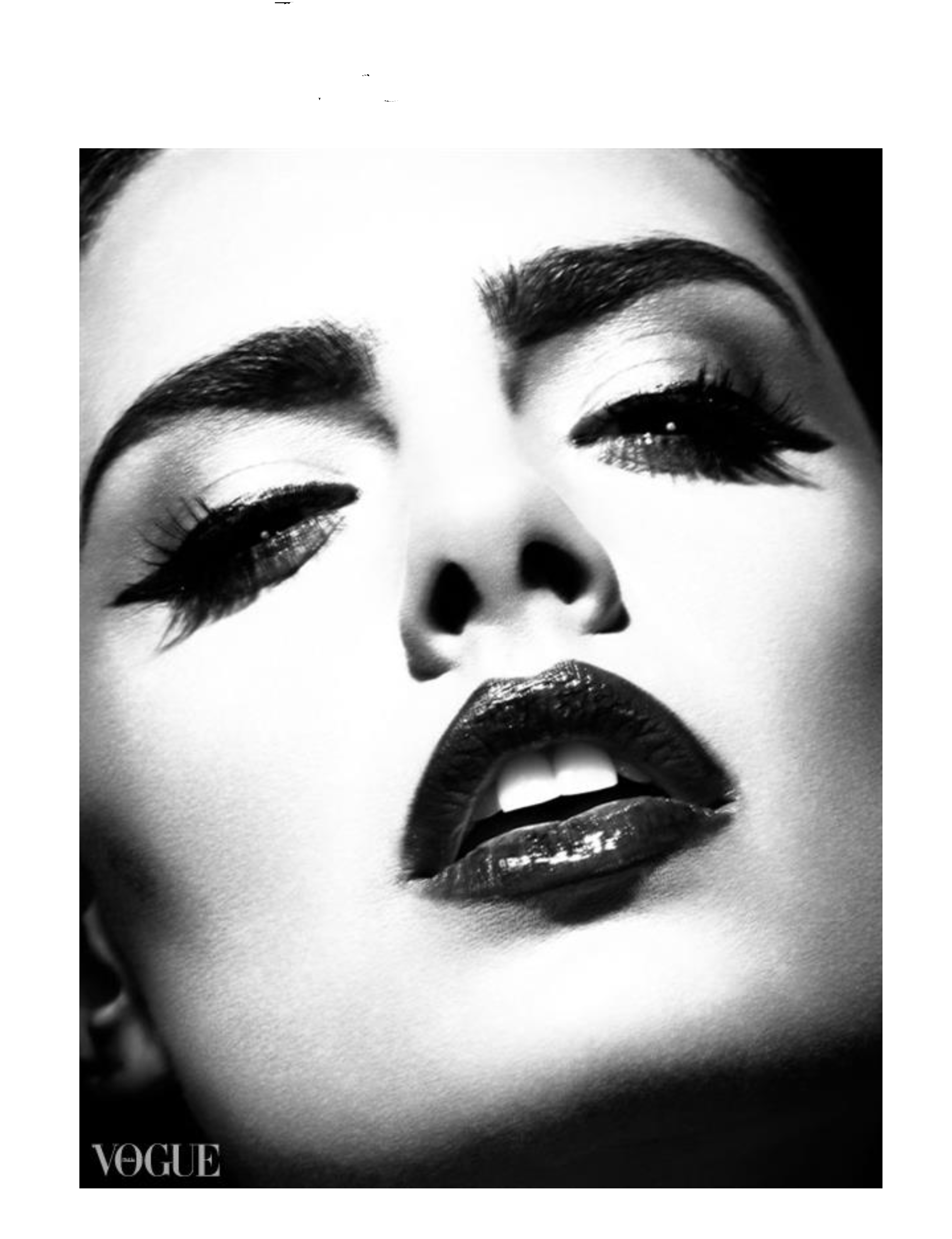
Beau Dunn in Vogue Italia, Shot by David Walden, 2012

At 18, Dunn was signed to the Ford Modeling Agency. She has appeared in Vogue Italia, C Magazine, Angeleno Magazine, Beverly Hills Lifestyle Magazine and Genlux Magazine.

After graduating from Pepperdine University in 2010, Dunn joined the television pilot Up All Night where she co-starred alongside Christina Applegate, Maya Rudolph and Will Arnett. She also starred in HBO's Entourage, CBS's CSI: Crime Scene Investigation, and ABC Family's Melissa & Joey. Dunn also featured in commercials for Head & Shoulders and Axe Body Spray.

=== Art ===
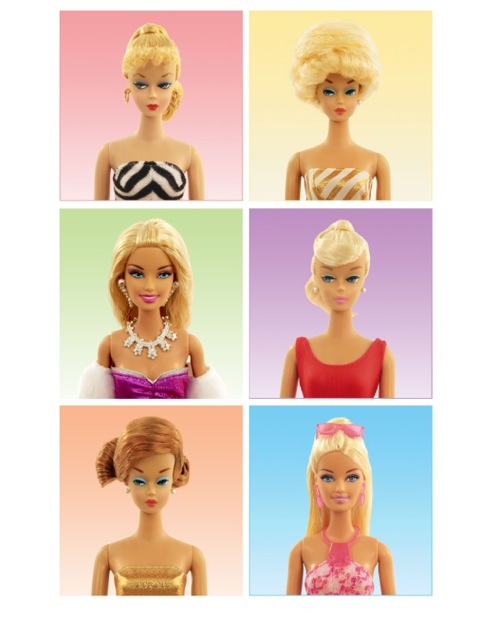
Barbie series, "Plastic," shot by Beau Dunn, 2012

Dunn is a contemporary visual artist, known for her photography, sculptures and paintings. Her series have included Barbie, Hello Kitty and gun inspired pieces. Next to tackling social and autobiographical issues, Dunn speaks to the contemporary art tradition of using toys and the concept of play as a means to reflect societies’ stereotypes, tastes, and desires.

In 2010, Dunn had her first group exhibition titled, "eXist" at the Frederick R. Weisman Museum of Art in Malibu, California.

In 2013, she released a series titled, "Plastic” featuring Barbie portraits at the Art of Elysium “Pieces of Heaven,” auction located at the ACE Museum in Los Angeles. At this auction, David Arquette who took part in the bidding, noticed Dunn's Barbie. Dunn's inspiration for her "Plastic" series and her interest in art stemmed from her experience growing up in Los Angeles.

Dunn exhibited in Los Angeles, New York City, London, Paris, St. Barts and Miami for Art Basel (2013). Her work was featured at LACMA for the third iteration of Around the Clock: DONUTS & CLOCKS with Dawn Kasper, a 24-hour performance installation. Dunn's piece, a clock inspired by Hello Kitty, is part of Shepard Fairey's personal collection.

From January to February 2014, Dunn's Barbie series, "Plastic," was a part of a group exhibition titled, MIA in MIA at the Lyons Wier Gallery in New York City. This exhibition also displayed works by Greg Haberny, James Austin Murray, Aaron Nagel and Tim Okamura.

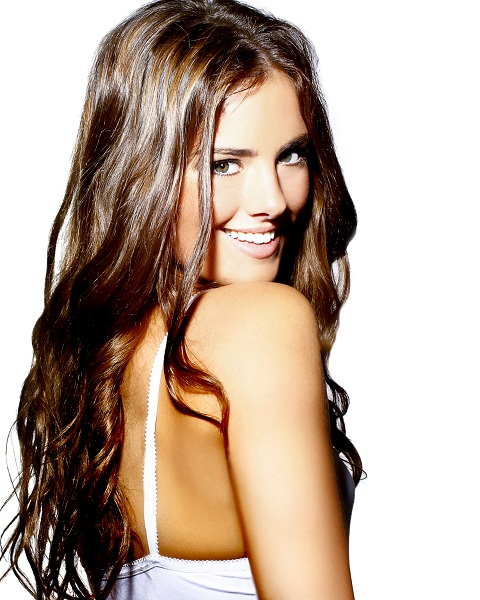
American model and actress Beau Dunn

On May 21, 2015, in London, the opening of Phillips auction “Photographs: Ultimate Contemporary” featured Dunn's media

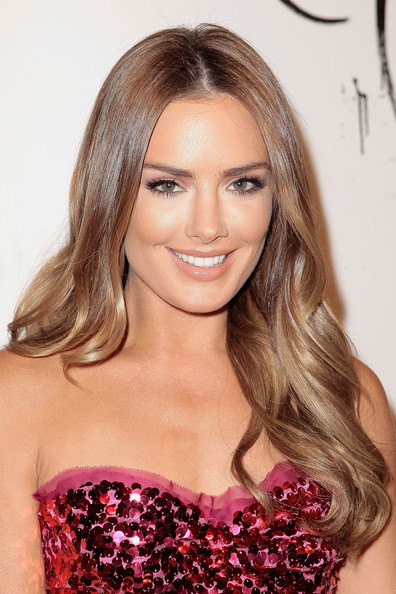
Beau Dunn at the 6th Annual, Art of Elysium Auction, 2013

piece Glam Barbie. It's an art piece created with thousands of Swarovski crystals applied by hand and sold for €10,000.00.

Kris Jenner came across Dunn's artwork through Robert Kardashian, a childhood friend and former classmate of Dunn at Buckley School. As a result, Dunn co-designed in August 2016, Jenner's new “Birkin Closet” that featured neon sculptures reading “NEED MONEY FOR BIRKIN”.

On November 17, 2016, Dunn debuted her first solo show titled “PLASTIC” at De Re Gallery in West Hollywood. This show displayed her “Plastic” Glam Barbie series encrusted with Swarovski crystals, her neon sculptures “Need Money for Birkin,” and “Need Money for Botox”.

Dunn was a featured artist at the 2016 Art Basel Miami satellite fair with the debut of her sculptural series “Gold Digger and Sugar Daddy,” Barbie, and “Size Does Matter.”

On May 29, Kylie Jenner revealed images of her new “Glam Room,” featuring two Barbie portraits created by Beau, estimated to have been purchased for $20,000.00 USD.

== Knee surgery ==
On May 10, 2017, Dunn had a freak accident fall while in South Africa, at the age of 29. Dunn returned to Los Angeles California to undergo an extensive left knee surgery, which resulted in over a year and a half on crutches and recovering in physical therapy in Los Angeles. On July 24, 2019, Dunn went into a second knee surgery at Kerlan & Jobe in Los Angeles to undergo a full knee reconstruction. Dunn spent another year on crutches, even attending the Golden Globes on Feel Better Bling Crutches - a company Dunn created blinging out and adding swarovski crystals on her Mobileg crutches. Dunn went into her third knee surgery in August 2021.

== Thyroid Cancer ==
On May 4, 2022, Beau Dunn shared the news via People Magazine that she had been diagnosed with Thyroid Cancer in 2021 and she says she’s “incredibly lucky” to have begun her surrogacy process beforehand, adding, “it feels like a bit of a miracle.” Dunn had a thyroidectomy and full cancer removal in the fall of 2021 and has declared she is currently cancer free as of May 2022.

== Philanthropy and humanitarian work ==
Dunn has worked closely with: The Art of Elysium, Children’s Action Network, Cure Lipedema, The Lipedema Foundation, Mattel Children’s Foundation, and UNICEF USA.

She was awarded the 2019 ‘Spirit of Elysium’ award for her service with The Art of Elysium in 2019. Beau has helped lead the organization's ‘Girl Talk’ program, an arts-based self-esteem workshop established by The Art of Elysium at Children’s Hospital Los Angeles to help girls who are patients of plastic surgery to improve anxiety, self-esteem, communication, empowerment, and positive self-image.

Dunn has also done major fundraising and sits on the boards for animal charities Road Dogs and The Sanctuary at Soledad.

Dunn was named the ‘2020 Global Ambassador’ for Road Dogs Charity - using her platform to spread awareness and save lives.

In 2022 Dunn announced she became an Ambassador for Walk with Sally, a California based charity supporting children impacted by cancer by providing care-centered one-to-one fellowships and additional programs and services to uplift the family unit and lessen the burden of cancer, after being diagnosed with Thyroid Cancer herself.

== Art exhibitions ==
In 2017 Dunn had her first solo exhibition in Los Angeles at De Re Gallery on Melrose Ave. She showed her series on neon works entitled “Next Generation,” her Barbie Series, her “Gold Digger and Sugar Daddy Sculpture,” and more. Lily Collins, Peyton List, and Jessie Metcalfe were a few of the famous faces that celebrated the opening of the exhibition.

- 2010 | eXist, Frederick R. Weisman Museum of Art, Malibu CA.
- 2013 | Barbie #4, Pieces of Heaven / Art of Elysium, Ace Museum, Los Angeles CA
- 2013 | Hello Kitty Clock, For Your Art / LACMA, Los Angeles CA.
- 2013 | Barbie #4, Dina Brown Gallery, "American All Star", Los Angeles CA.
- 2013 | Barbie Collection, Clic Gallery, New York, NY.
- 2013 | Barbie Collaboration with This Mean Mar, Lab Art Gallery, Los Angeles CA.
- 2013 | Barbie Collection, Lyons Wier Gallery, Art Basel, Aqua, Miami, FL.
- 2014 | Barbie Collection, Lyons Wier Gallery, "MIA in MIA", New York, NY.
- 2014 | Barbie Collaboration with This Means Mar, and Barbie Collection, Gallery 446, Palm Springs, CA.
- 2014 | Doheny Drive, Pieces of Heaven / Art of Elysium, Siren Studios, Los Angeles CA.
- 2015 | Bad B*TCH, Pieces of Heaven / Art of Elysium, Los Angeles CA.
- 2015 | Glam Barbie #1, Photographs, Philips Auction, Mayfair London.
- 2015 | Chainlink Gallery, Opening Reception: November 13: 1051 S Fairfax Ave, Los Angeles CA.
- 2016 | Pieces of Heaven, Art of Elysium, Los Angeles.
- 2016 | Group Exhibition / Madison Gallery, La Jolla, CA.
- 2016 | Size Does Matter / Madison Gallery, La Jolla, CA.
- 2016 | Group Exhibition / De Re Gallery, Los Angeles CA.
- 2016 | Solo Pop-Up Show entitled Plastic / De Re Gallery, Los Angeles CA.
- 2016 | Art Miami Fair, Art Basel, Miami Florida / De Re Gallery.
- 2016 | Group Show. Oliver Cole Gallery, Art Basel, Miami, Florida.
- 2017 | Barbie #1 / Heaven Gala / The Art of Elysium, Los Angeles CA.
- 2017 | Need Money For Birkin / Group Show / Art Angels Gallery, Los Angeles CA.
- 2018 | Group Show : Art Angels, Design District, Miami, Florida.
- 2018 | Auction : Pieces of Heaven, The Art of Elysium, Beverly Hills, CA.
- 2018 | Art Miami Fair, Art Basel, Miami Florida / Art Angels Gallery.
- 2018 | Need Money For ..., Art Angels Gallery, Miami, Florida.
- 2018 | Group Show / Art Angels Gallery, Los Angeles, CA.
- 2019 | Art Angels, Design District, Art Basel, Miami, Florida.
- 2019 | Group Show: Art Angels, Design District, Miami, Florida.
- 2019 | Group Show : Art Angels, Los Angeles, CA.
- 2020 | Winter Contemporary, Maddox Gallery, Gstaad.
- 2020 | Autumn Contemporary, Maddox Gallery, Gstaad.
- 2020 | Autumn Contemporary, Maddox Gallery, London, UK.
- 2020 | Summer Contemporary, Maddox Gallery, London, UK.
- 2020 | GOING HOME: a picture show. TZ Projects, Los Angeles, CA.
- 2020 | HerStory : Women in Art, Maddox Gallery, London, UK.
- 2020 | Summer Contemporary, Maddox Gallery, Gstaad
- 2021 | UNICEF USA x Next Generation COVID-19, Plastic Gallery.

== Works and publications ==
=== Brand collaborations ===
In May 2022, Dunn collaborated with London Based Jeweler Celeste Starre in releasing a 22-piece collection ranging from stacking rings and ear cuffs to statement earrings and necklaces.

== Television and filmography ==
Year	Title	Role	Notes
2011	Up All Night	Katie	TV series
2011	Entourage	Vince's Ex	Episode: "Second to Last"
2011	Melissa & Joey	Gwen	Episode: "Toledo's Next Top Model"
2011	Jimmy Kimmel Live	Top Model	Episode #10.7
2012	El Jefe	Stephanie	TV movie
2012	CSI: Crime Scene Investigation	Joyce Debernardi	Episode: "Tressed to Kill"
2012	Blue Eyed Butcher	Pretty Hostess	TV movie
2013	January Man	Beautiful Woman	Short Film

== Awards ==
Dunn received the Spirit of Elysium Award for her service with The Art of Elysium in 2019. Dunn has helped lead the organization's ‘Girl Talk’ program, an arts-based self-esteem workshop established by The Art of Elysium at Children’s Hospital Los Angeles to help girls who are patients of plastic surgery to improve anxiety, self-esteem, communication, empowerment, and positive self-image.

- 2019 - Spirit of Elysium Award for Art of Elysium - WON
- 2018 - Bad Ass Women Award - Instyle Magazine - WON
- 2015 - Social Media Influencer Award for Follow Friday LA - WON
