= DSTLD =

American clothing company

- Company type: Private
- Industry: Clothing
- Predecessor: 20Jeans
- Founded: 2014; 11 years ago in Los Angeles, California, US
- Founders: Corey Epstein; Ryan Jaleh; Mark Lynn
- Website: www.dstld.com

DSTLD (pronounced distilled) is an American clothing company, founded in 2014 by Corey Epstein, Ryan Jaleh and Mark Lynn and backed by Asher New York Holdings. The California-based company designs and retails a line of mostly denim-based clothing. The company has become known for its relatively affordable pricing, environmentally friendly design and manufacturing, a direct-to-consumer retail strategy.

== History ==
DSTLD was founded by co-CEOs Corey Epstein, Ryan Jaleh and Mark Lynn. The company was first founded by Epstein as 20Jeans and operated by buying overstock fabric from Los Angeles-based high-end jeans designers to be sent overseas, to places like Hong Kong and Shanghai, turning the fabric waste into low-cost jeans that the company then resold for $20. Epstein was joined Lynn and the two rebranded the company as DSTLD in April 2014. They hired Anh Vu, formerly of Gap Inc. to head the initial design team. In April 2016, DSTLD hired designer Paul Roughley, previously of Kill City Clothing, as the new design director.

The company gained a seed round investment of $4.4 million from investors including CAA Ventures and CrunchFund. In September 2015, the company announced that it will be using the SeedInvest platform to offer its customers the opportunity to directly invest in the start-up. The crowdfunding was made possible by the Jumpstart Our Business Startups Act. By the end the month, "DSTLD had received more than $7.6 million in indicated interest." In summer 2016, the company announced a Series A round open to the public. As of August 2016, it had gained funds "from more than 450 people investing an average of $2,400." By April 2017, using SeedInvest, the company had raised $1.75 million. In August 2017, the company reopened the platform for a second round of investment through crowdfunding.

In January 2019, DSTLD announced it was looking to open a UK showroom and list on London's AIM stock market. The company intends to use the funds it raised at the end of 2018 for the expansion- around £1.6 million.
