= Tommee Tippee =

Child care brand

- Product type: Baby care
- Current owner: Ping An Insurance
- Country: United Kingdom
- Introduced: 1965; 61 years ago
- Markets: Worldwide
- Website: www.tommeetippee.com

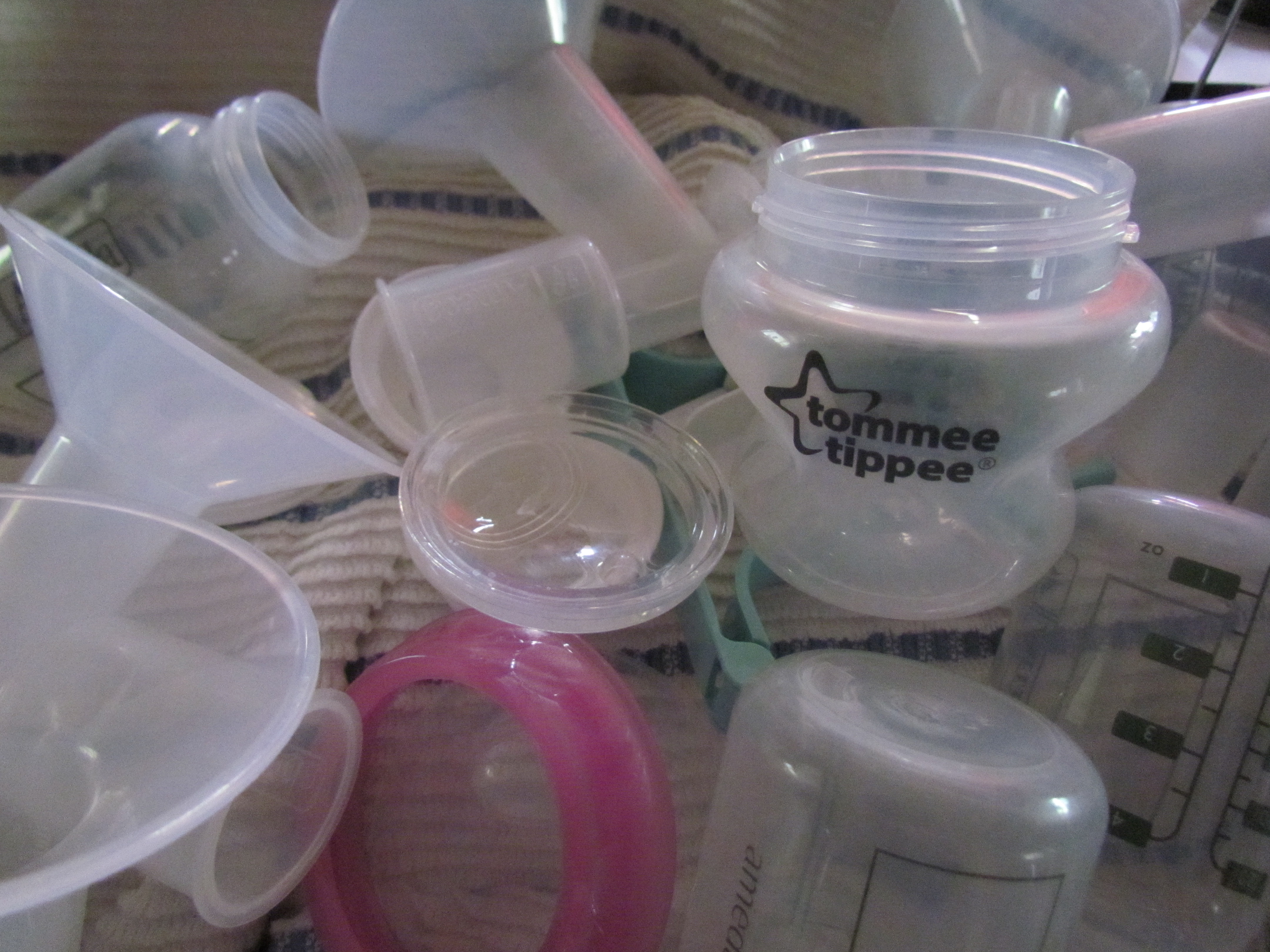
Breast pumps by Tommee Tippee

Tommee Tippee is a feeding bottle and child care brand based in Newcastle upon Tyne, United Kingdom. Its parent company, Mayborn Group is owned by Chinese insurance company Ping An Insurance. As of 2015, it was the fifth largest child care company in the world and is known for its spill-proof cups.

The brand has 11 percent market share of the baby accessories in the United Kingdom, United States, France, South Africa, Australia, and New Zealand. It competes with brands such as Pigeon, Medela, Philips Avent, and Munchkin.

== History ==
Founded in 1960s in the United States and was owned by Guinness Group.

In 2006, it was acquired by British private equity firm 3i for £137 million.

In 2016, its parent company, Mayborn Group, was acquired for $372 million by Chinese insurance company Ping An.

In early 2021, Tommee Tippee caused controversy after it launched a breastfeeding campaign called “The Boob Life” which celebrated mothers and breastfeeding. Its campaign-related media on Facebook was banned as it featured visible nipples and went against the platform's rules.

In July 2021, Tommee Tippee issued a public apology after causing controversy by implying in an article on its website that breastfeeding wasn't always the best mode of feeding, and that bottle feeding with formula milk could be better.

In 2024, Tommee Tippee was involved in a class action lawsuit for their bottles leaching microplastics when heated.

== See also ==
- Philips Avent
- Munchkin
- PUR
