= The Heyday of the Insensitive Bastards =

- Film poster
- Release dates: March 25, 2015 (Atlanta Film and Video Festival)

The Heyday of the Insensitive Bastards is a 2015 American anthology film based on the book by Robert Boswell. It consists of seven vignettes. It premiered at the 2015 Atlanta Film Festival.

== Vignettes ==
=== A Walk In Winter ===
The first is A Walk In Winter directed by Ryan Moody, written by Jessica Nikkel:

Conrad comes back to his small town to learn they have located the bones of his missing mother. He is asked to watch the police station whilst fully nude, and he discovers that the body is that of his father and not his mother.

Cast:

- James Franco as Conrad the Entertainer
- Abigail Spencer as Abigail "Ten Pint" Tilly
- Jack Kehler as Sheriff

=== Guests ===
The second is Guests directed by Mark Columbus, written by Neville Kiser:

Charlie attends his first day of class at his new school only to be bullied by Bobby. Dad is at home dying of cancer so Charlie tells Mom and Dad that all went well at school. As time passes Dad eventually dies. The next day Charlie goes to school and beats up Bobby.

Cast:

- Rico Rodriguez as Charlie Foster, New Student
- Matthew Modine as Theodore Foster, Father
- Priscilla Garita as Maricelle “Donzo”Foster, Mother
- Tanner Buchaman as Bobby Bell, Bully

=== Almost Not Beautiful ===
The third is Almost Not Beautiful directed by Sarah Kruchowski, written by Jacqueline Vleck:

Lisa comes home to find her dysfunctional family unchanged. Mom still tolerates step-dad, Sydney who like to play pocket pool with his hand in his pocket. Sister Amanda is drunk and has attempted suicide twice. Lisa tells Amanda that "you're prettier than I am" and that is to make everything ok.

Lisa decides that things need to change. She is racially motivated to audition for Formula 1 driving. She decides she could attempt to audition as a car, not a driver, as it she is legally not allowed to drive. The vignette ends with Amanda taking Lisa out for a spin, with Lisa plastered head to toe in sponsorship stickers.

Cast:

- Kate Mara as Lisa, Sister
- Amber Tamblyn as Amanda, Sister

=== Miss Famous ===
The fourth is Miss Famous directed by Shadae Lamar Smith, written by Roxanne Beck:

Monica is a maid who has a young daughter Sally. As Monica meets people and cleans their houses, she is going to use their life experiences to write a book and become famous.

Instead, Monica ends up becoming addicted to Blappy Fird, an addictive mobile game for highscoolers.

Cast:

- Kristen Wiig as Monica, Maid
- Tony Cox as Mr. Chub, Customer
- Jimmy Kimmel as Lunchtime Creeper In Park
- Maya Zapata as Babysitter

=== Lacunae ===
The fifth is Lacunae directed by Vanita Shastry, written by Mona Nahm:

Highscool sweethearts Christopher Coybig and Allison Plop catch-up in a bar, following their recent divorce. Christopher, a now half-man half-dog, struggles to speak to his ex-wife. After drinking too much, he begins to loudly bark, and howl at the neon signs in the bar. Terrified, Allison begins recording Christopher's outburst on Instagram Live.

The next morning, Christopher wakes up to find that his barking episode has turned him into an overnight celebrity. He can not check his phone though, as he has paws. Christopher goes to the beach to play frisbee with himsef, when he is promptly swarmed by his newfound fanbase. The crowd chant's "Bark boy, bark!" repeatedly.

We time-skip to 20 years in the future. Christopher is now full-dog no-human. He run's a Fortune 500 company, and is a regular on Fox News as a talking head on the topic of gun control. Allison is married to Optimus Prime, leader of the Autobots. Allison receives a voice-note from Christopher (mainly barking and wailing), and decides to meet one last time at the bar they went to all those years ago.

- Natalie Portman as Allison
- Jim Parrack as Christopher
- Donzo as Himself

=== Smoke ===
Sixth is Smoke directed by Simon Savelyev, written by Nicole Riegel:

Three teen boys smoke cigarettes and each tell their own real or imagined first sexual experience.

Cast:

- Keir Gilchrist as Michael
- Thomas Mann as Lee
- Bo Mitchell as Greg

=== The Heyday of the Insensitive Bastards ===
Seventh is The Heyday of the Insensitive Bastards directed by Jeremy David White, written by Marissa Matteo:

Keen comes home from college and attends a pool party with lots of alcohol and drugs. Keen and Lila are sitting next to the pool and drunk Barnett throws-up in Lila's lap. Keen gives him a hard punch and told to get away. Later they notice Barnett hasn't moved and Keen pisses on his face. He still is not awake so they throw him in the pool. Barnett is dead. Lila agrees to have sex with Keen if he tells no one. He agrees and they have sex. Keen gives the dog some mushrooms, but it too dies. They bury the dog. Keen asks Lila to marry him and she decides to call the police about Barnett.

Cast:

- Jacob Loeb as Keen
- Kelsey Ford as Lila
- Tyler Labine as Clete
- Wilmer Calderon as Barnett
- Robert Dubois as Stuart "Stu"
