= Cameron Silver =

American fashion journalist

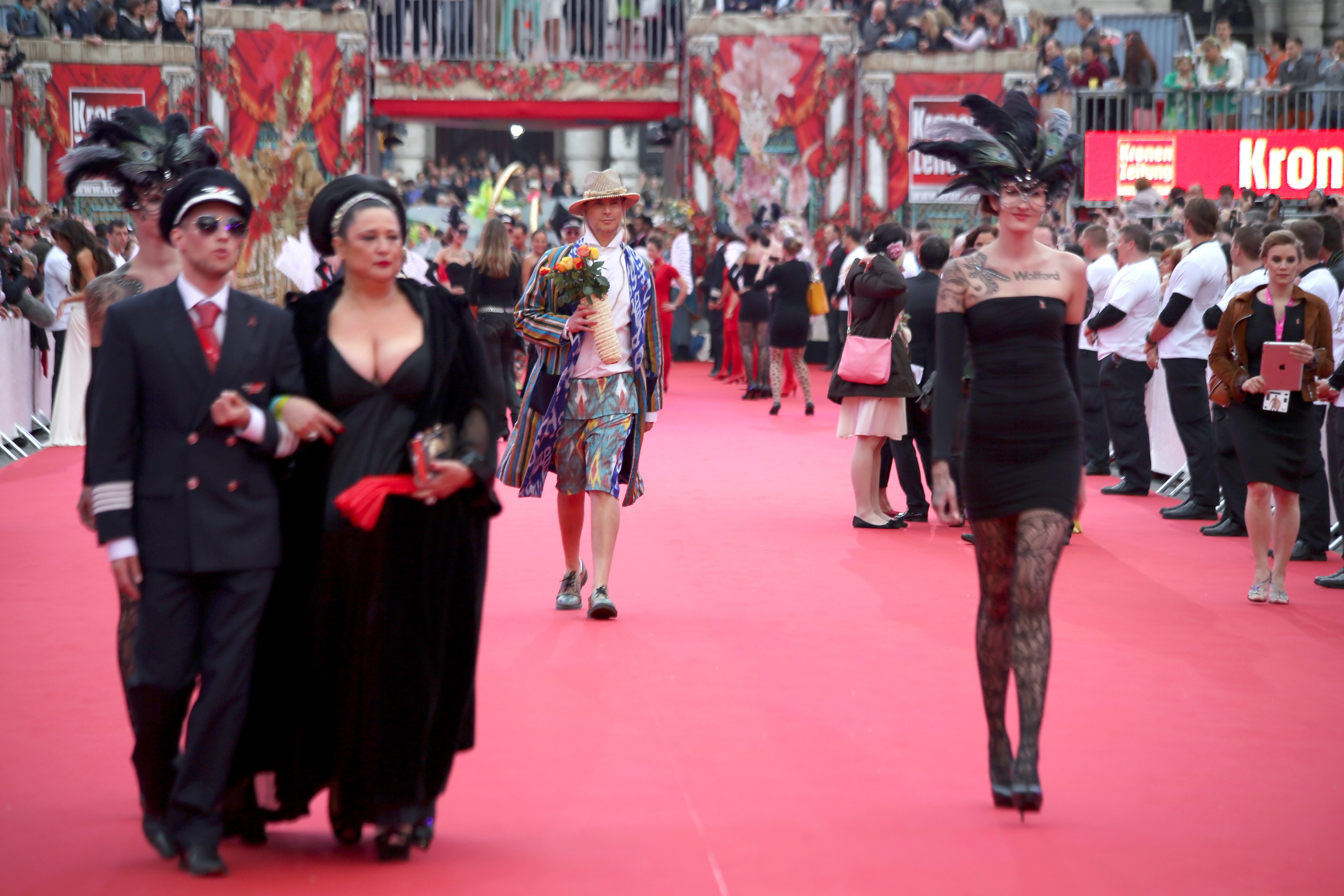
Cameron Silver arriving at Life Ball 2014

Cameron Silver is a fashion director, retailer, author, and entertainment personality. Silver is the former fashion director of the brand Halston.

He is the founder of the vintage boutique Decades and the former fashion director of Halston. In 2002, Time magazine named him one of the "25 Most Influential Names and Faces in Fashion." He has also starred in the Bravo reality television series Dukes of Melrose and hosted the Instagram Live series "Candid Cameron in The Hamptons".

== Early life ==
Cameron was born in Los Angeles and grew up in Beverly Hills.

Silver released an album with Hollywood Records called Berlin to Babylon.

== Decades ==
Silver is the founder of Decades, a vintage couture boutique in Los Angeles, California. The boutique's clientele has included celebrity figures such as Chloë Sevigny, Julia Roberts, Gwyneth Paltrow, Dita von Teese, Rihanna, and Lady Gaga.

== Collaborations ==
Silver is the former fashion director of H by Halston, which was launched on QVC in September 2015, with Silver serving as its on-air representative.

Silver has served as an official brand ambassador for Pringle and Boucheron, and as a creative consultant for Azzaro, for whom he served as creative consultant. He advised a number of international luxury brands including Balmain, Dolce Gabbana, Etro, Marni, and Michael Kors.

== Other work ==
Silver has worked with the Met, the LACMA, the MOCA and the Art of Elysium.

In January 2012, Silver was recognized as the Year's Visionary by The Art of Elysium.

In February 2012, in conjunction with the 2012 awards season, Silver assisted Curators at the Museum of Contemporary Art's Design Center in Los Angeles (MOCA) with an exhibit designed by Marmol Radziner.

As a fashion commentator, he has made appearances on E! Entertainment, the Style Network and Fashion File. He has also written for Harpers Bazaar (UK), C Magazine, Departures, Style.com. In May 2024, his newest book CAFTANS: From Classical to Camp was released by Vendome Press https://www.vendomepress.com/book/caftans-from-classical-to-camp/.
