= Yosemite (film) =

2015 film by Gabrielle Demeestere

- Film poster
- Directed by: Gabrielle Demeestere
- Written by: Gabrielle Demeestere
- Produced by: Clara Aranovich; Paul Bernon; Nicolaas Bertelsen; Shruti Ganguly; Sev Ohanian
- Starring: Henry Hopper; James Franco
- Cinematography: Chananun Chotrungroj; Bruce Thierry Cheung
- Edited by: Joe Murphy
- Music by: Ryder McNair
- Production company: Rabbit Bandini Productions
- Distributed by: Monterey Media (US)
- Release date: January 29, 2015 (Slamdance Film Festival)
- Running time: 80 minutes
- Country: United States
- Language: English
- Box office: $13,931

Yosemite is a 2015 American independent drama film written and directed by Gabrielle Demeestere. The film is based on the short stories Yosemite and Peter Parker by James Franco. It stars James Franco, Henry Hopper, Calum John, Alec Mansky and Everett Meckler.

== Plot ==
It's the fall of 1985. The intertwining tales of three 5th grade friends, Ted, Joe and Chris, unfold in the suburban paradise of Palo Alto, as the threat of a mountain lion looms over the community.

== Cast ==
- James Franco as Phil, Chris's father
- Henry Hopper as Henry, Joe's friend
- Calum John as Ted
- Alec Mansky as Joe
- Everett Meckler as Chris
- Troy Tinnirello as Alex, Chris's brother
- Steven Wiig as Michael, Ted's father

== Production ==
Yosemite was adapted and expanded from Yosemite and Peter Parker, two short stories written by James Franco. James Franco then used his Rabbit Bandini company to produce the film.

The film was shot in various locations in Yosemite National Park. The director had chosen the locations, but many of them ended up being a lot of the places that Franco and his father had visited when he was a child.

== Reception ==
On review aggregator Rotten Tomatoes, the film has an approval rating of 77% based on 13 reviews, with an average rating of 6.60/10. On Metacritic, the film has a weighted average score of 59 out of 100, based on 7 critics, indicating "mixed or average reviews".

== Accolades ==
- 2015 Slamdance Film Festival: Tangerine Entertainment Award for Best Female Director (win) – Gabrielle Demeestere, Official Selection (nom)
- 2015 Nashville Film Festival: Women in Film & TV Award (win) – Gabrielle Demeestere, Bridgestone Narrative Feature Competition (nom)
- 2015 Portland Film Festival: Official Selection (nom)
- 2015 Denver International Film Festival: Best Feature Film (nom)
- 2015 Seattle International Film Festival: Official Selection (nom)
- 2015 Sarasota Film Festival: Narrative Feature Film Competition (nom)
- 2015 Provincetown International Film Festival: Official Selection (nom)
- 2016 Americana Film Fest: Next – Gabrielle Demeestere (nom)
