= Obey Giant (film) =

Obey Giant: The Art and Dissent of Shepard Fairey
- Directed by: James Moll
- Produced by: James Moll; Tim Calandrello; Amanda Fairey; James Franco; Jennifer Howell; Vince Jolivette; Josh Kesselman; Jeff Ciabattari
- Starring: Shepard Fairey
- Cinematography: Harris Done
- Edited by: Tim Calandrello
- Music by: Dhani Harrison; Paul Hicks
- Production companies: Elysium Bandini Studios; Allentown Productions; Thruline Entertainment
- Distributed by: Hulu
- Release date: November 11, 2017
- Running time: 92 minutes
- Country: United States
- Language: English

Obey Giant: The Art and Dissent of Shepard Fairey is a 2017 American documentary film directed and produced by James Moll about the life and career of street artist and graphic designer Shepard Fairey. The film covers "Fairey's life from his beginning doodles to his iconic "Hope" poster for the Obama campaign and Obey campaigns." It premiered on Hulu on November 11, 2017.

== Premise ==
The documentary follows "the life and work of artist Shepard Fairey, going deep into the world of street art and its role in politics and pop culture. Obey Giant follows Fairey's rise from his roots in punk rock and skateboarding, to his role as one of the most well-known and influential street artists in the world - through his iconic Obama "HOPE" poster and the controversy that surrounds it."

== See also ==
- List of original programs distributed by Hulu
