= Munchkin (company) =

American infant and toddler products company

Munchkin, Inc.
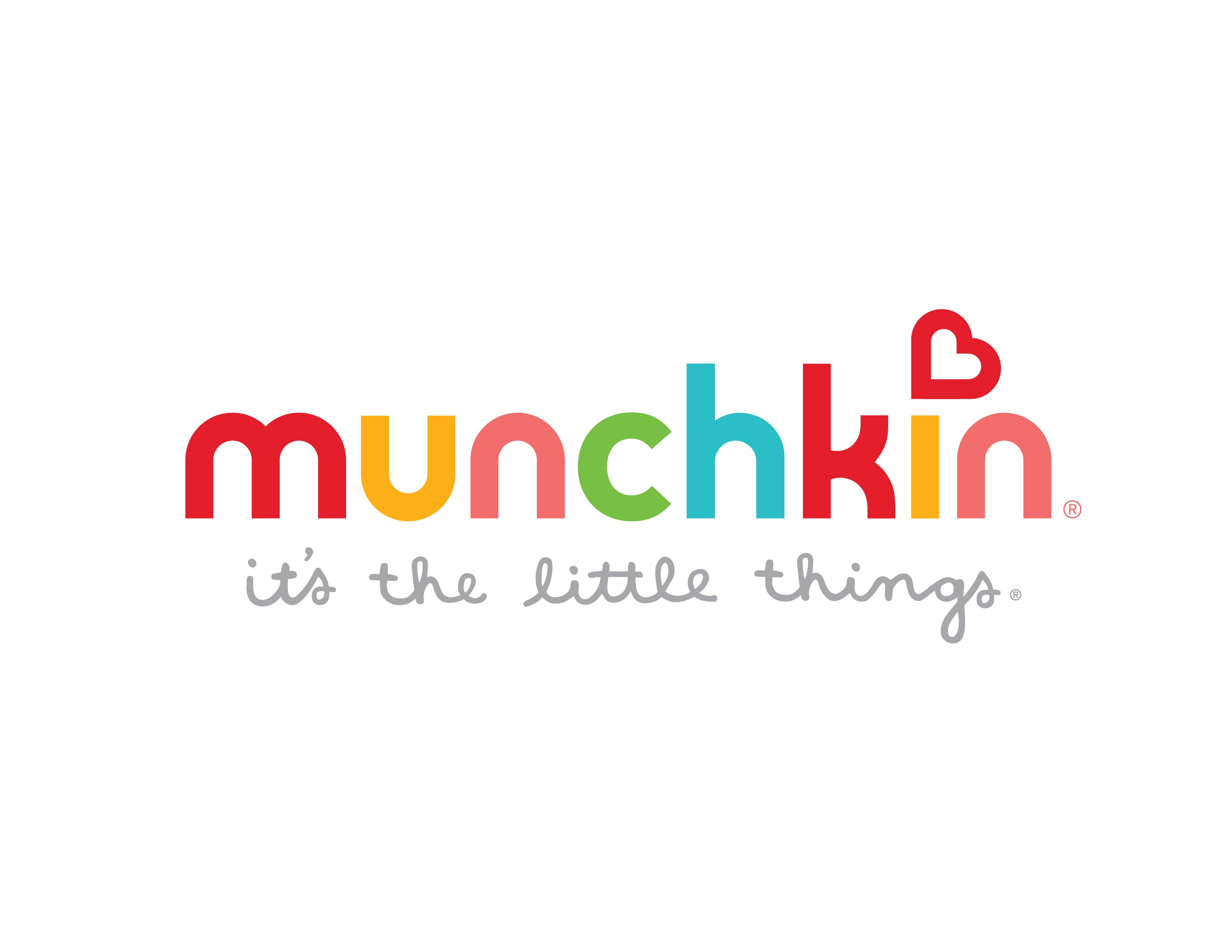
- Company type: Private company
- Industry: Infant and toddler products
- Founded: 1991
- Headquarters: Van Nuys, California, United States
- Area served: Worldwide
- Key people: Steven B. Dunn (CEO) Tom Emrey (CFO/COO) Diana Barnes (CBO)
- Products: Child and parenting products for feeding, bath, travel, safety, gates, nursery, diapering
- Number of employees: 280
- Website: www.munchkin.com

Munchkin, Inc. is a privately-held company headquartered in Van Nuys, California known for designing, developing, manufacturing and distributing infant and toddler products. It was founded in 1991 by Steven B. Dunn, its CEO.

== History ==
Steven B. Dunn founded Munchkin with $2.5 million in 1991. By 1995, its products were distributed in 20 countries.

In 2010, Munchkin acquired Lindam, a Harrogate UK-based safety product brand for babies.

In 2014, Munchkin acquired Brica, a maker of travel accessories for babies and toddlers.

In 2016, Munchkin acquired Milkmakers, a manufacturer of lactogenic cookies.

In February 2020, the company added prenatal tea, belly balm, and nausea relief drops to its Milkmaker line.

In January 2022, Munchkin announced it was working with sustainable polymer additive company Smart Plastic Technologies. Through the partnership, Munchkin will use Smart Plastic's Eclipse technology which is designed to bioassimilate polyolefins such as polyethylene and polypropylene, so the plastic completely biodegrades.

In July 2025, a civil lawsuit was filed against Munchkin for alleged bias and harassment against working mothers at the company, and for allegedly retaliating against the former general counsel when he had attempted to intervene.

== Business ==
Munchkin manufactures more than 600 products for infants and toddlers. It holds over 300 patents, including one for its Miracle 360 sippy cup. Dunn serves as the lead inventor for many of the company's products.

The company also has a licensing deal with Baby Toon, a soft silicone spoon designed by Cassidy Crowley, who featured in the season 11 premiere episode of the reality investment TV program Shark Tank when she was 10 years old.

Former NBC anchor, Lynn Smith, is the host of Munchkin's podcast "StrollerCoaster: A Parenting Podcast."

In 2023, Fortune magazine ranked Munchkin eighth on their list of America’s most innovative companies.

The company’s Chief Brand Officer, Diana “DB” Barnes, was recognized as one of “20 of the world’s top CMOs” in 2024 by Fast Company. Barnes was also lead designer of the company’s 2024 sustainability report that won a “Gold in Print” prize awarded by the International Design Awards.

Munchkin has been named to the magazine’s “Brands That Matter” list for two years in a row in 2023 and 2024.

== Sustainability ==
Munchkin's sustainability efforts include goals to reduce packing materials and increase its use of recyclable plastics.

The company participates in Walmart's Project Gigaton to reduce greenhouse gas emissions, and is also part of the United Nations Global Compact sustainability initiative.

After a pet-rescue organization in Missouri informed the company that the packaging material from some of its infant drinking cups had injured one of its rescued cats, Munchkin redesigned the packaging so that it was plastic-free and animal-safe. The new packaging is made of 60 to 70 percent recycled, compostable material, and is now used on a broad range of Munchkin products. The change has also reduced the amount of plastic Munchkin uses by over 320 tons annually.

Munchkin is a sponsor of the Seedling Project and plants a tree for every diaper pail sold. As of February 2020, the project reported that more than 2,000,000 trees had been planted.

In 2022, the Los Angeles Business Journal named Munchkin Honoree Sustainable Company of the Year. In recognition of the company's efforts reduce packaging-related waste, Fast Company included Munchkin in its 2023 list of "Brands that Matter."

== Philanthropy ==
In 2015, after watching the documentary Blackfish, Dunn pledged to donate $1 million to the Whale Sanctuary Project to help build a coastal ocean sanctuary for captive orcas. In 2018, Munchkin partnered with the International Fund for Animal Welfare by featuring at-risk or endangered animals, such as the African elephant and red fox, on a line of its Miracle Cups to raise awareness about conservation and animal rights.

The company also supports Children's Hospital Los Angeles and Baby2Baby.

Munchkin is an ongoing donor to Trees for the Future and has funded the planting of over 4 million trees in sub-Saharan Africa. In 2023, the company donated $1 million and 90,000 acres to the International Fund for Animal Welfare’s “Room to Roam” initiative in Zimbabwe to provide secure migration routes for endangered elephants.
