= Charlie and the Chocolate Factory (franchise) =

Fantasy media franchise created by Roald Dahl

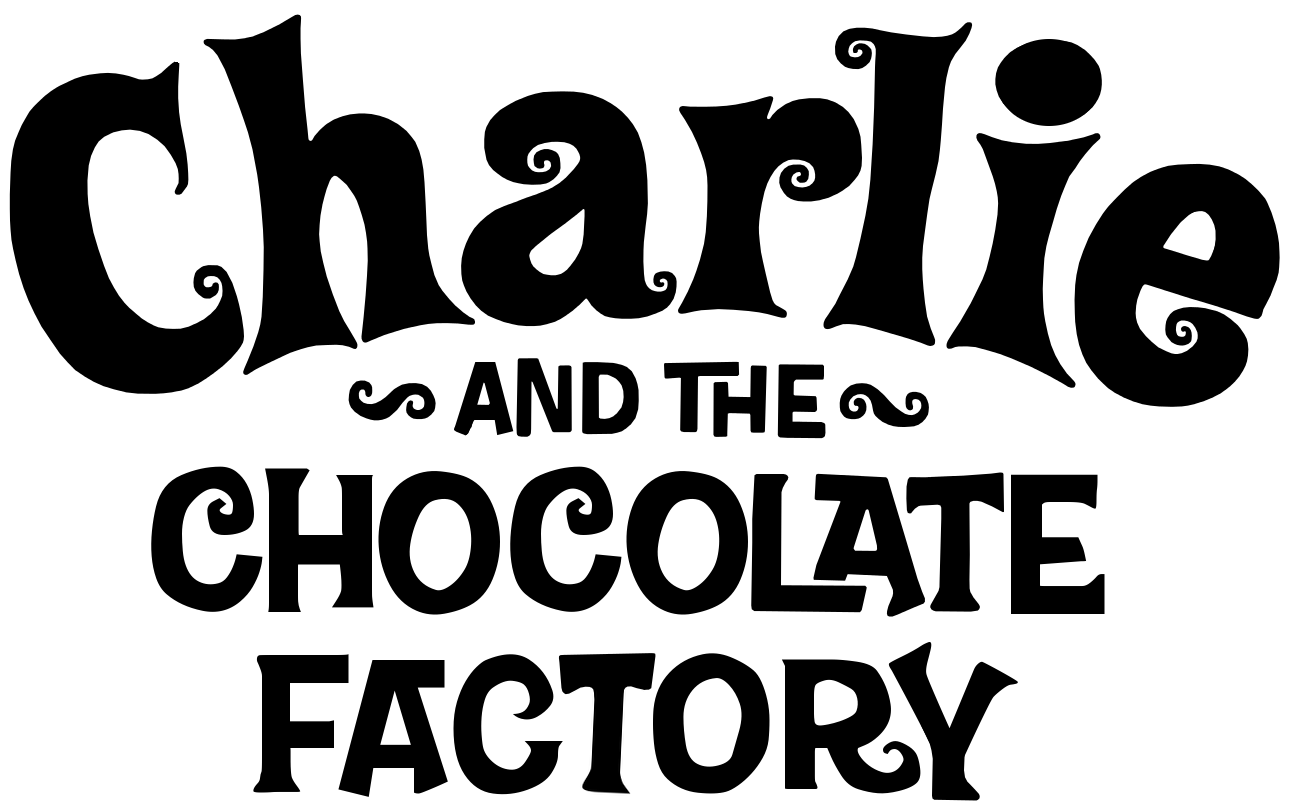
- Official logo for the 2005 film adaptation
- Created by: Roald Dahl
- Original work: Charlie and the Chocolate Factory (1964)
- Years: 1964–present

Print publications
- Books: Charlie and the Chocolate Factory (1964); Charlie and the Great Glass Elevator (1972); Charlie and the Christmas Factory (2024); Chaos at the Chocolate Factory (2026); The Terrible Miss Trunchbull and Other Tales of Tricks & Villainy (2026)

Films and television
- Films: Willy Wonka & the Chocolate Factory (1971); Charlie and the Chocolate Factory (2005); Wonka (2023); Charlie vs. the Chocolate Factory (2027)
- Direct-to-video: Tom and Jerry: Willy Wonka and the Chocolate Factory (2017)

Theatrical presentations
- Musicals: Roald Dahl's Willy Wonka (2004); Charlie and the Chocolate Factory (2013)

Games
- Video games: Charlie and the Chocolate Factory (1985); Charlie and the Chocolate Factory (2005); Poptropica: Charlie and the Chocolate Factory Island (2012-present)

Audio
- Soundtracks: Charlie and the Chocolate Factory (2005); Charlie and the Chocolate Factory the Musical (2013); Wonka (2023)
- Original music: Pure Imagination (1971); The Candy Man (1971)

Miscellaneous
- Theme park attraction: Charlie and the Chocolate Factory: The Ride (2006–2015)
- Candy brand: The Willy Wonka Candy Company (1971–2015; today named Nestlé Candy Shop)
- Confections: Wonka Bar; Everlasting Gobstopper
- Unlicensed attraction: Willy's Chocolate Experience

Charlie and the Chocolate Factory is a media franchise based on the 1964 novel of the same name by the British author Roald Dahl. It includes two novels, three live-action feature films, three video games, and miscellaneous other properties, such as touring musicals and theatrical adaptations, various merchandise, and defunct amusement park ride.

== Books ==
=== Charlie and the Chocolate Factory (1964) ===
Charlie and the Chocolate Factory is a children's novel by the British author Roald Dahl. The story features the adventures of young Charlie Bucket inside the chocolate factory of the eccentric chocolatier Willy Wonka. Charlie and the Chocolate Factory was first published in the United States by Alfred A. Knopf in 1964 and in the United Kingdom by George Allen & Unwin in 1967.

=== Charlie and the Great Glass Elevator (1972) ===
Charlie and the Great Glass Elevator is the sequel to Charlie and the Chocolate Factory, continuing the story of Charlie Bucket and Willy Wonka as they travel in the Great Glass Elevator. Charlie and the Great Glass Elevator was first published in the United States by Alfred A. Knopf in 1972, and in the United Kingdom by George Allen & Unwin in 1973.

=== Unfinished third novel ===
A follow-up to the novel was planned, called Charlie in the White House. Charlie's family and Mr. Wonka are invited by President Gilligrass to have dinner at the White House, as thanks for rescuing the spacecraft from its attack by the Vermicious Knids. Dahl only wrote the first chapter, which is on display at the Roald Dahl Museum and Story Centre in Great Missenden.

=== Charlie and the Christmas Factory (2024) ===
Charlie and the Christmas Factory, a collection of twelve short stories inspired by Roald Dahl books and written by various authors, was released in the United Kingdom in 2024. The titular Charlie and the Christmas Factory story was written by Sibéal Pounder, who had previously written the novelisation of the film Wonka.

An American version was released in 2026, but for unknown reasons it only includes six of the twelve stories from the United Kingdom edition.

=== Chaos at the Chocolate Factory (2026) ===
Chaos at the Chocolate Factory, a sequel novella written by Sibéal Pounder, was released in the United Kingdom for World Book Day in 2026. A release outside the United Kingdom has yet to be announced.

=== The Terrible Miss Trunchbull and Other Tales of Tricks & Villainy (2026) ===
The Terrible Miss Trunchbull and Other Tales of Tricks & Villainy, a second collection of short stories inspired by Roald Dahl books and written by various authors, was released in the United Kingdom in 2026. One of the stories is inspired by Charlie and the Chocolate Factory and written by Swapna Haddow. A release outside the United Kingdom has yet to be announced.

== Films ==
Film	U.S. release date	Director	Screenwriter(s)	Producer(s)
Willy Wonka & the Chocolate Factory	June 30, 1971	Mel Stuart	Roald Dahl	Stan Margulies & David L. Wolper
Charlie and the Chocolate Factory	July 15, 2005	Tim Burton	John August	Brad Grey & Richard D. Zanuck
Tom and Jerry: Willy Wonka and the Chocolate Factory	June 27, 2017	Spike Brandt	Gene Grillo	Spike Brandt & Tony Cervone
Wonka	December 15, 2023	Paul King	Paul King & Simon Farnaby	Luke Kelly, David Heyman & Alexandra Derbyshire
Charlie vs. the Chocolate Factory	November 5, 2027	Jared Stern; Elaine Bogan	TBA	Aron Warner & Timothy Yoo

=== Willy Wonka & the Chocolate Factory (1971) ===
Willy Wonka & the Chocolate Factory is a 1971 musical film adaptation of the 1964 novel Charlie and the Chocolate Factory by Roald Dahl. It was directed by Mel Stuart and starred Gene Wilder as Willy Wonka. The film tells the story of Charlie Bucket as he receives a golden ticket and visits Willy Wonka's chocolate factory with four other children from around the world. Filming took place in Munich in 1970, and the film was released on 30 June 1971. It received positive reviews, but was a box office disappointment despite the fact that it recouped its budget. It, however, developed into a cult film due to its repeated television airings and home video sales. In 1972 the film received an Academy Award nomination for Best Original Score.

=== Charlie and the Chocolate Factory (2005) ===
Charlie and the Chocolate Factory is a 2005 film adaptation of the 1964 novel of the same name by Roald Dahl. The film was directed by Tim Burton. The film stars Freddie Highmore as Charlie Bucket and Johnny Depp as Willy Wonka. The storyline concerns Charlie, who takes a tour he has won, led by Wonka, through the most magnificent chocolate factory in the world. Development for another adaptation of Charlie and the Chocolate Factory, filmed previously as Willy Wonka & the Chocolate Factory, began in 1991, 20 years after the first film version, which resulted in Warner Bros. Pictures providing the Dahl Estate with total artistic control. Prior to Burton's involvement, directors such as Gary Ross, Rob Minkoff, Martin Scorsese and Tom Shadyac had been involved, while Warner Bros. either considered or discussed the role of Willy Wonka with Nicolas Cage, Jim Carrey, Michael Keaton, Brad Pitt, Will Smith and Adam Sandler. Burton immediately brought regular collaborators Johnny Depp and Danny Elfman aboard. Charlie and the Chocolate Factory represents the first time since The Nightmare Before Christmas that Elfman contributed to the film score using written songs and his vocals. Filming took place from June to December 2004 at Pinewood Studios in the United Kingdom, where Burton avoided using digital effects as much as possible. Charlie and the Chocolate Factory was released to critical praise and was a box office success, grossing approximately US$475 million worldwide.

=== Tom and Jerry: Willy Wonka and the Chocolate Factory (2017) ===
Tom and Jerry: Willy Wonka and the Chocolate Factory is a 2017 animated direct-to-video musical comedy film starring the cat-and-mouse duo Tom and Jerry. Produced by Warner Bros. Animation and Turner Entertainment Co., it is the first Tom and Jerry direct-to-video film to be distributed by Warner Bros. Home Entertainment internationally and is also the final Tom and Jerry direct-to-video film to be involved with Warner Bros. Animation's founder Hal Geer, who died on January 26, 2017. The film is an animated remake of the 1971 film Willy Wonka & the Chocolate Factory (which in turn is based on the 1964 book Charlie and the Chocolate Factory by Dahl) with the addition of Tom and Jerry as characters and seen through their point of view.

The film was released via digital media on 27 June 2017, and released on home media on 11 July. It was panned by critics, who found the inclusion of Tom and Jerry in the story to be forced and unnecessary.

=== Wonka (2023) ===
A prequel film, focusing on a young Willy Wonka and his adventures prior to opening the world's most famous chocolate factory, titled Wonka, was directed by Paul King and produced by David Heyman. Timothée Chalamet portrays young Willy Wonka in the film. The film is an original story that depicts a younger, hopeful Wonka throughout his early days as a chocolatier.

The film was released in cinemas on 15 December 2023, received positive reviews from critics and grossed approximately US$632 million worldwide. For his performance, Chalamet was nominated for a Golden Globe Award for Best Actor in a Motion Picture – Musical or Comedy.

=== Charlie vs. the Chocolate Factory (2027) ===
Charlie vs. the Chocolate Factory is an upcoming 2027 animated musical comedy film starring Kit Connor playing a new character, Charlie Paley, and Taika Waititi as Willy Wonka. Animated by Sony Pictures Imageworks, it is the latest entry in the Charlie and the Chocolate Factory franchise after the 2021 Netflix acquisition of the Roald Dahl Story Company. The film is set to be released in theaters in the United States and United Kingdom on November 5, 2027, and internationally by Sony Pictures Releasing International, and later on Netflix on December 22.

== Television ==
=== Wonka's The Golden Ticket (2026) ===
A reality game show based on the book called Wonka's The Golden Ticket was released by Netflix in 2026. The show sees twelve pairs enter the chocolate factory and compete in a series of games. The show features the voice of Gene Wilder, recreated with AI with the blessing of his wife.

=== Charlie and the Chocolate Factory animated series ===
An animated series adaptation of the novel is in development by Netflix and Mikros Animation. Taika Waititi is attached to direct, write, and executive produce the series. Another series revolving Oompa-Loompa characters is also in development.

== Stage ==
=== Roald Dahl's Willy Wonka (2004) ===
Roald Dahl's Willy Wonka is a musical that combines elements of both Dahl's book Charlie and the Chocolate Factory and of the 1971 film Willy Wonka and the Chocolate Factory with newly created material. The musical has several versions: the original version which premiered in 2004, the Junior version, the Kids version, and the Theatre for Young Audience version. All are owned by Music Theatre International, the company that owns the Willy Wonka licence.

=== The Golden Ticket (2010) ===
The Estate of Roald Dahl sanctioned an operatic adaptation called The Golden Ticket, written by the composer Peter Ash and the librettist Donald Sturrock. The Golden Ticket has completely original music and was commissioned by the American Lyric Theater, Lawrence Edelson (producing artistic director), and Felicity Dahl. The opera received its world premiere at Opera Theatre of Saint Louis on 13 June 2010, in a co-production with American Lyric Theater and Wexford Festival Opera.

=== Charlie and the Chocolate Factory (2013) ===
A musical based on the novel, titled Charlie and the Chocolate Factory, premiered at the West End's Theatre Royal, Drury Lane, in May 2013 and officially opened on 25 June. The show is directed by Sam Mendes, with new songs by Marc Shaiman and Scott Wittman, and stars Douglas Hodge as Willy Wonka. The production broke records for weekly ticket sales. Coincidentally, Hodge was also the voice of a Charlie and the Chocolate Factory audiobook, as part of a package of Roald Dahl CDs read by celebrities.

== Video games ==
There are three Charlie and the Chocolate Factory video games, one made in 1985, one in 2005, and another in 2012. The former is based on the novel of the same name, the centre is based on the 2005 film adaptation, and the latter is based on the 1971 film adaptation.

=== Poptropica: Charlie and the Chocolate Factory Island (2012–present) ===
Since 2012 the online role-playing video game Poptropica by Jeff Kinney has featured a "Charlie and the Chocolate Factory Island" as one of the game's "islands", in which the player must problem-solve through game quest scenarios, centring on a problem that the player must resolve by going through multiple obstacles, collecting and using items, talking to various characters, and completing goals, serving as a video game adaptation of the 1971 film Willy Wonka & the Chocolate Factory.

== Attractions ==
=== Charlie and the Chocolate Factory: The Ride ===
Charlie and the Chocolate Factory: The Ride was a dark ride located in the Cloud Cuckoo Land area of Alton Towers theme park, Staffordshire, England. Opened in 2006, it was based upon the book, and took its thematic inspiration from the illustrations of Quentin Blake. The ride was split into two segments, the first being a boat ride along the chocolate river inside Willy Wonka's Chocolate Factory. Passengers encountered all the characters from the book either as simple animatronics or computer-generated projections. After disembarking the boats, the second segment began with a short pre-show video (involving Mike Teevee). The video was presented as if the viewers are actually trapped within the TV set. The ride continued inside one of two 'Great Glass Elevators' which simulated passengers taking an airborne trip through the rest of the factory. Each elevator was a static room with semi-translucent walls and ceiling on which CGI animations were projected from the outside, and only the floor trembles slightly to give the impression of movement. The attraction closed in 2015.

=== Willy's Chocolate Experience ===
An unlicensed attraction, "Willy's Chocolate Experience", opened on 24 February 2024 in Glasgow, and closed the same day. The event was advertised using AI-generated artwork and promised features such as "an enchanted garden, an Imagination Lab, a Twilight Tunnel, and captivating entertainment", although, when guests arrived, they were met instead with a poorly and cheaply decorated chocolate factory in a mostly empty warehouse. The event spawned many internet memes, and featured factory tours offered by several actors playing Willy Wonka, that involved a story in which Wonka would defeat an "evil chocolate maker who lives in the walls" called "The Unknown". According to Paul Connell, who portrayed Willy Wonka in the tours, his script contained "15 pages of AI-generated gibberish". Despite the high entrance fee and promised chocolate theme of the event, guests were only given a single jellybean and a cup of lemonade. The misleading advertisements led to law enforcement being called to the event shortly prior to it being shut down.

== Cast and crew ==
=== Principal cast ===
List indicators

This section includes characters who have appeared in the franchise in major or notable roles.

- An empty grey cell indicates the character was not in the film.
- ^{U} indicates an uncredited appearance.
- ^{V} indicates a voice-only role.
- ^{Y} indicates a younger version of the character.

Character	Films				Musicals	
Character	Willy Wonka & the Chocolate Factory	Charlie and the Chocolate Factory	Tom and Jerry: Willy Wonka and the Chocolate Factory	Wonka	Charlie and the Chocolate Factory (West End)	Charlie and the Chocolate Factory (Broadway)
Willy Wonka	Gene Wilder	Johnny Depp Blair Dunlop^{Y}	J. P. Karliak	Timothée Chalamet Colin O'Brien^{Y}	Douglas Hodge	Christian Borle
Charlie Bucket	Peter Ostrum	Freddie Highmore	Lincoln Melcher		Jack Costello; Tom Klenerman; Isaac Rouse; Louis Suc	Jake Ryan Flynn; Ryan Foust; Ryan Sell
Grandpa Joe	Jack Albertson	David Kelly	Jess Harnell		Nigel Planer	John Rubinstein
Oompa-Loompas	Rusty Goffe; Rudy Borgstaller; George Claydon; Malcom Dixon; Ismed Hassan; Norma McGlen; Angelo Muscat; Pepe Poupee; Marcus Powell; Albert Wilkinson	Deep Roy	Kath Soucie (Tuffy)	Hugh Grant (Lofty)	Ensemble	Ensemble
Augustus Gloop	Michael Böllner	Philip Wiegratz	Rachel Butera		Harrison Slater; Jenson Steele; Regan Stokes	F. Michael Haynie
Violet Beauregarde	Denise Nickerson	AnnaSophia Robb	Dallas Lovato		India Ria Amarteifio; Adrianna Bertola; Jade Johnson; Mya Olaye	Trista Dollison
Veruca Salt	Julie Dawn Cole	Julia Winter	Emily O'Brien		Polly Allen; Tia Noakes; Ellie Simons	Emma Pfaeffle
Mike Teavee	Paris Themmen	Jordan Fry	Lauren Weisman		Jay Heyman; Adam Mitchell; Luca Toomey	Michael Wartella
Grandma Josephine	Franziska Liebing	Eileen Essell	Uncredited voice actress		Roni Page	Kristy Cates
Grandma Georgina	Dora Altmann	Liz Smith	Uncredited voice actress		Myra Sands	Madeleine Doherty
Grandpa George	Ernst Ziegler	David Morris	Uncredited voice actress		Billy Boyle	Paul Slade Smith
Mr. Salt	Roy Kinnear	James Fox	Sean Schemmel		Clive Carter	Ben Crawford
Mrs. Salt	Pat Coombs	Francesca Hunt				
Mr. Teavee	Michael Goodliffe	Adam Godley				
Mrs. Teavee	Dodo Denney	Francesca Albini	Lori Alan		Iris Roberts	Jackie Hoffman
Mr. Gloop	Kurt Großkurth	Harry Taylor				
Mrs. Gloop	Ursula Reit	Franziska Troegner	Audrey Wasilewski		Jasna Irvir	Kathy Fitzgerald
Mrs. Bucket	Diana Sowle	Helena Bonham Carter	Kate Higgins		Alex Clatworthy	Emily Padgett
Bill / Candy Store Clerk	Aubrey Woods	Oscar James	Jess Harnell			
Sam Beauregarde	Leonard Stone		Jess Harnell		Paul J. Medford	Alan H. Green
Mr. Wilkinson "Arthur Slugworth"	Günter Meisner		Mick Wingert			
Mr. Turkentine	David Battley		Sean Schemmel			
Mrs. Beauregarde	Harriet Rosalind^{V}^{U}	Missi Pyle				
Winkelmann	Peter Stuart					
Arthur Slugworth		Phil Philmar		Paterson Joseph		
Dr. Wilbur Wonka		Christopher Lee				
Mr. Bucket		Noah Taylor			Jack Shalloo	
Fickelgruber		Tony Kirwood		Mathew Baynton		
Prodnose		Chris Cresswell		Matt Lucas		
Noodle				Calah Lane		
Abacus Crunch				Jim Carter		
Piper Benz				Natasha Rothwell		
Larry Chucklesworth				Rich Fulcher		
Lottie Bell				Rakhee Thakrar		
Chief of Police				Keegan-Michael Key		
Officer Affable				Kobna Holdbrook-Smith		
Mrs. Scrubit				Olivia Colman		
Bleacher				Tom Davis		
Father Julius				Rowan Atkinson		

=== Crew ===
Role	Film			
Role	Willy Wonka & the Chocolate Factory	Charlie and the Chocolate Factory	Tom and Jerry: Willy Wonka and the Chocolate Factory	Wonka
Role	1971	2005	2017	2023
Director(s)	Mel Stuart	Tim Burton	Spike Brandt	Paul King
Producer(s)	Stan Margulies; David L. Wolper	Brad Grey; Richard D. Zanuck	Spike Brandt; Tony Cervone	David Heyman; Luke Kelly; Alexandra Derbyshire
Writer(s)	Roald Dahl; David Seltzer^{U}	John August	Gene Grillo	Simon Farnaby; Paul King
Composer(s)	Leslie Bricusse; Anthony Newley	Danny Elfman	Michael Tavera; Walter Scharf (original themes); Robby Merkin (musical director)	Joby Talbot Neil Hannon (songs)
Cinematographer(s)	Arthur Ibbetson	Philippe Rousselot	—N/a	Chung Chung-hoon
Editor(s)	David Saxon	Chris Lebenzon	Dave Courter; Philip Malamuth	Mark Everson
Distributor(s)	Paramount Pictures (Note: Paramount originally distributed the film in 1971. After the film rights lapsed in 1977, Paramount declined to renew and they defaulted back to the Quaker Oats Company, which sold them to Warner Bros. Pictures.)	Warner Bros. Pictures	Warner Bros. Pictures	Warner Bros. Pictures

== Reception ==
=== Box office performance ===
Film	U.S. release date	Box office revenue			Budget	Ref(s)
Film	U.S. release date	North America	International	Worldwide	Budget	Ref(s)
Willy Wonka & the Chocolate Factory	June 30, 1971	$4,000,000	$58,143	$4,058,143	$3 million	
Charlie and the Chocolate Factory	July 15, 2005	$206,459,076	$269,366,408	$475,825,484	$150 million	
Wonka	December 15, 2023	$201,034,847	$371,400,000	$572,434,847	$125 million	

=== Critical and public response ===
Film	Rotten Tomatoes	Metacritic	CinemaScore
Willy Wonka & the Chocolate Factory	90% (61 reviews)	67 (10 reviews)	—N/a
Charlie and the Chocolate Factory	83% (229 reviews)	72 (40 reviews)	A−
Wonka	82% (300 reviews)	72 (40 reviews)	A−

=== Academy Awards ===
Award
Award	Willy Wonka & the Chocolate Factory	Charlie and the Chocolate Factory
Original Score	Nominated	
Costume Design		Nominated
