= Wiegratz =

Wiegratz is a surname. Notable people with the surname include:

- Philip Wiegratz (born 1993), German actor
- Warren Wiegratz, American saxophonist
