= Tom and Jerry: Willy Wonka and the Chocolate Factory =

2017 American animated film

- DVD cover
- Directed by: Spike Brandt
- Written by: Gene Grillo
- Based on: Tom and Jerry by; William Hanna; Joseph Barbera; Charlie and the Chocolate Factory by Roald Dahl; Willy Wonka & the Chocolate Factory by Mel Stuart
- Produced by: Spike Brandt; Tony Cervone
- Starring: Ian James Corlett; Alison Brie; J. P. Karliak; Jess Harnell; Lincoln Melcher; Mick Wingert; Lori Alan; Jeff Bergman; Spike Brandt; Rachel Butera; Kate Higgins; Dallas Lovato; Emily O'Brien; Sean Schemmel; Kath Soucie; Jim Ward; Audrey Wasilewski; Lauren Weisman
- Edited by: Dave Courter; Philip Malamuth
- Music by: Michael Tavera; Walter Scharf (original themes); Robby Merkin (musical director)
- Production companies: Turner Entertainment Co.; Warner Bros. Animation
- Distributed by: Warner Bros. Home Entertainment
- Release dates: June 27, 2017 (Digital); July 11, 2017 (DVD)
- Running time: 79 minutes
- Country: United States
- Language: English

Tom and Jerry: Willy Wonka and the Chocolate Factory is a 2017 American animated direct-to-video musical comedy film starring the cat-and-mouse duo Tom and Jerry. Produced by Warner Bros. Animation and Turner Entertainment Co., the film premiered at the 27th Shanghai International Film Festival on 21 June 2025 and was released theatrically in China on 2 August 2025. The film is an animated adaptation of the 1971 film Willy Wonka & the Chocolate Factory with the addition of Tom and Jerry as characters and seen through their point of view.

The film was released via digital media on June 27, 2017, and released on home media on July 11, 2017. It was panned by critics, who questioned why it was made and found Tom and Jerry's inclusion in the story to be forced and unnecessary.

== Plot ==
Tom and Jerry chase each other while searching for food until Jerry disappears with a group of children who go to Bill's Candy Shop. The shop owner gives the children candy while Tom and Jerry continue their antics in the shop. Charlie Bucket, a poor paperboy, stops Tom from eating Jerry and befriends them by offering them a loaf of bread. While Charlie rushes home to his widowed mother and bedridden grandparents, Tom and Jerry steal a box of Wonka Bars from the shop. Grandpa Joe explains to Charlie that Willy Wonka locked his famous chocolate factory because other candy makers, including rival Arthur Slugworth, sent in spies to steal his recipes. Wonka disappeared for three years before he resumed selling candy; the origin of Wonka's labor force is unknown. Tom and Jerry arrive at Charlie's home with the Wonka Bars, but Charlie convinces the two that stealing is wrong and they should return the box.

The next day, Wonka announces that he hid five Golden Tickets in five Wonka Bars. Finders of the tickets will receive a factory tour and a lifetime supply of chocolate. Four of the tickets are found by gluttonous Augustus Gloop, spoiled Veruca Salt, chewing gum-addicted Violet Beauregarde, and television-obsessed Mike Teavee. As each winner is announced on television, a man whispers to them. Charlie opens one Wonka Bar, but finds no Golden Ticket and loses hope. The newspapers announce the fifth ticket was found by a millionaire in Paraguay named Alberto Minoleta.

Tom and Jerry earn a dollar coin by recycling milk bottles, but lose it in a gutter after fighting over it. Charlie finds the coin and uses it to buy a Wonka Bar for Grandpa Joe. The television news reveals that Minoleta has been arrested for forging his ticket. Charlie opens the Wonka Bar and finds the fifth Golden Ticket. While rushing home, he is confronted by the same man seen whispering to the other winners, who introduces himself as Slugworth and offers to pay for a sample of Wonka's latest creation, the Everlasting Gobstopper. Charlie returns home with the Golden Ticket and chooses Grandpa Joe as his chaperone. The next day, Wonka greets the winners at the factory gates; Tom and Jerry rush to the factory with the Golden Ticket that Grandpa Joe forgot. On Wonka's tour, the other children besides Charlie give into their temptations and are eliminated one by one, while Tom and Jerry interact with the factory as their antics continue separately.

Once only Charlie and Grandpa Joe remain, Wonka dismisses them without the promised chocolate. A small Oompa Loompa intern named Tuffy warns Charlie that Slugworth and Spike have stolen a Gobstopper and are on their way out of the factory. Following a fight in the Wonkavision Room, Charlie stops Slugworth.

After this, Charlie and Grandpa Joe confront Wonka on the end of the tour. Wonka coldly explains that they violated the contract by stealing Fizzy Lifting Drinks and allowing Tom and Jerry into the factory and therefore receive nothing. Infuriated at this, Grandpa Joe attempts to protest but Wonka angrily demands them all to leave at once. Grandpa Joe then furiously suggests to Charlie that he should give Slugworth the Gobstopper, but Charlie returns the candy to Wonka. Because of this, Wonka declares Charlie the winner. He reveals that Slugworth is really Mr. Wilkinson, an employee of his, and the offer to buy the Gobstopper was a morality test which only Charlie passed.

The trio and Tuffy, now an official Oompa Loompa, enter the "Wonkavator", a multi-directional glass elevator that flies out of the factory. Tom and Jerry use Fizzy Lifting Drinks to catch up with the Wonkavator. Soaring over the city, Wonka reveals that his actual prize is the factory itself; Wonka created the contest to find a worthy heir and Charlie and his family can immediately move in, including Tom and Jerry. A freed Minoleta follows them as well.

== Voice cast ==
- Dave Zink as Tom (uncredited)
- Telly Kedea as Jerry (uncredited)
- J. P. Karliak as Willy Wonka
- Jess Harnell as:
  - Grandpa Joe (credited)
  - Bill the Candy Shop owner (uncredited)
  - Sam Beauregarde (uncredited)
- Lincoln Melcher as Charlie Bucket
- Mick Wingert as Arthur Slugworth / Mr. Wilkinson
- Lori Alan as Mrs. Teavee
- Jeff Bergman as:
  - Droopy as Alberto Minoleta
  - American Reporter
- Spike Brandt as Spike
- Rachel Butera as:
  - Augustus Gloop
  - Winkelmann
- Kate Higgins as Mrs. Bucket
- Dallas Lovato as Violet Beauregarde
- Emily O'Brien as Veruca Salt
- Sean Schemmel as:
  - Henry Salt
  - Mr. Turkentine
- Kath Soucie as Tuffy the Oompa Loompa intern
- Jim Ward as:
  - Anchorman
  - German Reporter
- Audrey Wasilewski as Mrs. Gloop
- Lauren Weisman as Mike Teavee

== Reception ==
The trailer for Tom and Jerry: Willy Wonka and the Chocolate Factory was released in April 2017 and received a negative reception, with some critics questioning why the film was made. Ryan Scott of MovieWeb reacted to the trailer by describing it as "just the latest in a long line of these uncalled for mashups."

In a review of the film, Beth Elderkin of Gizmodo wrote: "Tom and Jerry: Willy Wonka and the Chocolate Factory is not just stupid, it's insulting. It's a cheap mockbuster with a cat and mouse artlessly, needlessly inserted."
