= Wonka (soundtrack) =

2023 soundtrack album by Neil Hannon and Joby Talbot

Wonka (Original Motion Picture Soundtrack)

Soundtrack album by Neil Hannon (songs) and Joby Talbot (score)
- Released: 8 December 2023
- Recorded: 2021–2023
- Studio: Abbey Road; AIR; Angel
- Genre: Film soundtrack; film score
- Length: 56:31
- Label: WaterTower Music
- Producer: Neil Hannon; Joby Talbot

Joby Talbot chronology
Sing 2: Original Motion Picture Soundtrack (2021)	Wonka (Original Motion Picture Soundtrack) (2023)

Roald Dahl's Charlie and the Chocolate Factory chronology
Charlie and the Chocolate Factory (2005)	Wonka: Original Motion Picture Soundtrack (2023)

Wonka (Original Motion Picture Soundtrack) is the soundtrack to the 2023 musical fantasy film of the same name co-written and directed by Paul King, and co-written by Simon Farnaby. Based on the origin story of Willy Wonka, a character in the 1964 novel Charlie and the Chocolate Factory by Roald Dahl, the film stars Timothée Chalamet in the lead role, with an ensemble cast. The album features seven original songs composed by Neil Hannon and written by King and Farnaby, further accompanied by the cues from the original score composed by Joby Talbot. The songs are performed by the cast members, including Chalamet (in his singing debut). The soundtrack was released by WaterTower Music on 8 December 2023.

== Background ==
Neil Hannon, frontman of the Divine Comedy, provided seven original songs for the film in his Hollywood debut. The songs were composed in mid-2021 and were recorded at the Abbey Road Studios in London. Joby Talbot scored the incidental music for the film which was recorded at the Abbey Road and Air Studios in May 2023. The soundtrack also featured Leslie Bricusse and Anthony Newley's "Pure Imagination" and "Oompa Loompa" from Willy Wonka & the Chocolate Factory (1971).

Wonka marked Chalamet's debut as a singer on-screen, who said he felt "out of his league" recording at Abbey Road. King's casting of Chalamet was attributed to his musical theatre performances at high school, which he found on YouTube having thousands of views, knowing that he could sing and dance really well. King, who appreciated Chalamet's singing voice, called it reminiscent of Bing Crosby; in an interview in The Hollywood Reporter, he said, "There's quite a range because it does go from a couple of bigger, showstopper-y sort of things, to moments of real, pure emotion, and he can do it all... I'm going to sound like a crazed fan."

== Release ==
Although the full track list was not revealed, in November 2023, Warner Bros. submitted the original song "A World of Your Own" performed by Chalamet, composed by Hannon and written by King and Farnaby, as a contender for the Academy Award for Best Original Song at the 96th Academy Awards. On 14 November 2023, a sneak peek of Chalamet singing "Pure Imagination" from the 1971 film was released, further revealing that it would be featured in the film and the album. The soundtrack was released by WaterTower Music on 8 December 2023, a week prior to the United States release. The album is planned to be released on CD and vinyl in 2024.

== Reception ==
Ross Bonaime of Collider wrote "Music was key to bringing Willy Wonka to the screen in 1971, and while the songs here aren't quite to the level of that original film, they are toe-tapping fun in the theater and Hannon does a solid job with the musical numbers throughout." David Rooney of The Hollywood Reporter called Neil Hannon's musical numbers being "serviceable" but "there's little of the sophisticated lyrical wit of the Northern Irish orchestral pop band's best work" with the catchiest being "A World of Your Own"; he reviewed Talbot's score as "playful" and "smoothly integrated with the songs". Tim Grierson of Screen International wrote that Talbot's "wistful score cannily weaves in trace elements of" the track "Pure Imagination" from the 1971 film connecting the prequel. Also opining the same, Entertainment Weekly critic Mauren Lee Lenker also addressed that the first film's "Pure Imagination" and "Oompa Loompa" are the "best musical moments from the film". Julian Roman of MovieWeb wrote "Kudos to composer Joby Talbot (Sing franchise) and songwriter Neil Hannon, from Irish band The Divine Comedy, for a swinging soundtrack [...] The music wisely hearkens back to the styling of Mel Stuart's Willy Wonka & the Chocolate Factory. The songs aren't edgy and dark like Tim Burton's 2005 adaptation."

== Track listing ==
Wonka (Original Motion Picture Soundtrack) track listing
No.	Title	Lyrics	Music	Artist(s)	Length
1.	"Pure Imagination" (opening titles version)		Leslie Bricusse; Anthony Newley; Joby Talbot	Joby Talbot	1:05
2.	"A Hatful of Dreams"	Neil Hannon; Simon Farnaby; Paul King	Neil Hannon	Timothée Chalamet; Cast of Wonka	4:27
3.	"Welcome to Scrubbit's"		Joby Talbot; Hannon	Talbot	3:16
4.	"You've Never Had Chocolate Like This (Hoverchocs)"	Hannon; Farnaby; King	Hannon	Chalamet	1:13
5.	"Flying Chocolatiers"		Talbot; Hannon	Talbot	1:27
6.	"Scrub Scrub"	Hannon; Farnaby; King	Hannon	Cast of Wonka	1:50
7.	"Wonka's Case"		Talbot; Hannon	Talbot	3:05
8.	"Sweet Tooth"		Hannon	Paterson Joseph; Matt Lucas; Mathew Baynton; Keegan-Michael Key	2:10
9.	"Willy and Noodle at the Zoo"		Talbot; Hannon	Talbot	2:26
10.	"For a Moment"		Hannon	Calah Lane; Chalamet	3:22
11.	"The Letter 'A'"		Talbot; Hannon	Talbot	1:37
12.	"Clock Tower"		Talbot; Hannon	Talbot	0:49
13.	"You've Never Had Chocolate Like This"	Hannon; Farnaby; King	Hannon	Chalamet; Cast of Wonka	3:49
14.	"Oompa Loompa"		Bricusse; Newley	Hugh Grant; Chalamet	1:05
15.	"A World of Your Own"	Hannon; Farnaby; King	Hannon	Chalamet; Cast of Wonka	3:42
16.	"Sorry, Noodle"		Hannon	Chalamet	1:28
17.	"Mamma's Secret"		Talbot; Hannon	Talbot	2:42
18.	"Pure Imagination" (from Wonka)		Bricusse; Newley; Talbot	Chalamet	3:08
19.	"Oompa Loompa (Reprise)"		Bricusse; Newley	Grant	1:05
20.	"500 Monks, 1 Giraffe"		Talbot; Hannon	Talbot	4:24
21.	"Death by Chocolate"		Talbot; Hannon	Talbot	4:20
22.	"The Oompa Loompa to the Rescue"		Bricusse; Newley; Talbot	Talbot	1:22
23.	"Noodle Gives Affable the Ledger"		Talbot; Hannon	Talbot	1:28
24.	"Chocolate Fountain"		Talbot; Hannon	Talbot	1:11
Total length:					56:31

- "Pure Imagination" (opening titles version) contains an interpolation of "Pure Imagination" written by Leslie Bricusse and Anthony Newley.
- "The Oompa Loompa to the Rescue" contains an interpolation of "Oompa Loompa" written by Leslie Bricusse and Anthony Newley.

== Charts ==
Weekly chart performance for Wonka (Original Motion Picture Soundtrack)
Chart (2023–2024)	Peak position
Belgian Albums (Ultratop Flanders)	53
Belgian Albums (Ultratop Wallonia)	182
Dutch Albums (Album Top 100)	53
Japanese Digital Albums (Oricon)	48
UK Compilation Albums (OCC)	1
UK Soundtrack Albums (OCC)	4
US Soundtrack Albums (Billboard)	18

You've Never Had Chocolate Like This reached 78 on the UK Official Chart.

== Accolades ==
Award	Date of ceremony	Category	Recipient(s)	Result	Ref.
Hollywood Music in Media Awards	15 November 2023	Original Song — Sci-Fi/Fantasy Film	Neil Hannon, Simon Farnaby, and Paul King ("A World of Your Own")	Nominated	
Hollywood Music in Media Awards	15 November 2023	Original Song — Sci-Fi/Fantasy Film	Neil Hannon, Simon Farnaby, and Paul King ("You've Never Had Chocolate Like This")	Nominated	
Hollywood Music in Media Awards	15 November 2023	Best Song – Onscreen Performance (Film)	Timothée Chalamet ("A World of Your Own")	Nominated	
