= Charlie and the Chocolate Factory (1985 video game) =

Video game developed by Soft Option

- Developer: Soft Option
- Publisher: Hill MacGibbon
- Platform: ZX Spectrum
- Release: UK: 1985
- Mode: Single-player

Charlie and the Chocolate Factory is a 1985 video game developed by British studio Soft Option and published by Hill MacGibbon. It was released in the United Kingdom for the ZX Spectrum. It is loosely based on Roald Dahl's 1964 book of the same name, and consumers had the option of buying the game and book as a set.

== Gameplay ==
Charlie and the Chocolate Factory is loosely based on the book of the same name. The game includes four different single-screen games based on characters from the book. A fifth game, an arcade adventure, is also playable. In the first of the four games, the player must guide Augustus Gloop around a maze. In the second game, Violet Beauregarde is being attacked by blueberries and must deflect them into a juicing machine. In the third game, Veruca Salt is being attacked by squirrels after enraging them, and she must leave behind poisoned nuts as a defense, although the poison has a limited lifespan. In the fourth game, Mike Teavee travels across multiple floors trying to collect Wonka Bars, while also avoiding cameras that attack with a shrinking ray.

The arcade adventure takes place in Willy Wonka's 43-room chocolate factory. Playing as Charlie, the player must traverse the factory in search of six gold keys, which will allow the player to enter the Great Glass Lift and win the game. The player must complete each of the four games in order to win the arcade adventure. However, the latter game is still playable in practice mode without completing the four others. The golden keys are absent from the arcade adventure game in practice mode, preventing the player from completing it.

== Reception ==
Reception

Review scores
Publication	Score
Crash	63%
Sinclair User	3/5
Home Computing Weekly	2/5
Sinclair Programs	53%
Your Computer	3/5
Your Spectrum	2/5
ZX Computing	4/5

The graphics were criticized by some reviewers who described them as outdated and flickery. Reviewers for Crash were disappointed with the game. Some critics believed that the game was misleadingly advertised as having four distinct games. Computer Gamer wrote that "when you load side one of the tape, there is only one program on there, not four. So what you are really getting is a single game with four screens." Home Computing Weekly wrote, "The four arcade games on side one of the tape actually load as a single 48K block of code, so what you really get is a single game with four screens and none of them are particularly interesting".

Computer Gamer found each of the four games boring. ZX Computing stated that the four games "are all reasonable and provide good though not very sophisticated entertainment. They are quite difficult to master". Sinclair Programs wrote that the games were difficult, held no long term appeal, and failed to capture "the anarchic humour of the book." Home Computing Weekly wrote that the arcade adventure "is somewhat better, though that's not really saying much." Critics compared the arcade adventure portion to Jet Set Willy, and Manic Miner.

Clare Edgely of Sinclair User wrote that the game "palls after a very short time. However, as the package comprises five games and the book it must represent reasonable value for money." Popular Computing Weekly wrote, "If you think of Charlie and the Chocolate Factory, not as anything dramatically wonderful or original, but as five reasonable arcade games for £9.95 it's rather good." Other critics considered the game to be overpriced. Home Computing Weekly concluded, "Even with the four screens on side one taken into account this 'multi-screen adventure' simply does not justify its high cost."

Computer Gamer liked the idea of getting children interested in books through computer games. The magazine opined that the effort was done poorly, stating that the game "just doesn't do justice to the book." Other critics found the game forgettable and recommended the book instead as a superior choice. Robin Candy of Crash later wrote that Charlie and the Chocolate Factory "relates only vaguely to the book and film, and the licence is little more than a way to sell an unsatisfying game."
