= Everlasting Gobstopper =

Fictional candy from Charlie and the Chocolate Factory

- Charlie and the Chocolate Factory element
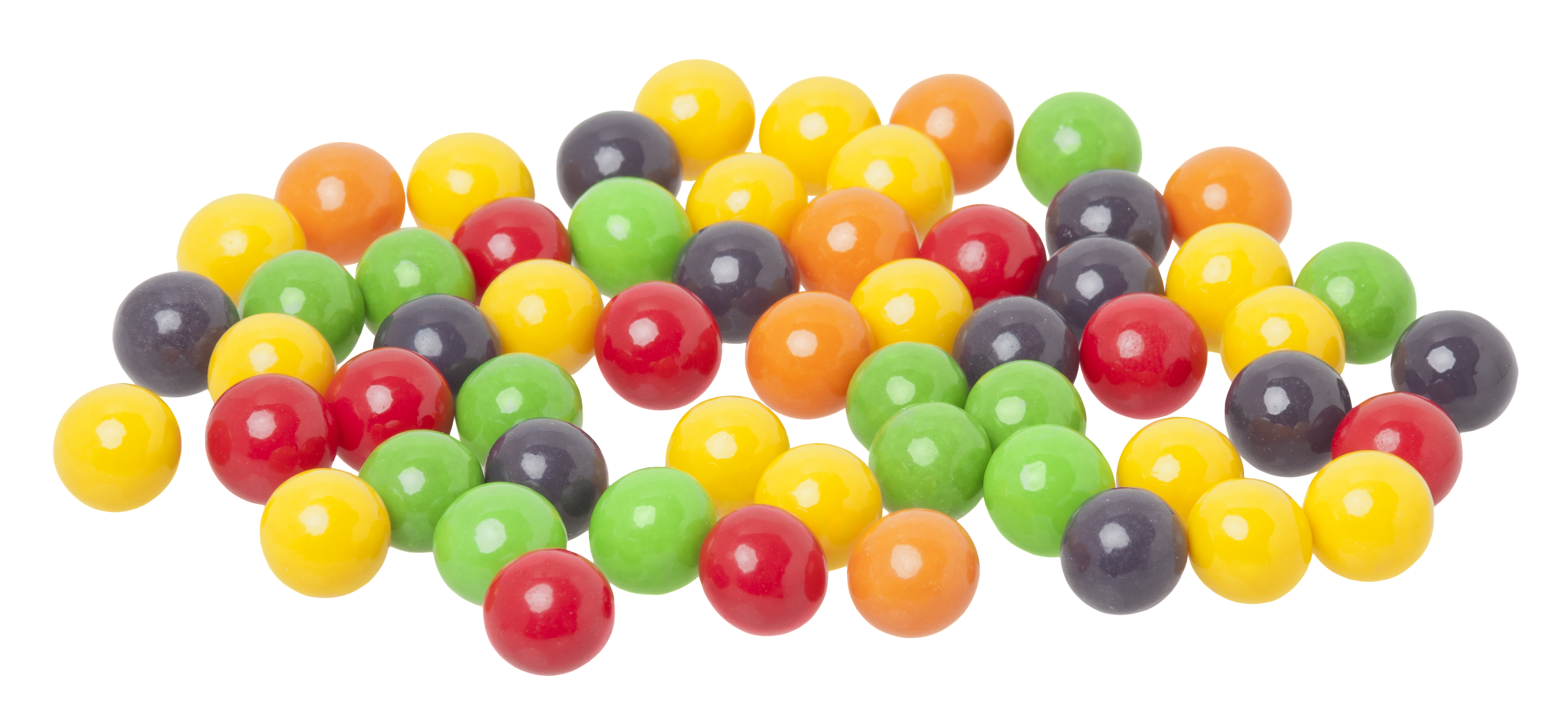
- Multi coloured Everlasting Gobstoppers from The Willy Wonka Candy Company
- First appearance: Charlie and the Chocolate Factory; 1964
- Created by: Roald Dahl
- Genre: Fantasy

In-universe information
- Type: Gobstopper candy
- Affiliation: Willy Wonka

The Everlasting Gobstopper is a gobstopper candy from Roald Dahl's 1964 children's novel Charlie and the Chocolate Factory. According to its creator Willy Wonka, it was intended "for children with very little pocket money". It changes colours and flavours when sucked on and never shrinks in size. In 1976, the name of the fictional candy was used for a product similar to a normal gobstopper, or jawbreaker.

Although only briefly mentioned in the book and its 2005 film adaptation, the 1971 film adaptation Willy Wonka & the Chocolate Factory used the Everlasting Gobstopper as a plot device in which Wonka's business rival Slugworth attempts to bribe the children visiting the Wonka factory to steal one for him. This is later revealed as a lie; Slugworth is actually Mr Wilkinson, one of Wonka's workers. The proposal is a test Wonka set up to judge the worthiness of the ticket holders to take over the factory, given to all five children.

An actual Everlasting Gobstopper prop used in the 1971 film was sold for $US100,000 to the owners of the television show Pawn Stars.

== Nestlé Everlasting Gobstopper ==
Colours of layers of Nestlé Everlasting Gobstoppers
Outer	Middle	Inner
Orange (orange fruit)	Yellow (lemon)	Pink (watermelon)
Red (cherry)	Orange (orange fruit)	Pink (watermelon)
Yellow (lemon)	Orange (orange fruit)	Pink (watermelon)
Green (watermelon)	Yellow (lemon)	Pink (watermelon)
Purple (grape)	Red (cherry)	Pink (watermelon)

A product called the Forever lasting Gobstopper was introduced in 1976 by the Chicago candy company Breaker Confections. Breaker Confections had licensed the "Willy Wonka" name in 1971 so that their candy could be used as merchandising tie-ins for the film Willy Wonka & the Chocolate Factory, which was released the same year. The Willy Wonka Candy Company brand was later bought by Nestlé, and production has been moved to Itasca, Illinois, US.

The everlasting gobstopper is like a normal gobstopper or jawbreaker and is composed of several discrete layers. The layers allow for the colour and flavour changing effects described in the book. They are available in a variety of different flavour combinations and usually have a chalky centre with a cherry flavour. A version with a chewy centre is also available.

The everlasting gobstopper product resembles the gobstopper from the book and its 2005 film adaptation far more than the ones in the 1971 film. The versions from the 1971 film are a multi-coloured, bumpy, spiky candy, while ones in the book and the 2005 film are round, single-coloured spheres.

Seasonal variants such as "Gobstopper Snowballs" and "Gobstopper Heart-breakers" are available during winter holidays and around the time of Valentine's Day, respectively. An example is the Gobstopper Candy Cane, which is the company's only non-spherical Gobstopper: the product is modelled after the regular candy canes that are popular during the Christmas season.

== See also ==
- Wonka Bar
