= Charlie and the Chocolate Factory (2005 video game) =

Action-adventure game

- Developers: High Voltage Software; ImaginEngine (PC); Digital Eclipse (GBA)
- Publisher: 2K Games (Note: Publishing duties were initially delegated to Take-Two subsidiary Global Star Software before being reallocated to the 2K Games label after its formation in January 2005.)
- Director: Jonathan Krusell
- Producers: William Muehl; Chad Kent
- Designers: Jennifer L. Fassett; Duncan McPherson; Kyle Miller
- Programmers: Michael Wilford; Terry Wellman; Peter G. Lewis; Geoff Haines; Justin Crouch
- Artist: Joe Harmell
- Writer: Sean Lynn
- Composer: Winifred Phillips
- Platforms: Game Boy Advance; GameCube; PlayStation 2; Windows; Xbox
- Release: NA: 15 July 2005; NA: 22 July 2005 (GC); EU: 22 July 2005; AU: 26 August 2005
- Genres: Action-adventure, platform
- Mode: Single-player

Charlie and the Chocolate Factory is a 2005 video game which was released on the Game Boy Advance, GameCube, PlayStation 2, Windows and Xbox platforms. It is based on the film of the same name by Tim Burton. The game was released on the same day of the film's theatrical release in the US.

Most of the main cast from the film provided their voices for the game except for Johnny Depp as James Arnold Taylor was used in his place as the voice of Willy Wonka. Original music for the video game was created by Winifred Phillips and produced by Winnie Waldron.

== Overview ==
The first objective of the game is to help Charlie find money to buy a Wonka Bar to win a Golden Ticket. This is done at the beginning of the game while giving a tutorial of what controls will be needed during future stages.

The main part of the game takes place in Willy Wonka's chocolate factory where the Oompa Loompas help the player through each level. By giving them commands Charlie finishes each challenge and progresses through the game. Each Oompa Loompa specialises in different tasks, such as harvesting, welding, and electrical work. Candy is scattered throughout the levels and when collected it boosts Charlie's energy.

Each level has the following goals: Charlie must help Willy Wonka remove Augustus Gloop from the pipe above the chocolate river, roll Violet Beauregarde to the Juicing Room and juice her, follow Veruca Salt down the chute and save her from the incinerator, and free Mike Teavee after he shrinks himself by repairing the television-chocolate machine. Throughout the game the Oompa Loompas must help Charlie return the chocolate factory back to normal by fixing the mistakes that the self-indulgent children made, as well as deal with rogue robots.

== Reception ==
Reception

Aggregate score
Aggregator	Score
Metacritic	(Xbox) 39 out of 100 (GC) 39 out of 100 (GBA) 36 out of 100 (PS2) 35 out of 100 (PC) 26 out of 100

Review scores
Publication	Score
1Up.com	D−
Eurogamer	2 out of 10
Game Informer	4.5 out of 10
GameSpot	4 out of 10 (PC) 2.5 out of 10
GameZone	5 out of 10 (Xbox) 4.5 out of 10
IGN	4.5 out of 10
Nintendo Power	(GBA) 3.5 out of 10 (GC) 2.5 out of 10
Official U.S. PlayStation Magazine	0.5 out of 5
Official Xbox Magazine (US)	3.9 out of 10
PC Gamer (US)	22%
Detroit Free Press	1 out of 4
USA Today	4 out of 10

The game received generally negative reviews from critics. Although reviewers praised the game's enjoyable storyline, music and presentation, most felt that the control of the characters on screen was awkward at best and the game was too short. The video game site IGN gave the game an overall rating of 4.5 out of 10 and GameSpot gave it a "poor" rating of 4 out of 10. PC Gamer rated the game a 22%. G4's X-Play gave the Xbox version a 1 out of 5. Nintendo Power also gave the GameCube version a 2.5 out of 10 because of clunky camera control and the reversal of roles.

Detroit Free Press gave the Game Boy Advance version one star out of four and stated, "I like games that involve strategy, but this game has none. You do what the game wants you to do with a just a bit of brain power involved, but no strategy." USA Today gave the game four stars out of ten and stated that "Overall, the game is beautifully created and the environments are bright and lush with color. The voice acting and the musical score are done well but not overdone and there is just enough charm to give this game potential. But design glitches and annoying camera perspectives sabotage the gameplay, which is the most important part of a game and the entire experience ultimately becomes more of a frustration rather than an enjoyment."

== Soundtrack ==
The original musical soundtrack of the Charlie and the Chocolate Factory video game was composed by Winifred Phillips. In his review of the game for IGN, Juan Castro called the music from the game "a really good soundtrack" and elaborated later in the article by writing, "Music sounds moody and atmospheric where it should. Same goes for the oddball tunes within the factory."
