= Blair Dunlop =

English folk musician and actor (born 1992)

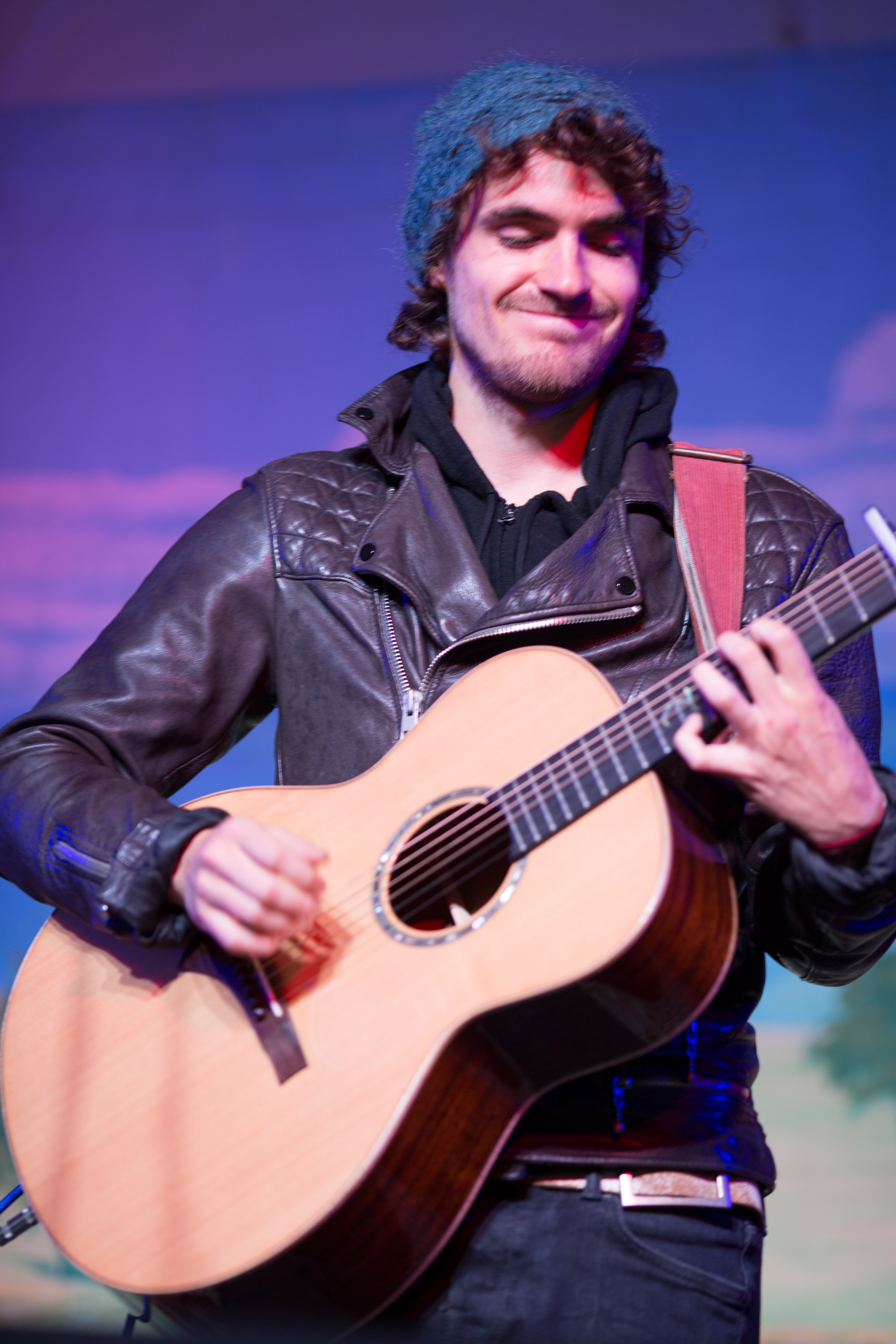
- Dunlop performing in 2014
- Born: 11 February 1992 (age 34); Chesterfield, Derbyshire, England
- Occupations: Actor, musician
- Years active: 2004–present
- Parent(s): Ashley Hutchings and Judy Dunlop
- Website: blairdunlop.com

Blair Dunlop (born 11 February 1992) is an English folk musician and actor.

== Early life and education ==
Dunlop is the son of folk-rock musician Ashley Hutchings (formerly a member of Fairport Convention) and singer Judy Dunlop. He received a scholarship to attend Foremarke Hall in Derbyshire, which he attended from 2003 to 2005 and then moved onto Foremarke Hall’s senior school, Repton School. As a young actor, Dunlop made his film debut with an American accent in Charlie and the Chocolate Factory (2005), directed by Tim Burton. Dunlop played the young Willy Wonka, a child with a burdensome set of orthodontic headgear under strict rule by his father who works as a dental practitioner. Dunlop was also on Rocket Man, a television show in his native UK.

== Professional career ==
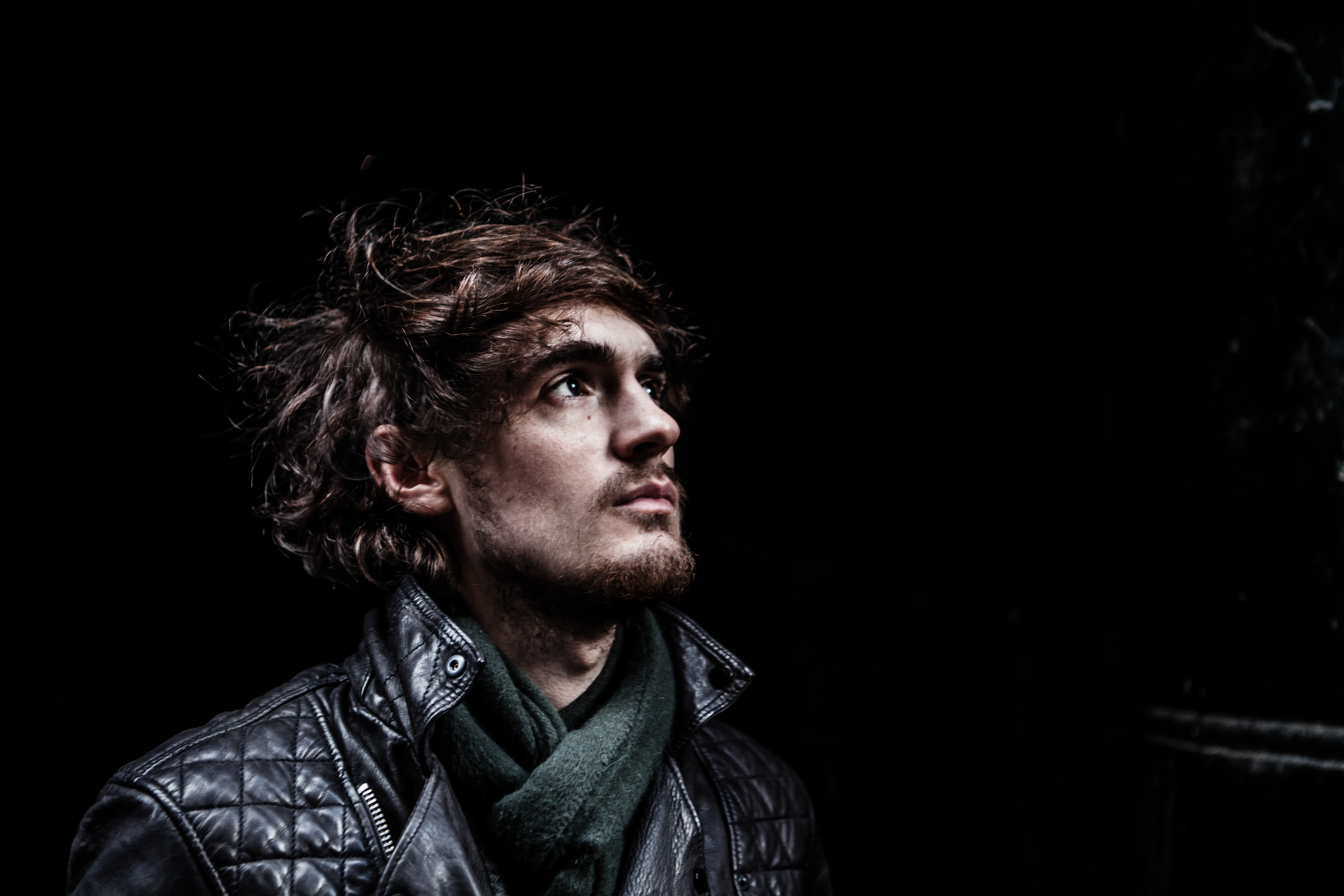
Dunlop in 2013

Blair Dunlop now works as a singer-songwriter and guitarist. He took over the running of The Albion Band from Hutchings in 2011 but folded the band in 2013 to focus on his solo career.

Dunlop has released three EPs and five albums. His first full-length solo album, Blight and Blossom, was released on Rooksmere Records in 2013. Dunlop's second solo album, House of Jacks, was released in May 2014. His third album, Gilded, was released on his own record label Gilded Wings Records on 6 May 2016. This was followed up by the second album on his own label, Notes From An Island, which was released in May 2018. After a six-year gap, Dunlop released his fifth studio album Out Of The Rain, produced by Jim Moray in May 2024.

== Awards ==
Dunlop won the Horizon Award at the 2013 BBC Radio 2 Folk Awards. He also received the Special Jury Prize of the Premio Ciampi in the city of Livorno in Italy in November 2014.

== Discography ==
=== Albums ===
- Blight and Blossom (Rooksmere Records) (2012)
- House of Jacks (Rooksmere Records) (2014)
- Gilded (Gilded Wings Records) (2016)
- Notes From An Island (Gilded Wings Records) (2018)
- Out Of The Rain (Gilded Wings Records) (2024)

=== EPs ===
- Bags Outside The Door EP (Rooksmere Records) (2011)
- Blair Dunlop / Larkin Poe (Rooksmere Records) – 6-track mini-album collaboration with Larkin Poe (2013)
- The Mark Radcliffe Folk Sessions (Delphonic Records) (2013)

=== Other releases ===
- Fighting Room – The Albion Band (mini-album) (2011)
- The Vice Of The People – The Albion Band (album) (2012)
- Orion's Belt – The Albion Band (live album) (2012)
