= Warren Wiegratz =

Warren Wiegratz is a saxophonist who has been named Reed/Brass Instrumentalist of the Year by the Wisconsin Area Music Industry Awards (WAMI) eleven times. Wiegratz is proficient on eight instruments and has been featured in the Saxophone Journal, The Leblanc Bell, and the Roland Users Group magazines.

Currently Wiegratz is the leader of the Milwaukee band, Streetlife. (Streetlife is currently the house band for the Milwaukee Bucks.) Wiegratz was a member of Sweetbottom, with Daryl Stuermer, in 1978 and 79. He formed the smooth jazz group Oceans, which recorded two nationally-released albums, Second Chance (Pro-Jazz) and Ridin' the Tide (Pro-Jazz). He has performed at major jazz festivals across the United States. Wiegratz has performed and recorded with countless renowned national and international artists, including Phil Collins, George Duke, Al Dimeola, Lenny White, The Temptations, Gladys Knight & the Pips, The Supremes, Steve Smith, Jaco Pastorius, Wayman Tisdale, Andy Kim, Lyle Mays, Spencer Brewer, Chris Spheeris, Michael Jones, and Sigmund Snopek III.
