= Charlie and the Chocolate Factory (film) =

2005 film by Tim Burton

- Theatrical release poster
- Directed by: Tim Burton
- Screenplay by: John August
- Based on: Charlie and the Chocolate Factory by Roald Dahl
- Produced by: Brad Grey; Richard D. Zanuck
- Starring: Johnny Depp; Freddie Highmore; David Kelly; Helena Bonham Carter; Noah Taylor; Missi Pyle; James Fox; Deep Roy; Christopher Lee
- Cinematography: Philippe Rousselot
- Edited by: Chris Lebenzon
- Music by: Danny Elfman
- Production companies: Village Roadshow Pictures; The Zanuck Company; Plan B Entertainment; Theobald Film Productions
- Distributed by: Warner Bros. Pictures
- Release dates: July 10, 2005 (Grauman's Chinese Theatre); July 15, 2005 (United States); July 29, 2005 (United Kingdom)
- Running time: 115 minutes
- Countries: United States; United Kingdom; Australia
- Language: English
- Budget: $150 million
- Box office: $475.8 million

Charlie and the Chocolate Factory is a 2005 musical fantasy film directed by Tim Burton and written by John August, based on the 1964 children's novel of the same name by Roald Dahl. The film stars Johnny Depp as Willy Wonka and Freddie Highmore as Charlie Bucket, alongside David Kelly, Helena Bonham Carter, Noah Taylor, Missi Pyle, James Fox, Deep Roy, and Christopher Lee. The storyline follows Charlie as he wins a contest along with four other children and is led by Wonka on a tour of his chocolate factory.

Development for a second adaptation of Charlie and the Chocolate Factory began in 1991, resulting in Warner Bros. Pictures providing the Dahl estate with total artistic control. Prior to Burton's involvement, multiple directors and actors were either in discussion with or considered by the studio to play Wonka. Burton immediately brought regular collaborators Depp and Danny Elfman aboard. Charlie and the Chocolate Factory represents the first musical film directed by Burton and the first time since 1993's The Nightmare Before Christmas that Elfman contributed to a film score using written songs and his vocals.

Filming took place from June to December 2004 at Pinewood Studios in the United Kingdom. Inspired by the book's emphasis on texture, Burton primarily used built sets and practical effects rather than computer-generated environments. Wonka's Chocolate Room was constructed on the 007 Stage at Pinewood, complete with a faux chocolate waterfall and river. Squirrels were trained from birth for Veruca Salt's elimination from the tour. Actor Deep Roy performed each Oompa-Loompa individually rather than one performance duplicated digitally. Burton shot the film simultaneously alongside the stop-motion animated film Corpse Bride, which he also directed.

Willy Wonka-themed chocolate bars were sold, and a Golden Ticket contest was launched as part of the film's marketing campaign. Early plans to promote the film with a Broadway theatre musical were not realized. Charlie and the Chocolate Factory premiered on July 10, 2005, and was released in the United States on July 15 to positive critical reviews, which commended it for its visual appeal and dark tone. It was a box office success, grossing US$475 million and becoming the eighth-highest-grossing film worldwide in 2005. The film received a nomination for Best Costume Design at the 78th Academy Awards, while Depp was nominated for the Golden Globe Award for Best Actor – Musical or Comedy. It is Tim Burton's second-highest-grossing film to date.

== Plot ==
Charlie Bucket is a kind and loving boy who lives in poverty with his family near the Wonka Factory. The company's owner, Willy Wonka, has long closed his factory to the public due to problems concerning industrial espionage, which also caused all his employees, including Charlie's Grandpa Joe, to lose their jobs. Charlie's father, meanwhile, has more recently been laid off from his own job at a toothpaste factory, although he does not admit this to Charlie.

One day, Wonka announces a contest in which Golden Tickets have been placed in five random Wonka Bars worldwide, and the winners will receive a full tour of the factory as well as a lifetime supply of chocolate, while one will receive an additional prize at the end of the tour. Wonka's sales subsequently skyrocket, and the first four tickets are found by the gluttonous Augustus Gloop, the spoiled Veruca Salt, the arrogant, gum-chewing Violet Beauregarde, and the ill-tempered Mike Teavee. Charlie tries twice to find a ticket, but both bars come up empty. After overhearing that the final ticket was found in Russia, Charlie finds a banknote and purchases a third Wonka Bar at the local shop. The Russian ticket is revealed to be a forgery just as Charlie discovers the real ticket inside the wrapper. He receives monetary offers for the ticket, but the cashier warns him not to trade it regardless, and Charlie runs back home. At home, Charlie initially wants to trade the ticket for money for his family's betterment, but after a pep talk from Grandpa George, he decides to keep it, and brings Grandpa Joe to accompany him on the tour.

Charlie and the other ticket holders are greeted outside the factory by Wonka, who then leads them into the facility. Individual character flaws cause the other four children to give in to temptation, resulting in their elimination from the tour while Wonka's new employees, the Oompa-Loompas, sing a song of morality after each. Meanwhile, Wonka reminisces on his troubled past and how his dentist father, Wilbur, strictly forbade him from consuming any candy. After sneaking a piece of candy, Wonka instantly became hooked and ran away from home to follow his dreams. When he returned, however, both his father and their house were gone.

After the tour, the four eliminated children leave the factory with an exaggerated characteristic or deformity related to their elimination, while Charlie learns that Wonka, now approaching retirement, intended to find a worthy heir. Since Charlie was the least ill-behaved of the five, Wonka invites Charlie to come live and work in the factory with him, provided that he leave his family behind. Charlie declines, as his family is the most important thing in his life.

As Charlie and his family's life improve, Wonka becomes despondent, causing his company and sales to decline. He eventually turns to Charlie for advice, and he decides to help Wonka reconcile with his estranged father, Wilbur. During the reunion, Charlie notices newspaper clippings of Wonka's success which Wilbur collected, while Wonka realizes the value of family as he and Wilbur finally reconcile. Afterwards, Wonka allows Charlie and his family to move into the factory together.

== Cast ==
- Johnny Depp as Willy Wonka
  - Blair Dunlop as Young Willy Wonka
- Freddie Highmore as Charlie Bucket
- David Kelly as Grandpa Joe
- Helena Bonham Carter as Mrs. Bucket
- Noah Taylor as Mr. Bucket
- Missi Pyle as Mrs. Beauregarde
- James Fox as Mr. Salt
- Deep Roy as the Oompa-Loompas (with vocal work by Danny Elfman)
- Christopher Lee as Dr. Wonka
- Adam Godley as Mr. Teavee
- Franziska Troegner as Mrs. Gloop
- AnnaSophia Robb as Violet Beauregarde
- Julia Winter as Veruca Salt
- Jordan Fry as Mike Teavee
- Philip Wiegratz as Augustus Gloop
- Liz Smith as Grandma Georgina
- Eileen Essell as Grandma Josephine
- David Morris as Grandpa George
- Nitin Ganatra as Prince Pondicherry
- Shelley Conn as Princess Pondicherry
- Geoffrey Holder as Narrator

== Production ==
=== Development ===
Author Roald Dahl disapproved of the 1971 film adaptation. Warner Bros. Pictures and Brillstein-Grey Entertainment entered into discussions with the Dahl estate in 1991, hoping to purchase the rights to produce another film version of Charlie and the Chocolate Factory. The purchase was finalized in 1998, with Dahl's widow, Felicity ("Liccy"), and daughter, Lucy, receiving total artistic control and final privilege on the choices of actors, directors and writers. The Dahl estate's subsequent protection of the source material was the main reason that Charlie and the Chocolate Factory had languished in development hell since the 1990s.

Ang Lee, Terry Gilliam, Anthony Minghella, and Spike Jonze were among the Dahl estate's preferred directors for the project. Scott Frank was hired to write the screenplay in February 1999, after approaching Warner Bros. for the job. Frank, a recent Oscar-nominee for the R-rated crime film Out of Sight (1998), wanted to work on a film that his children could enjoy. As an enthusiastic fan of the book, he intended to remain more faithful to Dahl's vision than the 1971 film had been. Nicolas Cage was under discussions for Willy Wonka, but lost interest. Gary Ross signed to direct in February 2000, which resulted in Frank completing two drafts of the screenplay, before leaving with Ross in September 2001. Both Warner Bros. and the Dahl Estate wanted Frank to stay on the project, but he faced scheduling conflicts and contractual obligations with Minority Report (2002) and The Lookout (2007).

Rob Minkoff entered negotiations to take the director's position in October 2001, and Gwyn Lurie was hired to start from scratch on a new script in February 2002. Lurie said she would adapt the original book and ignore the 1971 film adaptation. Dahl's estate championed Lurie after being impressed with her work on another Dahl adaptation, a live-action adaptation of The BFG, for Paramount Pictures, which was never made. (Note: Paramount distributed the earlier 1971 film version of Charlie, and later sold the rights to Warner Bros.) In April 2002, Martin Scorsese was involved with the film, albeit briefly, but opted to direct The Aviator (2004) instead. Warner Bros. president Alan F. Horn wanted Tom Shadyac to direct Jim Carrey as Willy Wonka, believing the duo could make Charlie and the Chocolate Factory relevant to mainstream audiences, but Liccy Dahl opposed this.

=== Pre-production ===
In May 2003, Warner Bros. announced that Charlie and the Chocolate Factory would be one of their tentpole film releases for 2005. Later that month, Tim Burton was hired to direct after receiving enthusiastic approval from the Dahl estate. Burton compared the project's languishing development to Batman (1989), which he directed, in how there had been varied creative efforts with both films. He said, "Scott Frank's version was the best, probably the clearest, and the most interesting, but they had abandoned that." Liccy Dahl commented that Burton was the first and only director the estate was happy with. He had previously produced another of the author's adaptations with James and the Giant Peach (1996), and, like Roald Dahl, disliked the 1971 film because it strayed from the book's storyline.

As a child, Dahl was the author who I connected to the most. He got the idea of writing a mixture of light and darkness, and not speaking down to kids, and the kind of politically incorrect humor that kids get. I've always liked that, and it's shaped everything I've felt that I've done.

— Tim Burton

During pre-production, Burton visited Dahl's former home in the Buckinghamshire village of Great Missenden. Liccy Dahl remembers Burton entering Dahl's famed writing shed and saying, "This is the Buckets' house!" and thinking to herself, "Thank God, somebody gets it." Liccy also showed Burton the original handwritten manuscripts, which Burton discovered were more politically incorrect than the published book. The manuscripts included a child named Herpes, after the sexually transmitted infection.

Lurie's script received a rewrite by Pamela Pettler, who worked with Burton on Corpse Bride (2005), but the director hired Big Fish screenwriter John August in December 2003 to start from scratch. Both August and Burton were fans of the book since their childhoods. August first read Charlie and the Chocolate Factory when he was eight years old, and subsequently sent Dahl a fan letter. He did not see the 1971 film prior to his hiring, and when asking Burton if he should go back and watch it, August recalled "Tim almost leaped across the table and told me not to." In terms of the screenwriting process, August said "I literally went through the book with a highlighter and I would save even like little bits of scene description as much as I could, just so it would be as Roald Dahl-y as possible." Charlie and the Chocolate Factory took three and a half weeks to write. Burton and August incorporated many parts of the book that were absent from the 1971 film adaptation, including the construction of the Indian Prince's chocolate palace, the inclusion of Charlie's father, and Veruca Salt's attack by squirrels.

Despite their intention to remain close to the source material, Burton and August diverged from the book to explore themes of family, and in doing so unearthed Willy Wonka's origin. "We added new elements that aren't in the book," explained Burton, "but I always felt comfortable that everything was in the spirit of the book." In exploring Wonka's upbringing, Burton and August created the character of Dr. Wilbur Wonka, Willy's domineering father. Burton thought the paternal character would help explain Willy Wonka himself and that otherwise he would be "just a weird guy". This element of the film was also personal for Burton. In 2002, Burton, who was somewhat estranged from his own parents, visited his dying mother in Lake Tahoe and discovered she had framed posters of all his films on her walls; this mirroring a scene towards the end of Charlie where it is revealed Dr. Wonka has been following his son's career with framed newspaper articles on the walls. Burton would later reflect, "I think all artistic endeavors are a way to resolve things, a form of therapy, a fantasy of resolving something. That's why I chose to resolve it that way." The Dahl estate was conflicted about the addition of Wilbur Wonka but ultimately decided to support Burton's vision.

Warner Bros. and the director held differences over the characterizations of Charlie Bucket and Willy Wonka. The studio wanted to entirely delete Mr. Bucket and make Willy Wonka the idyllic father figure Charlie had longed for his entire life. Burton believed that Wonka would not be a good father, finding the character similar to a recluse. Burton said, "In some ways, he's more screwed up than the kids." Warner Bros. also wanted Charlie to be a whiz kid, but Burton resisted the characterization. He wanted Charlie to be an average child who would be in the background and not get in trouble.

=== Casting ===
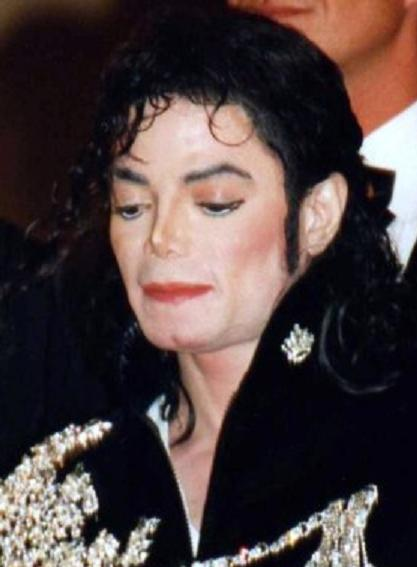
Michael Jackson actively sought the role of Willy Wonka and recorded an entire soundtrack in the hopes that he would be cast. Johnny Depp's performance as Wonka would later receive widespread comparisons to Jackson.

Prior to Burton's involvement, Warner Bros. considered or discussed Willy Wonka with Bill Murray, Christopher Walken, Steve Martin, Robin Williams, Nicolas Cage, Jim Carrey, Michael Keaton, Robert De Niro, Brad Pitt, Will Smith, Mike Myers, Ben Stiller, Leslie Nielsen, three members of Monty Python (John Cleese, Eric Idle, and Michael Palin), as well as Patrick Stewart, and Adam Sandler. (Note: Attributed to multiple references:) Dustin Hoffman and Marilyn Manson reportedly sought the role as well. Pitt's production company, Plan B Entertainment, however, stayed on to co-finance the film with Warner Bros. Michael Jackson actively sought the role and secretly recorded an original soundtrack for the film at a small studio in Los Angeles. Warner Bros. did not want Jackson for the role, arguing that it would not be marketable for him to be the leading role in a family film. However, they "went nuts" over the soundtrack and offered to acquire the songs in exchange for a small role elsewhere in the film. Jackson was upset and shelved the songs.

Johnny Depp was the only actor Burton considered for the role, although Dwayne Johnson was Burton's second choice in case Depp was unavailable. This marked the first time Burton did not face pushback from the studio for wanting to cast Depp, as the blockbuster success of Pirates of the Caribbean (2003) had Warner Bros. enthused about Depp being in the leading role. It was Depp's intention to portray the character in a completely different way from Gene Wilder in the 1971 film adaptation. Depp and Burton derived their Willy Wonka from children's television show hosts such as Bob Keeshan from Captain Kangaroo, Fred Rogers, and Al Lewis from The Uncle Al Show, and Depp also took inspiration from various game show hosts. Burton recalled from his childhood that the characters were bizarre but left lasting impressions, saying, "I used to watch a guy with a sheriff's hat, or a guy who wore a weird leisure suit, or Captain Kangaroo, this guy had a weird haircut and a mustache and sideburns. And you think back and go, 'What the fuck was that?' But they left a strong impression on you." Depp based Wonka's exaggerated bob cut and sunglasses on Vogue magazine editor Anna Wintour. According to Depp, "the hair I imagined as a kind of Prince Valiant do, high bangs and a bob, extreme and very unflattering but something that Wonka probably thinks is cool because he's been locked away for such a long time and doesn't know any better, like the outdated slang he uses." Depp also based Wonka's unique voice on how he imagined George W. Bush sounding like while high on drugs.

The casting calls for Charlie Bucket, Violet Beauregarde, Veruca Salt, and Mike Teavee took place in the United States and United Kingdom, while Augustus Gloop's casting took place in Germany. Burton said he sought actors "who had something of the character in them", and found Mike Teavee the hardest character to cast. Burton was having trouble casting Charlie, until Depp, who had worked with Freddie Highmore on Finding Neverland (2004), suggested Highmore for the part. Highmore had already read the book before, but decided to read it once more prior to auditioning. The actor did not see the original film adaptation, and chose not to see it until after Burton's production, so his portrayal would not be influenced. Before Adam Godley was officially cast as Mr. Teavee, Tim Allen, Ray Romano, and Bob Saget were considered for the role. Gregory Peck was reportedly considered for the role of Grandpa Joe but died before being able to accept the role.

=== Design ===
Production designer Alex McDowell described Charlie and the Chocolate Factory's visual aesthetic as "a collision between psychedelic, inflatable pop art and 1960s Russian-American space race". Tim Burton wanted the setting of the film to be ambiguous in an effort to give the film a fable-like quality similar to the book. McDowell scouted several industrial mill towns in Northern England but came to the conclusion that a real place would not look stylized enough for Burton. "It was back to the Pinewood backlot to start building something that looked grim, wet and depressing on the outside but transitioned believably into a magical kingdom inside." The town, whose design was shaped by the black and white urban photography of Bill Brandt, as well as Pittsburgh and Northern England, is arranged like a medieval village, with Wonka's estate on top and the Bucket shack below. As per the film's ambiguous setting, the cars drive down the middle of the roads. The backlot constructed at Pinewood Studios consisted of the factory courtyard, several streets, nearly fifty townhomes, twenty shops, and the Bucket shack. This town was coincidentally constructed on the same backlot Burton had used for Gotham City in Batman (1989). The Bucket home was inspired by Roald Dahl's famed writing hut, while the exterior of Wonka's factory was based on fascist architecture, with Burton remarking "for Wonka's factory, we kind of wanted a building with a kind of Hoover Dam-like optimism and strength, but then once it gets dark it looks slightly foreboding."

For the set pieces in Wonka's factory, Burton favored using 360 degree enclosed sets because it offered a complete environment and got rid of visitors. The Inventing Room used scrap from the aeronautic industry, defunct confectionery machinery, and old car parts. McDowell compared the design of the Nut Room to that of a hospital with its plastic finish and sterile colors. The crew came up with the layout of the Nut Room fairly quickly, while the color scheme took more time to develop. The Nut Room had to be constructed at an elevation to account for the hole Veruca Salt would have to fall down. The all-white design of the TV Room was adapted directly from the book, though 2001: A Space Odyssey (1968) and THX 1138 (1971) also served as inspirations. The designs of each set would influence the style of music for the Oompa-Loompa songs.

McDowell's design for the Chocolate Room set featured a practical 192,000 US gallons (730,000 L) faux chocolate river.

Willy Wonka's Chocolate Room was built on Pinewood Studios' 007 Stage, one of the largest soundstages in the world. Sections of artificial grass were laid upon blocks of polystyrene foam that formed the shape of the landscape. For the chocolate river, McDowell insisted on having the river look edible, saying "in the first film, it's so distasteful." According to Tim Burton, "the important thing for me was that we wanted to give the chocolate river a really chocolatey feel, give it a weight, not just brown water. That's why we tried to use a real chocolate substitute, to give it a movement and texture." Joss Williams oversaw the creation of a faux chocolate concoction, taking months to create a non-toxic edible substance with the right consistency. The final mixture, developed by a UK-based chemical company called Vickers, was a mix of water and a thickening agent known as Natrosol, with food dye used to achieve the brown coloring. The river was 270 feet (82 m) long, 6 feet (1.8 m) deep, and consisted of 192,000 US gallons (730,000 L) of faux chocolate while 30,000 US gallons (110,000 L) of the same material made up the waterfall. Wonka's boat, used by the characters to travel down the chocolate river, took 20 weeks to build and incorporated 54 animatronic Oompa-Loompas, along with its own internal rowing mechanism.

Colleen Atwood, who served as the costume designer on every live-action Tim Burton film from Ed Wood (1994) to Dumbo (2019), was set to reprise her position on Charlie and the Chocolate Factory but ultimately declined citing "personal reasons". Burton then selected Italian costume designer Gabriella Pescucci. (Note: Pescucci received an Academy Award nomination for her work on Charlie and the Chocolate Factory but would coincidentally lose to Colleen Atwood for Memoirs of a Geisha.) Ten different jackets and overcoats were designed to find the right look for Willy Wonka. Pescucci described the film's wardrobe as "contemporary, but with old world styling". Wonka's latex gloves, which Burton added as a symbol of his detachment from society, were provided by a London-based latex fetish BDSM clothing company.

=== Filming ===
Principal photography for Charlie and the Chocolate Factory started on June 21, 2004. While the main set pieces were filmed on soundstages at Pinewood Studios in England, the crew also shot on several locations across the country, with the toothpaste factory filmed at a CompAir factory in High Wycombe, and Veruca Salt's manor filmed at Hatfield House for the interior shots and Wrotham Park for the exterior. Various establishing shots were filmed in Germany, Yemen, and the United States. Tim Burton shot Charlie and the Chocolate Factory simultaneously alongside Corpse Bride (2005). Composer Danny Elfman, screenwriter John August, and production designer Alex McDowell served in the same position for both movies. Johnny Depp, Helena Bonham Carter, Deep Roy, and Christopher Lee provided their vocals to Corpse Bride during the filming of Charlie.

A miniature town was constructed for exterior shots of the town and factory, as Tim Burton considered buildings difficult to achieve with CGI.

Tim Burton avoided using too many digital effects to reflect the original book's emphasis on texture and because he wanted the younger actors to feel as if they were working in a realistic environment. As a result, forced perspective techniques, oversized props and scale models were used to avoid computer-generated imagery (CGI) wherever possible. Matte paintings were used during the Loompaland and Indian palace sequences. However, several scenes were deemed impossible to achieve realistically without CGI. The Moving Picture Company was tasked with creating entire CG environments for sequences such as the boat ride and the glass elevator tour. A practical method was initially used for Violet Beauregarde's inflation; however, Burton was not satisfied by the effects and decided the scene would be accomplished with CGI. Willy Wonka's pale complexion was achieved in post-production, using Colorfront to isolate Depp's face in each shot and desaturate it.

Deep Roy was cast to play the Oompa-Loompas based on his previous collaborations with Burton on Planet of the Apes (2001) and Big Fish (2003). The actor was able to play various Oompa-Loompas using split screen photography, digital and front projection effects. "Tim told me that the Oompa-Loompas were strictly programmed, like robots—all they do is work, work, work," Roy commented. "So when it comes time to dance, they're like a regiment; they do the same steps." Roy, who played a total of 165 individual Oompa-Loompas in the film, experienced an especially laborious regimen during production. He was required to regularly practice Pilates with a personal trainer and follow a diet in order for his appearance to remain unchanged during filming. With no prior professional dancing experience, each musical number involving Roy took a month to rehearse and six months in total to film. In referencing his workload during production, Burton called Roy the "hardest-working man in show biz".

For Veruca Salt's demise at the hands of a hundred squirrels, Burton wanted the animals to be real. He consulted with the film's animal trainer, Mike Alexander, to determine which parts of the sequence would be achievable with live squirrels. Forty rescue squirrels were trained over 19 weeks, the first three of which were spent making the animals comfortable with their crates and their trainers. The squirrels were then given props and taught how to sit upon a bar stool, tap and then open a walnut, and deposit its meat onto a conveyor belt. According to Alexander, the smartest squirrels were assigned to shell, as those who had difficulty with the regimen were placed in a separate group that ran across the floor and attacked Veruca's stunt double. For the shots where the rodents would be in close interaction with Veruca, CG squirrels designed by Framestore CFC were implemented. Several shots called for a hundred animated squirrels, while close-up models required five million computer-generated hairs to look realistic. Animatronic squirrels were also used in the background of shots where a live squirrel would be performing the shelling routine.

Several challenges emerged during filming. The delicate landscape of the Chocolate Room posed a challenge for the crew, with cinematographer Philippe Rousselot recalling that "the set was very impractical for shooting because it was all curves and extraordinarily fragile—as soon as you stepped onto the grass, you destroyed it." Rousselot instead utilized a cable-suspended camera system known as Cablecam. On one occasion, the camera was improperly secured to the system and subsequently plunged into the faux chocolate river, destroying the $540,000 camera and delaying production. Another hurdle during filming was the existence of British Equity rules, which state that children can only work four and a half hours a day. Filming for Charlie and the Chocolate Factory took six months, ending in December 2004. Despite these challenges, Burton claimed production ended ahead of schedule.

=== Music ===
Charlie and the Chocolate Factory: Original Motion Picture Soundtrack

Soundtrack album / Film score by Danny Elfman
- Released: July 12, 2005
- Studio: Abbey Road Studios
- Genres: Soundtrack album Film score
- Length: 54:14
- Label: Warner Sunset Records
- Producers: Danny Elfman; Tim Burton (exec.); Steve Bartek (co.)

Danny Elfman chronology
Spider-Man 2 (2004)	Charlie and the Chocolate Factory: Original Motion Picture Soundtrack (2005)	Corpse Bride (2005)

Roald Dahl's Charlie and the Chocolate Factory chronology
Willy Wonka & the Chocolate Factory (1971)	Charlie and the Chocolate Factory: Original Motion Picture Soundtrack (2005)	Wonka (2023)

Professional ratings
Review scores
Source	Rating
Film Score Monthly	4/5 stars
Filmtracks.com	3/5 stars
AllMusic	3.5/5 stars
Movie Wave	4/5 stars
ScoreNotes	8/10 stars
Soundtrack.Net	4/5 stars
IGN	7.3/10 stars

Danny Elfman, similar to Tim Burton, had no emotional attachment to 1971's Willy Wonka & the Chocolate Factory. According to Elfman, "I had no trouble divorcing myself from those [original] songs. I've dealt with that a couple of times. You know you're dealing with something that's going to make a lot of people angry, and you just can't think about it." Because the Oompa-Loompa musical numbers would require complex choreography and be shot on set, Elfman had to compose those songs before filming began. Elfman also composed the songs simultaneously alongside the music from Corpse Bride. It was decided at an early stage that Elfman would be providing the vocals for all the Oompa-Loompas, a decision justified by the identical nature of the Oompa-Loompas, with pitch changes and modulations to represent different singers. Charlie and the Chocolate Factory marks the first time since The Nightmare Before Christmas (1993) that Elfman contributed to a film score using written songs and his vocals.

The first song composed was "Augustus Gloop", being done as a Bollywood spectacle per Deep Roy's suggestion. Elfman recounted, "my original approach was to find a style of music and apply that to all the songs. Tim was like, 'No, no, no, no, no... we're going to completely mix it up!' I said, 'Great, let's go.'" Per Burton's suggestion, the Oompa-Loompa songs would each reflect a different style of music: "Violet Beauregarde" is 1970s funk, "Veruca Salt" is 1960s bubblegum and psychedelic pop, and "Mike Teavee" is a tribute to late-1970s hard rock, particularly Queen, and early 1980s hair bands. All four songs utilize lyrics directly from Roald Dahl's book; as such, the lyrics are credited to Dahl. Rather than using the book's songs in their entirety, Elfman selected specific verses, as he believed using them unabridged would have made each song ten minutes long. "Violet Beauregarde" was the only song that required a partial rewrite, as the song in the book was about a girl who chewed gum rather than Violet Beauregarde herself. The only other song to require vocal performances was "Wonka's Welcome Song", which was written in collaboration with the film's screenwriter John August.

In addition to the Oompa-Loompa songs, Elfman created an entire underscore for the film being based around three primary themes: a gentle family theme for the Buckets, generally set in upper woodwinds; a mystical, string-driven waltz for Willy Wonka; and a hyper-upbeat factory theme for full orchestra, Elfman's homemade synthesizer samples and the diminutive chanting voices of the Oompa-Loompas. Elfman and Burton differed on their ideas for the main title music, as Elfman imagined something more dreamy while Burton wanted something energetic. Richard Strauss's Also sprach Zarathustra plays during a sequence in the film as a direct reference to 2001: A Space Odyssey (1968). (Note: The film is also playing in the background of the scene.) When introducing himself to the golden ticket winners, Wonka quotes "Good Morning Starshine" from the 1967 musical Hair.

The original motion picture soundtrack was released on July 12, 2005, by Warner Sunset Records. Doug Adams of Film Score Monthly said of the Oompa-Loompa songs: "Each piece includes something the others don't, rhythms or hooks or harmonies that in Elfman's inimitable way seem like deconstructions and wholly original concepts at the same time." Filmtracks.com called the soundtrack a "rhythmically driven affair" because of the mechanical nature of the factory, a departure from Elfman's penchant for quieter heartbreaking themes. "Wonka's Welcome Song" was honored with a Grammy nomination for Best Song Written for Visual Media. Elfman would later cite Charlie and the Chocolate Factory as being one of the most fun projects he had been involved with.

In 2010, thirteen previously unreleased tracks were included as part of the Danny Elfman & Tim Burton 25th Anniversary Music Box. In addition to those tracks, instrumentals of "Wonka's Welcome Song" and the Oompa-Loompa songs were included, as well as several demos.

== Release ==
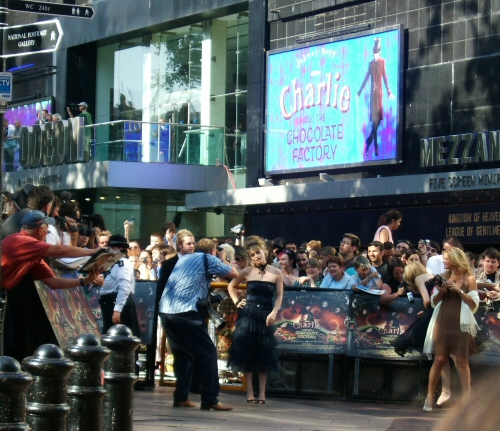
Helena Bonham Carter is photographed at the film's London premiere.

Charlie and the Chocolate Factory had its premiere at the Grauman's Chinese Theatre on July 10, 2005, where money for the Make-a-Wish Foundation was raised. In addition to the film's cast and crew, the Los Angeles premiere was attended by John Stamos, Seth Green, Lisa Rinna, Harry Hamlin, Larry King, Frankie Muniz, Emma Roberts, Limp Bizkit frontman Fred Durst, and Britney Spears. The film was released in the United States on July 15, 2005, in 3,770 theaters. Additionally, the film was digitally re-mastered to simultaneously release in 65 North American IMAX theaters that same day. In the United Kingdom, the premiere was held on July 17 at Leicester Square, only ten days after the July 7 London bombings. It was released nationwide on July 29 in 531 theaters.

The release of Charlie and the Chocolate Factory rekindled public interest in Roald Dahl's 1964 book, which appeared on The New York Times Best Seller list from July 3 to October 23, 2005. Burton's film also reignited interest in the 1971 film adaptation. According to Michael Böllner, who portrayed Augustus Gloop in Willy Wonka & the Chocolate Factory, the first adaptation was largely unheard of in Germany until Burton's version was released.

=== Marketing ===
Early in the development of Charlie and the Chocolate Factory in February 2000, Warner Bros. announced their intention of marketing the film with a Broadway theatre musical after release. The studio reiterated their interest in May 2003; however, the idea was postponed by the time filming began in June 2004. (Note: A Broadway musical adaptation of Charlie and the Chocolate Factory ran from 2017 to 2018.) The teaser poster for Charlie and the Chocolate Factory was released in November 2004, with the teaser trailer premiering the following month in front of showings of The Polar Express (2004). The longer theatrical trailer was made available in May 2005 exclusively via Moviefone before its theatrical debut alongside screenings of Madagascar (2005).

The main tie-in for Charlie and the Chocolate Factory focused on the Willy Wonka Candy Company, a division of Nestlé. A small range of Wonka Bars were launched, utilizing their prominence in the film. Echoing the central storyline of the film, Wonka candies introduced their own Golden Ticket contest in Wonka products, including Wonka Bars, Donutz, Laffy Taffy, Nerds, and SweeTarts. The contest's prizes included a trip to Europe, a tour of an animation studio, a trip to a sports camp, a shopping spree, and $10,000 cash. 60 million packages of candy participated in the sweepstakes. The contest officially began on June 28 following its announcement on the Today Show, and the first winners were announced on July 8. In addition to Nestlé, Hostess introduced Chocolicious WonkaCakes, and Wendy's released Charlie and the Chocolate Factory-themed kids' meal toys. Other partners included Carlson, Penguin Young Readers, Borders, Barnes & Noble, and American Express.

In line with the film's theatrical release in the United States, an eponymous tie-in video game was released on the Xbox, PlayStation 2, GameCube, Game Boy Advance, and Microsoft Windows platforms. The film's cast provided their voices for the game, with the sole exception of Depp who was replaced by James Arnold Taylor. The game garnered mostly negative reviews from critics, although Winifred Phillips's score attracted some praise.

=== Box office ===
Although it opened the same day as Wedding Crashers and within a week of Fantastic Four, the film's primary competition for its opening weekend was considered to be the sixth installment in the Harry Potter book series. Charlie and the Chocolate Factory earned $56,178,450 in its opening weekend in the United States, the fifth-highest opening-weekend gross for 2005, and remained the highest-grossing film for two weeks. $2.2 million of the opening weekend gross was from 65 IMAX theaters, marking the widest domestic IMAX opening ever at the time. At the time of release, the film's opening earnings marked Depp's highest to date, surpassing Pirates of the Caribbean's $46,630,690 opening. Charlie also set a record for the best-performing opening in July for a PG-rated film. According to studio exit polling conducted during its opening weekend, 54 percent of the film's audience was under the age of 18 and the majority was female.

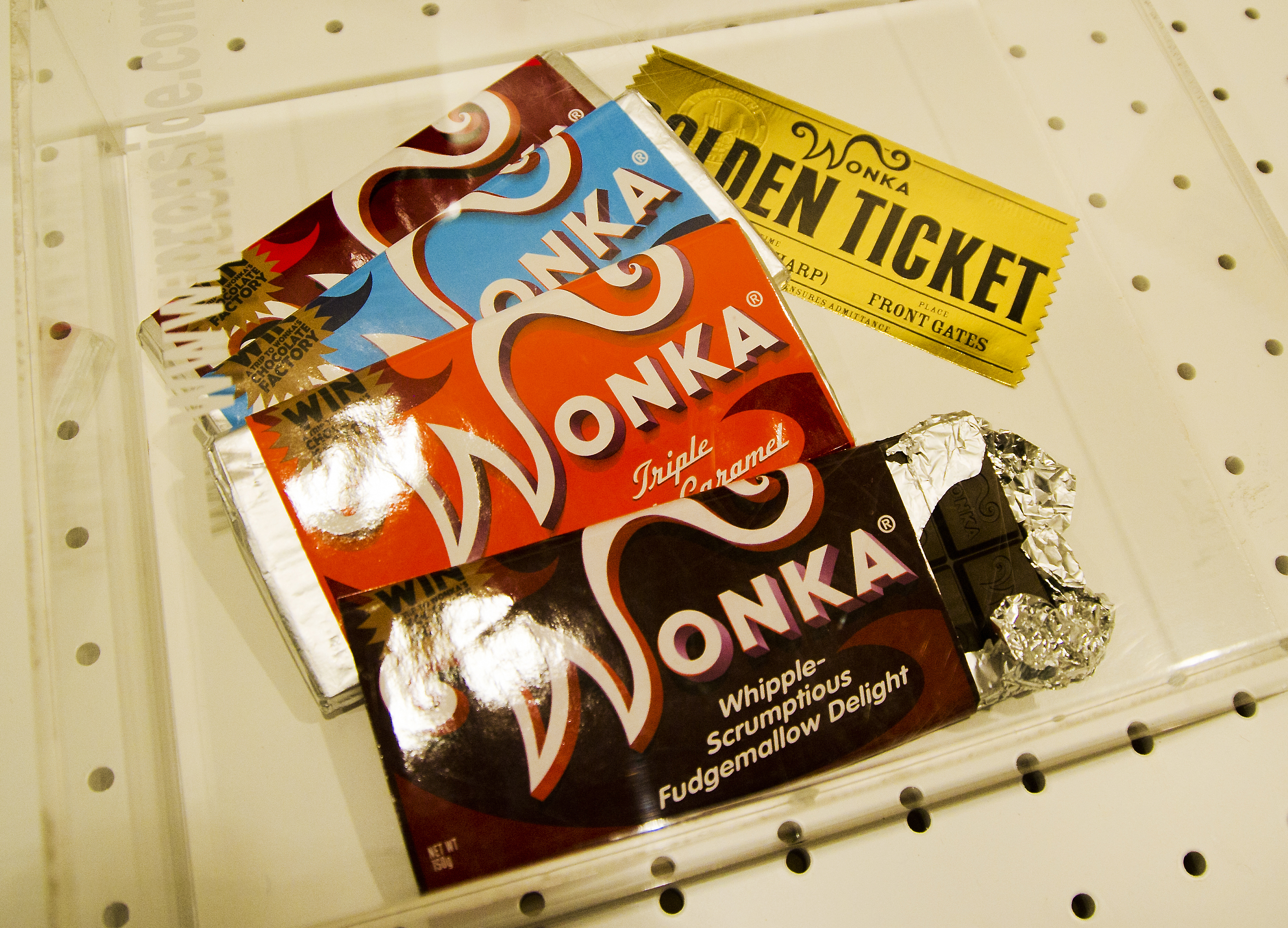
A limited set of Wonka Bars were released as part of the film's marketing campaign.

The film's debut in the United Kingdom "smashed even the most optimistic industry projections", taking in $37.3 million. The film performed well in France, Spain, Australia, and Mexico. Its performance in Germany was considered less than expected. By the end of its theatrical run, the film had grossed $206,459,076 in the United States and $269,366,408 in foreign countries, coming to a worldwide total of $475,825,484.

Charlie and the Chocolate Factory was the 58th-highest-grossing film of all time when released. Worldwide, the film was the eighth-highest-grossing film of 2005, while it was the seventh-highest in the United States and fourth-highest in the United Kingdom. It remains the twenty-first-highest-grossing musical film of all time not adjusted for inflation and Tim Burton's second-highest-grossing, behind only Alice in Wonderland (2010). It is also the eighth-highest-grossing film of Johnny Depp's career. Forbes hypothesized that the film's success could be attributed to Depp and Burton being at the height of their popularity in 2005.

=== Home media ===
Charlie and the Chocolate Factory was released on VHS and DVD on November 8, 2005. The single-disc version of the film included two special features: an Oompa-Loompa dance tutorial and "Becoming Oompa-Loompa", which documented Deep Roy's experience on the production. A two-disc edition was also released which included six more behind the scenes featurettes: "Chocolate Dreams", exploring the writing and Tim Burton's vision for the film; "Different Faces, Different Flavors", exploring the characters; "Designer Chocolate", detailing the production design and costumes; "Sweet Sounds", how Danny Elfman created the Oompa-Loompa songs; "Under the Wrapper", detailing the film's practical and digital effects; and "Attack of the Squirrels", exploring how real squirrels were utilized for Veruca Salt's elimination. The two-disc edition also contained several games and DVD-Rom features. The film's DVD sales underperformed, reaching $16 million by 2010.

For the film's HD DVD release in October 2006, all the behind the scenes featurettes from the two-disc edition were included. The HD DVD release also introduced an audio commentary by Burton, a music-only audio track, a "Club Reel", and an in-movie experience titled "Television Chocolate", with trivia and interviews overlaid onto the screen during the film. A Blu-ray release followed in October 2011, followed by a 10th anniversary Blu-ray release in March 2015. Both sets featured the same bonus features as the HD DVD, although the anniversary edition included a personal retrospective by Burton and a photo book.

== Reception ==
=== Critical response ===
On review aggregator Rotten Tomatoes, 83% of 226 critical reviews of Charlie and the Chocolate Factory are positive, with an average rating of 7.5/10. The website's critical consensus reads, "Closer to the source material than 1971's Willy Wonka & the Chocolate Factory, Charlie and the Chocolate Factory is for people who like their Chocolate visually appealing and dark." According to Metacritic, which calculated a weighted average score of 72 out of 100 from 40 critic reviews, the response to the film was "generally favorable". Audiences polled by CinemaScore gave the film an average grade of "A−" on an A+ to F scale.

A. O. Scott of The New York Times gave a positive review, writing "in spite of relapses and imperfections, a few of them serious, Mr. Burton's movie succeeds in doing what far too few films aimed primarily at children even know how to attempt anymore, which is to feed—even to glut—the youthful appetite for aesthetic surprise." Scott also praised Alex McDowell's set design, comparing the look of the factory to something out of Fritz Lang's Metropolis (1927). Mick LaSalle from the San Francisco Chronicle found Charlie and the Chocolate Factory Burton's "best work in years. If all the laughs come from Depp, who gives Willy the mannerisms of a classic Hollywood diva, the film's heart comes from Highmore, a gifted young performer whose performance is sincere, deep and unforced in a way that's rare in a child actor." Peter Travers wrote in Rolling Stone magazine that "Depp's deliciously demented take on Willy Wonka demands to be seen. Depp goes deeper to find the bruises on Wonka's secret heart than what Gene Wilder did. Depp and Burton may fly too high on the vapors of pure imagination, but it's hard to not get hooked on something this tasty. And how about that army of Oompa-Loompas, all played by Deep Roy, in musical numbers that appear to have been choreographed by Busby Berkeley on crack."

Depp's performance as Willy Wonka drew comparisons to Michael Jackson. Roger Ebert was among the critics who made such comparisons, citing Depp's performance as the weak spot in an "otherwise mostly delightful" film and noting "[Willy Wonka's] reclusive lifestyle, the fetishes of wardrobe and accessories, the elaborate playground built by an adult for the child inside" as parallels between the two. Depp was surprised by the comparisons and stated that he did not base his performance on Jackson. Burton dismissed the comparisons and stated that, unlike Jackson, Depp's iteration of the character does not like children. Ann Hornaday of The Washington Post criticized Depp's acting: "The cumulative effect isn't pretty. Nor is it kooky, funny, eccentric or even mildly interesting. Indeed, throughout his fey, simpering performance, Depp seems to be straining so hard for weirdness that the entire enterprise begins to feel like those excruciating occasions when your parents tried to be hip." Owen Gleiberman of Entertainment Weekly praised Depp's performance, writing "he maintains the paradox, the mystery, of Willy Wonka: a misanthrope who has little patience for children, who can't even utter the word 'parents' without gagging, yet who invents for those same kids the purest and most luscious candies out of the sugar dream of his imagination." Depp earned a Golden Globe Award for Best Actor – Musical or Comedy nomination for his performance but lost to Joaquin Phoenix for Walk the Line.

=== Gene Wilder's reaction ===
In 2004, during on-set interviews while filming, Burton criticized the 1971 film adaptation, while Depp paid homage to Gene Wilder's portrayal and praised it as "brilliant but subtle". Wilder was appreciative towards Depp's comments, but expressed skepticism toward Burton's production, questioning it as a remake made for profit. The filmmakers emphasized that the film was an adaptation of the 1964 book and not a remake of the 1971 film. Depp found Wilder's remarks "disappointing", although "I can understand where he's coming from, I guess." Wilder later praised Depp's casting, saying, "If I were going to cast the movie, I would cast Johnny Depp as Willy Wonka because I think he is wonderful. Mysterious—always—and magical." In 2013, Wilder further criticized the film as a "Warner Bros.' insult", disapproving of Burton "for doing stuff like he did".

=== Legacy ===
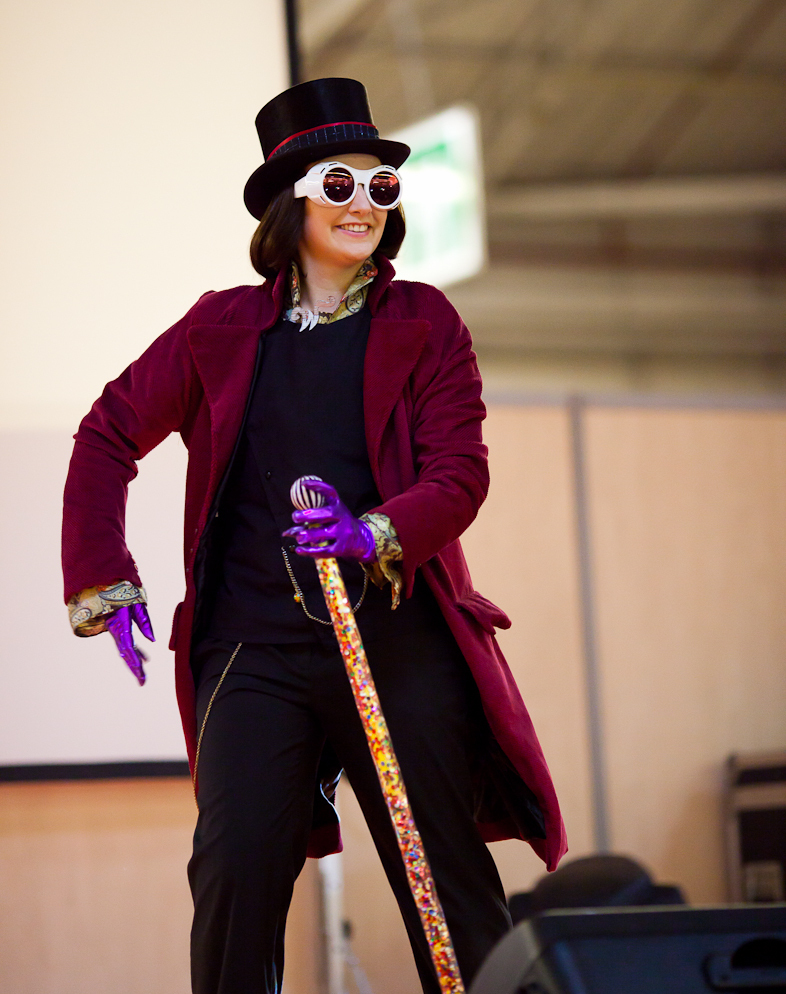

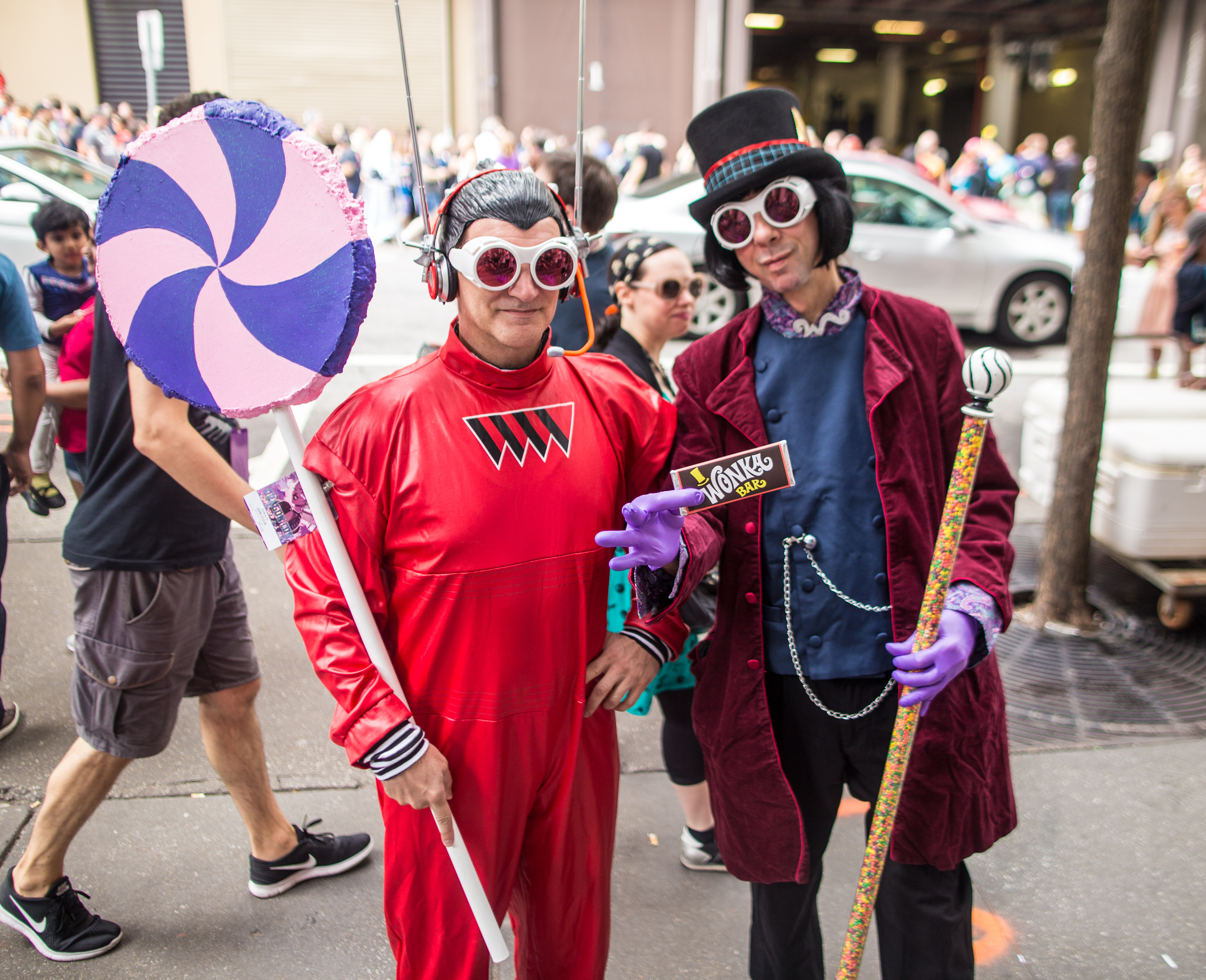
People cosplaying as Willy Wonka at Paris Expo Porte de Versailles (top) and as Willy Wonka and an Oompa-Loompa at Dragon Con (bottom)

In the years following its release, Charlie and the Chocolate Factory has been described as "popular but divisive". Entertainment Weekly and Variety, respectively, ranked Charlie and the Chocolate Factory as Tim Burton's third and fourth-best film, calling it "a delectably sustained flight of fancy" and "a bittersweet homage to our whole relationship to candy and pleasure". Conversely, Time Out named it the worst adaptation of a Roald Dahl book, elaborating "there's something so horribly garish about Burton's film that you can't help feeling a little queasy afterwards." Unlike the 1971 film, Burton's film is regarded as more faithful to Dahl's text.

Guy Lodge of The Guardian claimed that the film's reputation was hurt by Depp's "off-puttingly fey, chilly spin on Wonka", even though "Burton's film handily trumps [the 1971 adaptation] for cinematic verve and vibrancy." Korey Coleman of Double Toasted echoed Lodge's sentiments about Depp's performance, calling it "unsettling" and "off-putting". Despite not caring for the overall film, Coleman praised Burton for applying his own vision to the story rather than imitating the 1971 adaptation. In a series reflecting on Burton's filmography, Griffin Newman of Blank Check praised the film, noting that it had a comic energy that was lacking in Burton's subsequent films such as Alice in Wonderland (2010) and Dark Shadows (2012).

Charlie and the Chocolate Factory has been described as a "Gen Z touchstone" and popular among those who grew up in the 2000s. In 2020, a cosplayer emulating Depp's portrayal of Willy Wonka went viral on TikTok, with Nylon dubbing him "sexy Willy Wonka". During the Depp v. Heard trial, Charlie and the Chocolate Factory was one of the most viewed films on Netflix. In April 2024, Freddie Highmore reprised his role as Charlie Bucket for a skit on Jimmy Kimmel Live!: a fake trailer for a Charlie and the Chocolate Factory sequel parodying the "Willy's Chocolate Experience" event that had gone viral months earlier.

Paul King and Timothée Chalamet, who respectively directed and starred in Wonka (2023), a prequel to Dahl's story, stated that they were fans of Burton's adaptation. While promoting the film in Japan, Chalamet said, "If you would've told me when I was 12 years old watching the Johnny Depp version of Willy Wonka that I'd get to be here in Tokyo promoting this movie as Willy Wonka, standing next to Hugh Grant, I would've told you you were lying." Calah Lane, who portrayed the character of Noodle in Wonka, had only seen Charlie and the Chocolate Factory prior to her audition and was under the impression it was the only adaptation of the book.

=== Awards ===
Award	Category	Recipient	Result	Ref(s).
Academy Awards	Best Costume Design	Gabriella Pescucci	Nominated	
Amanda Awards	Best Foreign Film	Charlie and the Chocolate Factory	Nominated	
American Cinema Editors	Best Edited Feature Film – Comedy or Musical	Chris Lebenzon	Nominated	
Art Directors Guild Awards	Period Feature Film	Art directors and production designer of the film (Note: They are Alex McDowell (production designer), Leslie Tomkins (supervising art director), Kevin Phipps (senior art director), art directors David Allday, François Audouy, Anthony Caron-Delion, Sean Haworth and Andy Nicholson, and assistant art directors Matt Gray, James Lewis and Kathy Heaser.)	Nominated	
BMI Film & TV Awards	Film Music	Danny Elfman	Won	
British Academy Children's Awards	Feature Film	Richard Zanuck and Tim Burton	Nominated	
British Academy Children's Awards	BAFTA Kids' Vote for Best Film	Charlie and the Chocolate Factory	Won	
British Academy Film Awards	Best Production Design	Alex McDowell	Nominated	
British Academy Film Awards	Best Costume Design	Gabriella Pescucci	Nominated	
British Academy Film Awards	Best Makeup and Hair	Peter Owen and Ivana Primorac	Nominated	
British Academy Film Awards	Best Special Visual Effects	Nick Davis, Jon Thum, Chas Jarrett, and Joss Williams	Nominated	
Costume Designers Guild Awards	Excellence in Fantasy Film	Gabriella Pescucci	Nominated	
Critics' Choice Awards	Best Family Film	Charlie and the Chocolate Factory	Nominated	
Critics' Choice Awards	Best Young Actor	Freddie Highmore	Won	
Empire Awards	Best Actor	Johnny Depp	Won	
Golden Globe Awards	Best Actor – Musical or Comedy	Johnny Depp	Nominated	
Grammy Awards	Best Song Written for Visual Media	John August and Danny Elfman for "Wonka's Welcome Song"	Nominated	
International Film Music Critics Awards	Best Original Score for a Fantasy/Science Fiction Film	Danny Elfman	Nominated	
Irish Film & Television Awards	Best International Film	Charlie and the Chocolate Factory	Won	
Irish Film & Television Awards	Best International Actor	Johnny Depp	Nominated	
Irish Film & Television Awards	Best Supporting Actor in a Feature Film	David Kelly	Nominated	
Japan Academy Film Prize	Outstanding Foreign Language Film	Charlie and the Chocolate Factory	Nominated	
Kids' Choice Awards	Favorite Movie	Charlie and the Chocolate Factory	Nominated	
Kids' Choice Awards	Favorite Movie Actor	Johnny Depp	Nominated	
London Film Critics Circle Awards	Actor of the Year	Johnny Depp	Nominated	
Motion Picture Sound Editors	Best Sound Editing in Feature Film: Music	Charlie and the Chocolate Factory	Nominated	
Motion Picture Sound Editors	Best Sound Editing in Feature Film: Foreign	Charlie and the Chocolate Factory	Nominated	
Nastro d'Argento	Special Silver Ribbon	Gabriella Pescucci	Won	
People's Choice Awards	Favorite Family Movie	Charlie and the Chocolate Factory	Won	
People's Choice Awards	Favorite Motion Picture Actor	Johnny Depp	Won	
Russian National Movie Awards	Best Blockbuster Movie	Charlie and the Chocolate Factory	Nominated	
Russian National Movie Awards	Best Actor	Johnny Depp	Won (Note: Also for his performance in Finding Neverland)	
Satellite Awards	Best Cinematography	Philippe Rousselot	Nominated	
Satellite Awards	Outstanding Youth DVD	Charlie and the Chocolate Factory (2-Disc Deluxe Edition)	Nominated	
Saturn Awards	Best Fantasy Film	Charlie and the Chocolate Factory	Nominated	
Saturn Awards	Best Performance by a Younger Actor	Freddie Highmore	Nominated	
Saturn Awards	Best Costume Design	Gabriella Pescucci	Nominated	
Saturn Awards	Best Music	Danny Elfman	Nominated	
Teen Choice Awards	Choice Movie Actor: Comedy	Johnny Depp	Won	
Visual Effects Society Awards	Best Single Visual Effect of the Year	"Nut Room" – Nick Davis, Nikki Penny, Jon Thum, Ben Morris	Nominated	
World Soundtrack Awards	Soundtrack Composer of the Year	Danny Elfman	Nominated	
Young Artist Awards	Best Family Feature Film: Comedy or Musical	Charlie and the Chocolate Factory	Won	
Young Artist Awards	Best Performance in a Feature Film: Leading Young Actor	Freddie Highmore	Nominated	

== See also ==
- List of films featuring miniature people
