= Willy Wonka =

Fictional character in Roald Dahl novels

- Charlie and the Chocolate Factory character
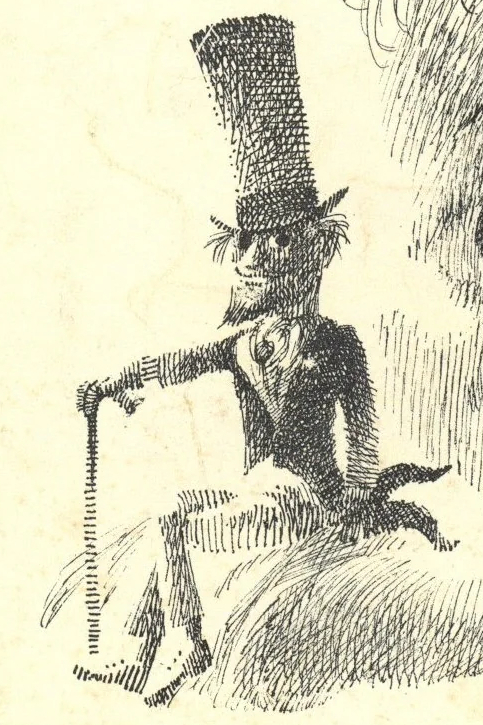
- Willy Wonka from the front cover of the first US edition
- First appearance: Charlie and the Chocolate Factory (1964)
- Created by: Roald Dahl
- Portrayed by: Gene Wilder (1971); Johnny Depp (2005); Timothée Chalamet (2023); Other: Blair Dunlop (young; 2005); Douglas Hodge (2013); Alex Jennings (2014); Jonathan Slinger (2015); Christian Borle (2017); Colin O'Brien (young; 2023); Michael Ball (2027)
- Voiced by: Jess Harnell (commercials); James Arnold Taylor (2005 video game); J. P. Karliak (Tom and Jerry: Willy Wonka and the Chocolate Factory); Taika Waititi (Charlie vs. the Chocolate Factory)

In-universe information
- Full name: Willy Wonka; William Wonka (2023 film)
- Occupation: Chocolatier; Inventor; Magician
- Family: Wilbur Wonka (father; 2005 film); Mamma (mother; 2023 film)
- Children: Charlie Bucket (legal heir)

Willy Wonka is a fictional character appearing in British author Roald Dahl's 1964 children's novel Charlie and the Chocolate Factory and its 1972 sequel Charlie and the Great Glass Elevator. He is the eccentric founder and proprietor of the Wonka Chocolate Factory.

Wonka has been depicted in film several times. In 1971, Willy Wonka was portrayed by Gene Wilder in Willy Wonka & the Chocolate Factory. Wilder's portrayal in the film is widely beloved and is considered one of his greatest roles. Johnny Depp played the character in 2005's Charlie and the Chocolate Factory which polarized critics and audiences. In 2023, Timothée Chalamet portrayed the character in a standalone film that tells his origin story titled Wonka. Chalamet's performance was both praised and criticized. Wilder, Depp, and Chalamet all received Golden Globe nominations for Best Actor in a Comedy or Musical for their performances.

== Appearances ==
=== Charlie and the Chocolate Factory ===
In Charlie and the Chocolate Factory, Wonka has hidden five Golden Tickets inside his chocolate bars. The finders are rewarded with a tour of his factory, each accompanied by an adult of their choice, and a lifetime supply of chocolate. The children are unaware, though, that the tour is also a competition to test their moral character. As the tour proceeds, four of the children are eliminated, leaving Charlie Bucket the winner. At this point, Wonka reveals that the real prize is the factory itself. He needs someone to take it over once he retires, and look after the Oompa-Loompas who work there.

Wonka is introduced as a "little man" with a goatee, wearing a purple coat, green trousers and a top hat. He is high-spirited and moves quickly like a squirrel, though he later tells Charlie that he is "much older than you think."

=== Charlie and the Great Glass Elevator ===
Wonka goes aboard the Great Glass Elevator with Charlie and his family and links up with the Space Hotel USA. The Space Hotel tracks the Elevator down back to Wonka's factory. Wonka then goes with Charlie and his family to the White House in the United States.

== Film adaptations ==
=== Willy Wonka & the Chocolate Factory (1971) ===
Gene Wilder as Willy Wonka in Willy Wonka & the Chocolate Factory (1971).

Willy Wonka (portrayed by Gene Wilder) has hidden five Golden Tickets among his famous Wonka Bars. The finders of these special tickets will be given a full tour of his tightly guarded candy factory, as well as a lifetime supply of chocolate. During the tour, Wonka tempts each of the bad children to disobey his orders with something related to their individual character flaws. One by one, each child disappears from the tour, until eventually Charlie Bucket is the only remaining child. However, Charlie and Grandpa Joe have also succumbed to temptation by this time and sampled Fizzy Lifting Drinks, Mr. Wonka's experimental line of beverages that gives the drinker the power to float temporarily. The drinks, still too strong, brought Charlie and Grandpa Joe close to death before burping saved them.

Wonka informs Charlie that the tour is over, abruptly dismisses him and Grandpa Joe, and disappears into his office without mentioning the promised grand prize of a lifetime supply of chocolate. They both go into Wonka's office to confront him. Grandpa Joe asks about the prize, but Wonka tells him that Charlie will not receive it because he broke the rules, angrily referring to the forfeiture clause of the contract that the ticket holders signed at the start of the tour. Charlie's drinking of the Fizzy Lifting Drinks amounted to theft, so he violated the contract and gets nothing. Wonka then dismisses them with a furious, "Good day, sir!" Grandpa Joe angrily berates him for destroying his grandson's hopes, but Wonka is unmoved and angrily dismisses him again.

Grandpa Joe vows revenge on Wonka by selling the Everlasting Gobstopper to Slugworth (Wonka's main rival), but in honest acknowledgement of his wrongdoing, Charlie decides to return the Gobstopper to Wonka's desk before turning to leave. Seeing how Charlie did not resort to revenge, Wonka sees an honest character in him and decides to let the fizzy lifting drink incident pass. He joyfully tells Charlie that he passed his test and reinstates his prize. Wonka then reveals that Slugworth, who had been spying on the kids, was actually his own employee, Mr. Wilkinson, in disguise.

The trio enter the Great Glass Elevator, which goes high into the sky. Wonka reveals that the grand prize is really the entire factory and business, which Charlie will get when Wonka retires. In the meantime Charlie and his whole family will move into the factory. Wonka reminds Charlie not to forget what happened to the man who got everything that he ever wanted: "He lived happily ever after."

=== Charlie and the Chocolate Factory (2005) ===
Johnny Depp as Willy Wonka in Charlie and the Chocolate Factory (2005).

Willy Wonka (portrayed by Johnny Depp as an adult and by Blair Dunlop in his youth) is once again the owner of a famous chocolate factory. Due to problems concerning industrial espionage, he has laid off all his employees, among them Charlie's Grandpa Joe, and closed his factory for many years. Wonka announces a contest in which five Golden Tickets have been hidden under the wrappers of Wonka Bars throughout the world. The finders will each receive a tour of the factory and a lifetime supply of chocolate; in addition, one winner will receive a special prize at the end of the tour. Charlie is the last to find a Golden Ticket.

On the day of the tour, Wonka greets the winners and the adults accompanying them at the factory gates and leads them through the compound. Grandpa Joe, who accompanies Charlie, introduces himself to Wonka as a former employee, but Wonka is still suspicious of him. One by one, all of the children except Charlie succumb to temptations offered by Wonka and are removed from the tour. Wonka offers Charlie a chance to live and work with him in the factory, explaining that he is getting old, and that the purpose of the contest was to find a successor to take over as owner once he retires. However, Wonka expects Charlie to leave his family behind forever, seeing family as a hindrance to a chocolatier's creative freedom.

Wonka's position stems from a complicated relationship with his father, Wilbur, a prominent dentist, in which Wilbur forbade him to eat any candy and made him wear a large, cumbersome set of uncomfortable braces in order to keep his teeth in good condition. Wonka secretly sampled some candy one day and was instantly enthralled, running away from home and travelling to Switzerland and Bavaria in order to pursue a career in making it. Upon his return, the subject discovered that Wilbur, acting on prior notice regarding the consequences of flight, had orchestrated the complete relocation of the residence to an undisclosed location.

Charlie, who is not prepared to part with his family, rejects the offer, prompting Wonka to fall into a deep depression that saps his creativity and causes his business to suffer. With Charlie's help, Wonka locates Wilbur. As Wilbur checks Wonka's teeth, from which he recognises his son, Charlie finds that Wilbur is genuinely proud of his son, having saved every news clipping of Wonka's success. The two reconcile, and Wonka invites the entire Bucket family to live in the factory.

=== Wonka (2023) ===
Timothée Chalamet as Willy Wonka in the 2023 film Wonka.

In the 2023 film Wonka, he is portrayed by Timothée Chalamet. The film tells a standalone origin story of the character about his early days as a chocolatier. In this version, a new backstory was added which reveals his even more troubled upbringing: Willy Wonka's mother (who made chocolate bars) had died and the young Wonka traveled to Europe to open his own chocolate shop. At the end of the film, after exposing the crimes of the local Chocolate Cartel, Wonka opens the last chocolate bar his mother left him, which is revealed to contain a golden paper with a message telling him that chocolate is best shared with others. He and Lofty, an Oompa Loompa, would then acquire an abandoned castle to commence building a new factory.

== Stage musical adaptations ==
=== Charlie and the Chocolate Factory (2013) ===
In 2013, a stage musical adaptation of the novel was produced at the Theatre Royal, Drury Lane in the West End starting on 25 June 2013. Willy Wonka in this production was originated by Douglas Hodge, followed by Alex Jennings and Jonathan Slinger. In the play, Wonka decides to open his factory to five children who can find one of five Golden Tickets hidden in the wrappers of Wonka Bars. The play begins with Charlie in a large trash pile looking for items that are "almost nearly perfect". He later goes home and we see the Golden Ticket winners on an oversized television with actors inside it. Once all the tickets have been won, Willy Wonka invites the children into his factory, where he then tempts each of them with a weakness. Finally, only Charlie is left. Willy Wonka and Charlie board Wonka's "Great Glass Elevator", which takes off over the audience.

A reworked version of the musical, featuring added songs from the 1971 film adaptation, premiered on Broadway in 2017. Wonka was portrayed this time by Christian Borle. While the Broadway version received mixed to negative reviews, Borle's performance was praised. A U.S. tour commenced in 2018, with Noah Weisberg playing Wonka, and the musical premiered in Australia in 2019.

== Spin-offs ==
=== Tom and Jerry: Willy Wonka and the Chocolate Factory (2017) ===
In 2017, a direct-to-DVD animated film featuring Tom and Jerry in an adaptation of the 1971 film was released. The main storyline is largely taken verbatim from the 1971 version. Wonka (voiced by J. P. Karliak) is portrayed mostly the same as in the 1971 film. During the tour, Wonka becomes suspicious that one of the guests has smuggled a cat into the factory after seeing bits of fur left by Tom, who along with Jerry had previously been adopted by Charlie, and snuck into the factory in an attempt to stop what they believe to be Slugworth plotting to steal Wonka's secrets. Wonka eventually notices Tom and Jerry's presence, and accuses Charlie of smuggling them into the factory. However this turns out to be part of a test for Charlie as Wonka had intended to make Charlie the next owner of the factory from the very start.

=== Wonka film novelization ===
In 2023, Sibéal Pounder wrote a novelization of the screenplay of Wonka as an origin story for the chocolatier.

== Film characters ==
=== 2005 film adaptation ===
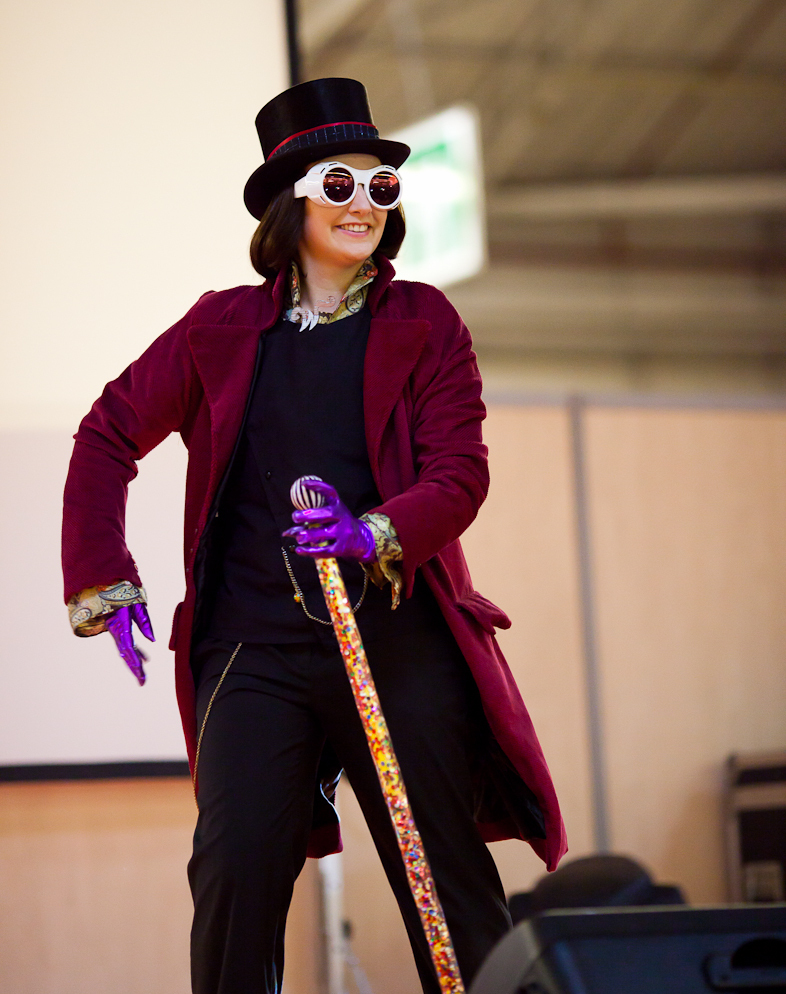
A person cosplaying as Willy Wonka, as depicted in the 2005 film

Early on in the production of the 2005 film, Nicolas Cage was under discussions for portraying Willy Wonka, but lost interest. Warner Bros. president Alan F. Horn wanted Tom Shadyac to direct Jim Carrey as Willy Wonka, believing the duo could make Charlie and the Chocolate Factory relevant to mainstream audiences, but Roald Dahl's widow Liccy Dahl opposed this. After Tim Burton was hired as director in May 2003, Burton immediately thought of Johnny Depp for the role of Willy Wonka, who joined the following August for his fourth collaboration with the director.

Burton and screenwriter John August worked together in creating Wilbur Wonka, Willy's domineering dentist father. "You want a little bit of the flavor of why Wonka is the way he is," Burton reasoned. "Otherwise, what is he? He's just a weird guy." Warner Bros. and Burton held differences over the characterization of Willy Wonka. The studio wanted to make Willy Wonka the idyllic father figure Charlie Bucket had longed for his entire life. Burton believed that Wonka would not be a good father, finding the character similar to a recluse. "In some ways," Burton protested, "he's more screwed up than the kids."

Johnny Depp was the only actor that Burton had considered for the role. He signed on without reading the script, under the intention of going with a completely different approach than what Gene Wilder did in the 1971 film adaptation. "Regardless of what one thinks of that film," Depp explained, "Gene Wilder's persona, his character, stands out." Depp stated on The Ellen DeGeneres Show that he based the character on what he believed an "incredibly stoned" George W. Bush would act like.

Comparisons were drawn between Willy Wonka and Michael Jackson, due to Wonka's more childish demeanour. Burton joked, "Here's the deal. There's a big difference: Michael Jackson likes children, Willy Wonka can't stand them. To me that's a huge difference in the whole persona thing." Depp explained that the similarities with Jackson never even occurred to him. "I say if there was anyone you'd want to compare Wonka to it would be a Howard Hughes, almost. Reclusive, germaphobe, controlling." Burton agreed with the Hughes similarities, and additionally supplied Charles Foster Kane in Citizen Kane as inspiration. "Somebody who was brilliant but then was traumatized and then retreats into their own world." Depp wanted to sport prosthetic makeup for the part and have a long, elongated nose, but Burton believed that it would be too outrageous.

== Critical analysis ==
=== Gene Wilder's performance ===
Wilder's performance as Willy Wonka was well received and remains one of his best-known roles. Time Out Film Guide called it "Great fun, with Wilder for once giving an impeccably controlled performance as the factory's bizarre candy owner." Critic Jeffrey M. Anderson, of Combustible Celluloid, wrote, "[W]hen the movie does actually reach the factory, and Gene Wilder takes the stage, the movie is saved. Wilder was in the middle of an incredible run of subtle comic performances ... and he was at the height of his powers here." Wilder himself considered the role to be one of his signature roles, with his next of kin noting that he purposely kept his diagnosis of Alzheimer's disease private because so many young children would recognize him on the street as Wonka and he wanted those encounters to be joyful experiences.

Regarding Wilder's effect, Anderson wrote "If you're a kid, Wonka seems magical, but watching it now, he has a frightening combination of warmth, psychosis, and sadism." Kevin Carr, of 7M pictures wrote "This is Gene Wilder's legacy. He was perfect for the role, and it was his mixture of childlike wonder and bitter, deserved vengeance that made the character so compelling.", while critic Widgett Walls simply called it "Probably Gene Wilder's finest, most manic hour." Wilder received a nomination for the Golden Globe Award for Best Actor in a Musical or Comedy for his role as Willy Wonka, but lost to Chaim Topol as Tevye in Fiddler on the Roof.

=== Johnny Depp's performance ===
Johnny Depp's portrayal of Willy Wonka polarized critics and audiences. Critic Andrew Sarris, of The New York Observer, who did not enjoy the film's style in general, wrote "I wonder if even children will respond to the peculiarly humorless and charmless stylistic eccentricities of Mr. Burton and his star, Johnny Depp." Ann Hornaday of The Washington Post also criticized Depp's acting; "The cumulative effect isn't pretty. Nor is it kooky, funny, eccentric or even mildly interesting. Indeed, throughout his fey, simpering performance, Depp seems to be straining so hard for weirdness that the entire enterprise begins to feel like those excruciating occasions when your parents tried to be hip." Roger Ebert wrote "Depp, an actor of considerable gifts, has never been afraid to take a chance, but this time he takes the wrong one. His Willy Wonka is an enigma in an otherwise mostly delightful movie from Tim Burton."

Positive reactions to Depp's performance include Owen Gleiberman of Entertainment Weekly, who wrote that "Johnny Depp as Willy Wonka may be a stone freak, but he is also one of Burton's classic crackpot conjurers, like Beetlejuice or Ed Wood." Mick LaSalle from the San Francisco Chronicle found that "all the laughs [in the film] come from Depp, who gives Willy the mannerisms of a classic Hollywood diva". Peter Travers wrote in Rolling Stone magazine that "Depp's deliciously demented take on Willy Wonka demands to be seen. Depp goes deeper to find the bruises on Wonka's secret heart than what Gene Wilder did." Depp received a nomination for the Golden Globe Award for Best Actor in a Musical or Comedy for his role as Willy Wonka, but lost to Joaquin Phoenix as Johnny Cash in Walk the Line.

=== Timothée Chalamet's performance ===
Chalamet's take on the character received mixed reviews. Courtney Howard of The A.V. Club praised Chalamet's performance: "His magical emcee isn't too far off from Gene Wilder's as glimpsed in his physicality and vocal intonations, but his performance has its own unique sway and ease." Kristy Puchko of Mashable called Chalamet "marvelous" as Wonka: "He is positively lovely, like he's got some bottled sunshine of his own... Giddy and genuine, Chalamet is a prince of musical theater, whether dancing with a rousing ensemble or waltzing with a hat and coat on a walking stick as a stand-in partner." Katie Walsh of the Los Angeles Times offered similar praise: "[He] gives himself over fully to the wonderment and vocal demands of the role."

David Fear of Rolling Stone likened Chalamet to a "void": "You wish that Chalamet was bringing something, anything, to what too often feels like character karaoke. He's not bad, just blank." Alison Willmore of Vulture cited Chalamet's performance as the weakest part of Wonka, "which isn't to say that he's bad in the movie – just hesitant, like he's working in an idiom that doesn't come naturally to him, which is odd." Michael O'Sullivan of The Washington Post called Chalamet's performance "one-dimensional" and criticized him as "a character so purely benevolent and selfless that he makes Jesus, Gandhi and the Buddha look like a bunch of hooligans."

Chalamet received a nomination for the Golden Globe Award for Best Actor in a Musical or Comedy for the role but lost to Paul Giamatti for The Holdovers.

== Merchandising ==
Wonka served as the mascot of The Willy Wonka Candy Company, a real-life brand of confectioneries marketed by Nestlé Candy Shop. Real-life versions of the Everlasting Gobstopper and the Wonka Bar were produced, along with a line of other candies not directly related to the book or the film. The company had originated as a tie-in with the 1971 film, originally by Quaker Oats before a series of sales led to the company being acquired by Nestlé in 1988. The Wonka brand was discontinued in 2015; its products have since been sold to Ferrero, which produces them under the Ferrara brand.

== See also ==
- List of Charlie and the Chocolate Factory characters
