= Philip Wiegratz =

German actor

- Born: 17 February 1993 (age 33); Magdeburg, Saxony-Anhalt, Germany
- Occupation: Actor
- Years active: 2005–2013

Philip Wiegratz (born 17 February 1993) is a German former actor. His first and most famous film role was playing Augustus Gloop in Tim Burton's Charlie and the Chocolate Factory.

== Life and career ==
Wiegratz was born on 17 February 1993 in Magdeburg. He is known for his 2005 portrayal of the greedy Augustus Gloop in Charlie and the Chocolate Factory. Wiegratz went to a casting call not being sure of receiving any particular part, but caught the attention of a casting director and was placed on a shortlist for the role of Augustus. He returned for several callbacks and eventually received the part, which marked his English-language film debut and also required Wiegratz to wear a fatsuit. He performed his own stunts in the scenes of Augustus falling into the river in Wonka's Chocolate Room.

In 2006, Wiegratz starred in the eponymous film version of Cornelia Funke's Wild Chicks as a member of an all-boys group called the Pygmies and returned for a sequel the following year. Both pictures were commercial successes, and he and several co-stars were guests on the German children's television program Ki.Ka Live on 2 April 2007. In 2012, Wiegratz played Helmut in Lore, and Gordon Gelderman in Ruby Red the following year.

== Filmography ==
- Charlie and the Chocolate Factory (2005)
- A Christmoose Carol (2005)
- Berndivent (one episode, 2006)
- Wild Chicks (2006)
- Wild Chicks in Love (2007)
- Ki.Ka Live (one episode, 2007)
- The Wild Chicks and Life (2009)
- Lore (2012)
- Ruby Red (2013)
- Mein Sommer '88 – Wie die Stars die DDR rockten (2013)
