= Wonka Bar =

Fictional chocolate bar

- Charlie and the Chocolate Factory element
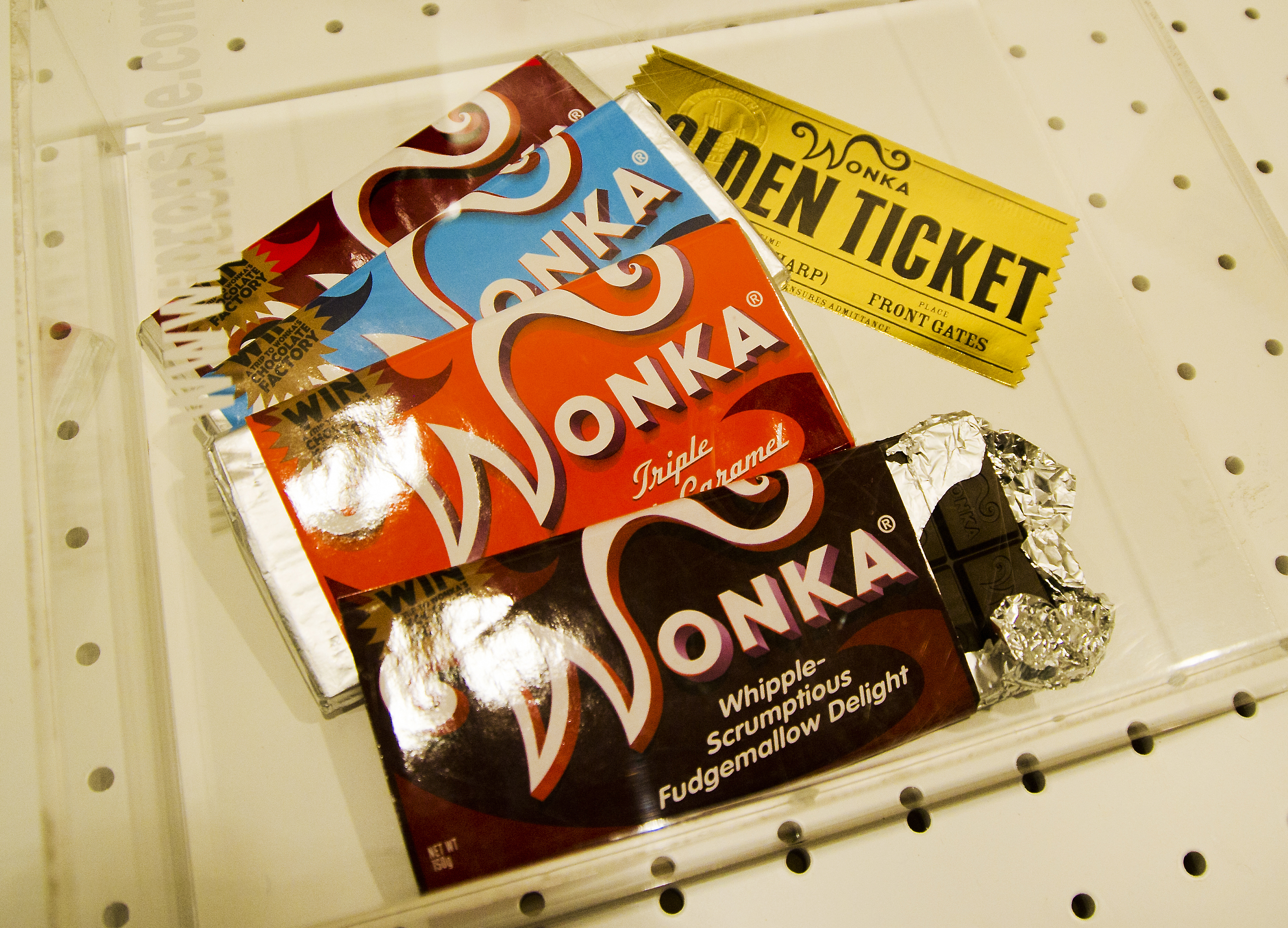
- Prop Wonka Bars from 2005's Charlie and the Chocolate Factory
- First appearance: Charlie and the Chocolate Factory; (1964)
- Created by: Roald Dahl
- Genre: Fantasy

In-universe information
- Type: Chocolate bar
- Affiliation: Willy Wonka

The Wonka Bar is originally a fictional chocolate bar, introduced as a key story point in Roald Dahl's 1964 children's classic novel Charlie and the Chocolate Factory. Wonka Bars appear in each film adaptation of the novel: Willy Wonka & the Chocolate Factory (1971); Charlie and the Chocolate Factory (2005), and Wonka (2023). The bar also appeared in the musical adaptation of the novel, Charlie and the Chocolate Factory (2013).

Quaker Oats created Wonka Bars. The 1971 movie was funded largely by Quaker Oats for the intention of promoting the soon-to-be-released Wonka Bars. However, Quaker Oats chose not to market the bars, instead selling the brand to their manufacturer Sunline.

Other varieties of Wonka Bars were subsequently manufactured and sold in the real world, formerly by the Willy Wonka Candy Company, a division of Nestlé. These bars were discontinued in January 2010 due to poor sales.However, in November 2026, a similar chocolate bar, the Wonka Purplypurple Bar, was introduced, filled with purple-colored caramel.

== In media ==
In Roald Dahl's novel Charlie and the Chocolate Factory and its film adaptations, a Wonka Bar is a chocolate bar and Willy Wonka's signature product, said to be the "perfect candy bar". The wrappers of the 1971 version are brown with an orange and pink border with a top hat over the "W" in Wonka, similar to the film's logo, and the chocolate bars resemble Cadbury Dairy Milk chocolate bars.

In the 2005 version, the wrappers feature different shades of a color and are also more detailed, including a more stylised "W" without a top hat, and the chocolate bars strikingly resemble king-sized Kit Kat chocolate bars, only slightly bigger. In the book, Grandpa Joe mentions that Mr. Wonka had invented over two hundred kinds of Wonka bars.

== Product ==
The consumer product Wonka Bar from 2005 to 2010

The consumer product Wonka Bar was a chocolate bar inspired by the novel and the films Willy Wonka & the Chocolate Factory and Charlie & the Chocolate Factory. The Quaker Oats Company, which financed the 1971 film with US$3 million, originally created a chocolate bar in time to publicize the 1971 film. In the documentary Pure Imagination, producer David L. Wolper claims the bar was released to stores, but quickly recalled due to a production problem.

=== Nestlé Wonka Bars ===
Manufactured by Nestlé and sold under their Willy Wonka Candy Company brand, Wonka Bars sold in the United States until January 2010. Wonka Bars consisted of small graham cracker pieces dipped in milk chocolate. Chicago's Breaker Confections launched the brand in 1976, and Nestle purchased in 1988. Other bars produced included Wonka Xploder, Wonkalate and Wonka Biscuits.

To promote the 2005 film Charlie and the Chocolate Factory, five different Wonka products were each packaged with a Golden Ticket, as in the novel and films. Each Golden Ticket awarded a different prize to its finder; the one in the Wonka bar awarded $10,000 cash.

A Nestlé factory in Europe began producing Wonka Bars in the flavors and wrappers depicted in the 2005 film: Whipple-Scrumptious Fudgemallow Delight, Nutty Crunch Surprise and Triple Dazzle Caramel.

Nestlé Japan also released some Wonka Bars, in two flavours, Whipple Scrumptious Caramel Delight and Mysterious Spit-Spat Bar. These bars feature a wrapper done in the same style as the bars that appear in the Tim Burton film adaptation. More flavors appeared, including Piritto Natty Bur, Edible Garden, Eureka Moment, Happy Go Lucky, and Making WoW! Nestlé Japan also released a toy truck containing these bars. However, they have since been discontinued after the sale to Ferrero.

In March 2010, Nestlé USA introduced a new line of chocolate bars named "Wonka Exceptionals", consisting of three varieties. The Wonka Scrumdiddlyumptious Chocolate Bar consists of bits of toffee, cookie and peanuts in milk chocolate. The Wonka Chocolate Waterfall Bar contains white chocolate swirled with milk chocolate, and the Wonka Domed Dark Chocolate Bar is made of dark chocolate topped with milk chocolate medallions. Wonka launched the product line with an in-package Golden Ticket sweepstakes. Ten Golden Tickets could be found in bars and bags of Wonka Exceptionals chocolates, and each ticket was worth a grand prize of a trip around the world. Recent new additions to the Wonka Exceptionals include Wonka Triple Dazzle Caramel, which consists of milk chocolate filled with caramel and a dash of sea salt, and Wonka Fantabulous Fudge, which consists of chocolate fudge in milk chocolate. They were discontinued in 2012.

On 9 August 2013, Nestle UK announced that the Wonka Bar was to return to the UK, after having not been sold since 2005. The new Wonka Bars are available in small individual bars and 100g big block bars. There are currently three flavours, Millionaire's Shortbread, Crème Brûlée and Chocolate Nice Cream. Crème Brûlée is not available in small bars and is only available in big block bars. The small individual bars went on sale on 16 September 2013 and the big block bars went on sale in October that year. They never sold in the United States, and were discontinued in 2014 due to falling sales.

In late 2013, Nestlé Australia and New Zealand introduced new additions to the Wonka Bar Line, 170g Big Blocks Bars which were released in four flavours, Wonka Triple Chocolate Whipple Bar, Nutty Crunchilicious, Caramel Hat Trick and Chocolate Tales Bar. More additions included Cookie Creamery, and Mudpuff Caramel Stuff, also released in smaller sizes. These also got discontinued later.

=== Fake bars ===
In the UK there is an ongoing trend of fake Wonka bars being sold. In 2013, a shop in Manchester was fined for selling fake Wonka bars with a fake 'golden ticket' prize. Other cases of the fake bars were reported across the UK.

In 2022, the Food Standards Agency issued a warning that fake Wonka bars were being sold in the UK with incorrect allergy advice. Bars were found to contain allergens such as nuts, which were not listed on the label. A shop in Barnsley was fined for selling fake bars. Westminster City Council seized over £100,000 in fake Wonka bars from shops on Oxford Street.

== See also ==
- Everlasting Gobstopper
