= DashCon 2 =

Annual Tumblr convention in Canada

- Status: Active
- Genre: Tumblr, fandom culture
- Frequency: Annually
- Venue: Japanese Canadian Cultural Centre, Toronto
- Country: Canada
- Years active: 2025; 1 year ago
- Inaugurated: July 5, 2025
- Founders: Avis Petrie, Simone Miller
- Most recent: 2026
- Website: dashcontwo.com

DashCon 2 is a fan convention held annually since 2025 in Toronto, Canada, themed around the culture of the social media website Tumblr. It is named after and themed similarly to the 2014 convention of the same name but is otherwise unrelated and has been received significantly more positively.

== Background ==
The original DashCon was a fan convention catering primarily to users of the blogging platform Tumblr, with a particular emphasis on fandoms. The convention was planned to be hosted during the weekend of July 11, 2014 at the Renaissance Schaumburg Convention Center Hotel in Schaumburg, Illinois. The event was widely considered a failure, due to multiple allegations of mismanagement, corruption among the organizers, and the abrupt demand to pay upfront in order to hold the convention at the hotel and use its facilities. The convention's founder, Lochlan "Nessie" O'Neil, later described the event as the worst days of her life, receiving death threats from strangers long afterwards.

In the following years, there were various failed proposals to launch similar conventions, including Emoti-Con and DashCon 2024.

== Development ==
DashCon 2 was announced by co-directors Avis Petrie and Simone Miller in 2024, 10 years after the original DashCon. Both are Tumblr users with experience in conventions and are unaffiliated with the organizers of the original DashCon, and they stated that they have "no intention of repeating DashCon's mistakes".

== History ==
=== 2025 ===
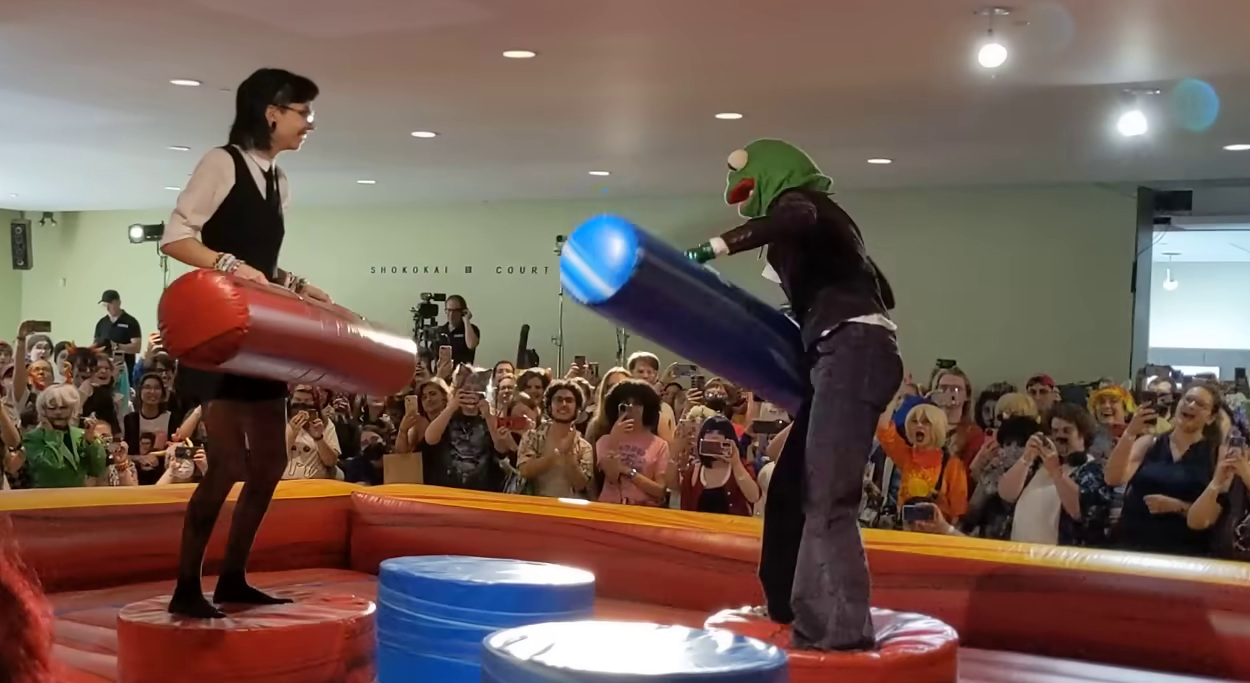
The 2025 edition of DashCon 2 featured a duel between two content creators, Strange Æons (left) and The Muppet Joker (right).

The inaugural edition of DashCon 2 was held in Toronto on July 5, 2025. DashCon 2 focused on "celebrating a very specific era of fandom culture, as well as the original DashCon event". Despite challenges during its planning, the event was generally seen as having been very successful, especially compared to the original DashCon; it was praised for coziness, accessibility, and its representation of queer- and nerd culture. It was also highlighted as an example of a success among other contemporary conventions themed around Internet culture.

The event attracted 550 in-person visitors, including Lochlan O’Neil (founder of the 2014 DashCon) and several content creators. Activities included cosplaying, panels, an Artist Alley with 86 vendors, a new ball pit, a charity fundraiser for the Canadian Cancer Society, and a duel between two content creators.

=== 2026 ===
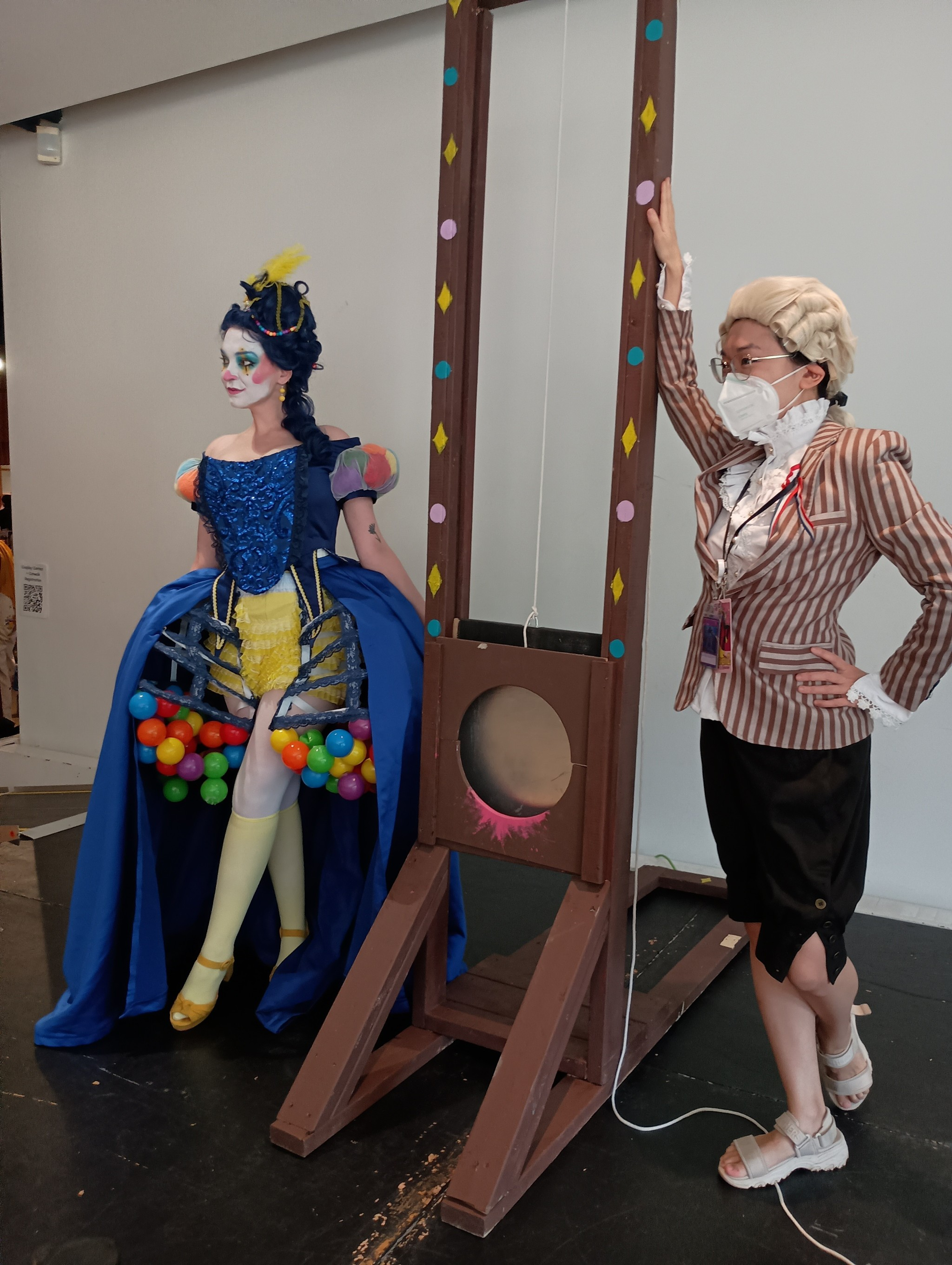
The 2026 edition of DashCon 2 was themed around the French Revolution and included a prop guillotine. Among the featured guests was Lochlan O'Neil (left) and Xiran Jay Zhao (right).

The second edition of DashCon 2 was held on August 1–2, 2026. The 2026 event saw its duration increase to 2 days, expanded its accessibility accommodation, and was themed around the French Revolution. New activities included a symbolic triple wedding of the fandom SuperWhoLock and a theatrical execution. Among the 1,000 in-person attendees were YouTubers Overly Sarcastic Productions and Harriyanna Hook, as well as recurring guests O’Neil, Strange Æons, and Xiran Jay Zhao (the latter cosplaying as Maximilien Robespierre).
