= List of city departments in Springfield, Illinois =

This is a list of Springfield city departments. The departments are part of the larger municipal government of the capital of the U.S. state of Illinois, Springfield.

== Boards and commissions ==
- Disability Commission
- Historic Sites Commission
- Municipal Band Commission
- Veterans Advisory Council
- Springfield Metropolitan Exposition and Auditorium Authority

== Divisions ==
- Building Division - Department of Public Works
- City Engineer
- International Visitors Commission
- Oak Ridge Cemetery
- Traffic Engineering Department
- Vital Records
- Zoning Division - Department of Public Works

== Executive offices ==
- City Clerk
- City Treasurer
- Communications Director
- Council Coordinator
- Executive Assistant
- Mayor

== General departments ==
- Department of Community Relations
- Department of Public Works
- Fire Department
- Office of Budget & Management
- Office of Business Licensing
- Office of Corporation Counsel
- Office of Education Liaison
- Office of Human Resources
- Office of Planning & Economic Development
- Police Department

== Other entities ==
- City Water, Light & Power
- Lincoln Library
- Springfield, Illinois Convention & Visitors Bureau
