= Zachary Ying and the Dragon Emperor =

2022 novel by Xiran Jay Zhao

- Cover illustration by Xiao Tong "Velinxi" Kong and cover design by Karyn Lee
- Author: Xiran Jay Zhao
- Language: English
- Series: Zachary Ying, #1
- Genre: Science fiction
- Publisher: Margaret K. McElderry Books
- Publication date: 10 May 2022
- Publication place: Canada
- Pages: 352
- ISBN: 978-1665900706

Zachary Ying and the Dragon Emperor is a 2022 Canadian middle grade contemporary fantasy novel by Xiran Jay Zhao. The book follows Zachary Ying, a Chinese American and Hui Muslim boy on his journey to save China from a horde of ancient spirits while being guided by the spirit of Qin Shi Huang, the first emperor of China. It is the first book in the series.

== Background ==
Zachary Ying and the Dragon Emperor, Xiran Jay Zhao's second novel, was released on 10 May 2022. In an interview with CBC, Zhao highlighted their fascination with "genre crossovers". Zhao stated that:

I had the idea to riff off of Yu-Gi-Oh, which was a really formative media franchise when I was growing up. I got the idea of the First Emperor of China, which I was really obsessed with because his story is so fascinating. What if he possessed a little kid and then sent him to China on an adventure? [...] Yu-Gi-Oh does a lot of crossover between technology and magic, so that's what I did in Zachary Ying and the Dragon Emperor. The First Emperor possesses this kid's AR gaming headset [...]. So then I basically wrote a book based on that.

Zhao also commented that they put the lead character Zachary through similar microaggressions and racism that they had experienced at the age of twelve when they were the only Asian student in their school. Zhao stated it took many years to "unpack" that experience and that "in writing this book, I really do hope to maybe do some of that unpacking for future generations so they don't have as rough of an adolescence as I did".

=== Audiobook edition ===
In June 2022, Zhao announced that the publisher would be rerecording the audiobook with a new voice actor as the Mandarin in the book is mispronounced. The original audiobook edition will remain for sale while rerecording occurs; Zhao stated: "I've been assured that buyers of it will get the new version automatically after it comes out". Zhao also commented that, "I have to stress that I do not blame the VA for taking the job [...]. They clearly worked hard on the audiobook and gave a great performance, it's just a shame about the Mandarin".

== Plot ==
Zachary Ying is a 12-year-old boy whose mother fled China after the death of his father to escape a dangerous political situation. His now single mother was absolutely devoted to Zach, and did everything she could to provide for him, though this often meant working multiple jobs to keep their small family afloat. As a result of her busy schedule, and a desire to help Zach assimilate into western culture, Zach was raised without much knowledge of China's history, culture, or language. Despite that absence, he is often singled out for being the one Asian kid in school, and so does his best to distance himself from anything that might make him seem more other than he already feels. So when a strange boy of Asian descent approaches Zach in school and wants to tell Zach all about Qin Shi Huang, the first emperor of China, Zach is standoffish and suspicious. Later during an unexpectedly hostile confrontation between the new boy, Simon, and Zach's so-called friends, Zach abruptly becomes aware that he is being possessed by the spirit of Qin Shi Huang, the legendary first emperor of China. Qin Shi Huang explains that this is possible because Zach is Qin Shi Huang's direct descendant, and that he needs Zach's help to help prevent a catastrophe that could destroy China and possibly the world. Without meaning to, Zach forcibly exorcises the spirit of Qin Shi Huang, and flees. Without a mortal host, Qin Shi Huang's spirit is almost forced to return to the spirit world, but realizes in time that Zach's AR Headset, his "XY Technologies Portal-lens", is sophisticated enough to act as a host, allowing Qin Shi Huang's spirit to remain on the mortal plane.

Through the portal-lens, Qin Shi Huang is able to explain to Zach that spirits from the underworld are trying to force their way into the mortal world, and in 14 days, they'll be able to break through, possess any mortal they choose, and unleash all of the worst weapons humanity has access to. Zach must team up with two other 12-year olds who host Tang Taizong and Wu Zetian to learn about his heritage in order to master the power of the Emperor's legend. Only with their combined spirit powers can they complete their epic quest across China to seal the spirit plug, and prevent the spirits from breaking free.

== Reception ==
Zachary Ying debuted as a New York Times Bestseller, at number four on the Children's Middle Grade Hardcover list. It remained on the list for two weeks.

Rachel Brooks, for Publishers Weekly, commented that, "Gamer Zachary Ying desperately wants to fit in outside the virtual world of Mythrealm, but as the only Asian kid in his largely white Maine town, he finds himself quietly suffering microaggressions and peer pressure to avoid standing out. Zack's Chinese family is also Hui Muslim, a minority among other Chinese and Muslim people, but he knows little about his family legacy outside of his father's execution by the Chinese government for speaking out against its 'oppression of Uighur Muslims and other minorities.' [...] Compact history lessons woven throughout guide Zack through the plot and into a greater understanding of his identity, while plentiful pop culture references root this fantastical read in the contemporary, making for a quickly paced book that's by turns educational, reflective, and thrilling".

Kristin Brynsvold, for the School Library Journal, called Zachary Ying a "creative, engaging story" and highlighted that the novel appeals "to fans of ancient mythology and world history". Brynsvold wrote that "the plot will draw readers in, but what will keep them is Zach's struggle to belong, his journey to find himself and discover real friendship, as well as the highlighting of underrepresented mythologies. While the folklore and history might not be as smoothly incorporated as other mythological fantasies, it's done well enough that middle grade readers won't mind".

Alec Scott, for The Globe and Mail, compared Zachary Ying to Zhao's first novel Iron Widow (2021) and commented that "the two books speak to Zhao's obsessions – both with anime, the visual storytelling popularized in Japan that's gone global, and with Chinese history and mythology. [...] In both novels, the mythic past gets translated into the future. [...] But these similarities are superficial: The first book is a primal scream brimming with horror at the world its young heroine inherits, while the new novel plots a tween's journey from zero to, if not hero, then someone of substance. [...] For all their differences of mood, the novels rescue what is valuable to Zhao in Chinese history and myth, and project it forward – creating artistic acts of cultural reappropriation".

Zachary Ying was included on Entertainment Weekly's 2022 "11 exciting books for your kids' summer reading list" — the article states: "weaving Chinese history in with questions about identity and belonging, kids will zip through this action-packed novel by Xiran Jay Zhao as they cheer on Zachary in his heroic quest". AudioFile highlighted the audiobook edition in May 2022 and stated that the narrator, Neo Cihi, "switches seamlessly between English and Chinese and helps listeners feel all the tension as the high-intensity adventure ramps up".
