= Harmonie Club (Detroit) =

- The Harmonie Club
- U.S. National Register of Historic Places
- Michigan State Historic Site
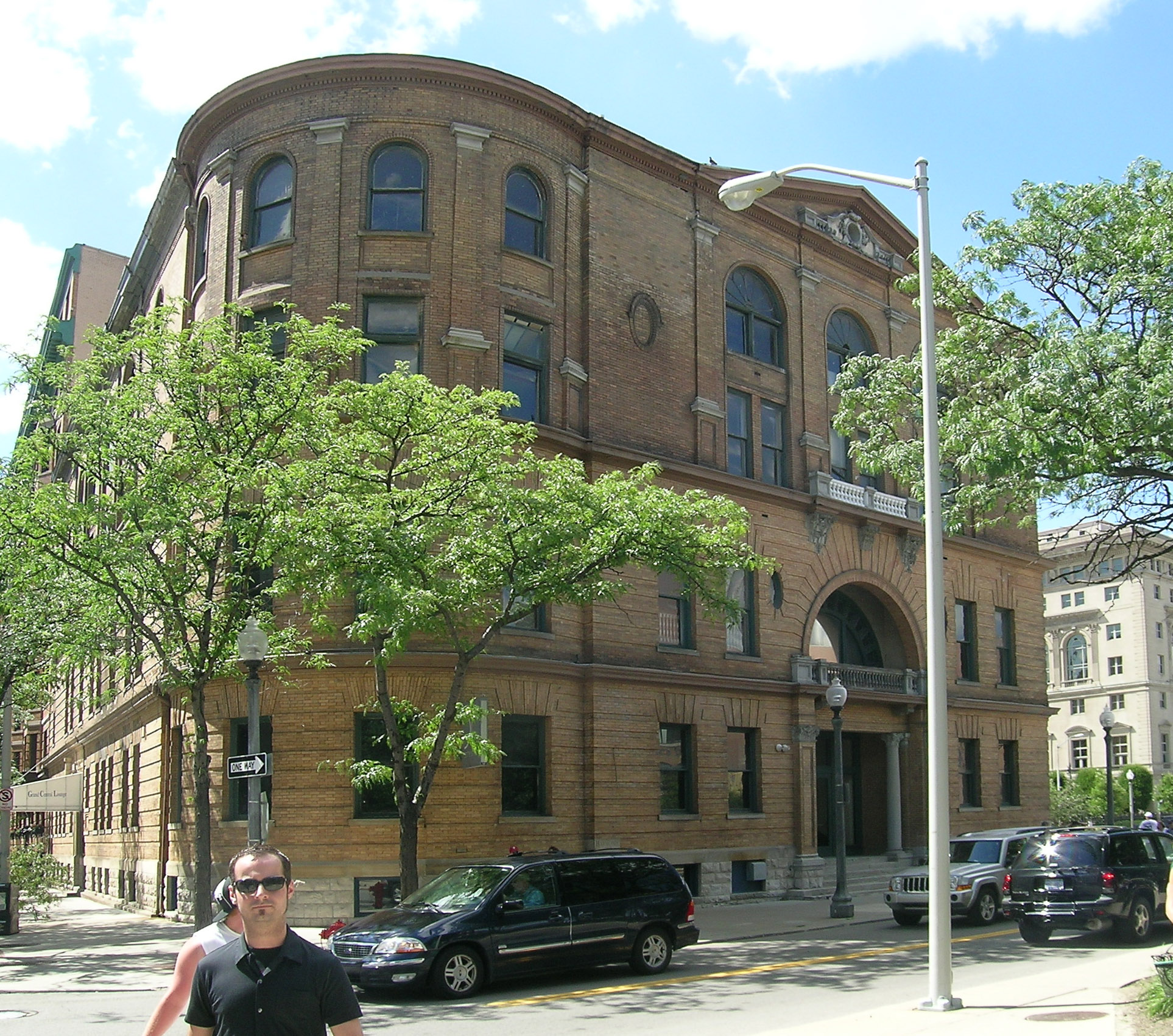
- The Harmonie Club from the south
- Interactive map
- Location: 311 East Grand River Avenue; Detroit, Michigan
- Coordinates: 42°20′11″N 83°2′48″W
- Built: 1894
- Architect: Richard E. Raseman
- Architectural style: Beaux-Arts
- NRHP reference No.: 80001924

Significant dates
- Added to NRHP: September 4, 1980
- Designated MSHS: October 21, 1975

The Harmonie Club is a club located at 311 East Grand River Avenue in Downtown Detroit, Michigan. It was designated a Michigan State Historic Site in 1975 and listed on the National Register of Historic Places in 1980.

== History ==
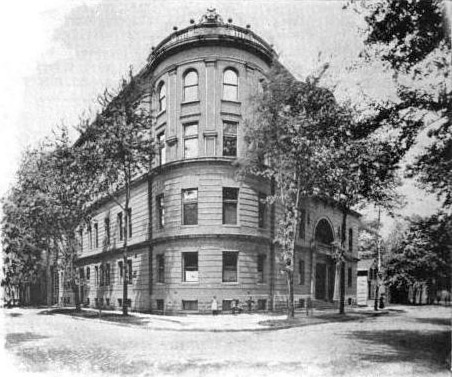
Harmonie Club in 1899

Augustus Woodward's plan for Detroit's streets created uniquely-shaped triangular blocks, including Capitol Park on the west and Harmonie Park on the east. Starting in the 1830s and 1940s, this area was home to a growing number of German immigrants to Detroit. In 1849, to preserve their ethnic traditions, a group of Detroit Germans founded a singing group, the Gesang-Verein Harmonie. The club built a frame clubhouse at the corner of Lafayette and Beaubien in 1874. This frame Harmonie Club structure burned in 1893, and the club almost immediately organized a competition, open to German architects, to design a new building. Richard Raseman (the architect of the Grand Army of the Republic Building) won the competition; the resulting building sits across from Harmonie Park.

== Architecture ==
The Harmonie Club is a four-story, hipped-roof building with a basement, built of buff-colored brick and stone. The curved corner is particularly shaped to the geometry of the site. The first two stories are embellished with stonework, and the top two stories feature additional banding and arched windows on the top floor. Corinthian columns and a balustraded balcony over the entry add a classical feel. The interior of the club features classical plasterwork, dark oak paneling and Pewabic tile. The club also offered fine dining, a tavern, card rooms, bowling alley and lounges.

== Current use ==
Over time, membership in the Harmonie Club dwindled, and the club was sold in 1974. The building remained vacant until the 1990s. In 2007, the city of Detroit planned a cultural district around Harmonie Park, to include the Harmonie Club. The club was recognized as an historical property by the state of Michigan in 1975, was placed on the National Register of Historic Places in 1980, and was recognized by the city of Detroit in 1988.

In 2024 it was the venue for the Detroit Bridgerton Themed Ball, an event that went viral online for issues resulting from its poor planning and high cost. Responding to this, the owners of the Harmonie Club made a statement that "the historic Harmonie Club is a new venue", that they were "in no way affiliated with the promoters and/or organisations that rent our venue", which in this case was Uncle & Me LLC, and that "the planning, programming, and execution of the actual events are handled by the venue lessees, promoters, and their teams".

== See also ==
- Harmonie Centre
- Music of Detroit
