= Detroit Bridgerton Themed Ball =

Unlicensed event in Detroit, Michigan

- Date: 22 September 2024
- Venue: Harmonie Club
- Location: Detroit, Michigan; 42°20′11″N 83°2′48″W
- Theme: Bridgerton
- Organised by: Uncle & Me LLC
- Website: detroitbridgertonball.com

The Detroit Bridgerton Themed Ball was an event in Detroit, Michigan, on September 22, 2024, which was themed around the Netflix show Bridgerton. Originally advertised as "an evening of sophistication, grace, and historical charm" by its organizer Uncle & Me LLC, renamed UM Event Management LLC after, the event went viral on the internet and news media after its poor planning and high cost led to some attendees and commentators describing it as a "scam". It was compared to other events such as Willy's Chocolate Experience, Fyre Festival and DashCon.

== Background ==
The event was organized by Uncle & Me LLC, a company co-owned by Chelsea Beard. The company had put on similar Bridgerton-themed events in the past, including one at the Taylor Conservatory & Botanical Gardens with some attendees similarly disappointed with the event.

These events were based on Bridgerton, a Netflix TV series set in English high society in the early 1800s. An unrelated "Bridgerton Experience", which was in fact authorized by Netflix, had also toured the country.

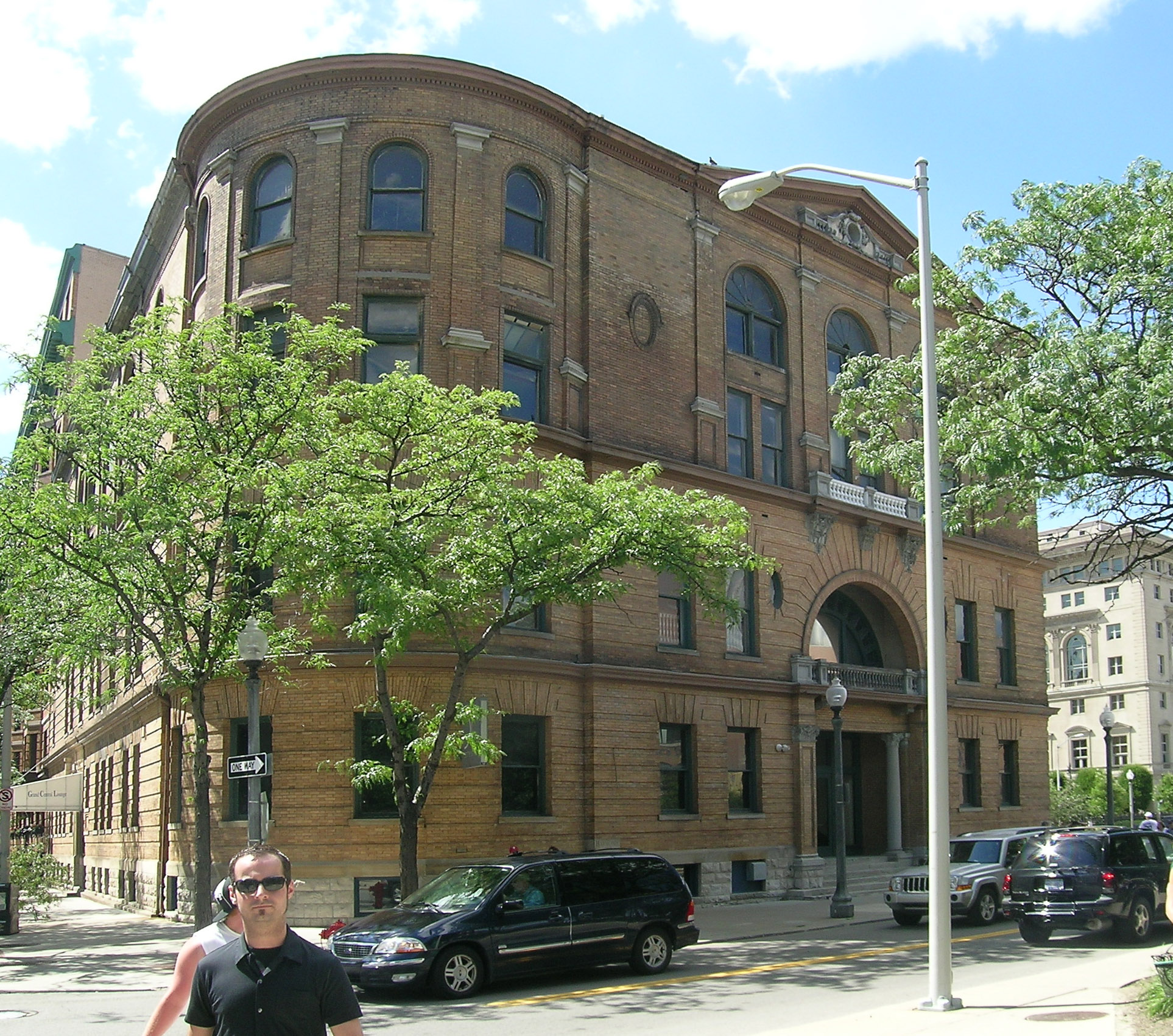
The Harmonie Club, the venue for the event

The event itself was located at the Harmonie Club in Detroit, Michigan. Originally advertised on Instagram, it promised "dancing, live entertainment, exquisite refreshments, and enchanting surprise." Promotion of the event included the promise of live music and ballroom dancing, during "an evening of sophistication, grace, and historical charm" with "music, dance, and exquisite costumes", and that there would be a full orchestra. The itinerary for the "ball" included dance lessons, photo opportunities and a fashion show; the event's website promised a prize of $2,000 for the "Diamond of the Season", the best dressed person, in reference to an award in the series. Tickets ranged in cost from $150 to $1,000, with some paying for a "Duke and Duchess" package which was to include a valet service, dinner, and music.

== Event ==
The event began on the evening of September 22, 2024. Many attendees dressed up for the event in accordance with its dress code. Such attendees included a couple who had eloped the day prior. Some attendees who had paid for the "Duke and Duchess" package had to pay for their own parking without a valet service as promised, and there was nobody at the door of the venue to greet guests.

At the event, the rooms were largely left empty and there were no period-accurate furnishings; the remaining decor, which appeared to include floral arrangements from Party City, was described as "extremely tacky". Food served at the event included noodles with tomato sauce and small chicken wings. This food was allegedly not cooked properly and was served by staff wearing sports jerseys, though this food ran out within the event's first hour. Forbes reported that there were "tables overflowing with discarded food", as a result of nobody being there to clean up after the guests. Some attendees claimed that raw chicken was being served, and that plastic cups at the event were being reused. One attendee said that staff had never scanned her tickets.

Musical entertainment at the event was composed of a single violinist, who had to perform across the three floors that the event spanned. A pole dancer, named Tink the Fairy, was hired three hours before the event started; event organizers chose for her to do pole dancing rather than her hair suspension, lyra hoop, or aerial sling routines. She later noted in an interview that the organizers had been "very professional" on the phone, and that she had been paid $800 in total for the evening. She was told to "do character work" between her three-stage performances, during which she danced to two songs from Bridgerton played over the speakers as well as "Moves like Jagger" by Maroon 5 for her final set. There were no dance lessons at the scheduled time. At one point, the speakers played music by rapper Soulja Boy.

One attendee alleged that a Queen Charlotte act, a character from Bridgerton, was also in attendance for attendees to take photos with. However, she was dressed in a costume which attendees said looked like it had been "purchased at a dollar store", had a "fake stuffed dog" on her lap, and spent her time handing out business cards and telling people to follow her on social media. Another attraction were a pair of thrones on which attendees could have their photo taken for an extra $40, with the photographer only able to AirDrop the photos to them, meaning Android users could only take photos of his phone.

Attendees largely ended up sitting on the floor and charging their phones, and the promised $2,000 cash prize for the best dressed person was not handed out. Tink later noted in an interview that the event coordinator appeared "very anxious" and that she "gave her a lot of hugs". Over 60 of the attendees left early.

== Responses ==
Several Twitter threads concerning the event went viral. Some attendees, social media commentators and news sites referred to the event as a "scam". A Facebook group named "Bridgerton Ball Scam — Detroit" was created in which attendees made efforts to organize a class action lawsuit and several noted that they had filed reports with the Detroit Police Department. Comparisons were made by social media users to the similarly unsuccessful Willy's Chocolate Experience.

On the afternoon of September 24, Uncle & Me released a statement to WXYZ-TV, writing that "We understand that not everyone had the experience they hoped for," that it "sincerely apologize[d]", and its "intention was to provide a magical evening, but we recognize that organizational challenges affected the enjoyment of some guests. We take full responsibility and accountability for these shortcomings." The statement also noted that the business was "reviewing resolution options". Chelsea Beard also posted the statement in the caption of an Instagram reel, further noting that the "organizational challenges and unforeseen changes" included "a last-minute venue and date change" as well as "some nonrefundable deposits from the original bookings [which] resulted in losses on our end". Both the company's website and the event website were taken down; as of 28 September, attendees said they had had no contact with the company for days.

The owners of the Harmonie Club also released a statement distancing themselves from Uncle & Me, stating that they were "in no way affiliated with the promoters and/or organizations that rent our venue for events", and that "planning, programming, and execution of the actual events are handled by the venue lessees, promoters, and their teams."

The Guardian argued that the event seemed to be the result of "good old-fashioned human error. It was overpriced and cheaply produced. It was badly organized and terribly executed." The New York Times compared it to Willy's Chocolate Experience, in that both were "a terrible event that was poorly planned, way too expensive and ultimately a big downer".
