= President Abraham Lincoln Hotel =

DoubleTree hotel in Springfield, Illinois, US

Coordinates: 39°48′03.3″N 89°38′45.0″W

President Abraham Lincoln Springfield - a DoubleTree by Hilton Hotel
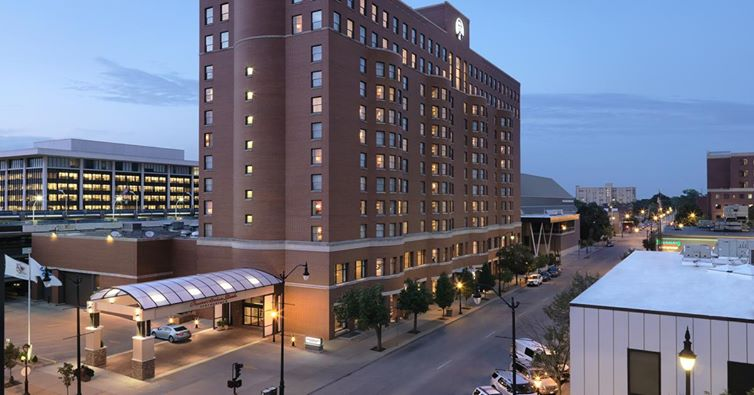
- Interactive map of the President Abraham Lincoln Springfield - a DoubleTree by Hilton Hotel area
- Former names: Ramada Renaissance, Renaissance Hotel, President Abraham Lincoln Hotel and Conference Center
- Hotel chain: Hilton Worldwide

General information
- Type: Hotel
- Location: 701 East Adams Street, Springfield, Illinois 62701, (United States)
- Construction started: 1984
- Completed: 1985

Height
- Roof: 44.81 m (147 ft)

Technical details
- Floor count: 12

Design and construction
- Architects: Nagle Hartray and Associates

Other information
- Number of rooms: 310
- Public transit: SMTD

The President Abraham Lincoln Springfield - a DoubleTree by Hilton Hotel, is a hotel in Springfield, Illinois.

It is the only hotel connected to the nearby Bank of Springfield Convention Center, via a tunnel. Because of this, it was able to be financed through loans backed by the State of Illinois. That fact would later be important when the loans were defaulted.

When the hotel opened in 1985, it was known as the Ramada Renaissance, then changed names two decades later to the President Abraham Lincoln Hotel & Conference Center in 2005. It became part of the DoubleTree by Hilton franchise chain eight years later in 2013.

== History ==
The Springfield Metropolitan Exposition and Auditorium Authority (SMEAA) began planning to build a convention center in Springfield in the early 1970s. It would later become first known as the Prairie Capital Convention Center, and ground was broken in mid 1975. Prior the ground breaking, proposals were sought for a hotel to be adjacent to the center. Of the 11 companies interested in the project, only two submitted plans. In March 1979, New Frontier Development submitted the winning bid to build the 300-room hotel, at approximately $10 million. Early discussions indicated that an air rights leasing deal would be made with the hotel, with rent of $120,000 per year and an exclusive catering contract with the center. The Center opened in the fall of 1979.

New Frontier Development, headed by William F. Cellini (born 1934), created a subsidiary company known as President Lincoln Venture to fund the building development of the hotel in downtown Springfield adjacent to the earlier convention center. President Lincoln Hotel Venture borrowed about $24 million to build and furnish the hotel. That money included the $15.5 million of Illinois state-backed mortgage, the $3.1 million dollars low-interest loan from the city of Springfield through a federal urban development grant (U.D.A.G.), and about $5.4 million borrowed by President Lincoln Hotel Venture from the Lyons Trust and Savings Bank of nearby Hinsdale, Illinois. In addition, the hotel developers invested about $7 million of their own money.

Initial plans were for the Springfield hotel to be affiliated with the Radisson Hotel chain. However, in April 1983, the decision was made to change the affiliation to Ramada, and its more upscale Ramada Renaissance Hotels brand. Construction began in February 1984, and Jones-Blythe, of Springfield was the general construction contractor and the architect was Nagle Hartray and Associates of Chicago.

=== Opening ===
The grand opening of the Ramada Renaissance Hotel was held on Friday, August 30, 1985. The then 37th and longtime, now legendary Governor of Illinois, James R. ("Big Jim") Thompson (1936–2020, served 1977–1991), along with numerous other federal, state and local government officials and leading business and cultural leaders in the state, were among those attending at the Springfield hotel dedication ceremony.

The new center of hospitality was furnished with some unique decorative features, such as marble floors which were imported from Italy. So was the Venetian / Murano-glass chandelier—the glass was originally manufactured on an island off-shore from Venice. The Axminster carpet came from being woven in Great Britain.

At the time of the 1985 opening, the hotel featured two restaurants and two bars. Lindsay's Gallery, one of the two restaurants was named in honor of noted Springfield poet Vachel Lindsay (1879–1931). Displayed at the entrance to the restaurant was an 8-foot rendition of Lindsay's 1913 painting, "The Wedding of the Rose and the Lotus."

The hotel's other restaurant was the Floreale Room. It featured Northern Italian style cuisine and was named after the Italian word for "the flower." That restaurant closed in August 1997. The Globe Tavern, an upper-level bar, is named after the famous Springfield inn where Abraham Lincoln would have occasionally stopped and stayed.

Two special suites were furnished with rare antiques and currently cost $275 per night. Guest rooms started originally at $65 per night. The average construction cost of the 320-room, $28.5 million Ramada Renaissance hotel was about $89,000 per room.

=== Problems with debt ===
While the hotel made payments to its state loan initially, it fell behind in payments just two years after opening. In 1990, the state restructured the loan to require payments only when the hotel made a profit. In 1997 regular payments stopped; two payments of less than $143,000 were made in 2002.

In February 1997, Marriott Hotels & Resorts chain bought the Renaissance chain, dropping the word Ramada from the Springfield hotel's name. However, Marriott failed to renew the local franchise agreement eight years later in 2005, and the hotel name was then changed to the President Abraham Lincoln Hotel and Conference Center.

The state of Illinois foreclosed on the property in 2008. Principal and interest owed to the state totaled $30 million, according to the state treasurer's office. The state treasurer's office then took over the property as part of foreclosure proceedings. A court-appointed receiver, of the Hostmark Hospitality Group, formally took over operations of the now 23-years old establishment now renamed for three years as the President Abraham Lincoln Hotel and Conference Center, prompting then 40th Illinois Governor Rod Blagojevich (born 1956, served 2003–2009), to lift a previous ban on state employees staying overnight there. The state then spent an additional $375,000 on repairs and up-grading improvements, including new furnishings and mattress replacements.

=== Sale to Horve ===
In 2009, the state put the hotel up for sale, there were five bidders. Steve Horve, whose family also owns hotels in Decatur, Forsyth and Champaign, as well as one in Dearborn, Mich., submitted a successful bid of $6.5 million for the 315-room hotel.

The sale was finalized in January 2010, and Mr. Horve began improvements to the hotel within a few months. The renovations took nearly 2 years, and included replacing all the laundry equipment.

In 2013, the hotel joined Hilton Worldwide, as a DoubleTree by Hilton property. The name of the hotel was "soft branded" as The President Abraham Lincoln Hotel, a DoubleTree by Hilton. Around the same time, the Prairie Capital Convention Center finished a two-year upgrade to its facilities.

=== Sale to Al Habtoor Group ===
Al Habtoor Group, headed by multi-billionaire Khalaf Ahmad al Habtoor, made an unsolicited bid to buy the hotel in October 2014. Horve decided to sell the hotel to concentrate on his other hotel projects, including construction of a Home 2 extended-stay hotel by Hilton in Champaign. According to the Sangamon County recorder's office, Al Habtoor paid $9.3 million.

== Former Lincoln Hotel (1926–1964 / 1978) ==
This is the second hotel in Springfield to be named after the hometown boy and 16th President. Another 13-story hotel, known as the Abraham Lincoln Hotel (fondly nicknamed "Old Abe's"), opened in 1926 and closed for business only 38 years later in June 1964. It was torn down in a controlled implosion demolition on December 17, 1978. The landmark building was supposedly destroyed to make way for a city and state courts complex in the late 1970s, which never materialized. To this day, the old Lincoln Hotel downtown site remains a vacant lot and undeveloped.

== Facilities and amenities ==
The building is 12 stories, and contains 310 guest rooms. The layout of the floors is:

- The first floor (street level) contains the lobby, front desk, a small gift shop. It also has the Presidential Ballroom, Lindsay's Restaurant (breakfast), The Globe Tavern (lunch and dinner), and the Lincoln meeting room.
- The second floor contains meeting rooms, and the hotel's executive offices. It is connected to the first floor via a grand staircase.
- Floors 3 through 12 are guest floors.
- The Concourse level includes the Fitness Center (open 24 hours), an indoor swimming pool, and a tunnel which connects directly to the Convention Center.
