= Bank of Springfield Center =

Arena in Illinois, United States

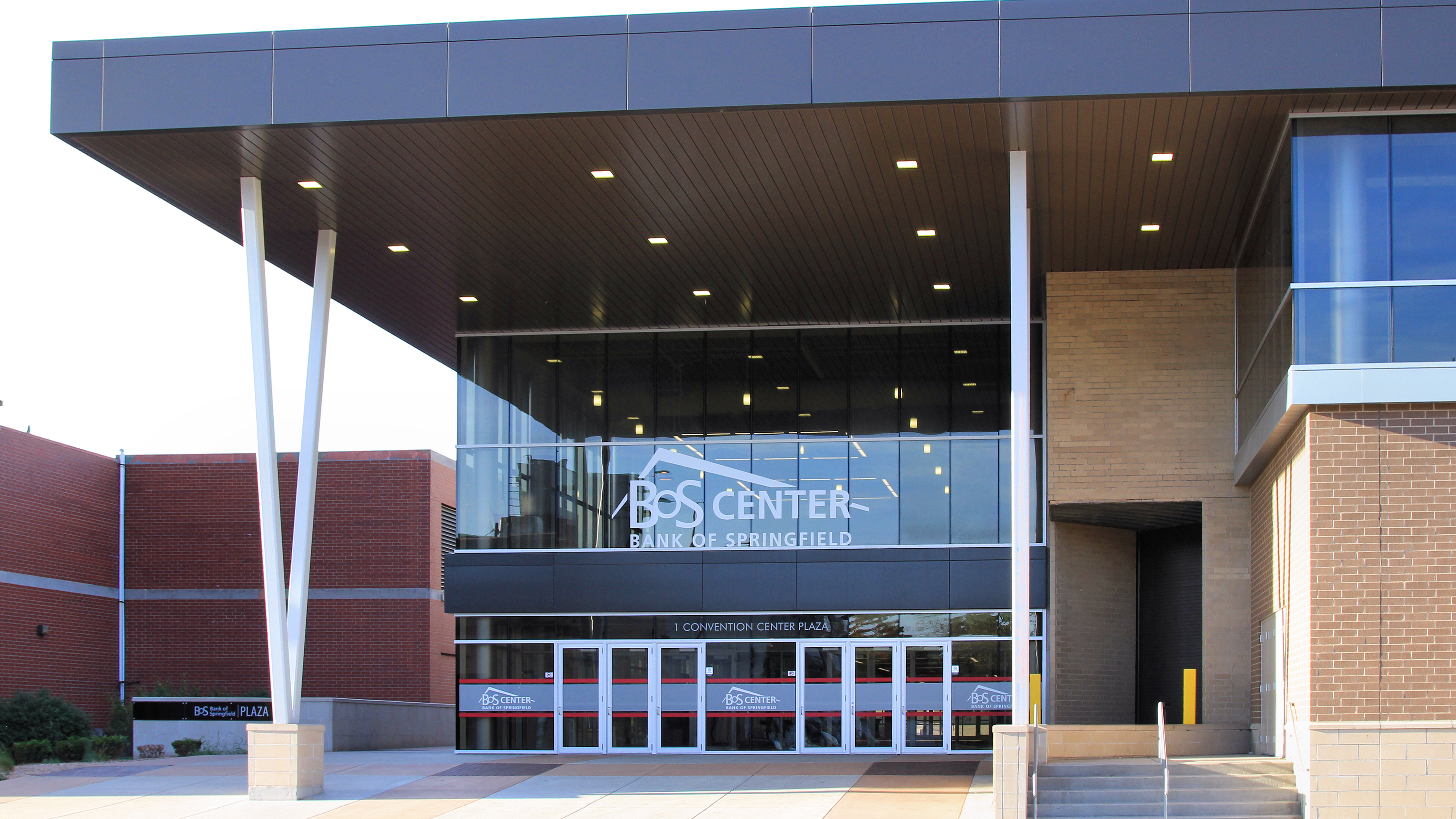

- Location within Illinois
- Former names: Prairie Capital Convention Center (1979–2017)
- Location: 1 Convention Center Plaza, Springfield, Illinois, United States
- Coordinates: 39°48′3.24″N 89°38′39.84″W
- Owner: Springfield Metropolitan Exposition and Auditorium Authority
- Capacity: 7,700
- Surface: multi-surface
- Record attendance: 10,200
- Public transit: SMTD

Construction
- Opened: October 1979
- Renovated: 2011–2013

Tenants
- Illinois Express (WBL) (1989–1990); Springfield Stallions (CIFL) (2007)

Website
- theboscenter.com

The Bank of Springfield Center (originally the Prairie Capital Convention Center) is a 7,700-seat multi-purpose arena located in Springfield, Illinois.

The facility is adaptable to host a variety of events, including large concerts, theatrical performances, trade shows, sporting events, and school graduation ceremonies, as well as smaller gatherings such as professional training meetings, weddings and banquets.

The facility contains 44,000 square feet (4,100 m^{2}) of column-free space in the main hall and 21,000 square feet (2,000 m^{2}) of meeting room space in the lower level. It connects, via tunnel, to the President Abraham Lincoln Hotel.

== History ==
It was built in 1978 and is operated by the Springfield Metropolitan Exposition and Auditorium Authority (SMEAA).

The arena hosts local concerts and sporting events for the area and is the former home of the Illinois Express of the World Basketball League and the Springfield Stallions indoor football team.

Concerts held at Prairie Capital Convention Center include Ozzy Osbourne with opening act Def Leppard (1981), and Ted Nugent (1982).

Prairie Capital Convention Center underwent a renovation between 2011–2014 to modernize its facilities and expand the types of events it can accommodate. This transformation included extensive expansion of the lobby by 6,000 square feet (560 m^{2}), the addition of the outdoor BOS Plaza, additional concessions areas, an upper-level patio terrace, and two upper-level terrace areas.

In November 2015, the arena hosted the Illinois Fighting Illini men's basketball team for five games while renovations to the State Farm Center were completed. College wrestling tournaments have also been held at the convention center.

Also in November 2015, Donald Trump held a rally in the Prairie Capital Convention Center for 10,000 supporters, which according to Trump, was the largest turnout in the facility's history.

On June 5, 2017, the SMEAA announced that it approved an agreement to sell the naming rights for the facility to the Bank of Springfield for ten years.

In January 2021, the Illinois House of Representatives convened in the arena rather than the State Capitol in order to maintain social distancing during the COVID-19 pandemic.

== See also ==
- List of convention centers in the United States
