= Willy's Chocolate Experience =

2024 event in Glasgow, Scotland

- One of the AI-generated advertisements used for the event, with uncorrected spelling errors and nonsensical words

- Date: 24 February 2024
- Venue: Box Hub Warehouse
- Location: Glasgow, Scotland; 55°52′21″N 4°20′26″W
- Theme: Charlie and the Chocolate Factory
- Organised by: House of Illuminati
- Website: willyschocolateexperience.com at the Wayback Machine (archived 2024-02-25)

Willy's Chocolate Experience was an unlicensed event based on Charlie and the Chocolate Factory that took place in Glasgow, Scotland, in February 2024, and gained worldwide notoriety for its poor execution. The event was advertised as an immersive and interactive family experience, illustrated on a promotional website with "dreamlike" AI-generated imagery. Visitors arrived to find a sparsely decorated warehouse, staffed by performers who had been left to improvise from an incoherent script and with inadequate props. Tension rose as visitors demanded refunds from the event's proprietor, and police were called to the venue. Willy's Chocolate Experience was cancelled after a matter of hours.

The event attracted Internet and media attention globally, and was the subject of a documentary commissioned by Channel 5. It drew comparisons to the 2008 Lapland New Forest controversy, the 2014 Tumblr fan convention DashCon, and Billy McFarland's 2017 Fyre Festival.

== Background and advertising ==
An AI-generated image of the Twilight Tunnel, with a larger number of nonsensical words.

The event was stated to take place over the weekend of 24–25 February 2024. Promotional material advertised "stunning and intricately designed settings inspired by Roald Dahl's timeless tale" and "an array of delectable treats scattered throughout the experience". Both the website and promotional material used poor-quality AI-generated images, which included several spelling errors such as "cartchy tuns" and "a pasadise of sweet teats" and nonsensical words such as "catgacating" and "exarserdray". Tickets cost up to £35 per person. While the event was being promoted in early February, a Reddit user who saw Facebook advertisements suspected it to be a scam and was surprised that people were apparently buying tickets based solely on AI-generated images.

The event was organised by House of Illuminati, a company registered to Billy Coull which claimed to offer "unparalleled immersive experiences". An investigation by Third Force News conducted after the event described Coull's previous "murky involvement in the charity sector." Coull had previously registered several other companies and claimed to work as a "consultant" for the now-defunct brand Empowerity, formerly known as the charity Gowanbank Community Hub. In 2021, Gowanbank was forced to remove claims of a £95-per-ticket fundraising "gala" at DoubleTree Glasgow which had been falsely advertised to feature TV personalities and performers including Gok Wan and Joe Black. Coull had claimed to be a doctor with a fake degree from a false university that provided "metaphysical degrees", and had attempted to use the charity to win the 2022 Glasgow City Council election in the seat of Greater Pollok, though he never registered for the election. In the summer of 2023, he independently published 17 AI-generated books on various topics, including vaccine conspiracy theories. Rolling Stone concluded that House of Illuminati's websites and event descriptions were likely written by an AI chatbot, such as ChatGPT.

Three actors were hired to portray "Willy McDuff", a character based on Willy Wonka. One of them, Paul Connell, said that the cast were given one day to learn the script. Another actor playing Willy McDuff was 18-year-old Michael Archibald; the experience was his first ever acting job, and he was given the script at 6 pm on Friday before the event began on Saturday.

Kirsty Paterson, an actress who played one of the Oompa-Loompas (called "Wonkidoodles" in the script), said that the job offer had been posted on Indeed.com and offered £500 for two days of work. The day before the event, the actors attended a dress rehearsal at the sparsely decorated venue. They were told that others would be working through the night on the production. When they returned on the day of the event, the venue was in the same condition. Actress Jenny Fogarty was given her costume an hour before the event opened, saying that "We were just handed an Amazon box that probably arrived that morning."

== Script ==
The script for the event is titled Wonkidoodles at McDuff's Chocolate Factory: A Script, and describes Willy McDuff leading an audience through the Garden of Enchantment and the Twilight Tunnel. Once there, they are confronted by a character called The Unknown, described as "an evil chocolate maker who lives in the walls" who seeks to steal the magical "Anti-Graffiti Gobstopper" from McDuff's Imagination Lab. The gobstopper is "a sweet so powerful, it can make any room sparkle without lifting a finger". McDuff defeats The Unknown by amplifying the power of the gobstopper and causing his enemy to be "gently swept up by a robotic vacuum, humorously ending the confrontation".

The script was unusual in that it included stage directions for the audience, and descriptions of their reactions. Connell described it as "15 pages of AI-generated gibberish of me just monologuing these mad things", and compared the vacuum cleaner plot point to that of the Nintendo video game Luigi's Mansion. Interviewed after the event, Coull claimed to have written the script himself, using AI only to "check spelling, grammar, and continuity" as he said he had dyslexia.

== Event ==
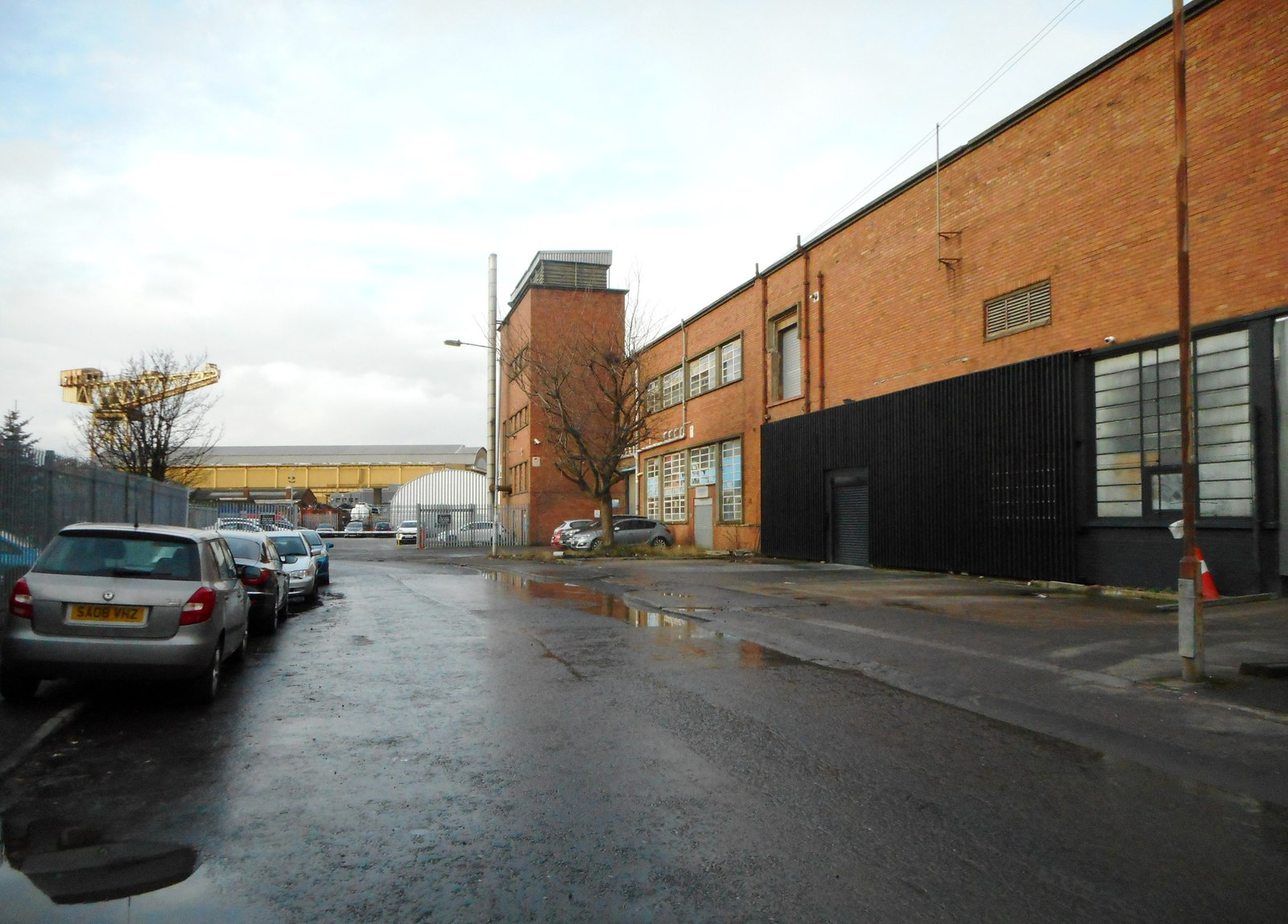
The building of which the Box Hub Warehouse is a part, on the Clydeside Industrial Estate (pictured in 2019)

The interior of the Box Hub Warehouse where the event took place. The set design was heavily criticised for its poor quality and for not matching the expectations of the advertisements.

The event was held at the Box Hub Warehouse event space in Whiteinch, an industrial area of Glasgow. Customers described the venue as "little more than an abandoned, empty warehouse", with set dressings including a small bouncy castle, AI-generated backdrop images pinned to some of the walls, and props which were "strewn about on bare concrete floors". The venue's windows were dirty and its air conditioning systems were left exposed. Paterson has stated that by the time she saw the venue, she had already signed her contract and "didn't want to disappoint the kids", and thus chose to proceed with the work.

The Unknown was played by a 16-year-old actress named Felicia Dawkins, who wore a silver mask and a black cloak. Young children were frightened by the character, who appeared from behind a large rectangular mirror. Despite the script calling for The Unknown to be defeated with a vacuum cleaner, no such prop was provided, and actors were instead asked to improvise.

Connell said that he and other employees were told to give each child "two jelly beans and a quarter of a cup of lemonade", although the limited supply of jelly beans quickly ran out. "Wonkidoodle" actors Paterson and Fogarty said that after the first three 45-minute performances, the cast were told to abandon the script and instead let guests walk through the venue, a process that Paterson said took "about two minutes". The character of The Unknown, previously introduced as the main antagonist, was now "scaring children for no reason". One of the actors playing McDuff improvised the idea that children should pull a "silly face" at The Unknown to scare them away, but Dawkins said that, in other cases, she "just had to awkwardly walk back to [her] corner".

Connell was told he would be given a 15-minute break every 45 minutes, but on the day of the event, he played Willy McDuff for three and a half hours without a break. After returning from a lunch break, Connell encountered a crowd of customers demanding refunds from Coull, and the other actors were unsure what to do next. After being told that the event was now cancelled halfway through its opening day, the actors left and went to a pub. Upon returning to the venue some time later, Connell said that he felt "the threat of violence had become quite high" and that there were two police vans and two squad cars at the scene.

== Customer reviews and response ==
Willy's Chocolate Experience was widely criticised by those who attended it, many of whom demanded refunds. One customer, who had driven with his children for two hours to reach the event, described it as an "absolute con". Other visitors who arrived after the event was closed and were not informed of its cancellation requested compensation for wasted rail fares. Following the event's cancellation, Coull offered to refund 850 people, a statement repeated by the event's Facebook page. Some Facebook users stated that they had received their money back. Paterson and Fogarty stated that they only received half of their paycheque.

Box Hub, the organisation that had rented the warehouse to House of Illuminati, issued an apology on House of Illuminati's behalf, stating that they "either have no regards for the families and young children they have disappointed or are too embarrassed to comment", and offered to provide a venue free of charge for those who attended the event. House of Illuminati later stated that they would not host any future events.

Coull deleted his LinkedIn profile, his YouTube channel, and his personal website in response to the controversy. A few days after the event, Connell said he felt that Coull was "probably one of the most disliked people in Glasgow right now". In an interview with The Sunday Times, Coull apologised for how the event turned out, saying he would accept responsibility.

== Fundraising ==
In an interview with Wired magazine, Connell stated that he and the other actors were working with parents to provide a free show for the children who attended.

Some items from the event were later auctioned for charity. The venue auctioned the leftover hand-written "event cancelled" sign, raising £850 for a local children's hospital, while the Monorail Music record store in Glasgow auctioned two of the backdrops "rescued from the bin by a pal of the shop" for £2,250, with the proceeds going to the Medical Aid for Palestinians charity.

== In popular culture ==
A photo of a dispirited Paterson playing a "Wonkidoodle" in the "Jellybean Room" (a table covered in chemistry equipment) became a viral phenomenon. The image became a meme and was compared to a picture of a "meth lab" and to Édouard Manet's 1882 painting A Bar at the Folies-Bergère, which depicts "an alienated woman at work". The character of "The Unknown" was also featured in several memes, after appearing in a video recorded by a mother at the event, Maryanne McCormack. Some Twitter users expressed plans to dress up as the character for Halloween.

The event was spoofed on Jimmy Kimmel Live! in April 2024 in a skit called "Charlie and the Chocolate Factory Part Two", featuring Freddie Highmore, who had played Charlie Bucket in the 2005 film adaptation of the novel. In February 2025, John Oliver compared the United States Department of Government Efficiency, then headed by Elon Musk, to the event due to their "stark disconnect between marketing and reality." Felicia Dawkins and one of the actors who played Willy also appeared in the "Glasgow Willy Wonka Experience Quiz and Game Experience" in April, a night hosted by theatre company Awkwardprods at the Clapham Grand in London, featuring performers including drag queen Kate Butch.

On 6 March 2024, Keir Starmer, the leader of the Labour Party and Leader of the Opposition, joked in the House of Commons that it seemed Jeremy Hunt, the Chancellor of the Exchequer, had been taking marketing lessons from the event, in reference to Hunt's promises regarding childcare. Similarly, Conservative MP Penny Mordaunt, the leader of the House of Commons at the time, joked that she was under the impression that the Scottish National Party had organised the Glasgow event given its "high cost, poor return, and the fact that the police were called", alluding to Operation Branchform.

An hour-long documentary about the event, called Wonka: The Scandal that Rocked Britain, was commissioned by Channel 5 on 6 March 2024 and broadcast on 16 March 2024. The programme included interviews with Coull and the actors from the event; Coull stated that "I have lost my friends. I've lost the love of my life. I was made out to be the face of all evil. And genuinely, that's really not the case." He also said he had received "hundreds and hundreds [of messages] calling me the most awful names saying I'm a villain, I'm a horrific dad, I'm better off dead, I should kill myself." The documentary received 2 stars out of 5 from The Guardian, which described it as having "the strong whiff of someone vastly overexplaining the joke" and that the "only real scoop" was the interview with Coull.

Following the popularity of the event, Felicia Dawkins was offered the opportunity to train with the performance team and make a guest appearance acting in the London Dungeon, a haunted house attraction in London. A London Dungeon spokesperson said the aspiring actor who played The Unknown is "clearly a natural when it comes to the art of the scare". In April 2024, Kirsty Paterson appeared at a "Willy's Chocolate Experience LA" cocktail and performance evening. It was staged by a collective of local artists in Los Angeles, unaffiliated with the Glasgow event. Attendees were offered three jelly beans, and proceeds were donated to the National Alliance on Mental Illness. The Guardian was positive in its review of the event, noting that Paterson was severely jetlagged during her performance but asked, "how can you complain when shoddiness is the point?"

Richard Kraft produced a musical stage reading about the event for the 2024 Edinburgh Festival Fringe, including performances from the actress and comedian Riki Lindhome, the actresses Shelley Regner and Cassandra Parker, the actor Eric Petersen, the Broadway songwriters Alan Zachary and Michael Weiner, the director Andy Fickman, the Emmy Award winners Tova Litvin and Doug Rockwell, and Kirsty Paterson, who played herself and a narrator. Additionally, he recruited cast members from Willy Wonka & the Chocolate Factory Paris Themmen, who had played Mike Teevee, and Julie Dawn Cole, who had played Veruca Salt. The Stage gave it two stars, saying that "the show is self-aware enough to point out that we're watching a crappy, thrown-together piece of entertainment based on a crappy, thrown-together piece of entertainment".

Multiple subsequent events have been compared to Willy's Chocolate Experience. These include the Detroit Bridgerton Themed Ball in September 2024, Christmas Spectacular Bury St Edmunds in December 2024, the A Million Lives Book Festival in Baltimore, Maryland in May 2025, the Barbie Dream Fest in Fort Lauderdale, Florida, and The Great American State Fair in July 2026.

In September 2026, Netflix announced that Kirsty Paterson, who portrayed the sad Oompa-Loompa, will appear as an actual Oompa-Loompa in the game show, Wonka's The Golden Ticket.

== See also ==
- DashCon
- Fyre Festival
- TanaCon
- Detroit Bridgerton Themed Ball
- Barbie Dream Fest
