= Renaissance Reno =

Hotel in Nevada, United States

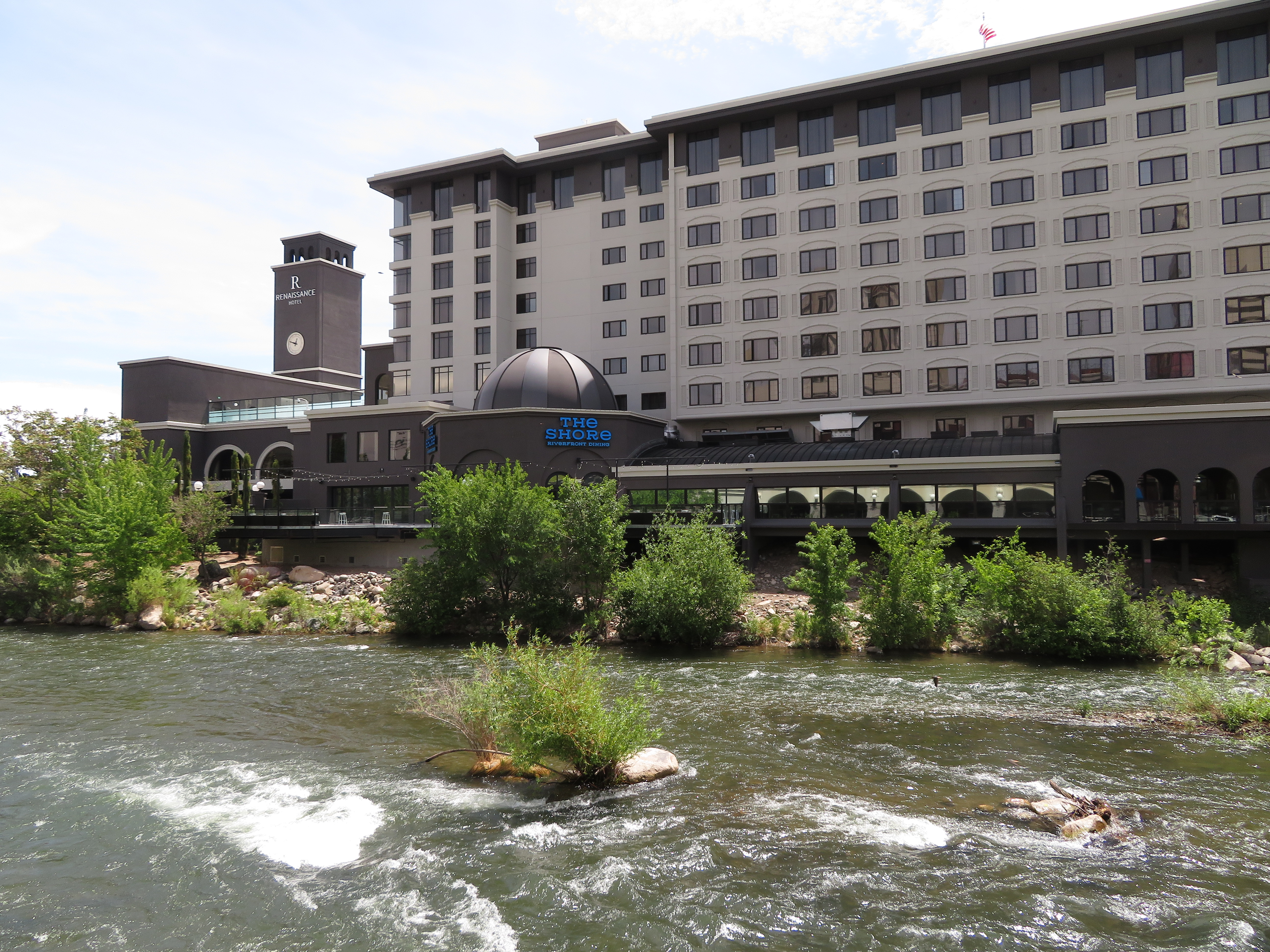
- Renaissance Reno in 2020
- Interactive map of the Renaissance Reno area
- Former names: Holiday Reno (1956–1998); Siena Reno (2001–2017)
- Hotel chain: Renaissance Hotels

General information
- Location: 1 South Lake Street, Reno, Nevada, United States
- Coordinates: 39.5252°N 119.8106°W
- Opened: 1956; 70 years ago
- Renovated: 2001; 2011; 2017
- Owner: HMRN LLC

Website
- marriott.com/hotels/travel/rnobr-renaissance-reno-downtown-hotel

The Renaissance Reno (formerly Holiday Reno and Siena Reno) is a hotel and former casino in Reno, Nevada. It opened in 1956 as the Holiday, closed in 1998, and reopened as Siena in 2001. It uses the Renaissance Hotels brand under license from Marriott International.

== History ==
=== Holiday (1956–1998) ===
Holiday opened in 1956 as a non-gaming hotel. Within a year of its opening, poor performance resulted in the addition of gaming. At the end of October 1998, after 42 years in business, Holiday closed. Shortly after the old Holiday closed, it was purchased by California investor Barney Ng, who planned to remodel the old building by completely gutting the structure and then rebuilding and expanding on it, at a cost of US$16-$20 million, transforming the structure and adding an all suite floor, an additional wing to the tower, a larger casino, dining venues, a large spa, and an entrance with a clock tower.

=== Siena (2001–2017) ===
The hotel opened on July 31, 2001 with 500 employees.

After years of financial struggle, Siena was closed on October 21, 2010.

It was decided by creditors to auction the hotel off and that was done on November 10, 2010. A group of investors from various locations around the country including Reno with hospitality experience called "Grand Siena, LLC" purchased the property for $3.9 million.

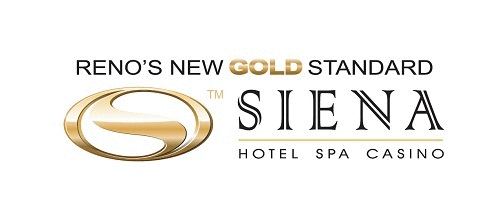
Siena Reno logo (2011–2015)

Grand Siena, LLC invested $5 million into refurbishing Siena Reno, including remodeled rooms, a redesigned casino, new restaurants and entertainment venues and a revamped spa. They claimed the hotel was positioned to rank as a 4 or 5 diamond resort. The newly revamped Siena opened on April 18, 2011.

The new owners of the boutique resort say they have replaced much of the old Italian theme with an aggressive-contemporary theme using much marble, LED lighting, and imported artwork. They say the new facility will cater to a more mature audience with less emphasis on loud nightlife.

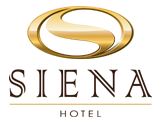
Siena Reno logo (2015–2017)

In May 2015, Grand Siena, LLC agreed to sell the Siena. The casino closed on June 30, 2015, the day before the sale was completed. Months later, the ownership group, led by developer Fernando Leal, announced that the Siena would be rebranded as a Renaissance Hotel, and confirmed that the casino would not reopen.

=== Renaissance by Marriott (2017–present) ===
In 2017, renovations were completed and the rebranding as a Renaissance Hotel took effect.
