= Cait Corrain review bombing controversy =

2023 literature controversy

In late 2023, aspiring fantasy author Cait Corrain created multiple fake accounts on Goodreads to review bomb other authors. Del Rey Books and agent Rebecca Podos canceled their contracts with Corrain.

== Events ==
On December 5, 2023, author Xiran Jay Zhao posted on Twitter, "If you as a debut author are going to make a bunch of fake Goodreads accounts one-star-bombing fellow debuts you're threatened by can you at least not make it so obvious". After Internet speculation on the author's identity, Zhao named the author as Cait Corrain and shared a Google Doc showing screenshots of low ratings from accounts allegedly owned by Corrain.

The fantasy novel Crown of Starlight was to be Cait Corrain's debut title, scheduled to be published on May 14, 2024 through Del Rey, a science fiction and fantasy imprint of Penguin Random House. As of December 12, Corrain was no longer represented by agent Rebecca Podos. Del Rey and UK publisher Daphne Press also cancelled their contracts with Corrain.

While Corrain initially described the negative reviews as left by a friend and provided screenshots of a Discord conversation between themself and the friend, it was later said that the friend had been "non-existent", confirming that Corrain had faked the conversation. Internet users also commented that the list of targeted authors included people of color.

Corrain later issued an apology, saying that they had recently "suffered a complete psychological breakdown" after "fighting a losing battle against depression, alcoholism and substance abuse". They deactivated social media and entered an "intensive psychiatric care" facility on December 12, 2023.

The controversy was cited by industry professionals as an example of abuse issues on Goodreads.

A February 2024 interview with The Daily Beast gave Corrain's side of the controversy. Corrain blamed the controversy on drug abuse, alcoholism, and ADHD medication, denying that racism played a factor, and confirming their intention to stay out of the spotlight.

As of 2026, Crown of Starlight has not been published.

== See also ==
- Literary fraud
