= Xiran Jay Zhao =

Chinese-born Canadian author

- Born: China
- Education: Simon Fraser University (BS)
- Occupations: Author and social media creator
- Years active: 2020–present
- Notable work: Iron Widow, Zachary Ying and the Dragon Emperor

Chinese name
- Simplified Chinese: 赵希然
- Traditional Chinese: 趙希然
Transcriptions
Standard Mandarin
- Hanyu Pinyin: Zhào Xīrán
other Mandarin
- Xiao'erjing: جَوْ ثِ‌ژًا
- Website: xiranjayzhao.com

Xiran Jay Zhao (Chinese: 赵希然; pinyin: Zhào Xīrán) is a Canadian author and social media creator. Their (Note: Zhao uses they/them pronouns.) debut novel, Iron Widow, became a No. 1 New York Times Best Seller and won the 2021 BSFA Award for Best Book for Younger Readers.

Zhao's subsequent novels, Zachary Ying and the Dragon Emperor (2022) and Iron Widow's sequel Heavenly Tyrant (2024), were also New York Times Best Sellers. They won the 2024 Astounding Award for Best New Writer and Heavenly Tyrant won the 2025 Aurora Award for Best YA Novel.

== Early life and education ==
Xiran Jay Zhao immigrated to British Columbia from a small town in China in grade five. Their father is of Hui heritage. Zhao would imagine stories growing up, but did not put any on paper until being encouraged to at an anime convention when they were 15.

They studied biochemistry at the Faculty of Health Sciences at Simon Fraser University, graduating with a Bachelor of Science degree in 2020. They worked at a co-op before deciding on a different career.

== Career ==
In March 2020, Zhao signed a two-book deal with Penguin Teen Canada for a young adult (YA) mecha reimagining of the rise of the Chinese Empress Wu. Rock the Boat, the children's imprint of Oneworld Publications, acquired the UK rights in May 2021. Zhao described the series as a "monstrous amalgamation of my love for anime and my love for Chinese harem dramas". The first installment in the series, Iron Widow, was published in September 2021 and reached No. 1 in the Young Adult Hardcover category of the New York Times Best Seller list.

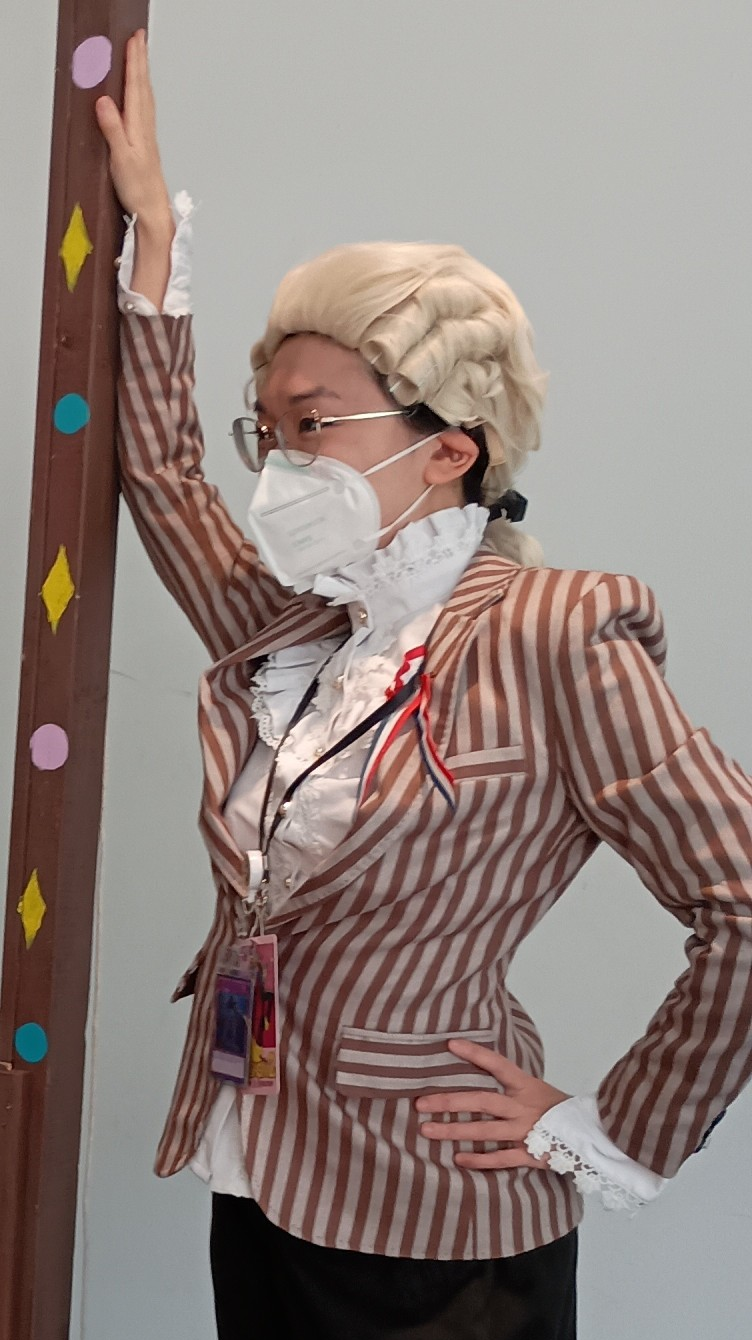
Zhao cosplaying as Maximilien Robespierre at the 2026 DashCon 2 which was themed around the French Revolution.

In September 2020, Zhao went viral, first on a Twitter thread followed by their first YouTube video, for their criticisms of Disney's live-action Mulan remake and its cultural inaccuracies. They credit their presence on the Internet as a self-described "Chinese history memer" for the success of Iron Widow, which was initially expected to only appeal to a niche audience. Jessica Singer, for CBC News in August 2021, highlighted the impact of BookTok on sales of young adult fiction. Singer wrote that "books like Iron Widow by Canadian author Xiran Jay Zhao are already gaining popularity online, even before the book's release date in late September". Kara Savoy, Penguin Random House Canada's integrated marketing director, told Singer that "when Xiran did an unboxing video of their advanced copies a few weeks ago [on TikTok], the pre-sale numbers in the U.S. went up 600 per cent that week". Their YouTube channel showcases Chinese history, pop culture and cosplay, and they have been a featured cosplayer at multiple editions of DashCon 2. Zhao spoke publicly about the impact of the payment structure for book publishing on their career, noting that it led them to "prioritise projects that brought in reliable money", such as YouTube videos.

At the beginning of 2021, Zhao landed their second book deal for Zachary Ying and the Dragon Emperor, a middle grade contemporary fantasy with Margaret K. McElderry Books, an imprint of Simon & Schuster. It was released on 10 May 2022. The novel debuted at No. 4 on the New York Times Best Seller list in the Children's Middle Grade Hardcover category; it remained on the list for two weeks. Alec Scott, for The Globe and Mail, compared Zachary Ying to Zhao's Iron Widow and commented that "the two books speak to Zhao's obsessions – both with anime, the visual storytelling popularized in Japan that's gone global, and with Chinese history and mythology. [...] In both novels, the mythic past gets translated into the future. [...] For all their differences of mood, the novels rescue what is valuable to Zhao in Chinese history and myth, and project it forward – creating artistic acts of cultural reappropriation". For their part, Zhao recalls the way historical idiom and allegory are woven into contemporary Chinese language and culture -- alongside history education in schools -- as the reason they are able to draw on so much historical and mythological content for their books.

Zhao was a finalist for the Astounding Award for Best New Writer in 2022. In 2023, Zhao again received enough votes to be a finalist, but was declared ineligible and removed from the ballot. It later emerged that this was due to self-censorship by the Hugo Award administrators of the 81st World Science Fiction Convention – which was held in Chengdu, China – in order to appease the Chinese government, which has a strict censorship regime. Zhao made a guest appearance for an episode of the ABC/CBC documentary series Stuff the British Stole revolving around items looted during the Boxer Rebellion that aired in November 2022.

In December 2023, Zhao exposed Cait Corrain's "pattern of leaving one-star reviews through fake Goodreads accounts, mostly on the debut works of first-time writers of color, while leaving positive reviews on her own forthcoming book". This resulted in Corrain being dropped by her publishers.

In 2024, Zhao won the Astounding Award for Best New Writer after the award sponsor Dell Magazines extended the eligibility requirements. The release of the second installment of the Iron Widow series, Heavenly Tyrant, was delayed. It was then published on 24 December 2024. On 12 January 2025, Heavenly Tyrant debuted at No. 1 on the New York Times Best Seller list in the Young Adult Hardcover category; it remained on the list for five weeks.

== Bibliography ==
=== Young adult ===
==== Iron Widow series ====
1. Iron Widow. Penguin Teen Canada. 2021. ISBN 9780735269934.
2. Heavenly Tyrant. Bloomsbury. 2024. ISBN 9780861544233.

=== Middle grade ===
- Zachary Ying and the Dragon Emperor. Simon & Schuster. 2022. ISBN 9781665900706.

== Awards and nominations ==
Year	Award	Category	Work	Result	Ref.
2021	Goodreads Choice Awards	Young Adult Fantasy & Science Fiction	Iron Widow	Nominated	
2021	Kitschies	Golden Tentacle (Debut Novel)	Iron Widow	Shortlisted	
2021	Nebula Award	Andre Norton Award	Iron Widow	Shortlisted	
2022	Astounding Award for Best New Writer		—N/a	Finalist	
2022	Barnes & Noble Children's & YA Book Awards	Young Adult	Iron Widow	Won	
2022	British Fantasy Award	Newcomer (Sydney J. Bounds Award)	Iron Widow	Shortlisted	
2022	BSFA Award	Fiction for Younger Readers	Iron Widow	Won	
2022	CCBC Book Awards	Arlene Barlin Award for Science Fiction and Fantasy	Iron Widow	Won	
2022	CCBC Book Awards	Amy Mathers Teen Book Award	Iron Widow	Won	
2022	Locus Award	First Novel	Iron Widow	Nominated	
2022	Locus Award	Young Adult Novel	Iron Widow	Nominated	
2022	Lodestar Award for Best Young Adult Book		Iron Widow	Finalist	
2022	Pacific Northwest Book Award	—N/a	Iron Widow	Won	
2024	Astounding Award for Best New Writer		—N/a	Won	
2025	Lodestar Award for Best Young Adult Book		Heavenly Tyrant	Finalist	
2025	Aurora Awards	Best YA Novel	Heavenly Tyrant	Won	
