= DashCon =

2014 fan convention

- Logotype used on the official website

- A photo of the DashCon ball pit. This photo in particular was used in criticism of the convention by Tumblr users.
- Status: Defunct (revived as DashCon 2)
- Genre: Fan convention
- Date: July 11–13, 2014
- Venue: Renaissance Schaumburg Convention Center Hotel
- Locations: Schaumburg, Illinois
- Coordinates: 42°3′39.3″N 88°2′26.4″W
- Country: United States
- Years active: 2014
- Founder: Lochlan O'Neil, Cain Hopkins, Megan Eli, and Roxanne Schwieterman
- Attendance: ~350
- Budget: $15,000
- Website: dashcon.org

DashCon (originally titled Tumbl-Con USA) was a fan convention catering primarily to users of the blogging platform Tumblr, with a particular emphasis on fandoms. Held over the weekend of July 11, 2014, at the Renaissance Schaumburg Convention Center Hotel in Schaumburg, Illinois, the inaugural convention quickly became infamous for allegations of mismanagement and corruption among organizers, an alleged abrupt demand by the hotel for an upfront payment of cash for use of its facilities, and celebrity guests being forced to drop out of the convention after they were informed by the hotel that they would be responsible for paying for their rooms. A small ball pit placed in one of the halls became a meme after organizers offered attendees an "extra hour" in the pit (along with raffle and concert tickets) as reimbursement for a canceled panel.

Organizers for DashCon initially stated they would hold a second DashCon in 2015 despite the issues faced by the inaugural edition, but officially announced via Tumblr post in September 2014 that DashCon LLP would be dissolved and have all its assets liquidated, meaning they would not hold a second convention. The post also denied claims that a similarly themed convention, Emoti-Con, was a re-branded DashCon.

In 2025, a similarly themed convention named DashCon 2, organized by a team unrelated to the 2014 convention, was held in Toronto. This event was considered a success.

== Concept ==
DashCon was originally announced in mid-2013 by 15-year-old Tumblr user Lochlan "Nessie" O'Neil under the name Tumbl-Con USA, as a convention catered to users of the blogging platform Tumblr, and was touted as the "largest gathering of Tumblr users to date". The convention was to focus on works that had developed significant followings among Tumblr users at the time of its conception, such as Homestuck, Doctor Who, Sherlock, Supernatural, and the podcast Welcome to Night Vale. The convention raised money through ticket pre-orders, along with a crowdfunding campaign on Indiegogo. Prior to the start of the convention, the name of the event was changed to DashCon (alluding to the site's dashboard feed) to indicate that it was not officially associated with Tumblr.

== Convention ==
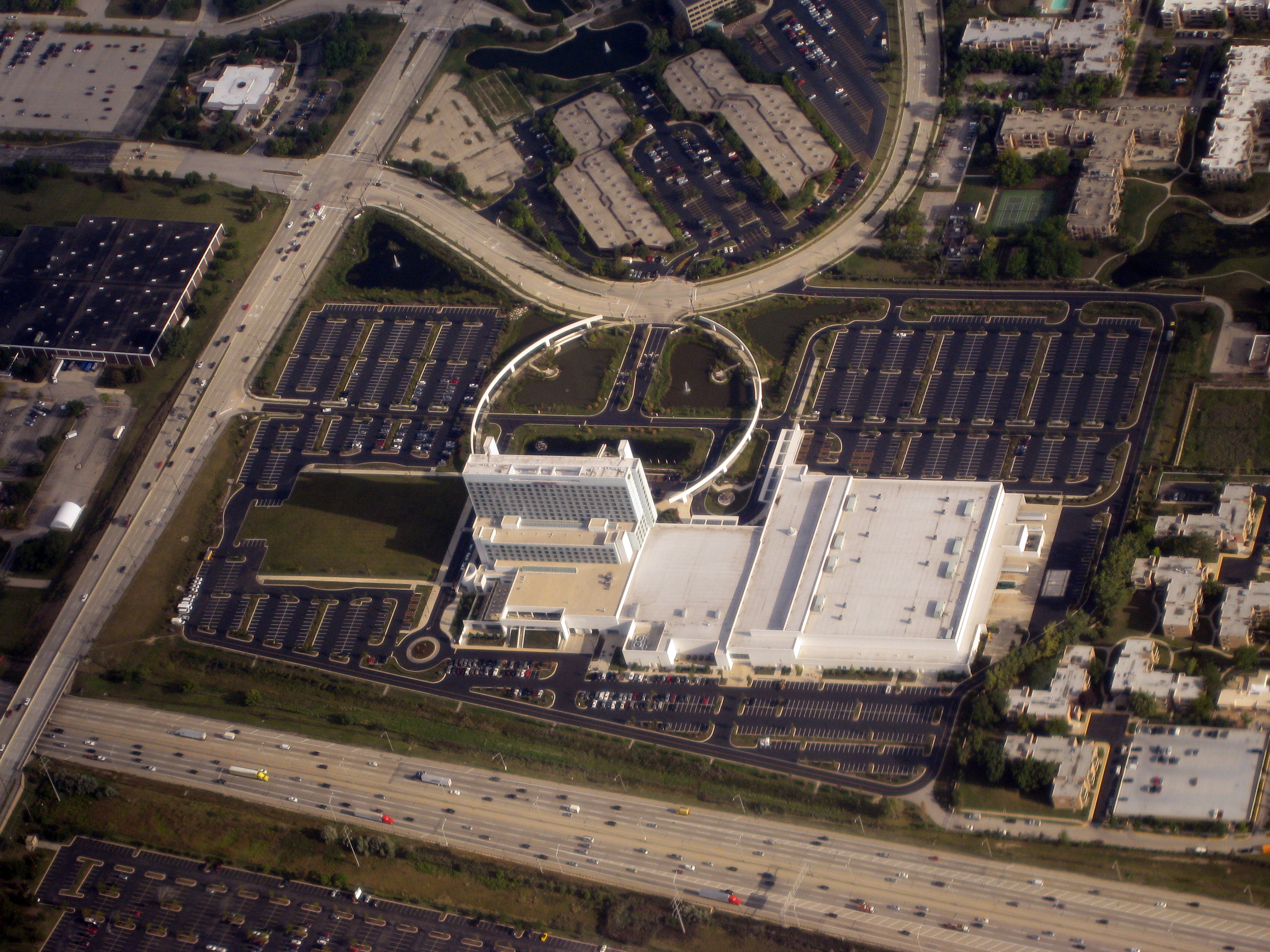
Overhead view of the Renaissance Schaumburg Convention Center Hotel, where the convention was held

The convention was organized by DashCon LLP, a Hudson, Ohio-based limited liability partnership owned by Megan Eli and Roxanne Schwieterman – O'Neil was not formally associated, being a minor at the time. DashCon was held from July 11 to 13, 2014, at the Renaissance Schaumburg Convention Center Hotel. Among the guests originally scheduled to attend were actor Doug Jones, webcomic artist ND Stevenson, and the cast of Welcome to Night Vale.

On the evening of July 11 – the first night of DashCon – early reports began to surface from attendees that events occurring at the convention were poorly planned and attended, a vendor had left due to poor sales, and minors had been admitted into 18+ rated panels. The convention itself also began to experience unexpected financial difficulties: a DashCon staff member claimed that the staff of the Renaissance purportedly informed them that they would need to pay $20,000 upfront for the use of the facilities or shut the convention down. DashCon organizers claimed to have verbally negotiated to pay the venue gradually throughout the convention using ticket sales, rather than issuing an upfront payment despite their contract suggesting otherwise.

At 9 p.m., as a result of this unexpected development, O'Neil and other DashCon organizers began to publicly solicit donations among a crowd of around 350 attendees (itself much lower than the original estimate of 3,000 to 7,000 attendees), and online via PayPal, to cover costs, with a goal of collecting at least $17,000 by 10 p.m. to prevent the convention from being shut down. Organizers speculated that the abrupt change in plans was because the hotel's management "[did not] like the people at the con." Attendees were seen performing a three-fingered salute from The Hunger Games, chanting lines from High School Musical, and singing Queen's "We Are the Champions" and "Do You Hear the People Sing?" from Les Misérables. O'Neil, being tasked to collect the funds, reported being in tears and locked out of her room for most of the ordeal, only to return to her phone to find a flood of death threats on every platform. While organizers managed to raise the necessary funds, the incident raised suspicion among attendees over the possibility of the crowdfunding drive being a scam (which included disputes over the authenticity of an image of the bill, printed on hotel stationery, which was released by a staff member), or being further proof of the alleged mismanagement and corruption.

Several guests – including ND Stevenson (who had to moderate his own panel because the scheduled moderator was absent), the Baker Street Babes (who produced an all-female Sherlock Holmes podcast), and the Welcome to Night Vale cast – were also informed by the hotel that they would be responsible for paying for their own rooms, despite previously being told that the rooms would be paid for by the convention itself. Stevenson ultimately joined the WTNV cast for the night in accommodations obtained via Airbnb. The appearance by the Welcome to Night Vale cast was ultimately canceled; organizers did not issue refunds but instead reimbursed those who had purchased tickets for the panel with tickets to a raffle of various autographed collectibles, admission to a concert with the Chicago-based Doctor Who-inspired rock band Time Crash, and an "extra hour with the ball pit". O'Neil, who would later be diagnosed with narcolepsy, reported being consistently overworked throughout the event, being in charge of "con ops" and not being allowed breaks.

== Reception and aftermath ==
The ball pit – roughly the size of a kiddie pool, in an otherwise empty concession hall – and the notion of an "extra hour" in it, quickly became a meme among attendees and other Tumblr users, inspiring parodies. Users envisioned other large quantities of items that could have been purchased with the $17,000, and a video game developer created Dashcon Simulator 2014, a comedic simulation of the convention's ball pit. Convention guest Mark Oshiro explained that the ball pit was "not a point of interest, it wasn't something a single soul talked about, and it was just a quirky thing that existed", and that "in order to support the idea that DashCon was a full, 100 percent disaster, every single detail was used to paint the con and the people at it as horrific failures of humanity". O'Neil reported receiving death threats for years following the event and needing extensive therapy, describing DashCon as the worst day of her life.

In the aftermath of the convention, a staff member of the hotel stated that the facility did enjoy their presence, while DashCon's staff promised to provide a more thorough explanation of what had occurred. O'Neil asserts that the money raised was never a scam and went entirely to pay the venue. The Baker Street Babes reported that the hotel payment issue was, according to organizers, a mistake. Stevenson, whose hotel payment had not yet been resolved, defended criticism of DashCon by other users, arguing that they were unfamiliar with what typically occurs at a convention in the first place.

== Follow-ups ==
=== Emoti-Con ===
Cain Hopkins, one of the co-creators of DashCon, announced Emoti-Con, a convention for "various Internet communities", in 2015. The announcement faced criticism as people noted significant similarities between Emoti-Con and DashCon, such as using the same venue, reusing much of the website's original text, and enforcing a no-refunds policy. Critics also felt that the mix between users of 4chan, Reddit, and Tumblr in Emoti-Con could become hostile due to their differences. In response, Megan Eli claimed that attendees of DashCon came from multiple different websites but still behaved well. Eli also insisted that Emoti-Con is not a renaming of DashCon, and will be "functioning under a very different infrastructure than DashCon did, with a more experienced and well-rounded staff". However, Emoti-Con was cancelled a few months later, citing "personal, financial, and safety" issues.

=== DashCon 2 ===
In 2025, 11 years after DashCon, a convention named DashCon 2 was held in Toronto. It was generally seen as a success and has recurred annually ever since, with O'Neil being a recurring guest of honor.

== See also ==
- Fyre Festival
- TanaCon
- Willy's Chocolate Experience
- Detroit Bridgerton Themed Ball
- Barbie Dream Fest
