= Renaissance Schaumburg Convention Center Hotel =

Hotel in Schaumburg, Illinois, United States

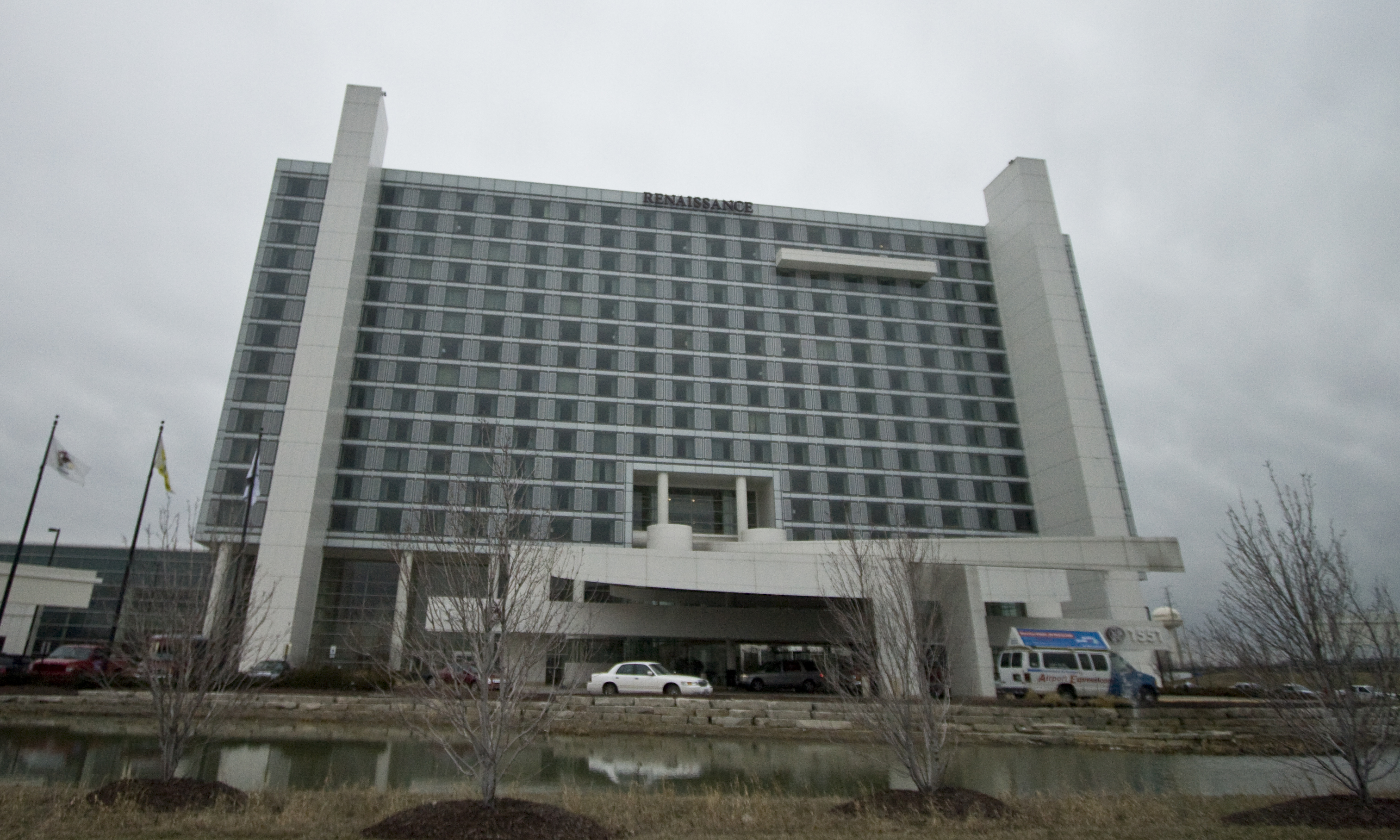
- Renaissance Schaumburg Convention Center Hotel
- Interactive map of the Renaissance Schaumburg Convention Center Hotel area

General information
- Location: Schaumburg, Illinois, 1551 North Thoreau Drive
- Coordinates: 42°3′39.3″N 88°2′26.4″W
- Opening: 2006; 20 years ago
- Owner: Village of Schaumburg
- Operator: Renaissance Hotels

Technical details
- Lifts/elevators: 14 elevators installed by Otis Elevator Company, 4 escalators installed by KONE Corporation

Design and construction
- Architect: John Portman

Other information
- Number of rooms: 474
- Public transit: Pace

Website
- Official website

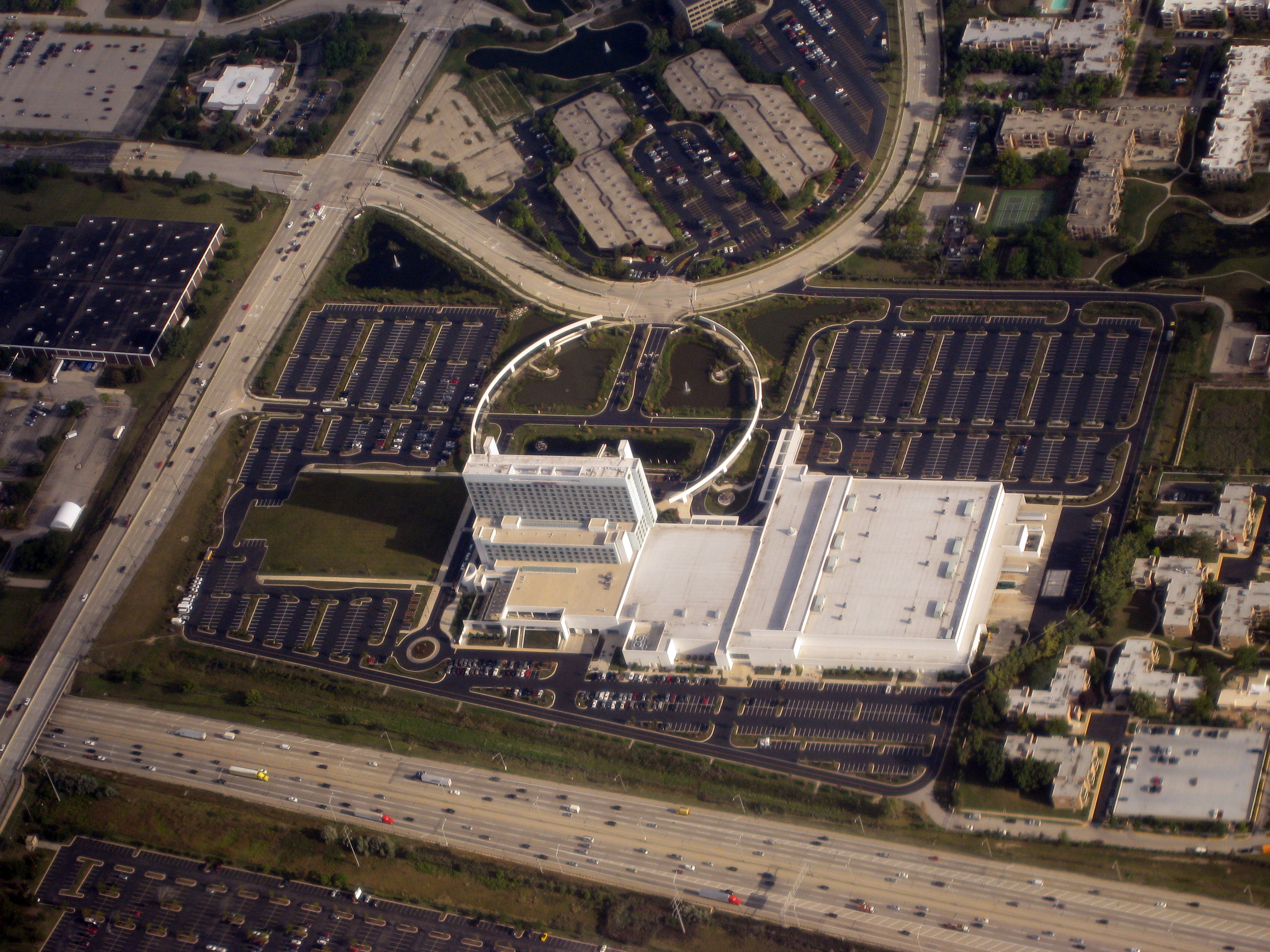
Renaissance Schaumburg Hotel property

The Renaissance Schaumburg Convention Center Hotel is a hotel located at I-90 and Meacham Road in Schaumburg, Illinois. The 500-room hotel opened its doors in July 2006 and is run by Marriott under their Renaissance brand. The property features a 100,000 sq ft (9,300 m^{2}) exhibition hall, 48,000 sq ft (4,500 m^{2}) of meeting room space, and a 28,000 sq ft (2,600 m^{2}) ballroom, all of which can be divided to provide many configurations.

Construction began on the $156 million facility in July 2004 and took two years to complete. The property is owned by the Village of Schaumburg, who chose John Portman & Associates of Atlanta as the architect and Walsh Construction of Chicago as the general contractor. The original design also called for an $80 million performing arts center but that portion of the design has been tabled for now. The convention center hosted its first event, the USA Gymnastics Tumbling & Trampoline National Championships, from July 5–14, 2006. The hotel's first guests checked in on July 17, 2006.

All of the interiors for the hotel and convention center were designed by the Atlanta Office of Hirsch Bedner Associates, the world's largest and leading hospitality interior design firm.

In July 2014, it was the site of the Tumblr-themed fandom convention DashCon, which ended up with a number of issues between the organizers, attendees, and the hotel's staff, including the alleged non-payment of a venue use fee to the hotel.

== See also ==
- List of convention centers in the United States
