= Renaissance Seattle Hotel =

Hotel in Seattle, Washington, U.S.

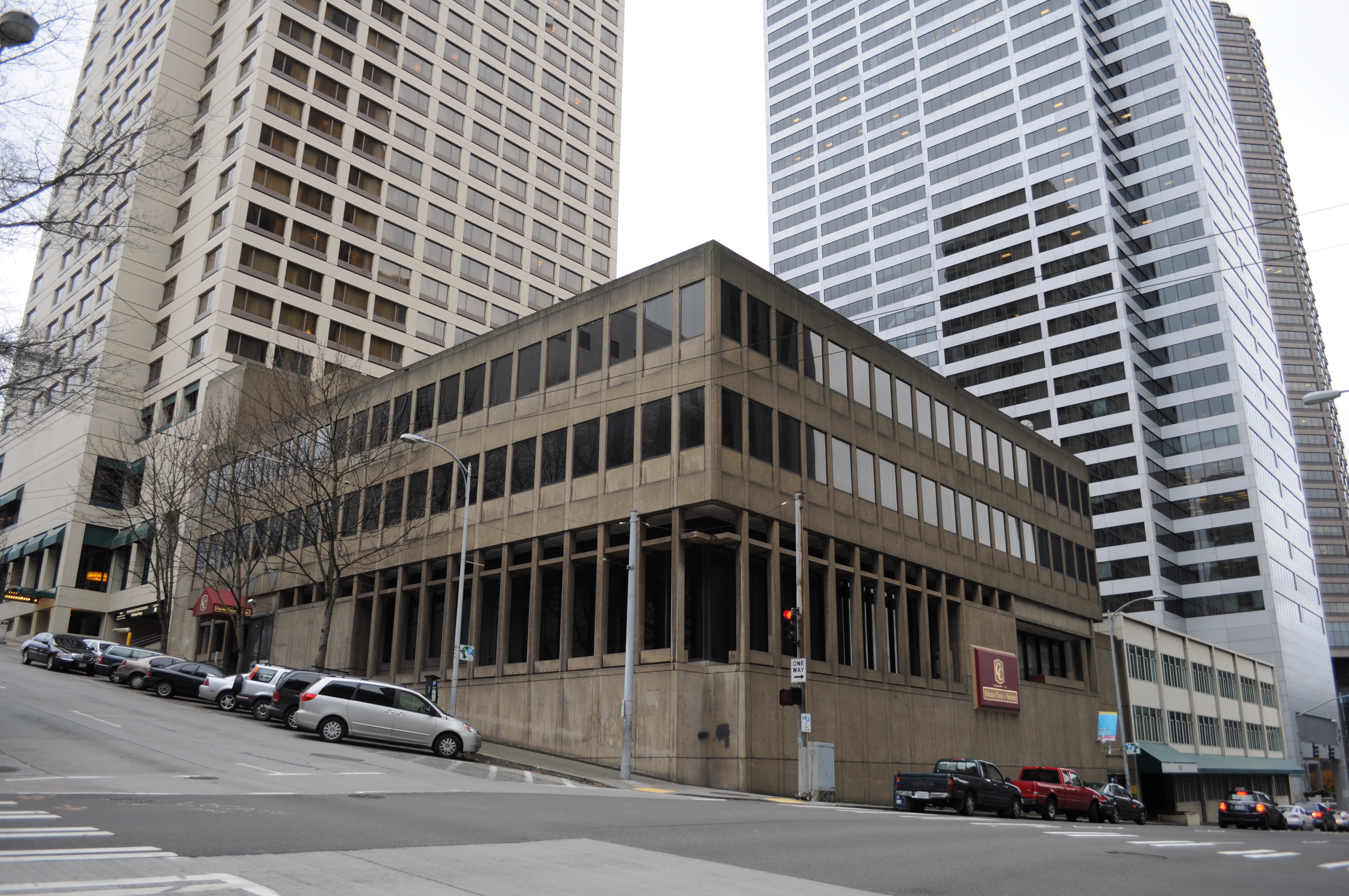
- The Renaissance Seattle Hotel (rear left)
- Interactive map of the Renaissance Seattle Hotel area

General information
- Location: Seattle, Washington, United States
- Coordinates: 47°36′24″N 122°19′51″W

Renaissance Seattle Hotel is a hotel in Seattle, in the U.S. state of Washington. It has more than 500 rooms.

The 28-story hotel was built in 1983. It received a $28 million remodel in 2010, and another renovation in 2016.
