= Iron Widow =

2021 novel by Xiran Jay Zhao

- Author: Xiran Jay Zhao
- Cover artist: Ashley Mackenzie
- Language: English
- Genre: Science fiction
- Publisher: Penguin Teen
- Publication date: September 21, 2021
- Publication place: Canada
- Pages: 400
- ISBN: 978-0735269934

Iron Widow is a 2021 young adult science fantasy novel by Canadian writer Xiran Jay Zhao. The novel is a mecha reimagining of the rise of China’s first and only female Emperor Wu Zetian set in the nation of Huaxia, a futuristic reinterpretation of Medieval China.

Iron Widow is a New York Times Best Seller; where the book remained on the list for 39 weeks. It won the 2021 BSFA Award for "Best Book for Younger Readers" and has been nominated for two 2022 Locus Awards and the 2022 Lodestar Award for Best Young Adult Book.

== Background ==
In March 2020, Xiran Jay Zhao signed a two-book deal with Penguin Teen Canada for a reimagining of the rise of Wu Zetian, the only female emperor of China who ruled during the late 600s. Rock the Boat, the children's imprint of Oneworld Publications, acquired the UK rights in May 2021. Iron Widow, Zhao's debut novel, was released on September 21, 2021.

In an interview with Publishers Weekly, Zhao stated that "there's no other woman in Chinese history who had a rise through the harem as iconic as hers... It's been incredibly fun to reimagine her as instead a teenage peasant girl in an intensely misogynistic world who suddenly gains access to giant fighter mechas—how would she change her world?" Numerous anime shows, such as Neon Genesis Evangelion, Digimon, and Attack on Titan served as inspiration for Iron Widow. In particular, Zhao in a Twitter thread said the story was written partly in response to their disappointment in the direction DARLING in the FRANXX took in its later episodes.

== Synopsis ==
=== Setting ===
The nation of Huaxia, a futuristic reimagining of Medieval China, is constantly under attack by alien creatures (Hunduns). Aided by mysterious and unseen gods (the Heavenly Council), humanity has recovered from a devastating attack ages ago that forced civilization to rebuild. Humans have learned to harvest the bodies of defeated Hunduns to create giant fighting mechas, called Chrysalises.

Chrysalises are piloted by young men with high levels of spirit pressure who can release their qi, following the five classical Asian elements. Treated like celebrities by the media and adoring public, male pilots rely on "concubines", female pilots who supply them with additional qi at the cost of their own lives. Male-female pairings that don't risk the concubine's death are called Balanced Matches, but are rare and treated as celebrity marriages. The strongest male pilot in history was the legendary emperor Qin Zheng, rumored to be frozen in stasis within his Chrysalis, the Yellow Dragon, to stave off an illness until a cure could be found. The Hunduns have controlled the place where the Yellow Dragon is for centuries.

=== Plot ===
Wu Zetian enlists as a concubine to avenge her older sister, who died after having enlisted but meeting her unexplained death before she ever got to co-pilot a Chrysalis. She resents her uncaring family, who only value their daughters for the money their deaths as concubines will fetch them. Despite being in love with a wealthy childhood friend, Gao Yizhi, she resolves to avenge her sister even if it will likely mean her death. Zetian successfully arranges to be paired with her sister's co-pilot, Yang Guang. While piloting, Zetian sees his memories of the many girls he's abused. Zetian overwhelms and kills him. Her survival has her branded a dangerous and rare "Iron Widow". Her spirit pressure now registers at extraordinarily high levels. Feared, but conscripted, she resolves to destroy the Chrysalis system and its reliance on the sacrifice of female pilots.

To keep her under control, the army pairs her with their strongest male pilot: the conscripted criminal Li Shimin. She and Shimin are a Balanced Match, and their mental bond causes them to learn more about each other. Zetian discovers that Shimin is actually a gentle artist who murdered his family for gang raping a young woman and that the army forced his alcohol addiction to control him. Though their relationship starts as a show for the public, the two fall in love. When they are relocated to the capitol, Yizhi pulls strings to be able to assist their training, in an effort to keep Zetian alive. Yizhi helps Shimin break his addiction, and Zetian and Yizhi secretly rekindle their love. Yizhi, Shimin, and Zetian secretly enter a polyamorous relationship.

After a heavily televised battle where Yizhi gives his qi to help them defeat a massive Hundun, Yizhi joins them in the Chrysalis. The three suspect that the Chrysalis system is biased toward the survival of the male pilots. Shimin and Zetian torture a high-ranking official, who confesses that girls are just as likely to have strong spirit pressure as boys, but the system is rigged to ensure the survival of the male pilot.

During a counterattack in the lost territory, another Chrysalis attempts to kill them under secret orders from the government. Shimin ejects Zetian and Yizhi from the cockpit and pilots the Chrysalis alone, the strain of which kills him. Zetian desperately seeks out the rumored location of the Emperor Qin Zheng with the aid of nomads in the lost territory. She awakens Zheng from stasis and offers to cure his illness in exchange for piloting his Yellow Dragon, after which she easily defeats the Hunduns and the treacherous Chrysalis pilots. She then turns on the army and capitol, razing its central command tower, and exposing the truth of the co-pilot system to the media. Zetian establishes herself as the new ruler of Huaxia, "Empress Wu", and together with Yizhi, forces the surviving military and political powers to submit.

Zetian attempts to retrieve Shimin's body, but the Heavenly Council has taken it. A secret government document reveals that Huaxia is not on Earth, but actually a colony on another planet. The Hunduns are the native species, defending themselves from invading humans. Before Zetian can share this horrifying information with the public, the Heavenly Council advise her that if she serves them, they will revive Shimin.

== Characters ==
- Wu Zetian: a peasant girl who becomes the titular "Iron Widow" and co-pilot for the Vermilion Bird Chrysalis. She seeks to topple the sexist society of Huaxia after her sister is sacrificed as a pilot.
- Li Shimin: the "Iron Demon", Wu Zetian's half-Rongdi co-pilot for the Vermilion Bird, a former death row inmate who was spared for having the strongest qi in the history of modern Huaxia. He is an alcoholic and has a tendency to lash out to express his anger, however he has a gentler and sensitive side underneath.
- Gao Yizhi: Zetian and Shimin's love interest, the gentle and elegant fifth son of the biggest media mogul in Huaxia who forms polyamorous relationships with Zetian and Shimin and works to keep them alive against political forces that would have them disposed of. He is a composite character inspired by several lovers of the historic Empress Wu.
- Gao Qiu: Gao Yizhi's father, the richest media mogul in Huaxia, and a corrupt businessman with underground ties to spread his influence. Initially dismissive, he eventually agrees to exclusive and lucrative media contracts to support Zetian and Shimin's public image.
- Sima Yi: A senior strategist and Zetian and Shimin's reluctant handler and trainer.
- An Lushan: Chief strategist for the Sui-Tang frontier. He treacherously seeks to remove Zetian and Shimin from battle by sending them on suicide missions and is later interrogated by the two for his knowledge of the Chrysalis pilot system.
- Dugu Qieluo & Yang Jian: The female and male pilots, respectively, of the White Tiger Chrysalis. Qieluo is at first cold and hostile toward Zetian's attempt at friendship.
- Ma Xiuying & Zhu Yuanzhang: The female and male pilots, respectively, of the Black Tortoise Chrysalis. Xiuying is initially friendly toward Zetian, offering advice, while Yuanzhang is openly hostile toward Shimin and Qieluo for their Rongdi heritage.
- Emperor Qin Zheng: A legendary ruler of Huaxia and pilot of the Emperor-class Chrysalis the Yellow Dragon. Qin Zheng's spirit pressure is unmatched beyond any pilot in existence. He contracted a disease called flower pox and used the natural qi of the Kunlun Mountains to suspend himself in stasis until a cure could be found. Rumors say he remains there still, but the territory surrounding him has been lost to the Hunduns for over 200 years.
- Yang Guang: the male pilot of the Nine-Tailed Fox Chrysalis, and the target of Wu Zetian's revenge for murdering her sister.
- The Heavenly Council: The mysterious and unseen gods who aid Huaxia. They have never been seen in person or recorded, but they provided humanity with the lost technology to rebuild society after the Hunduns destroyed civilization. Defeated Hundun husks are harvested and given as offerings to the Heavenly Council or reshaped into Chrysalises. The ruling Sages take their orders from the Heavenly Council.

== Reception ==
Jessica Singer, for CBC News in August 2021, highlighted the impact of BookTok on sales of young adult fiction. Singer wrote that "books like Iron Widow by Canadian author Xiran Jay Zhao are already gaining popularity online, even before the book's release date in late September". Kara Savoy, Penguin Random House Canada's integrated marketing director, told Singer that "it's one of the books that we've really been sending out to Canadian influencers. When Xiran did an unboxing video of their advanced copies a few weeks ago [on TikTok], the pre-sale numbers in the U.S. went up 600 per cent that week". Iron Widow reached #1 in the Young Adult Hardcover category of New York Times Best Sellers in the first week after its release. The week of January 2, 2022, the book had slipped to #5 and had been on the New York Times Best Sellers for eleven weeks. As of May 2022, the book has remained on the New York Times Best Sellers for 28 weeks.

The book received generally positive reviews, with commentators noting the queer and feminist themes. Linda Codega of Tor.com stated that the "worldbuilding is imaginative and explosive, the strange mix of mecha battles and reimagined characters lighting up the fight scenes and adding a new mythology to historical fantasy" but that the book didn't go "far enough to examine the underlying misogyny and transphobia" the characters faced from the oppressive society. Mimi Koehler of The Nerd Daily, however, found the book "takes a deep dive into the unrelenting and unfair gender roles Wu Zetian's society tries to uphold at any cost and how that not only affects how people treat her but how she, in par, treats others," comparing it to Pacific Rim and The Handmaid's Tale.

The book was listed on multiple end-of-year roundups. The Boston Globe included Iron Widow on their "Best Books of 2021" list and stated that the book is an "intense, feminist page-turner". CBC Books included it on their "The best Canadian middle-grade and YA books of 2021" list. Business Insider highlighted that the Iron Widow is on "The 20 most popular young adult reads of 2021" list based on Goodreads reviewers.

== Awards and nominations ==
Year	Award	Category	Result	Ref.
2021	BSFA Award	Best Book for Younger Readers	Won	
2021	Andre Norton Nebula Award for Middle Grade and Young Adult Fiction		Nominated	
2021	The Kitschies	Golden Tentacle (Best Debut Novel)	Nominated	
2022	Pacific Northwest Booksellers Association Award		Won	
2022	Lodestar Award for Best Young Adult Book		Finalist	
2022	Barnes & Noble Children’s & YA Book Awards	Young Adult Category	Won	
2022	Locus Award	Best First Novel	Nominated	
2022	Locus Award	Best Young Adult Novel	Nominated	
2022	CCBC Book Awards	Arlene Barlin Award for Science Fiction and Fantasy	Won	
2022	CCBC Book Awards	Amy Mathers Teen Book Award	Won	

== Sequel ==
Zhao initially announced that the sequel, titled Heavenly Tyrant, would be released in Spring 2023. However, they later announced that the release would be delayed to April 30, 2024, and it changed once more to December 24, 2024. They earlier hinted on their Tumblr blog that the novel "will be a partial Three Kingdoms retelling".

== Film adaptation ==
In September 2022, Picturestart optioned the film rights to Iron Widow. It was announced that J.C. Lee was hired to write the screenplay and that the film will be produced by Erik Feig, Jessica Switch and Julia Hammer.
