= Springfield Metropolitan Exposition and Auditorium Authority =

The Springfield Metropolitan Exposition and Auditorium Authority (SMEAA) is the elected board that governs the Bank of Springfield Center in downtown Springfield, Illinois.

== History and Composition ==
SMEAA was created pursuant to state statute, in which the General Assembly granted the board the following rights and powers:

(a) To purchase, own, construct, lease as lessee or in any other way acquire, improve, extend, repair, reconstruct, regulate, operate, equip and maintain fair and exposition grounds, convention or exhibition centers and civic auditoriums, including sites and parking areas and facilities therefor located within the metropolitan area;

(b) To plan for such grounds, centers and auditoriums and to plan, sponsor, hold, arrange and finance fairs, industrial, cultural, educational, trade and scientific exhibits, shows and events and to use or allow the use of such grounds, centers and auditoriums for the holding of fairs, exhibits, shows and events whether conducted by the Authority or some other person or governmental agency;

(c) To exercise the right of eminent domain to acquire sites for such grounds, centers and auditoriums, and parking areas and facilities in the manner provided for the exercise of the right of eminent domain under the Eminent Domain Act;

(d) To fix and collect just, reasonable and nondiscriminatory charges for the use of such parking areas and facilities, grounds, centers and auditoriums and admission charges to fairs, shows, exhibits and events sponsored or held by the Authority. The charges collected may be made available to defray the reasonable expenses of the Authority and to pay the principal of and the interest on any bonds issued by the Authority;

(e) To enter into contracts treating in any manner with the objects and purposes of this Article.

Eleven SMEAA board members are elected from five districts, which encompass the Springfield metropolitan area. The SMEAA board has four officers: a Chairman, a Vice-Chairman, a Secretary, and a Treasurer.

== Recent developments ==
The SMEAA Board is officially nonpartisan, though the Republican and Democratic parties of Sangamon County typically endorse candidates running for this board whom they favor. Republican-backed candidates have usually enjoyed a strong majority on the SMEAA board. However, in the 2007 elections, three of the candidates endorsed by Republican Party of Sangamon County were disqualified from the ballot, due to errors made when filing their candidate petitions. One of those Republicans sought election as a write-in candidate, and garnered a narrow victory, retaining a SMEAA majority for Republican-supported candidates, but only by a margin of six out of eleven. (As of 2010 however, Republicans hold an 8 to 3 majority, on the board.) And, following the April 2011 elections, Democratic candidates will hold only 2 of the 11 elected positions.

Also in 2007, there was discussion about whether SMEAA, which had previously been involved in administering only the Bank of Springfield Center, should also become involved in the hotel business. A recent offer had been made by SMEAA Chairman Mike Coffey, Jr. and Springfield Mayor Timothy Davlin, to purchase the mortgage of the Abraham Lincoln Hotel and Conference Center, so as to prevent foreclosure proceedings against that establishment. Illinois State Treasurer Alexi Giannoulias rejected this proposal.
