= Wonka (surname) =

Wonka is a surname. Notable people with the surname include:

- Pavel Wonka, Czechoslovak dissident, victim of communist terror
- Salif Wonka, French rapper

== Fictional characters ==
- Willy Wonka, a fictional character in Roald Dahl's books Charlie and the Chocolate Factory and Charlie and the Great Glass Elevator

== See also ==
- Wonka (disambiguation)
