= Golden Ticket =

Golden Ticket may refer to:

== Literature & adapted works ==
- A plot element of the 1964 novel Charlie and the Chocolate Factory, or a plot element of:
  - The 1971 film adaptation, Willy Wonka & the Chocolate Factory
  - The 2005 film adaptation, Charlie and the Chocolate Factory (film)
  - The 2010 opera adaptation, The Golden Ticket (opera)
  - The 2026 reality television series, Wonka's The Golden Ticket
  - Two video game interpretations, Charlie and the Chocolate Factory (video games)
- The Golden Ticket: P, NP, and the Search for the Impossible, 2013 book by Lance Fortnow

== Music ==
- Golden Ticket (Danny Byrd album), 2013
- Golden Ticket (Golden Rules album), 2015
- "Golden Ticket", a song by Highasakite

== Television ==
- "Golden Ticket" (The Office), a 2009 episode of The Office
- "The Golden Ticket", a 2024 episode of Beast Games

== Other ==
- Golden ticket (pickleball), a pass to attend the USA Pickleball National Championships awarded by USA Pickleball
- Golden Ticket Awards, an annual set of awards given out by Amusement Today

== See also ==
- The Golden Passport, a 2017 book by Duff McDonald
