= Korec =

Korec may refer to:

- Korec (surname), a Slovak and Czech surname
- Korets, a city in Ukraine
- A trade name for quinapril
