= Daniel Ignác Trubač =

Czech sculptor and medalist

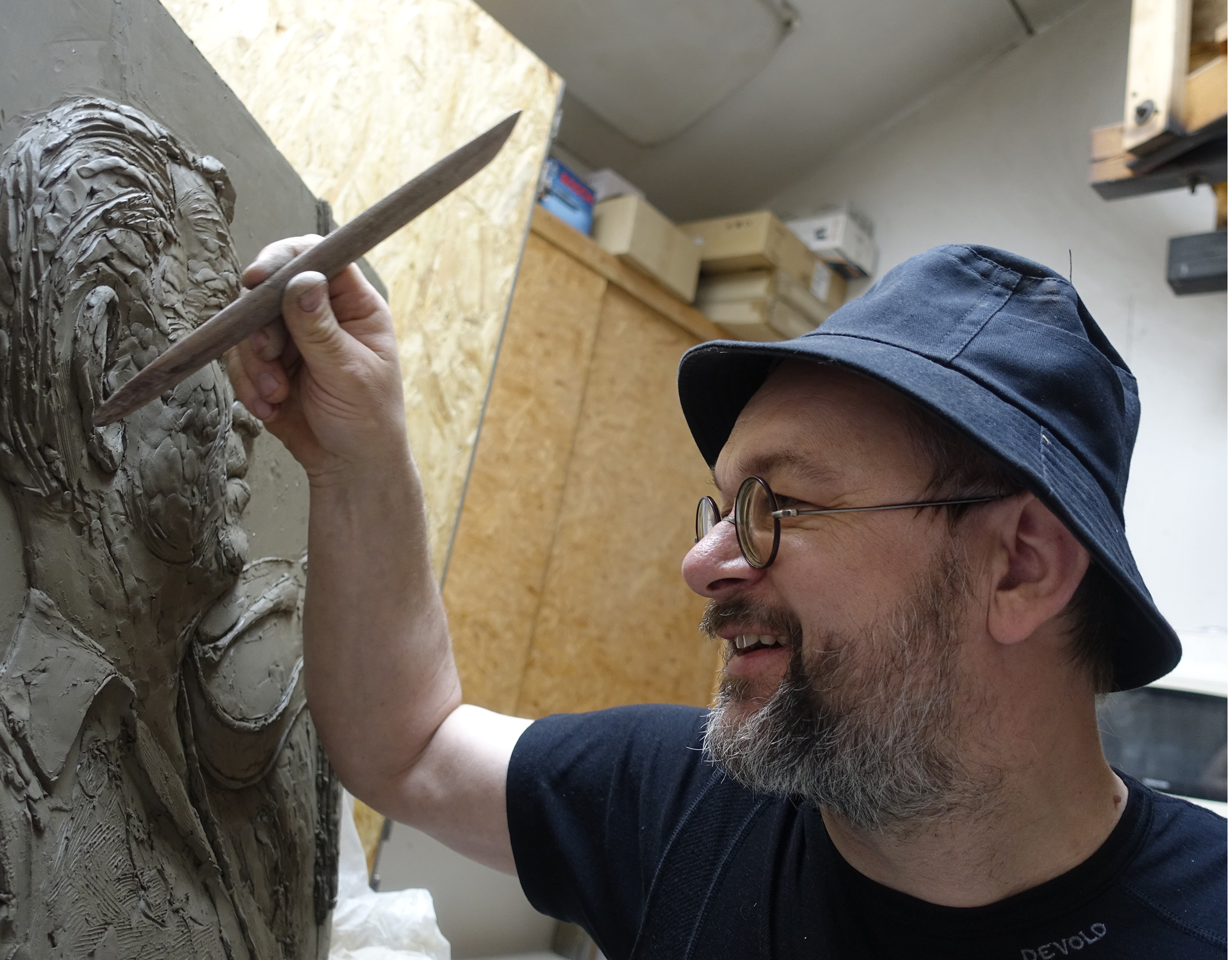
- Trubač in 2019
- Born: 23 January 1969 (age 57); Tábor, Czechoslovakia
- Education: Academy of Fine Arts, Prague
- Notable work: The Crown of St. Agnes of Bohemia; Reliquary of Pope John Paul II; The plaque of Otto Wichterle and Hana Wichterlová
- Website: trubacdaniel.cz

Daniel Ignác Trubač (born 23 January 1969) is a Czech academic sculptor and medalist. He is best known for his sculpture of The Crown of St. Agnes of Bohemia, which was moved to St. Peter's Basilica in the Vatican City on request of Pope Francis.

== Life ==
Trubač was born in Tábor. Until the age of 15 he lived in Nýrsko in the Bohemian Forest, then in 1983 he moved to Uherské Hradiště to study industrial design at the Secondary School of Applied Arts. His mother was an elementary school teacher and his father was a maker of eyeglasses in the company Okula Nýrsko.

In 1992 he lived in Belgium on a study stay at The Royal Academy of Fine Arts in Ghent. In 1994 he graduated from the atelier of figural sculpture at the Academy of Fine Arts, Prague.

Currently, he lives and works in his atelier and foundry in Polešovice. He has four children.

== Notable works ==
- The tombstone of Pavel Wonka, 1992.
- The relief decoration of seven bells for the St Martin's Cathedral in Bratislava, 2000.
- The plaque of Otto Wichterle and Hana Wichterlová, Prostějov, 2007. The plaque is placed on the house where the siblings lived.
- The relief decoration of three bells for the St. Vitus Cathedral in Prague, 2012.
- Reliquary of Pope John Paul II, 2017. The relic is the hair of Pope John Paul II put in a marble in the center of an arch in the shape of a heart.
- The Crown of St. Agnes of Bohemia, 2019. 30 years after the canonization of St. Agnes of Bohemia, this statue was made as a gift for Pope Francis from thousands of Czech pilgrims heading to Rome. The statue is cast from bronze and silver, containing fragments of glass in the Czech national colours. The lower part of the statue is decorated with ribbons covered with fingerprints of several pilgrims and more fingerprints are on paper scrolls inserted in the body of the statue. The statue was moved to the Chapel of the Patron Saints of Europe in St. Peter's Basilica in the Vatican City on request of Pope Francis.

== Gallery ==
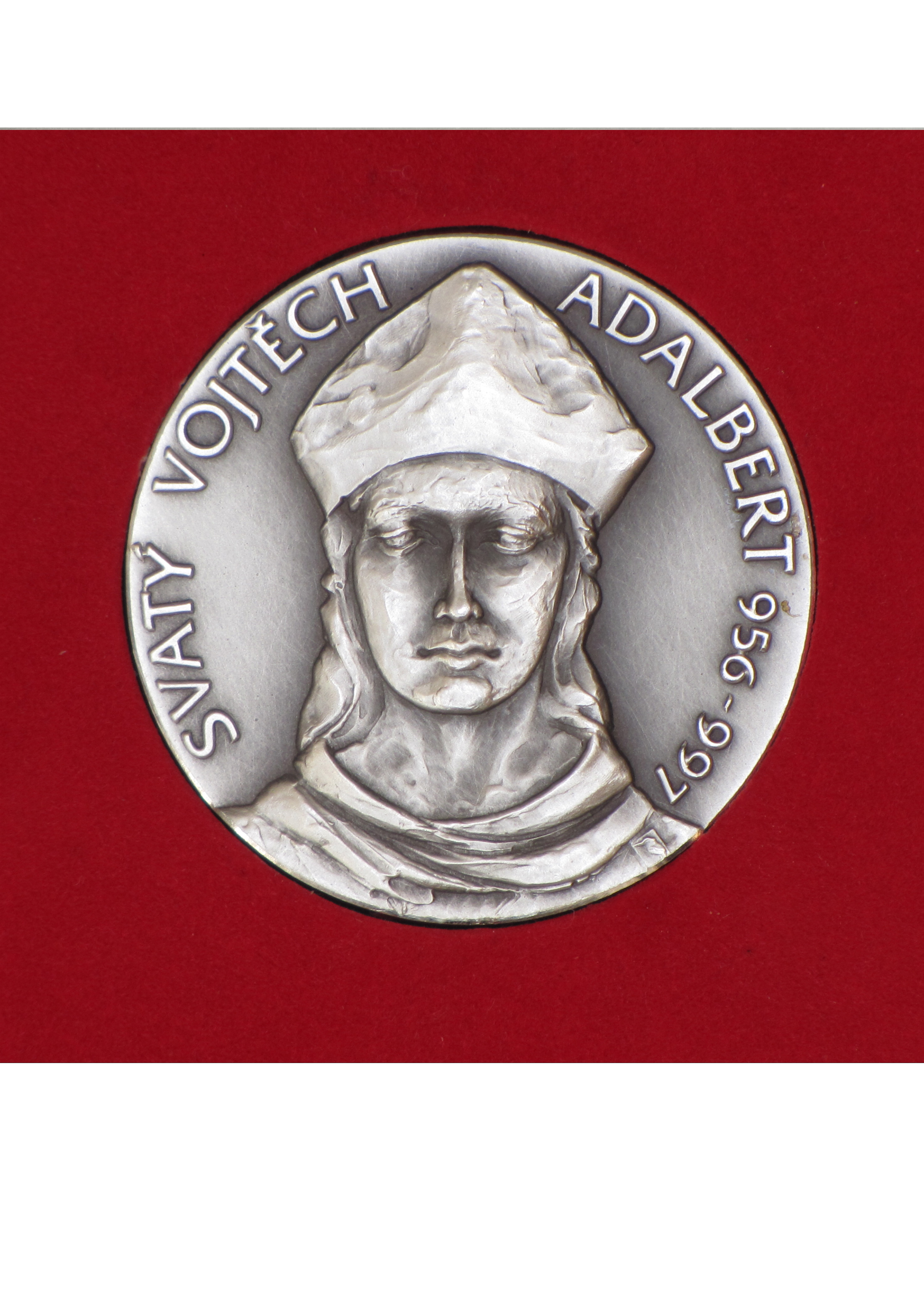
Honorary award - silver medal with Adalbert of Prague awarded by cardinal Dominik Duka, 2018

Reliquary of Pope John Paul II, 2017

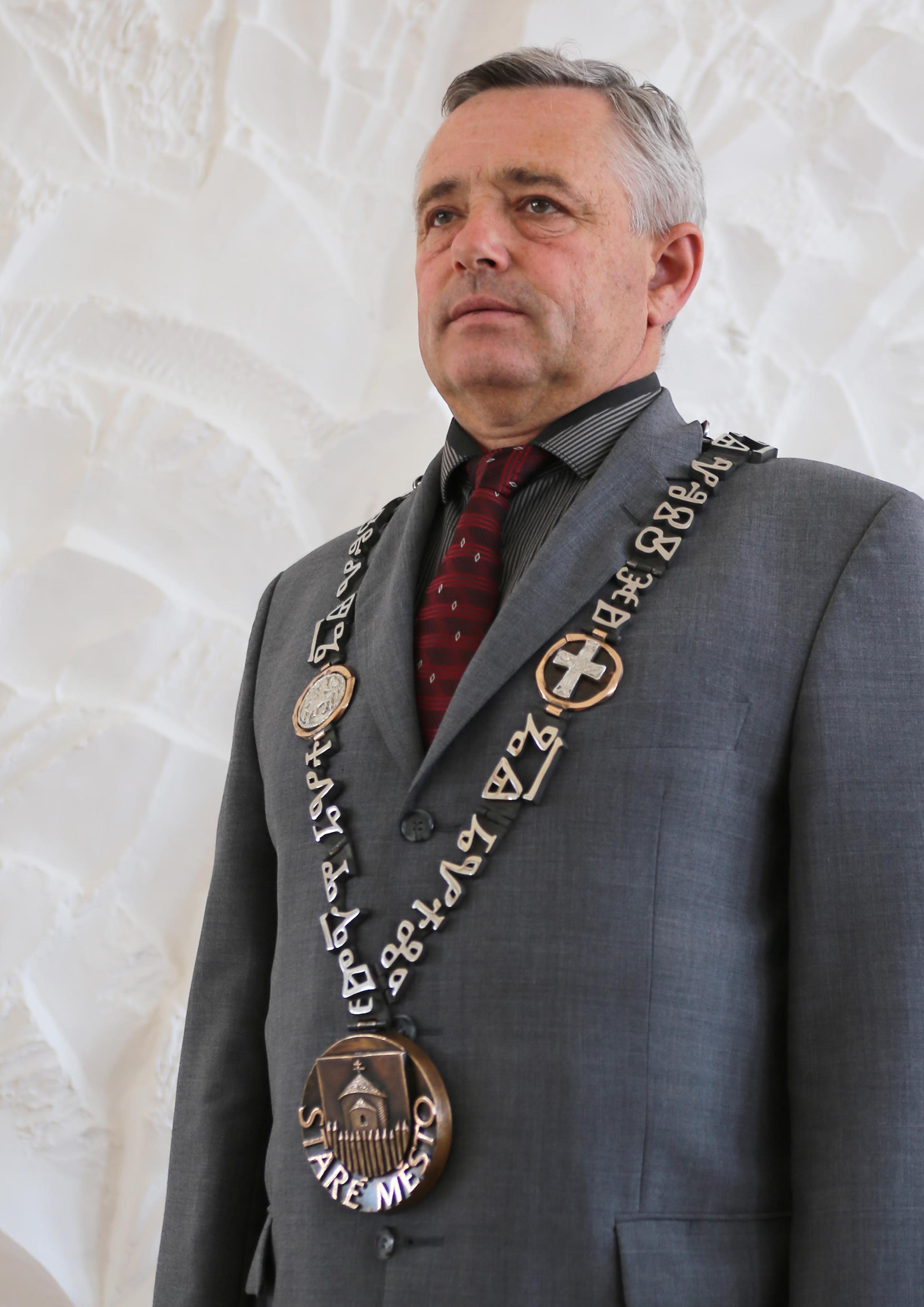
The insignia for the mayor of Staré Město, 2017

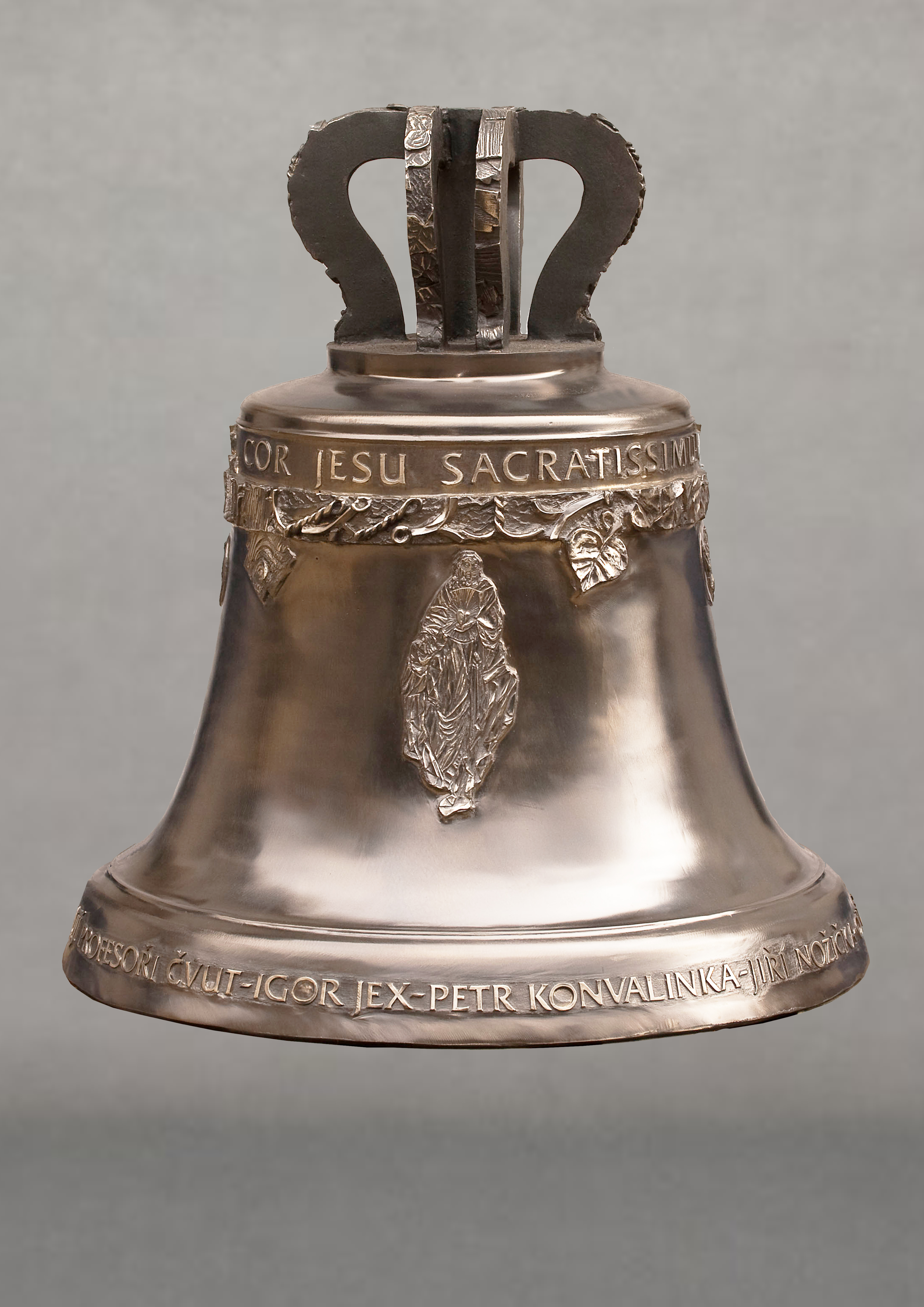
One of the bells in St. Vitus Cathedral, 2012

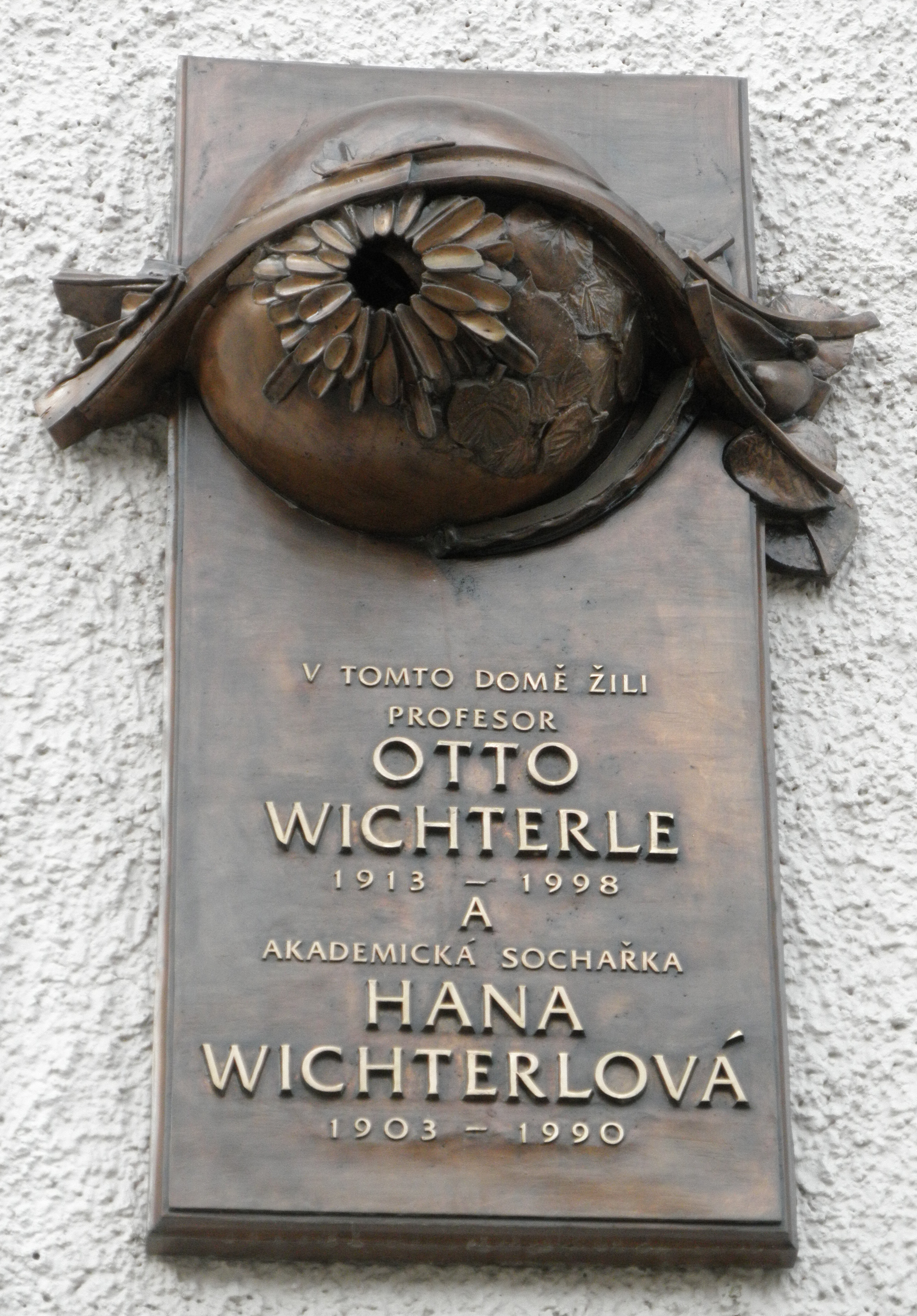
The plaque of Otto Wichterle and Hana Wichterlová, Prostějov, 2007

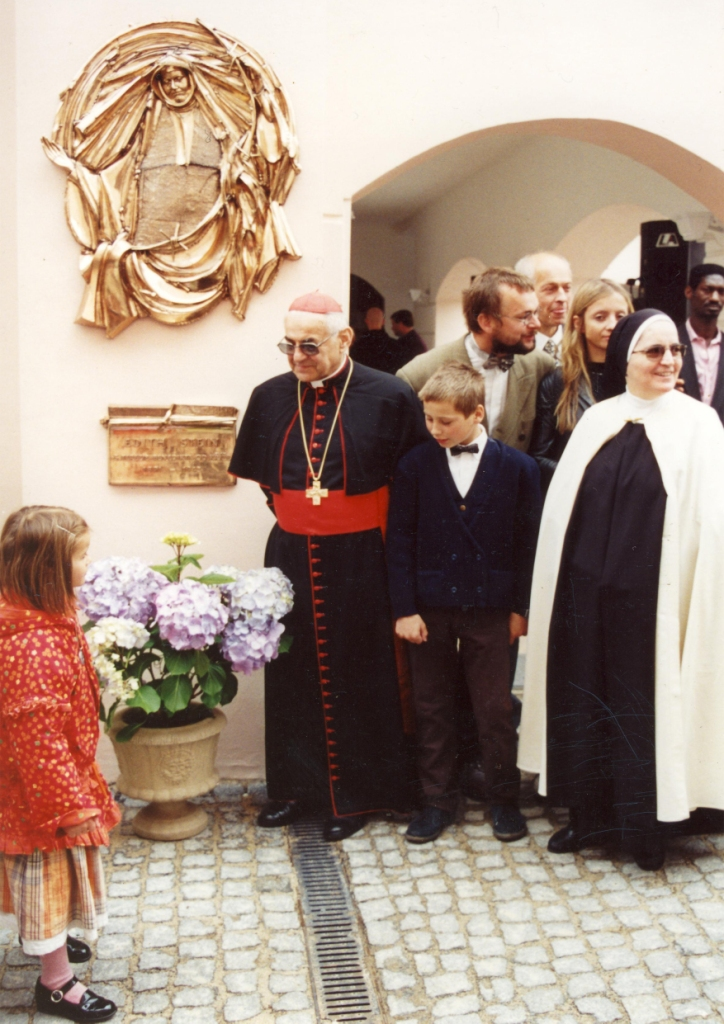
The relief of Saint Teresa Benedicta of the Cross, Prague, 2001

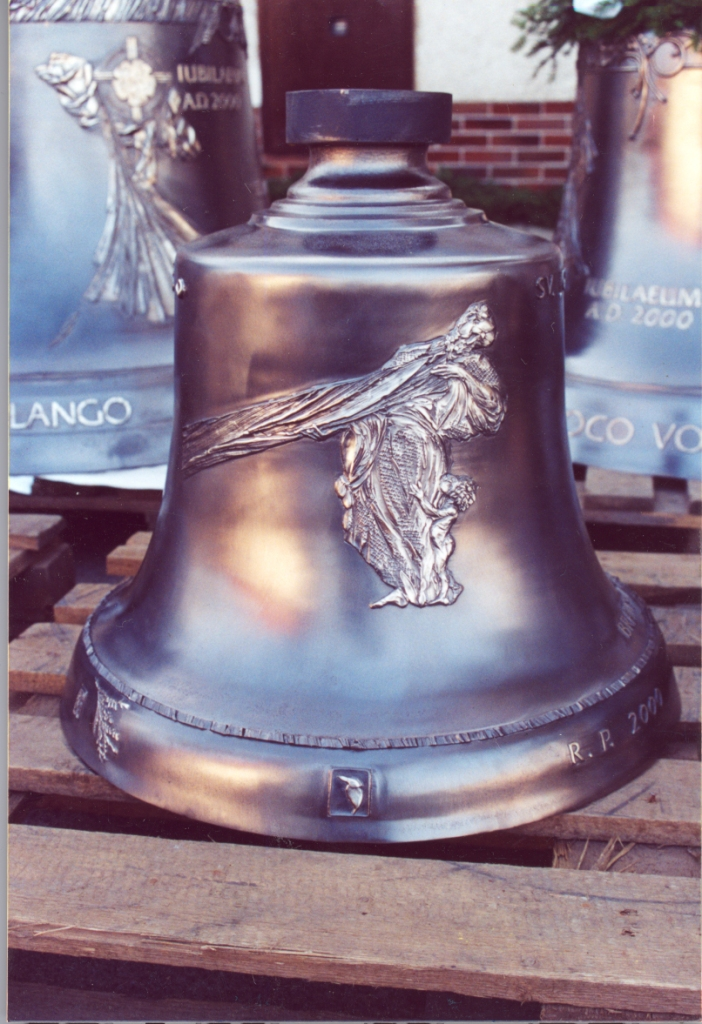
One of the bells in St Martin's Cathedral in Bratislava, 2000

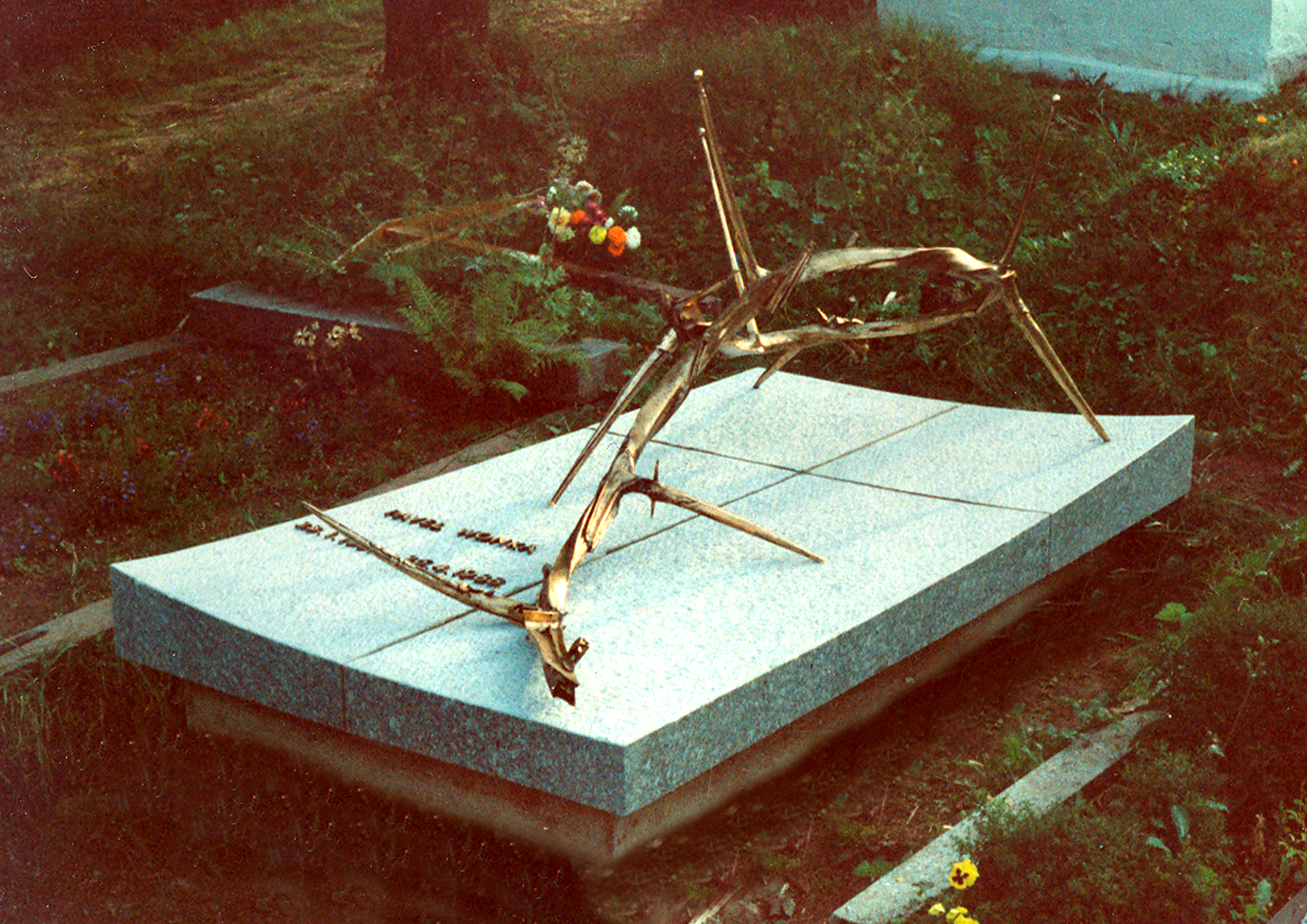
Pavel Wonka's tombstone, 1992
