= Duff McDonald =

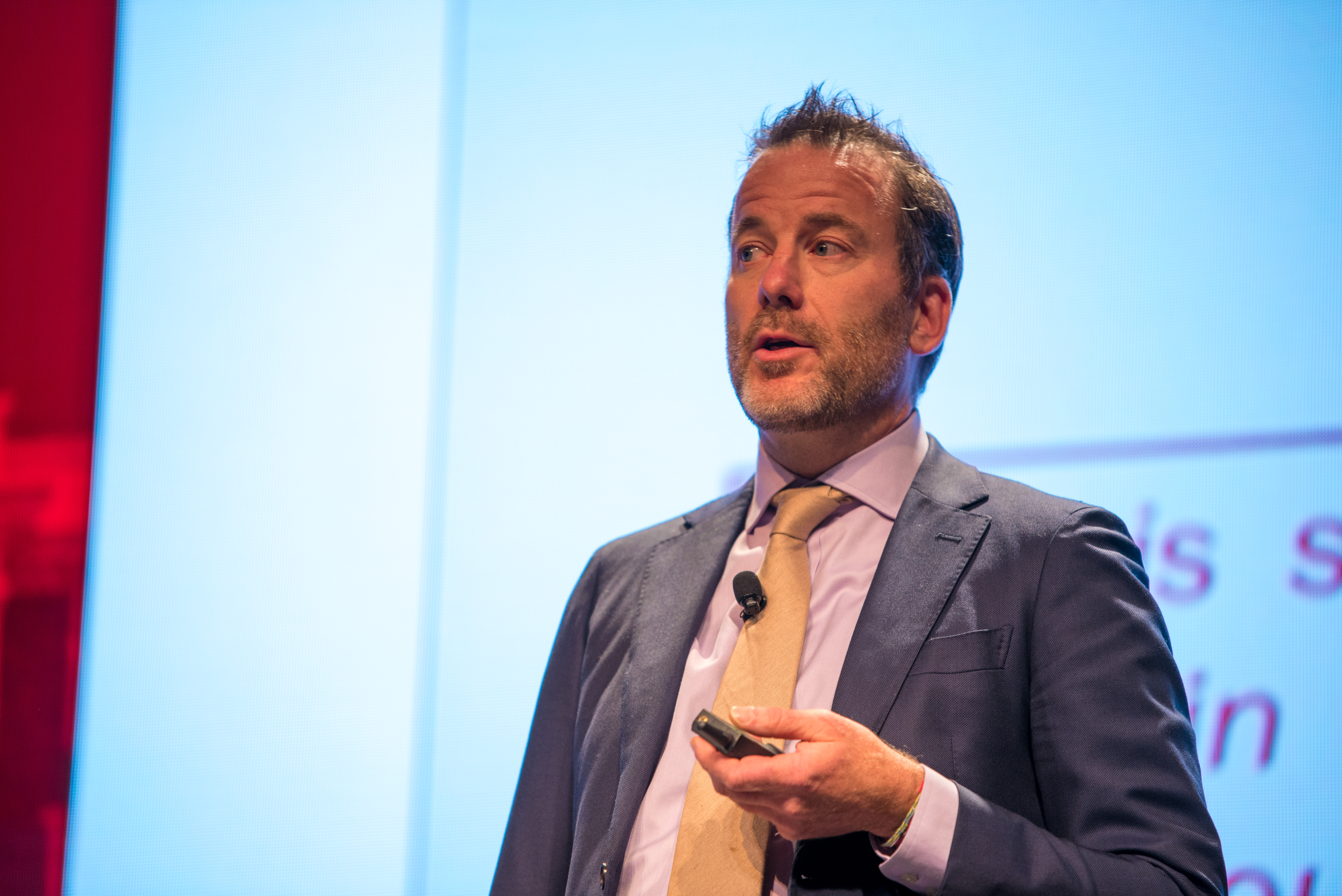
- Born: Toronto
- Education: University of Pennsylvania (BS in Finance)
- Occupations: Business journalist and writer
- Spouse: Caroline McDonald (divorced)
- Writing career
- Years active: 1995–present
- Genre: Non-fiction
- Notable works: The Firm; Last Man Standing; The Golden Passport
- Website: www.duffmcdonald.com

Duff McDonald is a Canadian American business journalist and writer based in New York.

== Early life and education ==
McDonald was born in Toronto. He attended University of Pennsylvania from 1988 to 1992 and majored in Finance.

== Career ==
His first job after university was at Goldman Sachs. By 2009, he published Last Man Standing: The Ascent of Jamie Dimon and JPMorgan Chase which was a biography on Jamie Dimon. Later, he authored “The Firm: The Story of McKinsey and Its Secret Influence on American Business” which took a critical eye to the role and reputation of McKinsey & Co.

In 2017, he published The Golden Passport which heavily criticized the Harvard Business School.

== Awards ==
- 2004: Canadian National Magazine Awards for Conrad's Fall
  - Best Business Story (gold)
  - Best Investigative Reporting (silver)

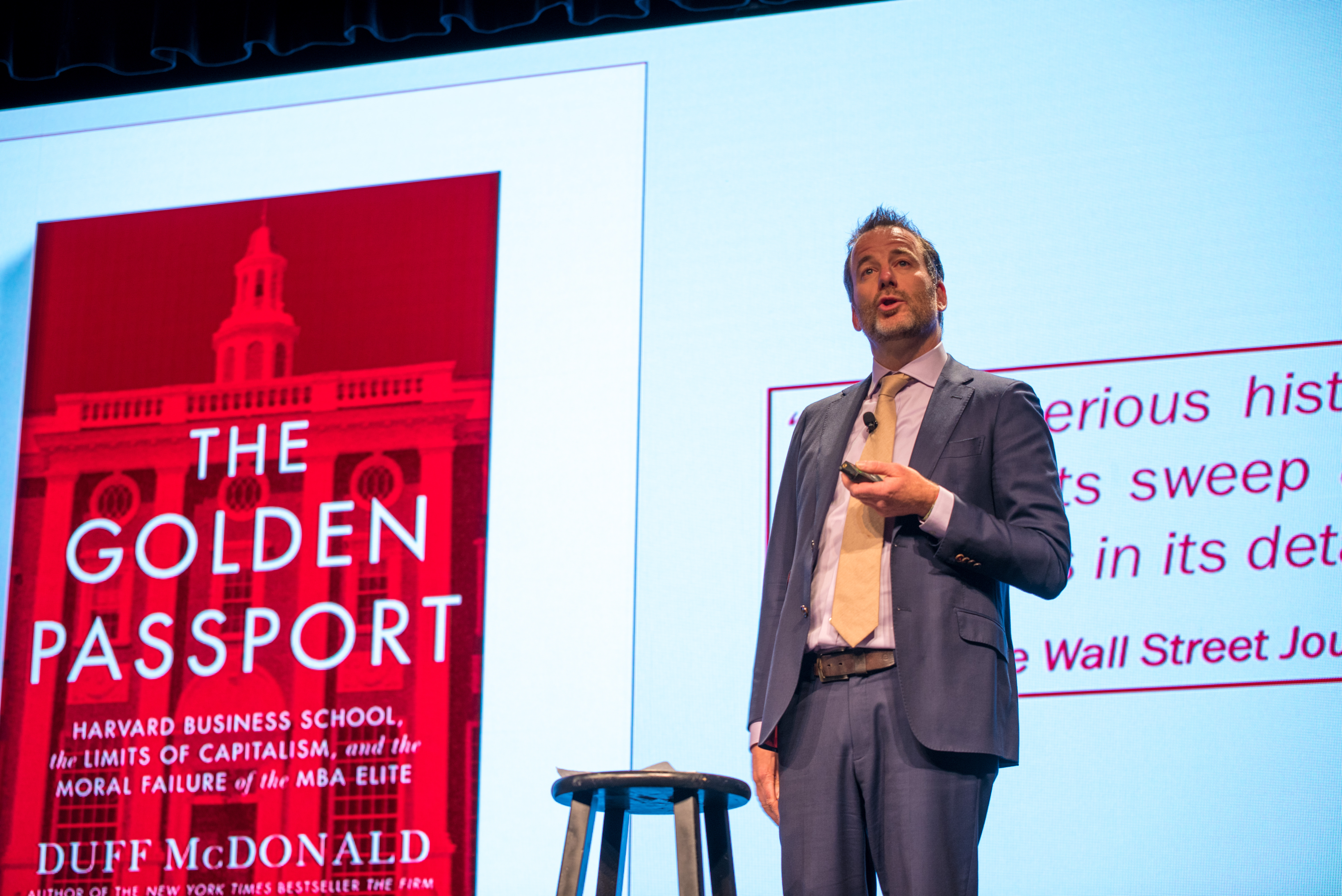
McDonald with his book The Golden Passport

== Works ==
- Last Man Standing: The Ascent of Jamie Dimon and JPMorgan Chase. New York City: Simon & Schuster. 2009. ISBN 978-1439109717.
- The CEO: An Interactive Book. New York City: Gallery Books. 2010. ISBN 978-1416900443. (co-written with Owen Burke)
- The Firm: The Inside Story of McKinsey, The World's Most Controversial Management Consultancy. New York City: Simon & Schuster. 2013. ISBN 978-1780743929.
- The Golden Passport: Harvard Business School, the Limits of Capitalism, and the Moral Failure of the MBA Elite. Harper Business. 2017.
