= Wonka =

Wonka may refer to:

- Willy Wonka, a fictional character who appears in Roald Dahl's 1964 children's novel Charlie and the Chocolate Factory and its film adaptations
  - Wonka Bar, a fictional chocolate bar produced by the Oompa Loompas of the Wonka Factory
  - Wonka (film), a 2023 musical fantasy film directed by Paul King exploring the origins of the character
  - Wonka (soundtrack), the soundtrack for the 2023 film
  - Wonka's The Golden Ticket, a 2026 reality competition television series
  - The Willy Wonka Candy Company, or simply "Wonka", former name of Nestlé Candy Shop, whose trademarks are now owned by Ferrero Candy Company, a defictionalized version of the Wonka brand
- Pavel Wonka (1953–1988), Czechoslovak liberal political activist, dissident, human rights activist, and anti-communist
- Salif Wonka (born 1982), birth name of French rapper Salif
- Wonka VM, an open-source, portable, embedded implementation of the Java virtual machine specification

== See also ==
- Willy Wonka (disambiguation)
- World Organization of Family Doctors (WONCA), a global not-for-profit professional organization
