= Willy Wonka and the Chocolate Factory (disambiguation) =

Willy Wonka and the Chocolate Factory may refer to:

- Willy Wonka & the Chocolate Factory, 1971 film
- Tom and Jerry: Willy Wonka and the Chocolate Factory, 2017 animated film

== See also ==
- Charlie and the Chocolate Factory (disambiguation)
- Willy Wonka (disambiguation)
