= Tunnels of Tábor =

Tunnels of Tábor, sometimes referred to as "catacombs", are a complex of tunnels in Tábor in the Czech Republic. This popular tourist sight was created in the 15th century by digging cellars called "loch", under houses in the historic centre of Tábor. Many cellars were connected and created a kind of a labyrinth. Some of the cellars reach a considerable size. Thanks to the constant and relatively low temperature and constant humidity, the cellars were used for storing foodstuff, especially beer. In the case of an enemy threat or large fires, people also used them as a safe shelter. Part of the underground space, winding through under Žižkovo Square in the length of 800 m (2,600 ft), was after World War II made accessible to visitors.

== Legend ==
The visitors, who decide to go through the open route of the underground corridors and tunnels, they do not even know what a treasure is beneath their feet. According to a legend, the underground of the old town completely bored tunnels and corridors. Somewhere in the middle of them, there is the accessible place, allegedly the hidden Tábor's ark. According to some scholars, the Hussites in the times of leader Jan Žižka were carried this ark before the army. It is loaded with tremendous energy, which made the Hussite army became invincible. According to one version, the French Templars brought it to Bohemia. The catacombs of Tábor are still waiting for someone to reveal their hidden heart.

== History ==
Since the beginning of the Hussite settlement, the town cellars originated as an integral part of the economic base of a medieval house. The cellars were used to hide from fires, which in the past several heavily damaged the town. The area of Tábor's cellars is admirable. Some sources indicate an overall length of up to 14 kilometres (9 mi). In many places they create three floors underground. Temperature here is all the year around 10 °C. In 1947, Vojtěch Kraupner suggested connecting the cellars of several houses. A tour for visitors with length about 500 metres was made. The tour starts in the basement of the old town hall, which is also located lapidary, and follows the line of houses on the southern and eastern side Žižkovo Square. The end of the underground corridors is in house No. 6 on the north side of the square.
