= Willy Wonka (disambiguation) =

Willy Wonka is a character from the 1964 Roald Dahl novel Charlie and the Chocolate Factory and its sequel Charlie and the Great Glass Elevator.

Willy Wonka may also refer to:

- Willy Wonka & the Chocolate Factory, the 1971 film adaptation of Dahl's novel
  - Roald Dahl's Willy Wonka (musical), a 2004 stage musical based on the first novel and first film.
  - Charlie and the Chocolate Factory (franchise), also called the Willy Wonka franchise
  - The Willy Wonka Candy Company, a British candy brand based on the fictional company from Dahl's novel
  - Willy's Chocolate Experience, a viral unlicensed event based on the Charlie and the Chocolate Factory franchise
- "Willy Wonka", a 2017 song by Macklemore featuring Offset

== See also ==
- Willy Wonka and the Chocolate Factory (disambiguation)
- Charlie and the Chocolate Factory (disambiguation)
- Wonka (disambiguation)
