= Tábor =

Town in South Bohemian Region, Czech Republic

- Town
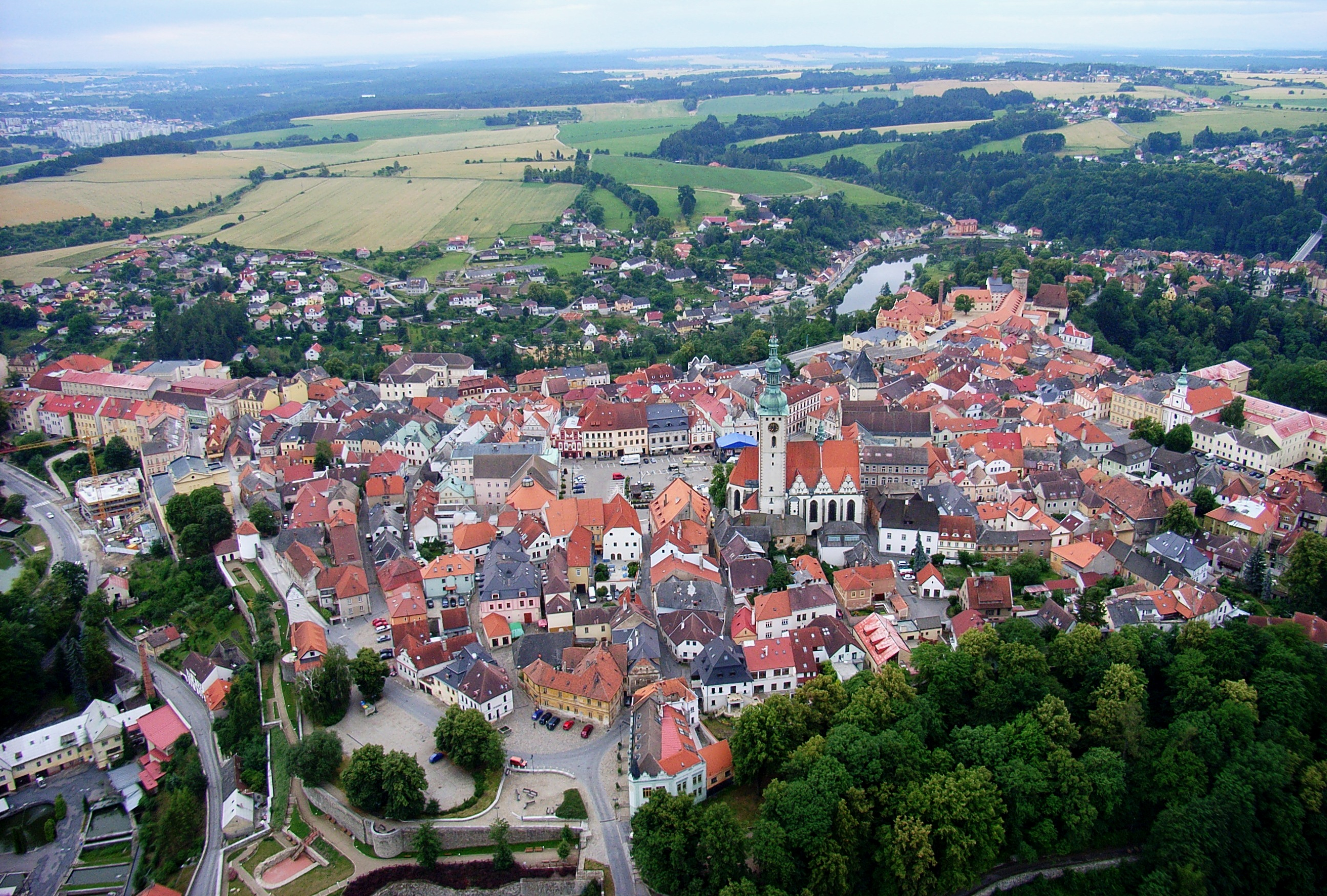
- Aerial view of the old town

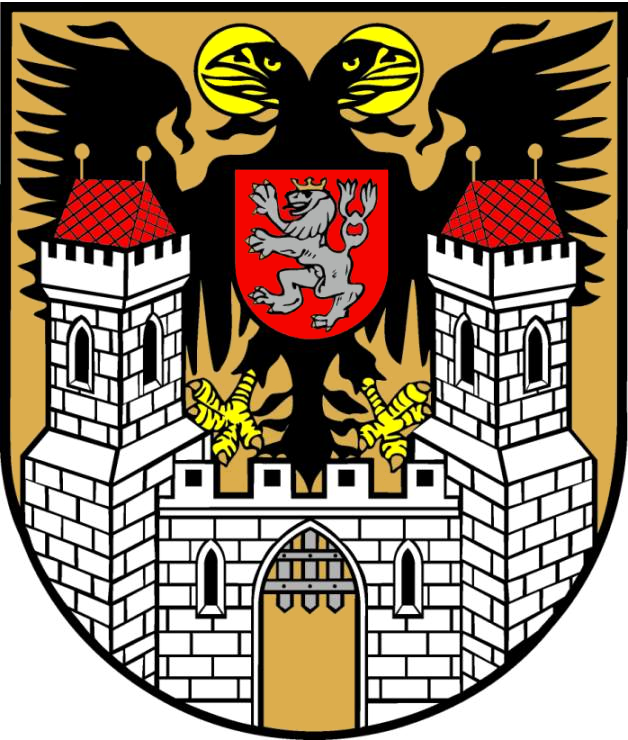
- Flag Coat of arms

- Location in the Czech Republic
- Coordinates: 49°24′52″N 14°39′28″E
- Country: Czech Republic
- Region: South Bohemian
- District: Tábor
- Founded: 1420

Government
  - Mayor: Štěpán Pavlík

Area
  - Total: 62.22 km^{2} (24.02 sq mi)
- Elevation: 437 m (1,434 ft)

Population (2026-01-01)
  - Total: 34,339
  - Density: 551.9/km^{2} (1,429/sq mi)
- Time zone: UTC+1 (CET)
  - Summer (DST): UTC+2 (CEST)
- Postal code: 390 01
- Website: www.taborcz.eu

Tábor (Czech pronunciation: [ˈtaːbor]; German: Tabor German pronunciation: [ˈtaːboːɐ̯]) is a town in the South Bohemian Region of the Czech Republic. It has about 34,000 inhabitants, making it the second most populous town in the region. It lies in the Tábor Uplands on the Lužnice River. The town is a road and railway junction.

Tábor was founded by the Hussites in 1420 and named after the biblical Mount Tabor. The historic town centre is well preserved and is protected as an urban monument reservation. The town has four national cultural monuments, including the Old Town Hall, which houses the Hussite Museum. Tábor Zoo is also one of the town's well-known tourist destinations.

== Administrative division ==
Tábor consists of 15 municipal parts (in brackets population according to the 2021 census):

- Tábor (25,625)
- Čekanice (1,355)
- Čelkovice (680)
- Hlinice (208)
- Horky (1,047)
- Klokoty (1,092)
- Měšice (1,759)
- Náchod (340)
- Smyslov (58)
- Stoklasná Lhota (180)
- Větrovy (393)
- Všechov (37)
- Zahrádka (49)
- Záluží (189)
- Zárybničná Lhota (348)

== Etymology ==
Although the town's Czech name translates directly to 'camp' or 'encampment', these words were derived from Tábor's name, and the town was named after the biblical Mount Tabor located in Israel. The town also gave its name to the Taborites, a radical wing of the Hussites. Tábor was initially called Hradiště hory Tábor (lit. 'fortified settlement of the Tábor mountain').

== Geography ==
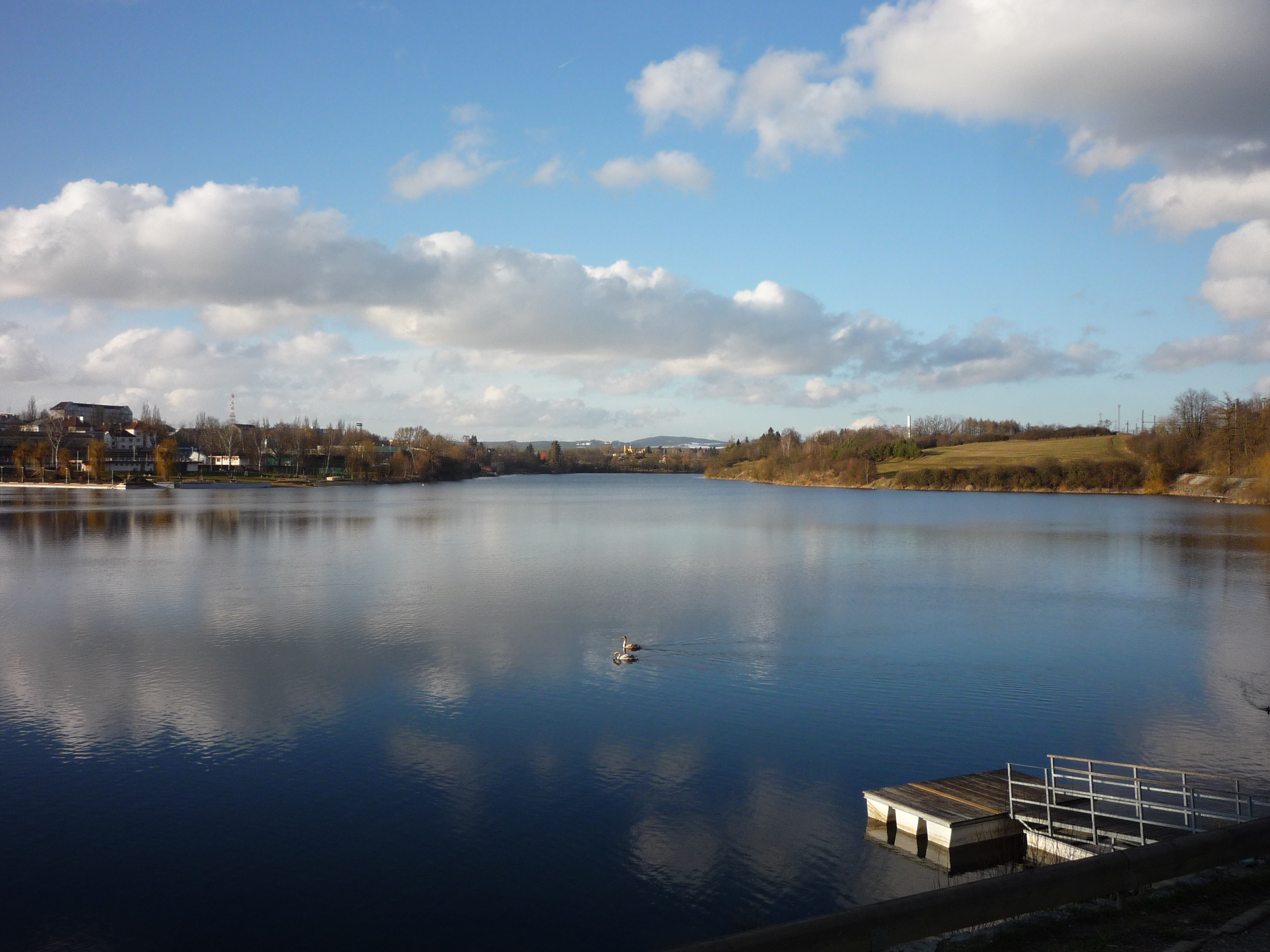
Jordán Reservoir

Tábor is located about 50 kilometres (31 mi) north of České Budějovice and 70 km (43 mi) south of Prague. It lies in the Tábor Uplands. The highest point is the Hýlačka hill at 525 m (1,722 ft) aboce sea level. The Lužnice River flows through the town. The historic old town is situated on a hill above the river, which was used for the protection of the town.

In the middle of the town lies the Jordán Reservoir, which was created in 1492 and named after the biblical Jordan River. It was originally used for storage of water, but nowadays it is mainly used for recreation. It is the oldest reservoir in Central Europe. There are also many fishponds in the municipal territory.

== History ==
The area is known to have been settled since the early Iron Age (6th–5th century BC). The next permanent settlement is documented in the Middle Ages. In around 1270, a short-lived settlement called Hradiště (meaning 'gord') was founded, which was destroyed most likely in a rebellion against King Ottokar II in 1276.

Tábor was founded in the spring of 1420, probably by Petr Hromádka of Jistebnice and other members of the most radical wing of the Hussites, who became known as the Taborites. Soon after the Taborites were victorious in the Battle of Tábor. The fortified settlement became the base from which the Hussites led their victorious expeditions. After the defeat of the Hussites in the Battle of Lipany, the Taborites reconciled with King Sigismund, and in 1437, it was promoted by Sigismund to a royal town. In 1452, the town surrendered to the troops under the command of the country's steward of George of Poděbrady.

From the end of the 15th century, the rapid development of Tábor occurred, which began to look like a real town and formed into its present form. Most of its landmarks were built in the 16th century. Great fires in 1532 and 1559 destroyed most of the citizens' houses which were usually made of wood, but the fires also became an impetus for further construction development.

In 1547, the town refused to provide military assistance to King Ferdinand I in his campaign against the German Lutherans. Ferdinand I punished Tábor by confiscation of vast lands which were the source of prosperity of the town. After the Battle of White Mountain in 1620 the town did not surrender to the rule of King Ferdinand II and so the Imperial Army under the command of general Marradas began the half-year long siege that ended in November 1621 when the town surrendered mainly due to lack of food. In 1648, the town was stormed and looted by Swedish army. After the Thirty Years' War, a long period of peace occurred and the town recovered. In the mid-17th century, the monks from the Order of Discalced Augustinians were invited to spread the Catholic faith.

Until 1918, "Tabor – Tábor" was part of Austria-Hungary, in the district with the same name, one of the 94 Bezirkshauptmannschaften in Bohemia.

== Demographics ==
Historical population

Year	Pop.	±%
1869	10,339	—
1880	11,251	+8.8%
1890	12,652	+12.5%
1900	15,155	+19.8%
1910	17,495	+15.4%

Year	Pop.	±%
1921	18,204	+4.1%
1930	19,425	+6.7%
1950	23,696	+22.0%
1961	24,528	+3.5%
1970	27,181	+10.8%

Year	Pop.	±%
1980	31,867	+17.2%
1991	36,342	+14.0%
2001	36,557	+0.6%
2011	34,430	−5.8%
2021	33,360	−3.1%

Source: Censuses

== Economy ==
The Tábor Hospital is by far the largest employer based in the town. The largest industrial employer is Brisk Tábor, producer of spark plugs. The tradition of this production in Tábor dates back to 1935.

There is a military base that hosts 42nd Mechanized Battalion of the 4th Rapid Deployment Brigade. Czech Armed Forces Territorial Command headquarters is also located in the town.

== Transport ==
Tábor is a significant transport hub. It lies on the D3 motorway that is part of the European route E55 that connect it with Prague and České Budějovice. The other important road is the I/19 that connect Tábor with Plzeň, Písek, Pelhřimov and the D1 motorway in Humpolec.

The town also lies on the mainline railway linking Prague with České Budějovice and Linz and local branch lines to Písek, Pelhřimov and Bechyně. The Tábor–Bechyně railway, built in 1903, was the first electrified railway line in Austria-Hungary.

Tábor is also hub for a bus transportation network in the Tábor District and the northern part of the South Bohemian Region with bus terminal constructed just next to the train station.

== Sport ==
The local football club FC Silon Táborsko plays in the second-level Czech National Football League.

Tábor is also equipped with a winter stadium. The local ice hockey club, HC Tábor, plays in the second-level ice hockey league.

Other sport facilities in Tábor include a swimming pool and the Komora sports complex.

The town hosts Cyklokros Tábor, an annual cyclo-cross race that is part of the UCI Cyclo-cross World Cup.

== Sights ==
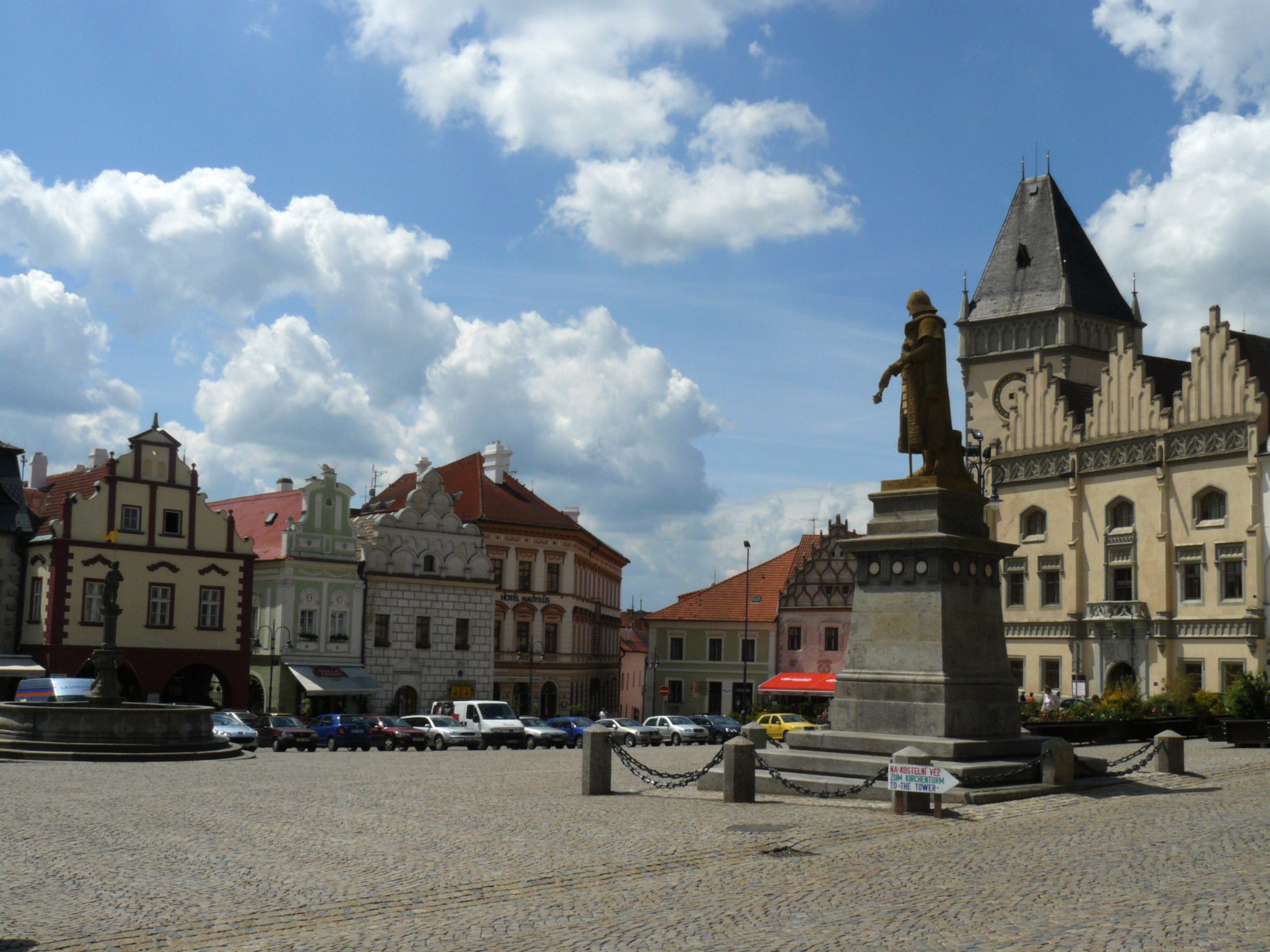
Žižkovo náměstí with the Old Town Hall (right)

Though a large part of the ancient fortifications has been demolished, Tábor still preserves many memorials of its past fame. The historical centre is formed by the square Žižkovo náměstí and adjacent streets, and is delimited by remains of the town walls. Only very narrow streets lead to it; this rendered the approach to the square more difficult in times of war. Many architecturally valuable burgher houses decorated by frescos, sgraffiti and gables are preserved, and represent almost all architectural styles.

Tábor is rich in monuments. There are four monuments, protected as national cultural monuments: Old Town Hall, Kotnov Castle with the Bechyně Gate, the monastery in Tábor-Klokoty with the Church of the Assumption of the Virgin Mary, and the Altar Wings of Roudníky in the Hussite Museum.

=== Town fortifications ===
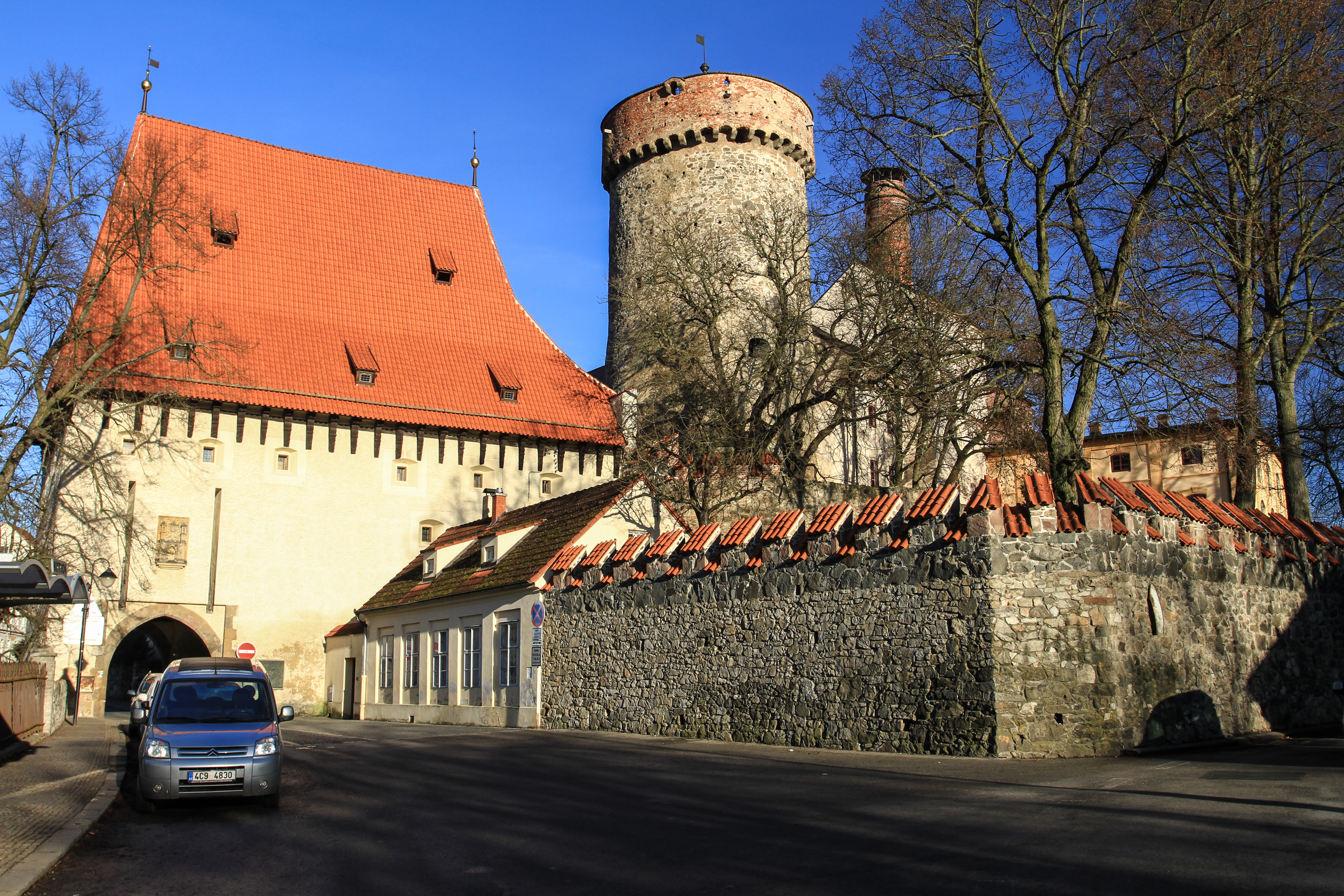
Kotnov Tower and Bechyně Gate

The Kotnov Castle was probably founded at the end of the 13th century and was first documented in 1370. It was rebuilt into a brewery in the 16th century. The current appearance of the castle is the result of modifications made after 1860. Major parts of the town fortifications, including the Kotnov Tower and the Bechyně Gate near the tower, still exist. Kotnov Tower is a landmark on the town's skyline, and today it serves as an observation tower.

A labyrinth of tunnels lies under the houses and streets. The townspeople dug cellars under their houses, and these were subsequently interconnected; an approximately 500 metres (1,600 ft)-long section of the tunnel system is open to the public and is a part of the Hussite Museum.

=== Main square ===
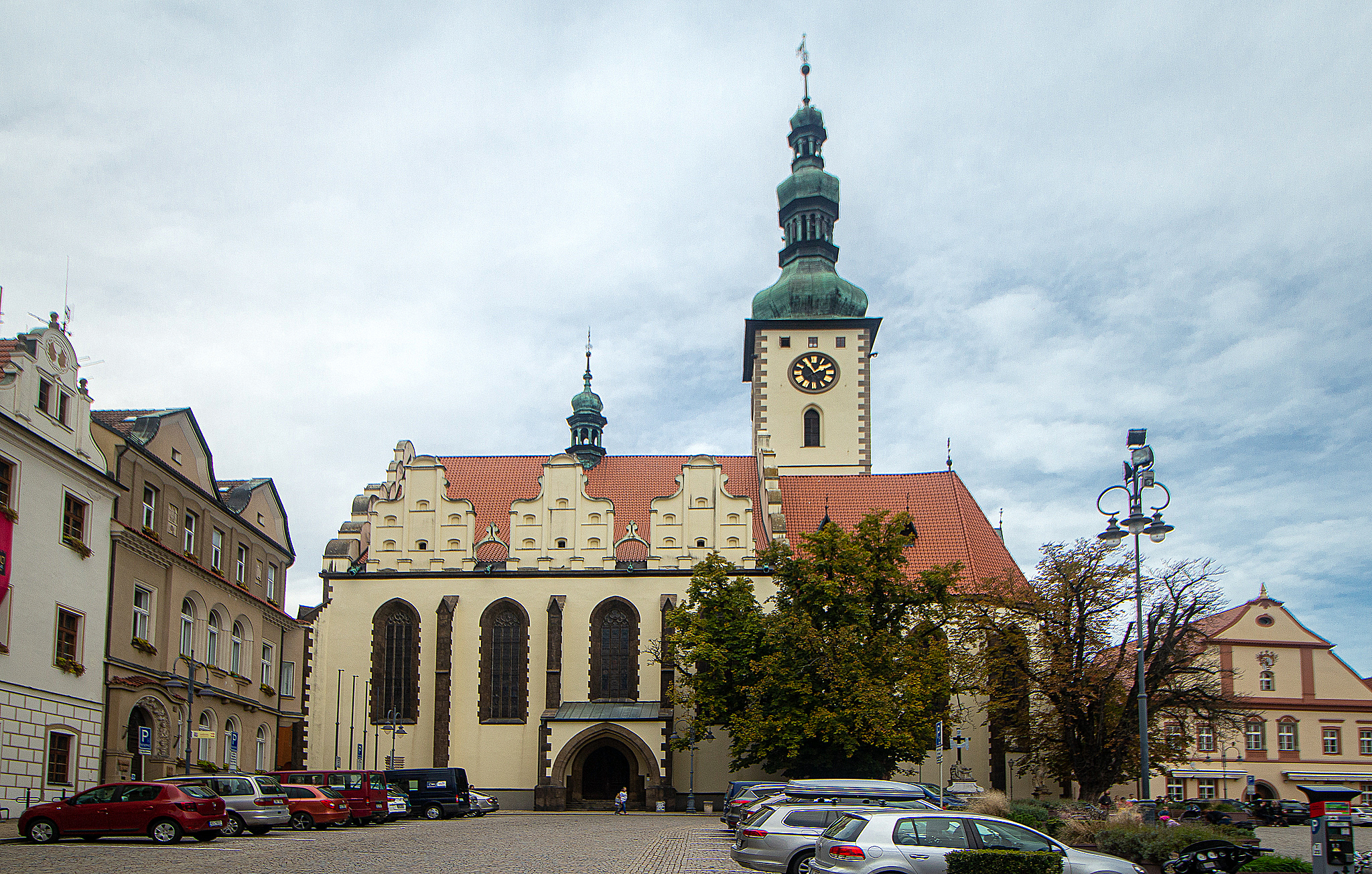
Church of the Transfiguration of Jesus on the Mount Tabor

The largest building on the square is the Dean Church of the Transfiguration of Jesus on the Mount Tabor. It was built in 1480–1512 in the style of the Bohemian Renaissance. In the centre of the square are a Renaissance fountain created in 1567–1568 and a statue of Jan Žižka, the greatest of the Hussite leaders. The statue was created in 1884 by Josef Strachovský and replaced a defective statue from 1877 by Josef Václav Myslbek.

The Old Town Hall was built in the late Gothic style in stages from 1420 to 1521. After it was damaged in the Thirty Year's War, it was reconstructed in the Baroque style, but in 1878 its late Gothic appearance was restored according to the plans by Josef Niklas, and since then no major alterations have been made. Since 1960, its premises have been used for the Hussite Museum and art galleries, and the largest and most representative hall is used for important cultural events. The museum contains interesting relics of the Hussite period such as the Altar Wings of Roudníky.

=== Ecclesiastical buildings ===
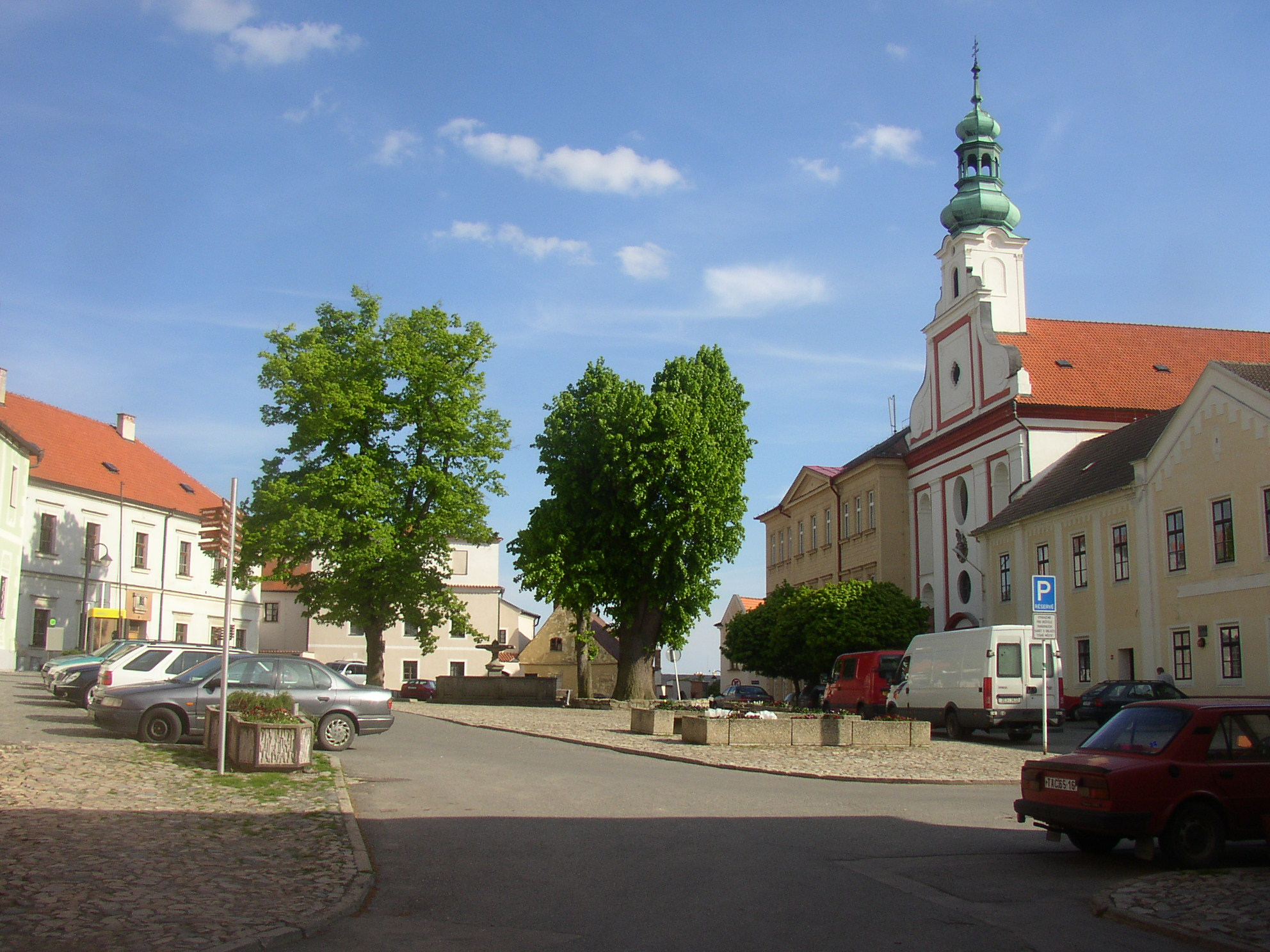
The square Náměstí Mikuláše z Husi with the monastery complex (right)

The second church in the historical centre is the Church of Nativity of the Virgin Mary in the complex of the Discalced Augustinian Monastery. The monastery complex was built on the site of abandoned houses in 1642–1666. The church has a Classical Baroque facade. At the beginning of the 19th century the monastery was closed down and the building was converted into a prison. Today, the local museum has its headquarters and depository there, and both the monastery and the church are inaccessible.

The former Church of Saints Philip and James is located below the town walls and is the oldest sacral building in Tábor. Its existence was first mentioned in 1377. It was originally a cemetery chapel, rebuilt as a Baroque church after 1744. Today it serves cultural purposes.

The Church of the Assumption of the Virgin Mary in Klokoty is a Baroque pilgrimage church. The church was built in 1700–1714 and in the following years, cloisters and chapels were added. It is one of the most valuable cultural monuments in the region. It still serves religious purposes. The way to it is lined with the Stations of the Cross.

=== Other cultural sights ===
Měšice Castle is located in Měšice village. It was built in 1545 as a Renaissance fortress and redesigned into the Baroque style in 1699.

=== Natural sights ===
In Klokoty, there is the Pod Klokoty Geological Exposition along the Lužnice.

On the east edge of the town, there is a rock formation called Granátová skála ('garnet rock'). The rock is a deposit of red garnets that can be as large as hazelnuts and is protected as a nature monument. The majority of the rock was mined and used as construction material.

Tábor Zoo in Větrovy is the largest zoological garden in the South Bohemian Region with the area of 10 ha (25 acres). It was opened in 2015. In 2023, it bred 81 species. In 2024, the zoo had more than 118,000 visitors.

The botanical garden in Tábor was founded in 1866, which makes it the second oldest in the country. It belongs to the neighbouring Secondary Agricultural School. It contains more than 4,000 plants and 400 trees. The seeds from there are sent to more than 400 places in the world. Most of the garden is occupied by an arboretum. There is a small lake and a rock garden. The three glasshouses contains cacti, succulents, orchids, carnivorous plants and many other exotic plants.

U Popraviště is the largest park in Tábor. The park is built around a former gallows, which was used in 1942 during World War II. There is a monument to 156 victims of repression by the Nazi German occupiers that was built in 1947–1948, which includes a bronze board with lions and bronze relief board with figures. The rest of the park was created in the 1980s.

== Notable people ==
- Johan Peter Wotapek von Ritterwald (1676–1763), judge
- Rosa Junck (1850–1929), Esperantist, educator and translator
- Oskar Nedbal (1874–1930), violinist, composer and conductor
- Petr Zenkl (1884–1975), politician
- Jiří Traxler (1912–2011), Czech-Canadian jazz pianist and composer
- Karel Černý (1922–2014), art director; lived and died here
- Bohumil Němeček (1938–2010), boxer, Olympic winner
- Ivana Markova (1938-2024), Czech-British social psychologist
- Rudolf V. Perina (1945–2018), American diplomat
- Jan Sovák (1953–2025), painter
- Jiří Balík (born 1953), agroscientist
- Jiří Lála (born 1959), ice hockey player
- Helena Fuchsová (born 1965), track and field athlete
- Daniel Ignác Trubač (born 1969), sculptor
- Radek Dvořák (born 1977), ice hockey player
- Jan Šimák (born 1978), footballer
- Jana Sedláčková (born 1993), footballer

== International relations ==
Tábor is a part of the Commonwealth of towns with hussite past and tradition, along with other 11 Czech and 6 German municipalities.

=== Twin towns – sister cities ===
Tábor is twinned with:

- Dole, France
- Konstanz, Germany
- Nové Zámky, Slovakia
- Orinda, United States
- Škofja Loka, Slovenia
- Wels, Austria

== Gallery ==
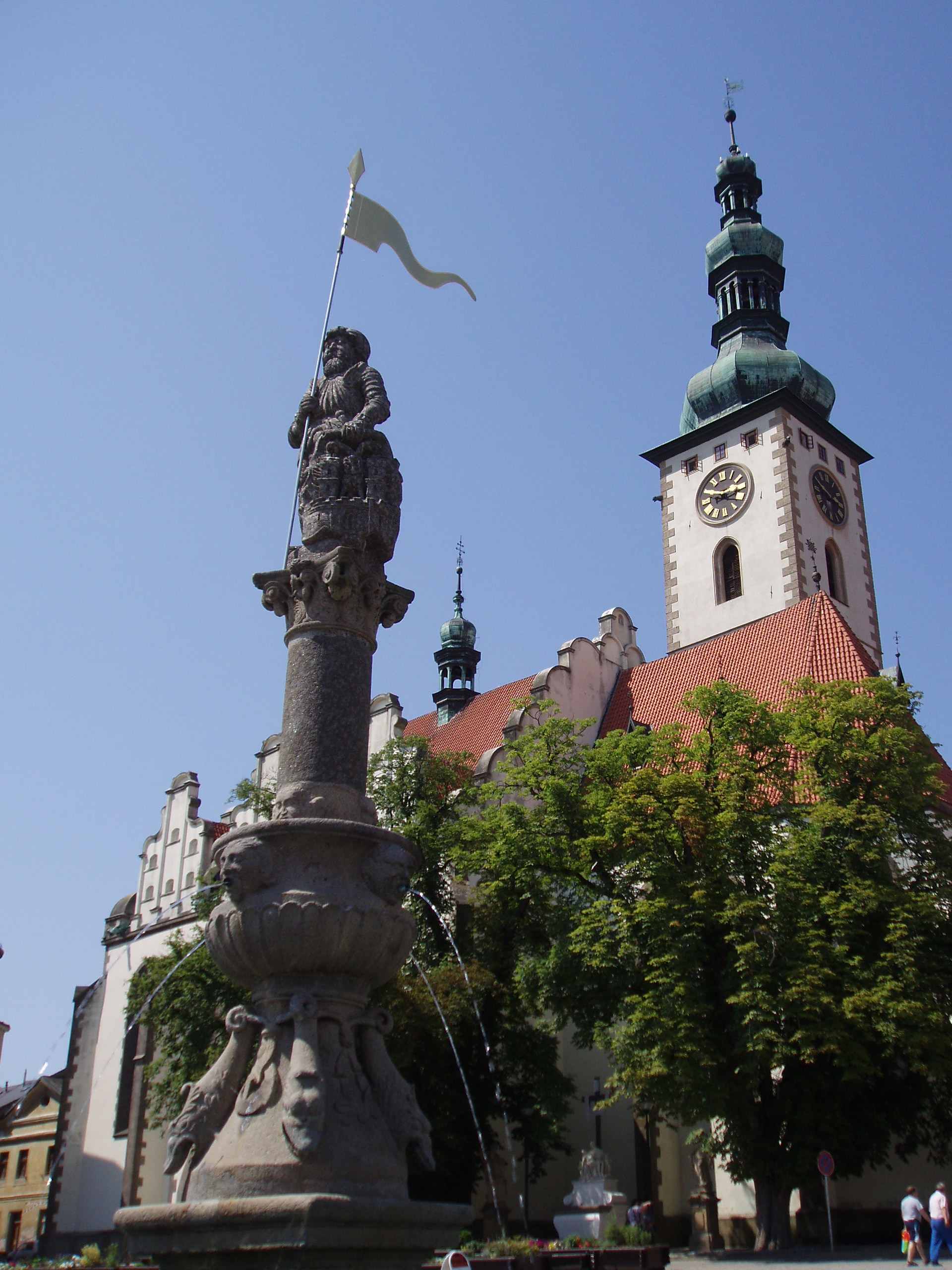
Church and statue of Roland

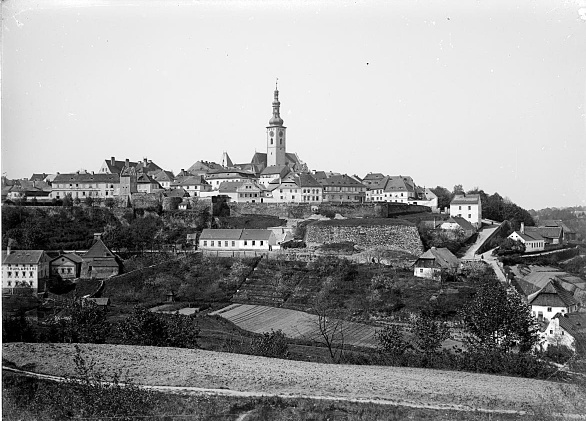
View of Tábor from the north, end of the 19th century, with well-visible town fortification, Ignác Šechtl

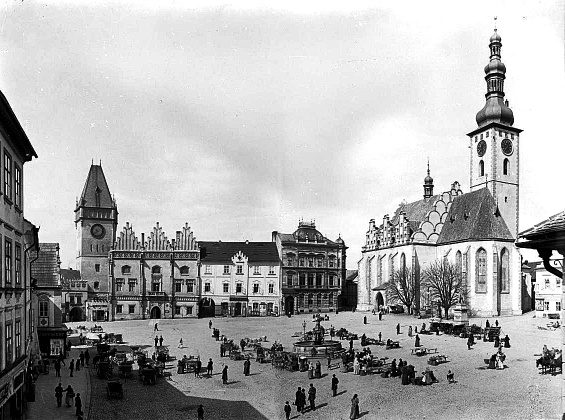
Žižkovo náměstí with town hall and church, 1895, Ignác Šechtl

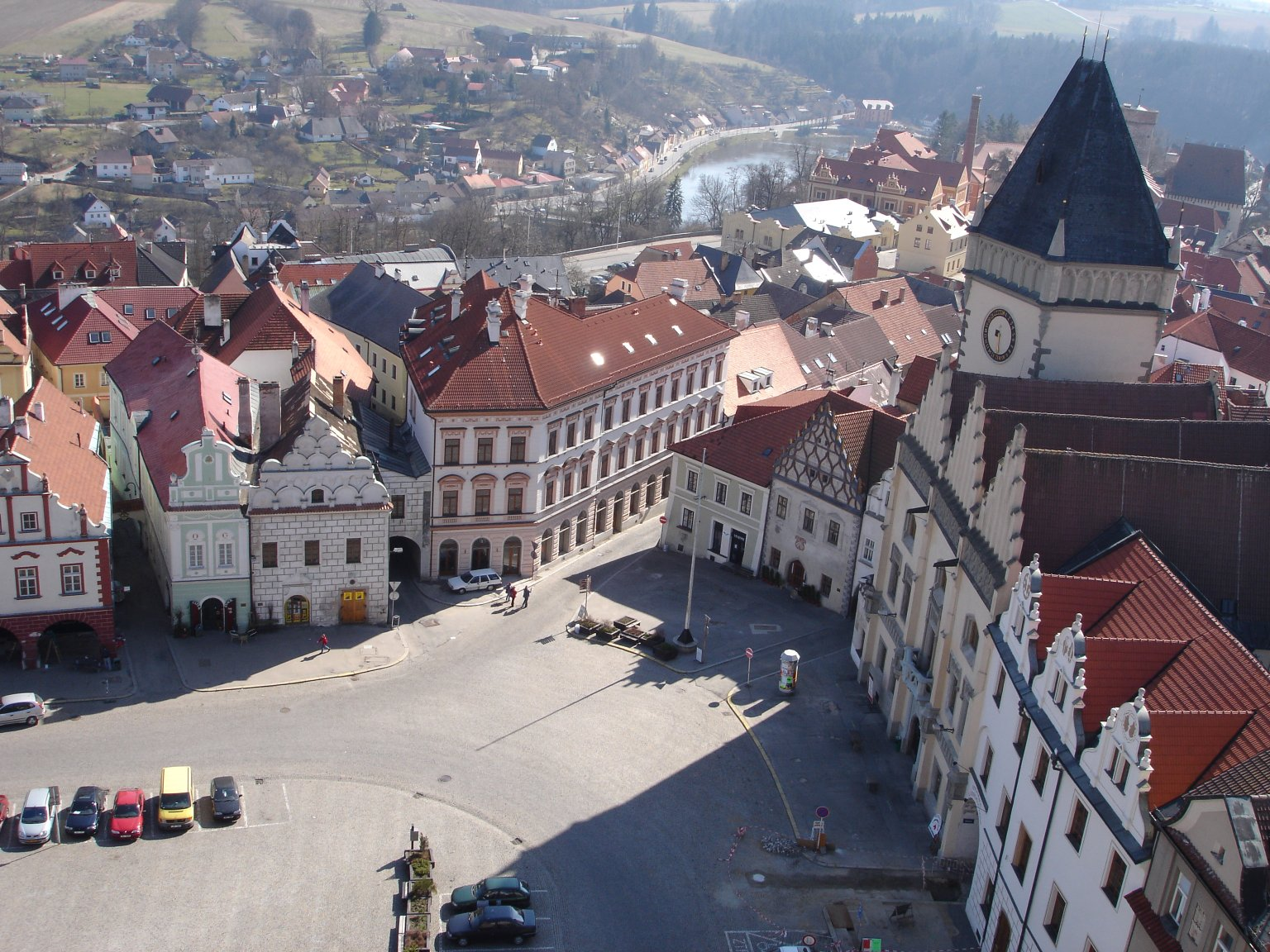
Southwest corner of Žižkovo náměstí as viewed from the church tower

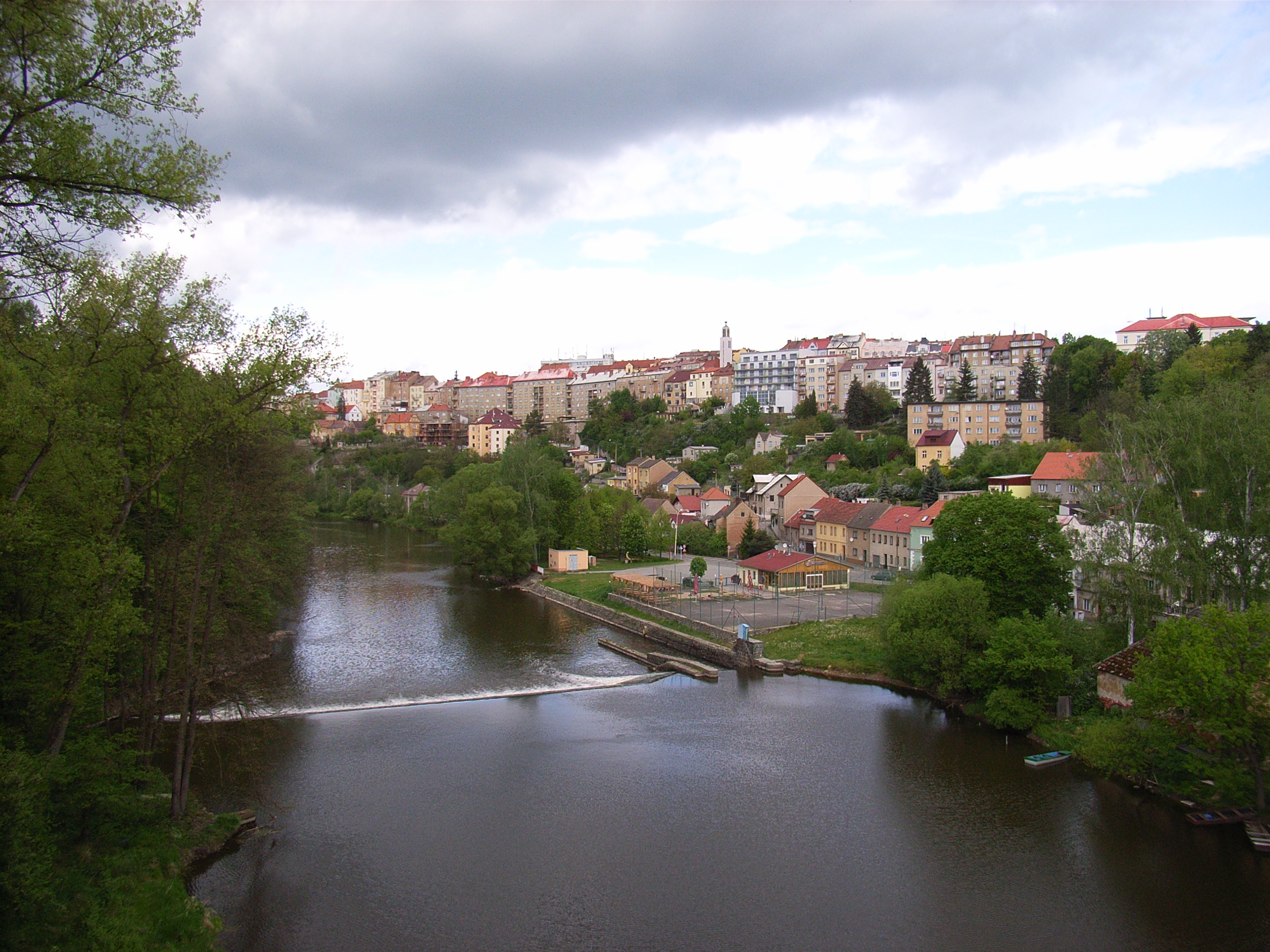
View of Tábor from the river Lužnice

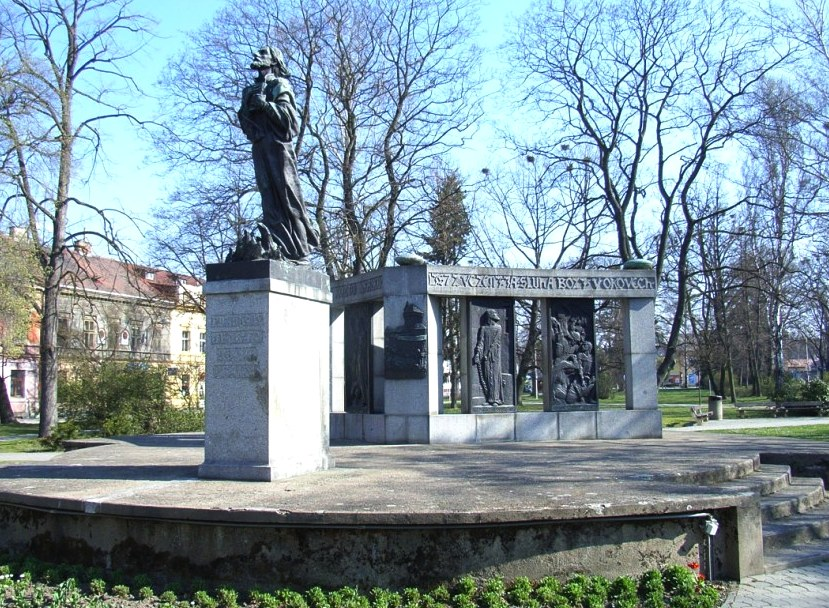
Monument to Jan Hus by sculptor František Bílek

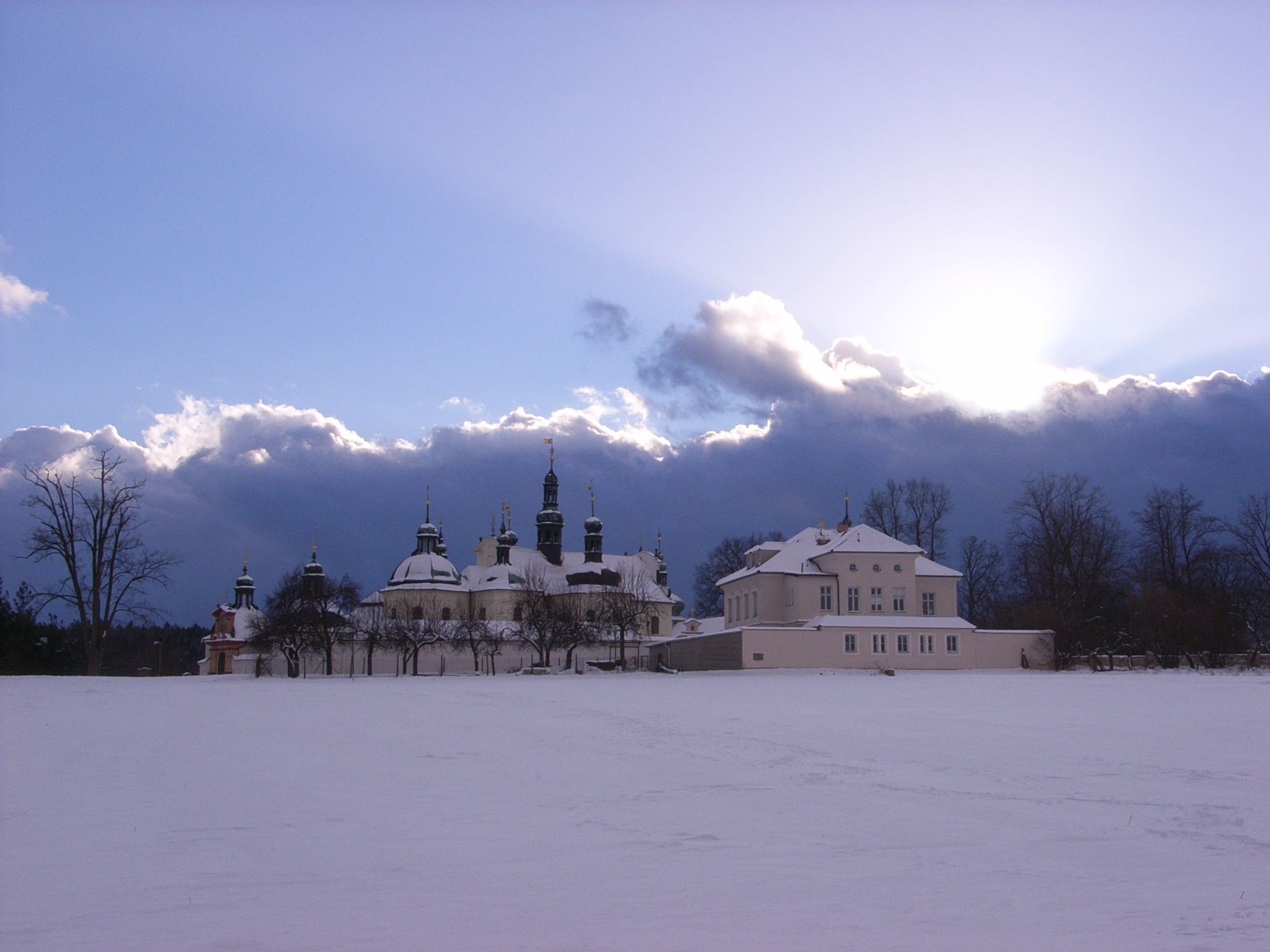
Pilgrimage church in Klokoty

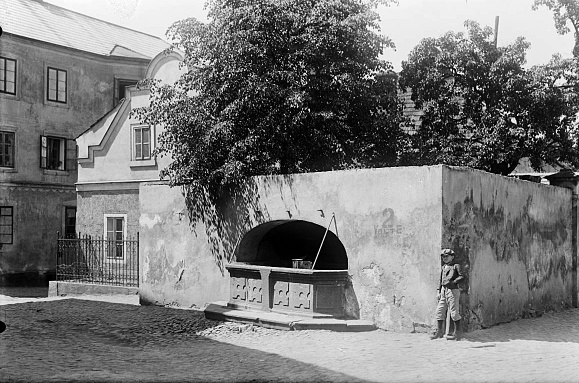
Old Town, Šechtl and Voseček

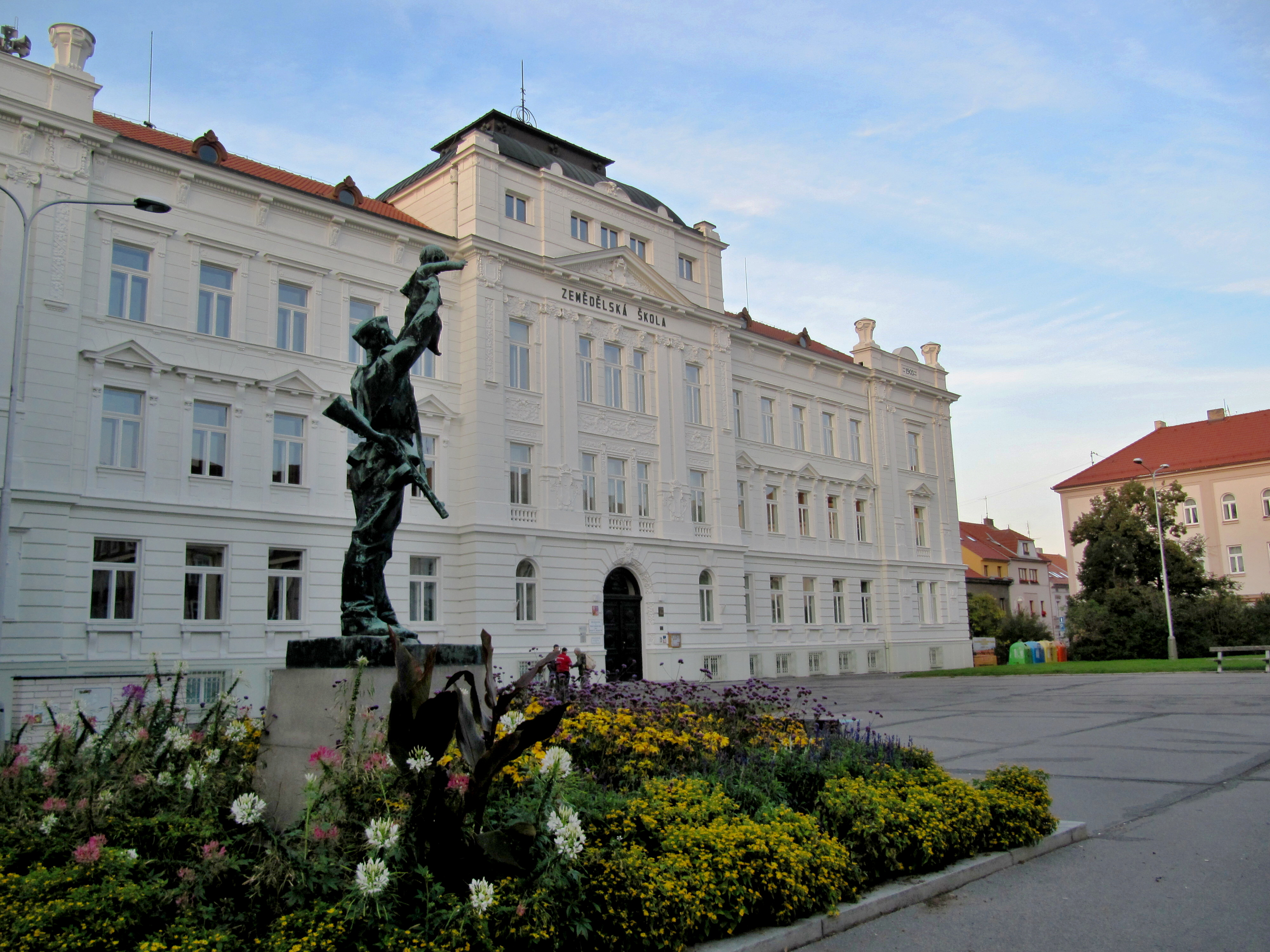
Higher Vocational School and Secondary Agricultural School Tábor
