= Korec (surname) =

Korec (feminine: Korcová or Korecová) is a Czech and Slovak surname. The word korec used to mean 'container' and referred to a volume measure (indicating the volume of a container), but it is also an old Czech area measure (2,837 m^{2} (30,540 sq ft)), so the surname may have originated as a designation for someone who had such a large field. There is also the surname Korecký with the same origin. Notable people with the surname include:

- Evžen Korec (born 1956), Czech businessman
- Ján Chryzostom Korec (1924–2015), Slovak Roman Catholic cardinal

== See also ==
- Bobby Korecky (born 1979), American baseball player
