= Tábor Zoo =

Tábor Zoological Garden
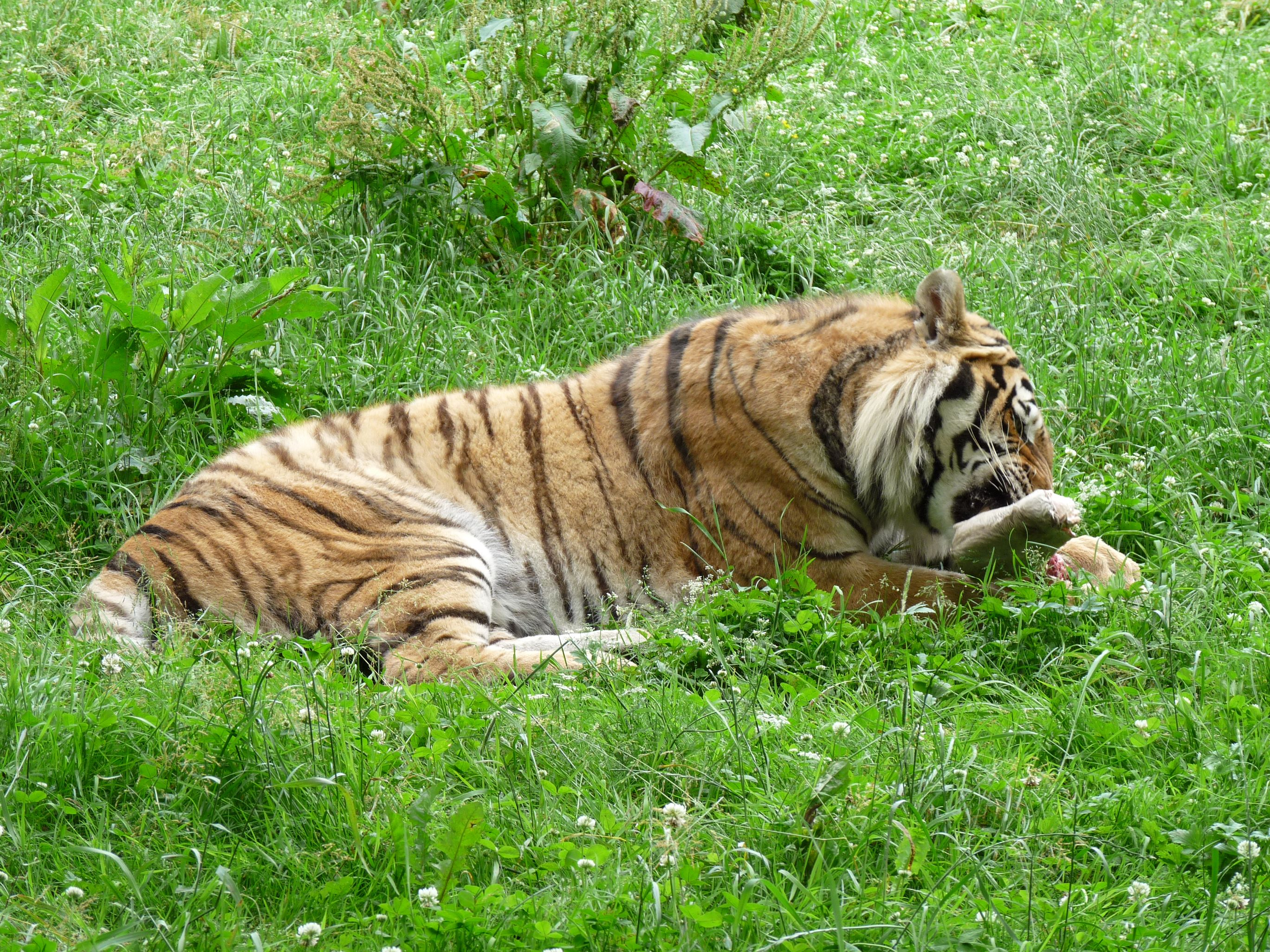
- Interactive map of Tábor Zoological Garden
- 49.38826°N 14.64898°E
- Date opened: 30 June 2015
- Location: Tábor-Větrovy, Czech Republic
- Land area: 10 ha (25 acres)
- No. of animals: 500
- No. of species: 80
- Memberships: ISIS
- Major exhibits: Lions, Tigers, Monkeys, Parrots, European bison
- Website: www.zootabor.eu

Tábor Zoo (Czech: Zoologická zahrada Tábor) is a zoological garden in the south-east of the town of Tábor, in the South Bohemian Region of the Czech Republic, founded in May 2015. At 10 hectares, it is the largest zoo in the South Bohemian Region. The zoo focuses on the protection of endangered species. The managing director of Tábor Zoo is Evžen Korec, owner and director of residential development company EKOSPOL, one of the zoo's sponsors.

== History ==
A previous organization called Zoologická zahrada Tábor-Větrovy (Zoological Garden Tábor-Větrovy) was founded in July 2011, but was shut down amid financial problems in spring 2015. The zoo continued as Zoologická zahrada Tábor a. s. (Zoological Garden Tábor Inc.) but as a new company, owned by Evžen Korec. The zoo reopened on 30 June 2015. The zoo had 25,000 visitors in the first month after it reopened, and more than 70,000 visitors in 2016. The number of visitors increased to 111,000 in 2023.

Korec later wrote a book about his take-over of Tábor Zoo, Jak jsem zachránil ZOO v Táboře (How I Rescued Tábor Zoo), co-written with Filip Susanka and released in December 2016.

== Endangered animal species ==
Tábor Zoo is focused on the protection of endangered species. The zoo's collection currently consists of over 500 animals from 80 species, of which about one quarter are from species classified according to the CITES Convention as endangered, including the Siberian tiger, American black bear, Brown bear, Arctic wolf, Great grey owl, Snowy owl, Eurasian eagle-owl, Fossa and White cape lion.

== Wisent (European Bison) reintroduction ==
In 2016, the zoo began breeding European bison, as part of a Europe-wide effort to reintroduce the species to the wild. Between February and May 2016, a new pen was built with an area of about 0.5 hectares. The zoo decided to breed the genetically most valuable line, known as the Lowland line, which is considered more suitable for reintroduction. They acquired two cows from Nuremberg Zoo (Norisa and Norma), and two cows (Usjana and Uselina) from Usedom Island Nature Park in Germany. All four cows were transported to the zoo in May 2016. The breeding bull, Poczekaj, arrived at the zoo in November 2016 from Niepołomice in Poland.

== Scientific research ==
Tábor Zoo hosts a scientific research group focused predominantly on the genetic study of three mammal species: Cane Corso dogs, European bison and American bison. The group has published several research articles, with results describing the inheritance of various traits in dogs, such as the inheritance of coat colour in Cane Corso dogs. Their present research is focused on the genetic background of longevity in the three species, and they have described the relationship between coat colour and longevity in Cane Corso dogs.

== Gallery ==
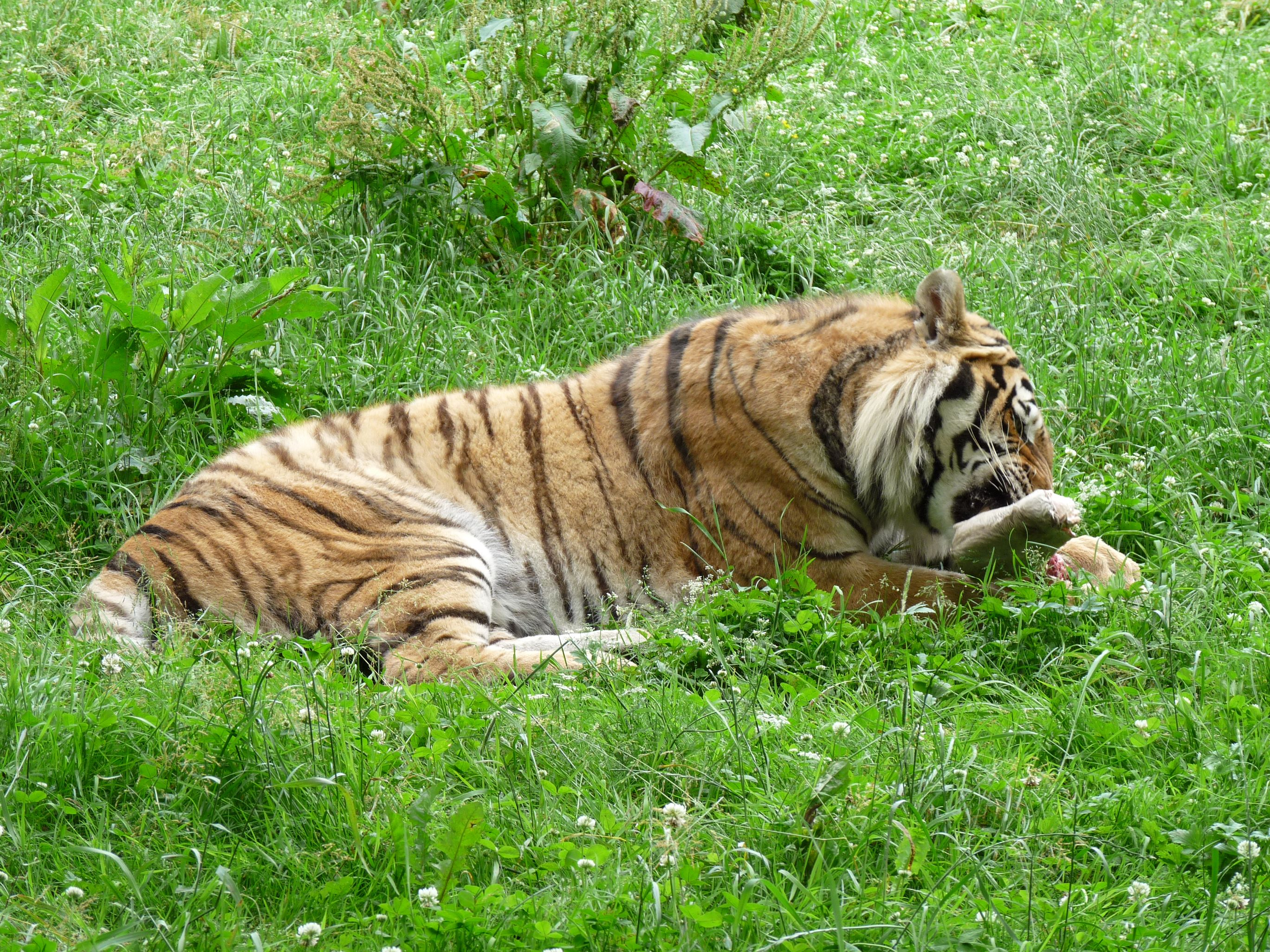
Tigers

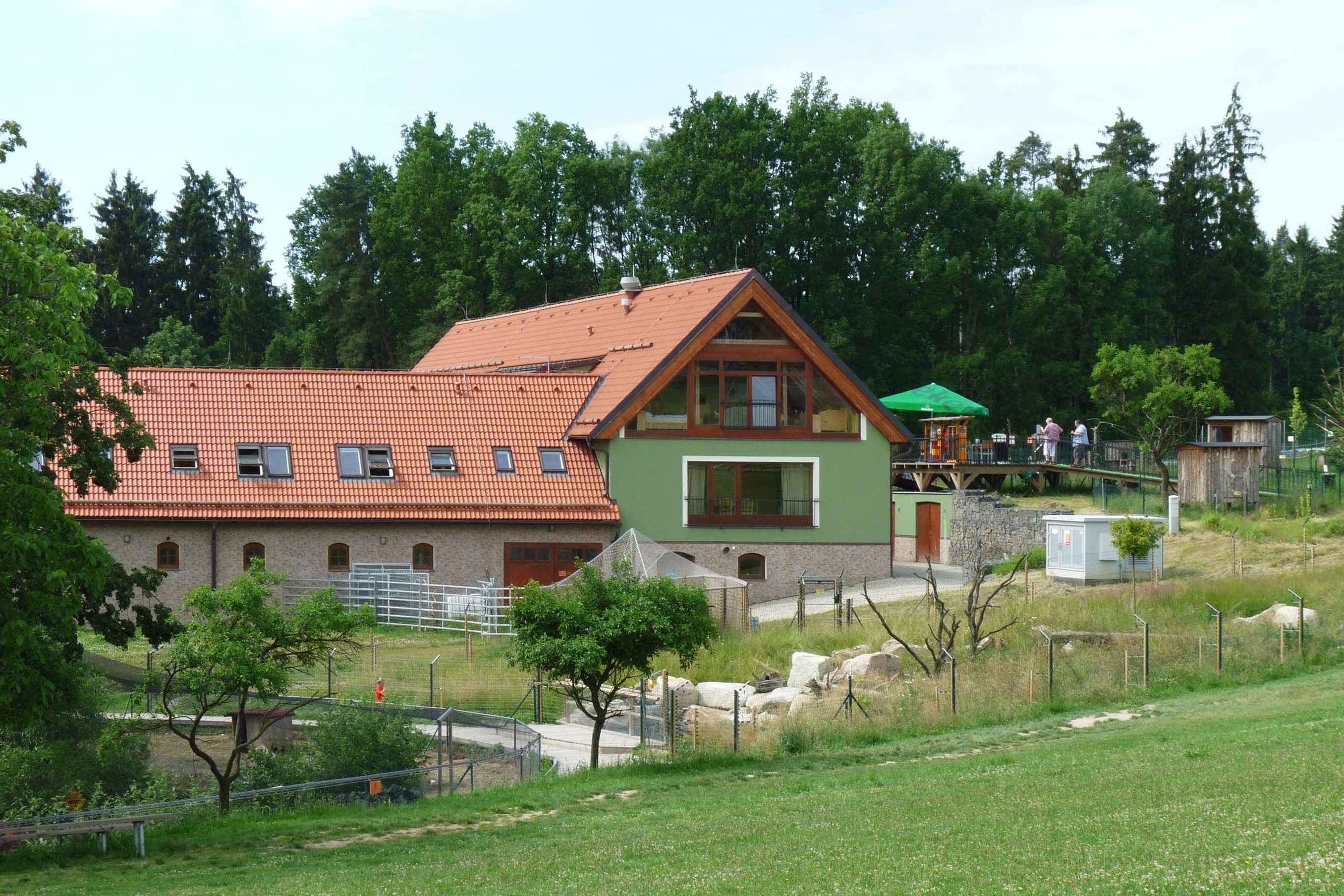
Service building

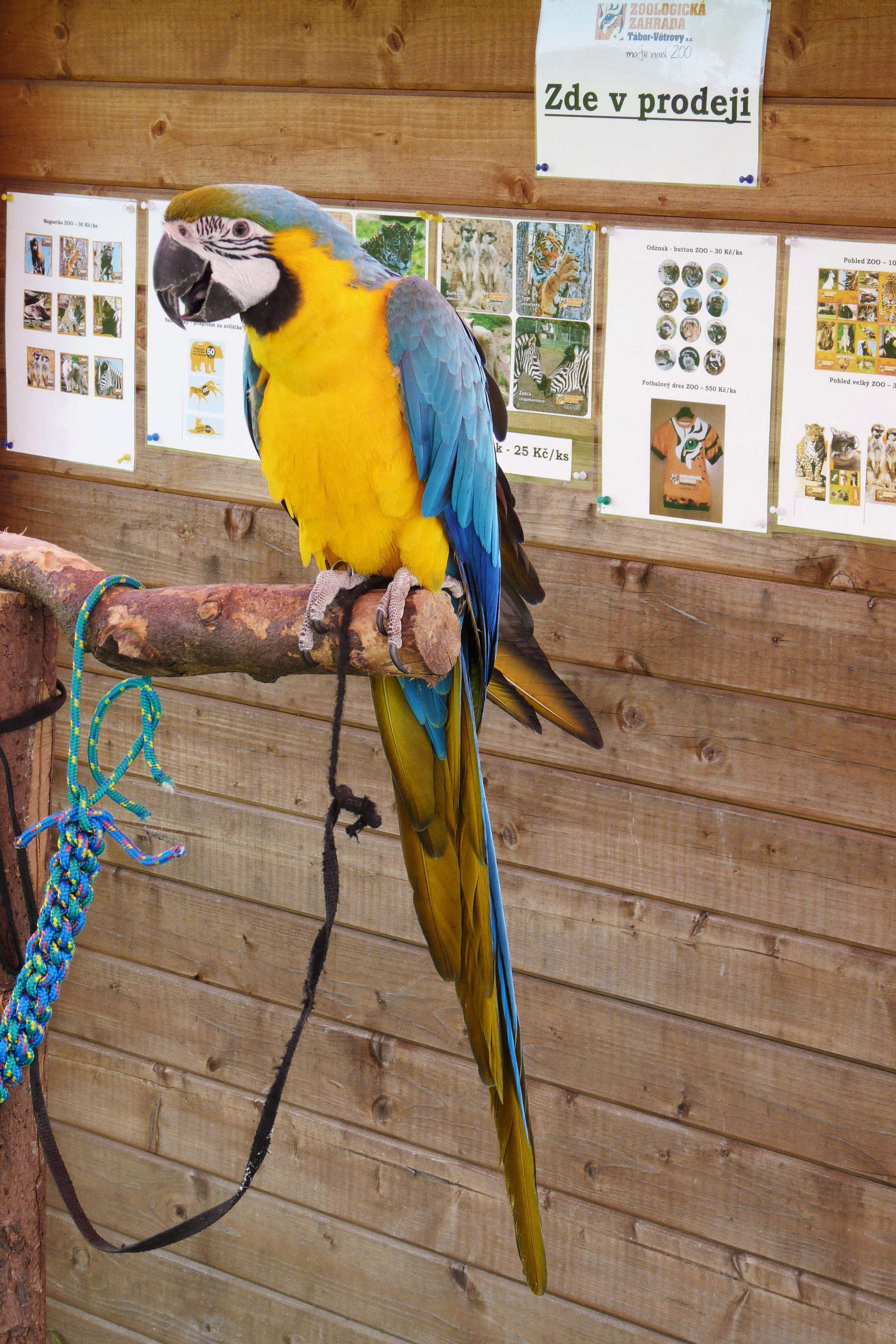
Ara ararauna

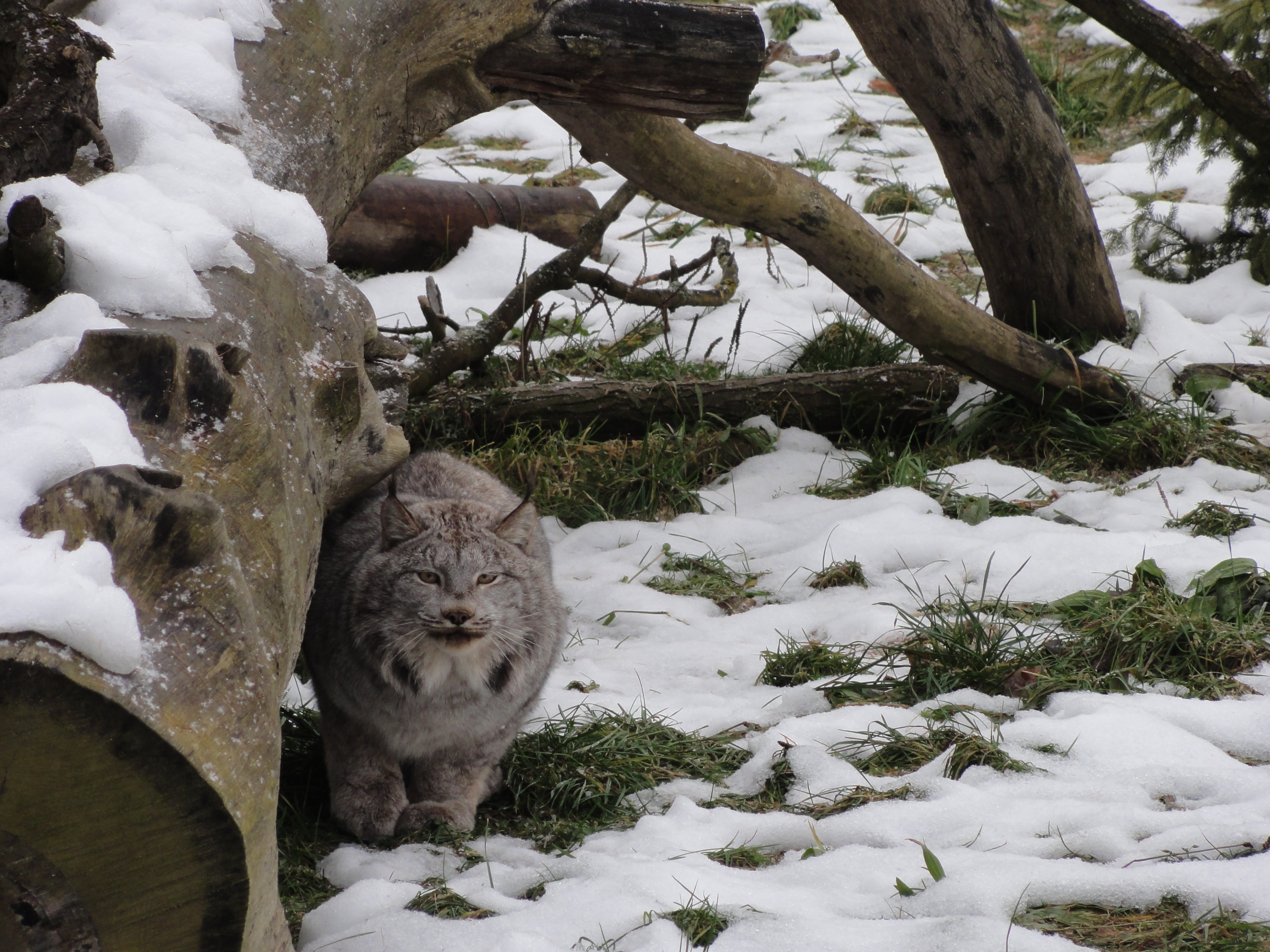
Lynx in Zoo Tábor

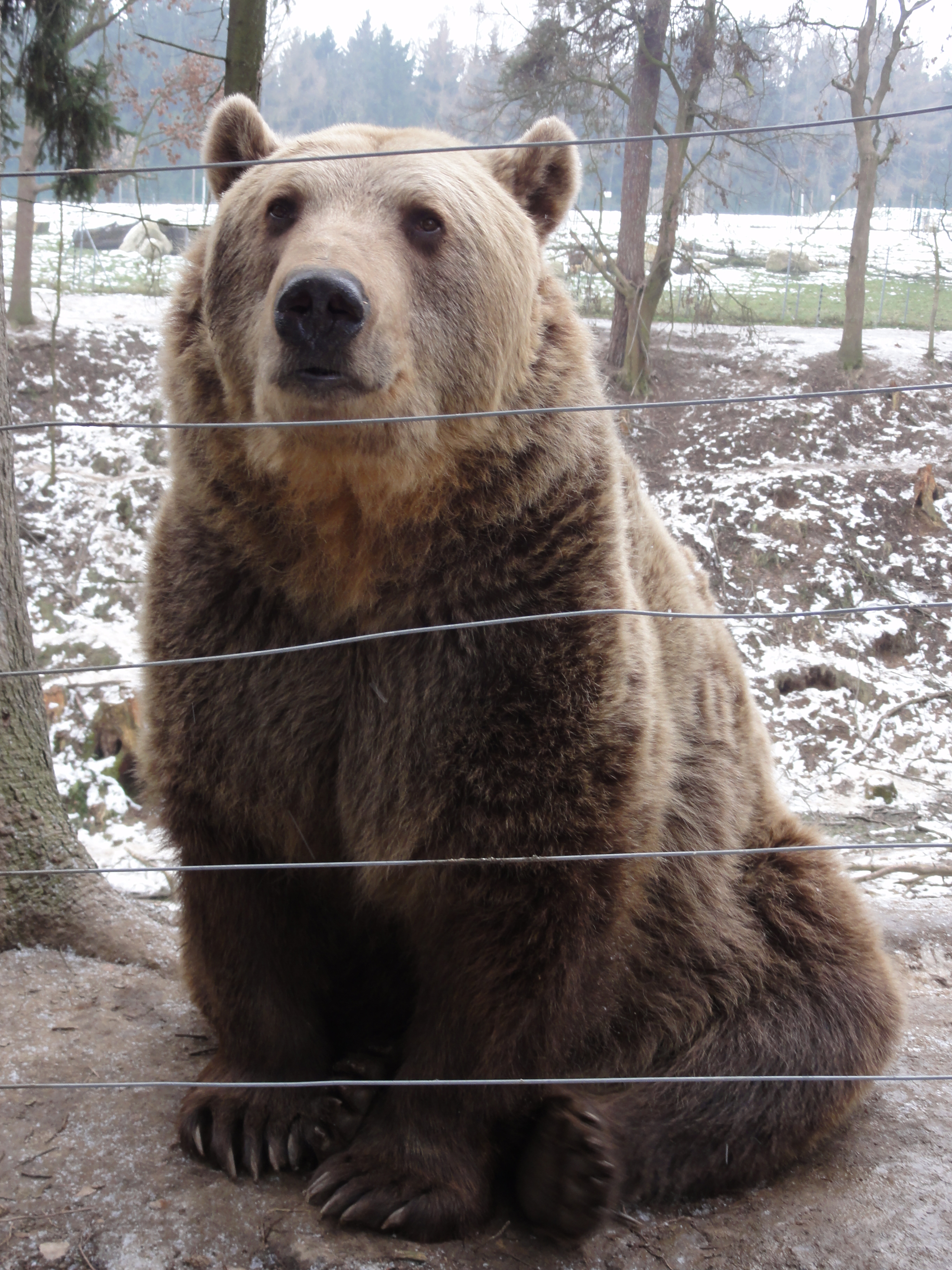
Bear in Zoo Tábor
