= Johan Peter Wotapek von Ritterwald =

Czech judge (1676–1763)

Johan Peter Wotapek von Ritterwald (Czech: Jan Petr Votápek z Ritterwaldu) (1676 – 1763 in Tábor) was a judge in Tábor in southern Bohemia. He was ennobled in November 1763 by Maria Theresa of Austria.
