= The Golden Passport =

Book by Duff McDonald

- First edition
- Author: Duff McDonald
- Subject: History of education
- Published: 2017 (Harper Business)
- Pages: 688
- ISBN: 978-0-06-234717-6 (Hardcover)

The Golden Passport: Harvard Business School, the Limits of Capitalism, and the Moral Failure of the MBA Elite is a 2017 history of the Harvard Business School and its influence, written by Duff McDonald and published by Harper Business.
