= Evžen Korec =

Czech entrepreneur (born 1956)

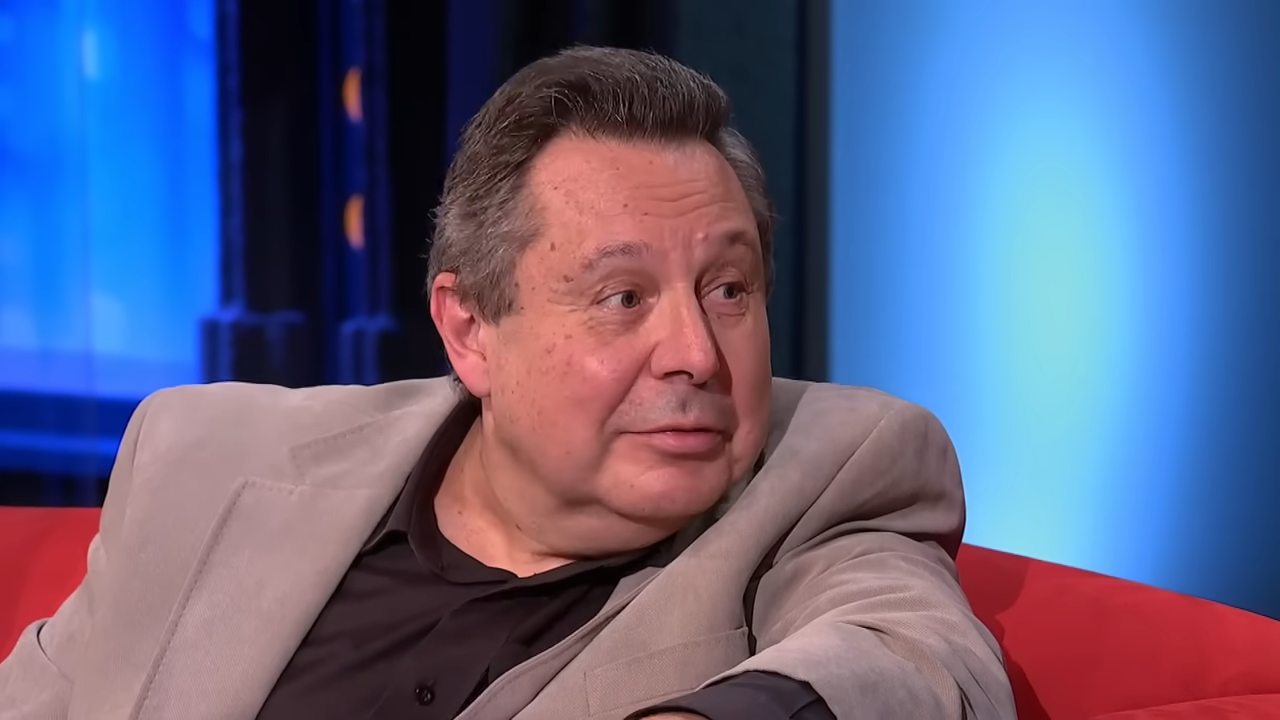
Evžen Korec in November 2024

Evžen Korec (born 16 September 1956) is a Czech scientist, entrepreneur and businessman. He is the owner and CEO of real estate development company EKOSPOL and Tábor Zoo. He is the co-author of 11 patents and more than 20 research papers published in international scientific journals. Korec has also written six books.

== Education and scientific career ==
Korec graduated from the Faculty of Science at Charles University in 1981, with a degree in molecular biology and genetics. His master's thesis was titled, "Analysis of Susceptibility and Resistance to Rous Sarcoma Virus in Inbred Line of Minor Poultry." Between 1983 and 1986, he worked as a researcher at the Institute of Molecular Genetics at the Czechoslovak Academy of Sciences, where he received a Ph.D. in Oncology. His Ph.D. research involved investigating the expression of avian sarcoma virus antigens.

== Business career ==
In 1992, he founded the real estate development company EKOSPOL and remains its CEO and chairman. EKOSPOL is one of the largest residential developers in the Czech Republic by market share of apartment sales.

Korec regularly lectures at the Prague University of Economics and Business and frequently comments on residential development, construction, housing, and the mortgage market in Czech media. According to a 2012 analysis by Newton Media, Evžen Korec and EKOSPOL had a significant media presence in the Czech development industry, with Korec's media mentions increasing by 216% year-over-year and EKOSPOL receiving nearly three times the coverage of its major competitors.

=== Korec's rule ===
As the CEO of EKOSPOL development company, Korec formulated Korec's rule, which says: "The final sales price of an apartment with the area of up to 50 m^{2} must correspond to a maximum of 20 times the annual rent in a given location. For larger apartments (large bedroom apartments, two-bedroom apartments, etc.) the sales price should be on the level of a maximum of 25 to 30 times the annual rent."

== Animal protection ==
Korec is also involved in animal protection and preservation. Korec purchased Tábor Zoo in 2015 after its shutdown. Later that year, the zoo re-opened to the public, with a focus on the protection of endangered animals. Korec breeds a variety of animals, including koi carp and horses. He is the owner of the Korec Corso kennel.

== Scientific research ==
Korec leads a scientific group in Tábor Zoo focused on the genetics of two animal models – dogs and bison. His group determined the average lifespan of Cane Corso dogs through a study of a statistically significant group in cooperation with 72 Cane Corso kennels from 25 countries. The research aims to extend the lifespan of Cane Corso dogs. In this publication, the relationship between average lifespan and coat color was described in mammals for the first time. The research results were published in the Open Veterinary Journal. He has also researched the inheritance of coat colour in the Cane Corso Italiano breed, describing the segregation ratio of coat colour in offspring in relation to that of the parents. The study proposes that at least one gene responsible for coat colouring is located on the sex chromosome. The findings are intended to help breeders predict various traits of the litter.

== Personal life ==
Korec is married to Jana, and they have one son.
