= Charlie and the Chocolate Factory (disambiguation) =

Charlie and the Chocolate Factory is a 1964 children's novel by Roald Dahl.

Charlie and the Chocolate Factory may also refer to:

== Video games ==
- Charlie and the Chocolate Factory (1985 video game), a ZX Spectrum game based on the book
- Charlie and the Chocolate Factory (2005 video game), a video game based on the film

== Other uses ==
- Charlie and the Chocolate Factory (franchise), a media franchise
- Charlie and the Chocolate Factory (film), a 2005 film adaptation of the book
  - Charlie and the Chocolate Factory (soundtrack), a 2005 soundtrack album for the film
- Charlie and the Chocolate Factory (musical), a 2013 stage musical adaptation of the book
- Charlie and the Chocolate Factory: The Ride, an attraction at Alton Towers theme park, UK

== See also ==
- Willy Wonka and the Chocolate Factory (disambiguation)
- Willy Wonka (disambiguation)
