= Pavel Wonka =

Czech dissident

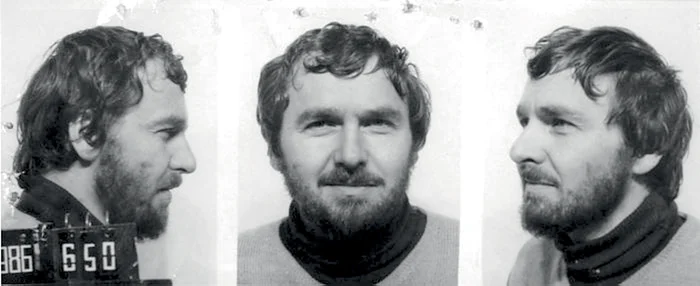
- Photographs from Wonka's prison file (1988)
- Born: 21 January 1953; Vrchlabí, Czechoslovakia
- Died: 24 April 1988 (aged 35); Hradec Králové, Czechoslovakia
- Known for: Last political prisoner to die in a communist prison in the Czechoslovak Socialist Republic
- Awards: Medal of Merit

Pavel Wonka (21 January 1953 – 24 April 1988) was a Czech liberal political activist, dissident, human rights activist and anti-communist. He was the last political prisoner to die in a communist prison in the Czechoslovak Socialist Republic.

== Life ==
He was born in Vrchlabí to a family of mixed Czech and German origin; a liberal supporter of parliamentary democracy, he became involved in the resistance against the communist regime of Czechoslovakia. As a result he was arrested for his liberal views, brutally beaten, starved, tortured and interrogated by the communist secret police. He was initially released because of bad health, but the judge, Marcela Horváthová, sent him back to prison in Hradec Králové for another five months. There he died due to a lack of medical care. He was the last Czechoslovak political prisoner who died while imprisoned; after the fall of communism the persecution of Wonka was deemed a human rights violation by the regime.

On 28 October 2013, he was posthumously awarded the Medal of Merit.
