= Roald Dahl revision controversy =

Controversy over books by Roald Dahl

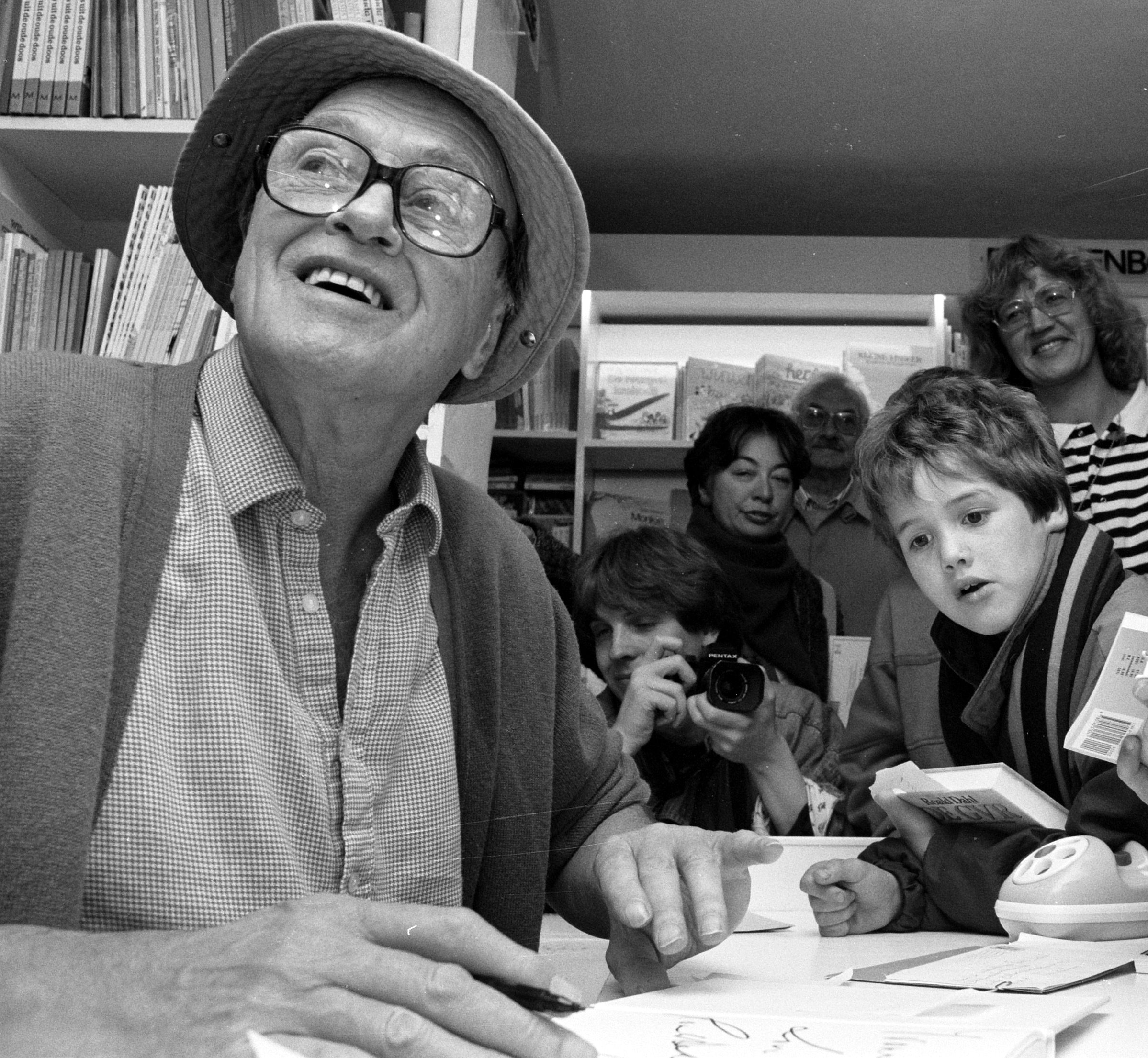
Works by Roald Dahl (author pictured in 1988) were expurgated in 2023.

In 2023, Puffin Books, the children's imprint of the British publisher Penguin Books, expurgated various works by British author Roald Dahl, causing controversy.

During his lifetime, Dahl had urged his publishers not to "so much as change a single comma in one of [his] books". On 19 February 2023 Puffin Books announced it had hired sensitivity readers over the span of three years to assess Dahl's works, rereleasing his work with multiple changes regarding Dahl's depiction of race, sex and character. A report from British newspaper The Telegraph determined that Puffin Books altered hundreds of passages in Dahl's work, including in Charlie and the Chocolate Factory, Matilda, James and the Giant Peach, Fantastic Mr Fox and The Witches. Facing backlash from readers and authors, on 23 February Puffin Books announced that Dahl's original publications would be released alongside the expurgated versions as "The Roald Dahl Classic Collection", but did not retract the revisions.

Various authors, politicians, and organisations have commented on the controversy. It was later announced that the works of Enid Blyton (author of The Famous Five) and Ian Fleming (author of James Bond) would be expurgated as well, and it was reported that R. L. Stine's Goosebumps had already been expurgated without the author's knowledge.

== Background ==
Roald Dahl was a British author of children's literature. Dahl's works are published by Puffin Books, the children's imprint of the British publisher Penguin Books, while the rights to his works are managed by the Roald Dahl Story Company. In September 2021, streaming service Netflix acquired the Roald Dahl Story Company.

Dahl's comments and writing have received criticism. In the August 1983 issue of the Literary Review, a review by Dahl of Tony Clifton's God Cried appears, in which he writes that the United States is "so utterly dominated by the great Jewish financial institutions" and asks, "must Israel, like Germany, be brought to her knees before she learns how to behave in this world?" In a 1990 interview with The Independent, Dahl said that he had become antisemitic, "in as much as that you get a Jewish person in another country like England strongly supporting Zionism".

Characters in Dahl's works have been criticised for perceived racist and sexist stereotypes. In 1972, children's book author Eleanor Cameron compared the Oompa-Loompas in Charlie and the Chocolate Factory to African slaves in an article for The Horn Book Magazine. These statements were echoed further following Dahl's death in 1990, with book critic Michael Dirda accusing Charlie and the Chocolate Factory and The Witches of racism and misogyny, respectively, in an article for The Washington Post. In the Jewish-American and feminist publication Lilith, Michele Landsberg argued that "evil, domineering, smelly, fat, ugly women are [Dahl's] favorite villains". Dahl's short story collection Switch Bitch was criticised for its crude and disturbing themes. In 1973, Dahl rewrote Oompa-Loompas, making them white in skin colour. In 2020, Dahl's family apologised for his antisemitic comments.

== Revisions ==
On 19 February 2023, Puffin Books announced that it would be altering the language used in many of Dahl's books to expurgate what they deemed derogatory words and passages. The process took approximately three years, and was conducted in association with Inclusive Minds, a collective that promotes accessibility and inclusivity. A report from British newspaper The Telegraph found hundreds of removed or altered words and passages.

Some changes focused on race and ethnicity. Numerous changes were made to the use of colour descriptions, whether in reference to skin colour (a character having a face "white with horror", becoming "agog with horror") or otherwise (a person saying something "darkly", which is changed to "mysteriously").

References to other countries, regions, and ethnicities were sometimes removed or significantly altered, as were references to cultural practices, culturally-tied words, and indigenous lifestyles. For example, a character "hopping about like a dervish" in Fantastic Mr Fox became "like a frog".

Other changes focused on sex and gender. The word queer (in the sense of "strange") was regularly removed, and most references to "men and women", "boys and girls", "mothers and fathers", and similar were replaced with equivalent gender-neutral words and phrases such as "parents" or "siblings". Similarly, masculine pronouns were changed in certain general circumstances, such as the plan in The Witches to catch "the catspringer in his burrow" becoming "its burrow". In some cases, references to gender were changed, including changing the character of "Small Fox" in Fantastic Mr Fox from male to female.

References to roles traditionally associated with men or women were often altered, and some insults directed at women were often softened (such as "ugly old cow" becoming "ghastly old shrew" in The Twits). The stereotype of female shrillness was sometimes obscured. References to behavioural differences between men and women were also removed or altered, including the removal of some dialogue in The BFG about girls' and boys' dreams ("If I is giving a girl's dream to a boy, even if it was a really whoppsy girl's dream, the boy would be waking up and thinking what a rotbungling grinksludging old dream that was.")

Other changes focused on appearance and disabilities. Many references to people, especially women, being physically attractive or unattractive were removed. The word fat was regularly removed, being replaced with terms such as enormous or large, as were references to short height and similar descriptions. References to characters being old was sometimes altered or removed.

The words crazy and mad, along with similar words, were regularly removed, as were some descriptions of low intelligence and mental disorders, such as removing a line from Charlie and the Chocolate Factory about a character being "shut up in some disgusting sanatorium". References to physical deformity or disability, including deafness, were also commonly removed or altered.

References to lack of privilege were sometimes altered, such as removing a description of Sophie as "a little orphan of no real importance in the world" from The BFG.

References to poor personal hygiene were often removed, while some references to drinking alcohol and smoking were also changed. In Fantastic Mr Fox, Small Fox sniffs a bottle of cider rather than taking a sip, and Charlie and the Chocolate Factory's Oompa Loompas are no longer described as "drunk as lords" on butterscotch and soda.

Other changes focused on violence. Comic references to violence were sometimes removed, and references to corporal punishment were changed. Mentions of deadly weapons such as guns and knives were often removed.

References to slaves and prisoners were removed, as were certain references to death.

Other changes focused on words that in British English usage have taken on more vulgar associations, such as horny and fanny.

Some changes removed whole lines or passages, while others replaced them with entirely new text. The centipede's songs in James and the Giant Peach that contrasted the "tremendously flabby" Aunt Sponge with the "thin as a wire" Aunt Spiker were changed to a more general lyrics about both characters being "nasty" and "frightful". Willy Wonka's anecdote about having tried Hair Toffee on an Oompa-Loompa in the Testing Room ("and immediately a huge black beard started shooting out of his chin") was changed to Wonka testing the sweet personally.

=== Editions ===
Following the announcement, e-book copies of Dahl's works were automatically updated.

Dahl's publishers in the United States, France, and the Netherlands announced they had declined to incorporate the changes altogether.

On 23 February, Puffin Books announced The Roald Dahl Classic Collection, consisting of Dahl's original texts. The expurgated versions will continue to be sold.

== Reactions ==
=== Readers ===
Many readers and fans expressed outrage at the idea that an author's words would be changed after death, or dismay at revisions. Puffin Books announced a few days later that it had "listened to the debate" and would continue to publish the older versions of the books alongside the revised editions.

=== Authors ===
The revisions were met with sharp criticism from numerous authors and literary groups. British-American novelist Salman Rushdie criticised the rewrites in a tweet, writing, "Roald Dahl was no angel but this is absurd censorship. Puffin Books and the Dahl estate should be ashamed." Suzanne Nossel, the CEO of PEN America, spoke on behalf of the organisation to condemn Puffin Books' changes. In an interview with Newsnight, author Margaret Atwood said concerning the revisions: "Good luck with Roald Dahl. You're just really going to have to replace the whole book if you want things to be nice. But this started a long time ago; it was the Disneyfication of fairy tales. What do I think of it? I'm with Chaucer, who said, 'If you don't like this tale, turn over the page and read something else.'" Author Christopher Paolini wrote in a tweet, "This is wrong. Ban a book if you must. Or put a content warning at the front. But don't rewrite it. Don't put words in an author's mouth (especially one who has no say in the matter)."

In contrast, author Joanne Harris supported the revisions in a tweet, saying: 'Publishers updating a book - with the approval of the author's estate - to ensure its saleability is not censorship. It's just business.' English writer Philip Pullman suggested that Dahl's work should fade away in favour of authors such as Malorie Blackman, Michael Morpurgo, or Beverley Naidoo. At Writer's Digest, author and translator Diego Jourdan Pereira compared the situation to similar revisions of books in earlier decades, such as The Purple Smurfs and Tintin in the Congo, saying that classic children's books will always be modified or withdrawn from sale to reflect modern sensibilities. British poet Kate Clanchy, whose own work has been edited by sensitivity readers, said that "We've always updated children's books. It's a tribute to the way that these books are becoming myths... that we've adjusted them again."

=== Politicians and government ===
The then Prime Minister, Rishi Sunak, referenced The BFG in his response to the books' publication, saying that Puffin "shouldn't gobblefunk around with words." Former Prime Minister Boris Johnson said that although people "should be vigilant about freedom of speech", the publisher's decision was not comparable with "authoritarian systems where journalists are shot", and he observed that nobody would be stopped from reciting the original version of a poem that Puffin had edited.

Kemi Badenoch, the Minister for Women and Equalities at the time, spoke publicly on the matter, saying, "If you change everything old to look new, then people don't know what things used to be like, which means that you lose the institutional memory, you lose the collective memory," adding, "But changing the words that someone wrote, I don't think is right."

Queen Camilla was reportedly "shocked and dismayed" upon hearing about the revisions, and publicly denounced them.

=== Other contemporary reactions ===
Several journalists have written op-eds on the controversy. The Atlantic's Helen Lewis used Dahl's novel My Uncle Oswald—known for its vulgarity, sexism, and themes of eugenics—to state that grotesque description of people is rooted within Dahl's work, and as such cannot be omitted, describing the revisions as "corporate safetyism". In a differing opinion, Matthew Walther of The Lamp viewed the controversy as insignificant, comparing the release of the collection to New Coke and Coca-Cola Classic.

English comedian Ricky Gervais poked fun at the changes in a tweet. The revisions were also criticised by actors Brian Cox and Whoopi Goldberg.

Michael Böllner, the former child actor who played Augustus Gloop in Willy Wonka & the Chocolate Factory, has criticized the revision of Charlie and the Chocolate Factory, where descriptions of his character as being "fat" were removed.

== Legacy ==
On 26 February 2023, seven days after the original announcement by Puffin Books, Ian Fleming Publications announced that Ian Fleming's James Bond series would receive several revisions, including removing racial slurs and a racist depiction of African Americans in Live and Let Die, following a review from sensitivity reviewers.

It was reported that following the Dahl edits, author R. L. Stine was reworking the text of some of his Goosebumps books. Stine denied this, saying that "The stories aren't true. I've never changed a word in Goosebumps. Any changes were never shown to me." The publisher Scholastic clarified in a statement that some edits had been made to ebook reissues of the series in 2018, saying that they had "reviewed the text to keep the language current and avoid imagery that could negatively impact a young person's view of themselves today, with a particular focus on mental health".

A month later, it was announced Enid Blyton's works would be expurgated as well. In that same month, P. G. Wodehouse's books were revised to remove "unacceptable" terms such as a reference to minstrelsy.

== See also ==
- Book censorship
- Culture war
- Political correctness
