= Paris Themmen =

American actor (born 1959)

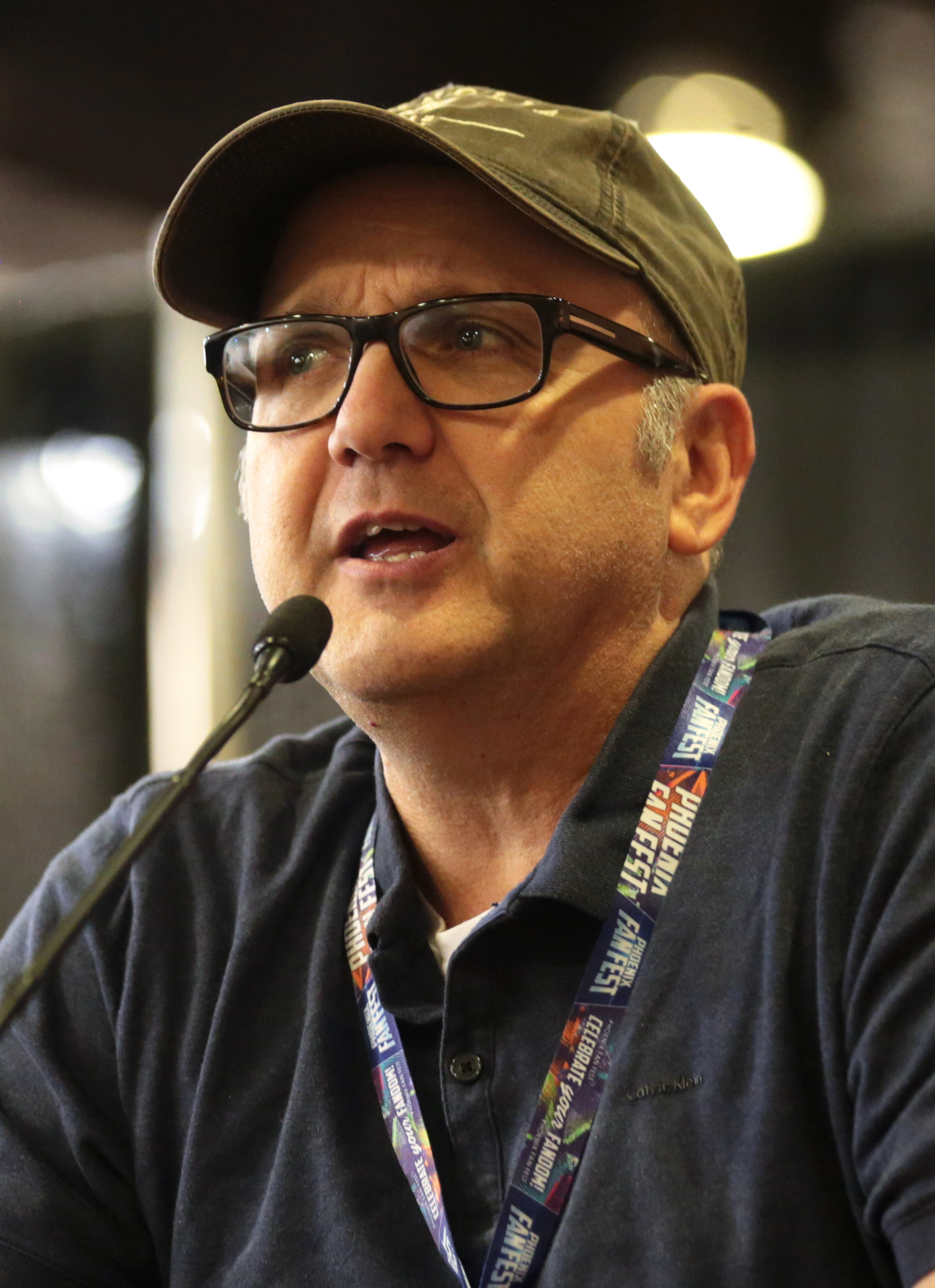
- Themmen in 2017
- Born: June 25, 1959 (age 67); Boston, Massachusetts, U.S.
- Occupations: Actor; businessman; real estate broker; casting director
- Years active: 1967–present
- Known for: Mike Teavee in Willy Wonka & the Chocolate Factory
- Spouse: Nikki Grillos (m. 2014)
- Parent: Ivana Marburger Themmen (mother)
- Relatives: Susan Blu (sister-in-law)
- Website: paristhemmen.com

Paris Themmen (born June 25, 1959) is an American actor who started his career as a child actor. He is best known for his role as Mike Teavee in Willy Wonka & the Chocolate Factory. After leaving acting, he worked in business as a real estate broker and casting director.

== Early life ==
Themmen was born on June 25, 1959, in Boston, Massachusetts, to Ivana Marburger Themmen and Harold B. Themmen, both classical musicians. Themmen's mother was a composer for orchestras in the late 20th century. A guitar concerto of hers was in final contention for the 1982 Kennedy Center Friedheim Award. Themmen's father, a graduate of the New England Conservatory of Music, was a clarinetist and librarian for the American Ballet Theatre, and also played for the Boston Pops Orchestra.

== Career ==
=== Child actor ===
Themmen appeared in radio and TV commercials, voice-overs and theater performing on Broadway in Mame with Ann Miller in 1967 and in The Rothschilds in 1970. In 1971, aged 11, he got his breakthrough role in Willy Wonka and the Chocolate Factory as Mike Teevee.

=== Business careers ===
Declaring a hiatus from acting at age 14 to "just be a kid," Themmen went on to receive a B.F.A. in theatre from New York University. He founded Access International, a travel service that arranged Europe-bound charter flights for backpackers.

Following brief stints in real estate, film production, commercial casting, business representation at Walt Disney Imagineering, and a few other ventures, he now signs autographs at movie conventions, runs a photography business, and makes sporadic appearances in commercials, plays and TV shows.

=== Film appearance ===
Themmen's adult acting appearances include "Virtuoso", a 2000, sixth-season episode of the TV series Star Trek: Voyager, as a fawning fan. He was billed as a "former child star" in two 2008 episodes of the American game show Duel.

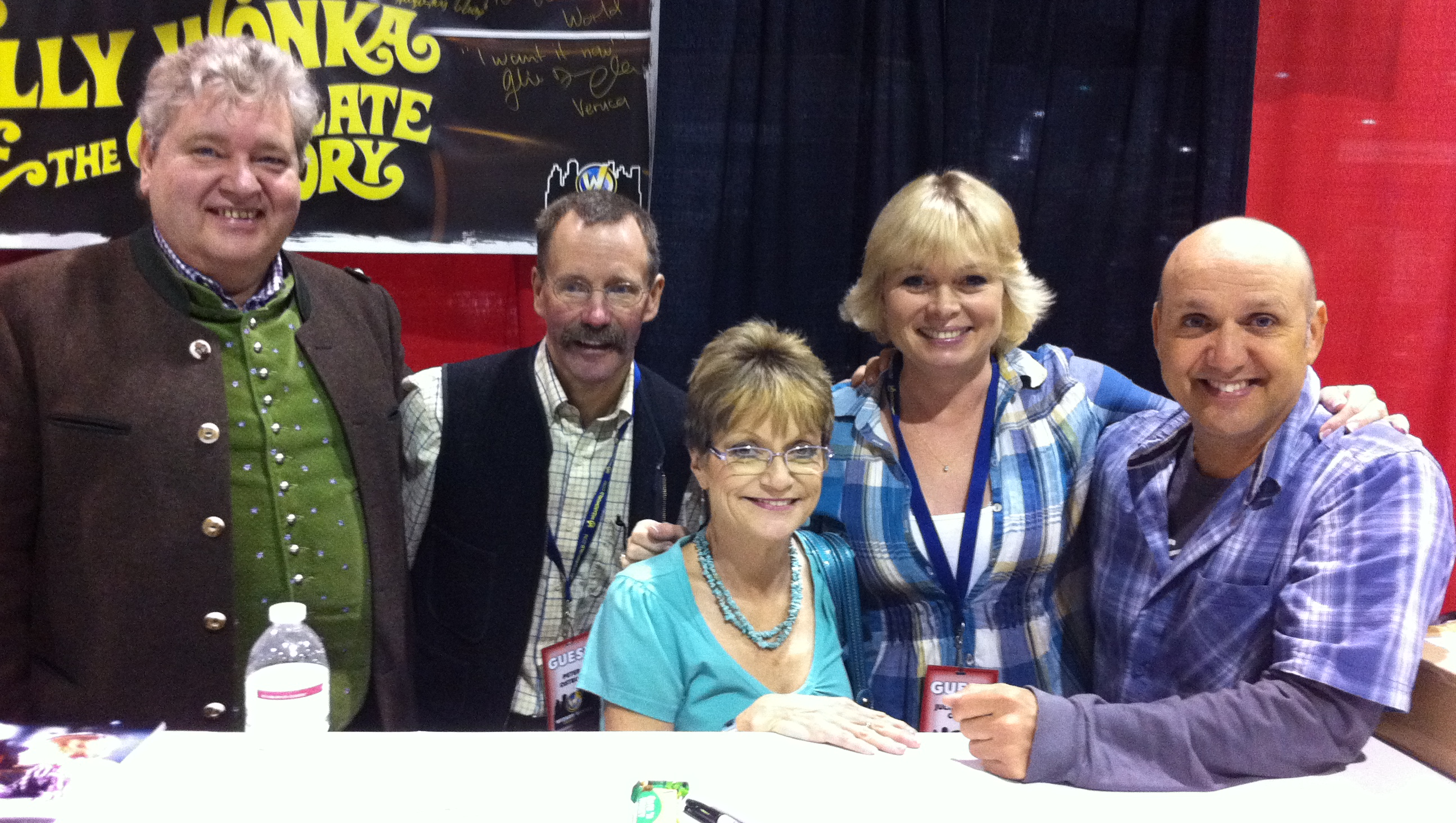
Themmen (far right) in 2011 with the Willy Wonka child cast

On May 4, 2011, Themmen appeared on the British television morning show Daybreak, alongside the other child actors from Willy Wonka & the Chocolate Factory: Peter Ostrum (Charlie Bucket), Julie Dawn Cole (Veruca Salt), Denise Nickerson (Violet Beauregarde) and Michael Böllner (Augustus Gloop). They made an additional 40th Anniversary reunion appearance on NBC's Today Show eleven days later. He reunited with the partial Wonka cast again on the program in 2015.

On January 23, 2015, Themmen appeared on Ken Reid's TV Guidance Counselor Podcast. The episode was recorded live in Wilmington, Massachusetts during North East ComicCon.

Themmen was a Jeopardy! contestant on March 13, 2018, finishing in second place. His wife, Nikki Grillos, previously appeared on the program in 2015, returning twice as a champion before being defeated on her third appearance.

== Personal life ==
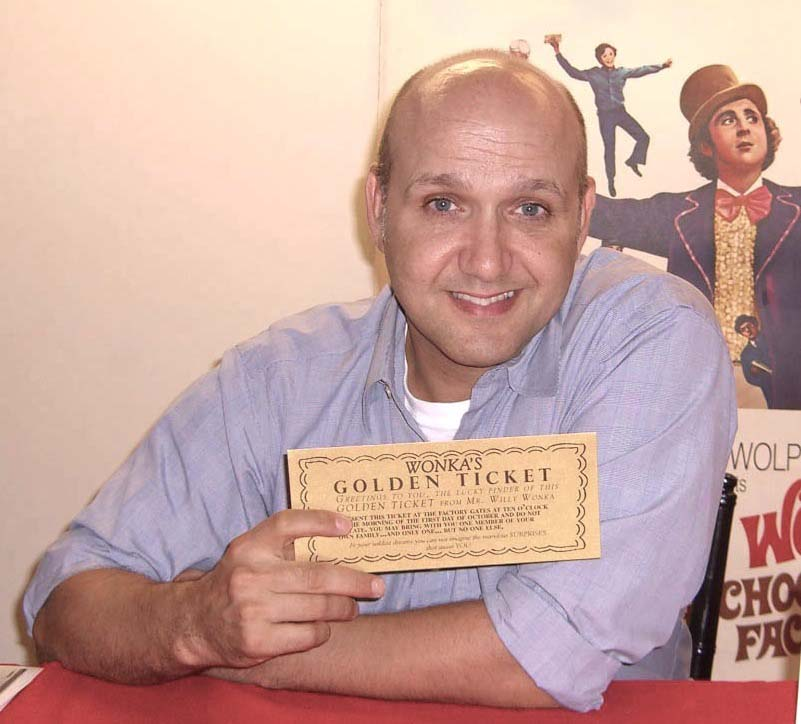
Themmen in 2010

Themmen has been married to Nikki Grillos since 2014. Together, the couple currently reside in Los Angeles, California.

Themmen's sister Allegra Themmen-Pigott (1967–2019) was a coloratura soprano opera singer and music therapist. His sister Tania Themmen is married to voice actress and voice director Susan Blu.

== Filmography ==
=== Film ===
Year	Title	Role	Notes
1971	Willy Wonka & the Chocolate Factory	Mike Teevee	

=== Television ===
Year	Title	Role	Notes
1975	The Rock 'n' Fun Magic Show	Himself	
1994	Macross Plus	Additional Voices	TV mini-series
1999	Screenplay	Mail Room Clerk	TV movie
2000	Star Trek: Voyager	Fawning Fan	Episode: Virtuoso
2003	After They Were Famous	Himself	Documentary
2011	Daybreak	Himself	1 episode
2011	Pure Imagination: The Story of 'Willy Wonka and the Chocolate Factory	Himself	Documentary
2011	Top Chef: Just Desserts	Himself	Episode: Pure Imagination
2011; 2015	Today	Himself	2 episodes
2012	Beyond the Marquee	Himself	Episode: Meet the Wonka Kids
2012	Men with No Lives	Himself	Episode: Who Is Hugh Jardon? Stan Lee's Comikaze Special
2016	Cake Wars	Himself	1 episode
2016	LeagueOne: In the Spotlight!	Himself	Episode: Child Star Remembers Gene Wilder!
2018	Jeopardy!	Himself	1 episode
2021	To Tell the Truth	Himself	1 episode

=== Film work ===
Year	Title	Role	Notes
1991	Until the End of the World	Production Assistant	Uncredited
2005	Citizen Candy Man: A Chocumentary	Special Thanks	
2011	Something Borrowed	Production Assistant	
2012	The Owner	First Assistant Director	

=== Theatre ===
Year	Title	Role	Notes
1967	Mame	Performer	
1970–1971	The Rothschilds	Young Jacob Rothschild	Broadway
