= Ivana Marburger Themmen =

American composer and pianist

Ivana Themmen
- Born: Ivana Marburger Themmen; April 7, 1935 (age 91); New York City, U.S.
- Occupations: Composer, pianist
- Spouse: Harold B. Themmen
- Children: 3, including Paris Themmen
- Relatives: Susan Blu (daughter-in-law)

Ivana Marburger Themmen (born April 7, 1935) is an American composer and pianist, whose Concerto for Guitar was a finalist in the 1982 Kennedy Center Friedheim Composition Competition.

== Career ==
Themmen was born on April 7, 1935, in New York City, where she began studying piano at age 7. She attended the New England Conservatory of Music, where she met and married Harold B. Themmen. They had three children, Paris, Allegra, and Tania. Tania is married to voice actress Susan Blu.

In addition to the New England Conservatory, Themmen studied in Europe, at the Eastman School of Music, and at the Tanglewood Music Center. Her teachers included Francis Judd Cooke, Nicolas Flagello, Lukas Foss, Carl McKinley, Jean Rosenblum, and Otto Schulhof. She corresponded with Eugene Ormandy.

Themmen taught at the Hampton Conservatory and also worked as an accompanist for the American Ballet Theatre. She has received grants from the New Jersey State Council on the Arts, Queens Symphony, and the New York State Council on the Arts.

Themmen belongs to the National Association of Composers, USA (NACUSA). Her music is published by Lyra Music Company. and Cor Publishing Company/Wiltshire Music.

== Discography ==
=== Chamber music ===
- Circles (flute, French horn and piano)
- Concept V (clarinet and viola)
- Concepts (two violas or clarinet and viola)
- Duets (flute and bass clarinet)
- Fanfares (three trumpets)
- For Two Trombones
- Green Willow: A Japanese Fairy Tale (narrator, chamber ensemble, and optional dancers)
- Little Etudes (three trumpets)
- Montages (harp)
- Music for Friends, Perhaps (piano, clarinet, violin, viola and cello)
- Piece (flute and piano)
- Quintet (flute, clarinet, horn, violin and cello)
- Sextet
- Sonata (cello and piano)
- Ten Cantos (two French horns)
- Tetrachiron (piano four hands)
- Wind Game (saxophone quartet)

=== Opera ===
- Lucian (libretto by Norman Simon)

=== Orchestra ===
- Concerto for Guitar
- Concerto for Trombone
- Cupid & Psyche (violin and orchestra)
- Fasching
- Triptych

=== Vocal ===
- Magnificat (chorus and orchestra)
- Mystic Trumpeter (song cycle; text by Walt Whitman)
- "Ode to Akhmatova" (medium voice and piano; text by Anna Andreevna Akhmatova)
- Requiem (chorus and orchestra)
- Shelter this Candle from the Wind (soprano and orchestra; text by Edna St. Vincent Millay)
