= List of Charlie and the Chocolate Factory characters =

Cast of franchise inspired by Roald Dahl

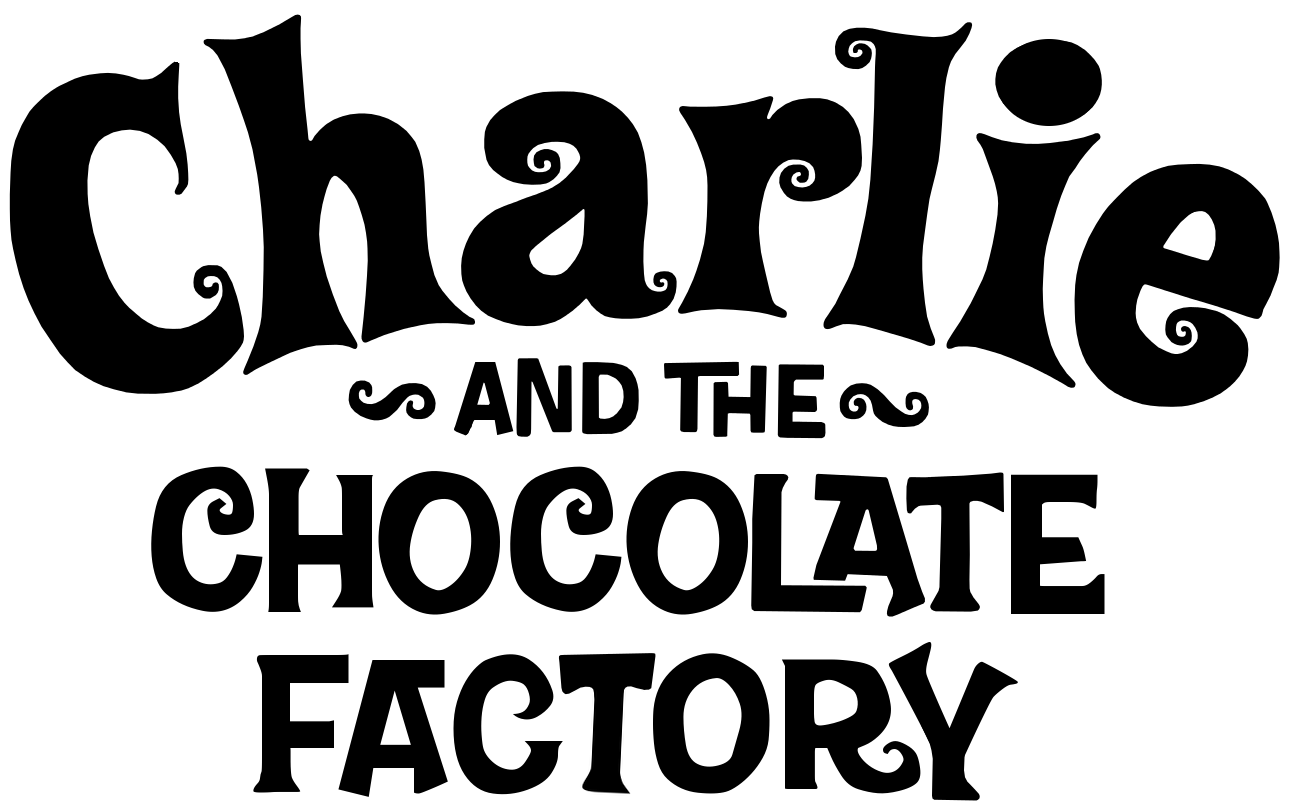
The logo for the 2005 film Charlie and the Chocolate Factory

This is a list of characters in the 1964 Roald Dahl book Charlie and the Chocolate Factory, his 1972 sequel book Charlie and the Great Glass Elevator, and the former's film adaptations, Willy Wonka & the Chocolate Factory (1971), Charlie and the Chocolate Factory (2005), and Tom and Jerry: Willy Wonka and the Chocolate Factory (2017), as well as the prequel film to the film Willy Wonka & the Chocolate Factory, Wonka (2023). Listings include actors who have played the characters in various media.

== Main characters ==
=== Willy Wonka ===
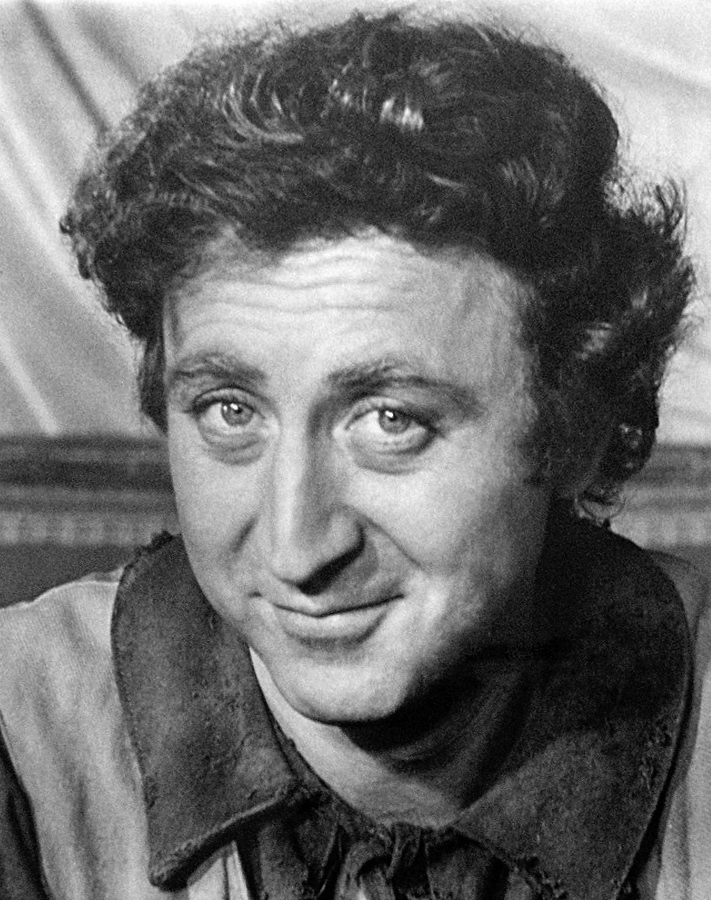
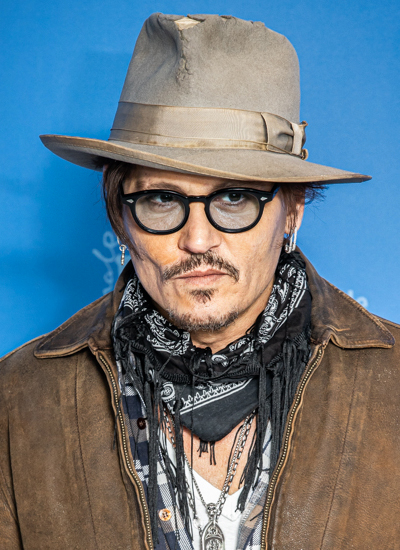
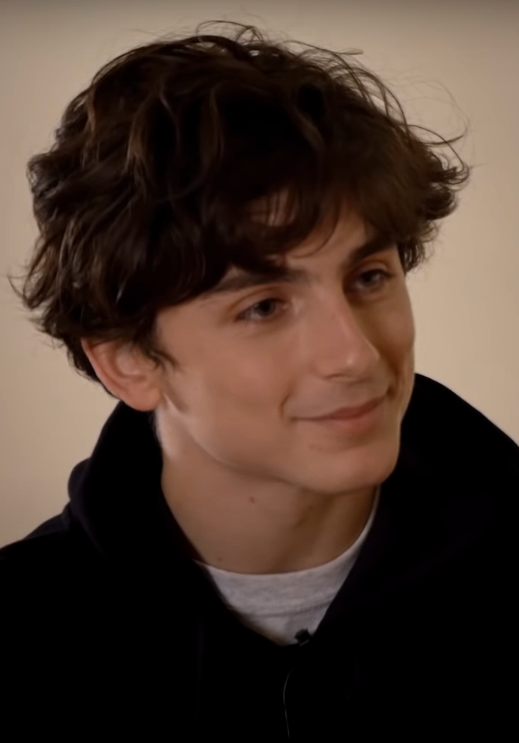
From left to right: Willy Wonka was portrayed by Gene Wilder in the 1971 film adaptation, Johnny Depp in the 2005 film adaptation, and Timothée Chalamet in the 2023 standalone film that serves as an origin story for the character.

In the novels and films, Willy Wonka is the eccentric owner of the world's largest candy factory, making candy and chocolate. Wonka holds a contest, hiding 5 Golden Tickets within the wrappers of his chocolate bars, promising their finders a tour of his factory and a lifelong supply of his creations.

In the novels, Wonka has a black goatee and "marvelously" bright eyes, a high and "flutey" voice, a face "alight of fun and laughter", and quick little jerky movements "like a squirrel". He is enthusiastic, talkative, friendly, and charming, but is sometimes insensitive and has been given to glossing self-criticism.

In the 1971 film Willy Wonka & the Chocolate Factory, he is portrayed by Gene Wilder. While his personality remains generally the same as in the book, he is more melancholy here, occasionally puts on an act of being crazy and sadistic, and frequently quotes books and poems, including William Shakespeare's Romeo and Juliet ("Is it my soul that calls upon my name?"), John Masefield's "Sea-Fever" ("All I ask is a tall ship and a star to steer her by"), and Ogden Nash's "Reflections on Ice-Breaking" ("Candy is dandy, but liquor is quicker"), among many others. Toward the end of the film, he tests Charlie's conscience by reprimanding him and pretending to deny him any reward, but assumes an almost paternal role when Charlie proves to be honest after all. In the 2017 film Tom and Jerry: Willy Wonka and the Chocolate Factory, adapting the 1971 film, but with the addition of Hanna-Barbera characters Tom and Jerry, he is voiced by J. P. Karliak.

In the 2005 film Charlie and the Chocolate Factory, he is portrayed by Johnny Depp. In this version, a backstory was added, which reveals his troubled upbringing: Willy Wonka's father (being a dentist) would not let him eat sweets because of the potential risk to his teeth, so the young Wonka ran away from home to travel to Switzerland and Bavaria and become a chocolatier. At the end of the film, Wonka reconciles with his father, who is revealed to have collected newspaper clippings of his son's success.

In the 2023 film Wonka, which serves as a prequel to the film Willy Wonka & the Chocolate Factory, he is portrayed by Timothée Chalamet. The film tells an origin story for the character about his early days as a chocolatier in Europe after seven years of traveling around the world. A new backstory was added, which reveals his even more troubled upbringing: When he was a child, Willy Wonka and his mother were poor and she made chocolate bars on the rare occasions that she was able to, until she eventually died because of an illness. At the end of the film, after exposing the crimes of the local Chocolate Cartel (which is composed of Arthur Slugworth, Gerald Prodnose, and Felix Fickelgruber), Wonka opens the last chocolate bar his mother left him, which is revealed to contain a golden paper with a message telling him that chocolate is best when it is shared with others. He then acquires an abandoned castle and commences turning it into a chocolate factory, and the Oompa-Loompa Lofty agrees to be his taste tester.

=== Charlie Bucket ===
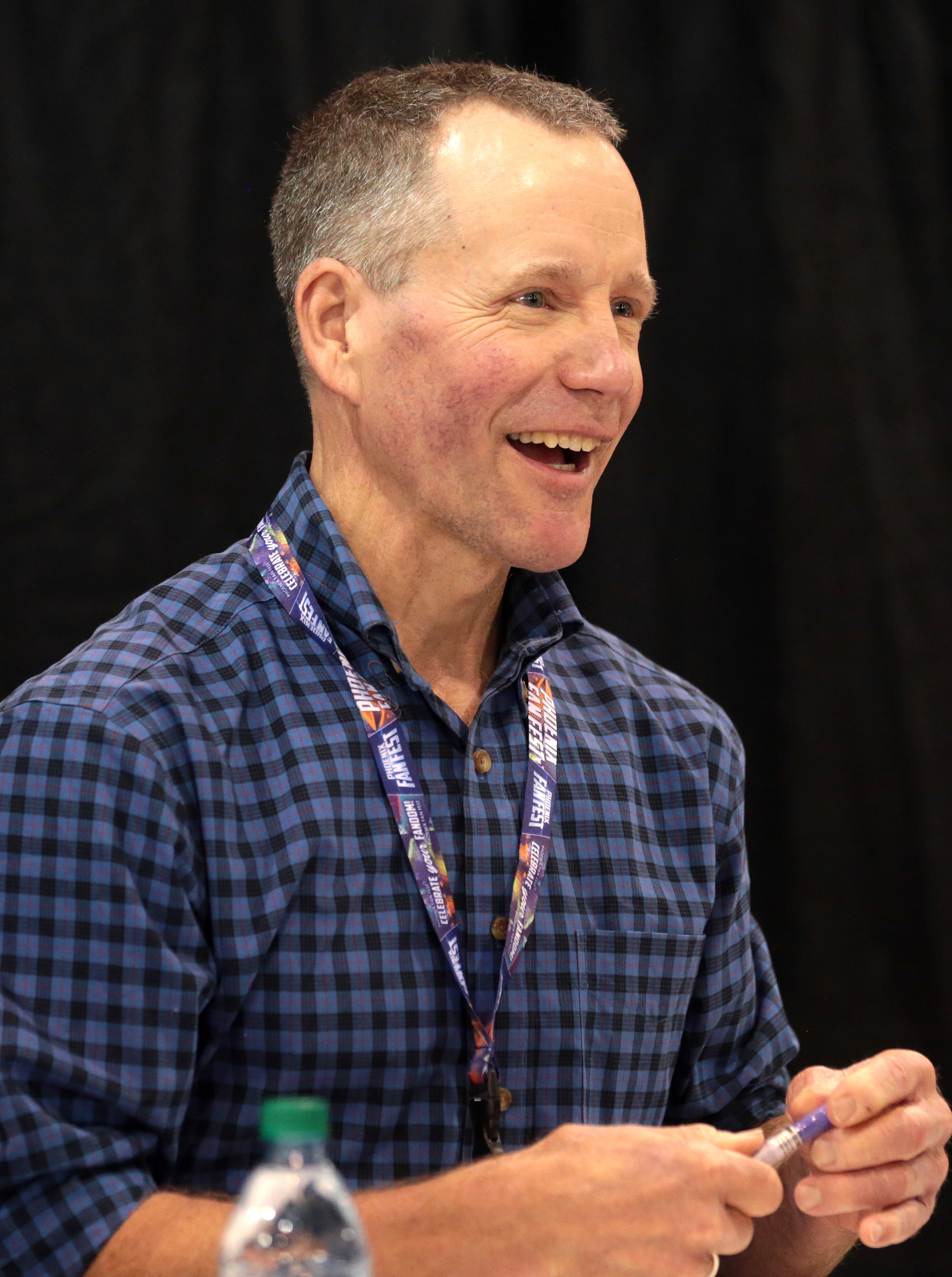
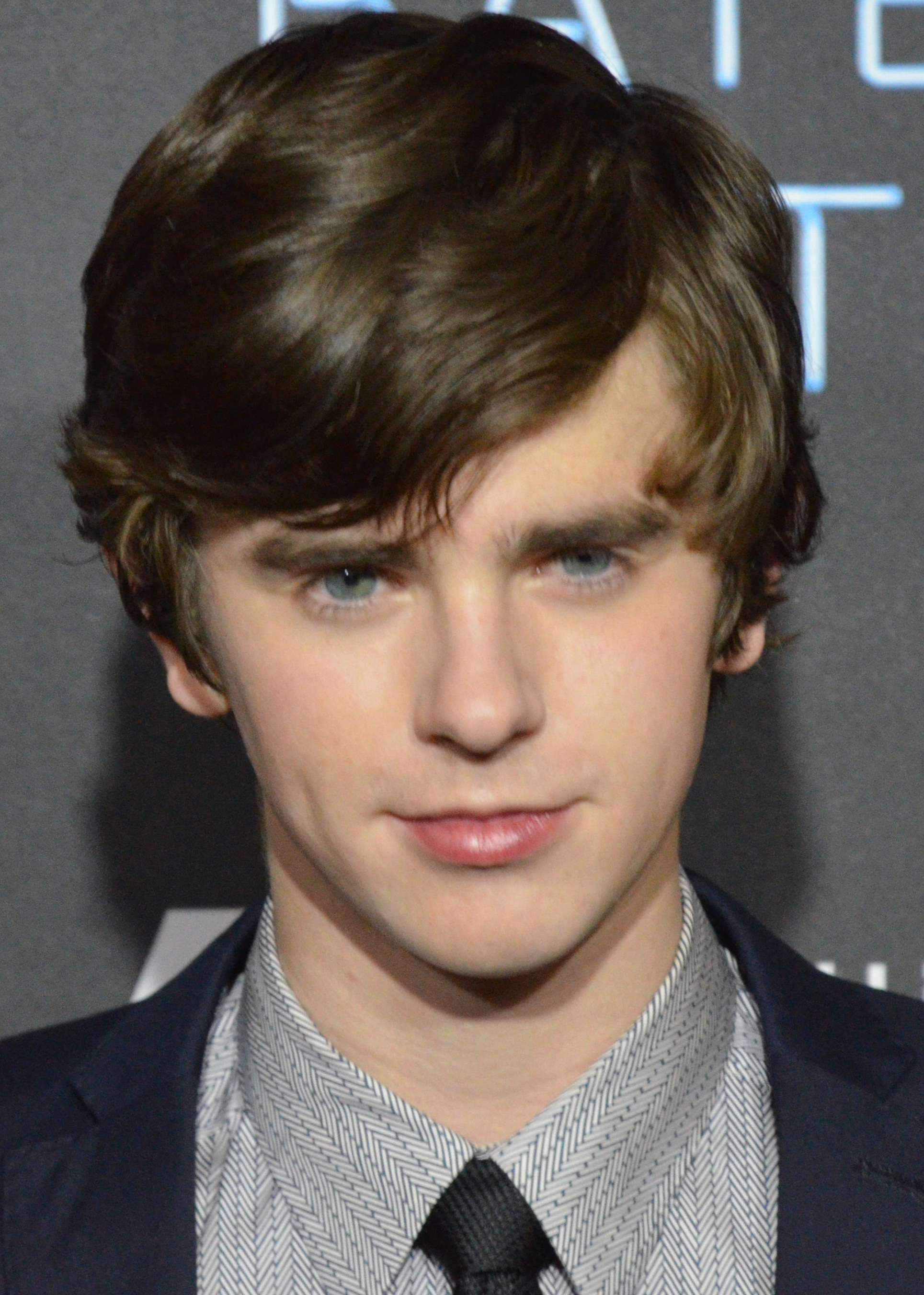
Peter Ostrum (left) portrayed Charlie Bucket in the 1971 film adaptation while Freddie Highmore (right) portrayed the character in the 2005 film adaptation.

Charlie Bucket is the main character of the book Charlie and the Chocolate Factory and its sequel Charlie and the Great Glass Elevator, and the film adaptations of the former. Dahl's widow said that Charlie was originally intended to be black. He is depicted as a kindhearted boy who lives in poverty with his mother, father, and four grandparents. In the original film, he has a newspaper route after school, his father is dead, and his mother cares for him as a solo parent. He and his family follow the progress of the hunt for the Golden Tickets in newspapers and television. In the 2005 film, Charlie's father is revealed to have lost his job at a toothpaste factory, having been made redundant after the factory purchased a robot to do the job that he had, only to be rehired as a technician at the end of the film. Unlike the first four finalists, Charlie is honest and generous. He is actually worried if the other nasty children, such as Augustus and Veruca, will actually be alive after their ordeals. This positive depiction of an honest, caring young boy contradicted how Dahl originally unintentionally negatively portrayed Oompa-Loompas as a racially insensitive caricature of imported African slaves. In the 1971 film, Charlie was portrayed by Peter Ostrum in his only film appearance. In the 2005 film, Charlie was portrayed by Freddie Highmore.

=== Grandpa Joe ===
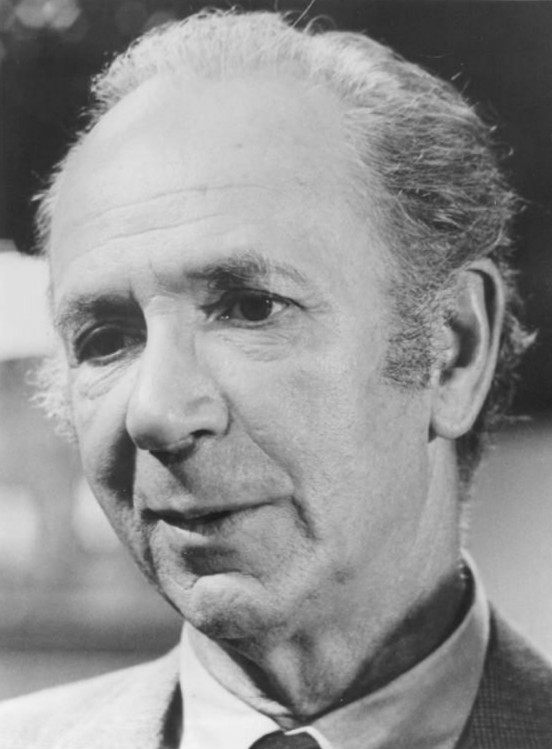
Jack Albertson (pictured in 1971) portrayed Grandpa Joe in the 1971 film adaptation.

Grandpa Joe is one of Charlie's four bed-ridden grandparents. He tells Charlie (and the reader) the story of Willy Wonka's chocolate factory and the mystery of the secret workers. When Charlie finds the Golden Ticket, Grandpa Joe leaps out of bed in joy and is chosen as the one to accompany Charlie on the tour of the factory. In the sequel book, he and all members of Charlie's family ride with Charlie and Wonka in the Great Glass Elevator and assist the rescue of the Commuter Capsule from the Vermicious Knids. Grandpa Joe's age is given as "ninety-six and a half" in Charlie and the Chocolate Factory, making him the eldest of Charlie's grandparents, but in the musical, it is stated he is almost ninety and a half.

The character was played by Jack Albertson in the 1971 film adaptation Willy Wonka & the Chocolate Factory. In this film, he is often excitable, paranoid, and stubborn, and convinces Charlie to sneak away from the tour to try Fizzy Lifting Drinks. He becomes angry when Charlie is dismissed without reward and threatens to give the everlasting gobstopper to Slugworth before Charlie returns it of his own volition.

The character was played by David Kelly in the 2005 film adaptation, Charlie and the Chocolate Factory. Veteran actor Gregory Peck was originally selected to play the role, but he died in 2003 before filming began. This version of the character is written as more calm than the 1971 version. An original backstory to Grandpa Joe's past was added to Tim Burton's film, wherein it is said that Joe worked for Wonka until the latter fired all his workers from his factory due to constant corporate espionage by rival confectionery manufacturers. When he returns to the factory with Charlie for the tour and stated that he used to work for him, Wonka asks if he was one of the spies working for one of his rivals. Joe assures he wasn't and Wonka welcomes him back.

While Grandpa Joe is portrayed sympathetically in all versions, the release of the 2005 film saw the character become the subject of heavy internet parody characterizing him as a "lazy freeloader who spends years in bed...then springs to life the moment there’s something fun for him to do."

== Other Golden Ticket winners ==
=== Augustus Gloop ===
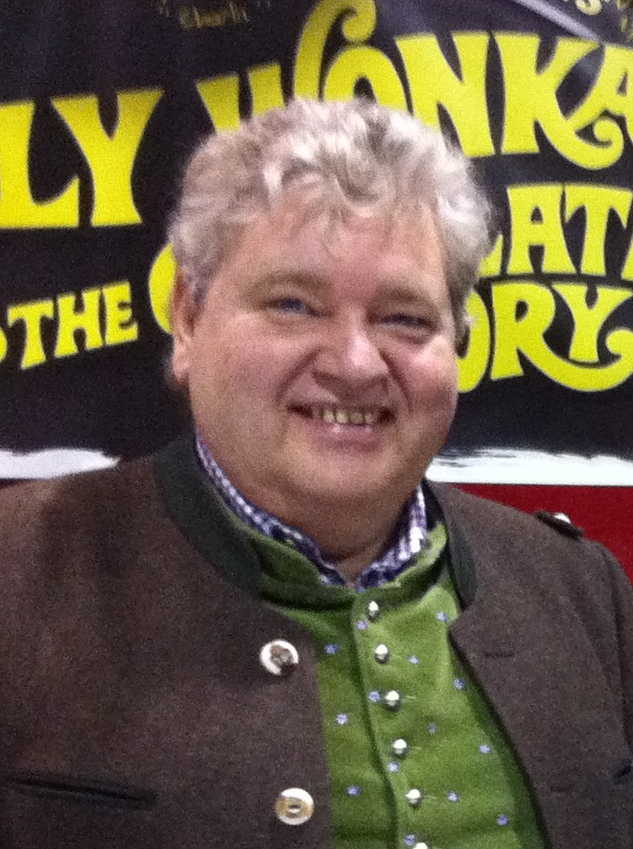
Michael Böllner (pictured in 2011) portrayed Augustus Gloop in the 1971 film adaptation.

Augustus Gloop is an obese, greedy, 9-year-old boy, the first person to find a Golden Ticket and one of the four main antagonists of Charlie and the Chocolate Factory. He hails from the fictional town of Dusselheim, West Germany in the 1971 film, and Düsseldorf, Germany in the 2005 film. His mother takes great pride in his gluttonous eating and seems to enjoy the attention of the media. In the novel and both films, he is portrayed as "enormously fat". Augustus is the first to be removed from the tour: while drinking from the Chocolate Room's Chocolate River, he accidentally falls into the river and is drawn through a pipe to the factory's Fudge Room. Wonka summons an Oompa-Loompa to take Augustus' parents to the Fudge Room to look for him and is advised to take a long stick and poke around in the big chocolate-mixing barrel. In the book, he is depicted leaving the factory extremely underweight from being squeezed in the pipe.

In the 1971 film, despite eating constantly, he is not as obese as he is in the book and has decent table manners. Although he appears uninterested in Charlie and the other three finalists due to his only aspiration being that of eating, he is seen as being polite to them. When Augustus falls into the chocolate river, Charlie tries to rescue him using a giant lollipop. He is portrayed by Michael Böllner in this film. Since Böllner could not speak fluent English at the time of the film's production, the 1971 Augustus has fewer lines and less screen time.

In the 2005 film, Augustus is always shown consuming chocolate. He has a binge eating disorder and often has food smeared on his face, additionally, his obesity is far more severe than the 1971 portrayal, causing him to have a slower, lumbering walk relative to the other children. He also displays a superiority complex, such as when he offers Charlie a bite of his Wonka Bar and then retracts it, saying that Charlie should have brought some himself. As in the book, he is shown leaving the factory underweight toward the end of the story; but in this version, he is his normal size, licking his fingers to remove the adherent chocolate that he is still coated in, to which his mother begs him to stop "eating his fingers". Augustus refuses, saying that he tastes "so good". The actor Philip Wiegratz wore a fatsuit for the production.

In the book, both of Augustus's parents accompany him to the factory. Both film versions contradict this, however, and only his mother goes with him.

In the 2013 London musical, Augustus Gloop is known as "the Bavarian Beefcake" in his Alpine community. His mother and father indulge his eating habits with sweets and pieces of sausage of which they (and sometimes Augustus) butcher themselves. In his number, "More of Him to Love", Frau Gloop reveals that she had vital organs removed to retrieve Augustus from the womb. They arrive at the factory wearing traditional Eastern European clothing, with Augustus in a red, argyle sweater and green shorts. When Augustus falls into the Chocolate River, Wonka summons the diversionary pumping system to divert the flow, while Oompa-Loompas dressed in red boiler suits sing, "Auf Wiedersehen, Augustus Gloop", as they prepare the chocolate, while Augustus travels through the main industrial pipe, occasionally getting stuck in it. The 2017 Broadway rendition of the musical does not largely alter the character, though he and all the other finalists (sans Charlie) are portrayed by adults. Further, Augustus's father is confirmed to be deceased; it is implied that Augustus actually devoured him.

=== Veruca Salt ===
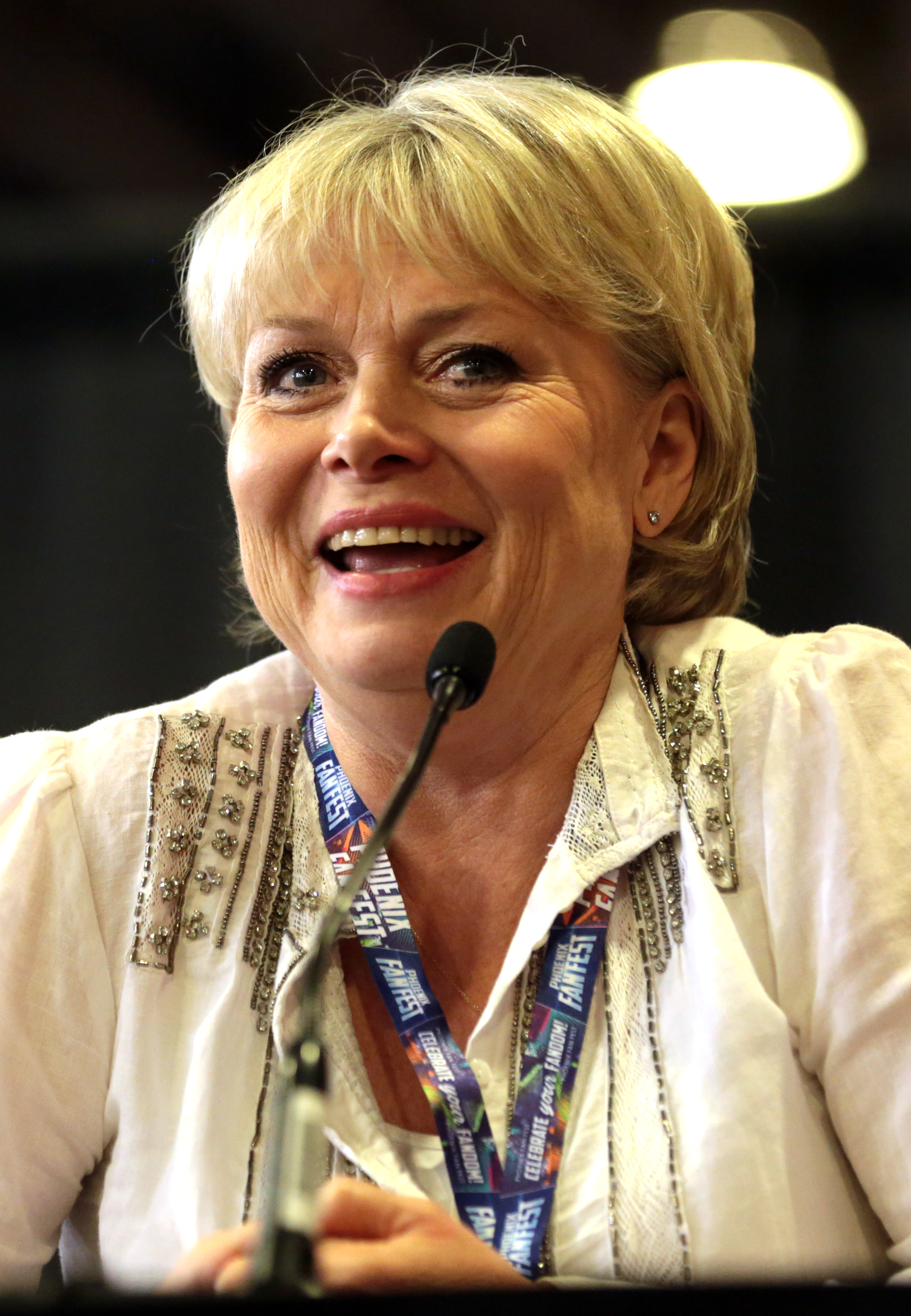
Julie Dawn Cole (pictured in 2017) portrayed Veruca Salt in the 1971 film adaptation.

Veruca Salt is a greedy, demanding, spoiled brat and one of the four main antagonists of Charlie and the Chocolate Factory. She demands everything she wants, and she wants everything she sees. Veruca is the second person to find a Golden Ticket and the third eliminated from the factory tour.

Unlike the other winners, Veruca did not find a golden ticket herself; rather her father instructed the workers of his peanut shelling factory to unwrap thousands of Wonka bars he had purchased until they found a golden ticket.

Showing her wealthy parents no mercy, and no regard for other people's property, Veruca frequently pesters her parents to purchase anything that catches her fancy. For example, when the tour reaches the Nut Sorting Room—a place where trained squirrels test each nut to see if it is good or bad by tapping it with their knuckles—Veruca demands that her parents buy a trained squirrel for her from Mr. Wonka. He refuses, so she goes into the squirrels' area to get one for herself. Instead, the squirrels grab her and declare her a "bad nut". After that, both she and her parents are thrown down the garbage chute to the furnace as Wonka hopes that today is not one of those days where it will be lit. Later, all three Salts are seen exiting the factory "covered in garbage".

In the 1971 film adaptation, she is portrayed by Julie Dawn Cole. Veruca has a fiery temper, rudely demands various desires nonstop, brags about her wealth, and chastises anyone who questions her. In this film, it is not squirrels but geese that lay special golden chocolate-filled eggs for Easter, one of which she demands. In this version, Veruca and Violet bicker on two occasions. There are also indications that she and her father have accepted Slugworth's proposition: in the Inventing Room, she and her father exchange a quick but meaningful look when Mr. Wonka first mentions and shows his Everlasting Gobstoppers, and when Mr. Wonka makes the children promise never to reveal or even talk to anyone about the Gobstoppers he gives them Veruca verbally agrees but crosses her fingers behind her back. Veruca is eliminated at the end of her musical number ("I Want it Now") after climbing a machine designed to tell whether or not the golden eggs are "good" or "bad" eggs. The machine judges her as a "bad egg", and she disappears down the garbage chute. Her father, who tried to rescue Veruca, is judged the same and follows suit.

In the 2005 film adaptation, she is portrayed by Julia Winter. Veruca's elimination remains nearly the same as in the book, with only a few changes. Her demeanor is less vehement, but more obnoxious and manipulative, as compared to the 1971 film version. Also in the 2005 film, it is revealed that she owns a pony, two dogs, four cats, six rabbits, two parakeets, three canaries, a parrot, a turtle, and a hamster, totaling up to 21 pets. The pony is not mentioned in the book. When Veruca tries to take one of the trained squirrels used by Wonka to select the best nuts to bake into chocolate bars, she is knocked down by all the squirrels, judged as a "bad nut" and discarded into the garbage chute, with her dad following after when a squirrel pushed him in as he approached the chute. An Oompa-Loompa later informs Wonka that the incinerator is broken and that there will be three weeks of rotten garbage to break their fall. Both are later seen leaving the factory covered in garbage, with Veruca's father trying with extraordinary effort to contain his visible anger against her. When leaving the factory, Veruca sees the Great Glass Elevator and demands one from her father. Instead of cheerfully catering to Veruca's demands as before, her father tells her sternly that the only thing she will be getting that day "is a bath, and that’s final". Not only has his opinion of Veruca changed, but he also changes his ways of disciplining her, having realized how much he and his wife have spoiled her. When Veruca protests, he fiercely glares at her, prompting her to be quiet.

Veruca's nationality was never specified in Dahl's novel, but she hails from an upper-class family in England in both films, and in the 2005 film she lives in Buckinghamshire. In the book, both of Veruca's parents accompany her to the factory; in both film versions, only her father accompanies her.

In the 2013 Sam Mendes London musical, Veruca Salt is a British billionaire's daughter, dressed in a pink ballerina tutu and baby seal fur coat – "clubbed and tickled pink". Her father, Sir Robert Salt, is portrayed as a spineless dolt for giving his daughter her wishes. In the Nut Sorting Room, Veruca runs afoul of the nut-testing squirrels who deem her a 'bad nut' when she tries to steal one of them. This summons oversized squirrels with Oompa-Loompas riding on their backs. They sing a nightmarish ballad, "Veruca's Nutcracker Sweet", that concludes with Veruca and her father sent down the garbage chute; it has similar lyrics to the original book – although in the book version, both of Veruca parents follow her down the garbage chute. In the Broadway version, Veruca's nationality is changed to Russian, and the squirrels tear her apart limb by limb, but Wonka assures the group that the Oompa-Loompas will be able to put her back together again.

In the Tom and Jerry version of the 1971 film, Veruca's role is the same. Veruca and her father along with Jerry and Tuffy manage to escape the furnace right before it ignites while trapping Tom inside. Veruca demands her father to take her home and buy her a chocolate factory of her own. Having had enough of Veruca's spoiled and selfish behaviour, Mr. Salt states that she is lucky that they weren't burned to a crisp and that he'll give her some discipline when they get home as he drags her away.

=== Violet Beauregarde ===
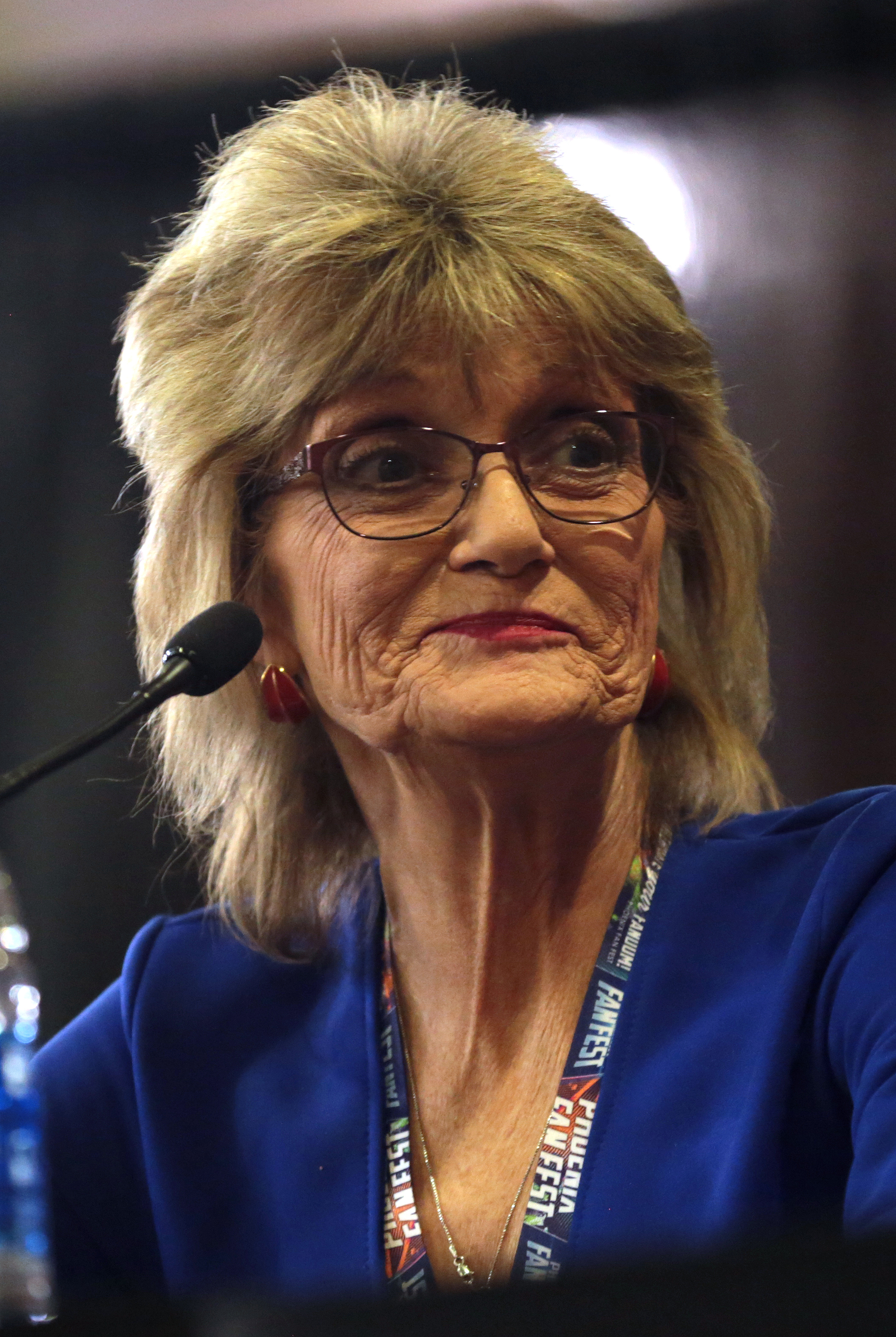
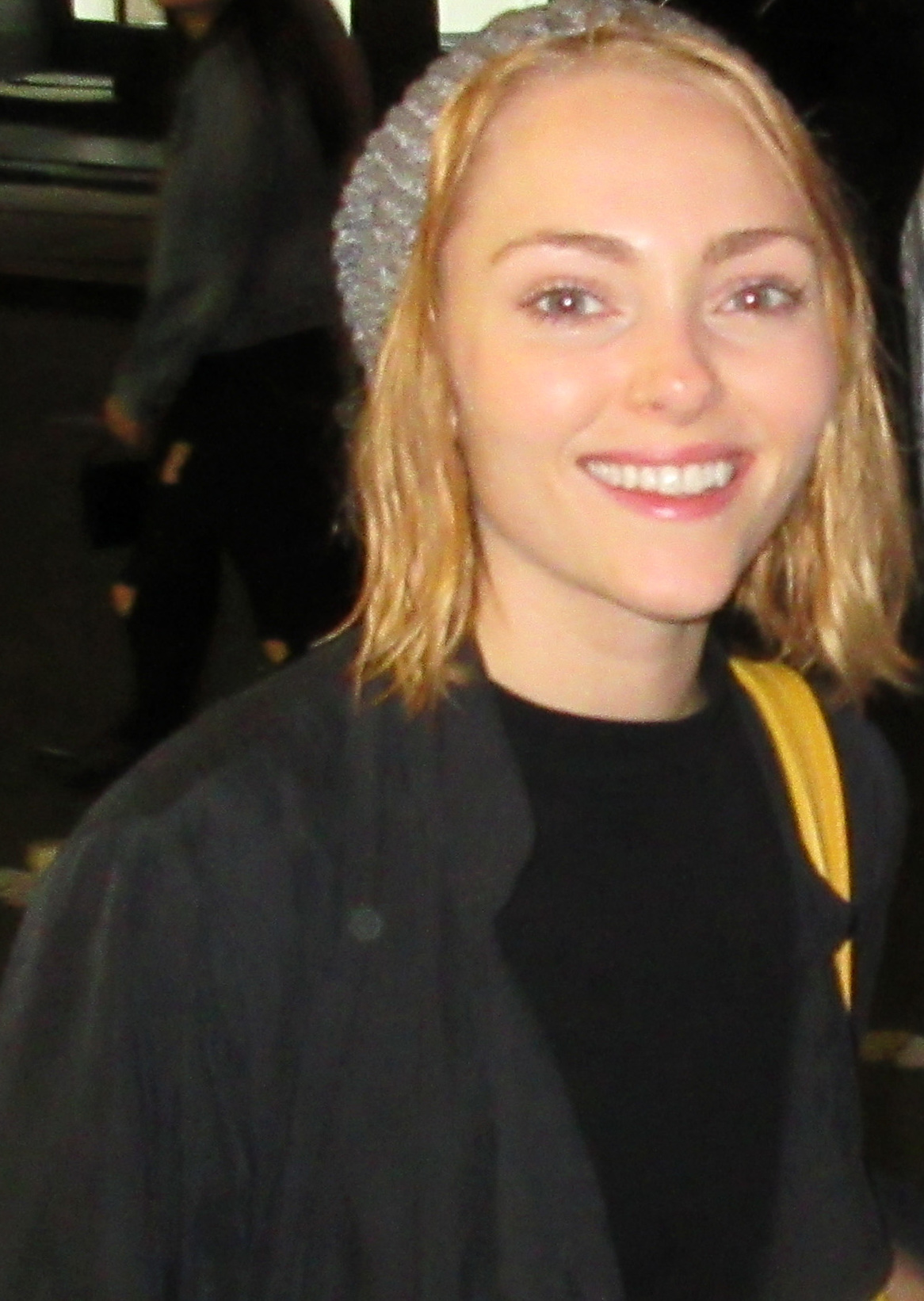
Denise Nickerson (left) portrayed Violet Beauregarde in the 1971 film adaptation while AnnaSophia Robb (right) portrayed the character in the 2005 film adaptation.

Violet Beauregarde is a skillful, self-centered, rude, and chewing gum-obsessed girl, the third person to find a Golden Ticket, one of the four main antagonists of Charlie and the Chocolate Factory, and the second to be eliminated from the tour. Violet chews gum obsessively and boasts that she has been chewing the same piece "for three months solid", a world record which Violet proclaims was previously held by her best friend Cornelia Prinzmetel. She is also aggressively competitive and prideful and has won trophies for gum chewing and other activities. She has brown hair in the 1971 film, while in the 2005 film, she has blonde hair. In the 1971 film, she is shown to be from Miles City, Montana, while in the 2005 film, she is from Atlanta, Georgia.

When Wonka shows the group around the Inventing Room, he stops to display a new type of gum he is working on. The gum doubles as a three-course meal which is composed of tomato soup, roast beef and a baked potato, and blueberry pie and ice cream. Violet is intrigued and eager to try it out, so despite Wonka's protests, she snatches and chews the gum. She is delighted by its effects but, when she reaches the dessert, blueberry pie, her skin starts turning an indigo color and her body begins to swell up. When her swelling stops, she resembles a round blueberry. After explaining that it was tried by 20 Oompa-Loompas who had the same outcome, Wonka has two Oompa-Loompas roll her to the Juicing Room at once to have the juice squeezed out of her. She is last seen leaving the factory with the other children, restored to her normal size but still with indigo skin, which Wonka says nothing can be done about.

In the 1971 film, 12-year-old Violet is impatient, arrogant, self-centred, vain, and impulsive; however, she is also polite to everyone, with the exception of Veruca Salt, with whom she persistently argues. She is accompanied by her father, Sam Beauregarde, a fast-talking car salesman who tries to advertise his business whenever he can. She demeans Cornelia Prinzmetel more than she did in the book. Her blueberry form is relatively small, and her hair color remains unchanged. Violet is informed that she must be juiced immediately before she explodes and is last seen en route to the Juicing Room. She was portrayed by Denise Nickerson.

In the 2005 film, 12-year old Violet is described as being "brash, rude and insanely competitive". Aside from gum-chewing, she also has many other interests that reflect her obsession with always winning, such as in karate. She is accompanied on the tour by her single mother, Scarlett Beauregarde (a former baton champion herself), whose own competitive personality appears to have had an influence on her daughter, as Scarlett expresses pride over Violet's 263 trophies and medals. Cornelia Prinzmetel was not mentioned in this film. In this version, when she and Veruca interact with each other, they suggest being best friends, though they do not really like each other. Violet is also shown to be anti-social and malicious, such as when she briefly insults Charlie, snatching a piece of confectionery from his hand, and then, when he tries to interact with her, calling him a loser. She turns blue and swells into a 10-foot blueberry before being rolled off to the Juicing Room by the Oompa-Loompas to squeeze the juice out of her body. Violet is shown leaving the factory cartwheeling as a consequence of her increased flexibility, which she is happy about. She is portrayed by AnnaSophia Robb.

In the 2013 Sam Mendes London musical, Violet Beauregarde is portrayed as an African-American, Californian fame-hungry wannabe, with her agent/father Eugene Beauregarde parlaying her mundane talent of gum chewing into celebrity status, with multitude of endorsements including her own TV show, line of perfume, and a clothing boutique franchise. Her theme is called "The Double-Bubble Duchess". It is revealed that Violet's chewing "skill" was picked up when she was a baby and her mother tried to get her to stop talking all the time. Violet and her father are escorted by an entourage to the factory entrance. Violet comes dressed in a sparkly purple and pink disco jumper and a pink backpack. Upon swelling in the influence of the experimental gum (which consisted of tomato soup, roast chicken, potatoes and gravy, Fizzy Orange, cheese and crackers and blueberry pie), she panics and runs away as the Oompa-Loompas break into a disco number, "Juicy", and roller skate along the stage as Violet lifts into the air, resembling a giant purple disco ball. Mr. Beauregarde phones his lawyer excitedly, with intent to profit from Violet's new size, until Violet explodes. Wonka's only reassurance of her survival is the prospect of rescuing the pieces and de-juicing them. In the Broadway version, the song "Juicy" is cut out (the only child-exit song to be cut from the London version), and Violet instead becomes a blueberry and explodes in the background when an Oompa-Loompa blows an air-dart at her while Wonka explains how he met the Oompa-Loompas to the group. Her theme is also changed to "The Queen Of Pop."

=== Mike Teavee ===
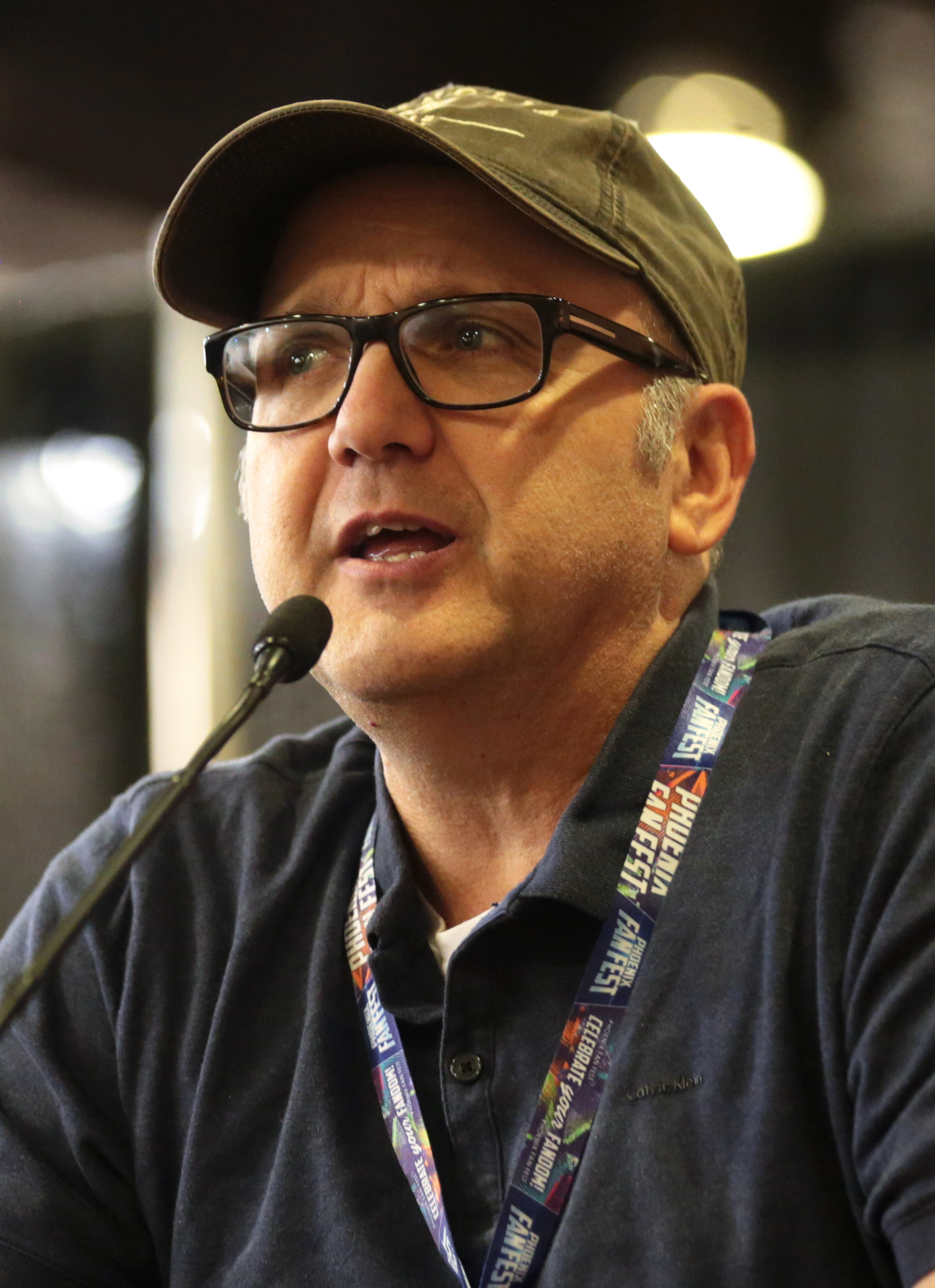
Paris Themmen (pictured in 2017) portrayed Mike Teavee in the 1971 film adaptation.

Mike Teavee is a 9-year-old boy who does nothing but watch television, both the fourth Golden Ticket finder and the fourth to be eliminated from the tour, and one of the four main antagonists of Charlie and the Chocolate Factory. He was described as adorned with 18 toy pistols that he "fires" while watching gangsters on TV. He is bad-tempered and slothful, but also intelligent, and asks Wonka several questions (which go unanswered) throughout the tour. How he found his Golden Ticket is never explained in the book or the 1971 film, as he is too absorbed in his television viewing to talk to the press about it. In the 2005 film, he does have an explanation of how he found the Golden Ticket: he used an algorithm to find it as an intellectual exercise. In the book, both of Mike's parents tour the factory with him. When in the glass elevator that can go any direction, Mike pushes a button that says Television Chocolate. During a display of miniaturisation technology, used to transport chocolate, Mike shrinks himself to a tiny size, and Willy Wonka has an Oompa-Loompa take the Teavee family to the Gum-Stretcher Room to get Mike stretched back to normal. Mike is last seen exiting the factory, now "ten feet tall and thin as a wire" because the Oompa-Loompas had overstretched him. His last name resembles the word TV in connection to his love of electronics.

In the 1971 film, Mike is played by Paris Themmen and his surname is spelled "Teevee" in the credits. Mike is nine years old and accompanied to the factory by his high-strung mother. He is from the fictional town of Marble Falls, Arizona, enjoys Western films and wears cowboy attire. He makes constant references to television shows throughout the factory tour and comes across as somewhat of a know-it-all. Although easily annoyed, he does not have any major anger issues and gets along relatively well with the other kids. After being shrunk to 3 inches (7.6 cm), Mike is taken to the Taffy Pulling Room to be stretched back to normal, which causes his mother to faint. Unlike the book, he (on the advice of his mother) is receptive to Slugworth's bribe.

In the 2005 film, 12-year-old Mike is portrayed by Jordan Fry, and his interests are updated to being very destructive, with the Internet and video games (especially gory first-person shooters) in addition to television viewing. In this version, he is from Denver, Colorado, is accompanied by his father, and is portrayed as more disrespectful and violent. In the Chocolate Room, when Wonka told everyone to enjoy his candy, he did not eat anything, instead he was stomping on a candy pumpkin, completely destroying it in the process, and when Mr. Teavee told him to stop, he ignores him with a brief sentence: "Dad, he said 'enjoy'!" Also, whenever he says something critical of Wonka's company, or his ideas, Wonka reacts as if Mike is mumbling, even though he is not. He is able to find the Golden Ticket by using math and logic, though he admits that he does not even like chocolate. When Mike demands to know why candy is pointless, Charlie tries to reason with him, saying candy does not have to have a point, then he exclaims that candy is a waste of time (like Wonka's father), but then Wonka's flashback reappears again. When they arrive in the Television Chocolate Room, Mike points that Wonka could use his teleportation device to revolutionise mankind, as opposed to distributing his products, ignoring the fact that anything sent by television gets shrunk. When Mr. Teavee tries to reason with his son, the boy insults Wonka and sends himself by television. After the incident in the Television Chocolate Room, Willy Wonka has an Oompa-Loompa take Mr. Teavee and Mike to the Taffy-Puller Room to have Mike stretched back to normal. When Mike and his father are later seen leaving the factory, Mike is 10 ft (3 m) tall, as well as incredibly thin and flat.

In the 2013 Sam Mendes London musical, Mike Teavee (now age 10) lives in a suburban neighbourhood with his disinterested father Norman Teavee and neurotic, alcoholic mother, Doris Teavee; in this version, he is wearing a black shirt with an orange jacket on the outside. Their opening number, "It's Teavee Time!" has Mrs. Teavee presenting her family as a normal, functioning household, downplaying Mike's violent tendencies like setting a cat on fire, chloroforming a nurse, and stealing a German tank. In the Department of the Future, where Wonka transmits chocolate by television, Mike jumps into the machine and transmits himself, much to his mother's horror. Wonka summons the monitors to see on which channel Mike has ended, as the Oompa-Loompas rave around the room, singing, "Vidiots". Near the end, Mrs. Teavee joins the rave, as they conclude that Mike still has a future on "mike.com". When Mike is shrunk as a result of the transporter, Mrs. Teavee happily takes him home, as he can no longer cause trouble and she can take care of him like when he was a baby. Unlike the other versions, he wasn't stretched back to normal. In the Broadway version of the musical, Mike hails from Iowa, and the lyrics in Mike's song, "What Could Possibly Go Wrong?", and some of Mike's mannerisms reference Donald Trump. In the musical, he is the only one out of the four spoiled children to be confirmed leaving the factory.

== Other characters ==
=== Mr. Fickelgruber ===
Mr. Fickelgruber
- Charlie and the Chocolate Factory character
- First appearance: Charlie and the Chocolate Factory (1964)
- Created by: Roald Dahl
- Portrayed by: Tony Kirkwood (2005); Mathew Baynton (2023)

In-universe information
- Gender: Male

In the book, Mr. Fickelgruber is one of Willy Wonka's rival chocolatiers. Fickelgruber, alongside Wonka's other main rivals Mr. Prodnose and Arthur Slugworth, sent in spies to steal the secret recipes to Wonka's treats where they manufactured it nearly ruining Wonka's factory. In Fickelgruber's case, he made an ice cream that never melted even in the hottest sun.

After Wonka re-opens his factory (operated exclusively by the Oompa-Loompas), Fickelgruber is never heard from again, but it is stated that he and the rest "would give his front teeth" to enter Wonka's inventing room for three minutes.

Fickelgruber makes a split-second appearance in the 2005 film portrayed by Tony Kirkwood.

Fickelgruber appears in the 2023 film portrayed by Mathew Baynton where his first name is Felix. He alongside Prodnose and Slugworth are members of the Chocolate Cartel.

=== Mr. Prodnose ===
Mr. Prodnose
- Charlie and the Chocolate Factory character
- First appearance: Charlie and the Chocolate Factory (1964)
- Created by: Roald Dahl
- Portrayed by: Chris Cresswell (2005); Matt Lucas (2023)

In-universe information
- Gender: Male

In the book, Mr. Prodnose is one of Willy Wonka's rival chocolatiers. Prodnose, alongside Wonka's other main rivals Mr. Fickelgruber and Arthur Slugworth, sent in spies to steal the secret recipes to Wonka's treats where they manufactured it nearly ruining Wonka's factory. In Prodnose's case, he made a chewing gum that never lost its flavor.

After Wonka re-opens his factory (operated exclusively by the Oompa-Loompas), Prodnose is never heard from again, but it is stated that he and the rest "would give his front teeth" to enter Wonka's inventing room for three minutes.

Prodnose makes a split-second appearance in the 2005 film portrayed by Chris Cresswell.

Prodnose appears in the 2023 film portrayed by Matt Lucas where his first name is Gerald and wore a wig. He alongside Fickelgruber and Slugworth are depicted as members of the Chocolate Cartel.

=== Arthur Slugworth ===
Mr. Slugworth
- Charlie and the Chocolate Factory character
- First appearance: Charlie and the Chocolate Factory (1964)
- Created by: Roald Dahl
- Portrayed by: Philip Philmar (2005); Paterson Joseph (2023)

In-universe information
- Gender: Male

In the book, Slugworth is one of Willy Wonka's rival chocolatiers. Slugworth, alongside Wonka's other main rivals Mr. Fickelgruber and Mr. Prodnose, sent in spies to steal the secret recipes to Wonka's treats where they manufactured their versions of it nearly ruining Wonka's factory. In Slugworth's case, he made candy balloons that could be blown to large sizes.

After Wonka re-opens his factory (operated exclusively by the Oompa-Loompas), Slugworth is never heard from again, but it is stated that he and the rest "would give his front teeth" to enter Wonka's inventing room for three minutes. In the 1971 movie, Willy Wonka states that Slugworth would give his false teeth to get in for just five minutes.

The real Slugworth makes a split-second appearance in the 2005 film where he, alongside Mr. Ficklegruber and Mr. Prodnose, are sending spies to steal ingredients from Wonka's factory just like in the book. He is here played by Philip Philmar in a scene where one of his spies meets up with him after work and gives him a copy of an ingredient.

Slugworth appears in the 2023 film portrayed by Paterson Joseph. He alongside Fickelgruber and Prodnose are depicted as members of the Chocolate Cartel where Slugworth has a strong handshake. In addition, Slugworth is the uncle of an orphan named Noodle who he abandoned with the laundress/hotel manager Mrs. Scrubitt so that she wouldn't inherit her claim to the family fortune following the death of his brother Zebedee.

==== Mr. Wilkinson ====
Mr. Wilkinson
- Charlie and the Chocolate Factory character
- First appearance: Willy Wonka & the Chocolate Factory (1971)
- Created by: Roald Dahl
- Portrayed by: Günter Meisner (1971)
- Voiced by: Walker Edmiston (1971, uncredited); Mick Wingert (Tom and Jerry: Willy Wonka and the Chocolate Factory)

In-universe information
- Alias: Arthur Slugworth
- Gender: Male

"Slugworth" has a role as an enigmatic villain in the 1971 film. Inside Bill's Candy Shop, Wonka's products and signs are the most visible; but Slugworth's Sizzlers are also prominent, and one is even sold to a child. Also seen are signs for Fickelgruber's candy. Grandpa Joe describes Slugworth as the worst of Wonka's rivals. As each Golden Ticket is found, a sinister man approaches the finder and whispers something into his or her ear. First he posed as a waiter when approaching Augustus Gloop. Next, he posed as a factory worker helping a female sheller who found the Golden Ticket to Mr. Salt when approaching Veruca Salt. Next, he posed as a man washing cars on Mr. Beauregard's car lot when approaching Violet Beauregard. Finally, he posed as a reporter when approaching Mike Teevee. After Charlie finds the last ticket, the same man approaches Charlie under the bridge as well, introduces himself as Arthur Slugworth, and offers the child a bribe to bring him one piece of the newly invented 'Everlasting Gobstopper', allowing him to copy the formula and prevent the future invention from ruining his business. Two of the children (Veruca and Mike) respond to Slugworth's bribe. When tempted by Grandpa Joe in order to get even with Wonka for declaring that Charlie lost, Charlie returns the Everlasting Gobstopper to Wonka who changed his mind. Wonka eventually reveals that the tempter is not the real Slugworth, but his own employee Mr. Wilkinson and that his offer was a moral test of character. Slugworth/Wilkinson was played by Günter Meisner, a West German actor, while his speaking voice was provided by an uncredited Walker Edmiston.

In the Tom and Jerry 2017 animated remake of the 1971 film, "Slugworth" is the main antagonist instead of an enigmatic villain where he is portrayed by Mick Wingert. When he first meets Charlie, he sings a cover of Veruca's song "I Want it Now" and also sings it again as a duet with Veruca during her downfall. He teams up with Spike to steal a Gobstopper from the factory, but the two are thwarted by Charlie, Tom, and Jerry. Nevertheless, Tom and Jerry help Charlie get the last word on Slugworth/Wilkinson and Spike by shrinking them with the Wonkavision that previously shrunk Mike. Tuffy states that it might take awhile for them to pull themselves together. Despite being more emphasised as a villain, he is still revealed to be Wonka's employee Mr. Wilkinson, much to Tom and Jerry's dismay and to Spike's surprise.

=== Prince Pondicherry / Prince Puducherry ===
Prince Pondicherry Prince Puducherry
- Charlie and the Chocolate Factory character
- First appearance: Charlie and the Chocolate Factory (1964)
- Created by: Roald Dahl
- Portrayed by: Nitin Ganatra (2005)

In-universe information
- Gender: Male

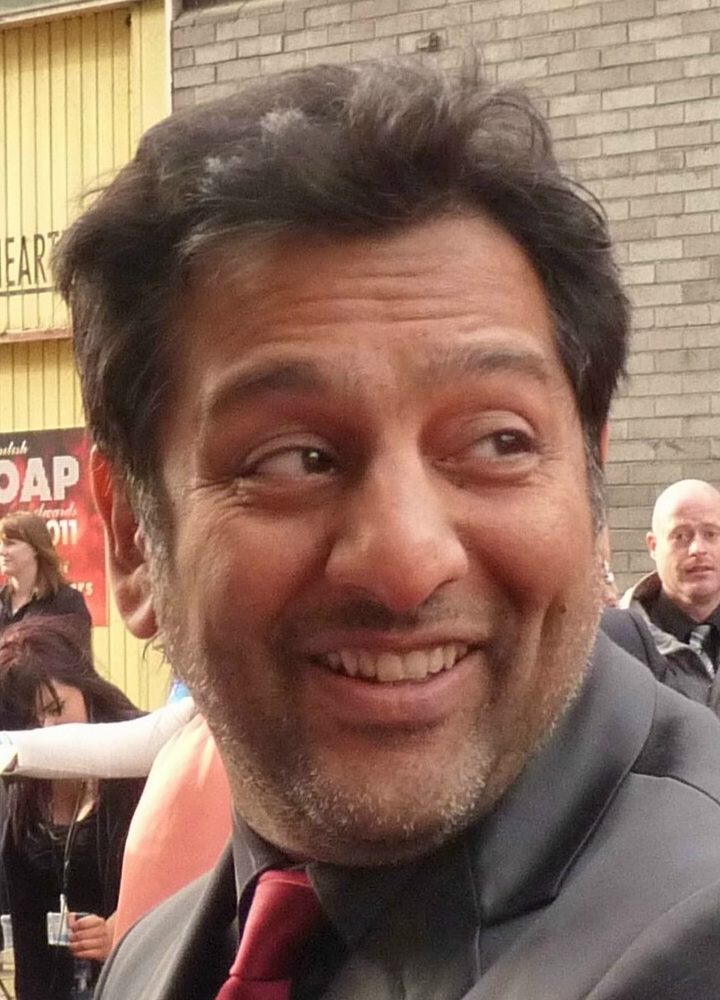
Nitin Ganatra (pictured in 2011) portrayed Prince Pondicherry in the 2005 film adaptation

Prince Pondicherry (renamed Prince Puducherry in controversially revised book version) is a prince who lives in India. He appears in the third chapter of the novel when Grandpa Joe is telling Charlie a story. In the story, Wonka makes him a chocolate palace in India, and advises him to eat it before it melts. He does not take this advice, insisting that he intends to live in the palace, which later does melt in the heat of the sun. His name derives from the city of Pondicherry (officially spelled Puducherry since 2006) in southeastern India.

He is absent from the 1971 film version, but makes a brief appearance in Tim Burton's Charlie and the Chocolate Factory, where he is played by Nitin Ganatra. His story here matches that in the book, except in depicting his wife (portrayed by Shelley Conn). After his chocolate palace melted, the Prince wrote a letter to Wonka demanding a second chocolate palace that won't melt. He did not receive one due to Wonka dealing with problems of his own at the time when his rivals were sending spies to infiltrate his work force and get a copy of the specific ingredients.

In the 2013 musical, he drowns in the melted chocolate from his palace along with his wife.

=== The Oompa-Loompas ===
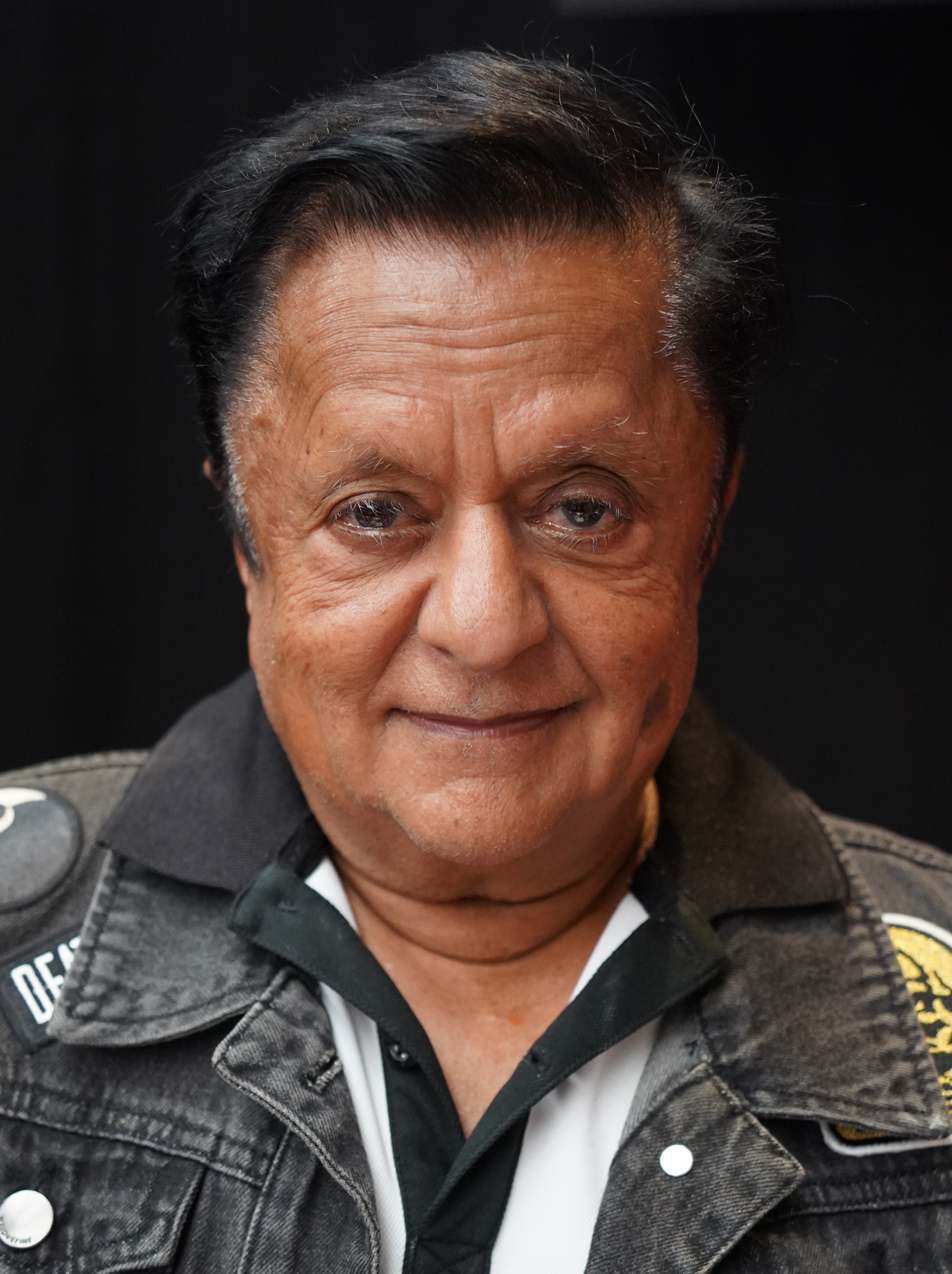
Deep Roy (pictured in 2024) portrayed the Oompa-Loompas in the 2005 film adaptation.

The Oompa-Loompas (also written as Oompa Loompas) are small humans who were preyed upon by the various predators that reside in their homeland before Wonka invited them to work at his factory. They are paid in their favourite food, cocoa beans, which were extremely rare on their island. The Oompa-Loompas are mischievous, "[thinking] everything's a colossal joke"; they love to play practical jokes and sing songs which, according to Wonka, they are very good at improvising. They sing a song at the end of each child's comeuppance.

In early editions of the novel, the Oompa-Loompas (originally called "Whipple-Scrumpets" before publication) are shown as black African pygmies. In the 1971 film Willy Wonka & the Chocolate Factory they were written to be played by actors with dwarfism and are portrayed as orange-skinned, green-haired men in striped shirts and baggy lederhosen-like pants following criticism from the National Association for the Advancement of Colored People that the importation of African Oompa-Loompas into the factory had overtones of slavery. Following the film's release, Dahl defended himself against accusations of racism but found himself sympathising with the NAACP's comments. In 1973, Dahl rewrote them to be white-skinned.

In both editions, despite working in the factory, the Oompa-Loompas insist on maintaining their native clothing: men wear animal skins, women wear leaves, and children wear nothing. One of the places that the Wonkavator passes is an Oompa-Loompa village.

In the 1971 film, they were portrayed by Rudy Borgstaller, George Claydon, Malcolm Dixon, Rusty Goffe, Ismed Hassan, Norman McGlen, Angelo Muscat, Pepe Poupee, Marcus Powell, and Albert Wilkinson.

In the 2005 film, the Oompa-Loompas are all played by Deep Roy and are virtually identical. They wear their tribal clothing during their time in Loompaland, and typical factory worker uniforms in Wonka's factory. Some of the female Oompa-Loompas, like Doris, work in the administration offices. In the remake, Willy Wonka explained to the visitors how the Oompa-Loompas were hired to work in the factory and Wonka even visits Loompaland in a flashback sequence.

In the 2023 film, the Oompa-Loompas are embodied by the solitary Lofty (portrayed by Hugh Grant) who seeks to hunt down Wonka to repay his debt of "precious cocoa beans" taken from his people as seen in a flashback when two Oompa-Loompa guards (portrayed by Ben Howard and Muzz Khan) caught Lofty sleeping on guard duty. When on a boat after Wonka's chocolate store was sabotaged by Mrs. Scrubbit and Bleacher on the Chocolate Cartel's behalf, Lofty does advise Wonka to stand up to them and led him to figure out why Noodle was important to Slugworth. Both of them managed to get off the boat that was rigged to explode. Lofty later saved Wonka and Noodle from the Chocolate Cartel's death trap. After Wonka paid off his debt, he help found Willy Wonka's Chocolate Factory with him when hired to be part of its tasting department. While Grant's portrayal reprised the orange skin and green hair of the 1971 film, both were colored with digital effects rather than make-up or wigs.

1971 Cast members:

Name	Born	Died
Rudy Borgstaller	?	?
George Claydon	4 September 1933	4 October 2001
Malcolm Dixon	1934	9 April 2020
Rusty Goffe	30 October 1948	Still alive
Ismed Hassan	1940	2003
Norman McGlen	17 June 1911	6 May 1976
Angelo Muscat	24 September 1930	10 October 1977
Pepe Poupee	28 July 1946	5 March 2006
Marcus Powell	23 November 1909	1991
Albert Wilkinson	1938	Still alive

=== The Vermicious Knids ===
The Vermicious Knids are a fictional species of amorphous aliens that invade the "Space Hotel USA" in Roald Dahl's Charlie and the Great Glass Elevator.

They are also mentioned in the 1971 feature film adaptation, Willy Wonka & the Chocolate Factory, but only as predators of the Oompa-Loompas alongside the Hornswoggles, the Snozzwhangers, and the Whangdoodles.

In the book, Vermicious Knids are huge, dark, egg-shaped predators who swallow their victims whole, and are capable of surviving and moving at great speed in the vacuum of space. Although normally oviform, they can assume any shape at will, while retaining their native texture and features. They originate (according to Mr. Wonka) on the planet Vermes, a fictional planet located (in dialogue) 184,270,000,000 miles (2.9655×10^{11} kilometres) from Earth (52 times Pluto's distance). In the presence of victims, they cannot resist shaping themselves to spell out the word "SCRAM" (the only Earth word that they know) before they attack. They are stated to be extremely voracious, having devoured entire races that lived on Mars, Venus, the Moon, and many other planets; they only avoid Earth because entering the atmosphere causes them to burn up via atmospheric friction.

In Charlie and the Great Glass Elevator, a swarm of Knids take possession of the new "Space Hotel USA". When the transport capsule brings the staff to the Space Hotel, the Knids consume some of the staff, and the survivors retreat to the capsule. There, the Knids bludgeon the capsule with their own bodies, until its retrorockets and communications are useless; whereupon Wonka, Charlie, and Grandpa Joe connect the capsule to the Elevator, in hope of towing it to Earth. One Knid wraps itself around the Elevator while the others form a chain, intending to draw the Elevator and the capsule away. The Elevator quickly returns to Earth, and the Knids are incinerated (into "shooting Knids") in Earth's atmosphere.

When Nestlé created its interpretation of Wonka's world to sell chocolate bars under the name "Wonka", they released a number of downloadable flash games, wherein Knids seemed to have entered the factory and had the appearance of flying green blobs with single red eyes.

The etymology of the name was not provided by Dahl. Pronunciation of Knid is said in the book to approximate adding a schwa between the "K" and "nid", or in Dahl's words, "K'nid". Cnidaria is the name of the taxonomic phylum containing stinging aquatic invertebrates such as jellyfish and corals, in turn derived from the classical Greek word for nettle, κνίδη. Vermicious is a real word, meaning "worm-like".

The Vermicious Knids are also mentioned in other Dahl stories, including James and the Giant Peach (where the New York City Police Department misidentify Miss Spider as one) and The Minpins.

== Introduced in different adaptations ==
=== Mr. Turkentine ===
Mr. Turkentine
- Willy Wonka & the Chocolate Factory character
- First appearance: Willy Wonka & the Chocolate Factory (1971)
- Created by: Roald Dahl
- Portrayed by: David Battley (1971)
- Voiced by: Sean Schemmel (Tom and Jerry: Willy Wonka and the Chocolate Factory)

In-universe information
- Gender: Male

Mr. Turkentine (portrayed by David Battley) is Charlie Bucket's school teacher and appears in the 1971 film, but not in the book or the 2005 film.

He has an odd sense of humour, which he uses to express knowledge. He asks Charlie to assist him in making a medicine using several scientific elements for the class, but the project is interrupted due to the frantic Golden Ticket search for Willy Wonka. Mr. Turkentine, when hearing the news about the Golden Tickets during the project, dismisses the class and runs out. Later, when it is revealed that all of the tickets have supposedly been found ending with a Paraguayan millionaire, he decides to use Wonka bars as an example to teach his class about percentages. He uses a few students as examples for the class, including Charlie. Charlie, however, reveals that he only opened two Wonka bars during the search and so, to help make it easier for his class, as he reveals that: "Well I can't figure out just two!" decides to pretend that Charlie opened 200.

=== Alberto Minoleta ===
Alberto Minoleta
- Charlie and the Chocolate Factory character
- First appearance: Willy Wonka and the Chocolate Factory (1971)
- Portrayed by: Droopy (voiced by Jeff Bergman in Tom and Jerry: Willy Wonka and the Chocolate Factory)

In-universe information
- Gender: Male

Alberto Minoleta is a Paraguayan gambler that is featured in the 1971 film. His picture was seen on the newspaper claiming that he found the final Golden Ticket. A later newspaper states that the Golden Ticket he had was fake causing the contest to be back on until Charlie Bucket found the final Golden Ticket. Minoleta's picture was that of prominent Nazi official Martin Bormann, who in real life was thought to have escaped to Paraguay. An earlier draft of the script referred to the character as Bormann.

In Tom and Jerry: Willy Wonka and the Chocolate Factory, Alberto Minoleta was portrayed by Droopy. His roles is the same and mentions his arrest. Unlike the other adaptions, Minoleta was later seen out of police custody floating with Tom and Jerry using Fizzy Lifting Drink at the end of the film describing it to be the only way to fly.

Note: His role was based on that of a Russian woman named Charlotte Russe, who appeared in the book, falsely claiming to have found a Golden Ticket, with her character being used for the 2005 film.

=== Dr. Wilbur Wonka ===
Dr Wilbur Wonka
- Charlie and the Chocolate Factory character
- First appearance: Charlie and the Chocolate Factory (2005)
- Created by: John August
- Portrayed by: Christopher Lee

In-universe information
- Gender: Male

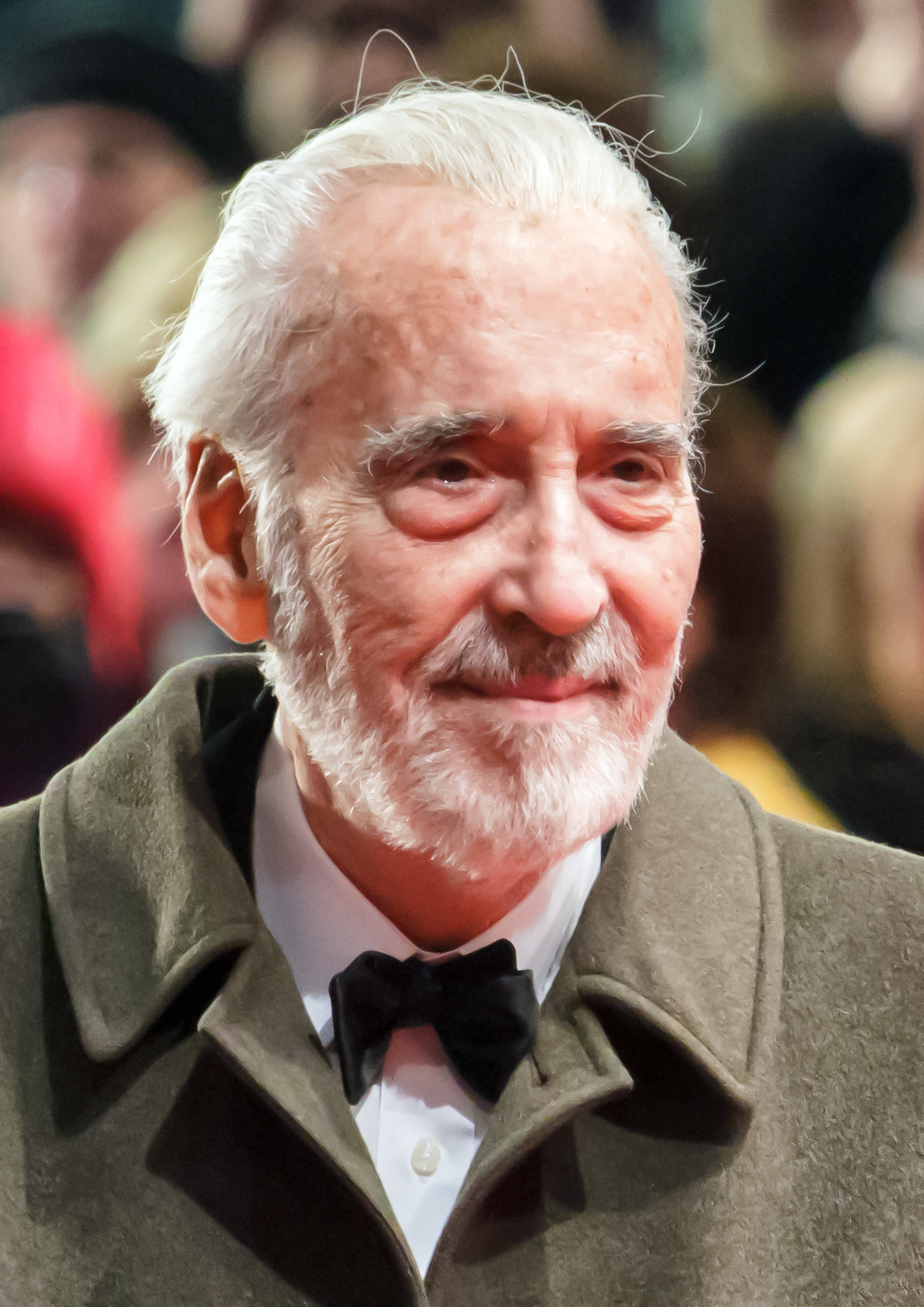
Christopher Lee (pictured in 2013) portrayed Dr Wilbur Wonka in the 2005 film adaptation.

Dr. Wilbur Wonka, D.D.S. (portrayed by Christopher Lee) is the estranged father of Willy Wonka in the 2005 film adaptation.

The town's prized dentist, Wilbur imposed strict rules on his son, going as far as putting him in cramped braces to prevent him from consuming sweets. When Willy announced that he wanted to travel to Switzerland and Bavaria to become a chocolatier (against his father's wishes), Dr Wonka allowed him to leave, but told him that he wouldn't be there when Willy returned. True to his word, Dr Wonka's building was later found to no longer be in its usual spot.

Decades later, the elder Wonka is even revealed to have collected newspaper clippings documenting his son's success when his building was found by Charlie and Willy somewhere in the arctic. When Dr Wonka examines his son's teeth, he recognizes him and they reconcile.

=== Noodle ===
Noodle
- Charlie and the Chocolate Factory character
- First appearance: Wonka (2023)
- Portrayed by: Calah Lane

In-universe information
- Gender: Female

Noodle (portrayed by Calah Lane) is a character in Wonka.

She was depicted as an orphan enslaved to Mrs. Scrubbit who tends to punish her by locking her in the coop as seen when she tries to warn Willy Wonka of the small print. She becomes his ally in helping to establish his own chocolate business which attracts the attention of the Chocolate Cartel and the chief of police. With the rest of the enslaved allying with Wonka, Noodle helps in making his chocolate while helping him become literate. After Mrs. Scrubbit sabotages the edible flowers with Yeti Sweat and different "poisons" and Wonka agrees to Mr. Slugworth's offer to leave the country, Mrs. Scrubbit is given the money to free the enslaved and to keep Noodle in. After Wonka survived a boat explosion alongside Lofty, Noodle is freed as she and Wonka's former co-workers infiltrate the church where the Chocolate Cartel's base of operations is in order to get the ledger that lists their illegal actions. After getting by each obstacle, Willie and Noodle find the hidden ledger only to be confronted by Slugworth, Fickelgruber, and Prodnose. It is then revealed that Slugworth is Noodle's uncle who was left at her doorstep by her mother Dorothy Smith to raise her while she is busy and following the death of Slugworth's brother Zebedee. Slugworth, Fickelgruber, and Prodnose trap Wonka and Noodle in a chocolate mixer as they dump a lot of chocolate from their businesses into it. Luckily for Wonka and Noodle, Lofty rescues them. Because they ate the hoverchocs, Slugworth, Fickelgruber, and Prodnose start to float for a while as Wonka and Noodle use the ledger to expose their illegal activities and those that work for them. Afterwards, Wonka learns where Dorothy Smith lives from Abacus Crunch and Lottie Bell. He proceeds to reunite Noodle with her.

=== Mrs. Wonka ===
Mrs. Wonka
- Charlie and the Chocolate Factory character
- First appearance: Wonka (2023)
- Portrayed by: Sally Hawkins

In-universe information
- Gender: Female

Mrs. Wonka (portrayed by Sally Hawkins) is a character in Wonka.

She taught Willy Wonka how to make chocolate and they planned to open a chocolate shop. When Mrs. Wonka was dying, Willy hoped to see her spirit when he finally opened a chocolate shop. After the first attempt failed because Mrs. Scrubbit on the Chocolate Cartel's behalf spiked the edible plants with Yeti Sweat, Willy finally saw his mother's spirit after the Chocolate Cartel was defeated and he shared parts of his chocolate bar with his allies.

=== Mrs. Scrubbit and Bleacher ===
Mrs. Scrubbit and Bleacher
- Charlie and the Chocolate Factory character
- First appearance: Wonka (2023)
- Portrayed by: Mrs. Scrubbit: Olivia Colman; Bleacher: Tom Davis

In-universe information
- Gender: Mrs. Scrubbit: Female; Bleacher: Male

Mrs. Scrubbit (portrayed by Olivia Colman) and Bleacher (portrayed by Tom Davis) are characters in Wonka.

Mrs. Scrubbit is the laundrette and hotel manager of a hotel. Bleacher is Mrs. Scrubbit's assistant. They make any guest that stay at their hotel sign a lodging contract and not look at the small print. Anyone who can't pay off the bill works below handling all the laundry with their dog keeping an eye on them. Mrs. Scrubbit even throws Noodle into the coop when she disobeys her orders. When Willy Wonka became their latest employer, he secretly began his chocolate-making activities while leading the workers into helping him and having Mrs. Scrubbit's dog run a machine that would help with the laundry. Noodle even fooled Mrs. Scrubbit that Bleacher was from some royalty causing some romance between them. Mr. Slugworth later visited Mrs. Scrubbit to inform them about what Wonka is doing and enlists her and Bleacher into sabotaging his chocolate store. They do that by spiking some of the edible plants with Yeti Sweat and different "poisons" which caused chaos there. After Wonka boarded the boat secretly rigged with explosives as part of the deal with Mr. Slugworth, Mrs. Scrubbit received money from Mr. Slugworth to release the other workers from their debt and to keep Noodle on them. Before being locked in the coop, Noodle reveals that she lied to Mrs. Scrubbit about Bleacher's connection with royalty causing a strain among them. It was later revealed that Mr. Slugworth actually gave a younger Noodle to Mrs. Scrubbit. During the credits, the Oompa Loompa Lofty showed the viewers the footage on what happened to Mrs. Scrubbit and Bleacher. As Mrs. Scrubbit is counting the money that Mr. Slugworth gave her while sorting them into different purchases, Bleacher comes in stating that the Chocolate Cartel has gone down as they work to dispose of the "poisons" used in the Chocolate Cartel's plot by drinking it as the police show up. When the police find Mrs. Scrubbit and Bleacher discolored from the "poisons", Officer Affable has them arrested stating that they are going away for a long time as Bleacher maintains they did nothing wrong. As they are led away, Mrs. Scrubbit and Bleacher briefly kiss again.

=== Abacus Crunch ===
Abacus Crunch
- Charlie and the Chocolate Factory character
- First appearance: Wonka (2023)
- Portrayed by: Jim Carter

In-universe information
- Gender: Male

Abacus Crunch (portrayed by Jim Carter) is a character in Wonka.

Abacus Crunch is a man who went to the city away from his wife and daughter where he started working as an accountant for Mr. Slugworth. This only lasted for a short time when Slugworth fired him upon the discovery of the ledger with all of the Chocolate Cartel's illegal activities. He later ended up enslaved at Mrs. Scrubbit's hotel where he and those with him had to do all the laundry work. Abacus later allied with Wonka in his chocolate-making activities where he counted the money received and even revealed what he knew about Slugworth and his ledger. After Wonka boarded a boat secretly loaded with explosives as part of a deal with Slugworth, Abacus was freed from Mrs. Scrubbit's services. He and his co-workers later assisted Wonka and Noodle in getting into the Chocolate Cartel's lair that involved releasing Abigail the Giraffe into the church where it is located. Abacus was present when the Chocolate Cartel's activities were made known by Wonka and Noodle as he and Wonka's allies release all the chocolate that the Chocolate Cartel withheld into the fountain. He and Lottie Bell later revealed to Wonka and Noodle that they managed to locate Noodle's mother. During the credits, the Oompa Loompa Lofty revealed that Abacus reunited with his family.

=== Piper Benz ===
Piper Benz
- Charlie and the Chocolate Factory character
- First appearance: Wonka (2023)
- Portrayed by: Natasha Rothwell

In-universe information
- Gender: Female

Piper Benz (portrayed by Natasha Rothwell) is a character in Wonka.

Piper Benz is a plumber that was enslaved to Mrs. Scrubbit where she and those with her had to do all the laundry work. She later allied with Wonka in his chocolate-making activities. After Wonka boarded a boat secretly loaded with explosives as part of a deal with Mr. Slugworth, Piper was freed from Mrs. Scrubbit's services. She and her co-workers later assisted Wonka and Noodle in getting into the Chocolate Cartel's lair that involved releasing Abigail the Giraffe into the church where it is located. Piper was present when the Chocolate Cartel's activities were made known by Wonka and Noodle as she and Wonka's allies release all the chocolate that the Chocolate Cartel withheld into the fountain. During the credits, the Oompa Loompa Lofty revealed that Piper reunited with her friends.

=== Lottie Bell ===
Lottie Bell
- Charlie and the Chocolate Factory character
- First appearance: Wonka (2023)
- Portrayed by: Rakhee Thakrar

In-universe information
- Gender: Female

Lottie Bell (portrayed by Rakhee Thakrar) is a character in Wonka.

Lottie Bell is a telephonist that was enslaved to Mrs. Scrubbit where she and those with her had to do all the laundry work. It was claimed by Abacus that she doesn't say much. Lottie and her co-workers later allied with Wonka in his chocolate-making activities where she stated that she didn't talk much as she had nothing to contribute in certain discussions and is mostly a chatterbox on the switchboards. After Wonka boarded a boat secretly loaded with explosives as part of a deal with Mr. Slugworth, Lottie was freed from Mrs. Scrubbit's services. She and her co-workers later assisted Wonka and Noodle in getting into the Chocolate Cartel's lair. After Abigail the Giraffe was unleashed into the church, Lottie operated the switchboards when Father Julius called the zoo to remove Abigail from the church. Lottie later helps the rest of Wonka's allies release all the chocolate that the Chocolate Cartel withheld into the fountain. After the Chocolate Cartel was defeated, Lottie and Abacus Crunch revealed to Wonka and Noodle that they located Noodle's mother as Lottie inquired a lot of people named "D. Smith" before she found the right one. During the credits, the Oompa Loompa Lofty revealed that Lottie returned to her telephonist job.

=== Larry Chucklesworth ===
Larry Chucklesworth
- Charlie and the Chocolate Factory character
- First appearance: Wonka (2023)
- Portrayed by: Rich Fulcher

In-universe information
- Gender: Male

Larry Chucklesworth is a character in Wonka.

Larry Chucklesworth is a struggling comedian with an ex-wife who was enslaved to Mrs. Scrubbit where he and those with him had to all the laundry work. He is also an expert at pulling off underwater voices. Larry and his co-workers later allied with Wonka in his chocolate-making activities. After Wonka boarded a boat secretly loaded with explosives as part of a deal with Mr. Slugworth, Larry was freed from Mrs. Scrubbit's services as he quoted that she and Mr. Bleacher were a terrible audience. He and his co-workers later assisted Wonka and Noodle in getting into the Chocolate Cartel's lair that involved unleashing Abigail the Giraffe into the church where it was located. Larry was present when the Chocolate Cartel's activities were made known by Wonka and Noodle as he and Wonka's allies release all the chocolate that the Chocolate Cartel withheld into the fountain. During the credits, the Oompa Loompa Lofty revealed that Larry did his comedian gig somewhere as part of his comeback. His ex-wife who saw the act was impressed and took him back.

=== Miss Bon Bon ===
Miss Bon Bon
- Charlie and the Chocolate Factory character
- First appearance: Wonka (2023)
- Portrayed by: Freya Parker

In-universe information
- Gender: Female

Miss Bon Bon (portrayed by Freya Parker) is a character in Wonka.

Miss Bon Bon is the secretary of Mr. Slugworth.

=== Chief of Police ===
Chief of Police
- Charlie and the Cholate Factory character
- First appearance: Wonka (2023)
- Portrayed by: Keegan-Michael Key

In-universe information
- Gender: Male

The unnamed chief of police (portrayed by Keegan-Michael Key) is a character in Wonka.

The chief of police is the head of the local police department. What his fellow police officers don't know is that he is secretly in league with the Chocolate Cartel where Mr. Slugworth, Mr. Fickelgruber, and Mr. Prodnose often bribe him with chocolate to satisfy his sweet tooth. When asked to intimidate Willy Wonka, the chief of police wasn't up to it until they bribed him with a lot of chocolate. He then proceeded to shove Wonka's head into the fountain water three times while demanding that he not sell his chocolate, though Wonka had a hard time hearing since he got water in his ears. Then he used his billy club on Wonka offscreen. When Wonka, Noodle, and those enslaved to Ms. Scrubbit start secretly selling chocolate, they worked to avoid the chief of police and the other police officers. Due to his sweet tooth, the chief of police started to become overweight as he reveals the manhole trick to the Chocolate Cartel. He is bribed to have his police officers positioned at each of the manholes as he turns down Officer Affable's concerns on focusing on solving some unsolved crimes. After the edible plants in Wonka's shop was sabotaged by Ms. Scrubbit using Yeti Sweat and different "poisons", the chief of police was present at the shore when Wonka gave in to Slugworth's offer to leave town in exchange for those enslaved to Ms. Scrubbit to be released as he gets a signal from the boat captain that the explosives were secretly planted on the boat. Once Wonka was on the boat and explodes, the Chocolate Cartel use a crane operated by Ms. Bon Bon to load a large box of chocolate onto the chief of police's car. The chief of police later arrived in an obese state with his police officers when Wonka and Noodle got ahold of the ledger and exposed Slugworth, Fickelgruber, and Prodnose's actions. Officer Affable finds the chief of police's name in the ledger detailing those they made business with leading to the chief of police getting arrested.

=== Officer Affable ===
Officer Affable
- Charlie and the Chocolate Factory character
- First appearance: Wonka (2023)
- Portrayed by: Kobna Holdbrook-Smith

In-universe information
- Gender: Male

Officer Affable (portrayed by Kobna Holdbrook-Smith) is a character in Wonka.

Officer Affable is a police officer who works under the chief of police. When the police shut down Wonka's chocolate sale and confiscate his coins, Officer Affable allowed him to keep one coin. Throughout the film, Officer Affable and his fellow police officers assisted the Chief of Police in trying to catch Wonka. Officer Affable's concern about the police focusing on solving the unsolved crimes was turned away by the chief of police. When the Chocolate Cartel's actions were exposed by Wonka and Noodle, Officer Affable finds his boss' name in the ledger many times and has his fellow police officers arrest him. During the credits, the Oompa Loompa Lofty showed Officer Affable leading the arrest of Mrs. Scrubbit and Bleacher where they find them changed by the Yeti Sweat and the different "poisons" that they consumed when attempting to hide the evidence of their involvement with the Chocolate Cartel. As Mrs. Scrubbit and Bleacher are being arrested, Officer Affable states that they will be going away for a long time.

=== Father Julius ===
Father Julius
- Charlie and the Chocolate Factory character
- First appearance: Wonka (2023)
- Portrayed by: Rowan Atkinson

In-universe information
- Gender: Male

Father Julius (portrayed by Rowan Atkinson) is a character in Wonka.

Father Julius is a cleric who is the boss of a group of monks that share his sweet tooth and allow their church to be used as the secret base of the Chocolate Cartel. Any associate of the Chocolate Cartel must pay a chocolate product when making a confession in the confessional booth that serves as the entrance to the Chocolate Cartel's lair. Wonka and his allies worked to get into the Chocolate Cartel's lair starting with Noodle sneaking some acacia mints into Father Julius' pocket and unleashing Abigail the Giraffe into it. This ended up delaying the funeral of Baron von Schmeichelhammer as Father Julius calls the zoo to help remove Abigail. Wonka's allies pose as workers for the zoo in order to get Abigail out of the church so that the funeral can proceed. Mr. Slugworth, Mr. Fickelgruber, and Mr. Prodnose leave him the chocolates they confiscated from Willy Wonka. After they left, Father Julius is confronted by the Oompa-Loompa Lofty who knocks him out with the chocolate jar. When Wonka and Noodle use the ledger to expose the Chocolate Cartel's actions and those who worked for them, it can be assumed that Father Julius and his fellow monks were arrested afterwards.

=== Basil ===
Basil
- Charlie and the Chocolate Factory character
- First appearance: Wonka (2023)
- Portrayed by: Simon Farnaby

In-universe information
- Gender: Male

Basil (portrayed by Simon Farnaby) is a character in Wonka.

Basil is a security guard at the zoo where Abigail the Giraffe lives. To get by him, Wonka gave him a special chocolate that causes him to envision what could've been and even contacted a former classmate named Gwennifer that chemistry class was the best days of their life before passing out. Basil was later contacted by Gwennifer of the same comment before they both pass out. After Wonka and Noodle expose the Chocolate Cartel's actions, Basil was in the crowd as he reunites with Gwennifer.

=== Gwennie ===
Gwennie
- Charlie and the Chocolate Factory character
- First appearance: Wonka (2023)
- Portrayed by: Ellie White

In-universe information
- Gender: Female

Gwennie (portrayed by Ellie White) is a character in Wonka.

Gwennifer is a cleric warrior who guards the underground entrance of the Chocolate Cartel's lair, was considrered the "Keeper of the Keys", and is said to have not seen the light of day. She was first seen letting the Chief of Police into the Chocolate Cartel's lair. When Wonka and Noodle infiltrate the Chocolate Cartel's lair, Wonka left her the same special chocolate that he used on Basil. She called up Basil stating that chemistry class was the best days of their life as she and Basil pass out. After Wonka and Noodle expose the Chocolate Cartel's actions, Gwennifer emerged from the church and reunited with Basil.

=== Dorothy Smith ===
Dorothy Smith
- Charlie and the Chocolate Factory character
- First appearance: Wonka (2023)
- Portrayed by: Tracy Ifeachor

In-universe information
- Gender: Female

Dorothy Smith (portrayed by Tracy Ifeachor) is a character in Wonka.

Dorothy Smith is a librarian who is the mother of Noodle through Zebedee despite not being married to him. After Zebedee died, Dorothy asked Zebedee's brother Mr. Slugworth to watch over a baby Noodle. Slugworth gave Noodle to Mrs. Scrubbit and lied to Dorothy that Noodle died. After the Chocolate Cartel's activities were exposed, Abacus Crunch and Lottie Bell inform Wonka and Noodle that were able to locate Dorothy Smith. Wonka proceeded to reunite Noodle with Dorothy.
