= Minstrelsy =

Minstrelsy may refer to:

- The art of the medieval minstrel
- The 19th-century American minstrel show
