= Michael Böllner =

German former child actor (born 1958)

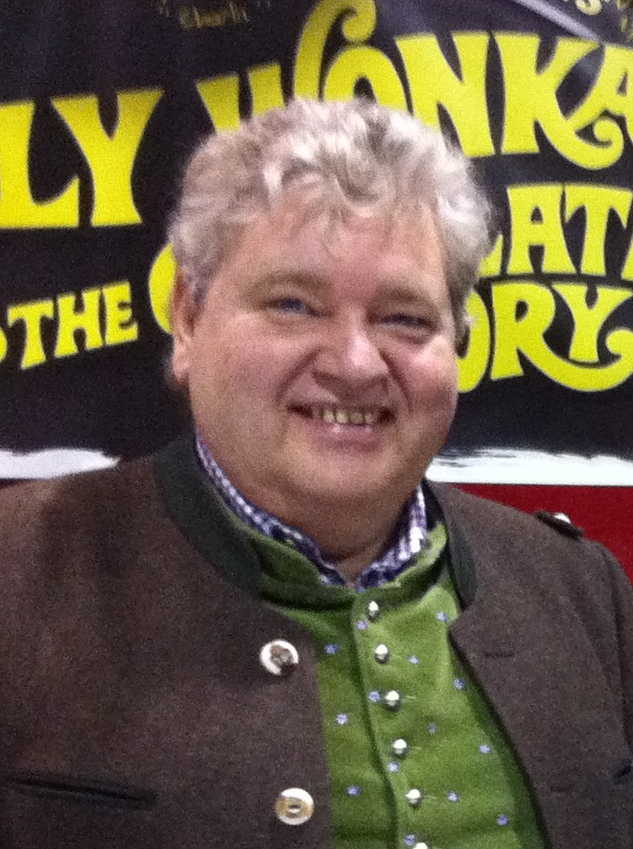
- Böllner in 2011
- Born: 14 September 1958 (age 68); Munich, Bavaria, West Germany
- Occupations: Actor; tax accountant
- Years active: 1970–2015
- Known for: Augustus Gloop in Willy Wonka & the Chocolate Factory

Michael Böllner (born 14 September 1958) is a German tax accountant and former child actor known for playing Augustus Gloop in the 1971 film Willy Wonka & the Chocolate Factory.

== Life and career ==
Born and raised in Munich, West Germany, Böllner was cast for the role of Augustus Gloop in Willy Wonka & the Chocolate Factory, with much of the film being shot in his hometown. Being the only German among the five main child actors, he knew little English during the film's production. Following the completion of Willy Wonka, Böllner had a few minor roles on German television, but his father prioritized education over his acting career. Consequently, Böllner gave up acting and became a tax accountant in Munich. By 2005, he had married and divorced.

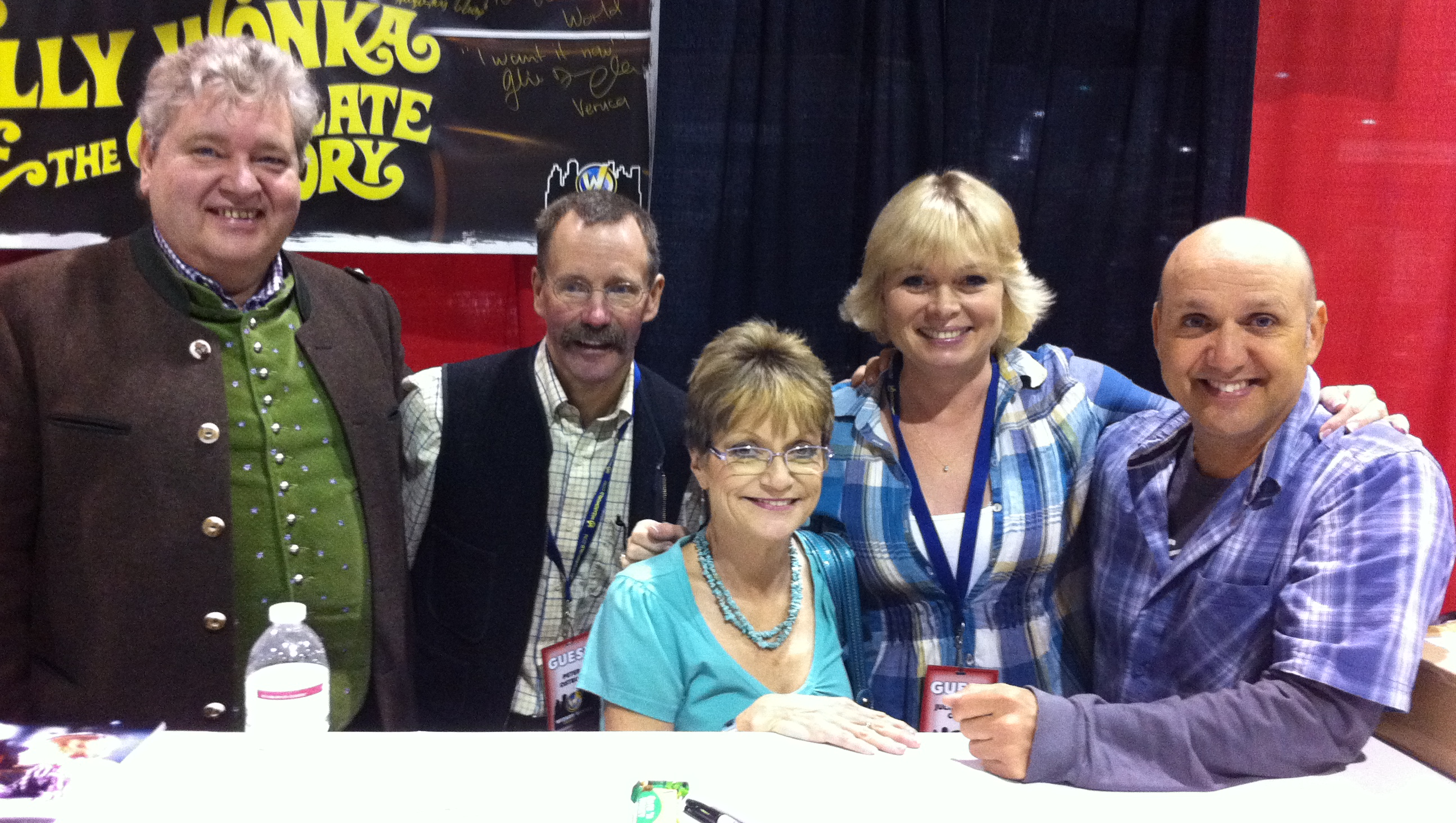
Böllner (far left) in 2011 with the Willy Wonka child cast

Due to Willy Wonka being infrequently screened in Germany, Böllner was largely unaware of its cultural impact until the 1990s, when fellow cast members reconnected with him via a German newspaper advertisement reading "Augustus, Show a Sign". Since then, he has regularly appeared with other cast members at fan conventions. Following the death of Gene Wilder in 2016, Böllner expressed regret about not talking more with him after improving his English skills.

To date, Böllner has not had any film roles besides Willy Wonka. He most recently appeared as himself in a TV show called Bizarre Transmissions from the Bermuda Triangle, which aired in 2015.

In 2023, after publishers removed the term "fat" to describe Augustus Gloop in the Roald Dahl Charlie and the Chocolate Factory book on which Willy Wonka was based, Böllner publicly defended the original text and called the change unnecessary.
