= Phoebe Dahl =

American fashion designer

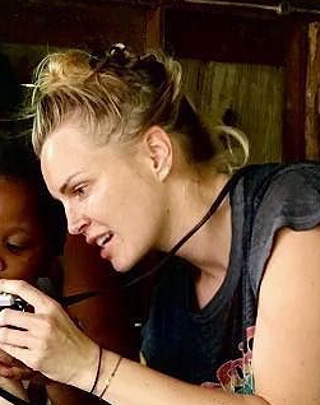
- Dahl in 2016
- Born: Phoebe Patricia Faircloth; 4 November 1988 (age 38); Sacramento, California, U.S.
- Occupations: Fashion designer, philanthropist
- Notable work: Founder of Faircloth & Supply
- Parents: Lucy Dahl; Michael Faircloth
- Relatives: Roald Dahl (grandfather); Patricia Neal (grandmother); Olivia Dahl (aunt); Tessa Dahl (aunt); Theo Dahl (uncle); Ophelia Dahl (aunt); Sophie Dahl (first cousin)

Phoebe Patricia Faircloth (born 4 November 1988), known professionally as Phoebe Dahl, is an American fashion designer.

== Career ==
Dahl studied at the Fashion Institute of Design and Merchandising in Los Angeles and at the London College of Fashion. She began her career in Amsterdam working as an assistant to Dutch fashion designer Jackie Villevoye before returning to Los Angeles in 2013. Dahl founded Faircloth & Supply in late 2012 after a trip to Japan and India. In 2015, Dahl created T-shirt designs for Verve Coffee Roasters. She was awarded "Racked’s 30 Under 30 Rising Designers".

Dahl started her fashion brand working with the nonprofit organization General Welfare Pratisthan. For each item sold, the organization donates two school uniforms, school supplies, and a one-year scholarship to a girl in Nepal. Issues of concern to her include women's empowerment.

== Personal life ==
She is the daughter of British screenwriter Lucy Dahl, and granddaughter of British author Roald Dahl and American actress Patricia Neal.

In 2014, Dahl became engaged to Australian actress Ruby Rose; they ended their relationship in December 2015. In February 2017, Dahl began dating DJ and former model Tatiana de Leon.
