= Nicholas Logsdail =

British art dealer (born 1945)

Nicholas Logsdail OBE
- Born: Christopher Nicholas Roald Logsdail; June 1945 (age 81); Watford, England
- Education: Slade School of Fine Art Bryanston School
- Occupations: Gallery founder and owner
- Known for: Lisson Gallery
- Children: 4
- Relatives: Roald Dahl (maternal uncle); Olivia, Tessa, Theo, Ophelia and Lucy Dahl (maternal first cousins); William Logsdail (paternal great-uncle)

Christopher Nicholas Roald Logsdail (born June 1945) is the founder and co-owner of Lisson Gallery, one of the longest-running international contemporary art galleries in the world.

The gallery has locations on Bell Street and Lisson Grove in west London, two locations on West 24th Street in New York City, and locations on N. Sycamore Avenue in Los Angeles, Huqiu Road in Shanghai, and Jinhang East Road in Beijing.

Lisson Gallery was founded by Logsdail in 1967, and he was joined shortly after by Fiona McLean (d. 2011).

Today, Nicholas' son Alex Logsdail is CEO and co-owner of Lisson Gallery, and another son, Max, is special projects coordinator.

== Early life and education ==
Born in the town of Watford, northwest of London, Logsdail was raised in the village of Great Missenden, Buckinghamshire. He is the child (along with twin sisters Anna and Louise) of John Logsdail and Else Kirsten Logsdail (née Dahl). His mother was born to Norwegian parents in England, & was the sister of author Roald Dahl. Family friend Sir Matthew Smith (painter) first introduced Logsdail to painting when he was seven or eight. Logsdail’s uncle Roald Dahl was also instrumental in his early art education, and he used conversations with his young nephew as a reference for some of his child characters.

When Logsdail was a teenager, he built a treehouse on his family property and lived in it for four years, gaining coverage in the local press. He was educated at Bryanston School, a progressive educational institution, High Wycombe School of Art, City & Guilds of London Art School, and the Slade School of Fine Art, University College London.

== Career ==
Lisson Gallery beginnings and early days

Logsdail, trained as a painter, showed in the Young Contemporaries (now New Contemporaries) exhibition at Tate in 1967. That same year, at the age of 21 and while still attending Slade, Logsdail renovated a derelict building in Bell Street, establishing Lisson Gallery. The first exhibition was in April of that year, featuring works by Terence Ibbott, Derek Jarman, Paul Martin, Keith Milow, and Paul Riley.

In its first year, Lisson Gallery exhibited works by Li Yuan-chia, David Medalla, Mira Schendel, Dom Sylvester Houédard, Lygia Clark, and Yoko Ono.

By 1970, the gallery had staged UK debuts for American artists Donald Judd and Sol LeWitt, establishing Lisson as a peerless supporter of Minimalist and Conceptual Art in the UK. Over the next few years, American artists Robert Mangold and Dan Flavin had inaugural London shows at Lisson Gallery, as did British artist Richard Long (artist), who went on to win the Turner Prize three years later. In the early seventies, Logsdail worked closely with Nicholas Serota when he was director of Modern Art Oxford.

In 1977, Logsdail took 11 British artists including Art & Language, Peter Joseph, Bob Law, Richard Long (artist), and Stephen Willats to New York to show at the Fine Arts Building on Hudson Street in Tribeca. Ten years later, in 1987, Lisson Gallery celebrated its 20-year anniversary, embarking on a project to establish a second space on nearby Bell Street, designed by architect Tony Fretton, which opened its doors in 1991.

Lisson Gallery expansion and artists

Lisson Gallery New York, established by Alex Logsdail, was designed by StudioMDA with Studio Christian Wassmann, and opened its doors in Chelsea, under the High Line, in 2016. In 2017, Lisson celebrated its 50th anniversary with the launch of a major publication featuring every exhibition held at the gallery. In 2019, Lisson expanded into Asia, with the opening of a permanent space in Shanghai. Lisson’s permanent spaces in Beijing and in Los Angeles followed in 2021.

Since its inception, Lisson Gallery has hosted over 500 exhibitions, and currently represents around 80 artists including Marina Abramović, Ai Weiwei, Cory Arcangel, Ryan Gander, Rodney Graham, Anish Kapoor, Otobong Nkanga, Julian Opie, Laure Prouvost, Lucy Raven, Carolee Schneemann, Sean Scully, Lee Ufan, and Yu Hong, among others.

Lisson Gallery regularly participates in global art fairs including Art Basel, Frieze Art Fair, and The European Fine Art Fair (TEFAF). 14 Lisson artists have been nominated for the Turner Prize, five have won.

== Recognition ==
Logsdail is regularly included on lists of influential figures in the art world, including Art Review’s Power 100, and The Guardian’s "Movers and makers: the most powerful people in the art world.” A profile of Logsdail and his son Alex featured in The Art Newspaper in October 2018. On the occasion of Lisson Gallery’s 50th anniversary, Logsdail was interviewed by the Daily Telegraph, and Josh Spero for the Financial Times.

Logsdail was appointed Officer of the Order of the British Empire (OBE) in the 2017 New Year Honours for services to the arts.

== Personal life ==
Logsdail has three sons and a daughter (Rory, Alex, Max, Kitty) from two marriages.
