= Ophelia Dahl =

British-American activist (born 1964)

- Born: Ophelia Magdalena Dahl; 12 May 1964 (age 62); Oxford, England
- Education: Wellesley College
- Occupations: Social justice, health care advocate
- Spouse: Lisa Frantzis
- Children: 1
- Parents: Roald Dahl; Patricia Neal
- Relatives: Olivia Dahl (sister); Tessa Dahl (sister); Theo Dahl (brother); Lucy Dahl (sister); Sophie Dahl (niece); Phoebe Dahl (niece); Nicholas Logsdail (first cousin)

Ophelia Magdalena Dahl (born 12 May 1964) is a British-American social justice and health care advocate. She co-founded Partners In Health (PIH), a Boston, Massachusetts-based non-profit health care organization dedicated to providing a "preferential option for the poor." She served as executive director for 16 years, and has since chaired its board of directors.

As a co-founder and key member of the PIH team, Dahl was featured prominently in Mountains Beyond Mountains: The Quest of Dr. Paul Farmer, a Man Who Would Cure the World, Tracy Kidder's book describing the work of the organization and the life of Farmer. In December 2006, Dahl and Farmer received the Union Medal from Union Theological Seminary in New York. Dahl and the Partners in Health team are featured in the 2017 documentary film Bending The Arc. In 2024, she was listed as one of the 100 most influential people in the world by TIME.

== Career ==
In 1983, Dahl first encountered Paul Farmer, the future co-founder of PIH, as an eighteen-year-old volunteer in Haiti. Dahl served as executive director of PIH from 2001 to 2005, and as of 2020 chairs its board of directors. The organisation continues to build health care systems and raise standards in global health in remote areas of the world.

Since the development of PIH in 1987, the organisation has expanded its health care services around the planet. Under Dahl's leadership, PIH is strengthening the public health system for over 800,000 people in Rwanda. In Malawi, Mexico, Russia, and Lesotho, PIH works with the countries' respective ministries of health to fight diseases in certain rural areas. PIH provides critical health care services through programs for cancer, chronic diseases, cholera, HIV/AIDS, surgery, women's health, child health, community health workers, mental health, and tuberculosis. PIH works in more than 60 hospital centers around the world, with more than 12,000 colleagues involved.

In 2011, Dahl was named by the Boston Globe as one of the three Bostonians of the Year alongside Paul Farmer and a senior member of Partners in Health, Louise Ivers, due to the charity's response to the 2010 Haiti earthquake. She was selected by Social Capital Inc. (SCI) as a recipient of the 2011 SCI Idealist Award. In 2013, Dahl was a distinguished speaker at the Madeleine Korbel Albright Institute for Global Affairs.

In 2019, she was awarded an honorary Doctor of Laws degree by Williams College.

== Personal life ==
Dahl was born on 12 May 1964, in Oxford, United Kingdom. She is the second-youngest child of actress Patricia Neal and author Roald Dahl. Dahl contributed to the 2003 book The Roald Dahl Treasury, a collection of her father's stories, memoirs, letters and poetry. She is writing a memoir of her father. She is a trustee and vice president of the Roald Dahl Museum and Story Centre, a registered charity with the mission of "telling Roald Dahl's life story, to care for his archive and to promote a love of creative writing in everyone." She also is the chair of Dahl & Dahl LLP, which manages her father's literary estate.

In 1994, Dahl graduated from Wellesley College as a Davis Scholar and delivered Wellesley's 2006 commencement address.

Dahl has one son with her wife, Lisa Frantzis.
