= Olivia Dahl =

Daughter of Roald Dahl (1955–1962)

- Born: Olivia Twenty Dahl; 20 April 1955; Yorkville, Manhattan, New York City, U.S.
- Died: 17 November 1962 (aged 7); Aylesbury, Buckinghamshire, England
- Cause of death: Encephalitis due to measles
- Parents: Roald Dahl; Patricia Neal
- Relatives: Tessa Dahl (sister); Theo Dahl (brother); Ophelia Dahl (sister); Lucy Dahl (sister); Sophie Dahl (niece); Phoebe Dahl (niece); Nicholas Logsdail (first cousin)

Olivia Twenty Dahl (20 April 1955 – 17 November 1962) was the oldest child of British author Roald Dahl and American actress Patricia Neal. She died at the age of seven from encephalitis caused by measles, before a vaccine against the disease had been developed. Roald Dahl's books James and the Giant Peach (1961) and The BFG (1982) were dedicated to Olivia. As a result of her death, her father Roald became an advocate for vaccination and wrote the pamphlet "Measles: A Dangerous Illness" in 1988.

== Life ==
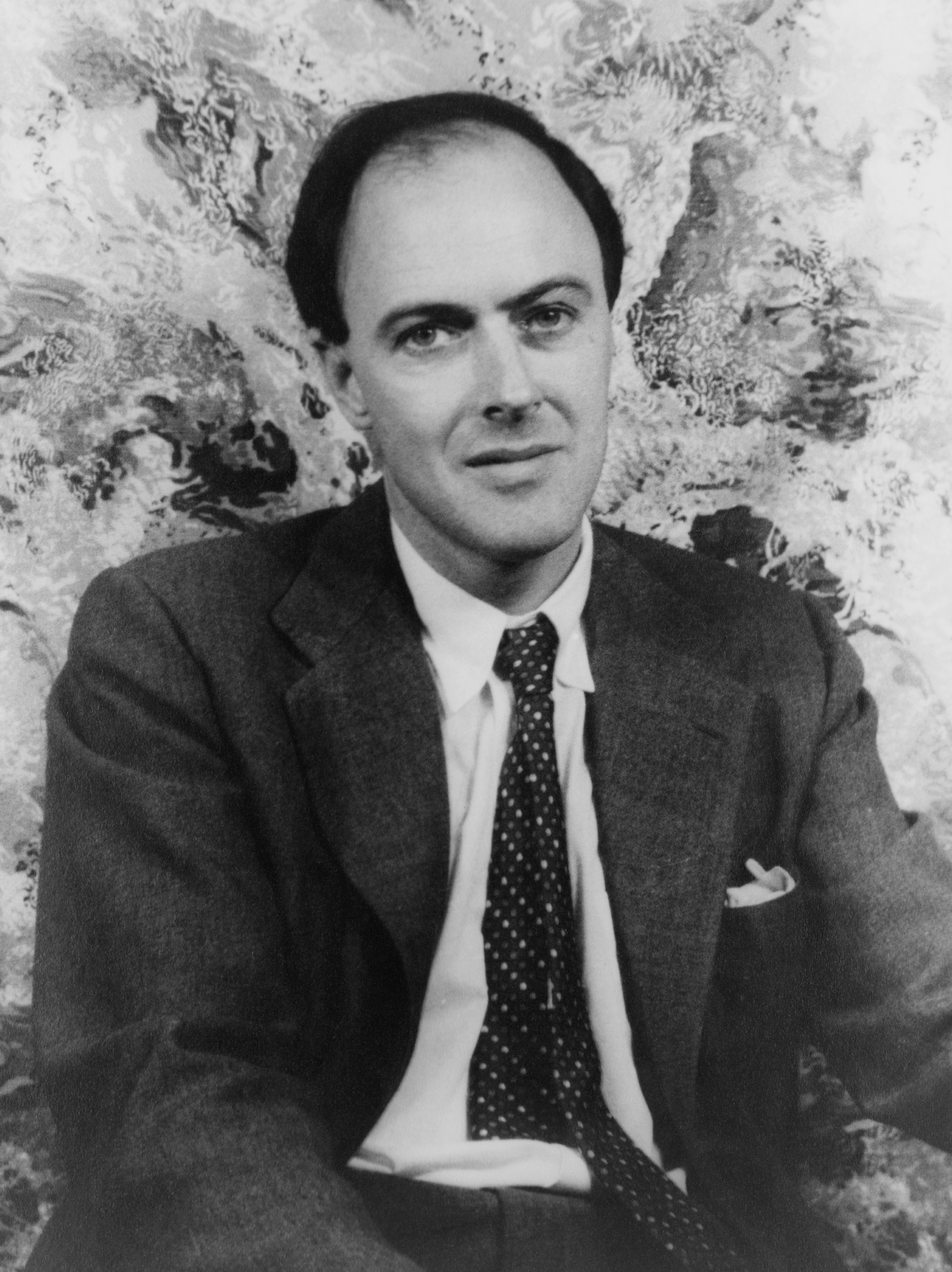
Roald Dahl in 1954, the year before Olivia's birth

Dahl was born on 20 April 1955 at Doctors Hospital, Yorkville, Manhattan New York City, and grew up in the Buckinghamshire village of Great Missenden. She was named for Olivia, the heroine of William Shakespeare's Twelfth Night, a favorite play of her mother's. Her middle name, Twenty, originated from the date of her birth, and the fact that her father had $20 in his pocket when he saw her in the hospital for the first time. Neal "struggled" with Olivia shortly after her birth but found her behavior transformed after spending a few weeks with her paternal aunt, Elsie Logsdail. Roald Dahl constructed his writing hut in the orchard of the couple's Gipsy House for peace and quiet to write after her birth.

Olivia came home from her school, Godstowe Preparatory School, in November 1962 with a note informing her parents of an outbreak of measles. Neal contacted her brother-in-law, Ashley Miles, who sent them gamma globulin, then common in the United States, to boost children's immunity against measles. Miles only provided a small amount, which the Dahls used for their son, Theo. Neal recalled in her autobiography, As I Am, that Miles said "Let the girls get measles… It will be good for them". Olivia subsequently contracted measles, and had a mild fever for a few days before suffering convulsions after growing increasingly lethargic. She quickly became unconscious and was rushed to Stoke Mandeville Hospital where she died the next day.

Neal recalled that a doctor rang to abruptly tell her that Olivia was dead, and she "couldn't believe how cold he was". Neal later regretted not seeing Olivia after her death, having been persuaded not to by her sisters-in-law. According to Neal, her husband "really almost went crazy" with Neal keeping the family together for the sake of their two other children. Neal's grief was helped by talking about Olivia, whereas Roald kept silent about her until his own death in 1990. Olivia was survived by her siblings Theo (born 1960) and Tessa (born 1957). The Dahls' fourth and fifth children, Ophelia and Lucy, were born in 1964 and 1965 respectively. Roald wrote an account of Olivia's death in a notebook which he kept in a drawer of his writing hut; it was discovered after his death 28 years later.

Olivia was buried in the churchyard of St John the Baptist in Little Missenden. Roald constructed a rock garden on her grave.

== Legacy ==
Roald Dahl became increasingly depressed and withdrawn after Olivia's death, spending hours at her grave in silence. His grief affected his relationship with his surviving children and he suffered from depression.

He later became a vaccination advocate, writing an account of Olivia's death in a 1986 pamphlet titled "Measles: A Dangerous Illness" for the Sandwell Health Authority. Dahl wrote:

As the illness took its usual course I can remember reading to her often in bed and not feeling particularly alarmed about it. Then one morning, when she was well on the road to recovery, I was sitting on her bed showing her how to fashion little animals out of coloured pipe cleaners, and when it came to her turn to make one herself, I noticed that her fingers and her mind were not working together and she couldn't do anything. "Are you feeling all right?", I asked her. "I feel all sleepy", she said. In an hour, she was unconscious. In twelve hours she was dead. … I was unable to do that for Olivia in 1962 because in those days a reliable measles vaccine had not been discovered.

Dahl wrote in the pamphlet, "Today a good and safe vaccine is available to every family and all you have to do is to ask your doctor to administer it". In a 1997 interview Neal recalled the suddenness of Olivia's death, which occurred less than a week after contracting measles. Olivia's sister, Lucy, interviewed in 2015 by CBS, stated that her father did not understand why people chose not to vaccinate their children against measles. In Dahl's public letter, he wrote that it is "'almost a crime' for some parents not to immunize their children". "I do agree with that", Lucy states; "I think that it is a crime".

In tribute to her daughter, Neal donated a silver cup to Olivia's school for the best high jumper and insisted that the name of her character, Olivia Walton, that she played in The Waltons television film, The Homecoming: A Christmas Story, be kept as Olivia, and not changed to Mary as the producers wished.

Roald Dahl donated a wooden statue of Saint Catherine to the Church of St John the Baptist in Little Missenden in memory of Olivia after the original was stolen from the church. Dahl's statue was later also stolen and replaced by a replica. He also dedicated his children's novels James and the Giant Peach (1961), Fantastic Mr Fox (1970), and The BFG (1982) to Olivia. The BFG was published on the twentieth anniversary of her death. (Note: "Measles: A Dangerous Illness", hence the source cited here, only lists James and the Giant Peach and The BFG as books dedicated to Olivia. Roald Dahl did, however, also dedicate Fantastic Mr Fox to Olivia. Also, "Measles: A Dangerous Illness" only lists Olivia as a dedicatee for James and the Giant Peach. However, the dedication page of James and the Giant Peach, clearly lists both Olivia and her sister Tessa as dedicatees.)

Patricia Neal named the Abbey of Regina Laudis' outdoor theater building The Gary-The Olivia in honor of Gary Cooper and her daughter Olivia.

The story of Olivia's death and how Neal and Dahl coped with the tragedy was dramatized in 2020 as a British made-for-TV film, To Olivia.

== Bibliography ==
- Sturrock, Donald (2011). Storyteller: The Authorized Biography of Roald Dahl. Simon and Schuster. ISBN 978-1-4391-8976-4.
