= Logsdail =

Logsdail is a surname. Notable people with the surname include:

- Leonard Logsdail (born 1950), British tailor
- Nicholas Logsdail (born 1945), British art dealer
- William Logsdail (1859–1944), English artist
