= Lucy Dahl =

British screenwriter (born 1965)

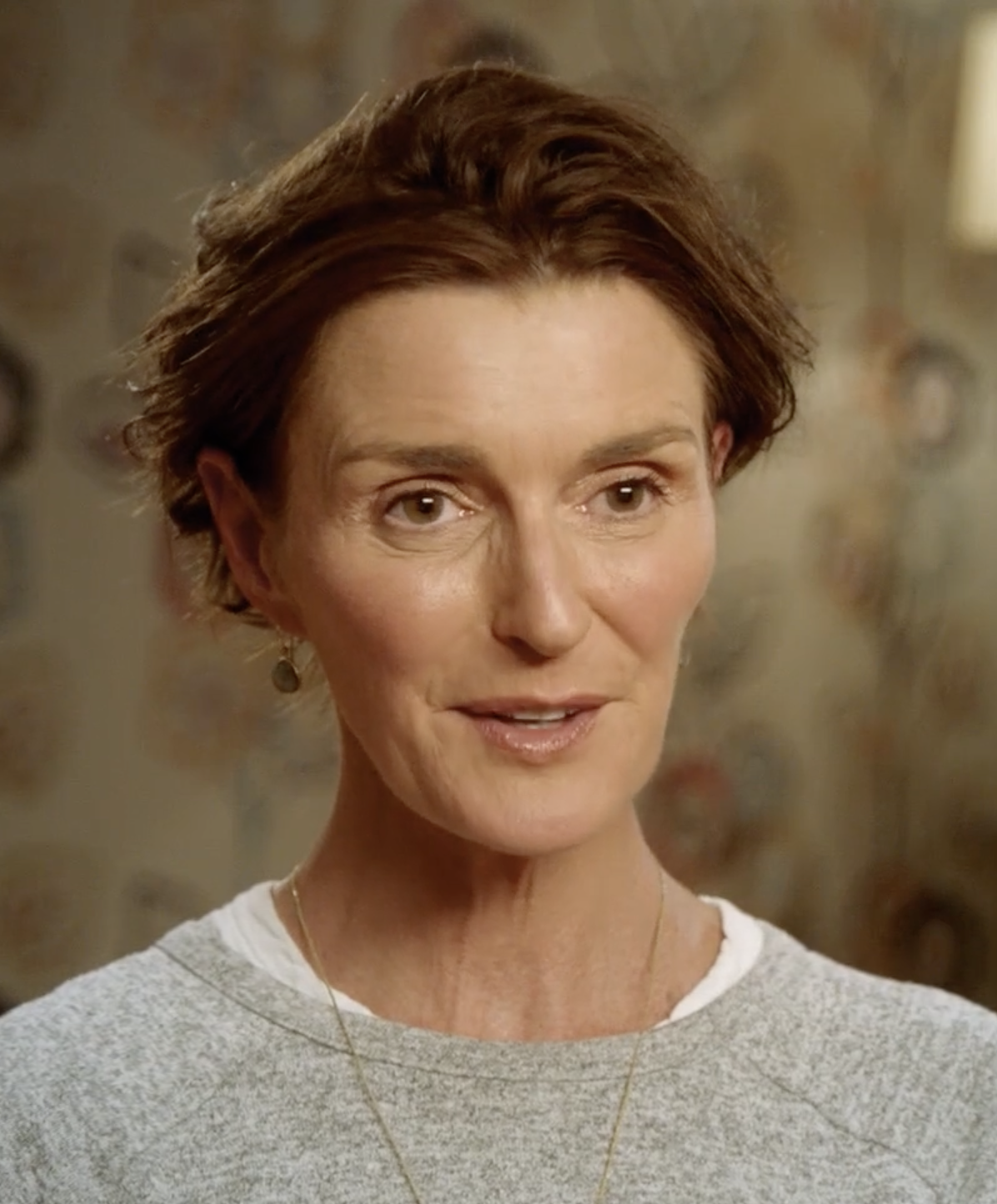
- Dahl in 2016
- Born: Lucy Neal Dahl; 4 August 1965 (age 61); Oxford, England, UK
- Occupation: Screenwriter
- Years active: 2003–present
- Notable work: Writer of Wild Child
- Spouses: David Michael Faircloth (m. 1987; div. 1991); John LaViolette (m. 2002; div. 2016)
- Children: 2, including Phoebe Dahl
- Parents: Roald Dahl; Patricia Neal
- Relatives: Olivia Dahl (sister); Tessa Dahl (sister); Theo Dahl (brother); Ophelia Dahl (sister); Sophie Dahl (niece); Nicholas Logsdail (first cousin)

Lucy Neal Dahl (born 4 August 1965) is a British screenwriter. She is one of the daughters of British author Roald Dahl and American actress Patricia Neal.

== Career ==
Dahl wrote the screenplay for Wild Child based on her own experience at the independent school Abbot's Hill in Hertfordshire, and the experiences of her daughters growing up in LA. She also served as a consultant on the 2005 film adaptation of Charlie and the Chocolate Factory, based on her father's book of the same name. She is also a content contributor to the online food and wine magazine Zester Daily.

== Personal life ==
Dahl was born in Oxford. She has been married twice. She married first, in 1987, David Michael Faircloth, with whom she has two daughters, Phoebe Dahl (born 4 November 1988) and Chloe Michaela Dahl (born 12 September 1990). The couple divorced on 29 December 1992. Dahl's second marriage was in 2002, to John LaViolette. They divorced in 2016.
