= Julian Holloway =

English actor (1944–2025)

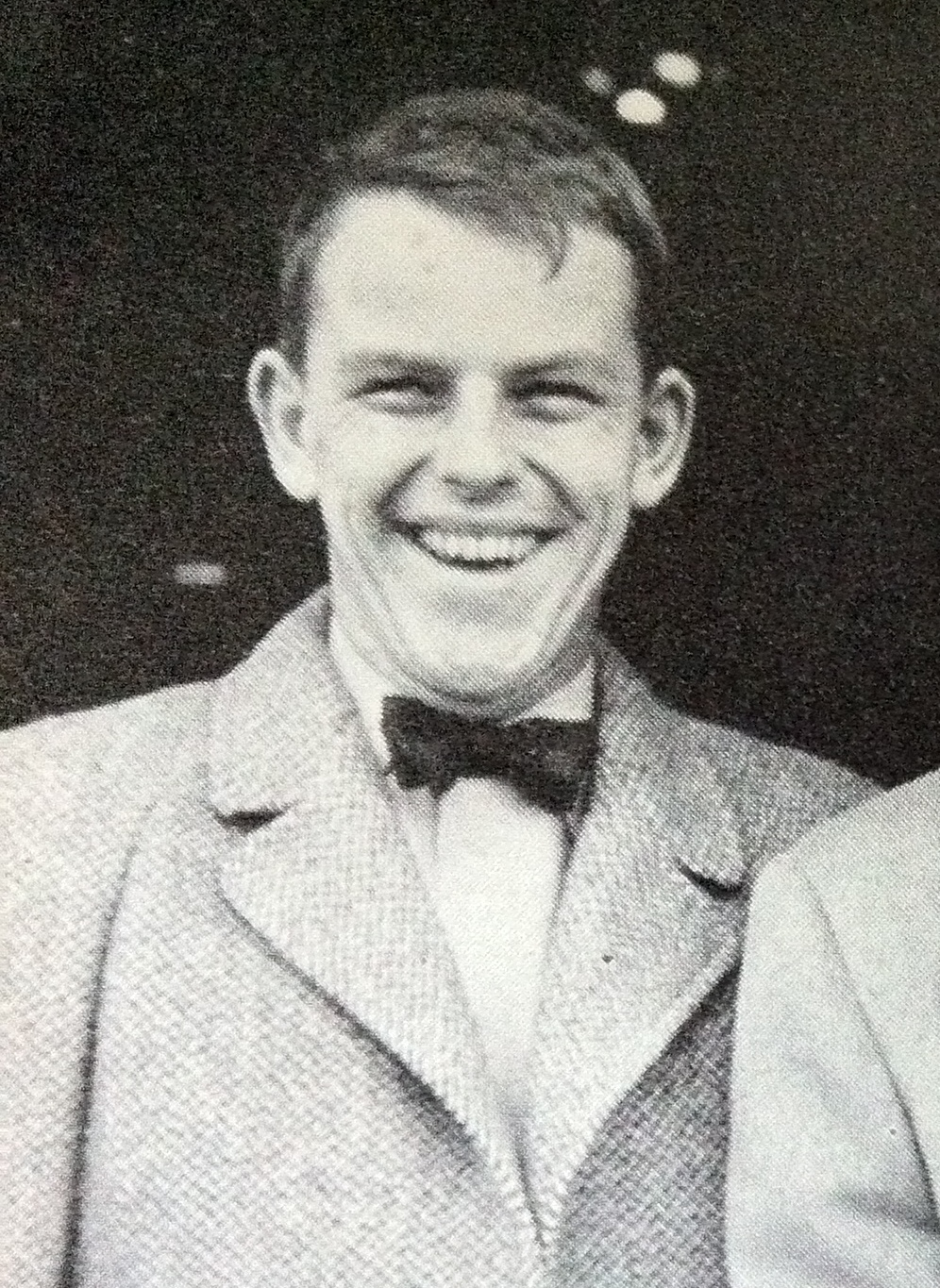
- Holloway in 1962
- Born: Julian Robert Stanley Holloway; 24 June 1944; Watlington, Oxfordshire, England
- Died: 16 February 2025 (aged 80); Bournemouth, Dorset, England
- Occupation: Actor
- Years active: 1961–2020
- Spouses: Zena Walker (m. 1971, divorced) Debbie Wheeler (m. 1991; div. 1996)
- Partner: Tessa Dahl (1976)
- Children: Sophie Dahl
- Parents: Stanley Holloway (father); Violet Lane (mother)

Julian Robert Stanley Holloway (24 June 1944 – 16 February 2025) was an English actor.

== Early life ==
Holloway was born in Watlington, Oxfordshire, England on 24 June 1944, as the son of Stanley Holloway and his wife Violet Lane. He was educated at Ludgrove School, Harrow School, and the Royal Academy of Dramatic Art, graduating in 1963.

== Career ==
In the 1962–63 television season of Our Man Higgins, Holloway was cast in his first major acting role as Quentin in four episodes. He became a mainstay of the Carry On film franchise, appearing in eight films between 1967 and 1976, as well as one of the Carry On Christmas television specials.

In the 1970s British police drama The Sweeney episode Big Spender, Holloway appeared as John Smith, the brains of an organized crime family who involve themselves with two dishonest employees of a car park company in an elaborate fraud. His other television credits included the Uncle Silas television dramatisations, Elizabeth R, Remember WENN, Whatever Happened to the Likely Lads?, Beverly Hills, 90210, Minder, The Professionals, The New Avengers, Z-Cars, The World of Wodehouse, and the Doctor Who story Survival in 1989. His films included Young Winston (1972), Porridge (1979), The Great Rock 'n' Roll Swindle (1980), A Christmas Carol (2009) and The Rum Diary (2011).

Holloway developed a reputation as a successful voice artist / vocal artist, mainly in the United States. In 1991, he performed the role of Captain Zed in Captain Zed and the Zee Zone and as Bradford Milbanks in James Bond Jr.. He also voiced Siegfried Fischbacher in the first season of Father of the Pride (2004), Prime Minister Almec in several episodes of Star Wars: The Clone Wars (2008–2020), and Odlaw in Where's Waldo? (1991 series). Holloway also performed as a vocal artist for video games including Pirates of the Caribbean: At World's End and Medal of Honor: European Assault. He provided the voice for Death in the Cartoon Network animated series Regular Show (2010–2017).

== Personal life and death ==
In 1971, Holloway married Zena Walker, but divorced soon afterwards. In 1976, he had a brief relationship with Tessa Dahl, daughter of Patricia Neal and Roald Dahl. The relationship produced one daughter, the author and former model Sophie Dahl, who was born the following year. In 1991, he met and married voice-over artist and actress Debbie Wheeler. The marriage ended in divorce in 1996.

Holloway was a relative of the English architect and scenic designer Oliver Percy Bernard.

Holloway died from a lung infection in Bournemouth, Dorset, on 16 February 2025, at the age of 80.

== Filmography ==
=== Film ===
| Year | Title | Role | Notes |
|---|---|---|---|
| 1961 | Dentist on the Job | Man on Phone in Factory | uncredited |
| 1963 | Five to One | Sergeant Jenkins | |
| 1964 | Nothing But the Best | Bank Assistant | uncredited |
| 1964 | A Hard Day's Night | Adrian | uncredited |
| 1965 | The Knack ...and How to Get It | Guardsman | uncredited |
| 1965 | The Pleasure Girls | Hanger-on | |
| 1965 | Catch Us If You Can | Assistant Director | |
| 1967 | The Jokers | Man at Party | |
| 1967 | Follow That Camel | Ticket Collector | |
| 1967 | Carry On Doctor | Simmons | |
| 1967 | I'll Never Forget What's'isname | Young Man in Disco | uncredited |
| 1968 | Carry On Up the Khyber | Major Shorthouse | |
| 1969 | Hostile Witness | Percy | |
| 1969 | The Last Shot You Hear | Brash Young Man | |
| 1969 | Carry On Camping | Jim Tanner | |
| 1970 | Scream and Scream Again | Detective Constable Griffin | |
| 1970 | Carry On Loving | Adrian | |
| 1970 | Ryan's Daughter | Major Doryan | voice, uncredited |
| 1971 | Carry On Henry | Sir Thomas | |
| 1971 | Carry On at Your Convenience | Roger | uncredited |
| 1972 | The Spy's Wife | Man | |
| 1972 | Young Winston | Captain Baker | |
| 1974 | Captain Kronos – Vampire Hunter | Kronos | voice, uncredited |
| 1974 | The Stud | Spencer | |
| 1975 | The Hostages | Man | |
| 1975 | Naughty Girls | Narrator/Journalist | voice, uncredited |
| 1976 | Carry On England | Major Butcher | |
| 1978 | Sammy's Super T-Shirt | Mr. Trotter | |
| 1979 | Porridge | Bainbridge | |
| 1980 | The Great Rock 'n' Roll Swindle | Man | |
| 1980 | Rough Cut | Ronnie Taylor | |
| 1983 | The Scarlet and the Black | Alfred West | |
| 1990 | A Season of Giants | Aldovrandi | |
| 1992 | Grass Roots | Elton Hunter | |
| 1993 | Torch Song | Albert | |
| 2009 | A Christmas Carol | Fat Cook/Portly Gentleman/Businessman | voice |
| 2011 | The Rum Diary | Wolsley | |

=== Television ===
| Year | Title | Role | Notes |
|---|---|---|---|
| 1961 | The Avengers | Circus Hand | Episode: "Tunnel of Fear" |
| 1962 | Fair Exchange | Alfred Mason | 2 episodes |
| 1962-1963 | Our Man Higgins | Quentin | 4 episodes |
| 1963 | Our Man at St. Mark's | Mike Daniels | Episode: "A Joyful Noise" |
| 1963 | The Edgar Wallace Mystery Theatre | Sergeant Jenkins | Episode: "Five to One" |
| 1964 | First Night | Policeman | Episode: "Stray Cats and Empty Bottles" |
| 1964 | The Saint | Waiter | Episode: "Luella" |
| 1964 | The Valiant Varneys | Various | Episode: #1.8 |
| 1964 | Gideon's Way | Jim Richards | Episode: "State Visit" |
| 1966 | Pardon the Expression | Norman Burton | 3 episodes |
| 1966 | King of the River | Mick | Episode: "Keeping the Old Spirit Alive" |
| 1967 | Comedy Playhouse | Charlie | Episode: "A Spanner in the Works" |
| 1967 | The World of Wooster | Blair Eggleston | Episode: "Jeeves and the Greasy Bird" |
| 1967 | The Informer | Det. Con. Marston | Episode: "Where There's Muck, There's Money" |
| 1967 | The World of Wooster | Freddie Bullivant | Episode: "Jeeves and the Fixing of Freddie" |
| 1967 | ITV Play of the Week | Thomas | Episode: "Top of the Ladder" |
| 1968 | City '68 | Derek Jackson | Episode: "A Question of Priorities" |
| 1968 | Ukridge | Corky | All 7 episodes |
| 1969 | The Liver Birds | Tony | Episode: "Aristocracy and Crime" |
| 1970 | Parkin's Patch | PC Burton | Episode: "The Spider's Web" |
| 1970 | NBC Experiment in Television | Lord Albert | Episode: "The Engagement" |
| 1970 | W. Somerset Maugham | Jack Carr | Episode: "Flotsam and Jetsam" |
| 1970 | Menace | Peter Lovell | Episode: "Good Morning, Yesterday!" |
| 1970–1976 | Play for Today | Jake Summers/John/Dennis Saunders | 3 episodes |
| 1971 | Elizabeth R | de Noailles | Episode: "The Lion's Cub" |
| 1971 | Take Three Girls | Gordon | Episode: "Kitsch, or Protocols in a Chinese Laundry" |
| 1972 | The Shadow of the Tower | Earl of Surrey | 2 episodes |
| 1972 | The Man from Haven | Guy Western | Episode: #1.1 |
| 1972 | The Incredible Robert Baldick: Never Come Night | Thomas Wingham | TV film |
| 1972 | Dead of Night | Sandy | Episode: "A Woman Sobbing" |
| 1973 | The Edwardians | Lord Brooks | Episode: "Daisy" |
| 1973 | Conjugal Rights | Alan | 3 episodes |
| 1973, 1974 | Whatever Happened to the Likely Lads? | Alan Boyle | 2 episodes |
| 1973 | Harriet's Back in Town | Gerald Winston | 4 episodes |
| 1973 | Ooh La La! | Etienne | Episode: "Keep an Eye on Amélie" |
| 1973 | Bowler | Hartley | Episode: "Come Round Any Old Time" |
| 1973 | Black and Blue | Robinson | Episode: "Secrets" |
| 1973 | Helen: A Woman of Today | Michael | 2 episodes |
| 1973 | Marked Personal | Ray Merton | 2 episodes |
| 1973 | Carry On Christmas | Captain Rhodes | TV film |
| 1974 | BBC Play of the Month | Algernon Moncrieff | Episode: "The Importance of Being Earnest" |
| 1974 | Bedtime Stories | Hale Patterson | Episode: "The Snow Queen" |
| 1974 | Sprout | John Russell | TV film |
| 1974 | Wodehouse Playhouse | Archibald Mulliner | Episode: "The Reverend Wooing of Archibald" |
| 1974 | Warship | O'Morra | Episode: "Who Runs Across the Sea" |
| 1975 | Centre Play | Francis | Episode: "Snooker" |
| 1975 | Z-Cars | Johnny Pearson | Episode: "Incitement" |
| 1975 | The Sweeney | John Smith | Episode: "Big Spender" |
| 1975 | Public Eye | Jeremy Fallows | Episode: "Unlucky for Some" |
| 1975 | Wodehouse Playhouse | Freddie Fitch-Fitch | Episode: "Romance at Droitgate Spa" |
| 1975 | Ten from the Twenties | Peter Wargrave | Episode: "An Adventure in Bed" |
| 1975–1977 | The Punch Review | Various | 6 episodes |
| 1976 | The New Avengers | Charles Thornton | Episode: "Gnaws" |
| 1977 | Jubilee | Ken Howard | Episode: "Street Party" |
| 1977 | Seven Faces of Woman | Trevor | Episode: "She: A Girl in Gold Shoes" |
| 1978 | Crown Court | John Millet | Episode: "Meeting Place: Part 1" |
| 1978 | BBC2 Play of the Week | Grinling | Episode: "Flayed" |
| 1978 | Angels | Peter Long | Episode: "Casualties" |
| 1978 | The Professionals | Harvey | Episode: "First Night" |
| 1978 | A Horseman Riding By | Captain Lane-Phelps | Episode: "1915: Death of a Hero" |
| 1979 | Telford's Change | Simon | Episode: "The Philistines Of Sussex/Situation Vacant" |
| 1979 | Rebecca | Jack Favell | 2 episodes |
| 1980 | Keep It in the Family | Dick Mitchell | Episode: "A Friend in Need" |
| 1981 | Plays for Pleasure | Lawrence | Episode: "Cupid's Darts" |
| 1981 | Misfits | Vernon Wood | 2 episodes |
| 1982 | Minder | Matthews | Episode: "You Need Hands" |
| 1982 | Nancy Astor | Harry Cust | Episode: "The Passenger on the Ocean Liner" |
| 1983 | Hallelujah! | Harry Beasley | Episode: "Repentance" |
| 1983 | BBC Play of the Month | Sir Chichester Frayne | Episode: "The Gay Lord Quex" |
| 1983 | Give Us a Break | Dave Nelson | 2 episodes |
| 1984 | Ellis Island | Florenz Ziegfeld | 2 episodes |
| 1986 | Tall Tales & Legends | Mr. Yorkshire | Episode: "My Darlin' Clementine" |
| 1986 | If Tomorrow Comes | Trevor | 2 episodes |
| 1987 | The Bill | DCI Fairfax | Episode: "Double Trouble" |
| 1989 | The Endless Game | Waddington | All 2 episodes |
| 1989 | Doctor Who | Paterson | Serial: Survival |
| 1990 | The Chief | Sir Ian Harnett MP | 4 episodes |
| 1991 | Rumpole of the Bailey | Howard Swainton | Episode: "Rumpole at Sea" |
| 1991 | Where's Wally? | Odlaw | Voice; All 13 episodes |
| 1991 | James Bond Jr. | Bradford Milbanks, Dr. No, Dr. Derange, Baron Von Skarin, Various | Voice; 55 episodes |
| 1991–1992 | Captain Zed and the Zee Zone | Captain Zed | All 26 episodes |
| 1991–1992 | The Legend of Prince Valiant | Derek, Victim, Spy | Voice; 3 episodes |
| 1992 | Beverly Hills, 90210 | Back Story Narrator | Episode: "The Back Story" |
| 1993 | Casualty | Jim | Episode: "No Cause for Concern" |
| 1995 | The Vet | Peter McMahon | Episode: "Relative Values" |
| 1996–1997 | Remember WENN | Mr. Winthrop, Ricotti | 3 episodes |
| 2001–2003 | My Uncle Silas | Uncle George | 3 episodes |
| 2002 | Dan Dare: Pilot of the Future | Digby | Voice; All 26 episodes |
| 2003 | Wilde Stories: The Nightingale and the Rose | Professor | Voice; TV film |
| 2004–2005 | Father of the Pride | Siegfried Fischbacher | Voice; 14 episodes |
| 2010–2020 | Star Wars: The Clone Wars | Prime Minister Almec, Admiral Kilian | Voice; 8 episodes |
| 2011–2017 | Regular Show | Death, Various | Voice; 5 episodes |
| 2019 | Summer of Rockets | Mr. Richardson | 2 episodes; final role |

=== Video games ===
| Year | Title | Role | Notes |
|---|---|---|---|
| 2003 | Onimusha Blade Warriors | Ekei Ankokuji | Voice |

== Sources ==
- Holloway, Stanley; Richards, Dick (1967). Wiv a little bit o' luck: The life story of Stanley Holloway. London: Frewin. OCLC 3647363.
