= The BFG =

1982 children's novel by Roald Dahl

- First edition cover
- Author: Roald Dahl
- Original title: THE BFG
- Illustrator: Quentin Blake
- Language: English
- Subject: Fiction
- Genre: Children's, Fantasy
- Published: 14 January 1982 Jonathan Cape (original); Penguin Books (current)
- Publication place: United Kingdom
- Media type: Paperback
- Pages: 208
- ISBN: 0-224-02040-4

The BFG (short for The Big Friendly Giant) is a 1982 children's novel by British author Roald Dahl. It is an expansion of a short story from Dahl's 1975 novel Danny, the Champion of the World. The book is dedicated to Dahl's oldest daughter, Olivia, who had died of measles encephalitis at the age of seven in 1962.

An animated adaptation was released in 1989 with David Jason providing the voice of the BFG and Amanda Root as the voice of Sophie. It has also been adapted as a theatre performance. A theatrical Disney live-action adaptation directed by Steven Spielberg was released in 2016.

As of 2009, the novel has sold 37 million copies, with more than one million copies sold around the world yearly. In 2003, The BFG was listed at number 56 in The Big Read, a BBC survey of the British public. In 2012, the novel was ranked number 88 among all-time best children's novels in a survey published by School Library Journal, a US monthly. That same year, the BFG and Sophie appeared on Royal Mail commemorative postage stamps.

== Plot ==
Sophie, a young girl in an orphanage, cannot sleep. Looking out of her window, she sees a mysterious giant man in the street, carrying a suitcase and a trumpet. The giant sees Sophie, who tries to hide in bed, but the giant picks her up through the window. Sophie is carried to a large cave in the middle of a desolate land called Giant Country where the giant sets her down. Believing that he intends to eat her, Sophie pleads for her life, but the giant laughs and dismisses the idea. He explains that although most giants do eat humans, he does not because he is the Big Friendly Giant, or BFG; he had carried Sophie off merely so she would not reveal that she had seen a real giant, which would put him at risk of being captured for a zoo exhibit.

The BFG explains, in a unique and messy speech, that his nine neighbours are much bigger and stronger giants, who all happily eat humans every night. They vary their choice of destination both to avoid detection and because the humans' origins affect their taste. For example, people from Greece taste greasy, so no giant goes there, while people from Panama taste like hats. As he will never allow Sophie to leave in case she tells anyone of his existence, the BFG reveals the purpose of his suitcase and trumpet: he catches dreams in Dream Country, collects them in jars, and gives the good ones to children all around the world, but destroys the bad ones. Since he does not eat people, he must eat the only crop which grows on his land — the repulsive snozzcumber, which looks like a cucumber. Sophie states that it tastes like frog skin and rotten fish while the BFG states that it tastes like cockroaches and slime wanglers.

When the Bloodbottler, one of the other giants, enters the cave uninvited, Sophie hides in the snozzcumber; not knowing this, the BFG, in the hope that its revolting taste will drive the Bloodbottler away and thus prevent him from discovering Sophie, tricks the Bloodbottler into eating the vegetable. The Bloodbottler takes a bite of the snozzcumber; unknowingly putting Sophie in his mouth. Luckily, the larger giant's bite missed her by only a little, spits her out unnoticed and leaves in disgust, much to the BFG's and Sophie's relief. They then drink frobscottle, a delicious fizzy drink where the bubbles sink downwards rather than upwards, causing powerful and noisy flatulence, which the BFG calls "whizzpopping".

The BFG takes Sophie to Dream Country but is bullied along the way by his neighbors led by Fleshlumpeater, the largest and strongest, when they saw him as they tossed the BFG to each other. Afterwards, Sophie watches the BFG catch two dreams—while one would be a good dream, the other is a nightmare. Resentful of the other giants' mistreatment of him earlier that day, the BFG sneaks up to where they are napping and looses the nightmare on Fleshlumpeater, as they watch from a safe distance. Fleshlumpeater has a dream about a giant killer named Jack and accidentally starts a brawl with his companions due to his indiscriminate flailing and thrashing about while still asleep.

Sophie persuades the BFG to approach the Queen of England for help with the other giants. She navigates the giant to Buckingham Palace where he places Sophie in the Queen's bedroom. He then gives the Queen a nightmare that closely parallels actual events. Because the BFG setting Sophie in her bedroom was also part of the dream, the Queen believes her and speaks with the giant over breakfast. Fully convinced, she authorizes a task force to travel to Giant Country and secure them as they sleep.

The BFG guides a fleet of helicopters to the sleeping giants. Eight are successfully shackled, but the Fleshlumpeater awakes. Sophie and the BFG trick him into being tied up by making it look like that he was bitten by a "vindscreen viper". Having collected the BFG's dream collection, the helicopters carry all nine giants back to England where they are imprisoned in a 500 ft. deep pit the size of a football field. The BFG has the Queen have them only fed snozzcumbers that the BFG had the royal gardener grow.

The kings, presidents, prime ministers, and other rulers of every country that the giants had visited in the past sends thanks and gifts to the BFG and Sophie, for whom residences are built in Windsor Great Park. Tourists come in huge numbers to watch the giants in the pit reluctantly eating snozzcumbers. One incident had three drunks managed to climb the safety fence one night and fall in and gotten eaten causing the head keeper to put up a big sign on the fence saying "It is Forbidden to Feed the Giants". The BFG receives the official title of Royal Dream-Blower, and continues bestowing dreams upon children; he also learns to speak and write more intelligibly, writing a book identified as the novel itself, under another's name.

== Characters ==
- Sophie: The imaginative, creative, nearsighted and kind-hearted protagonist of the story who becomes a brave international heroine. She is named after Sophie Dahl, Dahl's first grandchild. She is voiced by Amanda Root in the 1989 film and portrayed by Ruby Barnhill in the 2016 film.
- The BFG: A friendly 24-foot-tall giant who has superhuman hearing and immense speed. His primary occupation is the collection and distribution of good dreams to children. He also appears in another novel, Danny, the Champion of the World, in which he is introduced as a folkloric character. His name is an initialism of 'Big Friendly Giant'. Voiced by David Jason in the 1989 film and voiced/motion-captured by Mark Rylance in the 2016 film.
- Nine Man-Eating Giants: Each man-eating giant is about 50-feet-tall and proportionately broad and powerful with big feet, brown burnt skin, and long arms. Their only clothes are skirt-like coverings around their waists. According to the BFG, the flavours of the humans that the man-eating giants dine on depends on their country of origin: the Turks taste like turkey, the Greeks are too greasy (and hence apparently no giant ever visits that country), the Japanese are too small enough for them to take about six of the Japanese to eat, the Norse are too big enough for them to take about two of the Norse to eat, people from Wellington taste like boots, people from Panama taste like hats, the Welsh taste like fish, people from Jersey taste like cardigans, and the Danes taste like dogs.
  - The Fleshlumpeater: The leader of the nine man-eating giants and the largest and most horrible of the bunch. He shows no mercy for eating so many humans over the years, and is happy with what he has done and would continue it if he could. Voiced by Don Henderson in the 1989 film and voiced/motion-captured by Jemaine Clement in the 2016 film.
  - The Bloodbottler: Second-in-command to the Fleshlumpeater and also the smartest of the bunch. He has a fondness for the taste of human blood. Voiced by Don Henderson in the 1989 film and voiced/motion-captured by Bill Hader in the 2016 film.
  - The Manhugger: One of the nine man-eating giants. Voiced/motion-captured by Adam Godley in the 2016 film.
  - The Meatdripper: One of the nine man-eating giants. He pretends to be a tree in a park and blends in with the other trees so that he can pick off the humans that go under him. Voiced/motion-captured by Paul Moniz de Sa in the 2016 film.
  - The Childchewer: One of the nine man-eating giants. He is best friends with the Meatdripper. No other information was given about The Childchewer, but his name implies that he enjoys the taste of children the most of all. Voiced/motion-captured by Jonathan Holmes in the 2016 film.
  - The Butcher Boy: The youngest of the nine man-eating giants. No other information was given about him. Voiced/motion-captured by Michael Adamthwaite in the 2016 film.
  - The Maidmasher: One of the nine man-eating giants. No other information was given about him. Voiced/motion-captured by Ólafur Darri Ólafsson in the 2016 film.
  - The Bonecruncher: One of the nine man-eating giants. He crunches on the bones of two humans for dinner every night and especially enjoys eating people from Turkey, making him the picky eater of the bunch, although he will go to other countries such as joining the other eight in a trip to England. Voiced/motion-captured by Daniel Bacon in the 2016 film.
  - The Gizzardgulper: The shortest of the nine man-eating giants. He often lies above the rooftops of the cities to grab people walking down the streets. Voiced/motion-captured by Chris Gibbs in the 2016 film.
- The Goochey Family: Mr. and Mrs. Goochey are the proprietors of the grocery store that's across from the orphanage while their children are Michael and Jane Goochey.
- Mrs. Clonkers: The unseen director of the orphanage in which Sophie lives at the start of the novel; described as cruel to her charges. Voiced by Myfanwy Talog in the 1989 film and portrayed by Marilyn Norry in the 2016 film.
- The Queen of England: The British monarch. Firm, bold, and ladylike, she plays an important role in helping Sophie and the BFG. Voiced by Angela Thorne in the 1989 film and portrayed by Penelope Wilton in the 2016 film.
- Mary: The Queen's maid. Voiced by Mollie Sugden in the 1989 film and portrayed by Rebecca Hall in the 2016 film.
- Mr. Tibbs: The Queen's butler with an imposing personage who helped to improvise a breakfast that is fit for the BFG. Voiced by Frank Thornton in the 1989 film and portrayed by Rafe Spall in the 2016 film.
- The Gardener: An unnamed gardener working for the Queen of England who faints at the sight of the BFG. He would later receive a bunch of snozzcumber seeds to grow.
- The King of Sweden: The ruler of Sweden who corroborates with the Queen of England on how people have been disappearing from Sweden.
- The Sultan of Baghdad - The ruler of Baghdad who corroborates with the Queen of England on how people have been disappearing from Baghdad.
- The Heads of the Army and the Air Force: Two officers answering to the Queen. Voiced by Michael Knowles and Ballard Berkeley in the 1989 film. In the 2016 film, there are three generals working for the Queen and are portrayed by Matt Frewer, Chris Shields, and Geoffrey Wade.
- The Young Pilot: A pilot who is the only one that enjoyed the travel to Giant Country.

== 2023 censorship controversy ==
Despite Roald Dahl having enjoined his publishers not to "so much as change a single comma in one of my books", in February 2023 Puffin Books, a division of Penguin Books, announced it would be re-writing portions of many of Dahl's children's novels, changing the language to, in the publisher's words, "ensure that it can continue to be enjoyed by all today." The decision was met with sharp criticism from groups and public figures including authors Salman Rushdie and Christopher Paolini, then-British prime minister Rishi Sunak, Queen Camilla, Kemi Badenoch, PEN America, and Brian Cox. Dahl's publishers in the United States, France, and the Netherlands announced they had declined to incorporate the changes.

In The BFG, more than eighty changes were made, including changing or removing references to colour in people (such as changing "Something very tall and very black and very thin" to "Something very tall and very dark and very thin", "the flashing black eyes" to "the flashing eyes", "their skins were burnt brown by the sun" to "their skins were burnt by the sun", "white as a sheet" to "still as a statue", and removing "His skin was reddish-brown"), changing "mother and father" to "parents" and "boys and girls" to "children", and changing "Esquimo" to "Inuit", "Sultan of Baghdad" to "Mayor of Baghdad", and "man-eating giants" to "human-eating giants".

Original text	2023 text
Inside the jar, just below the edge of the label, Sophie could see the putting-to-sleep dream lying peacefully on the bottom, pulsing gently, sea-green like the other one, but perhaps a trifle larger. 'Do you have separate dreams for boys and for girls?' Sophie asked. 'Of course,' the BFG said. 'If I is giving a girl's dream to a boy, even if it was a really whoppsy girl's dream, the boy would be waking up and thinking what a rotbungling grinksludging old dream that was.' 'Boys would,' Sophie said. 'These here is all the girls' dreams on this shelf,' the BFG said. 'Can I read a boy's dream?'	Inside the jar, just below the edge of the label, Sophie could see the putting-to-sleep dream lying peacefully on the bottom, pulsing gently, sea-green like the other one, but perhaps a trifle larger. 'Can I read more dreams?'

== References in other Roald Dahl books ==
The BFG first appears as a story told to Danny by his father in Danny, the Champion of the World. The ending is almost the same as James and the Giant Peach, when he writes a story about himself, by himself. Also, Mr. Tibbs relates to Mrs. Tibbs, the friend of Mr. Gilligrass, the U.S. president in Charlie and the Great Glass Elevator.

== Awards and recognition ==
The BFG has won numerous awards including the 1985 Deutscher Jugendliteraturpreis as the year's best children's book, in its German translation Sophiechen und der Riese and the 1991 Read Alone and Read Aloud BILBY Awards from the Children's Book Council of Australia.

In 2003 it was ranked number 56 in The Big Read, a two-stage survey of the British public by the BBC to determine the "Nation's Best-loved Novel". The U.S. National Education Association listed The BFG among the "Teachers' Top 100 Books for Children" based on a 2007 online poll. In 2012, it was ranked number 88 among all-time children's novels in a survey published by School Library Journal, a monthly with primarily U.S. audience. It was the fourth of four books by Dahl among the Top 100, more than any other writer. In 2023, the novel was ranked by BBC at no. 41 in their poll of "The 100 greatest children's books of all time".

== Editions ==
=== English ===
- ISBN 0-224-02040-4 (hardcover, 1982)
- ISBN 0-374-30469-6 (hardcover, 1982)
- ISBN 0-590-06019-8 (paperback, 1982)
- ISBN 0-435-12279-7 (hardcover, 1984)
- ISBN 0-14-031597-7 (paperback, 1984)
- ISBN 0-14-034019-X (paperback, 1985)
- ISBN 1-85715-924-1 (hardcover, 1993)
- ISBN 0-679-42813-5 (hardcover, 1993)
- ISBN 0-14-130105-8 (paperback, 1998)
- ISBN 0-14-130283-6 (paperback, 1999)
- ISBN 0-14-131137-1 (paperback, 2001)
- ISBN 0-224-06452-5 (hardcover, 2002)
- ISBN 978-0-14-241038-7 / ISBN 0-14-241038-1 (paperback, 2007)
- ISBN 0-14-133216-6 (audio CD read by Natasha Richardson)

=== Selected translations ===
- ISBN 90-261-1275-0 (De GVR, Dutch, 1983)
- ISBN 0-14-130105-8 (El gran gigante bonachón, Spanish, 1984)
- ISBN 3-498-01250-9 (Sophiechen und der Riese, German, 1984)
- ISBN 2-07-051372-6 (Le bon gros géant, French, 1984)
- ISBN 4-566-01057-0 (オ・ヤサシ巨人BFG (O yasashi kyojin bīefujī, Japanese, 1985)
- ISBN 88-7782-004-7 (Il GGG, Italian, 1987)
- ISBN 0-624-03190-X (Die GSR: die groot sagmoedige reus, Afrikaans, 1993)
- ISBN 89-527-0972-1 (내 친구 꼬마 거인 (Nae ch'in'gu kkoma kŏin), Korean, 1997)
- ISBN 99927-33-02-0 (Gjiganti i madh i mirë, Albanian, 199-)
- ISBN 7-5332-3227-5 (好心眼儿巨人 (Hǎo xīnyǎn'ér Jùrén), Chinese, 2000)
- ISBN 1-904357-03-2 (Yr CMM: yr èc èm èm, Welsh, 2003)
- ISBN 973-576-573-X (Uriașul cel príetenos, Romanian, 2005)
- ISBN 83-240-3949-X (Wielkomilud, Polish, 2016)
- ISBN 978-9082197044 (De GFR, West Frisian, 2016)
- ISBN 978-1785300400 (The GFG, Scots, 2016)

== Adaptations ==
=== Audio ===
- In 1983, Bill Oddie narrated a 5-part adaptation for Jackanory. Bernard Bresslaw and Miriam Margolyes voiced the BFG and the Queen.
- In 1991, Sir Michael Hordern narrated an 8-part adaptation on BBC Radio 5, running from 25 March to 3 April.
- In 2006, Natasha Richardson narrated an unabridged recording for Harper Childrens Audio.
- In 2016, David Walliams narrated an unabridged recording for Puffin Audio.

=== Comic strip ===
Between 1986 and 1998, the novel was adapted into a newspaper comic by journalist Brian Lee and artist Bill Asprey. It was published in the Mail on Sunday and originally a straight adaptation, with scripts accepted by Roald Dahl himself. After a while the comic started following its own storylines and continued long after Dahl's death in 1990.

=== Theatre ===
The novel was adapted for the stage by David Wood and premiered at the Wimbledon Theatre in 1991 and has since been performed in the West End and theatres across the UK and USA.

The Royal Shakespeare Company, Chichester Festival Theatre and Singapore Repertory Theatre presented a new stage adaptation by Tom Wells and directed by Daniel Evans. It opened at the Royal Shakespeare Theatre, Stratford-upon-Avon in November 2025 for the Christmas season, before transferring to Chichester in March 2026 and Esplanade – Theatres on the Bay in April 2026.

== Film and television ==
=== 1989 film ===
On 25 December 1989, ITV broadcast an animated film based on the book and produced by Cosgrove Hall Films on television, with David Jason providing the voice of the BFG and Amanda Root as the voice of Sophie. The film was dedicated to animator George Jackson who worked on numerous Cosgrove Hall productions.

=== 2016 film ===
A theatrical live-action film adaptation was produced by Walt Disney Pictures, directed by Steven Spielberg, and starring Mark Rylance as the BFG, as well as Ruby Barnhill, Penelope Wilton, Jemaine Clement, Rebecca Hall, Rafe Spall, and Bill Hader. The film was released on 1 July 2016, to positive critical reception. Despite the positive reviews, the film was financially unsuccessful at the box office.

=== TV series ===
As of 2021 TV series based on The BFG is being developed as part of Netflix's "animated series event", based on Roald Dahl's books.
