= James and the Giant Peach =

1961 children's novel by Roald Dahl

- First edition (US)
- Author: Roald Dahl
- Illustrator: Nancy Ekholm Burkert (first US edition); Michael Simeon (first UK edition); Emma Chichester Clark (1990 UK edition); Quentin Blake (1995 edition); Lane Smith (1996 US edition); Jordan Crane (2011 50th anniversary edition)
- Language: English
- Genre: Children's novel, Fantasy
- Published: 1961
- Publisher: Alfred A. Knopf, Inc.
- Publication date: 17 July 1961
- Publication place: United Kingdom
- Media type: Hardcover
- Pages: 160
- OCLC: 50568125
- Dewey Decimal: [Fic] 21
- LC Class: PZ8.D137 James 2002

James and the Giant Peach is a children's novel written in 1961 by British author Roald Dahl. The first edition, published by Alfred Knopf, featured illustrations by Nancy Ekholm Burkert. There have been re-illustrated versions of it over the years, drawn by Michael Simeon (for the first British edition), Emma Chichester Clark, Lane Smith and Quentin Blake. It was adapted into a film of the same name in 1996 (with Smith being a conceptual designer) which was directed by Henry Selick, and a musical in 2010.

The plot centres on an orphan boy who enters a gigantic, magical peach, and has a wild and surreal adventure with seven magically altered garden bugs he meets. Dahl was going to write about a giant cherry, but changed it to James and the Giant Peach because a peach is "prettier, bigger and squishier than a cherry". Because of the story's occasional macabre and potentially frightening content, it has become a regular target of censors.

Dahl dedicated the book to his six-year-old daughter Olivia, and four-year-old daughter Tessa (Note: "Measles: A Dangerous Illness" only lists Olivia as a dedicatee for James and the Giant Peach. However, the dedication page of said book clearly lists both Olivia and Tessa as dedicatees.); Olivia died from measles only a year after the book was published.

American novelist Bret Easton Ellis cites James and the Giant Peach as his favourite children's book:

It changed my life. My aunt read it to me, my sisters and my three cousins in two sittings over vacation at a beach house when I was about six. The idea that the world was meaner, crueller, more absurd and fantastical than anything that picture books had previously showed me made a real impact. That was the moment I couldn’t go back [as a reader].

== Plot summary ==
James Henry Trotter lives happily with his parents in a house by the sea in the south of England. When he is four years old, a rhinoceros escapes from London Zoo and eats James' parents whilst they are on a shopping trip in London. He ends up in the care of his two cruel aunts, Aunt Spiker and Aunt Sponge, who physically and verbally abuse him, isolate him in their "queer ramshackle house on the top of a high hill" (Note: As Chapter 1 puts it.), dole out sadistic punishments for the smallest infractions, force him to sleep on bare floorboards in a prison-cell-like room, and force him to do heavy chores that they never bother doing themselves. Instead of his real name, they call him insults like "you disgusting little beast" or "you miserable creature".

One day, after James has been living with his aunts for three years, when he is sent behind a clump of laurel bushes for only requesting a day trip to the seaside, he meets a mysterious man who gives him a bag of magical crystals, instructing James to use them in a potion that will change his life for the better. While returning home, James stumbles and spills the bag on the ground, losing the crystals as they dig themselves underground next to a nearby barren peach tree. Immediately, the tree produces a single peach which soon grows to the size of a house. The next day, Spiker and Sponge build a fence around it and earn money by selling viewing tickets to tourists; James is locked in the house, only able to see the peach and the crowds through the bars of his bedroom window.

After the tourists have gone, James is told to clean the rubbish around the peach and finds a hole inside it. He crawls in, through a tunnel, and finds himself in a room, in the enlarged peach pit; where he meets Centipede, Miss Spider, Old Green Grasshopper, Earthworm, Ladybug, Glowworm, and Silkworm who become his friends and express their dreams of leaving Spiker and Sponge's hill as their lives, like James', have been made miserable by the two aunts.

The next day, Centipede cuts the stem of the peach, causing it to roll away and crush James' aunts to death. After leaving behind a trail of destruction (including crashing through a chocolate factory (Note: In at least one edition, the name "WONKA" is written on said factory. See Charlie and the Chocolate Factory.)), it reaches the sea and is surrounded by ravenous sharks. James uses Miss Spider and Silkworm to make threads, while Earthworm is used as bait and draws 501 seagulls to the peach, whereupon the threads are tied on their necks. The peach is lifted off the water. High above the clouds, during the journey, while James learns about his friends' lives before they encountered each other, the Centipede accidentally falls overboard, but gets rescued by James.

That night, the peach encounters Cloud-Men, who are portrayed as responsible for weather such as hailstorms and rainbows. Centipede mocks the Cloud-Men, who throw things at the group until they get clear. The peach briefly gets tangled in the ropes holding up a rainbow, making a Cloud-Man jump onto one of the seagull strings, which the Centipede cuts loose. In retaliation for the loss of one of their friends, the Cloud-Men hurl cans of rainbow paint, which coat the Centipede in fast-drying rainbow paint that freezes him into a statue. Afterwards, the travelers barely escape the Cloud-Men's faucets that make the rain, which frees the Centipede. Almost before dawn, as they leave the Cloud-Men's homes behind, the group briefly encounters a giant bat.

About dawn, James sees that the group has reached New York City and arranges for some seagulls to be let loose for them to land. Then, however, the wing of a passing plane severs the rest of the strings, and the peach falls onto the spire of the Empire State Building. It is mistaken for a bomb at first and then a spaceship, resulting in the arrival of police and firemen. Calming the crowd, James tells his story, and becomes friends with many children in New York; they eat the peach and James and his friends get their own jobs, now residing in Central Park, in the pit of the peach. As James gets many requests to tell about his adventures on the giant peach, he writes a book about it; said book is that which the reader has just finished reading.

== Characters ==
- James Henry Trotter – The seven-year-old male protagonist.
- The Old Man – A friendly yet mysterious man, who initiates James' adventure.
- Aunt Spiker – A thin, tall, cruel and evil woman; Aunt Sponge's sister.
- Aunt Sponge – A fat, treacherous, greedy and evil woman; Aunt Spiker's sister.
- The Centipede – A male centipede, depicted as a boisterous rascal and proud of his 'hundred legs', even though he only has 42.
- The Earthworm – A male earthworm who often quarrels with the Centipede.
- The Old Green Grasshopper – A male grasshopper, who is the eldest and most cultured of the bugs.
- The Ladybug – A kind, motherly female ladybird.
- Miss Spider – A good-natured female spider who takes care of James.
- The Glowworm – A female glowworm, who is used as a lighting system for the peach.
- The Silkworm – A female silkworm, who assists Miss Spider in the production of thread, both before and after the adventure.

== 2023 censorship controversy ==
Despite Roald Dahl having enjoined his publishers not to "so much as change a single comma in one of my books", in February 2023 Puffin Books, a division of Penguin Books, announced it would be re-writing portions of many of Dahl's children's novels, changing the language to, in the publisher's words, "ensure that it can continue to be enjoyed by all today". The decision was met with sharp criticism from groups and public figures including authors Salman Rushdie and Christopher Paolini, British prime minister Rishi Sunak, Queen Camilla, Kemi Badenoch, PEN America, and Brian Cox. Dahl's publishers in the United States, France, and the Netherlands announced they had declined to incorporate the changes.

In James and the Giant Peach, more than seventy changes were made, such as removing references to Sponge as fat (including writing an entirely new poem), changing queer to strange, removing references to skin colour (such as "his face white with horror", "looking white and thin", and the Earthworm's "lovely pink skin"), and changing Cloud-Men to Cloud-People.

Original text	2023 text
There were caves everywhere running into the cloud, and at the entrances to the caves the Cloud-Men's wives were crouching over little stoves with frying-pans in their hands, frying snowballs for their husbands' suppers.	There were houses everywhere running into the cloud.

== Adaptations ==
=== Film adaptations ===
A television adaptation of the novel appeared on BBC One on 28 December 1976. Paul Stone directed a script by Trever Preston. The cast included Simon Bell playing James, Bernard Cribbins playing Centipede, and Anna Quayle playing Aunt Spiker.

Though Roald Dahl declined numerous offers during his life to have a film version of James and the Giant Peach produced, his widow, Felicity Dahl, approved an offer to have a film adaptation produced in conjunction with Disney in the mid-1990s. It was directed by Henry Selick and produced by Denise Di Novi and Tim Burton, all of whom previously worked on The Nightmare Before Christmas. The film used a mix of live action and stop-motion to reduce production finances. It was narrated by Pete Postlethwaite (who also played the old man) and featured five songs composed and written by Randy Newman. The film was released on 12 April 1996. Although it was a box office failure, it received positive reviews and eventually became a cult classic upon its release on home video.

There are many changes in both the plot of the film and the plot of the book (notably, the aunts survive the rolling peach and follow James all the way to New York City, and the Silkworm is absent), though the film was generally well-received. Felicity Dahl said, "I think Roald would have been delighted with what they did with James." Owen Gleiberman of Entertainment Weekly praised the animated part, but calling the live-action segments "crude". Newman was nominated for an Academy Award for Best Original Musical or Comedy Score.

In August 2016, Sam Mendes was in negotiations with Disney to direct another live action adaptation of the novel, with Nick Hornby in talks for the script. In May 2017, Mendes was no longer attached to the project due to his entering talks with Disney about directing a live-action film adaptation of Pinocchio.

=== Musical adaptation ===
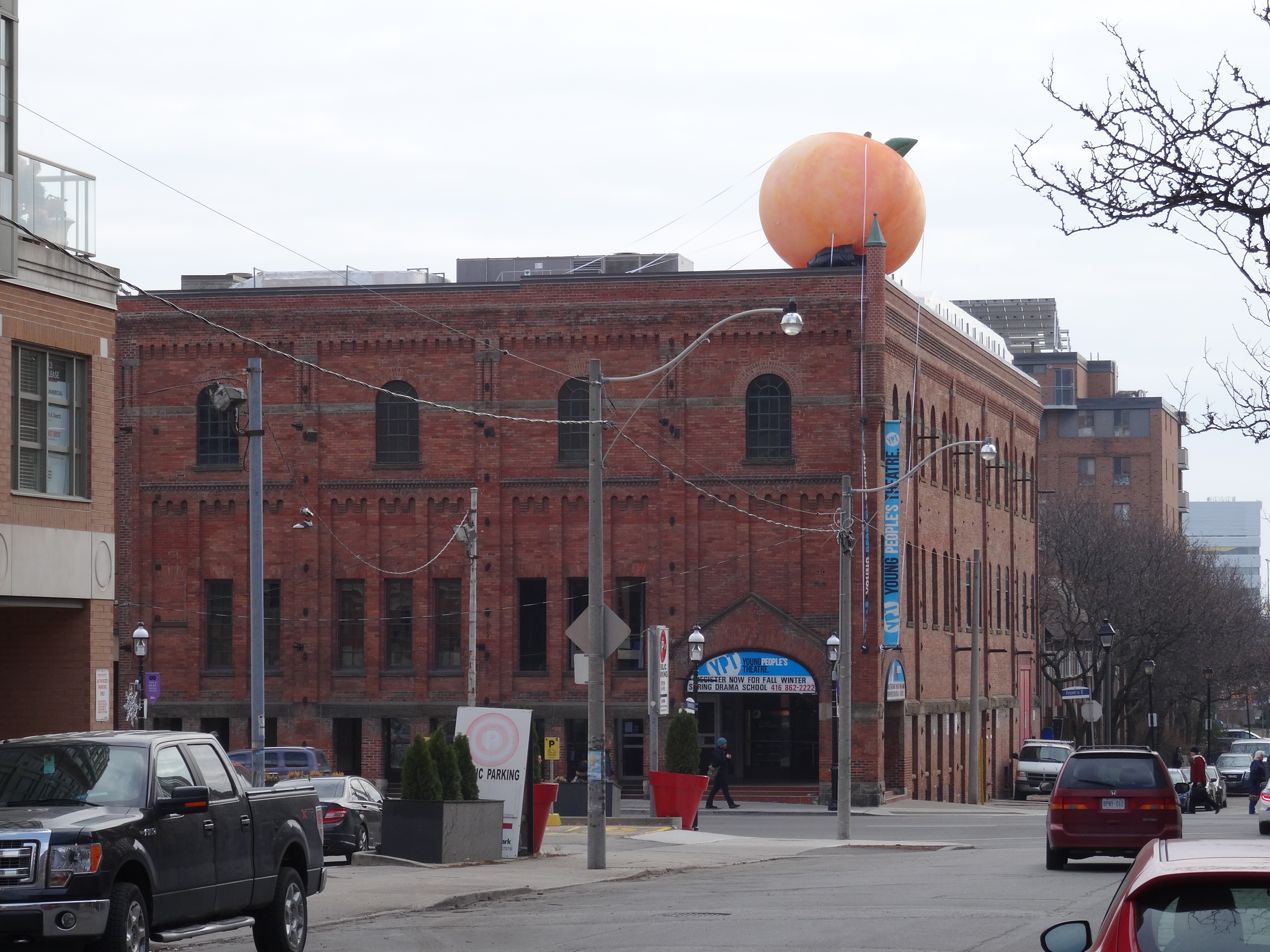
James and the Giant Peach musical playing at the Young People's Theatre in Toronto, 2014

The book was made into a musical with music and lyrics by Benj Pasek and Justin Paul and book by Timothy Allen McDonald. The musical had its premiere at Goodspeed Musicals on 21 October 2010, and is currently produced in regional and youth theatre.

=== Stage adaptation ===
David Wood's play based on James and the Giant Peach has been performed worldwide. It was first produced in 2001 by the Sherman Theatre, Cardiff and Birmingham Stage Company, who then toured it all over the UK. Other major productions have been mounted by West Yorkshire Playhouse and Polka Theatre, and it is very popular with community and amateur companies in the UK and US. The play is published and licensed by Concord Theatricals.

=== Theatrical adaptation ===
Ray DaSilva's Norwich Puppet Theatre put on puppet theatre performances in 1985.

=== Audiobooks ===
The book has been recorded a number of times, including:

- 1977 - by Roald Dahl himself for Caedmon Records (TC-1543 [abridged LP]/CDL 51543 [abridged cassette])
- 2003 – by Jeremy Irons for Harper Children's Audio
- 2016 – by Julian Rhind-Tutt for Puffin Audio

=== Charity readings ===
In May 2020, in the midst of the COVID-19 pandemic, Taika Waititi, the Oscar-winning director, worked with the Roald Dahl Story Company to publish audio-visual readings of the book. Waititi was joined by Oscar-winning actresses Meryl Streep, Lupita Nyong'o, and Cate Blanchett; actors Benedict Cumberbatch, Liam and Chris Hemsworth, Ryan Reynolds; the Duchess of Cornwall, and others in ten installments which were then published to the Roald Dahl YouTube channel.

The event was organized to raise money for the global-non profit Partners In Health, founded by Dahl's daughter Ophelia, which had been fighting COVID-19 in vulnerable areas; with Roald Dahl Story Co. committing to match donations up to $1 million. Waititi had already been working with the company as the writer, director, and executive producer for Netflix's upcoming serialised adaption of Charlie and the Chocolate Factory.

== Editions ==
- 2011 – ISBN 0-14-310634-1 (Penguin Classics Deluxe Edition paperback, 51th anniversary, illustrated by Jordan Crane and Nancy Ekholm Burkert, introduction by Aimee Bender)
- 1996 – ISBN 0679880909 (paperback, illustrated by Lane Smith)
- 1995 – ISBN 0-14-037156-7 (paperback, illustrated by Quentin Blake)
- 1994 – ISBN 1-55734-441-8 (paperback)
- 1990 – ISBN 0-14-034269-9 (paperback, illustrated by Emma Chichester Clark)
- 1980 – ISBN 0-553-15113-4 (Bantam Skylark paperback)
- 1961 – ISBN 0-394-81282-4 (hardcover)
- 1961 – ISBN 978-0-394-91282-0 (library binding, illustrated by Nancy Ekholm Burkert)
