= The Roald Dahl Treasury =

1997 anthology of the British writer's works

First edition

The Roald Dahl Treasury is an anthology of works of the children's author Roald Dahl. It was first published in the United Kingdom in 1997 by Jonathan Cape.

Included amongst excerpts from all of Dahl's children's books and some previously unpublished material, are unexpurgated colour reprints of The Enormous Crocodile, The Giraffe and the Pelly and Me, Esio Trot and The Minpins.

The book includes a large volume of illustrations by Quentin Blake, with some specially commissioned for the project and some appearing for the first time in colour. A selection of guest illustrators including Raymond Briggs and Ralph Steadman add visual variety to the extracts. The book also includes an excerpt from an interview given by Dahl and many letters exchanged between Dahl and family members, including Ophelia Dahl.

== Reception ==
The Roald Dahl Treasury received generally positive reviews. Robert McCrum of The Observer deemed it "a sumptuously illustrated anthology" and "a wonderful introduction" to Dahl's work for children. Tony Bradman of The Daily Telegraph critiqued some of the passages included as not well-representing their books, but overall labelled Treasury as "a fascinating overview of Dahl's oeuvre for children."
