= Things in Their Season =

1974 American drama film

- Directed by: James Goldstone
- Written by: John Gay
- Produced by: Herbert Hirschman; Phillip Barry Jr.
- Starring: Patricia Neal; Marc Singer; Ed Flanders; Meg Foster
- Cinematography: Terry K. Meade
- Edited by: Edward A. Biery
- Music by: Ken Lauber
- Production company: Tomorrow Entertainment
- Distributed by: CBS
- Release date: November 27, 1974
- Running time: 90 minutes
- Country: United States
- Language: English

Things in Their Season is a 1974 American made-for-television tragedy drama film directed by James Goldstone and written by John Gay. It stars Patricia Neal, Marc Singer, Ed Flanders, and Meg Foster.

The film focuses on the son (Singer) and mother (Neal) of a close-knit farming family in rural Wisconsin that operates a dairy farm whose lives are impacted when the former decides to get married and move out, and the latter discovers that she has leukemia and not much time left to live.

== Cast ==
- Patricia Neal as Peg Gerlach
- Marc Singer as Andy Gerlach
- Ed Flanders as Carl Gerlach
- Meg Foster as Judy Pines
- Charles Haid as Willie McCreevy
- Doreen Lang as Millie Havemeyer
- Med Flory as John Tillman

== Production ==
Screenwriter John Gay originally came up with the concept of play about a dairy farmers in small town Wisconsin after spending a week in Shawano, Wisconsin, but decided to turn the idea into a screenplay after observing dairy farmer first hand and their operations in the community.

Executives at CBS reached out to their Green Bay-based affiliate WBAY-TV for locations to shoot the film. WBAY-TV station personnel referred them to their former farm services director Jim Kasten. Kasten worked at the farmers co-op in the city of Shawano and recommended the city as the filming location for Things in Their Season.

Filming took place on location in and around the city of Shawano and surrounding Shawano County, Wisconsin during a three-week period in September and October 1974.

== Release ==
The film aired nationally on CBS on November 27, 1974.
