= Valentine and Orson =

Carolingian cycle

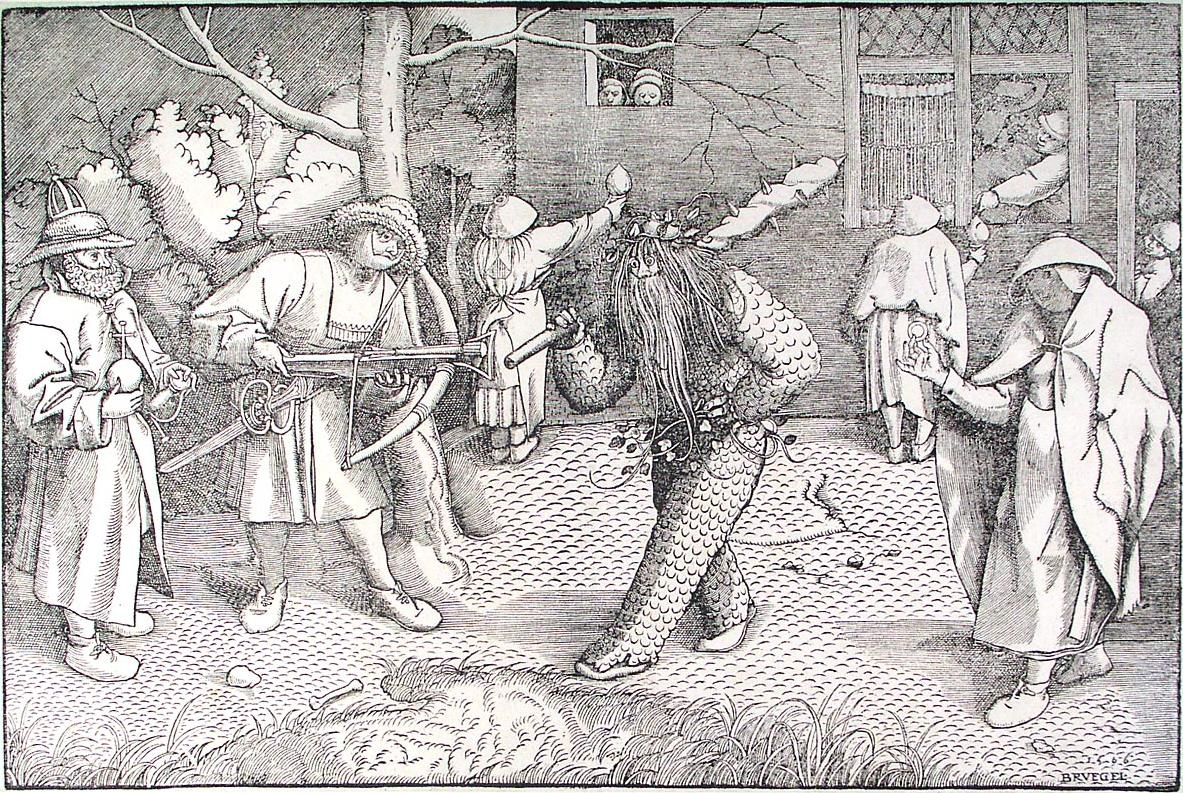
Print after Pieter Bruegel the Elder of a performance based on the romance

Valentine and Orson is a romance which has been attached to the Carolingian cycle.

== Synopsis ==
It is the story of twin brothers, abandoned in the woods in infancy. Valentine is brought up as a knight at the court of Pepin, while Orson grows up in a bear's den to be a wild man of the woods, until Valentine finds, overcomes, and tames him. He then becomes Valentine's servant and comrade. In some versions, the pair discover their true history with the help of a magical brazen head. The two eventually rescue their mother Bellisant, sister of Pepin and wife of the emperor of Greece, by whom she had been unjustly repudiated, from the power of a giant named Ferragus.

== Early modern versions ==
The tale is probably based on a lost French original, with Orson originally described as "sans nom" i.e. the "nameless" one. A 14th-century French chanson de geste, Valentin et Sansnom (i.e. Valentin and "Nameless") has not survived but was translated/adapted in medieval German as Valentin und Namelos (first half of the 15th century).

The kernel of the story lies in Orson's upbringing and wildness, and is evidently a folk-tale, with a purely artificial connection to the Carolingian cycle. The story of the wife unjustly accused with which it is bound up is sufficiently common, and was told of the wives both of Pippin and Charlemagne. The work has a number of references to other, older, works, including: Floovant, The Four Sons of Aymon, Lion de Bourges, and Maugis d'Aigremont.

Like nearly all popular romances of chivalry of the period, the French chanson de geste was adapted into a prose romance by the end of the 15th century; several versions from the 16th century are extant; the oldest prose version dates from 1489 (published in Lyon by Jacques Maillet). An English-language version, The Historye of the two Valyannte Brethren: Valentyne and Orson, written by Henry Watson, printed by William Copland about 1550, is the earliest known of a long series of English versions - some of which included illustrations. One such illustrated variant of the tale was prepared by S R Littlwood and accompanied by the illustrations of Florence Anderson when published in 1919.

Other Renaissance versions exist in Italian, Spanish, Swedish, Dutch, German, and Icelandic. The number of translations show a European success for the tale. The works of François Rabelais have a number of echoes to the romance.

A pageant of Valentine and "Urson" was presented in London at Cheapside during the Royal Entry before the Coronation of Edward VI in 1547. It is known that Richard Hathwaye and Anthony Munday produced a theatrical version of the story in 1598.

== Modern versions and adaptations ==
Thomas Dibdin wrote an adaptation in 1804 which was later performed at the Theatres Royal Covent Garden, Haymarket, and Bath.

Nancy Ekholm Burkert wrote and illustrated a version of the story in 1989, in which the story is told through the lens of a traveling group of players (including two brothers) who bring the story to a village in Flanders in the Middle Ages.

== See also ==
- Gilgamesh & Enkidu, in the Epic of Gilgamesh
