= Spear's Wealth Management Survey =

British lifestyle magazine

Spear's

- Cover of Q4 2024 issue
- Editor: Edwin Smith
- Categories: Lifestyle
- Frequency: bimonthly
- Founder: William Cash
- Founded: 2006
- Company: Progressive Media International
- Country: United Kingdom
- Language: English
- Website: www.spearswms.com

Spear's (formerly known as Spear's WMS or Spear's Wealth Management Survey), founded in 2006 by William Cash, is a bimonthly British magazine for high-net-worth individuals and those in the financial service industries. It has been called "the Bible of the banking fraternity" by GQ and "a European rival to Forbes" by The Evening Standard. Nick Cohen called it "The best portrait I have seen of a world beyond our means and comprehension", in The Spectator. Its subscribers include over 30,000 of Europe's decision-makers and wealthy. William Cash, editor-at-large of Spear's, has twice won Editor of the Year at the PPA Awards (2007 and 2008). Spear's is now published by Progressive Digital Media. The launch in 2006 included publicity from The Independent, The Guardian, the Luxist and The Times.

Spear's Indices are surveys of key people in the high net worth world. Spear's Salon is Spear's blogging forum which hosts a number of regular contributors. Spear's 500 are rankings of consultants and service providers in several wealth and luxury related industries. They also publish the Spear's 500 Travel.

Under Alec Marsh's editorship the magazine has run a series of interviews with high-profile figures including Prince Albert II of Monaco, the former Irish president Mary Robinson, the former Cabinet minister Rory Stewart and Nigel Farage, in which he talked about being hated and his return to politics before the launch of the Brexit party in 2019. In 2017, David Miliband, president of the International Rescue Committee, told Spear's that the world's rich needed to give more money to charity and good causes in an exclusive interview widely followed elsewhere. In June 2020, Alec Marsh stepped down as editor, becoming editor-at-large, and was succeeded by his deputy editor Edwin Smith.

== History ==
William Cash, a magazine writer who has also been a foreign correspondent for The Times and The Daily Telegraph, was Annabel's Magazine's contract publisher in 2005, when they published the pilot edition of Spear's as a supplement. At that time there was competition for advertisements from "fashion houses and luxury brands" upon which the magazine depended. Cash launched Spear's Wealth Management Survey in April 2006 with a targeted audience of "the 30,000 wealthiest, most successful and influential people in the UK: from Rich Listers to royalty; hedge fund managers to serial entrepreneurs; oligarchs to internet moguls; cabinet ministers to Alex Ferguson."

In February 2003, Cash married Ilaria Bulgari, whose father was the vice-chairman of Bulgari, the third largest jewellery company in the world. They divorced in 2007 and Cash sold the magazine for about £1.2 million to Luxury Publishing. Then in 2009 he bought a 67% holding back, with Nectar Capital holding the other shares. Cash is the owner of Upton Cressett Hall, a 16th-century Tudor manor in Shropshire.

In 2015 Spear's became available at 250 outlets in London, as well as on subscription.

Freelance writer Alec Marsh, a former Daily Telegraph journalist and Daily Mail gossip columnist, was appointed editor of Spear's in January 2017. Marsh, who is also the author of the Drabble and Harris adventure novels, took over from Christopher Silvester, who was editor in 2016. Silvester took over from longtime former Spear's editor, Josh Spero, who left to join the Financial Times at the end of 2015.

== Spear's Salon ==
Topics covered in Spear's WMS include 'Asset Management' with articles on investments in bonds versus equities, quantitative easing, impact of Mark Carney's appointment on the HNW individuals, Risks and Rewards of Rare Earths Investments; 'Art & Collecting' with articles on the art market boom, gallery etiquette and collectors who only want top names; 'The Good Life' with articles on owning your own island, airports becoming more luxurious, Aston Martin, Lamborghini and Porsche competitions; 'Property' with articles on the repossession of a £5.25 million property in One Hyde Park, social investment and the housing crisis and leaseholds in London; 'Legal' and 'Taxation" with articles on challenging the notion that companies must minimise the tax they pay, that tax avoidance is not a fiduciary duty, how US laws impact tax evasion by use of Swiss banks and G20 take action against tax-avoiding multinationals. They also deal with topics such as how to manage profits on the sale of hobby thoroughbreds without incurring a tax liability, and bulletproof cars.

== Spear's Indices ==
Spear's publishes their Indices in each issue in which they rank and rate the top individuals in each wealth management sector. Indexes include: London's top UHNW wealth managers, Spear's Family Lawyers, Spear's Hotel Index, Spear's Security Index, Education Index, UHNW Wealth Management and Family Office Index, Legal Index, Accountancy Index, Philanthropy Index, Reputation Management Index, Property Index, Artan Collecting Index, International Financial Centres Index (IFCs), Security Index, Private Equity Index, Business Angels Index and Hotels Index. In the November/December 2019 edition Spear's published its first Luxury Index featuring 100 of the leading individuals in luxury today, from hoteliers to horologists, to tailors, interior designers and jewellers.

== Spear's 500 ==
Spear's publishes this annual rankings in two categories. "Band One" is the rankings of top private client professionals focused on wealth management, law and advisory services. "Band 2" is the rankings of private client services primarily focused around lifestyle, alternative investment and luxury.

== Spear's 500 Travel ==
Spear's 500 Travel is a rankings of luxury hotels, resorts, holiday rentals and tour operators in the world, including private aviation and yachts.

== Spear's Book Awards ==
Spear's Book Awards were awarded in a number of categories between 2009 and 2014. In 2009, the awards jury picked books which went on to win the Man Booker Prize and the FT/Goldman Sachs Prize.

In 2010 the categories included:

- Citi Private Bank Financial History of the Year
- Financial Book of the Year
- Biography of the Year
- Family History of the Year
- Social History of the Year
- Illustrated Book of the Year
- Novel of the Year
- Spear's Special Awards:
  - For Best First Book
  - For Outstanding Achievement for a body of work
  - For an Outstandingly Produced Book
