= Patricia Neal =

American stage and film actress (1926–2010)

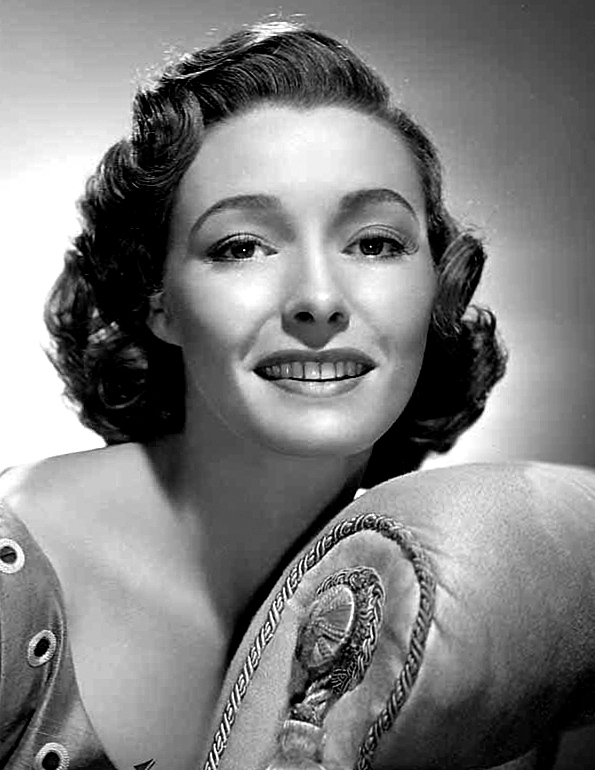
- Neal in 1952
- Born: Patsy Louise Neal; January 20, 1926; Packard, Whitley County, Kentucky, U.S.
- Died: August 8, 2010 (aged 84); Edgartown, Massachusetts, U.S.
- Resting place: Abbey of Regina Laudis
- Occupation: Actress
- Years active: 1945–2010
- Spouse: Roald Dahl (m. 1953; div. 1983)
- Children: Olivia; Tessa; Theo; Ophelia; Lucy
- Relatives: Sophie Dahl (granddaughter); Phoebe Dahl (granddaughter)

Patricia Neal (born Patsy Louise Neal; January 20, 1926 – August 8, 2010) was an American actress of stage and screen. She is well known for, among other roles, playing World War II widow Helen Benson in The Day the Earth Stood Still (1951), radio journalist Marcia Jeffries in A Face in the Crowd (1957), wealthy matron Emily Eustace Failenson in Breakfast at Tiffany's (1961), and the worn-out housekeeper Alma Brown in Hud (1963) (for which she won the Academy Award for Best Actress).

She also featured as the matriarch in the television film The Homecoming: A Christmas Story (1971); her role as Olivia Walton was re-cast for the series it inspired, The Waltons. A major star of the 1950s and 1960s, she was the recipient of an Academy Award, a Golden Globe Award, a Tony Award, and two British Academy Film Awards, and was nominated for three Primetime Emmy Awards.

== Early life and education ==
Neal was born in Packard, Whitley County, Kentucky, to William Burdette Neal and Eura Mildred (née Petrey) Neal. She had two siblings.

Neal grew up in Knoxville, Tennessee, where she attended Knoxville High School, and studied drama at Northwestern, where she was a member of Pi Beta Phi sorority. At Northwestern, she was crowned Syllabus Queen in a campus-wide beauty pageant. She left Northwestern after talent scouts convinced her to leave for New York.

== Career ==
Neal gained her first job in New York as an understudy in the Broadway production of the John Van Druten play The Voice of the Turtle. Next, she appeared in Lillian Hellman's Another Part of the Forest (1946), winning the 1947 Tony Award for Best Featured Actress in a Play, in the first presentation of the Tony awards.

Neal made her film debut with Ronald Reagan in John Loves Mary in 1949, followed by another role with Reagan in The Hasty Heart the same year. Her work in The Fountainhead, which was released in 1949, coincided with her affair with married co-star Gary Cooper; she worked with him again in Bright Leaf (1950).

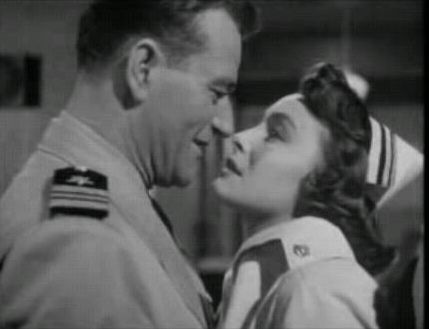
John Wayne and Patricia Neal

Neal starred with John Garfield in The Breaking Point (1950), in The Day the Earth Stood Still (1951) with Michael Rennie, and in Operation Pacific (also 1951) starring John Wayne. She suffered a nervous breakdown around this time, following the end of her relationship with Gary Cooper, and departed Hollywood for New York, returning to Broadway in 1952 for a revival of The Children's Hour. In 1955, she starred in Edith Sommer's A Roomful of Roses, staged by Guthrie McClintic.

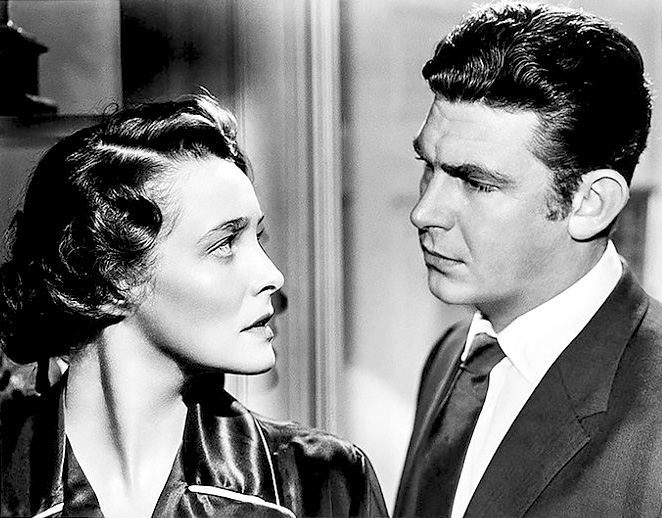
Neal with Andy Griffith

While in New York, Neal became a member of the Actors Studio. Based on connections with other members, she subsequently co-starred in the film A Face in the Crowd (1957, directed by Elia Kazan), the play The Miracle Worker (1959, directed by Arthur Penn), the film Breakfast at Tiffany's (1961), and the film Hud (1963), directed by Martin Ritt and starring Paul Newman. During the same period, she appeared on television in an episode of The Play of the Week (1960), featuring an Actors Studio-dominated cast in a double bill of plays by August Strindberg. In a British production of Clifford Odets' Clash by Night (1959), she co-starred with one of the first generation of Actors Studio members, Nehemiah Persoff.

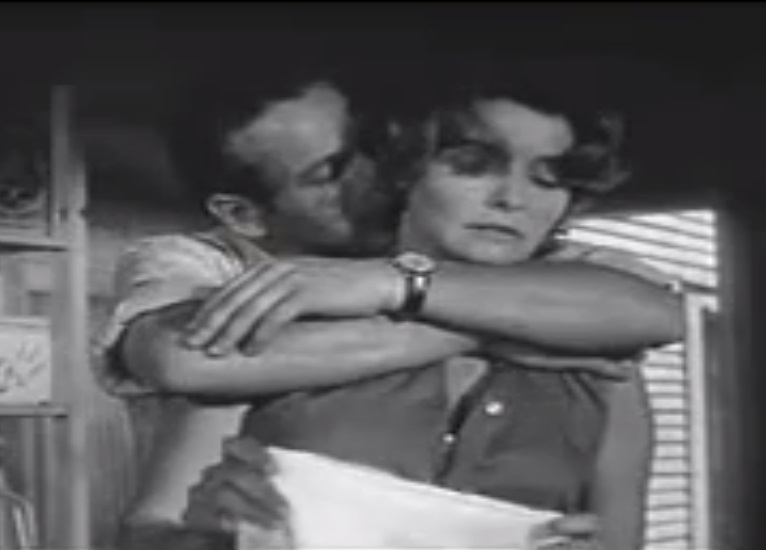
Neal with Paul Newman

Neal won the Academy Award for Best Actress in Hud (1963), co-starring with Paul Newman. When the film was initially released it was predicted she would be a nominee in the Supporting Actress category, but when she began collecting awards, they were always for Best Actress, from the New York Film Critics, the National Board of Review and a BAFTA award from the British Academy of Film and Television Arts.

Neal was re-united with John Wayne in Otto Preminger's In Harm's Way (1965), winning her second BAFTA Award. Her next film was The Subject Was Roses (1968), for which she was nominated for an Academy Award. She starred as the matriarch in the television film The Homecoming: A Christmas Story (1971), which inspired the television series The Waltons; she won a Golden Globe for her performance. In a 1999 interview with the Archive of American Television, Waltons creator Earl Hamner said he and producers were unsure if Neal's health would allow her to commit to the schedule of a weekly television series; so, instead, they cast Michael Learned in the role of Olivia Walton. Neal played a dying widowed mother trying to find a home for her three children in an episode of NBC's Little House on the Prairie broadcast in 1975.

Neal appeared in a series of television commercials in the 1970s and 1980s, notably for pain relief medicine Anacin and Maxim instant coffee.

Neal played the title role in Robert Altman's movie Cookie's Fortune (1999). She worked on Silvana Vienne's movie Beyond Baklava: The Fairy Tale Story of Sylvia's Baklava (2007), appearing as herself in the portions of the documentary talking about alternative ways to end violence in the world. In the same year as the film's release, Neal received one of two annually-presented Lifetime Achievement Awards at the SunDeis Film Festival in Waltham, Massachusetts. (Academy Award nominee Roy Scheider was the recipient of the other.)

Having won a Tony Award in its inaugural year (1947), eventually becoming the last surviving winner from that first ceremony, Neal often appeared as a presenter in later years. Her original Tony was lost, so she was given a surprise replacement by Bill Irwin when they were about to present the 2006 Tony Award for Best Performance by a Leading Actress in a Play to Cynthia Nixon. In April 2009, Neal received a lifetime achievement award from WorldFest Houston on the occasion of the debut of her film, Flying By. Neal was a long-term actress with Philip Langner's Theatre at Sea/Sail With the Stars productions with the Theatre Guild. In her final years she appeared in a number of health-care videos.

Neal was inducted into the American Theatre Hall of Fame in 2003. She was a subject of the British television show This Is Your Life in 1978 when she was surprised by Eamonn Andrews at a cocktail party on London's Park Lane.

== Personal life ==
In 1948, either during filming or after finishing work on The Fountainhead (1949), Neal began an affair with her married co-star Gary Cooper, whom she had met in 1947 when she was 21 and he was 46. Cooper's wife confronted him and Cooper confessed that he was in love with Neal, and continued to see her. Cooper and his wife were legally separated in May 1951, but he did not seek a divorce. Neal later claimed that Cooper hit her after she went on a date with Kirk Douglas, and that he arranged for her to have an abortion when she became pregnant with Cooper's child. Neal ended their relationship in late December 1951.

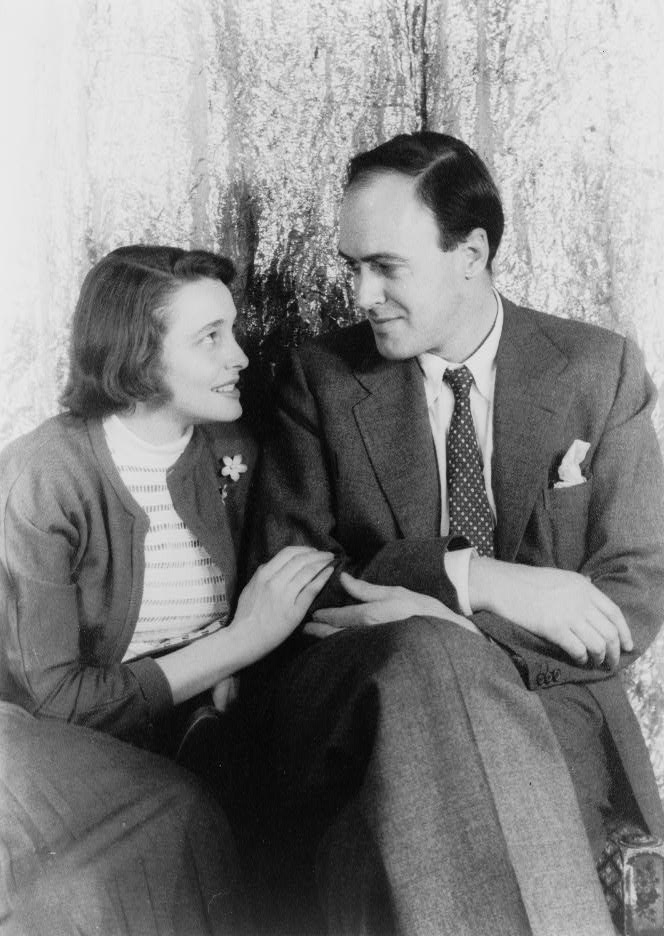
Patricia Neal and Roald Dahl: photo by Carl Van Vechten, 1954

Neal met British writer Roald Dahl at a dinner party hosted by Lillian Hellman in 1952, while Dahl was living in New York. They married on July 2, 1953, at Trinity Church in New York. The marriage produced five children.

1. Olivia Twenty (1955–1962)
2. Chantal Sophia "Tessa" (born 1957) (mother of Sophie Dahl)
3. Theo Matthew (born 1960)
4. Ophelia Magdalena (born 1964)
5. Lucy Neal (born 1965)

On December 5, 1960, their son Theo, four months old, suffered brain damage when his baby carriage was struck by a taxicab in New York City. In May 1961, the family returned to Gipsy House in Great Missenden, Buckinghamshire, where Theo continued his rehabilitation. Neal described the two years of family life during Theo's recovery as one of the most beautiful periods of her life. However, on November 17, 1962, their daughter Olivia died at age 7 from measles encephalitis. The story of Olivia's death and how Neal and Dahl coped with the tragedy was dramatized in 2020 as a made-for-TV movie, To Olivia.

Neal was a heavy smoker. She suffered three cerebral aneurysms while pregnant in 1965 and was in a coma for three weeks. Assuming she had died, Variety magazine ran her obituary, but she survived with the assistance of Dahl and a number of volunteers who developed a grueling style of therapy which fundamentally changed the way that stroke patients were treated. This period of their lives was dramatized in the television film The Patricia Neal Story (1981), in which the couple was played by Glenda Jackson and Dirk Bogarde.

On August 4, 1965, Neal gave birth to a healthy daughter, Lucy. Due to the numerous health issues she experienced during the pregnancy, she subsequently had to relearn to walk and talk. Lucy told The Virginian Pilot "I was inside my mother's stomach when she had her stroke [...] The doctors said it would take my mother two years to recover. My father taught my mother to speak, every single day." After her recovery, she was nominated for an Oscar for her 1968 performance in The Subject Was Roses.

In 1983, following Dahl's 11-year affair with Felicity D'Abreu, a set designer he met when she worked with Neal on a Maxim Coffee advertisement, Neal's marriage ended in divorce. She returned to live in the US. In her autobiography, As I Am (1988), Neal wrote: "A strong positive mental attitude will create more miracles than any wonder drug."

== Death ==
Neal died at her home in Edgartown, Martha's Vineyard, Massachusetts, on August 8, 2010, from lung cancer. She was 84 years old.

She had become a Catholic four months before she died and was buried in the Abbey of Regina Laudis in Bethlehem, Connecticut, where the actress Dolores Hart, her friend since the early 1960s, had become a nun and ultimately prioress. Neal had been a longtime supporter of the abbey's open-air theatre and arts program.

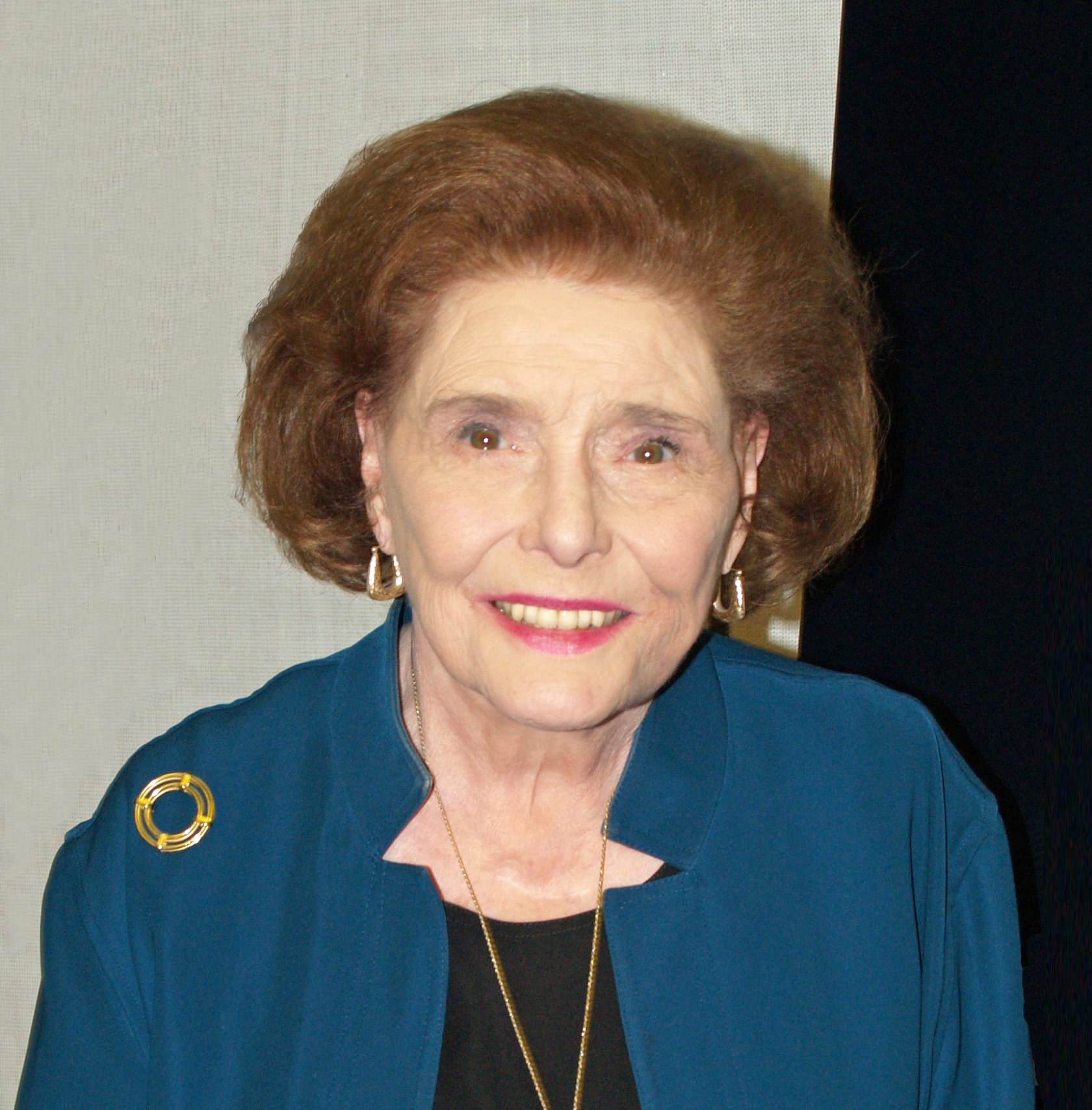
Patricia Neal at the Tribeca Film Festival (2007)

== Legacy ==
In 1978, Fort Sanders Regional Medical Center in Knoxville, Tennessee, dedicated the Patricia Neal Rehabilitation Center in her honor. The center provides intense treatment for stroke, spinal cord, and brain injury patients. It serves as part of Neal's advocacy for paralysis victims. She regularly visited the center in Knoxville, providing encouragement to its patients and staff. Neal appeared as the center's spokeswoman in advertisements until her death.

== Filmography ==
=== Film ===
Year	Film	Role	Notes
1949	John Loves Mary	Mary McKinley	
1949	The Fountainhead	Dominique Francon	
1949	It's a Great Feeling	Herself	Cameo
1949	The Hasty Heart	Sister Parker	
1950	Bright Leaf	Margaret Jane Singleton	
1950	The Breaking Point	Leona Charles	
1950	Three Secrets	Phyllis Horn	
1951	Operation Pacific	Lt. (j. g.) Mary Stuart	
1951	Raton Pass	Ann Challon	
1951	The Day the Earth Stood Still	Helen Benson	
1951	Week-End with Father	Jean Bowen	
1952	Diplomatic Courier	Joan Ross	
1952	Washington Story	Alice Kingsley	
1952	Something for the Birds	Anne Richards	
1954	Stranger from Venus	Susan North	
1954	La tua donna	Countess Germana De Torri	
1957	A Face in the Crowd	Marcia Jeffries	
1961	Breakfast at Tiffany's	Mrs. Emily Eustace "2E" Failenson	
1963	Hud	Alma Brown	Academy Award for Best Actress; BAFTA Award for Best Foreign Actress; Laurel Award for Top Female Dramatic Performance; National Board of Review Award for Best Actress; New York Film Critics Circle Award for Best Actress; Nominated—Golden Globe Award for Best Supporting Actress – Motion Picture
1964	Psyche 59	Alison Crawford	
1965	In Harm's Way	Lt. Maggie Haynes	BAFTA Award for Best Foreign Actress
1968	The Subject Was Roses	Nettie Cleary	Nominated—Academy Award for Best Actress; Nominated—Laurel Award for Top Female Dramatic Performance
1971	The Night Digger	Maura Prince	
1973	Baxter!	Dr. Roberta Clemm	
1973	Happy Mother's Day, Love George	Cara	also starring Tessa Dahl
1975	Hay que matar a B.	Julia	
1977	Nido de Viudas	Lupe	US title: Widow's Nest
1979	The Passage	Mrs. Bergson	
1981	Ghost Story	Stella Hawthorne	
1989	An Unremarkable Life	Frances McEllany	
1999	Cookie's Fortune	Jewel Mae "Cookie" Orcutt	Nominated—Las Vegas Film Critics Society Award for Best Supporting Actress
2003	Bright Leaves	Self	Documentary film
2009	Flying By	Margie	Final film role

=== Television ===
Year	Project	Role	Notes
1954	Goodyear Playhouse		Episode: "Spring Reunion"
1958	Suspicion	Paula Elgin	Episode: "Someone Is After Me"
1957–1958	Playhouse 90	Rena Menken; Margaret	Episode: "The Gentleman from Seventh Avenue"; Episode: "The Playroom"
1954–1958	Studio One in Hollywood	Caroline Mann; Miriam Leslie	Episode: "Tide of Corruption"; Episode: "A Handful of Diamonds"
1958	Pursuit	Mrs. Conrad	Episode: "The Silent Night"
1959	Rendezvous	Kate Merlin	Episode: "London-New York"
1959	Clash by Night	Mia Wilenski	
1960	The Play of the Week	Mistress; Grace Wilson	Episode: "Strindberg on Love"; Episode: "The Magic and the Loss"
1961	Special for Women: Mother and Daughter	Ruth Evans	
1962	Drama 61-67	Beebee Fenstermaker	Episode: "Drama '62: The Days and Nights of Beebee"
1962	Checkmate	Fran Davis	Episode: "The Yacht-Club Gang"
1962	The Untouchables	Maggie Storm	Episode: "The Maggie Storm Story"
1962	Westinghouse Presents: That's Where the Town Is Going	Ruby Sills	
1962	Winter Journey	Georgie Elgin	
1962	Zero One	Margo	Episode: "Return Trip"
1963	Ben Casey	Dr. Louise Chapelle	Episode: "My Enemy Is a Bright Green Sparrow"
1963	Espionage	Jeanne	Episode: "The Weakling"
1971	The Homecoming: A Christmas Story	Olivia Walton	Golden Globe Award for Best Actress in a Television Series — Drama; Nominated—Primetime Emmy Award for Outstanding Single Performance by an Actress in a Leading Role
1972	Circle of Fear	Ellen Alexander	Episode: "Time of Terror"
1974	Kung Fu	Sara Kingsley	Episode: "Blood of Dragon"
1974	Things in Their Season	Peg Gerlach	
1975	Eric	Lois Swensen	TV movie
1975	Little House on the Prairie	Julia Sanderson	Episode: "Remember Me"
1975	Movin' On	Maddie	Episode: "Prosperity #1"
1976	The American Woman: Portraits of Courage	Narrator	
1977	Tail Gunner Joe	Sen. Margaret Chase Smith	Nominated—Primetime Emmy Award for Outstanding Performance by a Supporting Actress in a Comedy or Drama Special
1978	A Love Affair: The Eleanor and Lou Gehrig Story	Mrs. Gehrig	
1978	The Bastard	Marie Charboneau	
1979	All Quiet on the Western Front	Paul's Mother	Nominated—Primetime Emmy Award for Outstanding Supporting Actress in a Limited Series or a Special
1984	Glitter	Madame Lil	Episode: "Pilot"
1984	Love Leads the Way: A True Story	Mrs. Frank	TV movie
1984	Shattered Vows	Sister Carmelita	TV movie
1990	Caroline?	Miss Trollope	TV movie
1990	Murder, She Wrote	Milena Maryska	Episode: "Murder in F Sharp"
1992	A Mother's Right: The Elizabeth Morgan Story	Antonia Morgan	
1993	Heidi	Grandmother	

=== Stage ===
Run	Play	Role	Notes
November 20, 1946 – April 26, 1947	Another Part of the Forest	Regina Hubbard	Tony Award for Best Supporting or Featured Actress in a Play; Theatre World Award
December 18, 1952 – May 30, 1953	The Children's Hour	Martha Dobie	
October 17, 1955 – December 31, 1955	A Roomful of Roses	Nancy Fallon	
October 19, 1959 – July 1, 1961	The Miracle Worker	Kate Keller	

== Bibliography ==
- Encyclopedia of Kentucky. New York, New York: Somerset Publishers. 1987. pp. 182–183. ISBN 0-403-09981-1.
- Neal, Patricia (1988). As I Am: An Autobiography. New York, New York: Simon & Schuster. ISBN 0-671-62501-2.
- Shearer, Stephen Michael (2006). Patricia Neal: An Unquiet Life. Lexington, KY: University Press of Kentucky. ISBN 0-8131-2391-7.
