= Packard, Kentucky =

- Ghost town
- Location within Kentucky
- Coordinates: 36°40′03″N 84°03′21″W
- Country: United States
- State: Kentucky
- County: Whitley
- Elevation: 1,076 ft (328 m)
- GNIS feature ID: 514412

Packard is a ghost town in Whitley County, Kentucky, United States. Packard was located 7 miles (11 km) southeast of Williamsburg. It was founded as a mining camp by the Thomas B. Mahan family around 1900. Packard's population is thought to have reached at one point nearly 400 residents. The community was a coal town which served the Packard Coal Company; the community and the company were named after Whitley County school teacher Amelia Packard. Packard once had a railway station on the Louisville and Nashville Railroad as well as a post office, which opened on November 27, 1908.

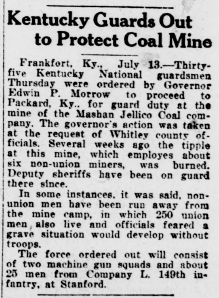
Governor Morrow sent National Guard to Packard. July 13, 1922.

In 1917, during an extended national period of labor strife, a correspondent to the United Mine Workers Journal describing conditions in Packard stated that local miners had "only one store within two miles of us, and that is the company store, and we are eighteen miles from the main line, up a dark hollow surrounded by big mountains, and you can imagine how men have to live because of the ungodly prices we have to pay. So we are praying that God will help us. Sanitary conditions are bad."

In 1920, however, when three Packard mines were inspected for the Kentucky Department of Mines the inspector found conditions in and around these mines to be satisfactory.

In 1922 two National Guard gunner squads were sent to Packard to protect the mines from aggrieved mineworkers, several weeks after a tipple at the mine had been burned.

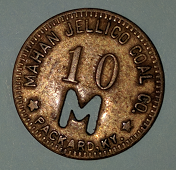
Company scrip issued by a Packard Kentucky mining company.

Actress Patricia Neal was born in Packard in 1926.

The town survived until the mid-1940s when the coal resources which had been its lifeblood finally gave out. The community is now abandoned.
