= Wild Child (film) =

2008 film by Nick Moore

- UK theatrical release poster
- Directed by: Nick Moore
- Written by: Lucy Dahl
- Produced by: Tim Bevan; Eric Fellner; Diana Phillips
- Starring: Emma Roberts; Natasha Richardson; Shirley Henderson; Alex Pettyfer; Aidan Quinn
- Cinematography: Chris Seager
- Edited by: Simon Cozens
- Music by: Michael Price
- Production companies: StudioCanal; Relativity Media; Working Title Films
- Distributed by: Universal Pictures (International); StudioCanal (France)
- Release date: 15 August 2008 (United Kingdom)
- Running time: 98 minutes
- Countries: United Kingdom; United States; France
- Language: English
- Budget: $20 million
- Box office: $21.9 million

Wild Child is a 2008 teen comedy film directed by Nick Moore, written by Lucy Dahl, and starring Emma Roberts, Natasha Richardson, Shirley Henderson, Alex Pettyfer and Aidan Quinn, with Georgia King, Kimberley Nixon, Juno Temple, Linzey Cocker and Sophie Wu.

Poppy Moore is a wealthy and spoiled American girl who is sent to a boarding school in England by her widowed father, where she soon learns the true meaning of life and friendship.

This was Richardson's final film role to be released during her lifetime, as she died seven months after its release. Since its initial release, the film has gained a substantial cult following, being particularly popular in the UK where the film is set.

== Plot ==
Spoiled and rebellious Poppy Moore from Malibu, California, damages and discards her widowed father Gerry's new girlfriend Rosemary's belongings. The furious Gerry sends Poppy to the English boarding school Abbey Mount, hoping that something will change. She is warmly greeted by the headmistress Mrs. Kingsley, but with disdain by head girl Harriet Bentley.

Poppy unhappily learns the bedrooms are shared and meets Kate, Josie, Kiki and Jennifer Logan, also known as "Drippy". Initially hostile towards them, her behaviour gets everyone detention when she insults the Matron, who also confiscates their cellphones. Poppy reveals to Kate that her mother died when she was 11. Kate loans her actual cellphone to message Ruby, her friend from back home, who is secretly cheating with Poppy's boyfriend Roddy. Her roommates try to help Poppy get expelled from the school through doing several pranks, which gradually brings them closer. None of their plans work, so they have Poppy seduce Mrs. Kingsley's son Freddie, who is off-limits for the female students.

The girls go into town for shopping, then take Poppy to a hair salon and restore her natural brunette hair. At the school dance, Freddie rejects Harriet to dance with Poppy, to Harriet's dismay. After Poppy trips on the dancefloor, Freddie takes her outside, then asks her out. Poppy soon discovers her newfound talent for lacrosse, becoming the team captain. After weeks of practicing and improving their skills, the team advances to the finals for the first time since 1976. Poppy and Freddie later go for a countryside drive and kiss. Upon returning to school, she finds her roommates reading an email allegedly written by her, suggesting she was only friends with them to get herself expelled and return to Malibu.

Poppy insists she did not write the emails, but the girls refuse to listen and walk out on her. Freddie receives a similar email, and reacts similarly. With no one to turn to, Poppy sneaks into the kitchen to call Ruby, who accidentally reveals her affair with Roddy and hangs up on her. Playing with her lighter, Poppy accidentally sets a curtain on fire. Hearing footsteps, she quickly puts it out and runs back to her bedroom. A few minutes later, Drippy sees the curtains engulfed in flames and is locked inside the freezer. Poppy is awoken by an explosion, sees the growing fire and immediately wakes the school. When everyone realizes Drippy is missing, Poppy rescues her from the freezer, as she'd seen her in it before. After the fire is extinguished, Freddie finds her lighter and gives it to her, refusing to hear any explanation.

Realizing she no longer wants to leave, Poppy writes an apology letter to Freddie and accepts responsibility for the fire. Afterwards, she finds her late mother in the 1976 Abbey Mount lacrosse team photo and realizes she was an alumna. While Poppy awaits for the Honour Court to determine if she should be expelled, Freddie finds her crying, realizes the fire was an accident, and forgives her. Meanwhile, Drippy reads in Poppy's diary how much Poppy likes them, and Kiki discovers that the emails were sent long after Poppy had left for her date and that it was actually Harriet who wrote them. At the fact-finding trial, Poppy gives her testimony and Harriet manipulates the court, determined to prove Poppy's guilt. While the students stand up in support of Poppy, Harriet bursts into a tirade and mentions Poppy's lighter. As no lighter was ever mentioned, Harriet has to admit to restarting the fire after Poppy had put it out; Harriet is expelled and Poppy is exonerated.

At the lacrosse finals, Gerry is taken aback by Poppy's dramatic change in personality and how much she resembles her mother. Abbey Mount wins the lacrosse championship and Poppy reconciles with her father. The next morning, Harriet prepares to leave with her father as her former friends toss dead pheasants onto her. Several months later, Poppy and Freddie have resumed their relationship, and she invites her roommates to a pool party at her Malibu mansion. She ignores a phone call from Ruby (now aware Ruby wasn't the good friend she thought she was) and the girls prepare to jump into the ocean off the same cliff that helped Poppy towards changing herself for the better and making proper friends.

== Cast ==
- Emma Roberts as Poppy Moore, a wealthy, rebellious and spoiled girl living in Malibu
- Natasha Richardson as Mrs. Kingsley, Freddie's mother and the headmistress of Abbey Mount
- Shirley Henderson as Matron
- Alex Pettyfer as Freddie Kingsley, Mrs. Kingsley's son and Poppy's love interest
- Nick Frost as Mr. Christopher, the hairdresser
- Aidan Quinn as Gerry Moore, Poppy's widowed father
- Georgia King as Harriet Bentley, the "queen bee" of Abbey Mount
- Kimberley Nixon as Kate, Poppy's roommate
- Juno Temple as Jennifer "Drippy" Logan, Poppy's roommate
- Selina Cadell as Mrs. Loughton
- Daisy Donovan as Miss Sara Rees-Withers, the sports mistress
- Jason Watkins as Mr. Roger Nellist, the French teacher
- Linzey Cocker as Josie, Poppy's roommate
- Sophie Wu as Kiki, Poppy's roommate
- Shelby Young as Ruby, Poppy's best friend from Malibu
- Johnny Pacar as Roddy, Poppy's boyfriend from Malibu
- Ruby Thomas as Jane, Harriet's friend/lackey
- Eleanor Turner-Moss as Charlotte, Harriet's friend/lackey
- Lexi Ainsworth as Molly Moore, Poppy's sister
- Kelsey Sanders as Abbey Mount student
- Daisy Bevan (uncredited)

== Production ==
The interiors of the boarding school were filmed at Cobham Hall in Kent. The facade of the school was filmed at Balls Park. Filming also took place at 82 Main Street, 84 Main Street, 117 Main Street, and at the Brontë Parsonage Museum in Haworth, Keighley, Bradford, in Harrogate, and at Robin Hood's Bay in North Yorkshire.

== Reception ==
Wild Child was released in the United Kingdom on 15 August 2008, taking fifth place at the box office with $2,196,366 from 359 cinemas with an average of $6,118. In its fourth weekend, it dropped to twelfth place. As of November 2008, Wild Child had grossed $8,235,794. In Australia, Wild Child was released 18 September, taking fourth place with only 93 cinemas and making $315,114. The following week, it made a 60% increase with $566,918 but still slipped to 6th place. On 16 October, Wild Child fell to 11th. As of November 2008, Wild Child had grossed US$3,268,424 (A$4,236,579) in Australia. The film has been released in many other countries, proving popular in some: the Netherlands ($1,553,825) and not so popular in others. The film has grossed a worldwide total of $21,972,336. Universal had planned a North American release in the summer of 2009, but canceled it and chose to release the film directly to DVD.

=== Critical response ===
Wild Child has a 38% approval rating at Rotten Tomatoes, based on 26 reviews with an average rating of 4.8/10. The website's critical consensus reads, "More mild than wild. This tween comedy mess falls flat on its face due to poor characters, poor direction and poor jokes".

The Sun Online gave the film 2/5 saying "WILD? More like mild, unless you think short skirts and 'horse face' put-downs are outrageous." Urban Cinefile gave Wild Child a much more favourable review, stating "The film has an energy and honesty about it: it's lively, funny and smart and the characters are appealing."

Rating the film 2 out of 5 stars, The Guardian's Peter Bradshaw deemed the film's story and characters "amiable enough, but still a bit tame" compared to films such as Clueless and Freaky Friday. Describing Wild Child as "A tweenie comedy with an uplifting American-style sports movie awkwardly bolted on", David Gritten of The Daily Telegraph considered the film to be "a mess" with predictable plot twists and inferior to the film Angus, Thongs and Perfect Snogging. In a mostly positive review for Variety, Leslie Felperin wrote that Dahl's script "puts more emphasis on character development and plot mechanics than the recent, slapstick-laden, girls’-school-set St. Trinian's, and still manages to have funnier one-liners". Felperin also found that the film's "third-act endorsement of female friendship turns out to be surprisingly affecting, despite obvious sentimentality." Meanwhile, Jack Wilson of The Age took a different view of the characters' development, finding that Dahl's screenplay "dwells unpleasantly on cruelty and humiliation, and finally Poppy does little more than exchange one form of snobbery for another."

== DVD release ==
Wild Child was released on DVD in the United Kingdom on 8 December 2008. In Australia, it was released on 15 January 2009. In the United States, it was released directly to DVD on 17 November 2009.

== Soundtrack ==
Wild Child

Soundtrack album by various artists
- Released: 18 August 2008
- Recorded: 2007–2008
- Genre: Pop
- Length: 48:32
- Label: Polydor

Wild Child: The Movie Soundtrack Party Album is a soundtrack album by the film of the same name, released in the United Kingdom and Australia on 18 August 2008. In the United States, the soundtrack wasn't released.

Track listing

No.	Title	Performer(s)	Length
1.	"Shut Up and Drive"	Rihanna	3:10
2.	"Let Me Think About It"	Ida Corr and Fedde le Grand	3:15
3.	"About You Now"	Sugababes	3:21
4.	"Say It Right"	Nelly Furtado	2:19
5.	"I Know UR Girlfriend Hates Me"	Annie	2:44
6.	"If This Is Love"	The Saturdays	3:14
7.	"Heartbreaker" (featuring Cheryl Cole)	will.i.am	4:05
8.	"Sweet About Me"	Gabriella Cilmi	3:38
9.	"Can't Speak French"	Girls Aloud	3:15
10.	"Murder on the Dancefloor"	Sophie Ellis-Bextor	4:06
11.	"Ice Cream"	New Young Pony Club	3:53
12.	"Kiss with a Fist"	Florence and the Machine	3:15
13.	"Foundations"	Kate Nash	3:21
14.	"You Think I Don't Care"	Jack McManus	2:19
15.	"Come Around" (featuring Timbaland)	M.I.A.	2:44
16.	"Tambourine"	Eve	3:14
17.	"Real Wild Child"	Sarah Harding	4:05
18.	"Wild Child"	The Cat Eat Cat Dog Game	3:38
Total length:			48:32

Other songs non-included

The following songs appeared in the movie and trailers, although they were not included on the soundtrack for the film, due to licensing restrictions:

- "Angels" – Robbie Williams
- "Black Gloves" – Goose
- "Chasing Pavements" – Adele
- "Heaven Is a Place on Earth" – Belinda Carlisle
- "I Got It from My Mama" – will.i.am
- "Real Wild Child" – Everlife
- "Roadkill Morning" – Children of Bodom
- "Set 'Em Up" – Imran Hanif
- "You Think I Don't Care" – Jack McManus
- "Surrender Your Groove" – Geri Halliwell
- "Toxic" (instrumental) – Britney Spears
