= Nancy Ekholm Burkert =

American artist and illustrator

- Born: February 16, 1933 (age 93)
- Education: University of Wisconsin, Madison
- Known for: Children's book illustration

Nancy Ekholm Burkert (born February 16, 1933) is an American artist and illustrator. Her most celebrated work is the picture book Snow White and the Seven Dwarfs (1972), which was a New York Times Notable Book and a Caldecott Honor Book (one runner-up for the Caldecott Medal).

== Biography ==
Burkert was born in Sterling, Colorado, and moved with her family to Wisconsin in 1945. She received both her bachelor's and master's degrees from the University of Wisconsin, Madison.

Burkert's first illustration work was for James and the Giant Peach in 1961.

In 1982, she was co-author of a museum catalog for the Milwaukee Art Museum, on the Wisconsin artist John Wilde.

She won the Boston Globe-Horn Book Special Award for Valentine and Orson in 1990.

In 2003, she was subject of an exhibition at the Eric Carle Museum of Picture Book Art in Amherst.

She married Robert Burkert (1930-2019), a professor of Fine Art at UW-Milwaukee. Several of Robert Burkert's lithographs are in the Tate Britain collection of prints and drawings. Together they went on to have a son and daughter, with whom they spent time in Europe and at their family cottage in northern Wisconsin. The couple retired to the coastal area in historic East Orleans, Massachusetts.

== Work ==
Her early work demonstrated a command of shading and texture through pencil and charcoal, in addition to her usual media of pen and ink combined with colored pencil and watercolor. Beginning with The Nightingale and concluding with Snow White, her mastery of light, shadow and depth combined Renaissance chiaroscuro with an Oriental awareness of space in settings that were realistic in detail, yet also fanciful and timeless in content. Her later work continued this emphasis on intense, intimate detail, revealing a passion for the complexity and variety of life.

Her illustration work on Valentine & Orson was considered to be a consistently whole work of art that was remarkable for its attention to detail and luminosity.

== Illustrated works ==
- Roald Dahl, James and the Giant Peach (1961)
- Natalie Savage Carlson, Jean-Claude’s Island (1963)
- Meindert de Jong, Big Goose and the Little White Duck (1963)
- Hans Christian Andersen, The Nightingale (1965)
- John Updike, Child’s Calendar (1965)
- Edward Lear and Ogden Nash, The Scroobious Pip (1968)
- Hans Christian Andersen, The Fir Tree (1970)
- The Brothers Grimm, Snow White and the Seven Dwarfs (1972)
- David Larkin, ed., The Art of Nancy Ekholm Burkert (1977)
- Emily Dickinson, Acts of Light (1980)
- Valentine and Orson (1989), written and illustrated

== Awards ==
- 1972 New York Times Notable Book: Snow-White and the Seven Dwarfs
- 1973 Caldecott Award, Honor Book: Snow-White and the Seven Dwarfs
- 1989 Boston Globe-Horn Book Award: Valentine and Orson
- 1995 Wisconsin Library Association Wisconsin Notable Authors
