= Josh Spero =

British journalist and author

- Education: University College School
- Alma mater: Magdalen College, Oxford
- Employer: Financial Times

Josh Spero is a British journalist and author. He is acting associate editor for the Financial Times Weekend Magazine and the author of Second-Hand Stories.

== Early life and education ==
Spero was brought up Jewish and educated at Rosh Pinah, a Modern Orthodox Jewish primary school in Edgware, North London and University College School and read Latin and Greek at Oxford. In 2004, Spero won University Challenge as part of the Magdalen College, Oxford team, beating Gonville and Caius College, Cambridge.

== Career ==
Spero began his career as senior editor of Spear's magazine from 2008 to 2010 and editor from 2010 to 2015. From 2010 to 2013, he was an occasional contributor to The Economist. He was Tatler’s art critic from 2013 to 2018 and a freelance arts and culture writer for the Guardian, Independent, New Statesman and the Sunday Times. In 2016, he joined the Financial Times as a special reports editor and was acting transport correspondent from 2018 to 2019, before a secondment in Tokyo from 2019 to 2020.

Spero has been a contributor to the Today Programme on BBC Radio 4.

In October 2015, Spero's first book, Second-Hand Stories, was published by Unbound.

== Personal life ==
Spero has described himself as 'the gay, bookish son of a taxi driver.'
