= Leonard Logsdail =

Bespoke tailor based in New York, US (born 1950)

- Born: 11 September 1950 (age 76); London, England
- Occupation: Tailor
- Years active: 1971–present

Leonard Logsdail (born September 11, 1950, in London, England) is a bespoke tailor specializing in men's suits based in Manhattan, New York. Renowned for his high-end suits and unique Hermès silk scarf linings, he has designed for numerous films and worked with directors like Steven Spielberg, Robert De Niro, Oliver Stone, Ridley Scott and Martin Scorsese. He had cameo appearances as a tailor in The Wolf of Wall Street, Wall Street 2: Money Never Sleeps, and The Good Shepherd.

== Career ==
Logsdail left school at the age of 15 and spent 3 years in tailoring school before entering the industry with high aspirations and a passion for men's suits. At the age of 21, Logsdail started his own business and opened his doors in 1971 on Carnaby Street in London. A few years later, he moved his business to Savile Row. In 1991, Logsdail moved his business from Savile Row to midtown Manhattan, New York. His atelier has remained in the same location since 1991, at 9 East 53rd Street, New York, NY.

== Personal life ==
While his tailoring business was in London, Logsdail made business trips to the United States, where he met his future wife and married in 1988. They reside in Stamford, Connecticut and have eight children. His son, Leonard, began working with him in 2012.

== Costume and Wardrobe in Film and Television ==
Title	Year	Role	Ref(s)
All the Way	2016	Costumer	
Zoolander 2	2016	Costumer	
Bridge of Spies	2015	Costumer	
The Intern	2015	Tailor	
Spotlight	2015	Tailor	
Ricki and the Flash	2015	Costumer	
Magic Mike XXL	2015	Costumer	
Carol	2015	Costumer	
Blue Bloods	2013-2014	Costumer (two episodes)	
Winter’s Tale	2014	Costumer	
RoboCop	2014	Costumer	
Jack Ryan: Shadow Recruit	2014	Tailor	
The Wolf of Wall Street	2013	Costumer (uncredited) and acting cameo	
White House Down	2013	Costumer	
Muhammad Ali’s Greatest Fight	2013	Costumer	
The Great Gatsby	2013	Costumer	
The Dictator	2012	Costumer (uncredited)	
Tower Heist	2011	Costumer	
The Smurfs	2011	Tailor	
Mr. Popper’s Penguins	2011	Costumer	
2011 MTV Movie Awards	2011	Costumer	
Mildred Pierce	2011	Tailor (5 episodes)	
Morning Glory	2010	Tailor	
The A-Team	2010	Tailor	
Wall Street: Money Never Sleeps	2010	Costumer and acting cameo	
Shutter Island	2010	Costumer (uncredited)	
Surrogates	2009	Costumer	
The Box	2009	Costumer	
Julie & Julia	2009	Costumer (uncredited)	
The Taking of Pelham 123	2009	Costumer	
81st Academy Awards	2009	Costumer	
Lipstick Jungle	2008	Tailor (2 episodes)	
Frost/Nixon	2008	Costumer	
Deception	2008	Tailor	
American Gangster	2007	Costumer	
Perfect Stranger	2007	Costumer	
The Good Shepherd	2006	Costumer and acting cameo	
