= Louise Ivers =

Irish-American infectious disease specialist

- Born: Dublin, Ireland

Academic background
- Education: MD, University College Dublin; DTM&H, London School of Hygiene & Tropical Medicine; MPH, Harvard T.H. Chan School of Public Health

Louise Catherine Ivers is an Irish-American infectious disease specialist. She is the executive director of the Massachusetts General Hospital Center for Global Health and Professor of Medicine at Harvard Medical School. During the 2010s Haiti cholera outbreak, Ivers led a major humanitarian and public health response, resulting in increased access to HIV and TB treatment, and served as a technical advisor to the World Health Organization.

== Early life and education ==
Ivers was born and raised in Dublin, Ireland, as the middle of three children. She remained in her home country for her medical degree at University College Dublin (UCD) and a diploma in tropical medicine and hygiene from the London School of Hygiene & Tropical Medicine, before travelling to the United States for her residency in internal medicine at the Massachusetts General Hospital, a fellowship in infectious diseases at Harvard University, and Master's Degree in Public Health from the Harvard School of Public Health.

== Career ==
Ivers joined the non-profit organization, Partners In Health (PIH) in 2003 as a clinical director as it began its collaboration with the Haitian government. She helped expand the organizations reach across Haiti from a three-room clinic to several new buildings including a clinic that contains examining rooms, a laboratory, a pharmacy, a small inpatient ward, and isolation rooms for TB patients. During her time in Haiti, the country suffered a cholera outbreak and earthquake. Following the January 2010 earthquake in Haiti, she was appointed Chief of Mission for PIH and subsequently led a major humanitarian and public health response, resulting in increased access to HIV and TB treatment. In recognition of her efforts in Haiti, Ivers was honored as the 2011 Distinguished Graduate for UCD and the recipient of the Bailey K. Ashford Medal from the American Society of Tropical Medicine and Hygiene. Ivers later published a paper in 2015 showing that PIH's intervention and vaccine distribution slowed the spread of cholera in villages north of Saint-Marc. From 2015 until 2017, she was a member of the executive leadership team at PIH responsible for global strategic implementation and served as a technical advisor to the World Health Organization and the Haitian Ministry of Health.

In 2019, Ivers was elected a Member of the American Society for Clinical Investigation and was the recipient of the Leadership In Public Health Practice Award. During the COVID-19 pandemic, Ivers and Wilfredo Matias published an op-ed "calling out fundamental weaknesses in the country's public health data systems, which are unable to capture accurate data on where, why and how the virus spreads in real time." She later urged the Governor of Massachusetts, Charlie Baker, to speed up the rollout of COVID-19 vaccinations.
