= Tessa Dahl =

British author (born 1957)

- Born: Chantal Sophia Dahl; 11 April 1957 (age 69); Oxford, England
- Occupations: Novelist; journalist
- Spouses: James Kelly (divorced); Patrick Donovan (m. 1992; div. 1992)
- Partner: Julian Holloway
- Children: 4, including Sophie Dahl
- Parents: Roald Dahl; Patricia Neal
- Relatives: Olivia Dahl (sister); Theo Dahl (brother); Ophelia Dahl (sister); Lucy Dahl (sister)

Chantal Sophia "Tessa" Dahl (born 11 April 1957) is a British author and former actress. She is the daughter of British-Norwegian author Roald Dahl and American actress Patricia Neal.

Dahl was born in Oxford, the second daughter of British author Roald Dahl and American actress Patricia Neal; her elder sister Olivia died from measles in 1962. She grew up in Great Missenden, Buckinghamshire, and attended Roedean and Downe House schools, the Elizabeth Russell Cookery School and the Herbert Bergof Acting Studio.

Dahl has worked as an actress, modelled, worked at an antique shop, worked at an employment agency and written articles for Tatler before publishing her first novel, the semi-autobiographical Working For Love, in 1988. Dahl became an author of children's fiction. Her book Gwenda and the Animals won the Friends of the Earth Best Children's Book of the Year.

Dahl's relationship with actor Julian Holloway produced one daughter, model and author Sophie Dahl; the couple separated shortly afterwards. She subsequently married businessman James Kelly and had two children, Clover and Luke. She then married businessman Patrick Donovan (deceased on 7 February 2021), son of Ambassador Francis Patrick Donovan, and had one son, Ned. Dahl has also had relationships with Peter Sellers, David Hemmings, Bryan Ferry, Brian de Palma, Brian Cant and Dai Llewellyn.

== Bibliography ==
- Working for Love (1988) – an autobiographical novel; among other things, the point-of-view character has a sister who dies from measles.
- The Same But Different (1988) – picture book
- Gwenda & the Animals (1989)
- School Can Wait (1990)
- Babies, Babies, Babies (1991) – picture book
- Everywoman's Experience of Pregnancy and Birth (1994)
