= Sophie Dahl =

British author

- Born: Sophie Holloway; 15 September 1977 (age 49); London, England
- Occupations: Author; journalist
- Spouse: Jamie Cullum (m. 2010)
- Children: 2
- Parents: Tessa Dahl (mother); Julian Holloway (father)
- Relatives: Roald Dahl (maternal grandfather); Patricia Neal (maternal grandmother); Stanley Holloway (paternal grandfather)
- Writing career
- Period: Contemporary literature
- Website: sophiedahl.com

Sophie Dahl (born Sophie Holloway; born 15 September 1977) is an English writer and former fashion model. Her first book, a novella, The Man With The Dancing Eyes, was published in 2003, followed by a novel, Playing With The Grown-Ups, in 2007. In 2009, she wrote a cookbook, Miss Dahl's Voluptuous Delights, which formed the basis for the six-part BBC cooking series The Delicious Miss Dahl (2010). In 2011, her second cookbook, From Season to Season, was published.

Dahl was a British Vogue and Condé Nast Traveller contributor and editor, and is a columnist and contributing editor at House & Garden. She is also the author of three children's books published by Walker Books, including Madame Badobedah (2019).

== Early life and education ==
Dahl was born in London in 1977 to the actor Julian Holloway and the writer Tessa Dahl, who were unmarried. Dahl's parents separated shortly after her birth. Through her mother, Dahl has three half-siblings. As a child, Sophie frequently visited both her maternal and paternal grandparents' houses in Great Missenden, Buckinghamshire, and East Preston, West Sussex, respectively. Dahl has noted that her childhood was "an odd one, but with such magic". Dahl attended 10 schools and lived in 17 homes in various locations, including London, New York, and India. In her teens, she lived with her mother in Balham. At age 18, Dahl moved out to share a flat in Kensal Rise with school friend and fellow model Iris Palmer.

== Writing career ==
In 2003, Dahl published her first book, an illustrated novella and Times bestseller, The Man with the Dancing Eyes (Bloomsbury Publishing). From 2005, she was a contributing editor and regular columnist at Men's Vogue, until its closure in 2008. Her next books were Playing with the Grown-Ups (2007) and two cookbooks, Miss Dahl's Voluptuous Delights (2009) and From Season To Season (2011). She was a contributor to an anthology, Truth or Dare, edited by Justine Picardie, which included works by Zoë Heller and William Fiennes. She also provided introductions to the Puffin Classic new edition of The Secret Garden by Frances Hodgson Burnett, and the Virago Press re-issue of Stella Gibbons' 1938 novel Nightingale Wood – both released in April 2009 – and Nancy Mitford's Don't Tell Alfred, reissued by Penguin in March 2010.

In March and April 2010, a six-part cookery series, "The Delicious Miss Dahl", which Dahl wrote and presented, was broadcast on BBC 2. She wrote and presented a social history documentary about the Victorian cook Isabella Beeton, which was transmitted on BBC 2 on 29 September 2011.

Dahl was a contributing editor at British magazine Vogue for a decade, writing about subjects from cultural identity and the journey of refugees to Britain to the Proustian response to scent, winning a Jasmine Award for her column. She is a contributing editor at Condé Nast Traveller, and has written essays for amongst others, The Guardian, the American edition of Vogue, The Observer and The New York Times Magazine.

It was announced in the Bookseller in 2019 that Dahl had been signed to a four-book deal with Walker Books. The first of these, Madame Badobedah, a children's picture book illustrated by Lauren O'Hara, was published in October 2019 and received a number of nominations and awards, including a nomination for a Kate Greenaway Medal. It received a Parents' Choice Gold Award, and was selected as a 2019 Best Children’s Book by both the Guardian and The Sunday Times. Dahl's second book with Walker, The Worst Sleepover in the World, illustrated by Luciano Lozano, was published in October 2021.

Her seventh book, and third children's book, Madame Badobedah and The Old Bones, was published by Walker Books in October 2023. It was selected as one of the best books of 2023 by Waterstones and was nominated for a Carnegie Medal. A third instalment in the series, Madame Badobedah Sets Sail, illustrated by Lauren O'Hara, is scheduled for publication by Walker Books in autumn 2027.

In 2020, Dahl became a monthly columnist and contributing editor at House & Garden magazine.

== Modelling career ==
Dahl started modelling at the age of 18 after a chance meeting with Isabella Blow, who was then an editor at British Vogue. The following year she made her debut on the catwalk at Lainey Keogh's London fashion week show, modelling Autumn/Winter knitwear. She walked for Nina Ricci, Fendi, Christian Dior couture, Christian Lacroix, and Jean Paul Gaultier. She went on to appear in advertising campaigns for Versace, Alexander McQueen, Boucheron, Pringle, Godiva, Banana Republic, Gap and Boodles amongst others. She appeared on multiple covers of both British and Italian Vogue, along with the covers of Harpers Bazaar, Elle, Numéro, d - la Repubblica delle donne, and Arena, and in editorials for US Vogue, Visionaire, Dazed, i-D, The Face, W, and Allure, amongst others.

During her career as a model, Dahl worked with photographers including Richard Avedon, Peter Lindbergh, Tim Walker, Steven Klein and Steven Meisel. In 2000, Dahl became the face of Yves Saint-Laurent's Opium. The ad campaign was art-directed by Tom Ford and shot by Steven Meisel. Dahl's nude images in British advertisements caused a near-record number of complaints to the UK's Advertising Standards Authority.

== Personal life ==
Dahl's paternal grandparents were the actor Stanley Holloway and his wife, Violet (née Lane), a former chorus dancer. Dahl's paternal lineage has been associated with the stage since at least 1850; Charles Bernard (1830–1894), a great-uncle to Stanley Holloway, was a Shakespearean actor and theatre manager in London and the English provinces. Bernard's son, Oliver Percy Bernard (1881–1939), was an architect and scenic designer, responsible for the sets for Sir Thomas Beecham's Ring Cycle at Covent Garden. Through Bernard, Dahl is related to his sons, the poet and translator Oliver Bernard, the photographer Bruce Bernard, and the writer Jeffrey Bernard. Dahl's maternal grandparents were the author Roald Dahl (who named the character Sophie from his novel The BFG after her) and the American actress Patricia Neal.

On 9 January 2010, Dahl married the singer Jamie Cullum. They had their first child, a daughter, Lyra, in 2011. The couple had a second daughter, Margot, in 2013. The family live in Buckinghamshire.

Dahl is an ambassador for Place2Be, a charity which provides mental health support and advocacy in schools across the UK.

== Bibliography ==
=== Novels and novellas ===
- The Man with the Dancing Eyes. Ted Smart. 2003. ISBN 9781582343426.
- Playing with the Grown-ups. Anchor. 2007. ISBN 9780307388353.

=== Cookbooks ===
- Miss Dahl's Voluptuous Delights: Recipes for Every Season, Mood, and Appetite. William Morrow Cookbooks. 2009. ISBN 9780061450990.
- Miss Dahl's Guide to All Things Lovely. HarperCollins. 2011. ISBN 9780007340514.
- From Season to Season: A Year in Recipes. Ten Speed Press. 2012. ISBN 9781607741787.

=== Picture books ===
- Madame Badobedah. Walker Books. 2019. ISBN 9781406384406.
- The Worst Sleepover in the World. Walker Books. 2021. ISBN 9781406384413.
- Madame Badobedah and the Old Bones. Walker Books. 2023. ISBN 9781406384420.
- Madame Badobedah Sets Sail, illustrated by Lauren O'Hara, Walker Books, 2027

== Sources ==
- Holloway, Stanley; Richards, Dick (1967). Wiv a little bit o' luck: The life story of Stanley Holloway. London: Frewin. OCLC 3647363.
