= Wade-Dahl-Till valve =

Cerebral shunt

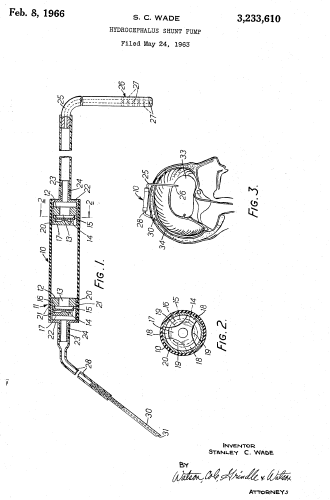
Illustration of valve, from patent application

The Wade-Dahl-Till (WDT) valve is a cerebral shunt developed in 1962 by hydraulic engineer Stanley Wade, author Roald Dahl, and neurosurgeon Kenneth Till.

In 1960, Dahl's son Theo developed hydrocephalus after being struck by a taxicab. A standard Holter shunt was installed to drain excess fluid from his brain. However, the shunt jammed too often, causing pain and blindness, risking brain damage and requiring emergency surgery. Till, a neurosurgeon at London's Great Ormond Street Hospital for children, determined that debris accumulated in the hydrocephalic ventricles could clog the slits in the Holter valves, especially with patients such as Theo who had bad bleeding in the brain and brain damage.

Dahl knew Wade to be an expert in precision hydraulic engineering, from their shared hobby of flying model aircraft. (In addition to building his own model aircraft engines, Wade ran a factory at High Wycombe for producing precision hydraulic pumps.) With Dahl coordinating the efforts of the neurosurgeon and the hydraulic engineer, the team developed a new mechanism using two metal discs, each in a restrictive housing at the end of a short silicone rubber tube. Fluid moving under pressure from below pushed the discs against the tube to prevent retrograde flow; pressure from above moved each disc to the "open" position. As Till reported in The Lancet, the invention was characterised by "low resistance, ease of sterilisation, no reflux, robust construction, and negligible risk of blockage".

By the time the device was perfected, Theo had healed to the point at which it was no longer necessary to implant the shunt in his skull. However, several thousand other children around the world benefited from the WDT valve before medical technology progressed beyond it. The co-inventors agreed never to accept any profit from the invention.
