= Church of St Peter and St Paul, Great Missenden =

Grade I historic church in Buckinghamshire, England

Church of St Peter and St Paul
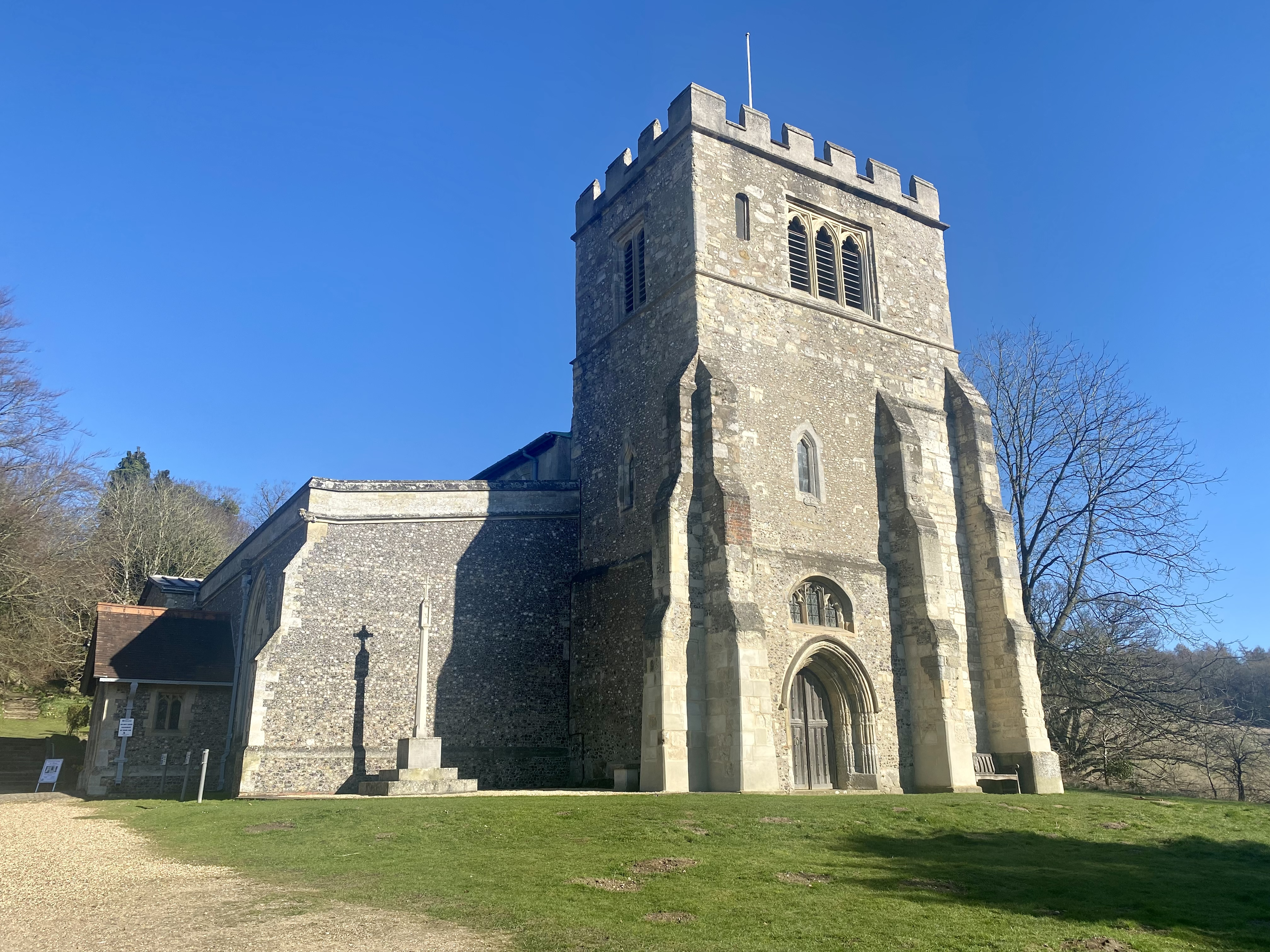
- Church of St Peter and St Paul
- 51.7008°N 0.6988°W
- OS grid reference: SP 90015 01038
- Country: England
- Denomination: Church of England
- Churchmanship: Liberal Catholic
- Website: St Peter and St Paul

History
- Dedication: St Peter and St Paul

Architecture
- Heritage designation: Grade I listed

Specifications
- Capacity: 250

Administration
- Province: Canterbury
- Diocese: Oxford
- Archdeaconry: Buckingham
- Deanery: Wendover
- Parish: Great Missenden with Ballinger and Little Hampden

Clergy
- Bishop: The Right Revd Dr Alan Wilson
- Vicar: The Revd Malcolm Chalmers

The Church of St Peter and St Paul is a Church of England parish church situated in Great Missenden, Buckinghamshire, England. The church is listed Grade I on the National Heritage List for England.

The church primarily dates back to the 14th century, with significant enhancements made in the 15th century. Notably, the tower has an asymmetrical lower level due to its southward extension after the Reformation. This extension, featuring a nearly 14-foot thick wall, was constructed to support a new belfry, which housed five bells that had been relocated from the dissolved Missenden Abbey. The church underwent restoration, and its northeast aisle was rebuilt between 1899 and 1900 by the architect John Oldrid Scott.

Constructed mainly from flint rubble, the church also incorporates sarsen stone footings and various dressings made from ashlar, contributing to its distinctive appearance. Some sections are roughcast, adding to the historical character of the building.

The churchyard of St Peter and St Paul is the final resting place of the famous British writer Roald Dahl, who lived in nearby Gipsy House. Additionally, the churchyard contains two Commonwealth War Graves Commission memorials, honoring Rifleman Jeffrey James Whitney of the Rifle Brigade, who died in September 1940 at the age of 20, and Major Basil Arthur Parnwell of the Royal Fusiliers (City of London Regiment), who died in July 1947.

== See also ==
- Great Missenden War Memorial
