= George's Marvellous Medicine =

1981 children's book written by Roald Dahl

- British first edition hardback
- Author: Roald Dahl
- Illustrator: Quentin Blake
- Language: English
- Genre: Children's novel, fantasy
- Publisher: Jonathan Cape (UK hardback); Alfred Knopf (US hardback); Puffin Books (paperback)
- Publication date: 10 January 1981
- Publication place: United Kingdom
- Media type: Print (Hardback, Paperback)
- Pages: 96

George's Marvellous Medicine (known as George's Marvelous Medicine in the US) is a children's novel written by Roald Dahl and illustrated by Quentin Blake. First published by Jonathan Cape in 1981, it features George Kranky, an eight-year-old boy who concocts his own miracle elixir to replace his tyrannical grandmother's regular prescription medicine.

Being a medical expert was one of what Dahl called his "dreams of glory": he had enormous respect for doctors and particularly those who pioneered new treatments. He dedicated the book to "doctors everywhere". In 2003, it was listed at number 134 on the BBC's The Big Read poll.

== Plot ==
While eight-year-old George Kranky's parents are out grocery shopping, his elderly maternal grandmother bosses him around and bullies him. She intimidates him by saying that she likes to eat insects and he wonders briefly if she's a witch. As a punishment for her regular abuse, he decides to make a magic medicine to replace her old prescription one. He collects a variety of ingredients from around the family farm including deodorant and shampoo from the bathroom, floor polish from the laundry room, horseradish sauce and gin from the kitchen, animal medicines, engine oil and anti-freeze from the garage, and brown paint to mimic the colour of the original medicine.

After cooking the ingredients in the kitchen, George gives it as medicine to his grandmother, who grows as tall as the house, bursting through the roof. When she doesn't believe it was him who made her do so, he proves it to her by feeding the medicine to one of his father's chickens, which grows ten times its original size. As they return home, Mr. and Mrs. Kranky can't believe their eyes when they see the giant chicken and grandmother. Mr. Kranky grows very excited at the thought of rearing giant animals. He has George feed the medicine to the rest of the farm's animals, causing them to become giants as well. However, his grandmother begins complaining about being ignored and stuck in the house, so Mr. Kranky hires a crane to remove her from it. Her extreme height has her sleeping in the barn for the next few nights.

The following morning, Mr. Kranky is still excited about George's medicine and announces that he and George shall make gallons of it to sell to farmers around the world, which would make his family rich. George attempts to recreate it but is unable to remember all the ingredients. The second version makes a chicken's legs grow extremely long, and the third elongates another one's neck to bizarre proportions. The fourth has the opposite effect of the first and makes animals shrink. George's grandmother, now even more angry because she has to sleep in the barn, storms over and starts complaining loudly that she's once again sick of being ignored. She sees the cup of medicine in George's hand and erroneously mistakes it for tea. Much to his and Mrs. Kranky's horror, and Mr. Kranky's delight, she drinks the entire cup and shrinks so much that she vanishes completely. Mrs. Kranky is initially shocked, confused, and distraught about her mother's sudden and strange disappearance, but soon accepts that she was becoming a nuisance anyway. In the last page, George is left to think about the implications of his actions, feeling as though they had granted him access to the edge of a magic world.

=== Ingredients ===
The original ingredients in order are as follows:

- Golden gloss hair shampoo
- Toothpaste
- Superfoam shaving soap
- Vitamin enriched face cream
- Scarlet nail varnish
- Hair remover
- Dishworth's famous dandruff cure
- Brillident false teeth cleaner
- Nevermore ponking deodorant spray
- Liquid paraffin
- Helga's hairset
- Perfume: 'Flowers of turnips'
- Pink plaster powder
- Lipsticks
- Superwhite washing powder
- Waxwell floor polish
- Flea powder for dogs
- Canary seed
- Dark tan shoe polish
- Gin
- Curry powder
- Mustard powder
- 'Extra hot' chilli sauce
- Black peppercorns
- Horseradish sauce
- Orange powder for foul chickens
- Purple pills for hoarse horses
- Thick yellowish liquid for cows
- Red sheep dip
- Green pig pills for swine sickness
- Engine oil
- Antifreeze
- Grease
- Dark brown gloss paint

In the cookbook Roald Dahl's Completely Revolting Recipes, collaborated on by Felicity Dahl and chefs Josie Fison and Lori-Ann Newman, George's medicine was adapted into "George's Marvellous Medicine Chicken Soup", the ingredients of which included chicken, onions, mushrooms, leeks, and tarragon.

== Influence ==
Dahl was influenced by Lewis Carroll's Alice's Adventures in Wonderland, with the "Drink Me" episode inspiring a scene in George's Marvellous Medicine where the tyrannical grandmother drinks a potion concocted by George and is blown up to the size of a farmhouse.

== Safety concerns ==
Though it was a popular book for reading to children in primary school, great care was taken by teachers to warn children to not try to re-create the medicine at home due to the hazardous nature of some of its ingredients. There is a disclaimer warning before the story stating "Warning to Readers: Do not try to make George's Marvellous Medicine yourselves at home. It could be dangerous." In 2020, a team of British researchers performed a toxicological investigation into the potion and all 34 of its ingredients. They reported in the BMJ that if ingested, it would cause vomiting, kidney injury, convulsions, and other severe health problems, including "the most likely clinical outcome", death. "The overall outcome for Grandma would be fatal catastrophic physiological collapse," they wrote.

== 2023 censorship controversy ==
Despite Roald Dahl having enjoined his publishers not to "so much as change a single comma in one of my books", in February 2023 Puffin Books, a division of Penguin Books, announced it would be re-writing portions of many of Dahl's children's novels, changing the language to, in the publisher's words, "ensure that it can continue to be enjoyed by all today". The decision was met with sharp criticism from groups and public figures including authors Salman Rushdie and Christopher Paolini, former British prime minister Rishi Sunak, Queen Camilla, Kemi Badenoch, PEN America, and actor Brian Cox. Dahl's publishers in the United States, France, and the Netherlands announced they had declined to incorporate the changes.

In George's Marvellous Medicine, more than fifty changes were made, including removing references to the deadly power of the marvellous medicine, removing the acknowledgement that a footstool is used by a woman because she is short, changing references to "pale brown teeth" to "rotting teeth" and obscuring references to things traditionally associated with housewives (such as using a sink or dressing table).

Original text	2023 text
There was a round cardboard carton labeled flea powder for dogs. keep well away from the dog's food, it said, because this powder, if eaten, will make the dog explode.	There was a round cardboard carton labeled flea powder for dogs. keep well away from the dog's food, it said, because this powder, if eaten, will make the dog hop like a flea.

== Television version ==
Rik Mayall read the book for the BBC's Jackanory children's programme in 1986, in a widely acclaimed performance.

== Audio versions ==
The book has been recorded several times, including:

- 1987, adapted and narrated by Edward Phillips for Rainbow Theatre (BOW 139) and featuring Ben Fairman as George, Patricia Hayes as Grandma, Steven Pacey as Mr. Kranky and Carole Boyd as Mrs. Kranky
- 1987, by Richard Griffiths for Tempo Story Tapes (TST 8030)
- 1998, by June Whitfield for Puffin Audiobooks
- 1998, 2005, adapted by Mellie Buse for Puffin Audiobooks and the Daily Mirror and featuring Christian Howes as George, Rowena Cooper as Grandma, Nigel Lambert as the Narrator, Steven Pacey as Mr. Kranky, Maggie Ollerenshaw as Mrs. Kranky and Susan Jameson
- 2007, by Richard E. Grant for Harper Childrens Audio
- 2016, by Derek Jacobi for Puffin Audiobooks.
- 2022, by Romesh Ranganathan for Penguin Audio.

== Stage adaptation ==
The actor and writer David Wood adapted the book for the stage; it was produced by the Rose Theatre Kingston and Curve Leicester, and toured the UK in 2017 and 2018.

== Editions ==
- 2007 – ISBN 978-0-141-80779-9 (audio CD read by Richard E. Grant)
- 2016 – ISBN 978-0-141-37033-0 (audio CD read by Derek Jacobi)

== See also ==
- Roald Dahl's Marvellous Medicine; title is apparently inspired by George's Marvellous Medicine.
- Gamma globulin, the medicine which would have saved Olivia Dahl.
