= Roald Dahl =

British writer and poet (1916–1990)

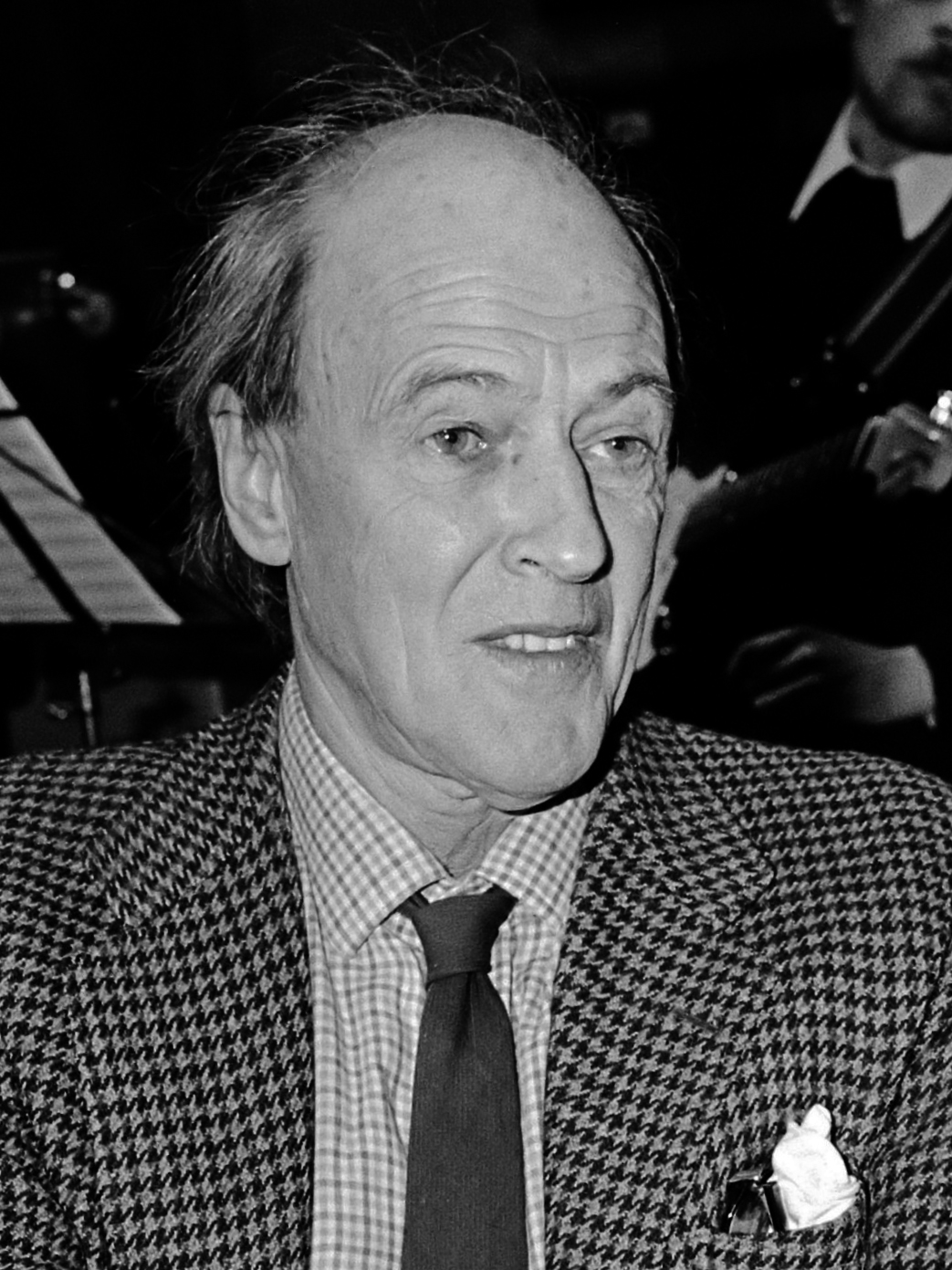
- Dahl in 1982
- Born: 13 September 1916; Cardiff, Wales
- Died: 23 November 1990 (aged 74); Oxford, England
- Burial place: Church of St Peter and St Paul, Great Missenden, England
- Occupations: Novelist; poet; screenwriter
- Spouses: Patricia Neal (m. 1953; div. 1983); Felicity Crosland (m. 1983)
- Children: Olivia; Tessa; Theo; Ophelia; Lucy
- Relatives: Sophie Dahl (granddaughter); Phoebe Dahl (granddaughter); Nicholas Logsdail (nephew)
- Writing career
- Period: 1942–1990
- Genre: Children's literature
- Military career
- Allegiance: United Kingdom
- Branch: Royal Air Force
- Service years: 1939–1946
- Rank: Squadron Leader
- Unit: No. 80 Squadron RAF
- Conflicts: Second World War; Battle of Greece; Syria–Lebanon campaign

Roald Dahl (Note: Norwegian: [ˈrùːɑɫ ˈdɑːɫ], commonly pronounced in English as /ˈroʊ.əld ˈdɑːl/ ROH-əld DAHL.) (13 September 1916 – 23 November 1990) was a British author of popular children's literature and short stories, a poet, screenwriter, and wartime fighter ace. His books have sold more than 300 million copies worldwide. He has been called "one of the greatest storytellers for children of the 20th century".

Dahl was born in Wales to affluent Norwegian immigrant parents, and lived for most of his life in England. He served in the Royal Air Force (RAF) during the Second World War. He became a fighter pilot and subsequently an intelligence officer, rising to the rank of acting wing commander. He rose to prominence as a writer in the 1940s with works for children and for adults, and he became one of the world's best-selling authors. His awards for contribution to literature include the 1983 World Fantasy Award for Life Achievement and the British Book Awards' Children's Author of the Year in 1990. In 2008, The Times placed Dahl 16th on its list of "The 50 Greatest British Writers Since 1945". In 2021, Forbes ranked him the top-earning dead celebrity.

Dahl's short stories are known for their unexpected endings, and his children's books for their unsentimental, macabre, often darkly comic mood, featuring villainous adult enemies of the child characters. The latter also champion the kindhearted and feature an underlying warm sentiment. His works for children include James and the Giant Peach; Charlie and the Chocolate Factory; Matilda; The Witches; Fantastic Mr Fox; The BFG; The Twits; George's Marvellous Medicine; and Danny, the Champion of the World. His works for older audiences include the short story collections Tales of the Unexpected and The Wonderful Story of Henry Sugar and Six More.

== Early life and education ==
=== Childhood ===
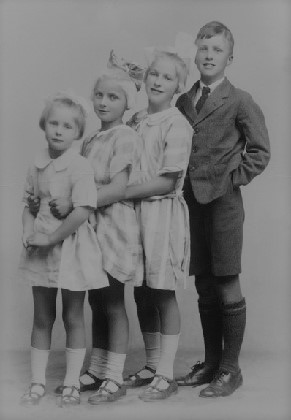
At the age of 10 with his sisters Alfhild, Else and Asta. Cardiff, 1927

Roald Dahl was born in 1916 at Villa Marie, Fairwater Road, in Llandaff, Cardiff, Wales, to Norwegian parents Harald Dahl and Sofie Magdalene Dahl née Hesselberg. Dahl's father, a wealthy shipbroker and self-made man, had emigrated to Britain from Sarpsborg, Norway, and settled in Cardiff in the 1880s with his first wife, Frenchwoman Marie Beaurin-Gresser. They had two children together (Ellen Marguerite and Louis) before her death in 1907. Roald's mother, originally from Christiania (now Oslo), belonged to a well-established Norwegian family of lawyers, wealthy merchants, estate owners and priests in the Church of Norway, and emigrated to Britain when she married his father in 1911. Dahl was named after Norwegian polar explorer Roald Amundsen. His first language was Norwegian, which he spoke at home with his parents and his sisters Astri, Alfhild, and Else. The children were raised in the Church of Norway (Lutheran), and were baptised at the Norwegian Church, Cardiff. His maternal grandmother Ellen Wallace was a granddaughter of the member of parliament Georg Wallace and a descendant of an early 18th-century Scottish immigrant to Norway.

In 1920 when Dahl was three years old, his sister Astri died from appendicitis at age seven. Several weeks later, his father died of pneumonia at age 57. Later that year, his youngest sister, Asta, was born. Upon his death, Harald Dahl left a fortune assessed for probate at £158,917 10s 0d (equivalent to £6,141,145 in 2025). Dahl's mother decided to remain in Wales instead of returning to Norway to live with relatives, as her husband had wanted their children to be educated in English schools, which he considered the world's best. When he was six years old, Dahl met his idol Beatrix Potter, author of The Tale of Peter Rabbit featuring the mischievous Peter Rabbit, the first licensed fictional character. The meeting, which took place at Potter's home, Hill Top, Lake District, north west England, was dramatised in the 2020 TV film, Roald & Beatrix: The Tail of the Curious Mouse.

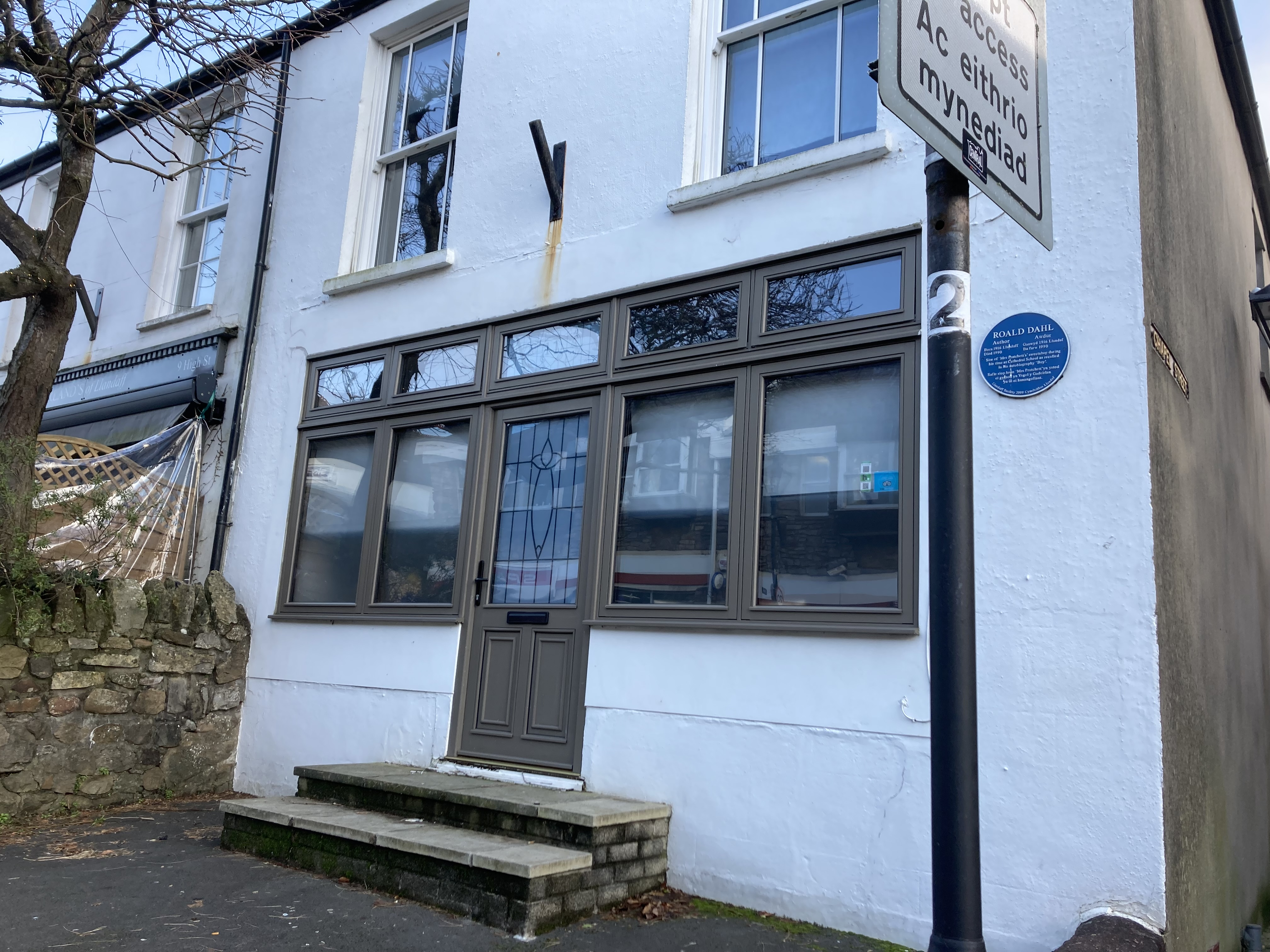
Mrs Pratchett's former sweet shop in Llandaff, Cardiff, has a blue plaque dedicated to Dahl. His autobiography Boy: Tales of Childhood recalls the prank he and his friends played on her using a jar of gobstoppers.

Dahl first attended The Cathedral School, Llandaff. At age eight, he and four of his friends were caned by the headmaster after putting a dead mouse in a jar of gobstoppers at the local sweet shop, 11 High Street, Llandaff, owned by a "mean and loathsome" old woman, Mrs Pratchett. The five boys named their prank the "Great Mouse Plot of 1924". Mrs Pratchett inspired the cruel headmistress Miss Trunchbull in Dahl's Matilda; a prank, this time in Trunchbull's water jug, would also appear in the book. Gobstoppers were a favourite sweet among British schoolboys between the two World Wars, and Dahl referred to them in his fictional Everlasting Gobstopper which was featured in Charlie and the Chocolate Factory.

Dahl transferred to St Peter's boarding school in Weston-super-Mare. His parents had wanted him to be educated at an English public school, and this proved to be the nearest because of the regular ferry link across the Bristol Channel. Dahl's time at St Peter's was unpleasant; he was very homesick and wrote to his mother every week but never revealed his unhappiness to her. After her death in 1967, he learned that she had saved every one of his letters; they were broadcast in abridged form as BBC Radio 4's Book of the Week in 2016 to mark the centenary of his birth. Dahl wrote about his time at St Peter's in his autobiography Boy: Tales of Childhood. Excelling at conkers — a traditional autumnal children's game in Britain and Ireland played using the seeds of horse chestnut trees — Dahl recalled, "at the ages of eight, nine and ten, conkers brought sunshine to our lives during the dreary autumn term".

=== Repton School ===
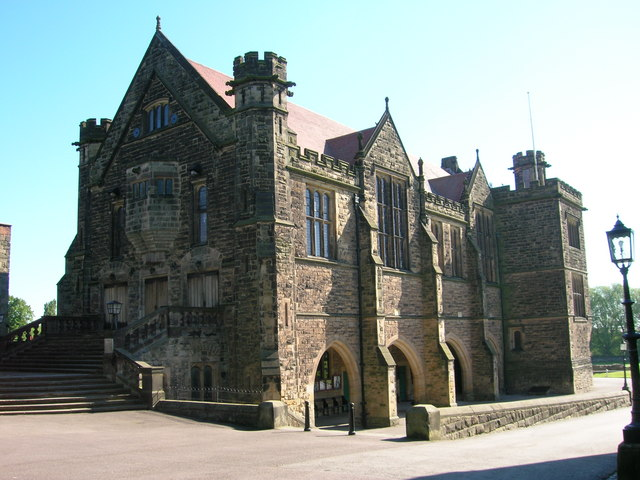
Repton School in Derbyshire, which Dahl attended from 1929 to 1934

From 1929, when he was 13, Dahl attended Repton School in Derbyshire. Dahl disliked the hazing and described an environment of ritual cruelty and status domination, with younger boys having to act as personal servants (fags) for older boys, frequently subject to terrible beatings. His biographer Donald Sturrock described these violent experiences in Dahl's early life. Dahl expresses some of these darker experiences in his writings, which is also marked by his hatred of cruelty and corporal punishment.

Dahl's autobiography, Boy: Tales of Childhood, says a friend named Michael was viciously caned by headmaster Geoffrey Fisher. In that same book, Dahl reflected: "All through my school life I was appalled by the fact that masters and senior boys were allowed literally to wound other boys, and sometimes quite severely... I couldn't get over it. I never have got over it." Fisher was later appointed Archbishop of Canterbury, and he crowned Elizabeth II in 1953. However, Dahl's biographer Jeremy Treglown says the caning took place in May 1933, a year after Fisher left Repton; the headmaster was in fact J. T. Christie, Fisher's successor as headmaster. Dahl said the incident caused him to "have doubts about religion and even about God". He viewed the caning as being the result of the headmaster's enmity towards children, an attitude Dahl would later attribute to the Grand High Witch in his dark fantasy The Witches, with the novel's main antagonist exclaiming that "children are rrreee-volting!".

Dahl was never seen as a particularly talented writer in his school years; one of his English teachers wrote in his school report, "I have never met anybody who so persistently writes words meaning the exact opposite of what is intended." He was exceptionally tall, reaching 6 feet 6 inches (1.98 m) in adult life. Dahl played sports including cricket, football and golf, and was made captain of the squash team. As well as having a passion for literature, he developed an interest in photography and often carried a camera with him.

During his years at Repton, the Cadbury chocolate company occasionally sent boxes of new chocolates to the school to be tested by pupils. Dahl dreamed of inventing a new chocolate bar that would win the praise of Mr Cadbury himself; this inspired him in writing his third children's book, Charlie and the Chocolate Factory, and to refer to chocolate in other children's books.

Throughout his childhood and adolescence, Dahl spent most summer holidays with his mother's family in Norway. He wrote about many happy memories from those visits in Boy: Tales of Childhood, such as when he replaced the tobacco in his half-sister's fiancé's pipe with goat droppings. He noted only one unhappy memory of his holidays in Norway: about age eight, he had to have his adenoids removed by a doctor, a procedure which at the time was done without anaesthesia. His childhood and first job selling kerosene in Midsomer Norton and surrounding villages in Somerset are subjects in Boy: Tales of Childhood.

=== After school ===
After finishing his schooling, in August 1934 Dahl crossed the Atlantic on the RMS Nova Scotia and hiked through Newfoundland with the British Public Schools Exploring Society.

In July 1934, Dahl joined the Shell Petroleum Company. Following four years of training in the United Kingdom, he was assigned first to Mombasa, Kenya, then to Dar es Salaam in the British colony of Tanganyika (now part of Tanzania). Dahl explains in his autobiography Going Solo that only three young Englishmen ran the Shell company in the territory, of which he was the youngest and junior. Along with the only two other Shell employees in the entire territory, he lived in luxury in the Shell House outside Dar es Salaam, with a cook and personal servants. While out on assignments supplying oil to customers across Tanganyika, he encountered black mamba snakes and lions, among other wildlife.

== Fighter pilot ==
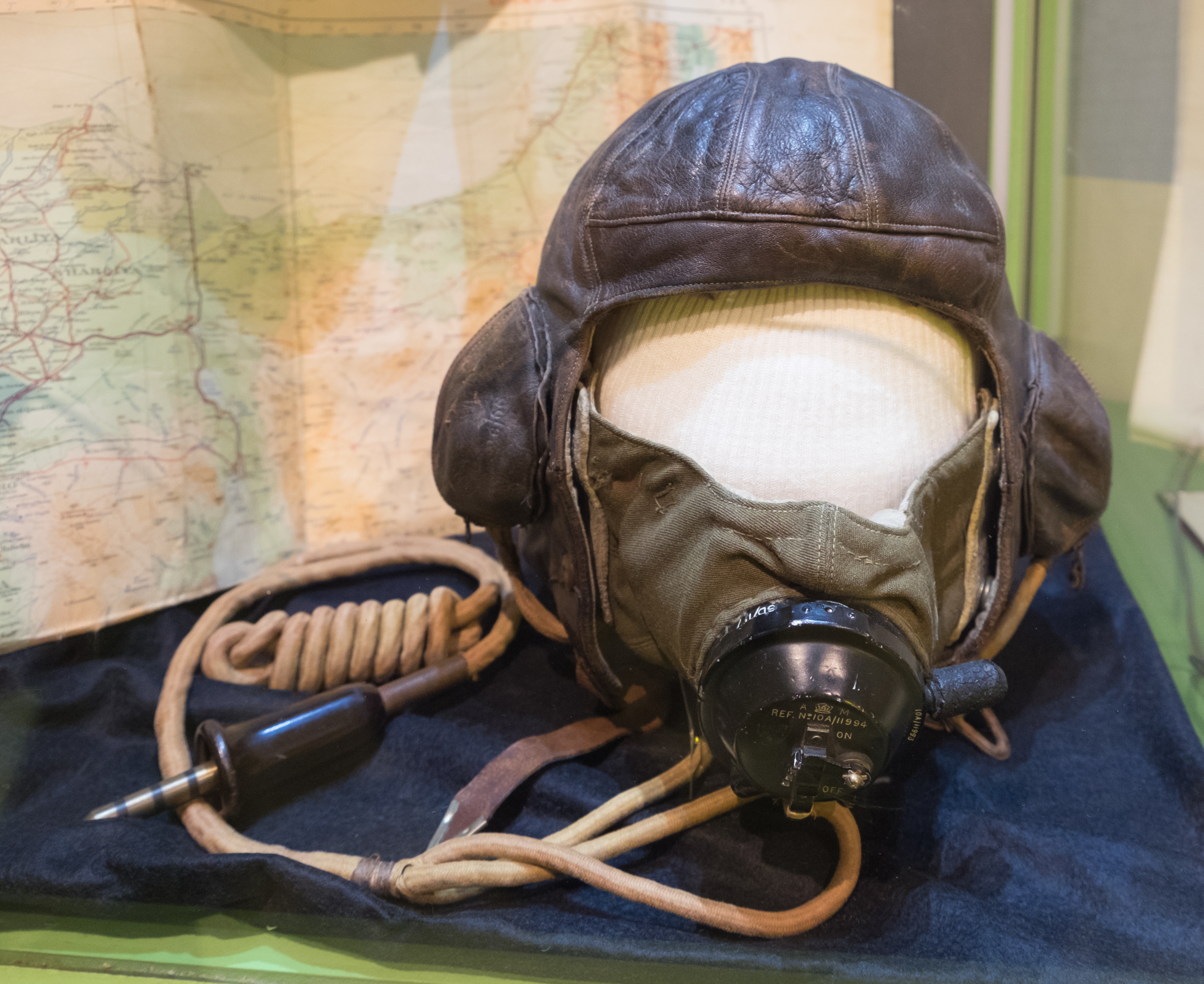
Dahl's leather flying helmet on display in the Roald Dahl Museum and Story Centre in Great Missenden

In August 1939, as the Second World War loomed, the British made plans to round up the hundreds of Germans living in Dar-es-Salaam. Dahl was commissioned as a lieutenant into the King's African Rifles, commanding a platoon of Askari men, indigenous troops who were serving in the colonial army.

In November 1939, Dahl joined the Royal Air Force (RAF) as an aircraftman with service number 774022. After a 600-mile (970 km) car journey from Dar es Salaam to Nairobi, he was accepted for flight training with sixteen other men, of whom only three survived the war. With seven hours and 40 minutes experience in a De Havilland Tiger Moth, he flew solo; Dahl enjoyed watching the wildlife of Kenya during his flights. He continued to advanced flying training in Iraq, at RAF Habbaniya, 50 miles (80 km) west of Baghdad. Following six months' training on Hawker Harts, Dahl was commissioned as a pilot officer on 24 August 1940, and was judged ready to join a squadron and face the enemy.

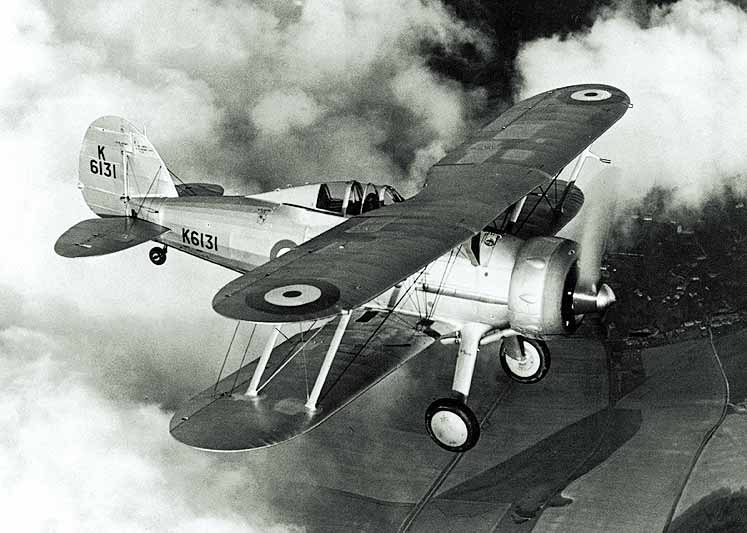
Dahl was flying a Gloster Gladiator when he crash-landed in the Libyan desert.

He was assigned to No. 80 Squadron RAF, flying obsolete Gloster Gladiators, the last biplane fighter aircraft used by the RAF. Dahl was surprised to find that he would not receive any specialised training in aerial combat or in flying Gladiators. On 19 September 1940, Dahl and another pilot were ordered to fly their Gladiators by stages from Abu Sueir (near Ismailia, in Egypt) to 80 Squadron's forward airstrip 30 miles (48 km) south of Mersa Matruh. On the final leg, they could not find the airstrip and, running low on fuel and with night approaching, Dahl was forced to attempt a landing in the desert. The undercarriage hit a boulder and the aircraft crashed. Dahl's skull was fractured and his nose was smashed; he was temporarily blinded. He managed to drag himself away from the wreckage and lost consciousness. His colleague, Douglas McDonald, had landed safely and was able to comfort Dahl until they were rescued. He wrote about the crash in his first published work. Dahl came to believe that the head injury he sustained in the crash resulted in his creative genius.

Dahl was rescued and taken to a first-aid post in Mersa Matruh, where he regained consciousness, but not his sight. He remained blind for six weeks due to massive swelling of the brain. He was transported by train to the Royal Navy hospital in Alexandria. There he fell in and out of love with a nurse, Mary Welland. As he wrote in his memoir Going Solo, "Mary Welland was certainly lovely. She was gentle and kind. She remained my friend all the time I was in hospital. But there is a world of difference falling in love with a voice and remaining in love with a person you can see. From the moment I opened my eyes, Mary became a human instead of a dream and my passion evaporated." An RAF inquiry into the crash revealed that the location to which he had been told to fly was completely wrong, and he had mistakenly been sent instead into the no man's land between the Allied and Italian forces.

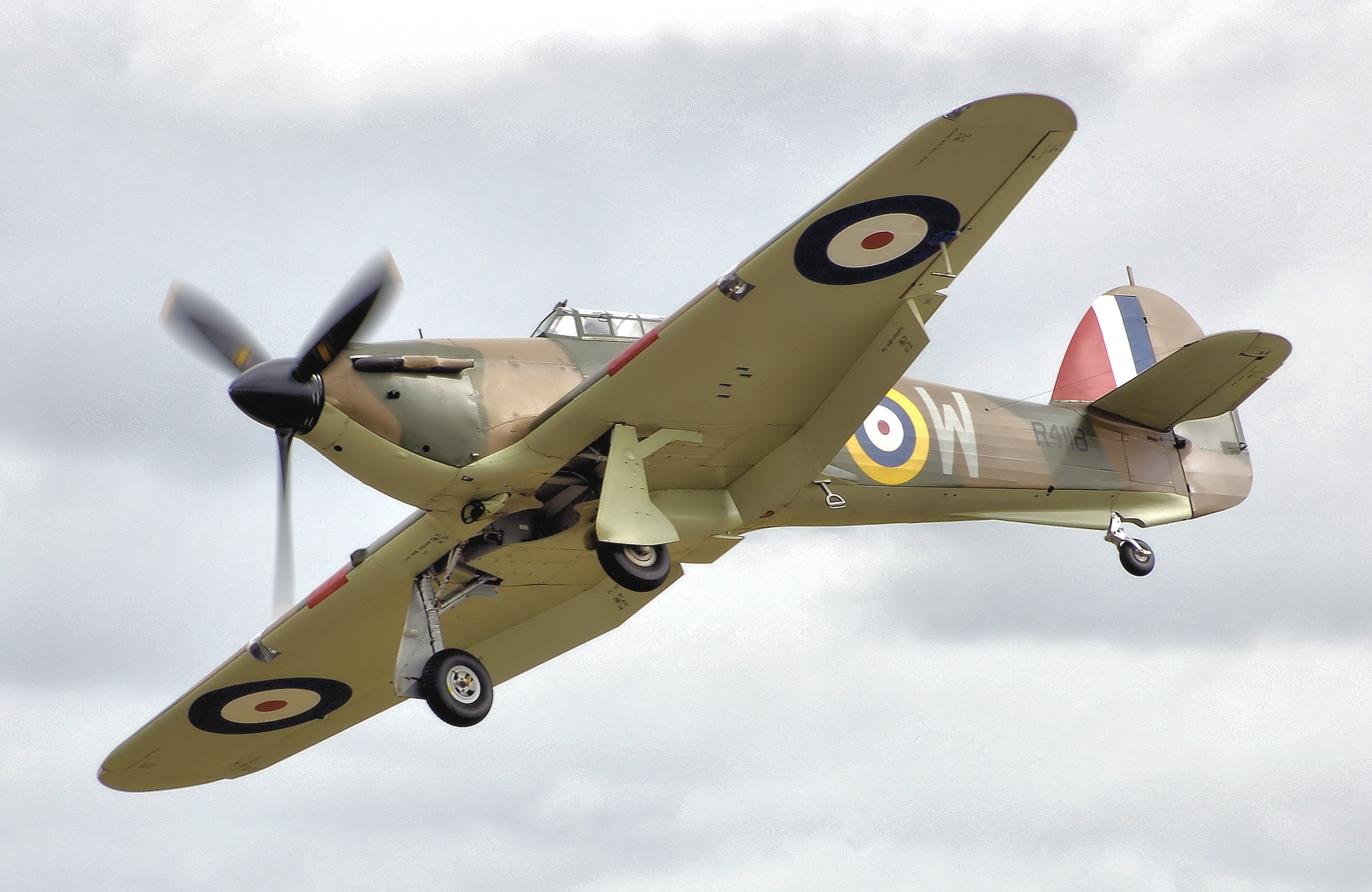
A Hawker Hurricane Mk 1, the aircraft type in which Dahl engaged in aerial combat over Greece

In February 1941, Dahl was discharged from the hospital and deemed fully fit for flying duties. By this time, 80 Squadron had been transferred to the Greek campaign and based at Eleusina, near Athens. The squadron was now equipped with Hawker Hurricanes. Dahl flew a replacement Hurricane across the Mediterranean Sea in April 1941, after seven hours' experience flying Hurricanes. By this stage in the Greek campaign, the RAF had only 18 combat aircraft in Greece: 14 Hurricanes and four Bristol Blenheim light bombers. Dahl flew in his first aerial combat on 15 April 1941, while flying alone over the city of Chalcis. He attacked six Junkers Ju 88s that were bombing ships and shot one down. The next day, he shot down another Ju 88.

On 20 April 1941, Dahl took part in an event he called the Battle of Athens, alongside the highest-scoring British Commonwealth ace of World War II, Pat Pattle, and Dahl's friend David Coke. Of 12 Hurricanes involved, five were shot down and four of their pilots killed, including Pattle. Greek observers on the ground counted 22 German aircraft downed, but because of the confusion of the aerial engagement, none of the pilots knew which aircraft they had shot down. Dahl described it as "an endless blur of enemy fighters whizzing towards me from every side".

In May, as the Germans were pressing on Athens, Dahl was evacuated to Egypt. His squadron was reassembled in Haifa to take part in Operation Exporter. From there, Dahl flew sorties every day for a period of four weeks, shooting down a Vichy French Air Force Potez 63 on 8 June and another Ju 88 on 15 June. In a memoir, Dahl recounts in detail an attack by him and his fellow Hurricane pilots on the Vichy-held Rayak airfield. He says that as he and his fellow Hurricane pilots swept in:

... low over the field at midday we saw to our astonishment a bunch of girls in brightly coloured cotton dresses standing out by the planes with glasses in their hands having drinks with the French pilots, and I remember seeing bottles of wine standing on the wing of one of the planes as we went swooshing over. It was a Sunday morning and the Frenchmen were evidently entertaining their girlfriends and showing off their aircraft to them, which was a very French thing to do in the middle of a war at a front-line aerodrome. Every one of us held our fire on that first pass over the flying field and it was wonderfully comical to see the girls all dropping their wine glasses and galloping in their high heels for the door of the nearest building. We went round again, but this time we were no longer a surprise and they were ready for us with their ground defences, and I am afraid that our chivalry resulted in damage to several of our Hurricanes, including my own. But we destroyed five of their planes on the ground.

Despite this somewhat light-hearted account, Dahl also noted that, ultimately, Vichy forces killed four of the nine Hurricane pilots in his squadron. Describing the Vichy forces as "disgusting", he stated that "... thousands of lives were lost, and I for one have never forgiven the Vichy French for the unnecessary slaughter they caused."

When he began to get severe headaches that caused him to black out, he was invalided home to Britain where he stayed with his mother in Buckinghamshire. Although at this time Dahl was only a pilot officer on probation, in September 1941 he was simultaneously confirmed as a pilot officer and promoted to war substantive flying officer.

== Diplomat, writer and intelligence officer ==
After being invalided home, Dahl was posted to an RAF training camp in Uxbridge. He attempted to recover his health enough to become an instructor. In late March 1942, while in London, he met the Under-Secretary of State for Air, Major Harold Balfour, at his club. Impressed by Dahl's war record and conversational abilities, Balfour appointed the young man as assistant air attaché at the British Embassy in Washington, D.C. Initially resistant, Dahl was finally persuaded by Balfour to accept, and took passage on the MS Batory from Glasgow a few days later. He arrived in Halifax, Canada, on 14 April, after which he took a sleeper train to Montreal.

Coming from war-starved Britain (in what was a wartime period of rationing in the United Kingdom), Dahl was amazed by the wealth of food and amenities to be had in North America. Arriving in Washington a week later, Dahl found he liked the atmosphere of the US capital. He shared a house with another attaché at 1610 34th Street, NW, in Georgetown. But after ten days in his new posting, Dahl strongly disliked it, feeling he had taken on "a most ungodly unimportant job". He later explained, "I'd just come from the war. People were getting killed. I had been flying around, seeing horrible things. Now, almost instantly, I found myself in the middle of a pre-war cocktail party in America."

Dahl was unimpressed by his office in the British Air Mission, attached to the embassy. He was also unimpressed by the ambassador, Lord Halifax, with whom he sometimes played tennis and whom he described as "a courtly English gentleman," but whose ideas Dahl found outdated and overcautious. Dahl socialised with Charles E. Marsh, a Texas publisher and oilman, at his house at 2136 R Street, NW, and the Marsh country estate in Virginia. As part of his duties as assistant air attaché, Dahl was to help neutralise the isolationist views still held by many Americans by giving pro-British speeches and discussing his war service; the United States had entered the war only the previous December, following the attack on Pearl Harbor.

At this time Dahl met the noted British novelist C. S. Forester, who was also working to aid the British war effort. Forester worked for the British Ministry of Information and was writing propaganda for the Allied cause, mainly for American consumption. The Saturday Evening Post had asked Forester to write a story based on Dahl's flying experiences; Forester asked Dahl to write down some RAF anecdotes so that he could shape them into a story. After Forester read what Dahl had given him, he decided to publish the story exactly as Dahl had written it. In reality a number of changes were made to the original manuscript before publication. He originally titled the article "A Piece of Cake" but the magazine changed it to "Shot Down Over Libya" to make it sound more dramatic, although Dahl had not been shot down; it was published on 1 August 1942 issue of the Post. Dahl was promoted to flight lieutenant (war-substantive) in August 1942. Later he worked with such other well-known British officers as Ian Fleming (who later published the popular James Bond series) and David Ogilvy, promoting Britain's interests and message in the US and combating the "America First" movement.

This work introduced Dahl to espionage and the activities of the Canadian spymaster William Stephenson, known by the codename "Intrepid". During the war, Dahl supplied intelligence from Washington to Prime Minister Winston Churchill. As Dahl later said: "My job was to try to help Winston to get on with FDR, and tell Winston what was in the old boy's mind." Dahl also supplied intelligence to Stephenson and his organisation, known as British Security Coordination, which was part of MI6. Dahl was once sent back to Britain by British Embassy officials, supposedly for misconduct—"I got booted out by the big boys", he said. Stephenson promptly sent him back to Washington—with a promotion to wing commander rank. Toward the end of the war, Dahl wrote some of the history of the secret organisation. He and Stephenson remained friends for decades after the war.

Upon the war's conclusion, Dahl held the rank of a temporary wing commander (substantive flight lieutenant). Owing to the severity of his injuries from the 1940 accident, he was pronounced unfit for further service and was invalided out of the RAF in August 1946. He left the service with the substantive rank of squadron leader. His record of five aerial victories, qualifying him as a flying ace, has been confirmed by post-war research and cross-referenced in Axis records. It is possible that he shot down more aircraft, for example on 20 April 1941 when the Germans lost several aircraft.

== Post-war life ==
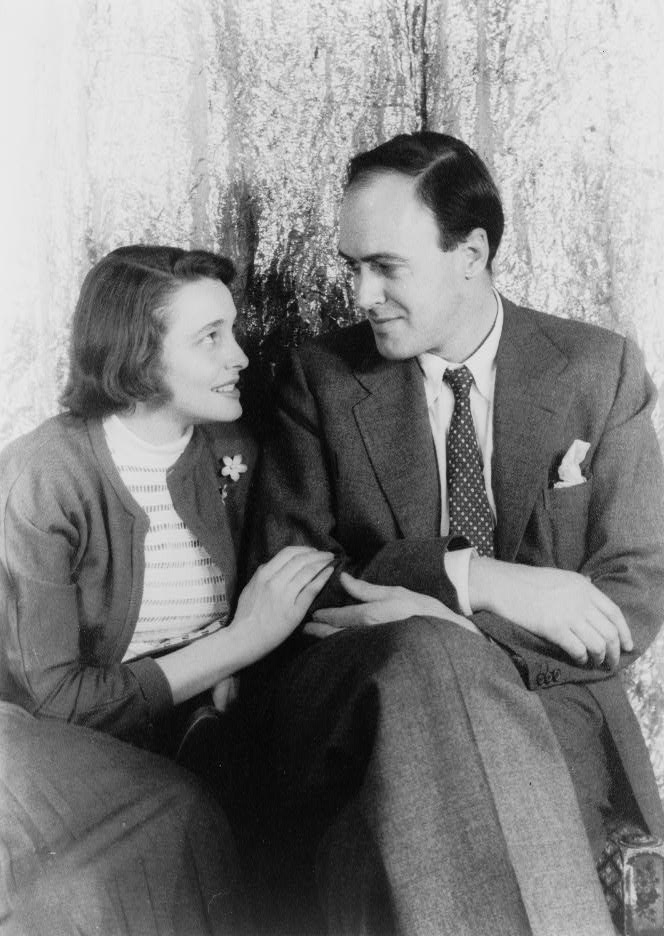
Patricia Neal and Roald Dahl in April 1954

Dahl married American actress Patricia Neal on 2 July 1953 at Trinity Church in New York City. Their marriage lasted 30 years and they had five children:

- Olivia Twenty (1955–1962)
- Chantal Sophia "Tessa" (born 1957), who became an author, and mother of author, cookbook writer and former model Sophie Dahl (after whom Sophie in The BFG is named)
- Theo Matthew (born 1960)
- Ophelia Magdalena (born 1964)
- Lucy Neal (born 1965)

On 5 December 1960, four-month-old Theo was severely injured when his baby carriage was struck by a taxicab in New York City. For a time, he suffered from hydrocephalus. As a result, Dahl became involved in the development of what became known as the "Wade-Dahl-Till" (or WDT) valve, a device to improve the shunt used to alleviate the condition. The valve was a collaboration between Dahl, hydraulic engineer Stanley Wade, and London's Great Ormond Street Hospital neurosurgeon Kenneth Till, and was used successfully on almost 3,000 children around the world.

In November 1962, Olivia died of measles encephalitis, age seven. Her death left Dahl "limp with despair", and feeling guilty about not having been able to do anything for her. Dahl subsequently became a proponent of immunisation—writing "Measles: A Dangerous Illness" in 1988 in response to measles cases in the UK—and dedicated his 1982 book The BFG to her. After Olivia's death and a meeting with a Church official, Dahl came to view Christianity as a sham. In mourning he had sought spiritual guidance from Geoffrey Fisher, the former Archbishop of Canterbury, and was dismayed being told that, although Olivia was in Paradise, her beloved dog Rowley would never join her there. Dahl recalled years later:

I wanted to ask him how he could be so absolutely sure that other creatures did not get the same special treatment as us. I sat there wondering if this great and famous churchman really knew what he was talking about and whether he knew anything at all about God or heaven, and if he didn't, then who in the world did?

In 1965, Patricia Neal suffered three burst cerebral aneurysms while pregnant with their fifth child, Lucy. Dahl took control of her rehabilitation over the next months; Neal had to re-learn to talk and walk. She subsequently managed to return to her acting career. This period of their lives was dramatized in the film The Patricia Neal Story (1981), in which the couple were played by Glenda Jackson and Dirk Bogarde.

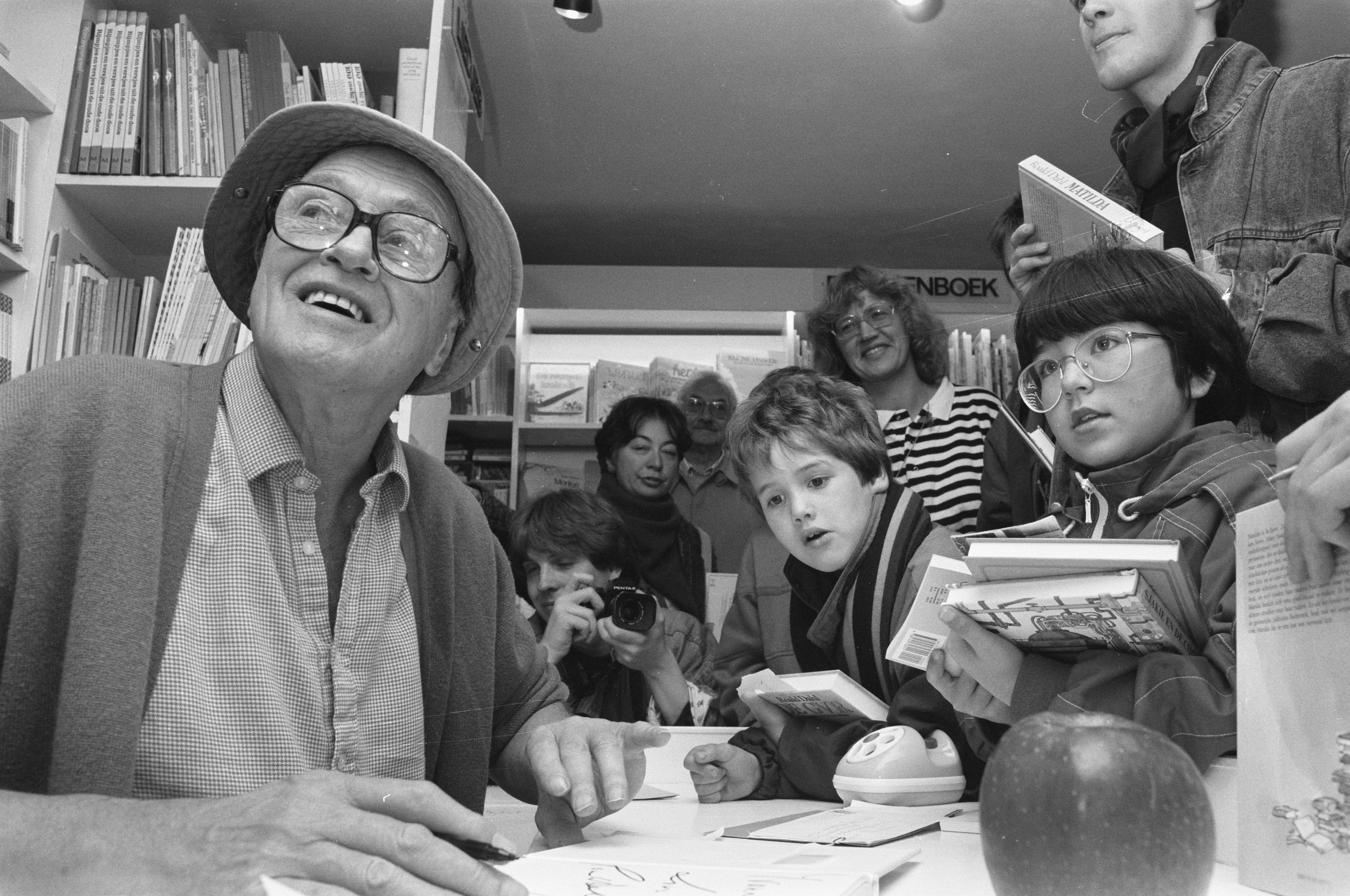
Dahl (age 72) signing books in Amsterdam, Netherlands in October 1988

In 1972, Roald Dahl met Felicity "Liccy" d'Abreu Crosland (niece of Lt.-Col. Francis D'Abreu, who was married to Margaret Bowes Lyon, the first cousin of the Queen Mother), while Felicity was working as a set designer on an advert for Maxim coffee with Dahl's then wife, Patricia Neal. Soon after the pair were introduced, they began an 11-year affair. In 1983 Neal and Dahl divorced and Dahl married Felicity, at Brixton Town Hall, South London. Felicity gave up her job and moved into Gipsy House, Great Missenden, Buckinghamshire, which had been Dahl's home since 1954.

Dahl made several antisemitic comments during his lifetime, and stated late in life that he was antisemitic. In August 1983, Dahl reviewed Australian author Tony Clifton's God Cried, a picture book about the siege of West Beirut by the Israeli army during the 1982 Lebanon War. The article, in which Dahl stated the Jews had never "switched so rapidly from much-pitied victims to barbarous murderers", appeared in the Literary Review and was the subject of media comment and criticism at the time. Dahl wrote that Clifton's book would make readers "violently anti-Israeli", at the time saying, "I am not anti-Semitic. I am anti-Israel." In 1990, Dahl spoke again on the Lebanon invasion, stating "they killed 22,000 civilians when they bombed Beirut. It was very much hushed up in the newspapers because they are primarily Jewish-owned. I'm certainly anti-Israeli and I've become antisemitic in as much as that you get a Jewish person in another country like England strongly supporting Zionism. I think they should see both sides. It's the same old thing: we all know about Jews and the rest of it. There aren't any non-Jewish publishers anywhere, they control the media—jolly clever thing to do". His comments invoked responses from Jewish colleagues and friends, with philosopher Sir Isaiah Berlin stating, "I thought he might say anything. Could have been pro-Arab or pro-Jew. There was no consistent line. He was a man who followed whims, which meant he would blow up in one direction, so to speak", while Amelia Foster, Jewish director of the Roald Dahl Museum in Great Missenden, said, "He had a childish reaction to what was going on in Israel. Dahl wanted to provoke, as he always provoked at dinner." In 2014, due to his comments, the Royal Mint decided not to produce a coin to commemorate Dahl's 100th birthday. In 2020, Dahl's family published, on the official Roald Dahl website, an apology for his antisemitism.

In the 1986 New Years Honours List, Dahl was offered an appointment to Order of the British Empire (OBE), but turned it down. He reportedly wanted a knighthood so that his wife would be Lady Dahl. Dahl's last significant involvement in medical charity was with dyslexia. In 1990, when the United Nations launched International Literacy Year, Dahl helped with the British Dyslexia Association's Awareness Campaign. That year Dahl wrote one of his last children's books, The Vicar of Nibbleswicke, about a vicar who has a fictitious form of dyslexia that causes him to say words backwards. Called "a comic tale in the best Dahl tradition of craziness" by Waterstones, Dahl donated the rights of the book to the Dyslexia Institute in London.

== Writing ==
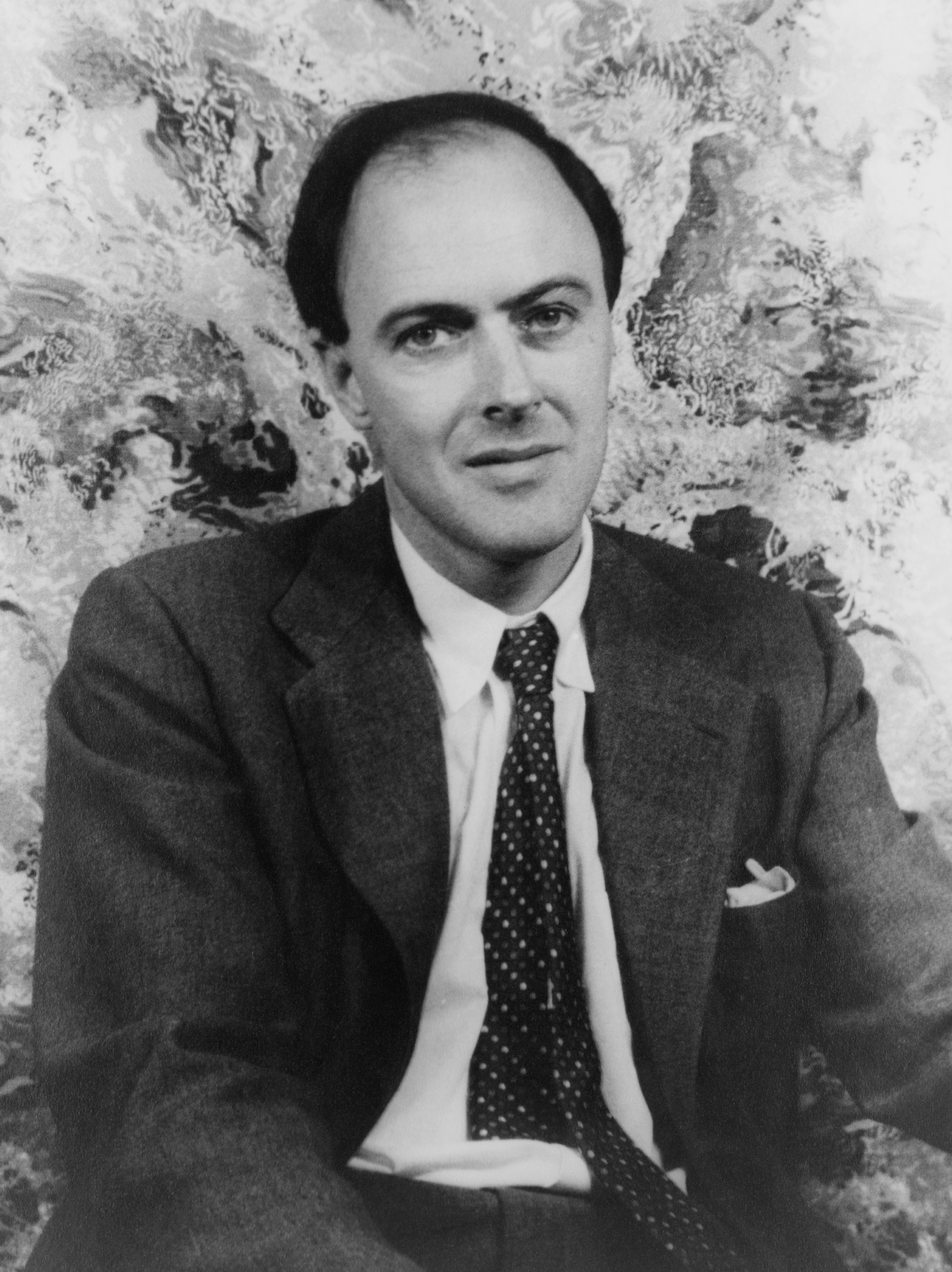
Dahl in 1954, by which point he had written his first children's book The Gremlins, which was inspired by his wartime experience in the Royal Air Force, and several adult short stories.

Dahl's first published work, inspired by a meeting with C. S. Forester, was "A Piece of Cake", on 1 August 1942. The story, about his wartime adventures, was bought by The Saturday Evening Post for US$1,000 (equivalent to $20,000 in 2025) and published under the title "Shot Down Over Libya".

His first children's book was The Gremlins, published in 1943, about mischievous little creatures that were part of Royal Air Force folklore. The RAF pilots blamed the gremlins for all the problems with the aircraft. The protagonist Gus—an RAF pilot, like Dahl—joins forces with the gremlins against a common enemy, Hitler and the Nazis. While at the British Embassy in Washington, Dahl sent a copy to the First Lady Eleanor Roosevelt who read it to her grandchildren, and the book was commissioned by Walt Disney for a film that was never made. Dahl went on to write some of the best-loved children's stories of the 20th century, such as Charlie and the Chocolate Factory, Matilda, James and the Giant Peach, The Witches, Fantastic Mr Fox, The BFG, The Twits and George's Marvellous Medicine.

Dahl also had a successful parallel career as the writer of macabre adult short stories, which often blended humour and innocence with surprising plot twists. The Mystery Writers of America presented Dahl with three Edgar Awards for his work, and many were originally written for American magazines such as Collier's ("The Collector's Item" was Collier's Star Story of the week for 4 September 1948), Ladies' Home Journal, Harper's, Playboy and The New Yorker. Works such as Kiss Kiss subsequently collected Dahl's stories into anthologies, and gained significant popularity. Dahl wrote more than 60 short stories; they have appeared in numerous collections, some only being published in book form after his death. His three Edgar Awards were given for: in 1954, the collection Someone Like You; in 1959, the story "The Landlady"; and in 1980, the episode of Tales of the Unexpected based on "Skin".

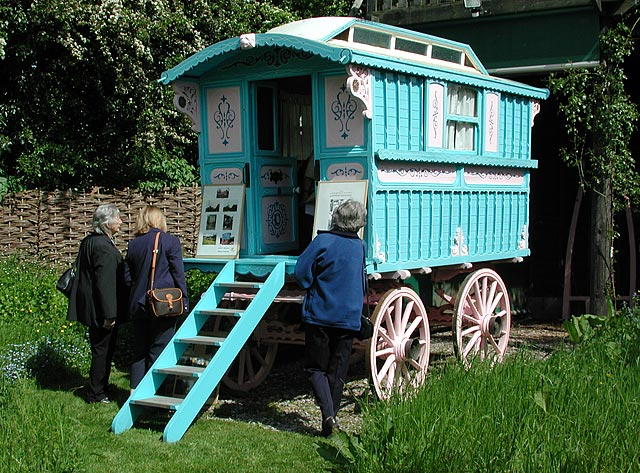
Roald Dahl's vardo in the garden of his home, Gipsy House, in Great Missenden, Buckinghamshire, where he wrote Danny, the Champion of the World in 1975

One of his more famous adult stories, "The Smoker", also known as "Man from the South", was filmed twice as both 1960 and 1985 episodes of Alfred Hitchcock Presents, filmed as a 1979 episode of Tales of the Unexpected, and also adapted into Quentin Tarantino's segment of the film Four Rooms (1995). This oft-anthologised classic concerns a man in Jamaica who wagers with visitors in an attempt to claim the fingers from their hands. The original 1960 version in the Hitchcock series stars Steve McQueen and Peter Lorre. Five additional Dahl stories were used in the Hitchcock series. Dahl was credited with teleplay for two episodes, and four of his episodes were directed by Alfred Hitchcock himself, an example of which was "Lamb to the Slaughter" (1958).

Dahl acquired a traditional Romanichal vardo in the 1960s, and the family used it as a playhouse for his children at home in Great Missenden, Buckinghamshire. He later used the vardo as a writing room, where he wrote Danny, the Champion of the World in 1975. Dahl incorporated a similar caravan into the main plot of the book, in which the young English boy, Danny, and his father, William (played by Jeremy Irons in the film adaptation), live in a vardo. Many other scenes and characters from Great Missenden are reflected in his work. For example, the village library was the inspiration for Mrs Phelps' library in Matilda, where the title character Matilda devours classic literature by the age of four.

His short story collection Tales of the Unexpected was adapted to a successful TV series of the same name, beginning with "Man from the South". When the stock of Dahl's own original stories was exhausted, the series continued by adapting stories written in Dahl's style by other authors, including John Collier and Stanley Ellin. Another collection of short stories, The Wonderful Story of Henry Sugar and Six More, was published in 1977, and the eponymous short story was adapted into a short film in 2023 by director Wes Anderson with Benedict Cumberbatch as the titular character Henry Sugar and Ralph Fiennes as Dahl.

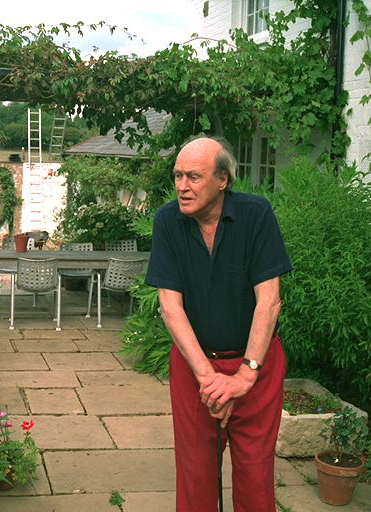
Dahl at Gipsy House in September 1990; Memories with Food at Gipsy House was published posthumously.

Some of Dahl's short stories are supposed to be extracts from the diary of his (fictional) Uncle Oswald, a rich gentleman whose sexual exploits form the subject of these stories. In his novel My Uncle Oswald, the uncle engages a temptress to seduce 20th century geniuses and royalty with a love potion secretly added to chocolate truffles made by Dahl's favourite chocolate shop, Prestat of Piccadilly, London. Memories with Food at Gipsy House, written with his wife Felicity and published posthumously in 1991, was a mixture of recipes, family reminiscences and Dahl's musings on favourite subjects such as chocolate, onions and claret.

The last book published in his lifetime, Esio Trot, released in January 1990, marked a change in style for the author. Unlike other Dahl works (which often feature tyrannical adults and heroic/magical children), it is the story of an old, lonely man trying to make a connection with a woman he has loved from afar. In 1994, the English language audiobook recording of the book was provided by Monty Python member Michael Palin. Screenwriter Richard Curtis adapted it into a 2015 BBC television comedy film, Roald Dahl's Esio Trot, featuring Dustin Hoffman and Judi Dench as the couple.

Written in 1990 and published posthumously in 1991, Roald Dahl's Guide to Railway Safety was one of the last things he ever wrote. In a response to rising levels of train-related fatalities involving children, the British Railways Board had asked Dahl to write the text of the booklet, and Quentin Blake to illustrate it, to help young people enjoy using the railways safely. The booklet is structured as a conversation with children, and it was distributed to primary school pupils in Britain. According to children's literature critic Deborah Cogan Thacker, Dahl's tendency in his children's books is to "put child characters in powerful positions" and so, the idea of "talking down" to children was always an anathema to him, therefore Dahl, in the introduction of the booklet, states; "I must now regretfully become one of those unpopular giants who tells you WHAT TO DO and WHAT NOT TO DO. This is something I have never done in any of my books."

=== Children's fiction ===
"He [Dahl] was mischievous. A grown-up being mischievous. He addresses you, a child, as somebody who knows about the world. He was a grown-up—and he was bigger than most—who is on your side. That must have something to do with it."

— Illustrator and Dahl collaborator Quentin Blake on the lasting appeal of Dahl's children's books.

Dahl's children's works are usually told from the point of view of a child. They typically involve adult villains who hate and mistreat children, and feature at least one "good" adult to counteract the villain(s). These stock characters are possibly a reference to the abuse that Dahl stated that he experienced in the boarding schools he attended. In a biography of Dahl, Matthew Dennison wrote that "his writing frequently included protests against unfairness". Dahl's books see the triumph of the child; children's book critic Amanda Craig said, "He was unequivocal that it is the good, young and kind who triumph over the old, greedy and the wicked." Anna Leskiewicz in The Telegraph wrote, "It's often suggested that Dahl's lasting appeal is a result of his exceptional talent for wriggling his way into children's fantasies and fears, and laying them out on the page with anarchic delight. Adult villains are drawn in terrifying detail, before they are exposed as liars and hypocrites, and brought tumbling down with retributive justice, either by a sudden magic or the superior acuity of the children they mistreat."

While his whimsical fantasy stories feature an underlying warm sentiment, they are often juxtaposed with grotesque, darkly comic and sometimes harshly violent scenarios. The Witches, George's Marvellous Medicine and Matilda are examples of this formula. The BFG follows, with the good giant (the BFG or "Big Friendly Giant") representing the "good adult" archetype and the other giants being the "bad adults". This formula is also somewhat evident in Dahl's film script for Chitty Chitty Bang Bang. Class-conscious themes also surface in works such as Fantastic Mr Fox and Danny, the Champion of the World where the unpleasant wealthy neighbours are outwitted.

Dahl also features characters who are very fat, usually children. Augustus Gloop, Bruce Bogtrotter and Bruno Jenkins are a few of these characters, although an enormous woman named Aunt Sponge features in James and the Giant Peach and the nasty farmer Boggis in Fantastic Mr Fox is an enormously fat character. All of these characters (with the possible exception of Bruce Bogtrotter) are either villains or simply unpleasant gluttons. They are usually punished for this: Augustus Gloop drinks from Willy Wonka's chocolate river, disregarding the adults who tell him not to, and falls in, getting sucked up a pipe and nearly being turned into fudge. In Matilda, Bruce Bogtrotter steals cake from the evil headmistress, Miss Trunchbull, and is forced to eat a gigantic chocolate cake in front of the school; when he unexpectedly succeeds at this, Trunchbull smashes the empty plate over his head. In The Witches, Bruno Jenkins is lured by the witches (whose leader is the Grand High Witch) into their convention with the promise of chocolate, before they turn him into a mouse. Aunt Sponge is flattened by a giant peach. When Dahl was a boy his mother used to tell him and his sisters tales about trolls and other mythical Norwegian creatures, and some of his children's books contain references or elements inspired by these stories, such as the giants in The BFG, the fox family in Fantastic Mr Fox and the trolls in The Minpins.

In 1972, Eleanor Cameron, also a children's book author, published an article in The Horn Book criticising Charlie and the Chocolate Factory and its depiction of the African-derived Oompa-Loompas, who "have never been given the opportunity of any life outside of the chocolate factory". In 1973, Dahl posted a reply, calling Cameron's accusations "insensitive" and "monstrous". The debate between the two authors sparked much discussion and a number of letters to the editor. In 1991, Michael Dirda also discussed other criticisms of Dahl's writing, including his alleged sexism, of which Dirda wrote, "The Witches verges on a general misogyny." In 1998, Michele Landsberg analysed the alleged issues in Dahl's work and concluded that, "Throughout his work, evil, domineering, smelly, fat, ugly women are his favourite villains." In 2008, Una Mullally argued that there are feminist messages in Dahl's work, even if they may be obscured, "The Witches offers up plenty of feminist complexities. The witches themselves are terrifying and vile things, and always women... The book is often viewed as sexist, but that assessment ignores one of the heroines of the story, the child narrator's grandmother."

Receiving the 1983 World Fantasy Award for Life Achievement, Dahl encouraged his children and his readers to let their imagination run free. His daughter Lucy stated "his spirit was so large and so big he taught us to believe in magic." She said her father later told her that if they had simply said goodnight after a bedtime story, he assumed it wasn't a good idea. But if they begged him to continue, he knew he was on to something, and the story would sometimes turn into a book.

Those who don't believe in magic will never find it.

— Roald Dahl, The Minpins.

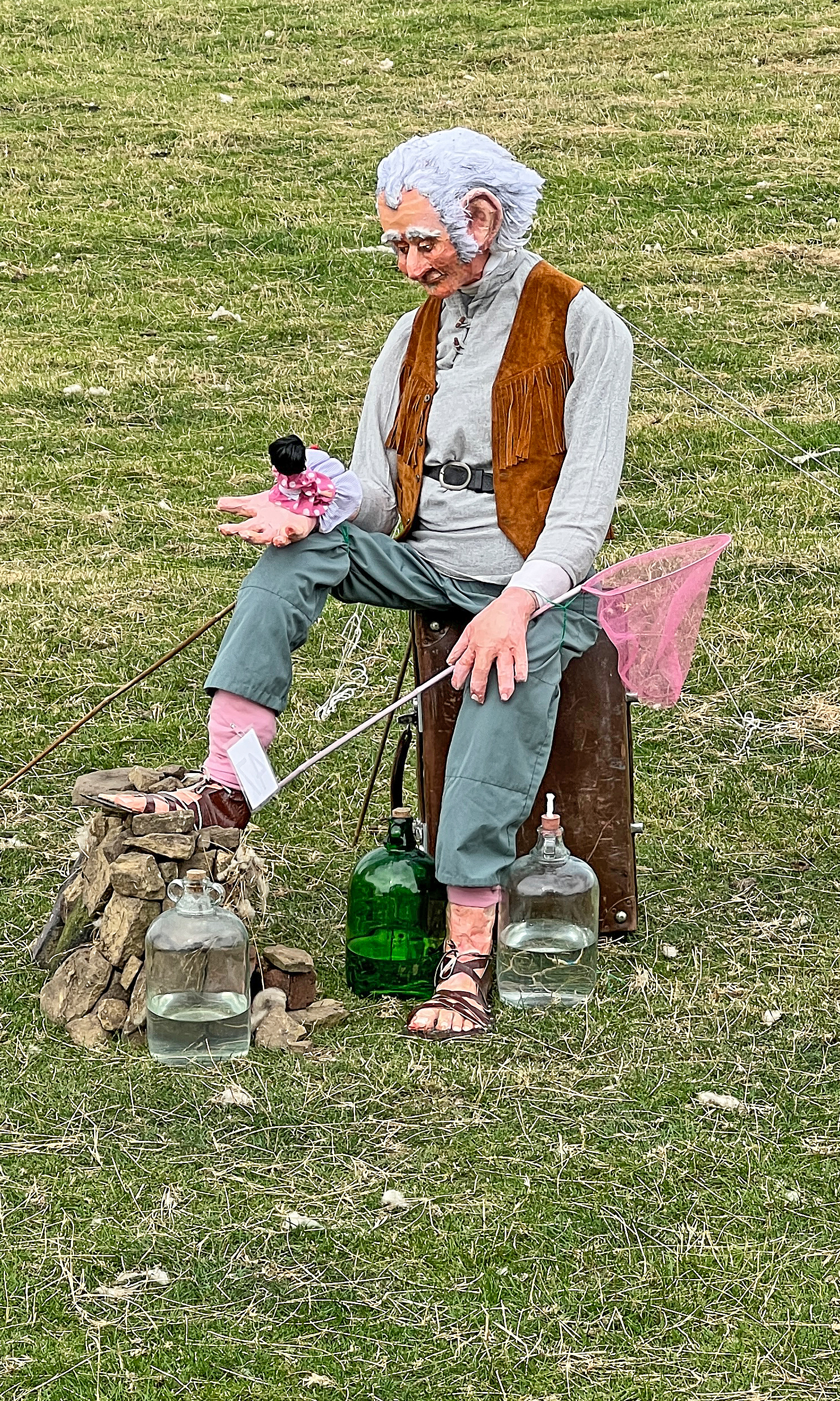
Scarecrow of the BFG (the Big Friendly Giant) at a festival in Yorkshire; many of Dahl's new words are spoken by the character.

Dahl was also famous for his inventive, playful use of language, which was a key element to his writing. He invented over 500 new words by scribbling down his words before swapping letters around and adopting spoonerisms and malapropisms. The lexicographer Susan Rennie stated that Dahl built his new words on familiar sounds, adding:

He didn't always explain what his words meant, but children can work them out because they often sound like a word they know, and he loved using onomatopoeia. For example, you know that something lickswishy and delumptious is good to eat, whereas something uckyslush or rotsome is definitely not! He also used sounds that children love to say, like squishous and squizzle, or fizzlecrump and fizzwiggler.

As marketing director of Penguin Books in the 1980s, Barry Cunningham travelled the UK with Dahl on a promotional book tour, during which he asked Dahl what the secret of his success was; Dahl responded by saying that "the thing you've got to remember, is that humour is delayed fear, laughter is delayed fear." Cunningham later recollected, "if you look at the way he uses humour and the way that children use humour, perhaps sometimes it's the only weapon they have against terrifying circumstances or people. That's very indicative of his stories and the style of those stories."

A UK television special titled Roald Dahl's Revolting Rule Book, which was hosted by Richard E. Grant and aired on ITV on 22 September 2007, commemorated Dahl's 90th birthday and also celebrated his impact as a children's author in popular culture. It also featured eight main rules he applied on all his children's books, among them: Just add chocolate, Adults can be scary, Bad things happen, and Keep a wicked sense of humour.

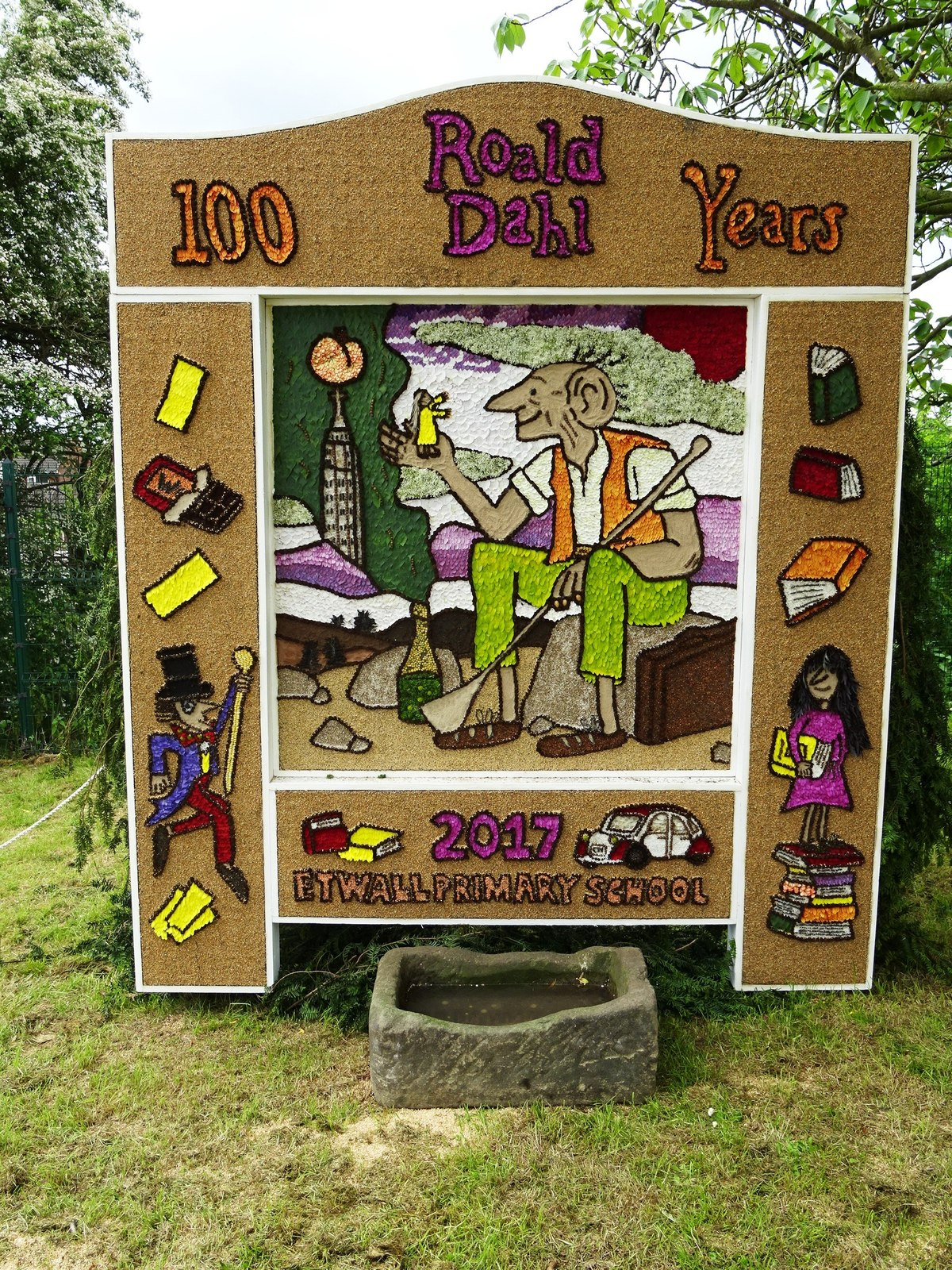
Well dressing in Etwall, Derbyshire, depicting various characters from Dahl's children's stories, marking the centenary of his birth

In 2016, marking the centenary of Dahl's birth, Rennie compiled The Oxford Roald Dahl Dictionary which includes many of his invented words and their meaning. Rennie commented that some of Dahl's words have already escaped his world, for example, Scrumdiddlyumptious: "Food that is utterly delicious". In his poetry, Dahl gives a humorous re-interpretation of well-known nursery rhymes and fairy tales, parodying the narratives and providing surprise endings in place of the traditional happily-ever-after. Dahl's collection of poems, Revolting Rhymes, is recorded in audiobook form, and narrated by actor Alan Cumming.

In 2023, Puffin Books, which holds the rights to all Dahl's children's books, published editions which included hundreds of revisions to the text at the advice of sensitivity readers. Changes included the use of gender-neutral words and phrases such as "parents" or "siblings" rather than "boys and girls", "mothers and fathers", the word "fat" being replaced with terms such as "enormous" or "large", and words like "crazy" and "mad" were regularly removed. The move was supported by a number of authors, including Society of Authors chair Joanne Harris and Diego Jourdan Pereira at Writer's Digest, but it drew many more critical responses. Several public figures, including then-Prime Minister Rishi Sunak and author Salman Rushdie, spoke out against the changes. It was reported that when Dahl was alive, he had spoken out very strongly against any changes ever being made to any of his books. On 23 February 2023, Puffin announced it would release an unedited selection of Dahl's children's books as 'The Roald Dahl Classic Collection', stating, "We've listened to the debate over the past week which has reaffirmed the extraordinary power of Roald Dahl's books" and "recognise the importance of keeping Dahl's classic texts in print".

=== Screenplays ===
For a brief period in the 1960s, Dahl wrote screenplays. Two, the James Bond film You Only Live Twice and Chitty Chitty Bang Bang, were adaptations of novels by Ian Fleming. Dahl also began adapting his own novel Charlie and the Chocolate Factory, which was completed and rewritten by David Seltzer after Dahl failed to meet deadlines, and produced as the film Willy Wonka & the Chocolate Factory (1971). Dahl later disowned the film, saying he was "disappointed" because "he thought it placed too much emphasis on Willy Wonka and not enough on Charlie". He was also "infuriated" by the deviations in the plot devised by David Seltzer in his draft of the screenplay. This resulted in his refusal for any more versions of the book to be made in his lifetime. He wrote the script for a film that began filming but was abandoned, Death, Where is Thy Sting-a-ling-ling?.

=== Television ===
"Roald Dahl's Tales of the Unexpected is remembered not only for its “twist in the tale” endings, but also its eerie fairground waltz theme tune, and Dahl, sat at a crackling fireside, introducing that week's strange yarn."

— The Telegraph's Tom Fordy on the television adaptation of Tales of the Unexpected.

In 1961, Dahl hosted and wrote for a science fiction and horror television anthology series called 'Way Out, which preceded the Twilight Zone series on the CBS network for 14 episodes from March to July. One of the last dramatic network shows shot in New York City, the entire series is available for viewing at The Paley Center for Media. He also wrote for the satirical BBC comedy programme That Was the Week That Was, which was hosted by David Frost.

The British television series, Tales of the Unexpected, originally aired on ITV between 1979 and 1988. A ratings success for ITV and an overseas hit, it drew in stars such as Joan Collins, Ian Holm and Denholm Elliott to appear in an episode. The series was released to tie in with Dahl's short story anthology of the same name, which had introduced readers to many motifs that were common in his writing. The series was an anthology of different tales, each underscored by deathly black humour, that were initially based on Dahl's short stories. The stories were sometimes sinister, sometimes wryly comedic and usually had a twist ending. Dahl introduced on camera all the episodes of the first two series, which bore the full title Roald Dahl's Tales of the Unexpected.

=== Influences ===
A major part of Dahl's literary influences stemmed from his childhood. In his younger days, he was an avid reader, especially awed by fantastic tales of heroism and triumph. He met his idol, Beatrix Potter, when he was six years old. His other favourite authors included Rudyard Kipling, Charles Dickens, William Makepeace Thackeray and former Royal Navy officer Frederick Marryat, and their works made a lasting mark on his life and writing. He named Marryat's Mr Midshipman Easy as his favourite novel. Joe Sommerlad in The Independent writes, "Dahl's novels are often dark affairs, filled with cruelty, bereavement and Dickensian adults prone to gluttony and sadism. The author clearly felt compelled to warn his young readers about the evils of the world, taking the lesson from earlier fairy tales that they could stand hard truths and would be the stronger for hearing them."

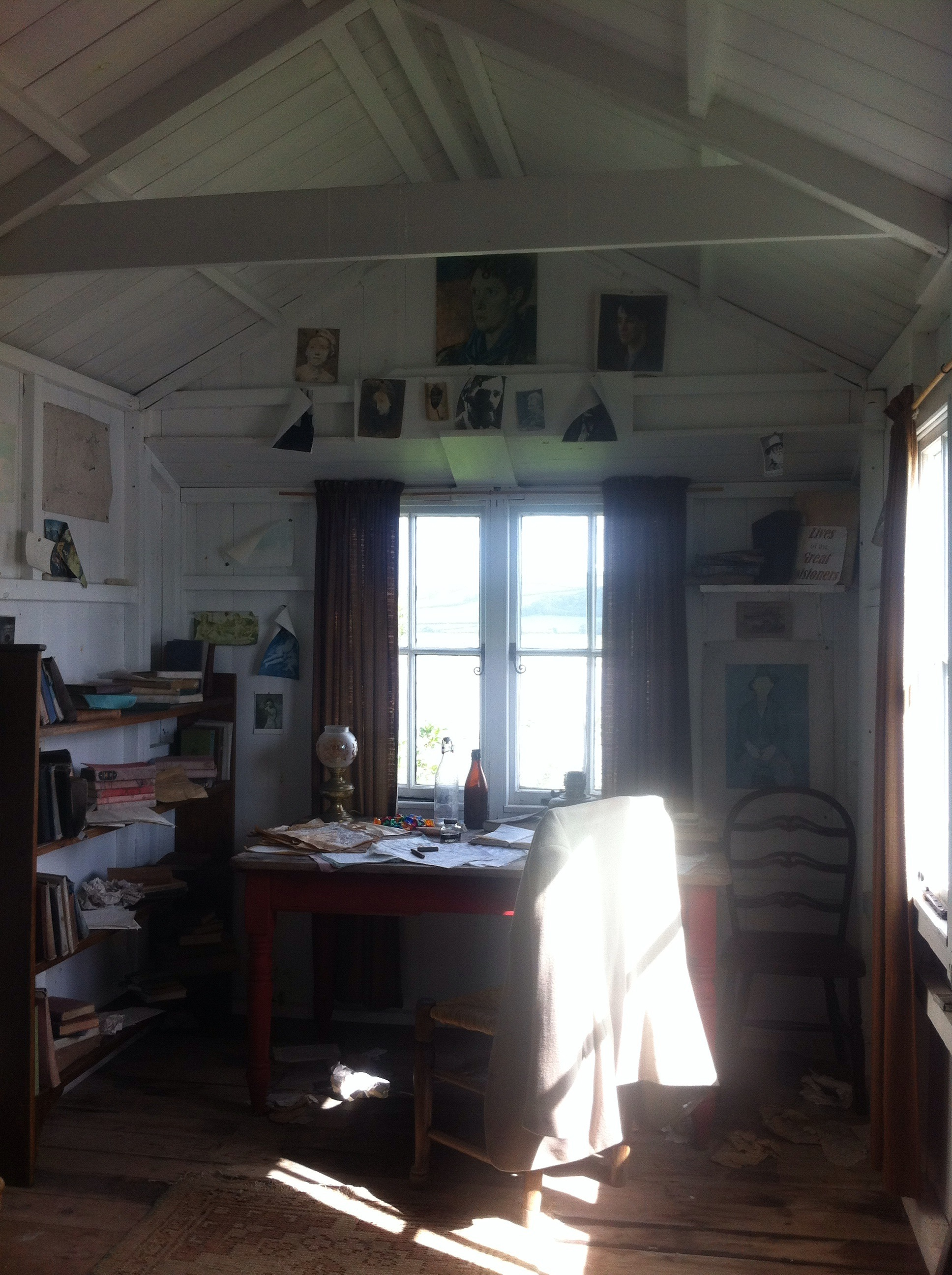
Interior of Dylan Thomas's writing shed; Dahl made a replica of it in his own garden in Great Missenden, where he wrote many of his stories.

Dahl was also influenced by Lewis Carroll's Alice's Adventures in Wonderland. The "Drink Me" episode in Alice inspired a scene in Dahl's George's Marvellous Medicine where a tyrannical grandmother drinks a potion and is blown up to the size of a farmhouse. Finding too many distractions in his house, Dahl remembered the poet Dylan Thomas had found a peaceful shed to write in close to home. Dahl travelled to visit Thomas's hut in Carmarthenshire, Wales in the 1950s and, after taking a look inside, decided to make a replica of it in his own garden in Great Missenden, Buckinghamshire to write his stories in. When he appeared on BBC Radio 4's Desert Island Discs in October 1979, Dahl named Thomas "the greatest poet of our time", and as one of his eight chosen records selected Thomas's reading of his poem "Fern Hill".

Dahl liked ghost stories, and claimed that Trolls by Jonas Lie was one of the finest ever written in the genre. Having read 749 supernatural tales from an array of writers at the British Museum before choosing 14 that he considered the best, he included Lie's tale in his 1983 collection, Roald Dahl's Book of Ghost Stories. While he was still a youngster, his mother, Sofie Dahl, related traditional Norwegian myths and legends from her native homeland to Dahl and his sisters. Dahl always maintained that his mother and her stories had a strong influence on his writing. In one interview, he mentioned: "She was a great teller of tales. Her memory was prodigious and nothing that ever happened to her in her life was forgotten." When Dahl started writing and publishing his famous books for children, he included a grandmother character in The Witches, and later said that she was based directly on his own mother as a tribute.

== Death and legacy ==
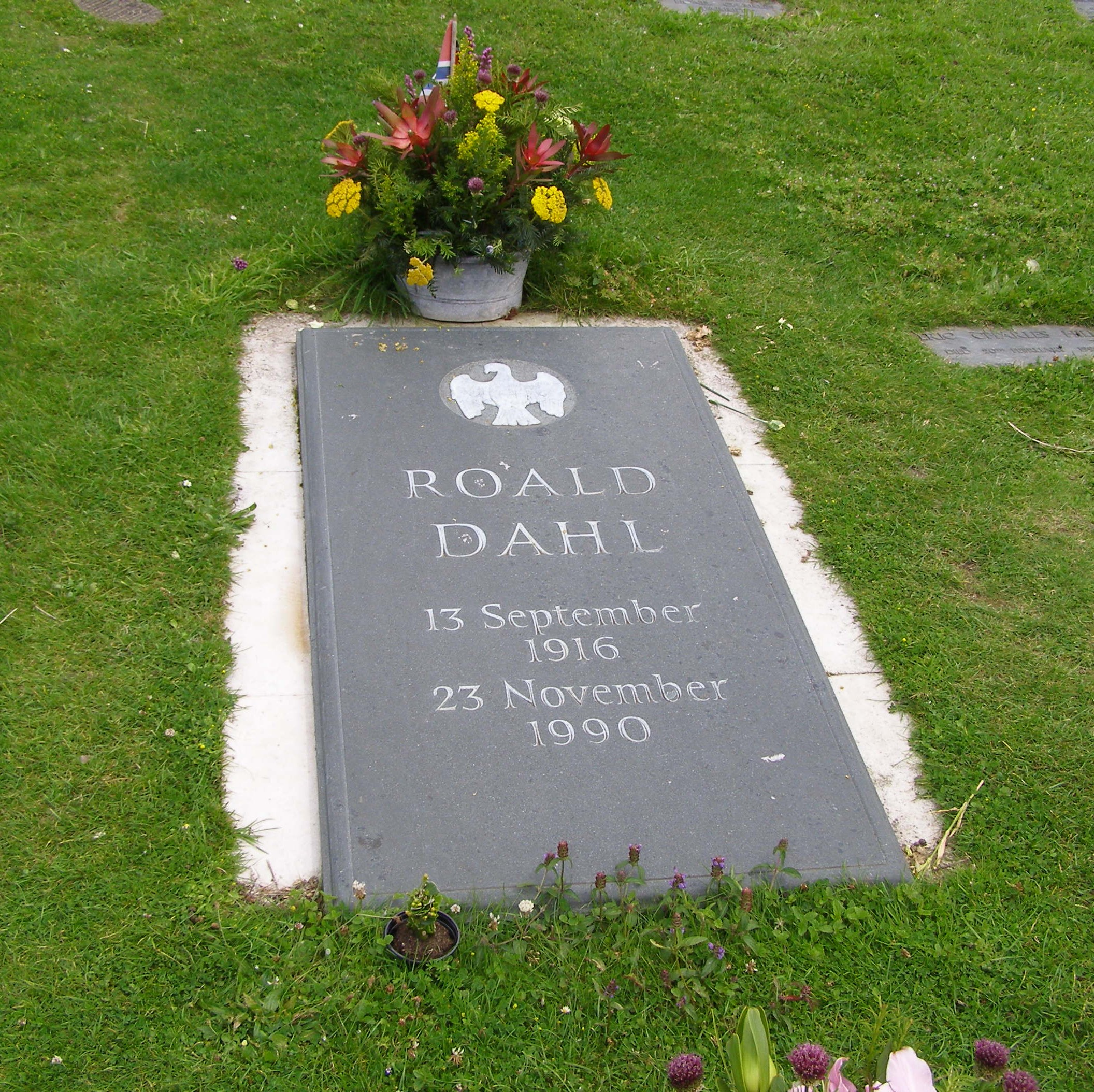
Dahl's gravestone, Church of St Peter and St Paul, Great Missenden, Buckinghamshire

Roald Dahl died on 23 November 1990, at the age of 74 of a rare cancer of the blood, myelodysplastic syndrome, in Oxford, and was buried in the cemetery at the Church of St Peter and St Paul, Great Missenden, Buckinghamshire, England. His obituary in The Times was titled "Death silences Pied Piper of the macabre". According to his granddaughter, the family gave him a "sort of Viking funeral". He was buried with his snooker cues, some burgundy, chocolates, HB pencils and a power saw. Today, children continue to leave toys and flowers by his grave.

In 1996, the Roald Dahl Children's Gallery was opened at the Buckinghamshire County Museum in Aylesbury, which is 10 miles (16 km) from Great Missenden. The main-belt asteroid 6223 Dahl, discovered by Czech astronomer Antonín Mrkos, was named in his memory in 1996.

In 2002, one of Cardiff Bay's modern landmarks, the Oval Basin plaza, was renamed Roald Dahl Plass. Plass is Norwegian for "place" or "square", alluding to the writer's Norwegian roots. There have also been calls from the public for a permanent statue of him to be erected in Cardiff. In 2016, the city celebrated the centenary of Dahl's birth in Llandaff. Welsh Arts organisations, including National Theatre Wales, Wales Millennium Centre and Literature Wales, came together for a series of events, titled Roald Dahl 100, including a Cardiff-wide City of the Unexpected, which marked his legacy.

Roald Dahl Plass

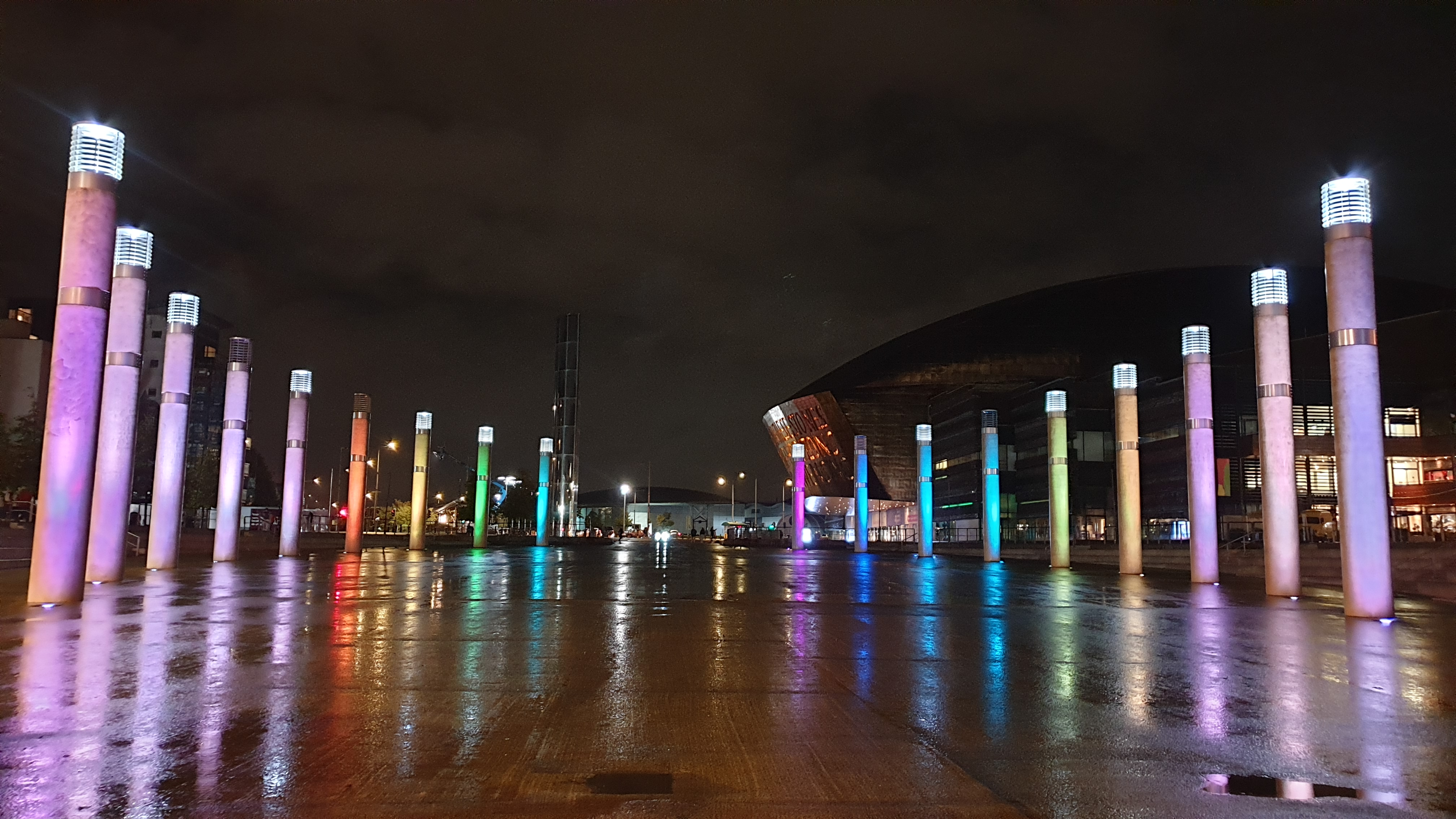
Roald Dahl Plass in Cardiff, Wales, illuminated at night

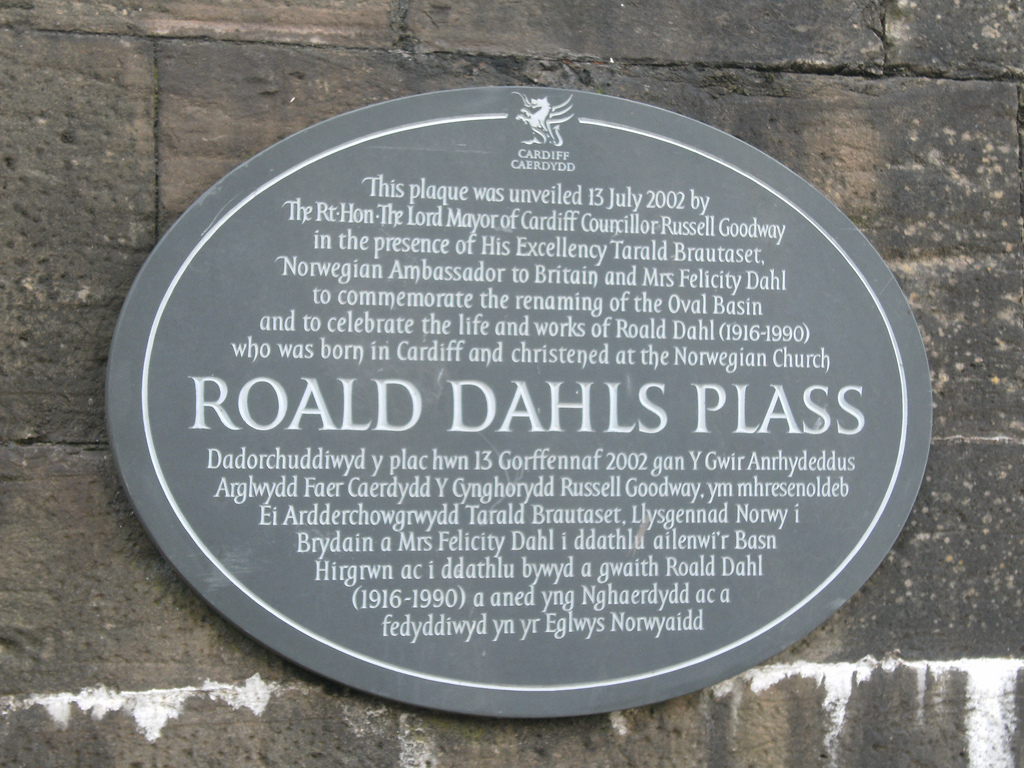
Commemorative plaque

Dahl's charitable commitments in the fields of neurology, haematology and literacy during his life have been continued by his widow since his death, through Roald Dahl's Marvellous Children's Charity, formerly known as the Roald Dahl Foundation. The charity provides care and support to seriously ill children and young people throughout Britain. In June 2005, the Roald Dahl Museum and Story Centre in the author's home village Great Missenden was officially opened by Cherie Blair, wife of then British Prime Minister Tony Blair, to celebrate the work of Roald Dahl and advance his work in literacy education. Over 50,000 visitors from abroad, mainly from Australia, Germany, Japan, and the United States, travel to the village museum every year.

In 2008, the UK charity BookTrust and Children's Laureate Michael Rosen inaugurated The Roald Dahl Funny Prize, an annual award to authors of humorous children's fiction. On 14 September 2009 (the day after what would have been Dahl's 93rd birthday) the first blue plaque in his honour was unveiled in Llandaff. Rather than commemorating his place of birth, however, the plaque was erected on the wall of the former sweet shop (and site of "The Great Mouse Plot of 1924") that features in the first part of his autobiography Boy. It was unveiled by his widow Felicity and son Theo. In 2018, Weston-super-Mare, the town described by Dahl as a "seedy seaside resort", unveiled a blue plaque dedicated to him, on the site of the since-demolished boarding school Dahl attended, St Peter's. The anniversary of Dahl's birthday on 13 September is celebrated as "Roald Dahl Day" in Africa, Latin America, and the United Kingdom.

In honour of Dahl, the Royal Gibraltar Post Office issued a set of four stamps in 2010 featuring Quentin Blake's original illustrations for four of the children's books written by Dahl during his long career: The BFG, The Twits, Charlie and the Chocolate Factory, and Matilda. A set of six commemorative Royal Mail stamps was issued in 2012, featuring Blake's illustrations for Charlie and the Chocolate Factory, The Witches, The Twits, Matilda, Fantastic Mr Fox, and James and the Giant Peach.

"Arguably the Shakespeare of children's literature, from Fantastic Mr Fox to Matilda and The BFG, filmmakers and animators are still drawing from the enormous vat of material he created."

— "Britain's top ten children's literature superstars". The Independent, 2012.

In 2012, Dahl was featured in the list of The New Elizabethans to mark the diamond Jubilee of Queen Elizabeth II. A panel of seven academics, journalists and historians named Dahl among the group of people in Britain "whose actions during the reign of Elizabeth II have had a significant impact on lives in these islands and given the age its character". In September 2016, Dahl's daughter Lucy received the BBC's Blue Peter Gold badge in his honour, the first time it had ever been awarded posthumously.

Dahl's influence has extended beyond literary figures. For instance, the film director Tim Burton recalled from childhood "the second layer [after Dr. Seuss] of connecting to a writer who gets the idea of the modern fable—and the mixture of light and darkness, and not speaking down to kids, and the kind of politically incorrect humour that kids get. I've always liked that, and it's shaped everything I've felt that I've done." Steven Spielberg read The BFG to his children when they were young, stating the book celebrates the fact that it's OK to be different as well as to have an active imagination: "It's very important that we preserve the tradition of allowing young children to run free with their imaginations and magic and imagination are the same thing." Actress Scarlett Johansson named Fantastic Mr Fox one of the five books that made a difference to her.

Dahl has an incredibly distinctive style: his subversive, unpredictable plots, musical prose and caustic wit are impossible to imitate. And yet his stories have proved astonishingly malleable. Often adapted by equally idiosyncratic writers and directors, when translated onto stage and screen, his works seamlessly take on the impression of their new maker. Like in many of his stories, Dahl offers a narrative where troublemaking is rewarded, and games and tricks are more successful than following rules. Perhaps this, more than anything, is the reason why Dahl's stories excite the imagination of so many adults and children, and why so many storytellers across stage and screen can't resist remaking his tales in their own individual style. Right across his body of work, playfulness and inventiveness are always prized over boring qualities like obedience and deference. In Dahl's world, creative disruption is presented in such an appealing, delicious light, that you can't help but join in the fun.

— Anna Leskiewicz in The Telegraph, "Why we love the mischievous spirit of Roald Dahl".

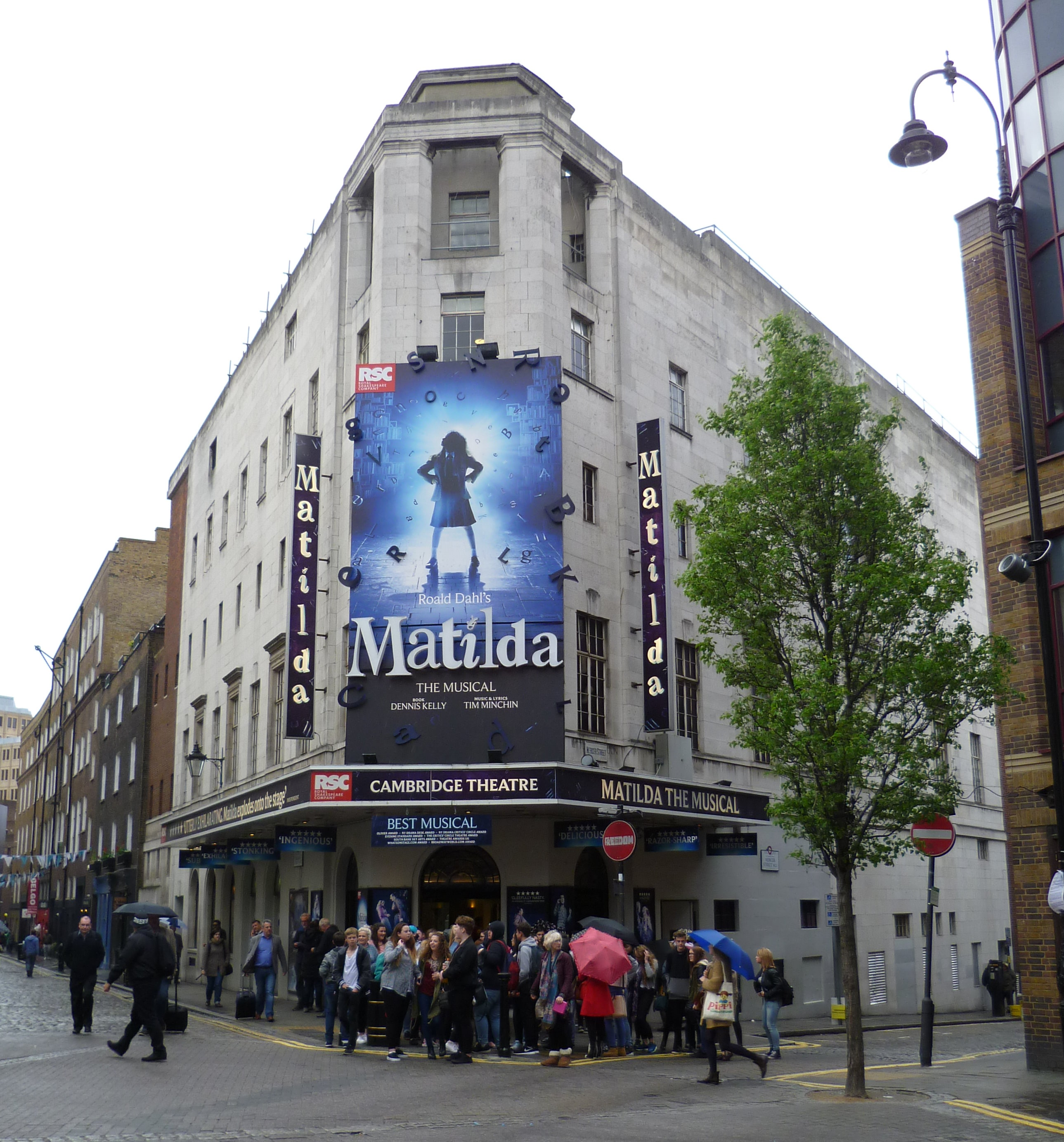
Matilda the Musical has been shown in the West End in London (pictured) since November 2011, and on Broadway in New York between 2013 and 2017

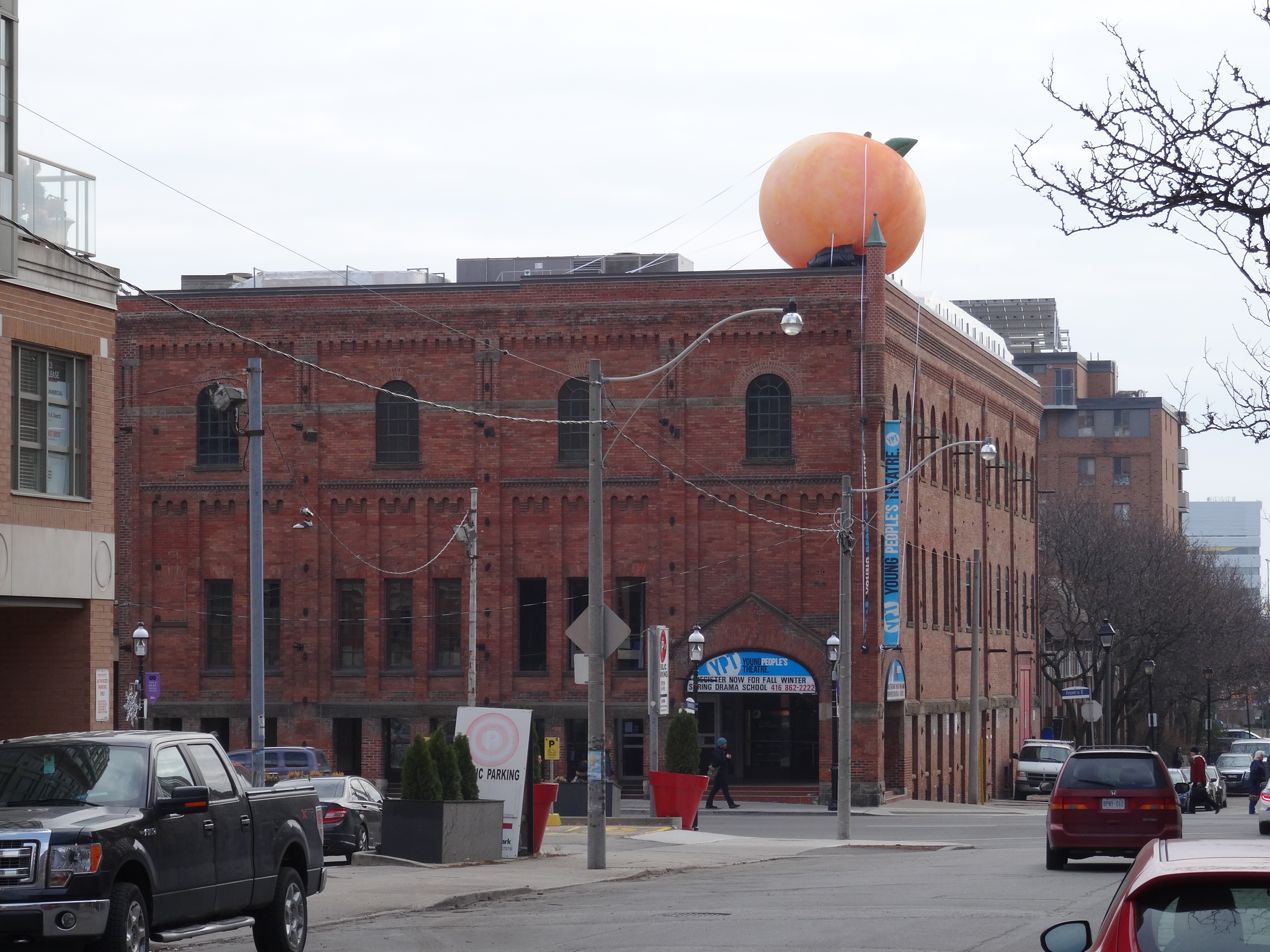
James and the Giant Peach musical playing at the Young People's Theatre in Toronto, 2014

Regarded as "one of the greatest storytellers for children of the 20th century", Dahl was named by The Times one of the 50 greatest British writers since 1945. He ranks amongst the world's best-selling fiction authors with sales estimated at over 300 million, and his books have been published in 63 languages. In 2000, Dahl topped the list of Britain's favourite authors. In 2003, four books by Dahl, led by Charlie and the Chocolate Factory at number 35, ranked among the Top 100 in The Big Read, a survey of the British public by the BBC to determine the "nation's best-loved novel" of all time. In surveys of British teachers, parents and students, Dahl is frequently ranked the best children's writer. He won the first three Australian BILBY Younger Readers Award; for Matilda, The BFG, and Charlie and the Chocolate Factory.

In a 2006 list for the Royal Society of Literature, Harry Potter creator J. K. Rowling named Charlie and the Chocolate Factory one of her top ten books every child should read. Critics have commented on the similarities between the Dursley family from Harry Potter and the nightmarish guardians seen in many of Dahl's books, such as Aunt Sponge and Aunt Spiker from James and the Giant Peach, Grandma from George's Marvellous Medicine, and the Wormwoods from Matilda. Barry Cunningham, who as publisher of Bloomsbury signed Rowling, cited his experiences travelling with Dahl in promotional book tours of the UK as helping him see the potential of Rowling's work, stating, "I think it was because I didn't come from a traditional background. I'd come from marketing and promotion. I'd seen how children relate to books". In 2012, Matilda was ranked number 30 among all-time best children's novels in a survey published by School Library Journal, a monthly with primarily US audience. The Top 100 included four books by Dahl, more than any other writer. The American magazine Time named three Dahl books in its list of the 100 Best Young-Adult Books of All Time, more than any other author. Dahl is one of the most borrowed authors in British libraries.

In 2012, Dahl was among the British cultural icons selected by artist Peter Blake to appear in a new version of his most famous artwork—the Beatles' Sgt. Pepper's Lonely Hearts Club Band album cover—to celebrate the British cultural figures of his life he most admires. In 2016 Dahl's enduring popularity was proved by his ranking in Amazon's the top five best-selling children's authors on the online store over the last year, looking at sales in print and on the Kindle store. In a 2017 UK poll of the greatest authors, songwriters, artists and photographers, Dahl was named the greatest storyteller of all time, ranking ahead of Dickens, Shakespeare, Rowling and Spielberg. In 2017, the airline Norwegian announced Dahl's image would appear on the tail fin one of their Boeing 737-800 aircraft. He is one of the company's six "British tail fin heroes", joining Queen singer Freddie Mercury, England World Cup winning captain Bobby Moore, novelist Jane Austen, pioneering pilot Amy Johnson and aviation entrepreneur Freddie Laker.

In September 2021, Netflix acquired the Roald Dahl Story Company in a deal worth more than £500 million ($686 million). A film adaptation of Matilda the Musical was released by Netflix and Sony Pictures Releasing in December 2022, and the cast includes Emma Thompson as Miss Trunchbull. The next Dahl adaptation for Netflix, The Wonderful Story of Henry Sugar, was released in September 2023, with its director Wes Anderson also adapting three additional Dahl short stories for Netflix in 2024. Netflix released Wonka's The Golden Ticket, a reality TV competition series based on the 1971 film, in September 2026.

== Filmography ==
=== Writing roles ===
Year	Title	Role	Notes
1950	Suspense	Story	1 episode
1952	CBS Television Workshop	Story	1 episode
1952	Lux Video Theatre	Story	1 episode
1954	Philip Morris Playhouse	Story	1 episode
1954	Danger	Story	1 episode
1955	Star Tonight	Story	1 episode
1955	Cameo Theatre	Story	1 episode
1958	Suspicion	Story	1 episode
1958–61	Alfred Hitchcock Presents	Story	7 episodes
1961	'Way Out	Story	1 episode
1962	That Was the Week That Was	Story	1 episode
1964	36 Hours	Story	Feature film
1965–67	Thirty-Minute Theatre	Story	3 episodes
1967	You Only Live Twice	Screenplay	Feature film
1968	Late Night Horror	Writer	1 episode
1968	Chitty Chitty Bang Bang	Screenplay	Feature film
1968	Jackanory	Screenplay	10 episodes
1971	The Road Builder	Screenplay	Feature film
1971	Willy Wonka & the Chocolate Factory	Story/screenplay	Feature film
1979–88	Tales of the Unexpected	Writer/story	26 episodes
1985	The New Alfred Hitchcock Presents	Story	1 episode
1989	The BFG	Story	Feature film
1989	The Book Tower	Writer	1 episode
1989	Danny, the Champion of the World	Story	TV movie

=== Presenting roles ===
Year	Title	Role	Notes
1961	'Way Out	Host	5 episodes
1965	Thirty-Minute Theatre	Narrator	1 episode

=== Non-presenting appearances ===
Year	Title	Role	Notes
1978	Read All About It	Himself	1 episode
1978	This Is Your Life	Himself	1 episode
1979–85	Tales of the Unexpected	Himself	32 episodes
1989	Going Live!	Himself	1 episode

== See also ==
- List of people who have declined a British honour
