= Roald Dahl's Marvellous Children's Charity =

British charitable organization

- Formation: September 26, 1991; 34 years ago
- Founder: Felicity Dahl
- Registration no.: 1137409
- Purpose: Provides specialist nurses to support seriously ill children and their families.
- Headquarters: Buckinghamshire, United Kingdom
- Chief Executive: Louise Griew
- Co-president: Felicity Dahl
- Co-president: Quentin Blake
- Royal Patron: Queen Camilla
- Website: www.roalddahlcharity.org
- Formerly called: The Roald Dahl Foundation

Roald Dahl's Marvellous Children's Charity is a charitable organization based in the United Kingdom. The charity was founded in 1991 as the Roald Dahl Foundation by Felicity Dahl, in memory of her husband, children's author Roald Dahl. The charity provides specialist support for seriously ill children across the UK by sponsoring 'Roald Dahl Nurse Specialists' roles who work within NHS Trusts to provide practical and emotional support to children with complex, often life-long, medical conditions. The charity also provides support services for the families of children with complex medical needs, and financial grants.

== Roald Dahl nurse specialists ==
The charity works with the National Health Service to provide specialist nurses known as 'Roald Dahl' nurses to work within NHS trusts. There are over 120 such clinical nurse specialists currently working in trusts across the country. The Roald Dahl nurses are jointly funded by the charity and the trusts in a 5-year programme, the charity paying for the first 2 years of employment, and the trust paying for the remaining 3 years. The nurses specialise in areas such as haematology, epilepsy, rare diseases, neuromuscular conditions, care for children with complex lifetime medical needs, or in supporting child patients to transition to adult healthcare.

The nurses work with patients with complex needs, supporting them and their families to understand and better manage their health conditions, as well as acting as a liaison between the parents and other medical care providers. Providing support that improves the patients' well-being and reduces their utilisation of other medical resources. In 2020, a 2-year project (partly funded by the charity) to evaluate the effectiveness of the Roald Dahl nurses described the concept as a 'new model of paediatric nursing' and found that the nurses improved both the quality and experience of care of patients and their families.

== History and patrons ==
The Roald Dahl foundation was founded in 1991 by Felicity Dahl, in honour of her recently deceased husband, with the support of Roald's long-time illustrator Quentin Blake, the charity was originally focussed on supporting children with neurological and haematological conditions, as well as supporting child literacy initiatives. The charity was re-named Roald Dahl's Marvellous Children's Charity in 2010, and expanded its work to support children with complex medical conditions more widely.

Queen Camilla (then Duchess of Cornwall), became the charity's Royal Patron in 2017, and has regularly involved children supported by the charity in Christmas events, as well as supporting the charity in International Nurses Day celebrations. The charity has a number of celebrity patrons including the actress Dame Joanna Lumley, television presenter Claudia Winkleman, and Tim Minchin, composer and lyricist for Matilda the Musical.
