= Memories with Food at Gipsy House =

Book by Roald Dahl

Memories with Food At Gipsy House
- First edition
- Author: Roald Dahl & Felicity Dahl
- Illustrator: Jan Baldwin
- Language: English
- Publisher: Viking Press
- Publication date: 1991
- Publication place: United Kingdom
- Media type: Print (Hardback)
- Pages: 240
- ISBN: 978-0-670-83462-4
- OCLC: 24877261

Memories with Food at Gipsy House is a collection of anecdotes and recipes by Roald Dahl and his second wife, Felicity, first published in 1991.

The book was reissued in softcover in 1996 under the title Roald Dahl's Cookbook.

== Editions ==
- ISBN 978-0-670-83462-4 (First Edition, 1991)
