= Felicity Dahl =

Wife of Roald Dahl (born 1938)

Dame Felicity Dahl DBE
- Born: Felicity Ann D'Abreu; 12 December 1938 (age 87); Cardiff, Wales
- Other name: Liccy
- Spouses: Charles Reginald Hugh Crosland (m. 1959; div. 1971); Roald Dahl (m. 1983; died 1990)
- Children: 3

Dame Felicity Ann Dahl (née D'Abreu; born 12 December 1938) is the widow of the author Roald Dahl. She was previously married to Charles Reginald Hugh Crosland. The quietly spoken Dahl gave a rare interview in November 2008 to publicise the inaugural Roald Dahl Funny Prize and reflect on her years with the late author.

== Early life ==
In December 1938, Felicity D'Abreu was born in Llandaff, a district in the north of Cardiff, in Wales. It was the birthplace of her future husband Roald Dahl in 1916.

She is the daughter of Dr. Alphonsus D'Abreu and Elizabeth Throckmorton (granddaughter of Sir Richard Charles Acton Throckmorton, 10th Baronet) and the niece of Lt.-Col. Francis D'Abreu who was married to Margaret Bowes-Lyon, the first cousin of Queen Elizabeth the Queen Mother.

== Career ==
=== Film production ===
Dahl served as producer of the 1996 film Matilda and was executive producer of the 2005 film Charlie and the Chocolate Factory. Her three preferred choices for the role of Willy Wonka in the film were Eddie Izzard, David Walliams and Dustin Hoffman, but she heartily approved of the casting of Johnny Depp.

Her name "Liccy Dahl" was used as inspiration for the doll owned by Miss Honey in the 1996 Matilda film adaptation.

=== Charity work ===
Felicity Dahl founded the Roald Dahl Foundation in 1991 which helped young people with brain, blood and literacy problems. This organisation became Roald Dahl's Marvellous Children's Charity in 2010, focusing on supporting seriously ill children. She is co-president and an active supporter even after retiring as a trustee in the mid 2010s. She also founded the Roald Dahl Museum and Story Centre in Great Missenden, opened in 2005, which is devoted to storytelling and literacy.

== Personal life ==
In 1959, Felicity D'Abreu married Charles Reginald Hugh Crosland. They had three daughters. In 1971, she divorced Crosland.

She met Roald Dahl in 1972 while she was working as a set designer on an advert for Maxim coffee with the author's then-wife, American actress Patricia Neal. Soon after the pair were introduced, they began an 11-year affair. They wed after his divorce in 1983, at Brixton Town Hall in South London. She gave up her job and moved into Gipsy House, in Great Missenden in Buckinghamshire, which had been Roald Dahl's home since 1954. He died seven years later in 1990, at Oxford's John Radcliffe Hospital.

In 1991, she published Memories with Food at Gipsy House, a collection of anecdotes and recipes that she had written with her late husband.

On 14 September 2009 the first blue plaque in Roald Dahl's honour was unveiled at a sweet shop in Llandaff. Dahl was present for the unveiling of the plaque dedicated to her late husband.

Dahl was appointed Dame Commander of the Order of the British Empire (DBE) in the 2024 New Year Honours for services to philanthropy, literature and young people.

== Filmography ==
Year	Title	Role	Notes
1996	Matilda	Producer	Feature film
2005	Imagine	Herself	1 episode
2005	Charlie and the Chocolate Factory	Executive producer	Feature film
2009	Fantastic Mr. Fox	Special thanks	Feature film
2011	BBC Breakfast	Herself	1 episode
2019	A Shaun the Sheep Movie: Farmageddon	Special thanks	Feature film
2023	Chicken Run: Dawn of the Nugget	Special thanks	Feature film
