= Roald Dahl Museum and Story Centre =

Biographical museum in Great Missenden, England

Coordinates: 51°42′09″N 0°42′22″W

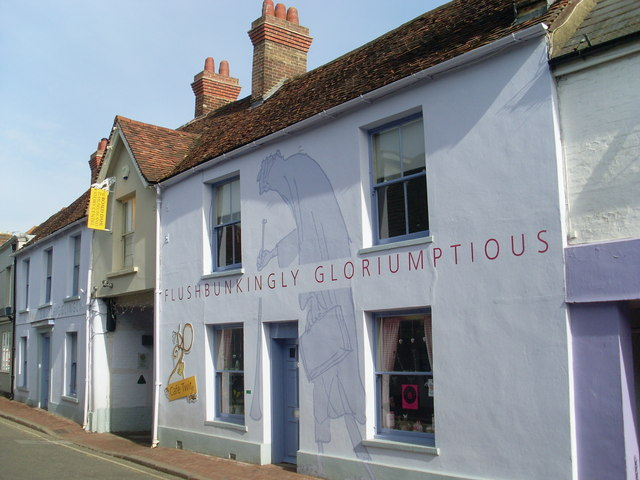
The Roald Dahl Museum and Story Centre, Great Missenden, Buckinghamshire

The Roald Dahl Museum and Story Centre is a museum in the village of Great Missenden in Buckinghamshire, England. Children's and short story writer Roald Dahl lived in the village in Gipsy House for 36 years until his death in 1990.

== Overview ==
The museum was officially opened on 10 June 2005 by Cherie Blair and open to the public on 11 June 2005. It is housed in an old coaching inn and yard, which has been converted into a museum at a cost of £4.5 million. Funding was provided by the Dahl family, Dahl's publishers, charitable foundations and corporate and private donors. The museum houses all of Dahl's main papers: his manuscripts, business and personal correspondence and his "Ideas Books". It also offers regular workshops and hosts events that help to enhance creativity and writing skills. It is run by an independent registered charity.

In 2008 the museum won the "Best Small Visitor Attraction" award from Enjoy England, the website of the country's official tourist board.

== See also ==
- Roald Dahl's Marvellous Children's Charity – a children's charity also founded by the Dahl family.
- Roald Dahl Children's Gallery – part of the Buckinghamshire County Museum in Aylesbury
- Seven Stories – a museum and visitor centre in Newcastle upon Tyne dedicated to children's literature
- The Story Museum – a museum based at Rochester House, Pembroke Street in Oxford
