= Gipsy House =

Former home of Roald Dahl

Coordinates: 51°41′58.4″N 00°42′32.2″W

Gipsy House (formerly Little Whitefield) is a house in the village of Great Missenden in the English county of Buckinghamshire. It was the home of the writer Roald Dahl and his family for several decades. The house is situated on Whitefield Lane, an old drovers' road on the outskirts of the village. It is currently privately owned but the writing hut is on display at Roald Dahl Museum and Story Centre.

== The house ==
Dahl and his first wife, Patricia Neal, bought the house at auction for £4,500 (equivalent to £106,956 in 2025) in March 1954 after hearing of the house from Dahl's mother, Sofie Magdalene Dahl. Half of the purchase price came from Dahl's mother, the other half from Neal herself. The couple visited the house for the first time six weeks later. The property was owned by the Stewart-Liberty family and had previously been home to tenant farmers and a young solicitor and his family. The house was set in 6 acres (2.4 ha) of grounds with three bedrooms, with an apple and pear tree orchard with two water wells. The house is symmetrical, white and surrounded by gardens, with a brick wall along the perimeter of the property to the road. The design of the house has been likened to an "18th-century doll's house".

The house required extensive renovations and remodelling and the installation of electricity. The couple moved into the house in July 1954. Dahl renamed the house Little Whitefield to make it distinct from his sister's house, also named Whitefield. The house was renamed Gipsy House in 1960 after a family of Roma people who would camp in fields on top of the lane.

An annex, intended as a guest wing, was built in May 1961 on the east side of the house. Dahl used it to restore antiques. The house was greatly extended over the decades as Dahl's family grew. A two-storey addition on the west side is the site of the present kitchen, dining room and spare room, but was originally built as a snooker room. The snooker room was resited in another annex built in the garden with additional bedrooms. A local builder, Wally Saunders, helped Dahl with much of the work of remodelling the house, and provided the inspiration for Dahl's BFG character.

Elizabeth Day, writing in The Guardian, described the house as "an oversized cottage with low ceilings and yellow- and rose-painted rooms". Dahl's widow, Felicity Dahl, said in a 2008 interview with The Guardian that "people have strong reactions" to the house; the film director Tim Burton cried on the lawn of Gipsy House after coming there to research for his film adaptation of Charlie and the Chocolate Factory.

== Garden ==
An acre of formal gardens separated by bordered rooms including a vegetable garden, a maze and an orchard, surround the house. Dahl remodelled the garden in the early 1960s and planted 200 roses. Dahl also grew vegetables in the garden and laid a path to his writing hut. Dahl was passionate about growing onions and orchids and a garden bench at the house has a carved back resembling a string of onions. Dahl would cheat at onion growing competitions with locals, ordering special seeds from growers. Dahl did not plant the garden himself due to his back pain from injuries from World War II. The main horticultural development of the garden occurred after Dahl's marriage to Felicity Crosland in 1983. Several animals lived in the garden in the 1950s and 60s including a tortoise, hens and a rabbit.

A teahouse in the garden was converted into an aviary for parakeets and the hundreds of budgerigars who roamed the countryside during the day would roost there at night. It was inspired by one that Dahl had seen at Moyns Park, an Elizabethan country house in Essex, the home of his friend Ivar Bryce. The bird house was filled with large green bottles in 2008.

The gardens feature several curiosities; stones at the entrance to the maze are inscribed with lines from Dahl's books and a piece of jade sent to Dahl by an Australian child is set into the garden path along with old pennies. The front lawn of the house has two manhole covers, one decorated with the design of the Queen of Hearts and the other of Ace of Spades in reference to Dahl's love of the card game blackjack.

In 1960 Dahl bought a vardo from his sister, Alfhild and her husband Leslie. It had been bought by Dahl's sister for Bert Edmonds, a Romanichal neighbour. The caravan still sits in the garden.

=== Writing hut ===
Dahl wrote in a writing hut in the garden of Gipsy House. The creation of the hut was inspired by Dahl's visit to the Welsh poet Dylan Thomas's writing hut near his Boathouse in the Carmarthenshire town of Laugharne. Dahl visited Thomas's house in the 1950s.

The hut was rebuilt by local builder Wally Saunders to the same proportions as Thomas's hut. Dahl told BBC Radio 4's Desert Island Discs programme in 1979 that he wrote in "A little hut, curtains drawn so I don't see the squirrels up in the apple trees in the orchard. The light on, right away from the house, no vacuum cleaners, nothing...When I am in this place it is my little nest. My womb". In 2008 Elizabeth Day, visiting the house for The Guardian, described it as having been unchanged since Dahl's death in 1991, looking like a "dilapidated shed, its paint peeling and faded, its tiny windows dusty with disuse" and that "Everything is in place, exactly as it should be, except the person who made it so". Most of the space in the hut is taken up with Dahl's green "wing-back armchair" in which he sat when writing, he would also rest his legs on an old suitcase and cover them with a sleeping bag to keep warm. The chair had formerly belonged to Dahl's mother and he had a hole cut in the chair to relieve the pain from an abscess on his back. A table in the shed held a variety of objects including a ball of crushed silver foil KitKat chocolate wrappers, a brass ornament of a Spitfire plane and his hip bone kept after his hip replacement. A mug was filled with pencils. Heat came from an electric heater "perilously rigged up to the ceiling with string". The curtains were almost always drawn in the hut and the only light came from an anglepoise lamp. Dahl would discard rejected pages into a rubbish bin by his side. Books and a filing cabinet were at his other side. Dahl wrote with Dixon Ticonderoga pencils on yellow A4 pads, resting on a piece of wood on a cardboard tube.

A public appeal was made in 2011 to save the hut which was in "imminent danger of falling apart due to decay". The cost of moving the hut to the Roald Dahl Museum and Story Centre in Great Missenden High Street was estimated at £500,000 by Dahl's granddaughter, Sophie Dahl who said that the hut was like an "ancient tomb" and that "there was something still quite sacred about it". The appeal was met with criticism due to the perceived wealth of the Dahl family.

The mythology surrounding Dahl's hut and his authorial public status was critiqued by the academic Laura Viñas Valle in her 2016 book De-constructing Dahl. Valle compared the preserving of Dahl's hut to "what seemed to be a process of embalming, reminiscent of Ancient Egypt" and critiqued the legend of the lone genius and myth making perpetrated by the image of Dahl alone in his hut. Valle argued that such myth making negated the important role that his literary editors had in shaping his work for publication.

The writing hut was reproduced in Wes Anderson's 2009 film adaptation of Dahl's 1970 novel Fantastic Mr Fox and his 2023 film adaptation of 1977’s The Wonderful Story of Henry Sugar and Six More.

== Sources ==
- Sturrock, Donald (2011). Storyteller: The Authorized Biography of Roald Dahl. Simon and Schuster. ISBN 978-1-4391-8976-4.
- Treglown, Jeremy (28 June 2016). Roald Dahl: A Biography. Open Road Media. ISBN 978-1-5040-3859-1.
