= Great Missenden =

Village in Buckinghamshire, England

Coordinates: 51°42′15″N 00°42′28″W

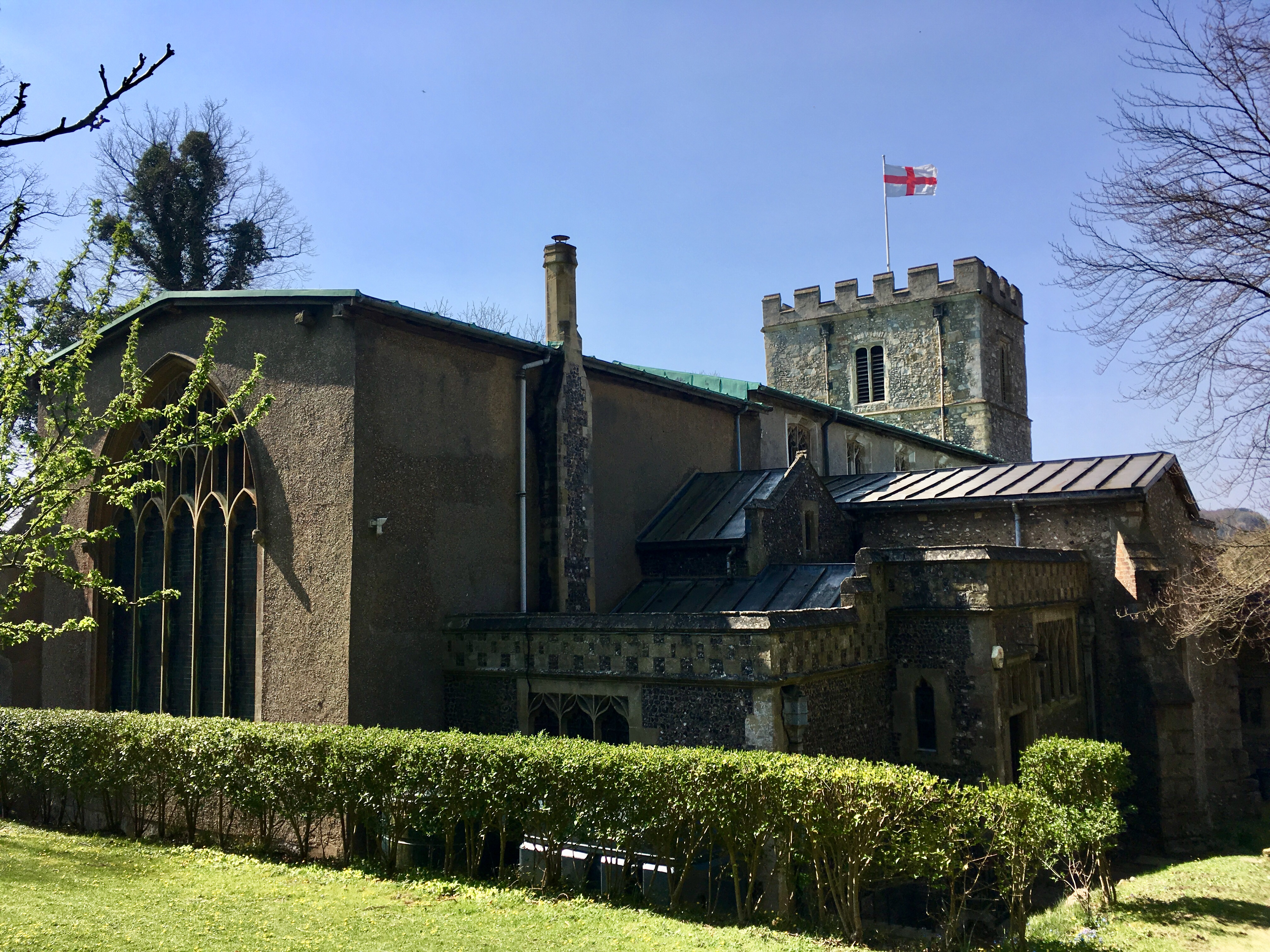
- Church of St Peter and St Paul

- Location within Buckinghamshire
- Population: 10,138 (Census 2011.Civil Parish)
- OS grid reference: SP8901
  - London: 38 miles (61 km)
- Civil parish: Great Missenden
- Unitary authority: Buckinghamshire
- Ceremonial county: Buckinghamshire
- Region: South East
- Country: England
- Sovereign state: United Kingdom
- Post town: GREAT MISSENDEN
- Postcode district: HP16
- Dialling code: 01494
- Police: Thames Valley
- Fire: Buckinghamshire
- Ambulance: South Central
- UK Parliament: Mid Buckinghamshire
- Website: Great Missenden Parish Council

Great Missenden is a village and civil parish in the Misbourne Valley of the Chiltern Hills, in Buckinghamshire, England. It is situated between the towns of Amersham and Wendover; it adjoins the village of Little Kingshill, and is 1 mile (1.6 km) from Little Missenden and the village of Prestwood. The village is now best known as home to the late Roald Dahl, the world-famous adult and children's author.

== Etymology ==
The name Missenden is first attested in the Domesday Book as Missedene, with other early attestations including the spellings Messedena and Musindone. The -den element probably comes from Old English denu, meaning "valley", but the etymology of the first element is uncertain. It is thought to occur in the name of the River Misbourne, which rises in Great Missenden, and also in the Hertfordshire place-name Miswell. Frank Stenton and Allen Mawer guessed that it came from a hypothetical Anglo-Saxon personal name Myrsa, which they also supposed to be found in the name of Mursley.

Eilert Ekwall suggested that the name Missenden came from a lost Old English word related to English moss, and to Danish mysse and Swedish missne (which denote plants of the genus Calla, such as water arum). Recent researchers have tentatively preferred Ekwall's guess, in which case the name Missenden would once have meant something like "valley where water-plants/marsh-plants grow".

== History ==
Great Missenden lay on a major route between the Midlands and London. Several coaching inns, particularly the Red Lion (now an estate agency) and The George, provided rest and refreshment for travellers and their horses. The first railway line in the area was, however, routed alongside the Grand Union Canal to the east. Once the mailcoaches stopped running, the village declined in importance and prosperity, becoming an agricultural town. Following the arrival of the Metropolitan Railway (later the London Underground's Metropolitan line) in 1892, Great Missenden became a village where writers, entertainers and even prime ministers resided.

The village is overlooked by the medieval Church of England parish church, the Church of St Peter and St Paul, whereas the High Street itself is home to the Catholic Church of The Immaculate Heart of Mary, one of the largest Catholic churches in the Chiltern District. The position of the parish church away from the town centre suggests an earlier settlement around the church, with a move of the village's heart to its present location in the early Middle Ages. In the twelfth century, Great Missenden was granted a charter allowing it to hold an annual fair in August. Missenden Abbey, founded in 1133 as an Augustinian monastery, was ruined following the Dissolution of the Monasteries, and the remains were incorporated into a Georgian mansion; it is now a conference centre.

Gipsy House was the home of author Roald Dahl, from 1954 until his death in 1990, and still remains in the family. Many local scenes and characters are reflected in his work. Dahl is buried at St. Peter and St. Paul's Church; his children still leave toys and flowers at his grave. In June 2005, the Roald Dahl Museum and Story Centre opened in the village to honour his work.

Robert Louis Stevenson, the writer of famous works such as Treasure Island and the Strange Case of Dr Jekyll and Mr Hyde, stayed a night at The Red Lion, now 62 High Street, in October 1874, which he wrote in an essay called "An Autumn Effect".

The espionage novelist David Cornwell, who wrote as John le Carré, noted in a posthumously published introduction to a 2021 reissue of his first novel, Call for the Dead, that "I lived in Great Missenden in those days and commuted to Marylebone station."

== Geography ==
Great Missenden is located in the centre of the Chilterns Area of Outstanding Natural Beauty. The source of the river Misbourne is to be found just north of the village, although its upper reach runs only in winter and the perennial head is in Little Missenden.

The following villages and hamlets lie within or close to Great Missenden:

- Ballinger, located north-east of the village, between Lee Common and Ballinger Common
- Ballinger Bottom, to the north-east, near South Heath
- Ballinger Common, to the north-east, near Ballinger
- Bryant's Bottom, west of Prestwood, near Speen
- Frith-hill, to the east
- Heath End, near to the border with Hughenden parish, near Great Kingshill
- Hotley Bottom, north of Prestwood
- Hyde End, between South Heath and Hyde Heath
- Hyde Heath, near Little Missenden
- Little Wood Corner, south of South Heath
- Mobwell, in village
- Prestwood, a large village to the west
- South Heath, to the north-east.

== Demography ==
At the 2021 UK census, the Great Missenden electoral ward recorded the following statistics:

- It had a population of 9,955; ethnicity was 94% white, 2.6% mixed race, 2.5% Asian and 0.9% other.
- The place of birth of residents was 91.3% UK, 3.4% EU, 4.1% Middle East and Asia, 1.5% Africa and 1.87% other.
- Religion was recorded as 54.2% Christian (down from 69.9% in the 2011 Census), 0.43% Buddhist, 0.7% Hindu, 0.32% Sikh, 0.33% Jewish and 0.77% Muslim. 37.2% were recorded as having no religion, up from 20.8% in 2011, 0.34% had an alternative religion and 5.7% did not state their religion.
- The economic activity of residents aged 16 and over shows that 40.4% were in full-time employment, 17.4% in part-time employment, 2.0% unemployed, 0.9% were full-time students with jobs and 4.0% were full-time students without jobs.
- Among those economically inactive, 28.3% were retired (up from 19% in 2001), 3.9% were looking after home or family, 1.6% were long-term sick or disabled and 1.2% were inactive for other reasons.
- Of residents in employment, 23.8% worked as managers, directors or senior officials; 23.3% in professional occupations; and 15.4% in associate professional and technical roles. 9.6% were in administrative and secretarial work, 9.2% in skilled trades, 6.6% in caring and leisure services, 5.2% in sales and customer service, 2.3% as process or machine operatives, and 4.6% in elementary occupations.
- Of residents aged 16–74, 37.5% of the population had level 4 qualifications or above, compared to 31.4% nationwide.

== Governance ==
There are two tiers of local government covering Great Missenden, at parish and unitary authority level: Great Missenden Parish Council and Buckinghamshire Council.

It lies is within the Mid Buckinghamshire parliamentary constituency, represented by Greg Smith of the Conservative Party since 2024.

== Education ==
The village is home to the following schools:

- The private Gateway School
- Great Missenden CofE Combined School
- The Misbourne secondary school.

Many children attend the local grammar schools in nearby Amersham, Chesham, Little Chalfont and High Wycombe, as well as other leading local preparatory schools.

== Transport ==
Great Missenden railway station lies on the London to Aylesbury Line. Chiltern Railways operates regular services between London Marylebone, Aylesbury and Aylesbury Vale Parkway. It is the first station on the line that does not fall into a London fare zone.

Two local bus routes are operated by Red Rose Travel and Carousel Buses:

- 41: High Wycombe - Amersham
- 55: Aylesbury - Wendover - Halton - Chesham.

The narrow and historic High Street is bypassed by the main A413 London to Aylesbury Road.

== In popular culture ==
Given its quaint and historic high street, the village has been used extensively as a filming location for TV drama Midsomer Murders.

During 1980, Hammer Film Productions filmed a small series of horror films for television, many of them filmed in and around Great Missenden. Of note is the episode "Rude Awakening", starring Denholm Elliott who plays an estate agent trapped in a recurring nightmare.

== Notable people ==
- Clement Attlee, former prime minister of the United Kingdom
- Adam Carse, composer, lived at Winton, Martin's End Lane until his death in 1958
- David Cornwell (John le Carré), English novelist
- Jamie Cullum, English musician
- Roald Dahl, British writer
- Patricia Neal, American actress
- Geoffrey Palmer, English actor
- Robert Louis Stevenson, Scottish novelist
- Harold Wilson, former prime minister of the United Kingdom.
