= The Color Purple =

1982 novel by Alice Walker

- First edition cover
- Author: Alice Walker
- Language: English
- Publisher: Harcourt Brace Jovanovich
- Publication date: 1982
- Publication place: United States
- Pages: 251
- ISBN: 0-15-119153-0
- OCLC: 8221433
- Dewey Decimal: 813.54 19
- LC Class: PS3573.A425 C6 1982

The Color Purple is a 1982 epistolary novel by American author Alice Walker that won the 1983 Pulitzer Prize for Fiction and the National Book Award for Fiction. (Note: Walker won the 1983 award for hardcover Fiction. From 1980 to 1983 in National Book Awards history there were dual hardcover and paperback awards in most categories. Most of the paperback award-winners were reprints, including the 1983 Fiction.)

The novel has been the target of censors numerous times, and appears on the American Library Association list of the 100 Most Frequently Challenged Books of 2000–2010 at number seventeen because of the sometimes explicit content, particularly in terms of violence. In 2003, the book was listed on the BBC's The Big Read poll of the UK's "best-loved novels."

The novel has been adapted into various other media, including feature films in 1985 and 2023, a 2005 musical, and a 2008 radio serial on Woman's Hour on BBC Radio 4.

== Plot ==
Celie, a poor African-American girl, lives in rural Georgia in the early 1900s. She writes letters to God because her step father Alphonso beats and rapes her. Due to the rape, she gives birth to two children, Olivia and Adam, whom Alphonso takes away. A farmer identified as "Mister" (Mr. __) asks to marry her younger sister Nettie, but Alphonso offers him Celie instead. Celie is abused by Mister and mistreated by his prior children. Nettie runs away and stays with Celie, but Mister eventually makes her leave, after he tries to rape her and she fights back. Nettie promises to write, but Celie never receives any letters, and Celie concludes that she is dead.

Mister's son Harpo marries an assertive girl named Sofia. Celie is impressed by Sofia's self-esteem, but Mister chides Harpo for what he considers weakness in his treatment of Sofia. In a moment of envy, Celie tells Harpo to beat Sofia. Sofia fights back and confronts Celie, who apologizes and confides in her about Mister's abuse.

Shug Avery, a jazz and blues singer and Mister's long-time mistress, moves in. Celie takes care of Shug, who is ill. While Shug is initially rude to Celie, the two become friends and Celie becomes infatuated with Shug. Frustrated by Harpo's domineering behavior, Sofia moves out, taking her children with her. Several months later, Harpo opens a juke joint where a fully recovered Shug performs nightly. Shug continues her affair with Mister. She learns that Mister beats Celie, and vows to stay at the house until she is convinced he will stop. Shug and Celie grow closer, and Celie tells Shug that she has never had an orgasm. Shug convinces Celie to look at her vulva in a mirror and teaches her about her clitoris.

Sofia returns for a visit and gets into a fight with Harpo's new girlfriend, Squeak (Mary Agnes). She has a verbal spat with the mayor's wife, Miss Millie, and after the mayor slaps her, she hits him back. She is beaten by the police and sentenced to 12 years in prison. Squeak tricks the warden, her white uncle, into releasing Sofia from prison and having her work as Miss Millie's maid, which Sofia detests. The plan works, but the warden rapes Squeak. Squeak cares for Sofia's children, and the two women become friends.

Shug returns to town, newly married to a man called Grady. Celie confesses to Shug that her father raped her. While both their husbands are out, Celie and Shug have sex for the first time. Together, they learn that Mister has hidden letters from Nettie for years. In the letters, Nettie says she has befriended a missionary couple, Samuel and Corrine, and gone to Africa with them. Samuel and Corrine had unwittingly adopted Adam and Olivia. Through Samuel's story of the adoption, Nettie learns that Alphonso is her and Celie's stepfather. Their biological father was lynched, and their mother then suffered a mental collapse that Alphonso exploited. Nettie confesses to Samuel and Corrine that she is the children's biological aunt. Corrine, gravely ill, refuses to believe Nettie until Nettie reminds her that she had previously met Celie. Later, Corrine dies, having accepted Nettie's story.

Celie visits Alphonso, who confirms Nettie's story. Celie confides to Shug that she is losing faith in God; Shug explains to Celie her own unique religious philosophy. Celie, Shug and Squeak decide to leave town; Celie curses Mister before leaving him. They settle in Memphis, Tennessee; Celie starts a pants-making business.

Alphonso dies. Celie inherits land that rightfully should have been passed down to her and Nettie because it belonged to her biological father and mother. She moves back into her childhood home. Celie is crushed when Shug asks her for 6 months to travel with a 19-year old boy, Germaine. Shug reassures Celie that she still loves her, stating her intention to come back and spend the rest of her life with her; however, Celie struggles to believe that. Shug travels with Germaine, writing postcards to Celie. Celie pledges to love Shug even if Shug does not love her back. Celie learns that Mister is suffering from a considerable decline in fortunes, and begins calling him by his first name, Albert. Mister proposes that they marry "in the spirit as well as in the flesh", but Celie declines.

Nettie and Samuel marry and prepare to return to America. Before they leave, Adam marries Tashi, an African girl. Following tradition, Tashi undergoes female genital mutilation and facial scarring. In solidarity, Adam undergoes the same facial scarring ritual.

As Celie realizes that she is content without Shug, Shug returns, having ended her relationship with Germaine. Nettie, Samuel, Olivia, Adam and Tashi arrive at Celie's house. Nettie and Celie reunite after 30 years, introducing one another to their respective families.

== Critical reception ==
The Color Purple won the Pulitzer Prize for Fiction in 1983, making Walker the first black woman to win for fiction; in 1950 Gwendolyn Brooks had won the Pulitzer Prize for poetry. Walker also won the National Book Award for Fiction in 1983. Mel Watkins of the New York Times Book Review wrote that it is a "striking and consummately well-written novel", praising its powerful emotional impact and epistolary structure. It was also named a PBS Great American Read Top 100 Pick.

The book received greater scrutiny amidst controversy surrounding the release of the film adaptation in 1985. The controversy centered around the depiction of black men, which some critics saw as feeding stereotypical narratives of black male violence, while others found the representation compelling and relatable.

On November 5, 2019, the BBC News listed The Color Purple on its list of the 100 most influential novels.

=== Censorship in the United States ===
Though the novel has garnered critical acclaim, it has also been the subject of controversy. The American Library Association placed it on the list of top hundred banned and challenged books in the United States from 1990 to 1999 (17), 2000 to 2009 (17), and 2010 to 2019 (50), as well as the top ten list for 2007 (6) and 2009 (9). Commonly cited justifications for banning the book include sexual explicitness, explicit language, violence, and homosexuality.

== Adaptations ==
The novel was adapted into a film of the same name in 1985. Directed by Steven Spielberg, it stars Whoopi Goldberg as Celie, Danny Glover as Albert, and Oprah Winfrey as Sofia. Though nominated for eleven Academy Awards, it won none. This perceived snubbing ignited controversy because many critics, including Roger Ebert, considered it the best picture of the year.

On December 1, 2005, a musical adaptation of the novel and film with lyrics and music by Stephen Bray, Brenda Russell and Allee Willis, and book by Marsha Norman opened at The Broadway Theatre in New York City. The show was produced by Scott Sanders, Quincy Jones, Harvey Weinstein, and Oprah Winfrey, who was also an investor.

In 2008, BBC Radio 4 broadcast a radio adaptation of the novel in ten 15-minute episodes as a Woman's Hour serial with Nadine Marshall as Celie, Nikki Amuka-Bird, Nina Sosanya and Eamonn Walker. The script was by Patricia Cumper and in 2009 the production received the Sony Radio Academy Awards Silver Drama Award.

In 2018, Warner Bros. announced that they would be releasing a new film adaptation of The Color Purple, based on the musical. Spielberg and Quincy Jones returned to produce this version, along with the stage musical's producers Scott Sanders and Oprah Winfrey. The film opened on December 25, 2023.

== Boycotting Israel ==
As part of the Boycott, Divestment and Sanctions movement (BDS), the author declined publication of the book in Israel in 2012. In a letter to Yediot Books, Walker stated that she would not allow her book to be published in Israel while the country maintained its system of apartheid.

This decision was criticized by the pro-Israel former Harvard Law Professor Alan Dershowitz, who argued that Walker "resorted to bigotry and censorship against Hebrew-speaking readers of her writings".

== Editions ==
- ISBN 0-15-119153-0 (first edition, 1982)
- ISBN 0-606-00587-0 (prebound, 1985)
- ISBN 0-671-45853-1 (paperback, June,1983)
- ISBN 0-671-61702-8 (mass market paperback, 1985)
- ISBN 0-671-64745-8 (mass market paperback, 1987)
- ISBN 0-671-66878-1 (paperback, 1988)
- ISBN 0-15-119154-9 (hardcover, 1992, Anniversary Edition)
- ISBN 1-56849-628-1 (library binding, 1995, reprint)
- ISBN 0-671-01907-4 (paperback, 1998)
- ISBN 0-7641-2064-6 (paperback, 2002)
- ISBN 0-15-602835-2 (paperback, 2003)
- ISBN 0-671-72779-6
- ISBN 0-7043-3905-6
- ISBN 978-0-7538-1892-3 (paperback, United Kingdom, 2004)
- ISBN 9781453223970 (ebook, 2011)
- ISBN 9781780228716 (Tenth Anniversary Edition 2014)
- ISBN 978-1-4746-0725-4 (paperback, United Kingdom, 2017)

== See also ==
- Feminist literature
- Black feminism
- African-American literature
