= Charlie and the Chocolate Factory =

1964 children's novel by Roald Dahl

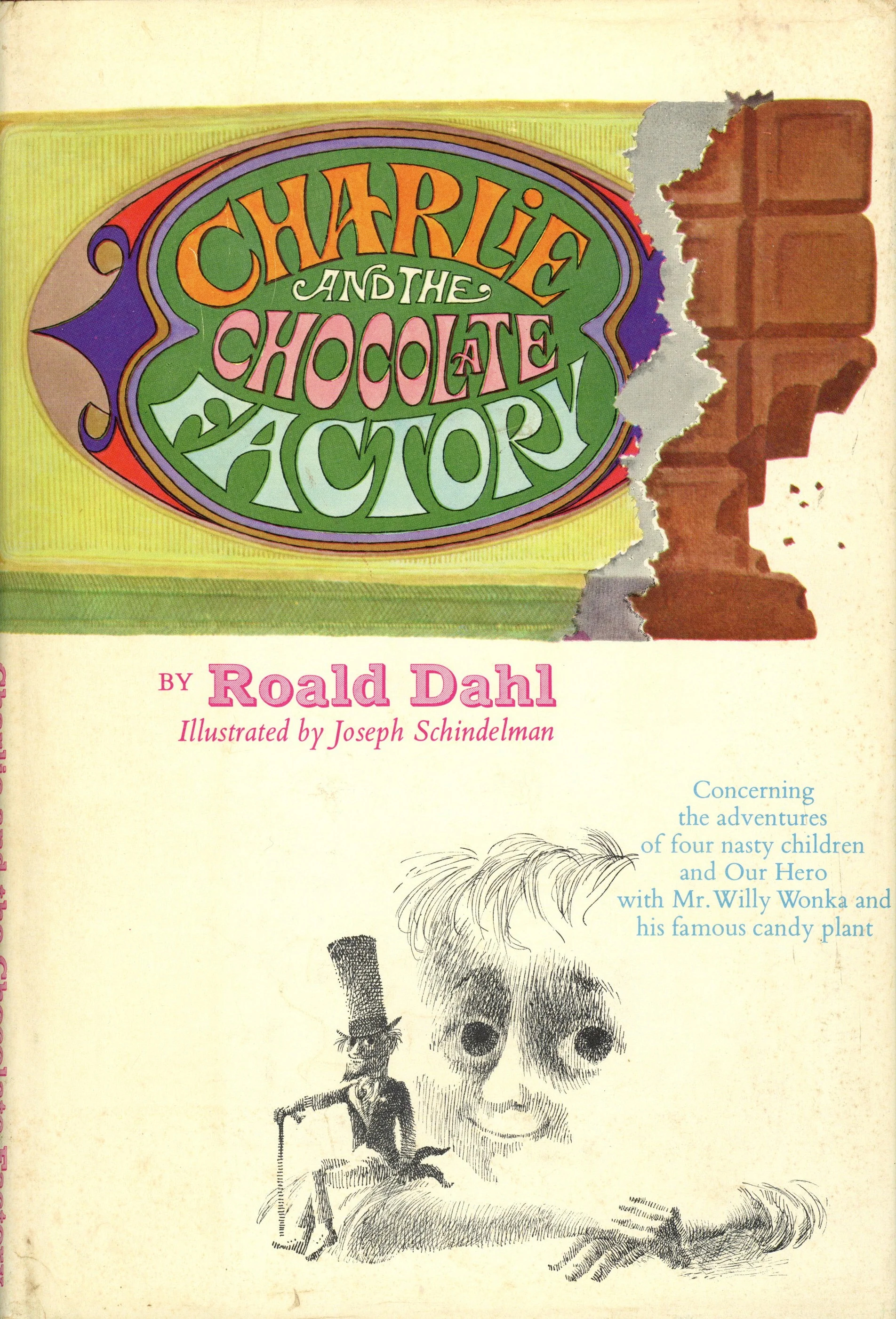
- First US edition
- Author: Roald Dahl
- Illustrators: Joseph Schindelman (first and revised US editions); Faith Jaques (first UK edition); Michael Foreman (1985 edition); Quentin Blake (1995 edition)
- Language: English
- Genre: Children's fantasy novel
- Publisher: George Allen & Unwin (original); Puffin Books (1995–2006); Scholastic (current)
- Publication date: 17 January 1964 (US version); 23 November 1964 (UK version)
- Publication place: United Kingdom
- Pages: 192
- OCLC: 9318922
- Followed by: Charlie and the Great Glass Elevator

Charlie and the Chocolate Factory is a 1964 children's novel by the British writer Roald Dahl. It follows young Charlie Bucket inside the chocolate factory of an eccentric chocolatier named Willy Wonka.

The story was originally inspired by Dahl's experience of chocolate companies during his schooldays at Repton School in Derbyshire. Cadbury would often send test packages to the schoolchildren in exchange for their opinions on the new products. At that time (around the 1920s), Cadbury and Rowntree's were England's two largest chocolate makers and they each often tried to steal trade secrets by sending spies, posing as employees, into the other's factory—inspiring Dahl's idea for the recipe-thieving spies (such as Wonka's rival Slugworth) depicted in the book. Because of this, both companies became highly protective of their chocolate-making processes. It was a combination of this secrecy and the elaborate, often gigantic, machines in the factory that inspired Dahl to write the story.

Charlie and the Chocolate Factory is frequently ranked among the most popular works in children's literature. In 2012 Charlie Bucket brandishing a Golden Ticket appeared on a Royal Mail first-class stamp in the UK. The novel was first published in the US by Alfred A. Knopf, Inc. in 1964 and in the UK by George Allen & Unwin 11 months later. The book's sequel, Charlie and the Great Glass Elevator, was published in 1972. Dahl planned a third installment in the series, but never finished it.

The book has been adapted into two major motion pictures: Willy Wonka & the Chocolate Factory (1971) and Charlie and the Chocolate Factory (2005). A standalone film exploring Willy Wonka's origins, simply titled Wonka, was released in 2023. The book has spawned a media franchise with multiple video games, theatrical productions and merchandise.

== Plot ==
Charlie Bucket is a kind and loving boy who lives in poverty with his parents and grandparents in a town which is home to the world-famous Wonka's Chocolate Factory. One day, Charlie's bedridden Grandpa Joe tells him about Willy Wonka, the factory's eccentric owner, and all of his fantastical candies. Rival chocolatiers sent in spies to steal Wonka's recipes, forcing him to close the factory and disappear. Wonka reopened the factory a few years later, but the gates remain locked, and nobody knows who is providing the factory with its workforce as no one is ever seen going in or coming out.

The next day, the newspaper announces that Wonka has hidden five Golden Tickets in Wonka Bars; the finders of these tickets will be invited to a tour of the factory and receive a lifetime supply of chocolate. The first four tickets are found by gourmand Augustus Gloop, spoilt brat Veruca Salt, consistent gum-chewer Violet Beauregarde, and TV addict Mike Teavee.

During the mad rush to find the Golden Tickets, Charlie's attempts to find one fail: on the first try, on Charlie's birthday, his parents give him a Wonka bar (his usual birthday present) that turns out nothing; on the second try, with encouragement from Grandpa Joe, Charlie buys another Wonka bar using some of Grandpa Joe's secret savings, but that too yields no ticket. The family’s poverty then deepens when Charlie’s father loses his job at a toothpaste factory that closes, but Charlie manages to buy two Wonka Bars with money he finds in the snow. When he opens the second bar, Charlie discovers that it contains the fifth and final ticket. Upon hearing the news, Grandpa Joe suddenly regains his mobility and volunteers to accompany Charlie to the factory.

On the day of the tour, which is the very next day, Wonka welcomes the five children and their guardians inside the factory, a wonderland of confectionery creations that defy explanation. They also meet the Oompa-Loompas, a race of impish humanoids who help him operate the factory after rescuing them from a land of dangerous monsters and providing them with cocoa beans.

During the tour, the four other children give in to their respective impulses and are ejected from the factory in darkly comical ways: Augustus falls into the Chocolate River and is sucked up by a pipe, Violet is turned into a giant blueberry after chewing an experimental stick of three-course dinner gum ending with a blueberry pie flavour, Veruca and her parents fall down a rubbish chute after she tries to capture one of the nut-testing squirrels as a pet, and Mike is shrunk after misusing a machine that sends chocolate by television — all despite Wonka's warnings. The Oompa-Loompas sing about the children's misbehaviour and ejections each time disaster strikes.

With only Charlie remaining, Wonka congratulates him for "winning" the factory. Wonka explains that the whole tour was secretly designed to help him find a worthy heir to his business, and Charlie was the only child whose innocence and good nature passed the test. They ride the Great Glass Elevator and watch Augustus, Violet, Veruca, Mike and all their parents leave the factory by boarding trucks loaded to the brim with Wonka products (as promised in the Golden Tickets) before flying to Charlie's house, where Wonka invites the entire Bucket family to come and live with him inside his factory.

== Publication ==
=== Race, editing, and censorship ===
Dahl's widow said that Charlie was originally written as "a little Black boy." Dahl's biographer said the change to a white character was driven by Dahl's agent, who thought "a black Charlie would not appeal to readers."

In the first published edition, the Oompa-Loompas were described as African pygmies, and were drawn this way in the original printed edition. After the announcement of a film adaptation sparked a statement from the American group NAACP, which expressed concern that the transportation of Oompa-Loompas to Wonka's factory resembled slavery, Dahl found himself sympathising with their concerns and published a revised edition. In this edition, as well as the subsequent sequel, the Oompa-Loompas were drawn as being white and appearing similar to hippies, and the references to Africa were deleted.

In 2023 the publisher Puffin made more than eighty additional changes to the original text of the book, such as removing every occurrence of the word fat (including referring to Augustus Gloop as "enormous" rather than "enormously fat" and greatly changing the words of his song); removing most references to the Oompa-Loompas' diminutive size and physical appearance and omitting descriptions of them living in trees and wearing deerskins and leaves; removing or changing the words mad, crazy and queer; omitting many references to Mike Teavee's toy guns; and removing references to corporal punishment (such as changing "She needs a really good spanking" to "She needs a really good talking to" and "She wants a good kick in the pants" to "She needs to learn some manners").

1964 text	1973 revised text	2023 text
'If he's perfectly safe, then where is he?' snapped Mrs Gloop. 'Lead me to him this instant!' Mr Wonka turned around and clicked his fingers sharply, click, click, click, three times. Immediately, an Oompa-Loompa appeared, as if from nowhere, and stood beside him. The Oompa-Loompa bowed and smiled, showing beautiful white teeth. His skin was almost pure black, and the top of his fuzzy head came just above the height of Mr Wonka's knee. He wore the usual deerskin slung over his shoulder. 'Now listen to me,' said Mr Wonka, looking down at the tiny man.	'If he's perfectly safe, then where is he?' snapped Mrs Gloop. 'Lead me to him this instant!' Mr Wonka turned around and clicked his fingers sharply, click, click, click, three times. Immediately, an Oompa-Loompa appeared, as if from nowhere, and stood beside him. The Oompa-Loompa bowed and smiled, showing beautiful white teeth. His skin was rosy-white, his hair was golden brown, and the top of his head came just above the height of Mr Wonka's knee. He wore the usual deerskin slung over his shoulder. 'Now listen to me,' said Mr Wonka, looking down at the tiny man.	'If he's perfectly safe, then where is he?' snapped Mrs Gloop. 'Lead me to him this instant!' An Oompa-Loompa appeared, as if from nowhere, and stood beside him. 'Now listen to me,' said Mr Wonka, looking down at the man.

=== Unused chapters ===
Various unused and draft material from Dahl's early versions of the novel have been found. In the initial, unpublished drafts of Charlie and the Chocolate Factory, nine golden tickets were distributed to tour Willy Wonka's secret chocolate factory and the children faced more rooms and more temptations to test their self-control. Some of the names of the children cut from the final work include:

- Clarence Crump, Bertie Upside and Terence Roper (who overindulge in Warming Candies)
- Elvira Entwhistle (lost down a rubbish chute, renamed Veruca Salt)
- Violet Glockenberry (renamed Strabismus and finally Beauregarde)
- Miranda Grope and Augustus Pottle (lost up a chocolate pipe, combined into the character Augustus Gloop)
- Miranda Mary Piker (renamed from Miranda Grope, became the subject of Spotty Powder)
- Marvin Prune (a conceited boy involved in The Children's-Delight Room)
- Wilbur Rice and Tommy Troutbeck, the subjects of The Vanilla Fudge Room
- Herpes Trout (renamed Mike Teavee)

==== "Spotty Powder" ====
"Spotty Powder" was first published as a short story in 1973. In 1998, it was included in the children's horror anthology Scary! Stories That Will Make You Scream edited by Peter Haining. The brief note before the story described the story as having been left out of Charlie and the Chocolate Factory due to an already brimming number of misbehaving children characters in the tale. In 2005, The Times reprinted "Spotty Powder" as a "lost" chapter, saying that it had been found in Dahl's desk, written backwards in mirror writing (the same way that Leonardo da Vinci wrote in his journals). Spotty Powder looks and tastes like sugar, but causes bright red pox-like spots to appear on faces and necks five seconds after ingestion, so children who eat Spotty Powder do not have to go to school. The spots fade on their own a few hours later. After learning the purpose of Spotty Powder, the humourless, smug Miranda Piker and her equally humourless father (a schoolmaster) are enraged and disappear into the Spotty Powder room to sabotage the machine. Soon after entering, they are heard making what Mrs. Piker interprets as screams. Mr. Wonka assures her (after making a brief joke where he claims that headmasters are one of the occasional ingredients) that it is only laughter. Exactly what happens to them is not revealed in the extract.

In an early draft, sometime after being renamed from Miranda Grope to Miranda Piker, but before "Spotty Powder" was written, she falls down the chocolate waterfall and ends up in the Peanut-Brittle Mixer. This results in the "rude and disobedient little kid" becoming "quite delicious." This early draft poem was slightly rewritten as an Oompa-Loompa song in the lost chapter, which now puts her in the "Spotty-Powder mixer" and instead of being "crunchy and ... good [peanut brittle]" she is now "useful [for truancy] and ... good."

==== "The Vanilla Fudge Room" ====
In 2014 The Guardian revealed that Dahl had removed another chapter ("The Vanilla Fudge Room") from an early draft of the book. The Guardian reported the now-eliminated passage was "deemed too wild, subversive and insufficiently moral for the tender minds of British children almost fifty years ago." In what was originally chapter five in that version of the book, Charlie goes to the factory with his mother instead of Grandpa Joe as originally published. At this point, the chocolate factory tour is down to eight children, including Tommy Troutbeck and Wilbur Rice. After the entire group climbs to the top of the titular fudge mountain, eating vanilla fudge along the way, Troutbeck and Rice decide to take a ride on the wagons carrying away chunks of fudge. The wagons take them directly to the Pounding And Cutting Room, where the fudge is reformed and sliced into small squares for retail sale. Wonka states the machine is equipped with "a large wire strainer ... which is used specially for catching children before they fall into the machine" adding that "It always catches them. At least it always has up to now."

The chapter dates back to an early draft with ten golden tickets, including one each for Miranda Grope and Augustus Pottle, who fell into the chocolate river prior to the events of "Fudge Mountain". Augustus Pottle was routed to the Chocolate Fudge Room, not the Vanilla Fudge Room explored in this chapter, and Miranda Grope ended up in the Fruit and Nuts Room.

==== "The Warming Candy Room" ====
Also in 2014, Vanity Fair published a plot summary of "The Warming Candy Room", wherein three boys eat too many "warming candies" and end up "bursting with heat."

The Warming Candy Room is dominated by a boiler, which heats a scarlet liquid. The liquid is dispensed one drop at a time, where it cools and forms a hard shell, storing the heat and "by a magic process ... the hot heat changes into an amazing thing called 'cold heat.'" After eating a single warming candy, one could stand naked in the snow comfortably. This meets predictable disbelief from Clarence Crump, Bertie Upside and Terence Roper, who proceed to eat at least 100 warming candies each, resulting in profuse perspiration. The three boys and their families discontinue the tour after they are taken to cool off "in the large refrigerator for a few hours."

==== "The Children's-Delight Room" ====
Dahl originally planned for a child called Marvin Prune to be included. He submitted the excised chapter regarding Prune to The Horn Book Review in the early 1970s. Rather than publish the chapter, Horn Book responded with a critical essay by the children's author Eleanor Cameron, who called Charlie and the Chocolate Factory "one of the most tasteless books ever written for children".

== Themes and analysis ==
Charlie and the Chocolate Factory has often been discussed as a fantasy about appetite, poverty, self-control and reward. The novel contrasts the severe scarcity of Charlie Bucket's household with the spectacular abundance of Wonka's factory. This contrast frames Charlie's patience, family loyalty and restraint as virtues, while the other Golden Ticket winners are associated with excessive desire: Augustus Gloop with gluttony, Veruca Salt with entitlement, Violet Beauregarde with competitive consumption, and Mike Teavee with television-mediated appetite.

The factory tour has also been interpreted as a sequence of moral tests. Wan Syakira Meor Hissan, applying John C. Gibbs's model of mature and immature morality, argues that the child characters illustrate different forms of moral reasoning. In this reading, Charlie is associated with responsibility, kindness, honesty and respect for his family, whereas Augustus and Veruca are used to illustrate immature or impulsive behaviour that is corrected through punishment. The recurring pattern of warning, disobedience, punishment and Oompa-Loompa commentary gives the book the form of a comic cautionary tale.

Critics have disagreed over whether the punishments are liberatingly comic or unnecessarily cruel. Margaret Talbot notes that Dahl's fiction often gives children grotesque revenge fantasies and that, in Charlie and the Chocolate Factory, unpleasant children receive exaggerated comeuppances: Augustus is forced through the chocolate works, Violet becomes a giant blueberry, Mike is miniaturised and Veruca is sent down a rubbish chute. Talbot also observes that adult objections to Dahl often focused less on his prose than on the "unsentimental" and "slightly sadistic" tone of his children's fiction.

The novel's sweets have been read in two different ways. For some critics, candy in Dahl's work is not merely a symbol of instant gratification but a source of invention, fantasy and verbal play. Talbot argues that Dahl turns confectionery into an imaginative springboard, encouraging children to invent impossible sweets and pleasures of their own. Other readings emphasise the novel's relationship with consumer culture. Tuğba Çelik Korat's ecological analysis argues that the novel reproduces, rather than simply criticises, the values of consumer society; in this interpretation, Wonka embodies capitalist power, creates social dependencies through his products and presides over a factory built on the labour and othering of the Oompa-Loompas.

This ambiguity also shapes readings of Willy Wonka. He appears as a magical inventor who rewards Charlie with escape from poverty, but he is also a controlling judge who has designed the tour as a test and who treats the other children as examples of failed behaviour. The factory therefore functions both as a wonderland of abundance and as a disciplinary space in which appetite, disobedience and excess are publicly exposed.

== Reception ==
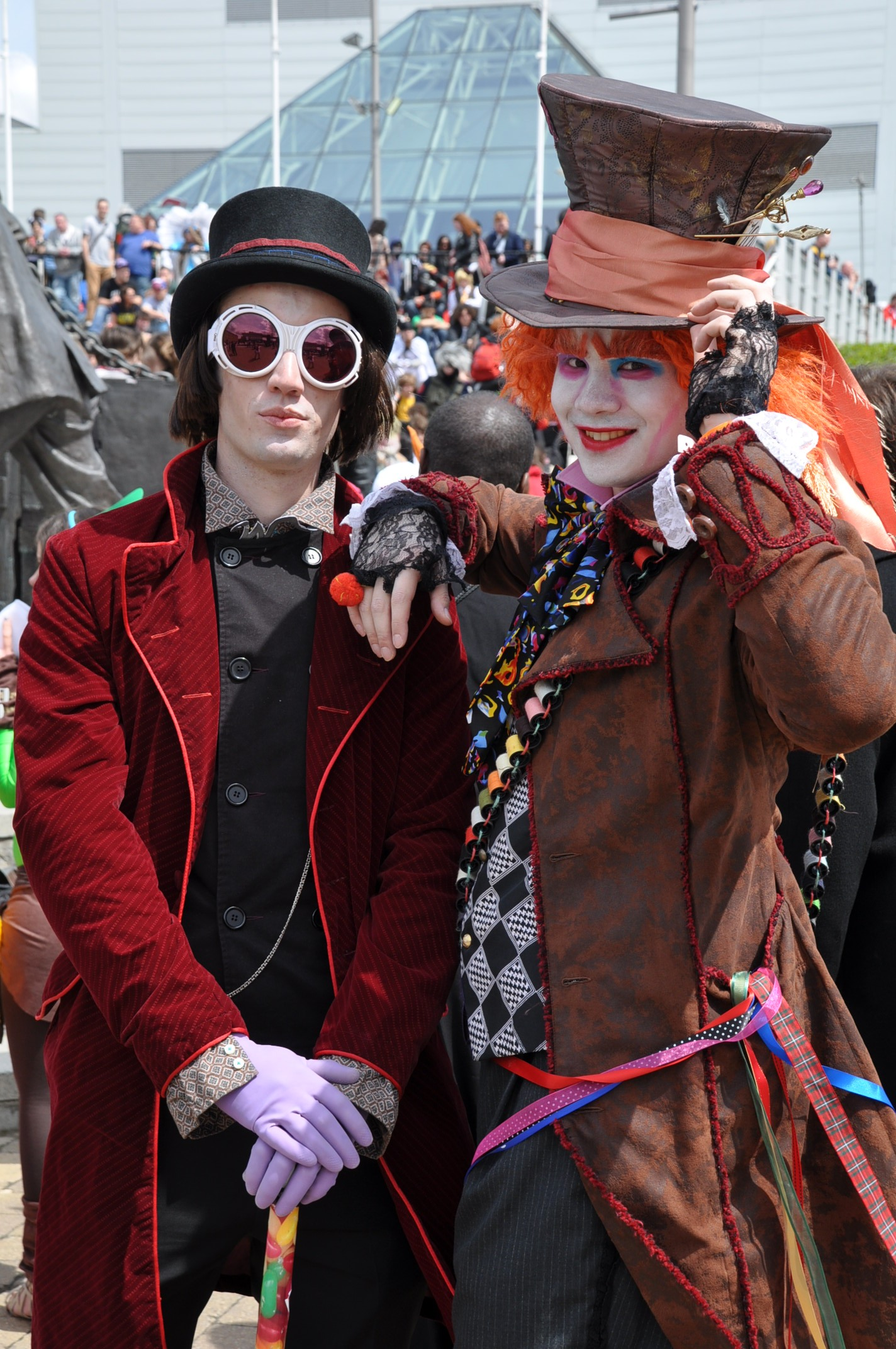
Costumes of Willy Wonka (from Roald Dahl's Charlie and the Chocolate Factory), and the Hatter (from Lewis Carroll's Alice's Adventures in Wonderland) in London. A 2015 UK poll ranked them the top two children's books.

In a 2006 list for the Royal Society of Literature, the author J. K. Rowling named Charlie and the Chocolate Factory among her top ten books that every child should read. A fan of the book since childhood, the film director Tim Burton wrote: "I responded to Charlie and the Chocolate Factory because it respected the fact that children can be adults."

A 2004 study found that it was a common read-aloud book for fourth-grade pupils in schools in San Diego County, California, US. A 2012 survey by the University of Worcester determined that it was one of the most common books that UK adults had read as children, after Alice's Adventures in Wonderland, The Lion, the Witch and the Wardrobe and The Wind in the Willows.

Groups who have praised the book include:

- New England Round Table of Children's Librarians Award (US, 1972)
- Surrey School Award (UK, 1973)
- Read Aloud BILBY Award (Australia, 1992)
- Millennium Children's Book Award (UK, 2000)
- The Big Read, ranked number 35 in a BBC survey of the British public to identify the "Nation's Best-loved Novel" (UK, 2003)
- National Education Association, listed as one of "Teachers' Top 100 Books for Children" based on a poll (US, 2007)
- School Library Journal, ranked 61 among all-time children's novels (US, 2012)

In the 2012 survey published by SLJ, a monthly with primarily US audience, Charlie was the second of four books by Dahl among their Top 100 Chapter Books, one more than any other writer. Time magazine in the US included the novel in its list of the 100 Best Young-Adult Books of All Time; it was one of three Dahl novels on the list, more than any other author. In 2016 the novel topped the list of Amazon's best-selling children's books by Dahl in Print and on Kindle. In 2023 the novel was ranked by BBC at no. 18 in their poll of "The 100 greatest children's books of all time".

Although the book has always been popular and considered a children's classic by many literary critics, a number of prominent individuals have spoken unfavourably of the novel over the years. The children's novelist and literary historian John Rowe Townsend has described the book as "fantasy of an almost literally nauseating kind" and accused it of "astonishing insensitivity" regarding the original portrayal of the Oompa-Loompas as Black African Pygmies, although Dahl did revise this in later editions. Another novelist, Eleanor Cameron, compared the book to the sweets that form its subject matter, commenting that it is "delectable and soothing while we are undergoing the brief sensory pleasure it affords but leaves us poorly nourished with our taste dulled for better fare." Ursula K. Le Guin wrote in support of this assessment in a letter to The Horn Book Review, saying that her own daughter would turn "quite nasty" upon finishing the book. Dahl responded to Cameron's criticisms by noting that the classics that she had cited would not be well received by contemporary children.

== Adaptations ==
Charlie and the Chocolate Factory has frequently been adapted for other media, including games, radio, the screen, and stage, most often as plays or musicals for children – often titled Willy Wonka or Willy Wonka Jr and almost always featuring musical numbers by all the main characters (Wonka, Charlie, Grandpa Joe, Violet, Veruca, etc.); many of the songs are revised versions from the 1971 film.

=== Film ===
The book was first made into a feature film as a musical, titled Willy Wonka & the Chocolate Factory (1971), directed by Mel Stuart, produced by David L. Wolper, and starring Gene Wilder as Willy Wonka, character actor Jack Albertson as Grandpa Joe, and Peter Ostrum as Charlie Bucket, with music by Leslie Bricusse and Anthony Newley. Dahl was credited for writing the screenplay, but David Seltzer was brought in by Stuart and Wolper to make changes against Dahl's wishes, leaving his original adaptation, in one critic's opinion, "scarcely detectable". Amongst other things, Dahl was unhappy with the foregrounding of Wonka over Charlie, and disliked the musical score. Because of this, Dahl disowned the film. The film had an estimated budget of US$2.9 million but grossed only $4 million and was considered a box-office disappointment, though it received positive reviews from critics. Home video and DVD sales, as well as repeated television airings, resulted in the film subsequently becoming a cult classic. Concurrently with the 1971 film, the Quaker Oats Company introduced a line of sweets whose marketing uses the book's characters and imagery.

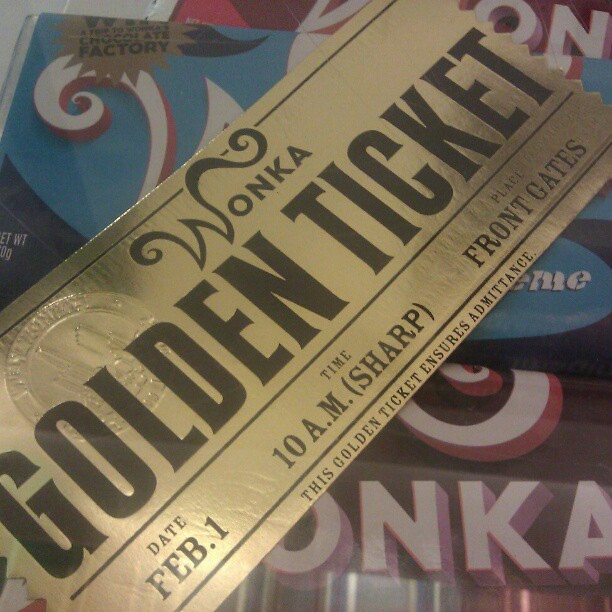
Golden Ticket from the 2005 film Charlie and the Chocolate Factory on display at a convention in Spain

Warner Bros. and the Dahl estate reached an agreement in 1998 to produce another film version of Charlie and the Chocolate Factory, with the Dahl family receiving total artistic control. The project languished in development hell until Tim Burton signed on to direct in 2003. The film, titled Charlie and the Chocolate Factory, stars Johnny Depp as Willy Wonka. It was released in 2005 to positive reviews and massive box office returns, becoming the eighth-highest-grossing film of the year.

In October 2016, Variety reported that Warner Bros. had acquired the rights to the Willy Wonka character from the Roald Dahl Estate and would be planning a new film centred on him with David Heyman producing. In February 2018 Paul King entered final negotiations to direct the film. In May 2021, it was reported that the film would be a musical titled Wonka, with Timothée Chalamet playing a younger version of Wonka in an origin story. King was confirmed as director and co-writer along with the comedian Simon Farnaby; the film was released globally in December 2023.

In April 2026, it was announced that Netflix would release an animated film follow up to the story titled Charlie vs. the Chocolate Factory. The film, co-produced with Sony Pictures Imageworks, sees Wonka released from jail following the events of the original story and returning to his factory, where he faces a group of teenagers attempting to break in to steal a valuable Wonka Bar. The film is directed by Jared Stern and Elaine Bogan, with Taika Waititi voicing Wonka.

On 12 August 2026, Netflix announced a theatrical release date of 5 November 2027, and a streaming release on 22 December 2027. The cast was also revealed to include Nicola Coughlan, Charithra Chandran, Samson Kayo, Christopher Chung, Kate Winslet, and Helena Bonham Carter, alongside the previously announced Kit Connor as Charlie Paley and Taika Waititi.

=== Animated series ===
On 27 November 2018, Netflix and The Roald Dahl Story Company jointly announced that Netflix would be producing an animated series based on Dahl's books, including Charlie and the Chocolate Factory, Matilda, The BFG, The Twits and other titles. Production commenced on the first of the Netflix Dahl animated series in 2019. On 5 March 2020 Variety announced that Taika Waititi was partnering with Netflix on a pair of animated series – one based on the world of Charlie and the Chocolate Factory and another based on the Oompa-Loompa characters. "The shows will retain the quintessential spirit and tone of the original story while building out the world and characters far beyond the pages of the Dahl book for the very first time," Netflix said.

On 23 February 2022, Mikros Animation revealed that they would be producing a new collaboration with Netflix. The collaboration was announced as Charlie and the Chocolate Factory. The long-format animated event series would be based on the 1964 novel and would be written, directed and executive produced by Waititi.

The Netflix projects later led to the development of the film Charlie vs. The Chocolate Factory.

=== Other adaptations ===
- In 1983, the BBC produced an adaptation for Radio 4. Titled Charlie, it aired in seven episodes between 6 February and 20 March.
- In 1983, a miniseries titled Kalle Och Chokladfabriken was aired on Swedish television. The series consisted of highly detailed static illustrations that were accompanied by an unseen narrator reading an adapted translation of the novel, in a manner similar to the BBC television series Jackanory.
- In 1985, the Charlie and the Chocolate Factory video game was released for the ZX Spectrum by the developer Soft Options and the publisher Hill MacGibbon.
- A loose Russian translation of the "Miss Bigelow" song was adapted as a short cartoon in 1995, part of the Happy Merry-Go-Round series
- A video game, Charlie and the Chocolate Factory, based on Burton's adaptation, was released on 11 July 2005.
- On 1 April 2006, the British theme park Alton Towers opened a family attraction themed around the story. The ride featured a boat section, where guests travel around the chocolate factory in bright pink boats on a chocolate river. In the final stage of the ride, guests enter one of two glass lifts, where they join Willy Wonka as they travel round the factory, eventually shooting up and out through the glass roof. Running for nine years, the ride was closed for good at the end of the 2015 season.
- The Estate of Roald Dahl sanctioned an operatic adaptation called The Golden Ticket. It was written by the American composer Peter Ash and the British librettist Donald Sturrock. The Golden Ticket has completely original music and was commissioned by American Lyric Theater, Lawrence Edelson (producing artistic director) and Felicity Dahl. The opera received its world premiere at the Opera Theatre of Saint Louis on 13 June 2010, in a co-production with American Lyric Theater and Wexford Festival Opera.

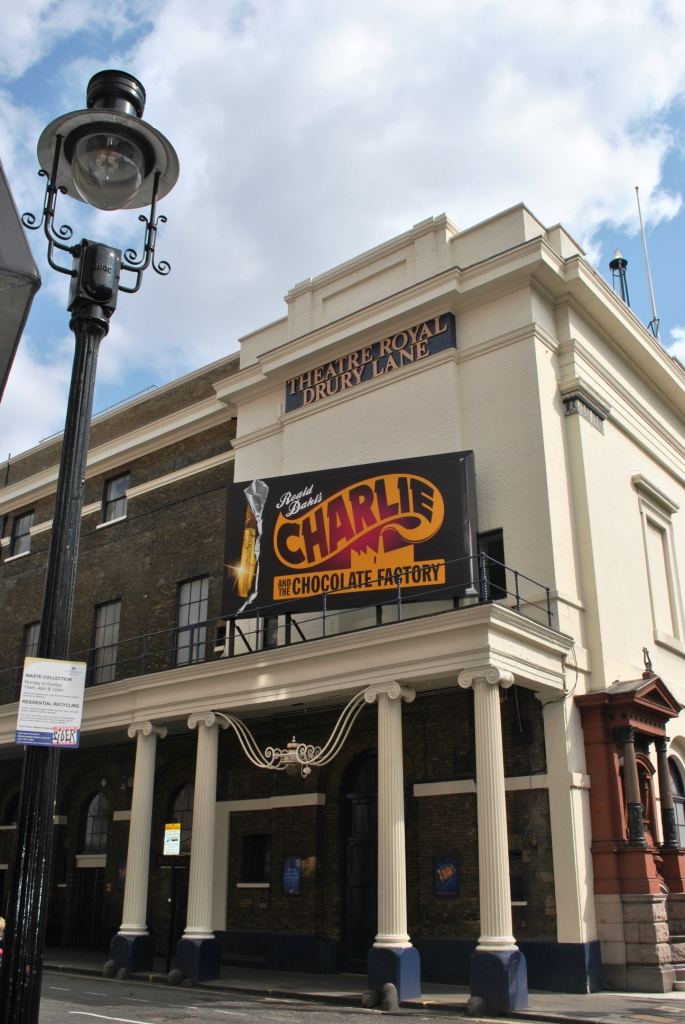
Charlie and the Chocolate Factory musical playing at Drury Lane in the West End of London in 2013

- A musical based on the novel, titled Charlie and the Chocolate Factory, premiered at the West End's Theatre Royal, Drury Lane in May 2013 and officially opened on 25 June. The show was directed by Sam Mendes, with new songs by Marc Shaiman and Scott Wittman, and stars Douglas Hodge as Willy Wonka. The production broke records for weekly ticket sales.
- In July 2017, an animated film Tom and Jerry: Willy Wonka and the Chocolate Factory was released in which the titular cat and mouse were put into the story of the 1971 film.
- In 2021, the Melbourne-based comedians Big Big Big released a six part podcast called The Candyman that satirically presents events at the chocolate factory in a true crime genre.
- An unlicensed attraction, "Willy's Chocolate Experience", opened on 24 February 2024 in Glasgow, and closed within a day. The event was advertised using highly misleading AI-generated artwork, promising features such as "an enchanted garden, an Imagination Lab, a Twilight Tunnel, and captivating entertainment", though instead contained a low-effort mock-up of a chocolate factory in a mostly empty warehouse. The event spawned many internet memes, and featured factory tours offered by several actors playing Willy Wonka, that involved a story in which Wonka would defeat an "evil chocolate maker who lives in the walls" called "The Unknown". According to the actor Paul Connell, who portrayed Willy Wonka in the tours, his script contained "15 pages of AI-generated gibberish". Despite the high entrance fee and promised chocolate theme of the event, guests were only given a single jellybean and a cup of lemonade, and the misleading advertisements led to the police being called to the event shortly prior to it being shut down.
- In September 2026, Netflix released a reality game show called Wonka's The Golden Ticket. The show sees twelve pairs enter the chocolate factory and compete in a series of games. The show will feature the voice of Gene Wilder, recreated with AI with the blessing of his wife.

== Audiobook ==
The book has been recorded a number of times:

- Dahl himself narrated an abridged version of the book in 1975 for Caedmon Records (TC 1476).
- In 2002 the former Monty Python member Eric Idle narrated the audiobook version of the American Edition of Charlie and the Chocolate Factory on Harper Childrens Audio (ISBN 978-0060852801).
- In 2004 James Bolam narrated an abridged recording of the story for Puffin Audiobooks (ISBN 0-14-086818-6).
- Douglas Hodge, who played Willy Wonka in the London production of the stage musical, narrated the UK Edition of the audiobook for Penguin Audio in 2013 (ISBN 978-0141370293), and the title was later released on Audible.

== Editions ==
Charlie and the Chocolate Factory has undergone numerous editions and been illustrated by numerous artists.

=== Books ===
- 1964, OCLC 9318922 (hardcover, Alfred A. Knopf, Inc., original, first US edition, illustrated by Joseph Schindelman)
- 1967, ISBN 9783125737600 (hardcover, George Allen & Unwin, original, first UK edition, illustrated by Faith Jaques)
- 1973, ISBN 0-394-81011-2 (hardcover, revised Oompa Loompa edition)
- 1976, ISBN 0-87129-220-3 (paperback)
- 1980, ISBN 0-553-15097-9 (paperback, illustrated by Joseph Schindelman)
- 1984, ISBN 0-1403-0599-8 (UK paperback, illustrated by Faith Jaques)
- 1985, ISBN 0-14-031824-0 (paperback, illustrated by Michael Foreman)
- 1987, ISBN 1-85089-902-9 (hardcover)
- 1988, ISBN 0-606-04032-3 (prebound)
- 1992, ISBN 0-89966-904-2 (library binding, reprint)
- 1995 (illustrated by Quentin Blake)
- 1998, ISBN 0-14-130115-5 (paperback)
- 2001, ISBN 0-375-81526-0 (hardcover)
- 2001, ISBN 0-14-131130-4 (illustrated by Quentin Blake)
- 2002, ISBN 0-060-51065-X (audio CD read by Eric Idle)
- 2003, ISBN 0-375-91526-5 (library binding)
- 2004, ISBN 0-14-240108-0 (paperback)
- ISBN 0-8488-2241-2 (hardcover)
- 2011, ISBN 978-0-14-310633-3 (paperback), Penguin Classics Deluxe Edition, cover by Ivan Brunetti
- 2014, (hardcover, Penguin UK/Modern Classics, 50th anniversary edition)
- 2014, (hardcover, Penguin UK/Puffin celebratory golden edition, illustrated by Sir Quentin Blake)
- 2014, (double-cover paperback)

=== 50th anniversary cover controversy ===
The cover photo of the 50th anniversary edition, published by Penguin Modern Classics for sale in the UK and aimed at the adult market, received widespread commentary and criticism. The cover is a photo of a heavily made up young girl seated on her mother's knee and wearing a doll-like expression, taken by the photographers Sofia Sanchez and Mauro Mongiello as part of a photo shoot for a French magazine, for a 2008 fashion article titled "Mommie Dearest." In addition to writing that "the image seemingly has little to do with the beloved children's classic", reviewers and commentators in social media (such as posters on the publisher's Facebook page) have said the art evokes Lolita, Valley of the Dolls, and JonBenet Ramsey; looks like a scene from Toddlers & Tiaras; and is "misleading," "creepy," "sexualised," "grotesque," "misjudged on every level," "distasteful and disrespectful to a gifted author and his work," "pretentious," "trashy", "outright inappropriate," "terrifying," "really obnoxious," and "weird & kind of paedophilic."

The publisher explained its objective in a blog post accompanying the announcement about the jacket art: "This new image . . . looks at the children at the center of the story, and highlights the way Roald Dahl's writing manages to embrace both the light and the dark aspects of life." Additionally, Penguin Press's Helen Conford told the Bookseller: "We wanted something that spoke about the other qualities in the book. It's a children's story that also steps outside children's and people aren't used to seeing Dahl in that way." She continued: "[There is] a lot of ill feeling about it, I think because it's such a treasured book and a book which isn't really a 'crossover book'" As she acknowledged: "People want it to remain as a children's book."

The New Yorker describes what it calls this "strangely but tellingly misbegotten" cover design thusly: "The image is a photograph, taken from a French fashion shoot, of a glassy-eyed, heavily made-up little girl. Behind her sits, a mother figure, stiff and coiffed, casting an ominous shadow. The girl, with her long, perfectly waved platinum-blond hair and her pink feather boa, looks like a pretty and inert doll—" The article continues: "And if the Stepford daughter on the cover is meant to remind us of Veruca Salt or Violet Beauregarde, she doesn't: those badly behaved squirts are bubbling over with rude life." Moreover, writes Talbot, "The Modern Classics cover has not a whiff of this validation of childish imagination; instead, it seems to imply a deviant adult audience."
