= Charlie in the White House =

Unfinished novel by Roald Dahl

- Author: Roald Dahl
- Illustrator: N/A
- Language: English
- Series: Charlie Bucket series
- Genre: Children’s literature, Fantasy
- Publisher: N/A
- Publication date: Unpublished (planned after 1972)
- Publication place: United Kingdom
- Media type: Manuscript
- Pages: 1 chapter extant
- Preceded by: Charlie and the Great Glass Elevator

Charlie in the White House is the tentative title of a planned sequel to Charlie and the Great Glass Elevator (1972) by British author Roald Dahl. It was intended to be the third novel in the Charlie Bucket series but was never completed before Dahl's death.

== Background ==
The Charlie Bucket series began with Charlie and the Chocolate Factory (1964), in which Charlie Bucket passes a secret test to become the designated heir to Willy Wonka's chocolate factory and, by extension, his confectionery empire. The sequel, Charlie and the Great Glass Elevator (1972), continues the story with Charlie, his family, and Wonka aboard a flying glass elevator that travels into space before returning to Earth. At the end of The Great Glass Elevator, the U.S. President Lancelot Gilligrass invites Charlie and his companions to the White House to honour their heroism after rescuing a spacecraft, setting up the premise for a subsequent story.

== Manuscript and status ==
Dahl began work on a third Charlie book, provisionally titled Charlie in the White House (sometimes informally referenced by that title in secondary literature) sometime after the second novel's publication. According to accounts from Dahl reference works, he wrote only the first chapter of the manuscript. This chapter is reportedly on display at the Roald Dahl Museum and Story Centre in Great Missenden, Buckinghamshire, England.
