= Faith Jaques =

British children's book author and illustrator

Faith Jaques (1923–1997) was a British illustrator of the late twentieth century notable for her work as a children's book author, illustrator, artist, stamp designer and advocate for artists' rights over their work.

== Early life ==
Faith Heather Jaques was born in Leicester, England, the daughter of Maurice Thompson Jaques and Gladys Millicent Jaques (nee Playford). Her brother Peter Heath Jaques (1919–2013) once represented Leicestershire in first-class cricket. As a child, Jaques was a prodigious reader and artist. She attended Wyggeston Grammar School which she left aged 15 to attend Leicester College of Art from 1941 to 1942 where she studied anatomy, perspective and the histories of architecture, furniture and costume.

== Career ==
=== Early years ===
Jaques joined the Women's Royal Naval Service as soon as she was old enough in order to leave home. She was posted to Oxford where she was stationed in the New Bodleian Library. Her duties included control of a filing department containing over a million photographs, holiday snaps included, of Germany and Occupied Europe, with particular attention given to pictures of coastlines and village approaches. She maintained the organisational skills developed during this period throughout her life, accumulating a large library of reference material. While in Oxford, she took some classes at Oxford School of Art under William Roberts and Bernard Meninsky, and it was then that she decided to become an illustrator. Other illustrators who influenced her were Rex Whistler and Eric Fraser. After she was demobbed in December 1946, Jaques attended the Central School of Arts and Crafts, London, until 1948, supported by an ex-service grant. She lodged in a Salvation Army Hostel for the first six months of the course. Among her tutors and mentors at Central were Edward Ardizzione, Jesse Collins, John Farleigh, Laurence Scarfe and John Minton.

=== Teaching ===
From the late 1940s, she taught at Guildford School of Art (1948–53) and Hornsey College of Art (1960-68) on a part-time basis, while contributing to many magazines and producing other graphic work.

== Children's books ==
Though Jaques had illustrated a variety of material from 1950, she concentrated on illustrating children's books from the mid 1960s, working mainly in black and white. She acknowledged Edward Ardizzone as a significant influence, while demonstrating a closer visual alliance to Lynton Lamb. She illustrated the first British edition of Roald Dahl’s Charlie and the Chocolate Factory published in 1967 following controversy over the depiction of the Oompa-Loompas in the US edition of the book.

In the late 1970s, Jaques illustrated some of Leon Garfield’s London Apprentice series (1976–78), before beginning to write her own children’s books. Comparatively late in her career, she began illustrating in colour including texts that she authored herself. Tilly's House (1979) - the story of a Dutch doll - was her first picture book as author and illustrator.

Heinemann commissioned Faith Jaques to re-illustrate the first four of Alison Uttley’s Grey Rabbit tales, as the plates of the original illustrations by Margaret Tempest (1892-1982) had become too worn to be reprinted.

In 1982, Uttley’s tales also provided the basis for the first of Jaques' series of cut-out picture books, Little Grey Rabbit’s House, while Tales of Little Brown Mouse appeared in 1984.

== Other work ==
Between leaving Central School of Arts and Crafts in 1948 and the 1960s, Jaques' illustrations could be found across a wide spectrum of material:

- British Post Office Stamp and Telegram design. In 1960, Jaques was one of three British artists invited to submit ideas to mark the Conference of European Posts and Telecommunications but she declined to do so. She did however present designs for other British Postage Telegram and Stamps between 1960 and 1978. Her designs were selected for the 1960 Valentine's Day Telegram, the Tercentenary of Establishment of the General Letter Office in 1960, the Seventh Commonwealth Parliamentary Conference in 1961 and three Christmas Stamps in 1978.
- Illustrations for the Radio Times
- Illustrations for BBC Radio's Singing Together
- Illustrations for journals including Strand, Lilliput, World Leader, Our Time, Housewife, House and Garden, Cricket
- Film publicity
- Miscellaneous work including Portmeiron mugs, greetings cards and menus

Jaques was an active advocate for a Public Lending Right and for the recognition of illustrator's work. and was invited to become an honorary member of the Association of Illustrators in 1984.

== Personal life ==
Jaques continued to write and illustrate following her move from London to Bath in 1987. She died on 12 July 1997 aged 74. Jaques' extensive archives are maintained by Seven Stories.

== Selected works ==
=== Writer and illustrator ===
- Drawing in Pen and Ink, (1964)
- Tilly's House, (1979)
- Tilly's Rescue, (1980)
- Kidnap in Willowbank Wood (1982)
- Our Village (1983)
- The Christmas Party (1986)

=== Illustrator only ===
- Nesbit, E., The Railway Children (1960)
- Kamm, Josephine, The story of Mrs. Pankhurst (1961)
- Mathieson, Eric, The true story of Jumbo the elephant (1963)
- Knight, Isobel, Rescue in the snow (1963)
- Treece, Henry, The Windswept City: A Novel of the Trojan War (1967)
- Dahl, Roald, Charlie and the Chocolate Factory (1967)
- Williams, Ursula Moray, Mog, (1969)
- Dickens, Charles, The magic fishbone (1969
- History of Costume (1966–70)
- Nesbit, E., The Island of the nine whirlpools (1970)
- Williams, Ursula Moray, Johnnie Golightly and his crocodile (1970)
- Ransome, Arthur, Old Peter's Russian Tales (1971)
- Crush, Margaret, A first look at costume (1972)
- Bowden, Nina, Carrie's War (1973)
- Dahl, Roald, Charlie and the great glass elevator (1973)
- Pearce, Philippa, What the neighbours did, and other stories (1973)
- Duggan, Maurice, Falter Tom and the water boy (1974)
- Williams, Ursula Moray, Grandpapa's Folly and the woodworm-bookworm : a story (1974)
- Lang, Andrew, Red Fairy Book (1974)
- Harris, John, A Peck of Pepper (1974)
- Cresswell, Helen, Lizzie Dripping again by (1974)
- Nesbit, E., The old nursery stories (1975)
- Garfield, Leon, London Apprentice series (1976–78)
- Uttley, Allison, A Traveller in Time, Puffin, (1977)
- Treece, Henry, The windswept city (1977)
- Avery, Gillian, Mouldy's Orphan (1978 )
- Ahlberg, Allan, Mr Buzz the beeman, Puffin (1981)
- Uttley, Allison, Little Grey Rabbit’s House (1982)
- Uttley, Allison, Tales of Little Brown Mouse (1984)
- Masefield, John, The Box of Delights : when the wolves were running (1984)
- Our Village Shop: an old-fashioned model store with its contents ready to cut out and assemble (1984)
- Hoffman, Mary,The Return of the Antelope (1985)
- Thomson, Pat Good Girl Granny (1987 )
- Ahlberg, Allan, Miss Dose the doctor's daughter (1988)
- Sutherland, Zena, The Orchard Book of Nursery Rhymes (1990)
- Sutherland, Zena, The Little Orchard Book of Nursery Rhymes (1991)
- Dickens, Monica, The great fire (1993)
