= A Kitten for Hitler =

- Screenshot
- Directed by: Ken Russell
- Written by: Ken Russell; Emma Millions
- Produced by: Dan Schreiber
- Starring: Phil Pritchard; Rosey Thewlis; Rusty Goffe
- Edited by: Michael Bradsell
- Release date: 1 June 2007 (UK)
- Running time: 8 minutes 20 seconds
- Country: United Kingdom
- Language: English
- Budget: £10,000 (estimated)

A Kitten for Hitler, also known as Ein Kitten für Hitler, is a 2007 British short film directed by Ken Russell. Russell created it intending to be offensive, which caused casting problems, so he decided to cast an adult with dwarfism instead of a young child for the lead role. Russell thus cast Rusty Goffe, who played an Oompa-Loompa in the 1971 film Willy Wonka and the Chocolate Factory, to play the lead role of Lenny, an American Jewish boy who aims to inspire a change of heart in Hitler.

== Plot ==
In the winter of 1941, a Jewish woman and her young son, Lenny, are watching a newsreel at a Brooklyn movie theater. A reel featuring Adolf Hitler appears on screen, sparking loud disapproval from the audience. Lenny asks his mother why no one likes Hitler, and his mother explains Hitler's atrocities. Lenny wonders aloud what Santa Claus will give him for Christmas, but his mother replies Hitler won't get anything for Christmas.

This prompts Lenny to travel alone to Germany to give Hitler a kitten for Christmas, hoping it will soften Hitler's heart and make him reconsider his actions. Upon Lenny's arrival, he presents the boxed gift to Hitler, who fears it's a bomb, and tosses it to his mistress, Eva Braun. She opens it to discover a kitten, which she gives to Hitler, who is moved to tears. As Hitler embraces his gift, his mood changes when Lenny reveals he has a swastika-shaped birthmark on his stomach, and Hitler notices his star of David necklace. Horrified and infuriated, Hitler has Eva slaughter Lenny, and skin the boy's corpse to fashion a lampshade made of his hide, which they display on their bedside table lamp, using Lenny's necklace as a switch.

Following the war, the lamp is returned to Lenny's mother, who keeps it as part of a shrine honoring Lenny. When her hand makes contact with the surface of the shade, the lamp lights up, and by what appears to be an act of God, the swastika transforms into a Star of David. It is proclaimed to be a miracle, and soon, she, holding the lamp, stands before president Harry S. Truman, who awards the Purple Heart to the lampshade.

== Cast ==
- Rusty Goffe as Lenny, a young Jewish boy living in Brooklyn, New York City
- Phil Pritchard as Adolf Hitler
- Rosey Thewlis as Eva Braun, Hitler's mistress
- Rufus Graham as United States president Harry S. Truman

== Production ==
Following a discussion about film censorship with British broadcaster Melvyn Bragg while they worked on The South Bank Show, Bragg challenged Russell to create a film which Russell himself would want banned. The result was A Kitten for Hitler. After Russell sent Bragg an initial draft, Bragg responded, "Ken, if ever you make this film and it is shown, you will be lynched."

Phil Pritchard portrayed Adolf Hitler. Those auditioning for the part were asked to attend the casting dressed as Hitler, creating a bizarre waiting room scene. Due to the content of the film, Russell couldn't convince any child actor's parents to let their son appear in the film. Russell decided to fill the role of Lenny with an adult with dwarfism. He thus cast Rusty Goffe, who played an Oompa-Loompa in the 1971 film Willy Wonka and the Chocolate Factory. Russell's wife Lisi played Lenny's mother, and his daughter organized the costumes. He shot the entire film in a studio in Shoreditch against a green screen with backgrounds added during post-production. The film premiered on the website Comedybox.tv, after Russell was introduced to Dan Schreiber by screenwriter Emma Millions.

== Reception ==
Ken Russell later described A Kitten for Hitler as his most bizarre and shocking, even more so than his banned 1971 work The Devils, although he also described it as a comedy. Russell told the story of the film to fellow director Quentin Tarantino at a film festival, who reacted favourably. In 2012, it was included in a list of six alternative Christmas films by British newspaper The Guardian.
