= Peter Jaques =

English cricketer

Personal information
- Full name: Peter Heath Jaques
- Born: 20 November 1919; Aylestone, Leicestershire, England
- Died: 4 July 2013 (aged 93); Taunton, Somerset, England
- Batting: Right-handed
- Relatives: Robin Lett (grandson)

Domestic team information
- Years: Team
- 1949: Leicestershire

Career statistics
Competition	First-class
Matches	1
Runs scored	69
Batting average	34.50
100s/50s	–/1
Top score	55
Catches/stumpings	–/–
- Source: Cricinfo, 30 December 2012

Peter Heath Jaques (20 November 1919 − 4 July 2013) was an English cricketer. Jaques was a right-handed batsman. He was born at Aylestone, Leicestershire.

Jaques served in the British Army during World War II, obtaining the rank of second lieutenant on 14 January 1944 and being given the service number of 307125. He relinquished his commission from the Royal Regiment of Artillery in October 1944 on account of ill health. However, this was cancelled the following month, but the relinquishing of his commission was reinstated again later in that month. Following the war, Jaques made a single first-class appearance for Leicestershire against Northamptonshire at the County Ground, Northampton in 1949. Batting at number six in Leicestershire's first-innings, he made 55 runs before he was dismissed by Des Barrick. In their second-innings, he was dismissed by the same bowler for 14 runs. This was his only major appearance for the county.

His grandson, Robin Lett, has also played first-class cricket, while his sister, Faith Jaques, was a children's book author and illustrator.
