= Oversewn binding =

Type of bookbinding

Oversewn bindings are a type of bookbinding produced by sewing together loose leaves of paper to form a text block. Threads pass through small holes that have been punched in the signature's gutter margin (nearest the spine), forming overlock stitches that attach it to previously attached sections. This method of stitching is sometimes called stab sewing. A piece of linen is then glued to the text block spine for further support. The book's spine may be rounded and backed to keep it from caving in, but if the text block is too thick, the spine is sometimes left flat. A strip of cloth called a super is then often affixed to the spine of the text block and then to the boards of the case. Oversewing can be done by hand but is usually done with a machine in a bindery.

Oversewing was frequently used as a rebinding technique for libraries. In this case, the book's spine must be separated from the text block. Usually this requires removing a small section of the leaves' inside margin as well. It is a very strong, durable binding technique, but has lost popularity since the 1980s due to some characteristics librarians perceive as drawbacks.

== History ==
Cedric Chivers patented hand oversewing in 1904. He emphasized its efficiency and pointed out that technicians could do the work previously entrusted only to trained binders. Chivers opened operations in Bath, England and New York City, and by 1908 his American operation had served up to five hundred libraries in the United States. He was a skilled salesman, but historians suggest Chivers was overly focused on financial gain to the disregard of standards and specifications like the Committee on Leather for Bookbinding.

In 1920, W. Elmo Reavis, a bookbinder from Los Angeles, invented an oversewing machine, and began selling it to American libraries. The mechanization of the process Chivers patented led to oversewing - now mass-produced, assembly line work - becoming even more popular. By the 1930s, oversewing was part of standard library binding specifications.

== Drawbacks ==
In 1967, Matt Roberts, chief of the circulation department of the Washington University Libraries, first documented the drawbacks of oversewn bindings. It is especially threatening to books with acidic paper; the tight sewing in the gutter margin may cause shards of this paper, in its weakened, embrittled state, to tear and flake off. Oversewn bindings are also often very tightly bound, so it is difficult for books' spines to open fully and lie flat. From a conservation standpoint, a primary concern about oversewing is that it is essentially irreversible. In order for an oversewn text block to be re-bound again, more of the inside margin has to be cut or ground off. Some librarians believe that it is a hasty practice which favors cost over artifactual value, as original bindings may potentially be restorable.

By 1986, most librarians and conservators had agreed that the threats of oversewn bindings out-weighed their benefits. Now various types of adhesive bindings, especially double-fan adhesive, are favored by library binders.

Even Cedric Chivers admitted, in 1925,

These methods were the best which at that time could be contrived, but presently complaints began to be made as to the durability of some of my bindings. Pages broke away from the sewing . . . Indeed I [now] frequently lose contracts for Library binding because of my refusal to follow the instructions of a specification which under other conditions I personally drew up.
