= Charlie and the Great Glass Elevator =

1972 book by Roald Dahl

- Original book cover of Charlie and the Great Glass Elevator with illustrations by Joseph Schindelman
- Author: Roald Dahl
- Illustrator: Joseph Schindelman (1st U.S. edition); Faith Jaques (1st UK edition); Michael Foreman (2nd edition); Quentin Blake (3rd edition)
- Language: English
- Genre: Science fantasy Children's novel
- Publisher: Alfred A. Knopf
- Publication date: 1972
- Publication place: United Kingdom
- Media type: Print (Hardback & Paperback)
- Pages: 202
- ISBN: 0-394-82472-5 (first edition, hardback)
- OCLC: 314239
- LC Class: PZ7.D1515 Ck3
- Preceded by: Charlie and the Chocolate Factory

Charlie and the Great Glass Elevator is a children's book by British author Roald Dahl. It is the sequel to Charlie and the Chocolate Factory (1964), continuing the story of young Charlie Bucket and a chocolatier, Willy Wonka, as they travel in the Great Glass Elevator. The book was published in the United States by Alfred A. Knopf, Inc. in 1972, a year after the release of the film Willy Wonka and the Chocolate Factory, and in the United Kingdom by George Allen & Unwin in 1973.

It was adapted for audio by Puffin Audio Books starring Neil Answych as Charlie Bucket and Gordan Fairclough as Willy Wonka, and the second half of a BBC adaptation for Radio 4 in 1983. It was also adapted as a stage play. The Great Glass Elevator had a mixed reception and was deemed significantly inferior to its predecessor; it has never been adapted to film.

== Plot ==
Charlie Bucket and his family board the flying Great Glass Elevator to return to Willy Wonka's chocolate factory with Charlie as Wonka's heir. As Wonka races the elevator upward so that he can drive it back down through the factory roof, a distraction causes him to overshoot his mark and enter orbit. The elevator approaches the newly constructed American space hotel and docks at it.

US government officials are alarmed by the intrusion and notify the scatterbrained President Gilligrass, who accuses the group of being foreign enemies. Wonka poses as an alien and sings gibberish until he is interrupted by the arrival of Vermicious Knids, dangerous shape-shifting aliens that have infested the hotel. The group escape back into the elevator and disembark with a Knid in pursuit. The Knid rams the elevator but merely gets a bruise.

Once they leave, the president allows a commuter capsule carrying astronauts and hotel staff to dock with the hotel. Several passengers are devoured by Knids before the rest can evacuate. The Knids attack the fleeing capsule and disable it. The elevator, having circled around the Earth, braves the swarm of Knids and tows the damaged capsule out of danger. The Knids make a final attempt to retrieve the capsule before burning up in the atmosphere. Wonka releases the capsule and then crashes the elevator into his factory. Upon landing, Wonka is greeted warmly by the Oompa-Loompas who were concerned about his prolonged absence.

Charlie's three bedridden grandparents George, Georgina, and Josephine refuse to get up and see the factory. Wonka offers them rejuvenation pills called "Wonka-Vite", but they overdose resulting in George and Josephine becoming babies and Georgina vanishing, having become –2 years old. Charlie and Wonka ride the Elevator to "Minusland" to find her and Wonka sprays her with the opposite of Wonka-Vite – "Vita-Wonk" – to age her again. Upon returning, they discover that Georgina is now 358 years old. Wonka gives her another calculated dose of Wonka-Vite to return her to normal, then gives each of the babies enough Vita-Wonk to restore them too. After the ordeal they are more determined than ever to stay in bed.

A letter arrives from President Gilligrass, thanking them for rescuing the capsule and inviting them to the White House. The grandparents, thrilled by the invitation, jump out of bed and they all dance to a waiting helicopter.

== Editions ==
- ISBN 0-394-82472-5 (hardcover, 1972)
- ISBN 0-394-92472-X (library servings, 1972)
- ISBN 0-04-823106-1 (board book, 1973)
- ISBN 0-14-030755-9 (paperback, 1975)
- ISBN 0-553-15455-9 (paperback, 1984)
- ISBN 0-14-032043-1 (paperback, 1986, illustrated by Michael Foreman)
- ISBN 0-14-032870-X (paperback, 1988)
- ISBN 0-670-85249-X (hardcover, 1995)
- ISBN 0-14-037155-9 (paperback, 1995)
- ISBN 0-14-038533-9 (paperback, 1997)
- ISBN 0-375-91525-7 (library binding, 2001)
- ISBN 0-14-131143-6 (paperback, 2001)
- ISBN 0-375-81525-2 (hardcover, 2001)
- ISBN 0-14-240412-8 (paperback, 2005)
- ISBN 0-141-80780-6 (audio CD read by Eric Idle)
- ISBN 978-0141357850 (paperback, 2018, colour edition illustrated by Quentin Blake)
