= Rusty Goffe =

British actor (born 1948)

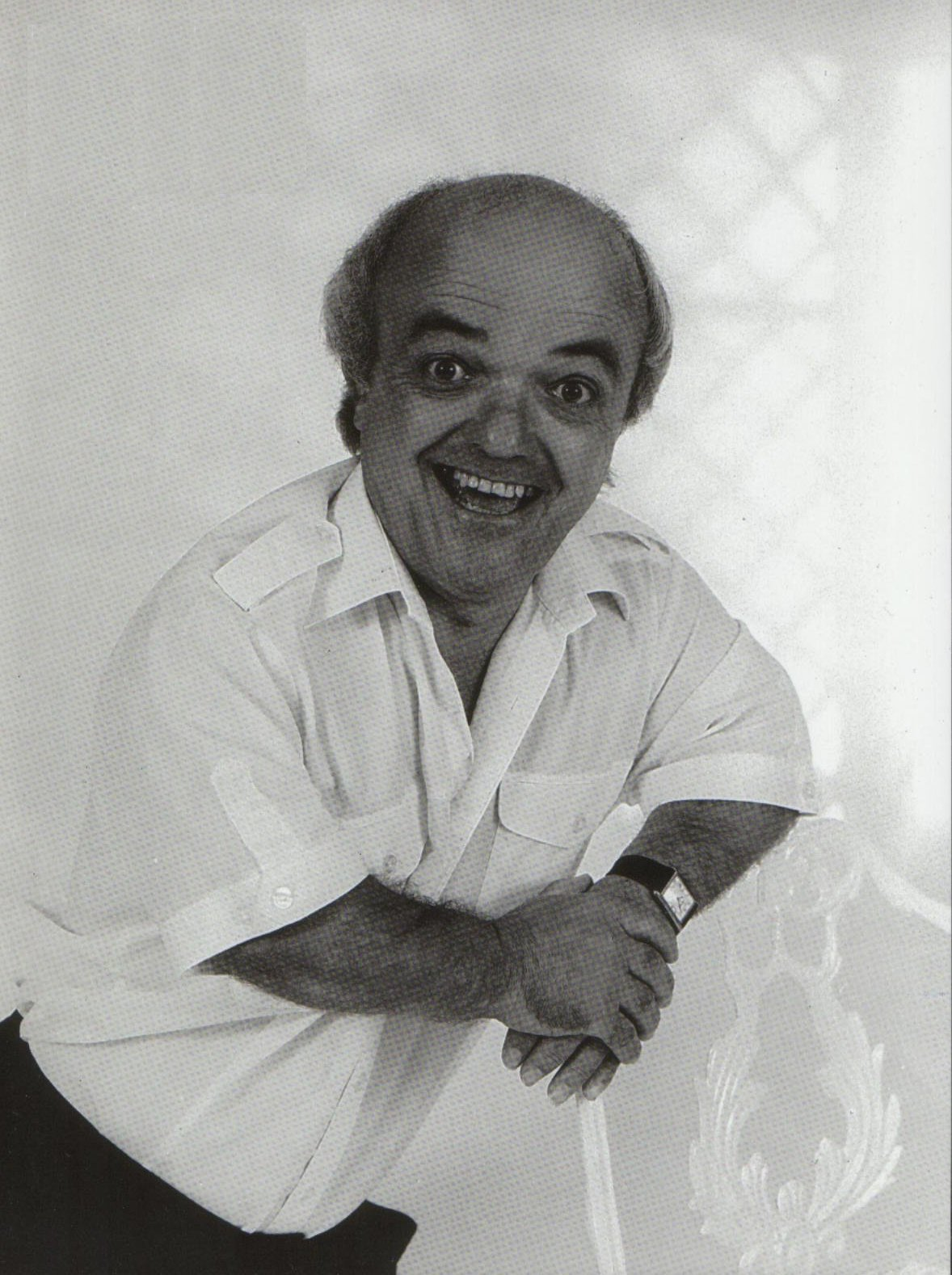
- Goffe in 2007
- Born: 30 October 1948 (age 78); Herne Bay, Kent, England
- Occupation: Actor
- Years active: 1966–2026
- Height: 4 ft 2 in (127 cm)
- Spouse: Sarah Goffe (m. 2019)
- Children: 2

Rusty Goffe (born 30 October 1948) is a retired English actor. He is best known for his appearances in Willy Wonka & the Chocolate Factory, Star Wars Episode IV: A New Hope, and the Harry Potter franchise. He played Goober on Stupid!.

== Early life ==
Goffe was born on 30 October 1948 in Herne Bay, Kent. He attended Sturry Secondary Modern School.

== Acting career ==
Goffe appeared as an Oompa-Loompa in the 1971 version of Willy Wonka & the Chocolate Factory and as a Jawa in Star Wars Episode IV: A New Hope, among a few other aliens. He also appeared in the films Willow and Flash Gordon. He played Le Muff in the film History of the World, Part I and also played Goober, a purple gremlin butler in the CBBC children's sketch show Stupid!

In 2007, Goffe played the lead role in A Kitten for Hitler, a film created by Ken Russell with the intention of making something as offensive as possible. Goffe played a Jewish child who is made into a lamp by Hitler. He is also notable for being the face of Ginsters.

Following the death of Shin Hamano (c. 1936/1937}–2021), who played the Japanese Candy Store Owner, Rusty Goffe and Albert Wilkinson, who both played Ooompa Loompas in the film, were the last surviving members of the adult cast.

Goffe is a member of the Grand Order of Water Rats. He retired from acting in September 2026.

== Personal life ==
On 24 April 2019, Goffe married Sarah Goffe, his girlfriend of over 30 years, in Koh Samui. He has two children.

== Filmography ==
=== Film ===
Year	Title	Role	Notes
1971	Willy Wonka & the Chocolate Factory	Oompa Loompa	uncredited
1972	Disciple of Death	Dwarf Vampire	
1977	Star Wars Episode IV: A New Hope	Kabe / Jawa / GONK Droid	uncredited
1980	Flash Gordon	Ming Guard	
1980	Here Comes Channel 8		TV movie
1988	Willow	Nelwyn Villager	
1990	Death in Venice	Strolling Plaer	TV movie
1993	U.F.O.	Henry VIII	
2001	Harry Potter and the Philosopher's Stone	Gringotts Bank Goblin	uncredited
2004	Harry Potter and the Prisoner of Azkaban	Minor Roles	uncredited
2007	A Kitten for Hitler	Lenny	
2007	Fred Claus	Frosty the Barman	
2007	Harry Potter and the Order of the Phoenix	Bit Part	uncredited
2008	The Colour of Magic	Lackjaw	
2009	Harry Potter and the Half-Blood Prince	Goblin	
2011	Harry Potter and the Deathly Hallows – Part 2	"The Aged Goblin" Chief Bank Teller	
2016	Spidarlings	Alfred	

=== Television ===
Year	Title	Role	Notes
1971–1981	The Goodies	Himself, Little Rolf Harris (uncredited), Dwarf	3 episodes
1981–1983	Are You Being Served?	Mrs. Slocombe's Suitor/Monkey in Monkey Business	2 episodes
1985	'Allo 'Allo!	Monsieur Pierre LeGrand in The Wooing of Widow Artois	1 episode
1996–1999	Britain's Bounciest Weather	Weatherman	L!VE TV
2000–2002	The League of Gentlemen	Simba	3 episodes
2002	Dwarves in Showbiz	Himself	
2003	The 100 Greatest Musicals	Himself	
2003–2005	Little Britain	Macaulay Culkin look-a-like	Season 3 Deleted Scene
2004–2005	Stupid!	Goober	20 episodes
2004–2006	Chucklevision	Peat the Leprechaun, Alien	2 episodes
2014	Doctor Who	Little John	Episode: "Robot of Sherwood"
2026	Wonka's The Golden Ticket	Oompa Loompa	Final role before retiring

=== Commercials ===
- Adult Learning – The "Get Rid of Your Gremlins" Gremlin
- Hygena Furniture
- Lyons Maid Ice Cream
- Ginsters Meat Pies
- Heroquest Board Game
- Battlemaster's Board Game
- Red Dog Hot Dogs

=== Music videos ===
- Monaco – "What Do You Want from Me?"
