= Peter Ostrum =

American veterinarian and actor (born 1957)

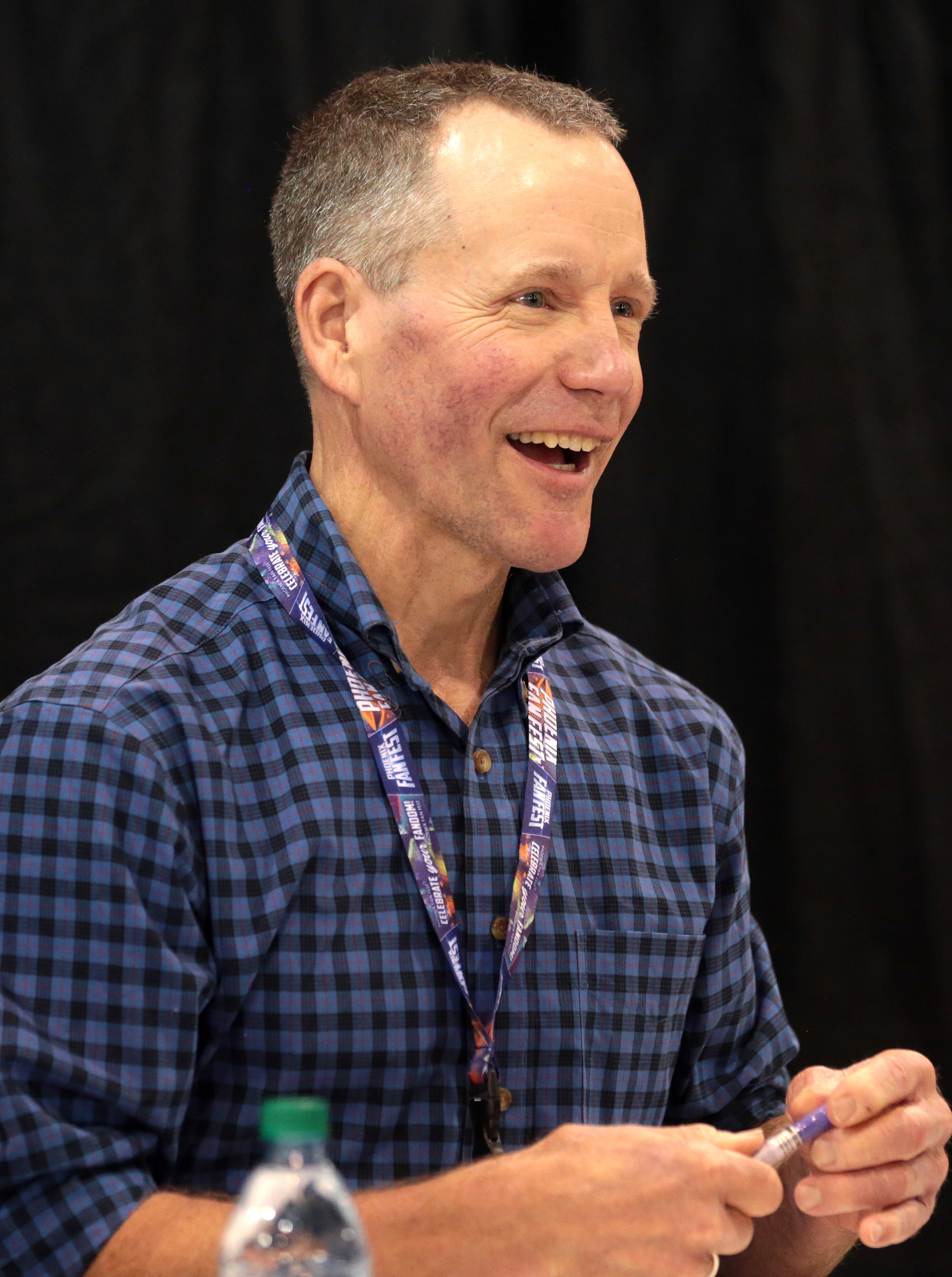
- Ostrum in November 2017
- Born: Peter Gardner Ostrum; November 1, 1957 (age 69); Dallas, Texas, US
- Education: DVM, Cornell University College of Veterinary Medicine (1984)
- Occupations: Actor (1970); Veterinarian (1984–2023)
- Employers: Countryside Veterinary Clinic; Dairy Health & Mgmt. Services
- Known for: Playing Charlie Bucket in Willy Wonka & the Chocolate Factory and in Netflix's "Wonka's The Golden Ticket"
- Spouse: Loretta M. Lepkowski
- Children: 2

Peter Gardner Ostrum (/ˈoʊstrəm/ OH-strəm; born November 1, 1957) is an American retired veterinarian and former child actor, whose only film role was as Charlie Bucket in the 1971 motion picture Willy Wonka & the Chocolate Factory.

Ostrum was 12 years old when selected by talent agents for Willy Wonka. Though he enjoyed the experience of shooting the film, he opted not to sign a three-film contract when it was over. After eschewing a career in film and theater, he was reluctant to speak about his one starring role. In 1990, he began an annual tradition of speaking to schoolchildren about the film, and he became a subject of interest again when the 2005 film Charlie and the Chocolate Factory – which re-adapted the story – was released to theaters.

Ostrum became interested in his family's horses when he returned from shooting Willy Wonka and was particularly influenced by the veterinarian who tended to them. Ostrum received a Doctorate of Veterinary Medicine from Cornell University College of Veterinary Medicine in 1984 and retired by late 2023. As of 2021, he lived in Glenfield, New York with his wife Loretta (née Lepkowski), having raised two children.

== Personal life ==
Peter Gardner Ostrum was born in Dallas, Texas on November 1, 1957, to Dean Gardner Ostrum (1922–2014) and Sarepta Mabel (née Pierpont; 1922–2021). He is the youngest of four children. Ostrum was living in Cleveland at age twelve—a city of which he was described as a native by MSNBC, and later attended North Hunterdon Regional High School in Hunterdon County, New Jersey.

Ostrum married Loretta M. Lepkowski in 1987 or 1988. They have two children, Helenka and Leif, with the latter following his father onto the stage as the leading actor in several South Lewis Central School musicals. Ostrum and his wife lived in Glenfield, New York, as recently as 2021.

== Willy Wonka ==
Ostrum was in the sixth grade and performing at the Cleveland Play House children's theater, when he was noticed by talent agents who were searching nationwide for an actor to portray Charlie Bucket in Willy Wonka & the Chocolate Factory. The agents took Polaroid photos of Ostrum and recorded him reading from the original novel, then returned to New York. Two months later, Ostrum was called to New York for a screen test where he sang "My Country, 'Tis of Thee", and a month after that, he was contacted and given ten days to prepare to leave for filming. Ostrum left for Munich on August 10, 1970.

Peter was a child who acted—he wasn't a child actor. He had none of the obvious technique, tricks, or affectations of the kind that TV kid actors had, and continue to have. He was genuine, and his sincerity as a person shines through in his performance. He was an extremely intelligent kid, who was both self-aware and skilled at what he was doing.

— Frawley Becker,
dialogue coach for Willy Wonka

In 2000, Ostrum recalled that shooting Willy Wonka in Munich was "sort of like being an exchange student for five months". Fond memories of his five months in West Germany included watching the construction of Olympiapark, for the 1972 Summer Olympics, and working with Gene Wilder and Jack Albertson. As Ostrum had not worked in film before, Wilder took it upon himself to instruct the young actor in the business. Ostrum would later describe Wilder as a quirky yet gentle gentleman who "treated people with respect and dignity". The bond that developed between the two actors was such that, even though they never saw each other again after filming Willy Wonka, Ostrum described Wilder's 2016 death as "like losing a parent"; in the 2023 documentary Remembering Gene Wilder, Ostrum remembered Wilder being fun to work with, and not speaking down to the child actors.

Ostrum was tutored on-set for three hours a day, though sometimes only for 30–60 minutes at a time. Though in his audition he had been assured that his singing would probably be cut and dubbed, it was Ostrum's own singing voice that made it to the screen—albeit significantly cut. In a 2011 interview, Ostrum told the story of how director Mel Stuart gave him a clapperboard from the film, but later asked how he got it because he had forgotten that he had done so; it is Ostrum's only souvenir from the set.

After he finished shooting Willy Wonka, the then 13-year-old Ostrum declined David L. Wolper's offer of a three-film contract. The teenager confided in Frawley Becker, his Willy Wonka dialogue coach, that he turned down the contract to retain "the freedom to choose what he played, and in what picture." (Ostrum and Becker remained friends through at least 1996.) In January 2018, Ostrum said he sometimes misses acting—though not its hurry-up-and-wait nature—but feels he dodged having to make the transition from child- to adult-actor.

As of January 2018, Ostrum still received US$8–9 (equivalent to $10–12 in 2025) of royalty payments about every three months.

=== Lasting effect ===
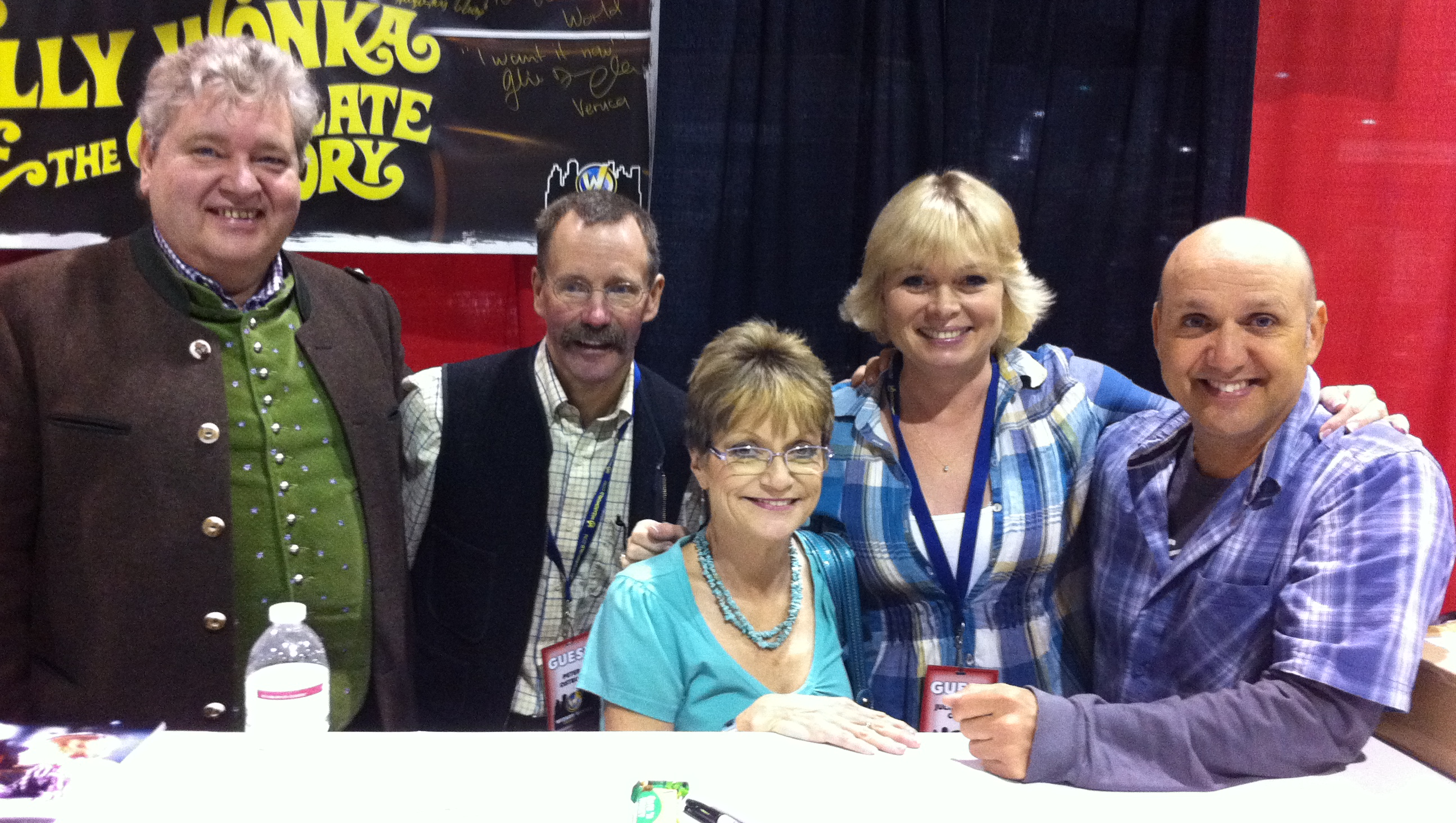
Ostrum (second from left) in 2011 with the Willy Wonka child cast

In his senior year, Ostrum was involved in film class and, at the interest of one of his instructors, looked back into theater and acting. After auditioning for, but not landing, several roles (including for Alan Strang in Equus on Broadway), Ostrum decided not to pursue it further. After putting his short film career behind him, Ostrum declined reporters and interviews, preferring not to speak on the subject. For some time, Ostrum even lied and told people that his brother, and not he, had starred in the film. It took Ostrum years after moving to Lowville, New York, before he told anybody there about his one-time stardom; even his wife Loretta did not know about his role until he warned her about it just before she met his mother.

Since 1990, Ostrum has spoken to students at Lowville Academy once a year—on the last day of school, as a special treat—about his experience in Willy Wonka as well as his work in veterinary medicine. The students chiefly ask about the film's special effects, and Ostrum describes to them "what happened to Veruca, how did Violet blow up like a blueberry, how did Charlie fly with Grandpa Joe, all those types of questions". Ostrum also accepted an invitation to appear at the 2018 Snowtown Film Festival in Watertown, New York, answering audience questions after a screening of the film; "it's in my backyard—it's become a popular event in January and I like to support local events." Ostrum said of the 2018 event that he enjoyed re-watching the film, and that people ask him "great questions." Ostrum has been called "the most famous man in Lowville", where the local video rental shop twice wore out its VHS copy of Willy Wonka & the Chocolate Factory.

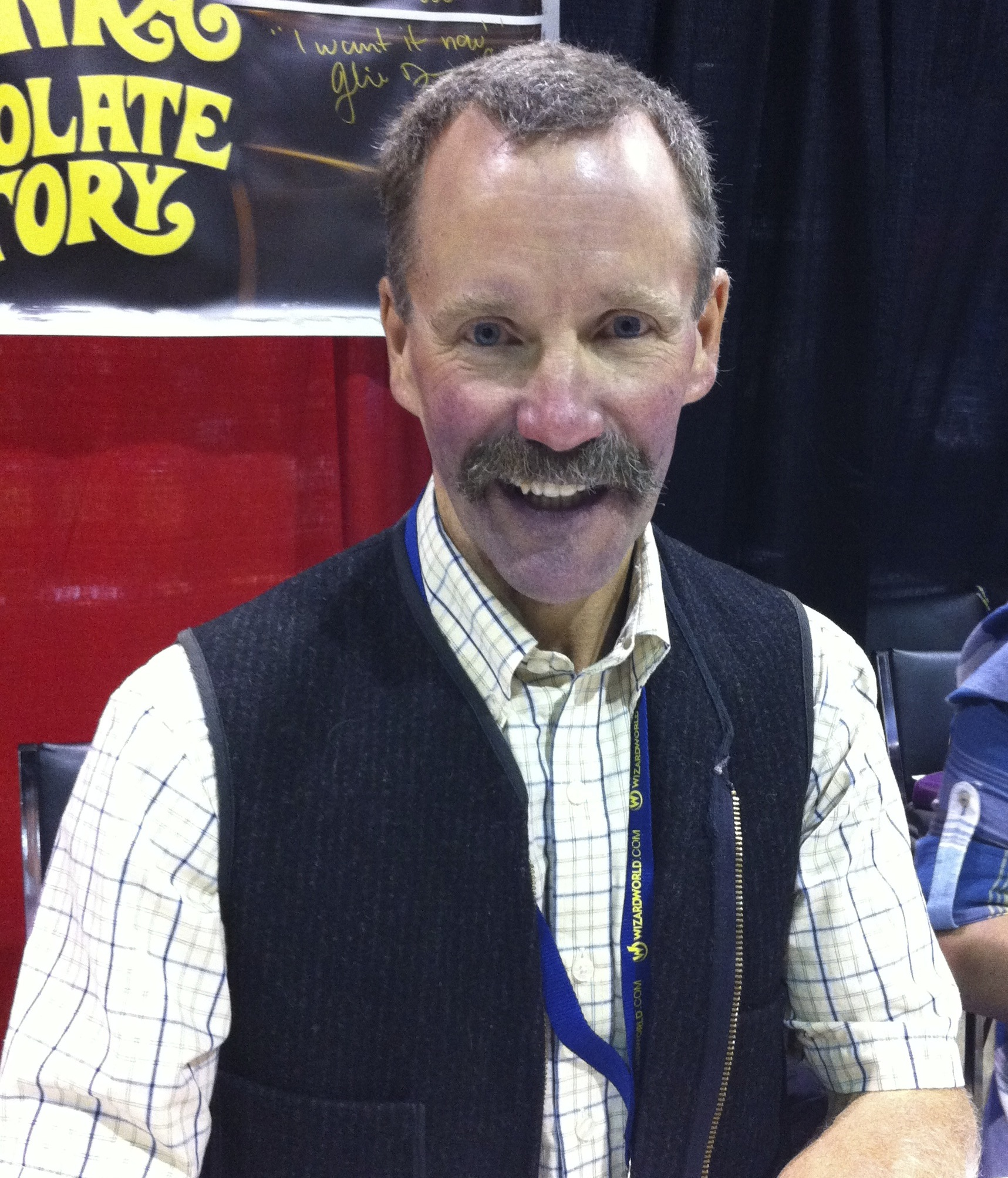
Ostrum in 2011

In the run-up to the release of Charlie and the Chocolate Factory in 2005, Ostrum garnered a spate of attention that included seeing the film in New York City with NPR as well as being included in VH1's list of "100 Greatest Kid Stars" (at 78th). On the new film, Ostrum quoted fellow Willy Wonka actor Julie Dawn Cole, saying, "It's sort of like going back to a house that you once lived in and it's been redecorated." Ultimately, the media attention was so pervasive that Ostrum stopped answering his phone, and declined further interviews. Of the Johnny Depp-led film, he later said that it served to return "the original film back to the forefront again." When interviewed about the production of 2023's Wonka, Ostrum welcomed its expansion of the fictional universe, saying he was looking forward to the Timothée Chalamet-led prequel.

In October 2000, Ostrum and some of his co-stars from the film were scheduled to record an audio commentary for a special edition DVD. In January 2009, Ostrum teamed up with Dunkin' Donuts to hand out free rides on the Massachusetts Bay Transportation Authority (MBTA) at South Station in Boston; Ostrum's participation connected the MBTA's CharlieCards he was handing out with his portrayal of Charlie Bucket in Willy Wonka. The promotion also gave out one "golden ticket", worth unlimited rides on MBTA and unlimited Dunkin' Donuts coffee for 2009. In 2011, Ostrum joined Willy Wonka co-stars Denise Nickerson (Violet Beauregarde) and Paris Themmen (Mike Teevee) for a reunion commemorating the 40th anniversary of the film's release. That year, they were also joined by Julie Dawn Cole (Veruca Salt) as guests on Top Chef: Just Desserts to taste contestants' creations.

Ostrum would later make a cameo in the opening of the first episode of the Netflix competition series Wonka's The Golden Ticket.

== Veterinary career ==
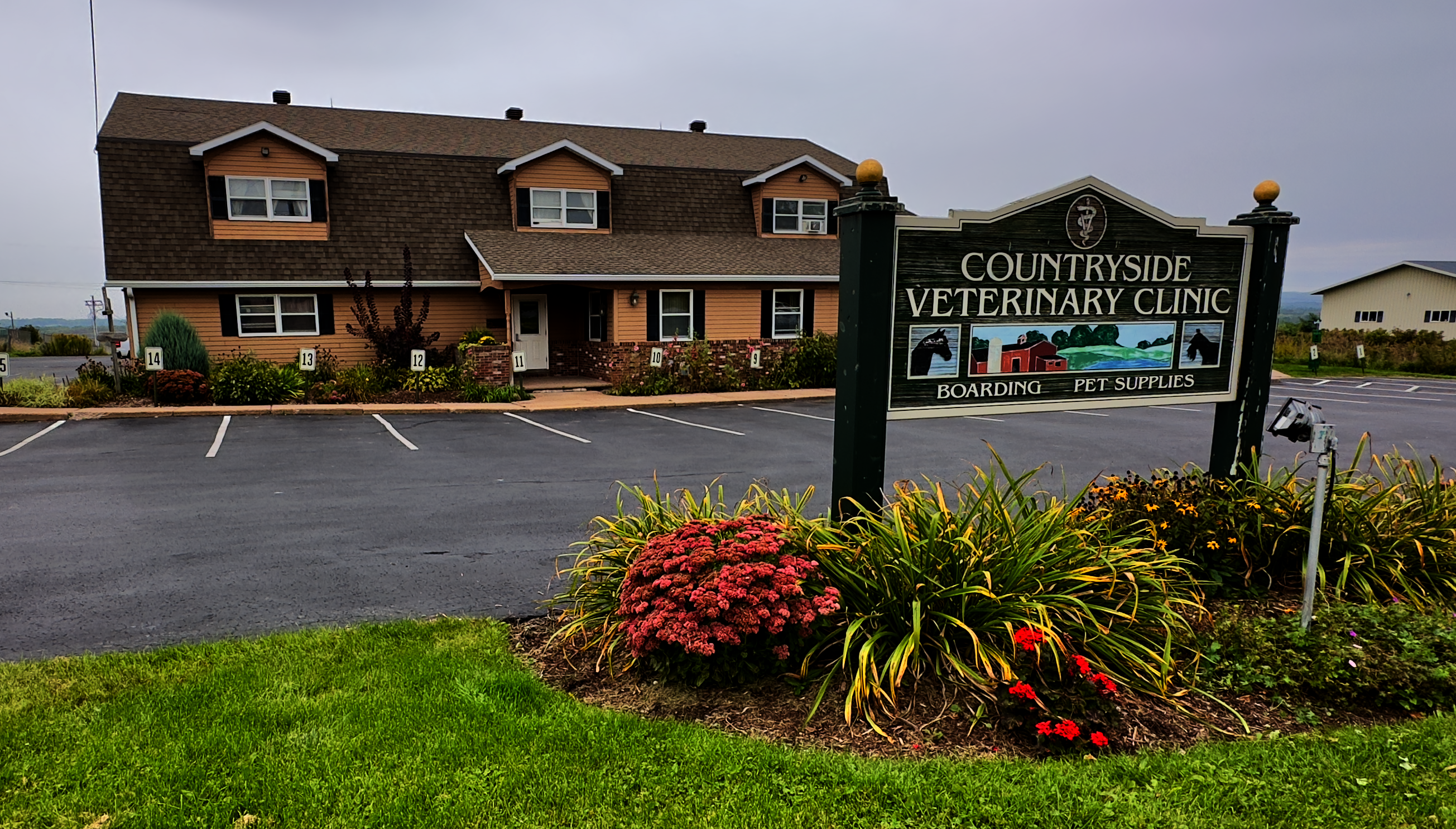
Ostrum was retired from the Countryside Veterinary Clinic in Lowville by September 2023.

Soon after Ostrum returned home from filming Willy Wonka, his family acquired a horse; while the teenaged Ostrum was interested in the horse, it was the animal's veterinarian that left a lasting impression on him: "This person really enjoyed what he did for a living. My father was a lawyer, and I really didn't have a clue what he did all day. But I knew exactly what the veterinarian did. Someone making a living from something he enjoyed so much really sparked my interest." Taking a hiatus from school between high school and college, Ostrum groomed horses and worked at the Delaware Equine Center in Pennsylvania. He contemplated a return to Hollywood, and even visited California for a week to "test the waters" there. He ultimately decided to pursue a degree in veterinary medicine instead, feeling that he would forever berate himself if he did not. In 1984, Ostrum received his Doctorate of Veterinary Medicine from Cornell University College of Veterinary Medicine.

By September 2023, Ostrum retired from the Countryside Veterinary Clinic in Lowville, New York, where he had worked mainly with horses and cows. He had also worked with Veterinarians on Call, a Pfizer-funded video series that highlighted the work of large animal veterinarians, and as a managing partner with Dairy Health & Management Services.
