= Wonka's The Golden Ticket =

2026 reality competition series

- Promotional poster
- Genre: Reality competition
- Based on: Charlie and the Chocolate Factory by Roald Dahl
- Directed by: Rich Kim
- Narrated by: Gene Wilder (AI recreation)
- Country of origin: United States
- Original language: English
- No. of seasons: 1
- No. of episodes: 9

Production
- Executive producers: Chris Culvenor; Paul Franklin; Rikkie Proost; David Tibballs; Alison Holloway; Emer Harkin
- Production location: Australia
- Running time: 50 minutes
- Production companies: Eureka Productions; Warner Horizon Unscripted Television

Original release
- Network: Netflix
- Release: September 23, 2026 – present

Related
- Willy Wonka & the Chocolate Factory

Wonka's The Golden Ticket is an American reality competition television series that premiered on Netflix on September 23, 2026. It is based on Roald Dahl's novel Charlie and the Chocolate Factory and the 1971 film Willy Wonka & the Chocolate Factory.

Twelve pairs with a pre-existing relationship enter a recreated chocolate factory with a partner and compete in a series of challenges for a cash prize described as a "lifetime supply of money" – $3 million paid over 30 years.

The first seven episodes of season 1 were released on September 23, with the final two episodes released on September 30.

== Premise ==
Contestants receive chocolate bars that may contain a Golden Ticket, those who find one bring a partner into the factory. Once inside they take part in physical games, tests of judgment, and various temptations built around elements from the original story. The elements include a chocolate river, lickable wallpaper, a forced-perspective hallway, and “Wonkavision” challenges. Contestants are eliminated until one winner remains.

The series has no traditional host and the voice of Willy Wonka is an AI recreation of Gene Wilder's performance from the 1971 film, created with the consent of his estate. Additionally, American TV hosts Nick Cannon, Howie Mandel, and Wayne Brady each virtually appear as guest hosts for TV game show themed challenges in "WonkaVision 2.0".

== Contestants ==
The 12 pairs were revealed on September 22, 2026.

Contestants	Age	Partner	Relationship	Status
Gabrielle Wright	22	Sasha	Best Friends	Winner; Episode 9
Taylor Schilling	23	Bryce	Dating	Runner-up; Episode 9
Garrison Wilson	30	Shawn	Son/Mother	Terminated; Episode 9
Ziad Mansour	32	Austin	Roommates	Terminated; Episode 9
Bryce Lee	22	Taylor	Dating	Terminated; Episode 8
Austin Keil	29	Ziad	Roommates	Terminated; Episode 8
Jackson Jobes	25	Ray	Grandson/Grandparent	Terminated; Episode 7
Tatum Filegar	27	Kellye	Daughter/Mother	Terminated; Episode 7
Everett Toy	36	James	Brothers	Terminated; Episode 7
Ava Ganz	25	Jeff	Daughter/Father	Terminated; Episode 6
Sasha Brenden	24	Gabrielle	Best Friends	Terminated; Episode 6
Jeff Ganz	69	Ava	Daughter/Father	Terminated; Episode 6
Kellye Cash	61	Tatum	Daughter/Mother	Terminated; Episode 6
Hunter Church	31	Moon	Brothers	Terminated; Episode 6
Kayla Henry	34	Bill	Father/Daughter	Terminated; Episode 5
Shawn Johnson	64	Garrison	Son/Mother	Terminated; Episode 5
Ray Jobes	79	Jackson	Grandson/Grandparent	Terminated; Episode 5
Bill Henry	63	Kayla	Father/Daughter	Terminated; Episode 4
Marcy Winchester	63	JoAnne	Best Friends	Terminated; Episode 4
JoAnne Ogden Carney	60	Marcy	Best Friends	Terminated; Episode 4
James Toy	38	Everett	Brothers	Terminated; Episode 3
Nick Spinelli	37	Jason	Coworkers	Terminated; Episode 3
Jason Jani	49	Nick	Coworkers	Terminated; Episode 2
Moon Lander	29	Hunter	Brothers	Terminated; Episode 2

Other Appearances

Oompa-Loompa performers include Rusty Goffe, Ben Goffe, Mitchell Marion, Tiffany Sarich, Beccy Benjamin, Ash Hodgkinson, Dane Noonan, Daniel Stone, and Alivia McCarthy. Peter Ostrum (the original Charlie Bucket), David Chang, Sean Evans, Nick Cannon, Howie Mandel, Wayne Brady and Zach King also made cameo appearances.

== Contestant progress ==
Place	Contestant	Challenge																		
Place	Contestant	Gumball	Wheel of Misfortune	Whirl Power	Termination Contract	Free Bees	Bubble Jeopardy	Has Bean	Lickety Split	WonkaVator				Out of Sorts	Loompa-Like	Steal or No Steal	Eggs	Coins Saving	Wonka-Maze	Perceiving Your Jury
Place	Contestant	Gumball	Wheel of Misfortune	Whirl Power	Termination Contract	Free Bees	Bubble Jeopardy	Has Bean	Lickety Split	Everstacking Gobstoppers	Sweet Tooth	Laughing Loompa	Final Card	Out of Sorts	Loompa-Like	Steal or No Steal	Eggs	Coins Saving	Wonka-Maze	Perceiving Your Jury
1	Gabrielle	Safe	Safe	Safe	Safe	Saved	Winner	Safe	Safe	In Danger	—N/a	—N/a	—N/a	Saved	Safe	Saved	Saved	Saved	Saved	Winner
2	Taylor	In Danger	Safe	Safe	Safe	Saved	In Danger	Safe	Safe	—N/a	—N/a	—N/a	In Danger	Safe	Safe	Saved	In Danger	Saved	Saved	Runner-up
3	Garrison	Safe	Safe	Safe	Safe	Safe	Safe	Safe	Safe	—N/a	In Danger	—N/a	—N/a	Saved	Safe	Saved	Saved	Saved	Terminated	
4	Ziad	In Danger	Safe	Safe	Safe	Safe	Safe	In Danger	Saved	In Danger	—N/a	—N/a	—N/a	In Danger	Safe	Saved	Saved	Terminated		
5	Bryce	Safe	Safe	Saved	Safe	Safe	Safe	Saved	Safe	—N/a	In Danger	—N/a	—N/a	Saved	Safe	Saved	Terminated			
6	Austin	Safe	Safe	Safe	Safe	Safe	Saved	Safe	Safe	—N/a	In Danger	—N/a	—N/a	Safe	Safe	Terminated				
7	Jackson	Safe	In Danger	Safe	Safe	Safe	In Danger	Safe	Safe	In Danger	—N/a	—N/a	—N/a	Safe	Safe	Terminated				
8	Tatum	Safe	Safe	Safe	Safe	Safe	Safe	Safe	Saved	—N/a	—N/a	In Danger	—N/a	Safe	Terminated					
9	Everett	Safe	Safe	Saved	Safe	In Danger	In Danger	Safe	In Danger	—N/a	—N/a	In Danger	—N/a	Terminated						
10	Ava	Saved	Safe	Saved	Safe	Saved	Safe	Safe	In Danger	—N/a	—N/a	—N/a	Terminated							
11	Sasha	Safe	Safe	Safe	Safe	Saved	Safe	Saved	Safe	—N/a	—N/a	Terminated								
12	Jeff	In Danger	Safe	Safe	In Danger	Safe	In Danger	Safe	Safe	—N/a	Terminated									
12	Kellye	Safe	Safe	Safe	Safe	In Danger	In Danger	Safe	Saved	—N/a	Terminated									
14	Hunter	Safe	In Danger	Safe	Safe	Safe	In Danger	Safe	In Danger	Terminated										
15	Kayla	Safe	Safe	Safe	Safe	Saved	Safe	Saved	Terminated											
15	Shawn	Safe	Safe	Safe	Safe	Safe	In Danger	Safe	Terminated											
17	Ray	Safe	Saved	In Danger	Safe	In Danger	Safe	Terminated												
18	Bill	Safe	In Danger	Safe	Safe	Safe	Terminated													
19	JoAnne	Safe	Safe	Safe	Safe	Terminated														
19	Marcy	In Danger	In Danger	Safe	Safe	Terminated														
21	James	Safe	Safe	Safe	Terminated															
22	Nick	Safe	Safe	Terminated																
23	Jason	Safe	Terminated																	
24	Moon	Terminated																		

== Episodes ==
No. overall	No. in season	Title	Original release date
1	1	"No Turning Back Now"	September 23, 2026
2	2	"I Just Got Out Of A Gumball Dude!"	September 23, 2026
3	3	"Spinning Out"	September 23, 2026
4	4	"Bad Dad"	September 23, 2026
5	5	"Alligator Tears"	September 23, 2026
6	6	"It's Gonna Be A Bloodbath"	September 23, 2026
7	7	"The Great Divide"	September 23, 2026
8	8	"Battle Royale"	September 30, 2026
9	9	"Wonka Loves A Twist"	September 30, 2026

== Production ==
The series was produced by Eureka Productions, a Fremantle company, for Netflix. It was made in collaboration with the Roald Dahl Story Company and the Gene Wilder Estate. Executive producers are Chris Culvenor, Paul Franklin, Rikkie Proost, David Tibballs, Alison Holloway, and Emer Harkin.

Filming took place at Village Roadshow Studios on the Gold Coast in Australia. Additional filming took place for exterior factory scenes at the White Bay Power Station in Sydney. The production built an 88,000-square-foot (8,200 m^{2}) set across three studios that includes a 27,000-US-gallon (100,000 L) chocolate river. It was reported as the largest set ever constructed in Australia for a television production of this kind. The project received support from Australian location incentives and Screen Queensland. The production was expected to contribute an estimated $17 million to Queensland's local economy and support more than 210 employment opportunities. The project was secured through Screen Queensland's Production Attraction Strategy and received support from the Australian Government's Location Offset and the City of Gold Coast's Screen Attraction Program.

Rusty Goffe, who appeared as an Oompa-Loompa in the 1971 film, returns for the series in his final acting role. Goffe stated, "I started on Willy Wonka & the Chocolate Factory, and now Wonka's The Golden Ticket is my swan song. I've just ended my career on Willy Wonka. Isn't that wonderful?". He is joined by a new group of performers that includes his son Ben Goffe.

== Release ==
Netflix announced the series on June 30, 2026, releasing a teaser the same day. A full trailer followed in August. The first seven episodes of the season premiered on September 23, 2026, and the remaining two episodes, comprising the season finale, were released on September 30, 2026.

== Viewership ==
According to Nielsen's streaming ratings, which measure viewing on television sets in the United States, the series debuted at fifth place overall in its first week. In its second week, covering September 28 to October 4, 2026, it rose to first place overall and first among original series with 1.08 billion minutes viewed, a 26 percent increase on its opening week.

== Reception ==
Writing for Geek Vibes Nation, Ricky Valero rated the series 8 out of 10, calling it one of the best new reality series of 2026 and praising its set design and the pace of its early eliminations, which he compared to Beast Games.

Early critical response was mixed. Reviewers generally praised the scale and detail of the factory sets while criticizing the use of an AI recreation of Gene Wilder's voice and describing the challenges as formulaic. Several comparisons were made to earlier Netflix competition series such as Squid Game: The Challenge.
