= Oompa-Loompas =

Charlie and the Chocolate Factory race

- Charlie and the Chocolate Factory race
- The Oompa-Loompas in 1971 pictured with Gene Wilder as Willy Wonka
- First appearance: Charlie and the Chocolate Factory
- Last appearance: Wonka's The Golden Ticket
- Created by: Roald Dahl

In-universe information
- Other name: Whipple-Scrumpets
- Leader: Willy Wonka

The Oompa-Loompas are a fictional race of people in the Charlie and the Chocolate Factory franchise based on the original book by Roald Dahl. In all versions of the story, they are depicted as little people who form the workforce of Willy Wonka's chocolate factory, and are paid in cocoa beans. However, their appearance and backstory change depending on the version.

== Background ==
Willy Wonka's competition with rival chocolatiers Arthur Slugworth, Mr. Fickelgruber, and Mr. Prodnose was said to have been inspired by rivalry between Cadbury and Rowntree, both companies which had been accused of sourcing slave labour for chocolate production. When Charlie and the Chocolate Factory was published in 1964, it included three thousand Oompa-Loompas as African Pygmies forced to stay at Willy Wonka's factory, compensated only with chocolate. These characters may have mirrored the situation of cocoa workers at the time.

== Design and characteristics ==
The Oompa-Loompas are described as being no larger than medium-sized dolls, with rosy-white skin and long golden-brown hair. They wear the same clothes they wore at Loompaland: the men wear deerskins, the women wear leaves and the children wear nothing at all.

Before moving to Willy Wonka's chocolate factory, the Oompa-Loompas lived in Loompaland, where they lived in constant fear of the predators that would eat them. Their main source of food were green caterpillars that tasted disgusting, so they would mash the caterpillars with bugs and plants to make them slightly less disgusting. Their favourite food is cocoa beans. When Willy Wonka arrived, he told the chief he and his people can come live and work at his factory and have all the cocoa beans they want.

In the first edition of Charlie and the Chocolate Factory, the Oompa-Loompas are depicted as dark-skinned African pygmies. This was a source of controversy, and in 1970 the NAACP criticised the story and stated the Oompa-Loompas had overtones of slavery. Dahl insisted the Oompa-Loompas had no racist origin, saying the criticism was "real Nazi stuff". Dahl and children's author Eleanor Cameron sparred publicly about the depiction of Oompa-Loompas. However, he later rewrote the book, changing the Oompa-Loompa's skin colour to white and changing the origin of the Oompa-Loompas from Africa to the made-up "Loompaland". The second design was drawn by British illustrator Faith Jaques.

In the 1971 film, the Oompa-Loompas are depicted as having orange skin, green pompadour-like hairstyles, and sporting brown shirts and white dungarees. They were portrayed by dwarf actors Rudy Borgstaller, George Claydon, Malcolm Dixon, Rusty Goffe, Ismed Hassan, Norman McGlen, Angelo Muscat, Pepe Poupee, Marcus Powell, and Albert Wilkinson.

In the 2005 film, the Oompa-Loompas are all identical, and they sport space age jumpsuits. They were all played by Kenyan-British dwarf actor Deep Roy and voiced by Danny Elfman.

In the 2023 prequel Wonka, the Oompa-Loompas are primarily embodied by the solitary "Lofty", portrayed by Hugh Grant, although different actors portray other similar-looking Oompa-Loompas in a flashback sequence. Their appearances match the design of the 1971 film's Oompa-Loompas, although their small stature and orange complexion were created using computer-generated effects. The Oompa-Loompas in Loompaland are portrayed to wear outfits and carry halberds similar to the Swiss Guard.

== Cultural impact ==
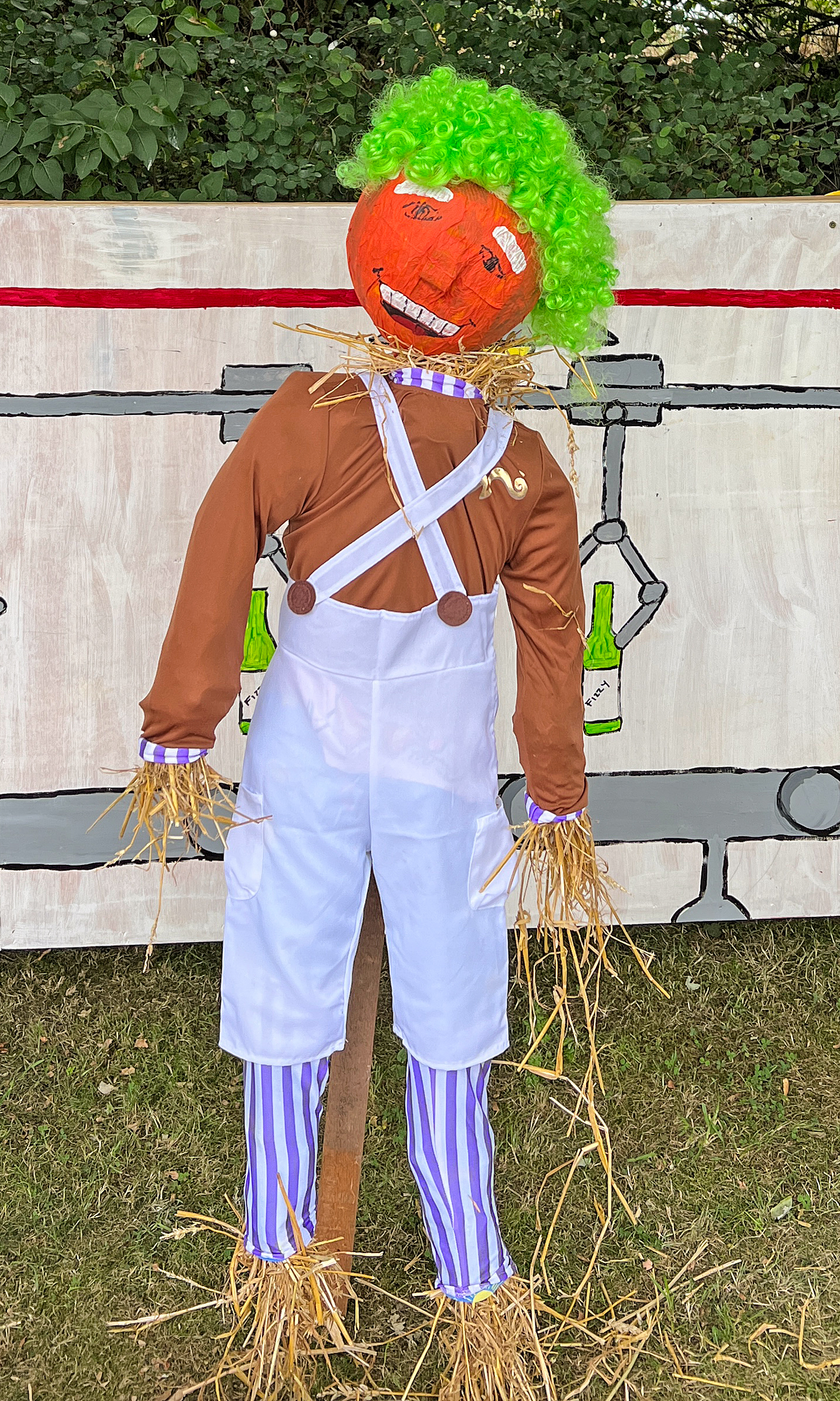
An Oompa-Loompa scarecrow

The Oompa-Loompas were one of the main inspirations for Despicable Me's Minions.

In 2017, the spider species Myrmecium oompaloompa was named after the Oompa-Loompas. The name comes from the fact that they were first discovered on cocoa plantations in Brazil.

In 2023, American musician Jagwar Twin released the single "Bad Feeling (Oompa Loompa)". The song utilises the lyrics and melody from the refrain of the Oompa-Loompa songs in the 1971 film. The song reached #36 on the US Hot Rock & Alternative Songs and #33 on the Pop Airplay.

In 2024, Willy's Chocolate Experience, an unlicensed Charlie and the Chocolate Factory event, was held in Glasgow, Scotland. An image of a disgruntled and weary-looking Oompa-Loompa (Note: Oompa-Loompas are referred to as "Wonkidoodles" in the AI-generated script) played by actress Kirsty Paterson went viral and subsequently became an internet meme. In September 2026, Netflix announced that Paterson will appear as an actual Oompa-Loompa in the game show, Wonka's The Golden Ticket.

In the US 2024 presidential election, current US President, and 2024 Republican Party nominee Donald Trump sparked global internet memes after comparisons to the stereotypical Oompa-Loompa look, targeting his supposed "fluorescent eyebrows" and "orange tempered skin".

== Analysis ==
Dahl's portrayal of the Oompa-Loompas has been criticised as promotion of colonialism. Food anthropologist Layla Eplett argued that Dahl treated the Oompa-Loompas as foreign objects. Deji Olukotun of PEN America opposed banning Charlie and the Chocolate Factory, arguing that teachers should instead compel children to question its portrayal of Oompa-Loompas.

== See also ==
- Roald Dahl revision controversy
- Dwarfism
