= Robin Lett =

English cricketer (born 1986)

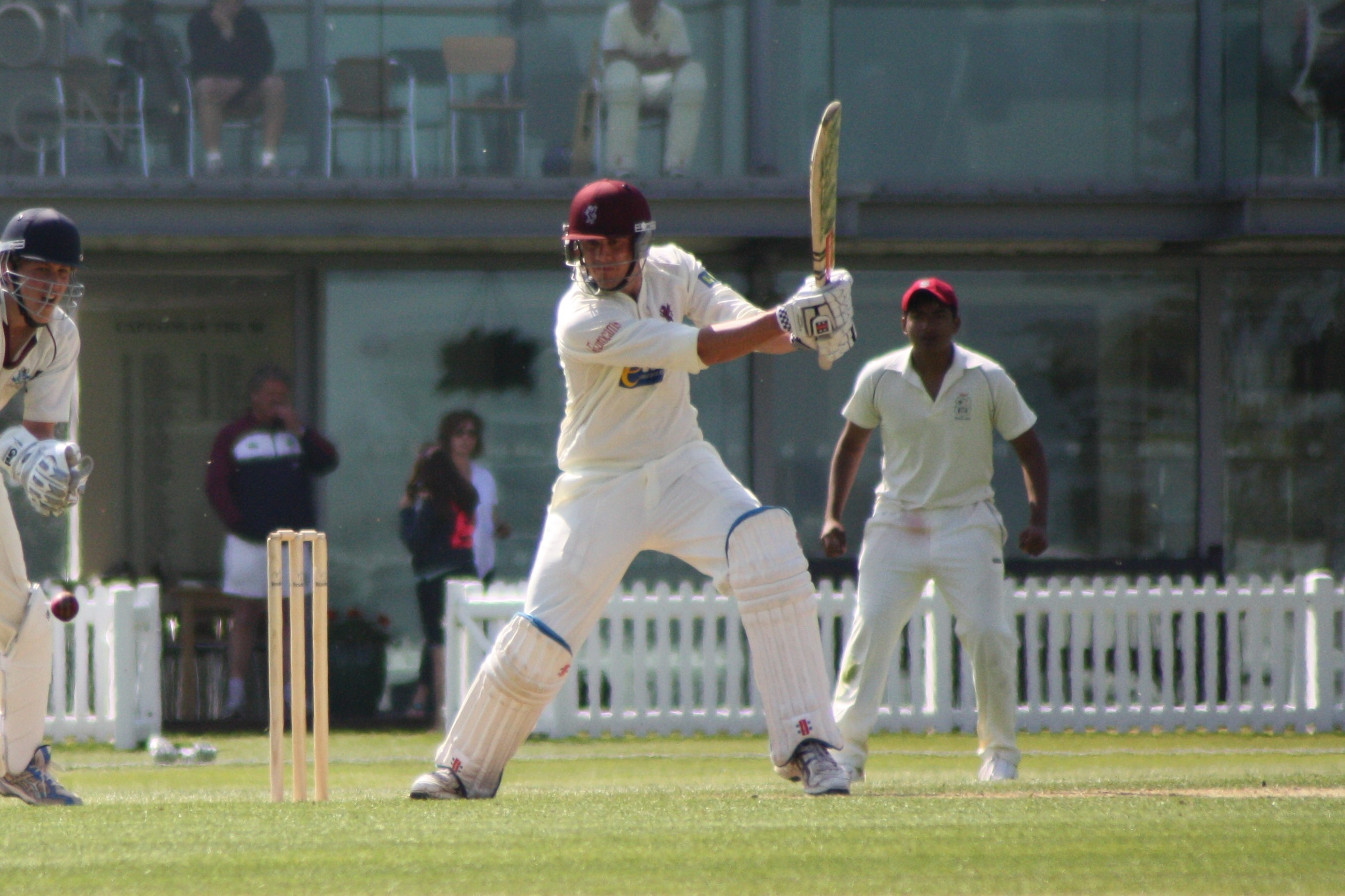

Personal information
- Full name: Robin Jonathan Hugh Lett
- Born: 23 December 1986 (age 39); Westminster, London, England
- Height: 6 ft 2 in (1.88 m)
- Batting: Right-handed
- Bowling: Right-arm medium

Domestic team information
- Years: Team
- 2006–2010: Somerset
- 2007–2009: Oxford UCCE
- 2011: Unicorns

Career statistics
Competition	FC	LA
Matches	12	3
Runs scored	401	14
Batting average	26.73	4.66
100s/50s	0/5	0/0
Top score	76*	10
Balls bowled	102	–
Wickets	1	–
Bowling average	67.00	–
5 wickets in innings	0	–
10 wickets in match	0	–
Best bowling	1/39	–
Catches/stumpings	4/–	1/–
- Source: , 20 September 2020

Robin Jonathan Hugh Lett (born 23 December 1986 in Westminster, London) is an English cricketer who played for Somerset and OUCCE. He is a right-handed batsman and occasional right-arm bowler. He was educated at Millfield School and Oxford Brookes University.

After consistent performances in the Somerset Second XI in 2005 and 2006 he made his first-class debut against Glamorgan in late 2006 making exactly 50. In August 2010, Somerset's Director of Cricket, Brian Rose announced that Lett's contract would not be renewed for the 2011 season.
