= Prebound =

Books given a hardback cover

A prebound book is a book that has been given a durable, library‑quality hardcover binding. Libraries commonly prebind paperbacks in a stronger cover.

== See also ==
- Library binding
