= Library binding =

Binding method

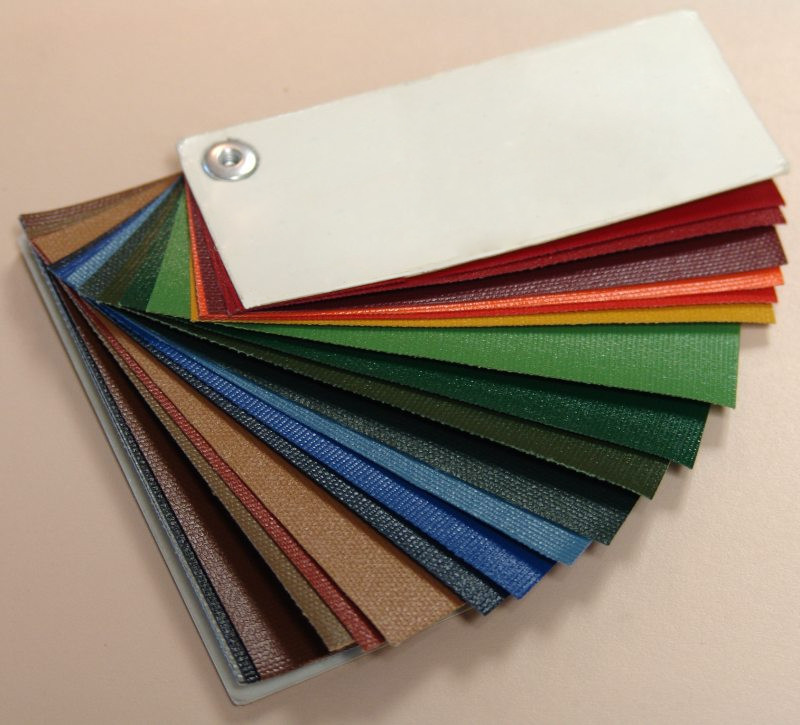
Buckram variety swatches that can be used to cover books.

Library binding is a method of increasing the life of books and periodicals used in libraries. This is done by sewing the pages in place and by reinforcing the spine for each volume. The goal of library binding is long-term preservation. However, library bound books also benefit library patrons by ensuring that the volume in hand is complete, opened with ease, and easy to photocopy.

In addition, many libraries re-bind damaged books in library bindings regardless of whether they were originally paperback or hardcover.

== Types ==
Library binding can be divided into the two major categories of "original" and "after market". The original category is as it says: the book was originally bound with the idea that it would be used in a library setting where the book would receive harder use than those usual trade editions sold to the public.

The aftermarket library binding is the method of binding serials, and re-binding paperback or hardcover books, for use within libraries. Library binding increases the durability of books, as well as making the materials easier to use.

== Methods and materials ==
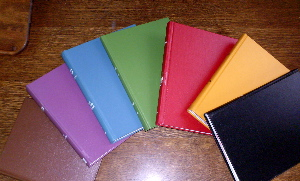
The buckram used to cover library bound books comes in a variety of colors.

Most library binders use a method of bookbinding called oversewing to secure the volumes. Oversewing involves cutting or milling off the spines of the volumes, creating a block of loose pages. Then the loose sheets are combined into small units or signatures, which are secured with overlock stitching. The separate signatures then get sewn together, creating a single book block. Often a piece of linen is glued to the book block spine for further support. The spine of the volume sometimes is rounded and backed to keep the spine from caving in. But if the paper of the volume is too fragile, or the book block is too thick, the spine is left flat. The book block is placed in a sturdy cover or case, with special paper covering the inside covers.

The most common cloth used by library binders to cover the boards of the book is buckram coated with acrylic. Acrylic coatings are generally resistant to water, mold, insects, and ultra-violet light. The buckram used is a 100% cotton, bulky fabric designed to withstand wear and tear. Smaller books may be bound in c-cloth, a lighter weight cloth that may or may not have an acrylic coating. The information about the volume (such as title and call number) is hot-stamped onto the spine. Bound serials are typically all bound in the same color of buckram, in order to indicate the relationship of the volumes.

== After market library binders ==
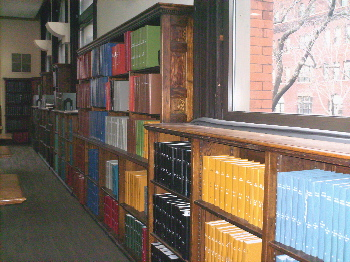
Library-bound volumes in wooden bookcases

Library binding is done at a commercial library binding company. Sending books to the library binder is a mass production process. The library will gather and set aside their volumes which they want library bound, and then box and ship these books to a library binding company. The binding company handles each volume one at a time, and then places all the items from the shipment back into boxes and sends them back to the library.

- Commercial library binding factories were first established in America and England in the early twentieth century. Since then, there have emerged several prominent library binding companies (including Dague Bookbindery, Ocker & Trapp, or Wert Bookbinders). Although they are commercial enterprises, library binders act as partners to the library world. The operations they perform on books and serials help extend the life of these materials, making them more accessible to library users. The goal should always be to do as little damage to the volume as possible. A volume should not be sent to a commercial library binder if the papers in the volume are brittle, if the volume appears to have value as an artifact, if the item can be repaired or treated in-house, or if the item needs preparatory conservation treatment.
- Library binders and libraries agree on the conditions of the services provided and the prices charged, and then sign a contract confirming these. The library binder insures against the loss of volumes and corrects any mistakes (such as the wrong color buckram cloth, or the incorrect title stamped on the spine).
- The Library Binding Institute is the main source of information and standards on library binding. In conjunction with the National Information Standards Organization, the Library Binding Institute has published standards of library binding that should be used by all binding companies. These include technical specifications (for the different methods of library binding) and material specifications (for the materials used in library binding).

== See also ==
- Bookbinding
- Book rebinding
- Prebound
- Preservation (library and archival science)
