= Ava Easton =

British medical scientist and researcher

Ava Easton MBE
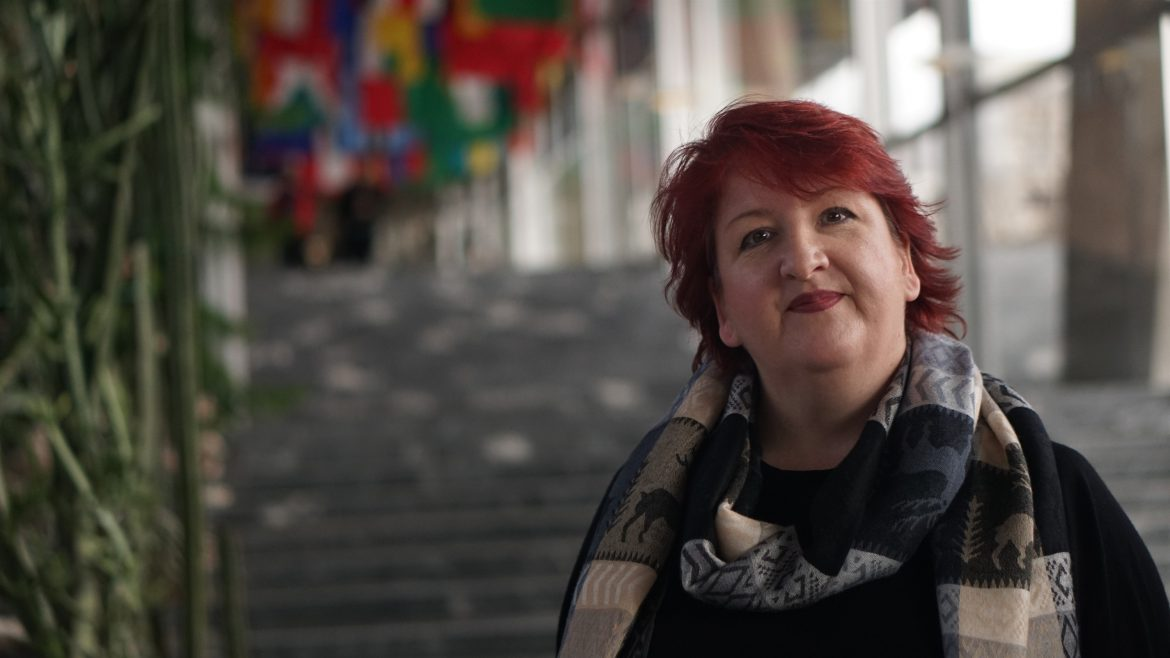
- Scientific career
- Fields: Encephalitis, Acquired Brain Injury, Narrative medicine, Global Health, Patient and Public Involvement.
- Workplaces: Encephalitis International, The University of Liverpool Department of Clinical Infection, Microbiology & Immunology
- Thesis: The Role of Written Narratives in the Recovery of People Affected by Encephalitis (2014)
- Doctoral advisor: Karl Atkin

Ava Easton MBE is a British medical scientist and researcher who specialises in encephalitis, acquired brain injury and narrative medicine, and is considered a world expert in her field of Encephalitis patient outcomes and quality of life. She is the current Chief Executive of Encephalitis International, a non-profit organisation which provides support and resources for those affected by the neurological disease of Encephalitis, and collaborates with various organisations on research into the disease.

== Education ==
Easton studied Applied Social Sciences at the Open University at the age of 33, and went on to complete a PhD with the University of York in 2014, on the role of narratives in encephalitis recovery.

== Career ==
Easton has been Chief Executive of Encephalitis International since 2011, having begun work with them in 2000, as Support Service Coordinator. She was made an Honorary Fellow in the Department of Clinical Infection, Microbiology and Immunology at the University of Liverpool in 2014.

In 2014, Easton founded World Encephalitis Day, a global awareness day to raise awareness of the condition, and provide resources and support to those affected. In 2017, the charity won a Charity Times Award for Charity of the Year with an income of less than £1 million. Also in 2014, 2017, and in 2019, Easton was awarded a Social CEO award, supported by The Guardian newspaper, marking her as one of the top 30 charity leaders on social media. In 2019, World Encephalitis Day won a Third Sector Award for Communications Campaign of the Year, and Easton was given a Charity Comms Inspiring Communicator Award.

She is a member of the Global Forum on Neurology and COVID-19, and has been Chair of the Patient, Public and Community Engagement and Involvement Panel, on the taskforce for the COVID-19 NeuroResearch Coalition, since 2020. Additionally in 2020, Easton became a member of the Steering Committee for the National Surveillance Programme on Neurological Complications of COVID-19 (COVID-CNS). She also forms part of the associated group CoroNerve, and was also appointed as the Head of Patient and Public Involvement for the programme. Further, Easton is the Chair of the Patient and Public Involvement Panel for the Brain Infections Research Group of the Global Health Network. She is an Ambassador for the European Brain Council, and a member of many other not-for-profit organisations, including the Royal Society of Medicine, the Association of Chief Executives of Voluntary Organisations, the American Academy of Neurology, and the European Academy of Neurology.

Easton also lectures at the University of Glasgow School of Medicine, and the University of Liverpool Brain Infections Group, as well as a consultant for media on encephalitis and brain injuries, most recently for the UK television program Hollyoaks on Channel 4.

Easton was awarded an MBE – Member of the Order of the British Empire by His Majesty The King in his 2026 New Year Honours List for her work and research in encephalitis.

== Research and publications ==
Easton's research is primarily focused around the neurological disease of Encephalitis, but she also works within the broader realms of neurology, the non-profit sector, healthcare outcomes and patient engagement. She has contributed extensively into work on the epidemiology of Encephalitis, including its causes, clinical manifestation and disease management. Her work particularly concerns improving patient outcomes, looking at the recovery and rehabilitation process of those with acquired brain injuries. As well as researching the physical and cognitive effects of the condition, she also explores the social impacts on survivors and their relatives and caregivers, with a focus on improving research into the disease and enhancing patients' quality of care and support available.

Her specialist field of research concerns the role that personal experience-based accounts of acquired brain injuries can play in advancing knowledge of such conditions, a concept referred to as "neuro-narratives." Easton's first book, 'Life After Encephalitis' was published by Psychology Press in 2016. The book documents the journeys of affected people, and featuring accounts from survivors and memoirs from bereaved relatives. Easton explores the ways in which their accounts can aid professionals in deepening their understanding of the disease, and be used to inform care and support provided to those affected.

Recently, she has also been involved in research across the broader field of neurology, including studies into the neurological effects of COVID-19.

Her work has been published in The Lancet, The Journal of Neurology, BMJ, Nursing Standard, Clinical Medicine the British Journal of Hospital Medicine, the Journal of Infection, Social Science & Medicine and the Journal of Neurology, Neurosurgery, and Psychiatry.
