= Benedict Michael =

British physician and neurologist

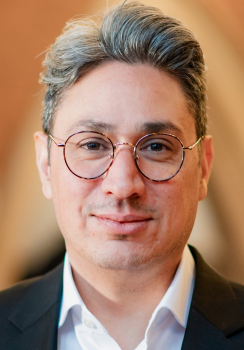
- Scientific career
- Fields: Encephalitis, Acquired Brain Injury, Narrative medicine, Global health, Patient and Public Involvement.
- Workplaces: Encephalitis International, The University of Liverpool's Department of Clinical Infection, Microbiology & Immunology
- Thesis: Detection and diagnosis of acute viral encephalitis (2014)
- Doctoral advisor: Tom Solomon and Ray Borrow

Benedict Michael is a British medical doctor, consultant neurologist, and researcher specialising in neurological infection and inflammation. He is Deputy Associate Pro Vice Chancellor for Clinical Research & Impact at the University of Liverpool, where he is also a Professor of Neurology. He is the Director of both the Brain Infection & Inflammation Group (BIIG) and the Liverpool Interdisciplinary Neuroscience Centre (LINC), and serves as Scientific Chair of the Encephalitis International. In addition, he is an Honorary Consultant Neurologist at the Walton Centre NHS Foundation Trust.

== Education ==
After graduating from the University of Liverpool with a degree in medicine and surgery, Michael undertook his PhD in Neuroimmunology in 2014. In 2018, he completed postdoctoral training at the Center for Immunology and Inflammatory Disease, Massachusetts General Hospital, and Harvard Medical School, where he developed an intravital microscopy model of viral encephalitis to image leucocyte migration into the brain in real-time. In 2022, Michael was awarded a Fellowship of the Royal College of Physicians (FRCP).

== Career ==
Michael identified the immune protein critical for recruiting a damaging immune cell into the brain. Blocking this protein reduced brain swelling and improved outcomes. As a result, he received The Liversage Award for Neurology (NENA) and the Vera Down Award for Neuroscience from the British Medical Association.

In 2013, Michael developed and evaluated a lumbar puncture pack, which was subsequently endorsed by the National Patient Safety Agency. This pack has been the central intervention in the UK since 2018 and forms the basis of an international care quality improvement program in India, Brazil and Malawi.

Michael established the National Neurological Infectious Disease Advice Service (NIDAS) in 2018, through which clinical advice on the investigation and management of patients with nervous system infections is provided. He also helped develop the Queen Square Encephalitis MDT in 2018, which provides multidisciplinary guidance on management and collects data on emergent phenotypes and treatment paradigms.

During the COVID-19 pandemic, Michael re-focused his research and established the National Surveillance Programme for Neurological Complications, CoroNerve. This was a collaboration of the UK's professional neuroscience bodies, including the Royal College of Psychiatrists and the Association of British Neurologists. It was the first nation-wide study published on the neurological impacts of COVID-19, establishing that the virus is associated with a spectrum of neurological manifestations, particularly brain inflammation. This work informed the development of the WHO Screening Checklist.

Since 2020, Michael has been a founding member and co-director of the Global Neuro Research Coalition which facilitates international collaborations on infection neurology research, including COVID-19.

Michael was on the World Health Organisation (WHO) Expert Panel on COVID-19 Neurology as part of the WHO's Brain Health Unit. He has also led the WHO Global Brain Health Clinical Exchange Platform and co-chaired the Acute Care Task Force for the Global COVID-Neuro Coalition.

In 2020, Michael was awarded the UKRI programme grant (£2.3m) to study the mechanisms of neurological complications in patients. The COVID-19 Clinical Neuroscience Study (COVID-CNS) jointly led with Professor Gerome Breen at King's College London, is part of the COVID-19 section of the NIHR BioResource.

Since 2021, Michael has been Director of The Brain Infection & Inflammation Group at the University of Liverpool, and from 2025 also Director of the Liverpool Interdisciplinary Neuroscience Centre.

Michael has developed and led the NeuroPACES training program, training over 1,300 junior doctors to pass the MRCP examination. This course has, in turn, generated both the funding and the tutors needed to run a free parallel program of clinical neurological infection training in Zambia and Mozambique. In 2019, his team received the British Medical Association Doctors as Volunteers Commendation, and they were the finalists for the Royal College of Physicians Excellence in Education Award in 2020.

Michael is the Chair Scientific Advisory Panel of the Encephalitis International (recipient of the Charity Times Award, 2019) and an expert advisor for the Meningitis Research Foundation, both of which support affected individuals while promoting globally focused prospective research funding.

Michael was a guest editor on the UK television program Hollyoaks on Channel 4.

== Research and publications ==
Michael's research focuses on the intersection of neuroscience and infection, investigating the impact of infection on the brain not just clinically but also at immunological, virological, genetic, and neuroimaging levels. He published the first nationwide clinico-epidemiologic study, establishing the UK as at the forefront of the understanding the impacts of SARS-CoV-2 on the brain. It has been recognised that viral infection of non-Central Nervous System (CNS) organs, such as the lungs, can drive a parainfectious immune- inflammatory response in the brain without CNS infection. Michael identified this phenomenon during the H1N1 pandemic; however, cases were too rare to study disease mechanisms in detail.

While working with the WHO, Michael's research directly informed the development of the WHO Screening Checklist for COVID-19 in patients presenting with neurological complications of COVID-19 and the WHO Scientific Brief on COVID-19 neurology.

Michael's work has been published in The Lancet, Brain Communications, PLOS One, Journal of the Neurological Sciences, Journal of Neurology, Neurosurgery, and Psychiatry, and Journal of Neuropsychiatry and Clinical Neurosciences.
