= Roald Dahl's Marvellous Medicine =

- Author: Tom Solomon
- Language: English
- Published: 2016
- Publisher: Liverpool University Press
- Publication place: UK
- Pages: 250
- ISBN: 978-1-78138-339-1

Roald Dahl's Marvellous Medicine is a book by British professor of neurology Tom Solomon, published in 2016 by Liverpool University Press. In it is detailed the extent to which medicine affected the life of British children's writer Roald Dahl and reveals several connections between those experiences and what he wrote in his books.

Solomon was a newly qualified physician at the John Radcliffe Hospital, Oxford, in 1990 when he came to care for Dahl, then terminally ill with leukaemia. The book is based on Solomon's recollections of their conversations. In it are details of the extent to which medicine affected Dahl's life; including his involvement in developing the Wade-Dahl-Till valve to treat the hydrocephalus his son Theo suffered after a severe head injury, the death of Olivia Dahl, stroke rehabilitation, and Measles: A Dangerous Illness (1986) which he (Roald Dahl) wrote in response to ongoing cases of measles in the United Kingdom at that time despite the introduction of an effective measles vaccine. It includes how the mixed-up words of The BFG were possibly inspired by the language his first wife, Patricia Neal, used following her stroke.

A review of the book in the British Society of Literature and Science commended the book as an engaging and inspiring read that appeals to both scholars in medical humanities and general audiences. It stresses that storytelling, in all its forms, is crucial for diagnosis and fostering empathy. As in the Australasian Journal of Neuroscience it too described the writing as having a "wandering" narrative style, indicating that the timeline may be confusing for those unfamiliar with Dahl's life. The Lancet’s review noted that although many people recognised Dahl's characters like Oompa-Loompas, they were generally unaware of his contributions to medicine, and Solomon's book filled that knowledge gap.

== Publication and background ==
Roald Dahl's Marvellous Medicine, a combination of memoir and science, was published by Liverpool University Press in 2016.

British professor of neurology Tom Solomon was a newly qualified physician at the Nuffield Department of Medicine in John Radcliffe Hospital, Oxford, in 1990 when he was part of British haematologist David Weatherall's team that cared for Roald Dahl, then terminally ill with leukaemia. Roald Dahl's Marvellous Medicine is based on Solomon's recollections of their conversations that mostly took place during his night shifts, and Dahl's writings. Solomon was inspired to write the book after collaborating with Dahl's official biographer, Donald Sturrock, on a radio show about Dahl's life for the BBC's Great Lives program. He then presented a collection of his memoirs of Dahl at the Edinburgh International Science Festival in 2015.

== Content ==
The book is divided into five parts: “A Towering Giant”, “The Great Inventor”, “An Enormous Shadow”, “Gobblefunking”, and “No Book Ever Ends”. These sections encompass 17 chapters and are followed by acknowledgments, a bibliography, notes, photo credits, an index, and a list of charities that benefit from its proceeds. Eight pages of photographs of Dahl are displayed in the centre pages.

Roald Dahl's Marvellous Medicine details the extent to which medicine affected Dahl's life, including his involvement in developing the Wade-Dahl-Till valve he helped create to treat the hydrocephalus his son Theo suffered after a severe head injury, the death of Olivia Dahl, stroke rehabilitation, and Dahl's measles vaccination letter of 1986 which he wrote in response to ongoing cases of measles in the United Kingdom at that time despite the introduction of an effective measles vaccine. The book also draws connections between these events and his children’s stories, including how the mixed up words of The BFG were possibly inspired by the language his first wife, Patricia Neal, used following her stroke.

== Reviews ==
A review of the book in the British Society of Literature and Science commended the book as an engaging and inspiring read that appeals to both scholars in medical humanities and general audiences. It noted that as the narrative develops, it becomes particularly moving, highlighting the vital connection between medicine and emotion. It stresses that storytelling, in all its forms, is crucial for diagnosis and fostering empathy. However, the review also criticises the "wandering" narrative style, indicating that the timeline may be confusing for those unfamiliar with Dahl's life. Additionally, the frequent use of scientific terminology can be challenging for lay readers, though Solomon does attempt to explain the terms.

The Lancet’s review noted that although many people recognised Dahl's characters like oompa-loompas, they were generally unaware of his contributions to medicine, and Solomon's book filled that knowledge gap. A review in the Australasian Journal of Neuroscience noted the book to "include a balance of biography, memoir, and popular science. It shows a side of Roald Dahl that many of us are not aware of". It called Solomon's "wandering style" odd, though described it as an "incredible story". The Times Literary Supplement noted that the "book shows...how deeply medicine and illness permeated Dahl’s life".

== Adaptations ==
The book was adapted into a show for the Edinburgh Festival Fringe in 2017. The show, performed by Solomon, subsequently toured the UK.

== See also ==
- Gamma globulin, the medicine which would have saved Olivia Dahl.
