= World Encephalitis Day =

International awareness event

- Significance: Raising awareness of encephalitis
- Celebrations: Sharing information on encephalitis, wearing red clothing, sharing F.L.A.M.E.S. symptoms acronym
- Observances: Community gatherings, social media movements
- Date: 22 February
- Next time: 22 February 2027
- Frequency: Annual

World Encephalitis Day is held on February 22 each year and is designed to raise awareness of encephalitis, an inflammation of the brain. The global awareness day was created by the Encephalitis International in October 2013 and has been held annually ever since on the 22nd February.

== 2014 ==
The inaugural World Encephalitis Day was operated under the tagline, “Make Today your First,” and highlighted the fact that many people would hear about encephalitis for the first time when in a hospital waiting room themselves. Supporters were encouraged to share information on encephalitis to raise awareness globally.

One of those supporters was Simon Hattenstone, a survivor of encephalitis and journalist with The Guardian, who wrote: "Encephalitis is such a cruel disease because it is often misdiagnosed – even today. And that delay in diagnosis can have fatal consequences."

Encephalitis International teamed up with the Institute of Infection and Global Health at the University of Liverpool to break a world record for the “largest human image of an organ” when 687 people descended on University Square, University of Liverpool, to stand together and form the largest ever brain made out of people.

The world record attempt was choreographed by local artist Mike Badger and Daisy Solomon, the daughter of Professor Tom Solomon, the director of the institute and member of Encephalitis International's Scientific Advisory Panel.

== 2015 ==
The focus of World Encephalitis Day 2015 was to improve early diagnosis and treatment of encephalitis. Webinars hosted by leading experts in encephalitis were live streamed across five continents – each of which focused on a different form of encephalitis. Support came from Olympic swimmer Rebecca Adlington who shared her sister's story and ended with a concert featuring Britain's Got Talent finalist Aliki Chrysochou, an ambassador for the charity, who performed in the Awakenings concert at Liverpool's Everyman Theatre.

Once again, supporters of the charity share their stories to raise awareness among the public and health professionals.

== 2016 ==
To celebrate Encephalitis International's annual theme, The Year of the Narrative, World Encephalitis Day 2016 featured a short film, digital art and photography competition, inviting supporters to create a piece of artwork that showed the world “what it needs to know about encephalitis.” The winners of each category came from the U.S. and Italy and were invited to an [ exhibition] at the Saatchi Gallery in December of that year.

The charity also encouraged supporters to share their stories with the media and wear items of red clothing on February 22 and share their photos on social media using the hashtag, #RED4WED.

== 2017 ==
The fourth annual World Encephalitis Day on February 22, 2017, reached an estimated 40 million people through traditional and social media and saw more than 50 global landmarks and buildings go #RED4WED by lighting up in the colour red to celebrate The Year of Awareness.

Buildings which were illuminated included Niagara Falls, the Millennium Bridge in Gateshead, the fountains at Trafalgar Square, the Fountain of Two Rivers in Modena, Italy, the Swan Bell Tower, Perth, and Blackpool Tower.

Supporters continued the #RED4WED campaign by wearing red clothing on February 22 and sharing their photos on social media as well as their stories with the media.

== 2018 ==
World Encephalitis Day 2018 encouraged supporters to download BrainWalk, a mobile phone app, and walk digitally around the globe by completing 52.9 million steps – the distance in steps to walk the world. In total, people from 43 different countries engaged with BrainWalk and completed over 110 million steps.

== 2019 ==
World Encephalitis Day 2019 was a global event marked by significant public engagement and awareness-raising activities. Here are some key highlights:

- Global Reach: The campaign reached an estimated 50 million people in 189 countries.
- Community Events: A Big Red Bus tour in London was one of 20 global gatherings, and the BrainWalk smartphone app saw 1,089 downloads and 222 million steps walked.
- Social Media Impact: The hashtag #Red4WED was widely used on social media, with countless individuals discussing encephalitis.

Additional Notes:

- This was the sixth year of World Encephalitis Day, demonstrating growing global awareness and impact.
- The campaign's success was attributed to the widespread participation and support from individuals and communities worldwide.

== 2020 ==
World Encephalitis Day 2020 Highlights

World Encephalitis Day 2020 was a global event marked by various activities to raise awareness about the condition. Here are some of the key highlights:

=== Scientific advances ===
- Autoimmune Encephalitis Study: A £2.6 million study was launched by the University of Liverpool to investigate new treatments for autoimmune encephalitis.
- World Encephalitis Day Conference: The first-ever conference was held in Dallas, Texas, bringing together experts from around the world.

=== Awareness campaigns ===
- #RED4WED: A social media campaign encouraged participants to wear red in support of World Encephalitis Day.
- BrainWalk: Thousands of people participated in BrainWalk events across the globe, raising funds and awareness.
- Media Coverage: Encephalitis was featured in numerous news articles, radio interviews, and television segments.

=== Personal stories ===
- Survivor Stories: Individuals affected by encephalitis shared their experiences to inspire others and raise awareness.
- Celebrity Support: Celebrities and public figures used their platforms to advocate for encephalitis awareness.

=== Other notable events ===
- Expert Interviews: Encephalitis experts provided insights into different aspects of the condition.
- International Collaboration: Organizations from various countries worked together to promote encephalitis awareness.
- Community Events: Local communities held events and activities to support those affected by encephalitis.

== 2021 ==
World Encephalitis Day 2021 was a global event marked by a significant public response and numerous activities raising awareness about encephalitis. Here are some key highlights:

- Increased Public Engagement: The campaign surpassed its target of 75 landmarks illuminated red in support, reaching around 150 worldwide. Additionally, social media participation with the hashtag #Red4WED was substantial.
- Media Coverage: World Encephalitis Day received media coverage through radio interviews, a Sky Original film ("To Olivia") exploring the impact of encephalitis, and celebrity support from Hugh Bonneville.
- Community Events: Supporters organized various events, including a 12-hour gaming livestream, a concert for a recovering patient, and BrainWalk, a global walking challenge with thousands of participants.
- Patient Stories: Individuals shared their experiences with encephalitis, including Gemma's vlog and Jackie Stebbins' local television interview.
- Scientific and Educational Resources: Several resources were made available, such as a film exploring the patient journey with autoimmune encephalitis and a Spotify playlist curated for the event.

== 2022 ==
World Encephalitis Day 2022, marked on February 22nd (22/2/2022), was a successful global campaign raising awareness about the brain condition encephalitis. Here are some key highlights:

- Increased Public Engagement: The campaign saw significant participation on social media with the hashtag #Red4WED. Additionally, a new report, "Encephalitis: an in-depth review and gap analysis," was launched to improve understanding of the disease burden.
- Media Coverage: Encephalitis received media attention through interviews, podcasts, and a special Evensong at Winchester Cathedral. Celebrities like Shaun the Sheep and Rebecca Adlington also participated.
- Patient Stories: The event featured stories from individuals and families impacted by encephalitis, including a new podcast, "The Day My Brain Broke."
- Community Activities: Events included BrainWalk, a global walking challenge, and the release of support films for caregivers and siblings of encephalitis patients.
- International Reach: The campaign extended beyond traditional media, utilizing platforms like TikTok and reaching organizations in Zambia.

== 2023 ==
World Encephalitis Day 2023 marked its 10th anniversary with a successful global campaign. Key highlights included:

- Increased Public Awareness: Social media engagement with #Red4WED was significant, and landmarks worldwide were illuminated in red.
- Research and Advocacy: New research on the mental health impact of encephalitis was published and widely discussed. The Encephalitis Society also advocated for greater global recognition of the condition.
- Media Outreach: The campaign featured interviews, podcasts, and articles across various media platforms.
- Community Involvement: Supporters participated in BrainWalk, a global walking challenge, and shared their stories online.

== 2024 ==
The World Encephalitis Day Alliance Conference, held in Jacksonville, Florida, was a significant event in the global effort to raise awareness and understanding of encephalitis. Key highlights included:

- Expert Speakers: Renowned experts like Professor Sarosh Irani and Dr John Soltys shared insights into the condition.
- Survivor Stories: Encephalitis survivors shared their personal experiences, offering valuable perspectives.
- Partnership and Support: The conference was supported by organizations like the Mayo Clinic, UCB, and Arialys Therapeutics.

Daniel McCrossan, a Member of the Legislative Assembly of Northern Ireland, spoke about World Encephalitis Day to his parliamentary colleagues.

Award-winning sports broadcaster and Encephalitis International Ambassador, Karen Tighe, announced that she would be leaving ABC Australia to focus on her health. Karen, who became poorly with HSV encephalitis four years ago, was a trailblazer for female sports broadcasters during her ABC career which began in 1989.

240 landmarks in 29 countries lit up red to shine a light on encephalitis for World Encephalitis Day

== 2025 ==
- Global Awareness Campaign: Encephalitis International continues its efforts to engage the World Health Organization (WHO) to support their work. Coinciding with World Encephalitis Day 2025, the WHO published a technical brief on encephalitis to engage policymakers and public health officials.
- Fundraising Initiatives: The World Encephalitis Day Fund aims to raise £50,000 by February 22, 2025, to support awareness, research, and global support initiatives. In 2024, fundraisers raised nearly £10,000 through various activities such as office bake sales and team challenges.
  1. Red4WED Campaign: Supporters are encouraged to wear red on February 22nd and share their photos or videos on social media using the hashtag #Red4WED. This campaign aims to spread awareness and show solidarity with those affected by encephalitis.
- Landmark Illumination: On February 22, 2025, landmarks around the world will be illuminated in red to mark World Encephalitis Day. In 2024, 249 landmarks and buildings across 29 countries participated in this initiative, including Niagara Falls, The Lotus Tower in Sri Lanka, and Kings Cross Station in London.

== 2026 ==
- Encephalitis International launch F.L.A.M.E.S. a symptoms-based acronym, like Act FAST for stroke, designed to promote greater awareness of key signs of the condition.
- A global PR and press campaign, with celebrity and community case studies achieves 567 pieces of coverage with an estimated 21.6 million views and 89.5k engagements.
- Further advertisement of FLAMES is secured via 884 billboards in 4 countries in partnership with JC Decaux, Lamar Advertising and IDS Media with a gift in kind value of £300k and an estimated impressions of 72.5 million.
