= Anita Zaidi =

Pakistani physician

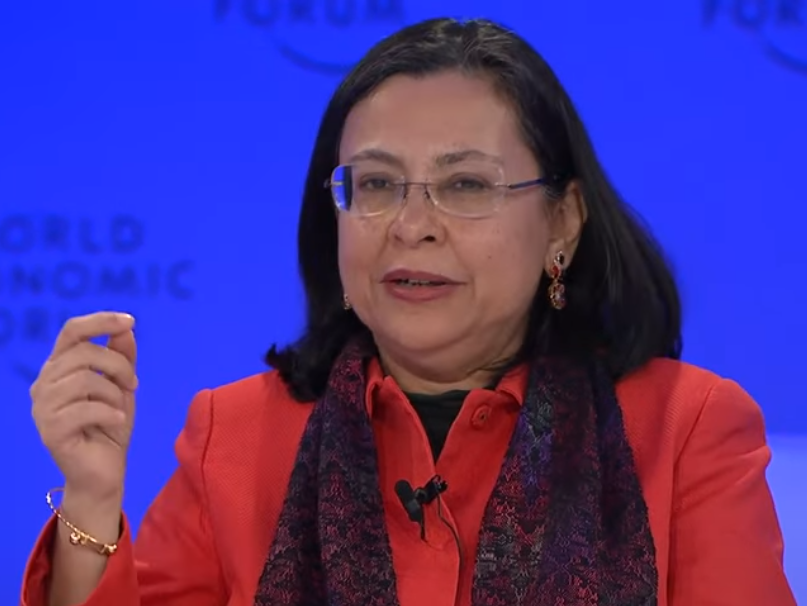
- At the 2024 World Economic Forum
- Born: 1964 (age 61–62); United Kingdom
- Education: Aga Khan University; Harvard University
- Scientific career
- Workplaces: Aga Khan University; Bill & Melinda Gates Foundation

Anita Kaniz Mehdi Zaidi (born 1964) is a Pakistani physician. She is the President of the Gender Equality Division and Director of Vaccine Development, Global Health Surveillance, Diarrhea and Enteric Diseases at the Bill & Melinda Gates Foundation. She has previously served as Professor of Paediatrics and Child Health at the Aga Khan University.

== Early life and education ==
Zaidi was born in the United Kingdom. Her mother is a paediatrician and her father was an anesthesiologist. Her father was appointed the national physician of the Pakistan men's national field hockey team, and Zaidi would often accompany him on their tours. Whilst visiting a cousin in the United Kingdom Zaidi became interested in microbiology and applied to work in a clinical commercial laboratory.

Zaidi eventually studied medicine at Aga Khan University and earned her Bachelor of Medicine, Bachelor of Surgery in 1988. During her degree she enjoyed her courses in community health and spent time working in the Pakistan’s urban squatter settlements (katchi abadis). She has spoken about Claire Panosian Dunavan, a visiting professor from University of California, Los Angeles, being one of her inspirations. Zaidi was one of the first cohorts of medical students to graduate Aga Khan and was the inaugural winner of the Best Medical Graduate Award.

After graduating Zaidi worked on a United States Agency for International Development program in remote northern Pakistani territories (now Gilgit-Baltistan), which inspired her to dedicate her career to global public health. Her project involved establishing a community surveillance program for diarrhoeal disease and to identify what infrastructure the Aga Khan Health Services needs to implement to improve healthcare. She completed her residency training in paediatrics at Duke University and also undertook medical microbiology at Duke University. She took specialist training in paediatric infectious diseases at Boston Children's Hospital. Zaidi earned a Masters in Tropical Public Health at the Harvard T.H. Chan School of Public Health in 1999.

== Research and career ==
In 2002, after completing her specialist training, Zaidi returned to Pakistan. She was one of the youngest faculty members to be promoted to full professor when she became chair of the Department of Paediatrics and Child Health at Aga Khan University. In 2011 she was awarded an endowed position; the Ruby and Karim Bahudar Ali Jessani Professor and Chair. At Aga Khan University Zaidi established a state-of-the-art laboratory that investigates paediatric infectious diseases. Zaidi is the only woman from the Global South to contribute a chapter to Nelson Textbook of Paediatrics.

In 2010 Zaidi was awarded the Vincenzo Marcolongo Memorial Lectureship. She was the first recipient of the Caplow's Children's Prize for her work supporting poverty-stricken communities in Karachi in 2013. She used the prize to reduce neonatal deaths in Rehri Goth. Her efforts focussed on eliminating malnutrition, improving access to healthcare and vaccinations and training for community health professionals. She developed programs that supported mother and child health before, during and after children were born. Zaidi estimated that the program would reduce child mortality by 65%, saving the lives of 200 children over two years.

In 2014 Zaidi was shortlisted for physician of the year by Medscape.

Also in 2014, Zaidi joined the Bill & Melinda Gates Foundation and became the director of the Vaccine Development, Surveillance, and Enteric and Diarrhoea Diseases programs and co-director of the Maternal, Newborn & Child Health Discovery & Tools programs. In this capacity Zaidi supports the development of new vaccinations to protect communities around the world.

In June 2020 the Gates Foundation announced a new division dedicated to gender equality, with Zaidi being its first president. As of March 2021, Zaidi still also directs Vaccine Development, Surveillance, Diarrhea and Enteric Diseases at the Foundation.

Zaidi uses social media to share her work in public health using the Twitter handle @AnitaEDD. She has written for The Conversation, the Skoll Foundation, Project Syndicate and HuffPost.

== Other activities ==
- Coalition for Epidemic Preparedness Innovations (CEPI), Member of the Board (since 2022)
- Co-Impact, Member of the Gender Fund Advisory Board
- WomenLift Health, Member of the Global Advisory Board

== Selected publications ==
Her publications include;

- Zaidi, Anita K. M. (1 April 2005). "Hospital-acquired neonatal infections in developing countries". The Lancet. 365 (9465): 1175–1188. doi:10.1016/S0140-6736(05)71881-X. PMID 15794973. S2CID 22331781.
- Zaidi, Anita K. M. (2009). "Pathogens Associated with Sepsis in Newborns and Young Infants in Developing Countries". The Pediatric Infectious Disease Journal. 28 (1 Suppl): S10–S18. doi:10.1097/INF.0b013e3181958769. PMID 19106757. S2CID 24956929.
- Zaidi, Anita K. M. (2004). "Burden of infectious diseases in South Asia". British Medical Journal. 328 (7443): 811–815. doi:10.1136/bmj.328.7443.811. PMC 383379. PMID 15070639.

== Recognition ==
- 2021 – Jimmy and Rosalynn Cater Humanitarian Award, presented by the National Foundation for Infectious Diseases

== Personal life ==
Zaidi is married to Prof. Dr. Saad Shafqat, Professor of Neurology at Agha Khan, sharing a daughter and a son together.
