= Liverpool Neurological Infectious Diseases Course =

Educational course in Liverpool, England

The Liverpool Neurological Infectious Diseases Course (or NeuroID) is an annual two-day course aimed at medical professionals and students with an interest in neurological infectious diseases. The course is organised by the Liverpool Brain Infections Group, a division of the Institute of Infection and Global Health at the University of Liverpool, in collaboration with the Walton Centre NHS Foundation Trust, Alder Hey Children's NHS Trust, Royal Liverpool University Hospital, and Liverpool School of Tropical Medicine, and is chaired by the neurologist Tom Solomon. It takes place during May at the historic Liverpool Medical Institution, in Liverpool, UK. A variety of both national and international speakers contribute to a programme which covers clinical aspects of common central nervous system infections such as meningitis and encephalitis, as well as rarer neurological infections and talks on recent advances in related research. The course is accredited by the UK Royal College of Physicians, and attracts delegates from many countries worldwide.

== Richard T. Johnson Lectures ==
The Richard T. Johnson lecture (named for the physician and researcher in neurological infection) is given by an expert in a chosen subfield and focuses on research. Previous speakers include:

2015: Professor Avindra Nath, National Institute of Neurological Disorders and Stroke, USA – Diagnostic and therapeutic challenges in neurological infections

2014: Professor Israel Steiner, Rabin Medical Center, Pentah Tikva, Israel – Para-infectious disorders of the nervous system

2013: Professor Elizabeth Molyneux, OBE and Professor Malcolm Molyneux, OBE, Malawi-Liverpool Wellcome Trust Clinical Research Programme– CNS infections in Malawian children

2012: Professor Scott Letendre, University of California, San Diego, USA – Neurocognitive complications of HIV

2011: Professor Angela Vincent, University of Oxford, UK – Antibody-mediated encephalitis

2010: Professor Richard Whitley, University of Alabama, USA – Viral encephalitis; advances and new frontiers

2009: Professor Mike Levin, Imperial College, London – Can better understanding of inflammatory mechanisms lead to improved outcome in bacterial meningitis?

2008: Dr Susan O'Connell, Southampton General Hospital, UK – Lyme neuroborreliosis – the greatest controversy of the day

2007: Professor Peter Kennedy, University of Glasgow, UK – Varicella Zoster Virus infections of the nervous system

== Reviews ==
The course has been reviewed positively by the British Medical Journal and in Advances in Clinical Neuroscience and Rehabilitation.

== See also ==
- Liverpool Medical Institution
