= Simon Hattenstone =

British journalist and writer (born 1962)

- Born: 29 December 1962 (age 63); Salford, England
- Education: Leeds University
- Occupations: Journalist and writer
- Employer: The Guardian

Simon Hattenstone (born 29 December 1962) is a British journalist and writer. He is a features writer and interviewer for The Guardian. He has also written or ghost-written a number of biographical books.

== Life ==
Hattenstone grew up in a Jewish family. He was severely ill with encephalitis for three years as a child, and became an ambassador for The Encephalitis Society. He reported lifelong changes as an aftermath of his illness.

He studied English at Leeds University and trained to be a teacher, then moved to London to work as a journalist. On The Guardian, he wrote a sports column for three years, in which he described the vicissitudes of being a die-hard Manchester City supporter long before it was revived after being acquired by the wealthy ruling family of Abu Dhabi. He also became assistant arts editor and film editor.

== Works ==
=== Journalism ===
Hattenstone is among the few journalists to have interviewed the anonymous graffiti artist Banksy. People he has interviewed include George Michael, Paul McCartney, Dolly Parton, Debbie McGee, Tom Jones, Stevie Wonder, Serena Williams, Katie Price, Desmond Tutu, and Penélope Cruz. Hattenstone's phone interview of Judi Dench was deemed an example of entertaining feature writing, yielding "an unconventional but, ultimately, satisfying profile". He also writes about crime and justice, and has covered many miscarriages of justice. He was highly commended in the Interviewer of the Year category in The Press Awards for 2014.

=== Other works ===
Books by Hattenstone include Out of It: The Story of a Boy who Went to Bed with a Headache and Woke Up Three Years Later, about his childhood illness, and The Best of Times, about the lives of members of England's 1966 football world cup team. He has ghost-written books for the snooker player Ronnie O'Sullivan and for Duwayne Brooks, who was attacked with Stephen Lawrence on the night Lawrence was murdered.

=== Film and television ===
Hattenstone co-wrote the television documentary series Brits Abroad (2000).

== Personal life ==
In 2020, Hattenstone entered a civil partnership with Diane Taylor, after more than 30 years living together; they have two daughters.
