= Tom Solomon (neurologist) =

English neurologist (born 1966)

Tom Solomon CBE
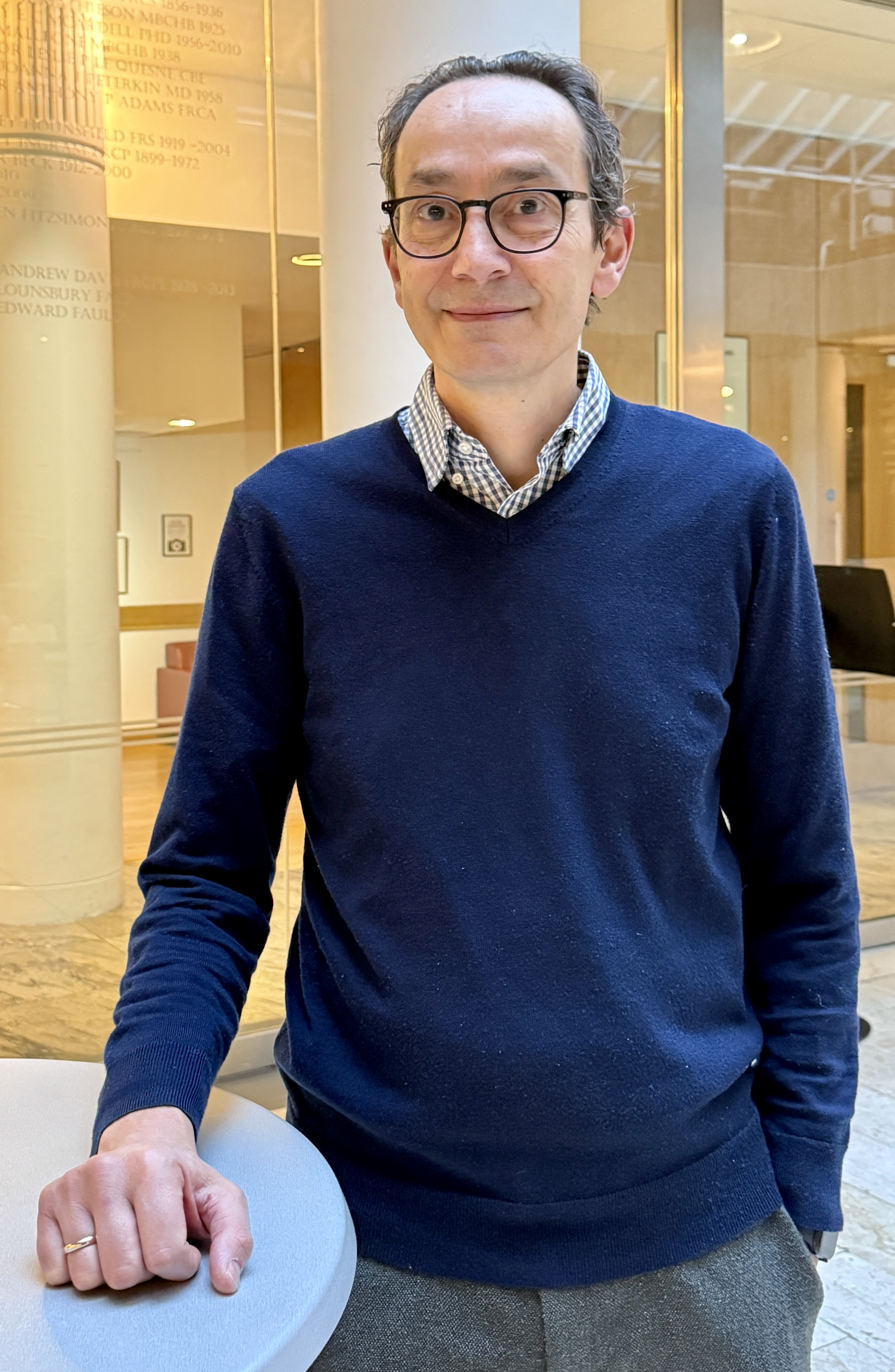
- Tom Solomon, Royal Society of Medicine (2026)
- Born: c. 1966
- Occupation: Neurologist
- Known for: Liverpool Neurological Infectious Diseases Course
- Awards: Vincenzo Marcolongo Memorial Lectureship (2003); Moxon Medal (2015)

Academic background
- Education: Manchester Grammar School; John Radcliffe Hospital
- Alma mater: Wadham College, Oxford
- Thesis: "Central Nervous System Infections in Vietnam" (2001)
- Doctoral advisors: Nicholas White; John Newsom-Davis
- Other advisor: David Weatherall

Academic work
- Institutions: University of Oxford; John Radcliffe Hospital; Oxford University Clinical Research Unit, Vietnam; University of Liverpool; University of Texas Medical Branch; Walton Centre NHS Foundation Trust, Liverpool; Institute of Infection, Veterinary and Ecological Sciences
- Main interests: Neurology; Infectious diseases; Emerging infectious diseases; Global health
- Notable works: Roald Dahl's Marvellous Medicine (2016)
- Website: Official website

Thomas Solomon CBE (born c. 1966) is professor of neurology at the University of Liverpool, and director of both the Pandemic Institute and of the National Institute for Health and Care Research (NIHR) Health Protection Research Unit in Emerging and Zoonotic Infections (HPRU EZI), which led the UK response to Ebola, Zika virus disease, and the COVID-19 pandemic. He is vice president (international) of the Academy of Medical Sciences, and academic vice president at the Royal College of Physicians (RCP) of London. He leads the Liverpool Brain Infections Group, which studies infections in the brain, particularly Japanese encephalitis, enterovirus 71 and other types of meningitis.

Solomon was raised in Manchester before being accepted to study medicine at Wadham College, Oxford, followed by training at the John Radcliffe Hospital. As a house officer in 1990, he provided care for the children's author Roald Dahl, who had at the time been diagnosed with leukaemia. Their conversations became the foundation of Solomon's 2016 book titled Roald Dahl's Marvellous Medicine, in which he explores the impact of medicine on Dahl's life.

Solomon has set two Guinness World Records, one for running the fastest marathon dressed as a doctor in 2010, and another for forming a human model of the brain in 2016. His science communication work as the "Running Mad Professor" raises awareness of emerging brain infections, as well as helping raise funds for charity. In 2021 he received a Commander of the Order of the British Empire (CBE) for his contributions to the study of emerging viruses.

== Early life and education ==
Tom Solomon grew up in Manchester as one of five children, with his father, an accountant, and his mother, a teacher. Between 1976 and 1984 he attended Manchester Grammar School, and subsequently gained a place at Wadham College, Oxford, to study medicine. During his clinical years at the John Radcliffe Hospital, he went on elective to Mozambique, where he studied malaria.

== Early career ==
In 1990, Solomon was appointed house officer to David Weatherall, haematologist in the Nuffield Department of Medicine at the John Radcliffe. There, while writing up his research on malaria, during his one in three nights on-call, he met the children's author Roald Dahl, who had at the time been diagnosed with leukaemia, was terminally ill, and came to be under the care of Weatherall's team. Their conversions would one day become the foundation of Solomon's book titled Roald Dahl's Marvellous Medicine.

In his late 20s, Solomon was awarded a Wellcome Trust scholarship to the Oxford University Clinical Research Unit in Vietnam (1994-1997), where he researched and contributed to efforts concerning the country's Japanese encephalitis epidemic. There, he completed his PhD on central nervous system infections, under the supervision of Nicholas White. His research demonstrated that the Japanese encephalitis virus can lead to an illness that causes leg paralysis, which may be mistakenly diagnosed as polio.

In 1998, Solomon became clinical lecturer in neurological science at the University of Liverpool with honorary positions in the Department of Medical Microbiology and at the Liverpool School of Tropical Medicine. With the support of a Wellcome Trust Career Development Fellowship (1998–2004), he trained in arbovirology (the study of viruses transmitted by arthropods, such as mosquitoes) at the University of Texas Medical Branch, Galveston, Texas, with virologist Alan D. T. Barrett. On the origin and evolution of Japanese encephalitis, his team examined genetic sequencing data of virus isolates, finding that all genotypes of the Japanese encephalitis virus are present in the Indonesia-Malaysia region, whereas only recently evolved genotypes circulate elsewhere.

== Later career ==
In 2000 Solomon highlighted the importance of dengue, a mosquito-borne virus, as a cause of neurological disease. In 2005 he was appointed clinical senior lecturer in neurological science at the University of Liverpool and was awarded a UK Medical Research Council Senior Clinical Fellowship to continue his studies on brain infections. His research has also included an investigation that found that some children in Malawi, a country where malaria is endemic, who had died of malaria were actually infected with the rabies virus.

In 2007 Solomon was appointed professor of neurological science. In the same year he founded the annual Liverpool Neurological Infectious Diseases Course. From 2010 to 2017 he was director of the Institute of Infection and Global Health. In 2014 he was appointed director of the UK Government's National Institute for Health Research Health Protection Research Unit in Emerging and Zoonotic Infections. This unit works on a number of emerging infections, including the Ebola, Zika virus disease, and COVID-19. Other infections he has researched include enterovirus 71, which causes hand foot and mouth disease and encephalitis. Alongside his colleagues in Liverpool, he had a key role in the national response to the COVID-19 pandemic. In 2022 Solomon was appointed director of the Pandemic Institute.

In 2019 he was elected to the RCP council. Three years later he was appointed a RCP censor. In 2024, Solomon was elected as its academic vice president. He was a candidate in the presidential election in 2025. During the campaign, Solomon received a formal warning in March 2025 from the RCP for multiple breaches of its election code of practice by "canvassing via the media" and "publishing embargoed election materials prior to publishing by the RCP". He finished second to Mumtaz Patel in the election with 1,557 votes.

== Science communication and public engagement ==
As the "Running Mad Professor" he has increased awareness of encephalitis, whilst also helping to raise funds for the Encephalitis Society, for which he Chairs the Professional Advisory Panel. At the 2010 London Marathon he set a Guinness World Record for the fastest marathon dressed as a doctor. In 2012 he was an Olympic torch bearer. He has given numerous public lectures, including the Shrewsbury School Scholars Day Lecture, 2012, and the Emry's Jones Lecture at Merchant Taylors' School. To increase public and patient involvement in the Institute of Infection and Global Health, he established the Saturday Science Programme at World Museum Liverpool.

At TEDx Liverpool 2014, he gave a talk on "Sex, Drugs and Emerging Viruses", appearing alongside Beermat Entrepreneur Mike Southon, and educationalist Sir Ken Robinson. To mark the first World Encephalitis Day, creation of the Encephalitis Society, he initiated the "World's Biggest Brain", winning a Guinness World Record for the largest human image of an organ in 2016.

Solomon also writes for The Guardian and The Independent newspapers and The Conversation on issues relating to biomedical science, particularly on emerging infections, neuroscience, and women in science, and appears on television and radio. He discussed the threat to the UK of Ebola virus with Andrew Neal on BBC Television's The Sunday Politics. On BBC Radio 4's Great Lives he discussed the children's author Roald Dahl, whose fascination with medical science impacted both on his life and his writing.

== Roald Dahl ==
Solomon's conversions with Dahl during his early years as a newly qualified physician formed the basis of his book Roald Dahl's Marvellous Medicine. It was published in 2016 and explores the impact of medicine on Dahl's life, including his role in developing the Wade-Dahl-Till valve to treat his son Theo's hydrocephalus after a serious head injury. It also addresses the death of his daughter Olivia, his work in stroke rehabilitation following his first wife Patricia Neal's illness, and his 1986 open letter advocating for measles vaccination amid UK outbreaks. The book further connects these experiences to his children's stories, suggesting that The BFG's distinctive speech patterns may have been influenced by Neal's post-stroke language.

== Awards and honours ==
In 2003, Solomon received the Vincenzo Marcolongo Memorial Lectureship from the International Association for Medical Assistance to Travellers, and delivered at the annual meeting of the American Society of Tropical Medicine and Hygiene. In 2015 he garnered the RCP's Moxon Medal, for "outstanding observation and research in clinical medicine".

Solomon was appointed Commander of the Order of the British Empire (CBE) in the 2021 Birthday Honours for services to neurological and emerging infections research. In 2021 he was made a Fellow of the Academy of Medical Sciences. Later that year he was elected as its vice president (international).

== Selected publications ==
=== Articles ===
- Solomon, Tom; Dung, Nguyen Minh; Vaughn, David W.; Kneen, Rachel; Thao, Le Thi Thu; Raengsakulrach, Boonyos; Loan, Ha Thi; Day, Nicholas PJ; Farrar, Jeremy; Myint, Khin SA; Warrell, Mary J.; James, William S.; Nisalak, Amanda; White, Nicholas J. (25 March 2000). "Neurological manifestations of dengue infection". The Lancet. 355 (9209): 1053–1059. doi:10.1016/S0140-6736(00)02036-5. ISSN 0140-6736. PMID 10744091. (Co-author)
- Solomon, Tom; Ni, Haolin; Beasley, David W. C.; Ekkelenkamp, Miquel; Cardosa, Mary Jane; Barrett, Alan D. T. (March 2003). "Origin and evolution of Japanese encephalitis virus in southeast Asia". Journal of Virology. 77 (5): 3091–3098. doi:10.1128/jvi.77.5.3091-3098.2003. ISSN 0022-538X. PMC 149749. PMID 12584335. (Co-author)
- Solomon, Tom; Lewthwaite, Penny; Perera, David; Cardosa, Mary Jane; McMinn, Peter; Ooi, Mong How (1 November 2010). "Virology, epidemiology, pathogenesis, and control of enterovirus 71". The Lancet Infectious Diseases. 10 (11): 778–790. doi:10.1016/S1473-3099(10)70194-8. ISSN 1473-3099. PMID 20961813.(Co-author)
- Granerod, Julia; Ambrose, Helen E.; Davies, Nicholas WS; Clewley, Jonathan P.; Walsh, Amanda L.; Morgan, Dilys; Cunningham, Richard; Zuckerman, Mark; Mutton, Ken J.; Solomon, Tom; Ward, Katherine N.; Lunn, Michael PT; Irani, Sarosh R.; Vincent, Angela; Brown, David WG; Crowcroft, Natasha S.; UK Health Protection Agency (HPA) Aetiology of Encephalitis Study Group (December 2010). "Causes of encephalitis and differences in their clinical presentations in England: a multicentre, population-based prospective study". The Lancet. Infectious Diseases. 10 (12): 835–844. doi:10.1016/S1473-3099(10)70222-X. ISSN 1474-4457. PMID 20952256. (Co-author)
- Ellul, Mark A.; Benjamin, Laura; Singh, Bhagteshwar; Lant, Suzannah; Michael, Benedict Daniel; Easton, Ava; Kneen, Rachel; Defres, Sylviane; Sejvar, Jim; Solomon, Tom (1 September 2020). "Neurological associations of COVID-19". The Lancet Neurology. 19 (9): 767–783. doi:10.1016/S1474-4422(20)30221-0. ISSN 1474-4422. PMC 7332267. PMID 32622375. (Co-author)
- Singh, Bhagteshwar; et al. (10 March 2025). "A multifaceted intervention to improve diagnosis and early management of hospitalised patients with suspected acute brain infections in Brazil, India, and Malawi: an international multicentre intervention study". Lancet. 405 (10483): S0140–6736(25)00263–6. doi:10.1016/S0140-6736(25)00263-6. ISSN 1474-547X. PMC 7618301. PMID 40081400. (Co-author)fdeng

=== Books ===
- Roald Dahl's Marvellous Medicine. Liverpool University Press. 2016. ISBN 978-1-78138-339-1.
