= Thiravat Hemachudha =

Thai neurologist

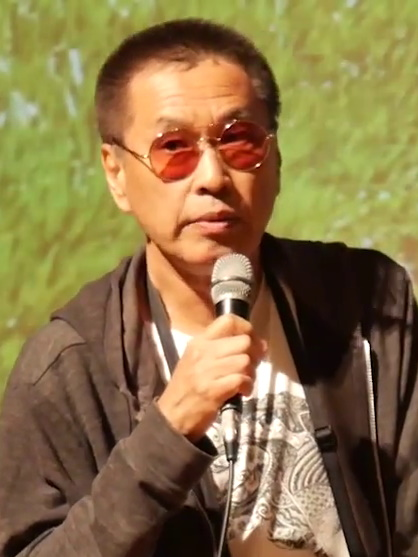
- Thiravat in 2018
- Born: 1954 (age 71–72)
- Occupation: Neurologist
- Known for: Rabies research

Thiravat Hemachudha (Thai: ธีระวัฒน์ เหมะจุฑา, RTGS: Thirawat Hemachutha; born 1954) is a Thai neurologist, mainly recognized as an expert on rabies. He is a professor at the Faculty of Medicine, Chulalongkorn University and King Chulalongkorn Memorial Hospital, and is a member of the WHO Expert Advisory Panel on Rabies.

Thirawat graduated in medicine and completed internal medicine and neurology training at Chulalongkorn University, and did a fellowship at the Johns Hopkins School of Medicine. He returned to teach at Chulalongkorn in 1982, where he has held professorship since 1989. He has done research on rabies since 1984, and is noted for his work on rabies post-exposure prophylaxis regimens and pathophysiology. Lately, he has also publicly advocated for the banning of several chemical herbicides, as well as for the legalization of medical cannabis.

In 2018 he was awarded the Vincenzo Marcolongo Memorial Lectureship.
