= Encephalitis International =

UK disability organization

- Formation: 1994
- Type: Not-for-profit organisation
- Registration no.: Charity no: 1087843
- Location: Malton, United Kingdom
- Region served: Area served: worldwide
- Key people: Dr Ava Easton (Chief Executive) Phillippa Chapman (Deputy Chief Executive) Prof Tom Solomon (President)
- Revenue: £1,308,233
- Staff: 15
- Volunteers: 68
- Website: www.encephalitis.info

Encephalitis International (formerly the Encephalitis Society) is a not-for-profit organisation providing information and support for those affected by encephalitis, an inflammation of the brain, raising awareness and funding and collaborating on research on the condition.

The organisation provides support and opportunities to connect for individuals and families whose lives have been impacted by encephalitis. It funds, collaborates, and promotes research into all aspects of this condition. It also raises awareness of encephalitis among the public and medical and health professionals.

The chief executive is Dr Ava Easton who is also a researcher (Honorary Fellow in the Department of Clinical Infection, Microbiology and Immunology, University of Liverpool) and global expert on encephalitis patient outcomes and quality of life.

== Work ==
Encephalitis International provides support and information to people affected by encephalitis directly or indirectly, raises awareness of encephalitis, and drives research into the neurological condition by working with a variety of professionals and organisations from health, social care, and education globally.

=== Support and information ===
Encephalitis International provides support and information to people affected directly or indirectly by encephalitis, and to a variety of professionals and organisations from health, social care and education globally. The charity holds virtual webinars and support groups, face-to-face events, and weekends for children and their families. It also developed a global volunteer scheme called Team Encephalitis.

Encephalitis International has a resource library on paper and online, and provides information in digital formats: e-learning, animations and videos. In 2025 their website was viewed 527,122 times, and 1,287 people contacted their support services.

World Encephalitis Day was created by the charity in 2014, and occurs yearly on 22 February.

=== Research ===
Encephalitis International funds and collaborates on research into encephalitis and its consequences. It holds the go-to international annual conference for professionals on the condition, last year welcoming 531 delegates from 80 countries.

It works in conjunction with several universities to develop research, including Oxford University, University of Liverpool, and University College London (UCL) and King's College London.

The charity awards annual grant funding through seed funding, PhD and Fellowships. They also give travel bursaries to medical students and junior physicians in low-to-middle income countries to attend the Encephalitis Conference.

It works in partnership with other neurological charities and health organisations at national and international level, to support rapid diagnosis and access to services.

Its Scientific Advisory Panel consists of experts in encephalitis, including as of 2026 Tom Solomon, Angela Vincent, and Sarosh R Irani, B.M., B.Ch., D.Phil. The vice chair of the panel is Assoc. Prof Kiran Thakur, and the chair is Prof. Benedict Michael.

In February 2025 the World Health Organization published a Technical Brief on encephalitis, describing the condition as a ''growing global threat'' and an ''urgent public health priority''. Funded and launched by Encephalitis International, this brief followed year's of advocacy by the charity, and now aims to reshape the global landscape of encephalitis awareness, diagnosis, treatment and patient care.

=== Fundraising ===
Encephalitis International is supported by a range of individual, company and grant-making supporters. Individual supporters are encouraged to take part in a range of physical, digital and other challenges through the charity's Fundraise For Us webpages as well as helping support the charity financially through making one-off, regular and appeal based donations.

In 2021, the Changemakers Collaborative was launched to bring together individuals and organisations positioned to help further fund the charity's work.

In 2023, Encephalitis International's "Don't Delay: Give Today" appeal raised over £43,000 from supporters across the world towards beginning the design and implementation of training opportunities for medical professionals globally. In the same year the charity launched its 22 Club, inviting supporters from the business world to join this networking club, with funds raised going towards the delivery of World Encephalitis Day.

== Awards ==
Encephalitis International has won numerous awards. In January 2024 the charity re-branded from The Encephalitis Society to Encephalitis International; rewards prior to this date are listed with its previous name. Awards include:

- Silver Chartered Institute of Public Relations (CIPR) Award for World Encephalitis Day 2014
- BMA Patient Information Awards 2016 – Highly Commended
- 2017 Charity Times' Charity of the Year; with an income less than £1 million
- Charity Times' Fundraising Technology of the Year (2018)
- Best use of Digital, Digital Impact Awards (2018)
- Charity Comms' Inspiring Communicator Award (2019) for Dr Ava Easton
- Social CEO of the Year Award in The Social CEO Awards (2019) for Dr Ava Easton
- Celebrity Charity Champion and Communications Campaign of the Year in the Third Sector Awards (2019)
- Best use of digital by a charity, NGO or NFP (bronze) in the 2021 Digital Impact Awards
- Nominated for Fundraising Team of The Year in the Third Sector Awards (2022)
- Fundraising Team of the Year at the 2022 Charity Times awards
- Dr Ava Easton was Highly Commended for Charity Leader of the Year at the 2022 Charity Times Awards.
- Best use of online video - Highly Commended - at the 2024 European Digital Impact Awards.
