= Vincenzo Marcolongo =

Italian physician

Vincenzo Marcolongo (died 1988) was an Italian physician who in 1960 recognised a need for physicians who could specialise in travel medicine and so founded the International Association for Medical Assistance to Travellers (IAMAT). He is named for an annual lectureship held at the American Society of Tropical Medicine and Hygiene.
