= Measles: A Dangerous Illness =

1986 open letter by Roald Dahl

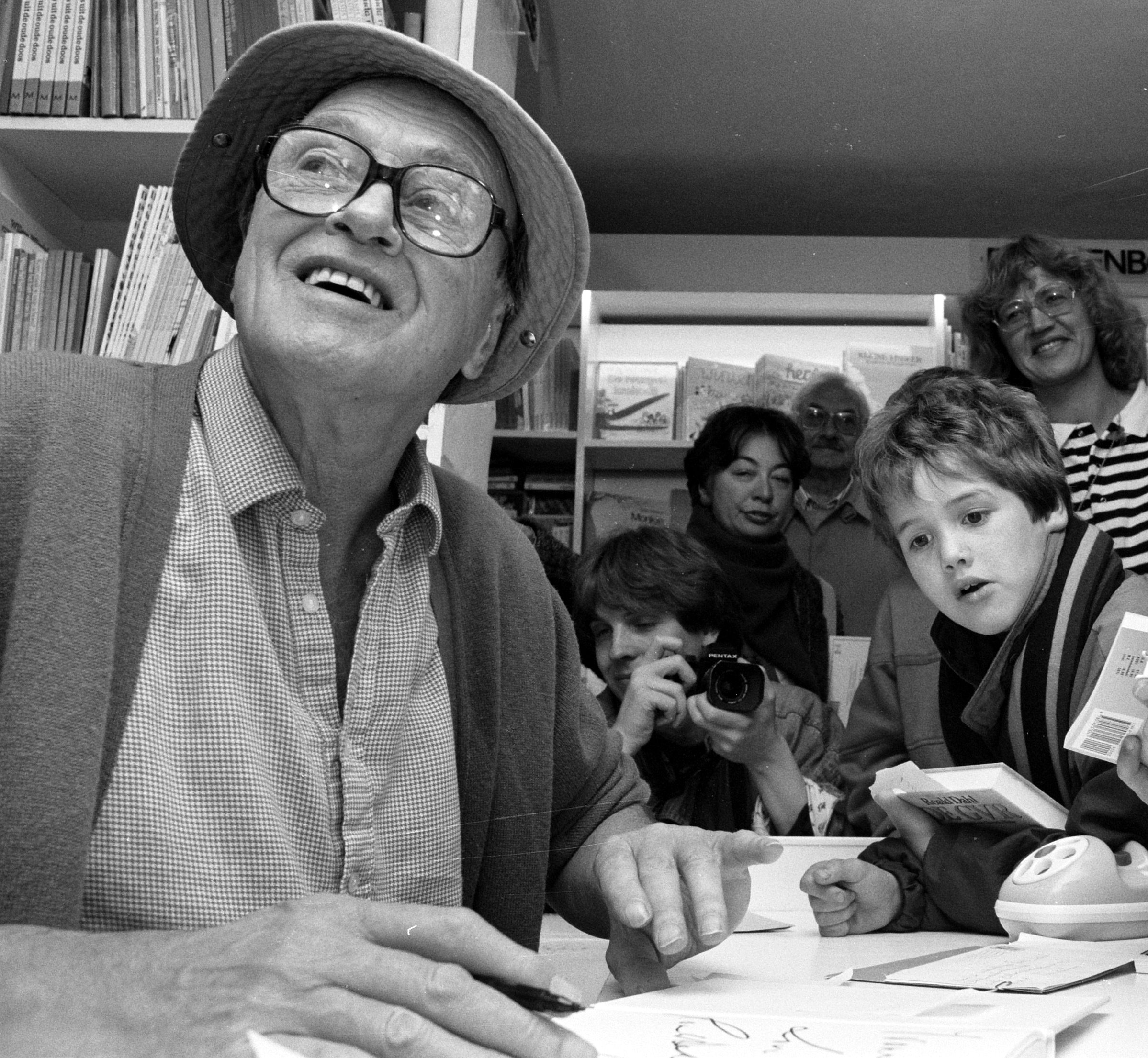
- Roald Dahl in 1988
- Created: 1986
- Presented: July 1986
- Commissioned by: Sandwell health authority
- Author: Roald Dahl
- Purpose: Promotion of vaccination against measles

"Measles: A Dangerous Illness" is an open letter written by the children's writer Roald Dahl in 1986 in response to ongoing cases of measles in the United Kingdom at that time despite the introduction of an effective measles vaccine in 1968.

Dahl, whose daughter Olivia died in 1962 from measles, told his doctor Tom Solomon that the figures relating to continued cases of measles in the UK bothered him. After listening to a physician discuss vaccine hesitancy among parents on the radio in 1985, Dahl composed a letter to encourage parents to get their children vaccinated. It went through several drafts before it was issued in 1986. He addressed it to children and aimed it at their parents. The letter was distributed to Sandwell's family doctors, health visitors, school nurses, and parents of small children before being issued to other areas in the UK.

Two years later, the letter was republished, and it has continued to be quoted after subsequent measles outbreaks. The narrative in his letter reminds of the power of storytelling in tackling vaccine hesitancy and refusal.

== Background ==
By the late 1980s, there were over 80,000 cases of measles a year in the UK despite the availability of an effective measles vaccine since 1968. (Note: The measles vaccine was introduced in the US in 1963, and in the UK in 1968. In the year before Dahl's letter, cases of measles in the UK numbered 97,408 with 11 deaths, and numbered 82,054 with 10 deaths in 1986.) Roald Dahl, the children's writer whose daughter Olivia had died in 1962 from measles, told his doctor Tom Solomon that the figures bothered him and that there was "no need for it. Why do we have so much measles in Britain, when the Americans have virtually got rid of it?" Dahl wrote his first letter to the Department of Health and Social Security in 1985. His daughter Ophelia later recalled that there was some interest from Jeffrey Archer, then Conservative Party Chairman, but a scandal put an end to that aspiration of Dahl. In December 1985, Dahl had listened to Dr Barry Smith of Sandwell Health Authority, who discussed vaccine hesitancy among parents, and the importance of the measles vaccine on Radio Four's Today programme. Dahl subsequently contacted Smith and offered to write a letter.

== The letter ==
The letter was issued in 1986, addressed to children and aimed at their parents. Despite his age at near 70 and still recovering from a recent illness, Dahl travelled to the Midlands Centre for Neurosurgery and Neurology in July to launch the measles vaccine letter. He told the press, radio and children that "I have great child power. I understand how a child's mind works - that's how I can help and influence". The words were carefully thought out, he told Solomon. He used "caught" or "got infected by" rather than "contracted", and he calculated the risks of side-effects based on information relayed by Smith. The letter was distributed to Sandwell's GPs, health visitors, school nurses and parents of small children. Other district health authorities also received the letter. Dahl put several drafts past Smith, one of which found in the Roald Dahl archives reads "please take this letter home and give it to your parents". Dahl subsequently requested Sandwell to assess the impact of the letter. Vaccination clinics were set up after school to meet the anticipated high demand.

In the letter Dahl described his experience: "Olivia, my eldest daughter, caught measles when she was seven years old. As the illness took its course, I can remember reading to her often in bed and not feeling particularly alarmed about it." She became uninterested in playing and within an hour was unconscious. "Within twelve hours she was dead" he wrote. Dahl explained that neither in 1962 nor in 1986, was there any cure for measles encephalitis, but "on the other hand, there is today something parents can do to make sure that this sort of tragedy does not happen to a child of theirs. They can insist that their child is immunised against measles." With reference to the possible serious side-effects of the vaccine, he claimed that they were so unlikely that he reckoned there was a greater chance of dying by choking on a bar of chocolate, and that they were a far lower risk than the disease itself.

Here in Britain, because so many parents refuse, either out of obstinacy or ignorance or fear, to allow their children to be immunised, we still have a hundred thousand cases of measles every year. Out of those, more than 10,000 will suffer side effects of one kind or another. At least 10,000 will develop ear or chest infections. About 20 will die. LET THAT SINK IN. Every year around 20 children will die in Britain from measles. So what about the risks that your children will run from being immunised? They are almost non-existent. Listen to this. In a district of around 300,000 people, there will be only one child every 250 years who will develop serious side effects from measles immunisation! That is about a million to one chance. I should think there would be more chance of your child choking to death on a chocolate bar than of becoming seriously ill from a measles immunisation. (Dahl 1986)

The letter was a direct appeal to children of school age to "beg their parents to arrange for them to have one [the measles vaccine] as soon as possible". Dahl stated that "it really is almost a crime to allow your child to go unimmunized." At the end of the letter, Dahl encouraged the reader to seek his daughter's name in the dedication of his books The BFG and James and the Giant Peach.

Between January and June 1986, 589 measles notifications were reported in North East Essex Health District. In response, Dahl's letter was posted out with a questionnaire to over 1,200 children felt to be susceptible to measles across Colchester.

Dahl had hoped that the letter might result in saving a life, which would be Olivia's legacy. She had never had the choice of receiving the vaccine; it had been licensed in the year following her death.

In 1987, family doctors could obtain Dahl's letter from Sandwell Health Authority in West Bromwich, at a cost of £49 for 1,000.

== Reception and legacy ==
Two years later, the letter was republished and it has continued to be quoted after subsequent measles outbreaks. Dahl was later asked to promote the polio vaccine. In 2013, following the measles outbreak in South Wales, former British health minister Edwina Currie called for compulsory measles vaccination for small children, possibly a proposal somewhat influenced by Dahl, according to Solomon.

The letter was redistributed following the Disneyland measles outbreak in 2014–15. In 2016, with the resurgence of measles in the United States, an essay in the journal Medical Humanities, co-authored by David Oshinsky, looked at Dahl's letter and described how informing parents using statistics and evidence-based facts are not always effective for communicating the benefits of vaccination. According to the essay, the power of Dahl's narrative in tackling vaccine refusal reminds readers of the devastation of a disease that has generally been forgotten. Despite consensus that the vaccine is safe and effective, (Note: Measles vaccine in Europe in the 1970s was encouraged to reduce measles complications of meningoencephalitis and subacute sclerosing panencephalitis which can both be fatal, in addition to the less serious complications of pneumonia and otitis media. The measles vaccine in Europe was later combined with rubella vaccine and mumps vaccine, and is safe and effective.) the difficulties doctors face in convincing parents to fully vaccinate their children possibly lie in overemphasising scientific information, at the expense of communicating the benefits through stories such as Dahl's. The letter is available to read on the Oxford Vaccine Group vaccine knowledge website. Dahl's medical influence extended beyond measles vaccine, with the Wade-Dahl-Till valve, a surgical valve, and work on strokes.

== See also ==
- Roald Dahl's Marvellous Medicine
- Gamma globulin: this was given, as passive immunization against measles, but only to Olivia Dahl's younger brother, Theo.
