= Anthony Bryceson =

British academic (1934–2023)

Anthony David Malcolm Bryceson (1934–2023) was a British academic.

== Early life and education ==
Bryceson was born in Kohat, North-West Frontier Province of British India, now part of Khyber Pakhtunkhwa in Pakistan. His parents were Donald, an officer in the British Indian Army, and Muriel, a nurse. He attended Winchester College in Britain before studying natural sciences at Christ's College, Cambridge. He later trained as a doctor at Westminster Hospital Medical School, qualifying in 1959.

In 1969, Bryceson married Ulla Skalts, a Danish architect, and they had two children: William, an orthopaedic surgeon, and Maia, a physiotherapist, both of whom later settled in Australia. After his retirement, he relocated to Australia.

== Career ==
Bryceson made significant contributions to the field of tropical medicine. During the 1960s, while in Laos, he and another British doctor, Colin Prentice, were held captive by the Pathet Lao rebels. They used cricket and chess as means of communication and rapport with their captors, leading to their eventual release.

Bryceson subsequently worked at the Hospital for Tropical Diseases in London and expanded his career to Addis Ababa, Ethiopia, and Zaria, Nigeria, where he engaged in research activities. Bryceson's research in 1988 identified an early case of HIV-2, highlighting its longer incubation period compared to HIV-1. He published several research papers and books during his career.

Bryceson defended the relevance of tropical medicine during a 1996 debate at the Royal Society of Tropical Medicine and Hygiene.

In 1999, Bryceson was appointed as a professor at the London School of Hygiene and Tropical Medicine.

After retiring in 2000, Bryceson collaborated with Shoreland Travax, producing critiques for the online medical advisory platform.

== Awards and recognition ==
Bryceson was awarded the Chalmers Medal and Donald Mackay Medal for contributions to tropical health and medicine. In 2019 he was awarded the Vincenzo Marcolongo Memorial Lectureship.
