= The Pandemic Institute =

English research institute

- Established: 2021
- Chair: Tom Solomon
- Location: Liverpool, England
- Website: Official website

The Pandemic Institute (TPI), founded in 2021 and based in Liverpool, England, is a collaboration of academic, healthcare, civic and industrial partners dedicated to predicting, preparing for and responding to emerging infections and pandemic threats.

== History and background ==
The Institute was founded in 2021 with a mission to tackle emerging infections and ensure that the world will never again be as unprepared for a pandemic as it was in December 2019. Its establishment built upon Liverpool’s existing strengths in infectious-disease research, including the work of the NIHR Health Protection Research Unit in Emerging and Zoonotic Infections (since 2014) which was active in the UK response to Ebola, Zika and COVID-19. The Institute launched with an initial philanthropic donation of £10 million awarded to the region in recognition of Liverpool’s life-saving research and innovation during the COVID-19 pandemic. Its first director was Matthew Baylis. In 2022 he was succeeded by professor of neurology Tom Solomon.

== Mission, vision and research pillars ==
TPI's mission is providing a comprehensive response across the pandemic lifecycle: from predicting pathogen emergence, through preparation and response, to recovery.

Its three core pillars are:

- Predicting pathogen emergence and, though surveillance, preventing spread
- Preparing for likely threats though the 100 Days Mission
- Responding and recovering through clinical & social interventions

In addition, TPI emphasises collaboration with industry, academia, healthcare and civic partners as an essential component of its strategy.

== Founding partners and structure ==
The Institute is a partnership of multiple academic, healthcare and civic organisations based in the Liverpool city region. Key founding partners include:

- University of Liverpool
- Liverpool School of Tropical Medicine
- Liverpool John Moores University
- University Hospitals of Liverpool Group
- Liverpool City Council
- Liverpool City Region Combined Authority
- Knowledge Quarter Liverpool

The leadership of TPI is headed by Professor Tom Solomon CBE FRCP FMedSci (Professor of Neurology) who serves as Director of the Institute.
