= Matthew Baylis (epidemiologist) =

British academic

- Occupations: Epidemiologist and vector biology

Academic background
- Education: Oxford University

Academic work
- Institutions: Liverpool University

Matthew Baylis is a British professor of epidemiology and vector biology. In 2005, after several years at the Institute for Animal Health , he was appointed Chair in Veterinary Epidemiology at the University of Liverpool. In 2007 he established the Liverpool University Climate and Infectious Diseases of Animals group (LUCINDA), and between 2010 and 2015 was head of the Department of Epidemiology and Population Health in Liverpool University's Institute of Infection and Global Health. In 2021 he was appointed first director of then new The Pandemic Institute.

== Selected publications ==
- "Climate change and the recent emergence of bluetongue in Europe". Nature Reviews Microbiology. 3 (2): 171–181. February 2005. doi:10.1038/nrmicro1090. ISSN 1740-1534. (Co-author)
- "The Genetics of Scrapie in Sheep and Goats". Current Molecular Medicine. 4 (4): 385–396. 1 June 2004. doi:10.2174/1566524043360672. (Co-author)
- "Scientists' warning to humanity: microorganisms and climate change". Nature Reviews Microbiology. 17 (9): 569–586. September 2019. doi:10.1038/s41579-019-0222-5. hdl:11245.1/c8a0f791-b635-449e-8566-6f07e32d55b9. ISSN 1740-1534. PMC 7136171. (Co-author)
