= International Association for Medical Assistance to Travellers =

International medical association in travel medicine

- Abbreviation: IAMAT
- Formation: 1960
- Founder: Vincenzo Marcolongo
- Founded at: Rome, Italy
- Fields: Travel medicine
- Website: Official website

The International Association for Medical Assistance to Travellers is a medical association founded in 1960 in Rome, Italy, by Italian physician Vincenzo Marcolongo. It keeps a list of medical professionals that specialise in travel medicine across more than 80 countries, and it sponsors the Vincenzo Marcolongo Memorial Lectureship held annually at the American Society of Tropical Medicine and Hygiene.

== Vincenzo Marcolongo Memorial Lectureship ==
The Vincenzo Marcolongo Memorial Lectureship from the American Society of Tropical Medicine and Hygiene is awarded to a medical professional in travel medicine and is held annually.

=== Notable recipients ===
- 1991 Anthony Bryceson
- 1993 Thiravat Hemachudha
- 1994 Nicholas White
- 1999 Eli Schwartz
- 2000 Solomon Faine
- 2003 Tom Solomon
- 2010 Anita Zaidi
