= Annelies Wilder-Smith =

Professor of infectious diseases (born 1961)

Dr Annelies Wilder-Smith
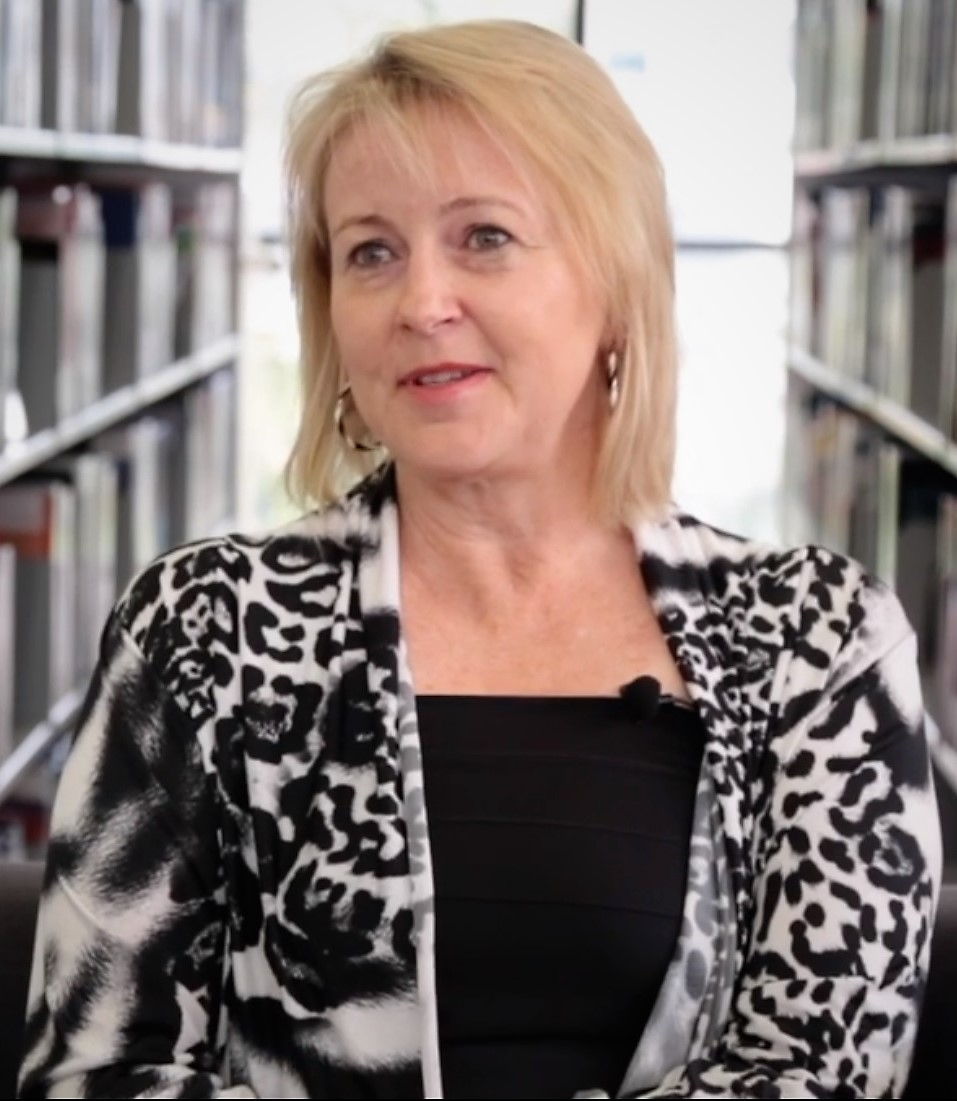
- Wilder-Smith interviewed in 2015
- Education: Doctor of Medicine, University Heidelberg, 1987. Master in Public Health, Curtin University, 2002. Doctor of Philosophy, University of Amsterdam, 2003
- Occupations: Professor of Emerging Infectious Diseases, epidemiologist, Educator
- Notable work: co-editor of the annual revisions of WHO’s “International Travel and Health”, “Manual of Travel Medicine & Health”, “Travel Medicine: tales behind the science”
- Spouse(s): Einar Wilder-Smith, January 5, 1991
- Awards: Myrone Levine Vaccinology Prize, Honor Award for exemplary leadership and coordination in determining and communicating global yellow fever at the Centers for Disease Control (CDC) Award Ceremony, Mercator Professorship award by the German Research Foundation, Ashdown Oration Award by the Australian College of Travel Medicine

Annelies Wilder-Smith (born 1961) is a professor of emerging infectious diseases at the London School of Hygiene and Tropical Medicine, and Visiting Professor of infectious diseases research at the Lee Kong Chian School of medicine. She is a world-renowned expert in travel and Tropical medicine. She is the past president of the International Society of Travel Medicine (ISTM), and the past president of the Asia Pacific Society of Travel Medicine and she was also the former chair of the Regional ISTM Conference in Singapore.

Wilder-Smith's research interests are COVID-19, SARS, influenza, travel health, vaccine-preventable and emerging infectious diseases, such as Zika, dengue, yellow fever, chikungunya, influenza and meningococcal disease.

== Education ==
Wilder-Smith obtained her MD from the University of Heidelberg, Germany, in 1987. She then received her master's degree in international health from the Curtin University in Australia, and her PhD from the University of Amsterdam, the Netherlands, in 2003. Wilder-Smith is a qualified public health physician with a PhD in infectious diseases.

== Accomplishments ==
Wilder-Smith has published more than 390 scientific papers, edited and co-edited textbooks and travel medicine books like Manual of Travel Medicine & Health, Travel Medicine: tales behind the science, How to take a medical history in Chinese.

== Career ==
Wilder-Smith is the president of the International Society of Travel Medicine (ISTM). She was the former president of the Asia Pacific Society of Travel Medicine, and she was also the former chair of the Regional ISTM Conference in Singapore.

She was Head of the Travellers' Health & Vaccination Center, Singapore, since 2000. She was an editorial consultant at The Lancet since 2004. She was also the chairman of Southeast Asia Research Committee, Leprosy Mission, Singapore, since 2004.

Since 2006, she is the co-editor of the annual revisions of the WHO's "International Travel and Health".

As of 2020, she is serving as professor of emerging infectious diseases at the London School of Hygiene and Tropical Medicine.
