= Gerome Breen =

Psychiatric geneticist

Gerome Breen is an Irish psychiatric geneticist and Professor of Psychiatric Genetics at the MRC Social, Genetic and Developmental Psychiatry (SGDP) Centre within the Institute of Psychiatry, Psychology and Neuroscience (IoPPN), King’s College London. His research focuses on the genetic and biological mechanisms underlying major psychiatric disorders, including depression, anxiety disorders, and eating disorders.

== Research and leadership ==
Together with Thalia C. Eley, Breen co-leads the Genetic Links to Anxiety and Depression (GLAD) Study, a large population-based research programme designed to recruit over 50,000 individuals with lived experience of depression or anxiety to support genetic and mental health research.

Breen is Chair of the NIHR Mental Health BioResource, a national research infrastructure supporting mental health studies across the United Kingdom. Within this programme, he leads the Eating Disorders Genetics Initiative UK (EDGI-UK), which aims to recruit 10,000 people with lived experience of an eating disorder to advance genetic research in this field.

He also leads the Eating Disorder Clinical Research Network (EDCRN), supporting coordinated clinical and translational research across NHS and academic partners in the United Kingdom. From 2016 to 2024, Breen served as co-chair of the Psychiatric Genomics Consortium Eating Disorders Working Group, contributing to international efforts to identify genetic risk factors for eating disorders.

In addition to his research roles, Breen serves as Academic Director of King’s Genomics, overseeing the development of large-scale sequencing and biobanking infrastructure at King’s College London. His work has contributed to international consortia such as the Psychiatric Genomics Consortium and has influenced research infrastructure development in mental health genomics.

Breen received his PhD in psychiatric genetics from the University of Aberdeen and has published extensively on the genetic architecture of psychiatric disorders, treatment response, and the integration of genomic data with clinical and phenotypic information.

== Public engagement and advocacy ==
Breen has worked with lived-experience advocates in the eating disorders field, including Hope Virgo, and has supported public engagement initiatives aimed at improving equity and access to eating disorder care. He was previously involved in the Hearts, Minds and Genes coalition, a health-policy initiative advocating for improved research funding and treatment for eating disorders.
