= British Journal of Hospital Medicine =

Peer-reviewed medical journal

- Discipline: Medicine
- Language: English

Publication details
- Former name: Hospital Medicine
- History: 1966–present
- Publisher: IMR Press
- Frequency: Monthly
- Impact factor: 1.7 (2025)

Standard abbreviations
- ISO 4: Br. J. Hosp. Med.
- NLM: Br J Hosp Med (Lond)

Indexing
- ISSN: 1750-8460 (print); 1759-7390 (web)
- LCCN: 2005264535
- OCLC no.: 61321318
- Hospital Medicine
- ISSN: 1462-3935 (print); 1462-3935 (web)

Links
- Journal homepage

The British Journal of Hospital Medicine is a monthly peer-reviewed medical journal principally aimed at hospital-based healthcare professionals. It was established in 1966 as Hospital Medicine, changing name to British Journal of Hospital Medicine from 1968 to 1997. In 1998, it changed back to Hospital Medicine, and returned to British Journal of Hospital Medicine in 2006. It is currently published by Mark Allen Publishing.

== Content ==
The journal publishes editorials, case reports, clinical reviews, quality improvement projects, and symposia, as well as completed audits which follow the SQUIRE (standards for quality improvement reporting excellence) guidelines. In addition, the journal includes a Doctors in Training section that includes papers aimed specifically for medical practitioners in core and specialist training in four categories:

- Clinical skills for postgraduate examinations
- What you need to know about
- Tips from the shop floor
- What they don't teach you in medical school

== Abstracting and indexing ==
The journal is abstracted and indexed in:

- BIOSIS Previews
- CINAHL
- Current Contents/Clinical Medicine
- Embase
- Index Medicus/MEDLINE/PubMed
- Science Citation Index Expanded
- Scopus

According to the Journal Citation Reports, the journal has a 2025 impact factor of 1.7.

== See also ==
- List of medical journals
