= Clinical Medicine (journal) =

- Discipline: Medicine
- Language: English
- Edited by: Anton Emmanuel

Publication details
- Former name(s): Journal of the Royal College of Physicians of London
- History: 1966–present
- Publisher: Royal College of Physicians (England)
- Frequency: Bimonthly
- Open access: Yes
- Impact factor: 2.046 (2018)

Standard abbreviations
- ISO 4: Clin. Med. (Lond.)

Indexing
- CODEN: CMLUBK
- ISSN: 1470-2118 (print); 1473-4893 (web)
- LCCN: 2001246089
- OCLC no.: 61312884

Links
- Journal homepage; Online access; Online archive

Clinical Medicine is a bimonthly peer-reviewed medical journal published by the Royal College of Physicians. It was established in 1966 as the Journal of the Royal College of Physicians of London. It carried both names between 1998 and 2000, and since 2001 it has appeared as Clinical Medicine. The editor-in-chief is Prof Anton Emmanuel.

== Abstracting and indexing ==
The journal is abstracted and indexed in:

- Academic Search
- Biological Abstracts
- BIOSIS Previews
- CINAHL
- Current Contents/Clinical Medicine
- Embase
- Index Medicus/MEDLINE/PubMed
- Science Citation Index
- Scopus

According to the Journal Citation Reports, the journal has a 2018 impact factor of 2.046, ranking it 58th out of 156 journals in the category "Medicine, General & Internal".
