= Australasian Journal of Neuroscience =

The Australasian Journal of Neuroscience is a peer-reviewed neuroscience journal established in 1988. It is the official journal of the Australasian Neuroscience Nurses Association and is published by Exeley twice a year.
