= British Society of Literature and Science =

Learned society

The British Society of Literature and Science is a learned society established in 2005, 20 years after the Society for Literature, Science, and the Arts.
