= Claire Panosian =

Emeritus Professor of Medicine

Claire Panosian Dunavan
- Born: April 16, 1951 (age 75)
- Education: Stanford University; Northwestern Feinberg School of Medicine; London School of Hygiene & Tropical Medicine; Tufts-New England Medical Center
- Known for: Global health and journalism
- Scientific career
- Workplaces: University of California, Los Angeles

Claire Panosian Dunavan, MD, DTM&H (London) is an American physician and infectious diseases specialist with a second career in medical communications. A past-president of the American Society of Tropical Medicine and Hygiene, she is now an Emeritus Professor of Medicine (recalled) at the University of California, Los Angeles (UCLA) and writes a column called Of Parasites and Plagues for the online newspaper MedPage Today. Her award-winning documentary—“Accidental Host: The Story of Rat Lungworm Disease”—about a brain-invading foodborne parasite that currently threatens people in tropical and semi-tropical areas in six continents has been airing and streaming on PBS stations since 2022.

== Early life and education ==
Claire Panosian was born in Los Angeles and also grew up in Santa Barbara, California. During World War II, her father, a graduate of UCLA, was a commanding officer on Guadalcanal, where he suffered from malaria and dengue fever. Her mother graduated from UC Berkeley, then worked as a civilian at the 4th Air Force Bomber Command in San Francisco. As a child and adolescent, Panosian travelled widely in the United States and Europe, then studied history and pre-medical science at Stanford University and worked at a rural hospital in Haiti. She completed her medical degree and post-graduate training in internal medicine at Northwestern University and completed a course in tropical medicine at the London School of Hygiene & Tropical Medicine followed by a 3 ½-year fellowship in infectious diseases and geographic medicine at Tufts-New England Medical Center in Boston.

== Research and career ==
While in Boston, Panosian's basic science research focused on leishmaniasis; she also spent 3 months as a visiting professor in Taiwan and performed field studies of local helminthic parasites. In 1984 Panosian joined the faculty at University of California, Los Angeles (UCLA) as the Chief of Infectious Diseases at Los Angeles County-Olive View Medical Center. Here Panosian dealt with the beginning of the HIV/AIDS epidemic at a time when there were no specific HIV blood tests or anti-virals while also treating immigrants with infections rarely seen in the U.S. In 1987 she moved to the main campus of UCLA, where she founded the Travel and Tropical Medicine Clinic and later co-founded UCLA's Global Health program. Along with her medical activities at UCLA, Panosian collaborated with colleagues in economics and international development and worked in multiple overseas countries as a visiting professor, policy consultant, or journalist. In 2008, Panosian was elected president of the American Society of Tropical Medicine and Hygiene.

=== Print and Broadcast Journalism ===
Claire Panosian Dunavan’s second career in media includes 6 years as a writer, medical editor, reporter and co-anchor for national programs on Lifetime Television. She received a Freddie Award for her interview with a dying physician. In 2000, she helped to produce a documentary about hepatitis B that was translated into multiple languages and reached more than 300 million viewers in Asia. Around the same time, she created “The Doctor Files” — a monthly, story-driven column for the Los Angeles Times. Over the next decade, she had frequent bylines in the Los Angeles Times and Scientific American and launched a long-running series of articles for Discover magazine featuring true-life stories about infectious diseases. Other features, columns, essays, op-eds, book reviews and interviews by Dunavan have run in The New York Times, The Washington Post, The Baltimore Sun, Chicago Tribune, The Hill, The New England Journal of Medicine, JAMA, Health Affairs, UCLA’s U Magazine, and the American Journal of Tropical Medicine and Hygiene. Between 2009 and 2013, “The Infection Files,” Dunavan’s weekly column for MediaNews Group, reached 2 million California readers. Since 2022, she has written a column called “Of Parasites and Plagues” for MedPage Today.

== Personal life ==
After meeting him at Lifetime Television, Panosian later married Patrick Dunavan, an award-winning editor, producer, director and documentary filmmaker with whom she actively collaborated until his death in May 2025.Today she continues to lead a media production company and a private foundation they jointly created.

== Selected publications ==
- Panosian, Claire (2007). "Origins of major human infectious diseases". Nature. 447 (7142): 278–283. Bibcode:2007Natur.447..279W. doi:10.1038/nature05775. PMC 7095142. PMID 17507975.
- Panosian, Claire (2006). "The New Medical "Missionaries" — Grooming the Next Generation of Global Health Workers". N Engl J Med. 354 (17): 1771–1773. doi:10.1056/NEJMp068035. PMID 16641393.
- Panosian, Claire (1995). "Human antiprotozoal therapy: past, present, and future". Clinical Microbiology Reviews. 8 (3): 427–439. doi:10.1128/CMR.8.3.427. PMC 174634. PMID 7553575.
- Panosian, C. (1983). "An American doctor in Kaohsiung." Taiwan Review, Winter, 2–9.
- Arrow, K. A., Panosian, C. B., & Gelband, H. (eds.). (2004). Saving Lives, Buying Time: The Economics of Malaria in an Age of Resistance. National Academies Press, Washington, D.C.
- Mullan, F., Panosian, C. B., & Cuff, P. (eds.). (2005). Healers Abroad: Americans Responding to the Human Resource Crisis in HIV/AIDS. National Academies Press, Washington, D.C.
- Panosian Dunavan C, Mellinkoff S. The lead files—a chronicle of ignorance, avarice, and progress, Pharos, Autumn 2007; pp 17-22.
- Zaghi D, Panosian C, Gutierrez MA, Gregson A, Taylor E, Ochoa MT. New World cutaneous leishmaniasis: current challenges in diagnosis and parenteral treatment. J Am Acad Dermatol. 2011 Mar 64(3): 587-92.
- Cowie RH, Ansdell V, Panosian Dunavan C, Rollins RL. Neuroangiostrongyliasis: Global Spread of an Emerging Tropical Disease. Am J Trop Med Hyg. 2022 Nov 7;107(6):1166-1172. doi: 10.4269/ajtmh.22-0360. PMID: 36343594; PMCID: PMC9768254.
