= International Society of Travel Medicine =

- Abbreviation: ISTM
- Formation: 1991
- Type: Society
- Purpose: To promote travel health initiatives

The International Society of Travel Medicine (ISTM) is an international society of physicians, pharmacists, nurses, and other medical professionals based in Dunwoody, United States to promote travel health initiatives. Founded as an organization in 1991, ISTM has built a global network that is committed to the advancement of travel medicine - currently the largest organization of this type. The ISTM fosters research, facilitates the rapid exchange of information, and provides educational programming to serve the travel medicine community. Promoting the development and evaluation of safe, effective, preventive and curative interventions for patients prior to travel, during travel and post travel is an important aspect of supporting the travel medicine community.

== Global Travel Clinic Directory ==
ISTM hosts a Global Travel Clinic Directory that enables travelers to find medical assistance in over 80 countries. Travel clinics provide travelers with specialized travel medicine care that includes pre, post and during travel immunizations, treatment, and medicines for protection against and treatment of diseases acquired during international travel. Many of the clinics provide care in various languages for better communication between patients and healthcare professionals.

== Certificate of Knowledge ==
ISTM sponsors an examination for professionals to earn a Certificate of Knowledge in Travel Medicine. This exam is offered annually. The exam is written and developed by an international panel of travel medicine experts who are representative of the variety of professional disciplines associated with travel medicine. The exam represents a global standard for travel medicine practitioners in proficiency in travel medicine. In passing the Certificate of Knowledge Examination, one is awarded a Certificate of Travel Health, or CTH.

== Online Learning ==
ISTM established a Travel Medicine Online Learning program consisting of more than 100 educational modules on travel medicine topics. The modules are available over the internet to members of the society as well as non-members.

== Conferences of the International Society of Travel Medicine ==
The Conference of the International Society of Travel Medicine (CISTM) is the largest biennial gathering of travel medicine professionals. Typically alternating between Europe and North America, each CISTM provides opportunities for medical professionals to advance their specialty of travel medicine through plenary, symposium, and workshop meetings. Experts in the travel medicine and tangential subjects are invited to provide each delegate with comprehensive knowledge of current events in travel medicine. In non-CISTM years, the ISTM supports regional conferences around the world in conjunction with regional travel medicine societies. The next CISTM will be held in Bangkok, Thailand in 2027.

=== Previous CISTMs ===
- 2025 - 19th CISTM - New Orleans, United States of America
- 2023 - 18th CISTM - Basel, Switzerland
- 2021 - 17th CISTM - Virtual
- 2019 - 16th CISTM - Washington, DC, United States of America
- 2017 - 15th CISTM - Barcelona, Spain
- 2015 - 14th CISTM - Québec City, Canada
- 2013 - 13th CISTM - Maastricht, The Netherlands
- 2011 - 12th CISTM - Boston, United States of America
- 2009 - 11th CISTM - Budapest, Hungary
- 2007 - 10th CISTM - Vancouver, Canada
- 2005 - 9th CISTM - Lisbon, Portugal
- 2003 - 8th CISTM - New York City, United States of America
- 2001 - 7th CISTM - Innsbruck, Austria
- 1999 - 6th CISTM - Montreal, Canada
- 1997 - 5th CISTM - Geneva, Switzerland
- 1995 - 4th CISTM - Acapulco, Mexico
- 1993 - 3rd CISTM - Paris, France
- 1991 - 2nd CISTM - Atlanta, United States of America
- 1988 - 1ST CISTM - Zurich, Switzerland

== The Journal of Travel Medicine ==
The Journal of Travel Medicine is a peer reviewed and PubMed-indexed journal for the concentration of travel medicine. Published by ISTM six times a year, it provides medical professionals with current research and original articles. Subjects included in previous journals are: epidemiology among traveling individuals (including members of the military, refugees, and migrants), preventative travel care, diagnosis of illnesses obtained during travel, adventure travel, expatriated individuals, self-therapy, and the impact of travelers on a host country.

== GeoSentinel ==
The GeoSentinel Network is a global surveillance network of ISTM Member Clinics created in order to gather and share data concerning travel and tropical medicine. The GeoSentinel Network was founded in 1995 with the support of ISTM and the United States Centers for Disease Control and Prevention to identify and alert medical professionals of illnesses among travelers, immigrants, and refugees. GeoSentinel Sites, located on five continents, participate in surveillance and monitoring of travelers to detect alarming diagnoses or atypical events. These activities allow for information sharing globally and enables health authorities to be aware of global trends in morbidity.

== Research grants ==
In order to facilitate ongoing research in the field of travel medicine, ISTM awards Research Grants to ISTM members annually. These research grants are carefully selected by a peer-reviewed process and Research and Awards Committee. The grants provide support for research to encourage travel medicine interest, and enable researchers to collect data and test hypotheses to provide opportunities for application to more substantive grants in the future.
