= Firm (medicine) =

The firm is a medical team, typically seen in apprenticeship style training in hospital settings. After 2005 in the UK, when trainees started rotating more regularly under the Modernising Medical Careers program, the system of firms in the UK declined.

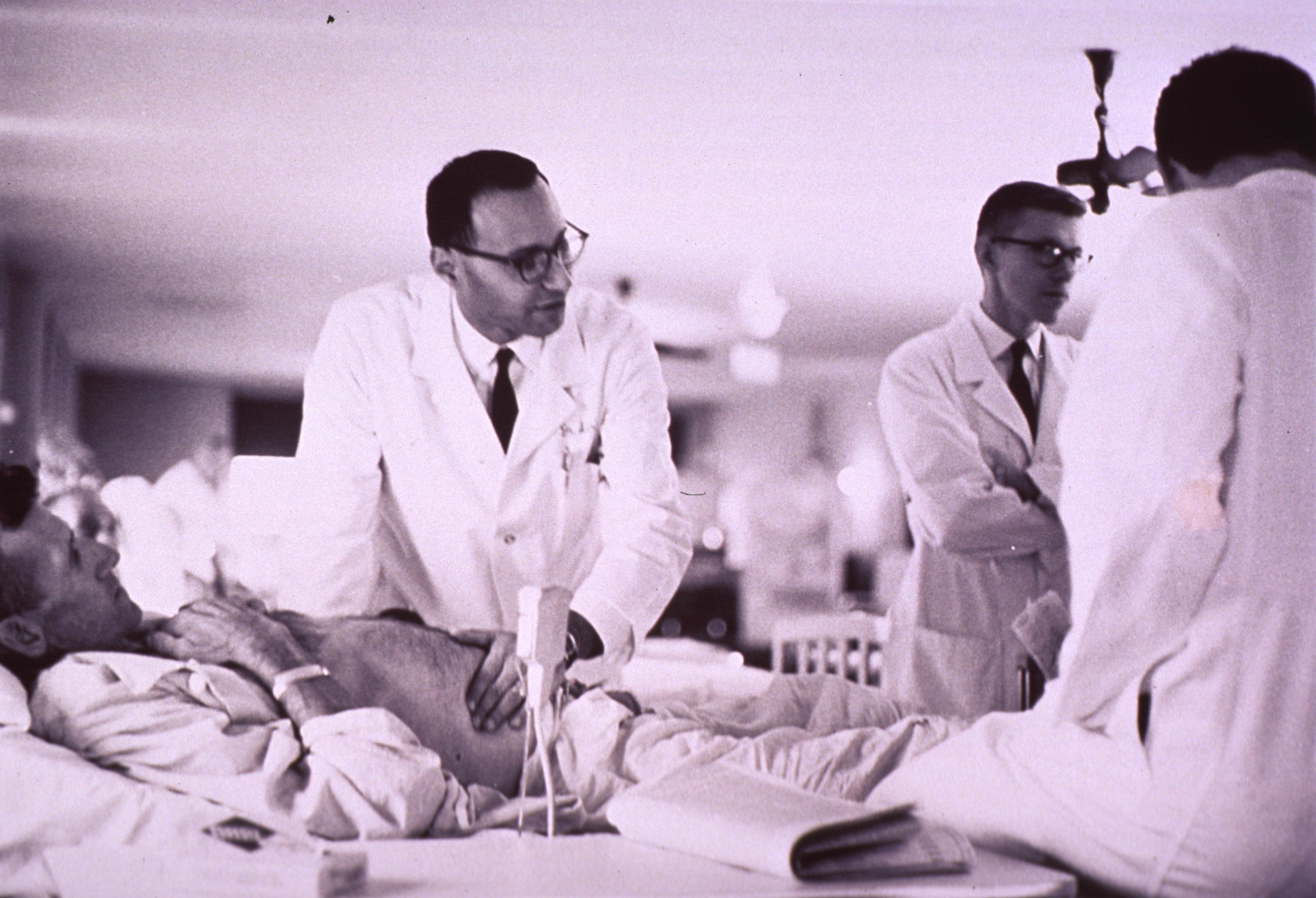
Medical firm at the bedside
