= UK Charity Awards =

The UK Charity Awards are annual awards for outstanding achievements within the UK not-for-profit sector. Categories reflect the management of charities and not-for-profits, and awards are made to individuals, departments and whole organizations. In 2023, there were 12 award categories.

Past individual winners have included Lord Rix and Richard Curtis, both for the Lifetime Achievement Award.

The event is hosted by Charity Times magazine, with help from BBC Training and Development and The Community Channel, as well as commercial sponsors such as Barclays, JLA, Sage Group, BDO Global, CCLA, and Investec.
