= Encephalitis =

Inflammation of the brain

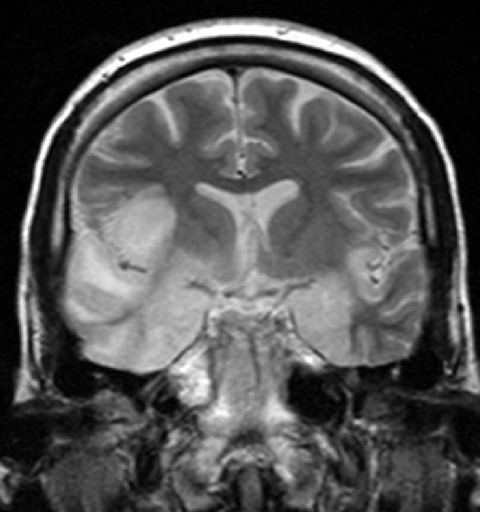
- MRI scan image shows high signal in the temporal lobes and right inferior frontal gyrus in someone with herpes simplex encephalitis.
- Specialty: Neurology, infectious disease
- Symptoms: Headache, fever, confusion, stiff neck, vomiting
- Complications: Seizures, trouble speaking, memory problems, problems hearing
- Duration: Weeks to months for recovery
- Types: Herpes simplex, West Nile, rabies, Eastern equine, others
- Causes: Infection, autoimmune, certain medication, unknown
- Diagnostic method: Based on symptoms, supported by blood tests, medical imaging, analysis of cerebrospinal fluid
- Treatment: Antiviral medication, anticonvulsants, corticosteroids, artificial respiration
- Prognosis: Variable
- Frequency: 4.3 million (2015)
- Deaths: 150,000 (2015)

Encephalitis (US: /ɛnsɛfəlˈaɪtɪs/, UK: /ɛnkɛfəlˈaɪtɪs/) is inflammation of the brain. The severity can be variable with symptoms including reduction or alteration in consciousness, aphasia, headache, fever, confusion, a stiff neck, and vomiting. Complications may include seizures, hallucinations, trouble speaking, memory problems, and problems with hearing.

Causes of encephalitis include viruses such as herpes simplex virus and rabies virus as well as bacteria, fungi, or parasites. Other causes include autoimmune diseases and certain medications. In many cases the cause remains unknown. Risk factors include a weak immune system. Diagnosis is typically based on symptoms and supported by blood tests, medical imaging, and analysis of cerebrospinal fluid.

Certain types are preventable with vaccines. Treatment may include antiviral medications (such as acyclovir), anticonvulsants, and corticosteroids. Treatment generally takes place in hospital. Some people require artificial respiration. Once the immediate problem is under control, rehabilitation may be required. In 2015, encephalitis was estimated to have affected 4.3 million people and resulted in 150,000 deaths worldwide.

== Signs and symptoms ==
Adults with encephalitis present with acute onset of fever, headache, confusion, and sometimes seizures. Younger children or infants may present with irritability, poor appetite and fever. Neurological examinations usually reveal a drowsy or confused person. Stiff neck, due to the irritation of the meninges covering the brain, indicates that the patient has either meningitis or meningoencephalitis.

=== Limbic encephalitis ===
Limbic encephalitis refers to inflammatory disease confined to the limbic system of the brain. The clinical presentation often includes disorientation, disinhibition, memory loss, seizures, and behavioral anomalies. MRI imaging reveals T2 hyperintensity in the structures of the medial temporal lobes, and in some cases, other limbic structures. Some cases of limbic encephalitis are of autoimmune origin.

=== Encephalitis lethargica ===
Encephalitis lethargica is identified by high fever, headache, delayed physical response, and lethargy. Individuals can exhibit upper body weakness, muscular pains, and tremors. The cause of encephalitis lethargica is unknown. From 1917 to 1928, an epidemic of encephalitis lethargica occurred worldwide.

== Cause ==
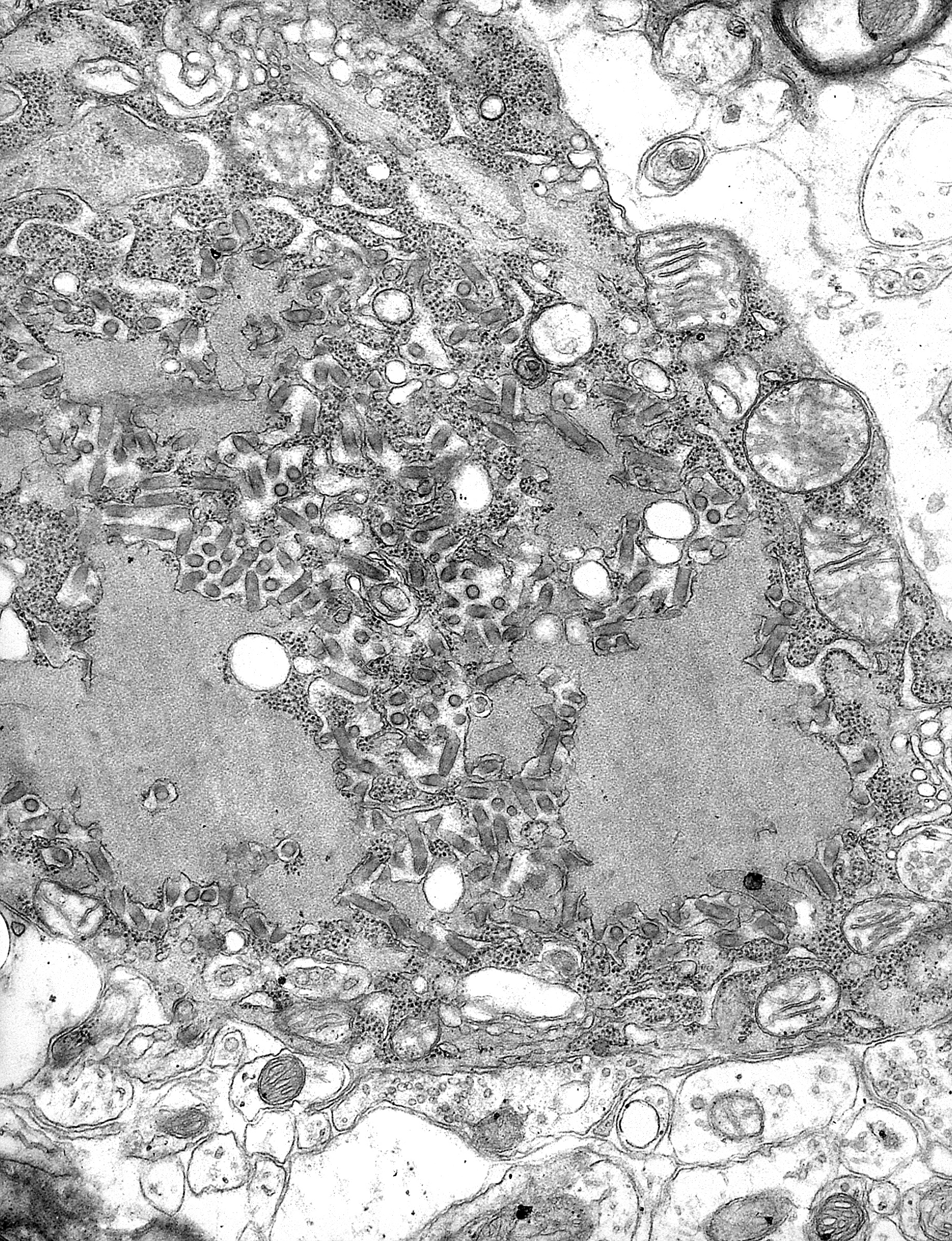
Rabies virus

In 30%-40% of encephalitis cases, the etiology remains unknown.

=== Viral ===
Viral infections are the usual cause of infectious encephalitis. Viral encephalitis can occur either as a direct effect of an acute infection, or as one of the sequelae of a latent infection. The majority of viral cases of encephalitis have an unknown cause; however, the most common identifiable cause of viral encephalitis is from herpes simplex infection. Other causes of acute viral encephalitis are rabies virus, poliovirus, and measles virus.

Additional possible viral causes are arboviral flavivirus (St. Louis encephalitis, West Nile virus), bunyavirus (La Crosse strain), arenavirus (lymphocytic choriomeningitis virus), reovirus (Colorado tick virus), and henipavirus infections. The Powassan virus is a rare cause of encephalitis.

=== Bacterial ===
It can be caused by a bacterial infection, such as bacterial meningitis, or may be a complication of an active infectious disease such as syphilis (secondary encephalitis).

Other bacterial pathogens, like Mycoplasma and those causing rickettsial disease, cause inflammation of the meninges and consequently encephalitis. Lyme disease or Bartonella henselae may also cause encephalitis.

=== Other infectious causes ===
Certain parasitic or protozoal infestations, such as toxoplasmosis and malaria can also cause encephalitis in people with compromised immune systems.

The rare but typically deadly forms of encephalitis, primary amoebic meningoencephalitis and Granulomatous amoebic encephalitis, are caused by free-living amoeba.

=== Autoimmune encephalitis ===
Autoimmune encephalitis signs can include catatonia, psychosis, abnormal movements, and autonomic dysregulation. Antibody-mediated anti-N-methyl-D-aspartate-receptor encephalitis and Rasmussen encephalitis are examples of autoimmune encephalitis.

Anti-NMDA receptor encephalitis is the most common autoimmune form, and is accompanied by ovarian teratoma in 58 percent of affected women 18–45 years of age.

Another autoimmune cause includes acute disseminated encephalitis, a demyelinating disease which primarily affects children.

== Diagnosis ==
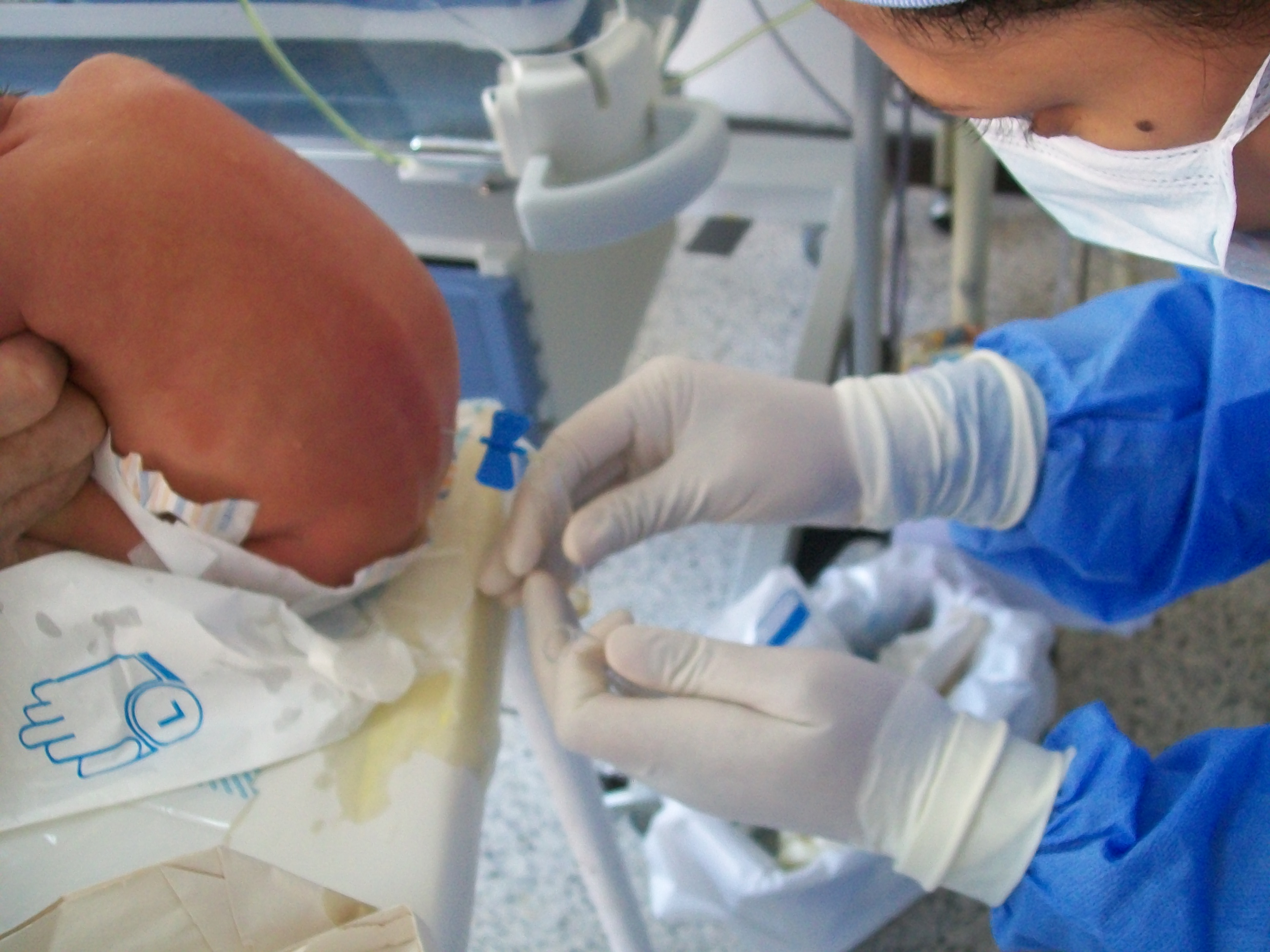
Spinal tap on a newborn

People should only be diagnosed with encephalitis if they have a decreased or altered level of consciousness, lethargy, or personality change for at least twenty-four hours without any other explainable cause. Diagnosing encephalitis is done via a variety of tests:

- Brain scan, done by MRI, can determine inflammation and differentiate from other possible causes.
- EEG, in monitoring brain activity, encephalitis will produce abnormal signal.
- Lumbar puncture (spinal tap), this helps determine via a test using the cerebral-spinal fluid, obtained from the lumbar region.
- Blood test
- Urine analysis
- Polymerase chain reaction (PCR) testing of the cerebrospinal fluid, to detect the presence of viral DNA which is a sign of viral encephalitis.

== Prevention ==
Vaccination is available against tick-borne and Japanese encephalitis and should be considered for at-risk individuals. Post-infectious encephalomyelitis complicating smallpox vaccination – which is a rare side effect – is avoidable, for all intents and purposes, as smallpox is nearly eradicated. Contraindication to pertussis immunization should be observed in patients with encephalitis.

== Treatment ==
An ideal drug to treat brain infection should be small, moderately lipophilic at pH of 7.4, low level of plasma protein binding, volume of distribution of litre per kg, does not have strong affinity towards binding with P-glycoprotein, or other efflux pumps on the surface of the blood–brain barrier. Some drugs such as isoniazid, pyrazinamide, linezolid, metronidazole, fluconazole, and some fluoroquinolones have good penetration of the blood brain barrier. Treatment (which is based on supportive care) is as follows:

- Antiviral medications (if virus is cause)
- Antibiotics, (if bacteria is cause)
- Steroids are used to reduce brain swelling
- Sedatives for restlessness
- Acetaminophen for fever
- Occupational and physical therapy (if brain is affected post-infection)

Pyrimethamine-based maintenance therapy is often used to treat toxoplasmic encephalitis (TE), which is caused by Toxoplasma gondii and can be life-threatening for people with weak immune systems. The use of highly active antiretroviral therapy (HAART), in conjunction with the established pyrimethamine-based maintenance therapy, decreases the chance of relapse in patients with HIV and TE from approximately 18% to 11%. This is a significant difference as relapse may impact the severity and prognosis of disease and result in an increase in healthcare expenditure.

The effectiveness of intravenous immunoglobulin for the management of childhood encephalitis is unclear. Systematic reviews have been unable to draw firm conclusions because of a lack of randomised double-blind studies with sufficient numbers of patients and sufficient follow-up. There is the possibility of a benefit of intravenous immunoglobulin for some forms of childhood encephalitis on some indicators such as length of hospital stay, time to stop spasms, time to regain consciousness, and time to resolution of neuropathic symptoms and fever. Intravenous immunoglobulin for Japanese encephalitis appeared to have no benefit when compared with placebo (pretend) treatment.

== Prognosis ==
Identification of poor prognostic factors include cerebral edema, status epilepticus, and thrombocytopenia. In contrast, a normal encephalogram at the early stages of diagnosis is associated with high rates of survival.

== Epidemiology ==
Encephalitis deaths per million persons in 2012 0-0 1-1 2-2 3-4 5-9 10-14 15-24 25-45

The number of new cases a year of acute encephalitis in Western countries is 7.4 cases per 100,000 people per year. In tropical countries, the incidence is 6.34 per 100,000 people per year. The number of cases of encephalitis has not changed much over time, with about 250,000 cases a year from 2005 to 2015 in the US. Approximately seven per 100,000 people were hospitalized for encephalitis in the US during this time. In 2015, encephalitis was estimated to have affected 4.3 million people and resulted in 150,000 deaths worldwide. Herpes simplex encephalitis has an incidence of 2–4 per million of the population per year.

== Terminology ==
Encephalitis with meningitis is known as meningoencephalitis, while encephalitis with involvement of the spinal cord is known as encephalomyelitis.

The word is from Ancient Greek ἐγκέφαλος, enképhalos 'brain', composed of ἐν, en, 'in' and κεφαλή, kephalé, 'head', and the medical suffix -itis 'inflammation'.

== See also ==
- Bickerstaff's encephalitis
- Cerebritis
- La Crosse encephalitis
- Primary amoebic meningoencephalitis
- Sappinia amoebic encephalitis
- Wernicke's encephalopathy
- World Encephalitis Day
- Zika virus
