= Molly Leach =

American graphic designer (born 1960)

Molly Leach (born October 4, 1960) is an American graphic designer known for her work in children's books including The Stinky Cheese Man and The True Story of the Three Little Pigs!.

== Early career ==
Molly Leach began her career in 1982 as a designer at Sport magazine and later designed special issues and annuals for magazines such as Sports Illustrated and Business Week.

== Book design ==
Leach's career designing picture book covers began when she was recruited by Lane Smith, illustrator of the 1989 picture book The True Story of the Three Little Pigs!, to design the book's cover. She worked with Smith to design covers for the 1991 books The Big Pets and Glasses Who Needs 'Em? before her well-known cover of The Stinky Cheese Man and Other Fairly Stupid Tales was published in 1992.

Other notable covers by Leach have been featured in new editions of Roald Dahl books; Jack Gantos's Joey Pigza books; the Dr. Seuss treasury Your Favorite Seuss: A Baker's Dozen by the One and Only Dr. Seuss; and the 50th anniversary edition of A Wrinkle in Time by Madeleine L'Engle (2012).

== Reception ==
Leach's unconventional style involves zany elements such as upside down text and bold headline fonts, and has influenced children's book design. The Stinky Cheese Man in particular has been specifically credited with moving children's design into a new era. Leach "opened the door in a lot of ways" claimed the book designer Isabel Warren-Lynch, who wrote, "When we saw The Stinky Cheese Man, designers said, 'This is what we want to do, too!'"

In a 1998 essay, Jon Scieszka praised Leach for going beyond the typical role of a designer: "When she’s done, the design tells as much of the story as the text and illustrations do." "People leafing through The Stinky Cheese Man would see that something different was going on — and realize that a good part of that 'something' was Molly's design", Scieszka wrote. Smith echoed this sentiment: "Jon and I both appreciate goofy, second-grade humor. If it were up to us, we would use all comic-book type or hand lettered type made of twigs. Molly, with her background in magazine design is different. She'll take what we do — and make it classy."

"She thought that unusually big, dramatic type best communicated the fun of stories in which things continually went haywire" wrote children's literature scholar Leonard S. Marcus in the 2001 book Side by Side. "And she wanted each page to feel as if it were ready to burst at the margins."

Steven Heller and Steven Guarnaccia state in Designing for Children (1994, Watson-Guptill), "while Smith's drawings are artfully primitive... it is the book design by Molly Leach that is the BRUTest of all... the type varies in weight, size and leading, but there are other witty tricks: for instance, where there isn't enough text to fill a page it is repeated, and when the character Chicken Licken is introduced the type, not the sky, falls on her head."

== Books designed by Leach ==
- The True Story of the 3 Little Pigs! (cover only), Jon Scieszka, Lane Smith (Viking, 1989)
- Glasses (Who Needs 'Em?), Lane Smith (Viking, 1991)
- The Big Pets, Lane Smith (Viking, 1991)
- The Stinky Cheese Man, Jon Scieszka, Lane Smith (Viking, 1992) – Caldecott Honor Book
- The Happy Hocky Family!, Lane Smith (Viking, 1993)
- Purr... Children's Book Illustrators Brag about Their Cats, Michael J. Rosen (Harcourt Children's Books, 1996)
- Math Curse, Jon Scieszka, Lane Smith (Viking, 1995)
- James and the Giant Peach, Roald Dahl, Lane Smith (Random House, 1996 edition)
- Speak! Children's Book Illustrators Brag about Their Dogs, Michael J. Rosen (Harcourt Children's Books, 1993)
- Squids Will Be Squids, Jon Scieszka, illustrated by Lane Smith (Viking, 1998)
- Hooray for Diffendoofer Day!, Dr. Seuss and Jack Prelutsky, illustrated by Lane Smith (Random House, 1998)
- The complete Roald Dahl library (paperback), Roald Dahl, illustrated by Quentin Blake (Puffin, 1998)
- The True Story of the Three Little Pigs: 10th Anniversary Edition, Jon Scieszka, Lane Smith (Viking, 1999)
- Baby! Talk!, Penny Gentieu (Crown, 1999)
- The Very Persistent Gappers of Frip, George Saunders, Lane Smith (McSweeney's, 2000)
- Pilgrims of Plymouth, Susan E. Goodman (National Geographic Children's Books, 2001)
- Exploring Space, Toni Eugene (National Geographic Children's Books, 2001)
- Insects, Robin Bernard (National Geographic Children's Books, 2001)
- A Tree for all Seasons, Robin Bernard (National Geographic Children's Books, 2001)
- Baloney (Henry P.), Jon Scieszka, Lane Smith (Viking, 2001)
- Pinocchio: The Boy, Lane Smith (Viking, 2002)
- The complete Roald Dahl library (hardcover), Roald Dahl, Quentin Blake (Knopf, 2002)
- The Stinky Cheese Man: 10th Anniversary Edition, Jon Scieszka, Lane Smith (Viking, 2002) – Caldecott Honor Book
- The Happy Hocky Family Moves to the Country!, Lane Smith (Viking, 2003)
- Science Verse, Jon Scieszka, Lane Smith (Viking, 2004)
- Your Favorite Seuss: A Baker's Dozen by the One and Only Dr. Seuss (Random House, 2004)
- Seen Art?, Jon Scieszka, Lane Smith (MoMA, Viking, 2005)
- Pilobolus: The Human Alphabet, John Kane (Roaring Brook, 2005)
- John, Paul, George & Ben, Lane Smith (Hyperion Press, 2006)
- Cowboy and Octopus, Jon Scieszka, Lane Smith (Viking, 2007)
- Bloom!, Maria Van Lieshout (Feiwel & Friends, 2007)
- Madam President, Lane Smith (Viking, 2008)
- Splash!, Maria Van Lieshout (Feiwel & Friends, 2008)
- Big Plans, Bob Shea, Lane Smith (Hyperion, 2008)
- The Big Elephant In The Room, Lane Smith (Hyperion, 2009)
- Peep!, Maria Van Lieshout (Feiwel & Friends, 2009)
- Princess Hyacinth, Florence Parry Heide, Lane Smith (Schwartz & Wade, 2009)
- It's a Book, Lane Smith (Roaring Brook Press, 2010)
- Tumble!, Maria Van Lieshout (Feiwel & Friends, 2010)
- Revolution, Jennifer Donnelly (Delacorte Press, 2010)
- Lulu and the Brontosaurus, Judith Viorst, Lane Smith (Atheneum Books, 2010)
- It's a Little Book, Lane Smith (Roaring Brook, 2011)
- Grandpa Green, Lane Smith (Roaring Brook, 2011) – Caldecott Honor Book
- Abe Lincoln's Dream, Lane Smith (Roaring Brook, 2012)
- A Wrinkle in Time, Madeleine L'Engle (FSG, 2012)
- Lulu Walks the Dogs, Judith Viorst, Lane Smith (Atheneum Books, 2012)
- Kid Sheriff and the Terrible Toads, Bob Shea, Lane Smith (Roaring Brook, 2014)
- The True Story of the Three Little Pigs: 25th Anniversary Edition, Jon Scieszka, Lane Smith (Viking, 2014)
- Joey Pigza Swallowed the Key, Jack Gantos (FSG, 2014)
- Joey Pigza Loses Control, Jack Gantos (FSG, 2014)
- What Would Joey Do?, Jack Gantos (FSG, 2014)
- I Am Not Joey Pigza, Jack Gantos (FSG, 2014)
- The Key That Swallowed Joey Pigza, Jack Gantos (FSG, 2014)
- Return to Augie Hobble, Lane Smith (Roaring Brook, 2015)

== Personal life ==
Leach is married to Lane Smith, a children's book author and illustrator with whom she frequently collaborates. Previously, the couple lived in New York City for 30 years, and in 2023, it was reported that they had moved to a remote, wooded part of Connecticut. Leach and Smith have a dog and a cat. They often hike in the mornings.
