= Fairy tale parody =

Genre of fiction

Fairy tale parody (also known as a fractured fairy tale) is a genre of fiction that parodies traditional fairy tales. The parodies are often created as new literary stories, movies, or television shows.

The genre was popularized on television by the "Fractured Fairy Tales" segments on The Rocky and Bullwinkle Show.

The 2001 animated film Shrek highly popularized the genre. The genre garnered significant praise for representing contemporary societal views, but it has also been criticised for supplanting traditional stories.

== Origins ==
Foney Fables, an early example of the genre from 1942

The genre of fairy tale parody grew in popularity following the “Fractured Fairy Tales” segment on The Rocky and Bullwinkle Show in 1959, where well-known fairy tales were presented with altered storylines for a modern audience. Since then, fairy tale adaptions have pervaded contemporary popular culture—subverting, shattering, and altering understandings of classic fairy tales—with the digital revolution significantly contributing to the dissemination of these new tales in the 21st century. There are two types of fairy tale parodies: one focused on mocking the fairy tale genre and individual tales themselves, and the other, reformatting tales to include more serious morals and social messages. Literary scholars and critics tend to focus on the tales that reflect the evolving sociocultural conditions of the 21st century. The fluid nature of the fairy tale and the evolution of technology has allowed fairy tales to permeate a wide range of media, providing these parodied tales with means to be presented in more creative and advanced forms, and providing the creators with an ability to alter the audience's reception of the stories being told. This fluidity of the genre has allowed fairy tale parodies to mutate over time and be portrayed in a plethora of forms—not only literary parodies but live-action and animated film and television, poetry, comics, and music—that have provided audiences with ubiquitous access to these complex narratives.

== Development of the fairy tale parody ==
Traditional fairy tales are believed to be derived from myths, relevant to religions of the time and as storytellers discarded religious connotations, the fairy tales became much more secular. As society progressed, and authors began writing fairy tale parodies, pertinent social and political matters became the key focus of the tales, and the question of “what, if any, is the role and function of such tales in the evolution of human civilisation” (Burkert, 1979), was fundamental to the development of these parodies. Parody is “governed by intentionality” (Hutcheon, 1985), thus when crafting a parody of traditional fairy tales, writers borrow, both consciously and unconsciously from other cultures in an “endeavour to imbue their symbolical stories with very specific commentaries on the mores and manners of their times”. Writers of fairy tale parodies decide what is relevant in society and communicate this crucial information through their tales, utilising memorable motifs, stereotype subversions and intertextuality. The parodies are radical and significantly deviate from the trajectory of the traditional tale, modernising the previously explored ideologies to resonate with a contemporary audience and allow readers to question the principles of existing narratives. Fairy tale parodies will resonate with an audience if the configuration of the tale is adapted, and meaning is transformed to fit the relevant social and cultural context. If a parody of a tale does not alter the text to fit the contemporary social context and instead recycles content of traditional narratives, they are to be considered imitating existing stories to affirm traditional ideologies and prolong a conservative message.

=== Development for different audiences ===
To parody a fairy tale for children has some differences than in doing so for adults. For children, tales are retold to make them more comprehensive, to teach simple moral lessons suitable for the contemporary audience or to rouse greater senses of wonder and imagination through alternative endings. When parodying a fairy tale for children, in the form of a fictional picture book, authors often preserve the ‘happy ending’ convention, as a practise governed by a motivation “to enculturate children in societal codes”. For adults, the parodied tale acts as a means for carrying social and political dialogue regarding issues of the time – often with a heavy focus on feminism - a widely acknowledge and important approach to modern tales that allows authors to alter oppressive social representations.

=== Characteristics of the genre ===
Fairy tales have always been hybrid in their nature, borrowing from multiple simple genres – with a key focus on, fables, fantasy, romance, and magical realism - to form their own. Fairy tale parodies further this hybridity, disrupting and defying the traditional form of the tale through the following distinctive characteristics:

1. Chronotope – The chronotope of a fairy tale parody– which refers to “how configurations of time and space are represented in language and discourse” (Bakhtin, 1937) – shifts the fairy tale to a more contemporary setting relevant for a modern audience, making it acceptable for diffusion into the public sphere.
2. Attribute to the supernatural – Authors of fairy tale parodies often “renegotiate the boundary between magic and realism” to coincide with a modern, secular society. When magic is utilised in these retellings, it is often described through the perspective of an unreliable narrator, leaving the audience to question whether magic really occurs, or materialises only through the mind of the protagonist – fitting for a modern society with a greater focus on psychological health.
3. Optimism – as previously stated, many authors of fairy tale parodies for children conform to providing a traditional happy ending, however, writers of parodies with an adult audience, often unmask this illusion, providing a pessimistic ending much more consistent with the harsh realities of society.
4. Intertextuality – When parodying a traditional fairy tale, authors will retain markers of their intertextual relationship with the original text such as numeric symbolism that favoured a patriarchal narrative focus – ‘Damsel in Distress’, ‘Evil Queen’, ‘Knight in Shining Armour’. Through refabricating, rather than removing a character, authors encourage the audience to make a comparison between the traditional and contemporary story and highlight the possibilities of empowering characters that have previously been disparaged or misrepresented.

A good fairy tale parody will maintain recognisable traits of the fairy tale, whilst reimagining certain traits of the genre.

== Contemporary tales ==
The fluid nature of the fairy tale has allowed stories to be adapted over numerous generations and reshaped by different cultures to become more compatible with the sociocultural conditions of the modern day. Fairy tales have the ability to affect the world we are in as "tales are ideologically variable desire machines" and are able to "project possible futures". It is the morphic ability of the tales that allows authors to portray a world or character apt for their time with tales informed by "a human disposition to action – to transform the world and make it more adaptable to human needs" (Zipes, 2002).

During times of war and economic hardship, adaptations of fairy tales were crafted to provide society with hope that life would soon improve. In modern society, fairy tale parodies are written to reflect and suit the cultural and societal shifts of the contemporary world, therefore many topical adaptions have been framed through a feminist lens or with a focus on greater diversity in representation.

=== Feminist retellings ===
Fairy tale parodies are an adaption of their original text, and adaptions "keep their pre-text in play but also reaccentuate or destabilise them, and some relocate them". Since the 1970s, contemporary understandings and social uses of the fairy tale genre have undergone significant change, with feminists debating the "value of fairy tales in shaping of gendered attitudes about self, romance, marriage, family and social power". Traditional fairy tales have been criticised for their one-dimensional gendered character types that reinforce the societal oppression of women. It has been suggested that "the fairy tale characterisations are more powerful than the acts committed by the character" with their characterisations essentially trapping characters into their one-dimensional roles. Female protagonists, often princesses, are characterised by their beauty, innocence and female passivity, all of which are depicted as valued womanly attributes, whilst the female antagonist - the villain, the witch, the evil step mother - is often portrayed as "evil from within, ugly and scheming", reiterating the traditional association between beauty and goodness, and ugly and evil.

Those traditional tales typically depicted female characters through a patriarchal lens, with a happy ending and fulfilment being closely related to "domestic satisfaction" through a heterosexual marriage. The female protagonist receives a happy ending, albeit within the patriarchal constraints of their world and female antagonists who dared to exercise their power and thus place themselves on par with men, where outcast and condemned.

In a modern world, many fairy tales have been parodied in favour of a feminist viewpoint, with feminist retellings being used as agents to elicit social change or provide critical commentary. Feminist authors that have taken to writing their fairy tale parodies through a "woman-centric lens", give voices to heroines and allow the female character to narrate her own story. Through providing female characters with agency, authors are creating three-dimensional beings, fully realised as their own character rather extensions of men.

When parodying a fairy tale for a feminist audience, or through a feminist lens, authors have subverted the stereotypical depictions through role reversal, liberation of characters or mockery/ridicule of past texts. However, literary critics have found that despite ridicule being included in the definitions of parody, the most transformative tales are grounded more deeply in feminism than mockery. Fairy tales are meant to evoke wonder, and therefore if a parodied tale still wants to be considered a 'fairy tale', it needs to maintain that sense of awe and wonder that traditional tales hold. A feminist parody will not ridicule past depictions but instead focus on "what women can be and are, not about how women have been constructed in the past" (Altmann, 2008), empowering modern women, rather than mocking those preceding.

There are, of course, influential feminist fairy tale parodies that are written through satire and exaggeration, such as Anne Sexton's 1971 poetry collection Transformations, that parodies the Grimm's Fairy Tales, however modern tales do not tend to focus on satirisation or sarcasm as their main technique for parody.

Author Robert Coover writes "The future of postmodern feminist fairy tales lies in stories that can rewrite the genre without totally unmaking" and thus when parodying fairy tales, Coover subverted the stereotyped negative ramifications of 'The Stepmother', through the use of first-person narration that encourages readers to identify and sympathise with the character, as the distance between reader and character is diminished. The narration humanises the villain and allows the audience to understand the context and motivation behind her actions, provoking the audience to question whether her actions render names such as 'wicked' or 'evil', and reducing the ability of audiences to categorise characters into their traditionally recognised stereotypes.

=== Modern representation ===
Fairy tales offer a way of both "explaining the world around us and offering a method of imagining a world possible". Traditional fairy tales often featured a transformation or reveal - Cinderella's infamous fairy god-mother makeover, Ariel gaining human legs, and so on - where the character, often female, transforms themselves to fit with societal expectations of beauty, femininity and marital appeal. It is always the character conforming to society, rather than society expanding its definitions of classifications such as 'normal' and 'beautiful'.

In a modern society where fairy tale parodies have grown prominent and have expanded the representation many ill-represented groups in the past, particularly females, the next step for representation regards expanding representation of topics such as masculinity and disability.

Whilst female characters have been provided with more agency in modern fairy tale parodies, the representation of the male protagonist often remains the same - a 2-dimensional, handsome, idyllic husband that in some way, saves the day or an unexpected, dopey outsider who happens to "get the girl." Traditional tales have been constrained by the necessity to conform to the definitions of 'masculinity', however with the definition expanding in the contemporary world, there is a greater focus on gender subverting fairy tale parodies that allow for a broader depiction and characterisation of male characters.

Disability is a lesser explored topic in fairy-tale parodies, however it is a significant topic needing to be explored in further depth. Critics understand that envisioning a fairy tale retelling where a protagonist is not able-bodied, and yet the world is not hostile, or expecting them to adjust to fit into societal norms should be a crucial focus point for future parodies, to assist society in shaping and informing the true ideas of disability, not the stereotyped and negative versions.

== Children's books ==
- Cinderella with Benjy and Bubbles (1978) by Ruth Lerner Perle
- Sleeping Ugly (1981) by Jane Yolen
- Revolting Rhymes (1982) by Roald Dahl
- Jim Henson Presents Goldilocks: Baby Piggy's Dream (1985) by Louise Gikow
- The Giant's Toe (1986) by Brock Cole
- The Adventures of Simple Simon (1987) by Chris Conover
- The True Story of the 3 Little Pigs! (1989) by Jon Scieszka
- Ruby (1990) by Michael Emberley
- The Frog Prince, Continued (1991) by Jon Scieszka
- Cinderella Penguin, or, The Little Glass Flipper (1992) by Janet Perlman
- The Stinky Cheese Man and Other Fairly Stupid Tales (1992) by Jon Scieszka
- The Three Little Wolves and the Big Bad Pig (1993) by Eugene Trivizas
- Politically Correct Bedtime Stories: Modern Tales for Our Life and Times (1994) by James Finn Garner, a collection described as "Adult fractured fairy tales ... still humorous but the humor is for adults"
- Cinder Edna (1994) by Ellen Jackson
- Cinder-Elly (1994) by Frances Minters
- The Book That Jack Wrote (1994) by Jon Scieszka
- Jack and the Meanstalk (1994) by Brian Wildsmith and Rebecca Wildsmith
- A Tale Dark and Grimm (2010), In a Glass Grimmly (2012), and The Grimm Conclusion (2013) by Adam Gidwitz
- The Velveteen Killer Rabbit (2012) by Elia Anie
- Kawoni's Journey Across the Mountain: A Cherokee Little Red Riding Hood (2014) by Cordellya Smith
- Otter's Coat: The Real Reason Turtle Raced Rabbit: A Cherolachian Tortoise and Hare (2021) by Cordellya Smith

== Animated shorts ==
- Some of the early Warner Bros. Looney Tunes and Merrie Melodies cartoons of the 1930s and 1940s featured a number of fairy tales in one form or another, often more than once. These often used were Little Red Riding Hood, The Tortoise and the Hare, The Three Little Pigs, Jack and the Beanstalk and Goldilocks and the Three Bears.
- The "Fractured Fairy Tales" segments on The Rocky and Bullwinkle Show from 1959 to 1961.
- The late 1980s ALF Tales Saturday morning animated series specifically focused on re-interpreting fairy tales in usually non-traditional settings.

== Film ==
- Jack the Giant Killer (1962), a live-action film mocking "Jack and the Beanstalk"
- Ladyhawke (1985), a live-action film poking fun of fairy tale clichés
- The Princess Bride (1987), a live-action film poking fun at fairy tale clichés
- Shrek (2001), an animated film poking fun at fairy tale clichés
- 7 Dwarves – Men Alone in the Wood (2004), a live-action film poking fun at "Snow White" and other fairy tales
- Ella Enchanted (2004), a live-action fairy tale spoof poking fun at "Cinderella"
- Shrek 2 (2004), the second installment in the Shrek series
- Teacher's Pet (2004), an animated film poking fun at The Adventures of Pinocchio
- Chicken Little (2005), an animated sci-fi take on the Henny Penny fable
- Hoodwinked! (2005), an animated mystery-thriller take on "Little Red Riding Hood"
- The Ugly Duckling and Me! (2006), an animated fairy tale take on "The Ugly Duckling"
- Happily N'Ever After (2007), an animated film poking fun at "Cinderella" and other fairy tales
- 7 Dwarves: The Forest Is Not Enough (2007), a live-action film poking fun at "Snow White", "Rumpelstiltskin" and other fairy tales
- Donkey Xote (2007), an animated film poking fun at Don Quixote
- Enchanted (2007), a live-action and animated Disney film poking fun at Disney fairy tale films
- Shrek the Third (2007), the third installment in the Shrek series
- Unstable Fables (2008), a trilogy of direct-to-video animated films poking fun at fairy tales
- Shrek Forever After (2010), the fourth installment in the Shrek series
- Hoodwinked Too! Hood vs. Evil (2011), a spy sequel to Hoodwinked!
- Puss in Boots (2011), a spin-off from the Shrek series about the character Puss, poking fun at the "Puss in Boots" fairy tale
- Tom and Jerry's Giant Adventure (2013), an animated film starring the cartoon characters Tom and Jerry, poking fun at "Jack and the Beanstalk" and other fairy tales
- Into the Woods (2014), a live-action adaptation of the musical play of the same name
- Strange Magic (2015), an animated film mocking Beauty and the Beast and A Midsummer Night's Dream
- Secret Magic Control Agency (2021), an animated spy take on "Hansel and Gretel"
- Disenchanted (2022), a sequel to Enchanted
- Puss in Boots: The Last Wish (2022), a sequel to Puss in Boots

== See also ==
- Fairy tale
- Disney animated films
- Pantomime
