= Flying Jake =

1988 picture book by Lane Smith

- Author: Lane Smith
- Cover artist: Smith
- Language: English
- Subject: Birds, Imagination
- Genre: children's books picture books
- Publisher: Macmillan Publishing Company/Viking Children's Books
- Publication date: 1988
- Publication place: United States of America
- Pages: 32
- ISBN: 978-0-689-80376-5
- OCLC: 34530605

Flying Jake is a children's picture book by Lane Smith. It was originally published in 1988 by Macmillan Publishing Company and reprinted by Viking Press in 1996. In this wordless story, a boy named Jake takes flight in pursuit of his pet bird, which has flown out of its cage and through a window. Flying Jake was the first independent work by Smith, who later illustrated The True Story of the 3 Little Pigs! and The Stinky Cheese Man and Other Fairly Stupid Tales.

== Reception ==
The book received mixed reviews. In The New York Times, Signe Wilkinson called it "a rich picture poem that gives readers of any age a certain feeling about flight among the birds." Several teachers' guides have also recommended the book for use in grade school classrooms. However, Carol McMichael of School Library Journal criticized Flying Jake for its "busy, confused story and bizarre illustrations."
