= The Princess and the Pea =

Fairy tale by Hans Christian Andersen

- Short story by Hans Christian Andersen
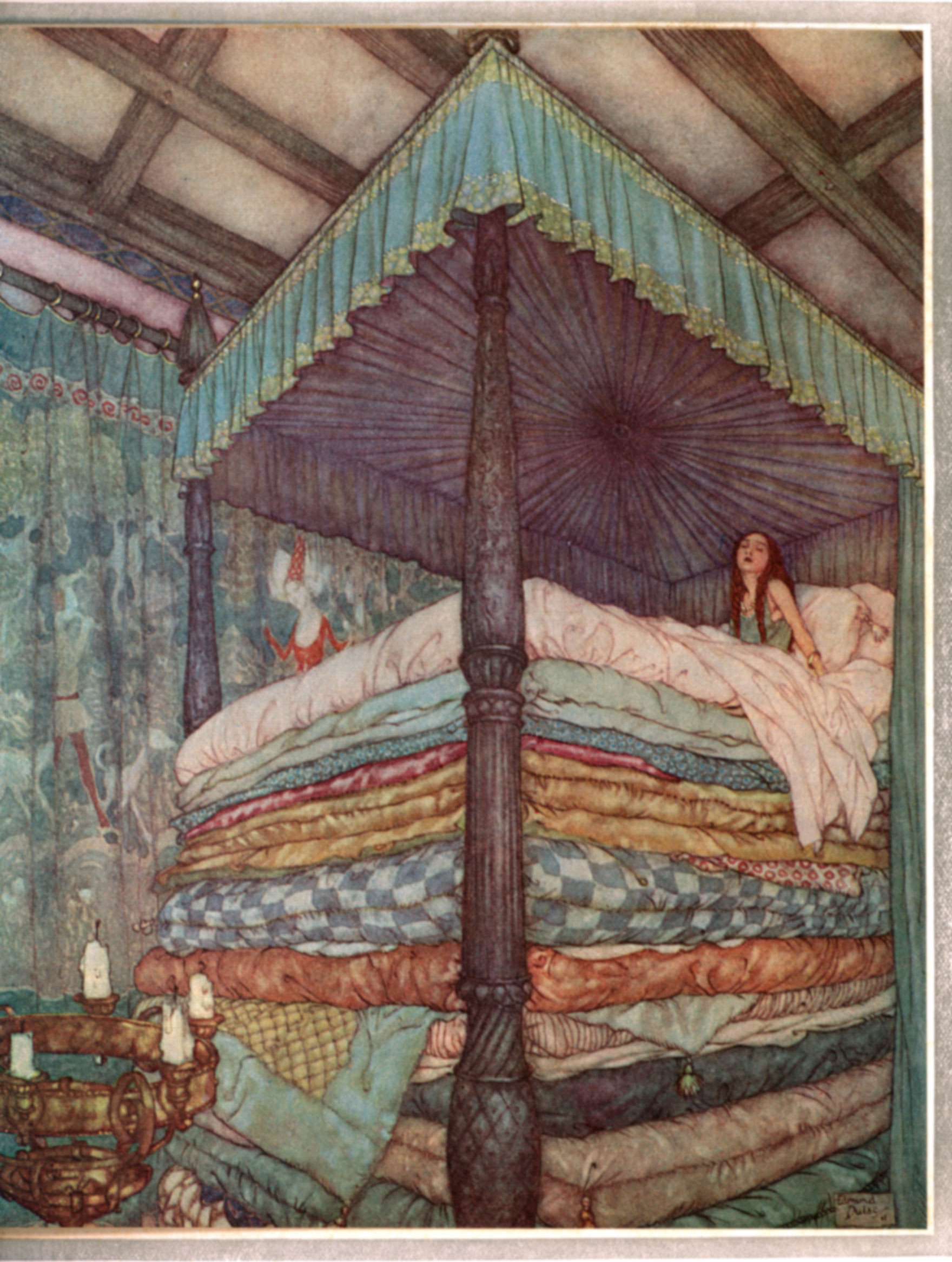
- 1911 Illustration by Edmund Dulac

Text available at Wikisource
- Original title: Prinsessen på Ærten
- Translator: Charles Boner
- Country: Denmark
- Language: Danish
- Genre: Literary fairy tale

Publication
- Published in: Tales, Told for Children. First Collection. First Booklet. 1835.
- Publication type: Fairy tale collection
- Publisher: C.A. Reitzel
- Media type: Print
- Publication date: 8 May 1835
- Published in English: 1846 in A Danish Story-Book

"The Princess and the Pea" (Danish: Prinsessen på Ærten, lit. 'The Princess on the Pea') is a literary fairy tale by Hans Christian Andersen about a princess who is tested to become the wife to a lonely prince. The tale was first published with three others by Andersen in a cheap booklet on 8 May 1835 in Copenhagen by C. A. Reitzel.

The tale is classified in the Aarne–Thompson–Uther Index as ATU 704, "The Princess and the Pea".

== Plot ==
The story tells of a prince who wants to marry a princess but is having difficulty finding a suitable wife. He meets many princesses, but is never sure that they are real (Danish: rigtig, lit. 'rightful') princesses—until one stormy night, when a mysterious young woman drenched with rain seeks shelter in the prince's castle. She claims to be a princess, but the prince's mother, the queen, has doubts. She decides to test their unexpected guest by placing a hard uncooked pea in the bed she is offered for the night, covered by twenty mattresses and twenty featherbeds.

In the morning, the mysterious woman tells her hosts that she endured a rather restless night, kept awake by something in the bed that made her feel uncomfortable. The prince's family realizes that she is a princess after all, since only a true princess could be so delicate. The prince and the princess are happily married, and the story ends with the pea being placed in a museum, where it might still remain.

== Commentaries ==
Researcher Jack Zipes said that Andersen, during his lifetime, "was obliged to act as a dominated subject within the dominant social circles despite his fame and recognition as a writer." He therefore had a mixed opinion of the upper classes, at the same time aspiring to them and scorning them. According to Zipes and other writers, this tendency found expression in Andersen's stories, where people such as the princess undergo ordeals to prove their virtuousness.

While a 1905 article in the American Journal of Education recommended the story for children aged 8–10, "The Princess and the Pea" was not uniformly well received by critics. Toksvig wrote in 1934, "[the story] seems to the reviewer not only indelicate but indefensible, in so far as the child might absorb the false idea that great ladies must always be so terribly thin-skinned."

"The Princess and the Pea" spurred on positive criticism, as well. In fact, critic Paul Hazard pointed out the realistic aspects of the fairy tale that make it easily relatable to all people. He believed that "the world Andersen witnessed—which encompassed sorrow, death, evil and man's follies—is reflected in his tales," and most evidently in "The Princess and the Pea." Another scholar, Niels Kofoed, noticed that “since they involve everyday-life themes of love, death, nature, injustice, suffering and poverty, they appeal to all races, ideologies, classes and genders.” Moreover, Celia Catlett Anderson realized that one of the things that makes this story so appealing and relatable is that optimism prevails over pessimism, especially for the main character of the princess. This inspires hope in the readers for their own futures and strength within themselves.

== Adaptations ==
In 1927, Austrian composer Ernst Toch published an opera based on "The Princess and the Pea", with a libretto by Benno Elkan. Reportedly this opera was very popular in the American student repertoires; the music, as well as the English translation (by Marion Farquhar), were praised in a review in Notes.

The story was adapted to the musical stage in 1959 as Once Upon a Mattress, with comedian Carol Burnett playing the play's heroine, Princess Winnifred the Woebegone.

In 1961, The Princess and the Pea was made into a television film starring Samantha Eggar.

The musical was revived in 1997 with Sarah Jessica Parker in the role.

It was revived again in 2024 with Sutton Foster in the role of Winnifred.

A television adaptation of "The Princess and the Pea" starred Liza Minnelli in a Faerie Tale Theatre episode in 1984. One short cartoon established that the princess was told about the pea in advance by other parties and just pretended to have a bad night so that she could deceive the queen the following morning.

The story has been adapted into three films, a six-minute IMAX production in 2001, one full-length animation film in 2002 and the 2005 feature-length movie featuring Carol Burnett and Zooey Deschanel. The tale was the basis for a story in The Stinky Cheese Man and Other Fairly Stupid Tales by Jon Scieszka and Lane Smith, wherein the prince decides to slip a bowling ball underneath one hundred mattresses after three years of unsuccessful attempts with the pea. In the morning, the princess comes downstairs and tells the queen, "This might sound odd but I think you need another mattress. I felt like I was sleeping on a lump as big as a bowling ball." satisfying the king and the queen. The princess marries the prince and they live happily, though maybe not entirely honestly, ever after. American poet Jane Shore published a poem, "The Princess and the Pea", in the January 1973 issue of Poetry, in which a close dependency between princess and pea is posited: "I lie in my skin as in an ugly coat: / my body owned by the citizens / who ache and turn whenever I turn / on the pea on which so much depends" (13-16). Russian writer Evgeny Shvarts incorporates the story, with two other Andersen stories, in his Naked King.

== Similar tales ==
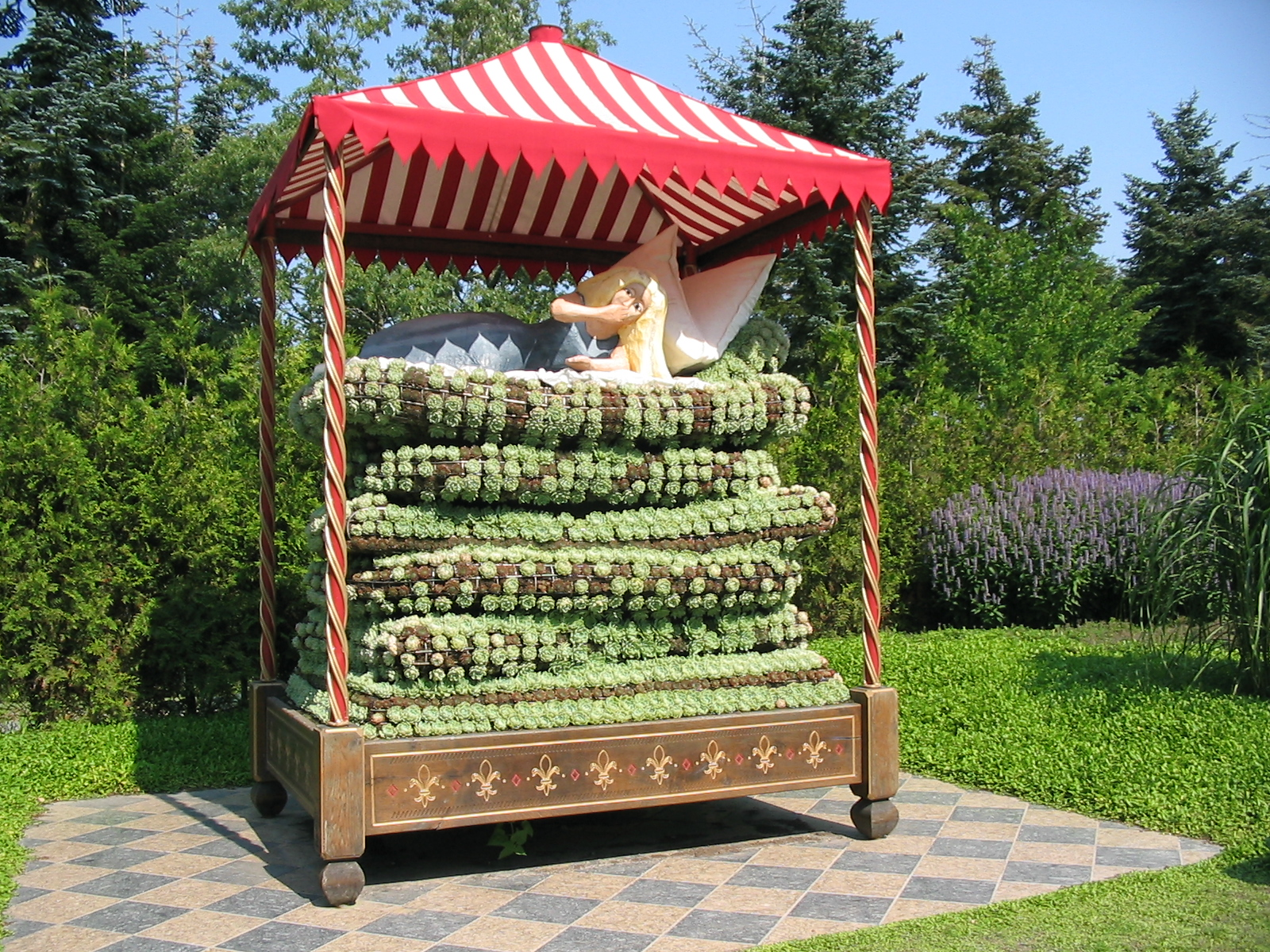
The Princess and the Pea in the Danish floral park Jesperhus

A few folk tales feature a boy discovering a pea or a bean assumed to be of great value. After the boy enters a castle and is given a bed of straw for the night he tosses and turns in his sleep, attempting to guard his treasure. Some observers are persuaded that the boy is restless because he is unaccustomed to sleeping on straw and is therefore of aristocratic blood. In the more popular versions of the tale, only one pea is used. However, Charles Boner added in two more peas in his translation of the story upon which Andersen based his tale. Other differences amongst versions can be seen in various numbers of mattresses as well as feather beds. Versions of the story differ based on whether or not the character of the helper is included. The helper, in some cases, tells the princess to pretend she slept badly. In other versions, the helper does not appear at all and the princess decides to lie all on her own. A similar fairy tale, The Pea Test (Die Erbsenprobe), was included by the Brothers Grimm in 1843 at number 182 in the fifth edition of their collection Children's and Household Tales, but was removed from subsequent editions.

== Board game ==
Princess and the Pea is a children's board game loosely based on "The Princess and the Pea", in which each player tries to build the highest stack of mattresses before reaching the final space on the board. It was first published by Winning Moves Games USA in 2003 and was republished in 2008—but is no longer in production.

Each player moves their bed across the board, and tried to build the tallest bed by stacking their mattresses as high as possible.

== See also ==
- Al-Nadirah

== In popular culture ==
Princess Pea from the PBS Kids children’s series Super Why! (2007–2016) is the daughter of the prince and princess of that story, Princess Pea turns into Princess Presto with spelling power.
