= Time Warp Trio =

Canadian-American television series

- Created by: Jon Scieszka
- Based on: The Time Warp Trio by Jon Scieszka; Lane Smith (illustrator)
- Developed by: Pierre Valette
- Voices of: Mark Rendall; Darren Frost; Scott McCord; Sarah Gadon (episodes 2–14); Tajja Isen (episodes 20–26); Sunday Muse; Laurie Elliott; Annick Obonsawin; Tony Daniels
- Opening theme: "Time Warp Trio" by Riddlin' Kids
- Composer: Eggplant Productions Inc.
- Countries of origin: Canada; United States
- No. of seasons: 1
- No. of episodes: 26

Production
- Executive producers: Carol Greenwald; Dorothea Gillim
- Producers: Jacqui Deegan; Patrick Downie; David Trexler
- Running time: 22 minutes
- Production companies: WGBH Boston; Soup2Nuts

Original release
- Network: Discovery Kids
- Release: July 9, 2005 – July 15, 2006

Related
- Xavier Riddle and the Secret Museum; WordGirl

Time Warp Trio is an animated children's television series based on the children's book series of the same name. Created by Jon Scieszka, the series was produced by WGBH Boston and animated by Soup2Nuts. The series aired from July 9, 2005, to July 15, 2006, on Discovery Kids and its Saturday morning block on NBC. In June 2007, WGBH announced that the series was going to receive a second season; however, the series had ended, and the planned season never occurred.

== Plot ==
For his tenth birthday, Joe receives a mysterious blue book (known only as "The Book") from his magician uncle, Joe the Magnificent. By reading the book, Joe and his friends, Sam and Fred, are - often accidentally - transported to various times and places throughout history, such as Ancient Egypt and the Old West. In the year 2105, the trio meets their own great-granddaughters, Jodie, Samantha, and Freddi.

After each time warp, the group must find and use the Book to return to the present day. Later in the series, Joe's evil uncle, Mad Jack, makes several attempts to capture the children and The Book with crafty tricks, such as stranding them in Antarctica (since the Book does not work there).

== Characters ==
=== Main ===
- Joseph "Joe" Arthur (voiced by Mark Rendall) is an up-and-coming magician and the present-day owner of the Book. At one point, Joe is awarded the title of Time Page, and he is said to eventually become a Warp Wizard. In the future, Joe will face Mad Jack in a great battle that will determine the fate of time itself.
- Samuel "Sam" Kikin (voiced by Darren Frost) is a friend of Joe and Fred who solves problems using intelligence and historical knowledge. Depicted as being a stereotypical nerd, he wears glasses and has multiple allergies. Sam is an amateur scientist and inventor; Freddi states that he will invent something very important in the future.
- Frederick "Fred" McGrew (voiced by Scott McCord) is a friend of Joe and Sam who is fun-loving, teasing, and headstrong, often to the point of idiocy. Fred is the most interested in using the Book for material gains, whether hunting for treasure or patenting future technology.
- Jodie Arthur (voiced by Sarah Gadon until episode 15; voiced by Tajja Isen starting with episode 20) is Joe's great-granddaughter from the year 2105. She is an aspiring fashion designer who is known for being bossy, rude, condescending, and complaining a lot. Jodie is referred to as a "third-level warper" and demonstrates great mastery over the Book.
- Samantha Kikin (voiced by Laurie Elliott) is Sam's great-granddaughter from the year 2105. She, like Fred, is known for being teasing, funny, impulsive, and headstrong – the exact opposite of Sam (though like Sam, she can be sensitive at times). Samantha has a pet robot cat named Rivites and owns a time-traveling pocket watch created by Sam.
- Freida "Freddi" McGrew (voiced by Sunday Muse) is Fred's great-granddaughter from the year 2105. She is very friendly and sweet-natured, but also shy, malleable, sensitive, and seems to be the exact opposite of Fred.

=== Recurring ===
- Anna Arthur (voiced by Annick Obonsawin) is Joe's annoying younger sister, who seems to have greater knowledge of The Book than her brother.
- Joe the Magnificent (voiced by Tony Daniels) is Joe's uncle and namesake, a would-be magician who fails at live performances. He sent his nephew Joe the Book, which he did not know how to use, and instead traverses time and space with an enchanted pocket watch.
- Mad Jack (voiced by Tony Daniels) is the evil brother of Joe the Magnificent and Lila Arthur. He is intent on stealing the Book so that he can be the sole ruler of eternity. Jack travels through time and space using a scepter.
- Lila Arthur (voiced by Susan Roman) is Joe and Anna's mother. She knows how to use the Book, being the one to originally give it to her brother.
- Ronald Arthur is Joe and Anna's father. He is a world-famous archeologist.
- Mike McGrew (voiced by Dan Petronijevic) is Fred's older brother.

=== Historical characters ===
- Blackbeard (voiced by Cal Dodd)
- Israel Hands (voiced by Bill Colgate)
- Genghis Khan (child, voiced by Daniel DeSanto)
- Thutmose III
- Tokugawa Ieyasu (voiced by Denis Akiyama)
- Emperor Hadrian
- Meriwether Lewis (voiced by Ted Atherton)
- William Clark (voiced by Don Dickinson)
- Sacagawea (voiced by Stephanie Morgenstern)
- Erik the Red (voiced by Tony Daniels)
- Leif Erikson (voiced by Robert Norman Smith)
- Thomas Edison (voiced by Michael Therriault)
- Emily Warren Roebling
- Black Kettle
- Napoleon Bonaparte (voiced by Paul Essiembre)
- Sophie Blanchard (voiced by Stephanie Martin)
- Nebuchadnezzar II (voiced by Juan Chioran)
- Queen Jinga (voiced by Alison Sealy Smith)
- Plato
- Li Shimin
- Peter the Great
- Alexander Kikin
- Mary Shelley (voiced by Vickie Papavs)
- Lord Byron
- Leonardo da Vinci
- Robert Falcon Scott (voiced by Michael Fletcher)
- Amelia Earhart
- Selim II
- William Montagu
- Agnes Randolph (voiced by Corrine Koslo)

== Episodes ==
No.	Title	Time	Written by	Place	Trio combination	Original release date
1	"The Not-So-Jolly Roger"	1718	Steve Granat and Cydne Clark	North Carolina	Joe, Sam, and Fred	July 9, 2005
Fred wishes for buried treasure after Joe receives the Book for his tenth birthday, and the boys find themselves facing down the pirate Blackbeard.
2	"2105"	2105, the future	Kathy Waugh	Brooklyn, New York	Joe, Sam, and Fred	July 16, 2005
A class trip to the Natural History Museum ends up transporting the boys one hundred years into the future. The Trio run into ray gun-toting robots and meet three mysterious girls who turn out to be their own great-granddaughters. Based on the Time Warp Trio book 2095.
3	"You Can't, But Genghis Khan"	1170	Steve Granat and Cydne Clark	Outer Mongolia	Joe, Sam, and Fred	July 23, 2005
Fred, Joe and Sam travel back to experience life and culture in Mongolia in the 12th century, and pair up with 9-year-old Temüjin — the future Genghis Khan.
4	"Tut Tut"	1470 BC	Kathy Waugh	Ancient Egypt	Joe, Sam, and Fred	July 30, 2005
The Trio accidentally warps to Ancient Egypt where they meet a 10-year-old Thutmose III.
5	"Sam Samurai"	1615	Peter K. Hirsch and Nick Raposo	Japan	Joe, Sam, and Fred	August 6, 2005
An accidental haiku sends Sam, Joe and Fred back to Japan in the middle of the Tokugawa shogunate. They meet a samurai named Honda and the evil Owatabut of Yomama who attempts to get rid of the great leader Tokugawa Ieyasu.
6	"See You Later, Gladiator!"	120 AD	Kathy Waugh	Rome, Italy	Joe, Sam, and Fred	August 13, 2005
The Book transports Joe, Sam, and Fred back to Ancient Rome in the 2nd century AD— and face-to-face with one gladiator. Based on the book of the same name.
7	"Lewis and Clark... and Jodie, Freddi, and Samantha"	1805	Gentry Menzel	Rocky Mountains	Jodie, Samantha, and Freddi	August 20, 2005
The girls' wish for a camping trip transports them back to join Lewis and Clark on the first U.S. overland expedition to the Pacific coast where they meet Sacagawea.
8	"Viking It and Liking It"	1001 AD	Peter K. Hirsch	Greenland	Joe, Sam, and Fred	August 27, 2005
The boys want to play Vikings Football Smashfest, but instead find themselves in AD 1001 amidst real Vikings, including Leif Erikson. The boys accompany Ericson on his voyage to North America.
9	"Hey Kid, Want to Buy a Bridge?"	1879	Gary Apple	Brooklyn, New York	Joe, Sam, and Fred	September 3, 2005
Joe, Fred and Sam transport back to New York City near the late 19th century and meet Emily Roebling, the woman who helped with the construction of the Brooklyn Bridge. However something goes wrong with the warp, and Sam somehow has Thomas Edison's plans to manipulate electricity in his head.
10	"Me Oh Maya"	960 AD	Glen Berger	Chichen Itza, Mexico	Joe, Sam, and Fred	October 1, 2005
The boys transport to Chichen Itza, Mexico in the middle of a Maya ringball court a thousand years ago, where they must compete in the game. Based on the book of the same name.
11	"The Good, the Bad, and the Goofy"	1868	Peter K. Hirsch	Western United States	Joe, Sam, and Fred	October 8, 2005
The Trio travel back to the Old West where they must survive a stampede, a band of Cheyenne with their leader Black Kettle, and a full-blown charge of Custer's Seventh Cavalry.
12	"Able Was I Ere I Saw Elba"	1815	Peter K. Hirsch	Paris, France	Joe, Fred, and Samantha	January 7, 2006
Fred and Joe transport to 1815 Paris and meet Napoleon Bonaparte. Samantha is also there with pioneering aeronaut Sophie Blanchard. However Napoleon gets his hands on the Book and learns how to win The Battle of Waterloo, where he continues to conquer through the USA.
13	"The Seven Blunders of the World"	580 BC	Gary Apple	Iraq	Joe, Sam, and Fred	January 14, 2006
Deeming the Book too dangerous Joe locks it up. However a Babylonian thief steals it on orders of Mad Jack. Accidentally warped to Babylon, the trio meet King Nebuchadnezzar II and Queen Amyitis, the creators of the Hanging Gardens of Babylon.
14	"Jinga All the Way"	1624	Lazar Saric	Angola, Africa	Jodie, Sam, and Fred	January 21, 2006
Jodie, Sam and Fred land in 17th century Angola. They join the fierce Queen Jinga and battle warring tribes in a trek along the Kwanza River on their way to a historic meeting with the Portuguese governor.
15	"Birdman or Birdbrain?"	1765	Glen Berger	Rapa Nui	Freddi, Samantha, and Fred	February 4, 2006
When The Book's pages transform into rongorongo script, Freddi, Samantha, and Fred transport back in time to Rapa Nui (a.k.a. Easter Island). Eventually, Freddi must jump off a cliff and, swim through shark-infested waters to the Birdman's Island (Motu Nui).
16	"Dude, Where's My Karma?"	720 AD	Peter K. Hirsch	India	None (although Joe narrates, Sam and Fred warp without him)	February 11, 2006
When Joe realizes that he's slowly disappearing, the kids find a malfunction in his family tree in The Book and follow it to India. Sam, Fred, Samantha and Freddi have to help Joe's ancestor Prince Karna win the hand of Princess Lakshmi to save the entire family line.
17	"My Big Fat Greek Olympics"	404 BC	Glen Berger	Greece	Fred, Samantha, and Sam	February 18, 2006
A wild warp at the Olympia Diner sends Fred and Samantha to Ancient Greece during the Olympic games where they must team up with philosopher Plato to help avoid a historical disaster.
18	"Wushu Were Here"	621 AD	Raye Lankford	Shu China	Joe, Fred, and Anna	February 25, 2006
Sam gets trapped inside The Book, and Anna, Fred and Joe travel back to the Tang dynasty in China in 621 AD to figure out how to get him out. En route they help the Shaolin Monks rescue General Li Shimin from prison, travel past the beginnings of the Great Wall, learn about the teachings of Chan Buddhism, and confront Mad Jack.
19	"What's So Great About Peter?"	1698	Matt Steinglass	Moscow, Russia	Samantha, Sam, and Fred	March 18, 2006
Sam's Grandpa Dima tells some big stories to Sam, Fred and Samantha about his ancestor, Alexander Kikin, but the crew is skeptical. Fred and Samantha convince Sam to travel back to Russia, where they save Kikin (a member of the Russian guardsmen, the Streltsy), from the wrath of Peter the Great.
20	"The Caveman Catastrophe"	51,000 BC	Gary Apple	Germany	Jodie, Sam, and Fred	July 15, 2006
When the kids warp back to the Stone Age, they manage to decipher some cave paintings and find The Book in the camp of the Neanderthals. However, when they trade Jodie's binoculars to get it back, something goes wrong, and the kids become hairy.
21	"Nightmare on Joe's Street"	1816	Peter K. Hirsch	Switzerland	Joe, Sam, and Jodie	July 15, 2006
Frankenstein's monster has escaped from Mary Shelley's imagination and is wreaking havoc in Joe's apartment in Brooklyn. Joe, Sam, and Jodie transport the monster to 1816 Switzerland.
22	"Breaking the Codex"	1503	Jonathan Greenberg	Florence, Italy	Joe, Jodie, and Freddi	July 15, 2006
Jodie and Freddi unexpectedly grab Joe and transport him to 1503 in Italy at the height of the Renaissance. They must rescue the artist, scientist and inventor Leonardo da Vinci from Mad Jack who has gotten the idea that Da Vinci can help Mad Jack create his own time-traveling book.
23	"Break an Egg"	1911	Kathy Waugh	Antarctica	Joe, Sam, and Fred	July 15, 2006
Joe, Sam and Fred transport to 1911 Antarctica where they encounter Robert Falcon Scott at the Terra Nova Expedition. They endure extreme cold, eat hoosh (seal liver), and discover that Mad Jack has brought them to the one place on Earth that's too cold for The Book to work.
24	"The High and the Flighty"	1937	Peter K. Hirsch	Miami, Florida	Jodie, Samantha, and Freddi	July 15, 2006
The girls hear a mysterious radio transmission, which Freddi recognizes as the voice of her heroine, pilot Amelia Earhart, who is broadcasting a distress message on her last flight. The girls transport to 1937 and try to solve the mystery of Amelia's disappearance on her attempted around-the-world flight.
25	"Harem Scare'm"	1540	Glen Berger	Istanbul, Turkey	Sam, Fred, and Jodie	July 15, 2006
Jodie talks Sam and Fred into traveling to the Ottoman Empire, location of the Time Map, which will reveal the location of the Book in any time period. On arrival, they meet Selim II, Suleiman the Magnificent's son, and his wily monkey, Dimples.
26	"Plaid to the Bone"	1338	Peter K. Hirsch	Medieval Scotland	Joe, Jodie, and Anna	July 15, 2006
In the series finale, Joe, Jodie, and Anna are flung from a trebuchet and hurtling towards the Dunbar Castle in Scotland during a siege in 1338 led by William Montagu, 1st Earl of Salisbury. However, when the kids meet Agnes Randolph and Uncle Joe in the dungeon, they realize much more is at stake. Joe watches Uncle Joe and Mad Jack battle it out over the fate of the universe and it's up to the kids to save the timeline.

== Broadcast ==
Time Warp Trio aired on Discovery Kids and premiered in the United States on July 9, 2005. The final episode aired on July 15, 2006. It also aired as part of a three-hour Discovery Kids block on NBC until September 2, 2006. After the series ended, reruns aired on The Hub until June 27, 2011.

It also aired on TVOKids in Canada, CBBC in the United Kingdom and Ireland, Cartoon Network in Australia and New Zealand, and HBO Family & Cartoon Network in Southeast Asia. It was also dubbed into Hebrew under the title "מלכודת הזמן" and aired on Logi and Arutz HaYeladim, the series was also aired in South Korea on EBS under the name "시간 여행 삼총사" with Korean subtitles. It also aired in Portugal on RTP2 (formerly 2), where it was dubbed into Portuguese under the title "Trio no Tempo", it also aired in Italy on DeA Kids.

Even though it was produced by PBS station WGBH, Time Warp Trio was not broadcast on PBS in the United States. However, the show is distributed internationally through PBS International and aired on PBS Kids in Africa.

== In other media ==
=== Comics ===
- Nightmare on Joe's Street
- The Seven Blunders of the World
- Plaid to the Bone
- Meet you at Waterloo ("Able Was I, Ere I Saw Elba")

=== Chapter books ===
- You Can't, But Genghis Khan
- Lewis and Clark...and Jodie, Freddi, and Samantha
- Wushu Were Here
