= Tomorrow Most Likely =

2019 picture book by Dave Eggers

- Author: Dave Eggers
- Illustrator: Lane Smith
- Genre: children's books picture books
- Publisher: Chronicle Books
- Publication date: 2019

Tomorrow Most Likely is a children's book written by Dave Eggers and illustrated by Lane Smith. Released by Chronicle Books in 2019, it is the story of a boy, tucked into bed, thinking of all the things he would see and do tomorrow.
