= Glasses (disambiguation) =

Glasses are eyewear to aid vision.

Glasses may also refer to:

- Glass, a class of amorphous solids
- Glasses (album), a 1977 live album by Joe McPhee
- "Glasses" (IU song), from the 2015 EP Chat-Shire
- "Glasses" (Paul McCartney song), from the 1970 album McCartney
- Glasses (film), a 2001 Canadian animated short film
- Glasses (pastry) or palmier, a French pastry
- "Glasses" (short story), an 1896 short story by Henry James
- Glasses Malone (Ivory Penniman, born 1978), American rapper
- "The Glasses", a 1993 episode of the American sitcom Seinfeld
- Glasses (Who Needs 'Em?), a 1991 children's picture book by Lane Smith

== See also ==
- List of glassware
