= 2095 (disambiguation) =

2095 is a year in the 2090s decade

2095 may also refer to

- The year 2095 BC in the 21st century BC
- 2095 (number), the number
- 2095 (novel), children's book by Jon Scieszka in The Time Warp series
- 2095 Parsifal, a main belt asteroid
