= Three Little Wolves =

Three Little Wolves may refer to:

- Three Little Wolves (film), a 1936 Disney animated cartoon
- The Three Little Wolves and the Big Bad Pig, a 1993 picture book
