= Squids Will Be Squids =

Book by Jon Scieszka

- Author: Jon Scieszka, Lane Smith
- Cover artist: Lane Smith
- Language: English
- Genre: children's book
- Publisher: Viking Press
- Publication date: 1998
- Publication place: United States
- Pages: 48
- ISBN: 978-0-670-88135-2
- OCLC: 39002874
- Dewey Decimal: [E] 21
- LC Class: PZ8.2.S37 Sq 1998

Squids Will Be Squids is a children's picture book written by Jon Scieszka and illustrated by Lane Smith. It was released in 1998 by Viking Press.

== Reception ==
Roger Sutton, of Horn Book Magazine, reviewed the book saying, "The humor is definitely juvenile and wears a little thin, but Scieszka has perfect pitch when it comes to this kind of thing ("Moral: He who smelt it, dealt it"), and Smith's portraits find the humanity behind the masks".
