= The Time Warp Trio =

Novel series by Jon Scieszka

- Cover of the Gift Set featuring multiple books.
- Author: Jon Scieszka
- Illustrator: Lane Smith; Adam McCauley
- Cover artist: Lane Smith; Adam McCauley
- Country: United States
- Language: English
- Genre: Children's fiction
- Publisher: Viking Press (US); Puffin Books (UK)
- Published: 1991 – 2006
- Media type: Print

The Time Warp Trio is a children's fantasy fiction book series written by Jon Scieszka, published between 1991 and 2006. Illustrated by Lane Smith and Adam McCauley, the books follow the adventures of three boys – Joe, Sam, and Fred – who travel through time and space with the aid of a mysterious object known as "The Book". The first book, Knights of the Kitchen Table, was published in 1991.

An animated television adaptation was produced by WGBH Boston and Soup2Nuts and aired on Discovery Kids (later, The Hub).

== Plot ==
For his birthday, Joe receives a mysterious blue book (known only as "The Book") from his magician uncle and namesake, "Joe the Magnificent". Using a number of often unpredictable and/or unintentional voice and print cues, The Book frequently transports Joe and his friends, Fred and Sam, to a variety of different times and places, from Camelot's medieval court of knights and dragons to the year 2095, where they meet their own great-granddaughters. The only way they are able to return to present-day Brooklyn, New York is to find The Book again within whatever time period they are in. Anna, Joe's sister, is also always eager to have the book (which is quite annoying to Joe). During their travels, Joe and his friends learn that The Book will eventually be inherited by Joe's great-granddaughter, Jodie, who time travels with The Book with her friends who are Sam and Fred's great-granddaughters, Samantha and Freddi, and occasionally save the boys from trouble when their paths cross. The Time Warp Trio faces many challenges during their travels as they learn how to use The Book.

== Characters ==
- Joseph "Joe" Arthur – An up-and-coming magician and the present-day owner of The Book, Joe is the unofficial leader of The Time Warp Trio. While his penchant for keeping The Book with him and experimenting with it results in many of their adventures, his talent for magical tricks also helps them out of many tough situations. Joseph is crafty, cunning, smooth and suave.
- Samuel "Sam" – A friend of Joe and Fred who contributes his intelligence and historical knowledge to the group's problems. He wears thick glasses (he is self-conscious about being a nerd) and is lactose intolerant. Sam is also wary of time travel; he is convinced their doom is imminent every time they open The Book. An amateur inventor, he is told by Freddi that he will invent something very important in the future (though it is not revealed what). He can be passive-aggressive at times.
- Frederick "Fred" – A friend of Joe and Sam. Fred is a sports fan who is headstrong, sometimes to the point of idiocy. Fred is the most interested in using The Book for material gains, whether hunting for treasure or patenting future technology. He has a bullying older brother named Mike.
- Joe the Magnificent – Joe's uncle, a would-be magician who fails at live performances. He originally sent The Book to Joe, since he could not make it work - he performs his own time travel by means of an enchanted pocket watch. He believes in the Tooth Fairy and the Easter Bunny.
- Mrs. Arthur – Joe's mother, a sometimes short-tempered woman. She understands how to use The Book, originally giving it to her brother (Joe's uncle) and later showing her son the page for choosing the specific time to visit.
- Anna Arthur – Joe's annoying younger sister, who is revealed to have a better understanding of The Book than her brother does.
- Jodie – Joe's great-granddaughter from the year 2095, who occasionally crosses paths with the trio, along with her friends Samantha and Freddi (all three have a great mastery of The Book). Jodie is usually concerned with her looks or any way to make herself more comfortable in any situation, yet she looks out for her friends as they do for her. Because she and Fred have pretty stubborn personalities, they usually butt heads at some point when the other is around or attempting to take charge. She is sometimes called Jo or J.
- Samantha – Sam's great-granddaughter from the year 2095. Unlike her great grandpa, Samantha is not as erratically apprehensive whenever she finds herself back in time, even when faced with a dilemma. Samantha owns a time-traveling pocket watch that belonged to Sam. She is sometimes called Samm or Samza.
- Freida "Freddi" – Fred's great-granddaughter from the year 2095. She wears a baseball hat, as her great-grandfather did. Unlike her great grandfather she fears heights and bugs.
- Michael "Mike" - Fred's mean older brother who appears in "Viking It and Liking It".

== Media ==
=== Books ===
1. Knights of the Kitchen Table (King Arthur) (1991)
2. The Not-So-Jolly Roger (Blackbeard) (1991)
3. The Good, the Bad, and the Goofy (The Wild West) (1992)
4. Your Mother Was a Neanderthal (Prehistory) (1993)
5. 2095 (The Future) (1995)
6. Tut, Tut (Ancient Egypt) (1996)
7. Summer Reading Is Killing Me! (Children's literature) (1998)
8. It's All Greek to Me (Ancient Greece) (1999)
9. See You Later, Gladiator (Ancient Rome) (2000)
10. Sam Samurai (17th-century Japan) (2001)
11. Hey Kid, Want to Buy a Bridge? (New York City, 1877, Thomas Edison) (2002)
12. Viking It and Liking It (The Vikings) (2002)
13. Me Oh Maya! (Maya civilization) (2003)
14. Da Wild, Da Crazy, Da Vinci (Leonardo da Vinci) (2004)
15. Oh Say, I Can't See (George Washington) (2005)
16. Marco? Polo! (Marco Polo) (2006)

=== Television series ===
A TV series based on the books debuted on July 9, 2005, as a production by Soup 2 Nuts, in association with WGBH Boston, and initially aired on Discovery Kids and TVOKids.
