= The Big Pets =

1991 book by Lane Smith

- Author: Lane Smith
- Genre: children's books picture books
- Publisher: Viking Books
- Publication date: 1991
- Publication place: United States
- Pages: 32
- ISBN: 978-0-14-054265-3
- OCLC: 27810316
- Dewey Decimal: [E] 20
- LC Class: PZ7.S6538 Bi 1993

The Big Pets is a children's picture book written and illustrated by Lane Smith. It was originally published in 1991 by Viking Books.

== Plot ==
Lane Smith's pictures depict a dreamscape where gigantic pets frolic with their small young owners in a succession of fantasy environments.

== Award ==
This book received a Golden Apple of Bratislava.
