= Helen Oxenbury =

English illustrator and writer of children's picture books (born 1938)

- Born: Helen Gillian Oxenbury; 2 June 1938 (age 88); Ipswich, Suffolk, England
- Known for: Illustrations
- Style: Watercolour
- Spouse: John Burningham (m. 1964; died 2019)
- Website: helenoxenbury.co.uk

Helen Gillian Oxenbury (born 2 June 1938) is an English illustrator and writer of children's picture books. She lives in north London. She has twice won the annual Kate Greenaway Medal, the British librarians' award for illustration and been runner-up four times. (Note: Since 1995 there are usually eight books on the Greenaway shortlist. According to CCSU, there were 31 "Highly Commended" runners up for the Greenaway Medal in 29 years from 1974 to 2002, including Oxenbury alone in 1989, 1991, 1993, and 1994. No one has won three Greenaways. Among the fourteen illustrators with two Medals, Oxenbury is one of seven with one book named to the top ten (1955–2005). No one else was highly commended more than twice.) For the 50th anniversary of that Medal (1955–2005) her 1999 illustrated edition of Alice's Adventures in Wonderland was named one of the top ten winning works.

== Background ==
Oxenbury was born and raised in Ipswich, Suffolk. Her father was an architect. From an early age, she developed a passion for drawing. After leaving school, she attended the Ipswich School of Art as a teenager, and during holidays she worked at a small theatre in Felixstowe and at the Ipswich Repertory Theatre Workshop, mixing paints. She went on to study in London at the Central School of Art and Design (1957-1959), where she met her future husband, John Burningham.

In her adult life, she embarked on a career in theatre, film and television. She worked as assistant designer at Colchester Repertory Theatre, and for three years as painter and designer for the Habima Theatre in Tel Aviv, Israel. In 1962 she returned to Britain and did some design work for ABC Television and Shepperton Film Studios.

After marrying the children's book author and illustrator John Burningham in 1964, she turned to illustrating children’s books herself. In 1988, she created a series of books about a mischievous young boy called Tom, and his stuffed monkey, Pippo. She commented that Tom was very much like her own son in his younger years. Like Tom, her son would often blame his misdeeds on an accomplice (the family dog). She continues to illustrate books. In 1994, Tom and Pippo was adapted into a French animated series which ran for 104 two-minute episodes. Some of her most recent work includes the illustrations for The Growing Story in the September 2008 edition of Bayard Presse's StoryBox magazine.

== Awards ==
Oxenbury is one of 14 illustrators to win two Kate Greenaway Medals (established 1955); Burningham is another. At the time, the annual award by the British Library Association (now CILIP) recognised the year's best children's book illustration by a British subject; two books were occasionally cited; there was no cash prize. Oxenbury won the Medal in 1969 for The Quangle Wangle's Hat, an edition of Edward Lear's 19th-century poem. From 1989 to 1994 she was the Highly Commended runner up four times and she won again for an edition of Alice in Wonderland (Walker, 1999). CILIP's retrospective citation says: "More abundantly illustrated than previous editions ... Alice herself is a child of today – casually dressed, personable and spirited." Alice was named one of the top ten Greenaway Medal-winning works by a 2007 panel, composing the ballot for a public election of the all-time favourite.

Oxenbury won two "Emils", the Kurt Maschler Award by the Maschler publishers and Booktrust that annually recognised one "work of imagination for children, in which text and illustration are integrated so that each enhances and balances the other." The first was for So Much by Trish Cooke, one of her Greenaway runners up, and the second for Alice.

Oxenbury won three Nestlé Smarties Book Prizes, all in the 0–5 years category. The Smarties Prize winners were elected by children from shortlists composed by a panel. Oxenbury-illustrated picture books were the overall winners for 1989, We're Going on a Bear Hunt retold by Michael Rosen, and for 1991, Farmer Duck by Martin Waddell, another Greenaway runner up. So Much was the 1994 age group winner.

Farmer Duck was also the 1991 Illustrated Children's Book of the Year (British Book Awards). Tickle, Tickle, written and illustrated by Oxenbury, won the 1999 Booktrust Early Years Award. In the United States, Big Momma Makes the World by Phillis Root won the Boston Globe–Horn Book Award, picture books category.

Oxenbury illustrated Michael Rosen's book, Oh Dear, Look What I Got!, which won the Children’s Book of the Year in the non-fiction and illustrated category at the 2026 British Book Awards.

== Selected works ==
These are all children's books.

WorldCat reports that Oxenbury's works most widely held in participating libraries are three of her Greenaway Medal runners up, all written by other authors: We're Going on a Bear Hunt (1989), Three Little Wolves and the Big Bad Pig (1993), and Farmer Duck (1991).

- The Quangle Wangle's Hat (Heinemann, 1969), by Edward Lear (late 19th century)

—joint winner of the Kate Greenaway Medal

- The Dragon of an Ordinary Family (Heinemann, 1969), by Margaret Mahy

—joint winner of the Greenaway Medal

- Letters of Thanks (Collins, 1969), by Manghanita Kempadoo
- Helen Oxenbury's ABC of Things (Heinemann, 1971)
- Pig Tale (1973), written in rhyme and illustrated
- Cakes and Custard (Heinemann, 1975, children's rhymes selected by Brian Alderson (children's book critic)
- I can (1985), a board book for babies
- I hear (1985), a board book for babies
- I see (1985), a board book for babies
- The Helen Oxenbury Nursery Story Book (1985), familiar folk tales
- All Fall Down (1987), written and illustrated
- Clap Hands (1987), written and illustrated
- Say Goodnight (1987), written and illustrated
- We're Going on a Bear Hunt (Walker, 1989), retold by Michael Rosen

—winner of the Nestlé Smarties Book Prize (age 0–5 and overall)
—Greenaway runner up, Highly Commended

- Farmer Duck (Walker), 1991, by Martin Waddell

—winner of the British Illustrated Children's Book of the Year and the Smarties Prize (age 0–5 and overall)
—Greenaway runner up, Highly Commended

- The Three Little Wolves and the Big Bad Pig (1993), illustrated by Helen Oxenbury, written by Eugene Trivizas

—Greenaway runner up, Highly Commended
—Parents' Choice Gold Award

- It's My Birthday (1993), written and illustrated
- So Much (Walker), 1994, by Trish Cooke

—winner of the Kurt Maschler Award and the Smarties Prize (ages 0–5 years)
—Greenaway runner up, Highly Commended

- Tickle, Tickle (1999), written and illustrated

—Booktrust Early Years Award

- Alice's Adventures in Wonderland (Walker Books, 1999), an edition of the 1865 classic by Lewis Carroll

—winner of the Kurt Maschler Award and the Kate Greenaway Medal

- Franny B. Kranny, There's a Bird in Your Hair (2000), by Harriet Goldhor Lerner
- Big Momma Makes the World (2002), by Phyllis Root

—winner of the 2003 Boston Globe–Horn Book Award, Picture Book

- Alice Through the Looking Glass (Walker, 2005), an edition of Through the Looking Glass by Lewis Carroll (1871)
- The Growing Story (2007), by Ruth Krauss (1947)
- Ten Little Fingers and Ten Little Toes (2008), by Mem Fox
- There's Going to Be a Baby (2010), by John Burningham
- The Giant Jumperee (Re-Illustrator in 2017), by Julia Donaldson
- Red Riding Hood (2019), Lost Story by Beatrix Potter
- Welcome to the World (2022), by Julia Donaldson
- Oh Dear, Look What I Got! (2025), by Michael Rosen
