= The Happy Hocky Family! =

Book by Lane Smith

- Author: Lane Smith
- Cover artist: Lane Smith
- Language: English
- Genre: Children's literature
- Publisher: Puffin Books
- Publication date: 1993
- Publication place: United States
- Pages: 64
- ISBN: 0-14-055771-7
- OCLC: 35453853
- Followed by: The Happy Hocky Family Moves to the Country!

The Happy Hocky Family! is a children's book by author and illustrator Lane Smith. Written in a style similar to the Dick and Jane books, it tells a series of short, typically single page, stories about the Hocky family, which includes the two parents, three children, their dog, and occasionally their cousin.

== About the book ==
The book is not a typical picture book in that the humor in it tends to be slightly dark and sarcastic, as in the works of Jon Scieszka.

== Sequel ==
A sequel, The Happy Hocky Family Moves to the Country!, was released in 2002.
