= The Frog Prince, Continued =

1991 children's book

- First edition
- Author: Jon Scieszka
- Illustrator: Steve Johnson
- Cover artist: Johnson
- Language: English
- Subject: Fairy tales
- Genre: Children's picture book
- Publisher: Viking Press
- Publication date: 1991
- Publication place: United States
- Pages: 32
- ISBN: 0-590-98167-6
- OCLC: 52539603

The Frog Prince, Continued is a 1991 book by Jon Scieszka. It is a picture book parody "sequel" to the tale of The Frog Prince, but instead of a princess kissing a frog which then turns into a prince, the princess turns into a frog in an alternative storyline to the usual "happily ever after".

== Plot ==
Instead of living happily ever after, issues ensue on both sides. The princess wants the prince to go do something heroic instead of lying around the castle catching flies all day (he's now human but retains some froggy habits). The prince wishes she wouldn't nag him and thinks he was happier back at his lily pad. Eventually he gets fed up and runs away.

The prince encounters three witches on his wanderings and asks each to turn him back into a frog, so he can live happily ever after. The first witch thinks he is looking for Sleeping Beauty. The second witch offers him a poisoned apple. The third lives in a gingerbread house, appears to know Hansel and Gretel, and invites the prince in for dinner. The prince wisely flees from these witches, but finds himself lost in the forest with night falling.

At last, he happens upon a fairy godmother, who is on her way to see a girl about a ball, but who obligingly turns him into a carriage (her repertoire is limited). As he sits in the forest and realizes just how good he had it with the princess, he thinks he'll never get home again. Fortunately, the fairy godmother's magic wears off at (not surprisingly) midnight, the prince turns back into a prince, and he runs home to his princess. When she tells him how much she loves him and was worried about him, the prince kisses the princess, and their troubles are resolved with a different happy ending: they are both transformed into frogs.
