= Baloney (Henry P.) =

Book by Jon Scieszka

- Author: Jon Scieszka, Lane Smith
- Cover artist: Lane Smith
- Language: English
- Subject: Outer Space
- Genre: children's book
- Publisher: Viking Press
- Publication date: 2001
- Publication place: United States
- Pages: 40
- ISBN: 978-0-14-240430-0
- OCLC: 61661264

Baloney (Henry P.) is a children's picture book written by Jon Scieszka and illustrated by Lane Smith. It was published in 2001 by Viking Press.

== Plot ==
The book tells the story of an alien schoolchild who has an excellent reason for being late for school – he had been blasted off into space.

== About the text ==
The book encourages the reader to work out the meaning of a word from its context. The apparently alien words sprinkled throughout the text are actually from Earth languages.
