= Math Curse =

1995 picture book by Jon Scieszka

- Authors: Jon Scieszka; Lane Smith
- Cover artist: Lane Smith
- Language: English
- Subject: Mathematics
- Genre: Children's books picture books
- Publisher: Viking Press
- Publication date: 1995
- Publication place: United States
- Pages: 32
- ISBN: 978-0-670-86194-1
- OCLC: 32589625
- Dewey Decimal: [E] 20
- LC Class: PZ7.S41267 Mat 1995
- Followed by: Science Verse

Math Curse is a children's picture book written by Jon Scieszka and illustrated by Lane Smith. Published in 1995 through Viking Press, the book tells the story of a student cursed by how mathematics is connected to everyday life. In 2009, Weston Woods Studios, Inc. released a film based on the book.

== Plot summary ==
The nameless student begins with a seemingly innocent statement by her math teacher: "you know, almost everything in life can be considered a math problem." The next morning, the hero finds herself thinking of the time she needs to get up, along the lines of algebra. Next comes the mathematical school of probability, followed by charts and statistics. As the narrator slowly turns into a "math zombie", everything in her life is transformed into a problem. A class treat of cupcakes becomes a study in fractions, while a trip to the store turns into a problem of money. Finally, she is left painstakingly calculating how many minutes of "math madness" will be in her life now that she is a "mathematical lunatic." Her sister asks her what her problem is, and she responds, "365 days x 24 hours x 60 minutes." Finally, she collapses on her bed and dreams of being trapped in a blackboard room covered in math problems. Armed with only a piece of chalk, she must escape, and she manages to do just that by breaking the chalk in half, because "two halves make a whole." She escapes through this "whole" and awakens the next morning with the ability to solve any problem. Her curse is broken until the next day, when her science teacher mentions that everything can be viewed as a science experiment in life.

== Math problems ==
The book contains actual math problems (and some rather unrelated questions, such as "What does this inkblot look like?"). Readers can try to solve the problems and check their answers on the back cover.

== Stage adaptation ==
The book was also adapted for the stage by Heath Corson and Kathleen Collins in 1997. It was first performed at the A Red Orchid Theatre in Chicago, Illinois, in 1997, with subsequent productions at other locations. Its West Coast premiere was in 2003 at the Powerhouse Theatre of Santa Monica, California. Collins directed it, and the cast included Kerry Lacy, Thomas Colby, Will Moran, Andrew David James, and Emily Marver. The play met with warm reviews and succeeded with its audiences and local school children.

== In popular culture ==
The book was featured in the first episode of the seventeenth season of the children's series Reading Rainbow, narrated by Michelle Trachtenberg.

== Awards ==
The book was critically acclaimed, receiving several awards and accolades, including Maine's Student Favorite Book Award, the Texas Bluebonnet Award, and New Hampshire's The Great Stone Face Book Award.
