= Science Verse =

2004 picture book by Jon Scieszka

- Authors: Jon Scieszka; Lane Smith
- Cover artist: Lane Smith
- Language: English
- Subject: Science
- Genre: Children's books picture books
- Publisher: Viking Press
- Publication date: 2004
- Publication place: United States
- Pages: 40
- ISBN: 978-0-670-91057-1
- Preceded by: Math Curse
- Followed by: Seen Art?

Science Verse is a 2004 children's picture book written by Jon Scieszka and illustrated by Lane Smith. It received the Picture Book prize in the 2005 Golden Duck Awards. The book, published by Viking Press, is a follow-up to Math Curse.

== Plot ==
This book tells the story - in verse - of a student who, according to his teacher, hears "the poetry of science in everything". Later, the art teacher says their art should be their life, similar to the last line of the preceding book Math Curse.

== Poems ==
In the story, there are several humorous poems about science. They are poems fitted from famous works such as "The Raven", "Twinkle Twinkle Little Star" and "Stopping by Woods on a Snowy Evening".

== CD ==
A promotional CD (total time 5:12) with Jon Scieszka and Lane Smith reading selections from the book was released by Viking some time shortly before publication of the book on September 27, 2004.
