= Seen Art? =

2005 children's picture book by Jon Scieszka

- Author: Jon Scieszka, Lane Smith
- Cover artist: Lane Smith
- Language: English
- Genre: children's book
- Publisher: Viking Press/Penguin Random House LLC, and the Museum of Modern Art
- Publication date: 2005
- Publication place: United States of America
- Pages: 48
- ISBN: 978-0-670-05986-7
- OCLC: 60348593
- Dewey Decimal: [E] 22
- LC Class: N7477 .S36 2005

Seen Art? is a children's picture book written by Jon Scieszka and illustrated by Lane Smith. It was published in 2005 by Viking Press and Penguin Random House LLC, in cooperation with the Museum of Modern Art. It is aimed at a reading age of 4 to 8.

== Plot ==
It depicts a child's view of the art collection at the Museum of Modern Art in New York City via a storyline that follows a young boy's quest for his friend called Art. Asking people whether they have seen Art, and where Art is, leads him on a journey around the Museum. At the end of the book, he finds his friend waiting for him outside the Museum.

== Translation ==
The book has been published in Spanish translation as En Busca de Arte.
