= We're Going on a Bear Hunt =

1989 children's picture book

- Author: Michael Rosen
- Illustrator: Helen Oxenbury
- Language: English
- Genre: Children's literature
- Publisher: Walker Books (UK)
- Publication date: 25 December 1989
- Publication place: United Kingdom
- Media type: Print (Hardcover)
- ISBN: 0689504764
- OCLC: 18259147

We're Going on a Bear Hunt is a British 1989 children's picture book written by Michael Rosen and illustrated by Helen Oxenbury. It has won numerous awards and was the subject of a Guinness World Record for "Largest Reading Lesson" with a book-reading attended by 1,500 children, and an additional 30,000 listeners online, in 2014.

== Plot and design ==
A family of five children (plus their dog), are going out to hunt a bear. They travel through long wavy grass, a deep cold river, thick oozy mud, a big dark forest and a swirling whirling snowstorm before coming face to face with a bear in a narrow gloomy cave. This meeting causes panic and the children start running back home, across all the obstacles, chased by the bear. Finally, the children return to their home and lock the bear out of their house. The bear retreats, leaving the children safe. The children hide under a duvet and say: "We're not going on a bear hunt again!". At the end of the book, the bear is pictured trudging disconsolately on a beach at night, the same beach that is shown on a sunny day as the frontispiece. Most of the illustrations were painted in watercolour. However, the six pictures of the family facing each new hazard are black and white charcoal drawings.

At each obstacle is an onomatopoeic description. Before each obstacle the children chant the refrain:

We're going on a bear hunt.
We're going to catch a big one.
What a beautiful day!
We're not scared.

followed by (while crossing the obstacles):

We can't go over it.
We can't go under it.
Oh no!
We've got to go through it!

At the end of the bear hunt, they (now safe from the bear at home), conclude with this line:

We're not going on a bear hunt again.

== Characters and locations ==
- The eldest of the children (called Stanley in the television adaptation) is sometimes mistaken by readers as being the father but is in fact the oldest sibling. The children are based on Oxenbury's own children. Likewise, the dog is modelled on an actual family pet.
- In the television adaptation, though not in the book, the mother, father, and grandmother of the family make an appearance. Also, the four older children (unnamed in the book) are identified as Stanley (AKA Stan), Katie, Rosie, and Max. The baby sister (youngest of which) remains nameless. The dog (also anonymous in the book) is called Rufus.
  - Stanley is the eldest child, Katie is the second oldest, Rosie is the middle child, Max is the second youngest and the baby sister (unnamed) is the youngest.
- Each of the obstacles, apart from the river, is based on a real life location in England and Wales that Oxenbury knew.
- Unlike the book, where the bear is ambiguously mean and hostile, in the TV adaptation it is unambiguously friendly and lonely, and merely chases the children only because of Rosie being friendly to it and wanting more attention.

== History ==
The story was adapted from a children's chant; Rosen, who heard the song, incorporated it in his poetry shows and subsequently wrote the book based upon it. Since publication, the book has never been out of print and each year has been in the 5,000 best selling books. The publisher has stated that the book has attained worldwide sales of more than 9 million copies.

== Awards ==
The book won the overall Nestlé Smarties Book Prize in 1989 and also won the 0–5 years category. In 1989 it was an 'Honor Book' in the Boston Globe–Horn Book Awards. The book also won the 'School Library Journal Best Book of the Year' and the 'Mainichi Newspapers Japanese Picture Book Award, Outstanding Picture Book from Abroad' award. It was highly commended for the 1989 Kate Greenaway Medal.

The publisher, Walker Books, celebrated the work's 25th anniversary in 2014 by breaking a Guinness World Record for the "Largest Reading Lesson", with a book-reading by author Rosen that was attended by 1,500 children, with an additional 30,000 online.

== Adaptations ==
=== Theatre adaptation ===
The book has been adapted as a stage play by director Sally Cookson with musical score by Benji Bower and design by Katie Sykes. The play has run in the West End and in provincial theatres. The ending of the performance has been changed so that there is a reconciliation between the family and the bear. Time Out magazine, who awarded four stars out of five, whilst describing the performers as "wonderfully entertaining" also said "those in the later primary years might find it a little boring – not an awful lot happens, after all."

=== Television adaptation ===
In August 2015, Lupus Films and Channel 4 (both of whom previously produced The Snowman and The Snowdog) announced the half-hour animated television film adaptation of the picture book with Walker Books' production arm Walker Productions and American entertainment company Herrick Entertainment co-producing the animated adaptation.

Half a year later in January 2016, Lupus Films teamed up with Walker Books' production arm Walker Productions (who was also co-producing the special with Lupus Films) to form Bear Hunt Films that would serve as a co-producer on the adaptation of the book with Lupus Films appointed Union Media as the worldwide distributor.

The half hour animated television adaptation premiered on Channel 4 on 24 December 2016 at 7:30 pm. It featured the voices of Olivia Colman, Mark Williams, Pam Ferris and Michael Rosen, and added much dialogue and other elements, including a scene of Rosie being friendly with the bear before the others pull her away. The Daily Telegraph, giving the programme three stars out of five, commented that "The whole thing was skilfully made, but ... did it need to take such a carefree story and cast a pall of gloom?". However, The Guardian said that adaptation was "sumptuous", "prestigious" but that "The animation adds a dose of festive sadness." It was released on DVD by Universal Pictures Home Entertainment on 14 June 2017.

=== Mobile app ===
A mobile app, based on the book, was launched in December 2016. It is available on Amazon, Android, and Apple platforms.

=== Cultural impact ===
In 2013, the novelists Josie Lloyd and Emlyn Rees wrote a parody of the book, called We're Going On A Bar Hunt, which was illustrated by Gillian Johnson in the style of the original and was published by Constable books and then republished by Little, Brown & Company.

==== "Bear hunts" ====
During the COVID-19 pandemic, "bear hunts" became popular with houses across the United States, Belgium, Netherlands, New Zealand, and Australia placing stuffed bears in windows, in front yards, or on mailboxes for children to look for and find during walks or drives.
