= The Happy Hocky Family Moves to the Country! =

Book by Lane Smith

The Happy Hocky Family Moves to the Country
- Author: Lane Smith
- Cover artist: Lane Smith
- Language: English
- Genre: Children's literature
- Publisher: Puffin Books
- Publication date: 2003
- Publication place: United States
- Pages: 64
- ISBN: 0-14-240297-4
- OCLC: 61676652
- Preceded by: The Happy Hocky Family!

The Happy Hocky Family Moves to the Country! is a Children's book by Lane Smith. A sequel to his book The Happy Hocky Family!, it tells a number of very short stories about the Hocky family and their new home in the country.

It was released in 2003 by Puffin Books.

== See also ==
The Happy Hocky Family!

Lane Smith (illustrator)
