= Glasses (Who Needs 'Em?) =

1991 children's book

- Author: Lane Smith
- Cover artist: Smith
- Language: English
- Subject: Glasses
- Genre: children's books picture books
- Publisher: Viking Books
- Publication date: 1991
- Publication place: United States
- Media type: Hardcover/Paperback
- Pages: 32
- ISBN: 978-0-14-054484-8
- OCLC: 32436956

Glasses (Who Needs 'Em?) is a children's picture book written and illustrated by Lane Smith. It was originally released in 1991 by Viking Books. The book received favorable reviews.

== Plot ==
A boy is unhappy about having to wear glasses until his doctor provides an imaginative list of well adjusted eyeglass wearers.
