= Grandpa Green =

Children's book by Lane Smith

- Author: Lane Smith
- Illustrator: Lane Smith
- Language: English
- Genre: Children's literature
- Publisher: Roaring Brook Press/Holtzbrinick Publishers
- Publication date: 2011
- Publication place: United States
- Media type: Picture book (hardcover)
- Pages: 32
- ISBN: 978-1-59643-607-7

Grandpa Green is a children's book by author and illustrator Lane Smith. It was published by Roaring Brook Press in 2011 and was selected as a Caldecott Honor Book in 2012.

== Plot ==
Grandpa Green's great-grandson travels through a garden he created. In the garden, he discovers Grandpa Green's lost memories, including living on a farm, having chickenpox, going to war, getting married, and starting a family.

== Awards and honors ==
- A New York Times Best Illustrated Book 2011
- Publishers Weekly Best Children's Picture Books title for 2011
- One of School Library Journal's Best Picture Books of 2011
- Nominated for Caldecott Honor Book in 2012
