= John, Paul, George & Ben =

Book by Lane Smith

- Author: Lane Smith
- Cover artist: Lane Smith
- Language: English
- Subject: The Founding Fathers
- Genre: United States history
- Publisher: Hyperion Books
- Publication date: 2006
- Publication place: United States
- Pages: 40
- ISBN: 978-0-7868-4893-5
- OCLC: 61821924
- Dewey Decimal: [E] 22
- LC Class: PZ7.S6538 Jo 2006

John, Paul, George & Ben is a children's picture book written and illustrated by American illustrator Lane Smith. Released in 2006 through Hyperion Books, it tells the story of five of the Founding Fathers of American independence: John Hancock, Paul Revere, George Washington, Benjamin Franklin and Thomas Jefferson. The book describes each of them to be independent, bold, honest, clever, or noisy. The name of the book is a parody of the names of the members of the British band The Beatles; John, Paul, George and Ringo, with Ben replacing Ringo.

== Reception ==
School Library Journal (SLJ) referred to John, Paul, George & Ben as an "entertaining romp through American history", while Booklist's Carolyn Phelan called it "deftly drawn, witty, and instantly appealing". Elizabeth Bush, writing for The Bulletin of the Center for Children's Books, praised Smith for "out-legend[ing] the legends with his broad parodies of early adulatory histories", and Publishers Weekly (PW) recommended the book "for those constitutionally opposed to history lessons".

According to Biography's Barbara Feinberg, "Smith's witty text and illustrations bring new life". PW specifically pointed out the "True or False section" at the back of the book, which they found to be "as hilarious as it is informative" and "a wonderful complement to this singular blend of parody and historically accurate events". Kirkus Reviews similarly referred to the "True or False section" as "pretty funny" but indicated that Smith's "text lacks his sometime partner Jon Scieszka’s focus". They explained, "While there is a hallowed place for irreverence in children’s literature, one might wish for a work that more evenly balances humor with substance".

Multiple reviewers discussed the book's artwork, with Kirkus Reviews praising the "faux-antiqued illustrations", which they found to "deliver bucket-loads of zany energy". SLJ highlighted how the "gleeful pen-and-ink and collage artwork evokes the era and shows the lads' antics". Similarly, Bush referred to Smith's "visual play on colonial artwork" as "pretty darn clever". According to Bush, most readers should recognize "the little founders' caricatures", which "are unmistakably based on well-known paintings", and "readers in the know will enjoy searching out more subtle references", including "Beatles allusions, like the title," which PW noted "are mercifully few but well-placed".

Phelan critiqued the book, noting that "the title offers a clue that Smith is winking at adults, but as good a joke as it is, most children just won't get it". They further explained, "The artwork and design are excellent and adults will chortle, but this book seems likely to confuse children unfamiliar with the period. Kids will need to know actual, factual American history to appreciate what's going on."

== Awards and honors ==
John, Paul, George & Ben is a Junior Library Guild book. It was named one of the best non-fiction children's books of 2006 by The Horn Book Magazine, The Bulletin of the Center for Children's Books, Chicago Public Library, Child, Miami Herald, Parenting, Publishers Weekly, San Francisco Chronicle, School Library Journal, and St. Louis Post-Dispatch The New York Times also included it on their list of the best illustrated books of the year.

John, Paul, George & Ben was a New York Times and Publishers Weekly bestseller.

Awards for John, Paul, George & Ben
Year	Award	Result	Ref.
	Oppenheim Toy Portfolio Platinum Book Award	Winner	
	Quill Award	Nominee	
	New York Bookbinders Design Merit Award		
2007	Zena Sutherland Award for Best Overall	Winner	
2007	Zena Sutherland Award for Best Text	Winner	

== Adaptations ==
In 2007, Weston Woods Studios adapted the book to an animated film narrated by James Earl Jones.

That year, Booklist included the film on their Booklist Editors' Choice for Media list. The following year, the Association for Library Service to Children included it on their annual list of Notable Children's Videos.
