= The Very Persistent Gappers of Frip =

2000 children's book by George Saunders

- US release cover
- Author: George Saunders
- Illustrator: Lane Smith
- Language: English
- Publisher: Villard Books
- Publication date: August 15, 2000
- Publication place: United States
- Media type: Print (Hardcover)
- Pages: 96
- ISBN: 0-375-50383-8

The Very Persistent Gappers of Frip is a 2000 children's book written by adult novelist George Saunders. It was Saunders' first children's book.

== Plot summary ==
The village of Frip, consisting of three shacks by the sea, relies entirely on the production and sale of goat's milk. The gappers, an unintelligent lifeform shaped like a spiky fish, crawl up from the sea and sit on the backs of the goats. The gappers are so excited about the goats that they cling to them and emit a loud, high-pitched shriek of joy when they are on them. The children of Frip must brush the gappers off of the goats' backs into their gapper sacks and throw them off a cliff back into the sea 8 times a day. When one slightly less stupid gapper realizes that one of the houses is closer to the sea, they overwhelm the goats in that shack, belonging to Capable and her father, leaving the others untouched and their selfish owners rejoice in their no longer having to deal with the problem. When Capable asks them for help, they show their true colors.
