= Eugene Trivizas =

Greek sociologist and children's writer

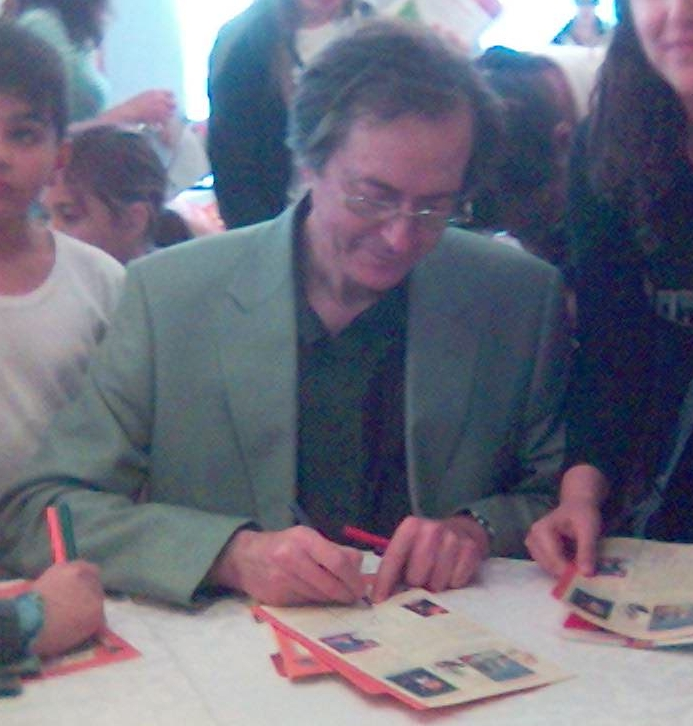
- Trivizas signing autographs
- Born: 1946 (age 78–79) Athens, Greece
- Occupation: Sociologist, author
- Years active: 1969–present

Eugene Trivizas (Greek: Eυγένιος Τριβιζάς, Evgenios Trivizas; born 1946) is a Greek criminologist and writer of children's books. For his lasting contribution as a children's writer, Trivizas was a finalist for the biennial international Hans Christian Andersen Award in 2006.

== Background ==
Born in Athens, he received his LL.B. degree from the University of Athens in 1969. In 1972, he passed the Athens Bar examinations and in the same year he was called as a barrister to the Athens Bar. In 1973, he received a BSc degree in Politics and Economics from the University of Athens and the following year he received an LL.M. degree in Comparative Criminal Law and Procedure from the University of London (University College) and a diploma in Shipping Law from the City of London Polytechnic. In 1977, he was made a Fellow of the Salzburg seminar in American studies and in 1979, he was awarded his PhD degree in Criminology from the University of London (London School of Economics and Political Science, Law Department).

== Teaching ==
Since 1978, Trivizas has been responsible for the teaching of criminology in the Department of Sociology at the University of Reading. He is currently teaching a course on crime and society and he has been awarded the titles of director of criminal justice studies and senior research fellow.

During the past years, Trivizas taught part of the course, 'History of Sociological Theory', at the same university. He also taught criminology on a part-time basis at the Polytechnic of Central London and in the London School of Economics (Law Department 1983-4) Since 1992, he has been a visiting professor at the Panteion University of Social and Political Sciences in Athens.

At the postgraduate level, he taught part of the M.A. course, 'Morals, Law and Elites in Contemporary Society', an option in the University of Reading MA course in Sociology, and the course 'Comparative Criminology' in the Graduate School of European and International Studies and in the MA degree in Criminal Justice. Since 1982, he has been supervising candidates for the degree of PhD and acting as one of the internal examiners for PhD students.

== Research ==
Trivizas was one of the first academics to complete a systematic study of crowd disorders in England and their implications for the British system of criminal justice. He studied (a) the crowd participants and their interaction with the Police and (b) the attitude of the courts to them. This involved studying the problems deriving from football crowds, political demonstrations and pop festivals in the Metropolitan Police Area. In order to undertake the above research, he was attached to the Metropolitan Police Department (New Scotland Yard) for two years and spent a considerable amount of time in the Statistics Branch (Z10) and the Operations Branch (A8) at Scotland Yard in the Police Records Office at Peel House, and in eight London Police stations. In the course of his research, he was given complete access to the records of police and courts.

The Home Office and Scotland Yard gave him permission to participate in various types of police activities. He was able to accompany police officers in their crowd control and observation duties and to attend the briefing of police officers and the interviewing of offenders in the police stations.

He used his findings to make a comparative analysis of political and football crowd disorders in London - the first comparative empirical study in this field. He followed up this study of police and crowd behaviour with a detailed investigation of the ways in which offenders arrested as a result of various forms of crowd disorder were prosecuted and sentenced by the courts. In particular, he was able to demonstrate the high degree of prosecutorial discretion available to the police as a result of the existence of the many overlapping statute and common law offences, and to show how this affects police policy with regard to prosecuting. He was further able to show that similar events occurring in a variety of different types of crowd disorder were regarded very differently by the courts and were the subject of major discrepancies in sentencing.

He has also published extensively on many aspects of criminology, the sociology of deviance, the human rights implications of the electronic monitoring of offenders, and has written about censorship on a comparative basis. His last study, published in the British Journal of Criminology, deals with one of the most controversial issues in modern criminal justice policy, that of general deterrence. The underlying assumption of general deterrence theory and associated policy, is that individuals calculate the risk involved and refrain from criminal activity because of the fear of punishment. Opponents of general deterrence, on the other hand, dispute the thesis that potential criminals calculate risks in a rational manner and that the perception of the danger that they will be apprehended and punished for their misbehaviour, has any significant deterrent effect.

The issue of deterrence is notoriously difficult to research because of the methodological and ethical problems involved. Rarely are researchers presented with the opportunity to find the right circumstances to conduct research on this issue. Trivizas' study takes advantage of such an opportunity: the incidents of terrorist bombs in railway stations and the publicity. His hypothesis was that in periods immediately following publicised terrorist incidents in railway stations, the number of cases of stolen luggage, will be lower compared to the number of cases of stolen luggage in other periods preceding and following such incidents. This hypothesis was based on the assumption that potential thieves will be less likely to commit offences of luggage theft in periods immediately following publicised terrorist incidents, because of their fear that: a) higher police vigilance following such incidents increases the chances of them being apprehended, and b) the luggage may contain explosives and thus endanger their lives, by stealing it. If, therefore, deterrence assumptions are valid, one should expect a reduction of luggage thefts in periods following publicised terrorist incidents.

His research on the theft of luggage covered all three aspects of general deterrence: a) probability of sanctions, i.e. perceived certainty of arrest (due to extra police vigilance) b) celerity of sanctions and c) severity of sanctions (the potentially lethal effects of stealing a piece of luggage containing explosives). The analysis of his data showed that in the periods immediately following a terrorist incident, there was a sharp, if short lived, decline in the number of cases of luggage theft. This indicates that either police vigilance or the fear that the items may contain explosives have had a deterrent effect.

== Literature ==
Trivizas has published many books on literature, and he is one of Greece's leading writers for children. He has produced more than a hundred books, all of them currently in print, and he has received more than twenty national and international literary prizes and awards.

Much of Trivizas' work has been transferred to the stage and serialised for television as well as the radio. He is currently the most frequently performed writer of plays for children in Greece. In 1986, his play The Carecrow was placed on the International Board on Books for Young People's "Honour List", and awarded a Diploma for excellence in writing,

His first book for children to be published in the English language was The Three Little Wolves and the Big Bad Pig, illustrated by Helen Oxenbury and published by Heinemann in 1993. The Economist wrote about this book that "only the most talented of writers can tamper with a classic nursery tale and produce something almost as amusing and thought-provoking as the original." The Three Little Wolves reached second place in the American best seller list for picture books, has won many distinctions (including ALA Notable Book and School Library Journal best book, and the "Parents' Choice Gold Award") and has been translated into fifteen languages.

Two books by Trivizas ("The 33 pink rubies" and "The 88 small stuffed vine leaves") were collectively named "Parapolymythia" and said to be part of a series termed "Multiclone" advertised as "magic books containing 1000 hidden tales" and as "strange books that tell you another story each time you read them". These books are examples of ergodic literature following a format similar to the Choose Your Own Adventure series.

== The Coca-Cola case ==
In 1997, Trivizas won the first stage of a legal battle against The Coca-Cola Company, preventing the multinational company from registering in Greece the title of his TV serial and comic-strip books, Fruitopia, as a trademark for its Fruitopia line of fruit-flavoured beverages. The court decided that Coca-Cola had unlawfully appropriated his intellectual property. Coca-Cola appealed against the decision and in December 1999 the relevant court of appeal ruled once again for Trivizas. He plans to pursue the case beyond Greece.

== Work ==
- The Three Little Wolves and the Big Bad Pig (with Helen Oxenbury)

- original Greek version, translations in Chinese, Dutch, English, Finnish, Japanese, Portuguese, Welsh
