= Hooray for Diffendoofer Day! =

Book by Dr. Seuss

- Author: Dr. Seuss; Jack Prelutsky
- Illustrator: Dr. Seuss; Lane Smith
- Language: English
- Genre: Children's literature
- Publisher: Random House
- Publication date: January 1, 1998
- Publication place: United States
- Media type: Print (hardcover and paperback)
- ISBN: 0-679-89008-4
- OCLC: 37546897
- Dewey Decimal: 811/.54 [E] 21
- LC Class: PZ8.3.G276 Hm 1998
- Preceded by: My Many Colored Days
- Followed by: The Bippolo Seed and Other Lost Stories

Hooray for Diffendoofer Day! is a children's book credited to Dr. Seuss "with some help from Jack Prelutsky and Lane Smith". The book is based on verses and sketches created by Seuss before his death in 1991, and was expanded to book length and completed by poet Prelutsky and illustrator Smith for publication in 1998.

== Plot ==
The story surrounds the Diffendoofer School in the town of Dinkerville, which is well liked by its students, particularly the unnamed narrator, notably because of its many eccentric faculty members, especially Miss Bonkers, the narrator's teacher. However, the students must make a good grade on a standardized test (which turns out in the end to be a revising test on multiple subjects they regularly learn) or Diffendoofer will be demolished and they will be sent to an adjacent school in Flobbertown, a place that requires uniforms to be worn and is incredibly dull.

== Reception ==
Reviews for Hooray for Diffendoofer Day! were mixed, given the book's distinction from those written and illustrated by Dr. Seuss.

According to School Library Journal's Nancy Menaldi-Scanlan, Hooray for Diffendoofer Day! "jumps off the page", and "the original talents of Prelutsky and Smith bring [the] unfinished Dr. Seuss story to life." Similarly, Kirkus Reviews referred to the "marriage of Seuss, Prelutsky, and Lane" as "magic". They called Prelutsky's contributions "delightfully obvious" while highlighting how he "blended whole slices of Seussian verse into his lines". They also praised Smith's "crazy, deliciously colored artwork". Menaldi-Scanlan further described "the bright, exuberant collage and oil illustrations" as "a combination of the familiar Seussian style and Smith's own".

Other reviewers were more critical of the work, especially given its connection to Dr. Seuss. According to Booklist's Michael Cart, Hooray for Diffendoofer Day! includes "a little Seuss and a lot of Smith and Prelutsky." Similarly, Publishers Weekly pointed out how "Dr. Seuss's name towers over the title on the jacket here, setting up readers to measure the book within [...] against the late artist's classic work", which "is almost certain to disappoint". Cart explained, "The completed text, which adds a whimsical story that celebrates individuality, is more faithful to the Seussian spirit (and latter-day didacticism) than the collage pictures, which owe as much to The Cabinet of Dr. Caligari as they do to The Cat in the Hat." Cart also indicated that the "singsong text" included "often uninspired rhymes."
