= The Three Little Wolves and the Big Bad Pig =

Inverted version of Three Little Pigs published by Heinemann

- Author: Eugenios Trivizas
- Illustrator: Helen Oxenbury
- Cover artist: Oxenbury
- Language: English
- Genre: Children's picture book, parody, folklore
- Publisher: Heinemann Young Books
- Publication date: 1993
- Publication place: United Kingdom
- Media type: Print (hardcover)
- ISBN: 978-0-434-96050-7
- OCLC: 60102782
- Dewey Decimal: 398.24/52
- LC Class: LCC PZ8.1.T7384

The Three Little Wolves and the Big Bad Pig is a children's picture book written by Eugene Trivizas (Evgenios Trivizas), illustrated by Helen Oxenbury, and first published by Heinemann in 1993. The story is a comically inverted version of the classic Three Little Pigs, a traditional fable published in the 19th century.

Oxenbury was highly commended runner-up for the annual Kate Greenaway Medal from the Library Association, recognising the year's best children's book illustration by a British subject. The "Highly Commended" distinction was used 31 times in 29 years to 2002, including Oxenbury alone for 1993.

In the U.S., where it was also published in 1993, The Three Little Wolves reached number two on the New York Times Best Seller list for picture books. It was named an "ALA Notable Book" and a "School Library Journal Best Book", and it won the "Parents' Choice Gold Award".

WorldCat participating libraries report holding editions in 15 languages of translation.

Publishers Weekly concluded its review: "Trivizas laces the text with funny, clever touches, from an ensemble of animals who obligingly donate whatever building materials the wolves require, to the wolves' penultimate, armor-plated residence replete with a "video entrance phone" over which the pig can relay his formulaic threats. Oxenbury's watercolors capture the story's broad humor and add a wealth of supplementary details, with exquisite renderings of the wolves' comic temerity and the pig's bellicose stances. Among the wittiest fractured fairytales around".

== Plot ==
The story features three anthropomorphic wolves who build four houses using different types of materials: bricks, concrete, steel, and flowers. A big bad pig tries to destroy the houses made of bricks, concrete, and steel by huffing and puffing, but fails, so he finds a way to destroy those houses by using a sledgehammer for the bricks, a pneumatic drill for the concrete, and dynamite for the steel. However, just as the pig is about to blow down the flower house, he smells the fragrant flowers, and has a change of heart. The pig then becomes a good pig, and he and the wolves live happily ever after as friends.

== Publication history ==
- ISBN (hardcover, publ. Heinemann Young Books)
- ISBN 0-689-50569-8 (hardcover, publ. Margaret K. McElderry, first U.S. edition, 1993)
- ISBN 0-590-48622-5 (softcover, publ. Scholastic, reprint 1994)
- ISBN 0-689-81528-X (softcover, publ. Aladdin Books, reprint 1997)

== See also ==
- The True Story of the 3 Little Pigs! by Jon Scieszka and Lane Smith, another inverted version of the story
