= The True Story of the 3 Little Pigs! =

1989 children's book by Jon Scieszka and Lane Smith

- Author: Jon Scieszka
- Cover artist: Lane Smith
- Language: English
- Genre: Children's book
- Publisher: Viking Children's Books
- Publication date: 1989
- Publication place: United States
- Pages: 32
- ISBN: 0-14-054056-3
- OCLC: 43158890

The True Story of the 3 Little Pigs! is a children's book by Jon Scieszka and Lane Smith. It was the first published book written by Scieszka. Released in a number of editions since its first release by Viking Kestrel, an imprint of Viking Penguin in 1989, it is a parody of The Three Little Pigs as told by the Big Bad Wolf, known in the book as "A. Wolf", short for "Alexander T. Wolf". The book was honored by the American Library Association as an ALA Notable Book.

== Plot ==
The story is a retelling of The Three Little Pigs from the perspective of the wolf, named Alexander. Alexander attempts to request sugar from each of his neighbors, the three pigs, for baking a cake for his grandmother. Alexander accidentally kills the first and second pigs after his sneezes destroy their straw and stick houses. The third pig in the brick house refuses to give any sugar and insults Alexander's grandmother. Enraged, Alexander attempts to break down the front door. He is swiftly arrested by the pig police and sent prison for the first two pigs' deaths. Alexander states that the news coverage of the events was highly exaggerated, leading to his reputation as the Big Bad Wolf.

== Critical reception ==
Based on a 2007 online poll, the National Education Association listed the book as one of its "Teachers' Top 100 Books for Children". It was one of the "Top 100 Picture Books" of all time in a 2012 poll by School Library Journal.

== Adaptation ==
This book was later adapted into a Weston Woods Studios animated short in 2008 with the voice of Paul Giamatti as the wolf. There is also an audio book of Giamatti's performance.

== See also ==
- The Three Little Wolves and the Big Bad Pig, another inverted version of the story
