= Lane Smith (illustrator) =

American illustrator and writer (born 1959)

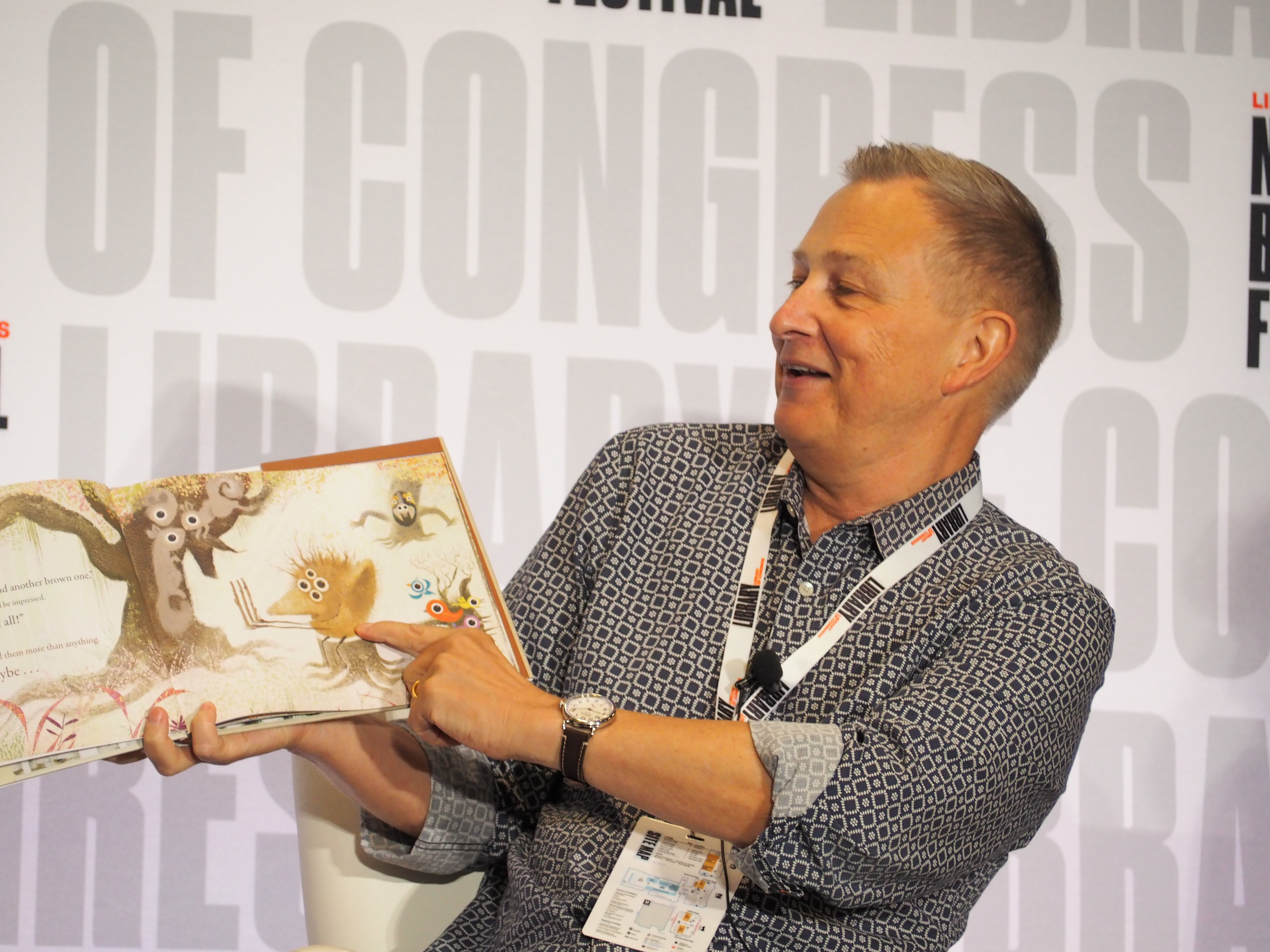
Lane Smith

Lane Smith (born August 25, 1959) is an American illustrator and writer of children's books. He is the Kate Greenaway medalist (2017) known for his eclectic visuals and subject matter, both humorous and earnest, such as the contemplative Grandpa Green, which received a Caldecott Honor in 2012, and the outlandish Stinky Cheese Man, which received a Caldecott Honor in 1992.

== Biography ==
Smith was born in Tulsa, Oklahoma on August 25, 1959. At a young age he moved to Corona, California, and returned to Tulsa during the summers on Route 66, where he later drew aesthetic inspiration for his work, which combines highbrow and lowbrow elements. Smith was artistic from an early age and stated that he "can never remember a time when I didn’t draw". At age seven, his uncle Orlin encouraged his artistic talents, praising Smith's doodles to his parents. At the encouragement of his high school art teacher, Dan Baughman, Smith studied at Art Center College of Design in Pasadena, California.

To help pay tuition, Smith worked as a janitor at Disneyland. In addition, Smith's illustrations appeared in alternative newspapers including L.A. Weekly, L.A. Reader and for the punk magazine No Mag while he was a student. In 1983, Smith illustrated album covers for the band Oingo Boingo (Good For Your Soul) and The Dickies (Stukas Over Disneyland). In 1983, he graduated from Art Center with a Bachelor of Fine Arts in illustration.

After graduation, Smith moved to New York City, where he freelance illustrated for various publications, including TIME, Mother Jones, Ms., Sports Illustrated, The New York Times, Newsweek, Rolling Stone, The Progressive, The Atlantic, The Boston Globe, Sesame Street Magazine and others.

== Children's books ==
Smith is most noted for his work on bestselling and award-winning children's books. He collaborated with writer Jon Scieszka on award-winning and bestselling picture books between 1989 and 2007. Their two most popular books, The True Story of the 3 Little Pigs! (1989) and The Stinky Cheese Man (1992), have been ranked among the 100 best picture books of all time by TIME magazine and School Library Journal. Smith also illustrated nine of Scieszka's The Time Warp Trio novels. He and Scieszka were introduced by their wives, Molly Leach and Jeri Hansen, in the late 1980s.

Smith has also illustrated works by Florence Parry Heide, Judith Viorst, Bob Shea, Dr. Seuss, Jack Prelutsky, Eve Merriam, Roald Dahl, George Saunders, Jory John, Chris Harris and Julie Fogliano.

As an author–illustrator, he has published books including It's a Book (2010), a New York Times bestseller for six months that has been translated into more than 28 languages. Others include The Happy Hocky Family (1996), The Happy Hocky Family Moves to the Country! (2002), Madam President (2008), John, Paul, George & Ben (2006), and A Perfect Day (2017).

On May 5, 2015, Roaring Brook Press published Smith's first middle-grade novel, Return to Augie Hobble, which received starred reviews from Publishers Weekly, Kirkus Reviews and Booklist and was named a "best book of the year" by the Washington Post.

=== Art style ===
Smith illustrations are known for their experimental and textual nature, and are created with a variety of media, including oil paint, pen and ink, pencil, watercolor, collage and digital tools. A 2017 exhibit at the Eric Carle Museum of Picture Book Art featured a statement from Smith that praised the art of Alice and Martin Provensen for being unconventional and inconsistent:

Some picture book artists are very consistent with their style, which is probably a good thing for business and career. My favorite artists are the ones who try a different look with every book. That's why I like the Provensens. Everything they did had a lot of experimentation going on. Like children who haven't yet been told not to splatter ink onto their drawings, or not to mix oil paints with watercolors, or that the sky is blue, not green … [In my own paintings] from The Stinky Cheese Man I made the textures by combining oil paint with water-based varnishes. You're not supposed to do that. It makes the paint bubble up like little pebbles.

=== Film and television ===
He illustrated an edition of Roald Dahl's James and the Giant Peach, and was a conceptual designer for the 1996 Disney movie adaptation. He contributed conceptual designs for Disney and Pixar's Monsters, Inc. and the film adaptation of How the Grinch Stole Christmas!. Smith wrote and directed the 35 mm short Water Ride (1994), which starred Bill Irwin. It aired on PBS and the Bravo channel, and was screened at the Hamptons International Film Festival, among others.

== Personal life ==
Smith is married to the graphic designer Molly Leach, who has designed many award-winning books, including nearly all books Smith has published. They lived in New York City for 30 years, before moving to rural Connecticut around the early 2020s. Smith is happiest when he is working on a book ("everything is rosy, the future is all promise") and struggles with sadness after publication.

"I do not believe in an afterlife. What I do believe in is the art we all create. It will live after we are gone. Even if all of my books are out of print there will be at least one copy in a dusty box somewhere..."
– Lane Smith, 2023

Smith has described himself as "very optimistic about pretty much everything", a quality he described as "annoying". In one instance, he repeatedly praised the weather during a walk with his 90-year-old mother-in-law, who responded, 'If you say that one more time I am going to hit you with this cane.'"

== Books ==
Some listings may not be first editions.

=== As writer and illustrator ===
- Flying Jake (Viking Children's Books, 1988)
- Glasses (Who Needs 'Em?) (Viking, 1991)
- The Big Pets (Viking, 1991)
- The Happy Hocky Family! (Viking, 1993)
- Pinocchio: The Boy (Viking, 2002)
- The Happy Hocky Family Moves to the Country! (Viking, 2003)
- John, Paul, George & Ben (Hyperion Press, 2006)
- Madam President (Viking, 2008)
- The Big Elephant In The Room (Hyperion, 2009)
- It's a Book (Roaring Brook Press, 2010)
- It's a Little Book (Roaring Brook, 2011)
- Grandpa Green (Roaring Brook, 2011) – Caldecott Honor Book
- Abe Lincoln's Dream (Roaring Brook, 2012)
- Return to Augie Hobble (Roaring Brook, 2015)
- There Is a Tribe of Kids (Roaring Brook, 2016)
- A Perfect Day (Roaring Brook, 2017)
- A Gift For Nana (Random House Kids, 2022)
- Stickler Loves the World (Random House Kids, 2023)

=== As illustrator ===
Written by Jon Scieszka

- The True Story of the 3 Little Pigs! (Viking, 1989)
- The Stinky Cheese Man and Other Fairly Stupid Tales (Viking, 1992) – Caldecott Honor Book
- Math Curse (Viking, 1995)
- Squids Will Be Squids (Viking, 1998)
- Baloney (Henry P.) (Viking, 2001)
- Science Verse (Viking, 2004)
- Seen Art? (Viking, 2005)
- Cowboy and Octopus (Viking, 2007)

Smith has also illustrated some installments of Scieszka's The Time Warp Trio series of novels.

By other writers

- Halloween ABC, Eve Merriam (Simon & Schuster), 1987
- James and the Giant Peach, Roald Dahl (Random House, 1996 edition)
  - The illustrations also appear in the 1997 hardcover book The Roald Dahl Treasury.
- Hooray for Diffendoofer Day!, Dr. Seuss and Jack Prelutsky (Random House, 1998)
- The Very Persistent Gappers of Frip, George Saunders (McSweeney's, 2000)
- Big Plans, Bob Shea (Hyperion, 2008)
- Princess Hyacinth, Florence Parry Heide (Schwartz & Wade, 2009)
- Lulu and the Brontosaurus, Judith Viorst (Atheneum Books, 2010)
- Lulu Walks the Dogs, Judith Viorst (Atheneum Books, 2012)
- Kid Sheriff and the Terrible Toads, Bob Shea (Roaring Brook, 2014)
- Penguin Problems, Jory John (Random House, 2016)
- I'm Just No Good at Rhyming and Other Nonsense for Mischievous Kids and Immature Grown-Ups, Chris Harris (Little, Brown, 2017)
- A House That Once Was, Julie Fogliano (Roaring Brook, 2018)
- Giraffe Problems, Jory John (Random House, 2018)

== Awards and honors ==
- 1987: New York Times A Best Illustrated Book of the Year, Halloween ABC
- 1987: School Library Journal, A Best Book of the Year, Halloween ABC
- 1987: Horn Book Honor List, Halloween ABC
- 1987: Booklist Editor's Choice, Halloween ABC
- 1987: Ohio Silver Buckeye Award, Halloween ABC
- 1989: Silver Medal, Society of Illustrators, The True Story of the Three Little Pigs!
- 1989: New York Times A Best Books of the Year, The True Story of the Three Little Pigs!
- 1989: Maryland Black-eyed Susan Picture-Book Award, The True Story of the Three Little Pigs!
- 1991: Golden Apple Award, Bratislava International Biennial of Illustrations, The Big Pets
- 1991: Society of Illustrators Silver Medal, The Big Pets
- 1991: First-place award, New York Book Show, The Big Pets
- 1991: Parent's Choice Award for Illustration, Glasses—Who Needs 'Em?
- 1991: New York Times Best Books of the Year citation, Glasses—Who Needs 'Em?
- 1991: ALA Notable Children's Book citation, Glasses—Who Needs 'Em?
- 1992: Library of Congress Books for Children, Glasses—Who Needs 'Em?
- 1992: A Publishers Weekly #1 bestseller, The Stinky Cheese Man, and Other Fairly Stupid Tales
- 1992: Caldecott Honor, The Stinky Cheese Man, and Other Fairly Stupid Tales
- 1992: New York Times A Best Illustrated Book of the Year, The Stinky Cheese Man, and Other Fairly Stupid Tales
- 1992: New York Times Notable Children's Book, The Stinky Cheese Man, and Other Fairly Stupid Tales
- 1992: School Library Journal, A Best Book of the Year, The Stinky Cheese Man, and Other Fairly Stupid Tales
- 1993: Publishers Weekly, A Best Book of the Year, The Happy Hocky Family
- 1995: Booklist Editors' Choice citation - Math Curse
- 1996: Publishers Weekly, A Best Children's Book - Math Curse
- 1996: ALA Best Book for Young Adults citation - Math Curse
- 1996: No. 1 Publishers Weekly bestseller, James and the Giant Peach
- 1998: No. 1 Publishers Weekly bestseller, Dr. Seuss' Hooray for Diffendoofer Day!
- 2006: New York Times Best Illustrated Book of the Year, John, Paul, George, and Ben
- 2006: New York Times Notable Book, John, Paul, George, and Ben
- 2006: Child magazine Best Book of the Year, John, Paul, George, and Ben
- 2006: National Parenting Publication Gold Award, John, Paul, George, and Ben
- 2006: School Library Journal Best Book of the Year, John, Paul, George, and Ben
- 2006: Horn Book Fanfare, John, Paul, George, and Ben
- 2006: Publishers Weekly Best Book of the Year, John, Paul, George, and Ben
- 2006: Parenting Best Book of the Year, John, Paul, George, and Ben
- 2006: Child magazine Best Book of the Year, John, Paul, George, and Ben
- 2007: Zena Sutherland Award, John, Paul, George, and Ben
- 2008: Read Boston's Best Read Aloud Book, Madam President
- 2010: Winner, Ladybug Picture Book Award, Princess Hyacinth
- 2010: A Publishers Weekly Best Children's Book, It's a Book
- 2010: Goodreads Choice Awards Winner, Favorite Picture Book, It's a Book
- 2010: A New York Times Notable Book, It's a Book
- 2010: Boston Globe, Ten Best Books of 2010, It's a Book
- 2011: Caldecott Honor, Grandpa Green
- 2011: A New York Times Best Illustrated Book, Grandpa Green
- 2011: Publishers Weekly Best Children's Book, Grandpa Green
- 2011: Silver medal Society of Illustrators, Grandpa Green
- 2011: School Library Journal Best Book, Grandpa Green
- 2015: A Washington Post Best Book of the Year, Return to Augie Hobble
- 2015: L.A. Times Summer Recommended Reading List, Return to Augie Hobble
- 2015: Amazon Editors' Picks for Summer Reading: Ages 9–12, Return to Augie Hobble
- 2015: Publishers Weekly Best Summer Books, Return to Augie Hobble
- 2016: Irish Times, A Best Book of the Year, Penguin Problems
- 2016: Bank Street, A Best Children's Book of the Year, Penguin Problems
- 2017: NEIBA finalist, A Perfect Day
- 2017: An NPR Best Book of the Year, A Perfect Day
- 2017: Kate Greenaway Medal, There Is a Tribe of Kids
- 2018: An ALSC Notable Children's Book, A Perfect Day
- 2018: A New York Times Best Illustrated Book, A House That Once Was
