= The Stinky Cheese Man and Other Fairly Stupid Tales =

Children's book by Jon Scieszka

- Author: Jon Scieszka
- Cover artist: Lane Smith
- Language: English
- Genre: children's books picture books
- Publisher: Viking Press
- Publication date: 1992
- Publication place: United States
- Pages: 56
- ISBN: 978-0-670-84487-6
- OCLC: 25248190
- Dewey Decimal: [E] 20
- LC Class: PZ8.S3134 St 1992

The Stinky Cheese Man and Other Fairly Stupid Tales is a postmodern children's book written by Jon Scieszka and illustrated by Lane Smith. Published in 1992 by Viking, it is a collection of twisted, humorous parodies of famous children's stories and fairy tales, such as "Little Red Riding Hood", "The Ugly Duckling" and "The Gingerbread Man". The book won The New York Times Best Illustrated Book award, was a Caldecott Honor book in 1993, and has won numerous other awards in various countries.

The book has proved to be popular with children and adults and is considered an American classic, as its lighthearted approach creates interest while educating young readers about some of the features of books (such as title and contents) by poking fun at those conventions.

The book was re-released in a 10th-anniversary edition in 2002 and included a new story, a parody of "The Boy Who Cried Wolf" on the dust jacket.

== Plot ==
The book is narrated by the character of Jack from Jack and the Beanstalk, who tells the stories and deals with the rest of the cast. There is a very loud and annoying Little Red Hen that comes in to complain about no one helping her make her bread (or do anything). Chicken Licken believes that the sky is falling and demands that someone call the President until the table of contents crushes her and the others. Jack introduces Little Red Running Shorts, a counterpart of Little Red Riding Hood, by blurting out the entire story — including the ending — so she and the wolf refuse to be in it. The Stinky Cheese Man, a counterpart of The Gingerbread Man, is afraid to be near anyone because he thinks that they will eat him, but is avoided for his bad smell.

Also in the book are "The Princess and the Bowling Ball", "The Other Frog Prince", "The Really Ugly Duckling", "Cinderumplestiltskin" and "The Tortoise and the Hair". In the first, a retelling of "The Princess and the Pea", the Prince finally finds a girl he really loves. Sick of his parents rejecting potential wives when they do not feel a pea under 100 mattresses, he slips his bowling ball under her mattresses when his parents have her over. In "The Other Frog Prince", the frog tells the princess that he will turn into a prince if she kisses him and so she does; he then says "I was just kidding" and hops back into the lake. "The Really Ugly Duckling" (a parody of Hans Christian Andersen's "The Ugly Duckling"), grows up to be a Really Ugly Duck rather than a swan. "Cinderumplestiltskin" combines "Cinderella" and "Rumplestiltskin". In "The Tortoise and the Hair", a re-telling of "The Tortoise and the Hare", a Rabbit says he can grow his hair (one on the top of his head) faster than the Tortoise can run; this story has no ending, the last words of it being "not the end."

The foreword includes a parody of "Goldilocks and the Three Bears" as an example of a "Fairly Stupid Tale". Also, the table of contents includes the title, "The Boy Who Cried Cow Patty", a story found nowhere in the book. The latter story was printed on the back of the dust jacket for the book's 10th anniversary edition (whereas the original edition had the Little Red Hen complaining about buying this book, while asking who "this ISBN guy" is and complaining that she is only in three of the pages as a book gag).

In "Goldilocks and the Three Elephants", Goldilocks enters the house of the elephants, but she cannot climb up on any of the three chairs and eat "peanut porridge", so she goes home.

In the special 10th anniversary edition, "The Boy Who Cried Cow Patty" is about a boy who cried "Cow Patty" every time someone did something. One day, he took a shortcut behind Mr. Smith's barn and he jumped over the fence without looking. Not knowing Mr. Smith just shoveled out the cow barn, he lands in a fresh pile of cow patty and cries "Fire!". The firemen came and asked where the fire was, but the boy said that, if he cried "Cow Patty", no one would get him.

== See also ==
- Revolting Rhymes
