= Jon Scieszka =

American children's writer and reading advocate (born 1954)

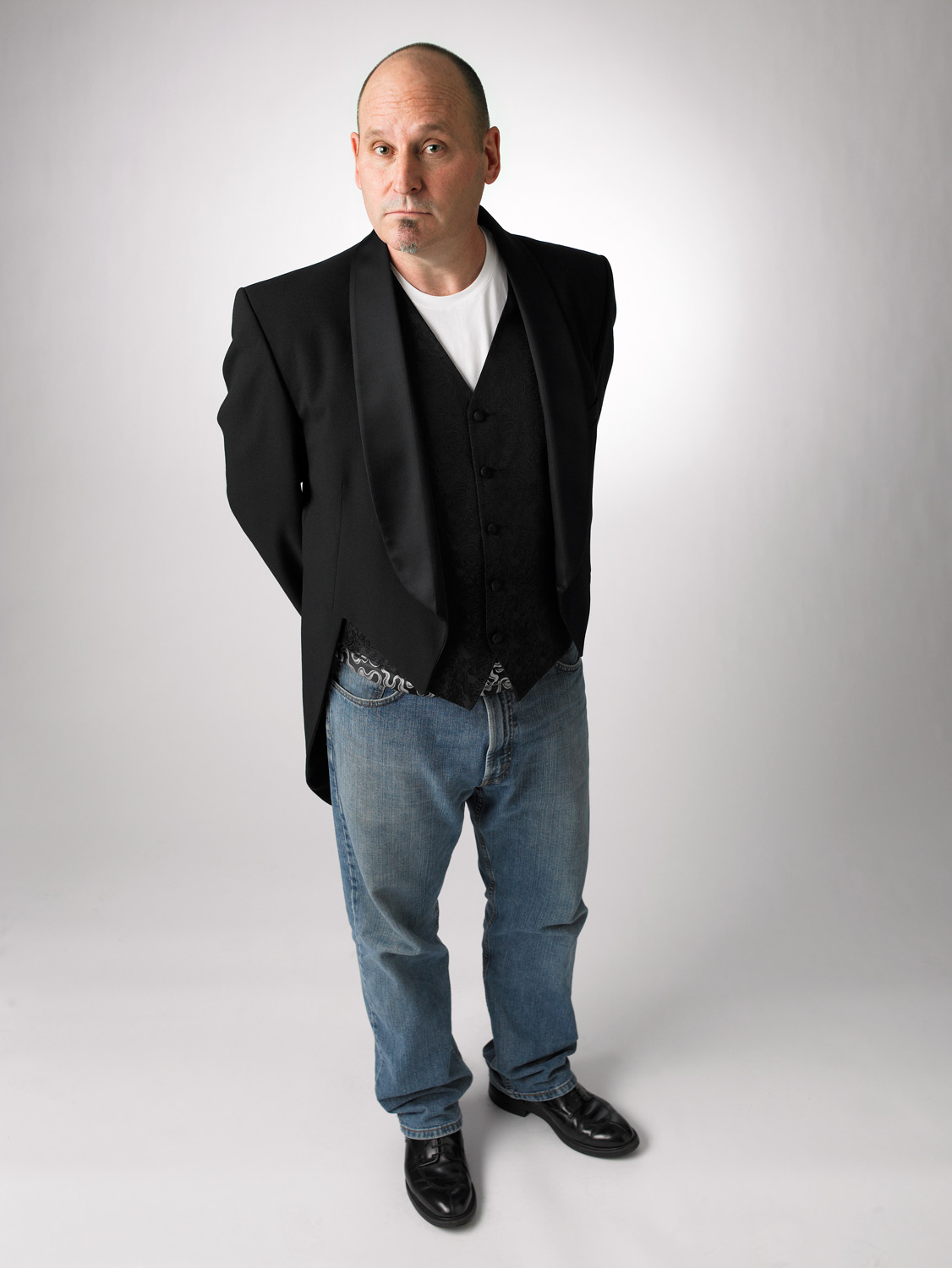
- Scieszka in 2008
- Born: September 8, 1954 (age 72); Flint, Michigan, U.S.
- Education: Albion College; Columbia University
- Occupation: Writer
- Writing career
- Genre: Children's books
- Notable awards: National Ambassador for Young People's Literature; 2008–2009
- Website: jonscieszka.com

Signature
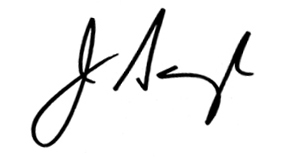

Jon Scieszka (/ˈʃɛʃkə/ SHESH-kə: born September 8, 1954) is an American author known for picture books including The True Story of the 3 Little Pigs! and Math Curse, often illustrated by Lane Smith. Scieszka wrote Time Warp Trio, a series of youth novels to teach history. He founded Guys Read, a web-based reading advocacy program to encourage boys to become readers."

Scieszka was the first U.S. National Ambassador for Young People's Literature in 2008 and 2009, appointed by the Librarian of Congress.

== Early life and education ==
Scieszka was born in Flint, Michigan on September 8, 1954. He was the second oldest of six sons born to Shirley Scieszka, a registered nurse, and Louis Scieszka, a former elementary school principal.

Scieszka attended Culver Military Academy in Indiana for high school. In 1979, he graduated with a B.A. from Albion College in Michigan, where he studied English and medical science. He then earned a Master of Fine Arts in fiction writing at Columbia University in 1980. While attending Columbia, he painted apartments as a job.

== Career ==
After graduation, Scieszka taught at Trevor Day School in New York City for ten years, where he worked with students between 1st and 8th grades but mostly focused on second graders. He then began writing and touring full-time.

I remember telling my second-graders the basic "Metamorphosis" story, saying, like, what about - what if a guy woke up one morning and he was a bug? Wouldn't that be weird? And they loved that. And I think that was the trigger that made me think, like, oh man, here's my audience. They're just a lot shorter than I ever thought they might be. — Jon Scieszka on NPR, November 29, 2008

Scieszka said he writes books because he "loves to make kids laugh." He has collaborated with the illustrator Lane Smith on many of his best-known works, including The True Story of the 3 Little Pigs! (1989), The Stinky Cheese Man and Other Fairly Stupid Tales (1992), and Math Curse. Smith illustrated 9 of the 16 novels in Scieszka's The Time Warp Trio series, which went on to be adapted into the Time Warp Trio television show in 2005 and 2006. Smith's wife, the graphic designer Molly Leach, contributed cover and layout design for many books by Scieszka and Smith. Some of these books, notably Stinky Cheese Man, have been noted for their zany and unconventional graphics and have influenced picture book artists.

Scieszka is also the founder of Guys Read, a web-based literacy program for boys whose mission is "to help boys become self-motivated, lifelong readers." He founded the nonprofit in response to his experiences as an elementary school teacher and the United States National Assessment of Educational Progress statistics showing boys consistently scoring worse than girls on federal reading tests every year, at every grade level.

In 2008 Scieszka was named the nation's first National Ambassador for Young People's Literature by the Librarian of Congress. During his two years as Ambassador, it was his job to raise "national awareness of the importance of young people’s literature as it relates to lifelong literacy, education and the development and betterment of the lives of young people." For Scieszka, this meant traveling to schools, libraries, and book-related conferences to speak about engaging kids in reading through choice, an expanded definition of reading, positive role models, and embracing new technologies. He has joked that being an ambassador gets him out of parking tickets.

== Personal life ==
Scieszka lives in Park Slope, Brooklyn with his wife and children.

== Books ==
Scieszka has written and edited many books for various publishers.

=== Picture books ===
- The True Story of the 3 Little Pigs!, illustrated by Lane Smith - Harper & Row - 1989 ISBN 9780140544510
- The Frog Prince, Continued, illustrated by Steven Johnson - Viking Press - 1991
- The Stinky Cheese Man and Other Fairly Stupid Tales, illustrated by Lane Smith - Viking Press - 1992 ISBN 9780670844876
- The Book That Jack Wrote, illustrated by Dan Adel - Viking Press - 1994 (out of print)
- Math Curse, illustrated by Lane Smith - Viking Press - 1995 ISBN 9780670861941
- Squids Will Be Squids, illustrated by Lane Smith - Viking Press - 1998
- Baloney, (Henry P.), illustrated by Lane Smith - Viking Press - 2001
- Science Verse, illustrated by Lane Smith - Viking Press - 2004
- Seen Art?, illustrated by Lane Smith - Viking Press- 2005
- Cowboy and Octopus, illustrated by Lane Smith - Viking Press - 2007
- Walt Disney’s Alice In Wonderland, illustrated by Mary Blair - Disney Press - 2008
- Robot Zot, illustrated by David Shannon - Simon & Schuster - 2009

=== Series ===
==== The Time Warp Trio ====
Also see The Time Warp Trio

The Time Warp Trio books are illustrated middle grade novels about three boys, Sam, Joe, and Fred, who travel through time and space with a magical book. The early books were illustrated by Lane Smith, and later ones by Adam McCauley. They are published by Viking Press.

- Knights of the Kitchen Table, illustrated by Lane Smith - 1991
- The Not-So-Jolly Roger, illustrated by Lane Smith - 1991
- The Good, the Bad, and the Goofy, illustrated by Lane Smith - 1992
- Your Mother Was a Neanderthal, illustrated by Lane Smith - 1993
- 2095, illustrated by Lane Smith - 1995
- Tut, Tut, illustrated by Lane Smith - 1996
- Summer Reading Is Killing Me!, illustrated by Lane Smith - 1998
- It's All Greek to Me, illustrated by Lane Smith - 1999
- See You Later, Gladiator, illustrated by Adam McCauley - 2000
- Sam Samurai, illustrated by Adam McCauley - 2001
- Hey Kid, Want to Buy a Bridge?, illustrated by Adam McCauley - 2002
- Viking It and Liking It, illustrated by Adam McCauley - 2002
- Me Oh Maya!, illustrated by Adam McCauley - 2003
- Da Wild, Da Crazy, Da Vinci, illustrated by Adam McCauley - 2004
- Oh Say, I Can't See, illustrated by Adam McCauley - 2005
- Marco? Polo!, illustrated by Adam McCauley - 2006

Jon Scieszka - Time Warp Trio Lyrics

==== Trucktown ====
Scieszka was inspired to create the Trucktown series because he "really wanted to write something for all of those crazy little guys who didn’t think there was something out there for them to read."

The Trucktown characters and backgrounds were created by the team of David Shannon, Loren Long, and David Gordon. The over fifty-book Trucktown program includes picture books, "Ready-to-Roll" early reader books, board books, and a variety of activity books. They are published by Simon & Schuster Children's Publishing.

A TV series with the same name was produced by Nelvana and it premiered on Treehouse TV in Canada on September 6, 2014, it was also available to stream as part of Nickelodeon's NOGGIN streaming service.

Picture Books:

- Smash! Crash! - 2008
- Melvin Might? - 2008
- Truckery Rhymes - 2009

Ready-to-Roll:

- Snow Trucking! - 2008
- Pete's Party - 2008
- Uh-Oh Max - 2008
- Zoom! Boom! Bully - 2009
- Melvin's Valentine - 2009
- The Spooky Tire - 2009
- Kat's Mystery Gift - 2009
- Trucksgiving - 2010
- Dizzy Izzy - 2010
- Trucks Line Up - 2011

==== Spaceheadz ====
Spaceheadz is a multi-platform story, told through four books, multiple websites, integrated blogs, social media sites, videos, ads, and user-created content. The story reveals how three aliens from the planet Spaceheadz disguise themselves as 5th graders in Brooklyn in order to sign up 3.14 million and 1 Earthlings to be Spaceheadz and save Earth. The extensive online storytelling is managed by Casey Scieszka and Steven Weinberg. The books are illustrated by DreamWorks animator Shane Prigmore, and published by Simon & Schuster Children's Publishing.

- Spaceheadz Book #1!, illustrated by Shane Prigamore with Francesco Sedita - 2010
- Spaceheadz Book #2!, illustrated by Shane Prigamore with Casey Scieszka and Steven Weinberg - 2010
- Spaceheadz Book #3!, illustrated by Shane Prigamore with Casey Scieszka and Steven Weinberg - 2011
- Spaceheadz Book #4!, illustrated by Shane Prigamore with Casey Scieszka and Steven Weinberg - 2013

==== Frank Einstein ====
The Frank Einstein books are illustrated middle grade (3-7) novels about a kid-genius scientist and inventor named Frank Einstein.

- Frank Einstein and the Antimatter Motor, illustrated by Brian Biggs - Abrams/Amulet, 2014
- Frank Einstein and the Electro-Finger, illustrated by Brian Biggs - Abrams, 2015
- Frank Einstein and the BrainTurbo, illustrated by Brian Biggs - Abrams, 2015
- Frank Einstein and the EvoBlaster Belt, illustrated by Brian Biggs - Abrams, (forthcoming September 2016)
- Frank Einstein and the Bio-Action Gizmo, illustrated by Brian Biggs - Abrams, 2017
- Frank Einstein and the Space-Time Zipper, illustrated by Brian Biggs - Abrams, 2018

=== Memoir/novel ===
- Knucklehead: Tall Tales and Mostly True Stories of Growing Up, Scieszka - Viking Press - 2008

=== Contributor ===
- Guys Write for Guys Read, "Brothers" - Viking - 2005
- Puffin Classics edition of Swiss Family Robinson, "Introduction" - Puffin Classics - 2009
- Half-Minute Horrors, "Whispers" - HarperCollins - 2009
- Guys Read: Funny Business, "Your Question for Author Here," with Kate DiCamillo - Walden Pond Press - 2010
- The Chronicles of Harris Burdick: Fourteen Amazing Authors Tell the Tales, "Under The Rug," illustrated by Chris Van Allsburg - Houghton Mifflin - 2011

=== Editor ===
- Guys Write for Guys Read - Viking Press - 2005
- Guys Read: Funny Business, contributors: Mac Barnett, Patrick Carman, Christopher Paul Curtis, Kate DiCamillo, Paul Feig, Jack Gantos, Jeff Kinney, David Lubar, Adam Rex - Walden Pond Press - 2010
- Guys Read: Thriller, contributors: M.T. Anderson, Gennifer Choldenko, Matt de la Peña, Margaret Peterson Haddix, Bruce Hale, Jarrett J. Krosoczka, Anthony Horowitz, Walter Dean Myers - Walden Pond Press - 2011
- Guys Read: Sports Pages, contributors: Dustin Brown, James Brown, Joseph Bruchac, Chris Crutcher, Tim Green, Dan Gutman, Gordon Korman, Chris Rylander, Anne Ursu, Jacqueline Woodson, with illustrations by Dan Santat - Walden Pond Press - 2012
- Guys Read: Other Worlds, contributors: Rick Riordan, Tom Angleberger, D. J. MacHale, Rebecca Stead, Ray Bradbury, Shaun Tan, Neal Shusterman, Shannon Hale, Kenneth Oppel, Eric S. Nylund, with illustrated by Greg Ruth - 2013
- Guys Read: True Stories, contributors: Jim Murphy, Elizabeth Partridge, Nathan Hale, James Sturm, Candace Fleming, Douglas Florian, Sy Montgomery, Steve Sheinkin, T. Edward Nickens, Thanhha Lai - 2014
- Guys Read: Terrifying Tales, contributors: Adam Gidwitz, R.L. Stine, Dav Pilkey, Michael Buckley, Claire Legrand, Nikki Loftin, Adele Griffin, Kelly Barnhill, Lisa Brown, Daniel José Older, Rita Williams-Garcia, with illustrations by Gris Grimly - 2015
- Guys Read: Heroes & Villains, contributors: Christopher Healy, Sharon Creech, Cathy Camper, Laurie Halse Anderson, Ingrid Law, Deborah Hopkinson, Pam Muñoz Ryan, Eugene Yelchin, Jack Gantos, Lemony Snicket - 2017

== Awards and recognition ==
Scieszka was named the first U.S. National Ambassador for Young People's Literature by the Library of Congress for 2008–2009. He received the annual University of Southern Mississippi Medallion for lifetime contribution to children's literature in 2013.

Two children's books written by Scieszka and illustrated by Lane Smith were ranked among the 100 best all-time picture books in a 2012 survey published by School Library Journal: The True Story of the Three Little Pigs, number 35, and The Stinky Cheese Man, 91.

Scieszka's books have received many awards and other recognitions, including:

- 1989: The New York Times Book Review, Best Books of the Year citation, The True Story of the 3 Little Pigs!
- 1989: American Library Association, Notable Children's Book citation, The True Story of the 3 Little Pigs!
- 1989: Maryland Black-eyed Susan Picture Book Award, The True Story of the 3 Little Pigs!
- 1989: Parenting Reading Magic Award, The True Story of the 3 Little Pigs!
- 1992: The New York Times Book Review, Best Illustrated Books of the Year citation, The Stinky Cheese Man and Other Fairly Stupid Tales
- 1992: School Library Journal Best Books of the Year citation, The Stinky Cheese Man and Other Fairly Stupid Tales
- 1992: Booklist, Children's Editors' Top-of-the-List citation, The Stinky Cheese Man and Other Fairly Stupid Tales
- 1992: American Library Association, Notable Children's Book citation, The Stinky Cheese Man and Other Fairly Stupid Tales
- 1994: Rhode Island Children's Book Award, The Stinky Cheese Man and Other Fairly Stupid Tales
- 1995: Best Children's Book citation, Math Curse
- 1995: Bulletin of the Center for Children's Books, Blue Ribbon citation, Math Curse
- 1995: Booklist, Top-of-the-List and Editors' Choice citations, Math Curse
- 1995: Publishers Weekly, Best Children's Book, Math Curse
- 1996: American Library Association, Best Books for Young Adults citation, Math Curse
- 1997: Golden Archer Award, The Stinky Cheese Man and Other Fairly Stupid Tales
- 1997: Maine's Student Book Award, Math Curse
- 1997: Texas Bluebonnet Award, Math Curse
- 1997: New Hampshire The Great Stone Face Book Award, Math Curse
- 1999: National Education Association, Kids' Top 100 Books, The True Story of the 3 Little Pigs!
- 2001: Los Angeles Times Book Review, Best Books of the Year citation, Baloney, (Henry P.)
- 2001: Reading Magic Award, Parenting magazine, Baloney, (Henry P.)
- 2001: The New York Times Book Review, Notable Books, Baloney, (Henry P.)
- 2001: Reading Magic Awards, Parenting magazine Baloney, (Henry P.)
- 2002: Notable Children's Books in the Language Arts, Baloney, (Henry P.)
- 2002: Golden Duck Awards for Excellence in Children's Science Fiction Literature, Baloney, (Henry P.)
- 2004: Parent's Choice Award, Gold, Non-Fiction, Science Verse
- 2005: American Library Association, Notable Children's Book Award, Science Verse
- 2005: Golden Duck Awards for Excellence in Children's Science Fiction Literature, Science Verse
- 2009: Bank Street Best Books of the Year, Robot Zot
- 2009: Irma S. Black Award, Honor Book, Robot Zot
- 2009: The New York Times Book Review, Bestseller, Robot Zot

=== On writing ===
In his autobiography, Knucklehead: Tall Tales and Almost True Stories of Growing Up Scieszka, he writes that his inspiration for much of his work comes from the "strange things" that happened to him while growing up with his brothers.

Scieszka creates outlines for the books of his Time Warp Trio series for structural reasons. When writing other books, however, he says, "Anything goes. Middle first, sometimes end, sometimes title, sometimes punchline."
