= Viking Press =

American publishing company

- Parent company: Penguin Random House
- Status: Active
- Founded: 1925; 101 years ago
- Founders: Harold K. Guinzburg; George Oppenheimer
- Country of origin: United States
- Headquarters location: New York City
- Key people: Brian Tart (president); Kenneth Wright (Children's publisher)
- Imprints: Viking Kestrel; Viking Adult; Viking Children's Books; Viking Portable Library
- Official website: penguin.com/vikingbooks

Viking Press (formally Viking Penguin, also listed as Viking Books) is an American publishing company owned by Penguin Random House. It was founded in New York City on March 1, 1925, by Harold K. Guinzburg and George S. Oppenheimer and then acquired by the Penguin Group in 1975.

The publisher's name and logo, a Viking ship drawn by Rockwell Kent, were chosen as symbols of enterprise, adventure, and exploration in publishing.

Viking Press was sold to Penguin Books in 1975 for $12 million due to the publishing house's monetary difficulties. These were speculated to have been caused by the shrinkage in the juvenile market and Viking Press' lack of a textbook division.

== Imprints ==
- Viking Kestrel
- Viking Adult
- Viking Children's Books
- Viking Portable Library
- Pamela Dorman Books

=== Viking Children's ===
In 1933, Viking Press founded a department called Junior Books to publish children's books. The first book published was The Story About Ping in 1933 under editor May Massee. Junior Books was later renamed Viking Children's Books. Viking Kestrel was one of its imprints.

Its books have won the Newbery and Caldecott Medals, and include such books as The Twenty-One Balloons, written and illustrated by William Pene du Bois (1947, Newbery medal winner for 1948), Corduroy, Make Way for Ducklings, The Stinky Cheese Man by Jon Scieszka and Lane Smith (1993), The Outsiders, Pippi Longstocking, and The Story of Ferdinand. Its paperbacks are now published by Puffin Books, which includes the Speak and Firebird imprints. In 2023, Tamar Brazis was named v-p and publisher of Viking Children's Books.

=== Viking Critical Library ===
The Viking Critical Library offers academic editions of literary texts. Like W. W. Norton's Norton Critical Editions, all titles print the text alongside a selection of critical essays and contextual documents (including relevant extracts from the author's oeuvre). The series, which only saw sporadic publications in the late 1970s and late 1990s, has been dormant since 1998, with no new titles released since then. However, a number of existing titles remain in print.

Titles

Author	Title	Editor	Year published	Notes
Don DeLillo	White Noise	Mark Osteen	1998	.
Graham Greene	The Quiet American	John Clark Pratt	1996	
James Joyce	Dubliners	Robert Scholes	1996	
James Joyce	Portrait of the Artist as a Young Man	Chester G. Anderson	1977	The only title known to include explanatory end notes.
Ken Kesey	One Flew Over the Cuckoo's Nest	John Clark Pratt	1977	Out of print.
Jack Kerouac	On the Road	Scott Donaldson	1979	Out of print.
Arthur Miller	The Crucible	Gerald Weales	1996	
Arthur Miller	Death of a Salesman	Gerald Weales	1996	
John Steinbeck	The Grapes of Wrath	Kevin Hearle	1997	

== Notable authors ==
- Abdullah II, King of Jordan
- Kingsley Amis
- Sherwood Anderson
- Hannah Arendt
- Peter S. Beagle
- Antony Beevor
- Saul Bellow
- Ludwig Bemelmans
- Dan Blum
- T. C. Boyle
- Geraldine Brooks
- Daniel James Brown
- William S. Burroughs
- Lan Cao
- Rosanne Cash
- Ferreira de Castro
- J. M. Coetzee
- Leonard Cohen
- Roald Dahl
- Theodore Draper
- Lawrence Durrell
- Kim Edwards
- Daniel Ellsberg
- Helen Fielding
- Frederick Forsyth
- Don Freeman
- Tana French
- Elizabeth George
- Elizabeth Gilbert
- Rumer Godden
- Will Gompertz
- Graham Greene
- R. K. Narayan
- Robert Greene
- Martha Grimes
- S. E. Hinton
- David Irving
- Kristopher Jansma
- James Weldon Johnson
- James Joyce
- Jan Karon
- Ezra Jack Keats
- Garrison Keillor
- William Kennedy
- Jack Kerouac
- Ken Kesey
- Sue Monk Kidd
- Stephen King
- Jamil Jan Kochai
- D. H. Lawrence
- Tobsha Learner
- Rebecca Makkai
- Hilary Mantel
- Peter Matthiessen
- Robert McCloskey
- Terry McMillan
- Arthur Miller
- Jojo Moyes
- John Julius Norwich
- Barack Obama
- Michelle Obama
- Richard Osman
- Octavio Paz
- Steven Pinker
- Thomas Pynchon
- Ruth Sawyer
- Jon Scieszka
- Kate Seredy
- Katherine Binney Shippen
- Upton Sinclair
- Wallace Stegner
- John Steinbeck
- Rex Stout
- August Strindberg
- Simms Taback
- Whitney Terrell
- Barbara Tuchman
- Carl Van Doren
- William T. Vollmann
- David Foster Wallace
- Rosemary Wells
- Rebecca West
- Patrick White
- Vikram Sampath

== Notable editors ==
- Jacqueline Kennedy Onassis, consulting editor
- Wendy Wolf, vice president and associate editor, as of 1994

== Awards ==
- 10 Newbery Medals
- 10 Caldecott Medals
- 27 Newbery Honors
- 33 Caldecott Honors
- 1 American Book Award
- 2 Coretta Scott King Awards
- 3 Batcheldor Honors
- 5 Christopher Medals
- 2 Margaret A. Edwards Awards for authors S. E. Hinton and Richard Peck
