= Bibliography of Halloween =

This is a bibliography of works about Halloween or in which Halloween is a prominent theme.

== Novels ==
- John Bellairs, The House with a Clock in Its Walls
- Jim Butcher, Dead Beat
- Ray Bradbury, Something Wicked This Way Comes (1962)
- Ray Bradbury, The Halloween Tree (1972)
- Agatha Christie, Hallowe'en Party
- Franklin W. Dixon, Dead of Night, #80 in The Hardy Boys' Casefiles
- Franklin W. Dixon, Trick-or-Trouble, #175 in The Hardy Boys Mystery Stories
- Daniel Handler, The Basic Eight
- Ed McBain, Tricks, a novel in 87th Precinct series
- Norman Partridge, Dark Harvest
- Margaret Sutton, The Haunted Attic, #2 in the Judy Bolton Mystery series
- James Tipper, Gods of The Nowhere: A Novel of Halloween
- Halloween by Curtis Richards (a pseudonym of author Dennis Etchison), a novelization of the 1978 film. This novel has been out of print since the 1980s.
- Halloween II by Jack Martin (a pseudonym of author Dennis Etchison), a novelization of the 1981 film.
- Halloween III: Season of the Witch by Jack Martin (a pseudonym of author Dennis Etchison), a novelization of the 1982 film.
- Halloween IV by Nicholas Grabowsky, a novelization of the film Halloween 4: The Return of Michael Myers.
- Five Black Cats by Pat Hegarty
- All Hallows by Christopher Golden

== Short stories ==
- Philarète Chasles, "The Eye with No Lid"

== Anthologies ==
- Isaac Asimov (editor), Thirteen Horrors of Halloween
- Lesley Pratt Bannatyne (editor), A Halloween Reader: Poems, Stories, and Plays from Halloween Past
- Ray Bradbury (author), The October Country
- Ray Bradbury (author), From Dust Returned
- Richard Chizmar (editor), Trick or Treat: A Collection of Halloween Novellas
- Richard Chizmar and Robert Morrish (editors), October Dreams: A Celebration of Halloween
- Paula Guran (editor), Halloween
- Paula Guran (editor), Halloween: Magic, Mystery, and the Macabre
- Marvin Kaye (editor), The Ultimate Halloween
- Ronald Kelly (author), The Halloween Store and Other Tales of All Hallows' Eve
- Ronald Kelly (author), Mister Glow-Bones and Other Halloween Tales
- Lisa Morton (editor), A Hallowe'en Anthology: Literary and Historical Writers over the Centuries
- Norman Partridge (author), Halloween: Tales of the Dark Season
- Alan Ryan (editor), Halloween Horrors
- Al Sarrantonio (author), Halloween and Other Seasons
- J. Tonzelli (author), The End of Summer: Thirteen Tales of Halloween

== Poetry ==
- H. P. Lovecraft, "Hallowe'en In A Suburb" (March 1926)

== Children's books ==
- Adrienne Adams, A Halloween Happening
- Adrienne Adams, A Woggle of Witches
- Frank Asch, Popcorn
- Lesley Bannatyne, Witches' Night Before Halloween
- Harry Behn, Halloween
- Norman Bridwell, Clifford's Halloween
- Robert Bright, Georgie's Halloween
- Eve Bunting, In the Haunted House
- Eve Bunting, Scary, Scary Halloween
- Nancy L. Carson, Harriet's Halloween Candy
- Patricia Coombs, Dorrie and the Halloween Plot
- Paulette Cooper, Let's Find Out About Halloween
- Margery Cuyler, The Bumpy Little Pumpkin
- Gail Gibbons, Halloween Is...
- Rumer Godden, Mr. McFadden's Hallowe'en
- James Howe, Scared Silly: A Halloween Treat
- Will Hubbell, Pumpkin Jack
- Ulrich Karger, The Scary Sleepover
- Carolyn Keene, Nancy Drew and the Clue Crew: The Halloween Hoax
- Kazuno Kohara, Ghosts in the House!
- Robert Kraus, How Spider Saved Halloween
- Elizabeth Levy, Something Queer at the Haunted School
- Eve Merriam, Halloween ABC
- Herman Parish, Happy Haunting, Amelia Bedelia
- Gary Paulsen, Dunc's Halloween
- Robert Newton Peck, Higbee's Halloween
- Jack Prelutsky, It's Halloween
- Jack Prelutsky, Nightmares: Poems to Trouble Your Sleep
- Jack Prelutsky, The Headless Horseman Rides Tonight: More Poems to Trouble Your Sleep
- Alvin Schwartz, Scary Stories to Tell in the Dark
- J. Otto Seibold, Vunce Upon a Time
- Jerry Seinfeld, Halloween
- Erica Silverman, Big Pumpkin
- Erica Silverman, The Halloween House
- Fran Cannon Slayton, When the Whistle Blows
- Louis Slobodkin, Trick or Treat
- Jerry Smath, I Like Pumpkins
- James Stevenson, That Terrible Halloween Night
- Geronimo Stilton, It's Halloween, You 'Fraidy Mouse!
- R. L. Stine, Goosebumps: The Haunted Mask
- R. L. Stine, Goosebumps: Attack of the Jack O'Lanterns
- R. L. Stine, Goosebumps HorrorLand: The Scream of the Haunted Mask
- R. L. Stine, Goosebumps Horrorland: Weirdo Halloween
- R. L. Stine, Fear Street: Halloween Party
- Jill Thompson, Scary Godmother
- Tasha Tudor, Pumpkin Moonshine
- Nora S. Unwin, Proud Pumpkin
- Nora S. Unwin, Two Too Many
- Dan Yaccarino, Five Little Pumpkins
- John D. Dries, Rumbles the Cloud and the Ghost Left Behind, Blueberry Illustrations ISBN 978-0615624808

== Non-fiction ==
- Diane C. Arkins, Halloween: Romantic Art and Customs of Yesteryear. Gretna, LA: Pelican Publishing Company (2000). 96 pages. ISBN 1-56554-712-8
- Diane C. Arkins, Halloween Merrymaking: An Illustrated Celebration of Fun, Food, and Frolics from Halloweens Past. Gretna, LA: Pelican Publishing Company (2004). 112 pages. ISBN 1-58980-113-X
- Lesley Bannatyne, Halloween: An American Holiday, An American History. New York: Facts on File (1990). 176 pages. ISBN 0-81601-846-4; Halloween Nation. Behind the Scenes of America's Fright Night. Gretna, LA: Pelican Publishing Company (2011). 248 pages. ISBN 9781589806801
- Edna Barth, Witches, Pumpkins, and Grinning Ghosts: The Story of the Halloween Symbols. New York: Seabury Press (1972). 95 pages. ISBN 0-81643-087-X
- Phyllis Galembo, Dressed for Thrills: 100 Years of Halloween Costumes and Masquerade. New York: Harry N. Abrams, Inc. (2002). 128 pages. ISBN 0-8109-3291-1
- Lint Hatcher, The Magic Eightball Test: A Christian Defense of Halloween and All Things Spooky. Lulu.com (2006). ISBN 978-1-84728-756-4
- Ronald Hutton, The Stations of the Sun: A History of the Ritual Year in Britain. Oxford Paperbacks (2001). 560 pages. ISBN 0-19285-448-8
- Ruth Edna Kelley, The Book of Hallowe'en. BiblioLife (2009, reprint ed., orig. 1919). 140 pages. ISBN 0-55910-509-6
- Jean Markale, The Pagan Mysteries of Halloween: Celebrating the Dark Half of the Year (translation of Halloween, histoire et traditions). Rochester, VT: Inner Traditions (2001). 160 pages. ISBN 0-89281-900-6
- Lisa Morton, The Halloween Encyclopedia. Jefferson, NC: McFarland & Company (2003). 240 pages. ISBN 0-78641-524-X
- Lisa Morton, Trick or Treat: A History of Halloween. London: Reaktion Books (2012). 229 pages. ISBN 1-78023-047-8
- Mark Oxbrow, Halloween: Pagan Festival to Trick or Treat. London: Strega Press (2001). 267 pages. ISBN 978-1903254127
- Nicholas Rogers, Halloween: From Pagan Ritual to Party Night. New York: Oxford University Press (2002). 198 pages. ISBN 0-19514-691-3
- Jack Santino (ed.), Halloween and Other Festivals of Death and Life. Knoxville, TN: University of Tennessee Press (1994). 280 pages. ISBN 0-87049-813-4;
- The Hallowed Eve: Dimensions of Culture in a Calendar Festival in Northern Ireland. Lexington, KY: University of Kentucky (2009). 180 pages. ISBN 9780813120812
- David J. Skal, Death Makes a Holiday: A Cultural History of Halloween. New York: Bloomsbury USA (2003). 224 pages. ISBN 1-58234-305-5
- Ben Truwe, The Halloween Catalog Collection. Portland, OR: Talky Tina Press (2003). ISBN 0-97034-485-6

== See also ==
- List of films set around Halloween
- List of Halloween television specials
