= Kohara (name) =

Kohara (written: 小原) is a Japanese surname. Notable people with the surname include:

- Haruka Kohara (小原 春香, born 1988), Japanese idol and singer
- Kazuno Kohara, Japanese author and illustrator
- Konomi Kohara (小原 好美, born 1992), Japanese voice actress
- Riko Kohara (小原 莉子, born 1990), Japanese voice actress and guitarist
- Yuki Kohara (小原 裕貴, born 1980), Japanese singer and actor
