= Weihnachten =

Christmas Eve in German-speaking countries

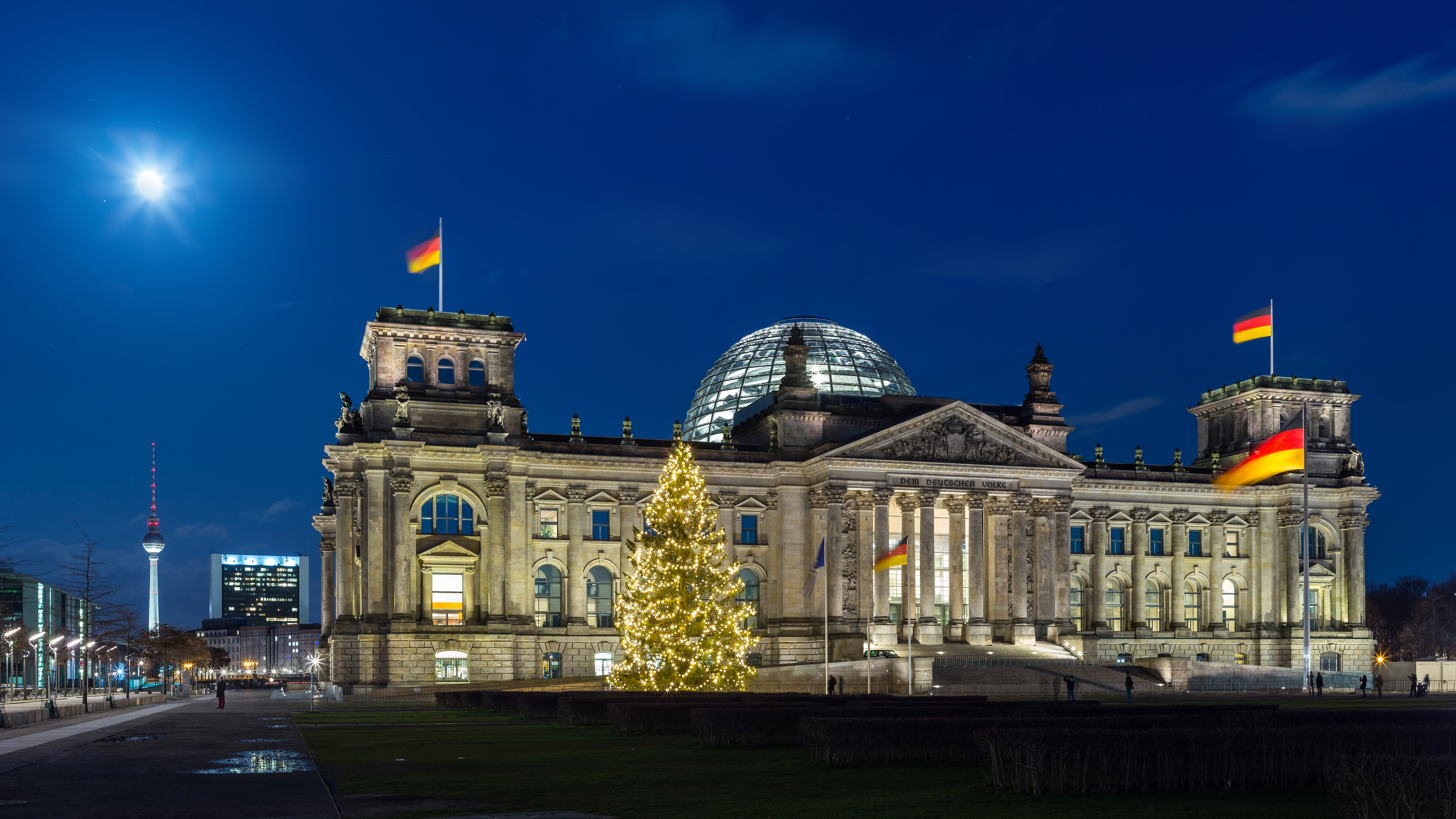
- The Reichstagsgebäude decorated for Christmas
- Observed by: Germany; Austria; Switzerland; Liechtenstein; Partly: Luxembourg; Belgium
- Type: Christian
- Significance: Commemoration of the birth of Jesus
- Celebrations: Gift-giving, family and other social gatherings, symbolic decoration, feasting
- Date: 24 December – 26 December
- Related to: Christmas, New Year's, Nikolaustag

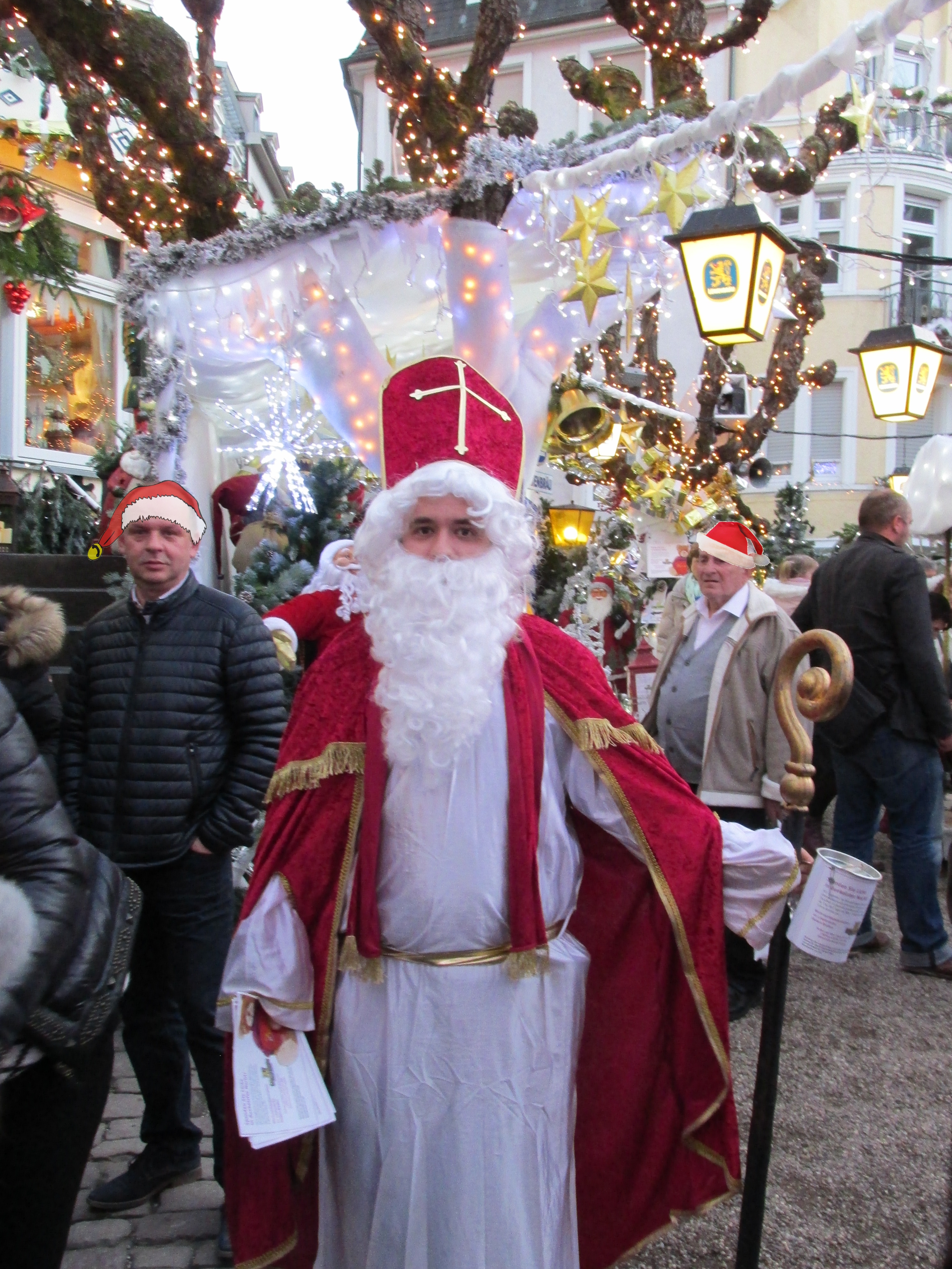
A man dressed as Nikolaus for Weihnachten in Baden-Baden

Weihnachten (German: [ˈvaɪnaxtn̩]) is the observance of what is commonly known in English as Christmas in the German-speaking countries such as Germany, Austria and Switzerland. It is also widespread in countries with a German-speaking minority, such as Transylvania in Romania, South Tyrol in Italy, Eupen in Belgium, and various diasporas such as the German Brazilian and German American communities. Traditions of Weihnachten influenced Advent and Christmastide culture throughout the world.

== Preparations ==
In preparation for Weihnachten, many families celebrate Advent. This is a time of religious preparation for the arrival of the Christkind (the Christ Child). Traditional advent activities include the Adventskranz (Advent wreath), which is set up on the fourth Sunday before Christmas Day, the beginning of the Advent season. Four candles adorn the wreath, and a new one is lit each Sunday. Families often sing Christmas carols as they gather around the wreath to celebrate the preparation and Christmas season.

Children also enjoy the advent calendar, which contains 24 doors, one for each day of December leading up to Christmas. Children open one door each day, and find a chocolate treat awaiting them. Many calendars also include pictures inside the doors, often Christmas-related.

A significant part of the Christmas build-up occurs on 6 December, when it is Nikolaustag, the day commemorating St. Nikolaus (Saint Nicholas). On the evening of 5 December, children in Germany place a Nikolausstiefel (a boot or a shoe) in front of the street door. Overnight, the Nikolaus, a figure similar in appearance to Santa Claus or Father Christmas, visits the house and fills the boots with sweets and sometimes even smaller presents if the children were good; otherwise they are left with only a rute (a cane composed of birch twigs).

In Switzerland, on the evening of 6 December an empty small bag is placed in front of the door and some minutes or hours later, the Samichlaus (Swiss German for Nikolaus) with his companion Schmutzli fills the bag and enters the house.

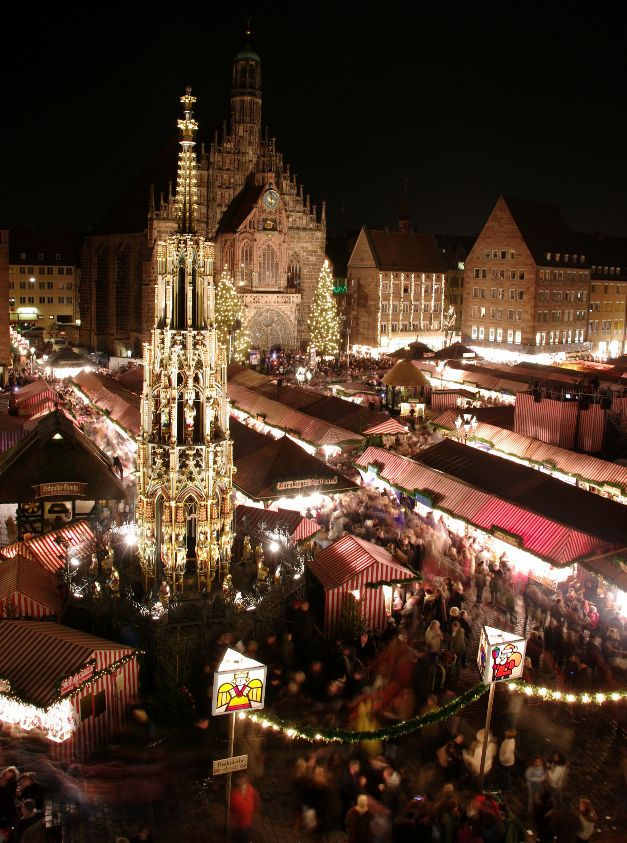
The Christkindlesmarkt in Nuremberg

During the Christmas period, the Christkindlesmarkt (Christmas market, also known as Weihnachtsmarkt) becomes a feature of almost every city, town, or village in the German-speaking countries, where visitors enjoy stalls, entertainment, and savour food and Glühwein (mulled wine). Traditional Christmastime treats include Lebkuchen (gingerbread), Stollen (fruit cake), Spekulatius and Marzipan (almond confectionery often made into sweets). Perhaps the most famed of these markets is the one held in Nuremberg, which attracts millions of visitors every year.

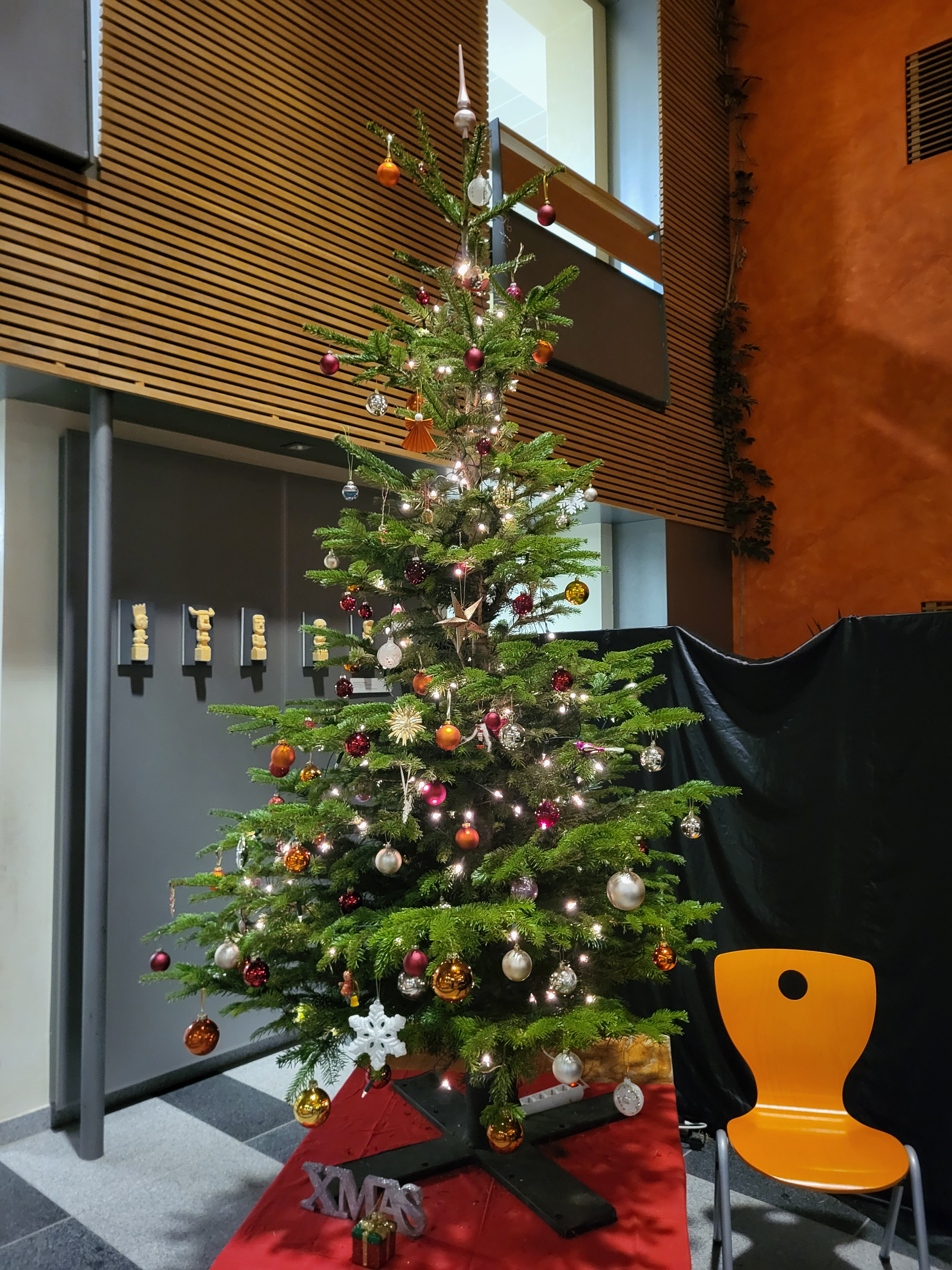
A German christmas tree

The Weihnachtsbaum (Christmas Tree) is usually put up in the afternoon of 24 December. The trees can be bought at special traders' sites, but some families may still go into the forest and cut one themselves.

Traditionally, on Heiligabend (Christmas Eve) in Germany, a simple meal will be prepared and served before or after the Bescherung ("time for exchanging gifts"), in contrast to the big meal on Christmas Day. Various polls repeatedly declare (Eintopf) or sausages (Würstchen) with potato salad to be Germany's favourite meal on Heiligabend. Further typical meals may include carp, fondue or raclette. On Christmas Day, the most common dishes are roast goose or duck.

== Order of events ==
Many families begin the celebration on Heiligabend (literally, Holy Evening, or Christmas Eve) in the afternoon or evening. Although there are two legal holidays in Germany, Austria, most cantons of Switzerland and Liechtenstein for Christmas, Christmas Eve is not one of them, and in Switzerland, many companies and stores are open for a half-day in the morning until 4 p.m, after which celebrations begin.

Many go to church before the celebration begins. Christmas masses/services often last around one hour. Families with children go to a children's mass which is usually shorter and dramatised with a Krippenspiel (nativity play).

The customs held upon returning from church leading to the gift-giving vary across the German-speaking countries. Commonly, the returning children wait to enter into their locked living room until a little bell rings. This bell marks the departure of the one who is delivering gifts. In the more Catholic regions—primarily South Germany, Austria and Switzerland—the gift bearer role belongs to the Christkind, while those in North Germany commonly consider it to be the Weihnachtsmann (Santa Claus) who is exiting.

The children then enter to see the decorated Weihnachtsbaum (Christmas tree), with all the presents beneath wrapped in colourful paper that has been prepared by an adult while they were away at church. Adults may also share gifts while the children are opening theirs. For the Bescherung in Germany, the only light comes from the Christmas tree lights (traditionally real candles, though today generally replaced by electric lights). In Switzerland, this is done after the big meal in the evening.

An alternative tradition in many homes does not include a ringing bell or presents already lying beneath the tree when children return from church. Instead (although not in the southern region) the Weihnachtsmann, usually played by a relative, appears in person, knocking at the door while the family sits together. Once he is let in, he puts his sack and rute (shepherd's crook) aside and greets the family. He then asks the child or children to perform by singing a Christmas song or reciting a poem and then asks them if they were naughty or nice. Most children admit that they have not always been nice, so the Weihnachtsmann wants the promise that they do better next year before giving all their presents. He then retreats and the family spends the rest of the evening together, enjoying their gifts and company.

== After Heiligabend ==
On the first or second Day of Christmas (25th and 26th), many of the typical Christmas meals will be served. The most common include goose, duck, fondue (with many types of meat), raclette and game dishes. In Switzerland often small meals are offered.

The Christmas tree is disposed after the second week of January, with (genuine) trees being left outside for collection by refuse collectors. Some households, however, opt to use artificial trees instead that may be simply packed away until next year's Weihnachten.

== See also ==
- Christmas Eve
- Stollen
- Yule
- Christmas in Nazi Germany
- Christmas worldwide / Central Europe
- Worldwide / German-speaking Europe

== References in German ==
=== Literature ===
- Helmut W. Diedrichs: Eine Studie auf Academia.edu: Das Profane um Jesu Geburt -- Wahrscheinlich war sie anders, als wir es meinen!
- Oscar Cullmenu: Die Entstehung des Weihnachtsfestes und die Herkunft des Weihnachtsbaumes (The Emergence of Christmas and the Origin of the Christmas Tree); Stuttgart: Source Publishing House, 19944; ISBN 3-7918-2326-4 (a solid and generally comprehensible explanation of Christmas from Christian view)
- Alexander Demandt: The Origin of Christmas, now in: derselbe: Sieben Siegel. Essays zur Kulturgeschichte; Köln-Weimar-Wien: (Essay on Cultural History; Cologne-Weimar-Vienna): Böhlau Verlag, 2005; P. 1-18 (scientifically fastidious and at the same time generally understandable study of the old-eastern-Jewish, anti-Christian and Germanic-German roots of Christmas)
- Henrik Cornell: The Iconography of the Nativity of Christ; Uppsala 1924
- Franz Joseph Dölger: Natalis Solis Invicti and Christian Christmas; in: Antike und Christentum 6.1976, 23 ff
- Hugo Elm: Das goldene Weihnachtsbuch: Description and representation of the origin, the celebration, the habits, legends and the faith of the Christmas season and at the same time guidance for decorating the Christian tree, the pyramid, as well as the application of the creche and Weihnachtsgärten. Schwetschke, resounds 1878 (Digitalisat ) Archives for Literature Science 2, 1952
- Leonhard Fendt: The today's conditions of research over the birth celebration Jesu to 25. XII. and over Epiphanias; in: Theological Literature Newspaper 78 (1953)
- Hans Förster: Christmas - A Tracing; Berlin: Kulturverlag Kadmos, 20052; ISBN 3-931659-47-X
- Konrad Onasch: Christmas in the Orthodox Church Year; Berlin: Evangelist Publishing House, 1958
- Susan K. Roll: Weihnachten/Weihnachtsfest/Weihnachtspredigt; in: TRE 35, P. 453-468; Berlin - New York: de Gruyter, 2003
- Lily Weiser-Aall: Artikel Weihnacht; in: Hand Dictionary of the German Faith, Bd. 9; Augsburg: Weltbild, 2005 (=Berlin: de Gruyter, 1941); ISBN 3-8289-0808-X
- Helmut W. Diedrichs: Eine Studie auf Academia.edu: Die Weisen aus dem Osten und der Stern von Bethlehem (Fake or Fact ?) Ekbatana versus Babylon

=== Explanations of Christmas in German Christianity ===
- www.ekhn.de Website of the Protestant Church in Hessen and Nassau
- www.katholisch.de Website of the Catholic Church in Germany Comments of Christian dignitaries to Christmas
- www.kirche-in-not.de Interview with Cardinal Leo Scheffczyk (Catholic)

=== Weihnachtsgottesdienste ===
- www.kigo-tipps.de planning of Children's Christmas Services by German author of the Federation of Evangelist Municipalities

=== Christmas in German art and children's literature ===
- www.icon-art.info Icons of the Birth of Christ
- Weihnachtsgeschichten für Kinder und Jugendliche Christmas children's services (in German) at Buechernachlese

=== Critical analyses ===
- www.religio.de Thomas Gandow: Die Quadratur des Adventskranzes or: "Atheism Under the Christmas Tree“
