= Death Takes a Holiday (disambiguation) =

Death Takes a Holiday is a 1934 film starring Fredric March, Evelyn Venable and Guy Standing.

Death Takes a Holiday may also refer to:

- Death Takes a Holiday (1971 film)
- Death Takes a Holiday (musical)
- "Death Takes a Holiday", an episode of the ninth season of M*A*S*H
- "Death Takes a Holiday", an episode of the fourth season of Supernatural

== See also ==
- Death Makes a Holiday, a non-fiction book by David J. Skal
