= Michael Z. Lewin =

American writer of mystery fiction (born 1942)

- Born: Michael Zinn Lewin; 1942 (age 83–84); Springfield, Massachusetts, U.S.
- Education: Harvard University
- Occupation: Writer
- Children: Liz Lewin, Roger Lewin
- Writing career
- Genre: Mystery fiction
- Website: www.michaelzlewin.com

Michael Zinn Lewin (born 1942 in Springfield, Massachusetts) is an American writer of mystery fiction perhaps best known for his series about Albert Samson, a low-keyed, private detective who plies his trade in Indianapolis, Indiana. Samson's was arguably the first truly regional series for a private-eye, beginning with Ask the Right Question, published in 1971.

Lewin himself grew up in Indianapolis, but after graduating from Harvard University and living for a few years in Bridgeport, Connecticut and then New York City, he moved to England where he has lived since 1971. However, much of his fiction continues to be set in Indianapolis, including a second series about Leroy Powder, a confrontational Indy police officer who also sometimes appears in the Samson novels. Samson and Powder also feature in short stories. The Samson and Powder novels and stories have been widely praised.

Another series is set in Bath, Somerset in England, where Lewin now lives. This features the Lunghis who run their detective agency as a family business. There are three novels and several short stories about them.

Lewin has also written a number of stand-alone novels. Some have been set in Indianapolis and others elsewhere. One novel, Confessions of a Discontented Deity, is even set largely in Heaven. A satire, it is one of a number of Lewin's works that break from traditional genre fiction. Other examples are Rover's Tales (short stories that view humanity from below, compared to Deity's view from above), Cutting Loose (a historical novel that moves from Indiana to London in the 19th century), Men Like Us (whose central character is an American from Indiana trying to find redemption in London), and Whatever It Takes, a short dystopian novel which has also been viewed by some as satire.

Lewin is the son of Leonard C. Lewin, author of the 1967 bestselling satire The Report from Iron Mountain: On the Possibility and Desirability of Peace. Leonard C. Lewin also wrote as L. L. Case.

A new book on the history and effects of Iron Mountain will be published in the spring of 2025 in the US and UK. Ghosts of Iron Mountain: The Hoax of the Century, Its Enduring Impact, and What It Reveals about America Today, it has been written by British journalist Phil Tinline.

His sister is Julie E. Lewin, a nationally known advocate on animal issues and the author of highly influential "Get Political for Animals and Win the Laws They Need."

== Works ==
=== Albert Samson ===
Samson tells his stories in the first-person narrative form typical of many private-eye novels. They are witty, and they are off-beat, both for their plotting and setting and for the sharply drawn relationships that Samson has with his mother, who owns a luncheonette, and with his long-time but nameless girlfriend. In more recent work Samson's daughter features significantly. What about his late father? That relationship is described in "A Question of Fathers" first published in 2014 in Ellery Queen's Mystery Magazine.

Samson neither drinks regularly nor chases women in the manner characteristic of his fictional confrères. He does not own a gun, makes modest meals for himself, and shoots hoops in the park as a recreation. Although the stories start off in an understated fashion about seemingly trivial domestic matters, they eventually escalate to scenes of sometimes startling violence. Of major importance in the stories is the city of Indianapolis and, occasionally, other locales in Indiana. One novel, "And Baby Will Fall", focuses on Samson's long term romantic interest. Although not named in the Samson novels, Adele Buffington is the lead character in the book and both Samson and Powder also appear. The book was adapted as a television movie in Japan (as was the Samson novel, "Missing Woman".

Among the several Samson short stories are four with a recurring client. These have been collected in Alien Quartet (2018). "A Question of Fathers" is the fourth story in this collection.

=== Leroy Powder ===
Powder began life as a reaction to the raft of fictional cops who ignore the rules and do "it" their own way. Powder is a stickler for doing things properly as a Lieutenant in the Indianapolis Police Department. He loves to "help" other officers become a "better" cops. However Powder's personal life is a bit more complicated than the rulebook.

The first Powder book in particular, "Night Cover", was a fresh breath in crime fiction in 1976 and even received a rave review in The New Yorker.

== Biblio ==
=== Albert Samson novels ===
- Ask the Right Question, Putnam, New York, 1971
- The Way We Die Now, Putnam, New York, 1973
- The Enemies Within, Knopf, New York, 1974
- The Silent Salesman, Knopf, New York, 1978
- Missing Woman, Knopf, New York, 1981
- Out of Season, Morrow, New York, 1984; British title: Out of Time, Macmillan, 1984
- Called by a Panther, Mysterious Press, New York, 1991
- Eye Opener, Five Star, 2004

=== Leroy Powder novels ===
- Night Cover, Knopf, New York, 1976
- Hard Line, Morrow, New York, 1982 – 1988 Maltese Falcon Award, Japan
- Late Payments, Morrow, New York, 1986

=== Other Indianapolis novels ===
- Outside In, Knopf, New York, 1980
- And Baby Will Fall, Morrow, New York, 1988
- Underdog, Mysterious Press, New York, 1993
- Oh Joe, Five Star, 2008

=== Lunghi Family ===
- Family Business, Foul Play, 1995
- Family Planning, St. Martin's Press, New York, 1999
- Family Way, Five Star, 2011

=== Stand alone novels ===
- The Next Man, Warner, 1976 (Novelization of the screenplay by Morton Fine, Alan Trustman, David M. Wolf and Richard Sarafian)
- Cutting Loose, Holt, New York, 1999
- Confessions of a Discontented Deity Smashwords 2013, Gatekeeper 2022
- Men Like Us, iUniverse, 2021
- Whatever It Takes, Gatekeeper 2022

=== Short story collections ===
- Telling Tails, PawPaw 1994
- Rover's Tales (St Martin's)
- The Reluctant Detective, (Crippen & Landru, 2001 (Including two Edgar nominated stories)
- Family Trio 2011 Amazon Kindle (three Lunghi family stories).
- Alien Quartet 2018 iUniverse (four Albert Samson stories)

== Various awards and recognitions ==
Edgar nominations from Mystery Writers of America:

- Ask the Right Question Best First Novel
- The Reluctant Detective Best Short Story
- If the Glove Fits Best Short Story

Maltese Falcon for the best foreign mystery novel of the year in Japan: "Hard Line", 1988.

The "Marlowe" for best crime novel of the year by the Raymond Chandler Society in Germany for "Called by a Panther" in 1992.

Lifetime Achievement from Magna cum Murder (Muncie, Indiana) in 1994.

The Shamus Award for Best Short Story of 2011 for "Who I Am".

Nominated for Best Thriller Short Story of 2011 at Thrillercon, "Anything to Win".

Nominated for Shamus Award for Best Short Story of 2013 for "Extra Fries".

Private Eye Writers of America Life Achievement Award, "The Eye" in 2021.
