= Elias Savada =

American film historian and critic

Elias Savada is an American film historian and critic. Since 1977, he has owned and operated the Motion Picture Information Service, which has provided customized copyright research reports to over 1,200 clients.

== Biography ==
The son of New York record store owner Morton Savada, Savada is the founder of the Motion Picture Information Service, which provides copyright research for film and television show producers. He has been a member of the American Film Institute, and compiled the organization's Catalog of Motion Pictures Produced in the United States: Film Beginnings, 1893-1910, which was published in 1995. His film reviews have appeared at online sites Film Threat and Rotten Tomatoes.

Savada collaborated with fellow film historian David J. Skal on the 1995 book Dark Carnival: The Secret World of Tod Browning, Hollywood's Master of the Macabre. The book was the first major biography of Tod Browning, a horror film director known for his work on Freaks, Dracula, and several Lon Chaney Sr. films.

A revised version is scheduled for publication in 2017 by Centipede Press. Writing in the Journal of Popular Film and Television, Martin F. Norden called Dark Carnival "a compelling, in-depth examination of one of America's first cult film directors". Steven Alford of the Houston Chronicle wrote that the book "succeeds in resurrecting the reputation of one of Hollywood's long-buried eccentrics".
