= Halloween ABC =

1987 children's poetry book

- Front cover
- Author: Eve Merriam
- Illustrator: Lane Smith
- Language: English
- Genre: Children's poetry
- Publisher: Macmillan
- Publication date: 1987
- Publication place: USA
- Pages: 28 (unnumbered)
- ISBN: 978-00-2766870-4

Halloween ABC is a book of poetry for children, written by Eve Merriam and illustrated by Lane Smith. It includes a poem related to a scary or Halloween related theme for each letter of the alphabet.

== Reception ==
Kirkus Reviews calls it "elegant in design, precise in image, this is a sophisticated style that should be popular for its subject, with appeal for any age that enjoys the macabre side of Halloween". Publishers Weekly describes the poems as "fresh, original creations" and "illustrator Smith is a perfect accomplice..." The School Library Journal recommends Halloween ABC for children K and up, and states that: "This is not a book for young children to learn the alphabet, but it is a witty, whimsical, and happily shivery book for Halloween sharing. It is also a wonderful book for monster- and horror-loving youngsters at any time of the year and a diabolic way for poetry-loving adults to introduce the work of one of our best contemporary poets [...]"

== Challenged book ==
Halloween ABC is on the American Library Association list of the 100 Most Frequently Challenged Books of 1990–2000 as "it allegedly contains demonic references, cult symbols, and promotes violent and deviant behavior".

== See also ==
- Bibliography of Halloween
