= The Scary Sleepover =

Children's picture book

- Author: Ulrich Karger
- Original title: Geisterstunde im Kindergarten
- Translator: J. Alison James
- Illustrator: Uli Waas
- Language: German
- Genre: Children's
- Publisher: North South Books
- Publication date: 2002
- Publication place: Germany
- English publication date: 2002
- Media type: Picture book
- Pages: 24
- ISBN: 0-7358-1712-X (hardcover-edition)
- OCLC: 48767627
- Dewey Decimal: [E] 21
- LC Class: PZ7.K134 Sc 2002

The Scary Sleepover is a children's picture book, written for children between three and six years of age. The story is written by Ulrich Karger and illustrated by Uli Waas.

== Plot summary ==
The book tells about a group of children having a Halloween sleepover party at school (Kindergarten). The children prepare for it by making decorations and costumes. As night draws near, so do the children's fears. One student, Mary, shares a trick her father taught her with the other students. He gave her a special bright star - whenever she feels afraid to go to bed, she has only to think about her star. This sends the darkness and the evil ghosts from her heart. Jonas does not believe in that, but he also thinks he is not afraid of ghosts. In the end, all the children need another, older trick: keeping the hallway light on all night.

== Themes ==
The Scary Sleepover focuses on children who learn to overcome their fears of the dark by the example of a Halloween sleepover at school. Incidentally is detected: "The most boastful of the children becomes the most afraid. The Halloween setting with masks and long shadows in the dark is the perfect backdrop for this discussion".

== Reception ==
Vicki Arkoff positively evaluates the text and the illustrations, but sees a problem especially for American readers: "Right off the bat it's clear that this simple picture book is a translated work because of its 'this would never happen in this country' premise. After all, how many parents do you know who let their pre-schoolers and kindergarteners have sleepovers at school? Sure enough it's a German tale about what happens during a Halloween sleepover party as nighttime falls and common fears begin to arise. (..) Putting the slightly awkward premise aside, this is a gently reassuring bedtime story sure to soothe bedtime jitters in homes everywhere". Stan Steiner sees in the book "a cute solution to help overcome those ghastly fears around Halloween".

== Book information ==
- ISBN 0-7358-1712-X (hardcover / North South Books, New York)
- ISBN 0-7358-1713-8 (library edition / North South Books, New York)
- ISBN 0-439-44863-8 (paperback for the school market / Scholastic Inc., New York)

In addition, this picture book with the illustrations by Uli Waas is published and translated also in the following languages:

- German original by Ulrich Karger: Geisterstunde im Kindergarten, 2002 ISBN 3-314-01151-2
- Dutch by Sander Hendriks: Spoken in de speelzaal, 2002 ISBN 90-5579-684-0
- French by Anne Ruck-Sultan: Halloween à l'école, 2002 ISBN 3-314-21536-3
- Italian by Alessandra Valtieri: Halloween all'asilo, 2002 ISBN 88-8203-504-2
- Slovene by Andreja Sabati-Suster: Ples duhov v otroškem vrtcu, 2002 ISBN 86-7823-284-6

== See also ==
- Bibliography of Halloween
