= It's Halloween =

Children's Picture book by Jack Prelutsky and Marylin Hafner

- Author: Jack Prelutsky
- Cover artist: Marylin Hafner
- Language: English
- Series: Greenwillow Read-alone books
- Subject: Halloween
- Genre: Children
- Publisher: Greenwillow Books (a division of William Morrow & Co., Inc.) (now owned by HarperCollins)
- Publication date: 1977
- Publication place: United States
- Media type: Print (hardcover, paperback)
- Pages: 64

It's Halloween is a 1977 picture book written by American author Jack Prelutsky and illustrated by Marylin Hafner. It is a collection of children's poems with a Halloween theme, and is one of Prelutsky's four holiday-themed books for beginning readers. The book was republished in October 2002 as Halloween Countdown, with pictures by American author and illustrator Dan Yaccarino.

The edition published by Scholastic Book Services (a division of Scholastic Inc.) omits one poem titled "Trick...". As a result, the subsequent poem "...or Treat" was retitled as simply "Treat". The Scholastic edition also omits several pages and illustrations.

== See also ==
- Bibliography of Halloween
