= Harriet's Halloween Candy =

1982 children's picture book by Nancy L. Carlson

- First edition cover
- Author: Nancy L. Carlson
- Language: English
- Series: Harriet series
- Genre: Children's literature Picture books
- Publisher: Carolrhoda Books
- Publication date: 1982
- Publication place: United States
- Media type: Print (hardcover)
- Pages: 32
- ISBN: 978-0-87614-182-3

Harriet's Halloween Candy is a 1982 children's picture book written and illustrated by Nancy L. Carlson. It was published by Carolrhoda Books.

== Summary ==
Harriet does not want to share her Halloween candy with her little brother. She is running out of places to hide her candy so she tries to think of a solution.

== Reception ==
- It was adapted into a play.
- The book is used in schools to teach number sorting.
- A math book uses the book to teach number sorting in schools.

== See also ==
- Bibliography of Halloween
