= Kemal Kurt =

- Born: 29 October 1947; Çorlu, Turkey
- Died: 21 October 2002 (aged 54); Berlin, Germany
- Occupations: Author, translator and photographer

Kemal Kurt (29 October 1947 – 21 October 2002) was an author, translator and photographer.

== Vita ==
- 1966–72 studies in Turkey and in United States
- since 1975 living in Berlin
- since 1977 artistic photography
- since 1981 first book publications
- 1983 PhD at the TU Berlin
- since 1990 working as a freelance writer
- Reading tours throughout Germany and Poland, Luxembourg, Netherlands, Austria, Turkey, Switzerland, South Africa, USA

Kemal Kurt has written:

- short stories
- novels
- poetry
- essays
- features
- children's books
- radio plays
- TV-filmscripts for children
- published photography.

The heart of his work was the writing and the storytelling for children, primarily in broadcasting, in particular for multiple ARD-channels simultaneously transferred "Ohrenbär"-series of the SFB.

For adults, he wrote:

- poetry,
- essays,
- short stories and
- satirical novels.

Was ist die Mehrzahl von Heimat? (1995), is a pointed reflection of his ambivalent relationship with a Turkish origin and the German way of life with his satirical novel Ja, sagt Molly (1998), in which he settles with the most brilliant of Literature.

For many years, the books of Kemal Kurt have also been part of the curriculum of several American universities.

That left behind a photo archive of Kemal Kurt including 20.000 images. A traveling exhibition of photos and poems he conceived, menschen.orte was put up thanks to his estate managers' part of current presentations.

== Awards/fellowships ==
In 1999 he had a friendship at the Villa Aurora (exile home of Lion Feuchtwanger) in Pacific Palisades, CA, in 2000 at the international writers' retreats Hawthornden Castle at Edinburgh and "Waves of Three Seas" at Rhodes, 2001 at Centrum for Arts & Creative Education in Port Townsend, WA.

In 1991 and 2000 he had support from the foundation Stiftung Preußische Seehandlung Berlin for children's fiction. "Wenn der Meddah kommt" was listed among the three best German children's books in the spring of 1996 by WDR, Radio Bremen and Saarländischer Rundfunk and "The five Fingers and the Moon" was chosen the Best Picture Book of the month December 1997 by the German Academy for Children's Books.

== Work ==
=== Books ===
==== Poetry / Photos / Prose ====
- Der Chinese von Schöneberg. stories. Berlin 2000, ISBN 3-924423-40-7
- menschen.orte. poetry & photos. ISBN 3-924423-37-7
- Ja, sagt Molly. novel. Berlin 1998, ISBN 3-924423-34-2
- Was ist die Mehrzahl von Heimat?. essay. Reinbek 1995, ISBN 3-499-13520-5
- Beim nächsten Ton. poetry. Berlin 1988
- Abuzer Güler. Gedichte. Berlin 1988
- Scheingedichte / Şiirimsi. poems, German / Turkey. Berlin 1988
- Bilder einer Kindheit. novel and photos. Berlin 1986
- ...weil wir Türken sind /...Türk olduğumuz için. photos and stories; German / Turkey. Berlin 1981

==== Children's Book ====
- Die Sonnentrinker. Berlin 2002, ISBN 3-357-00519-0
- Die verpatzten Zaubersprüche. Gossau-Zürich 2002, ISBN 3-314-00947-X

English (Marianne Martens): Mixed-up Journey to Magic Mountain
Italian (Andrea Passannante): Il mago pasticcione
French (Michelle Nikly): Demi-tour de magie
Dutch (Christine Kliphuis): De muslukte toverspreuk

- Yunus. Big Book for the knees. Berlin-München 2001

Danish: Det er mig
Luxembourgish: Dat sinn ech
Dutch: Dit ben ik

- Eine echt verrückte Nacht. Berlin 2001, ISBN 3-357-00905-6

Korean:

- Als das Kamel Bademeister war. Turkey Tales. Berlin 1998, ISBN 3-922825-64-8
- Cora die Korsarin. Hamburg 1998, ISBN 3-7915-1165-3
- Die Kinder vom Mondhügel. Hamburg 1997, ISBN 3-7915-1164-5
- Die fünf Finger und der Mond. picture book. Gossau-Zürich 1997, ISBN 3-314-00824-4

English (Anthea Bell): The Five Fingers and the Moon
French (Géraldine Elscher): La lune et les cinq doigts
Greek:
Dutch (Toby Visser) Vijf vingermannetjes op de maan

- Sieben Zimmer voller Wunder. Hamburg 1996, ISBN 3-7915-1163-7

Dutch (Yvonne Kloosterman): Zeven kamers vol wonderen

- Wenn der Meddah kommt. Turkey tales for children. Hamburg 1995, ISBN 3-7915-1162-9 and Stuttgart 1997, ISBN 3-12-262150-9

==== Translations: German-Turkish ====
- Hans de Beer: Kleiner Eisbär wohin fährst du? to Küçük beyaz ayı nereye gidiyorsun?, picture book, Gossau-Zürich 1994
- Hans de Beer: Kleiner Eisbär, hilf mir fliegen! to Küçük Beyaz Ayı, Yardım Et Uçayım!, Bilderbuch, Gossau-Zürich 1999
- Hans de Beer: Kleiner Eisbär, kennst du den Weg? to Küçük Beyaz Ayı Yolu Biliyor Musun?, Bilderbuch, Gossau-Zürich 2001
- Marcus Pfister: Der Regenbogenfisch to Gökkuşağı Balığı – picture books, Gossau-Zürich 1994
- Marcus Pfister: Der Regenbogenfisch schließt Frieden to Gökkuşğı Balığı Barışıyor – picture books, Gossau-Zürich 1998
- Marcus Pfister: Der Regenbogenfisch überwindet seine Angst to Gökkusağı Balığı Korkusunu Yeniyor – picture books, Gossau-Zürich 2000
- Marcus Pfister: Regenbogenfisch, komm hilf mir! to Gökkusağı Balığı, Bana Yardım Et! – picture books, Gossau-Zürich 2000
- Bahman Nirumand, Belge Yayınları: Iran – hinter den Gittern verdorren Blumen, Rowohlt, Reinbek 1985 ISBN 3-499-15735-7 to İran – Soluyor Çiçekler Parmaklıklar Ardında, Istanbul 1988

==== Translations: Turkish-German ====
- Gülten Dayıoğlu: Sık Dişini to Beiß die Zähne zusammen, together with V. Augustin and E. Giere, Berlin 1981

=== TV-Screenplays ===
- to the ZDF-series: Karfunkel – Stories with children of the whole world
- Auf den Spuren von Lakatosch. (R: Alejandro Quintano) 1994
- Can und Oleg. (R: Yasemin Akay) 1994
- Heimliche Weihnacht. (R: Yasemin Akay), 1992
- Öffnen Sie den Koffer, Herr Özyurt!. (R: Thomas Dräger), 1991

=== Broadcasting ===
==== Autobiographical, essays, stories, commentaries, live presentations ====
- Autorenporträt. Series Domino, HR, 2001
- Aziz Nesin – Das schlaflose Gewissen der Türkei. Series Wortspiel, DeutschlandRadio 1995
- Die Meinung beim Früh-Stück. commentaries à 3 min. SFB 1994–1998
- Livevortrag eigener Gedichte mit dem Musiker Hasan Kuzu. Unterhaltung am Samstag, WDR 1992–1993
- Ein Leben in Anatolien. SDR 1992
- Die Crux mit der Sprache. Passagen, SFB 1992
- Keine Vorkommnisse an der Grenzübergangsstelle / Faralya. stories. Literatur auf 1, RIAS 1988
- Der Chinese von Schöneberg / Die Traumdeuterin. stories. Radio 100, West-Berlin 1988
- Ich kann Dir nicht mehr in die Augen schauen. story. WDR 1985

==== Stories for Children ====
- Als das Kamel Bademeister war. Domino, HR, 2000
- Hakan und der kleine Bär. Ohrenbär, SFB 1998
- Cora die Korsarin. Ohrenbär, SFB 1997
- Die traumhaften Reisen von Paula Pumpernickel und Emily Erdbeer. Ohrenbär, SFB 1996
- Das Mädchen, das Rätsel liebte. Panther und Co, DeutschlandRadio 1995
- Reise zum Zauberberg. Lilipuz, WDR 1995
- Mehr vom Mondhügel. Ohrenbär, SFB 1995
- Ein Stadtbummel durch Istanbul. Panther und Co, DeutschlandRadio 1995
- Keloglans Streiche. Ohrenbär, SFB 1993
- Als das Kamel Ausrufer und der Floh Barbier war. Ohrenbär, SFB 1992
- Fingergeschichten. Ohrenbär, SFB 1991
- Eine Reise von A wie Aitmatow bis Z wie Zuckmayer. Passagen, SFB 1991
- Zurück in Aytepe. Passagen, SFB 1990
- Ein Haus mit sieben Zimmern. Ohrenbär, SFB 1990
- Vom Mondhügel. Ohrenbär, SFB 1989

=== Others ===
- Ulrich Karger (Hrsg.): Briefe von Kemal Kurt (1947–2002) − mit Kommentaren, Nachrufen und Rezensionen. Paperback 2013, ISBN 978-1-4818-7999-6 (E-Book: EAN/ISBN 978-3-8476-2863-7)

== Personal life ==
Kurt was of Turkish Bulgarian origin.
