= Leonard C. Lewin =

American writer (1916–1999)

Leonard C. Lewin (October 2, 1916 – January 28, 1999) was an American writer, best known as the author of the bestseller The Report from Iron Mountain (1967). He also wrote Triage (1972), a novel about a covert group dedicated to killing people it considers to be not worth having around.

A book about the history and effects of The Report from Iron Mountain was published in the US and UK early in the spring of 2025. Called Ghosts of Iron Mountain: The Hoax of the Century, Its Enduring Impact, and What It Reveals about America Today it has been written by British journalist Phil Tinline.

== Personal life ==
Lewin graduated from Harvard University. Before becoming a writer, he worked as a labor organizer in New England and in his father's sugar refinery in Indianapolis, Indiana. He was twice married: first to Iris Elizabeth Zinn and later to poet, playwright and children's book author Eve Merriam. Both marriages ended in divorce. Later, his "longtime companion" was Lorraine Davis. He is survived by his two children, Julie - an author and activist for animal rights - and Michael Z. Lewin, author of many novels, short stories and radio plays - most, but not all, in the mystery genre.

== The Report from Iron Mountain ==
In the original 1967 publication of The Report From Iron Mountain, written at the suggestion of Victor Navasky, Lewin was credited only as the author of the introduction to a purported government report that concluded that if a lasting peace "could be achieved, it would almost certainly not be in the best interests of society to achieve it."

Some conspiracy theorists continue to believe that the book is an actual, top-secret government document, rather than a hoax or satire, despite Lewin's claims to the contrary. Lewin successfully sued to establish his copyright over the work in a case brought when the Report was published without the consent of Lewin or the original publisher, Dial Press. The prospective publisher, the Liberty Lobby, had argued that as an authentic U.S. government document, the report was in the public domain. The parties settled out of court with Liberty Lobby agreeing to pay Lewin an undisclosed sum and return over a thousand unsold copies.

Lewin first claimed that the report was a hoax in 1972, writing that the Pentagon Papers were "as outrageous, morally and intellectually" as his own satiric creation: "The charade is over. Some of the documents read like parodies of Iron Mountain, rather than the reverse."
