= Bahman Nirumand =

Iranian-German journalist and author (born 1936)

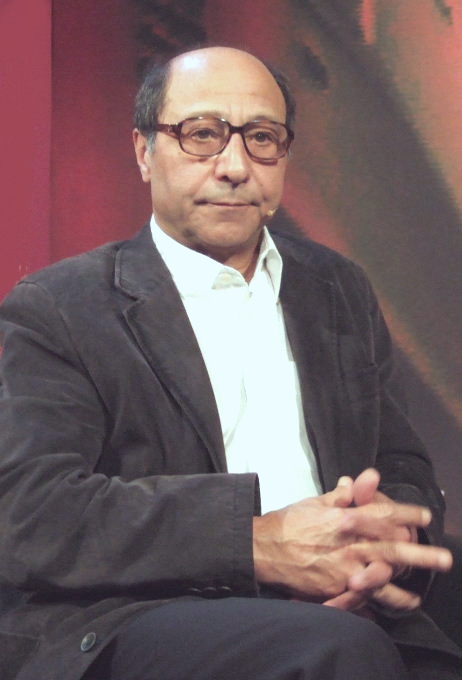
- Born: September 18, 1936 (age 90); Tehran, Iran
- Occupations: Scholar and Journalist

Bahman Nirumand (Persian: بهمن نیرومند; born 18 September 1936 in Tehran) is an Iranian and German journalist and author.

== Life ==
Bahman Nirumand was born on 18 September 1936 to a wealthy family of civil servants in Tehran, Iran. His uncle was a consul in the Iranian embassy in Berlin before World War II. When he was 14 years old, Nirumand was sent to Germany to go to gymnasium, and attended Rudolf Steiner School.

After his primary and secondary schooling, he studied German, philosophy and Persian at the Ludwig-Maximilians-Universität München, the University of Tübingen, and the Humboldt University of Berlin. He became a docent in 1960 at the University of Tübingen with the subject "Problems of transplanting European dramas to Neo-Persian literature". After finishing his studies, he returned to Iran and worked there as a docent for comparative literature at the University of Tehran, and as a writer and journalist. Together with Mehdi Khanbaba Tehrani and Majid Zarbakhsh, he founded the Goruhe Kadreh (Kader Group), which understood itself as a Marxist-Leninist organization and wanted to organize revolutionary cells for the anti-imperialist war in urban areas of Iran by acting as urban guerillas. In 1965, he returned to Germany to escape a purported imminent arrest.

His book, Iran, The New Imperialism in Action, was published in January 1967 and had a large influence upon the internationalism of the May 1968 student uprising. (Note: On the influence of Nirumand's work on the West German New Left, see Quinn Slobodian, Foreign Front: Third World Politics in Sixties West Germany Duke University Press, chapter 5) Nirumand became a member of the Confederation of Iranian students. Freimut Duve invited him on a lecture tour for his book in Hamburg, and he became acquainted with Ulrike Meinhof. They talked about the circumstances in Iran, whereupon in June 1967, for the official visit of Shah Mohammad Reza Pahlavi to West Germany, Meinhof alleged in an open letter to Shah's wife, Farah Diba, that, among other things, for the peasants of Mehdiabad, a "Persian meal" consists of straw put in water. In October 1967, Der Spiegel published a critical review of Nirumand's book, alleging that much of the information it contained was dubious or wrong.

1979 Nirumand returned to Iran before the Islamic Republic of Iran was founded. After staying there for three years, Nirumand exiled in Paris, as he had not received permission to re-enter Germany. He later relocated to Berlin.

Nirumand advocates for freedom in Iran. He holds that the forces around Ahmadinejad are sustained through terror and threats from the West, including the threats of sanctions and war. He believes that such actions bolster the regime and that popular support for the regime is much weaker than is assumed in the West. He contends that artists, women, and the youth are not radicals and desire freedom. Nirumand argues that the image of Iran in the West has been reduced to that of only the Islamic regime itself.

Nirumand is the author of several books and articles, including:

- "Die Zeit"
- "Der Spiegel"
- "Die Tageszeitung"
- "Frankfurter Rundschau"

In addition to that, he authored numerous contributions that have been broadcast. He published, among others:

- "Mit Gott für die Macht" ("With God for power"), a Khomeini-biography
- "Feuer unterm Pfauenthron. Verbotene Geschichten aus dem persischen Widerstand" ("Fire under the Peacock's Throne: Forbidden stories from the Persian opposition")
- "Iran - hinter den Gittern verdorren Blumen" ("Iran - behind the bars wither flowers")
- "Sturm im Golf: Die Irak-Krise und das Pulverfass Nahost" ("Storm in the Gulf: The Iraq crisis and the Powder Keg Middle East"

In addition, he has translated literature from Persian into German, among others:

- Sadegh Hedayat
- Gholamhossein Saedi
- Samad Behrangi
- He translated "The trip" of Mahmud Doulatabadi for the Unionsverlag.

Since 2001, he has been the composer of the monthly "Iran Reports" of the Heinrich Böll Foundation.

Bahman Nirumand is the father of the journalist Mariam Lau, who is currently working as the political correspondent of the weekly journal Die Zeit.

== Works ==
=== As an author ===
- “Problems of transplanting European dramas to the Neopersian literature” (“Probleme der Verpflanzung des europäischen Dramas in die neupersische Literatur”). University of Tübingen. Dissertation, 1960.
- “Persia, a model of a developing nation or the dictatorship of the Free World” (“Persien, Modell eines Entwicklungslandes oder Die Diktatur der Freien Welt”), Rowohlt, Reinbek 1967
- Nirumand, Bahman (1969). IRAN: The New Imperialism in Action. Monthly Review Press. p. 192. ISBN 978-0-853-45085-6.
- “With God for power. A political biography of Ayatollah Khomeiny” (“Mit Gott für die Macht. Eine politische Biografie des Ayatollah Chomeini.“), Rowohlt, Reinbek 1987, ISBN 3-498-04628-4 (mit Keywan Daddjou)
- “Fire under the peacock throne. Forbidden stories from the Persisan opposition” (“Feuer unterm Pfauenthron. Verbotene Geschichten aus dem persischen Widerstand“, Rotbuch Verlag, Hamburg 1985, ISBN 3-88022-124-3
- “Iran - behind the bars wither flowers“ (“Iran - hinter den Gittern verdorren Blumen“), Rowohlt, Reinbek 1985 ISBN 3-499-15735-7 (Übersetzung ins Türkische durch Kemal Kurt: “Iran – Soluyor Çiçekler Parmaklıklar Ardında“, mit Belge Yayınlar, Istanbul 1988)
- Living with Germans" (“Leben mit den Deutschen“), Rowohlt, Reinbek 1989, ISBN 3-499-12404-1
- “Storm in the Golf: The Iraq crisis and the powder keg Middle East“ ("Sturm im Golf: Die Irak-Krise and das Pulverfass Nah-Ost“), Rowohlt, Reinbek 1990, ISBN 3-499-12926-4
- “A stranger for Germans“ (“Fremd bei den Deutschen“), 1991, ISBN 3-499-12924-8
- “The Kurdish tragedy. The Kurds - Chased in their own land” (“Die kurdische Tragödie. Die Kurden - verfolgt im eigenen Land“), Rowohlt, Reinbek 1991, ISBN 3-499-13075-0
- “Scared of Germans. Terror against foreigners and the disintegration of the state of law” (“Angst vor den Deutschen. Terror gegen Ausländer und der Zerfall des Rechtsstaates“), Rowohlt, Reinbek 1992, ISBN 3-499-13176-5
- “iran-report“, Heinrich Böll endowment, Berlin, seit 2001 (erscheint monatlich; siehe Weblinks)
- Bahman, Nirumand (2001). At the Side of Torture Survivors: Treating a Terrible Assault on Human Dignity. Johns Hopkins University Press. (Contributing Author)
- "Iran. The imminent catastrophe" ("Iran. Die drohende Katastrophe"), Kiepenheuer & Witsch, Köln 2006, ISBN 3-462-03708-0
- "The undeclared World War" ("Der unerklärte Weltkrieg"), booklet, 2007, ISBN 978-3-940153-01-2
- Bahman, Nirumand (2011). Weit entfernt von dem Ort, an dem ich sein müsste: Autobiographie. Rowohlt Verlag GmbH.
- "Iran Israel War: The spark to a bush fire" (“Iran Israel Krieg: Der Funke zum Flächenbrand“), Verlag Klaus Wagenbach, 2012, ISBN 978-3803126979
- Bahman, Nirumand (2013). Nilufar. Unionsverlag. ISBN 978-3-293-00455-9
- Bahman, Nirumand (2013). And what about Human Rights?: The West's Policy on the Middle East Needs to Be CredibleAnd what about Human Rights?: The West's Policy on the Middle East Needs to Be Credible. edition Körber-Stiftung. (Contributing Author)
- Bahman, Nirumand (2015). Und das ist erst der Anfang: Deutschland und die Flüchtlinge. Rowohlt Taschenbuch. (Contributing Author)
- Bahman, Nirumand (2017). Migration und Rassismus: Politik der Menschenfeindlichkeit. Eine Publikation der NGfP (Forschung Psychosozial). Psychosozial-Verlag. (Contributing Author)
- Nirumand, Bahman (2022). Der mühsame Weg in die Freiheit: Iran zwischen Gottesstaat und Republik. zu Klampen Verlag. p. 239.

=== As a publisher ===
- “In the name of Allah. Islamic groups and the fundamentalism ın the Federal Republic of Germany” (“Im Namen Allahs. Islamische Gruppen und der Fundamentalismus in der Bundesrepublik Deutschland“), 1990, ISBN 3-89452-307-7
- “In the name of Allah“ (“Im Namen Allahs“), Dreisam Verlag, Köln 1990, ISBN 3-89607-346-X
- “German conditions. Dialog over a endangered country“ (“Deutsche Zustände. Dialog über ein gefährdetes Land“, Rowohlt, Reinbek 1993, ISBN 3-499-13354-7
- “Iran after the polls“ (“Iran nach den Wahlen“), Westfälisches Dampfboot, Münster 2001, ISBN 3-89691-506-1

=== As a translator (a choice of) ===
- Sadegh Hedayat: “The blind owl“ (“Die blinde Eule - Ein Roman and neun Erzählungen“), Eichborn, Frankfurt 1990
- Mahmud Doulatabadi: “The journey“ (“Die Reise“), Unionsverlag, Zürich 1992, ISBN 3-293-20139-3
- Mahmud Doulatabadi: “The old World“ (“Die alte Erde“), Unionsverlag Zürich 2005, ISBN 3-293-20318-3
- Mahmud Doulatabadi: “The colonel” (“Der Colonel”), Unionsverlag Zürich 2009, ISBN 3-293-00402-4
