= David J. Skal =

American cultural critic (1952–2024)

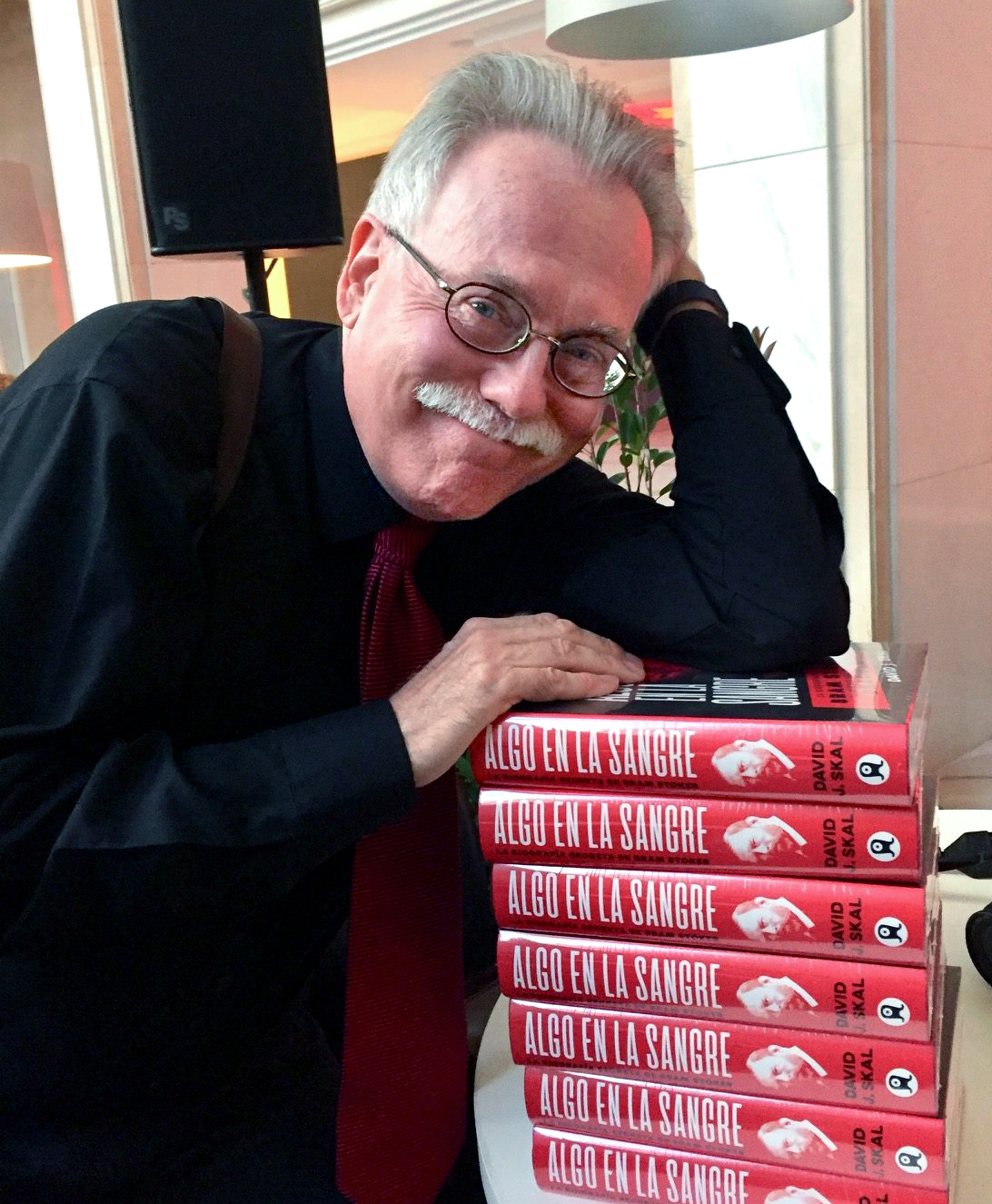
- Skal in 2017
- Born: June 21, 1952; Garfield Heights, Ohio, U.S.
- Died: January 1, 2024 (aged 71); Glendale, California, U.S.
- Education: Ohio University
- Occupations: Film critic/assistant editor; writer; cultural historian; on-camera commentator
- Known for: Horror films, horror literature
- Partner: Robert Postawko

David John Skal (June 21, 1952 – January 1, 2024) was an American cultural historian, critic, writer, and on-camera commentator known for his research and analysis of horror films, horror history and horror culture.

== Early life ==
David John Skal was born in Garfield Heights, Ohio, on June 21, 1952. He studied journalism at Ohio University, where he worked as a film critic and assistant editor for the college's newspaper. He graduated with a bachelor's degree in 1974. After graduation, he interned with the National Endowment for the Arts and became the publicity director for the Hartford Stage Company.

Skal later held positions with the American Conservatory Theater in San Francisco and the Theatre Communications Group of New York. During the 1980s, Skal completed three science fiction novels: Scavengers (1980), When We Were Good (1981), and Antibodies (1988).

== Non-fiction writing ==
Skal authored and edited various books, mostly on cult film history, and contributed forewords and essays to many others. His first non-fiction work was 1990's Hollywood Gothic: The Tangled Web of Dracula from Novel to Stage to Screen. This book discusses the various adaptations of Bram Stoker's 1897 novel Dracula, and the role of the vampire archetype in popular culture. A large portion of the book describes the efforts of Stoker's widow Florence to protect the rights to her husband's work. The book also contains the first in-depth study of a Spanish-language Dracula film produced in 1931. Kathleen Quinn of The New York Times praised Hollywood Gothic, writing, "Skal tracks Transylvania's most popular vampire with dry wit and the skills of a fine detective." Kenneth Turan of the Los Angeles Times called it "witty and comprehensive", and quipped that it was "something to gnaw on long after those trick-or-treaters are gone". Writing in 2004, David Colton of USA Today noted that the book had "become one of the field's essential reads" and had "[raised] the standards for horror researchers".

In 1993, Skal released his second non-fiction book, titled The Monster Show: A Cultural History of Horror. In this book, Skal analyzes the history of horror films, drawing parallels between those films and the cultural crises of their times, such as World War I, World War II, the thalidomide controversies, and the AIDS epidemic. M.L. Lyke of the Seattle Post-Intelligencer called The Monster Show "the perfect intellectual primer for a Halloween weekend". Stefan Dziemianowicz of The Washington Post argued that some of Skal's arguments were "pretty far-fetched", but added that, as a whole, the book "offers persuasive evidence that in order to understand a culture, you must know what it fears".

Skal collaborated with Elias Savada to produce 1995's Dark Carnival: The Secret World of Tod Browning, Hollywood's Master of the Macabre. Dark Carnival was the first book-length biography of Tod Browning, best known for directing Freaks and the 1931 version of Dracula. Writing in the Journal of Popular Film and Television, Martin F. Norden described it as "a compelling, in-depth examination of one of America's first cult film directors". Steven E. Alford of the Houston Chronicle remarked, "Dark Carnival succeeds in resurrecting the reputation of one of Hollywood's long-buried eccentrics."

Skal's other major publications include V Is for Vampire: The A to Z Guide to Everything Undead (1996), Screams of Reason: Mad Science and Modern Culture (1998), Death Makes a Holiday: A Cultural History of Halloween (2002), and Claude Rains: An Actor's Voice (2008). Skal also co-edited the 1997 Norton Critical Edition of Bram Stoker's Dracula and compiled the 2001 anthology Vampires: Encounters with the Undead. His biography of Bram Stoker, Something in the Blood, was published in October 2016.

Skal regularly contributed film reviews to The Magazine of Fantasy and Science Fiction.

== Bibliography ==
=== Fiction ===
- Scavengers (1980)
- When We Were Good (1981)
- Antibodies (1988)

=== Nonfiction ===
- Graphic Communications for the Performing Arts (1981)
- Theatre Profiles 4 (1981) editor
- Hollywood Gothic: The Tangled Web of Dracula from Novel to Stage to Screen (1990)
- Dracula: The Ultimate, Illustrated Edition of the World-Famous Vampire Play (1993) editor
- The Monster Show: A Cultural History of Horror (1993)
- Dark Carnival: The Secret World of Tod Browning (1995) with Elias Savada
- V is for Vampire: The A-Z Guide to Everything Undead (1996)
- Screams of Reason: Mad Science in Modern Culture (1998)
- Vampires: Encounters With the Undead (2001)
- Death Makes a Holiday: A Cultural History of Halloween (2002)
- Romancing the Vampire: Collectors Vault (2009)
- Something in the Blood: The Untold Story of Bram Stoker, the Man Who Wrote Dracula (2016)
- Halloween: The History of America’s Darkest Holiday (2016)
- Claude Rains: An Actor's Voice (2020) with Jessica Rains
- Fright Favorites: 31 Movies to Haunt Your Halloween and Beyond (2020)

== Documentaries ==
Skal made numerous appearances in theatrical, televised and home video documentaries, such as The 100 Scariest Movie Moments and The Perfect Scary Movie. He wrote, produced and directed DVD supplemental documentaries and/or audio commentaries for a number of films, including Dracula (1931), Frankenstein (1931), Freaks (1932), The Mummy (1932), The Invisible Man (1933), Bride of Frankenstein (1935), The Wolf Man (1941), Abbott and Costello Meet Frankenstein (1948), Creature from the Black Lagoon (1954), and Gods and Monsters (1998).

Skal appeared in Wrangler: Anatomy of an Icon (2008) in which he discusses, as a gay cultural critic, the cultural impact of iconic gay pornographic film star Jack Wrangler.

== Audio commentaries ==
- The Unknown (1927)
- Dracula (1931)
- Freaks (1932)

== Personal life and death ==
Skal lived in Los Angeles, and was in a long-term relationship with Robert Postawko.

On January 1, 2024, Skal and Postawko were involved in a traffic collision in Glendale, California, when a vehicle crossed into their lane and struck their car head-on. Skal died in the crash at the age of 71, while Postawko initially survived but eventually died from his injuries on February 6.
