= Eve Merriam =

American poet (1916-1992)

- Born: Eva Moskovitz; July 19, 1916; Philadelphia, Pennsylvania, United States
- Died: April 11, 1992 (aged 75); Manhattan, New York, United States
- Education: Cornell University
- Occupation: Poet
- Spouse(s): Erwin Spitzer (m. 1939; div. 1947) Martin Michel (m. 1947; div. 1960) Leonard C. Lewin (m. 1963; div. 1980) Waldo Salt (m. 1983; died 1987)
- Children: 2 (with Michel)
- Relatives: Jennifer Salt (stepdaughter)
- Writing career
- Notable awards: Yale Younger Poets Prize; NCTE Award for Excellence in Poetry for Children

Eve Merriam (July 19, 1916 – April 11, 1992) was an American poet and writer.

== Writing career ==
Merriam's first book was the 1946 Family Circle, which won the Yale Younger Poets Prize. In 1956, she published Emma Lazarus: Woman with a Torch. Her book, The Inner City Mother Goose (1969), was described as one of the most banned books of the time. It inspired a 1971 Broadway musical called Inner City, later revived in 1982 under the title Street Dreams.

In 1981, she won the NCTE Award for Excellence in Poetry for Children. One of her books for children is Halloween ABC. She published over 30 books, and taught at both City College and New York University.

In 1977, composer Patsy Rogers used Merriam’s text for her opera Woman Alive: Conversation Against Death. The play Out of Our Father's House, adapted by Merriam, Jack Hofsiss and Paula Wagner from Merriam's book Growing Up Female in America, with music by Ruth Crawford Seeger, was televised on the Great Performances series in 1978.

== Personal life ==
Born Eva Moskovitz in Philadelphia, Pennsylvania, Eve Merriam was one of four children of Russian Jewish immigrants Max Moscovitz and Jennie Siegel. After graduating with an A.B. from the University of Pennsylvania in 1937, Merriam moved to New York to pursue graduate studies at Columbia University. She was married four times, with the first three ending in divorce: Erwin Spitzer (1939-1947), Martin Michel (1947-1960), and Leonard C. Lewin (1963-1980). She married screenwriter Waldo Salt in 1983 and remained with him until his death in 1987, and in the process became Jennifer Salt's stepmother.

=== Death ===
Merriam died on April 11, 1992, in Manhattan from liver cancer; she was 75.
