= Buechernachlese =

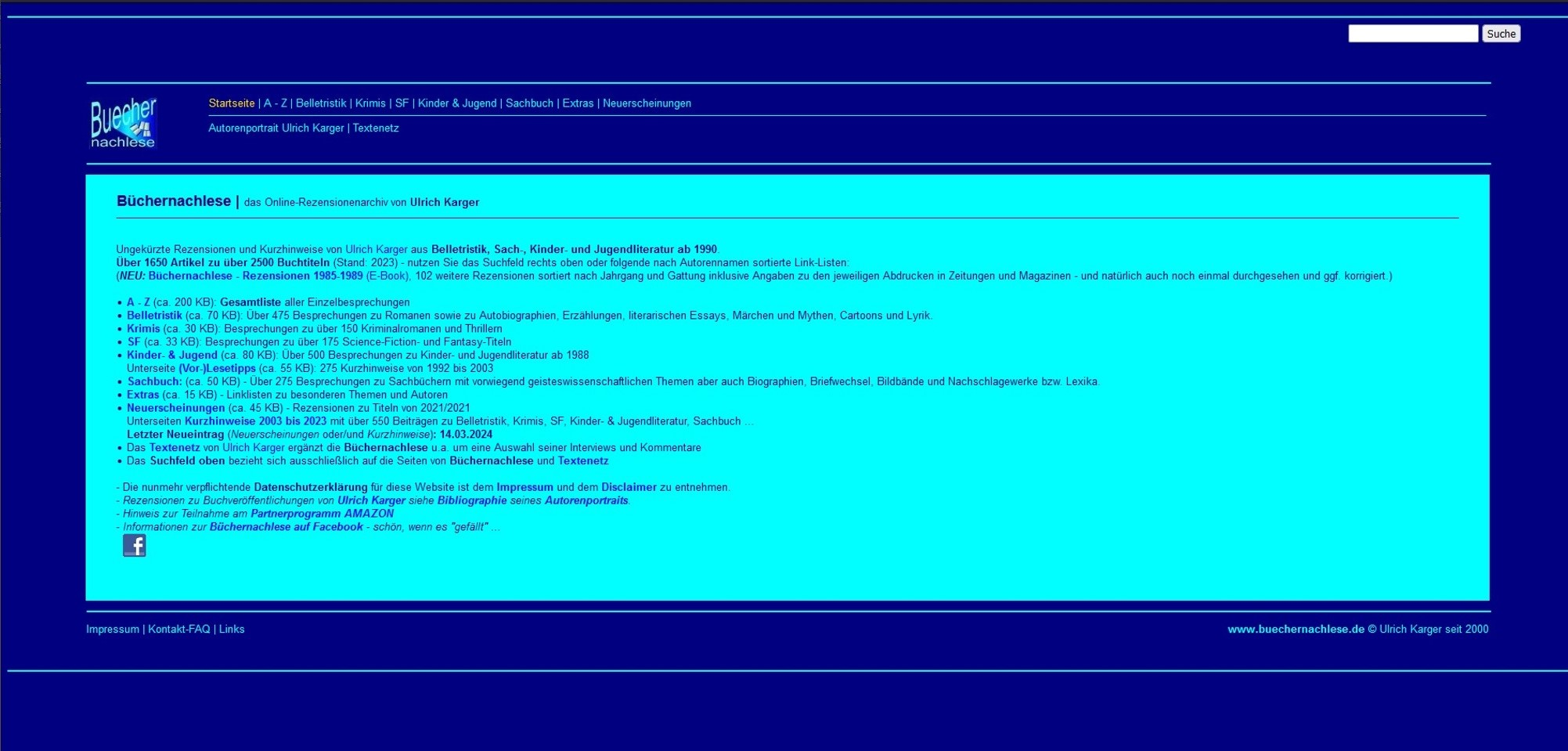
Screenshot of the main page

The Buechernachlese (or: Büchernachlese, translated: books gleanings) is established by Ulrich Karger as freely accessible online review archives in 2000. It contains more than 1,500 of his book reviews and brief references in German to literature and poetry, nonfiction and children's books as well as literature for young people.

In addition to his work as a book author, since 1985 Ulrich Karger has written many book reviews for various daily papers (e.g. for Der Tagesspiegel, Berliner Zeitung) and magazines.

In 1999 he established link lists on his home page, which referred to his reviews on other web portals and online newspapers. In October 2000 he started to incorporate all its pages with his reviews into his own website. His articles can be read there completely and unedited. Their scope ranges from a few lines to several pages, however the default size is about 1800 to 2400 punctuation marks. Quite a few of his reviews were also cited, among others in term papers, dissertations and as part of teacher materials.

== Bibliography ==
- Ulrich Karger: Büchernachlese – Rezensionen 1985-1989. Collection of reviews. E-book original edition 2019. ISBN 978-3-7485-8899-3.
