= The Report from Iron Mountain =

Book about war, allegedly from the US government

- Cover of 2008 edition
- Language: English
- Published: 1967
- Publisher: The Dial Press
- Publication place: United States

The Report from Iron Mountain is a 1967 anti-war satire written by Leonard C. Lewin. The book purports to be a leaked report authored by a Special Study Group tasked by the Kennedy Administration with planning the transition from a wartime economy and assessing the potential social impacts of a "condition of general world peace." It details the group's analyses, which concludes that world peace could cause the United States to collapse; war, or some alternative external threat, is necessary for social stability, the Study Group finds, and recommends the establishment of "a permanent War/Peace Research Agency" to improve "the effectiveness of [war's] major stabilizing functions" and to plan substitutes for war should "a viable general peace" emerge. The book became a New York Times bestseller and has been translated into fifteen languages.

== Publishing history ==
The idea for the report originated with Victor Navasky and other editors of Monocle, an American political satire magazine, after reading a newspaper account about a stock market decline attributed to a "peace scare." Leonard Lewin wrote the book with the help from economist John Kenneth Galbraith and three Monocle editors: Marvin Kitman, Richard Lingeman, and Victor Navasky. E. L. Doctorow, who was then editor-in-chief at The Dial Press, agreed to publish the book as non-fiction. To lend credibility to the hoax, Galbraith wrote a review under the pseudonym Herschel McLandress, "former professor of Psychiatric Measurement at the Harvard Medical School and now chief consultant to the Noonan Psychiatric Clinic in Boston," a fictional title character from Galbraith's earlier 1964 satire, The McLandress Dimension. The Report from Iron Mountain went out of print in 1980.

The book subsequently began circulating on the Internet among militia groups. Buccaneer Books, a small publisher of out-of-print books, brought out an edition in 1993. In the early 1990s, Liberty Lobby with the Noontide Press, a publisher notable for its many antisemitic and white supremacist texts, released an edition, claiming that it was a U.S. government document, and therefore inherently in the public domain, as is conventional for works created by the federal government. Lewin sued them for copyright infringement, which resulted in a settlement in 1994. According to The New York Times, "Neither side would reveal the full terms of the settlement, but Lewin received more than a thousand copies of the bootlegged version."

In 1996, in response to the unauthorized editions, historian Mitch Horowitz, then an editor at The Free Press, a division of Simon & Schuster, reissued a hardcover edition of Report From Iron Mountain in cooperation with its original authors and conceptualizers Navasky, Kitman, Lingeman, and chief writer Lewin. Journalist Phil Tinline wrote in his 2025 history of the book, Ghosts of Iron Mountain, that in corresponding over Navasky's foreword to the reissue, "its editor, Mitch Horowitz, encouraged him to address this question of why a left-wing satire had inspired the right. Were the two sides getting similar messages from it? Did it 'expose a sort of cognitive netherworld or fault-line of paranoia' that the two sides had in common?" The 1996 hardcover reissue appeared in paperback for the first time in 2008.

In his new afterword to the 1996 reissue, Lewin again emphasized the book's satirical nature: "The book is, of course, a satirical hoax--a fact not so obvious in 1967 and, disturbingly, still lost on some people today."

== Synopsis ==
The book is named after Iron Mountain, a decommissioned iron mine near Germantown, New York, in the Hudson Valley, which houses an enormous storage facility mostly holding important documents but also government records, musical instruments, antiques, and other valuables, as well as fallout shelters for executives of large oil corporations. The book's foreword describes how the Special Study Group's last meeting before drafting the final report was held at Iron Mountain (hence the name).

The book is a satirical parody of Rand Corporation projects which summarizes the results of a two-and-a-half-year study and recommends maintaining a state of permanent war. The first part of the book deals with its scope. The second is a review of previous studies considering the effects of disarmament on the economy. ("The first factor is that of size. The "world war industry, ... accounts for approximately a tenth of the output of the world's total economy.") The third assesses various "disarmament scenarios" that have been proposed. The main part of the book examines the non-military economic, political, sociological, cultural, and scientific functions of war and the problems that these raise for the transition to peace. These include war's role in regulating the economy's inevitable boom and bust cycles, defining any given "nation's existence vis-a-vis any other nation," rationalizing "nonmilitary killing" by habituating people to "pay a blood price for institutions," such as the sacrifice of 40,000 people per year to automobiles accidents, and so on. The report next suggests some substitutes for the non-military functions of war, including medical research, health care for all citizens, improved education, housing, public transportation, poverty reduction, and so forth, but ultimately notes that these do not answer the need for an external threat to maintain social stability. The report suggests some alternative enemy could be manufactured, such as hostile space aliens or the threat of environmental pollution, which, the authors say, is not yet dire enough but could be "increased selectively for this purpose." The report ultimately concludes "that the war system cannot responsibly be allowed to disappear." The report suggests the establishment of a "permanent War/Peace Research Agency" tasked, in part, with better rationalizing war to better address its non-military functions and developing a "quantification of existing application of the non-military functions of war."

== Reception ==
When The Report from Iron Mountain was first published, some readers questioned whether it was a work of fiction or an actual report. In its November 20, 1967 issue, U.S. News & World Report claimed to have confirmation of the reality of the report. An unnamed government official added that when President Johnson read the report, he 'hit the roof' and ordered it to be suppressed. Sources were alleged to have revealed that orders were sent to U.S. embassies, instructing them to emphasize that the book had no relation to U.S. Government policy.

On November 26, 1967, The Washington Post published a book review by Herschel McLandress, the pen name for Harvard professor John Kenneth Galbraith, in which McLandress claimed firsthand knowledge of the report's authenticity. He stated that he had been invited to help write the report, and although he was unable to participate in the official group, he was consulted from time to time and was asked to keep the project secret. He said that he doubted the wisdom of letting the public know about the report but agreed with its conclusions. Six weeks later, in an Associated Press dispatch from London, Galbraith went even further and jokingly admitted that he was a member of the conspiracy. However, the following day, Galbraith backed off of his initial claims. When asked about his 'conspiracy' statement, he replied, "For the first time since Charles II, The Times has been guilty of a misquotation... Nothing shakes my conviction that it was written by either Dean Rusk or Mrs. Clare Boothe Luce." The original reporter reported the following six days later: "Misquoting seems to be a hazard to which Professor Galbraith is prone. The latest edition of the Cambridge newspaper Varsity quotes the following (tape-recorded) interchange: Interviewer: 'Are you aware of the identity of the author of Report from Iron Mountain?' Galbraith: 'I was in general a member of the conspiracy, but I was not the author. I have always assumed that it was the man who wrote the foreword – Mr. Lewin'."

In an article in the March 19, 1972, edition of The New York Times Book Review, Lewin said that he had written the book. The book was listed in the Guinness Book of World Records as the "Most Successful Literary Hoax." Some people claim that the book is genuine and has only been called a hoax as a means of damage control. Trans-Action devoted an issue to the debate over the book. Esquire magazine published a 28,000-word excerpt. In an article published in New York in 2013, Victor Navasky confirmed that Galbraith was indeed McLandress and that he was "in on the hoax from the beginning."

Some conspiracy theorists reject the statement made in 1972 by the author that the book was satire and that he was its author.

In a remembrance of E. L. Doctorow published in 2015 in The Nation, Victor Navasky asserted his involvement in creating Report from Iron Mountain, naming Leonard Lewin as the main writer with "input" from economist John Kenneth Galbraith, two editors of the satirical magazine Monocle (Marvin Kitman and Richard Lingeman), and himself.

== See also ==
- Continuity of Operations
- Military-industrial complex
- Military Keynesianism
- War economy
