= Nicholas Grabowsky =

American novelist

- Born: Nicholas John Grabowsky; May 7, 1966 (age 60)
- Occupations: Author; screenwriter
- Writing career
- Genres: Horror fiction; fantasy
- Website: www.downwarden.com

Nicholas John Grabowsky (born May 7, 1966) is an American horror/fantasy author and screenwriter.

== Writing career ==
After working as an extra in Hollywood for such films as Masters of the Universe and Night of the Creeps, and pursuing a modelling career, Grabowsky became the acting coach to Walter Koenig, who introduced Nicholas to a New York publisher of mass market paperback novels. His first novel, Pray Serpent's Prey, a Christian allegory of vampires invading a small Montana town which Grabowsky began writing in high school, was accepted and published by Critic's Choice Paperbacks/Lorevan Publishing under the pseudonym Nicholas Randers. Grabowsky published subsequent works under the Randers name, including The Rag Man and Tale of the Makeshift Faire before 1990. He published romance novels and self-help books under the name Marsena Shane, including Sweet Dreams Lady Moon, The Easy Way to Great Legs, Your Heart Belongs to You and June Park until 1991, when he left his pseudonyms. He also wrote a commissioned sequel to Wes Craven's Shocker, which was never produced. In 1988, he wrote the novelization of Halloween 4, which was published under his real name and became a bestseller.

In 2001, Grabowsky completed his novel The Everborn, which won the award for Science Fiction Novel of the Year (2004) from the American Author's Association. In 2002, he established the small press of Diverse Media, which published a limited edition of his Halloween 4 novelization, followed by Diverse Tales, The Wicked Haze, the children's book Flatty Kat: Tales of an Urban Feline with Phyllis Haupert, and Nick Reads & Reviews. In 2008, he established the small traditional publishing house of Black Bed Sheet Books, which publishes authors mainly in the horror/fantasy category, and Black Bed Sheet Productions, which produces independent feature films. In 2008, he co-wrote the screenplay for Into the Basement with Norm Applegate, based on Applegate's book, for Triad Pictures, scheduled for release in 2009.

Grabowsky's work has also been published in comic form. In 2010 Shot In the Dark Comics, an independent comic book company, acquired the rights to release a set of comics taken from his book Red Wet Dirt. Looks like A Rat To Me was released in August 2010. The follow-up graphic novel The Father Keeper will be released in 2011.

== Bibliography ==
=== Novels ===
- (1988) Pray, Serpent's Prey (Nicholas Randers)
- (1988) Halloween IV
- (1988) Sweet Dreams, Lady Moon (Marsena Shane)
- (1989) The Rag Man (AKA Tattered) (Nicholas Randers)
- (1989) June Park (Marsena Shane)
- (1990) Tale of the Makeshift Faire (Nicholas Randers)
- (2002) The Everborn
- (2002) Halloween IV: The Special Limited Edition
- (2005) The Wicked Haze

=== Collections ===
- (2006) Diverse Tales
- (2008) Red Wet Dirt

=== Nonfiction ===
- (1988) The Easy Way to Great Legs (Marsena Shane)
- (1988) Nancy (a biography of the First Lady) (Marsena Shane)
- (1989) Your Heart Belongs to You (Marsena Shane)
- (2008) Nick Reads & Reviews

=== Anthologies and other publications ===
- (2005) Embark to Madness (introduction)
- (2005) War of the Worlds (introduction)
- (2005) The Invisible Man (introduction)
- (2006) Buck Alice & the Actor-robot (editor, by author Walter Koenig)
- (2006) Fear: An Anthology of Horror & Suspense (introduction)
- (2007) Shocking Tales of Murder & Insanity (editor, by Jake Istre)
- (2007) Echoes of Terror (short story, "Looks Like a Rat to Me")
- (2007) Doorways Magazine (issue #4, short story, "The Yuletide Thing")
- (2008) You're Dead Already...Living in Hell (editor, by Jake Istre)
- (2008) From the Shadows (short story, "The Freeway Reaper")

=== Children's ===
- (2006) Flatty Kat: Tales of an Urban Feline (with Phyllis Haupert)

=== Comics ===
- (2010) Looks Like A Rat To Me (Shot In The Dark Comics)
- (2011) The Father Keeper (graphic novel) (Shot In The Dark Comics)
