= Will Hubbell =

American author and illustrator

Will Hubbell is an American author and illustrator. He began as an author and illustrator of children's picture books. Subsequently, he authored science fiction. More recently, he has authored fantasy novels under the pen name of Morgan Howell.

== Works ==
- Children's books
  - Pumpkin Jack (2000) (Whitman, Albert & Company ISBN 978-0-8075-6666-4)
  - Apples Here! (2002) (Whitman, Albert & Company ISBN 978-0-8075-0397-3)
  - Snow Day Dance (2005) (Whitman, Albert & Company ISBN 978-0-8075-7523-9)
- Science fiction
  - Cretaceous Sea (2002) (Ace Publishers, ISBN 978-0-441-00989-3)
  - Sea of Time (2004) (Ace Publishers, ISBN 978-0-441-01143-8)
- Fantasy (under the pen name, Morgan Howell)
  - Queen of the Orcs, Trilogy
    - King's Property (2007) (Del Rey, ISBN 978-0-345-49650-8)
    - Clan Daughter (2007) (Del Rey, ISBN 978-0-345-49651-5)
    - Royal Destiny (2007) (Del Rey, ISBN 978-0-345-49652-2)
  - The Shadowed Path, Trilogy
    - A Woman Worth Ten Coppers (2008) (Del Rey, ISBN 978-0-345-50396-1)
    - Candle in the Storm (2009) (Del Rey, ISBN 978-0-345-50397-8)
    - The Iron Palace (2010) (Del Rey, ISBN 978-0-345-50398-5)
