= Halloween 4: The Return of Michael Myers =

1988 film by Dwight H. Little

- Theatrical release poster
- Directed by: Dwight H. Little
- Screenplay by: Alan B. McElroy
- Story by: Danny Lipsius; Larry Rattner; Benjamin Ruffner; Alan B. McElroy
- Based on: Characters by: John Carpenter; Debra Hill
- Produced by: Paul Freeman
- Starring: Donald Pleasence; Ellie Cornell; Danielle Harris; Michael Pataki
- Cinematography: Peter Lyons Collister
- Edited by: Curtiss Clayton
- Music by: Alan Howarth
- Production company: Trancas International
- Distributed by: Galaxy International Releasing
- Release date: October 21, 1988
- Running time: 88 minutes
- Country: United States
- Language: English
- Budget: $5 million
- Box office: $17 million

Halloween 4: The Return of Michael Myers is a 1988 American slasher film directed by Dwight H. Little, written by Alan B. McElroy, and starring Donald Pleasence, Ellie Cornell, Danielle Harris in her film debut, and Michael Pataki. It is the fourth installment in the Halloween franchise and a sequel to Halloween II (1981). The film marks the return of Michael Myers as the primary antagonist following his absence in Halloween III: Season of the Witch (1982), and focuses on his escape from years of comatose incarceration while being transported from a maximum security institution and carves his way to Haddonfield to kill his young niece, Jamie Lloyd, a decade after his first killing spree.

Initially, John Carpenter and co-producer Debra Hill intended to create an anthology series with only the first two films being connected, but after the poor reception of Halloween III, the idea was abandoned. Screenwriter McElroy was hired to rework Dennis Etchison's original screenplay, reintroducing Michael Myers. Principal photography of Halloween 4 took place on location in Salt Lake City, Utah in the spring of 1988.

Halloween 4 was released in the United States on October 21, 1988. Despite mostly negative reviews from critics, the film grossed $17.8 million domestically on a budget of $5 million. It has developed a strong cult following since its release and has enjoyed positive reappraisals in the years since its release.

The film begins the Thorn Trilogy story arc which would be continued in Halloween 5: The Revenge of Michael Myers (1989) and Halloween: The Curse of Michael Myers (1995).

== Plot ==
On October 30, 1988, Michael Myers, who has been comatose for ten years since the explosion at Haddonfield Memorial Hospital, (Note: As depicted in Halloween II (1981)) is being transferred from Ridgemont Federal Sanitarium to Smith's Grove Sanitarium. During the transfer, when Michael overhears that he has a niece living in Haddonfield, he awakens, kills the ambulance personnel and heads back to his hometown to kill her.

In Haddonfield, Laurie Strode's orphaned daughter Jamie Lloyd suffers from nightmares about The Shape and is bullied at school for being the niece of "the boogeyman". On Halloween night, her foster parents Richard and Darlene Carruthers plan to go to a business meeting and leave their teenage daughter Rachel to babysit, forcing her to cancel a date with her boyfriend Brady. Rachel makes plans to take Jamie trick-or-treating, but she declines and they instead settle on buying ice cream after school.

Back at Ridgemont, a now aged and scarred Dr. Loomis, who also survived the explosion, learns of Michael's escape and gives chase back to Haddonfield once again. While driving to Haddonfield, Loomis stops at a gas station and diner, where Michael has killed a mechanic for his coveralls, along with a female clerk. After Loomis discovers and fails to negotiate with Michael, a gunfight erupts and Michael escapes in a tow truck, igniting the gas pumps causing an explosion, destroying Loomis's car given by Ridgemont in the process and disabling the phone lines. Loomis continues to pursue Michael on foot.

Rachel and her friend Lindsey pick Jamie up after school where Jamie changes her mind and decides to go trick-or-treating that night. Jamie decides on a clown costume when Michael suddenly appears to steal a new mask. He goes after his niece but flees when she screams in horror. Meanwhile, Loomis hitches a ride with an eccentric priest named Reverend Jackson P. Sayer in a Dodge B series pickup truck.

That night, as Rachel and Jamie are trick-or-treating, Michael breaks into the Carruthers' house, kills the family dog, and finds out Jamie's identity after finding several photos of Laurie in the house. Loomis arrives in Haddonfield and warns the new sheriff, Ben Meeker, that Michael has returned. They immediately go out to search for the girls. At a power plant, Michael throws the utility worker into the transformer, causing an entire power outage in the area. He proceeds to kill most of the town's police force, prompting the locals to form a lynch mob.

Meeker and Loomis find Rachel and Jamie and take them to the sheriff's house, where Brady is having an affair with Meeker's daughter Kelly. They barricade the premises as Deputy Logan arrives and Loomis departs to find Michael, who has already snuck into the house. While searching for Michael, the lynch mob accidentally shoots and kills an innocent civilian. After Meeker leaves to respond to the shooting, Michael kills Deputy Logan, Kelly, and Brady as Rachel and Jamie flee to the attic and onto the roof while Michael steals a kitchen knife in the attic. Rachel lowers Jamie down to safety but is attacked by Michael, falling to the ground and losing consciousness.

Pursued by Michael, Jamie runs down the street and runs into Loomis. They seek shelter at the school, but Michael finds them and tosses Loomis through a glass door. He chases Jamie throughout the school, until she falls down a flight of stairs. Michael prepares to kill her when Rachel reappears and subdues him with a fire extinguisher. The lynch mob arrives and agrees to help the girls get out of Haddonfield. Along the way they meet a lone trooper who tells them there is a substation up the road where they will be safe. Michael, who has been hidden underneath their truck the whole time, climbs aboard and kills the men, including Earl. Rachel takes the wheel, throws Michael off the truck, and rams into him. Meeker and Loomis arrive with the rest of the lynch mob and the state police, while Jamie approaches her uncle and touches his hand. As he rises, Meeker and the others shoot him until he falls down an abandoned mine.

Back at the Carruthers' house, Darlene goes upstairs to run a bath for Jamie when she is suddenly attacked. Loomis hears her cries and sees Jamie, now silent and emotionless, in her clown costume holding a pair of bloody scissors, reminiscent of when Michael killed his older sister. (Note: As depicted in Halloween (1978)) Loomis screams in despair and raises his gun to shoot Jamie, but is disarmed by Meeker. Rachel, Richard, and Meeker look on in horror as Loomis sobs, realizing that the evil inside of Michael has infected Jamie.

== Cast ==
- Donald Pleasence as Dr. Sam Loomis
- Ellie Cornell as Rachel Carruthers
- Danielle Harris as Jamie Lloyd
- Tom Morga and George P. Wilbur as Michael Myers
- Michael Pataki as Dr. Hoffman
- Beau Starr as Sheriff Ben Meeker
- Kathleen Kinmont as Kelly Meeker
- Sasha Jenson as Brady
- Leslie L. Rohland as Lindsey
- Gene Ross as Earl Ford
- Carmen Filpi as Reverend Jackson P. Sayer
- Raymond O'Connor as Security Guard
- Jeff Olson as Richard Carruthers
- Karen Alston as Darlene Carruthers
- Nancy Borgenicht as Woman Attendant
- David Jansen as Man Attendant
- George Sullivan as Deputy Logan
- Michael Ruud as Alan "Big Al" Gateway
- Eric Hart as Orrin Gateway
- Logan Field as Unger (as Walt Logan Field)
- Alan B. McElroy as State Trooper at Ambulance Crash Site (uncredited)
- Danny Ray as Tommy Doyle

== Production ==
=== Development ===
Halloween was banned in Haddonfield and I think that the basic idea was that if you tried to suppress something, it would only rear its head more strongly. By the very [attempt] of trying to erase the memory of Michael Myers, [the teenagers] were going to ironically bring him back into existence.

— Dennis Etchison on his idea for Halloween 4

Plans for a fourth Halloween film were reported as early as December 1982, shortly after the release of Halloween III: Season of the Witch. Producer Irwin Yablans announced that Halloween IV was in development, although no distributor had yet been secured, and stated that Dino De Laurentiis held first refusal on the project. John Carpenter and Debra Hill were also initially expected to return as producers, along with Moustapha Akkad, though Yablans, Carpenter and Hill ultimately did not participate in the completed film.

After Halloween III: Season of the Witch, executive producer Moustapha Akkad wanted to move further with the series, and bring back Michael Myers. Producer Paul Freeman, a friend of Akkad with a long list of credits to his name, explained to Fangoria magazine in 1988 that everybody came out of Halloween III saying, "Where's Michael?" John Carpenter was approached by Cannon Films, who had just finished 1986's release of The Texas Chainsaw Massacre 2, to write and direct Halloween 4. Debra Hill planned to produce the film, while Carpenter teamed up with Dennis Etchison who, under the pseudonym Jack Martin, had written novelizations of both Halloween II (1981) and Halloween III: Season of the Witch (1982) to write a script to Halloween 4. Originally, Joe Dante was Carpenter's choice in mind of director for the project.

However, Akkad rejected the Etchison script, calling it "too cerebral" and insisting that any new Halloween sequel must feature Myers as a flesh and blood killer. In an interview, Etchison explained how he received the phone call informing him of the rejection of his script. Etchison said, "I received a call from Debra Hill and she said, 'Dennis, I just wanted you to know that John and I have sold our interest in the title 'Halloween' and unfortunately, your script was not part of the deal."

Carpenter and Hill had signed all of their rights away to Akkad, who gained ownership. Akkad said, "I just went back to the basics of Halloween on Halloween 4 and it was the most successful." As Carpenter refused to continue his involvement with the series, a new director was sought out. Dwight H. Little, a native of Ohio, replaced Carpenter. Little had previously directed episodes for Freddy's Nightmares and the film Getting Even.

=== Screenplay ===
On February 25, 1988, writer Alan B. McElroy, a native of Cleveland, Ohio, was brought in to write the script for Halloween 4. The writer's strike was to begin on March 7 that year. This forced McElroy to develop a concept, pitch the story, and send in the final draft in under eleven days. McElroy came up with the idea of Brittany "Britti" Lloyd, Laurie Strode's daughter, to be chased by her uncle, who has escaped from Ridgemont after being in a coma for ten years. Dr. Samuel Loomis goes looking for Michael with Sheriff Meeker. The setting of the place was once again Haddonfield, Illinois. The character of Laurie Strode was revealed to have died, leaving Britti with the Carruthers family, which included Rachel, the family's seventeen-year-old daughter. Britti's name was later changed to Jamie, a homage to Laurie Strode actress Jamie Lee Curtis.

McElroy told Fangoria:

When I first saw the original, I was dating a girl and took her to a theater in Boston to see it. We were the only ones in the place, but she was climbing all over me. When Halloween II came out, I got completely blitzed and saw it, and I had the best time. So when the director, Dwight Little, asked me to write the script, I jumped at the chance. Here I was going to bring the Shape — Michael Myers — back to life. It's a piece of film history. He's truly an icon.

In the original draft, Sheriff Ben Meeker was to be killed during the Shape's attack on the Meeker house, during which a fire started in the basement and burnt down the entire house. The scene on top of the roof with the Shape, Rachel, and Jamie was supposed to be engulfed in flames, but this idea was scrapped due to budget issues. Instead, a more "soap opera" feel was incorporated, which included a love triangle subplot between Rachel, Brady, and Kelly Meeker, the sheriff's daughter.

Director Dwight H. Little stated in 2006 that his interpretation of McElroy's screenplay had the Michael Myers character played as a literal escaped mental patient, not a supernatural figure. Little approached the screenplay as though Myers was pursuing Jamie as a means of "connecting with her", but that he had no social capacity to interact with her, and thus resorted to violence. The screenplay references the events of Halloween II (1981), in which a fire breaks out in Haddonfield Hospital, by having both Myers and Loomis display burn scars on their respective hands and faces.

=== Casting ===
The cast of Halloween 4 included only one actor from the first two films, Donald Pleasence, who reprised his role as Samuel Loomis, Michael Myers' psychiatrist. According to Little, Pleasence was "committed conceptually" to the role, but did not sign on to the project until having read a finished screenplay. Before McElroy's script was chosen, the producers asked Jamie Lee Curtis, another original cast member, to reprise her role as Laurie Strode, the original's heroine. Curtis had become a success in the film industry and had established a career with her roles in films like Trading Places (1983) and A Fish Called Wanda (1988). Curtis declined and did not want to continue her participation in the film, although she did return for the seventh Halloween film. As a result, her character was written out and died, which is briefly explained in the film.

The script introduced Laurie Strode's seven-year-old daughter, Jamie Lloyd. Melissa Joan Hart had auditioned for the role, among various other girls. Danielle Harris, who previously had a reoccurring role on the ABC daytime soap opera, One Life to Live (as Samantha Garretson) was ultimately cast in the role after auditioning in New York. Director Dwight H. Little recalled that Harris was around the tenth actress to audition for the part, and that he "knew when she walked into the room, before she even spoke, that she was the one."

Rebecca Schaeffer had auditioned for the role of Rachel Carruthers, but had to drop out due to scheduling conflicts. Twenty-three-year-old Ellie Cornell had also auditioned. Cornell had chosen to audition for Halloween 4 and A Nightmare on Elm Street 4: The Dream Master (1988) as the role of Kristen Parker. Cornell chose Halloween 4 and successfully landed the role of Rachel following a screen test. Beau Starr was cast as the new Sheriff, Ben Meeker, replacing Sheriff Lee Brackett (Charles Cyphers), and Kathleen Kinmont was cast as the Sheriff's daughter, Kelly. George P. Wilbur was cast to play Michael Myers.

=== Filming ===
Principal photography began on April 11, 1988. Instead of filming in Pasadena, California (the original filming location and stand in for Haddonfield) due to high-rising costs, filming took place in and around Salt Lake City, Utah. As filming was taking place in March, during springtime, the producers were forced to import leaves and big squash, which they would use to create pumpkins by painting them orange. "One of the obvious challenges in making a part four of anything is to interest a contemporary audience in old characters and themes," said director Little. "What I'm trying to do is capture the mood of the original Halloween and yet take a lot of new chances. What we're attempting to do is walk a fine line between horror and mystery. Halloween 4 will not be an ax-in-the-forehead kind of movie." Paul Freeman agreed. "This film does contain some humorous moments, but it's not of the spoof or send-up variety. It's humor that rises out of the film's situations and quickly turns back into terror."

George P. Wilbur, who was cast as Michael Myers, wore hockey pads under the costume to make himself look more physically imposing, and he was often filmed in mirror reflections or off-center so that the audience could witness him "in pieces" rather than have an encompassing view. During filming, the cast and crew made it a point to take it easy on Danielle Harris, as she was only a young child at the time, and made sure that she was not scared too badly and knew that none of it was real; to this end, Wilbur regularly removed the mask in front of her in order to remind her that it was just a movie and he was not going to hurt her.

The late night scenes caused issues with the cast. Garlan Wilde, a gaffer for the film, was injured during the scene between Brady and the Shape when he dropped a light and accidentally slit his wrists. He was rushed to the hospital. In addition, while filming the rooftop scene, Ellie Cornell cut her stomach open on a large nail while sliding down the roof, though she continued filming the scene despite losing a sizable amount of blood. During most of the night scenes, Donald Pleasence became so cold that he wore a hat, unbeknownst to the crew. This caused over six hours of footage to be re-shot. The shoot lasted approximately 35 days by Little's recollection.

During filming, the customized 1975 Captain Kirk mask was unavailable and a new one was purchased from a local costume shop. The producers wanted to test what it would look like without the edits. The school scene was filmed and when reviewing the producers did not like how the mask turned out. It was allegedly customized again but did not live up to the original, and the producers felt it was too old and went for a new mask. Some scenes had to be re-shot with the new mask. The only scene left in is when Loomis is thrown through a glass door; as Michael comes up behind him, the unaltered face and blonde hair is visible. Director Dwight H. Little thought the use of the blond mask stemmed from a tired crew member grabbing an incorrect mask from the prop area. Though nobody on set caught the error, it was acknowledged in the later stages of production. Little confirmed the mistake was left in the film and would have been fixed if his team had more time.

=== Post-production ===
Following a screening of the film's rough cut at the Thalberg Building on the Metro-Goldwyn-Mayer studio lot, director Dwight H. Little and producer Moustapha Akkad decided that the film's violence was too soft, after which an additional day was spent filming bloody special effects, particularly involving the film's climactic sequence. Special effects make-up artist John Carl Buechler (director of Friday the 13th Part VII: The New Blood) was hired to create several effects for murder sequences seen in the final cut of the film.

=== Music ===
The score was performed by Alan Howarth, who had assisted John Carpenter on Halloween II and Halloween III. Howarth gained approval from Dwight H. Little before he could accept the offer, creating a new score that referenced the original's but with a synthesizer twist. Howarth also included new tracks such as "Jamie's Nightmare", "Return of the Shape", and "Police Station". The soundtrack was released to CD, vinyl, and cassette tape on September 28, 1988.

== Release ==
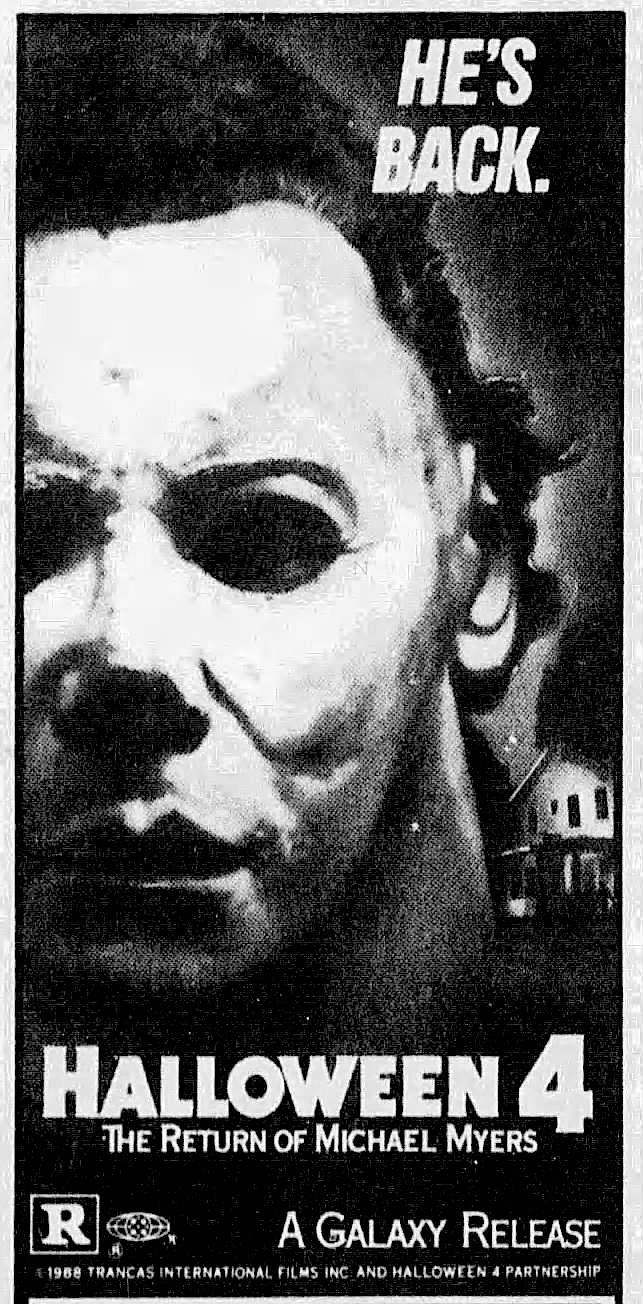
Newspaper advertisement for the film in The Sacramento Bee, October 1988

The film's world-premiere screening was held on October 17, 1988, as a benefit for the Actors Fund, four days before its commercial release.

Halloween 4 opened in 1,679 theaters in the United States on October 21, 1988, through Galaxy Releasing Corporation. It was released through 20th Century Fox in the United Kingdom the following year, on November 3, 1989.

=== Home media ===
The film was first released on VHS on May 18, 1989, by CBS/Fox Video. Anchor Bay Entertainment released the film on VHS and DVD in October 2000. In 2006, Anchor Bay re-released the film in a special edition DVD. The film was released on Blu-ray for the first time in Germany on May 4, 2012, and in the U.S. on August 21, 2012, by Anchor Bay.

Scream Factory released the film as part of a multi-film Halloween Blu-ray box set on September 23, 2014, followed by a 4K UHD Blu-ray on October 5, 2021. The release featured a new 4K scan of the original camera negative and a new Dolby Atmos audio track.

== Reception ==
=== Box office ===
Halloween 4 was a box-office hit in the United States. The film grossed $6,831,250 during its opening weekend, ranking number one at the box office. Galaxy initially estimated the opening weekend gross at $7,215,000, citing computer problems at AMC Theatres for the estimate, however, other distributors felt this was overstated by $500,000. Galaxy later revised their figure downwards by $400,000. It held the top spot in its second weekend. The total gross in the United States and Canada was $17,768,757 with approximately 4.3 million tickets sold during its initial theatrical run.

=== Critical response ===
==== Contemporary ====
The film garnered an "overwhelmingly unfavorable" critical reception upon release. On the review aggregator website Rotten Tomatoes, 43% of 35 critics' reviews are positive. The website's consensus reads: "Halloween 4: The Return Of Michael Myers may bring the series' masked killer back into the fold, but fails to offer the visceral scares and inventiveness of the original." Metacritic, which uses a weighted average, assigned the film a score of 34 out of 100, based on 100 critics, indicating "generally unfavorable" reviews.

Caryn James of The New York Times criticized the film for abandoning the original film's strengths saying "suspense and psychological horror have given way to superhuman strength and resilience." Michael Wilmington of the Los Angeles Times panned the film, writing: "Anyone who goes to see Halloween 4 deserves what they get: stale, sordid tricks and no treats." Variety found the film to be "a no-frills, workmanlike picture."

Richard Harrington of The Washington Post declared the film "very much the cheap knockoff of its prototype, but not half as visceral." Writing for The Boston Globe, critic Betsy Sherman expressed extreme dislike for the film, writing: "The most intriguing thing about this musty corpse of a movie is how four people got credit for the mass of cliches that passes for a 'story'." Malcolm L. Johnson of the Hartford Courant awarded the film a one out of four star-rating, criticizing it for being "fairly predictable albeit modestly scary" until its "fairly chilling twist." Stephen Hunter of The Baltimore Sun found the film's premise distasteful, noting: "The central motif is a lumbering killer trying to ace a little girl, and whacking everybody who comes in between," adding that it lends the film an "unappetizing aroma even more putrid than the average teen slasher."

Ted Mahar of The Oregonian gave the film a rare favorable review, praising Harris's "affecting" performance and summarizing the film as "a bloody faithful sequel." The Des Moines Register, despite describing the film as poorly-made, also assessed Harris's acting as convincing, noting: "Danielle registers terror so persuasively one can only suspect she was primed for it the way Hollywood legend has it that Margaret O'Brien and Jackie Cooper were put into the mood for emotional scenes in their movies." The Houston Post's Tim Carman gave the film a mixed assessment, describing its story as predictable despite noting some positive attributes to McElroy's screenplay, as well as its "mood-setting scenes and its generally above-average acting."

==== Retrospective ====
In the years following its release, the film has received some positive retrospective reception, with several critics praising it for its strong autumnal atmosphere and slasher elements. Tyler Geis of MovieWeb commented on the film's atmosphere, saying, "The farm fields, the gloominess, and the old, worn-out Halloween decorations mixed with the ominous music that plays over the [opening] shots set the tone for the movie and the return of its antagonist. There's progression in the shots, as the first few look like afternoon settings, but then the sun starts to dwindle more and more as they go on. Thus setting up the film's opening scene of the Michael Myers transport gone bad... Halloween 4's fall feel bleeds into the rest of the movie."

John Fallon of JoBlo.com praised the film in a retrospective review, noting: "The movie is tight, has good murders and a kicked my butt ending. The Shape is back and in good form; this is my favorite Halloween next to the first one." Eric Goldman of IGN declared "Halloween 4: The Return of Michael Myers stands out as the second best film in the entire series." In 2017, Davey Conner (now attributed to Alan Smithee as of 2023) writing for Dread Central said, "Halloween 4 is a strong sequel, horror film and Halloween movie." DVD Talk's Adam Tyner wrote: "Despite its flaws, Halloween 4 is one of the best slashers from the late 1980s, standing out in an era when the sub genre was in steep decline."

In 2000, Kim Newman, writing for Empire, offered an unfavorable assessment: "It's incredible that a film could be so closely patterned on Carpenter's still-thrilling original movie and yet be so stupid, unscary and plodding as Halloween 4 is."

In retrospect, director Dwight Little said:

That's another movie that was not received very well. It did well commercially, but the critic response was not great. I don't know what the expectations were with Michael Myers. There's an initial resistance to that movie, but later over the years, there have been several reissues on DVD and Blu-ray, and so forth. And of course, it plays every year, and I think people really love it now.

=== Accolades ===
Institution	Year	Category	Recipient	Result	Ref.
Saturn Awards	1990	Best Horror Film	Halloween 4: The Return of Michael Myers	Nominated	
Saturn Awards	1990	Best Writing	Alan B. McElroy	Nominated	
Saturn Awards	2015	Best DVD or Blu-ray Collection	Halloween 4: The Return of Michael Myers	Won (Note: As part of the Halloween: The Complete Collection Blu-ray box set by Shout! Factory.)	

== Legacy ==
The film has been credited with helping re-establish Michael Myers as the central figure of the Halloween franchise following his absence from Halloween III: Season of the Witch. In 2020, producer Malek Akkad said that his father, Moustapha Akkad, had insisted on bringing Myers back despite the character's apparent death in Halloween II, and argued that the subsequent continuation of the franchise would not have occurred without that decision.

For the film's 30th anniversary in 2018, Universal Studios created haunted attractions based specifically on Halloween 4 for Universal's Halloween Horror Nights at both Universal Studios Florida and Universal Studios Hollywood. The attractions recreated Michael Myers's return to Haddonfield and scenes from the film.

== Novelization ==
To tie in with the film's release, a novelization by Nicholas Grabowsky was published, containing 224 pages. The novel closely follows the film's events, with a few alterations. In 2003, the novel was re-issued with new material and cover art, titled Halloween IV: The Special Limited Edition. In 2013, a hardcover version was released, titled Halloween IV: The Ultimate Authorized Edition which includes a never-before-published epilogue that changes the original ending.

== See also ==
- List of films set around Halloween

== Sources ==
- Craddock, James M. (2006). Video Source Book: Video Program Listings A-I (36th ed.). Detroit, Michigan: Thomson Gale. ISBN 978-0-787-68977-3.
- Harris, Danielle; Cornell, Ellie (2006). Halloween 4: The Return of Michael Myers (DVD audio commentary). Anchor Bay Entertainment. OCLC 70847822.
- Little, Dwight H. (2006). Halloween 4: The Return of Michael Myers (DVD audio commentary). Anchor Bay Entertainment. OCLC 70847822.
- Little, Dwight H. (2023). Still Rolling: Inside the Hollywood Dream Factory. Jefferson, North Carolina: McFarland & Company. ISBN 978-1-476-64956-6.
- Spiegel, Josh (2023). Timelines of Terror: The Fractured Continuities of Horror Film Sequels. Jefferson, North Carolina: McFarland & Company. ISBN 978-1-476-64923-8.
- Stine, Scott Aaron (2003). The Gorehound's Guide to Splatter Films of the 1980s. Jefferson, North Carolina: McFarland & Company. ISBN 978-0-786-41532-8.
