= Lesley Bannatyne =

American author

Lesley Pratt Bannatyne is an American author who writes extensively on Halloween, especially its history, literature, and contemporary celebration. She is also a writer of fiction; her debut collection of short stories, Unaccustomed to Grace, was published by Kallisto Gaia Press in 2022, and she received the 2024 Grace Paley Prize for Lake Song, published by Mad Creek Books/OSU Press in 2025. She contributed the World Book Encyclopedia entry for Halloween and appears as a commentator on the annual October screening of “Haunted History of Halloween” on the History Channel. Bannatyne is also a freelance journalist who's covered stories ranging from druids in Somerville, Massachusetts to relief workers in Bolivia. She graduated Phi Beta Kappa from Wheaton College in Massachusetts with a degree in English. Her Master's is in Creative Writing and Literature from Harvard University Extension Studies.

Bannatyne's Halloween. An American Holiday, An American History was published in 1990 and, "ushered in a new era of scholarly interest in Halloween." Quoted as "A foremost authority on Halloween" by Charles F. Rosenay in his review of her latest book "Halloween Nation", Lesley has written five books on Halloween ranging from a children's book, Witches Night Before Halloween, to her latest Halloween Nation which shows the holiday through the eyes of its celebrants. The book was nominated for a 2011 Bram Stoker Award.

== Published works ==
- Lake Song. A Novel in Stories (2025, Mad Creek Books/OSU Press)
- Unaccustomed to Grace. Stories (2022, Kallisto Gaia Press)
- Halloween Nation. Behind the Scenes of America's Fright Night (2011, Pelican Publishing Company)
- Halloween. An American Holiday, An American History (1990, Facts on File; 1998 Pelican)
- A Halloween How To. Costumes, Parties, Decorations, and Destinations (2001, Pelican)
- A Halloween Reader. Stories, Poems, and Plays from Halloweens Past (2004, Pelican)
- Witches’ Night Before Halloween (for children) (2007, Pelican)
