= Margery Cuyler =

American children's book author

Margery Cuyler is an American children's book author. She has written many picture books, including That's Good! That's Bad! and the rest of its series.

Born on 31 December 1948 in Princeton NJ. Cuyler grew up in Princeton, NJ. She graduated from Sarah Lawrence College in 1970. Besides writing her own books, she has worked as a children's book editor and in executive positions at Amazon.com, Marshall Cavendish, Golden Books Family Entertainment, Henry Holt and Company, and Holiday House. In 2011, she appeared on The Celebrity Apprentice television show, judging the contestants on their work creating a children's book.

Cuyler lives in Lawrenceville, New Jersey.

== Bibliography ==
=== Picture books ===
- Sir William and the Pumpkin Monster, Henry Holt, 1984
- Freckles and Willie: A Valentine's Day Story, Henry Holt, 1986
- Fat Santa, Henry Holt, 1987
- Freckles and Jane, Henry Holt, 1989
- Shadow's Baby, Clarion Books, 1989
- Daisy's Crazy Thanksgiving, Henry Holt, 1990
- Baby Dot: A Dinosaur Story, Clarion Books, 1990
- Buddy Bear and the Bad Guys, Clarion Books, 1990
- That's Good! That's Bad!, Henry Holt, 1991
- The Christmas Snowman, Arcade Books, 1992
- The Biggest, Best Snowman, Scholastic, 1998
- From Here to There, Henry Holt, 1999
- 100th Day Worries, Simon & Schuster, 2000
- Road Signs, Winslow Press, 2000
- Stop, Drop and Roll, Simon & Schuster, 2001
- Ah-choo!, Scholastic, 2002
- That's Good! That's Bad! In the Grand Canyon, Henry Holt, 2002
- Skeleton Hiccups, Margaret K. McElderry, 2002
- Big Friends, Walker and Company, 2004
- Please Say Please! Penguin's Guide to Manners, Scholastic, 2004
- Groundhog Stays Up Late, Walker/Bloomsbury, 2005
- The Bumpy Little Pumpkin, Scholastic, 2005
- Please Play Safe! Penguin's Guide to Playground Safety, Scholastic, 2006
- Kindness Is Cooler, Mrs. Ruler, Simon & Schuster, 2007
- That's Good! That's Bad! In Washington, D.C., Henry Holt, 2007
- Hooray for Reading Day!, Simon & Schuster, 2008
- Monster Mess, Margaret McElderry Books/Simon & Schuster, 2008
- We’re Going on a Lion Hunt, Marshall Cavendish, 2008
- The Little Dump Truck, Henry Holt, 2009
- That's Good! That's Bad! On Santa's Journey, Henry Holt, 2009
- Bullies Never Win, Simon & Schuster, 2009
- Princess Bess Gets Dressed, Simon & Schuster, 2009
- I Repeat, Don't Cheat!, Simon & Schuster, 2010
- Guinea Pigs Add Up, Walker and Company, 2010
- Tick Tock Clock, HarperCollins, 2012
- Skeleton for Dinner, Albert Whiteman, 2013
- The Little School Bus, Henry Holt, 2014
- The Little Dump Truck, Henry Holt, 2014
- Bonaparte Falls Apart, Crown Books, 2017

=== Novels ===
- The Trouble with Soap, E.P. Dutton, 1982
- Weird Wolf, Henry Holt, 1989
- Invisible in the Third Grade, Henry Holt, 1995
- The Battlefield Ghost, Scholastic, 1999

=== Nonfiction ===
- Jewish Holidays, Henry Holt, 1978
- The All-Around Pumpkin Book, Henry Holt, 1980
- The All-Around Christmas Book, Henry Holt, 1982
