= Ulrich Karger =

German writer (born 1957)

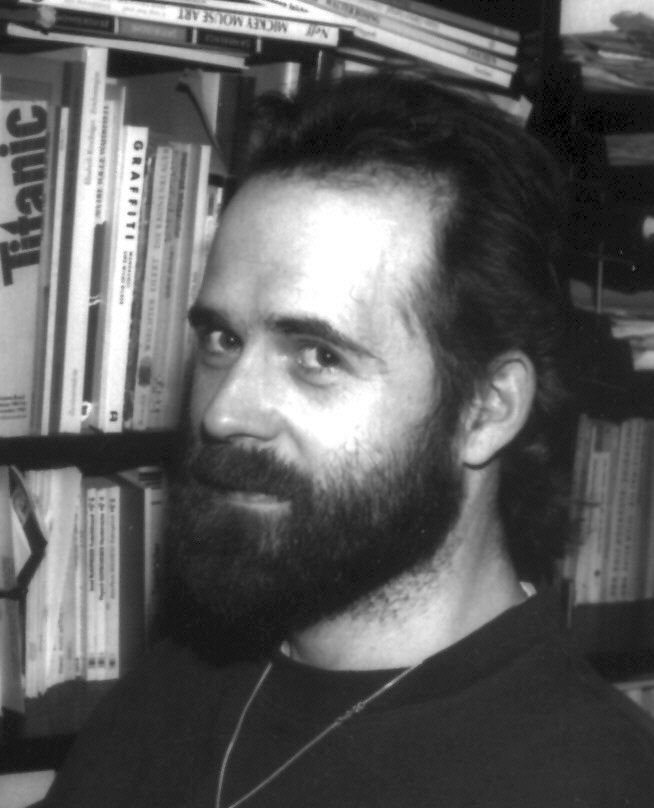
Ulrich Karger

Ulrich Karger (3 February 1957 in Berchtesgaden, Bavaria, Germany) is an author and teacher of religion at a school for speech disabled children in Berlin.

His publications are aimed at children and adults. The complete retelling of Homers Odyssey in prose form in a book for young people, which received acclaim from critics in the complete German linguistic area, is one of his most successful works. This work also forms the basis of the "piece of read-music" Odyssey 1-5-9 that Ulrich Karger developed together with the Berlin jazz-composer Gernot Reetz. Beside other several languages is his picture book for children Geisterstunde im Kindergarten being published in English as The Scary Sleepover.

In addition, for years he has been writing also many book reviews for various daily papers and magazines. He is a member of VS Berlin (writers' association within the German trade union ver.di). He established the freely accessible online review archives Buechernachlese in 2000. Under this have to be called over 1,500 of his book reviews and short indications for fiction and poetry, non-fiction book as well as children's books and literature for young people. In 2010 he founded the book label Edition Gegenwind, which is meanwhile also used by other well known German writers such as Gabriele Beyerlein, Thomas Fuchs, Manfred Schlüter and Christa Zeuch. Together they now belong to a community of authors, who under this book label above all republish out of stock books written by themselves.

== Bibliography ==
=== Poetry & Prose ===
- Zeitlese (poetry, texts & 14 vignettes) 1982
- Gemischte Gefühle (poetry and short prose) 1985, ISBN 3-925122-00-1
- Verquer (novel collage) 1990, ISBN 3-900959-02-1, paperback new edition 2013, ISBN 978-1-4849-6221-3 (E-Book: EAN/ISBN 978-3-8476-2601-5)
- Mitlesebuch Nr.26 (poetry and short prose) 1997
- KopfSteinPflasterEchos (grotesque stories) 1999, ISBN 3-932325-56-7, paperback new edition 2022, ISBN 978-3-347-50683-1
- Kindskopf – Eine Heimsuchung (novella on the Book of Jonah) 2002, ISBN 3-928832-12-3; paperback new edition 2012, ISBN 978-3-8448-1262-6, (E-Book: EAN/ISBN 978-3-8448-3165-8)
- Vom Uhrsprung und anderen Merkwürdigkeiten (fairy tales and parables) 2010, ISBN 978-3-8391-6942-1; paperback new edition 2015, ISBN 978-1-5008-6218-3, (E-Book: EAN/ISBN 978-3-7380-2263-6).
- Herr Wolf kam nie nach Berchtesgaden – Ein Gedankenspiel in Wort und Bild (satire & picture cycle Berchtesgadener Panoptikum by Peter Karger) 2012, ISBN 978-3-8482-1375-7, paperback new edition 2022, ISBN 978-3-347-57723-7

=== Children's Book ===
- Familie Habakuk und die Ordumok-Gesellschaft (children's book) 1993, ISBN 3-414-83534-7
- Dicke Luft in Halbundhalb (children's book) 1994, ISBN 3-414-83602-5, paperback new edition 2011, ISBN 978-3-8391-6460-0
- Homer: Die Odyssee (retelling) 1996, ISBN 3-429-01809-9; paperback new edition 2004, ISBN 3-12-262460-5; E-Book new edition 2015, EAN/ISBN 978-3-8476-2863-7.
- Geisterstunde im Kindergarten (picture book illustrated by Uli Waas) 2002, ISBN 3-314-01151-2

translated from the German
English by J. Alison James: The Scary Sleepover 2002, ISBN 0-7358-1712-X
Dutch by Sander Hendriks: Spoken in de speelzaal 2002, ISBN 90-5579-684-0
French by Anne Ruck-Sultan: Halloween à l'école 2002, ISBN 3-314-21536-3
Italian by Alessandra Valtieri: Halloween all'asilo 2002, ISBN 88-8203-504-2
Slovenian by Andreja Sabati-Suster: Ples duhov v otroškem vrtcu 2002, ISBN 86-7823-284-6

=== Non-fiction Books ===
- Büchernachlese – Rezensionen 1985-1989. Collection of reviews. E-book original edition 2019, EAN/ISBN 978-3-7485-8899-3

=== As editor ===
==== Children's books ====
- Bücherwurm trifft Leseratte – Geschichten, Bilder und Reime für Kinder. Authors: Gabriele Beyerlein, Thomas Fuchs, Ulrich Karger, Manfred Schlüter, Christa Zeuch. Illustrations: Manfred Schlüter. Paperback 2013, ISBN 978-3-7322-4393-8 (E-Book: EAN/ISBN 978-3-8423-5333-6).
- Bücherwurm trifft Leseratte 2 – Neue Geschichten und Gedichte für Kinder. Authors: Gabriele Beyerlein, Dagmar Chidolue, Thomas Fuchs, Uschi Flacke, Ulrich Karger, Manfred Schlüter, Sylvia Schopf, Pete Smith, Christa Zeuch. Illustrations: Manfred Schlüter. Paperback 2016, ISBN 978-3-8423-8326-5.

==== Non-fiction Books ====
- Briefe von Kemal Kurt (1947–2002) − mit Kommentaren, Nachrufen und Rezensionen. Paperback 2013, ISBN 978-1-4818-7999-6 (E-Book: EAN/ISBN 978-3-8476-2863-7).
- Berchtesgadener Panoptikum – Eine Bilderserie von Peter Karger. Exhibition catalogue. Paperback 2014, ISBN 978-1-5052-6382-4 (E-Book: EAN/ISBN 978-3-7380-2261-2).
- Kolibri (Werner Blattmann): Das große Zeichenbuch – 1975-2000. Catalogue raisonné. Paperback 2016. ISBN 978-1-5301-4102-9.
- SchreibLese : Ansichten – Absichten – Einsichten. Authors: Gabriele Beyerlein, Ulrich Karger, Manfred Schlüter, Pete Smith, Ella Theiss, Christa Zeuch. Bilder: Manfred Schlüter. Paperback 2022, ISBN 978-3-347-66464-7.
