= Jack Prelutsky =

American writer of children's poetry

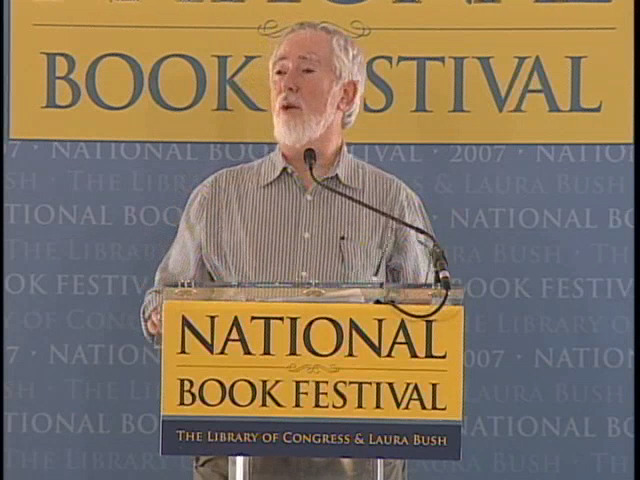
- at the Library of Congress in 2007
- Born: September 8, 1940 (age 86); Brooklyn, New York, U.S.
- Education: The High School of Music & Art; Hunter College
- Occupation: Poet
- Spouse: Carolynn Prelutsky
- Writing career
- Language: English
- Genre: Children's poetry
- Notable awards: U.S. Children's Poet Laureate (2006) (Poetry Foundation); Scandiuzzi Children's Book Award (2007) (Washington State Book Award)
- Website: jackprelutsky.com

Jack Prelutsky (born September 8, 1940) is an American writer of children's poetry who has published over 50 poetry collections. He served as the first U.S. Children's Poet Laureate (now called the Young People's Poet Laureate) from 2006 to 2008 when the Poetry Foundation established the award.

== Early life ==
Jack Prelutsky was born on September 8, 1940, in Brooklyn, New York, to Charles Prelutsky, an electrician, and Dorothea Prelutsky, a homemaker.

He attended local public schools in the Bronx, hated the experience, and was bored in class. Prelutsky claims to have hated poetry when he was younger. He stated that "When I was a kid, I didn't like poetry, because I had a teacher who didn't like poetry. She was a good teacher because she taught me not to like it, too."

After teachers discovered he had musical talents, they suggested that he attend The High School of Music & Art. He graduated in 1958, and went on to Hunter College for two years. He failed English three times before dropping out.

Before becoming a writer, he worked odd jobs, including cab driver, furniture mover, busboy, potter, woodworker, and door-to-door salesman. In the late 1960s, he was working in a bookstore in Greenwich Village and at Izzy Young's Folklore Center, singing in coffeehouses under the name Jack Ballard. While doing the latter he met Bob Dylan, became friends, and Dylan even stated that Prelutsky sounded "like a cross between Woody Guthrie and Enrico Caruso."

Prelutsky also loved to draw imaginary turtle animals, and a friend of his encouraged him to send it to a publisher in New York. He wrote poems to go with the drawings at the last minute. He met with Susan Hirschman, and was amazed when they wanted his work; not the drawings that took six months to draw, but the poems which took two hours. He was 24 at the time, and the poems appeared in his first book, A Gopher in the Garden and Other Animal Poems, in 1967. Hirschman told him he was a natural poet, published his book, and remained his editor until she retired 37 years later.

== Poetry ==
Prelutsky has written more than 50 poetry collections, including Nightmares: Poems to Trouble Your Sleep (1976), It's Halloween (1977), The Mean Old Mean Hyena (1978), and Something BIG Has Been Here (1990). He has also compiled numerous children's anthologies comprising poems of others.

He has also set his poems to music on the audio versions of his anthologies. He often sings and plays guitar on them.

In 2006, the Poetry Foundation named Prelutsky the inaugural winner of the Children's Poet Laureate award.

In 2007, the Washington Poets Association awarded Prelutsky a Lifetime Achievement Award.

In 1996, he appeared as himself on the popular animated television series Arthur, in the episode "I'm a Poet" (S1E28a).

His book Behold the Bold Umbrellaphant and Other Poems (illustrated by Carin Berger) won the 2007 Scandiuzzi Children's Book Award of the Washington State Book Awards in the Picture Book category.

In 1993, his poetry collection The New Kid on the Block was made into an interactive story book by Brøderbund's Living Books series.

Prelutsky has garnered many awards in his long career including citations as: New York Times Outstanding Book of the Year, School Library Journal Best of the Best Book, International Reading Association/Children's Book Council Children's Choice, Library of Congress Book of the Year, Parents' Choice Award, American Library Association Notable Children's Recording, an Association for Library Services to Children Notable Book and Booklist Editor's Choice, among others. His combined works have sold over a million copies and been translated into many languages.

In 2018, his poem "Homework! Oh, Homework!" was featured in a national commercial for Apple's iPad.

== Bibliography ==
- A Gopher in the Garden and Other Animal Poems (1967) (illustrated by Robert Leydenfrost)
- The Terrible Tiger (1970) (illustrated by Arnold Lobel)
- Toucans Two and Other Poems (1970) (illustrated by José Aruego)
- Circus (1974) (illustrated by Arnold Lobel)
- Nightmares: Poems to Trouble Your Sleep (1976) (illustrated by Arnold Lobel)
- It's Halloween (1977) (illustrated by Marylin Hafner)
- The Mean Old Mean Hyena (1978) (illustrated by Arnold Lobel)
- The Queen of Eene (1978) (illustrated by Victoria Chess)
- Rainy Rainy Saturday (1980) (illustrated by Marilyn Hafner)
- The Headless Horseman Rides Tonight: More Poems to Trouble Your Sleep (1980) (illustrated by Arnold Lobel)
- It's Christmas (1981) (illustrated by Marylin Hafner)
- It's Thanksgiving (1982) (illustrated by Marylin Hafner)
- Kermit's Garden of Verses (1982) (illustrated by Bruce McNally)
- The Baby Uggs Are Hatching (1982) (illustrated by James Stevenson)
- It's Valentine's Day (1983) (illustrated by Yossi Abulafia)
- Zoo Doings (1983) (illustrated by Paul O. Zelinsky)
- The Random House Book of Poetry for Children (1983) (illustrated by Arnold Lobel)
- It's Snowing! It's Snowing! (1984) (illustrated by Jeanne Titherington)
- What I Did Last Summer (1984) (illustrated by Yossi Abulafia)
- The New Kid on the Block (1984) (illustrated by James Stevenson)
- Ride a Purple Pelican (1984) (illustrated by Garth Williams)
- My Parents Think I'm Sleeping (1985) (illustrated by Yossi Abulafia)
- Read Aloud-Rhymes for the Very Young (1986) (illustrated by Marc Brown)
- Tyrannosaurus Was a Beast: Dinosaur Poems (1988) (illustrated by Arnold Lobel)
- Beneath a Blue Umbrella (1990) (illustrated by Garth Williams)
- Something BIG Has Been Here (1990) (illustrated by James Stevenson)
- For Laughing Out Loud: Poems to Tickle Your Funnybone (1991) (illustrated by Marjorie Priceman)
- There'll Be a Slight Delay: and Other Poems for Grown-ups (1991) (illustrated by Jack Ziegler)
- A. Nonny Mouse Writes Again! (1993) (illustrated by Marjorie Priceman)
- The Dragons Are Singing Tonight (1993) (illustrated by Peter Sís)
- Monday's Troll (1996) (illustrated by Peter Sís)
- A Pizza the Size of the Sun (1996) (illustrated by James Stevenson)
- The Beauty of the Beast: Poems from the Animal Kingdom (1997) (illustrated by Meilo So)
- Hooray for Diffendoofer Day! (1998) (with Dr. Seuss; illustrated by Lane Smith)
- Dog Days: Rhymes around the Year (1999) (illustrated by Dyanna Wolcott)
- The Gargoyle on the Roof (1999) (illustrated by Peter Sís)
- The 20th Century Children's Poetry Treasury (1999) (illustrated by Meilo So)
- It's Raining Pigs and Noodles (2000) (illustrated by James Stevenson)
- Awful Ogre's Awful Day (2001) (illustrated by Paul O. Zelinsky)
- The Frogs Wore Red Suspenders (2002) (illustrated by Petra Mathers)
- Scranimals (2002) (illustrated by Peter Sís)
- If Not for the Cat (2004) (illustrated by Ted Rand)
- Wild Witches' Ball (2004) (illustrated by Kelly Ashbury)
- Behold the Bold Umbrellaphant and Other Poems (2006) (illustrated by Carin Berger)
- I'm Glad I'm Me: Poems About You (2006)
- What a Day It Was at School! (2006) (illustrated by Doug Cushman)
- Good Sports: Rhymes about Running, Jumping, Throwing, and More (2007) (illustrated by Chris Raschka)
- In Aunt Giraffe's Green Garden (2007) (illustrated by Petra Mathers)
- Me I Am! (2007) (illustrated by Christine Davenier)
- The Wizard (2007) (illustrated by Brandon Dorman)
- Awful Ogre Running Wild (2008) (illustrated by Paul O. Zelinsky)
- My Dog May Be a Genius (2008) (illustrated by James Stevenson)
- Be Glad Your Nose Is on Your Face and Other Poems (2008) (illustrated by Brandon Dorman)
- Pizza, Pigs, and Poetry: How to Write a Poem (2008)
- The Swamps of Sleethe: Stories from Beyond the Solar System (2009) (illustrated by Jimmy Pickering)
- The Carnival of the Animals (2010) (illustrated by Mary GrandPré)
- There's No Place Like School (2010) (illustrated by Jane Manning)
- I've Lost My Hippopotamus (2012) (illustrated by Jackie Urbanovic)
- Stardines Swim High Across the Sky and Other Poems (2013) (illustrated by Carin Berger)
- The Silver Moon: Lullabies and Cradle Songs (2013) (illustrated by Jui Ishida)

== Sources ==
- "A Children's What?". Poetry Foundation. 21 September 2006.
