= Death Makes a Holiday =

Book by David J. Skal

- Author: David J. Skal
- Language: English
- Subject: Halloween
- Genre: Nonfiction
- Publisher: Bloomsbury USA
- Publication date: September 21, 2002
- Publication place: United States
- Media type: Hardcover
- Pages: 224
- ISBN: 9781582342306

Death Makes a Holiday: A Cultural History of Halloween is a 2002 non-fiction book by David J. Skal.

== Book summary ==
The book talks about the history of Halloween such as exploring its dark Celtic history and talking about why it was evolved. The author travels throughout the United States and reviews people about what they think of Halloween such as people that go to extraordinary lengths, businessmen who see Halloween in terms of money, and practicing witches. The book tries to explain what the many rituals and traditions say about people's psyche. It talks about such things as myths, horror films, and haunted houses.

== Reception ==
A review from the book The Year's Best Fantasy and Horror says: "Death Makes a Holiday: A Cultural History of Halloween is an entertaining dissection of the holiday horror aficionados love best by an expert in pop culture. I was hooked from the first chapter, which explores the urban myth of poisoned and booby-trapped candy". The book was used as a reference in the books Salem: Place, Myth, and Memory, The Cute and the Cool: Wondrous Innocence and Modern American Children's Culture, and From Shaman to Scientist: Essays on Humanity's Search for Spirits.

== See also ==
- Bibliography of Halloween
