= Kazuno Kohara =

Kazuno Kohara is an author and illustrator of children’s books. She grew up in Japan and now lives in the United Kingdom.

Her books feature linocut illustrations in one or two colors. Her book Ghosts in the House was named a Best Illustrated Children’s Book of 2008 by The New York Times.

== Bibliography ==
- Ghosts in the House!, Roaring Brook Press, 2008
- Here Comes Jack Frost, Roaring Brook Press, 2009
- Little Wizard, Roaring Brook Press, 2010
- The Midnight Library, Roaring Brook Press, 2014
