= Journal of Popular Film & Television =

Journal of Popular Film and Television
- Discipline: Media studies
- Language: English

Publication details
- History: 1972–present
- Publisher: Taylor and Francis (United States)
- Frequency: Quarterly

Standard abbreviations
- ISO 4: J. Pop. Film Telev.

Indexing
- ISSN: 0195-6051 (print); 1930-6458 (web)
- LCCN: 80640493
- OCLC no.: 746948137

Links
- Journal homepage; Online access; Online archive

Journal of Popular Film and Television is a quarterly peer-reviewed academic journal published by Routledge (part of Taylor & Francis), which purchased it from Heldref Publications in 2009. Michael Marsden, who was the dean of the College of Arts & Sciences at Northern Michigan University in the late 1990s, co-founded the journal with Sam L Grogg and John G. Nachbar. The journal was established in 1971, with the first issue in 1972 and until 1978 was titled Journal of Popular Film. The journal is devoted to publishing criticism that "examines commercial film and television from a sociocultural perspective."

== Abstracting and indexing ==
The journal is abstracted and indexed by Current Contents/Arts & Humanities, EBSCOhost, MLA International Bibliography, Scopus, and the Arts & Humanities Citation Index.

== See also ==
- List of film periodicals
