= Marvin Kitman =

American humorist and television critic (1929–2023)

Marvin Kitman (November 24, 1929 – June 29, 2023) was an American television critic, humorist, and author. He was a columnist for Newsday for 35 years and was a finalist for the Pulitzer Prize for Criticism in 1982. Kitman was the author of nine books, including two on George Washington that combine humor with extensive historical research.

== Early life and education ==
Kitman was born on November 24, 1929, in Pittsburgh, Pennsylvania, to Jewish parents who had immigrated from Russia. His family moved to Bensonhurst, Brooklyn, in New York City, during his childhood. A line he subsequently used often was, "Some parents send their kids to Switzerland 'for finishing'; mine brought me to Brooklyn." In any case, he remained a fan of the Pittsburgh Pirates throughout his life.

Kitman attended Brooklyn Technical High School, graduating in 1947.

He attended Baruch College in New York City, first as a night student and then as a day student, before transferring within the city university system to the City College of New York, from which he graduated with a Bachelor of Arts in 1953. He worked on the student newspaper, The Ticker, under its editor-in-chief Ralph Ginzburg, and there developed an aptitude for writing.

== Marriage, military service, and family ==
Kitman married the former Carol Sibushnick in 1951. She became a photographer.

Kitman was drafted into the U.S. Army, where he served from 1953 to 1955 during the Korean War. During this time, he was a member of the 47th Infantry Regiment in the 9th Infantry Division stationed at Fort Dix. In his later telling, he "rose in only two years to the rank of private first class". Among his duties was serving as a sportswriter for the Fort Dix base newspaper.

Upon his return, the couple raised a son and two daughters. They became longtime residents of Leonia, New Jersey, beginning in 1961. He became active in several organizations within the town. He lived across the street from novelist Robert Ludlum, then working on the first in a long list of thrillers, the sight of which Kitman later said inspired him to get serious about his own writing.

== Early career ==
Kitman worked as a freelance writer during the 1950s and 1960s. For ten years he wrote a column for The Armstrong Daily, a horseracing tout sheet. The cleverness of these efforts led to Paul Krassner hiring him to write satirical consumer advocacy for The Realist, which included pieces that took television commercials literally or imagined sardonic extremes of Cold War preparedness.

Beginning in 1963, Kitman became a managing editor of Monocle, a satirical magazine of the 1950s and 1960s. He subsequently became an officer and partner in Monocle's periodicals and books divisions. Kitman was one of Monocle editors who created the idea of the Report from Iron Mountain satirical hoax, which was written and published by Leonard Lewin in 1967 and subsequently believed as true by many. He also worked as a staff writer for The Saturday Evening Post during 1965–66.

Taking on politics, Kitman staged a mock run in the 1964 United States presidential election, entering the New Hampshire primary for the Republican Party. (According to the recollections of one of his fellow Monocle editors, Kitman actually was a registered Republican at the time.) He ran as a "Lincoln Republican" who would finish the unmet campaign promises of 1864, such as providing for civil rights, and said that accordingly "I am the only truly reactionary Republican in the race." He also mentioned his Jewish upbringing, say he was "twice as Jewish" as candidate and eventual nominee Barry Goldwater, whom he labeled a "McKinley Republican". His campaign slogan was "I would rather be President than write." Kitman said the delegate pledged to him received 725 votes in the primary, but that he was demanding a recount as "there was some kind of fraud in my getting so many." He carried his campaign on a bit further, including staging a $1-a-plate fundraising dinner at a self-service cafeteria in New York.

Kitman had a brief period working in advertising in New York: first as a "humorist-in-residence" with the firm of Solow/Wexton during 1966–67 and then as a copywriter for the firm Carl Ally during 1967–68.

== Television critic ==
Kitman was one of the earlier, and longer-lasting, television critics. He began his efforts in this arena writing for The New Leader in 1967. He then started his run at Newsday on December 7, 1969 ("A day that will live in infamy, as far as the TV industry is concerned," Kitman remarked, while Bill Moyers, publisher of the paper, later said: "I hired Marvin because we needed his wit, without which a media critic is a warrior without a sword.") He remained at Newsday until April 1, 2005, totaling 5,786 columns. The column was called "The Marvin Kitman Show" and Kitman was credited as its "Executive Producer". It ran three times a week in Newsday and was also distributed by the Los Angeles Times Syndicate. Kitman worked from his home in Leonia the entire time, avoiding the commute to Melville, New York, where the paper was published, and in the earlier years sometimes using couriers to carry videotapes and copy back and forth. When the time came for the column to end, Kitman said in typical fashion, "Newsday gave me a tryout, and after 35 years we decided it wasn't working out."

Kitman held strong views about the lack of quality of much of what was on television during his time as a critic; much of what he wrote about was during the period well after the original Golden Age of Television and before the Second Golden Age. Regarding the premiere of the sixth season of Saturday Night Live in 1980, the first with none of the original cast, he called it "offensive and raunchy" without being funny. "This new edition is terrible. Call it 'Saturday Night Dead on Arrival'." In reaction to the 1983 television film Kentucky Woman, starring ex-Charlie's Angels lead Cheryl Ladd in a serious role, Kitman wrote, "Cheryl Ladd as a coal miner was a very moving television experience. It made me want to convert to nuclear power." Regarding his need to judge television news programs, he summed that he had spent "thirty-five years of getting paid to watch the bad, the bemused, and the blond of TV news." He coined the so-called Kitman's Law: "On the TV screen pure drivel tends to drive off ordinary drivel." Writer Bob Klapisch has described Kitman's style as "like sarcasm dried to a delicate crisp." A former colleague who later became an executive director at Stony Brook University's School of Communication and Journalism said of Kitman, "He was a distinct voice, an original, and whether you were put off by his work or loved him, he was one of a kind – funny, irreverent, perhaps insufferable on occasion but never dull."

In any case, Kitman recognized that by and after the end of his tenure at Newsday, there was a wave of quality series on television, which he claimed a connection to: "I take credit for [today's better programming] because I used to say cable was the answer. The whole fallacy was that television was giving the public what they wanted, but the public didn't know what was out there until cable showed what can happen – all the great stories, all the great acting – when you're not worried about ratings." In retrospect, Kitman has identified the 1980s series Hill Street Blues as a turning point in American broadcast television quality, although not fully capitalized on at the time.

Kitman had two runs on television as a critic on New York local news, first with WPIX Channel 11 in 1973–74 and later for several years with WNEW Channel 5 on Saturday nights during the 1980s. He was also a frequent panelist on the show All About TV which appeared on WNYC-TV. He had a radio show known as "Watching TV" on the RKO Radio Network in the early 1980s.

== Author ==
Kirkus Reviews said of 1969's You Can't Judge a Book By Its Cover, a collection of humor pieces by Kitman, "He talks and he talks ... but he talks. Yet the groggy reader is usually jarred into ordering more coffee and reading on." Kitman wrote several other books that were explicit humorist efforts. He also wrote about television, in particular in I Am a VCR (1988), which was about the effect watching television constantly for two decades was having on the author. The Chicago Tribune found that "Kitman generally finesses his contradictory viewpoint that television is both contemptible and fascinating.... VCR has its chuckles, but Kitman's joke-a-line style makes for a book best 'watched' in several installments, one with all the permanence of the medium it covers."

Kitman was a co-creator and co-writer, along with Jim Bouton and Vic Ziegel, of the short-lived 1976 television situation comedy Ball Four, based upon Bouton's book of the same name. It gave Kitman a chance to see the television creative process from the inside. As he later recalled: "It was the constant rewriting at night, how everyone was always so exhausted. And the input from the executives – all they knew about writing was the alphabet, but they were the ones who kept saying, 'This is the way it's always been done.'"

External videos
- Booknotes interview with Kitman on The Making of the Prefident, 1789, December 26, 1989, C-SPAN

Kitman wrote two books about George Washington that combined humor with extensive historical research. The first was George Washington's Expense Account, published in 1970, which capitalized on Washington having declined a salary while serving as Commander-in-Chief of the Continental Army and instead only asking for his expenses to be reimbursed. Billed as being by coauthors "General George Washington and Marvin Kitman, Pfc (Ret.)", it presents in facsimile form Washington's ledger from 1775 to 1783 combined with Kitman's investigations and discussions regarding the expenses. Kitman's theme is that Washington foreshadowed the modern practice of maintaining, and sometimes manipulating, expense accounts. The book made the New York Times Book Review's "New and Recommended" list; a profile from that paper noted Kitman's "serious digging in various archives" and said that "Kitman's interpretation[s] keep crossing the line that divides verity from travesty." The second work was The Making of the Prefident 1789, with the fifth word of the title intentionally misspelled to make it look like a colonial-era use of the long s. First envisioned in 1972 or before, when Theodore H. White's The Making of the President books were popular, it was published in 1989 and sought to explore how Washington and his supporters managed to get into a position where he was unopposed in the 1788–89 United States presidential election. It again drew comic parallels between those events and politics in modern times.

Judged as history, reactions to Kitman's two Washington works were mixed. Brent Tarter, a public historian in Virginia, wrote that the first was "temporarily amusing but highly perishable" while the second was "sometimes carelessly and sometimes even deliberately contemptuous of evidence; it destroys Kitman's credibility with serious readers. Whatever useful he might have to say is impeached by his over-clever prose and his twisting of facts and misrepresentation of historical context in order to make puns, draw irrelevant parallels, and otherwise write in [a] flip and entertaining style ..." British historian Marcus Cunliffe did not quibble with the accuracy of George Washington's Expense Account but found its interpretation comparing Washington to modern practices too stretched. But historian of Virginia William H. Stauffer found the same work "informative" and "praiseworthy" for the full light it shed on Washington's character. Art historian and Washington iconographer Karal Ann Marling said that while The Making of the Prefident 1789 maintained an "air of pie-in-the-face irreverence," Kitman had demonstrated that he could "moonlight in the library with the best of 'em." And American historian Francis Jennings cited George Washington's Expense Account regarding the subject's drinking habits, and noted that it contains "hilarious and fully documented analysis" and that "as my trade's custom is to deplore such irreverence, let it be noted that the book includes a facsimile of the account in question."

In 2007, Kitman published a biography of the popular but controversial television commentator Bill O'Reilly. Titled The Man Who Would Not Shut Up, it was based upon 29 interviews Kitman conducted with the subject as well as large amounts of research. Although politically liberal, Kitman had often admired the mostly conservative O'Reilly as a broadcaster and O'Reilly in turn had read Kitman's Newsday columns growing up. Publishers Weekly said "it's difficult to imagine a better-researched or less-biased work about such a divisive figure as O'Reilly". The New York Times praised Kitman for doing Boswellian amounts of research and constructing a well-written narrative, but ultimately concluded that the positive aspect of the portrayal was "unconvincing" and a "mash note". Nevertheless, O'Reilly hated the book, apparently because Kitman addressed the 2004 sexual harassment charges against the star by one of his program's female producers, and refused to follow through on what Kitman said was an agreement to feature the author and the book on the show. As a result, sales of the book suffered, as did Kitman's opinion of O'Reilly. (A decade later, O'Reilly would be forced off television by reporting of a number of sexual harassment suits settled by O'Reilly's employer on his behalf.)

== Later years ==
After ending his Newsday column, Kitman remained active in that idiom, well into his eighties and then nineties. In 2008, he wrote a regular column for the Huffington Post. Subsequently he voiced unhappiness over that site's disinclination to pay its contributors. During 2011–12, he wrote columns on business, media, and politics for the Investor uprising business information site, which did pay. But it then folded. And starting in 2013 he posted columns on television and politics to his MarvinKitman.com website. Such posts continued through 2020, Subsequently Kitman made his "Justaminuteman" postings and other observations on politics on the Twitter and Substack platforms.

== Death ==
Kitman died of cancer on June 29, 2023, at the Lillian Booth Actors Home in Englewood, New Jersey. He had been ill for two months, and spent his last month at the home, located adjacent to Leonia. He was 93.

== Awards and honors ==
In 1982, Kitman was a finalist for the Pulitzer Prize for Criticism.

Kitman was given the Humorous Writing Award from the Society of the Silurians, a New York-based press organization, in 1991 and a Special Commentary Award from the same body in 1993.

Kitman received City College's Townsend Harris Medal in 1992. He was given the James W. Carey Award for Outstanding Media Ecology Journalism from the Media Ecology Association in 2008.

Kitman was inducted into the Brooklyn Tech Hall of Fame in 1998.

== Published works ==
- The Number One Best Seller: The True Adventures of Marvin Kitman (Dial Press, 1966) (OCLC 1370982)
- The Red Chinese Air Force Exercise, Diet, and Sex Book (Stein & Day, 1968) ["translated by William Randolph Hirsch", pseudonym for Kitman, Richard Lingeman, and Victor Navasky] (OCLC 914232)
- You Can't Judge a Book By Its Cover (Weybright & Talley, 1969) (OCLC 67666)
- George Washington's Expense Account (Simon & Schuster, 1970) [co-author with George Washington] (reprinted by Grove, 2001) (OCLC 5193653)
- The Marvin Kitman Show: An Encyclopedia Televisiana (Outerbridge & Diensfrey, 1973) (OCLC 520610)
- The Coward's Almanac (Doubleday, 1975) [with drawings by Lou Myers] (OCLC 32658197)
- I Am a VCR: The Kitman Tapes (Random House, 1988) (OCLC 17548847)
- The Making of the Prefident 1789: The Unauthorized Campaign Biography (HarperCollins, 1989) (OCLC 18740778)
- The Man Who Would Not Shut Up: The Rise of Bill O'Reilly (St. Martin's Press, 2007) (OCLC 71146597)
- Gullible's Travels: A Comical History of the Trump Era (Seven Stories Press, 2020) (OCLC 1112386764)
