= Discover (magazine) =

American general audience science magazine

- Cover of the March–April 2024 issue
- Editor: Erin Berge
- Former editors: Steve George
- Categories: Science
- Frequency: 4 per year
- Total circulation: 124,351 (December 2025)
- First issue: 1980
- Company: LabX Media Group
- Country: Canada
- Based in: Midland, Ontario, Canada
- Language: English
- Website: discovermagazine.com
- ISSN: 0274-7529

Discover is an American general audience science magazine launched in October 1980 by Time Inc. It is currently owned by LabX Media Group.

== History ==
=== Founding ===
Discover was created primarily through the efforts of Time magazine editor Leon Jaroff. He noticed that magazine sales jumped every time the cover featured a science topic. Jaroff interpreted this as a considerable public interest in science, and in 1971, he began agitating for the creation of a science-oriented magazine. This was difficult, as a former colleague noted, because "Selling science to people who graduated to be managers was very difficult".

Jaroff's persistence finally paid off, and Discover magazine published its first edition in 1980. Discover was originally launched into a burgeoning market for science magazines aimed at educated non-professionals, intended to be easier to read than Scientific American but more detailed and science-oriented than Popular Science. A year earlier, the American Association for the Advancement of Science (AAAS) had launched a similar magazine called Science 80 (not to be confused with its flagship academic journal, Science). Shortly thereafter, both Science News and Science Digest changed their formats to follow the new trend.

During this period, Discover featured fairly in-depth science reporting on "hard science" and avoided fringe topics like extraterrestrial intelligence. Most issues contained essays by well-known scientists—such as Stephen Jay Gould, Jared Diamond, and Stephen Hawking. Another common article was a biography, often linked with mentions of other scientists working in the field. The "Skeptical Eye" column sought to uncover pop-science scams, and was the medium where James Randi released the results of Project Alpha. Jaroff said that it was the most-read section at its launch.

=== Competition and change ===
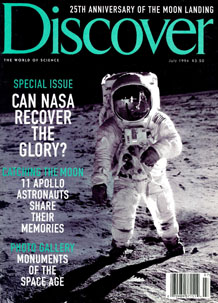
Cover of the July 1994 issue

The sudden appearance of so many magazines in the same market space inevitably led to some falling by the wayside, and Discover was left largely alone in its market space by the mid-1980s; it nevertheless decided to appeal to a wider audience by including articles on psychology and psychiatry. Jaroff told the editor-in-chief that these were not "solid sciences", and was sent back to Discover's parent, Time, Inc. "Skeptical Eye" and other columns disappeared, and articles covered more controversial, speculative topics (like "How the Universe Will End"). The new format was a great success, and the new format remained largely unchanged for the next two decades.

Gilbert Rogin, a Sports Illustrated editor, was brought in 1985 to revive Discover. In 1986, Time purchased the subscription lists of the shuttered magazines Science Digest and Science 86 from their publishers. Circulation for the magazine reached 925,000 by May 1987 with revenue for 1986 being $6.9 million, but annual net loss was $10 million.

In January 1987, Time appointed a new Discover publisher, Bruce A. Barnet, previously publisher of Picture Week test magazine from August 1985 to replace James B. Hayes, who was appointed publisher of Fortune.

The magazine changed hands several times. In 1987, Time, Inc. sold Discover to Family Media, the owners of Health, Golf Illustrated, Homeowner, 1,001 Home Ideas and World Tennis, for $26 million. From January to July 1991, Discover magazine lost 15% of its advertising while still remaining profitable. Family Media closed down while suspending publication of all its magazines and placing them up for sale. Family Media's last Discover issue was August 1991, with a circulation of 1.1 million copies.

In September 1991, The Walt Disney Company bought the magazine for its Disney Publishing's Magazine Group. The magazine's main office was moved to the Magazine Group office in Burbank while leaving one third behind in New York in a small editorial and advertising office. Disney was able to retain Family Media's editor-in-chief for the magazine, Paul Hoffman. Disney doubled the magazine's photography and its content budget to overcome skipping two issues in Family Media's shutdown and ownership change. In 1993, Disney Magazine Publishing Inc. decided to launch a trade advertising campaign designed with advertising firm Ziff Marketing to raise awareness in the advertising field that the magazine is an accessible general interest magazine in the science category.

In October 2005, Bob Guccione, Jr., founder of Spin and Gear magazines, and some private equity partners purchased the magazine from Disney. Guccione was CEO and oversaw a redesign for the April 2006 issue. However, Guccione was ousted as CEO in October 2007 in what was described as "a falling-out over philosophical differences with his financial backers". Henry Donahue, Discover Media's chief financial officer, became the new CEO. In 2008, he also assumed the role of publisher. In October 2008, Corey Powell, Discover's executive editor, became editor-in-chief. As of April 2009, the magazine published combined issues in January/February and July/August, for a total of ten issues a year.

In 2010 the magazine was sold to Kalmbach Publishing, whose books and magazines are generally about craft and hobby subjects such as modeling (Model Railroader, FineScale Modeler, Scale Auto, Classic Toy Trains, Garden Railways, Model Retailer), beadwork (BeadStyle, Bead&Button, Art Jewelry), and the outdoors (Birder's World, Cabin Life, American Snowmobiler). It has one other science magazine, Astronomy. In August 2012 Kalmbach announced that Discover would be moving from New York City to Kalmbach's headquarters in Wisconsin in January 2013. In December 2012, Stephen C. George became the editor-in-chief. Becky Lang was the editor-in-chief until mid-2020.

On May 1, 2024, Kalmbach Media announced the sale of most of its titles to Firecrown Media, as well as its Kalmbach Books division and related e-commerce sites, leaving Discover magazine as its sole remaining publication. and on November 8, 2024, LabX Media Group acquired Discover from Kalmbach.

== Blog portal ==
The Discover website includes a collection of blogs related to science, including Cosmic Variance, Carl Zimmer's The Loom, and Melissa Lafsky's Reality Base.

== TV series ==
From 1983–1990, PBS aired Discover: The World of Science, a monthly hour-long news magazine featuring topics from the publication and hosted by Peter Graves.

== See also ==
- Stephen Petranek – former editor
- Science Digest (1937-1988)
