= Cosmic Variance =

Cosmic Variance may refer to:

- Cosmic variance, in cosmology, the statistical uncertainty inherent in observations of the universe at extreme distances
- Cosmic Variance (blog), a collaborative weblog discussing physics, astrophysics, and other topics
