= I Managed Good, But Boy Did They Play Bad =

Anthology book about baseball

I Managed Good, But Boy Did They Play Bad is a collection of essays, short stories and articles about baseball, combined with comments and articles written by Ball Four author and former major league pitcher Jim Bouton.

== The book's creation ==
The book is unusual in that Bouton fully acknowledges that he did not write much of it, nor did he do the research. Reporter Neil Offen was hired by Bouton to research the material, and he and Bouton made the selections themselves. Bouton's candor in crediting Offen is much like his style of writing in Ball Four.

The book is also unusual in how it lampoons the publishing industry. Bouton writes that the book existed solely because Playboy Press thought that a baseball book with Bouton's name on it would sell enough to make a tidy profit. Bouton turned the tables on the publishers when he demanded complete control of the project, and demanded that he alone would hire a researcher (and then he met Offen at Bloomingdale's while shopping for clothes—Bouton was well aware of Offen's talents, plus he knew that Offen had just recently been fired, so would work hard on the project).

In creating the book, Bouton and Offen agreed that they would select stories that met their personal tastes, not just vapid pieces glorifying their subjects (Bouton even apologizes to the late New York Yankees manager Miller Huggins because they found no interesting stories written about him, so he was not included in the book). Also, Bouton wrote introductions to each selection, as well as several chapters on his own managers, including his Seattle Pilots manager profiled in Ball Four, Joe Schultz. Bouton also added his opinions on the collapse of the "Yankee Dynasty" in 1965, and the roles that the three managers of that era (Ralph Houk, Yogi Berra and Johnny Keane) played in that fall from glory.

Bouton and Offen twice chose works that contradicted themselves over their subject; the articles for both Casey Stengel and Leo Durocher offer distinctly different opinions about their subjects. They also chose one fictional manager—Squawks Magrew, created by James Thurber in his short story, "You Could Look It Up".

== The managers ==
- Rocky Bridges: "I Managed Good, But Boy Did They Play Bad" by Gilbert Rogin
- John McGraw: "From the Bench" by Christy Mathewson, also featuring interviews about McGraw from Lawrence Ritter's The Glory of Their Times
- Casey Stengel:"Musings of a Dugout Socrates" by Gillbert Millstein; "The Last Angry Old Man" by Edward Linn
- Ralph Houk, Yogi Berra, and Johnny Keane: "Which One of Us Took the Greater Fall?" by Bill Veeck; "A Locker Room View" by Jim Bouton
- Connie Mack: "Cornelius McGillicuddy – Mr. Mack" by Bob Considine
- Walter Alston: "Manager With a Hair shirt" by Melvin Durslag
- Leo Durocher: "They Ain't Getting No Maiden" by Roger Kahn; "How Durocher Blew the Pennant" by William Barry Furlong
- Chuck Dressen: "Advisor to Presidents" by John Lardner
- Squawks Magrew: "You Could Look It Up" by James Thurber
- Joe McCarthy: "Nobody's Neutral" by Ed Fitzgerald
- Dick Williams: "How Dick Williams Became the World Champion Manager" by Jim Bouton
- George Stallings: "The Miracle Man" by Tom Meany
- Joe Schultz: "The Manager Who Wasn't" by Jim Bouton
