= Cosmic Variance (blog) =

Cosmic Variance was a collaborative weblog discussing physics, astrophysics, and other topics, written by JoAnne Hewett, Mark Trodden, Sean Carroll, Risa Wechsler, Julianne Dalcanton, Clifford Johnson, John Conway, and Daniel Holz. It was the successor to Carroll's earlier blog Preposterous Universe, which began in early 2004 and ran through much of 2005. The blog's name came from th concept of cosmic variance in cosmology.

Cosmic Variance rapidly become "undoubtedly the most popular blog written by physicists." In 2006, Nature reported that it was the fourth most popular science blog and one of only five blogs by scientists in the 3500 most popular blogs. As of July 26, 2007, Cosmic Variance had a Technorati authority of 1001 and rank of 2277. In 2008, the blog became part of the Discover magazine website.

Most writing on Cosmic Variance focused on modern physics, astrophysics, and cosmology, at a level accessible to the interested non-scientist. However, topics of discussion ranged widely, including science and religion, science journalism, higher education, and politics. Several discussions on Cosmic Variance gained attention in the print media, including a discussion on women in science that compared physicist Lisa Randall to Jodie Foster and a post by John Conway about his discovery of a "bump" in particle accelerator data that turned out not to be caused by the Higgs boson. When the engagement of Carroll to science writer Jennifer Ouellette was first announced on his blog, the story was picked up by both the New York Times and the prominent scientific journal Nature.

Cosmic Variance hosted a number of guest bloggers, including string theorist Joseph Polchinski reviewing Lee Smolin's book The Trouble With Physics.
