= Vic Ziegel =

American sportswriter

Vic Ziegel in an undated photo

Victor Ziegel (August 16, 1937 – July 23, 2010) was an American sports writer, columnist, and editor for the New York Post and the New York Daily News. His writing frequently centered on baseball, boxing, and horse racing.

Ziegel was raised in the Bronx, New York. His parents, Morris and Gilda, were immigrants from Eastern Europe. Ziegel attended Yeshiva Salanter and William Howard Taft High School. He went to City College of New York, where he wrote for The Campus, the student-run newspaper. While in college, Ziegel also wrote about high-school basketball for the Long Island Press.

Ziegel wrote for the New York Post during the 1960s and 1970s. He also wrote for magazines, including Inside Sports, New York, and Rolling Stone. In 1985, Ziegel became executive sports editor at the Daily News, where he also wrote a regular sports column. He accepted a retirement package from the newspaper in 2009, but continued to write occasional columns for the Daily News as a freelance writer.

In 1976, Ziegel worked with retired baseball player Jim Bouton on Ball Four, a short-lived television series based on Bouton's best-selling book of the same name. In 1978 Ziegel co-wrote (with Lewis Grossberger) The Non-Runner's Book, which satirized the then-popular sport of marathon running. He wrote Summer in the City: New York Baseball 1947–1957 in 2004.

Ziegel, who was a non-smoker, was diagnosed with lung cancer in November 2009. He died of the disease at Calvary Hospital in the Bronx on July 23, 2010.

== Awards ==
Ziegel won several awards, including the Nat Fleischer Award for boxing writing (1983) and the Red Smith Writing Award for his Kentucky Derby coverage (1992 and 1998).
