= Aerial Assist =

2014 FIRST Robotics Competition game

- Year: 2014

Season Information
- Number of teams: 2,720
- Number of regionals: 54
- Number of district events: 44
- Championship location: Edward Jones Dome, St Louis, Missouri

FIRST Championship Awards
- Chairman's Award winner: Team 27 - "Team Rush"
- Founder's Award winner: Qualcomm
- Champions: Team 254 - "The Cheesy Poofs"; Team 469 - "Las Guerrillas"; Team 2848 - "The All Sparks"; Team 74 - "Team C.H.A.O.S."

Links
- Website: Official Website

Aerial Assist is the 2014 FIRST Robotics Competition game.

== Kickoff ==
The Kickoff event was held on January 4, 2014. Speakers included Dean Kamen and Woodie Flowers. It was broadcast on NASA TV beginning at 10:30 EST.

== Rules ==
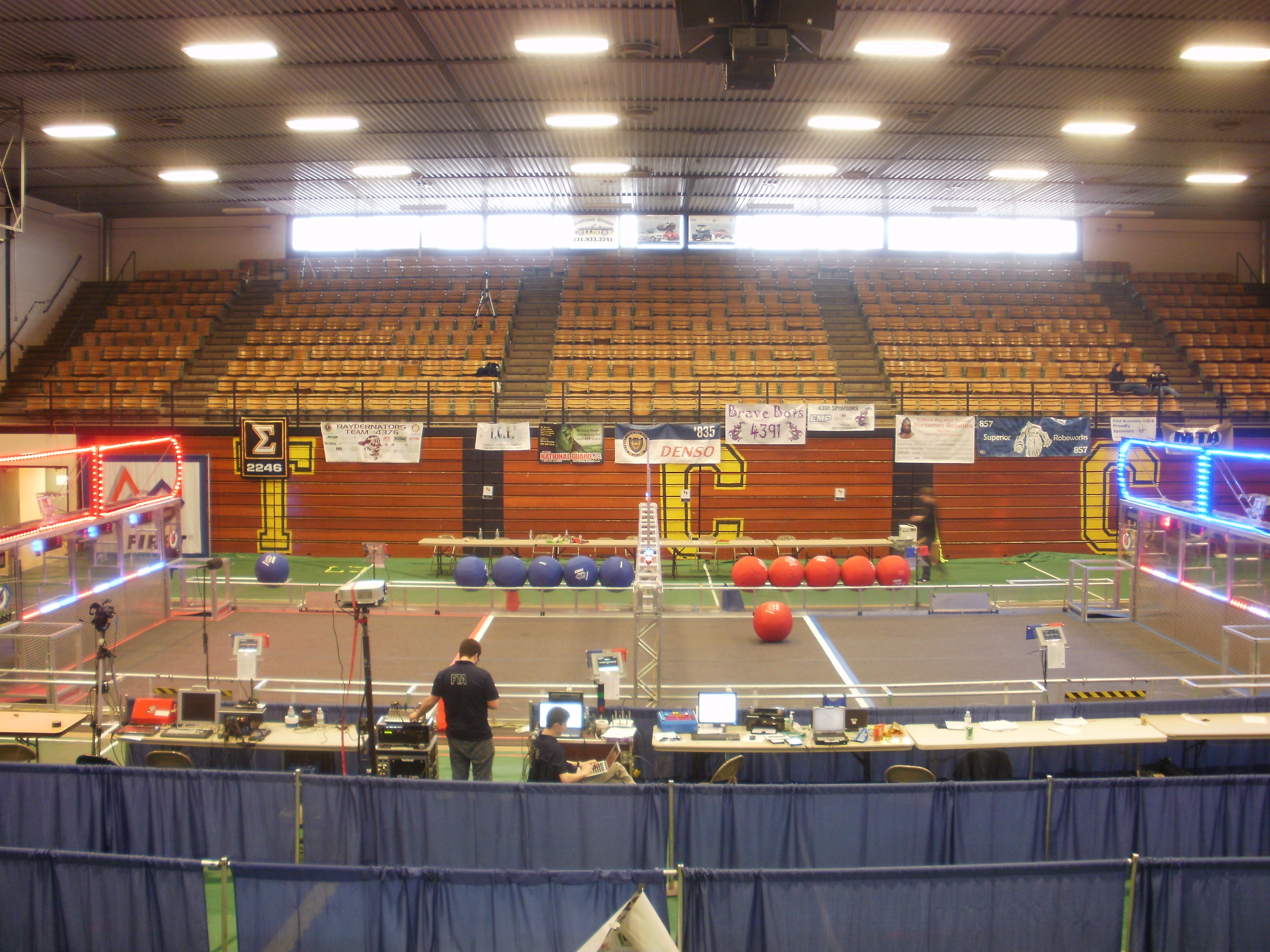
View of the field at the Traverse City district event

In the game, the alliances win via getting the scoring elements (2'-diameter exercise balls) into the scoring areas located on the far end of the field. The game starts with each robots in either the White Zone (center field) or the goalie zones. They can be preloaded with 1 game ball prior to the start. The match begins with a 10-second autonomous period, where robots use the pre-programmed instructions to score points. Said points are worth 5 more during the Autonomous period, and one goal will be lit up ("hot") during each half. That goal is worth 5 additional points, for a maximum total of a 10-point bonus. In addition, every robot that moves from the center to their own side of the field earns another five point bonus. When Tele-op starts, the teams take control of their respective robots. The cycle starts when a human player transfers a ball onto the playing field. The robots can then do either the basic goal score (take the ball to the other end of the field), or assist them in doing so. The recipient of the latter will earn bonus points (2 assists=10 points, 3 assists=30 points). Throwing the ball over the truss (the midpoint overhang) when transferring, a la volleyball, will add 10 additional points. Having an alliance partner catch it will earn 10 more points. A robot in the goalie zones can block shots via extending upwards.

== Events ==
=== Week 1 ===
Event	Dates
Central Illinois Regional	Feb 27 - Mar 1, 2014
Palmetto Regional	Feb 27 - Mar 1, 2014
Alamo Regional sponsored by Rackspace Hosting	Feb 27 - Mar 1, 2014
Inland Empire Regional	Feb 28 - Mar 2, 2014
Greater Toronto West Regional	Feb 28 - Mar 2, 2014
Center Line FIRST Robotics District Competition	Feb 28 - Mar 1, 2014
Southfield FIRST Robotics District Competition	Feb 28 - Mar 1, 2014
Granite State District Event	Feb 28 - Mar 1, 2014
PNW FIRST Robotics Auburn Mountainview District Event	Feb 28 - Mar 1, 2014
MAR FIRST Robotics Mt. Olive District Competition	Mar 1 - Mar 2, 2014
MAR FIRST Robotics Hatboro-Horsham District Competition	Mar 1 - Mar 2, 2014
Israel Regional	Mar 3 - Mar 5, 2014

=== Week 2 ===
Event	Dates
Arkansas Regional	Mar 6 to Mar 8, 2014
San Diego Regional	Mar 6 to Mar 8, 2014
Crossroads Regional	Mar 6 to Mar 8, 2014
Lake Superior Regional	Mar 6 to Mar 8, 2014
Northern Lights Regional	Mar 6 to Mar 8, 2014
UNH District Event	Mar 6 to Mar 8, 2014
Greater Toronto East Regional	Mar 6 to Mar 8, 2014
Hub City Regional	Mar 6 to Mar 8, 2014
Central Valley Regional	Mar 7 to Mar 8, 2014
Gull Lake FIRST Robotics District Competition	Mar 7 to Mar 8, 2014
Kettering University FIRST Robotics District Competition	Mar 7 to Mar 8, 2014
PNW FIRST Robotics Oregon City District Event	Mar 7 to Mar 8, 2014
PNW FIRST Robotics Glacier Peak District Event	Mar 7 to Mar 8, 2014
Groton District Event	Mar 8 to Mar 9, 2014

=== Week 3 ===
Event	Dates
Sacramento Regional	Mar 13 - Mar 15, 2014
Orlando Regional	Mar 13 - Mar 15, 2014
WPI District Event	Mar 13 - Mar 14, 2014
Greater Kansas City Regional	Mar 13 - Mar 15, 2014
St. Louis Regional	Mar 13 - Mar 15, 2014
Mexico City Regional	Mar 13 - Mar 15, 2014
North Carolina Regional	Mar 13 - Mar 15, 2014
New York Tech Valley Regional	Mar 13 - Mar 15, 2014
Dallas Regional	Mar 13 - Mar 15, 2014
Utah Regional	Mar 13 - Mar 15, 2014
Escanaba FIRST Robotics District Competition	Mar 14 - Mar 15, 2014
Howell FIRST Robotics District Competition	Mar 14 - Mar 15, 2014
MAR FIRST Robotics Springside Chestnut Hill District Competition	Mar 14 - Mar 15, 2014
PNW FIRST Robotics Eastern Washington University District Event	Mar 14 - Mar 15, 2014
PNW FIRST Robotics Mt. Vernon District Event	Mar 14 - Mar 15, 2014
MAR FIRST Robotics Clifton District Competition	Mar 15 - Mar 16, 2014

=== Week 4 ===
Event	Dates
Arizona Regional	Mar 20 - Mar 22, 2014
Los Angeles Regional sponsored by The Roddenberry Foundation	Mar 20 - Mar 22, 2014
Boilermaker Regional	Mar 20 - Mar 22, 2014
Buckeye Regional	Mar 20 - Mar 22, 2014
Waterloo Regional	Mar 20 - Mar 22, 2014
Festival de Robotique FRC a Montreal Regional	Mar 20 - Mar 22, 2014
Virginia Regional	Mar 20 - Mar 22, 2014
Wisconsin Regional	Mar 20 - Mar 22, 2014
Great Lakes Bay Region FIRST Robotics District Competition	Mar 21 - Mar 22, 2014
Traverse City FIRST Robotics District Competition	Mar 21 - Mar 22, 2014
West Michigan FIRST Robotics District Competition	Mar 21 - Mar 22, 2014
PNW FIRST Robotics Wilsonville District Event	Mar 21 - Mar 22, 2014
Rhode Island District Event	Mar 21 - Mar 22, 2014
PNW FIRST Robotics Shorewood District Event	Mar 21 - Mar 22, 2014
Southington District Event	Mar 22 - Mar 23, 2014
MAR FIRST Robotics Lenape-Seneca District Competition	Mar 22 - Mar 23, 2014

=== Week 5 ===
Event	Dates
Greater DC Regional	Mar 27 - Mar 29, 2014
Peachtree Regional	Mar 27 - Mar 29, 2014
Hawaii Regional	Mar 27 - Mar 29, 2014
Minnesota 10000 Lakes Regional	Mar 27 - Mar 29, 2014
Minnesota North Star Regional	Mar 27 - Mar 29, 2014
SBPLI Long Island Regional	Mar 27 - Mar 29, 2014
Finger Lakes Regional	Mar 27 - Mar 29, 2014
Queen City Regional	Mar 27 - Mar 29, 2014
Oklahoma Regional	Mar 27 - Mar 29, 2014
North Bay Regional	Mar 27 - Mar 29, 2014
Greater Pittsburgh Regional	Mar 27 - Mar 29, 2014
Smoky Mountains Regional	Mar 27 - Mar 29, 2014
Northeastern University District Event	Mar 28 - Mar 29, 2014
Livonia FIRST Robotics District Competition	Mar 28 - Mar 29, 2014
St. Joseph FIRST Robotics District Competition	Mar 28 - Mar 29, 2014
Waterford FIRST Robotics District Competition	Mar 28 - Mar 29, 2014
PNW FIRST Robotics Auburn District Event	Mar 28 - Mar 29, 2014
PNW FIRST Robotics Central Washington University District Event	Mar 28 - Mar 29, 2014
Hartford District Event	Mar 29 - Mar 30, 2014
MAR FIRST Robotics Bridgewater-Raritan District Competition	Mar 29 - Mar 30, 2014

=== Week 6 ===
Event	Dates
Western Canada Regional	Apr 3 - Apr 5, 2014
Silicon Valley Regional	Apr 3 - Apr 5, 2014
Colorado Regional	Apr 3 - Apr 5, 2014
South Florida Regional	Apr 3 - Apr 5, 2014
Midwest Regional	Apr 3 - Apr 5, 2014
Bayou Regional	Apr 3 - Apr 5, 2014
Chesapeake Regional	Apr 3 - Apr 5, 2014
Las Vegas Regional	Apr 3 - Apr 5, 2014
Windsor Essex Great Lakes Regional	Apr 3 - Apr 5, 2014
Pine Tree District Event	Apr 4 - Apr 6, 2014
Bedford FIRST Robotics District Competition	Apr 4 - Apr 6, 2014
Lansing FIRST Robotics District Competition	Apr 4 - Apr 6, 2014
Troy FIRST Robotics District Competition	Apr 4 - Apr 6, 2014
New York City Regional	Apr 4 - Apr 6, 2014
PNW FIRST Robotics Oregon State University District Event	Apr 4 - Apr 5, 2014
Lone Star Regional	Apr 4 - Apr 6, 2014

=== Week 7 ===
Event	Dates
Michigan FRC State Championship	Apr 10 - Apr 12, 2014
Mid-Atlantic Robotics FRC Region Championship	Apr 10 - Apr 12, 2014
New England FRC Region Championship	Apr 10 - Apr 12, 2014
Autodesk PNW FRC Championship	Apr 10 - Apr 12, 2014

=== Districts ===
Event	Dates	Week
Center Line FIRST Robotics District Competition	Feb 28th - Mar 1st, 2014	1
Southfield FIRST Robotics District Competition	Feb 28th - Mar 1st, 2014	1
Granite State District Event	Feb 28th - Mar 1st, 2014	1
PNW FIRST Robotics Auburn Mountainview District Event	Feb 28th - Mar 1st, 2014	1
MAR FIRST Robotics Mt. Olive District Competition	Mar 1 - Mar 2, 2014	1
MAR FIRST Robotics Hatboro-Horsham District Competition	Mar 1 - Mar 2, 2014	1
UNH District Event	Mar 6 - Mar 7, 2014	2
Gull Lake FIRST Robotics District Competition	Mar 7 - Mar 8, 2014	2
Kettering University FIRST Robotics District Competition	Mar 7 - Mar 8, 2014	2
PNW FIRST Robotics Oregon City District Event	Mar 7 - Mar 8, 2013	2
PNW FIRST Robotics Glacier Peak District Event	Mar 7 - Mar 8, 2014	2
Groton District Event	Mar 8 - Mar 9, 2014	2
WPI District Event	Mar 13 - Mar 14, 2014	3
Escanaba FIRST Robotics District Competition	Mar 14 - Mar 15, 2014	3
Howell FIRST Robotics District Competition	Mar 14 - Mar 15, 2014	3
MAR FIRST Robotics Springside Chestnut Hill District Competition	Mar 14 - Mar 15, 2014	3
PNW FIRST Robotics Eastern Washington University District Event	Mar 14 - Mar 15, 2014	3
PNW FIRST Robotics Mt. Vernon District Event	Mar 14 - Mar 15, 2014	3
MAR FIRST Robotics Clifton District Competition	Mar 15 - Mar 16, 2014	3
Great Lakes Bay Region FIRST Robotics District Competition	Mar 21 - Mar 22, 2014	4
Traverse City FIRST Robotics District Competition	Mar 21 - Mar 22, 2014	4
West Michigan FIRST Robotics District Competition	Mar 21 - Mar 22, 2014	4
PNW FIRST Robotics Wilsonville District Event	Mar 21 - Mar 22, 2014	4
Rhode Island District Event	Mar 21 - Mar 22, 2014	4
PNW FIRST Robotics Shorewood District Event	Mar 21 - Mar 22, 2014	4
Southington District Event	Mar 22 - Mar 23, 2014	4
MAR FIRST Robotics Lenape-Seneca District Competition	Mar 22 - Mar 23, 2014	4
Northeastern University District Event	Mar 28 - Mar 29, 2014	5
Livonia FIRST Robotics District Competition	Mar 28 - Mar 29, 2014	5
St. Joseph FIRST Robotics District Competition	Mar 28 - Mar 29, 2014	5
Waterford FIRST Robotics District Competition	Mar 28 - Mar 29, 2014	5
PNW FIRST Robotics Auburn District Event	Mar 28 - Mar 29, 2014	5
PNW FIRST Robotics Central Washington University District Event	Mar 28 - Mar 29, 2014	5
Hartford District Event	Mar 29 - Mar 30, 2014	5
MAR FIRST Robotics Bridgewater-Raritan District Competition	Mar 29 - Mar 30, 2014	5
Pine Tree District Event	Apr 4 - Apr 5, 2014	6
Bedford FIRST Robotics District Competition	Apr 4 - Apr 5, 2014	6
Lansing FIRST Robotics District Competition	Apr 4 - Apr 5, 2014	6
Troy FIRST Robotics District Competition	Apr 4 - Apr 5, 2014	6
PNW FIRST Robotics Oregon State University District Event	Apr 4 - Apr 5, 2014	6

=== State/Regional Championships ===
Event	Location	Dates
Autodesk PNW FRC Championship	Portland, Oregon	Apr 10 - Apr 12, 2014
Michigan FRC State Championship	Ypsilanti, Michigan	Apr 10 - Apr 12, 2014
Mid-Atlantic Robotics FRC Region Championship	Bethlehem, Pennsylvania	Apr 10 - Apr 12, 2014
New England FRC Region Championship	Boston, Massachusetts	Apr 10 - Apr 12, 2014

=== World Championship ===
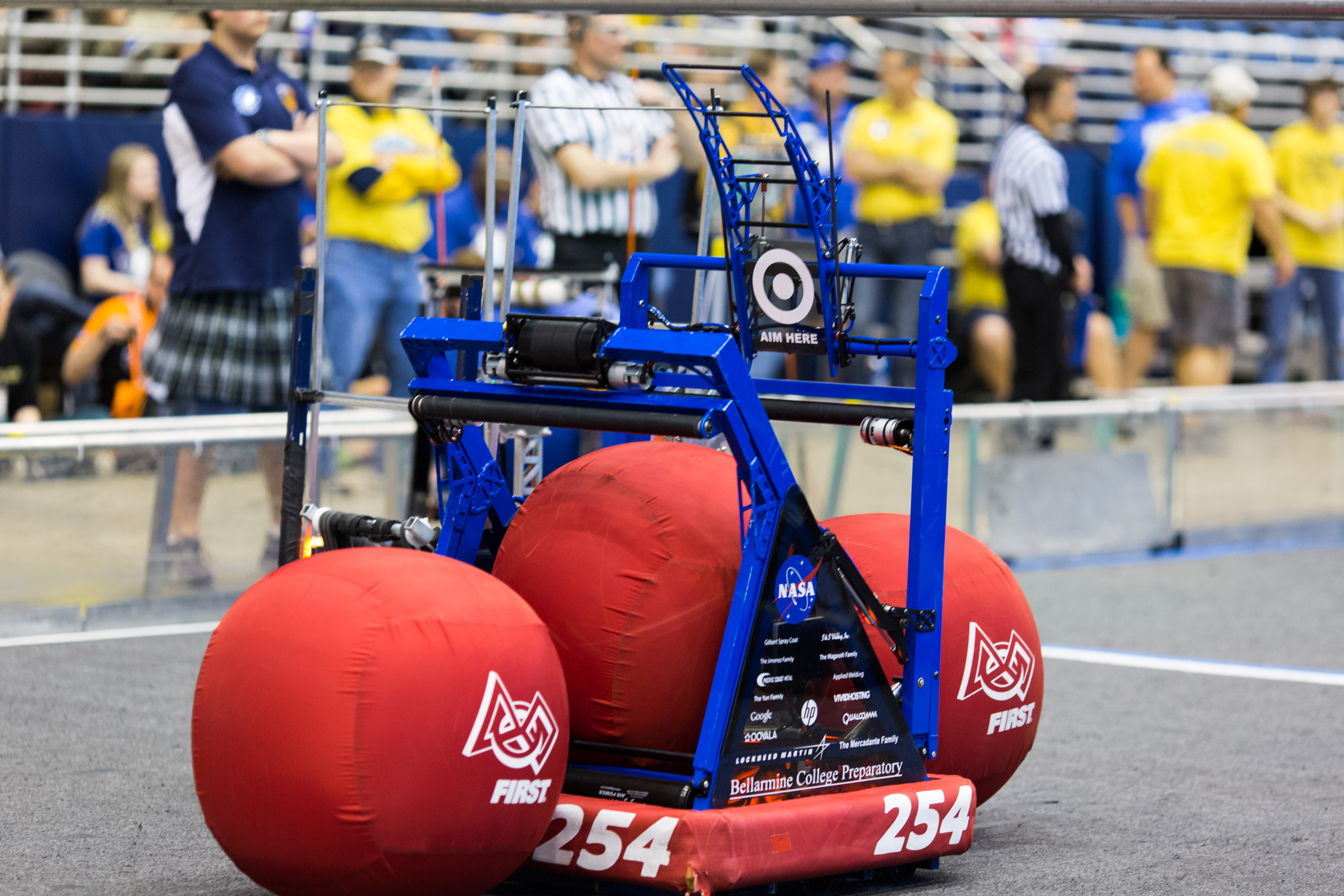
"Barrage", Team 254's 2014 World Champion FRC robot

Event	Location	Dates
FIRST Robotics World Championship	St. Louis, Missouri	Apr 23 - Apr 26, 2014

==== Final Round at Einstein Field ====
Semifinals
(United States) (Canada) 1678 - 1114 - 1640 - 5136	221	220	2W
(United States) 67 - 973 - 2481 - 2363	121	165	0W
(United States) 1477 - 2590 - 1625 - 3467	235	245	0W
(United States) 254 - 469 - 2848 - 74	320	261	2W

Finals
(United States) (Canada) 1678 - 1114 - 1640 - 5136	236	240	250	1W
(United States) 254 - 469 - 2848 - 74	361	153	280	2W
