= Rocky Bridges =

American baseball player (1927–2015)

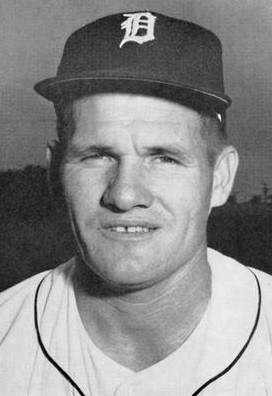
- Bridges in 1959
- Infielder
- Born: August 7, 1927; Refugio, Texas, U.S.
- Died: January 28, 2015 (aged 87); Coeur d'Alene, Idaho, U.S.
- Batted: Right Threw: Right

MLB debut
- April 17, 1951, for the Brooklyn Dodgers

Last MLB appearance
- October 1, 1961, for the Los Angeles Angels

MLB statistics
- Batting average: .247
- Home runs: 16
- Runs batted in: 187
- Stats at Baseball Reference

Teams
- Brooklyn Dodgers (1951–1952); Cincinnati Redlegs (1953–1957); Washington Senators (1957–1958); Detroit Tigers (1959–1960); Cleveland Indians (1960); St. Louis Cardinals (1960); Los Angeles Angels (1961)

Career highlights and awards
- All-Star (1958)

Everett Lamar "Rocky" Bridges (August 7, 1927 – January 28, 2015) was an American middle infielder and third baseman with an 11-year career in Major League Baseball from 1951 to 1961. Bridges played for the Brooklyn Dodgers, Cincinnati Redlegs and St. Louis Cardinals of the National League, and the Washington Senators, Detroit Tigers, Cleveland Indians and Los Angeles Angels of the American League.

== Playing career ==
Bridges was a native Texan who attended Long Beach Polytechnic High School in California. He became a journeyman ball player who made his big-league debut in 1951 with the Brooklyn Dodgers. As a utility infielder, he backed up two future Hall of Famers, Pee Wee Reese and Jackie Robinson and as a result, saw little playing time.

Subsequently, he was traded to Cincinnati Redlegs (as the Reds were known in the mid-1950s) and then eventually to the last place Washington Senators, where he obtained a starting position as a shortstop. In 1958, his first full season with the Senators, he was selected by New York Yankees manager Casey Stengel to the 1958 Major League Baseball All-Star Game, one of the few highlights of his career. Bridges career continued until 1961, playing for several American League teams. His final career batting average was.247 with 16 home runs. Despite his unimpressive career statistics, Bridges became a well known and respected ball player because of his hard work, hustle, spirit, and sense of humor. In 1964, Sports Illustrated described him as "...one of the best stand up comics in the history of baseball." Among his most famous quotes:

"It took me that long to learn how to spell it." -- after being traded from Cincinnati, where he played for four years.

"That surprised everybody. They were close to launching an investigation." -- after being selected to the 1958 All-Star Team.

"I'm in the twilight of a mediocre career ....I've had more numbers on my back than a bingo board." --- after being traded to the Detroit Tigers.

== Coaching career ==
Following his active playing career, he served two terms (1962–63; 1968–71) as the third base coach of the Angels and one year (1985) in that role with the San Francisco Giants. Bridges also had a long career as a minor league manager in the Angels, Giants, San Diego Padres and Pittsburgh Pirates organizations. Over 21 seasons stretched between 1964 and 1989, Bridges' teams won 1,300 games and lost 1,358 (.489). His minor league managerial career is profiled in Jim Bouton's collection of baseball articles and essays entitled I Managed Good, But Boy Did They Play Bad. Bridges also managed the Leones de Ponce to the pennant title of the Puerto Rico Baseball League in the 1968–69 season.

== Legacy ==
The title of Bouton's book was reportedly based on a quote from Bridges.

"Rocky Bridges looked like a ballplayer. In fact, he may have looked more like a ballplayer than any other ballplayer who ever lived." --The Great American Baseball Card Flipping, Trading and Bubble Gum Book

"Rocky Bridges undoubtedly has been one of the most popular men ever to wear the Washington uniform. He's an example of what 'hustle', 'desire', and 'spirit' will do." -- Washington Post sports columnist Bob Addie, 1958

Bridges died of natural causes January 27, 2015, aged 87, in Coeur d'Alene, Idaho.

Preceded by Red Kress	Los Angeles Angels third base coach 1962–1963	Succeeded by Salty Parker
Preceded by Billy Herman	California Angels third base coach 1968–1971	Succeeded by Peanuts Lowrey
