= Ultimate Ascent =

2013 FIRST Robotics Competition game

- Year: 2013

Season Information
- Number of teams: 2,524
- Number of regionals: 60 (including MI and MAR championships)
- Number of district events: 17
- Championship location: Edward Jones Dome, St Louis, Missouri

FIRST Championship Awards
- Chairman's Award winner: Team 1538 - "The Holy Cows"
- Woodie Flowers Award winner: Faridodin Lajvardi - Team 842
- Founder's Award winner: Rockwell Automation
- Gracious Professionalism Winner: Team 3138 - "Innovators Robotics"
- Champions: Team 1241 - "THEORY6"; Team 1477 - "Texas Torque"; Team 610 - "The Coyotes"

Links
- Website: https://www.firstinspires.org/robotics/frc

Ultimate Ascent was the 2013 FIRST Robotics Competition game. It is styled similarly to disc golf.

== Kickoff ==
The Kickoff event was held on January 5, 2013. Speakers included Dean Kamen, Woodie Flowers and John Grunsfeld. It was broadcast on NASA TV beginning at 10:30 EST.

== Rules ==
=== Alliances ===
Ultimate Ascent is played with two alliances: one red and one blue. Each alliance has three teams. During the qualification rounds at competition the matches are generated such that teams do not play two matches too quickly or compete with or against another team too often. Elimination alliances are then selected in a two-round serpentine draft by the top eight seeded teams before the elimination rounds. Each team's robot can be identified by its bumpers which must have the team's number visible from any side of the robot. The bumpers are also colored to match the alliance that the robot is on. The winning alliance is determined by the team with the most points at the conclusion of the match.

=== Field ===
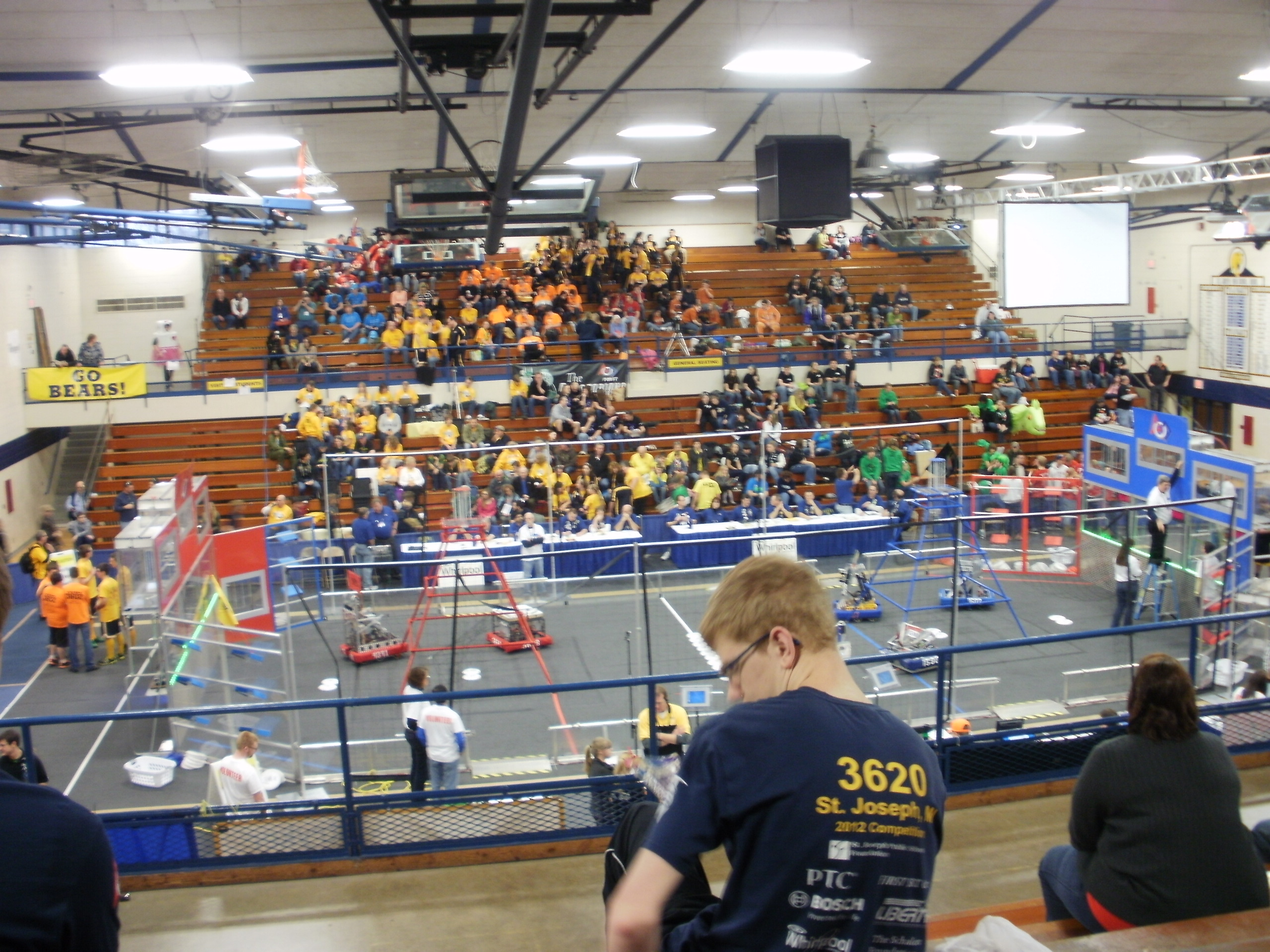
Ultimate Ascent field

Ultimate Ascent is played on a 27' x 54' field. There are two pyramids placed in the center of each half of the field. There are five scoring locations on the opposite end of the field from the alliance station where that team's drivers are. Four of the goals are located on the opposing alliance's wall. The fifth is part of the pyramid at that end of the field.

=== Matches ===
Video of a finals match at the St. Joseph district. The actual match begins around 4:54.

Ultimate Ascent matches are two minutes and fifteen seconds long. The first fifteen seconds are called the autonomous period. During this period the robots follow a set of pre-programmed instructions. Following this period the teams take control for the teleoperated period. Drivers control their robots, attempting to score discs into the goals at the opposite end of the playing field. The robots also can climb their alliance's pyramid at the end of the match to score additional points. In the final thirty seconds the human players can throw their six colored discs into play over the alliance wall.

=== Scoring ===
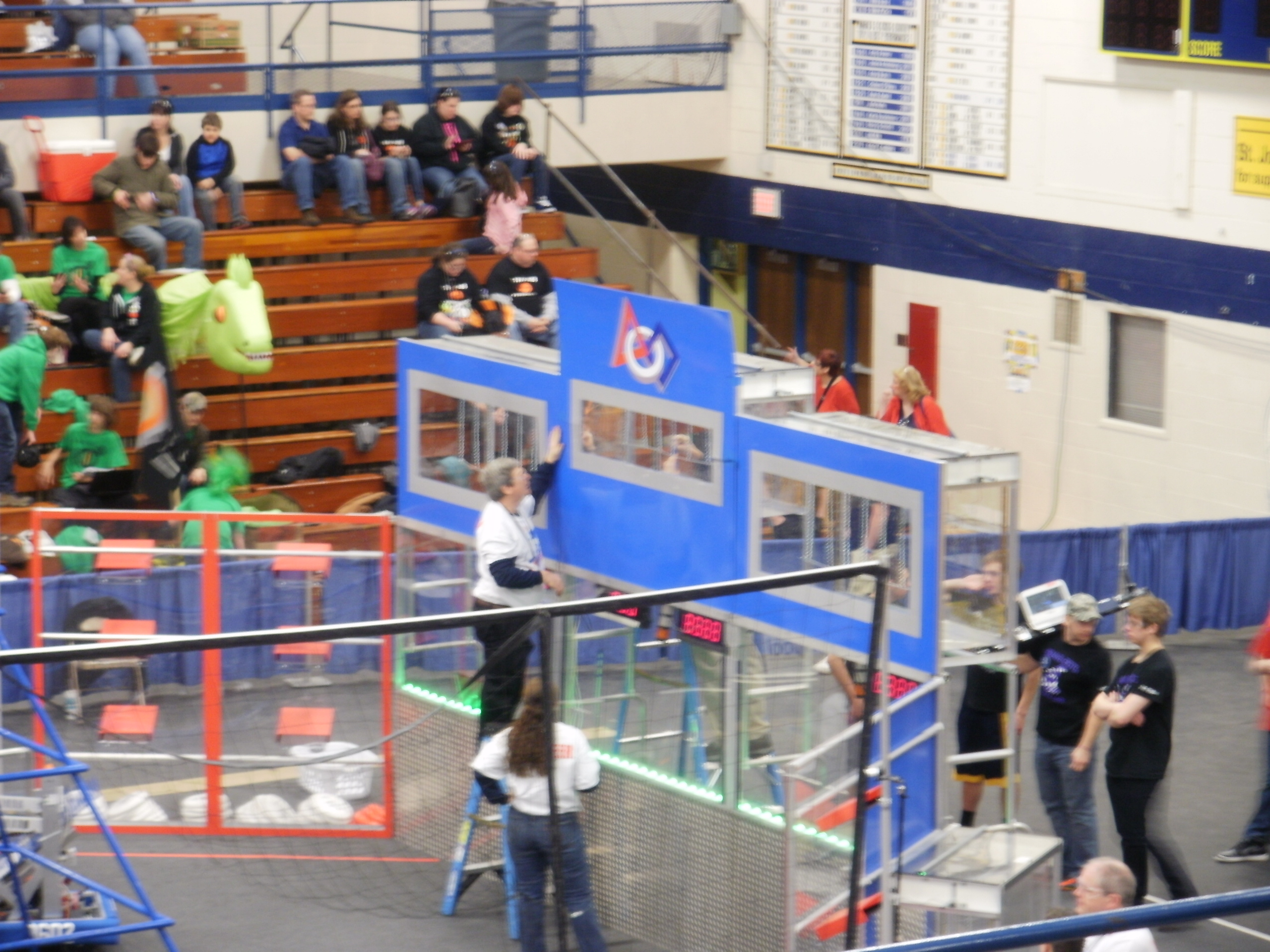
Middle and high goals for the blue alliance

Teams start with up to 2 or 3 discs on the robot at the beginning of the match. Robots which begin touching the carpet behind their colored Auto Line may have three discs; others may have only two. They can score these in autonomous or wait for the teleoperated period. Only the 6 discs of an alliance's color count when scored on top of its pyramid. White or opposing colored discs will not count if scored in the pyramid. Since the human players may not put any colored discs in play until teleoperated, scoring in the pyramid is not possible in autonomous. Teams can score points as follows by scoring discs into goals:

Goal	Autonomous	Teleop
Low Goal	2	1
Middle Goal	4	2
High Goal	6	3
Pyramid Goal	N/A	5

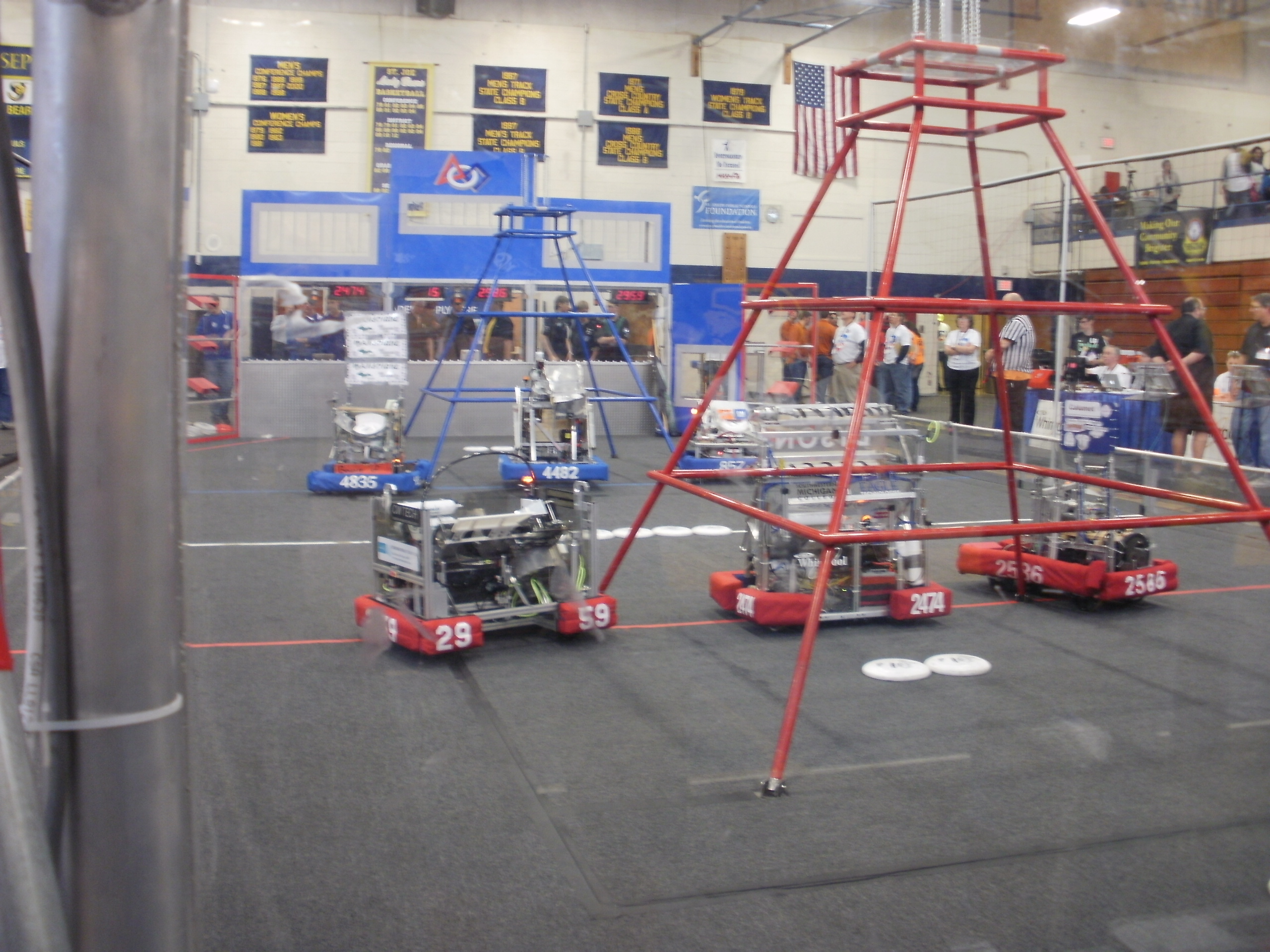
View from the driver station, showing the pyramids

The match ends with robots attempting to climb pyramid game elements located on the field. Robots earn points by climbing the pyramid based on how high they climb. Levels are divided by the horizontal bars on the pyramid, with from the ground to the first bar being level 1. The following is the breakdown of the scoring:

Level	Points
1	10
2	20
3	30

=== Robots ===
Robots must not exceed a perimeter of 112 inches, never exceed 84 inches in height, and not exceed 60 inches in height when outside their auto zone (the area in front of and including their colored auto line). During game play the robot can not exceed a 54 in diameter cylinder. Not including the battery and protective bumpers, the robot cannot exceed a weight of 120 pounds.

== Events ==
=== Week 1 ===
Event	Dates
BAE Systems Granite State Regional	Feb 28 – March 2, 2013
Finger Lakes Regional	Feb 28 – March 2, 2013
Palmetto Regional	Feb 28 – March 2, 2013
Hub City Regional	Feb 28 – March 2, 2013
Central Valley Regional	Mar 1 – 3, 2013
Kettering University FIRST Robotics District Competition	Mar 1 – 2, 2013
Traverse City FIRST Robotics District Competition	Mar 1 – 2, 2013
Hatboro-Horsham FIRST Robotics District Competition	Mar 2 – 3, 2013

=== Week 2 ===
Event	Dates
San Diego Regional	Mar 7 – 9, 2013
Orlando Regional	Mar 7 – 9, 2013
WPI Regional	Mar 7 – 9, 2013
Lake Superior Regional	Mar 7 – 9, 2013
Northern Lights Regional	Mar 7 – 9, 2013
New York City Regional	Mar 7 – 9, 2013
Greater Toronto East Regional	Mar 7 – 9, 2013
Autodesk Oregon Regional	Mar 7 – 9, 2013
Lone Star Regional	Mar 7 – 9, 2013
Gull Lake FIRST Robotics District Competition	Mar 8 – 9, 2013
Waterford FIRST Robotics District Competition	Mar 8 – 9, 2013
Israel Regional	Mar 10 – 12, 2013

=== Week 3 ===
Event	Dates
Peachtree Regional	Mar 14 – 16, 2013
Boilermaker Regional	Mar 14 – 16, 2013
Greater Kansas City Regional	Mar 14 – 16, 2013
St. Louis Regional	Mar 14 – 16, 2013
North Carolina Regional	Mar 14 – 16, 2013
Pittsburgh Regional	Mar 14 – 16, 2013
Festival de Robotique FRC a Montreal Regional	Mar 14 – 16, 2013
Virginia Regional	Mar 14 – 16, 2013
Detroit FIRST Robotics District Competition	Mar 15 – 16, 2013
St Joseph FIRST Robotics District Competition	Mar 15 – 16, 2013
TCNJ FIRST Robotics District Competition	Mar 15 – 16, 2013
Springside - Chestnut Hill FIRST Robotics District Competition	Mar 15 – 16, 2013

=== Week 4 ===
Event	Dates
Phoenix Regional	Mar 21 – 23, 2013
Los Angeles Regional	Mar 21 – 23, 2013
Sacramento Regional	Mar 21 – 23, 2013
Bayou Regional	Mar 21 – 23, 2013
Boston Regional	Mar 21 – 23, 2013
Queen City Regional	Mar 21 – 23, 2013
Waterloo Regional	Mar 21 – 23, 2013
Dallas Regional	Mar 21 – 23, 2013
Utah Regional sponsored by NASA	Mar 21 – 23, 2013
Central Washington Regional	Mar 21 – 23, 2013
Wisconsin Regional	Mar 21 – 23, 2013
Grand Blanc FIRST Robotics District Competition	Mar 22 – 23, 2013
West Michigan FIRST Robotics District Competition	Mar 22 – 23, 2013
Mount Olive FIRST Robotics District Competition	Mar 23 – 24, 2013
Lenape Seneca FIRST Robotics District Competition	Mar 23 – 24, 2013

=== Week 5 ===
Event	Dates
Inland Empire Regional	Mar 28 – 30, 2013
Connecticut Regional sponsored by UTC	Mar 28 – 30, 2013
Washington DC Regional	Mar 28 – 30, 2013
Minnesota 10000 Lakes Regional	Mar 28 – 30, 2013
Minnesota North Star Regional	Mar 28 – 30, 2013
Buckeye Regional	Mar 28 – 30, 2013
Oklahoma Regional	Mar 28 – 30, 2013
Greater Toronto West Regional	Mar 28 – 30, 2013
Smoky Mountains Regional	Mar 28 – 30, 2013
Alamo Regional sponsored by Rackspace Hosting	Mar 28 – 30, 2013
Seattle Regional	Mar 28 – 30, 2013
Livonia FIRST Robotics District Competition	Mar 29 – 30, 2013
Troy FIRST Robotics District Competition	Mar 29 – 30, 2013

=== Week 6 ===
Event	Dates
Western Canadian FRC Regional	Apr 4 – 6, 2013
Razorback Regional	Apr 4 – 6, 2013
Silicon Valley Regional	Apr 4 – 6, 2013
Colorado Regional	Apr 4 – 6, 2013
Hawaii Regional sponsored by BAE Systems	Apr 4 – 6, 2013
Midwest Regional	Apr 4 – 6, 2013
Crossroads Regional	Apr 4 – 6, 2013
Pine Tree Regional	Apr 4 – 6, 2013
Las Vegas Regional	Apr 4 – 6, 2013
SBPLI Long Island Regional	Apr 4 – 6, 2013
Spokane Regional	Apr 4 – 6, 2013
Bedford FIRST Robotics District Competition	Apr 5 – 6, 2013
Bridgewater-Raritan FIRST Robotics District Competition	Apr 6 – 7, 2013

=== Week 7 ===
Event	Dates
Chesapeake Regional	Apr 11 – 13, 2013
Michigan FRC State Championship	Apr 11 – 13, 2013
Mid-Atlantic Robotics FRC Region Championship	Apr 11 – 13, 2013

=== Districts ===
Event	Dates	Week
Kettering University FIRST Robotics District Competition	Mar 1 – 2, 2013	1
Traverse City FIRST Robotics District Competition	Mar 1 – 2, 2013	1
Hatboro-Horsham FIRST Robotics District Competition	Mar 2 – 3, 2013	1
Gull Lake FIRST Robotics District Competition	Mar 8 – 9, 2013	2
Waterford FIRST Robotics District Competition	Mar 8 – 9, 2013	2
Detroit FIRST Robotics District Competition	Mar 15 – 16, 2013	3
St Joseph FIRST Robotics District Competition	Mar 15 – 16, 2013	3
TCNJ FIRST Robotics District Competition	Mar 15 – 16, 2013	3
Springside - Chestnut Hill FIRST Robotics District Competition	Mar 15 – 16, 2013	3
Grand Blanc FIRST Robotics District Competition	Mar 22 – 23, 2013	4
West Michigan FIRST Robotics District Competition	Mar 22 – 23, 2013	4
Mount Olive FIRST Robotics District Competition	Mar 23 – 24, 2013	4
Lenape Seneca FIRST Robotics District Competition	Mar 23 – 24, 2013	4
Livonia FIRST Robotics District Competition	Mar 29 – 30, 2013	5
Troy FIRST Robotics District Competition	Mar 29 – 30, 2013	5
Bedford FIRST Robotics District Competition	Apr 5 – 6, 2013	6
Bridgewater-Raritan FIRST Robotics District Competition	Apr 6 – 7, 2013	6

=== State/Regional Championships ===
Event	Dates	Week
Michigan FRC State Championship	Apr 11 – 13, 2013	7
Mid-Atlantic Robotics FRC Region Championship	Apr 11 – 13, 2013	7

=== World Championship ===
Event	Location	Dates
FIRST Robotics World Championship	St. Louis, Missouri	Apr 24 – 27, 2013

==== Final Round at Einstein Field ====
Semifinals
(United States) 469 - 1519 - 33	201	186	152	2W
(United States) 1678 - 862 - 148	233	127	136	1W
(Canada) (United States) 1477 - 610 - 1241	176	225	224	2W
(United States) 3476 - 303 - 1640	199	200	192	1W

Finals
(United States) 469 - 1519 - 33	200	195	164	1W
(Canada) (United States) 1477 - 610 - 1241	184	210	191	2W
