= Lishu =

Lishu or Li Shu may refer to:

- Li Shu (Tang dynasty) (740-791), a Tang dynasty prince
- Li Shu (mechanical engineer)
- Lishu County, in Jilin, China
- Lishu District, in Jixi, Heilongjiang, China
- Lishu station, Suzhou Rail Transit, China
- Clerical script or lishu, a style of Chinese calligraphy

== See also ==
- Li Su (disambiguation)
