= Ball Four (TV series) =

- Jim Bouton (left) as Jim Barton and Ben Davidson as 'Rhino' Rhinelander in the pilot episode
- Genre: Sitcom
- Based on: Ball Four by Jim Bouton
- Developed by: Jim Bouton; Marvin Kitman; Vic Ziegel
- Starring: Jim Bouton; Ben Davidson
- Country of origin: United States
- Original language: English
- No. of seasons: 1
- No. of episodes: 7 (2 unaired)

Production
- Running time: 30 minutes
- Production company: Time-Life Television

Original release
- Network: CBS
- Release: September 22 – October 27, 1976

Ball Four is an American sitcom that aired on CBS in 1976. The series is inspired by the 1970 book of the same name by Jim Bouton. Bouton co-created the show with humorist and television critic Marvin Kitman and sportswriter Vic Ziegel. Bouton also starred in the series.

== Premise ==
Ball Four followed the Washington Americans, a fictitious minor league baseball team, dealing with the fallout from a series of Sports Illustrated articles written by Americans player Jim Barton (Bouton). Like the book, the series covered controversial subjects including womanizing players, drug use, homosexuality in sports, and religion. The series included a gay rookie ballplayer, one of the earliest regular gay characters on television. The trio began developing the series in 1975, looking to other series like M*A*S*H and All in the Family as models. CBS expressed interest and the creative team developed a script. CBS shot the pilot episode and ultimately bought the series.

Ball Four aired at 8:30 PM Eastern time, which was during the Family Viewing Hour, an FCC-mandated hour of early evening "family-friendly" broadcasting. Consequently, the writers had some trouble with the network's Standards and Practices in their attempt to portray realistic locker room scenes, especially the language used by the players. Pseudo-profanity such as "bullpimp" was disallowed, while "horse-crock" and "bullhorse" were approved.

Ball Four debuted on September 22. While Bouton and other members of the cast received praise for their performances, critics found the series uneven in quality. CBS canceled the show after five episodes.

== Cast ==
- Jim Bouton as Jim Barton
- Jack Somack as 'Cap' Capogrosso
- David James Carroll as Bill Westlake
- Ben Davidson as 'Rhino' Rhinelander
- Bill McCutcheon as Coach Pinky Pinkney
- Lenny Schultz as Lenny 'Birdman' Siegel
- Marco St. John as Rayford Plunkett
- Jaime Tirelli as Orlando Lopez
- Samuel E. Wright as C. B. Travis

== Episodes ==
No.	Title	Directed by	Written by	Original release date
1	"Work in Progress"	Jay Sandrich	Greg Antonacci and Marvin Kitman	September 22, 1976
2	"The Unpractical Joke"	Unknown	Unknown	September 29, 1976
3	"High-Flying Rookie"	Unknown	Unknown	October 13, 1976
4	"A Quiet Day at the Iroquois Hotel"	Unknown	Unknown	October 20, 1976
5	"What's a Nice Watch Like You Doing in a Place Like This?"	Unknown	Unknown	October 27, 1976
6	"Rookie in Love"	N/A	N/A	Unaired
7	"Closet-Phobia"	N/A	N/A	Unaired
