= Mel Durslag =

American sportswriter (1921–2016)

- Born: April 29, 1921
- Died: July 17, 2016 (aged 95); Santa Monica, California
- Occupation: Sportswriter

Melvin Durslag (April 29, 1921 – July 17, 2016) was an American sportswriter.

Durslag began writing for the Los Angeles Herald-Express in 1939, while he was a senior at Los Angeles High School, and joined the staff full-time in 1940, while he was a freshman at the University of Southern California. He wrote a sports column for Hearst papers in Los Angeles beginning in 1952 and had a long career at the Los Angeles Herald-Examiner. In 1989, after the Herald-Examiner went out of business, he joined the Los Angeles Times. He retired in 1991. Durslag contributed an essay on Walter Alston to I Managed Good, But Boy Did They Play Bad.

He also wrote a column for many years for TV Guide.

Durslag was elected into the National Sportscasters and Sportswriters Association Hall of Fame in 1995. In 2000 he was inducted into the Southern California Jewish Sports Hall of Fame. He was named a finalist for the J. G. Taylor Spink Award in the 2014 balloting.

Durslag died after a brief illness on July 17, 2016, at Berkley East Convalescent Hospital in Santa Monica, California.
