= Discover: The World of Science =

- Presented by: Peter Graves
- Narrated by: Peter Graves
- Country of origin: United States
- Original language: English

Production
- Production company: Chedd-Angier Productions

Original release
- Network: PBS
- Release: 1983 – 1990

Discover: The World of Science is an American television show that ran between 1983 and 1990.

Actor Peter Graves is the on-camera host and narrator of Discover: The World of Science, a monthly, one-hour magazine-style television series which provides a human perspective on new developments in robots, science, technology, medicine, the environment, behavior and natural history. The series was typically broadcast on Wednesday evenings at 8 PM on PBS. The series, with early episodes being underwritten by Atari and later episodes being underwritten by GTE, was produced by Chedd-Angier Productions in association with Discover Magazine.

Peter Graves hosted 24 episodes of the series. Chedd-Angier succeeded this show with Scientific American Frontiers.

The series was periodically spoofed on Saturday Night Live with comedian Phil Hartman portraying Peter Graves.

== List of known episodes ==
Episode	Description	Aired Date	Sponsor
101	Patricia Cowlings discusses her work on "space sickness" using biofeedback techniques. Other stories include Archie Carr's work with sea turtles, two youngster's fight against childhood leukemia, new advancements in police training, and competition among M.I.T. students with their homemade robots.		
	Mount St. Helens	January 10, 1983, 8 PM	Atari
104	The first segment shows how a cochlear implant affected Dennis Dale and other recipients. Other segments focus on adult-child communication, a totally computerized helicopter simulator, the eruption of Mount St. Helens, and Ditch Day at Caltech.		
201	Wild Horses		
202	Sue Ferguson travels to mountains in Utah talking about predicting avalanches. Follow an airline crew on a NASA flight simulator. Discover whether the test to determine if unborn babies have cystic fibrosis is foolproof. Archie Carr discusses sea turtles' homing ability.		
301	Manatees, Bionics, Solar-powered Car Race and Meditation	February 4, 1987, 8 PM	GTE
503	Building a faster boat, Iguanas of Belize, Secrets of hibernating bears, Aliens of the deep, A Computerized interpreter for the deaf-blind		GTE
505	Stuttering, Returning caribou to Maine, Herbert the robot, Dogs in forensic research, How kids think		GTE
1	New species of life on the floor of the Pacific, High-tech crime-solving methods, The World's first human-powered helicopter, Returning the red wolf to the wild		GTE
2	Understanding and preventing heart attacks, Racing iguanas in the Galapagos Islands, Determining how kids think, Annual MIT student engineering competition		GTE
3	The Great Barrier Reef, unique animal inhabitants, robot sheep-shearers, boomerang aero-dynamics and more		GTE
4	The Guam rail, Microwavable ice cream, Shyness, Balloon Valvuloplasty		GTE
5	A Computerized interpreter for the blind, Discovering dinosaurs, Musical accompanist, Dolphin communication, The Nature of lightning		GTE
	New advances in the fascinating field of robotic hands, and travels to Nova Scotia to study fossils linked to The Great Extinction.	January 7, 1987, 8 PM	GTE
	Development of a rabies vaccine for raccoons and other animals in the wild.	February 4, 1987, 8 PM	GTE
	Caring For The Caribou	March 21, 1989, 8 PM	GTE
	Hedgehog Haven	January 3, 1990, 8 PM	
	Samuel Fletcher's visual speech technology		GTE
