= Joe Schultz Jr. =

American baseball player, coach, and manager (1918–1996)

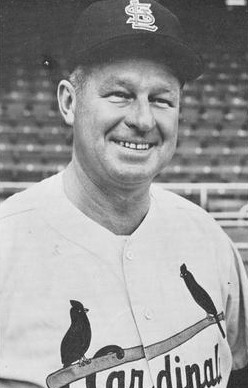
- Schultz Jr. in 1965
- Catcher / Coach / Manager
- Born: August 29, 1918; Chicago, Illinois, U.S.
- Died: January 10, 1996 (aged 77); St. Louis, Missouri, U.S.
- Batted: Left Threw: Right

MLB debut
- September 27, 1939, for the Pittsburgh Pirates

Last MLB appearance
- September 23, 1948, for the St. Louis Browns

MLB statistics
- Batting average: .259
- Home runs: 1
- Runs batted in: 46
- Managerial record: 78–112
- Winning %: .411
- Stats at Baseball Reference

Teams
- As player: Pittsburgh Pirates (1939–1941); St. Louis Browns (1943–1948); As manager: Seattle Pilots (1969); Detroit Tigers (1973); As coach: St. Louis Browns (1949); St. Louis Cardinals (1963–1968); Kansas City Royals (1970); Detroit Tigers (1971–1976)

Career highlights and awards
- 2× World Series champion (1964, 1967)

Joseph Charles Schultz Jr. (August 29, 1918 – January 10, 1996) was an American Major League Baseball catcher, coach, and manager. Schultz was the first and only manager for the Seattle Pilots franchise during their lone season before they became the Milwaukee Brewers. Seattle entered the American League as an expansion franchise in 1969, and moved to Wisconsin shortly before the following season.

== Playing career ==
Born in Chicago, he was the son of a major league baseball player—Joe (Germany) Schultz, an outfielder who played for seven of the eight National League clubs (1912–16; 1919–25) and who later became a manager in the St. Louis Cardinals' extensive farm system. In 1932, at age 13, Joe Jr. appeared in his first professional game, as a pinch hitter for the Houston Buffaloes of the Class A Texas League; the elder Schultz was managing Houston and Joe Jr. was serving as the Buffaloes' batboy that season.

Joe Jr. batted left-handed and threw right-handed; he was listed as 5 feet 11 inches (1.80 m) tall and 180 pounds (82 kg). He had a distinguished prep career at St. Louis University High School and signed his first contract with the Cardinals in 1936, but was drafted by the Pittsburgh Pirates, where his father had become minor league director, after the 1939 season. After appearing in only 22 games for Pittsburgh between 1939 and 1941, Schultz made his way back to St. Louis with the Browns of the American League, where he spent six seasons (1943–48) as a backup catcher and pinch hitter. In 328 major-league at bats over all or parts of nine MLB seasons, Schultz batted .259 with 85 hits, 13 doubles and one home run, struck as a pinch hitter against Pete Gebrian of the Chicago White Sox at Comiskey Park on August 11, 1947.

== Coach for Browns and Cardinals ==
In 1949, Schultz served as a coach with the Browns, and then he managed in the minor leagues from 1950 to 1962, returning to the Cardinals' organization in 1958.

He became a Cardinals coach in 1963 and worked with three National League pennant winners (1964, 1967 and 1968), and two world championship clubs (1964, 1967) through 1968.

== Manager for Seattle Pilots ==
The success of the Cardinals led to Schultz's 1969 opportunity with the Pilots. Although they were badly outdrafted by their fellow expansion team, the Kansas City Royals, during the player selection lottery, Schultz and general manager Marvin Milkes actually thought the Pilots would finish third in the newly formed American League West. Indeed, Schultz managed to keep his patchwork team within striking distance of .500 for most of the early part of the season. However, a 9–20 July effectively ended any chance at respectability, and the Pilots finished last in the new West, with a mark of 64–98 (.395).

However, it can be argued that Schultz's efforts were hamstrung by the Pilots' off-the-field problems. They played at Sick's Stadium, an aging minor league park that was clearly inadequate even as a temporary facility. The Pilots were also plagued by an unstable, undercapitalized ownership; they were nearly broke by the end of the season.

Schultz was relieved of his duties as manager in mid-November, and was replaced by Dave Bristol as the team struggled in limbo during the 1969–70 offseason. Only weeks before the 1970 season opener, the Pilots were purchased by a group headed by Bud Selig and transferred to Milwaukee, where they have remained since.

The Pilots' year of existence was immortalized in Ball Four, the best-selling, controversial memoir of the 1969 season by Seattle pitcher Jim Bouton that was published in 1970. Bouton tells humorous anecdotes about Schultz and some of the motivational speeches he gave to the Pilots. According to Bouton, Schultz's speeches were heavily laced with profanity, even with some original curses (his favorites being the seemingly interchangeable and used for all occasions: "shitfuck" and "fuckshit"). The author claims that Schultz was well liked by his team, but some of his choices were questioned by the players. In a May 28 game against the Baltimore Orioles, he accidentally gave the umpire the wrong lineup card, which came to backfire when opposing manager Earl Weaver noticed they were batting out of order. In a later anthology on managers Bouton edited, I Managed Good, But Boy Did They Play Bad, Bouton noted Schultz's sense of humor and added that, given the circumstances of the last-place team, "I couldn't have had a better manager than Joe Schultz."

== Remainder of career ==
Schultz coached with the Royals (1970) and the Detroit Tigers (1971–76) before leaving baseball.

After Billy Martin was fired with 28 games left in the 1973 season, Schultz took over as interim manager for Detroit for the rest of the way, compiling a mark of 14–14. Counting his interim stint with the Tigers, he had a career record of 78–112 (.411) as a major league skipper. Apart from that assignment, Schultz never managed in the majors again after the Pilots collapsed.

== Death ==
Schultz died in St. Louis, Missouri, at the age of 77, and is interred at Calvary Cemetery in St. Louis.

== See also ==
- List of second-generation Major League Baseball players
- List of St. Louis Cardinals coaches

Sporting positions
Preceded by Harry Walker	St. Louis Cardinals first-base coach 1963–1964	Succeeded by Mickey Vernon
Preceded by Vern Benson	St. Louis Cardinals third-base coach 1965–1968	Succeeded by George Kissell
Preceded by Jo-Jo White	Kansas City Royals third-base coach 1970	Succeeded by George Strickland
Preceded by Grover Resinger	Detroit Tigers third-base coach 1971–1976	Succeeded by Fred Hatfield
