= Bob Guccione Jr. =

Publisher and founder of Spin and Gear magazines

- Born: Robert Charles Guccione Jr. September 19, 1955 (age 71); New York City, U.S.
- Occupations: Magazine editor, publisher, founder of Spin and Gear magazines
- Years active: 1978–present
- Spouse: Kimberlin Grace Brown (m. 2001)

Robert Charles Guccione Jr. (born September 19, 1955) is an American publisher and the eldest son of late Penthouse founder Bob Guccione. He founded the music magazine Spin.

== Publishing career ==
In 1978, after two attempts at going into the publishing business on his own, the young, London-raised Guccione went to work for Penthouse publisher General Media International, a company owned by his father, Penthouse founder Bob Guccione. By the early 1980s, at which time he was running the marketing and circulation department, he left the company (and purported position as heir apparent) to once again attempt to establish his own brand.

=== Launching of Spin magazine (1985) ===
In 1985, with a loan from his father, he launched Spin. In 1987, his father abruptly shut down the magazine after General Media experienced a financial dip which resulted in a long-lasting estrangement between the two. This estrangement ended a few years prior to the elder Guccione's death on October 20, 2010. The younger Guccione found new investors and relaunched Spin in late 1987. He managed to gather most of the magazine's old staff, and missed only one month of publication.

In 1996, Guccione and Spin were sued for sexual harassment and discrimination by Staci Bonner, a former fact-checker for the magazine. Guccione was cleared of the harassment charges, but found liable for promoting a hostile work environment and not paying Bonner comparably to a man with a comparable job position.

Guccione sold Spin to Vibe in 1997, and shortly thereafter founded Gear, which published until 2003. In 2005, science magazine Discover was purchased from Disney Publishing and Guccione formed Discover Media, LLC to publish the magazine. In 2007, Guccione was ousted as CEO, in what was described by the New York Post as "a falling-out over philosophical differences with his financial backers about how to run the company."

=== Gear magazine (1998–2003) ===
Gear was launched and published in the United Kingdom devoted chiefly to revealing pictorials of popular singers, B-movie actresses, and models, along with articles on gadgets, cars, fashion, guy tales of sex, and sports.

Gear debuted in September 1998, with actress Peta Wilson on the cover. The magazine established itself with several publishing stunts such as publishing a nude photo of soccer player Brandi Chastain. The publication, which reached a peak circulation of 500,000 copies sold in 2001, discontinued publication in 2003.

==== Jessica Biel controversy ====
Gear reached its exposure apogee in 2000 when it featured a risqué pictorial of then-17-year-old actress Jessica Biel, who posed while appearing on the WB family drama series 7th Heaven. A controversy arose when 7th Heaven castmate Stephen Collins, who played her father on the series, described the pictures as "child pornography". Collins later admitted to three counts of child abuse. Others, including A.J. Jacobs writing in Esquire, praised it as a brave move by Biel.
