= Leonard Shecter =

American journalist and author

- Born: September 5, 1926; New York City, US
- Died: January 19, 1974 (aged 47); New York City, US
- Education: New York University
- Occupations: Journalist, author
- Known for: Ball Four

Leonard Shecter (September 5, 1926 – January 19, 1974) was an American journalist and author. He edited Jim Bouton's groundbreaking Ball Four, as well as its sequel, I'm Glad You Didn't Take It Personally.

== Journalism career ==
Shecter worked as a sports journalist for the New York Post. While traveling with the New York Yankees, in 1958, Shecter told his editors about a minor altercation between the coach Ralph Houk and the pitcher Ryne Duren; the subsequent published story, printed without a byline, was among the first in sports journalism to provide a behind-the-scenes look at professional sports team squabbles.

Shecter also wrote for Look, The New York Times, and Esquire, where he published a famous profile of Vince Lombardi.

== Literary career ==
Shecter's first book was a paperback biography of Roger Maris. It was a positive portrayal of the ballplayer, although Maris was upset that it was written without being authorized. Once Upon a Time: The Early Years of the New York Mets covered the Mets' 1962 and 1963 seasons.

Shecter, who knew Jim Bouton during the pitcher's Yankees days, suggested that Bouton keep a diary of his 1969 season. The diary, edited by Shecter, became Ball Four. Shecter, in part, wanted to provide an alternative to books such as Jim Brosnan's The Long Season, which Shecter considered a sanitized version of baseball life. Baseball Commissioner Bowie Kuhn tried to get Bouton to blame the contentious book on Shecter.

On the Pad, written with William Phillips, was an exposé on police corruption; Phillips had appeared before the Knapp Commission.

== Critical reception ==
Kirkus Reviews called The Jocks a "wicked, funny, and often startling expose of the games played off the field and the scores that never get posted."

== Death ==
Shecter died on January, 19, 1974, from leukemia.

== Bibliography ==
- Roger Maris: Home Run Hero (1961)
- Once Upon a Time: The Early Years of the New York Mets (1969)
- The Jocks (1969)
- Once Upon the Polo Grounds: The Mets That Were (1970)
- Ball Four, with Jim Bouton (1970)
- I'm Glad You Didn't Take It Personally, with Jim Bouton (1971)
- On the Pad: The Underworld and Its Corrupt Police, Confessions of a Cop on the Take, with William Phillips (1973)
