= Scientific American Frontiers =

American documentary television series

- Genre: Documentary
- Presented by: Woodie Flowers (1990–1993); Alan Alda (1993–2005)
- Country of origin: United States
- Original language: English
- No. of seasons: 15
- No. of episodes: 96

Production
- Production company: Chedd-Angier Production Company

Original release
- Network: PBS
- Release: October 1, 1990 – April 13, 2005

Scientific American Frontiers is an American documentary television series that aired on PBS from October 1, 1990, to April 13, 2005. The show is a companion program to the Scientific American magazine, and primarily covers new technology and discoveries in science and medicine. The Chedd-Angier Production Company, which had recently produced Discover: The World of Science, produced the show for PBS. Frontiers typically aired once every two to four weeks.

== Hosts ==
The show premiered on October 1, 1990, with MIT professor Woodie Flowers hosting until the spring of 1993. Actor Alan Alda became the permanent host from the fall season of 1993 and continued until the show ended in 2005. The show was also billed as Alan Alda in Scientific American Frontiers. In one segment, Alda became car sick while driving an experimental, virtual reality vehicle. In 2005, in his memoir, Never Have Your Dog Stuffed: and Other Things I've Learned, Alda recalls his intestines becoming strangulated while in the mountains of Chile for the show, an incident in which he nearly died due to the remote location.

== Format ==
Most programs include three short documentaries, but some shows follow a different pattern. Some young viewers of the program later appeared as adult guests in later series, stating that the program inspired them to continue their scientific pursuits. The shows are now available online at the Chedd-Angier website.

== Episodes ==
=== Season 1 (1990–91) ===
No.	Episodes	Release date
1	Episode 1	October 3, 1990
2	Episode 2	November 14, 1990
3	Episode 3	December 12, 1990
4	Special from the Soviet Union	January 9, 1991
5	Episode 5	February 27, 1991

=== Season 2 (1991–92) ===
No.	Episodes	Release date
1	Episode 1	October 23, 1991
2	Episode 2	November 20, 1991
3	Episode 3	December 18, 1991
4	Special from France	January 15, 1992
5	Episode 5	February 12, 1992

=== Season 3 (1992–93) ===
No.	Episodes	Release date
1	Episode 1	October 21, 1992
2	Episode 2	November 11, 1992
3	Episode 3	December 2, 1992
4	Special from Egypt and Israel	January 13, 1993
5	Episode 5	February 10, 1993

=== Season 4 (1993–94) ===
No.	Episodes	Release date
1	Bionics	October 13, 1993
2	Contests	November 3, 1993
3	Science and Sports	December 1, 1993
4	Special from Germany	January 19, 1994
5	Science 911	February 16, 1994

=== Season 5 (1994–95) ===
No.	Episodes	Release date
1	Life's Big Questions	October 5, 1994
2	About All You Can Eat	November 2, 1994
3	Science Italian Style	January 11, 1995
4	Prime Time Primates	February 8, 1995
5	It's A Kid World	April 5, 1995

=== Season 6 (1995–96) ===
No.	Episodes	Release date
1	Wild West	October 4, 1995
2	Dragon Science	November 8, 1995
3	Flying High	January 17, 1996
4	Creatures of the Deep	February 7, 1996
5	21st Century Medicine	April 3, 1996

=== Season 7 (1996–97) ===
No.	Episodes	Release date
1	Inventing the Future	October 23, 1996
2	Science Safari	November 20, 1996
3	Pieces of Mind	January 22, 1997
4	Going to Extremes	February 12, 1997
5	Robots Alive!	April 9, 1997

=== Season 8 (1997–98) ===
No.	Episodes	Release date
1	Expedition Panama	October 8, 1997
2	Beyond Science?	November 19, 1997
3	Nordic Sagas	January 21, 1998
4	The Art of Science	February 18, 1998
5	The New Zoos	April 15, 1998

=== Season 9 (1998–99) ===
No.	Episodes	Release date
1	Science in Paradise	October 7, 1998
2	Journey to Mars	November 11, 1998
3	Animal Einsteins	January 20, 1999
4	Life's Little Questions	February 24, 1999
5	Spiders	April 21, 1999

=== Season 10 (1999–2000) ===
No.	Episodes	Release date
1	Voyage to the Galapagos	October 5, 1999
2	Natural Born Robots	November 2, 1999
3	Never Say Die	January 25, 2000
4	Mediterranean on the Rocks	March 28, 2000
5	The Frontiers Decade	April 25, 2000

=== Season 11 (2000–01) ===
No.	Episodes	Release date
1	Changing Your Mind	November 21, 2000
2	Superpeople	November 28, 2000
3	Life's Really Big Questions	December 19, 2000
4	Affairs of the Heart	January 23, 2001
5	Life's Little Questions II	January 30, 2001
6	Wild Places	February 6, 2001
7	The Bionic Body	March 27, 2001
8	Chimps R Us	April 3, 2001
9	Flying Free	April 10, 2001
10	Fat and Happy	May 1, 2001

=== Season 12 (2001–02) ===
No.	Episodes	Release date
1	Pet Tech	October 16, 2001
2	The Gene Hunters	October 23, 2001
3	Dead Men's Tales	October 30, 2001
4	Alien Invasion	November 6, 2001
5	Growing Up Different	November 13, 2001
6	On the Ball	March 19, 2002
7	Beneath the Sea	May 14, 2002
8	Games Machines Play	May 21, 2002
9	Body Building	May 28, 2002
10	A Different Way to Heal?	June 4, 2002

=== Season 13 (2002–03) ===
No.	Episodes	Release date
1	Unearthing Secret America	October 8, 2002
2	Make Up Your Mind	October 15, 2002
3	The Intimate Machine	October 22, 2002
4	Forever Wild?	November 5, 2002
5	Mysteries of the Deep	November 26, 2002
6	Deep Crisis	January 28, 2003
7	The Wonder Pill	February 18, 2003
8	Calls of the Wild	April 1, 2003
9	You Can Make It On Your Own	April 8, 2003
10	Worried Sick	June 3, 2003

=== Season 14 (2004) ===
No.	Episodes	Release date
1	Losing It	January 20, 2004
2	Don't Forget	May 11, 2004
3	Future Car	May 18, 2004
4	Hot Times in Alaska	June 15, 2004
5	The Dark Side of the Universe	June 22, 2004
6	Coming To America	July 20, 2004

=== Season 15 (2005) ===
No.	Episodes	Release date
1	Surgical Slimmers	January 19, 2005
2	Cars That Think	January 26, 2005
3	Going Deep	February 2, 2005
4	Chimp Minds	February 9, 2005
5	Hot Planet-Cold Comfort	February 16, 2005
6	Hydrogen Hopes	February 23, 2005
7	Hidden Motives	March 2, 2005
8	The Secret Canyon	March 30, 2005
9	Cybersenses	April 6, 2005
10	Robot Pals	April 13, 2005
