= Cabin Life =

American magazine

- Categories: Home magazine
- First issue: April 2001; 25 years ago
- Company: Active Interest Media
- Country: United States
- Based in: Duluth, Minnesota
- Website: www.cabinlife.com
- ISSN: 1540-3785

Cabin Life founded in April 2001, is a US magazine, focused on the vacation-home lifestyle for cabins, cottages, lake homes and lodges.

Based in Duluth, Minnesota, and published eight times a year, the magazine was founded and published by independently owned Fladmark Publishing until its sale to Kalmbach Publishing in September 2009.

The magazine was sold again in 2015 to Active Interest Media who merged the content of Cabin Life with its own Country's Best Cabins.
