= Li Shu (mechanical engineer) =

Mechanical engineer

Lily Hwei-Li Shu is a mechanical engineer whose research involves the engineering design process, including sustainable design, bioinspiration, design for remanufacturing, and psychological factors in design. Educated in the US, she works in Canada as a professor at the University of Toronto.

== Education and career ==
Shu studied mechanical engineering at the University of Nevada, Reno, graduating in 1989. She went to the Massachusetts Institute of Technology for graduate study in mechanical engineering, earning a master's degree in 1992 and completing her Ph.D. in 1996. Her dissertation, Application of a design-for-remanufacture framework to the selection of product life-cycle fastening and joining methods, was supervised by Woodie Flowers.

She is a full professor at the University of Toronto. She has joint appointments in the Department of Mechanical and Industrial Engineering, where she directs the Design Effectiveness Laboratory, and in the Department of Psychology, where she directs the Collaborative Specialization in Psychology and Engineering.

== Recognition ==
Shu was the 2004 recipient of the CIRP F. W. Taylor Medal Award of the International Academy for Production Engineering (CIRP), and was elected as a Fellow of the CIRP in 2013. She was elected as an ASME Fellow in 2021.
