= Daniel Holz =

American physicist

- Education: Princeton University (AB); University of Chicago (PhD)
- Known for: Gravitational waves
- Scientific career
- Fields: Gravitation; Astrophysics; Cosmology
- Workplaces: University of Chicago
- Website: https://holzlab.uchicago.edu/

Daniel Holz is an American physicist specializing in general relativity, astrophysics, and cosmology. He is a professor at the University of Chicago, affiliated with the Departments of Physics, Astronomy & Astrophysics, the Enrico Fermi Institute, and the Kavli Institute for Cosmological Physics.

At the University of Chicago, Holz serves as the founding director of the Existential Risk Laboratory (XLab). In addition to his academic work, Holz is Chair of the Science and Security Board of the Bulletin of the Atomic Scientists, and in this role helps set the time of the Doomsday Clock.

== Education ==
Holz earned his Bachelor of Arts in Physics from Princeton University and his Doctor of Philosophy in Physics from the University of Chicago. He is a member of the Laser Interferometer Gravitational-Wave Observatory (LIGO) collaboration and played a significant role in two discoveries: the first detection of gravitational waves in 2016 and the first multi-messenger detection of a binary neutron star in 2017.

== Career ==
Holz's research has shed light on black holes. Holz is the leader of the LIGO group at the University of Chicago. As part of the LIGO collaboration, Holz and his colleagues contributed to the first observation of gravitational waves, ripples in spacetime caused by the collision of two black holes. This discovery provided a new way to observe the universe and the hidden dynamics of black hole mergers. Holz is also known for contributions to gravitational-wave astronomy, as well as for developing standard sirens as a gravitational-wave probe of cosmology.

Holz teaches a class called "Are We Doomed?" at the University of Chicago. He emphasizes the paradox of human curiosity and vulnerability: "We explore the most distant edges of the universe, probing the mysteries of black holes and the Big Bang, while simultaneously risking the destruction of our own planet."

== Awards ==
Holz has been recognized as a Kavli Fellow by the National Academy of Sciences and is a Fellow of the American Physical Society. He has received awards recognizing his contributions, including:

- The 2012 National Science Foundation CAREER Award.
- The 2015 Quantrell Award for Excellence in Undergraduate Teaching.
- The 2016 Breakthrough Prize in Fundamental Physics, as a member of the LIGO collaboration.
- The 2016 Gruber Cosmology Prize, as a member of the LIGO collaboration.

== Selected publications ==
- Holz, Daniel E.; Wald, Robert M. (3 August 1998). "New method for determining cumulative gravitational lensing effects in inhomogeneous universes". Physical Review D. 58 (6) 063501. arXiv:astro-ph/9708036. Bibcode:1998PhRvD..58f3501H. doi:10.1103/PhysRevD.58.063501. ISSN 0556-2821.
- Holz, Daniel E.; Wheeler, John A. (10 October 2002). "Retro-MACHOs: π in the Sky?". The Astrophysical Journal. 578 (1): 330–334. arXiv:astro-ph/0209039. Bibcode:2002ApJ...578..330H. doi:10.1086/342463. ISSN 0004-637X.
- Holz, Daniel E.; Linder, Eric V. (October 2005). "Safety in Numbers: Gravitational Lensing Degradation of the Luminosity Distance–Redshift Relation". The Astrophysical Journal. 631 (2): 678–688. arXiv:astro-ph/0412173. Bibcode:2005ApJ...631..678H. doi:10.1086/432085. ISSN 0004-637X.
- Holz, Daniel E.; Hughes, Scott A. (10 August 2005). "Using Gravitational-Wave Standard Sirens". The Astrophysical Journal. 629 (1): 15–22. arXiv:astro-ph/0504616. Bibcode:2005ApJ...629...15H. doi:10.1086/431341. ISSN 0004-637X.
- Abbott, B. P.; Holz, D. E.; et al. (11 February 2016). "Observation of Gravitational Waves from a Binary Black Hole Merger". Physical Review Letters. 116 (6) 061102. arXiv:1602.03837. Bibcode:2016PhRvL.116f1102A. doi:10.1103/PhysRevLett.116.061102. ISSN 0031-9007. PMID 26918975.
- Ezquiaga, Jose María; Holz, Daniel E. (3 August 2022). "Spectral Sirens: Cosmology from the Full Mass Distribution of Compact Binaries". Physical Review Letters. 129 (6) 061102. arXiv:2202.08240. Bibcode:2022PhRvL.129f1102E. doi:10.1103/PhysRevLett.129.061102. ISSN 1079-7114.
