= Gilbert Rogin =

- Born: November 14, 1929; Brooklyn
- Died: November 4, 2017 (aged 87); Westport, Connecticut
- Education: Columbia College
- Occupations: Writer, editor
- Spouse: Jacqueline Duvoisin
- Writing career
- Notable work: What Happens Next?

Gilbert Rogin (November 14, 1929–November 4, 2017) was an American journalist and author. He worked in a variety of roles at Time, Inc., published many short stories, and wrote three works of fiction. As a fiction writer, he has been compared to Norman Mailer, Saul Bellow, and Bernard Malamud.

== Time Inc. career ==
Rogin worked at Sports Illustrated for more than 30 years, eventually becoming the magazine's managing editor. Rogin's tenure was covered in Michael MacCambridge's The Franchise: A History of Sports Illustrated Magazine, which addressed the story that Rogin named Mary Decker the 1983 Sportswoman of the Year due to an infatuation. In 1984, Rogin became managing editor of Discover, another Time Inc. title. Rogin was not able to revive the magazine, which was sold by Time, Inc. in 1987, although Discover won a 1986 National Magazine Award for general excellence. Rogin then worked as a corporate editor for the company. In 1992, Rogin helped to launch Vibe; he claimed that the test issue was the first time the word "motherfucker" appeared in a Time, Inc. title. There was some controversy when Rogin decided to hire Jonathan Van Meter as editor-in-chief. Van Meter, a white man, was to oversee a magazine primarily about Black music and culture. Rogin retired from Time, Inc. at the end of 1992. Rogin also consulted and directed for Miller Publishing, which owned Blaze, a spinoff of Vibe, and Tennis, among other titles.

== Writing career ==
Rogin published many stories in The New Yorker, mostly in the 1960s, but was allegedly barred after the rejection of a couple of submissions. John Updike deemed Rogin's stories "amazingly surreal". Rogin's stories were acknowledged by the American Academy of Arts and Letters in 1972. In a review of The Fencing Master, the Oakland Tribune opined that "on a few occasions, the prose begins to take too much delight in itself, but a great deal of the book remains an intriguing adventure in tone." The New York Times considered What Happens Next? "a novel of the first importance." Time wrote that "Rogin shares [John] Cheever's awareness of risk, his sense that to turn a corner of the banal may be to find oneself in a howling waste of strangeness."

Mordecai Richler, in The New York Times, noted in his review of Preparations for the Ascent that Rogin "can be exasperating, unnecessarily oblique at times, but the confusions of his novel are more than redeemed by the literary pleasure of the journey itself." Frederick Exley considered Rogin to be the best writer in their age group. Rogin stopped writing fiction in 1980. In 2010, Rogin's novels were reissued as a single volume. In 2014, "12 Days Before the Mast", about a sailing competition, was listed as one of Sports Illustrated's 60 best articles.

== Bibliography ==
=== Fiction ===
- The Fencing Master and Other Stories (1965)
- What Happens Next? (1971)
- Preparations for the Ascent (1980)

=== Stories ===
All stories published in The New Yorker except as noted.

Title	Publication	Collected in
"To the Warm Islands"	Discovery 5 (1955)	-
"Ernest Observes"	October 26, 1963	The Fencing Master and Other Stories
"Fielding's Progress"	November 30, 1963	The Fencing Master and Other Stories
"A Description of a Presumption"	January 18, 1964	The Fencing Master and Other Stories
"Anna Banana" aka "Night Talk"	Vogue (October 15, 1964)	The Fencing Master and Other Stories
"Judging Keller"	March 14, 1964	The Fencing Master and Other Stories
"1109 Klingenstein"	April 18, 1964	The Fencing Master and Other Stories
"Hello! Goodbye! I Love You!" aka "Wolf Whistle"	Vogue (August 1, 1964)	The Fencing Master and Other Stories
"A Blessed Day"	Mademoiselle (September 1964)	The Fencing Master and Other Stories
"Chico King, Popular Singer"	Esquire (October 1964)	The Fencing Master and Other Stories
"At the Sea-Vue Arms"	October 24, 1964	The Fencing Master and Other Stories
"Them Apples"	December 19, 1964	The Fencing Master and Other Stories
"Lesser Married"	February 27, 1965	The Fencing Master and Other Stories
"At the Tepid Baths"	The Fencing Master and Other Stories (1965)	The Fencing Master and Other Stories
"The Fencing Master"	The Fencing Master and Other Stories (1965)	The Fencing Master and Other Stories
"A Short Novel"	January 1, 1966	from What Happens Next?
"The Indoor Bird Watcher"	April 2, 1966	from What Happens Next?
"The Players"	April 30, 1966	from What Happens Next?
"An Uncompleted Investigation"	July 9, 1966	from What Happens Next?
"An Uncompleted Investigation, Furthered and Annotated"	March 4, 1967	from What Happens Next?
"Cheering Up Charley"	January 27, 1968	from What Happens Next?
"The Something of the World"	March 2, 1968	from What Happens Next?
"Two Men of Affairs"	May 25, 1968	from What Happens Next?
"What John McGraw Said"	The Reporter (June 13, 1968)	from What Happens Next?
"What We See Before Us"	July 6, 1968	from What Happens Next?
"Solving the World's Problems"	July 27, 1968	from What Happens Next?
"Time and Effort"	April 19, 1969	from What Happens Next?
"You Say What I Feel"	July 12, 1969	from What Happens Next?
"To the Fjord Country"	September 20, 1969	from What Happens Next?
"How It Turns Out"	November 15, 1969	from What Happens Next?
"Space Ant"	Cosmopolitan (July 1970)	from What Happens Next?
"Taking Stock"	August 2, 1970	from What Happens Next?
"The Regulars"	November 7, 1970	from What Happens Next?
"The Spanish House"	May 15, 1971	from What Happens Next?
"Address to the Orgiasts"	June 5, 1971	from What Happens Next?
"La-Dah-Dah-Dah-Dum"	December 18, 1971	from Preparations for the Ascent
"Facing Reality"	September 2, 1972	from Preparations for the Ascent
"The Sans Souci Launderama"	April 28, 1973	from Preparations for the Ascent
"Night Thoughts"	September 2, 1974	from Preparations for the Ascent
"Splitting Up"	September 1, 1975	from Preparations for the Ascent
"Near Darkness"	May 3, 1976	from Preparations for the Ascent
"The Hard Parts"	November 20, 1978	from Preparations for the Ascent
"In the Abyss"	Harper's (July 1979)	from Preparations for the Ascent
