= Gear (magazine) =

International men's magazine

- Logo from the cover of Gear
- Editor: Bob Guccione, Jr.
- Categories: Men's
- Publisher: Bob Guccione, Jr.
- Total circulation: 500,000 (2001)
- Founded: 1998
- Final issue: 2003
- Company: Guccione Media
- Country: United States, others
- Based in: New York City
- ISSN: 1099-6494

Gear was an American men's magazine published by Bob Guccione, Jr. devoted chiefly to revealing pictorials of popular singers, B-movie actresses, and models, along with articles on gadgets, cars, fashion, sex, and sports.

== History and profile ==
Gear debuted in September 1998, with actress Peta Wilson on the cover. The magazine established itself with several publishing stunts such as publishing a nude photo of women's football celebrity Brandi Chastain.

March 2000 cover featuring Jessica Biel

When Gear featured a pictorial of a scantily clad Jessica Biel in the March 2000 issue, who posed while appearing on the family drama 7th Heaven and was then 17 years old, actor Stephen Collins, who played her father on the show, described the pictures as "child pornography". Biel later cited it as one of her biggest regrets. Esquire magazine described the photo shoot as "quasi-infamous".

Guccione described his vision for the magazine as being a successor to the likes of Esquire and GQ and to produce a literate magazine that includes quality journalism alongside articles on celebrities and fashion. Advertisers viewed the magazine as being more like Maxim, Stuff, or FHM, forcing it into the category of lads mags. Efforts were made to change the magazine's perceived image by moving from covers featuring scantily clad female celebrities to different cover images, including notable actors such as Elijah Wood and Christian Slater.

Gear closed in 2003 with the intention of relaunching at a later date, hoping to break out of the lads mag category as Details had done. The magazine was described as similar to Spin also founded by Bob Guccione, Jr., and was praised for attempts to achieve the same kind of serious journalism. Ann Gerhart of The Washington Post described the magazine derisively as "the frat boy's Esquire".

== See also ==
- Lad culture
