= Cosmic variance =

Statistical uncertainty in universe observations

The term cosmic variance is the statistical uncertainty inherent in observations of the universe at extreme distances. It has three different but closely related meanings:

- It is sometimes used, incorrectly, to mean sample variance – the difference between different finite samples of the same parent population. Such differences follow a Poisson distribution, and in this case the term sample variance should be used instead.
- It is sometimes used, mainly by cosmologists, to mean the uncertainty because we can only observe one realization of all the possible observable universes. For example, we can only observe one Cosmic Microwave Background, so the measured positions of the peaks in the Cosmic Microwave Background spectrum, integrated over the visible sky, are limited by the fact that only one spectrum is observable from Earth. The observable universe viewed from another galaxy will have the peaks in slightly different places, while remaining consistent with the same physical laws, inflation, etc. This second meaning may be regarded as a special case of the third meaning.
- The most widespread use, to which the rest of this article refers, reflects the fact that measurements are affected by cosmic large-scale structure, so a measurement of any region of sky (viewed from Earth) may differ from a measurement of a different region of sky (also viewed from Earth) by an amount that may be much greater than the sample variance.

This most widespread use of the term is based on the idea that it is only possible to observe part of the universe at one particular time, so it is difficult to make statistical statements about cosmology on the scale of the entire universe, as the number of observations (sample size) must be not too small.

== Background ==
The standard Big Bang model is usually supplemented with cosmic inflation. In inflationary models, the observer only sees a tiny fraction of the whole universe, much less than a billionth (1/10^{9}) of the volume of the universe postulated in inflation. So the observable universe (the so-called particle horizon of the universe) is the result of processes that follow some general physical laws, including quantum mechanics and general relativity. Some of these processes are random: for example, the distribution of galaxies throughout the universe can only be described statistically and cannot be derived from first principles.

== Philosophical issues ==
This raises philosophical problems: suppose that random physical processes happen on length scales both smaller than and bigger than the particle horizon. A physical process (such as an amplitude of a primordial perturbation in density) that happens on the horizon scale only gives us one observable realization. A physical process on a larger scale gives us zero observable realizations. A physical process on a slightly smaller scale gives us a small number of realizations.

In the case of only one realization it is difficult to draw statistical conclusions about its significance. For example, if the underlying model of a physical process implies that the observed property should occur only 1% of the time, does that really mean that the model is excluded? Consider the physical model of the citizenship of human beings in the early 21st century, where about 30% are Indian and Chinese citizens, about 5% are American citizens, about 1% are French citizens, and so on. For an observer who has only one observation (of his/her own citizenship) and who happens to be French and cannot make any external observations, the model can be rejected at the 99% significance level. Yet the external observers with more information unavailable to the first observer, know that the model is correct.

In other words, even if the bit of the universe observed is the result of a statistical process, the observer can only view one realization of that process, so our observation is statistically insignificant for saying much about the model, unless the observer is careful to include the variance. This variance is called the cosmic variance and is separate from other sources of experimental error: a very accurate measurement of only one value drawn from a distribution still leaves considerable uncertainty about the underlying model. Variance is normally plotted separately from other sources of uncertainty. Because it is necessarily a large fraction of the signal, workers must be very careful in interpreting the statistical significance of measurements on scales close to the particle horizon.

In physical cosmology, the common way of dealing with this on the horizon scale and on slightly sub-horizon scales (where the number of occurrences is greater than one but still quite small), is to explicitly include the variance of very small statistical samples (Poisson distribution) when calculating uncertainties. This is important in describing the low multipoles of the cosmic microwave background and has been the source of much controversy in the cosmology community since the COBE and WMAP measurements.

== Similar problems ==
A similar problem is faced by evolutionary biologists. Just as cosmologists have a sample size of one universe, biologists have a sample size of one fossil record. The problem is closely related to the anthropic principle.

Another problem of limited sample sizes in astronomy, here practical rather than essential, is in the Titius–Bode law on spacing of satellites in an orbital system. Originally observed for the Solar System, the difficulty in observing other solar systems has limited data to test this.

== See also ==
- Cosmological principle

== Sources ==
- Stephen Hawking (2003). Cosmology from the Top Down. Proceedings of the Davis Meeting on Cosmic Inflation.
