= Ball Four =

Book by Jim Bouton

- Paperback edition
- Author: Jim Bouton with Leonard Shecter
- Language: English
- Subject: Baseball
- Genre: Autobiography
- Publisher: World Publishing Company
- Publication date: June 17, 1970
- Publication place: United States
- Media type: Print (Hardcover)
- Pages: 371 (first edition)
- ISBN: 0-02-030665-2

Ball Four: My Life and Hard Times Throwing the Knuckleball in the Big Leagues is a book by Major League Baseball pitcher Jim Bouton, edited by Leonard Shecter and first published in 1970. The book is a diary of Bouton's 1969 season, spent with the Seattle Pilots and then the Houston Astros following a late-season trade. Bouton also recounts much of his earlier baseball career, spent mainly with the New York Yankees.

The book was controversial for divulging many unflattering facts about the sport and its players; baseball commissioner Bowie Kuhn attempted to discredit it and label it as detrimental to the sport. It is considered a landmark in American sports literature, and was the only sports-themed book included on the New York Public Library's 1996 list of Books of the Century, under the category "Popular Culture & Mass Entertainment". It was also included on Time's list of the 100 greatest non-fiction books published since the magazine's founding in 1923.

== Summary ==
Bouton befriended sportswriter Leonard Shecter during his time with the Yankees. Shecter approached him with the idea of writing and publishing a season-long diary. Bouton, who had taken some notes during the 1968 season after having a similar idea, readily agreed. The book chronicled the 1969 season, which was the Seattle Pilots' only operating season, though Bouton was traded to Houston late in the year.

Ball Four described a side of baseball that was previously unseen by writing about the obscene jokes, drunken womanizing, and routine drug use among players, including by Bouton himself. Bouton wrote with candor about the anxiety he felt over his pitching and his role on the team. Bouton detailed his unsatisfactory relationships with teammates and management alike, his sparring sessions with Pilots manager Joe Schultz and pitching coach Sal Maglie, and the lies and minor cheating that has gone on in baseball.

Bouton disclosed how rampant the use of amphetamines or "greenies" was among players. Also revealed was the heavy drinking of Yankee legend Mickey Mantle, which had previously been kept almost entirely out of the press. Bouton additionally described clashes with his coaches (usually about his role with the team, his opinion that he should use the knuckleball exclusively, and his desire to throw between outings) and his outspoken views on politics.

== Title ==
The book's title was suggested by a female customer of a tavern called the Lion's Head in New York City's Greenwich Village neighborhood. Having recently completed the manuscript, Bouton and Shecter were discussing the book at the bar, lamenting the fact that with the book ready for print they still had not arrived on an acceptable name. According to Bouton:

At that moment, this drunk lady at the bar said, 'Why don't you call it Ball Four?' We laughed about it and thought it was pretty funny, and as we're walking through the streets later, [Shecter] said, 'You know, Ball Four is not a bad name.'

== Publication and response ==
Ball Four proved to be commercially successful. The first edition was published with a print run of just 5,000 copies and quickly sold out. Reprints, translations, and new editions ensued, with the book ultimately selling millions of copies worldwide, eventually being considered a classic.

=== Reaction within baseball ===
Baseball commissioner Bowie Kuhn called Ball Four "detrimental to baseball", and tried to force Bouton to sign a statement saying that the book was completely fictional. Bouton refused to deny any of the revelations in Ball Four. Many of Bouton's teammates never forgave him for publicly airing what he had learned in private about their flaws and foibles. The book made Bouton unpopular with many players, coaches and officials on other teams as well, as they felt he had betrayed the long-standing rule: "What you see here, what you say here, what you do here, let it stay here." Pete Rose took to yelling "Fuck you, Shakespeare!" from the dugout whenever Bouton was pitching.

A number of sportswriters also denounced Bouton, with Dick Young leading the way, calling Bouton and Shecter "social lepers".

Although Bouton wrote about Mickey Mantle in a mostly positive light, his comments on Mantle's excesses spawned most of the book's notoriety, and provoked Bouton's essential blacklisting from baseball. Bouton tried several times to make peace with Mantle, but not until Bouton sent a condolence note after Mantle's son Billy died of cancer in 1994 did Mantle contact Bouton. The two former teammates reconciled not long before Mantle's death in 1995.

Hank Aaron, Leo Durocher, Mickey Mantle and Tom Gorman, each of whom had, at one time or another, been either directly or indirectly associated with Bouton, expressed their opinions on the book, none of them favorable, on a 1979 episode of The Dick Cavett Show.

== Legacy ==
The following year, Bouton described the fallout from Ball Four and his ensuing battles with Commissioner Kuhn and others in another book, titled I'm Glad You Didn't Take It Personally. Bouton dedicated the book to sportswriter Dick Young and Bowie Kuhn.

In 1976, Ball Four became the inspiration for an eponymous television sitcom. Bouton starred as "Jim Barton", a baseball player who was also a writer with a preoccupation with his teammates' personal lives. The show was canceled after five episodes.

In an interview with the website Five Books, sportswriter Joe Posnanski named Ball Four as one of the best baseball books, saying "it's beautifully written, and, again, there's a lot of humanity in it. There is certainly also a lot of shock value in it. There are stories about taking drugs and some of the off-field relationships. That is what made the book somewhat scandalous when it first came out." But Posnanski says the book is really about trying to hold on to youth, citing the last line: "You spend a good piece of your life gripping a baseball, and in the end, it turns out that it was the other way around all the time."

Bouton's authorship of Ball Four led to his being named as one of three author-plaintiffs in the case of Authors Guild, Inc. v. Google, Inc., ultimately losing his case in the Second Circuit Court of Appeals in 2015.
