= Jim Bouton =

American baseball player (1939–2019)

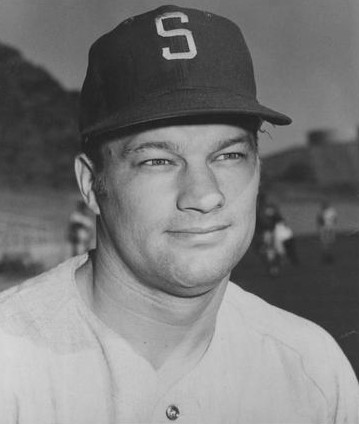
- Bouton with the Seattle Pilots in 1969
- Pitcher
- Born: March 8, 1939; Newark, New Jersey, U.S.
- Died: July 10, 2019 (aged 80); Great Barrington, Massachusetts, U.S.
- Batted: Right Threw: Right

MLB debut
- April 22, 1962, for the New York Yankees

Last MLB appearance
- September 29, 1978, for the Atlanta Braves

MLB statistics
- Win–loss record: 62–63
- Earned run average: 3.57
- Strikeouts: 720
- Stats at Baseball Reference

Teams
- New York Yankees (1962–1968); Seattle Pilots (1969); Houston Astros (1969–1970); Atlanta Braves (1978)

Career highlights and awards
- All-Star (1963); World Series champion (1962)

James Alan Bouton (/ˈbaʊtən/; March 8, 1939 – July 10, 2019) was an American professional baseball player. Bouton played in Major League Baseball (MLB) as a pitcher for the New York Yankees, Seattle Pilots, Houston Astros, and Atlanta Braves between 1962 and 1978. He was also a best-selling author, actor, activist, sportscaster and one of the creators of Big League Chew.

Bouton played college baseball at Western Michigan University, before signing his first professional contract with the Yankees. He was a member of the 1962 World Series champions, appeared in the 1963 MLB All-Star Game, and won both of his starts in the 1964 World Series. Later in his career, he developed and threw a knuckleball. Bouton authored the 1970 baseball book Ball Four, which was a combination diary of his 1969 season and memoir of his years with the Yankees, Pilots, and Astros.

== Amateur and college career ==
Bouton was born in Newark, New Jersey, the son of Gertrude (Vischer) and George Hempstead Bouton, an executive. He grew up as a fan of the New York Giants in Rochelle Park, New Jersey, where he lived until the age of 13. He lived with his family in Ridgewood, New Jersey until he was 15, when his family relocated to Homewood, Illinois. Bouton enrolled at Bloom High School, where he played for the school's baseball team.

Bouton was nicknamed "Warm-Up Bouton" because he never got to play in a game, serving much of his time as a benchwarmer. Bloom's star pitcher at that time was Jerry Colangelo, who later would become owner of the Arizona Diamondbacks and Phoenix Suns. In summer leagues, Bouton did not throw particularly hard, but he got batters out by mixing conventional pitches with the knuckleball that he had experimented with since childhood. Bouton attended Western Michigan University, and pitched for the Western Michigan Broncos baseball team. He earned a scholarship for his second year. That summer, he played amateur baseball, catching the attention of scouts. Yankees scout Art Stewart signed Bouton for $30,000.

== Professional career ==
Bouton signed with the Yankees as an amateur free agent in 1959. After playing in minor league baseball, Bouton started his major league career in 1962 with the Yankees, where his tenacity earned him the nickname "Bulldog." By this time, he had developed a formidable fastball. He also came to be known for his cap flying off his head at the completion of his delivery to the plate, as well as for his uniform number 56, a number usually assigned in spring training to players designated for the minor leagues. (Bouton later explained that he had been assigned the number in 1962 when he was promoted to the Yankees, and wanted to keep it as a reminder of how close he had come to not making the ball club. He wore number 56 throughout most of his major league career.)

Bouton appeared in 36 games (16 starts) during the 1962 season, going 7–7 with two saves and a 3.99 ERA. He did not play in the Yankees' 1962 World Series victory over the San Francisco Giants, although he had originally been slated to start Game 7. When the game was postponed a day because of rain, Ralph Terry pitched instead. Bouton went 21–7 and 18–13 in the next two seasons, and appeared in the 1963 All-Star Game. In Game 3 of the 1963 World Series, Don Drysdale of the Los Angeles Dodgers pitched a three-hit shutout in a 1–0 victory, while Bouton gave up just four hits in seven innings for the Yankees. The only run scored in the first inning on a walk, wild pitch and single by Tommy Davis that bounced off the pitching mound.

Bouton won both his starts in the 1964 World Series. He beat the St. Louis Cardinals 2–1 with a complete-game six-hitter on October 10 on a walk-off home run by Mickey Mantle, then won again on October 14 at Busch Stadium, 8–3, backed by another Mantle homer and a Joe Pepitone grand slam. He was 2–1 with a 1.48 ERA in three career World Series starts.

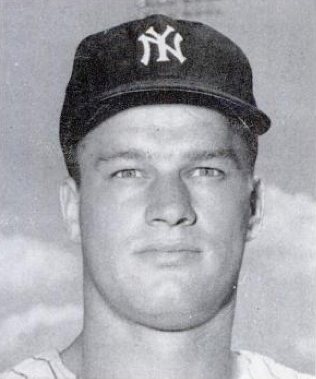
Bouton in 1963 with the Yankees.

Bouton's frequent use by the Yankees during these years (he led the league with 37 starts in 1964 in addition to pitching in that year's World Series) probably contributed to his subsequent arm troubles. In 1965, an arm injury slowed his fastball and ended his status as a pitching phenomenon. Relegated mostly to bullpen duty, Bouton began to throw the knuckleball again, in an effort to lengthen his career. He was 1–1 in 12 appearances when his contract was sold on June 15, 1968, by the Yankees to the Seattle Pilots before the expansion franchise ever played a game. He was assigned to the Seattle Angels for the remainder of the campaign. In October 1968, Bouton joined a committee of American sportsmen who traveled to the 1968 Summer Olympics, in Mexico City, to protest the involvement of apartheid South Africa.

He was used almost exclusively out of the bullpen by the Pilots in 1969. On May 16, he pitched three hitless innings of relief without allowing a run against the Boston Red Sox at Fenway Park. The Pilots scored six in the top of the 11th inning to earn him the win, even though other Seattle relievers gave five runs back in the bottom of the 11th. Bouton earned another win in July against the Red Sox with 1 1/3 innings of relief, again not allowing a hit. Over 57 appearances with the Pilots, he compiled a 2–1 record with a 3.91 ERA.

The Pilots traded him to the Houston Astros in late August, where Bouton was 0–2 with a 4.11 ERA in 16 appearances (one start).

=== Ball Four ===
Around 1968, sportswriter Leonard Shecter, who had befriended Bouton during his time with the Yankees, approached him with the idea of writing a season-long diary. Bouton agreed; he had taken some notes during the 1968 season with a similar goal.

The diary that became Ball Four, which was originally published in abridged form as a June 2, 1970 article in LOOK magazine titled "My Love/Hate Affair with Baseball," chronicled Bouton's experiences the next year with the Pilots. The diary also followed Bouton during his two-week stint with the Triple-A Vancouver Mounties in April, and after his trade to the Houston Astros in late August. Ball Four was not the first baseball diary (Cincinnati Reds pitcher Jim Brosnan had written two such books), but it became more widely known and discussed than its predecessors.

The book was a frank, insider's look at professional sports teams, covering the off-the-field side of baseball life, including petty jealousies, obscene jokes, drunken tomcatting of the players, and routine drug use, including by Bouton himself. Upon its publication, baseball commissioner Bowie Kuhn called Ball Four "detrimental to baseball", and tried to force Bouton to sign a statement saying that the book was completely fictional. Bouton, however, refused to deny any of Ball Four's revelations. Some teammates never forgave him for disclosing information given to him in confidence, and naming names. The book made Bouton unpopular with many players, coaches, and officials on other teams as well; he was informally blacklisted from baseball.

Bouton's writings about Mickey Mantle's lifestyle were most notorious, though they comprise few pages of Ball Four and much of the material was complimentary. For example, when Bouton got his first shutout win as a Yankee, he describes Mantle laying a "red carpet" of white towels leading directly to Bouton's locker in his honor.

The controversy and book sales enabled Bouton to write a sequel, I'm Glad You Didn't Take It Personally, in which he discussed both the controversies and reactions to Ball Four, and the end of his original pitching career and his transition to becoming a New York sportscaster.

=== Retirement ===
Bouton retired midway through the 1970 season, shortly after the Astros sent him down to the minor leagues. After a handful of unsatisfactory appearances, Bouton left baseball to become a local sports anchor for New York station WABC-TV, as part of Eyewitness News; he later held the same job for WCBS-TV. In 1973, Bouton published a collection of manager tales, including one by Bouton himself about Joe Schultz, his manager with the Seattle Pilots. Bouton also became an actor, playing the part of Terry Lennox in Robert Altman's The Long Goodbye (1973), plus the lead role of Jim Barton in the 1976 CBS television series Ball Four, which was loosely adapted from the book. The show was canceled after five episodes. Decades later, Bouton would also have a brief one-line cameo as a pitching coach in the 2010 James L. Brooks film How Do You Know.

By the mid-1970s, a cult audience saw the book Ball Four as a candid and comic portrayal of the ups and downs of baseball life. Bouton went on the college lecture circuit, delivering humorous talks on his experiences. He authored a sequel, I'm Glad You Didn't Take It Personally, and later updated the original book with a new extended postscript that provided a ten-year update, dubbed Ball Five.

=== Return ===
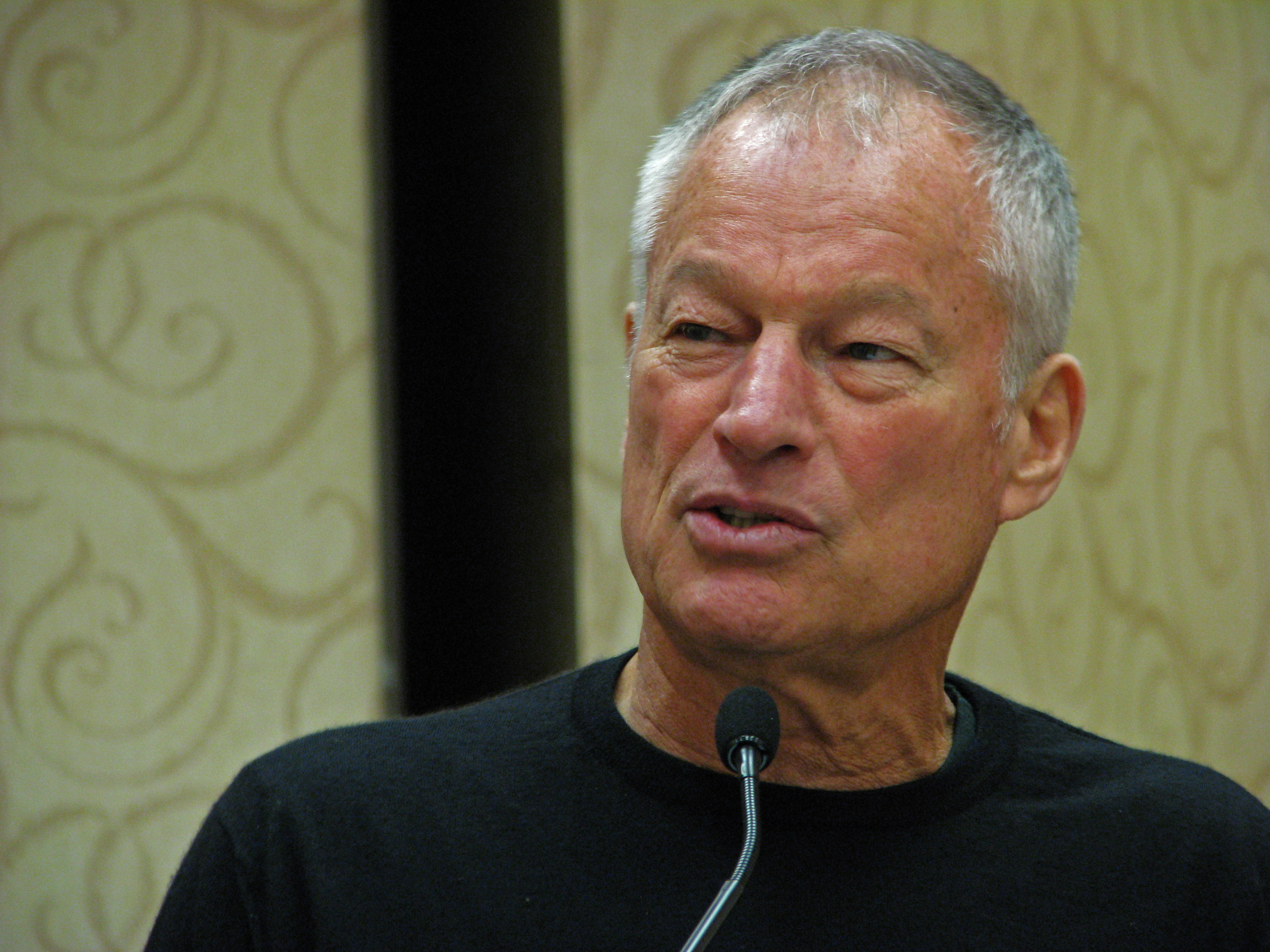
Jim Bouton speaking at the Seattle Pilots' Anniversary Celebration in August 2009

Bouton launched his comeback bid with the Portland Mavericks of the Class A Northwest League in 1975, compiling a 5–1 record. He skipped the 1976 season to work on the TV series, but he returned to the diamond in 1977 when Bill Veeck signed him to a minor league contract with the Chicago White Sox. Bouton was winless for a White Sox farm club; a stint in the Mexican League and a return to Portland followed.

In 1978, Ted Turner signed Bouton to a contract with the Atlanta Braves. After a successful season with the Double-A Savannah Braves of the Southern League, he was called up to join Atlanta's rotation in September, and compiled a 1–3 record with a 4.97 ERA in five starts. His winding return to the majors was chronicled in a book by sportswriter Terry Pluto, The Greatest Summer. Bouton also detailed his comeback in a 10th anniversary re-release of his first book, titled Ball Four Plus Ball Five, as well as adding a Ball Six, updating the stories of the players in Ball Four, for the 20th anniversary edition. All were included (in 2000) as Ball Four: The Final Pitch, along with a new coda that detailed the death of his daughter and his reconciliation with the Yankees.

After his return to the majors, Bouton continued to pitch at the semi-pro level for a Bergen County, New Jersey, team called the Emerson-Westwood Merchants, among other teams in the Metropolitan Baseball League in northern New Jersey, while living in Teaneck, New Jersey.

Once his baseball career ended a second time, Bouton became one of the inventors of "Big League Chew", a shredded bubblegum designed to resemble chewing tobacco and sold in a tobacco-like pouch. He also co-authored Strike Zone (a baseball novel) and edited an anthology about managers, entitled I Managed Good, But Boy Did They Play Bad (published 1973). His most recent book is Foul Ball, a non-fiction account of his attempt to save Wahconah Park, a historic minor league baseball stadium in Pittsfield, Massachusetts. The book was released in 2003 and later updated in 2005.

Although Bouton had never been officially declared persona non grata by the Yankees or any other team as a result of Ball Four's revelations, he was excluded from most baseball-related functions, including Old-Timers' Games. It was rumored that Mickey Mantle himself had told the Yankees that he would never attend an Old-Timers' Game to which Bouton was invited. Later, Mantle denied this charge during an answering-machine message to Bouton after Mantle's son Billy had died of cancer in 1994 — Mantle was acknowledging a condolence card Bouton had sent.

On June 21, 1998, (Father's Day) Bouton's oldest son Michael wrote an open letter to the Yankees, which was published in The New York Times, in which Michael described the agony of his father following the August 1997 death of Michael's sister Laurie at age 31, with Michael wishing that the Yankees would invite Bouton to their Old Timers Game on July 25 (he noted Yogi Berra's decision to not participate in the game as long as George Steinbrenner was owner, but he cited it as just as petty for Berra to spite Steinbrenner as it is for Steinbrenner to spite Bouton). Not long after, the Yankees elected to invite him to the Old Timers Game. On July 25, 1998, Bouton, sporting his familiar number 56, received a standing ovation when he took the mound at Yankee Stadium.

== Personal life ==
Bouton and his first wife Bobbie had two children together, Michael and Laurie, and adopted a Korean orphan, Kyong Jo. Kyong Jo later changed his name to David. Bobbie and Bouton divorced in 1981. In 1983, Bouton's ex-wife teamed up with Nancy Marshall, the former wife of pitcher Mike Marshall, to write a tell-all book called Home Games. In response to the book's publication, Bouton commented:

We all have the right to write about our lives, and she does, too. If the book is insightful, if it helps people, I may be applauding it.

I'm sure most of the things she says are true. I smoked grass, I ran around, I found excuses to stay on the road. It got so bad that I smoked grass to numb myself. It took me a year to where my brain worked again. I no longer think of grass as harmless. We were in the death throes of a marriage. She should ask herself how did she not see these things.

In 1997, Laurie was killed in a car accident at age 31. Bouton later married Paula Kurman. They had six grandchildren.

In 2012, Bouton had a stroke that did not impair him physically but damaged his memory and speaking.

Bouton promoted the Vintage Base Ball Federation to form vintage clubs and leagues internationally, to codify the rules and equipment of its 19th-century origins, and to organize competitions.

Bouton was a delegate to the 1972 Democratic National Convention for George McGovern.

Bouton died at home on July 10, 2019, after weeks of hospice care for cerebral amyloid angiopathy, at age 80.

== Written works ==
- Ball Four has been through numerous significantly revised editions, the most recent being Ball Four: The Final Pitch, Bulldog Publishing. (April 2001), ISBN 0-9709117-0-X.
- I'm Glad You Didn't Take It Personally
- I Managed Good, But Boy Did They Play Bad – edited and annotated by Bouton, compiled by Neil Offen.
- Foul Ball, Bulldog Publishing. (June 2003), ISBN 0-9709117-1-8.
- Strike Zone, Signet Books. (March 1995), ISBN 0-451-18334-7 (with Eliot Asinof).

== See also ==
- List of knuckleball pitchers
