= Hubble (disambiguation) =

The Hubble Space Telescope is a telescope in low Earth orbit.

Hubble may also refer to:

== Astronomy ==
- Hubble sequence, a classification of galaxy types
- Hubble's law, a statement in physical cosmology
- Hubble (crater), a lunar crater
- 2069 Hubble, a main-belt asteroid
- C/1937 P1 (Hubble), a long-period comet

== People ==
- Edwin Hubble, an astronomer born in 1889
- Hubble (surname), a surname and list of people with the surname

== Places ==
- Hubble, Kentucky
- Hubble Township, Cape Girardeau County, Missouri
- Hubble Creek (Castor River Diversion Channel), a stream in Missouri
- Hubble Creek (St. Francis River), a stream in Missouri

== Other uses ==
- Hubble (film), a 2010 documentary film about the telescope
- Hubble Connected or Hubble, a subsidiary of Binatone
- Hubble (climbing route), a famous climbing route

== See also ==
- Edwin Hubble House, a historic house in San Marino, California, US
- Hubbell (disambiguation)
