= Hubbell =

Hubbell may refer to:

== Places in the United States ==
- Hubbell, Michigan
- Hubbells, Missouri
- Hubbell, Nebraska

== Other uses ==
- Hubble Space Telescope
- Hubble (crater), a lunar impact crater
- Hubble (film), a 2010 American documentary film
- Hubbell (surname)
- Hubbell Center, the museum, library, and archive of the Hubbell family in North America
- Hubbell Incorporated, an electric and electronic products manufacturer
- Hubbell connector, see "Twist-Lock connector"

== See also ==
- Justice Hubbell (disambiguation)
- Hubble (disambiguation)
