= Cannon (crater) =

Lunar impact crater

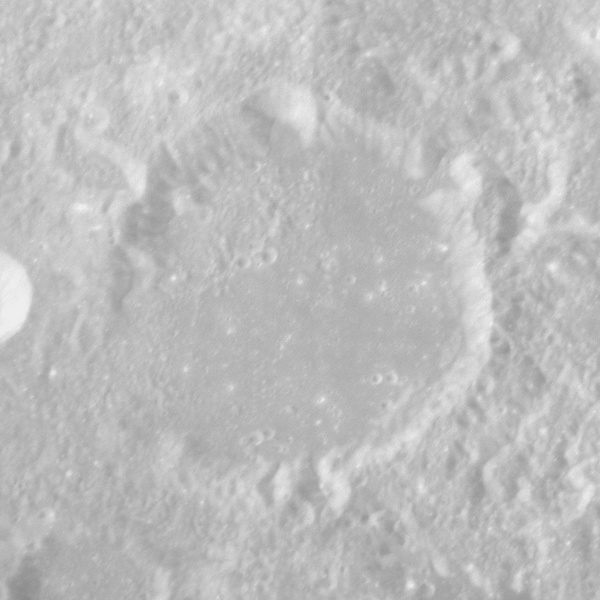
- Apollo 16 image
- Coordinates: 19.9°N 81.4°E
- Diameter: 57.58 km (35.78 mi)
- Depth: Unknown
- Colongitude: 280° at sunrise
- Eponym: Annie J. Cannon

Cannon is a lunar impact crater that is located near the east-northeastern limb of the Moon's near side. It lies just to the northwest of the Mare Marginis, and south-southeast of the crater Plutarch. Farther to the east-northeast is Hubble.

This is a worn and eroded formation with an interior floor that has been resurfaced by lava. A small crater overlies the north rim, which forms a notch in the side. Tiny craters also lie across the rim northeast and at the southern edge. The interior is level and nearly featureless, with only a few tiny scattered craterlets to mark the surface. This floor has the same albedo as the surrounding terrain.

Originally identified as satellite feature Alhazen F, this crater is named after American astronomer Annie Jump Cannon (1863–1941), who spectrlly classified 300,000 stellar bodies. Her name was introduced into lunar nomenclature by David W. G. Arthur and Ewen Whitaker with the Rectified Lunar Atlas (1963). Its designation was officially adopted by the International Astronomical Union in 1964. Alhazen itself is located to the west southwest.

== Satellite craters ==
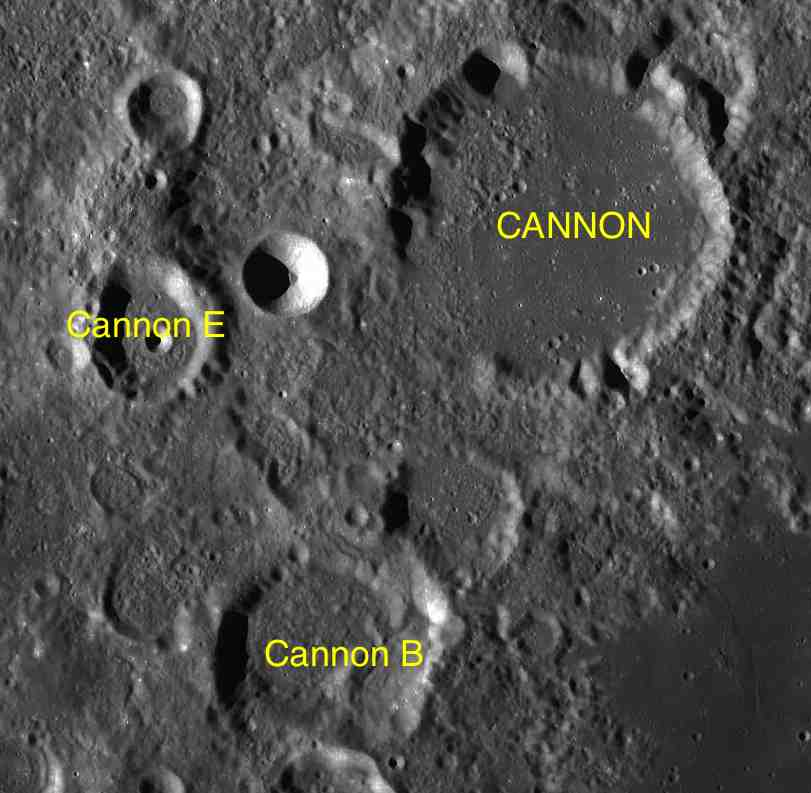
Satellite features of Cannon

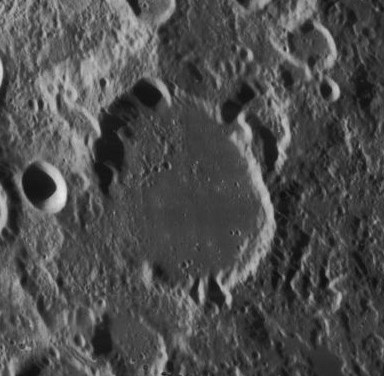
Oblique Lunar Orbiter 4 image

By convention these features are identified on lunar maps by placing the letter on the side of the crater midpoint that is closest to Cannon.

Cannon	Latitude	Longitude	Diameter
B	17.5° N	80.0° E	31 km
E	19.2° N	79.1° E	22 km

== See also ==
- 1120 Cannonia, main-belt asteroid
