= Hubbell (surname) =

Hubbell is a surname of English, Norman and Germanic origin. Hubbell is the 5667th most common family name in the United States according to the U.S. Census. Genealogical sources indicate a Hubbell residing in Worcestershire, England circa 1530.

- Carl Hubbell (1903–1988), American baseball pitcher
- Edwin N. Hubbell (1815–?), American politician
- Harvey Hubbell (1857–1927), American inventor, entrepreneur and industrialist
- J. Lorenzo Hubbell (1853–1930), American trader and politician
- James Hubbell (artist) (born 1931), American artist, sculptor and architect
- James Randolph Hubbell (1824–1890), American politician
- James T. Hubbell (1855–1929), American politician
- Jay Abel Hubbell (1829–1900), American politician
- John H. Hubbell (1925–2007), American radiation physicist
- John Raymond Hubbell (1879–1954), American composer
- Keiffer Hubbell, American ice dancer
- Levi Hubbell (1808-1876), American politician
- Levi M. Hubbell (1826-1910), American politician
- Madison Hubbell, American ice dancer
- Richard W. Hubbell (1840-1910), American politician
- Stephen P. Hubbell (born 1942), American ecologist
- Sue Hubbell (1935–2018), American author
- Wayne L. Hubbell (born 1943), American biochemist
- Webster Hubbell (born 1949), American lawyer and politician
- Will Hubbell, American author and illustrator
- William Spring Hubbell (1801–1873), American politician
- William Stone Hubbell (1837–1930), U.S. Army captain, Medal of Honor recipient

== See also ==
- Hubbell (disambiguation)
- Hubble (disambiguation), variant of Hubbell
