= Condorcet (crater) =

Lunar impact crater

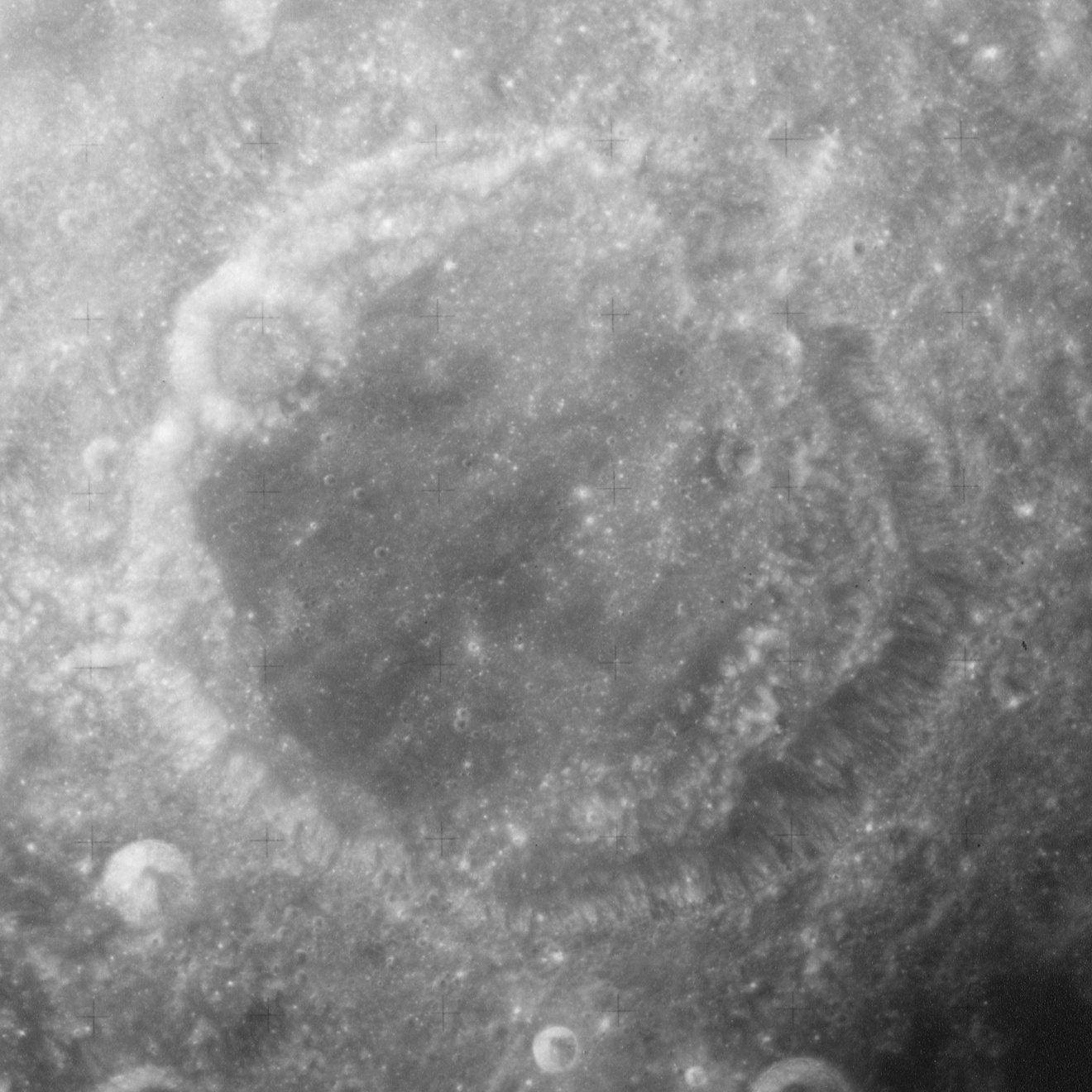
- Apollo 17 mapping camera image
- Coordinates: 12.1°N 69.58°E
- Diameter: 74.85 km (46.51 mi)
- Depth: 2.7 km (1.7 mi)
- Colongitude: 292° at sunrise
- Formation: Nectarian
- Eponym: Marquis de Condorcet

Condorcet is a lunar impact crater that is located in the eastern part of the Moon's near side, close to the southeast of the Mare Crisium. To the northeast of Condorcet are the craters Hansen and Alhazen.

This crater dates to around the time the Crisium basin formed, during the Nectarian period on the lunar geologic timescale. The outer rim is eroded, with a low saddle point along the northern wall and the satellite crater Condorcet Y lies across the northwestern rim. The interior floor has been resurfaced, leaving a level, nearly featureless surface that is marked only by a few tiny craterlets. The floor has a large dark patch in the western half, but the remainder is approximately the same albedo as the surrounding terrain.

This crater is named after French mathematician Jean Marquis de Condorcet (1743-1794). His name was included in the lunar nomenclature of German astronomer Johann Hieronymus Schröter in 1791. Its designation was formally adopted by the International Astronomical Union in 1935.

== Satellite craters ==
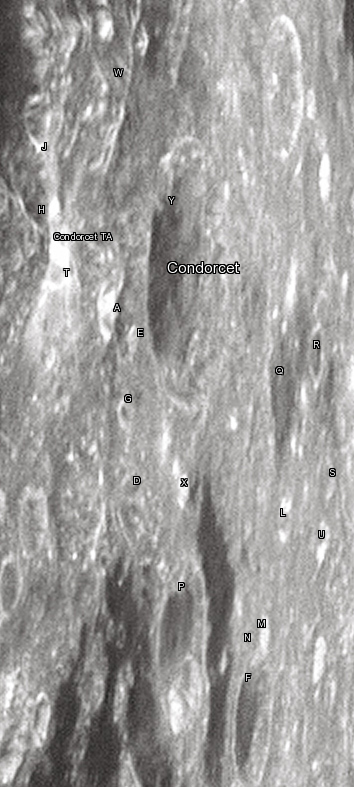
Condorcet crater and its satellite craters taken from Earth in 2012 at the University of Hertfordshire's Bayfordbury Observatory with the telescopes Meade LX200 14" and Lumenera Skynyx 2-1

By convention these features are identified on lunar maps by placing the letter on the side of the crater midpoint that is closest to Condorcet.

Condorcet	Coordinates	Diameter
A	11.51°N 67.29°E	15.4 km
D	9.84°N 68.35°E	19.8 km
E	11.35°N 68.16°E	8.0 km
F	8.27°N 73.09°E	39.7 km
G	10.65°N 67.97°E	10.3 km
H	12.45°N 65.08°E	21.0 km
J	13.07°N 65.2°E	16.3 km
L	10.15°N 73.67°E	12.6
M	9.07°N 73.12°E	10.5 km
N	8.98°N 72.61°E	5.0 km
P	8.76°N 70.29°E	48.4 km
Q	11.23°N 73.36°E	35.8 km
R	11.75°N 74.75°E	19.9 km
S	10.67°N 75.64°E	10.2 km
T	11.8°N 65.84°E	14.7 km
TA	12.16°N 65.72°E	14.6 km
U	10.08°N 75.4°E	11.0 km
W	13.94°N 67°E	35.8 km
X	10.12°N 69.95°E	8.9 km
Y	12.86°N 68.92°E	14.2 km

The following craters have been renamed by the IAU.

- Condorcet K — See Wildt (crater).

Condorcet H has a distinct diamond-shaped floor at the bottom. Condorcet A displays evidence of a landslide. Condoret T dates to the Copernican period and has its own ray system.

== Gallery ==
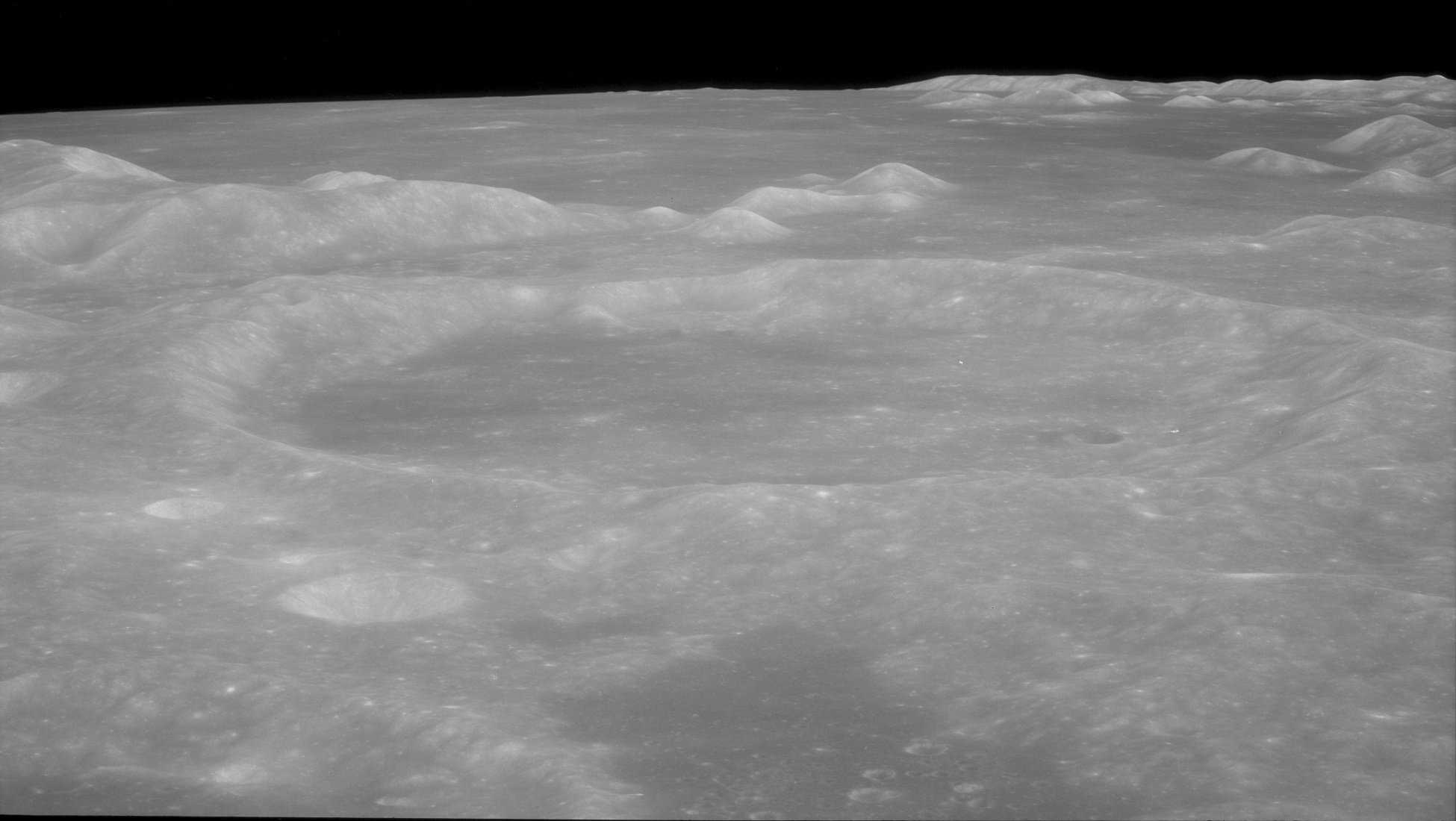
Oblique view from Apollo 11 facing northwest from about 40 km altitude, with Promontorium Agarum at left and Mare Crisium in background

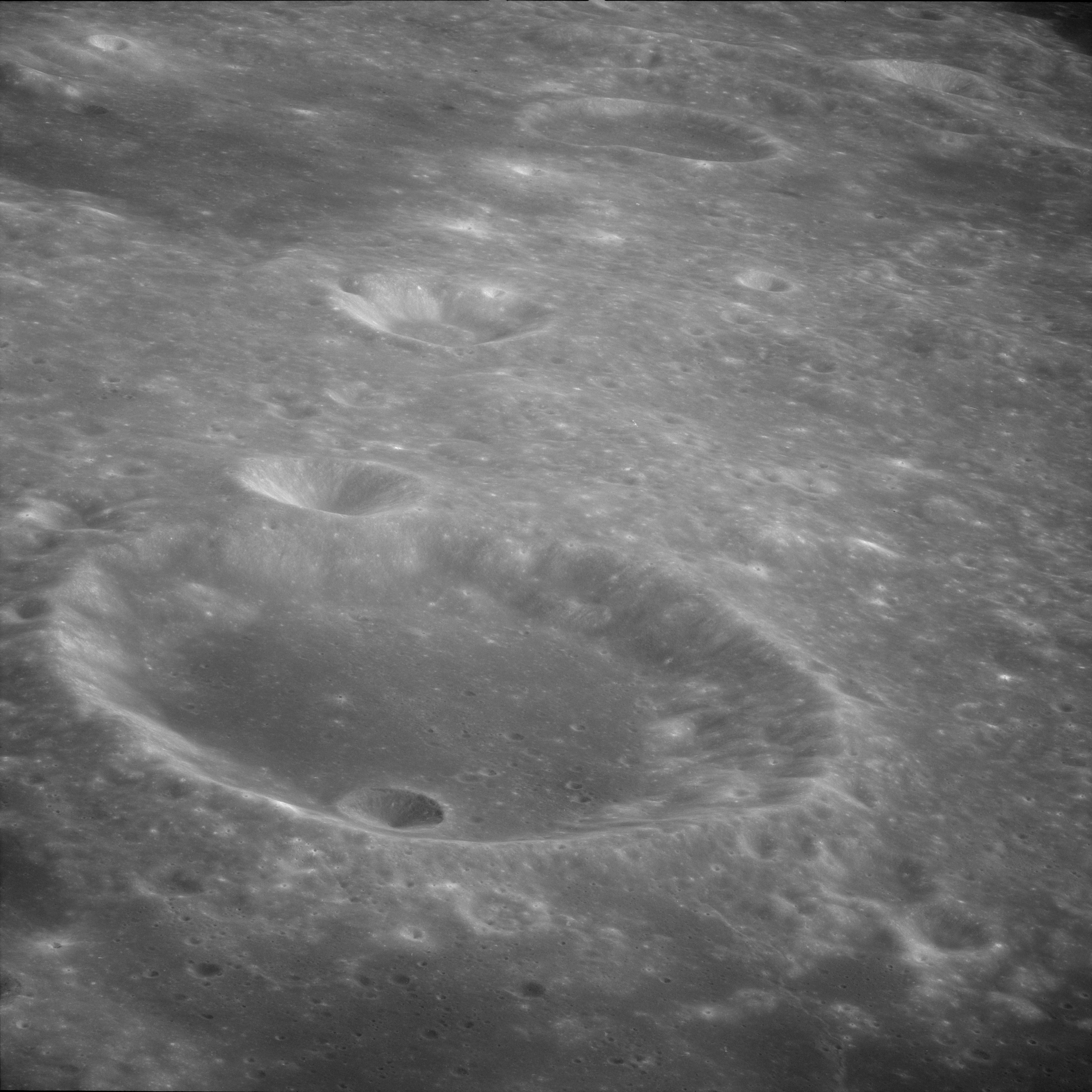
Apollo 11 view of five satellite craters of Condorcet. The large crater in the foreground is F, N is small and left of center, L is above center, Q is a large eroded crater in upper left, and R is a smaller crater above right of L.

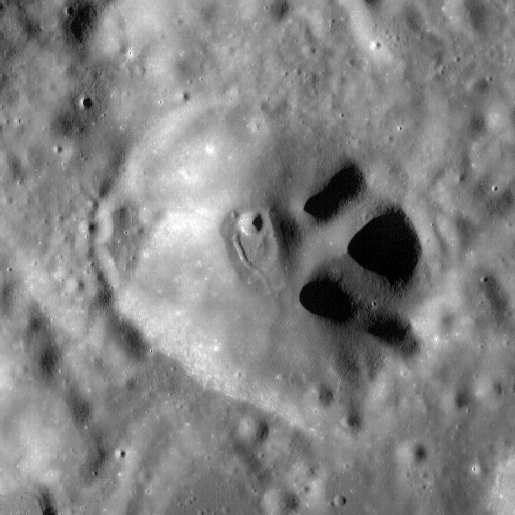
Satellite crater Condorcet D (photo by Lunar Reconnaissance Orbiter).
