= Hubble (surname) =

Hubble is a surname. Notable people with the surname include:

- Brian Hubble (born 1978), American painter and illustrator
- Douglas Vernon Hubble (1900–1981), British physician
- Eddie Hubble (born 1928), American jazz trombonist
- Edwin Hubble (1889–1953), American astronomer
- George Hubble (1858–1906), Australian politician
- Jack Hubble (1881–1965), English cricketer
- Jim Hubble (born 1942), Australian cricketer
- John Hubble (disambiguation)
- Margaret Hubble (1914–2006), British radio broadcaster
- Philip Hubble (born 1960), British swimmer

== Fictional characters ==
- Mildred Hubble, character from The Worst Witch children's book series and television show
