= Henry Wilde =

Henry Wilde may refer to:

- Henry Tingle Wilde (1872–1912), Chief Officer on the RMS Titanic
- Henry Wilde (engineer) (1833–1919), inventor of the self-energising dynamo
