= 1120 Cannonia =

Stony Florian asteroid from the inner regions of the asteroid belt

Discovery
- Discovered by: P. Shajn
- Discovery site: Simeiz Obs.
- Discovery date: 11 September 1928

Designations
- Named after: Annie Jump Cannon (American astronomer)
- Alternative designations: 1928 RV · 1956 AG
- Minor planet category: main-belt · (inner); Flora

Orbital characteristics
- Epoch 4 September 2017 (JD 2458000.5)
- Uncertainty parameter 0
- Observation arc: 74.35 yr (27,155 days)
- Aphelion: 2.5616 AU
- Perihelion: 1.8707 AU
- Semi-major axis: 2.2161 AU
- Eccentricity: 0.1559
- Orbital period (sidereal): 3.30 yr (1,205 days)
- Mean anomaly: 333.96°
- Mean motion: 0° 17^{m} 55.32^{s} / day
- Inclination: 4.0492°
- Longitude of ascending node: 158.67°
- Argument of perihelion: 219.80°

Physical characteristics
- Dimensions: 8.10±1.25 km 9.92±0.70 km 10.184±0.140 km 10.80 km (calculated); 10.80±0.75 km
- Synodic rotation period: 3.79 h (Note: Anonymous submitted period in 2011, with a rotation period 3.79 hours with a brightness amplitude of 0.15 mag and a quality code of 2. Summary figures for (1120) Cannonia at Collaborative Asteroid Lightcurve Link (CALL)); 3.816±0.002 h
- Geometric albedo: 0.129±0.024; 0.1292±0.0240; 0.137±0.021; 0.24 (assumed); 0.263±0.062; 0.49±0.28
- Spectral type: S
- Absolute magnitude (H): 11.90 · 12.00 · 12.25±0.39 · 12.80

1120 Cannonia, provisional designation 1928 RV, is a stony Florian asteroid from the inner regions of the asteroid belt, approximately 10 kilometers in diameter. Discovered by Pelageya Shajn at Simeiz in 1928, it was named after American astronomer Annie Jump Cannon.

== Discovery ==
Cannonia was discovered on 11 September 1928, by Russian astronomer Pelageya Shajn at the Simeiz Observatory on the Crimean peninsula. Two days later, it was independently discovered by Grigory Neujmin (also at Simeiz), and ten days later by Eugène Delporte at Uccle Observatory in Belgium. The independent discoveries, however, are not officially acknowledged by the Minor Planet Center.

== Orbit and classification ==
Cannonia is a member of the Flora family (402), a giant asteroid family and the largest family of stony asteroids in the main-belt. It orbits the Sun in the inner main-belt at a distance of 1.9–2.6 AU once every 3 years and 4 months (1,205 days). Its orbit has an eccentricity of 0.16 and an inclination of 4° with respect to the ecliptic.

The body's observation arc begins unusually late at Uccle in January 1946, or nearly 18 years after its official discovery observation.

== Physical characteristics ==
Cannonia is an assumed stony S-type asteroid, according to its family membership.

=== Rotation period ===
In November 2004, a rotational lightcurve of Cannonia was obtained from photometric observations by American astronomer John Menke at his Menke Observatory in Barnesville, Maryland. Lightcurve analysis gave a well-defined rotation period of 3.816 hours with a brightness amplitude of 0.16 magnitude (U=3). An anonymously submitted lightcurve gave a similar period of 3.79 hours (U=2).

=== Diameter and albedo ===
According to the surveys carried out by the Japanese Akari satellite and the NEOWISE mission of NASA's Wide-field Infrared Survey Explorer, Cannonia measures between 8.1 and 10.8 kilometers in diameter and its surface has an albedo between 0.129 and 0.49.

The Collaborative Asteroid Lightcurve Link assumes a standard albedo of 0.24 – derived from 8 Flora, the largest member and namesake of the Flora family – and calculates a diameter of 10.8 kilometers with an absolute magnitude of 12.0.

== Naming ==
This minor planet was named after American astronomer Annie Jump Cannon (1863–1941), who developed a taxonomic system of stellar spectral types at Harvard University, and subsequently classified about 225,000 stars with these types for the Henry Draper Catalog. The official naming citation was mentioned in The Names of the Minor Planets by Paul Herget in 1955 (H 105). She is also honored by the lunar crater Cannon.
