= Annie Jump Cannon =

American astronomer (1863–1941)

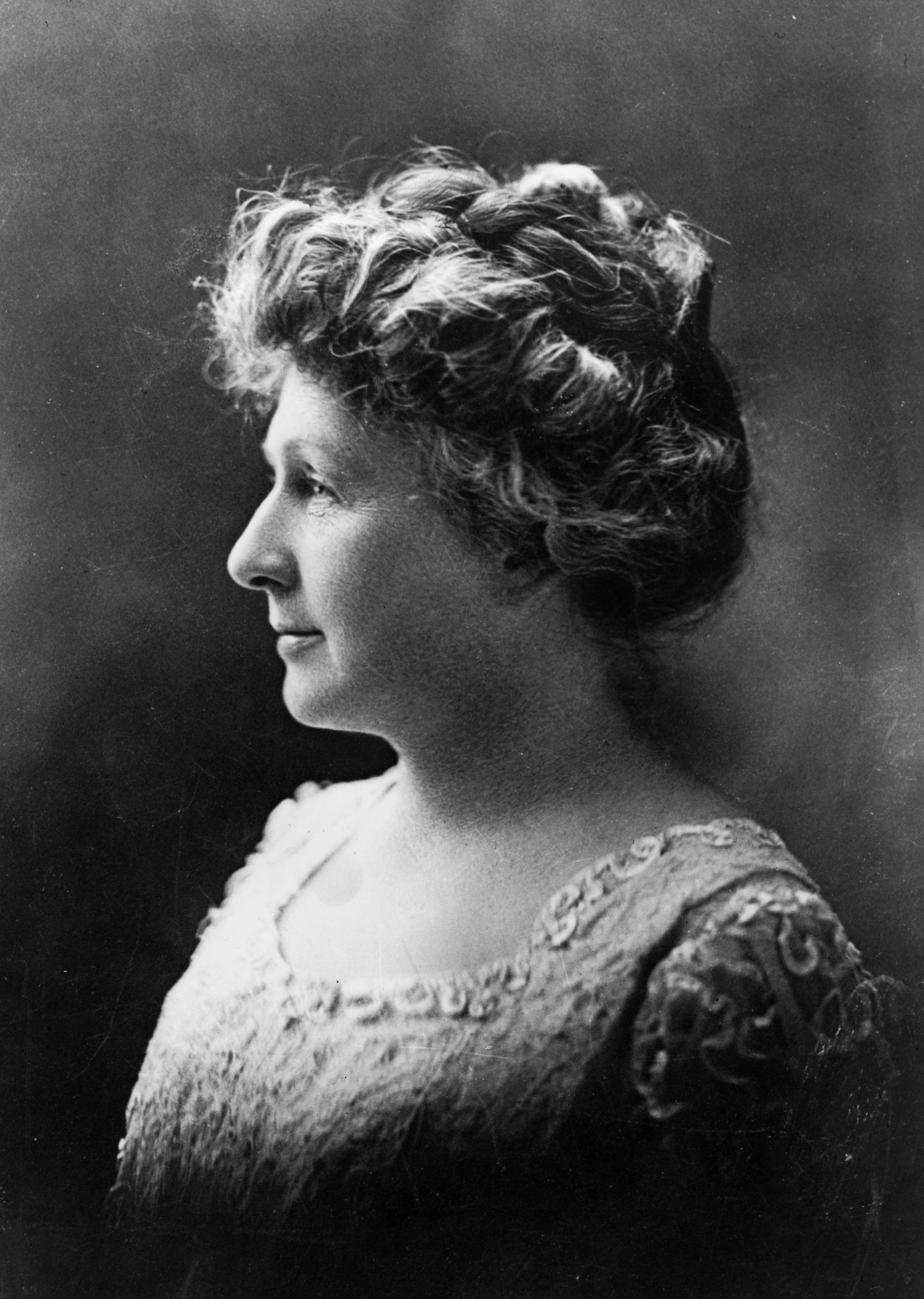
- Cannon in 1922
- Born: December 11, 1863; Dover, Delaware, U.S.
- Died: April 13, 1941 (aged 77); Cambridge, Massachusetts, U.S.
- Education: Wellesley College, Wilmington Conference Academy, Radcliffe College
- Known for: Stellar classification
- Awards: Henry Draper Medal (1931)
- Scientific career
- Fields: Astronomy
- Workplaces: Harvard College Observatory

Annie Jump Cannon (/ˈkænən/; December 11, 1863 – April 13, 1941) was an American astronomer whose cataloging work was instrumental in the development of contemporary stellar classification. With Edward C. Pickering, she is credited with the creation of the Harvard Classification Scheme, which was the first serious attempt to organize and classify stars based on their temperatures and spectral types.

She became nearly deaf after contracting scarlet fever in 1893. She was a suffragist and a member of the National Women's Party.

== Personal life ==
Cannon was born on December 11, 1863, in Dover, Delaware. She was the eldest of three daughters born to Wilson Cannon, a Delaware shipbuilder and state senator, and his second wife, Mary Jump. Cannon's mother was the first person to teach her the constellations and she encouraged her to follow her own interests, suggesting that she pursue studies in mathematics, chemistry, and biology at Wellesley College. Cannon and her mother used an old astronomy textbook to identify stars seen from their attic. Cannon's mother also taught her daughter household economics, which Cannon would later use to organize her research.

Cannon took her mother's advice and pursued her love of astronomy. She lost most of her hearing sometime during her early adult years. Sources vary on the time frame and actual cause, although it is often attributed to scarlet fever. Cannon's personality has been described as "ebullient". She chose not to marry or have children.

== Education (1880–1896) ==
At Wilmington Conference Academy (later known as Wesley College), Cannon was a promising student, particularly in mathematics. In 1880, Cannon was sent to Wellesley College in Massachusetts, one of the top academic schools for women in the US, where she studied physics and astronomy.

Cannon studied under Sarah Frances Whiting, one of the few women physicists in the United States at the time, and went on to become the valedictorian at Wellesley College. She graduated with a degree in physics in 1884 and returned home to Delaware for a decade.

During these years, Cannon developed her skills in the new art of photography. In 1892, she traveled through Europe taking photographs with her Blair box camera. After she returned home her prose and photos from Spain were published in a pamphlet called "In the Footsteps of Columbus", published by the Blair Company and distributed as a souvenir at the Chicago World's Columbian Exposition of 1893.

Soon afterward, Cannon was stricken with scarlet fever that rendered her nearly deaf. This hearing loss made it difficult for Cannon to socialize. As a result, she immersed herself in her work. In 1894, Cannon's mother died and life at home grew more difficult. She wrote to her former instructor at Wellesley, professor Sarah Frances Whiting, to see if there was a job opening. Whiting hired her as a junior physics teacher at the college. This opportunity allowed Cannon to take graduate courses at the college in physics and astronomy. Whiting also inspired Cannon to learn about spectroscopy.

In order to gain access to a better telescope, Cannon enrolled at Radcliffe College in 1894 as a "special student", continuing her studies of astronomy. Radcliffe was set up near Harvard College for Harvard professors to repeat their lectures to the young Radcliffe women. This relationship gave Cannon access to the Harvard College Observatory. In 1896, Edward C. Pickering hired her as his assistant at the Observatory. In 1907, Cannon finished her studies and received her master's degree from Wellesley College.

== Career (1896–1940) ==
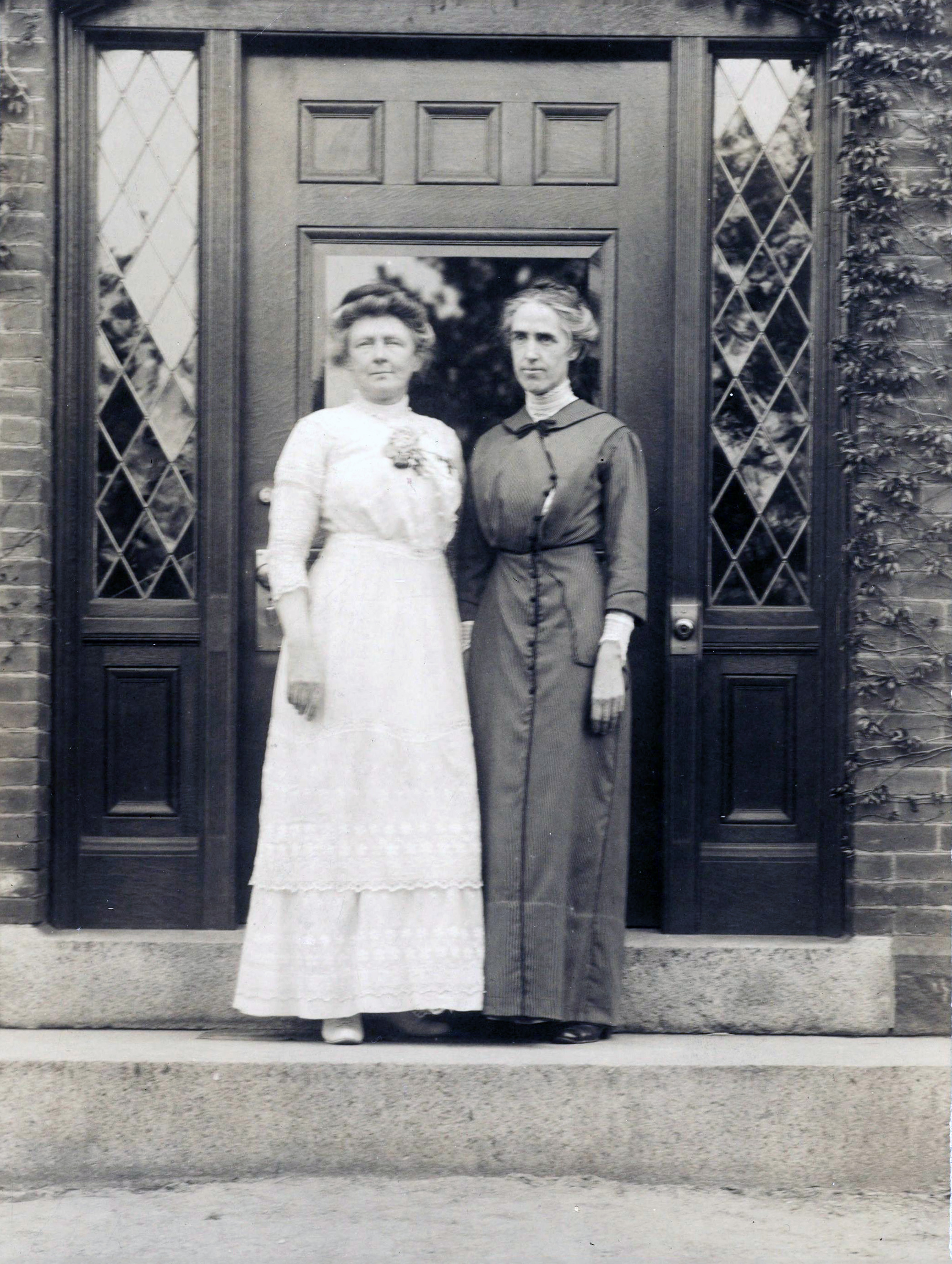
Cannon with Henrietta Swan Leavitt, 1913

Cannon manually classified more stars in a lifetime than anyone else, with a total of around 350,000 stars. She discovered 300 variable stars, five novas, and one spectroscopic binary, creating a bibliography that included about 200,000 references.

In 1896, Cannon became a member of the Harvard Computers, a group of women hired by Harvard Observatory director Edward C. Pickering to complete the Henry Draper Catalogue, with the goal of mapping and defining every star in the sky to a photographic magnitude of about 9. In her notes, she referred to brightness as "Int" which was short for "intensity". In 1927, Pickering said that she was able to classify stars very quickly, "Miss Cannon is the only person in the world - man or woman - who can do this work so quickly." Mary Anna Draper, the widow of wealthy physician and amateur astronomer Henry Draper, had set up a fund to support the work. Men at the laboratory did the labor of operating the telescopes and taking photographs while the women examined the data, carried out astronomical calculations, and cataloged those photographs during the day. Pickering made the Catalogue a long-term project to obtain the optical spectra of as many stars as possible and to index and classify stars by spectra.

When Cannon first started cataloging the stars, she was able to classify 1,000 stars in three years, but by 1913, she was able to work on 200 stars an hour. Cannon could classify three stars a minute just by looking at their spectral patterns and, if using a magnifying glass, could classify stars down to the ninth magnitude, around 16 times fainter than the human eye can see. Her work was also highly accurate.

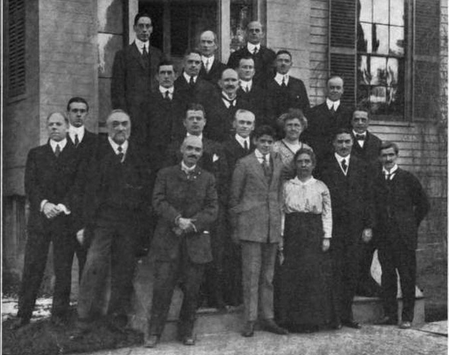
The meeting of the AAVSO at Harvard in 1916. The two women in the photograph are Ida E. Woods (front row) and Cannon (behind Woods).

Not long after work began on the Draper Catalogue, in 1885 a disagreement developed as to how to classify the stars. The analysis was first started by Nettie Farrar, who left a few months later to be married. This left the problem to the ideas of Henry Draper's niece Antonia Maury (who insisted on a complex classification system) and Williamina Fleming (who was overseeing the project for Pickering, and wanted a much more simple, straightforward approach). After Cannon joined the project, she negotiated a compromise: she started by examining the bright southern hemisphere stars. To these stars, she applied a third system, a division of stars into the spectral classes O, B, A, F, G, K, M. Her scheme was based on the strength of the Balmer absorption lines. After absorption lines were understood in terms of stellar temperatures, her initial classification system was rearranged to avoid having to update star catalogs. Her classification system is a compressed and rearranged version of the original alphabetical one.

In 1901, Cannon published her first catalog of stellar spectra. Cannon and the other women at the observatory, including Henrietta Swan Leavitt, Antonia Maury, and Florence Cushman, were criticized at first for being "out of their place" and not being housewives. Women did not commonly rise beyond the level of assistant in this line of work at the time and many were paid only 25 cents an hour to work seven hours a day, six days a week. Leavitt, another woman in the observatory who made significant contributions, shared with Cannon the experience of being deaf. Cannon dominated this field because of her "tidiness" and patience for the tedious work and even helped the men in the observatory gain popularity. Cannon helped broker partnerships and exchanges of equipment between men in the international community and assumed an ambassador-like role outside of it.

In 1911 she was made the Curator of Astronomical Photographs at Harvard. In 1914, she was admitted as an honorary member of the Royal Astronomical Society. In 1921, she became one of the first women to receive an honorary doctorate from a European university when she was awarded an honorary doctor's degree in math and astronomy from Groningen University.

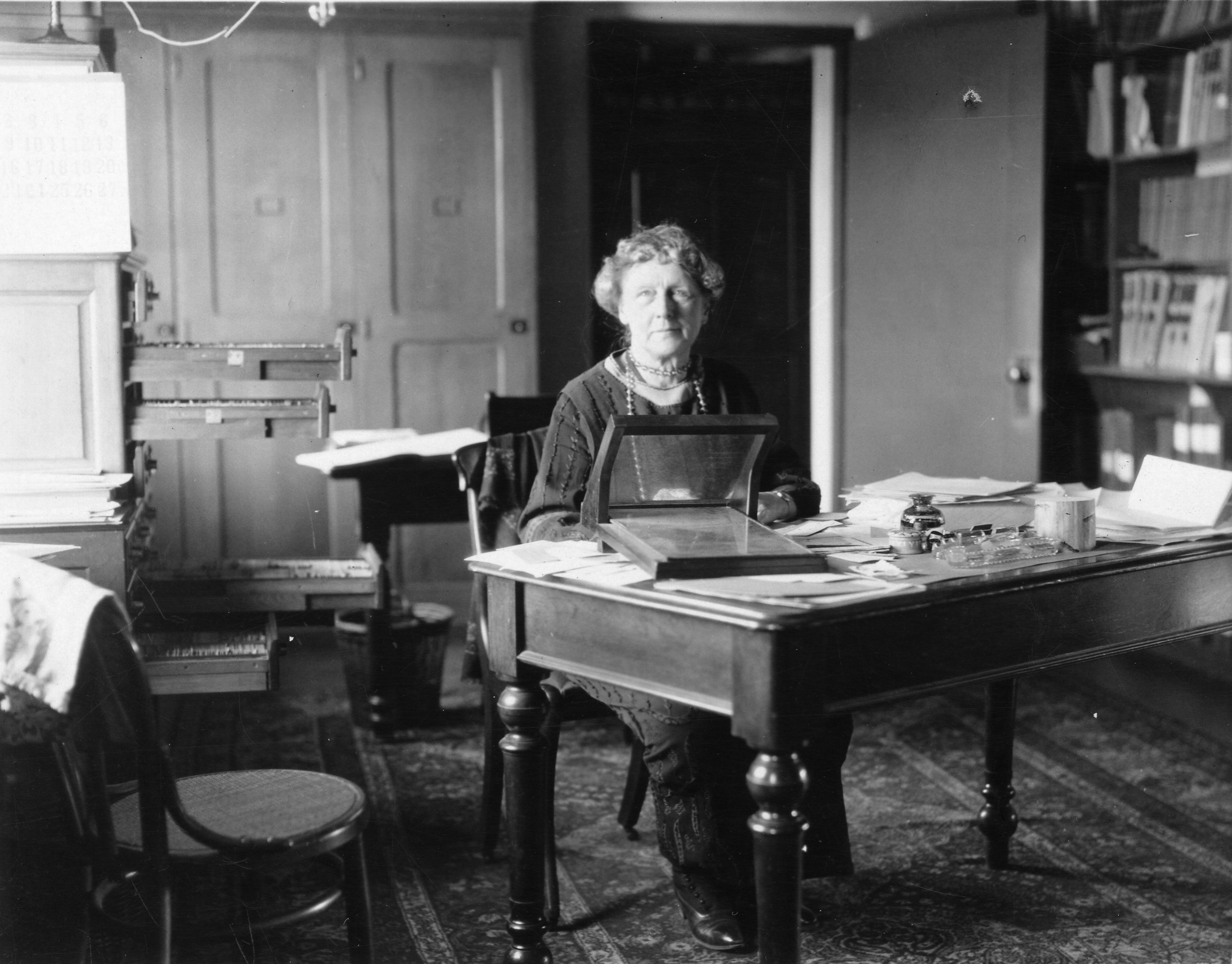
Annie Jump Cannon at her desk at the Harvard College Observatory

On May 9, 1922, the International Astronomical Union passed the resolution to formally adopt Cannon's stellar classification system; with only minor changes, it is still being used for classification today. Also in 1922, Cannon spent six months in Arequipa, Peru, to photograph stars in the Southern hemisphere.

In 1925, she became the first woman to receive an honorary doctorate of science from Oxford University.

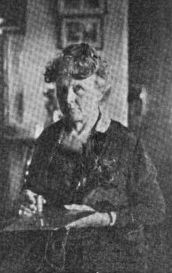
Annie Jump Cannon, 1921

In 1933, she represented professional women at the World's Fair in Chicago (Century of Progress). In 1935, she created the Annie J. Cannon Prize for "the woman of any country, whose contributions to the science of astronomy are the most distinguished."

In 1938, she became the William C. Bond Astronomer at Harvard University.

The astronomer Cecilia Payne collaborated with Cannon and used Cannon's data to show that the stars were composed mainly of hydrogen and helium.

== Later life and death (1940–1941) ==
Annie Jump Cannon's career in astronomy lasted for more than 40 years, until her retirement in 1940. After retirement she continued to actively work on astronomy in the observatory up until a few weeks before she died. During her career, Cannon helped women gain acceptance and respect within the scientific community. Her calm and hardworking attitude and demeanor helped her gain respect throughout her lifetime and paved the path for future women astronomers.

Cannon died on April 13, 1941, in Cambridge, Massachusetts, at the age of 77. She died in a hospital after being ill for more than a month. The American Astronomical Society presents the Annie Jump Cannon Award annually to female astronomers for distinguished work in astronomy.

== Awards and honors ==
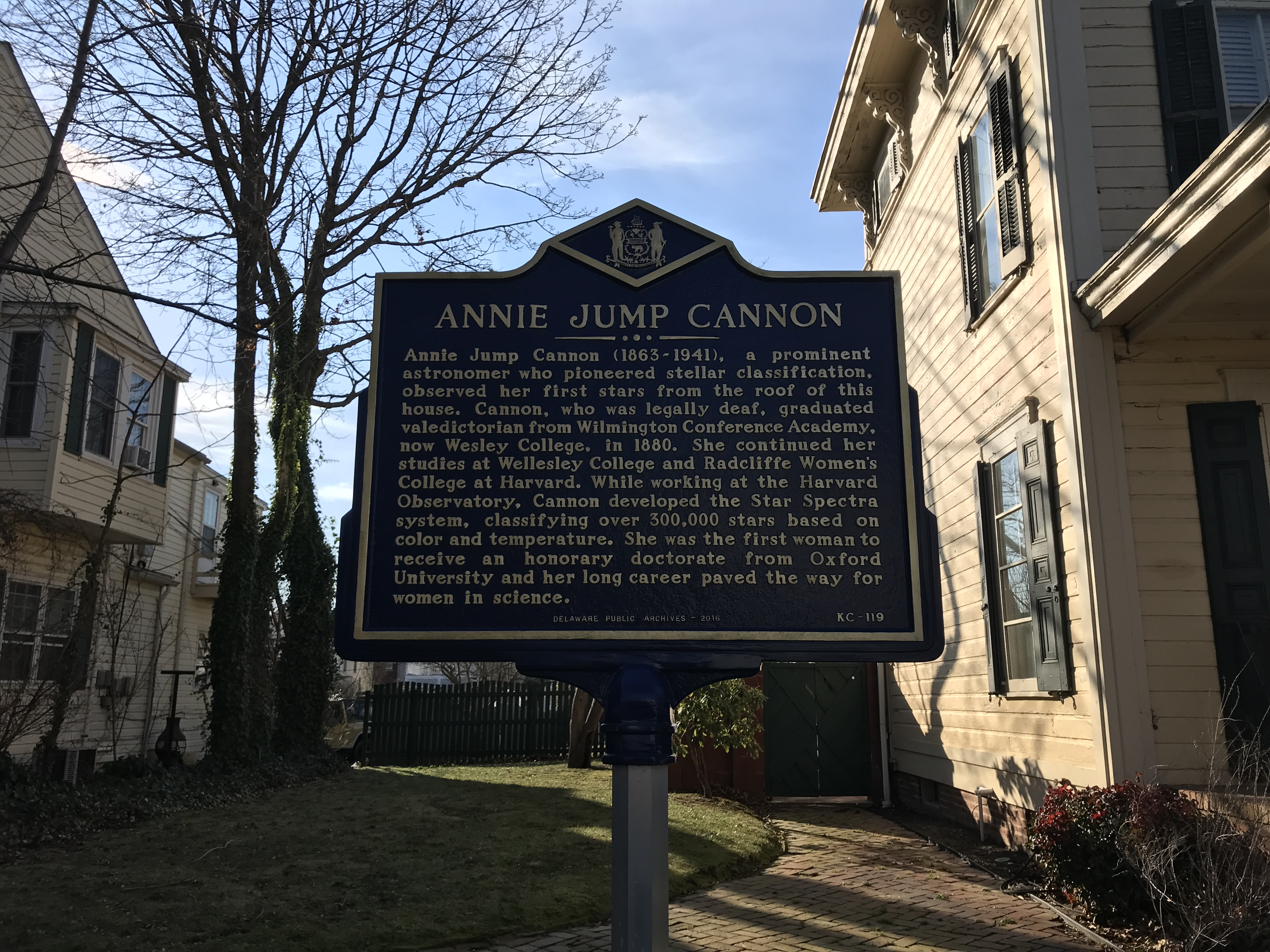
Historical marker noting the building (right) where Cannon first observed stars at Wesley College

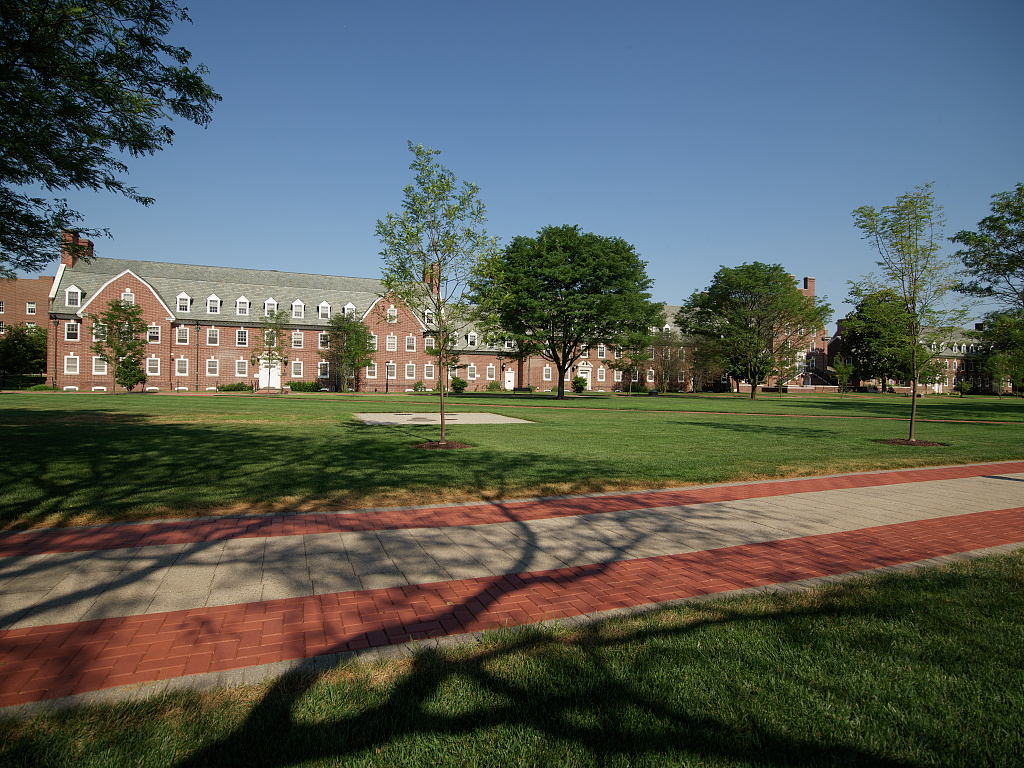
Cannon Hall at the University of Delaware in Newark, Delaware

- 1921, honorary doctorate from the University of Groningen, the Netherlands
- 1925, first woman recipient of an honorary doctorate from Oxford University
- 1925, elected to the American Philosophical Society
- 1929, chosen as one of the "greatest living American women" by the League of Women Voters.
- 1931, first woman to receive the Henry Draper Medal
- 1932, won the Ellen Richards prize from the Association to Aid Scientific Research by Woman
- 1935, received an honorary degree from Oglethorpe University
- First woman elected as officer of the American Astronomical Society
- The lunar crater Cannon is named after her.
- The asteroid 1120 Cannonia is named after her.
- Nicknamed "Census Taker of the Sky" for classifying 300,000 stellar bodies, more than any other person
- The Annie J. Cannon Award in Astronomy named in her honor; awarded since 1934 (now annually) to a woman astronomer in North America.
- Cannon Hall, a residence dormitory at the University of Delaware, named in her honor.
- The Annie Jump Cannon House, was the residence of the President of Wesley College in Dover, Delaware, before the college's acquisition by Delaware State University in July 2021.
- Named Curator of Astronomical Photographs at Harvard.
- Member of the Royal Astronomical Society in Europe.
- Honorary member of Phi Beta Kappa at Wellesley College
- Charter member of the Maria Mitchell Association
- She is among the list of women in the Heritage Floor as part of Judy Chicago's art installation The Dinner Party.
- In 1994, Cannon was inducted into the National Women's Hall of Fame.
- In 2014, a Google Doodle honoring her and her work appeared.
- In 2019, she was depicted on Delaware's American Innovation $1 Coin.

== See also ==
- Bibliography of Annie Jump Cannon
- Harvard Computers
- Henry Draper Catalogue
- "Sisters of the Sun", eighth episode of Cosmos: A Spacetime Odyssey, 2014 American science documentary television series
- Deaf in STEM fields

== Sources ==
- Des Jardins, Julie (2010). The Madame Curie Complex - The Hidden History of Women in Science. New York, NY, US: Feminist Press. ISBN 9781558616554. OCLC 618891417.
- Dvorak, John (August 1, 2013). "The Women Who Created Modern Astronomy". Sky and Telescope. 126 (2): 28–33. Bibcode:2013S&T...126b..28D. ISSN 0037-6604. OCLC 907890766.
- Mack, Pamela (1990). "Straying from their orbits: Women in astronomy in America". In Kass-Simon, G.; Farnes, Patricia; Nash, Deborah (eds.). Women of Science: Righting the Record. Bloomington, IN, US: Indiana University Press. p. 91. ISBN 9780253208132. OCLC 28112853.
- Reynolds, Moira Davison (2004). American Women Scientists: 23 Inspiring Biographies, 1900–2000. Jefferson, NC, US: McFarland. ISBN 9780786421619. OCLC 60686608.
- Sobel, Dava (2016). The Glass Universe: How the Ladies of the Harvard Observatory Took the Measure of the Stars. Penguin. ISBN 9780670016952.
- Welther, Barbara L. (October 1978). "Highlights of an Exhibit to Honor Annie Jump Cannon". The Journal of the American Association of Variable Star Observers. 7 (2): 85–87. Bibcode:1978JAVSO...7...85W.
