= 1953 Rupertwildt =

Main-belt asteroid

Discovery
- Discovered by: Indiana University (Indiana Asteroid Program)
- Discovery site: Goethe Link Obs.
- Discovery date: 29 October 1951

Designations
- Named after: Rupert Wildt (astronomer)
- Alternative designations: 1951 UK · 1929 VC; 1929 WD · 1934 RJ; 1951 WG · 1958 BD
- Minor planet category: main-belt · (outer)

Orbital characteristics
- Epoch 4 September 2017 (JD 2458000.5)
- Uncertainty parameter 0
- Observation arc: 87.14 yr (31,829 days)
- Aphelion: 3.6776 AU
- Perihelion: 2.5416 AU
- Semi-major axis: 3.1096 AU
- Eccentricity: 0.1827
- Orbital period (sidereal): 5.48 yr (2,003 days)
- Mean anomaly: 347.06°
- Mean motion: 0° 10^{m} 46.92^{s} / day
- Inclination: 2.4591°
- Longitude of ascending node: 74.270°
- Argument of perihelion: 326.88°
- T_{Jupiter}: 3.1920

Physical characteristics
- Dimensions: 21.970±0.270; 24 km (est. at 0.06)
- Geometric albedo: 0.070±0.006
- Absolute magnitude (H): 11.9

1953 Rupertwildt, provisionally designated 1951 UK, is an asteroid from the outer region of the asteroid belt, approximately 22 kilometers in diameter. It was discovered on 29 October 1951, by the Indiana Asteroid Program of Indiana University at its Goethe Link Observatory, Indiana, United States, and named after astronomer Rupert Wildt.

== Orbit and classification ==
Rupertwildt orbits the Sun in the outer main-belt at a distance of 2.5–3.7 AU once every 5 years and 6 months (2,003 days). Its orbit has an eccentricity of 0.18 and an inclination of 2° with respect to the ecliptic. Due to a precovery taken at Lowell Observatory in 1929, the asteroid's observation arc begins 22 years before its official discovery observation at Goethe Link.

== Physical characteristics ==
According to the surveys carried out by NASA's Wide-field Infrared Survey Explorer with its subsequent NEOWISE mission, Rupertwildt measures 22.0 kilometers in diameter and its surface has an albedo of 0.070. Assuming an albedo in the range of 0.05 to 0.25, the asteroid measures between 12 and 26 kilometers in diameter, based on an absolute magnitude of 11.9.

=== Lightcurves ===
As of 2017, Rupertwildt's composition, rotation period and shape remain unknown.

== Naming ==
This minor planet was named in memory of German–American astronomer Rupert Wildt (1905–1976), professor of Astronomy at Yale University. In 1966, he was awarded the Eddington Medal by the Royal Astronomical Society for his "discovery of the importance of negative hydrogen ions as a contributor to the solar atmosphere's opacity". He was one of the first to construct a model of the composition of the giant planets, as he recognized that the hydrogen-rich methane (CH_{4}) and ammonia (NH_{3}) are responsible for the absorption bands at red wavelengths. In the 1960s and 1970s, Wildt was chairman, president and the first scientific representative on the board of AURA.

The approved naming citation was published by the Minor Planet Center on 6 June 1982 (M.P.C. 6954). The lunar crater Wildt is also named in his honour.
