= Hansen (crater) =

Crater on the Moon

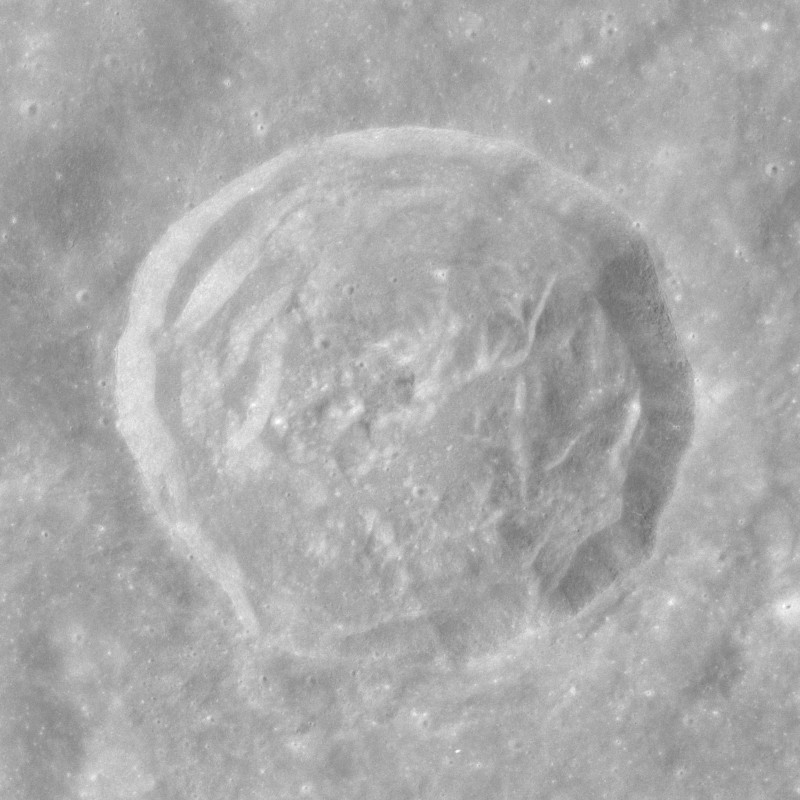
- Apollo 17 image
- Coordinates: 14.0°N 72.5°E
- Diameter: 39 km
- Depth: 1.5 km
- Colongitude: 288° at sunrise
- Eponym: Peter Andreas Hansen

Hansen is a lunar impact crater that is located near the eastern limb of the Moon. It was named after Danish astronomer Peter Andreas Hansen. It lies to the northeast of the larger crater Condorcet, and to the south of the smaller Alhazen.

The outer wall of Hansen is sharp-edged, with a slight outward bulge to the southwest. The inner wall drops downward to a shelf of slumped material, then to a slightly bowl-shaped interior. There is a central peak formation at the midpoint of the interior.

== Satellite craters ==
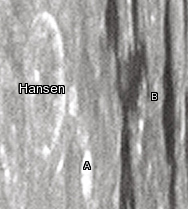
Hansen crater and its satellite craters taken from Earth in 2012 at the University of Hertfordshire's Bayfordbury Observatory with the telescopes Meade LX200 14" and Lumenera Skynyx 2-1

By convention these features are identified on lunar maps by placing the letter on the side of the crater midpoint that is closest to Hansen. All are in the east with the A being closer and the B being further.

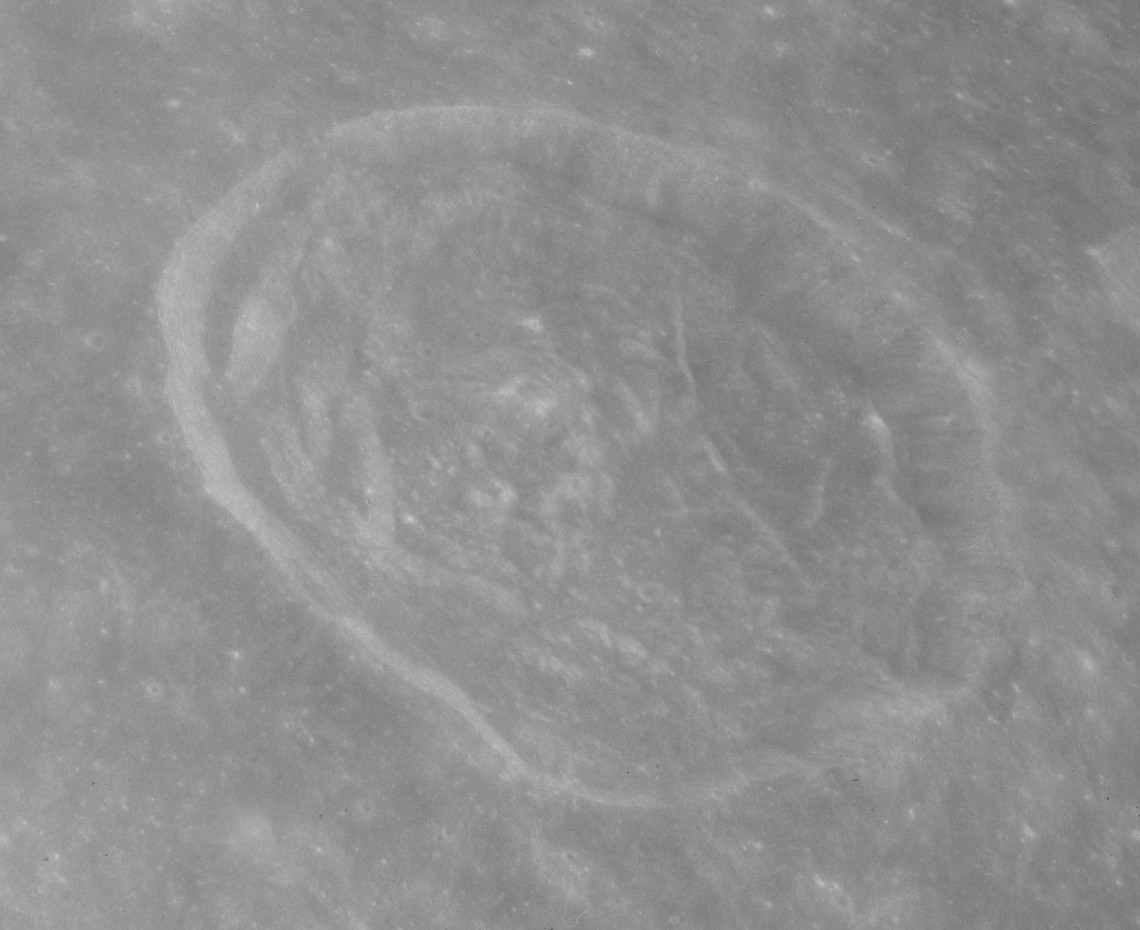
Oblique view also from Apollo 17

Hansen	Latitude	Longitude	Diameter
A	13.3° N	74.3° E	13 km
B	14.3° N	79.9° E	80 km
