= Halley Lectures =

Public lectures at Oxford University

The Halley Lectures are a series of annual public lectures hosted by the University of Oxford, in memory of the astronomer Edmond Halley. Currently, some podcasts of the lectures can be found through the Oxford Physics Public Lectures. These lectures aim to promote public understanding and engagement with science, mathematics, and related fields, and to inspire new generations of researchers and students to pursue careers in these areas. They are often delivered May or June each year at the Sir Martin Wood Lecture Theatre of the Clarendon Laboratory

== History ==
The tradition of the Halley Lecture in the University of Oxford was founded by Henry Wilde for the 1910 return of Halley's comet. By Wilde's direction, it is to be given annually on a subject related to astronomy or terrestrial magnetism. With time, University expanded their scope to interpret astronomy including astrophysics, and terrestrial magnetism to include "and terrestrial magnetism to include "the physics of the external and internal parts of the terrestrial globe" geophysics. The first Halley lecture Celestial ejectamenta. was delivered by Henry Wilde himself on Tuesday, 10 May 1910.

== Purpose ==
The purpose of the Halley Lectures is to bring leading experts in various fields to the University of Oxford, where they can share their knowledge and insights with the public. The lectures aim to promote public understanding and engagement with science and mathematics, and to inspire new generations of researchers and students to pursue careers in these areas.

== Format ==
The Halley Lectures are open to the public and are typically well-attended by people of all ages and backgrounds. Each lecture lasts approximately one hour, and is followed by a Q&A session where the audience can ask questions and engage with the speaker.

== Topics ==
The topics covered in the Halley Lectures are diverse and reflect the wide range of disciplines within science and mathematics that illuminate astronomy, astrophysics, cosmology, cosmogenesis, exobiology, and earth science. Selection of lecturers is made based on timeliness of the topic, their expertise and contributions to their respective fields.

== Chronology of Halley Lectures ==
Date	Lecturer	Title
27 October 2022	Amina Helmi	Dynamics and History of the Milky Way
8 May 2019	Marc Kamionkowski	Is Dark Matter Made of Black Holes
22 May 2018	Adam Showman	Weather on Remote Worlds
7 June 2017	Rainer Weiss	Observation of the mergers of binary black holes: The opening of gravitational wave astronomy
8 June 2016	Scott Tremaine	The origin and structure of the solar system comet cloud
19 June 2015	Peter J. Webster	Understanding the Monsoon
13 June 2014	Eliot Quataert	From Smooth to Lumpy—the Physics of Galaxy Formation
29 May 2013	Ewine van Dishoeck	Building stars, planets and the ingredients for life between the stars
14 June 2012	Susan Solomon	The World's Chemistry in Our Hands: Global Environmental Challenges Past and Future
11 March 2011	Michel Mayor	Other Worlds in the Universe? The Quest for Earth Twins
25 May 2010	Brian Schmidt	The Accelerating the Universe
24 April 2008	George Smoot	The History and Fate of the Universe
23 May 2007	Ron Ekers	Paths to Discovery in Radioastronomy -Prediction and Serendipity
21 May 1985	Malcolm Longair	Universe - present, past and future
23 May 1972	Subrahmanyan Chandrasekhar	The increasing role of general relativity in astronomy
4 June 1976	Charles H Townes	Interstellar molecules
16 May 1962	Hermann Bondi	Physics and Cosmology
6 May 1955	Martin Ryle	Radio stars and their cosmological significance
1 May 1951	Jan Oort	Origin and development of comets
16 May 1950	Edward Bullard	The origin of the Earth's magnetic field
12 May 1948	Fritz Zwicky	Morphological Astronomy
3 June 1941	William Marshall Smart	Sea and Air Navigation
16 May 1940	Fritz Paneth	The origin of meteorites
5 June 1939	Harold Spencer Jones	The earth as a clock
16 June 1938	Armin Otto Leuschner	The minor planets of the Hecuba group
28 May 1937	Basil Schonland	The lightning discharge
5 June 1935	John Stanley Plaskett	The dimensions and structure of the galaxy.
8 May 1934	Edwin Hubble	Red-shifts in the spectra of nebulae
1 June 1933	Henry Norris Russell	The composition of the stars
19 May 1932	Arthur Milne	The white dwarf stars
30 May 1930	Arthur Eddington	The Rotation of the Galaxy
31 May 1929	Gilbert Walker	Some problems of Indian Meteorology
20 May 20, 1927	Frank Stratton	Modern eclipse problems
28 May 1924	John Joly	Radioactivity and the Surface History of the Earth
17 May 1923	George Simpson	Scott's Polar Journey and the Weather
23 May 1922	Harold Jeffreys	The Nebular Hypothesis and Modern Cosmogony
17 May 1921	John Knight Fotheringham	Historical Eclipses
12 June 1920	Ralph Allen Sampson	On Gravitation and Relativity
22 May 1913	Louis Agricola Bauer	The Earth's Magnetism
10 May 1910	Henry Wilde	Celestial ejectamenta
