= John Hubbell =

John Hubbell may refer to:

- Don Lorenzo Hubbell (1853–1930), born John Lorenzo Hubbell, trader, politician
- John H. Hubbell (1925–2007), radiation physicist
- John Raymond Hubbell (1879–1954), composer
- John Hubbell (figure skater) (born 1948), Canadian pair skater
- John W. Hubbell American bridge player
- John Hubbell (shot putter) (born 1948), American shot putter, 1969 All-American for the Washington Huskies track and field team

== See also ==
- John Hubble (disambiguation)
