= Deaf in STEM fields =

The deaf/Deaf and hard-of-hearing (DHH) population is underrepresented in science, technology, engineering, and math fields (STEM), despite a history of excellence in these fields. The lack of standard American Sign Language (ASL) vocabulary, engaging hands-on learning environments, and DHH mentors seems to contribute largely to the discrepancy.

== History ==
DHH scientists, inventors, engineers, and mathematicians have contributed greatly to the world. The field of astronomy, in particular, has been blessed with many DHH scholars who have immensely advanced the field, including Robert Aitken, Annie Jump Cannon, John Goodricke, Olaf Hassel, and Henrietta Swan Leavitt. Konstantin Tsiolkovsky was one of the founding fathers of astronautics and rocketry. In addition, the Gallaudet Eleven were Deaf research subjects in the 1950s and 1960s, essential for NASA's study of the effects of weightlessness on humans.

== DHH statistics in STEM ==
The DHH population in the U.S. has fewer associate's and bachelor's degrees than their hearing peers (27.7% vs. 43.3% for associate degrees, 18.8% vs. 34% for bachelor's degrees), and this gap has persisted for the last decade across ages, genders, and races. The difference seems due to lower rates of entry into associate's and bachelor's programs, since DHH students complete their bachelor's degrees at rates similar to their hearing peers. From 2001 through 2010, only 0.17% of the doctorate degrees given in the U.S. were to DHH students. This number increased to 1.2% by 2014. Employment rates for DHH graduates also lag behind their hearing peers, particularly in science and engineering fields. Approximately 2.8% of scientists and engineers employed in the U.S. in 2019 reported having a moderate or severe hearing disability.

== ASL STEM vocabulary ==
One obstacle for the DHH population is the limited standard ASL vocabulary of STEM concepts. Because these signs develop in different locations, many different signs are often given for the same word or concept. For example, the sign for "protein" has at least five different signs in the various databases listed below. This makes both communication and education in their native language difficult for the DHH population in STEM fields.

Efforts headed by Harry G. Lang began in the 1970s to catalog STEM signs for use in education through the NTID Technical Signs Project, which became the NTID Science Signs Lexicon. The database is no longer accessible to the public, but NTID has since established both ASLCORE and the DeafTEC STEM dictionary. Several other databases have also emerged, including ASL CLeaR, the ASL STEM Forum, and the TERC Signing Math and Science Dictionaries. The Atomic Hands website acts as a clearinghouse for these databases and for ASL STEM curriculum, in addition to producing their own ASL STEM videos and a networking database for Deaf STEM professionals.

Previous research on ASL STEM vocabulary determined standard signs were more likely to be used by teachers in science classes if they accurately depicted scientific concepts, but invented signs showed no patterns of preference.

== DHH STEM education ==
Many studies have suggested that hands-on, inquiry-based learning is ideal for DHH students since traditional teaching methods rely heavily on lectures and printed materials such as textbooks, which may be more difficult to process for DHH students who are native signers.

A 2018 study with Gallaudet STEM majors found that Deaf students had better undergraduate research experiences with hearing mentors when they educated their colleagues about Deaf culture, strongly advocated for themselves, had mentors that were willing to work closely with them, and worked with other Deaf students.
