= Bibliography of Annie Jump Cannon =

Annie Jump Cannon (1863–1941) was a prominent American astronomer.

== Bibliography ==
- Pickering, Edward Charles (1918). Henry Draper Catalogue. Annals of the Astronomical Observatory of Harvard College. Cambridge, Massachusetts: Astronomical Observatory of Harvard College. LCCN 18018382. OCLC 809461762.
  - Available in an "updated, corrected, and extended machine-readable version" at "Henry Draper Catalogue and Extension (Cannon+ 1918–1924; ADC 1989)". VizieR archives. Strasbourg, France: Centre de données astronomiques de Strasbourg [Strasbourg Astronomical Data Center].
  - Online from Harvard University at "The SAO/NASA Astrophysics Data System".; abstracts link to GIF and PDF formats.
    - Cannon, Annie J.; Pickering, Edward C. (1918). "The Henry Draper catalogue 0h, 1h, 2h, and 3h". Annals of Harvard College Observatory. 91: 1. Bibcode:1918AnHar..91....1C.
    - Cannon, Annie Jump; Pickering, Edward Charles (1918). "The Henry Draper catalogue : 4h, 5h and 6h". Annals of Harvard College Observatory. 92: 1. Bibcode:1918AnHar..92....1C.
    - Cannon, Annie Jump; Pickering, Edward Charles (1918). "The Henry Draper catalogue : 7h and 8h". Annals of Harvard College Observatory. 93: 1. Bibcode:1919AnHar..93....1C.
    - Cannon, Annie Jump; Pickering, Edward Charles (1918). "The Henry Draper catalogue : 9h, 10h, and 11h". Annals of Harvard College Observatory. 94: 1. Bibcode:1919AnHar..94....1C.
    - Cannon, Annie Jump; Pickering, Edward Charles (1918). "The Henry Draper catalogue : 12h, 13h, and 14h". Annals of Harvard College Observatory. 95: 1. Bibcode:1920AnHar..95....1C.
    - Cannon, Annie Jump; Pickering, Edward Charles (1918). "The Henry Draper catalogue : 15h and 16h". Annals of Harvard College Observatory. 96: 1. Bibcode:1921AnHar..96....1C.
    - Cannon, Annie Jump; Pickering, Edward Charles (1918). "The Henry Draper catalogue : 17h and 18h". Annals of Harvard College Observatory. 97: 1. Bibcode:1922AnHar..97....1C.
    - Cannon, Annie Jump; Pickering, Edward Charles (1918). "The Henry Draper catalogue : 19h and 20h". Annals of Harvard College Observatory. 98: 1. Bibcode:1923AnHar..98....1C.
    - Cannon, Annie Jump; Pickering, Edward Charles (1918). "The Henry Draper catalogue : 21h, 22h, and 23h". Annals of Harvard College Observatory. 99: 1. Bibcode:1924AnHar..99....1C.
- —— (1923). "The spectrum of Nova Aquilae". Annals of the Astronomical Observatory of Harvard College. 81 (3): 179. Bibcode:1923AnHar..81..179C. OCLC 786374390.
- —— (1916). "Spectra having bright lines". Annals of the Astronomical Observatory of Harvard College. 76 (3): 19. Bibcode:1916AnHar..76...19C. OCLC 786374401.
- —— (1912). "Comparison of objective prism and slit spectrograms". Annals of the Astronomical Observatory of Harvard College. 56 (8): 251. Bibcode:1912AnHar..56..251C. OCLC 786374385.
- —— (1912). "The spectra of 745 double stars". Annals of the Astronomical Observatory of Harvard College. 56 (7): 227. Bibcode:1912AnHar..56..227C. OCLC 786374368.
- —— (1912). "Classification of 1,688 southern stars by means of their spectra". Annals of the Astronomical Observatory of Harvard College. 56 (5): 115. Bibcode:1912AnHar..56..115C. OCLC 786363259.
- —— (1912). "Classification of 1,477 stars by means of their photographic spectra". Annals of the Astronomical Observatory of Harvard College. 56 (4): 65. Bibcode:1912AnHar..56...65C. OCLC 786374355.
- ——; Pickering, Edward Charles (1909). "Maxima and minima of variable stars of long period". Annals of the Astronomical Observatory of Harvard College. 55 (pt. 2): 95. Bibcode:1909AnHar..55...95C. OCLC 786370272.
- ——; Pickering, Edward Charles (1907). "Second catalogue of variable stars". Annals of the Astronomical Observatory of Harvard College. 55 (pt. 1): 1. Bibcode:1907AnHar..55....1C. OCLC 603459862.
- —— (1903). "A provisional catalogue of variable stars". Annals of the Astronomical Observatory of Harvard College. 48 (3): 91. Bibcode:1903AnHar..48...91P. OCLC 786370792.
- ——; Pickering, Edward Charles (1901). "Spectra of bright southern stars photographed with the 13-inch Boyden telescope as a part of the Henry Draper Memorial". Annals of the Astronomical Observatory of Harvard College. 28 (pt. 2): 129. Bibcode:1901AnHar..28..129C. OCLC 786363059.
