= Wildt (crater) =

Crater on the Moon

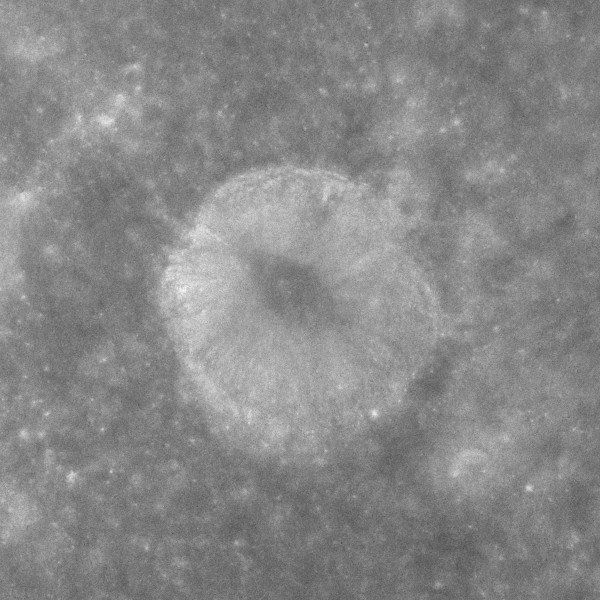
- Apollo 17 image
- Coordinates: 9.0°N 75.8°E
- Diameter: 11 km
- Depth: unknown
- Colongitude: 285° at sunrise
- Eponym: Rupert Wildt

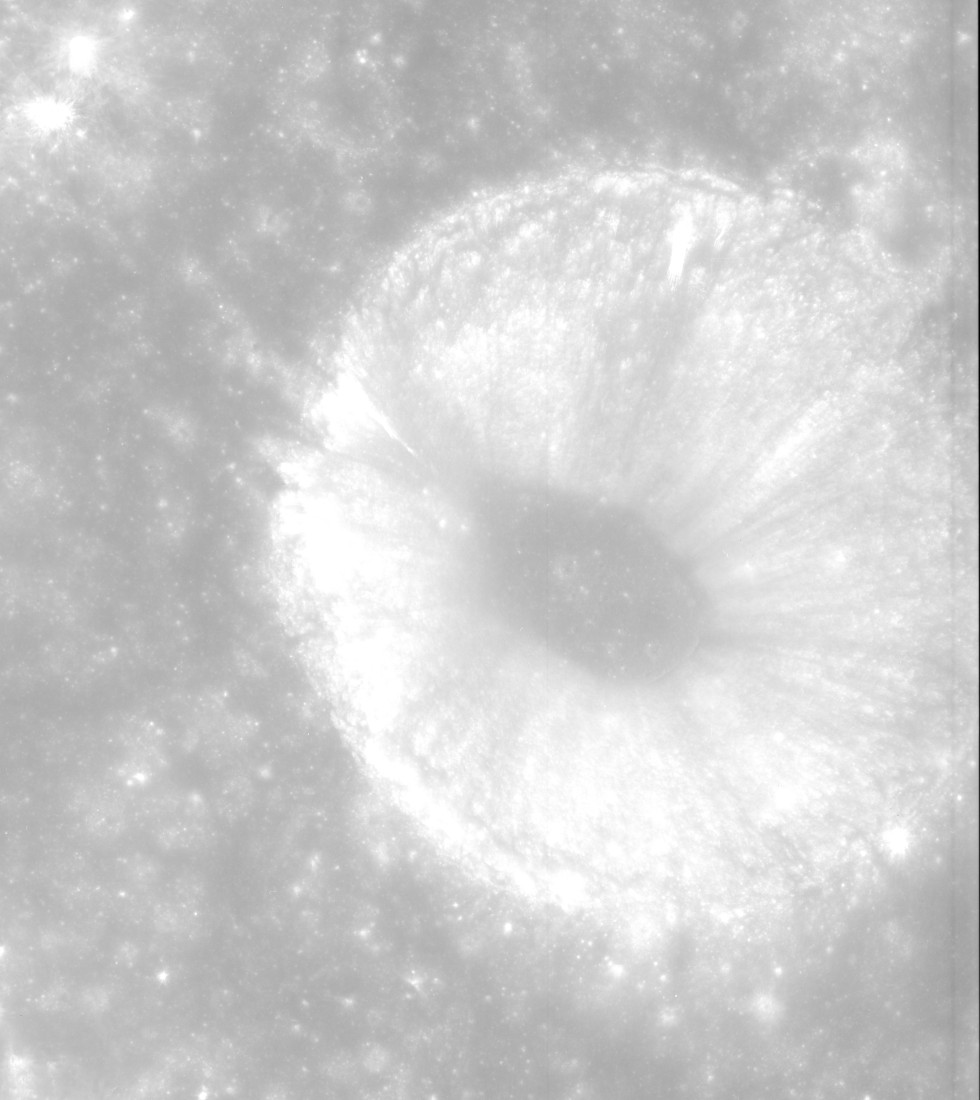
Slightly oblique view from Apollo 15

Wildt is a small lunar impact crater that is located near the eastern limb of the Moon. It was named after German-American astronomer Rupert Wildt. It was previously designated Condorcet K. The nearest named crater is Condorcet to the west-northwest. The crater is circular and bowl-shaped, with a small floor at the midpoint of the sloping interior walls. It has not received significant wear from subsequent impacts.

== See also ==
- 1953 Rupertwildt, main-belt asteroid
