= Plutarch (crater) =

Lunar impact crater

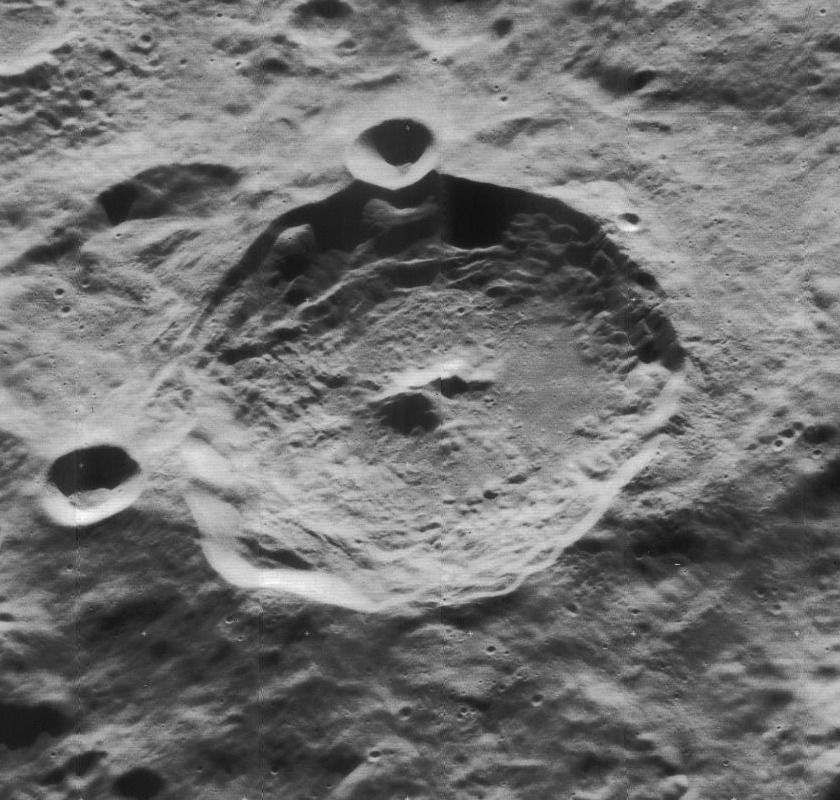
- Oblique Lunar Orbiter 4 image
- Coordinates: 24.1°N 79.0°E
- Diameter: 68 km
- Depth: 2.8 km
- Colongitude: 282° at sunrise
- Eponym: Plutarch

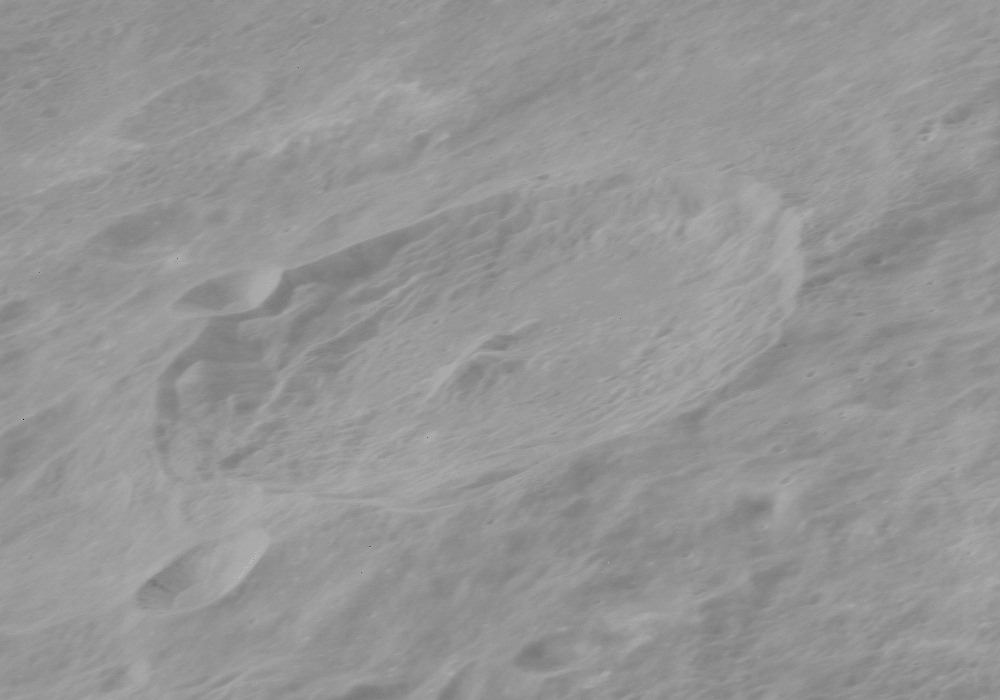
Oblique Apollo 16 image

Plutarch is a lunar impact crater that lies near the north-northeastern limb of the Moon, just to the south of the irregular crater Seneca. To the southeast is the flooded crater Cannon. The proximity of this crater to the limb causes it to appear foreshortened when viewed from the Earth, but it is actually a circular formation.

This formation dates to the Eratosthenian epoch of the lunar geologic timescale. It has a well-defined rim edge that is only slightly eroded. A small crater intrudes slightly into the southwestern rim, and another small crater lies near the south-southeastern rim. The inner wall is unusually wide in the southern half of the crater, with the narrowest section along the northern rim. Slumping and terraces formed along the inner sides, and a notable central peak near the midpoint of the interior floor.

The extension of the southwestern ejectaray from farside crater Giordano Bruno runs south of Plutarch, toward the eastern rim of Mare Crisium and Alhazen. During favourable libration it is possible to observe this extension. It is also noticeable on the photographic version of chart LAC 45 (page 90) in The Clementine Atlas of the Moon (Ben Bussey / Paul D. Spudis).

== Satellite craters ==
By convention these features are identified on lunar maps by placing the letter on the side of the crater midpoint that is closest to Plutarch.

Plutarch	Latitude	Longitude	Diameter
C	23.1° N	71.0° E	11 km
D	24.3° N	75.7° E	15 km
F	23.5° N	73.5° E	12 km
G	23.0° N	75.2° E	11 km
H	24.4° N	72.7° E	11 km
K	25.1° N	72.8° E	11 km
L	25.8° N	71.6° E	8 km
M	23.8° N	77.6° E	11 km
N	23.8° N	77.1° E	12 km
