= Rupert Wildt =

American astronomer

- Born: June 25, 1905; Munich, German Empire
- Died: January 9, 1976 (age 70); Orleans, Massachusetts
- Citizenship: American
- Education: University of Berlin
- Awards: Eddington Medal (1966)
- Scientific career
- Fields: astronomy

Rupert Wildt (/ˈvɪlt/; June 25, 1905 – January 9, 1976) was an American astronomer.

He was born in Munich, Germany, and grew up in that country during World War I and its aftermath. In 1927 he was awarded a Ph.D. from the University of Berlin. He joined the University of Göttingen, specializing in the properties of atmospheres.

In 1932 he studied the spectra of Jupiter, and other outer planets, and identified certain absorption bands as belonging to the hydrogen-rich compounds of methane and ammonia. The composition appeared consistent with a composition similar to the sun and other stars.

Assuming that the atmosphere was composed of these gases, during the 1940s and 1950s he constructed a model of the structure of these planets. He believed the core of the planets is solid and composed of a mixture of rock and metal, covered by a thick outer shell of ice, overlaid by a dense atmosphere. His model is still widely accepted.

In 1934 he emigrated to the United States, and became a research assistant at Princeton University from 1937 until 1942. He then became an assistant professor at the University of Virginia until 1947, before joining the faculty of the Yale University.

In 1937 he proposed that the atmosphere of Venus was composed of a mist of formaldehyde. His observations of the atmosphere did not find any water at the time, but later balloon-based measurements did show water in the atmosphere and so his proposal was abandoned. In 1940, however, he also hypothesized that the carbon dioxide in the Venusian atmosphere trapped heat, a phenomenon later called the greenhouse effect.

In 1939 he demonstrated that the major source of optical opacity in the Sun's atmosphere is the H^{−} ion, and thus the main source of visible light for the Sun and stars.

From 1965 until 1968 he was president of the Association of Universities for Research in Astronomy. In the period 1966-1968 he also held the post of the chairman of the department of astronomy at Yale, and from 1973 until his death he was professor emeritus. He died in Orleans, Massachusetts.

== Awards and honors ==
- Awarded the Eddington Medal in 1966
- Asteroid 1953 Rupertwildt is named after him
- The crater Wildt on the Moon is named after him
