= Justice Hubbell =

Justice Hubbell may refer to:

- Levi Hubbell (1808–1876), associate justice of the Wisconsin Supreme Court
- Webster Hubbell (born 1948), chief justice of the Arkansas Supreme Court
