= 2069 Hubble =

Asteroid

Discovery
- Discovered by: Indiana University (Indiana Asteroid Program)
- Discovery site: Goethe Link Obs.
- Discovery date: 29 March 1955

Designations
- Named after: Edwin Hubble (astronomer)
- Alternative designations: 1955 FT · 1953 VN_{1} 1969 TB_{1} · 1970 WA_{1} 1975 TT_{3}
- Minor planet category: main-belt · (outer)

Orbital characteristics
- Epoch 4 September 2017 (JD 2458000.5)
- Uncertainty parameter 0
- Observation arc: 62.22 yr (22,727 days)
- Aphelion: 3.7484 AU
- Perihelion: 2.5729 AU
- Semi-major axis: 3.1606 AU
- Eccentricity: 0.1860
- Orbital period (sidereal): 5.62 yr (2,052 days)
- Mean anomaly: 81.951°
- Mean motion: 0° 10^{m} 31.44^{s} / day
- Inclination: 9.1064°
- Longitude of ascending node: 46.406°
- Argument of perihelion: 70.185°

Physical characteristics
- Dimensions: 34.44 km (derived); 34.53±2.3 km 38.471±0.151 km 39.54±10.25 km 40.10±0.84 km 40.615±0.281 km 45.82±12.40 km 46.92±16.56 km
- Synodic rotation period: 32.52±0.02 h
- Geometric albedo: 0.024±0.023; 0.03±0.01; 0.03±0.05; 0.0389±0.0095; 0.040±0.002; 0.0410 (derived); 0.043±0.010; 0.0538±0.008
- Spectral type: C
- Absolute magnitude (H): 11.1 · 11.27±0.20 · 11.30 · 11.32 · 11.4 · 11.48

2069 Hubble, provisional designation 1955 FT, is a carbonaceous asteroid from the outer region of the asteroid belt, approximately 40 kilometers in diameter. It was discovered on 29 March 1955, by the Indiana Asteroid Program at Goethe Link Observatory, United States, and named after American astronomer Edwin Hubble.

== Orbit ==
Hubble orbits the Sun in the outer main-belt at a distance of 2.6–3.7 AU once every 5 years and 7 months (2,052 days). Its orbit has an eccentricity of 0.19 and an inclination of 9° with respect to the ecliptic. Its first unused observations, 1953 VN1, was made at Goethe Link in 1953. The body's observation arc begins at NAOJ's Mitaka Campus, 8 days prior to its official discovery observation at Goethe Link.

== Physical characteristics ==
=== Lightcurve ===
In January 2005, American astronomer Brian Warner obtained a rotational lightcurve of Hubble from photometric observations taken at his Palmer Divide Observatory in Colorado. Lightcurve analysis showed an unusual tri-modal lightcurve with a rotation period of 32.52 hours and a brightness variation of 0.10 in magnitude. (Note: Warner (2005) Lightcurve plot of 2069 Hubble with a rotation period 32.52±0.02 hours with a brightness amplitude of 0.10 magnitude) While not being a slow rotator, Hubble has a longer than average spin rate, as the vast majority of asteroids rotate between 2.2 and 20 hours once around their axis.

=== Diameter and albedo ===
According to the surveys carried out by the Infrared Astronomical Satellite IRAS, the Japanese Akari satellite, and NASA's Wide-field Infrared Survey Explorer with its subsequent NEOWISE mission, Hubble measures between 34.53 and 46.92 kilometers in diameter, and its surface has an albedo between 0.024 and 0.0538. The Collaborative Asteroid Lightcurve Link classifies it as a carbonaceous C-type asteroid, derives an albedo of 0.041 and a shorter diameter of 34.44 kilometers with an absolute magnitude of 11.4.

== Naming ==
This minor planet was named after the famous American astronomer Edwin Hubble (1889–1953). He pioneered in the exploration of the Universe beyond the Milky Way galaxy and established a self-consistent distance scale as far as the 100-inch Hooker Telescope at Mount Wilson Observatory could reach. Hubble's law and the discovery of the expanding Universe were his greatest achievements. His classification scheme for galaxies, the Hubble sequence, is still the standard and often called the Hubble tuning-fork. Hubble also discovered the minor planet 1373 Cincinnati, his only asteroid discovery. The lunar crater Hubble is also named after him. The approved naming citation was published by the Minor Planet Center on 20 December 1983 (M.P.C. 8403).
