= John Hubble =

John Hubble may refer to:

- John Hubble (cricketer) (1881–1965), English cricketer
- Eddie Hubble (John Edgar Hubble II, 1928–2016), American jazz trombonist

== See also ==
- John Hubbell (disambiguation)
