= Hubbell Center =

U.S. museum, library, and archive

Coordinates: 41.57790°N 93.62378°W

The Hubble Family Historical Society

The Hubbell Center is the museum, library, and archive of the Hubbell family in North America.

== Description ==
The Hubbell Center is a tax-exempt not-for-profit corporation under Section 501(c)(3) of the Internal Revenue Code. Its mission is to preserve, protect, and display the history and artifacts of the descendants of Richard Hubball, and make them accessible to the family and others across the world. Richard Hubbell was born in 1626 in Bewdley, England, and since his arrival in the New Haven Colony, his descendants have migrated widely in the US and Canada, as well as many foreign countries. The inspiration for the Hubbell Center came about through discussion among Clifton Howells Hubbell, Donald Clayton Hubbell, James Windsor Hubbell, Jr., Jack Jerome Hubbell, and Harold Berresford Hubbell, Jr., a longtime Hubbell researcher and co-founder (with Donald Sidney Hubbell) of The Hubbell Family Historical Society (THFHS). The center is sustained through charitable contributions, and the facility in which the center is located is provided through the generosity of the James W. Hubbell, Jr. family of Des Moines, Iowa. The center also serves as the focal point for THFHS, which is associated with the center and provides financial support, structure and membership.

== Holdings ==
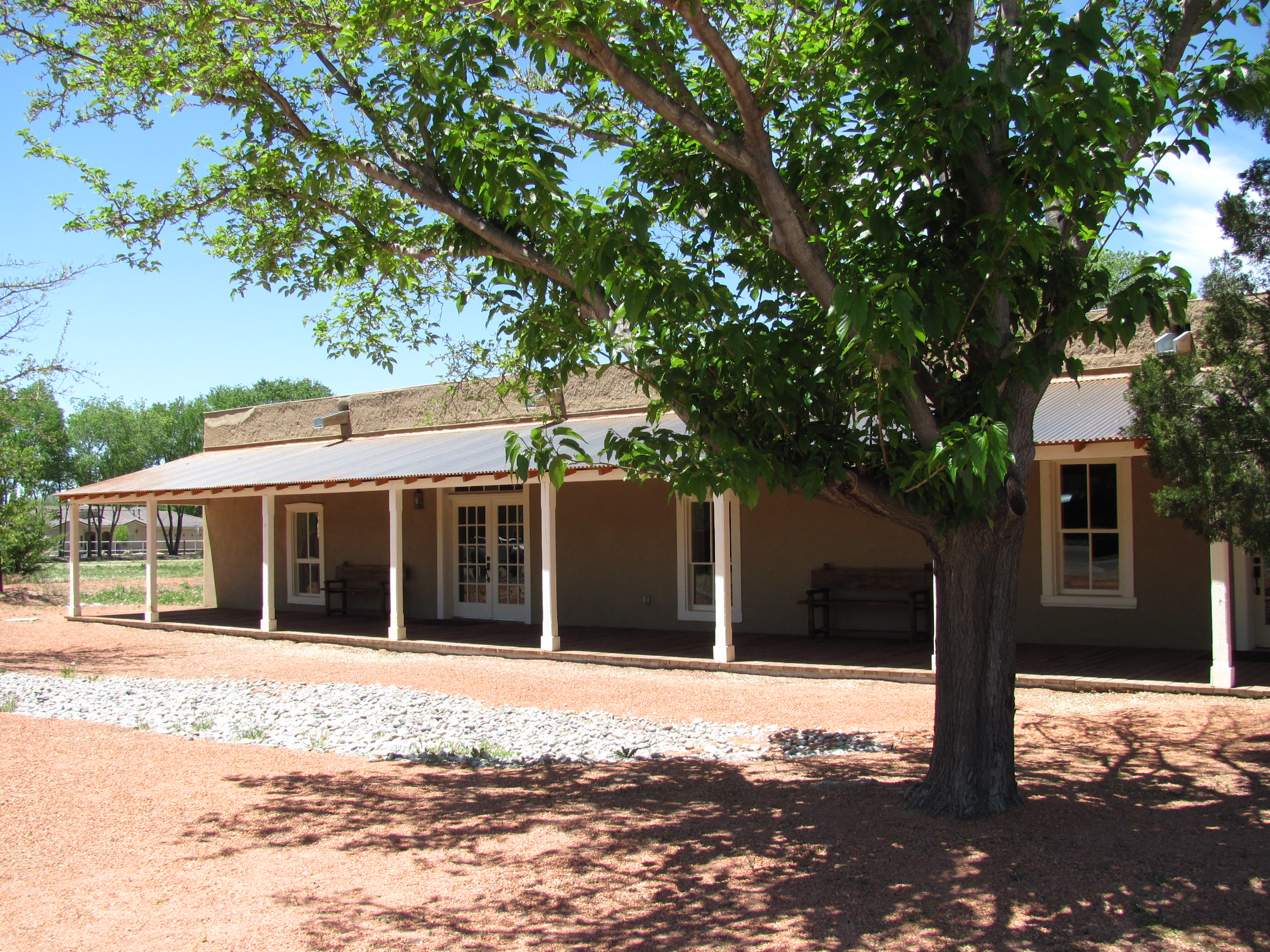
Gutierrez-Hubbell House in Pajarito, NM

The holdings of the Hubbell Center include a library of resource books on Connecticut, New York, and New England; genealogy books published by THFHS; books written by and about Hubbells of all spellings; memorabilia of the Hubbell family; and references to family-associated features such as the Hubbell Trading Post in Arizona, Hubbell House in Minnesota, the Hubbell-Gutierrez House in New Mexico, the Hubble Space Telescope, and others.
