= Henry Wilde (engineer) =

British electrical engineer

Henry Wilde (1833 – 28 March 1919) was a wealthy individual from Manchester, England, who used his self-made fortune to indulge his interest in electrical engineering.

Wilde invented the dynamo-electric machine, or self-energising dynamo, an invention for which Werner von Siemens is more usually credited and, in fact, discovered independently. At any rate, Wilde was the first to publish, his paper was communicated to the Royal Society by Michael Faraday in 1866.

The self-energising dynamo replaces the permanent magnets of previous designs with electro-magnets and in so doing achieved an enormous increase in power. The machine was considered remarkable at the time, especially since Wilde was fond of spectacular demonstrations, such as the ability of his machine to cause iron bars to melt.

== Academic patronage ==
Wilde joined the Manchester Literary and Philosophical Society in 1859 and was President 1894–1896. He made many gifts and endowments to further the cause of science including;

- The Wilde Memorial Lecture of the Manchester Literary and Philosophical Society
- Acedémie des Sciences (Paris) annual prize
- A large gift to the Institution of Electrical Engineers' Benevolent Fund
- A Readership at Oxford University
- A Scholarship at Oxford University
- Wilde Professor of Mental Philosophy
- A Lectureship at Oxford University Halley Lectures
- Donated two dynamos to the Clarendon Laboratory in 1888.

He left the remainder of his fortune to Oxford University in his will.

== Dynamo applications ==
The very first application of the dynamo by Wilde was to provide the Royal Navy with powerful searchlights. The dynamo was also much used in electro-plating.

== Litigation ==
Wilde launched a series of litigations to try to establish his priority for the dynamo, even disputing that the Siemens brothers had coined the name (Wilde credits Golding Bird with this).

It seems that Wilde was much inclined to indulge in litigation; when the Royal Society of Arts (RSA) attempted to bestow their highest award, the Albert Medal, for his contribution to the invention of the dynamo, Wilde responded with a solicitor's letter berating them for not recognising him as the sole inventor. Nevertheless, the RSA made the award in 1900.

== Wilde's process ==
Wilde's process is a method of copper-plating printing rollers which he patented in 1875. A dynamo is used to provide the electricity required for the plating process, and the same mechanical power source is used to either rotate the work being plated or drive a paddle to agitate the electrolyte. This procedure ensures an even thickness of copper which is essential in printing.

== Albert Medal ==
The citation for the Albert Medal awarded to Wilde by the Royal Society of Arts in 1900 reads;

for the discovery and practical demonstration of the indefinite increase of the magnetic and electric forces from quantities indefinitely small, a discovery now used in all dynamo machines; and for its application to the production of the electric search light and to the electro-deposition of metals from their solution.

== Notes ==
Professional and academic associations
Preceded by Arthur Schuster	President of the Manchester Literary and Philosophical Society; 1894–96	Succeeded by Henry Edward Schunck
