= Hubble (crater) =

Crater on the Moon

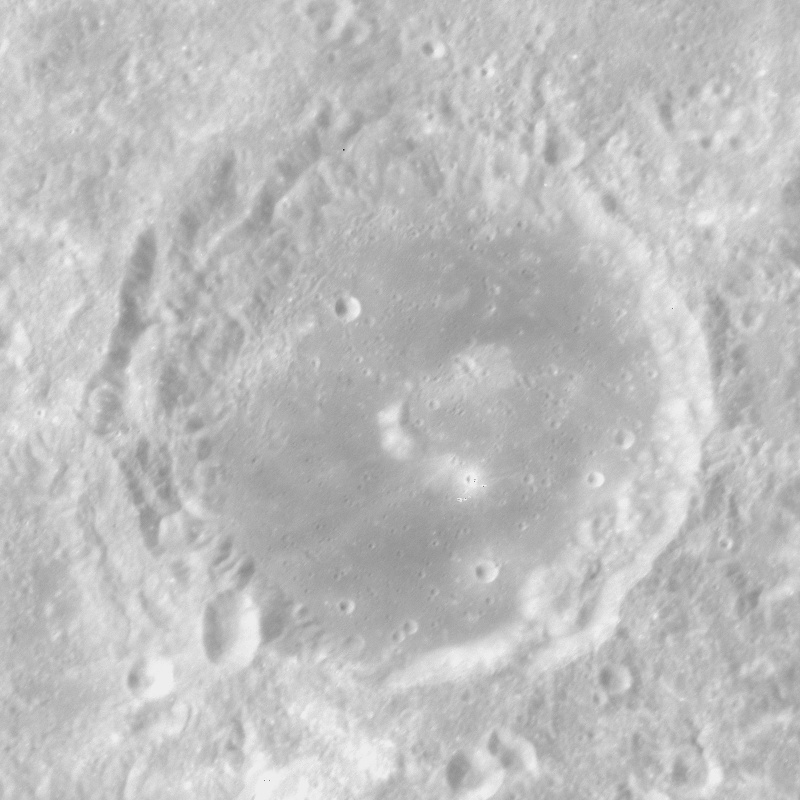
- Apollo 16 image
- Coordinates: 22.1°N 86.9°E
- Diameter: 81 km
- Depth: Unknown
- Colongitude: 275° at sunrise
- Eponym: Edwin P. Hubble

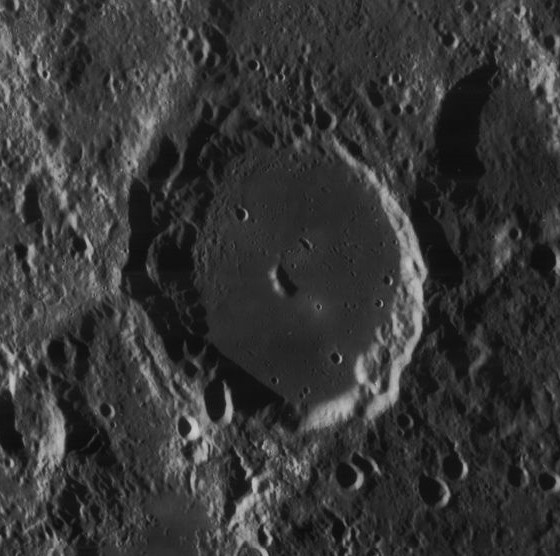
Oblique Lunar Orbiter 4 image

Hubble is a lunar impact crater that lies very near the east-northeastern limb of the Moon. At this location it is viewed almost from the side from Earth, and the visibility of this feature is affected by libration. It lies to the north of the Mare Marginis and northeast of the crater Cannon. About one crater diameter to the north-northeast is Lyapunov.

This formation dates to the Nectarian epoch of the lunar geologic timescale. The rim of this crater is worn and eroded, and it has a somewhat irregular edge in places. The inner wall is wider along the western side, where the rim has a slight outward bulge. The most intact portion of the rim lies along the eastern side, and the inner wall of this face is visible from the Earth.

The interior floor has been resurfaced by basaltic lava, giving it a lower albedo than the surrounding terrain. It is, however, not quite as dark as the lunar mare to the south. This surface is relatively level and featureless, with only a few tiny craterlets. It lacks a central peak, but a pair of small craterlets lies near the midpoint.

This crater is named after American astronomer Edwin P. Hubble (1889–1953).

== Satellite craters ==
By convention, these features are identified on lunar maps by placing the letter on the side of the crater midpoint that is closest to Hubble crater.

Hubble	Latitude	Longitude	Diameter
C	19.27° N	85.37° E	53.64 km

== See also ==
- 2069 Hubble
