= Alhazen (crater) =

Crater on the Moon

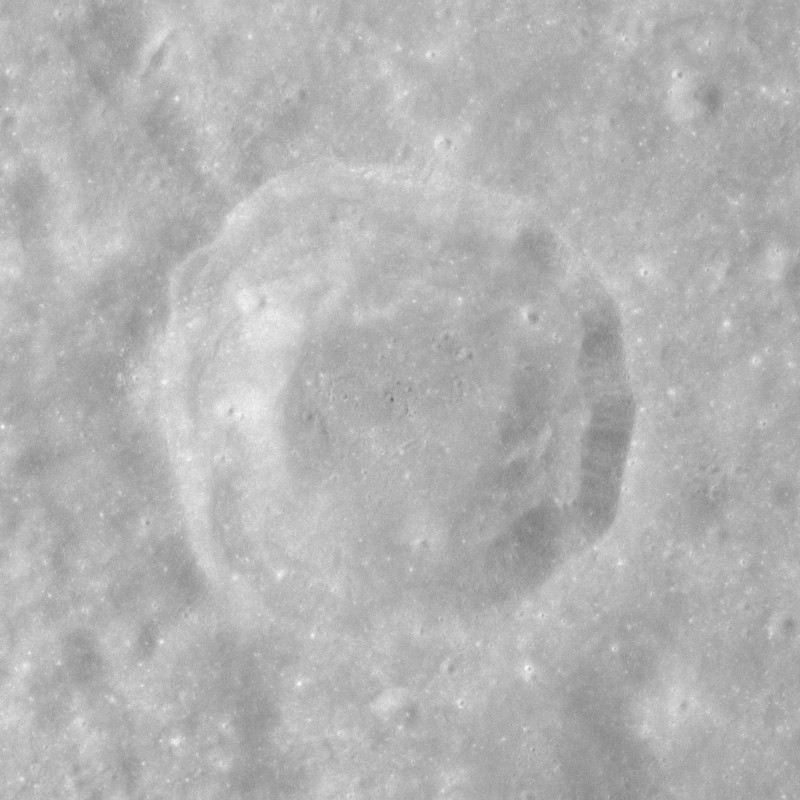
- Apollo 17 image
- Coordinates: 15.9°N 71.8°E
- Diameter: 34.65 km
- Depth: 2.0 km
- Colongitude: 289° at sunrise
- Eponym: Alhazen

Alhazen is a lunar impact crater that lies close to the eastern limb of the Moon's near side. The position of this crater means that its visibility is subject to the libration of the Moon's visible face. In the 19th century, this briefly led to the belief that the crater had been lost.

Just to the south-southeast of Alhazen is the crater Hansen, and to the west is the Mare Crisium. The rim of Alhazen is nearly circular, but appears highly oblong when viewed from the Earth due to foreshortening. The inner walls and the crater floor are rugged and irregular. A low ridge joins the south rim of Alhazen with the nearby Hansen. Alpha Alhazen and Beta Alhazen are informal names for two rises to the northwest of Alhazen crater.

This crater is named after the Arab Muslim scientist, Ibn al-Haytham. The designation was formally adopted by the International Astronomical Union in 1935. It was incorporated into lunar nomenclature by J. H. Schröter in 1791.

During very favourable libration it is possible to observe the extension of the southwestern ejectaray from farside crater Giordano Bruno, running northeast of Alhazen and south of Plutarch. This extension is also noticeable on the photographic version of chart LAC 45 (page 90) in The Clementine Atlas of the Moon (Ben Bussey / Paul D. Spudis).

== Satellite craters ==
By convention these features are identified on lunar maps by placing the letter on the side of the crater midpoint that is closest to Alhazen.

Alhazen	Latitude	Longitude	Diameter
A	16.2° N	74.3° E	14 km
D	19.7° N	75.2° E	33 km

== Gallery ==
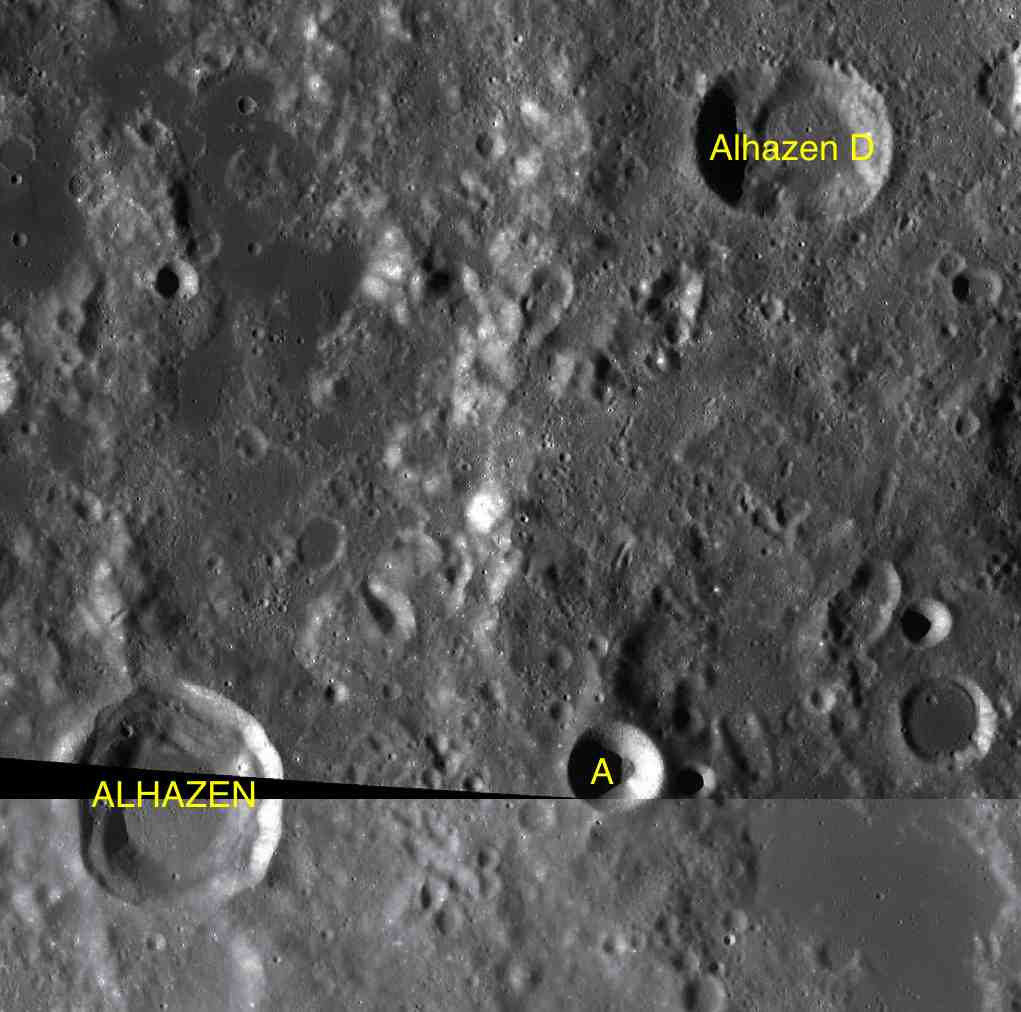
Satellite craters of Alhazen, LRO image

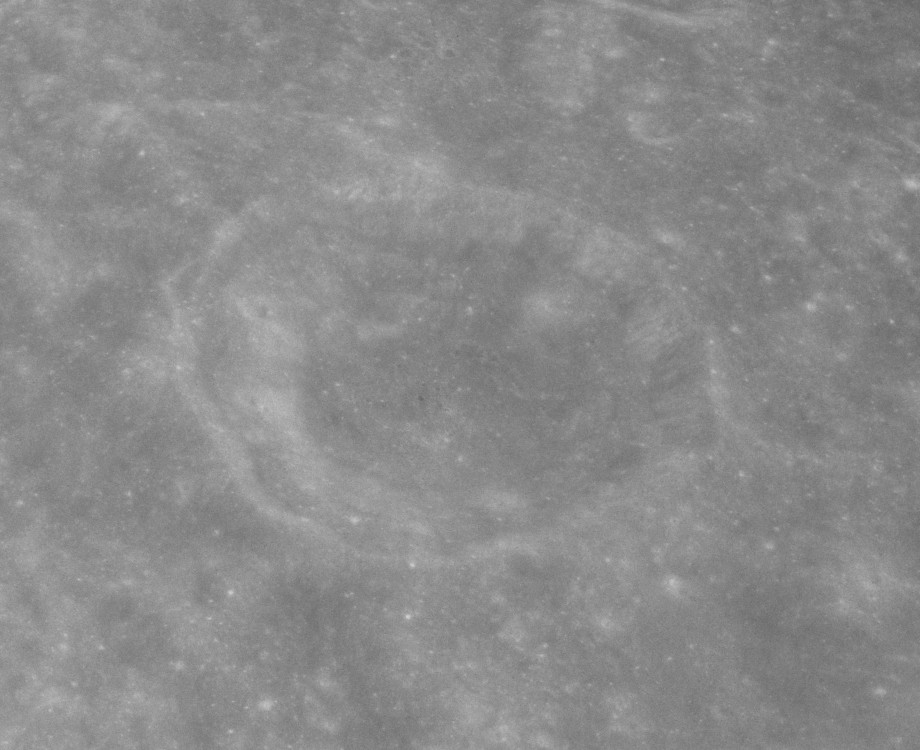
Oblique view also from Apollo 17
