= Edwin Hubble =

American astronomer (1889–1953)

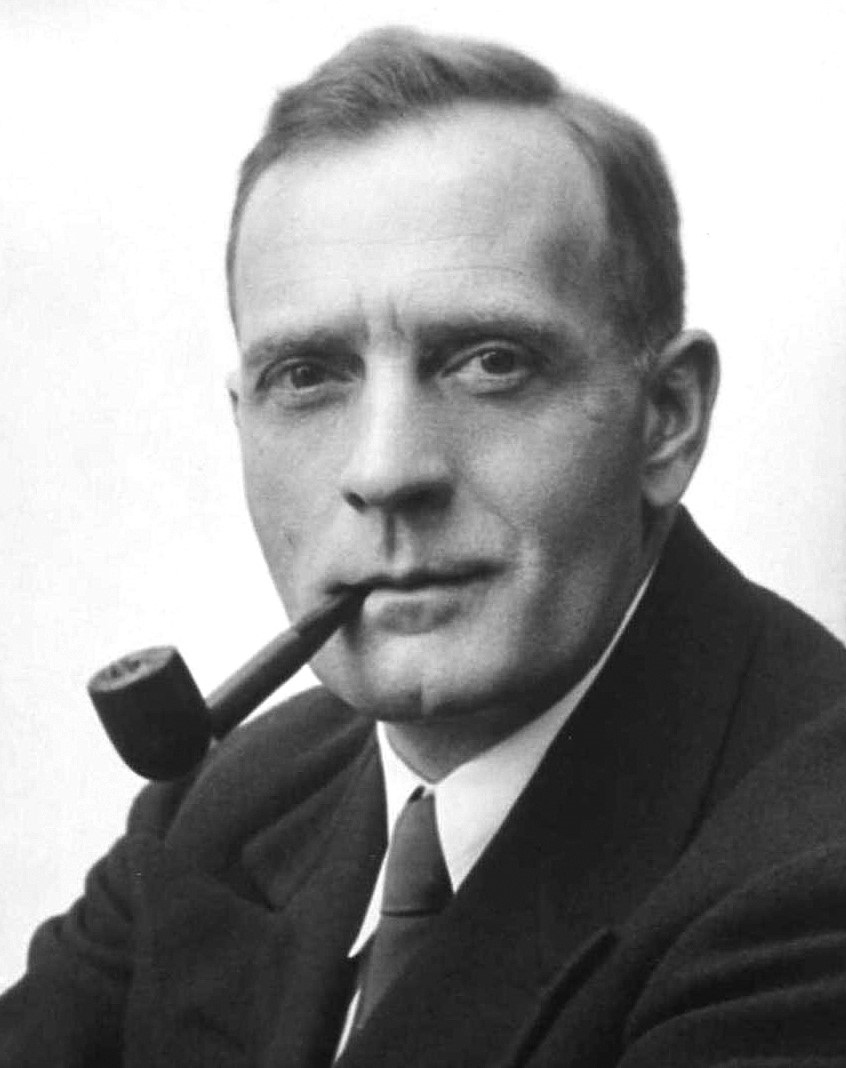
- Born: November 20, 1889; Marshfield, Missouri, U.S.
- Died: September 28, 1953 (aged 63); San Marino, California, U.S.
- Education: University of Chicago (BS, PhD); University of Oxford (MA)
- Known for: Hubble sequence; Hubble's law; Hubble luminosity law; Hubble–Reynolds law
- Spouse: Grace Burke (m. 1924)
- Awards: See list: Newcomb Cleveland Prize (1924); Barnard Medal for Meritorious Service to Science (1935); Bruce Medal (1938); Franklin Medal (1939); Gold Medal of the Royal Astronomical Society (1940); Legion of Merit (1946)
- Scientific career
- Fields: Astronomy
- Workplaces: University of Chicago; Mount Wilson Observatory; Carnegie Institution for Science; University of Cambridge
- Military career
- Branch: United States Army
- Service years: 1918
- Rank: Major
- Units: 86th Division, 2nd Battalion, 343rd Infantry Regiment
- Conflicts: World War I

Edwin Powell Hubble (November 20, 1889 – September 28, 1953) was an American astronomer. He played a crucial role in establishing the fields of extragalactic astronomy and observational cosmology. Hubble proved that many objects previously thought to be clouds of dust and gas and classified as "nebulae" were actually galaxies beyond the Milky Way. He used the strong direct relationship between a classical Cepheid variable's luminosity and pulsation period (discovered in 1908 by Henrietta Swan Leavitt) for scaling galactic and extragalactic distances.

Hubble confirmed in 1929 that the recessional velocity of a galaxy increases with its distance from Earth, a behavior that became known as Hubble's law, although it had been proposed two years earlier by Georges Lemaître. The Hubble law implies that the universe is expanding. A decade before, American astronomer Vesto Slipher had provided the first evidence that the light from many of these nebulae was strongly red-shifted, indicative of high recession velocities.

Hubble's name is most widely recognized for the Hubble Space Telescope, which was named in his honor, with a model prominently displayed in his hometown of Marshfield, Missouri.

== Early life and education ==
Hubble was born in 1889 to Virginia Lee Hubble (née James) and John Powell Hubble, an insurance executive, in Marshfield, Missouri, and moved to Wheaton, Illinois, in 1900. In his younger days, he was noted more for his athletic prowess than his intellectual abilities, although he earned good grades in every subject except spelling. Edwin was a gifted athlete, playing baseball, football, and running track in both high school and college. He won seven first places and a third place in a single high school track and field meet in 1906, and he played a variety of positions on the basketball court, from center to shooting guard. Hubble led the University of Chicago's basketball team to their first Big Ten Conference title in 1907.

=== Undergraduate studies ===
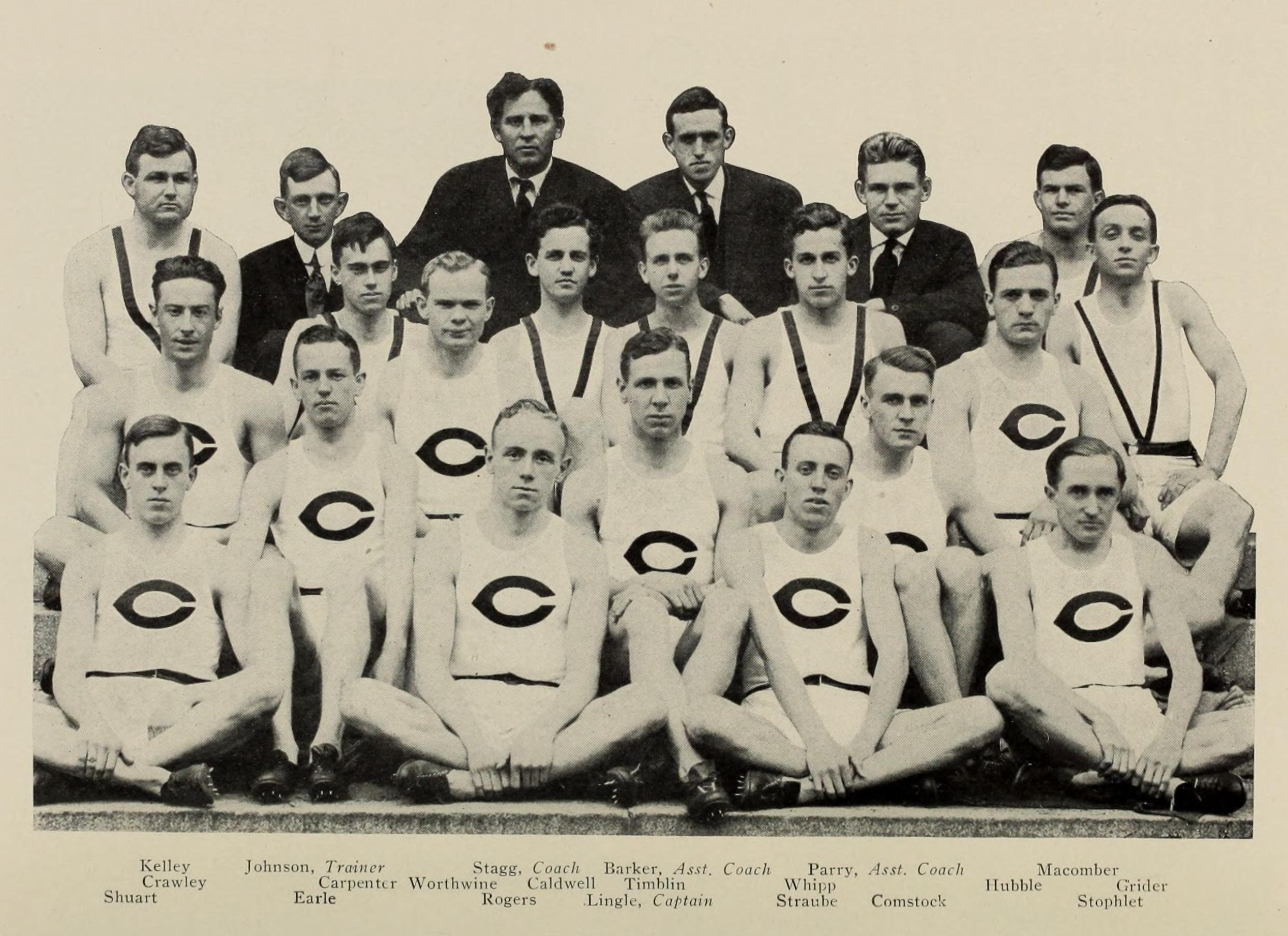
Hubble (middle row, second from right) with other members of the University of Chicago track team, 1909

Hubble's studies at the University of Chicago were concentrated on mathematics, astronomy and philosophy, which resulted in a Bachelor of Science degree by 1910. For a year he was also a student laboratory assistant for physicist Robert Millikan, a future Nobel Prize winner. Hubble also became a member of Kappa Sigma fraternity. A Rhodes Scholar, he spent three years at The Queen's College, Oxford studying jurisprudence instead of science (as a promise to his dying father), and later added studies in literature and Spanish, eventually earning a master's degree.

In 1909, Hubble's father moved his family from Chicago to Shelbyville, Kentucky, so that the family could live in a small town, ultimately settling in nearby Louisville. His father died in the winter of 1913, while Edwin was still in England. In the following summer, Edwin returned home to care for his mother, two sisters, and younger brother, along with his brother William. The family moved once more to Everett Avenue, in Louisville's Highlands neighborhood, to accommodate Edwin and William.

Hubble was a dutiful son, who despite his intense interest in astronomy since boyhood, acquiesced to his father's request to study law, first at the University of Chicago and later at Oxford University. In this time, he also took some math and science courses. After the death of his father in 1913, Edwin returned to the Midwest from Oxford but did not have the motivation to practice law. Instead, he proceeded to teach Spanish, physics and mathematics at New Albany High School in New Albany, Indiana, where he also coached the boys' basketball team. After a year of high-school teaching, he entered graduate school with the help of his former professor from the University of Chicago to study astronomy at the university's Yerkes Observatory, where he received his Ph.D. in 1921. His dissertation was titled "Photographic Investigations of Faint Nebulae". At Yerkes, he had access to its 40-inch refractor telescope built by George Ellery Hale in 1897, as well as an innovative 26-inch (61 cm) reflector telescope.

=== Doctoral studies ===
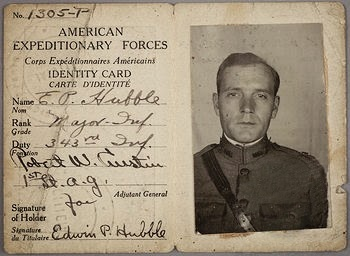
Hubble's American Expeditionary Forces identity card, 1918

After the United States declared war on Germany in 1917, Hubble rushed to complete his Ph.D. dissertation so he could join the military. Hubble volunteered for the United States Army and was assigned to the newly created 86th Division, where he served in the 2nd Battalion, 343rd Infantry Regiment. He rose to the rank of major; the 86th Division moved overseas but never saw combat as it was broken up and its personnel used as replacements in other units. After the end of World War I, Hubble spent a year at University of Cambridge, where he renewed his studies of astronomy.

== Career ==
In 1919, Hubble was offered a staff position at the Carnegie Institution for Science's Mount Wilson Observatory, near Pasadena, California, by George Ellery Hale, the founder and director of the observatory. Hubble remained on staff at Mount Wilson until his death in 1953. Shortly before his death, Hubble became the first astronomer to use the newly completed giant 200-inch (5.1 m) reflector Hale Telescope at the Palomar Observatory near San Diego, California.

Hubble also worked as a civilian for United States Army at Aberdeen Proving Ground in Maryland during World War II as the Chief of the External Ballistics Branch of the Ballistic Research Laboratory during which he directed a large volume of research in exterior ballistics which increased the effective firepower of bombs and projectiles. His work was facilitated by his personal development of several items of equipment for the instrumentation used in exterior ballistics, the most outstanding development being the high-speed clock camera, which made possible the study of the characteristics of bombs and low-velocity projectiles in flight. The results of his studies were credited with improving the design, performance, and military effectiveness of bombs and rockets. For his work there, he received the Legion of Merit award.

== Discoveries ==
=== Universe goes beyond the Milky Way galaxy ===
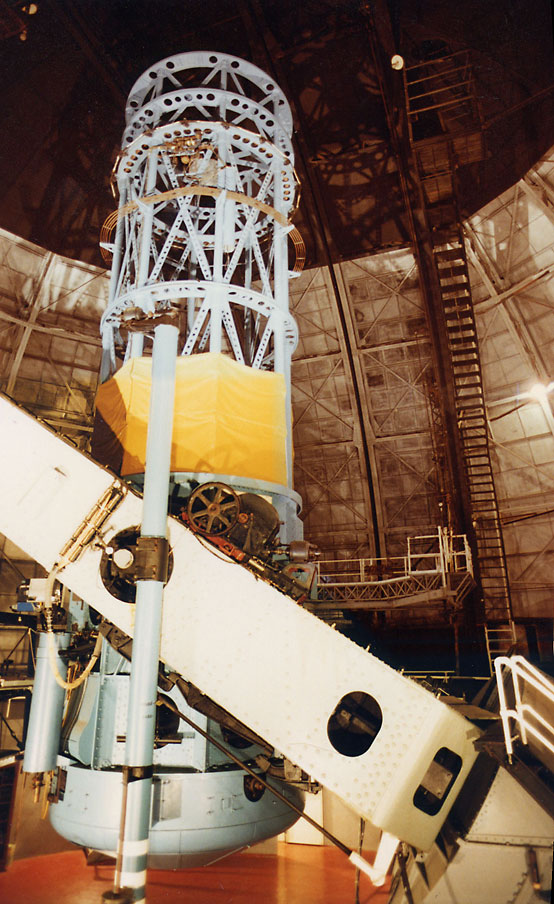
The 100-inch (2.5 m) Hooker telescope at Mount Wilson Observatory that Hubble used to measure galaxy distances and a value for the rate of expansion of the universe.

Hubble's arrival at Mount Wilson coincided roughly with the completion of the 100-inch (2.5 m) Hooker Telescope, then the world's largest. At that time, the prevailing view of the cosmos was that the universe consisted entirely of the Milky Way galaxy.

Hubble's classification scheme

Using the Hooker Telescope, Hubble identified cepheid variables, a standard candle discovered by Henrietta Swan Leavitt. Comparing their apparent luminosity to their intrinsic luminosity gives their distance from Earth. Hubble found cepheids in several nebulae, including the Andromeda Nebula and Triangulum Nebula. His observations, made in 1924, proved conclusively that these nebulae were much too distant to be part of the Milky Way and were, in fact, entire galaxies outside the Milky Way galaxy; thus, today they are no longer considered nebulae.

This was first hypothesized as early as 1755 when Immanuel Kant's General History of Nature and Theory of the Heavens appeared. Hubble's hypothesis was opposed by many in the astronomy establishment of the time, in particular by Harvard University–based Harlow Shapley. Despite the opposition, Hubble had his findings published in The New York Times on November 23, 1924, then presented them to other astronomers at the January 1, 1925, meeting of the American Astronomical Society. Hubble's results for the Andromeda galaxy were formally published in a peer-reviewed scientific journal in 1929.

Hubble's findings fundamentally changed the scientific view of the universe. Supporters state that Hubble's discovery of nebulae outside of our galaxy helped pave the way for future astronomers. Although some of his more renowned colleagues simply scoffed at his results, Hubble published his findings. This published work earned him the American Association Prize and $500 from Burton E. Livingston of the Committee on Awards.

Hubble devised the most commonly used system for classifying galaxies, grouping them according to their appearance in photographic images. He arranged the different groups of galaxies in what became known as the Hubble sequence.

=== Redshift increases with distance ===
Hubble went on to estimate the distances to 24 extra-galactic nebulae, using a variety of methods. In 1929, Hubble examined the relationship between these distances and their radial velocities as determined from their redshifts. All of his estimated distances are now known to be too small, by up to a factor of about 7. This was due to factors such as there are two kinds of cepheid variables or confusing bright gas clouds with bright stars. However, his distances were more or less proportional to the true distances, and combining his distances with measurements of the redshifts of the galaxies by Vesto Slipher and Milton L. Humason, he found a roughly linear relationship between the distances of the galaxies and their radial velocities (corrected for solar motion), a discovery that later became known as Hubble's law.

This meant that the greater the distance between any two galaxies, the greater their relative speed of separation. When interpreted that way, Hubble's measurements on 46 galaxies lead to a value for the Hubble constant of 500 km/s/Mpc, which is much higher than the currently accepted values of 74 km/s/Mpc (cosmic distance ladder method) or 68 km/s/Mpc (CMB method) due to errors in their distance calibrations.

Yet the reason for the redshift remained unclear. Lemaître predicted on theoretical grounds based on Albert Einstein's equations for general relativity the redshift-distance relation, and published observational support for it, two years before the discovery of Hubble's law. Although he uses the term "velocities" in his paper (and "apparent radial velocities" in the introduction), he later expressed doubt about interpreting these as real velocities. In 1931, he wrote a letter to the Dutch cosmologist Willem de Sitter expressing his opinion on the theoretical interpretation of the redshift-distance relation:

Mr. Humason and I are both deeply sensible of your gracious appreciation of the papers on velocities and distances of nebulae. We use the term 'apparent' velocities to emphasize the empirical features of the correlation. The interpretation, we feel, should be left to you and the very few others who are competent to discuss the matter with authority.

Today, the "apparent velocities" in question are usually thought of as an increase in proper distance that occurs due to the expansion of the universe. Light traveling through an expanding metric will experience a Hubble-type redshift, a mechanism somewhat different from the Doppler effect, although the two mechanisms become equivalent descriptions related by a coordinate transformation for nearby galaxies.

In the 1930s, Hubble was involved in determining the distribution of galaxies and spatial curvature. These data seemed to indicate that the universe was flat and homogeneous, but there was a deviation from flatness at large redshifts. According to Allan Sandage,

Hubble believed that his count data gave a more reasonable result concerning spatial curvature if the redshift correction was made assuming no recession. To the very end of his writings, he maintained this position, favouring (or at the very least keeping open) the model where no true expansion exists, and therefore that the redshift "represents a hitherto unrecognized principle of nature."

There were methodological problems with Hubble's survey technique that showed a deviation from flatness at large redshifts. In particular, the technique did not account for changes in luminosity of galaxies due to galaxy evolution. In 1917 Einstein had found that his newly developed theory of general relativity indicated that the universe must be either expanding or contracting. Unable to believe what his own equations were telling him, Einstein introduced a cosmological constant (a "fudge factor") to the equations to avoid this "problem". When Einstein learned of Hubble's redshifts, he realized that the expansion predicted by general relativity must be real, and in later life, he said that changing his equations was "the biggest blunder of [his] life". Einstein visited Mount Wilson Observatory in 1931 and met Hubble. Einstein announced there that "the visit had changed his mind".

Hubble also discovered the asteroid 1373 Cincinnati on August 30, 1935. In 1936 he wrote The Observational Approach to Cosmology and The Realm of the Nebulae which explains his approaches to extra-galactic astronomy and his view of the subject's history. In December 1941, Hubble reported to the American Association for the Advancement of Science that results from a six-year survey with the Mount Wilson telescope did not support the expanding universe theory. According to a Los Angeles Times article reporting on Hubble's remarks, "The nebulae could not be uniformly distributed, as the telescope shows they are, and still fit the explosion idea. Explanations which try to get around what the great telescope sees, he said, fail to stand up. The explosion, for example, would have had to start long after the earth was created, and possibly even after the first life appeared here." (Hubble's estimate of what we now call the Hubble constant would put the Big Bang only 2 billion years ago.)

=== Other discoveries ===
Aside from his contributions in stellar and extragalactic astronomy, Hubble also discovered a comet of his own, C/1937 P1 (Hubble), on 4 August 1937. This comet remained observable for 58 days until 28 October 1937.

== Personal life ==
Hubble married Grace Lillian (Burke) Leib (1889–1980), daughter of John Patrick and Luella (Kepford) Burke, on February 26, 1924. Hubble was raised as a Protestant Christian, but some of his later statements suggest uncertainty.

Hubble had a heart attack in July 1949 while on vacation in Colorado. He was cared for by his wife and continued on a modified diet and work schedule. He died of cerebral thrombosis (a blood clot in his brain) on September 28, 1953, in San Marino, California. No funeral was held for him, and his wife never revealed his burial site.

Hubble's papers comprising the bulk of his correspondence, photographs, notebooks, observing logbooks, and other materials, are held by the Huntington Library in San Marino, California. They were donated by his wife Grace Burke Hubble upon her death in 1980.

== Controversies ==
=== Accusations concerning Lemaître's priority ===
In 2011, the journal Nature reported claims that Hubble might have played a role in the redaction of key parts of the 1931 English translation of Lemaître's 1927 paper, which formulated what was later called Hubble's law and also gave observational evidence. Historians quoted in the article were skeptical that the redactions were part of a campaign to ensure Hubble retained priority. However, astronomer Sidney van den Bergh published a paper suggesting that while the omissions may have been made by a translator, they may still have been deliberate.

In November 2011, astronomer Mario Livio reported in Nature that a letter he found in the Lemaître archive demonstrated that the redaction had been made by Lemaître, who apparently saw no point in publishing scientific content which had already been reported in 1929 by Hubble. Lemaître's paper was published in French, two years prior to Hubble.

=== Campaign to obtain a Nobel Prize ===
During Hubble's life the Nobel Prize in Physics did not cover astronomy. Hubble spent much of the later part of his career attempting to have astronomy considered part of physics, instead of being a separate science. He did this largely so that astronomers—including himself—could be recognized by the Nobel Committee for their contributions to astrophysics. This campaign was unsuccessful in Hubble's lifetime, but shortly after his death, the Nobel Prize Committee decided that astronomical work would be eligible for the physics prize.

== Honors ==
=== Awards ===
- Newcomb Cleveland Prize in 1924;
- Bruce Medal in 1938;
- Franklin Medal in 1939;
- Gold Medal of the Royal Astronomical Society in 1940;
- Legion of Merit for outstanding contribution to ballistics research in 1946.

=== Honors ===
- Elected member of the United States National Academy of Sciences in 1927;
- Elected member of the American Philosophical Society in 1929.

=== Namesakes ===
- Asteroid 2069 Hubble;
- The crater Hubble on the Moon;
- Orbiting Hubble Space Telescope;
- Edwin P. Hubble Planetarium, located in the Edward R. Murrow High School, Brooklyn, New York;
- Edwin Hubble Highway, the stretch of Interstate 44 passing through his birthplace of Marshfield, Missouri;
- Hubble Middle School, a public school in Wheaton, Illinois, where he lived from 11 years old and up.

=== Postage stamp ===
On March 6, 2008, the United States Postal Service released a 41-cent stamp honoring Hubble on a sheet titled "American Scientists" designed by artist Victor Stabin. His citation reads:

Often called a "pioneer of the distant stars", astronomer Edwin Hubble (1889–1953) played a pivotal role in deciphering the vast and complex nature of the universe. His meticulous studies of spiral nebulae proved the existence of galaxies other than our own Milky Way. Had he not died suddenly in 1953, Hubble would have won that year's Nobel Prize in Physics.

The assertion that he would have won the Nobel Prize in 1953 is likely false, although he was nominated for the prize that year. The other scientists on the "American Scientists" sheet include Gerty Cori, biochemist; Linus Pauling, chemist, and John Bardeen, physicist.

=== Other notable appearances ===
- 1934 delivered the Halley Lecture at University of Oxford;
- 2003 Hall of Famous Missourians;
- 2017 Indiana Basketball Hall of Fame.
- The play Creation's Birthday, written by Cornell physicist Hasan Padamsee, tells Hubble's life story.

== See also ==
- Astronomy
  - Distance measures
  - Cosmic distance ladder
  - K correction
- Galaxies
  - Hubble sequence
  - Galaxy morphological classification
  - Gérard de Vaucouleurs
  - Spiral galaxy
  - Whirlpool Galaxy
  - William Wilson Morgan
- Expansion of the universe
  - Big Bang
  - General relativity
  - Hubble's law
  - Albert Einstein
- Hubble Space Telescope
- Edwin Hubble House, residence and National Historic Landmark in San Marino, California
- The Great Debate of April 26, 1920
