= Vera C. Rubin Observatory =

Astronomical observatory in Chile

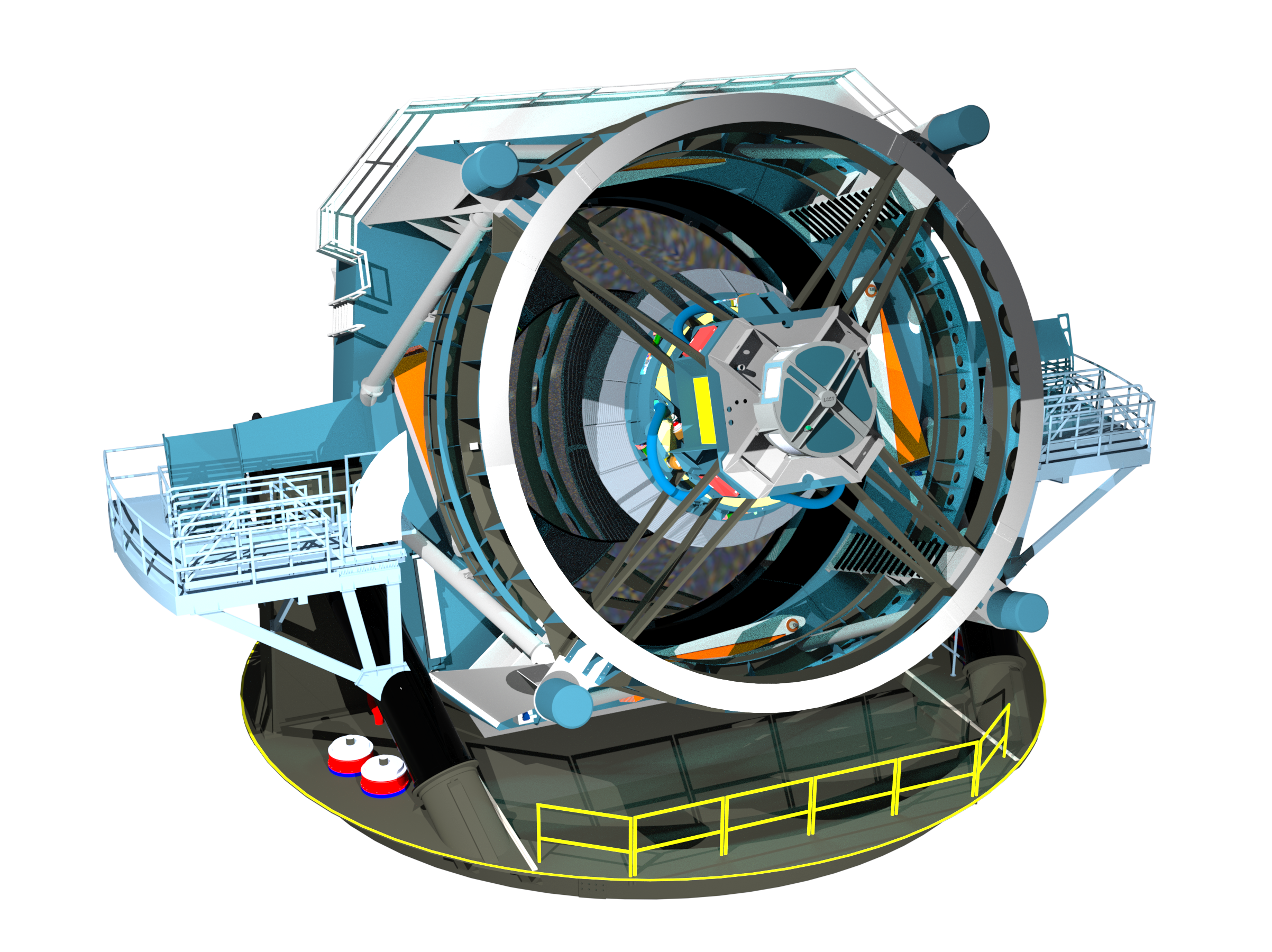
- Rendering of completed Simonyi Survey Telescope

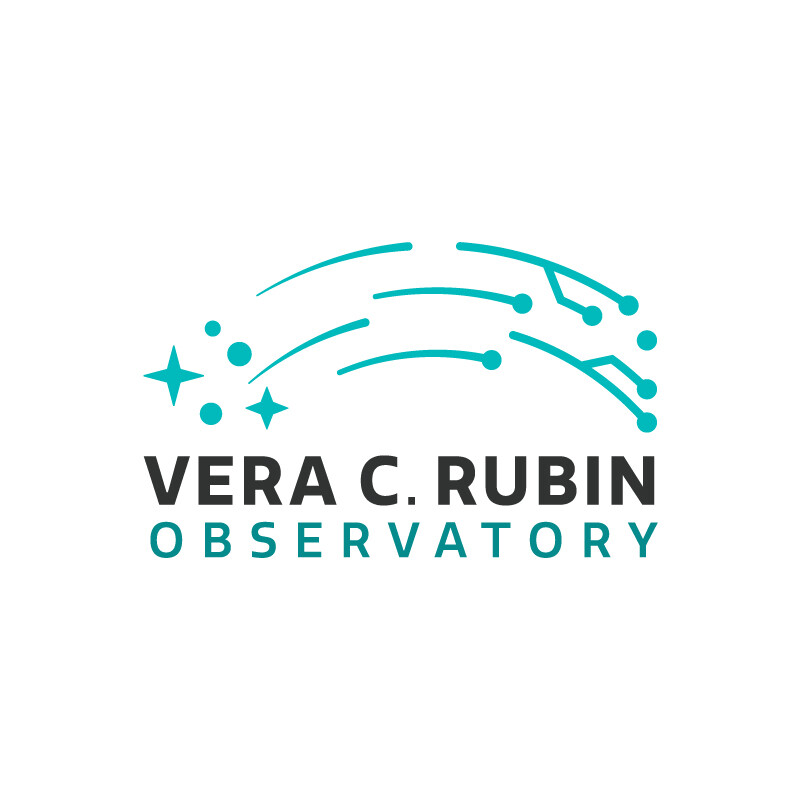
- Alternative names: Rubin
- Named after: Vera Rubin
- Location: Elqui Province, Coquimbo Region, Chile
- Coordinates: 30°14′41″S 70°44′58″W
- Observatory code: X05
- Altitude: 2,672.75 m (8,768.9 ft)
- Wavelength: 320 nm (940 THz)–1,060 nm (280 THz)
- First light: June 2025
- Diameter: 8.417 m (27 ft 7.4 in)
- Secondary diameter: 3.420 m (11 ft 2.6 in)
- Tertiary diameter: 5.016 m (16 ft 5.5 in)
- Angular resolution: 0.7″ median seeing limit 0.2″ pixel size
- Collecting area: 35 m^{2} (380 sq ft)
- Focal length: 10.31, 9.9175 m (33 ft 9.91 in, 32 ft 6.45 in)
- Website: rubinobservatory.org
- Location within Chile
- Related media on Commons

The Vera C. Rubin Observatory, formerly the Large Synoptic Survey Telescope (LSST), is an astronomical observatory in Coquimbo Region, Chile. Its main task is to conduct an astronomical survey of the southern sky every few nights, creating a ten-year time-lapse record, termed the Legacy Survey of Space and Time (also abbreviated LSST). The observatory is located on the El Peñón peak of Cerro Pachón, a 2,682-meter-high (8,799 ft) mountain in northern Chile, alongside the existing Gemini South and Southern Astrophysical Research Telescopes. The base facility is located about 100 kilometres (62 miles) away from the observatory by road, in La Serena.

The observatory is named for Vera Rubin, an American astronomer who pioneered discoveries about galactic rotation rates. It is a joint initiative of the U.S. National Science Foundation (NSF) and the U.S. Department of Energy's (DOE) Office of Science and is operated jointly by NSF NOIRLab and SLAC National Accelerator Laboratory.

The Rubin Observatory houses the Simonyi Survey Telescope, a wide-field reflecting telescope with an 8.4-meter primary mirror. It uses a variant of three-mirror anastigmat to deliver sharp images over a 3.5-degree-diameter field of view. Images are recorded by a 3.2-gigapixel charge-coupled device imaging (CCD) camera, the largest camera yet constructed.

Rubin saw first light in June 2025 and started full survey operations in July 2026, taking an image of the night sky every 40 seconds in order to complete a full scan of the southern sky every few days for the next ten years. The observatory is expected to catalog millions of supernovae, more than five million asteroids (including ~100,000 near-Earth objects), and image approximately 17 billion stars and 20 billion galaxies.

== Name ==
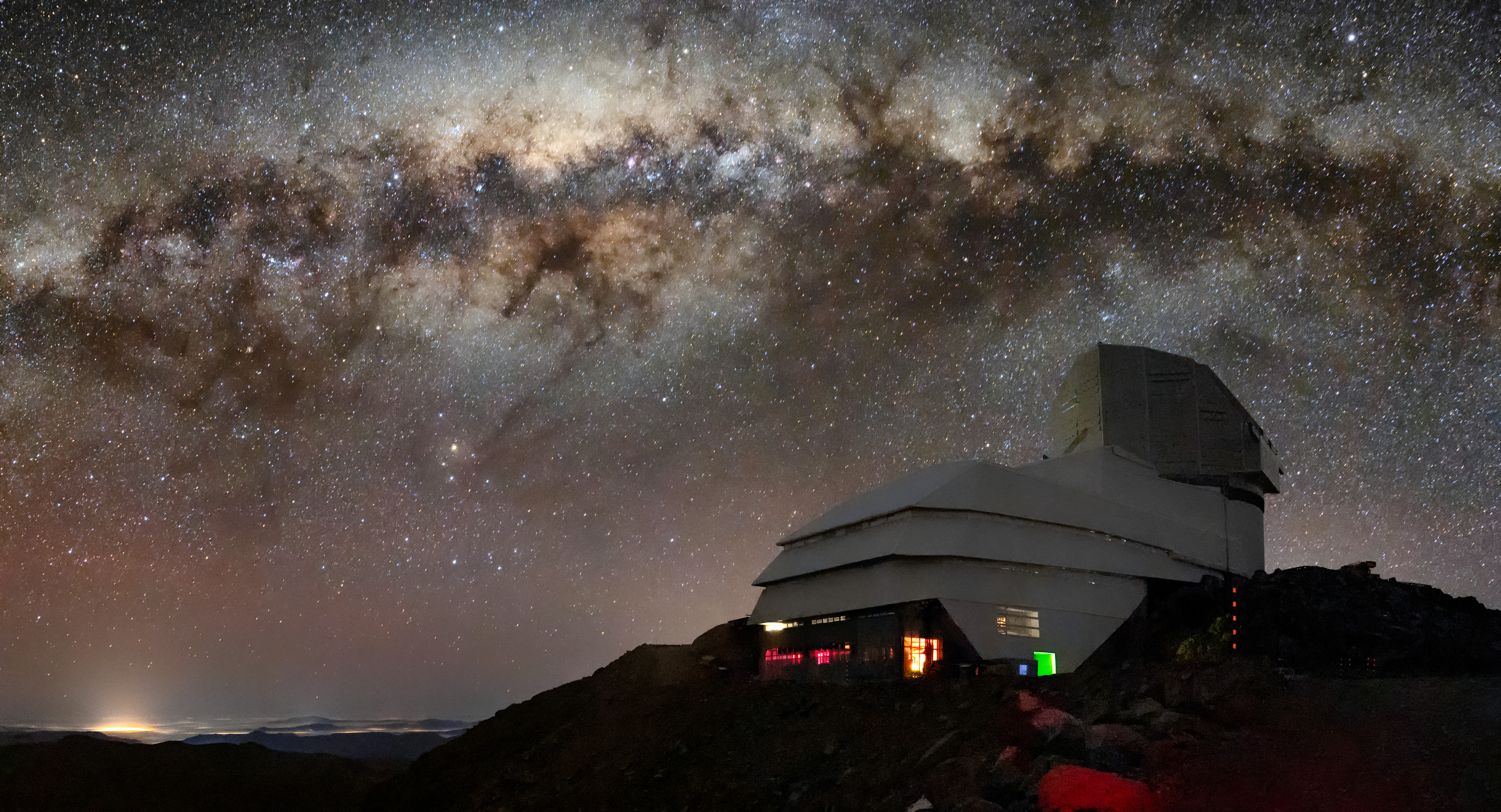
Vera C. Rubin Observatory and the Milky Way Galaxy

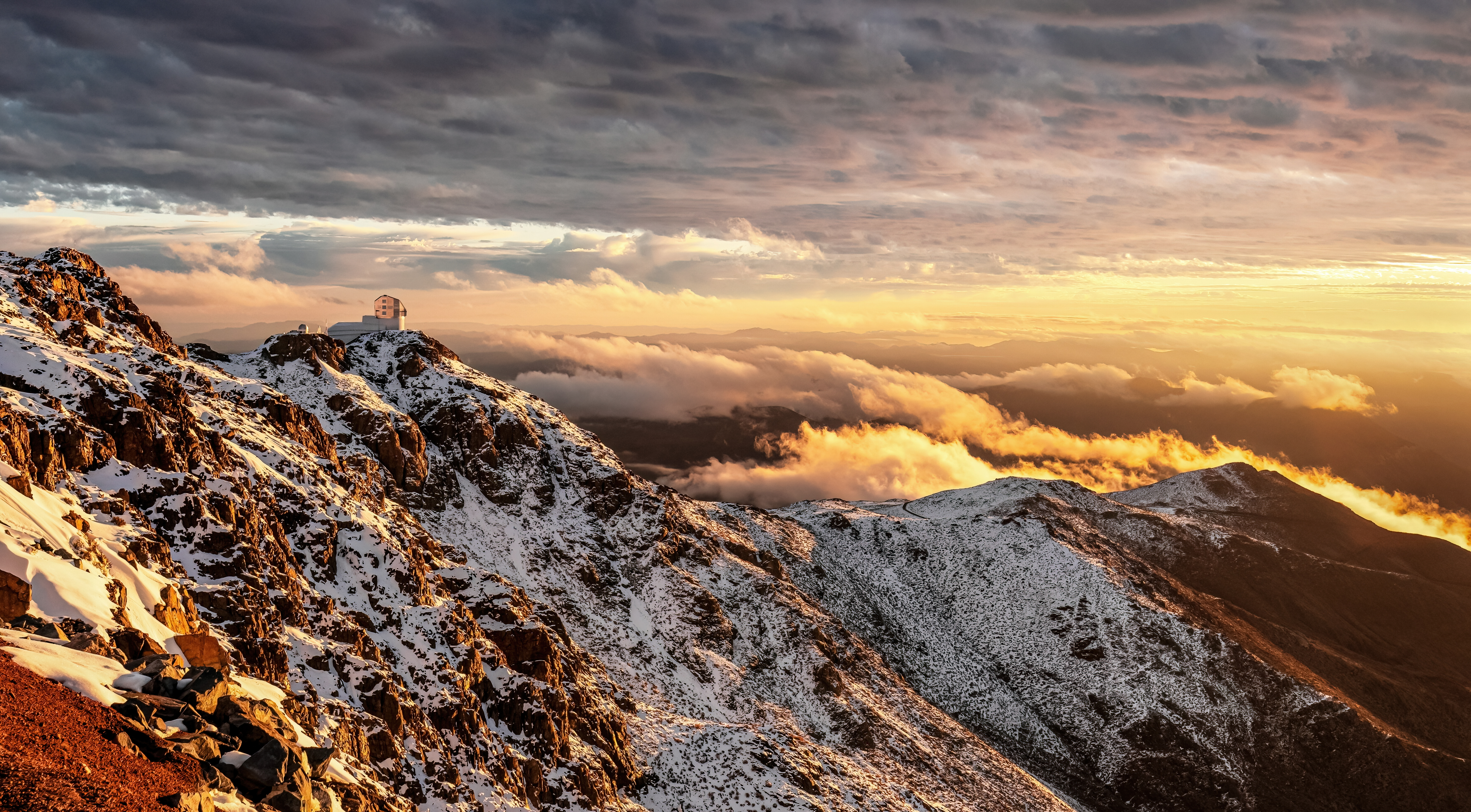
Vera C. Rubin Observatory on Cerro Pachón mountain in Central Chile

The telescope was originally named the Large Synoptic Survey Telescope, where the word synoptic—derived from the Greek words σύν (syn 'together') and ὄψις (opsis 'view')—describes observations that give a broad view of a subject. In June 2019, the observatory was renamed the Vera C. Rubin Observatory as proposed by United States Representative Eddie Bernice Johnson and Resident Commissioner of Puerto Rico Jenniffer González-Colón. The renaming was enacted as United States law on 20 December 2019, and announced at the 2020 American Astronomical Society winter meeting. The name honors Rubin and her colleagues' probes of the nature of dark matter by mapping and cataloging billions of galaxies through space and time.

The telescope itself is named the Simonyi Survey Telescope, in recognition of private donors Charles and Lisa Simonyi.

The LSST acronym was repurposed to refer to the survey that the observatory will perform as the "Legacy Survey of Space and Time", with the camera as the "LSST Camera".

== History ==
The Rubin Observatory was proposed in 2001 as the LSST. Construction of the mirror began in 2007 with private funds. The LSST then became the top-ranked large ground-based project in the 2010 Astrophysics Decadal Survey, and officially began construction on 1 August 2014. Funding came from the NSF, DOE, and private funding raised by the private LSST Discovery Alliance. Operations are managed by the Association of Universities for Research in Astronomy (AURA). Construction cost was expected to be about $680 million.

Site construction began in April 2015. The first pixel with the engineering camera came in October 2024, while system first light images were released 23 June 2025. Full survey operations began on 30 June 2026, having been delayed by COVID-related issues.

The Rubin Observatory is the successor to a tradition of sky surveys. These started as visually compiled catalogs in the 18th century, such as the Messier catalog. This was replaced by photographic surveys, starting with the 1885 Harvard Plate Collection, the National Geographic Society – Palomar Observatory Sky Survey, and others. By about 2000, the first digital surveys, such as the Sloan Digital Sky Survey (SDSS), began to replace the earlier photographic plate surveys.

The Rubin Observatory evolved from the Dark Matter Telescope, mentioned as early as 1996. The fifth decadal report, Astronomy and Astrophysics in the New Millennium, was released in 2001, and recommended the "Large-Aperture Synoptic Survey Telescope" as a major initiative. Even at this early stage the basic design and objectives were set:

The Large-aperture Synoptic Survey Telescope (LSST) is a 6.5-m-class optical telescope designed to survey the visible sky every week down to a much fainter level than that reached by existing surveys. It will catalog 90 percent of the near-Earth objects larger than 300 m and assess the threat they pose to life on Earth. It will find some 10,000 primitive objects in the Kuiper Belt, which contains a fossil record of the formation of the solar system. It will also contribute to the study of the structure of the universe by observing thousands of supernovae, both nearby and at large redshift, and by measuring the distribution of dark matter through gravitational lensing. All the data will be available through the National Virtual Observatory, providing access for astronomers and the public to very deep images of the changing night sky.

Early development was funded by small grants, with major contributions in January 2008 by software billionaires Charles and Lisa Simonyi and Bill Gates, of $20 million and $10 million, respectively. $7.5 million was included in the U.S. President's FY2013 NSF budget request. DOE funded the digital camera component built by the SLAC National Accelerator Laboratory, as part of its mission to understand dark energy.

NSF funding for the rest of construction was authorized on 1 August 2014. The lead organizations are:

- The SLAC National Accelerator Laboratory to design and construct the LSST camera
- The National Optical Astronomy Observatory to provide the telescope and site team
- The National Center for Supercomputing Applications to construct and test the archive and data access center
- The Association of Universities for Research in Astronomy to oversee construction

In May 2018, the United States appropriated more funding for the telescope than had been requested, to speed construction and operation. Telescope management was unsure this would help, since at that stage of construction they were not cash-limited.

First released image: the Trifid and Lagoon nebulae

Virgo Cluster taken by Vera C. Rubin Observatory

The first photons resolved by the complete instrument were detected on 15 April 2025, appearing as rings before the instrument was adjusted to focus them as dots. Images from the first light of the full telescope and camera combination were released on 23 June 2025. The first teasers were a composite image of the Trifid and Lagoon nebulae and extracts from a wide-field view of galaxies in the Virgo Cluster. The image of the Virgo Cluster was taken in early May over four nights. The early images showed over 2,000 new asteroids. Watch parties for the release were held across six continents as people from 28 countries had been involved. Early discoveries include the unusually large and quickly rotating asteroid 2025 MN45 in the main belt and the large trans-Neptunian object and dwarf planet candidate 2026 ED138.

== Simonyi Survey Telescope ==
The Simonyi Survey Telescope design is unique among large telescopes (8-meter-class primary mirrors) for its wide field of view: 3.5° in diameter, or 9.6 deg^{2}. For comparison, both the Sun and the Moon, as seen from Earth, are about 0.5° in apparent diameter and each covers an apparent area of about 0.2 deg^{2}. Combined with its large aperture (and thus light-collecting ability), this gives Rubin a large etendue of 319 m^{2}⋅deg^{2}. This is more than three times the etendue of other large-entendue telescopes, the Subaru Telescope with its Hyper Suprime Camera and Pan-STARRS, and more than an order of magnitude larger than most large telescopes.

=== Optics ===
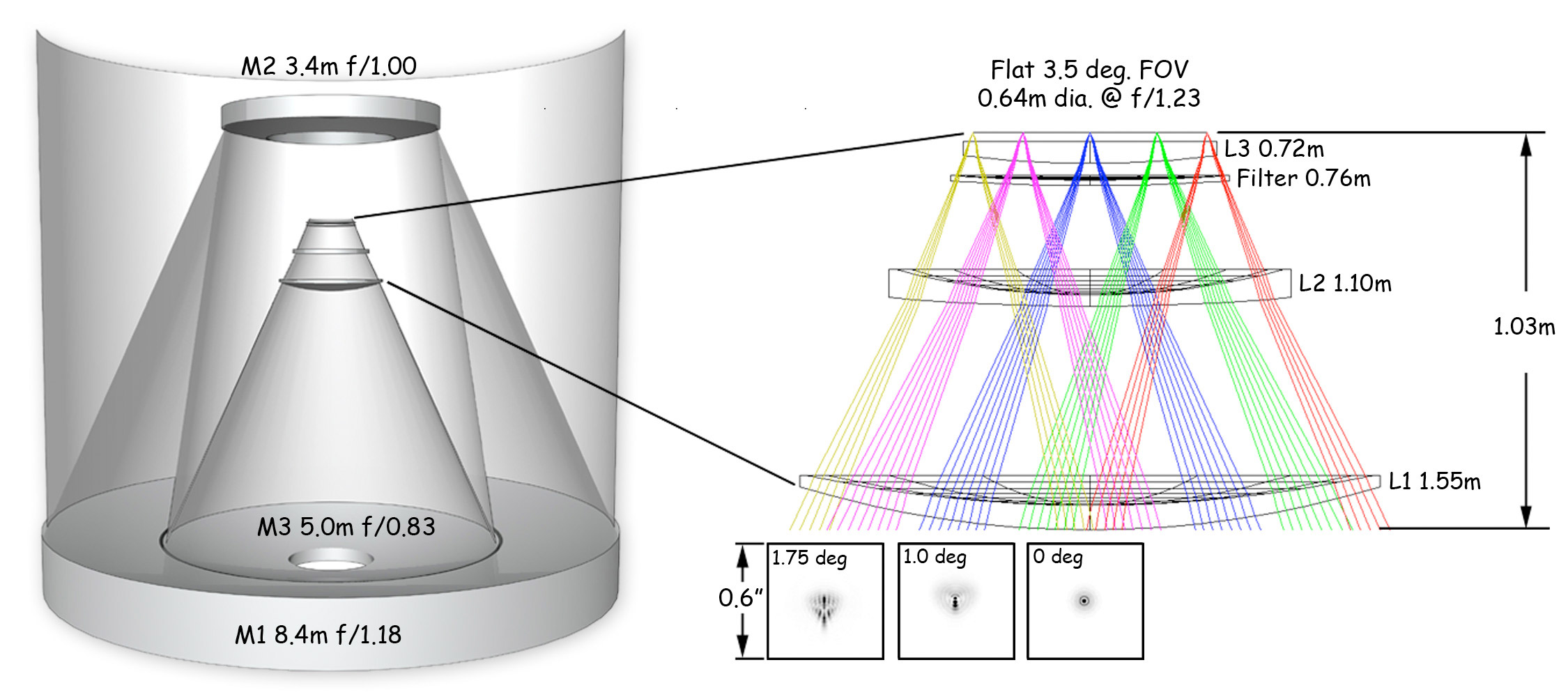
Optics

The earliest reflecting telescopes used spherical mirrors that were easy to fabricate and test. However, because they suffer from spherical aberration; a long focal length was needed to achieve a tolerable level of spherical aberration. Making the primary mirror parabolic removes spherical aberration on-axis, but the field of view is then limited by off-axis coma. Such a parabolic primary, with either a prime or Cassegrain focus, was the most common optical design up through the Hale Telescope in 1949. After that, telescopes mostly used the Ritchey–Chrétien design, using two hyperbolic mirrors to remove both spherical aberration and coma, increasing the useful field of view, limited by astigmatism and higher-order aberrations. Most later large telescopes used this design—for example, the Hubble and Keck telescopes. LSST instead uses a three-mirror anastigmat to cancel astigmatism by employing three non-spherical mirrors. The result is sharp images over a wide field of view, at the expense of some light-gathering power due to the large tertiary mirror obscuring part of the optical path.

The telescope's primary mirror (M1) is 8.4 meters (28 ft) in diameter, the secondary mirror (M2) is 3.4 meters (11.2 ft) in diameter, and the tertiary mirror (M3), inside the ring-like primary, is 5.0 meters (16 ft) in diameter. The secondary mirror is the largest convex mirror in any operating telescope. (It will be surpassed by the Extremely Large Telescope's 4.2-meter secondary when complete). The second and third mirrors reduce the primary mirror's light-collecting area to 35 m^{2} (376.7 sq ft), with an effective aperture equivalent to a 6.42 m (253 in) diameter single mirror. Multiplying the collecting area by the field of view produces an étendue of 336 m^{2}⋅deg^{2}; the actual figure is reduced by vignetting.

The primary and tertiary mirrors (M1 and M3) are formed from a single piece of glass, the M1M3 monolith. Placing the two mirrors in the same location minimizes the overall length of the telescope, making it easier to quickly reorient. Making them from the same piece of glass results in a stiffer structure than two separate mirrors, contributing to rapid settling after motion.

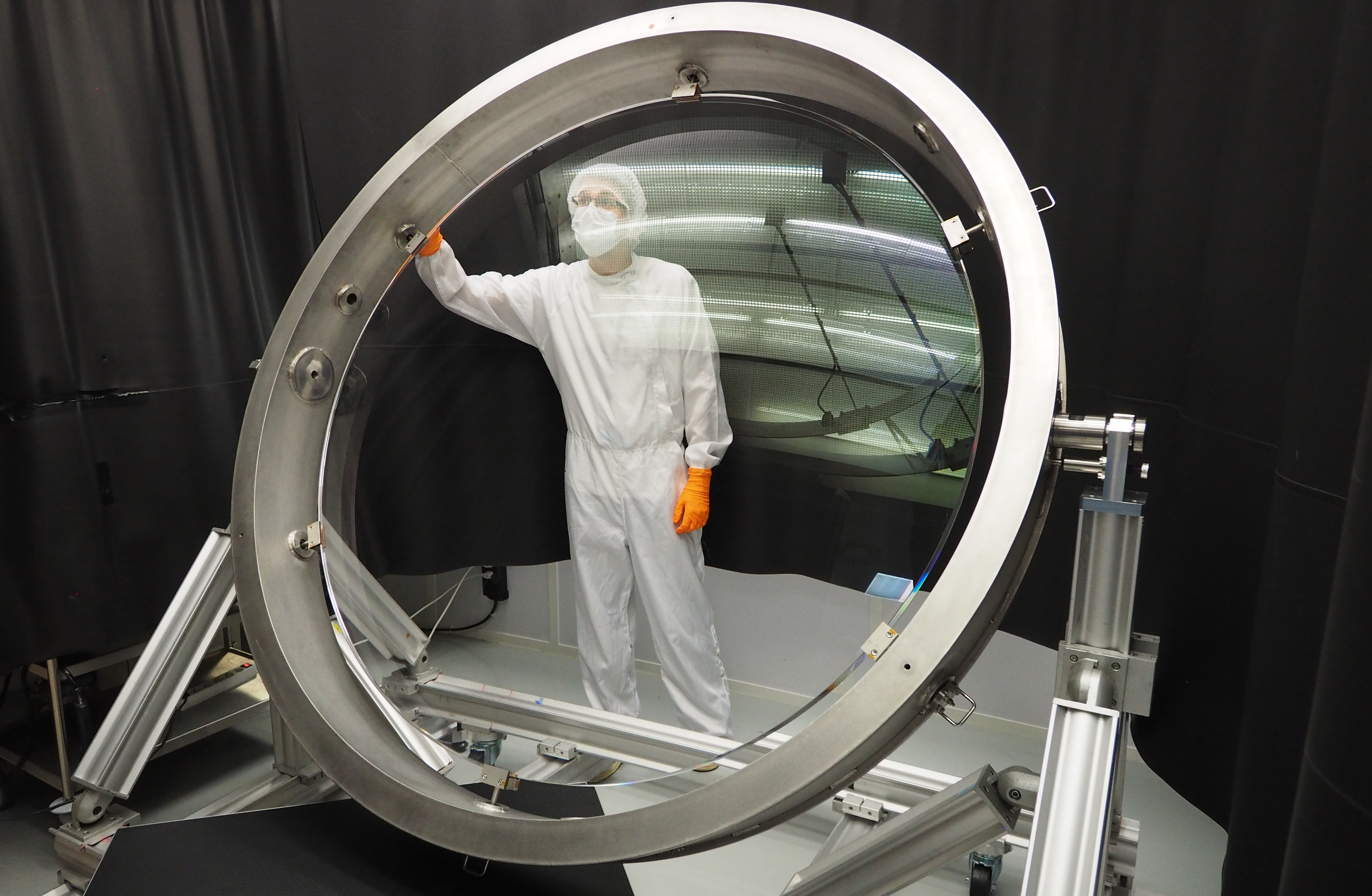
L1 lens, 2018

The optics includes three corrector lenses to reduce aberrations. These lenses, and the telescope's filters, are built into the camera assembly. The first lens, at 1.55 m in diameter, is the largest non-compound lens ever built, and the third lens forms the vacuum window in front of the focal plane.

Unlike many telescopes, Rubin does not attempt to compensate for atmospheric dispersion. Such correction, which requires adjusting an additional element in the optical train, would be difficult to achieve in the 5 seconds available between pointings. It is also a technical challenge due to the short focal length. As a result, shorter wavelength bands away from the zenith have reduced image quality.

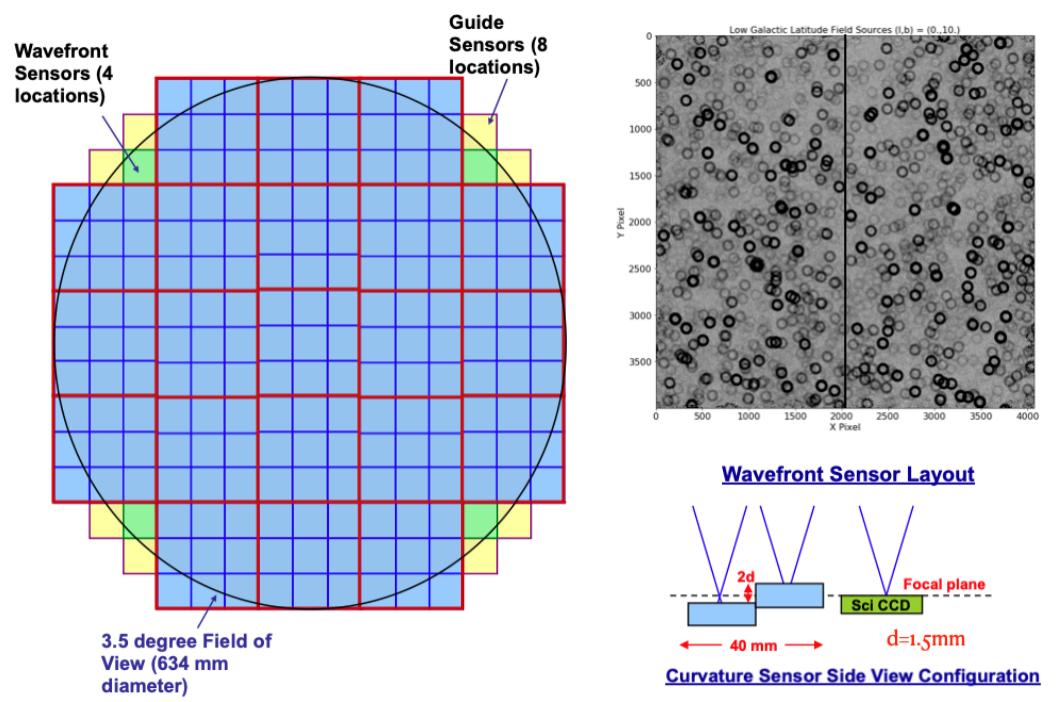
Diagram of the Active Optics sensors

==== Wavefront sensing ====
The telescope uses an active optics system, with wavefront sensors at the corners of the camera, to keep the mirrors accurately figured and in focus. The field of view is too large to use adaptive optics to correct for atmospheric seeing. Sensing occurs in three stages:

- Laser trackers make sure the components are centered and are close to the intended positions.
- Open-loop corrections are applied to correct for intrinsic mirror aberrations, component sag as a function of elevation and temperature, and filter selection.
- Focus and figure measurements are made by sensors at the corners of the field of view to correct the optics.

The precise shape and focus of the mirror assembly is estimated, and then corrected, by comparing the images on four sets of deliberately defocused CCDs (one in front of the focal plane and one behind, see figure). One correction method proceeds analytically, estimating a Zernike polynomial description of the current shape of the mirror, and from this computing a set of corrections to restore figure and focus. Another method, considerably faster, uses machine learning for this task.

Camera sensor

=== Camera ===
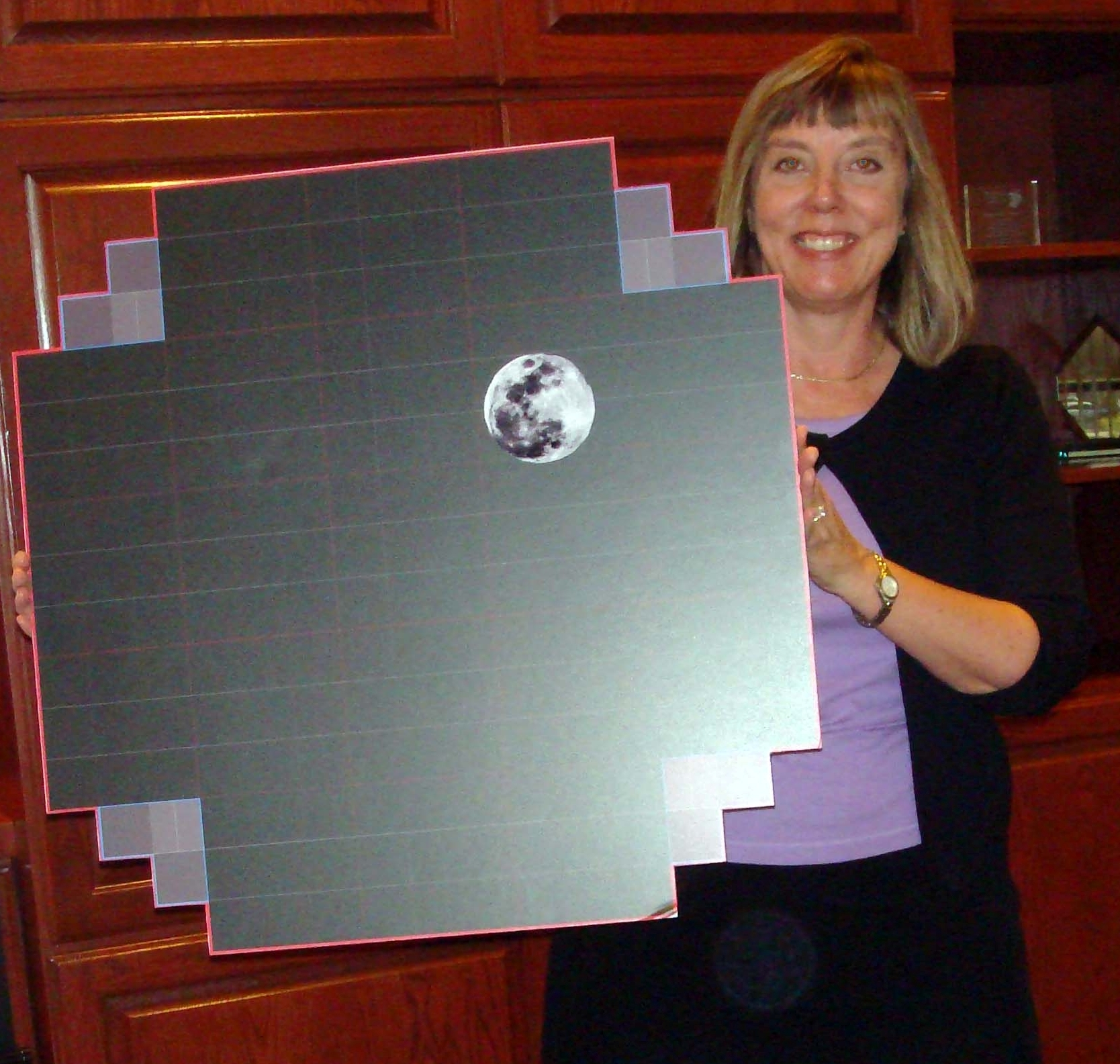
Life-size model of the focal plane array – the array's diameter is 64 cm, and will provide 3.2 gigapixels per image. The image of the Moon (30 arcminutes) is present to show the scale of the field of view. The model is held by Suzanne Jacoby, the Rubin Observatory communications director.

The 3.2-gigapixel digital camera takes 30-second exposures. The camera is at the tertiary focus, not the prime focus. Located at a "trapped focus" in front of the primary mirror, the associated technical problems are similar to those of a conventional prime-focus survey camera. Repointing such a large telescope (including settling time) within 5 seconds requires a short and stiff structure. This in turn implies a small f-number, which requires precise focusing.

Using two 15-second exposures is a compromise to allow spotting both faint and moving sources. The single 30-second exposure recommendation reduces the overhead of camera readout and telescope re-positioning, allowing deeper imaging. Cosmic ray hits on the CCDs ultimately became detected reliably in a single 30-second image.

The camera focal plane is flat and 64 cm in diameter. The main imaging is performed by a mosaic of 189 16-megapixel CCD detectors. They are grouped into a 5×5 grid of "rafts". The central 21 rafts contain 3×3 imaging sensors, while the four corner rafts contain three each, for guiding and focus control. The CCDs provide better than 0.2-arcsecond sampling, and are cooled to approximately −100 °C (173 K) to reduce noise.

The camera includes a filter located between the second and third lenses, and an automatic filter-changing mechanism. Although the camera has six filters (ugrizy) covering 330–1080 nm wavelengths, the camera's position between the secondary and tertiary mirrors limits the size of its filter changer. It can hold five filters at a time, so one of the six is omitted each night.

=== Image data processing ===
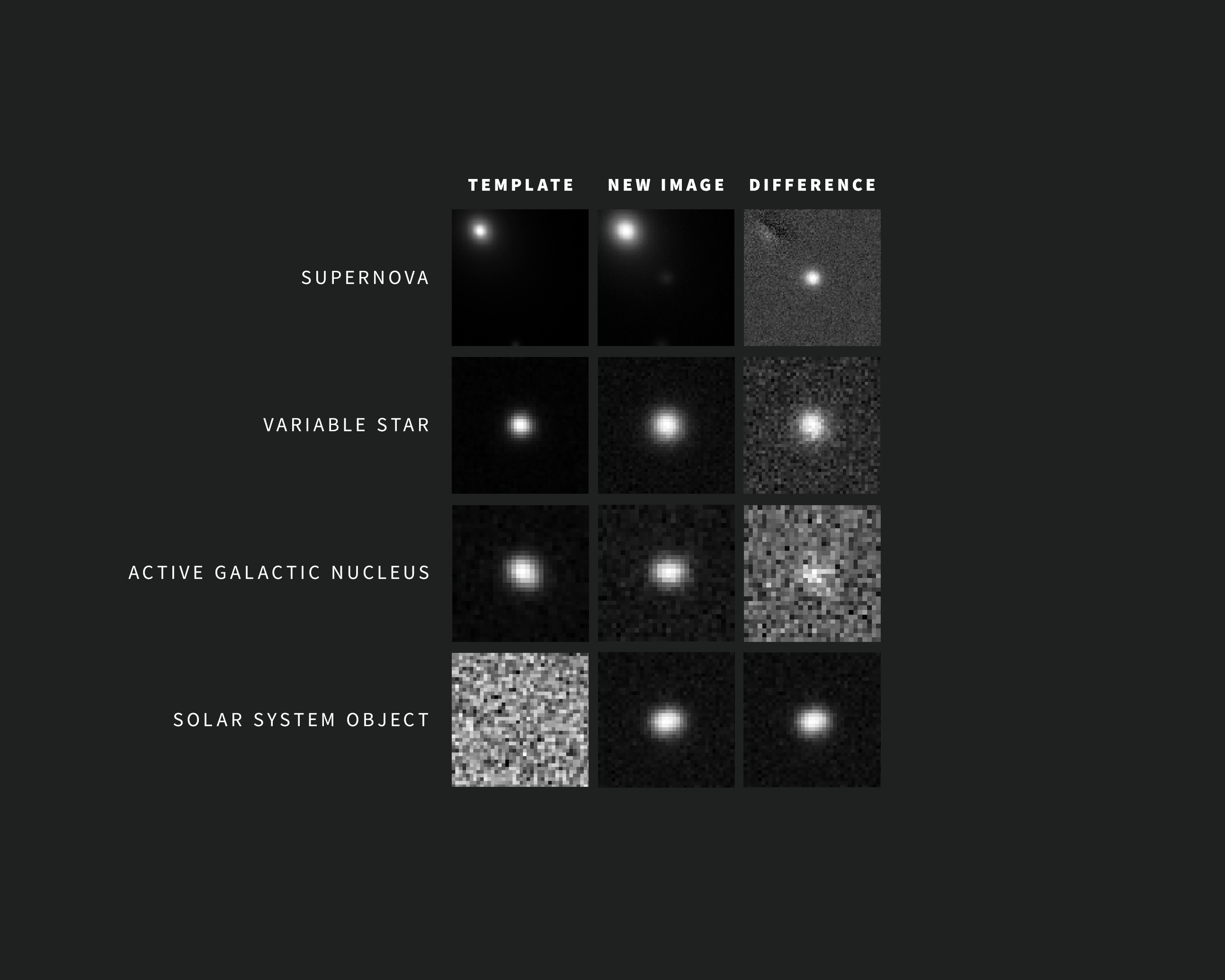
Examples of alerts generated by the Rubin Observatory's image-differencing pipeline during LSST Camera commissioning. Each row shows a triplet: the template image (left), the new image (center), and the difference image (right), which isolates changes in brightness or position. Alert types shown include supernovae, variable stars, active galactic nuclei, and solar system objects.

Scan of Flammarion engraving taken with the Rubin Observatory in September 2020

Allowing for maintenance, bad weather and other contingencies, the camera is expected to take more than 200,000 images (1.28 petabytes uncompressed) per year. Managing and effectively analyzing the images is expected to be the most technically difficult part of the project. An estimated 250 teraflops and 100 petabytes of storage are required to keep up with the data flow.

Images are processed according to three different timescales, prompt (within 60 seconds), daily, and annually.

Prompt products are alerts, issued within 60 seconds of observation, about objects that have changed brightness or position relative to archived images of that sky position. Transferring, processing, and differencing such large images within 60 seconds (previous methods took hours, on smaller images) is itself a significant software engineering problem. This processing is performed at a classified US government facility in California so events that would reveal secret assets can be identified; they are temporarily redacted for three days, by which time the data are less sensitive. The first alerts were generated in February 2026.

Up to 10 million alerts will be generated per night. Each alert includes:

- Alert and database ID that uniquely identifies an alert
- Photometric, astrometric, and shape characterization of the detected source
- 30×30 pixel (on average) cut-outs of the template and difference images (in FITS format)
- Time series (up to one year) of previous detections of this source
- Summary statistics ("features") computed for the time series

No proprietary period is associated with alerts—they are immediately available to the public, since the goal is to quickly transmit nearly everything the Observatory knows about any given event, enabling classification and decision making. Since most observers are interested in only a fraction of the events, alerts are fed to "event brokers" that forward selections to interested parties. The Observatory will provide a simple broker, and provide the full alert stream to external event brokers. The Zwicky Transient Facility serves as a prototype of the system, generating 1 million alerts per night.

Daily products, released within 24 hours of observation, comprise the images from that night, and the source catalogs derived from difference images. This includes orbital parameters for Solar System objects. Images will be available in two forms: Raw Snaps, or data straight from the camera, and Single Visit Images, which have been processed and include instrumental signature removal (ISR), background estimation, source detection, deblending and measurements, point spread function estimation, and astrometric and photometric calibration.

Annual release data products will be made available once a year, by re-processing the entire science data set to date. These include:

- Calibrated images
- Measurements of positions, fluxes, and shapes
- Variability information
- A description of light curves
- A uniform reprocessing of the difference-imaging-based prompt data products
- A catalog of roughly 6 million Solar System objects, with their orbits
- A catalog of approximately 37 billion sky objects (20 billion galaxies and 17 billion stars), each with more than 200 attributes

The annual release will be computed partially by the National Center for Supercomputing Applications, and partially by IN2P3 in France.

The Observatory reserves 10% of its computing power and storage for user-generated data products. These are produced by custom algorithms for specialized purposes, using application programming interfaces (APIs) to access the data and store the results. This avoids the need to transfer huge quantities of data by allowing users to use Observatory storage and compute directly. It also allows academic groups to define custom release policies.

An early version of the image processing software is used by the Subaru Telescope's Hyper Suprime-Cam instrument, a wide-field survey instrument with sensitivity similar to the Observatory but one-fifth the field of view: 1.8 square degrees (versus 9.6 for the Observatory). HelioLinc3D software was developed specifically for the Observatory, to detect moving objects.

LSST software pipelines are available as open source software on GitHub.

Future data releases include the Prompt Products Database (PPDB), planned for 30 November 2026, Data Preview 2 (DP2), planned for 15 December 2026, and Data Release 1 (DR1), planned for two years after the start of the survey.

== Scientific goals ==
Comparison of primary mirrors of several optical telescopes – the Rubin Observatory, in green, with its very large central hole, is near the center of the diagram.

The Observatory will image about 18000 deg^{2} of the southern sky with six filters in its main survey, with about 825 visits to each spot over 10 years. The 5σ (SNR greater than 5) magnitude limits are expected to be r < 24.5 in single images, and r < 27.8 in the full stacked data.

The main survey uses about 90% of the observing time. The remaining 10% is available for improved coverage for specific goals and regions. This includes deep (r ~ 26) observations, shorter revisit times (roughly one minute), observations of special regions such as the ecliptic, galactic plane, the Large and Small Magellanic Clouds, and areas covered in detail by multi-wavelength surveys such as COSMOS, the Chandra Deep Field South, and the upcoming Deep Synoptic Array radio survey. Combined, these special programs increase the total area to about 25000 deg^{2}.

Particular scientific goals include:

- Studying dark energy and dark matter by measuring weak gravitational lensing, baryon acoustic oscillations, and photometry of type Ia supernovae, all as a function of redshift.
- Mapping small objects in the Solar System, particularly near-Earth asteroids and Kuiper belt objects. The Rubin Observatory is expected to increase the number of cataloged objects by a factor of 10–100. It will also search for the hypothesized Planet Nine.
- Detecting transient astronomical events including novae, supernovae, gamma-ray bursts, quasar variability, and gravitational lensing, and providing prompt event notifications to facilitate follow-up.
- Mapping the Milky Way.

Because of its wide field of view and sensitivity, the Rubin Observatory is expected to be among the best prospects for detecting optical counterparts to gravitational wave events detected by LIGO and other observatories.

NASA has been tasked by the U.S. Congress with detecting and cataloging 90% of the near-Earth orbit population of size 140 meters or greater by 2020. The Observatory is estimated to be capable of detecting 62% of such objects, and according to the United States National Academy of Sciences, extending its survey from ten years to twelve is the most cost-effective way of finishing the task.

The Observatory has a program of Education and Public Outreach (EPO) that serves four main categories of users: the general public, educators, citizen scientists, and content developers at informal science education facilities. The Observatory will partner with Zooniverse for a number of their citizen science projects.

== Comparison with other sky surveys ==
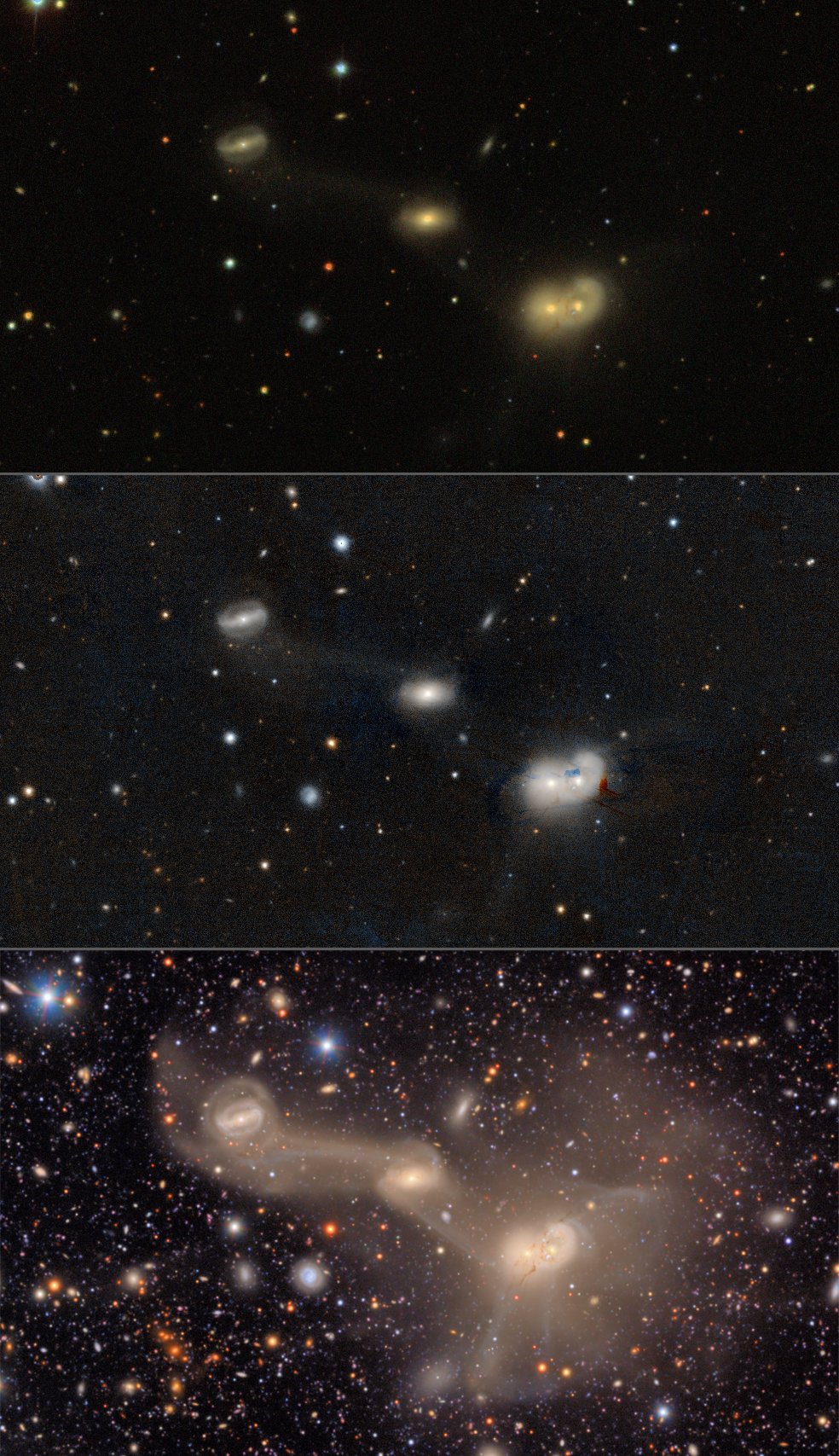
The same area of sky in three surveys including object NGC 4410 in the Virgo Cluster. From top to bottom images are from the Sloan Digital Sky Survey, Pan-STARRS, and the Rubin Observatory First Look. These have limiting magnitudes around 21, 22, and 27 respectively.

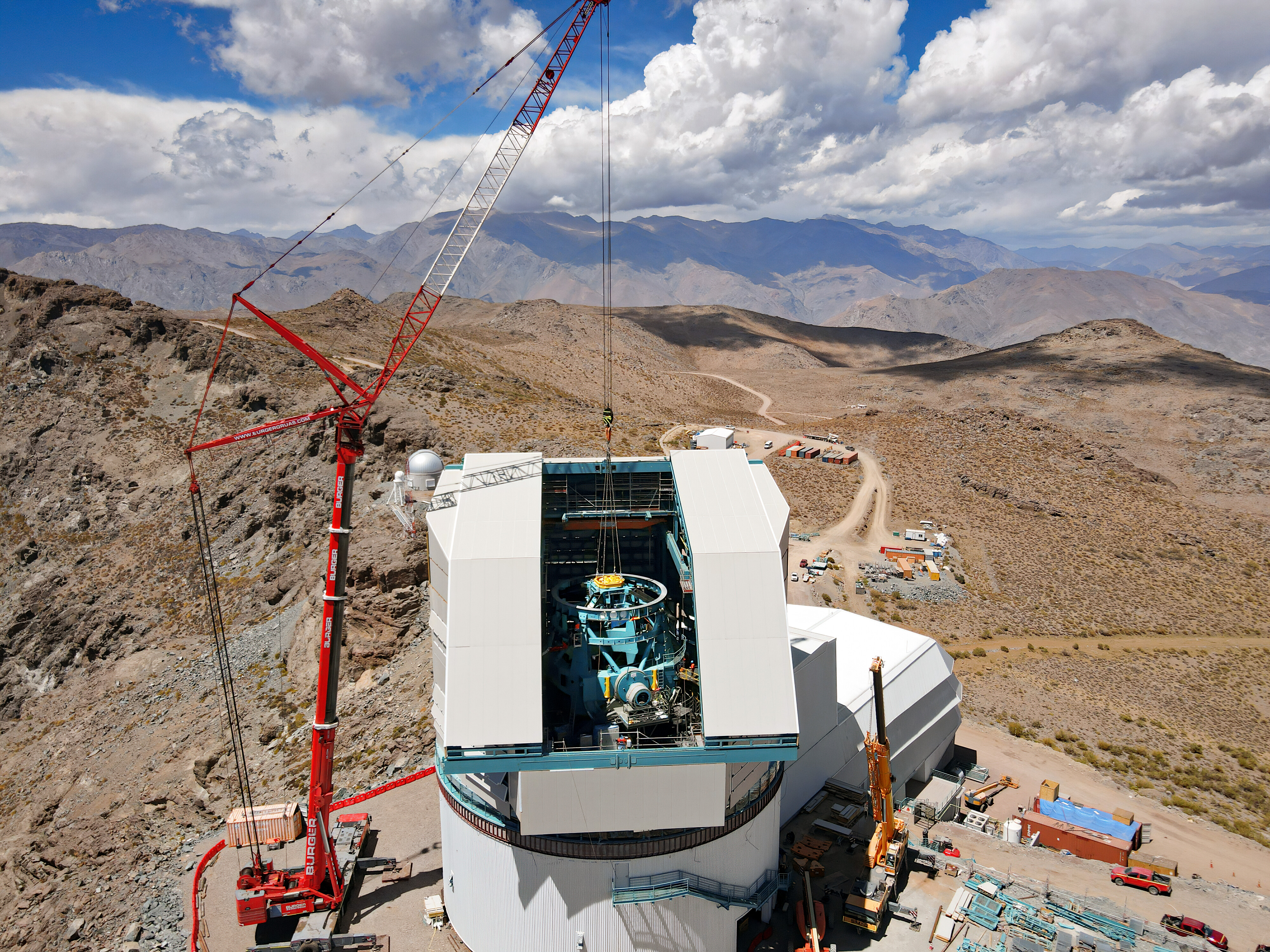
Top-end assembly lowered by a 500-ton capacity crane (March 2021)

Many other optical sky surveys have been conducted, some on-going, and the main ones are listed here. For comparison, the Rubin magnitude limits are expected to be r < 24.5 in single images, and r < 27.8 in the full stacked data.

- The Harvard Plate Stacks systemically photographed the night sky starting in the 1880s. This was done from observatories that the Harvard College Observatory established in North America, in Arequipa, Peru, and Bloemfontein, South Africa. This was used in the creation of the Henry Draper Catalogue as well as the "Harvard Map of the Sky" in 1917 which published the first image of the visible universe across 74 photographic plates. The plates were made through the 1980s and capture every area of the night sky on at least 500–1,000 plates across a century of observations. These plates were studied by pioneering female astronomers called Harvard Computers. They were digitized in the DASCH project in anticipation of the Rubin Observatory, and have recently been made available with an API through a 1.2 petabyte database called StarGlass.
- Photographic sky surveys, such as the National Geographic Society – Palomar Observatory Sky Survey and its digitized version, the Digitized Sky Survey. This technology is obsolete, with much less depth and generally taken from locations with less-than-excellent views. These archives remain in use, for their lengthy time interval—more than 100 years in some cases—and cover the entire sky. The plate scans reached a limit of R~18 and B~19.5 over 90% of the sky, and about one magnitude fainter over 50% of the sky.
- The Optical Gravitational Lensing Experiment (OGLE) (since 1992) is a variability survey of the Galactic bulge, Galactic disk, and Magellanic Clouds (imaging about 4100 square degrees of the sky) with the 1.3-meter Warsaw telescope located at Las Campanas Observatory, Chile. About 95% of the observations are in the I-band, while the rest are in the V-band, with the following brightness limits: 21.5 and 22.5 mag, respectively. By the end of 2024, the survey had collected 1.2 million exposures (about 500 TB of time-series data) for over 2 billion stars.
- The Sloan Digital Sky Survey (SDSS) (2000–2009) surveyed 14,555 square degrees of the northern-hemisphere sky with a 2.5-meter telescope. It continues as a spectrographic survey. Its limiting photometric magnitude ranged from 20.5 to 22.2, depending on the filter.
- Pan-STARRS (since 2010) is an ongoing sky survey using two wide-field 1.8-meter Ritchey–Chrétien telescopes located at Haleakala in Hawaii. Until the Observatory began operation, it remained the best detector of near-Earth objects. Its coverage, 30,000 square degrees, is comparable to the Observatory coverage. The single-image depth in the PS1 survey was between magnitude 20.9–22.0, depending on filter.
- The DESI Legacy Imaging Surveys (since 2013) looks at 14,000 square degrees of the northern and southern sky with the Bok 2.3-meter telescope, the 4-meter Mayall telescope, and the 4-meter Víctor M. Blanco Telescope. The Legacy Surveys make use of the Mayall z-band Legacy Survey, the Beijing–Arizona Sky Survey, and the Dark Energy Survey. The Legacy Surveys avoided the Milky Way to concentrate on distant galaxies. The area of DES (5000 deg^{2}) is entirely contained within the Observatory's survey area. Its exposures typically reach magnitude 23–24.
- Gaia was a space-based survey of the entire sky from 2014 to March 2025, whose primary goal is extremely precise astrometry of roughly two billion stars, quasars, galaxies, and Solar System objects. Its collecting area of 0.7 m^{2} did not allow observation of objects as faint as can be included in other surveys, but the location of each object observed is known with far greater precision. While not taking exposures in the traditional sense, it detected objects up to a magnitude of 21.
- The Zwicky Transient Facility (since 2018) is a similar, rapid, wide-field survey to detect transient events. The telescope has an even larger field of view (47 deg^{2}; 5× the field), but a significantly smaller aperture (1.22 m; 1/30 the area). It is being used to develop and test the Observatory automated alert software. Its exposures typically reach magnitude 20–21.
- The Space Surveillance Telescope (since 2011) is a similar rapid wide-field survey telescope used primarily for military applications, with secondary civil applications including space debris and NEO detection and cataloging.

== Construction ==
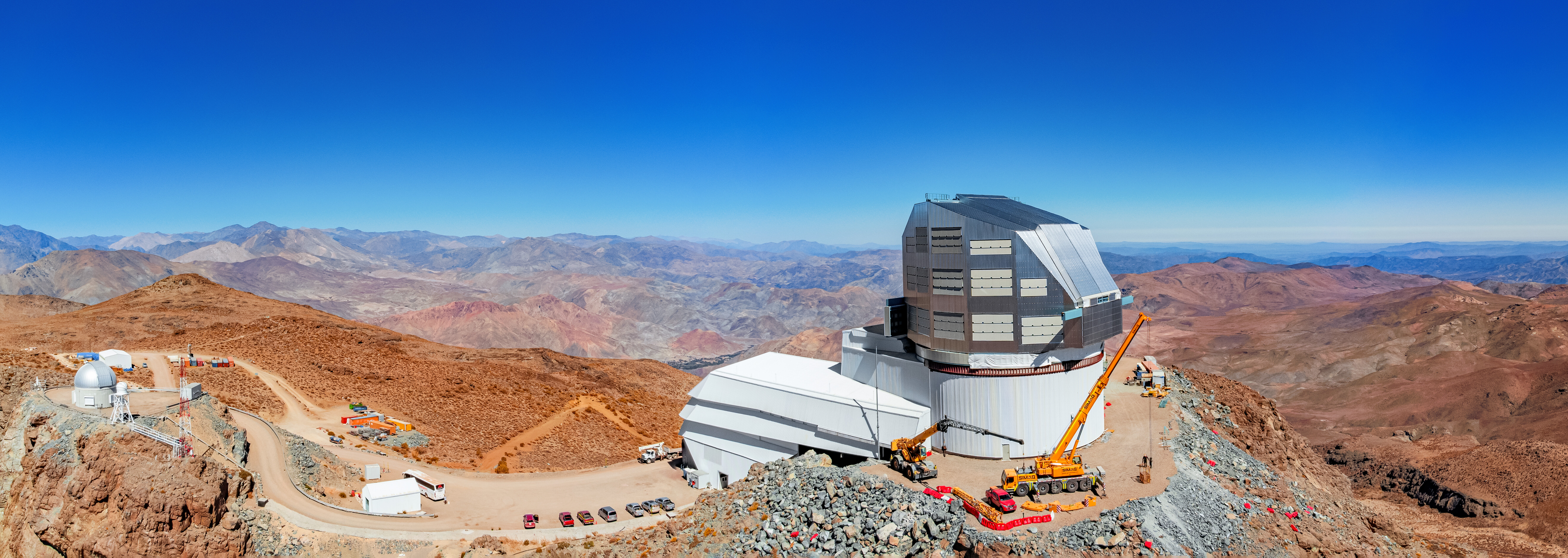
Construction progress as of 2022

The Cerro Pachón site was selected in May 2006, beating out the alternative Sierra de San Pedro Mártir site. The main factors were the frequency of clear nights, weather patterns, and the image quality permitted by the local atmosphere (seeing). The site also had to have existing observatory infrastructure, to minimize construction costs, and access to fiber optic links, to handle the data flux.

In March 2020, work on the summit facility and the main camera at SLAC, was suspended due to the pandemic, though work on software continued. During this time, the commissioning camera reached the base facility and was tested. It was moved to the summit and installed in August 2022.

=== Mirrors ===
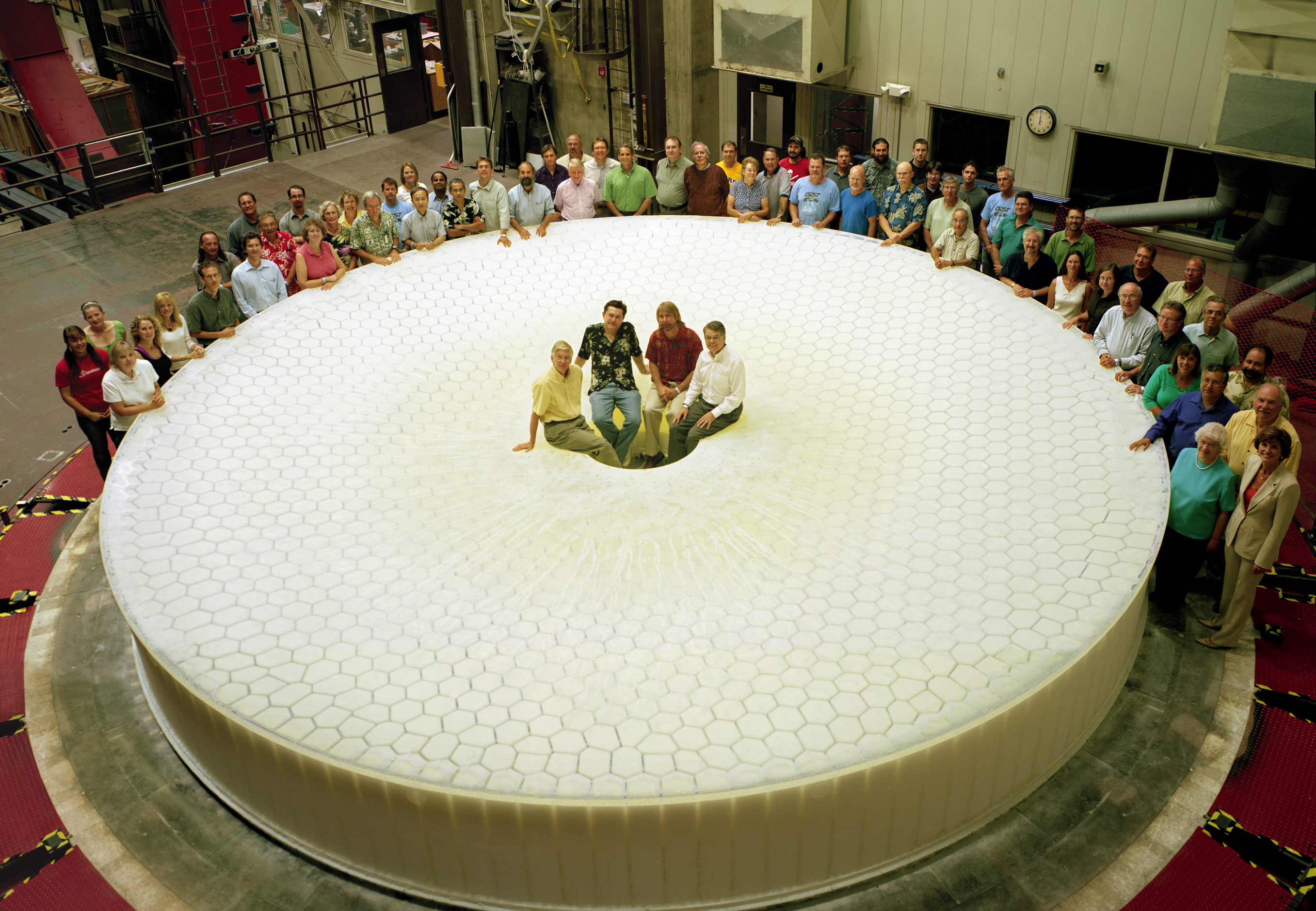
The primary/tertiary mirror, August 2008

The primary mirror, the most critical and time-consuming element, was made over a seven-year period by the University of Arizona's Steward Observatory Mirror Lab. Construction of the mold began in November 2007, mirror casting was begun in March 2008, and the mirror blank was declared "perfect" at the beginning of September 2008.

Polishing of the primary/tertiary mirror was completed in 2015 and it was formally accepted on 13 February 2015, then placed in the mirror transport box. In October 2018, it was moved back to the mirror lab and integrated with the mirror support cell. It went through additional testing in January/February 2019. In March 2019, it was trucked to Houston, Texas, traveled by ship to Chile, and arrived on the summit in May. In April 2024, it was re-united with the mirror support cell and coated.

The coating chamber, which was used to coat the mirrors once they arrived, itself arrived at the summit in November 2018.

The secondary mirror was manufactured by Corning of ultra low expansion glass and coarse-ground to within 40 μm of the desired shape. In November 2009, the blank was shipped to Harvard University, pending funding to complete it. On 21 October 2014, it was delivered to Exelis (now a subsidiary of Harris Corporation) for fine grinding. The completed mirror was delivered to Chile on 7 December 2018, and was coated in July 2019.

=== Building ===
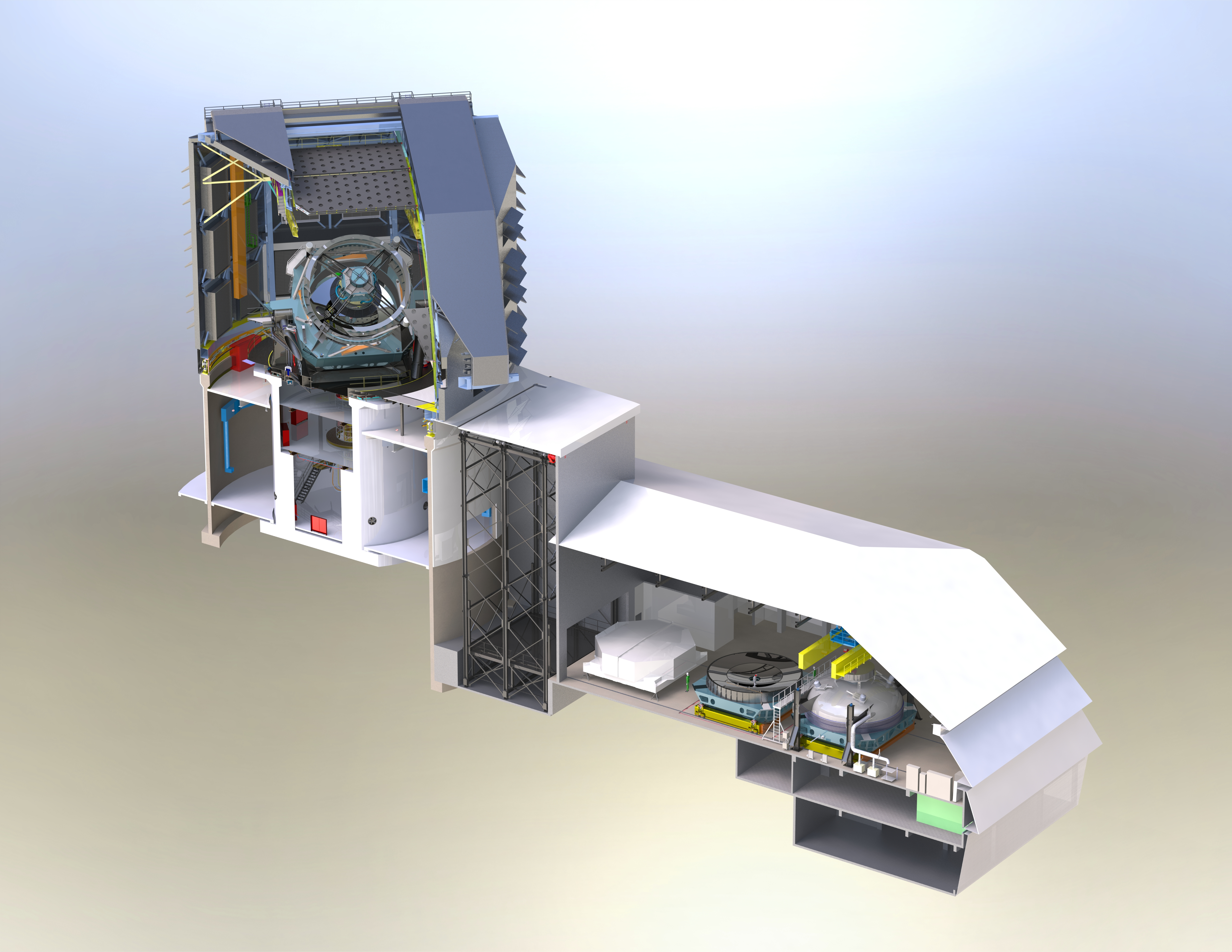
Cutaway rendering

Site excavation began in earnest on 8 March 2011.

In 2015, a large amount of broken rock and clay was found under the site of the support building. This caused a six-week construction delay. This did not affect the telescope proper or its dome.

The building was declared substantially complete in March 2018. The then-incomplete dome first rotated under its own power in November 2019.

=== Telescope mount assembly ===
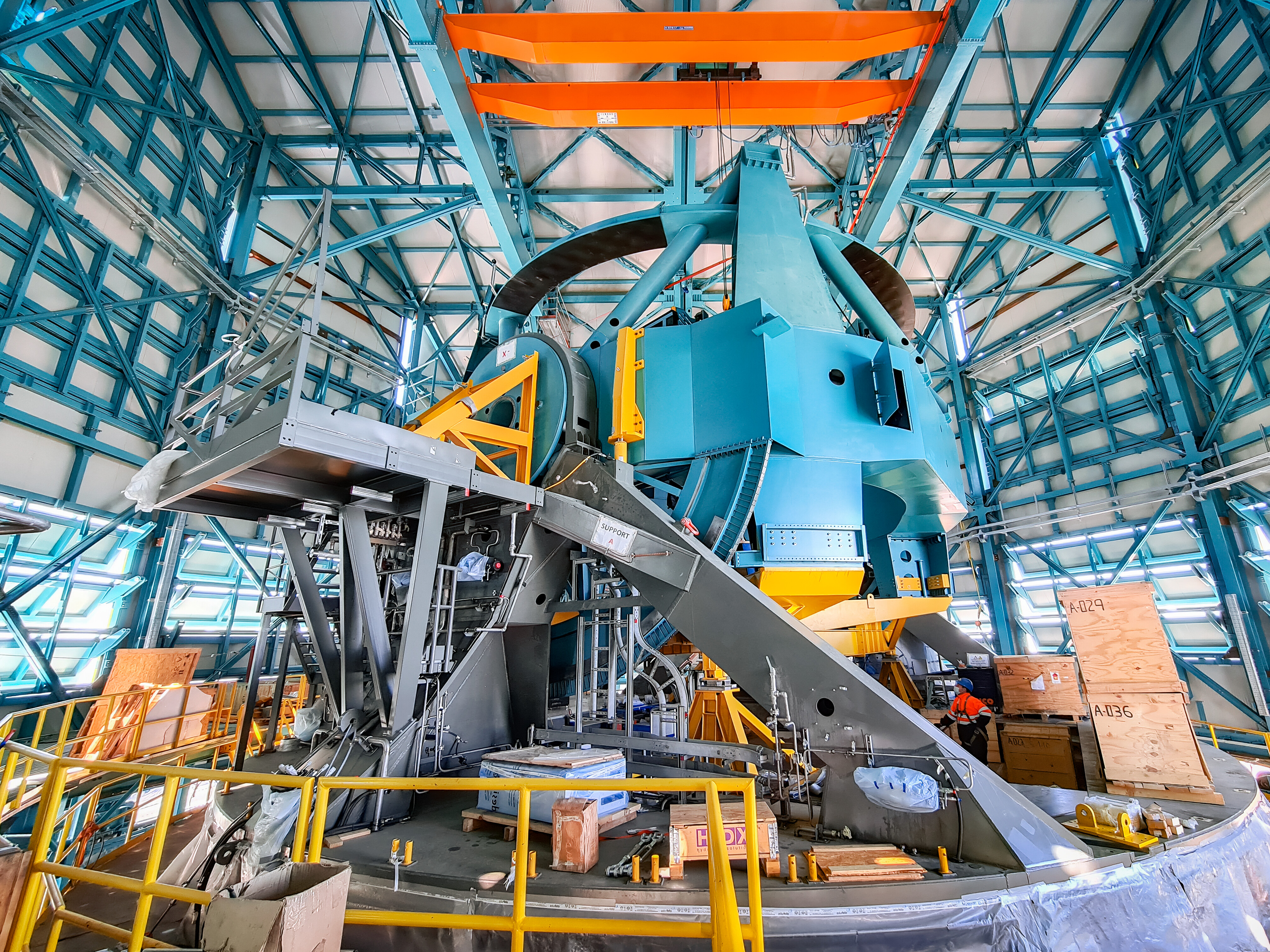
Telescope Mount Assembly of the 8.4-meter Simonyi Survey Telescope

The telescope mount, and the pier on which it sits, are themselves substantial engineering projects. The main technical challenge was that the telescope must slew 3.5° to the adjacent field and settle within four seconds. Five seconds are allowed between exposures, but one second is reserved for the mirrors and instrument to be aligned, leaving four seconds to move the structure. This requires a stiff pier and telescope mount, with high-speed slew and acceleration (10°/sec and 10°/sec^{2}, respectively). The basic design is conventional: an altitude over azimuth mount made of steel, with hydrostatic bearings on both axes, mounted on a pier that is isolated from the dome foundations. The Observatory pier is unusually large (16 m diameter), robust (1.25-meter-thick walls) and mounted directly to virgin bedrock, where care was taken during site excavation to avoid using explosives that would crack it. Other unusual design features are linear motors on the main axes and a recessed floor on the mount. This allows the telescope to extend slightly below the azimuth bearings, lowering its center of gravity.

The contract for the assembly was signed in August 2014. It passed its acceptance tests in 2018 and arrived at the site in September 2019. By April 2023, the mount was declared "essentially complete" and turned over to the Observatory.

=== Camera ===
In August 2015, the LSST Camera project, separately funded by the U.S. Department of Energy (DoE), passed its "critical decision 3" design review. On 31 August, construction began at SLAC. By September 2018, the cryostat was complete, the lenses ground, and 12 of the 21 CCD rafts had been delivered. As of September 2020, the entire focal plane was undergoing testing. By October 2021, the last of the six filters had been finished and delivered. By November 2021, the entire camera had been cooled to its required operating temperature, allowing final testing.

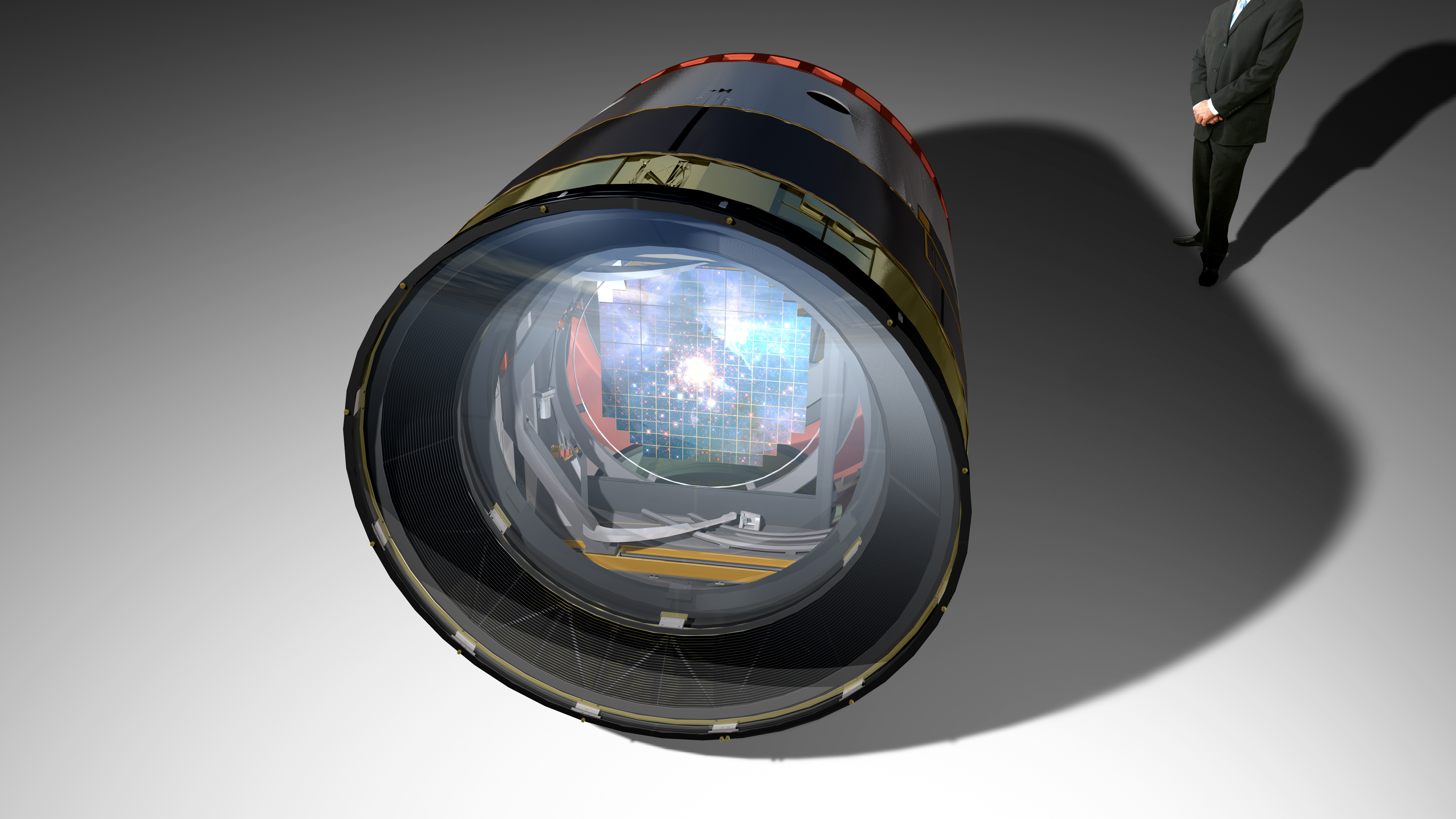
Rendering of the Rubin Observatory camera

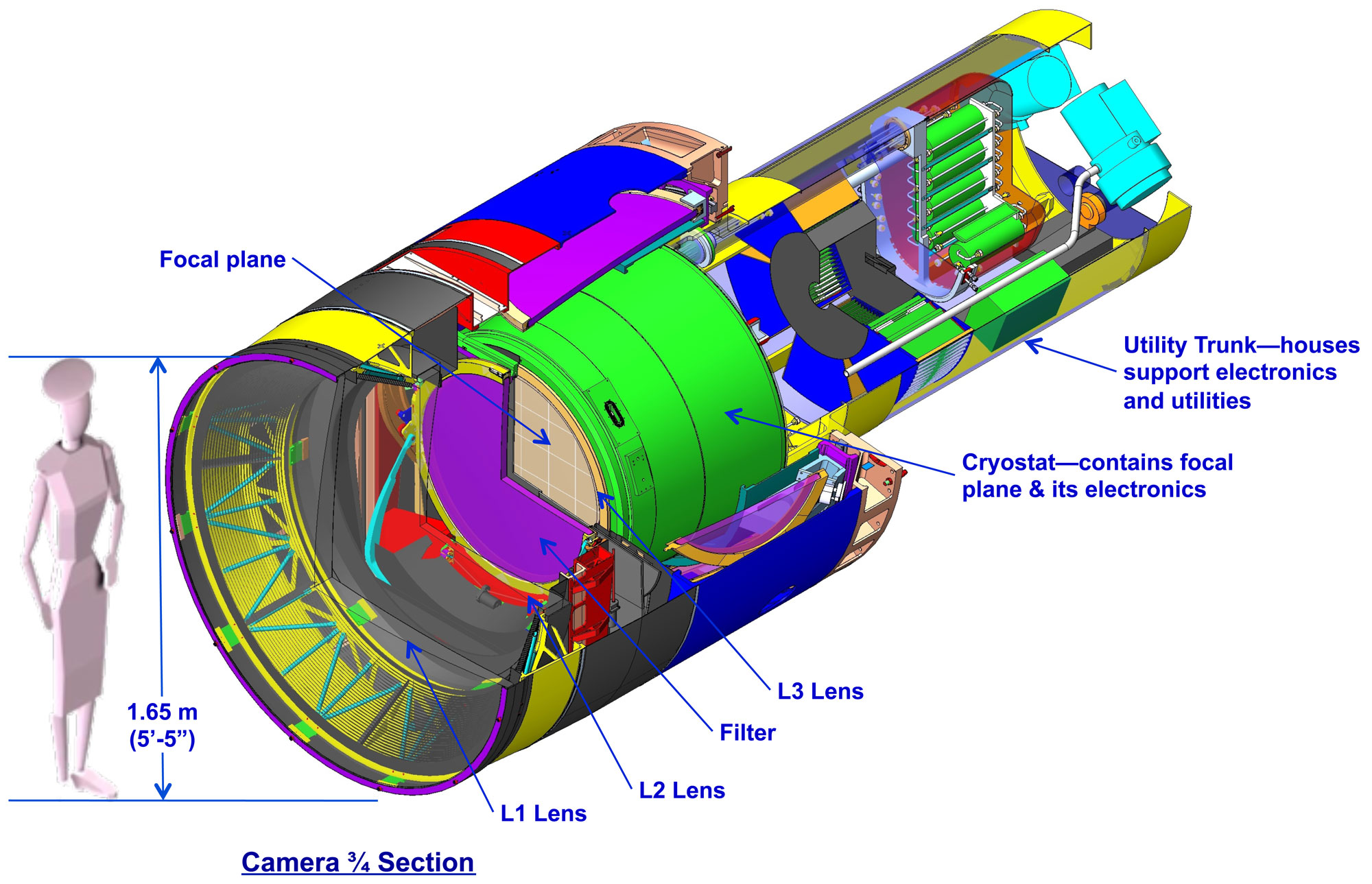
Color-coded cutaway drawing of the Rubin Observatory camera

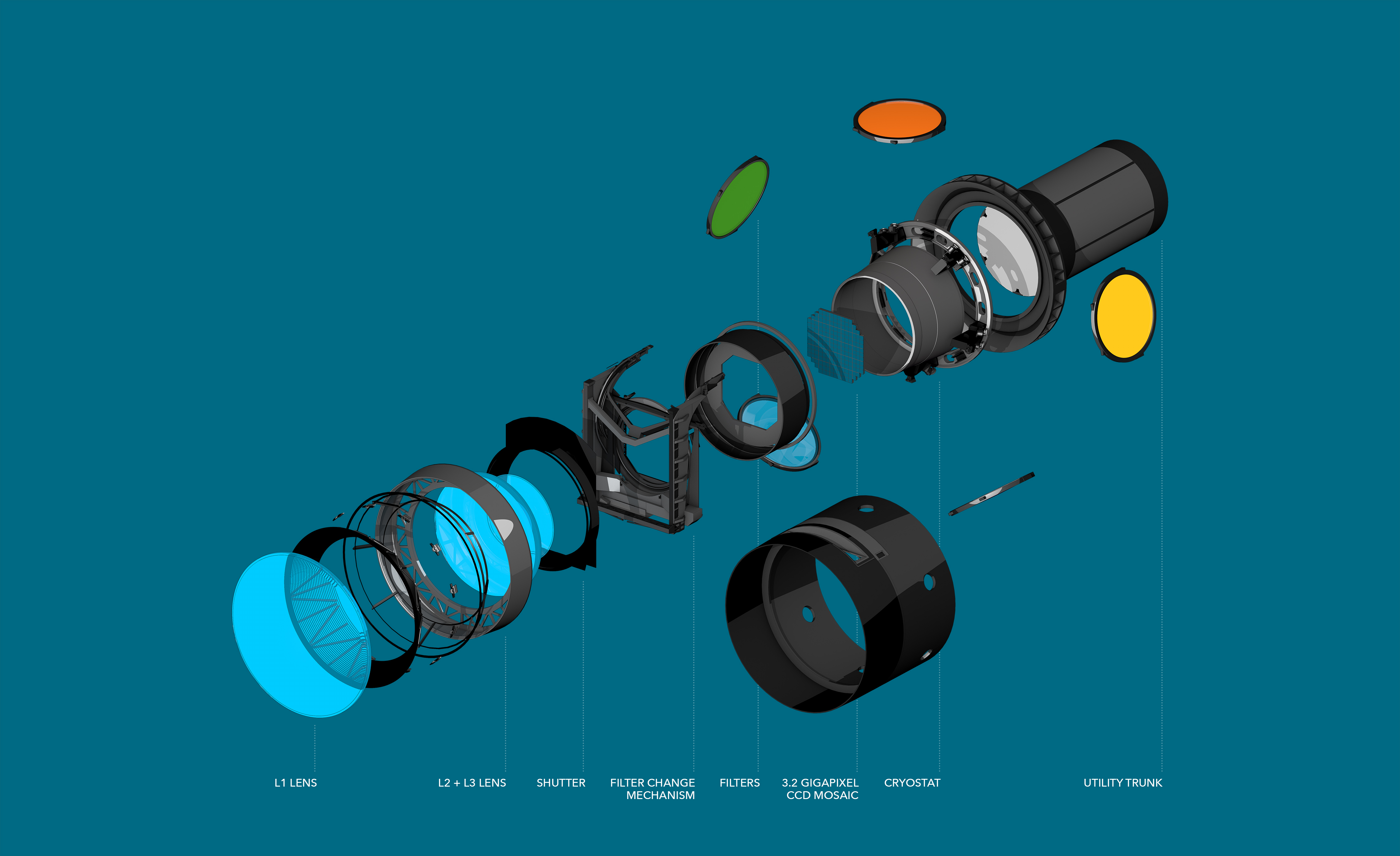
Exploded view of the optical components of the Rubin Observatory camera

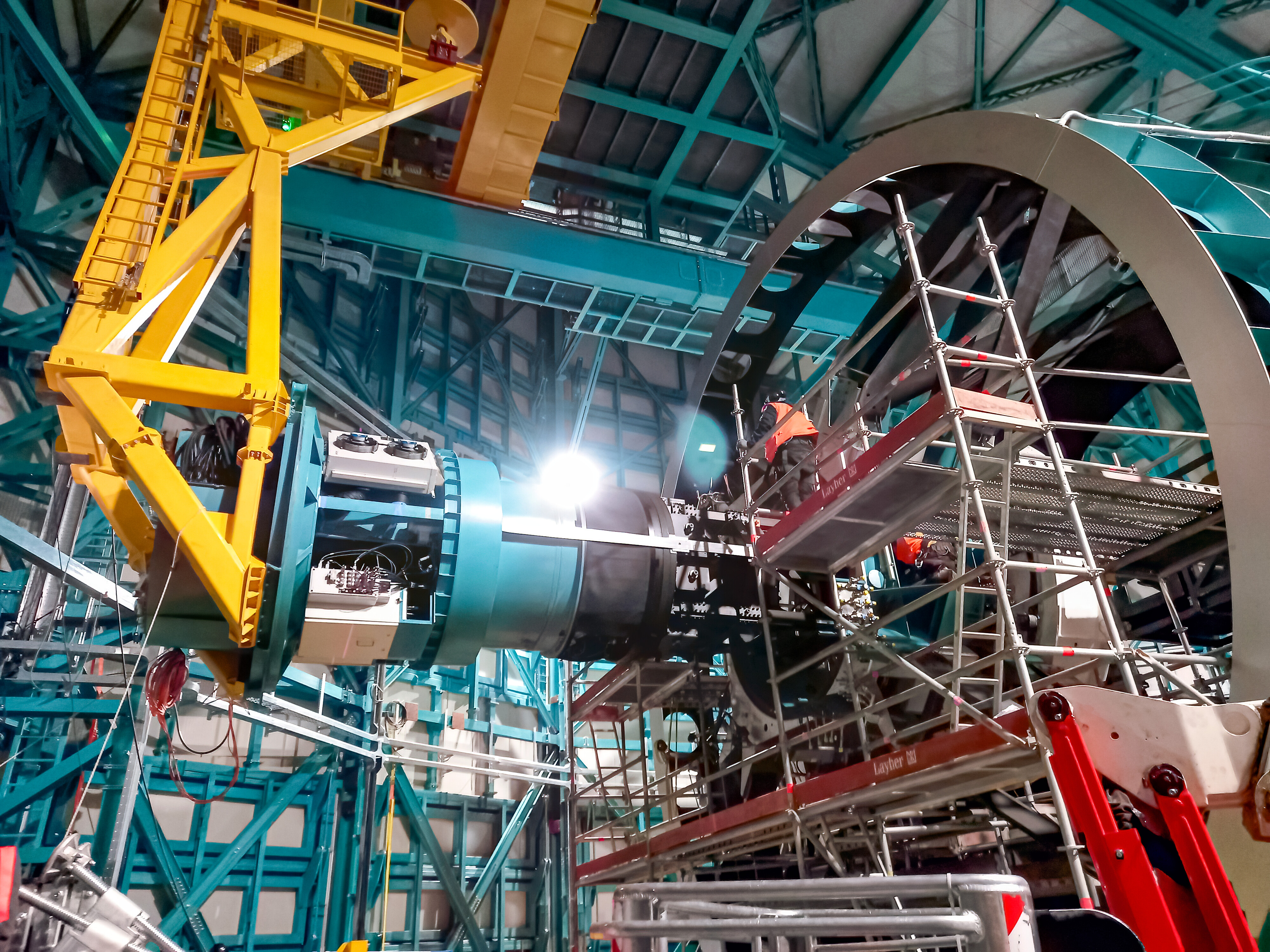
Vera C. Rubin Observatory Commissioning Camera install

Before the final camera installation, a smaller and simpler version (the Commissioning Camera, or ComCam) was used "to perform early telescope alignment and commissioning tasks, complete engineering first light, and possibly produce early usable science data".

The camera was reported complete in early 2024. The camera arrived at the observatory in May 2024, and was installed in March 2025.

=== Data transport and redaction ===
The data must be transported from the camera at the summit, to the base facilities, and then to the Rubin Observatory United States Data Facility (USDF) at SLAC. Data is routed via a $5 million dedicated encrypted network to a United States Intelligence Community facility in California. An automated system detects events, filters events containing sensitive objects, and releases imagery covering the remaining events to the scientific community after one minute. Complete images are released 80 hours later, after the satellites' orbits change, avoiding the permanent redaction done to images from the Pan-STARRS survey.

This transfer must be 100 Gbit/s or better and reliable, since the USDF is where the data is processed into scientific data products, including real-time alerts of transient events. This transfer uses multiple fiber optic cables to reach Santiago, Chile, then via redundant routes to Miami, Florida, where it connects to existing high speed conduits. These links were activated in March 2018 by the AmLight consortium.

Since the data crosses international borders, many groups are involved. These include the Association of Universities for Research in Astronomy (AURA, Chile, and the US), REUNA (Chile), Florida International University (US), AmLightExP (US), RNP (Brazil), and USDF (US), all of which participate in the Rubin Observatory Network Engineering Team (NET). This collaboration designs and delivers end-to-end network performance across network domains and providers.

== Satellite constellations ==
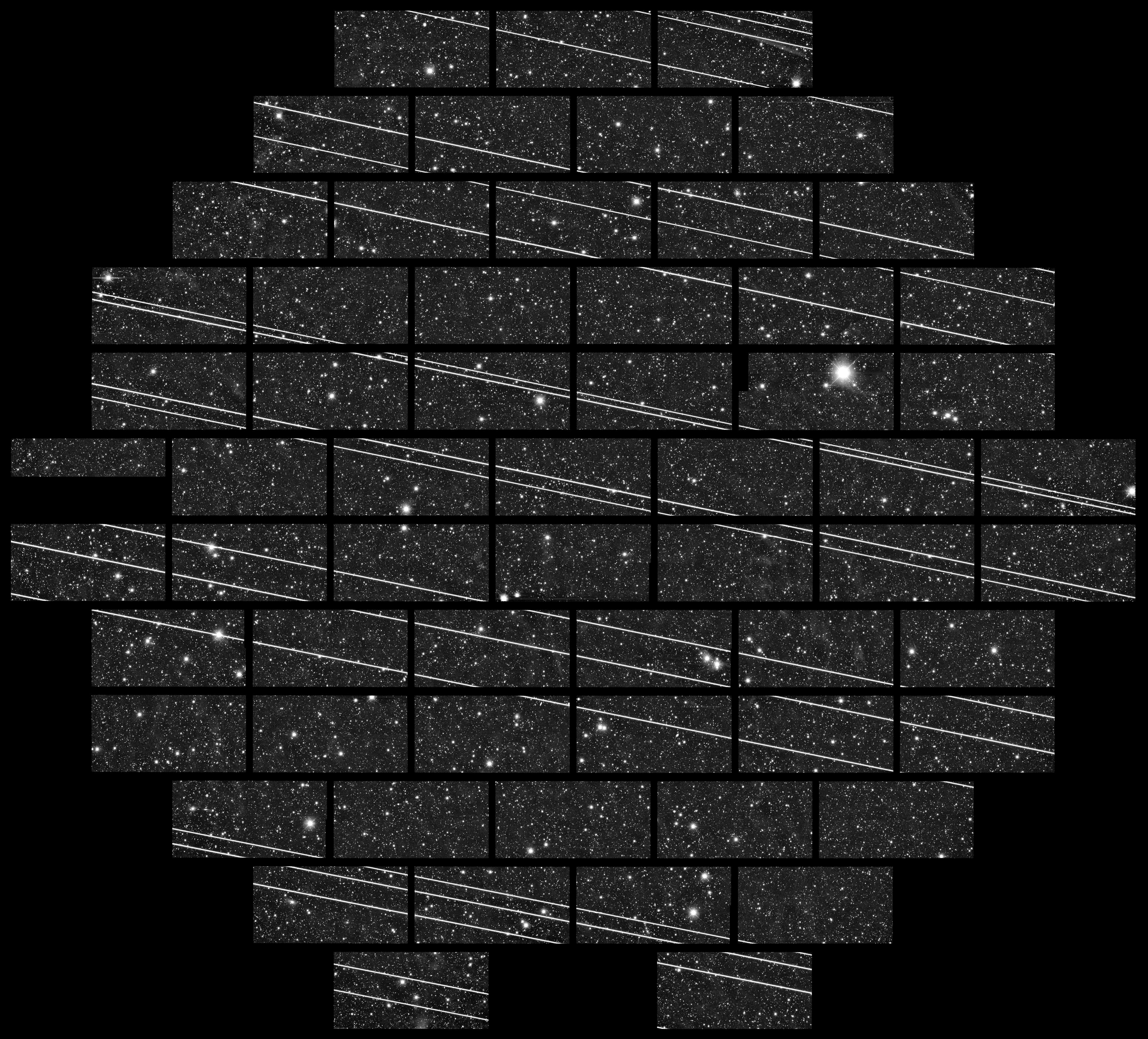
333 second-exposure image of the night sky containing 19 or more streaks due to Starlink satellite's light pollution – image from CTIO's Dark Energy Camera that has a similar field of view to the Rubin Observatory camera

While taking a long exposure, a satellite can cross the field of view, leaving a streak on the image. While it is possible to model and remove a streak, the residual Poisson noise lowers the signal-to-noise ratio of the corrected pixels too much to be of scientific value. The issue came to prominence when a satellite train crossed an image taken by Cerro Tololo Inter-American Observatory (CTIO).

Starlink has launched 7,000 satellites to low Earth orbit (LEO), with plans to expand to 12,000 and then to 34,400. Even if the Starlink constellation does not reach its planned size, the Project Kuiper and OneWeb LEO satellite constellations led to concern about how satellites could affect astronomical images. Estimates suggested that 30–40% of the images taken early and late at night could be compromised. This will impact science missions such as the observation of near-Earth objects. These must be observed in the same time frame as satellites as both need illumination by the Sun near twilight before they are obscured by the Earth's shadow.

The Observatory has simulated altering their observing strategy to avoid satellite streaks. They found that this would increase slew times, sacrificing around 10% of observing time, to decrease the number of satellite streaks by a factor of two. Studies reported that even in the regime of very large satellite constellations (30,000 satellites), 8% of all science images would have a satellite streak, costing around 0.04% of the total number of science pixels.

== Gallery ==
=== Observations ===
Video beginning with two galaxies and zooming out to reveal about 10 million galaxies combining over 1100 images (0m58s)

Trifid Nebula (top) and the Lagoon Nebula in a video combining 678 images (1min)

A small section of the Virgo Cluster

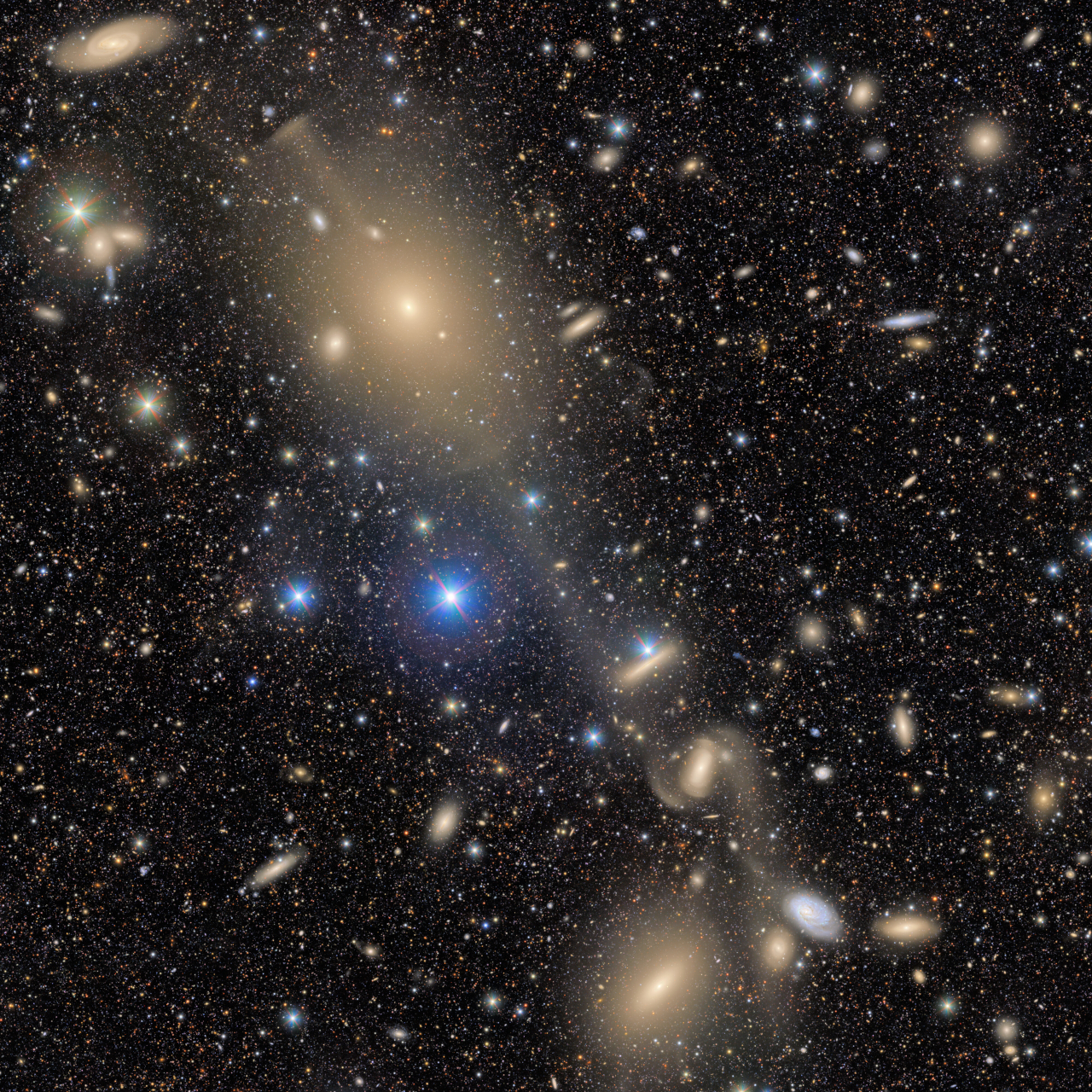
NGC 4261 is the large elliptical galaxy at the top of the image.

Four examples of objects found in the Trifid Nebula and Lagoon Nebula

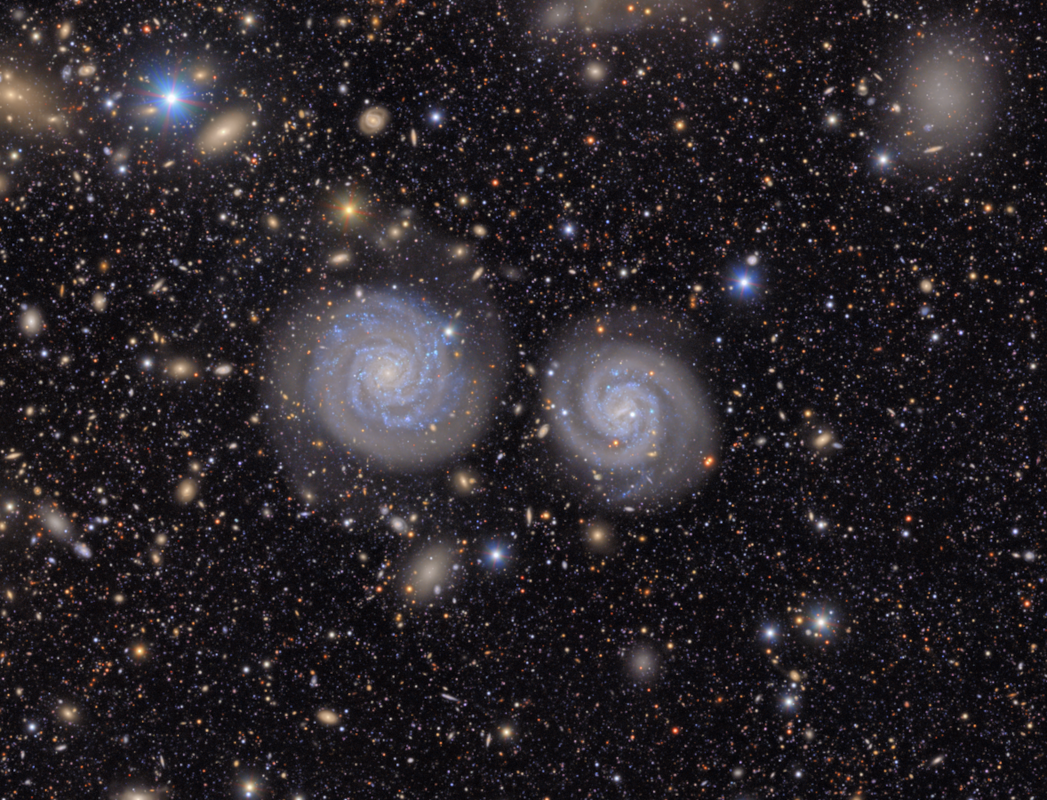
The spiral galaxies NGC 4411B (left) and NGC 4411 (right) taken from "The Cosmic Treasure Chest"

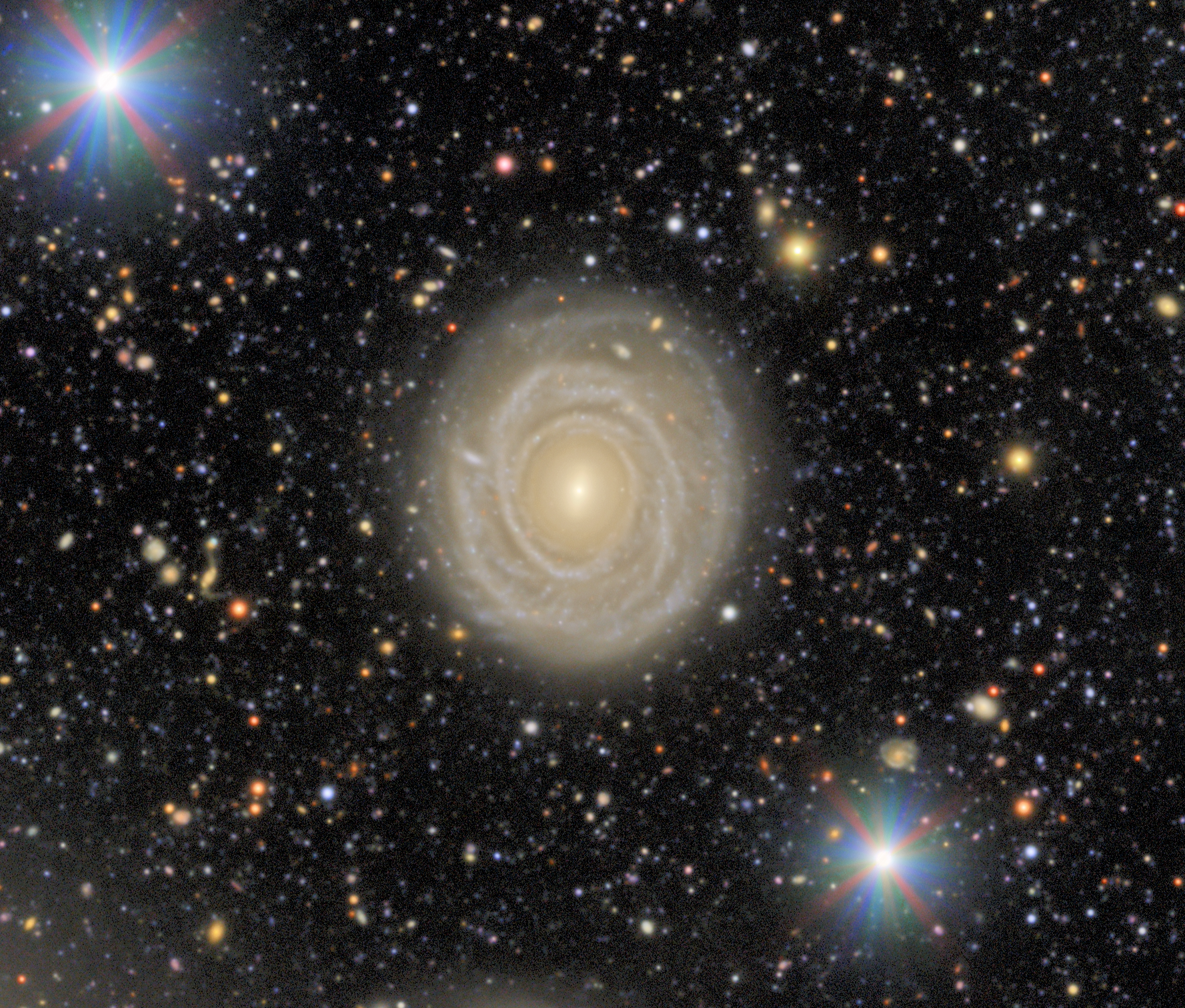
NGC 4326

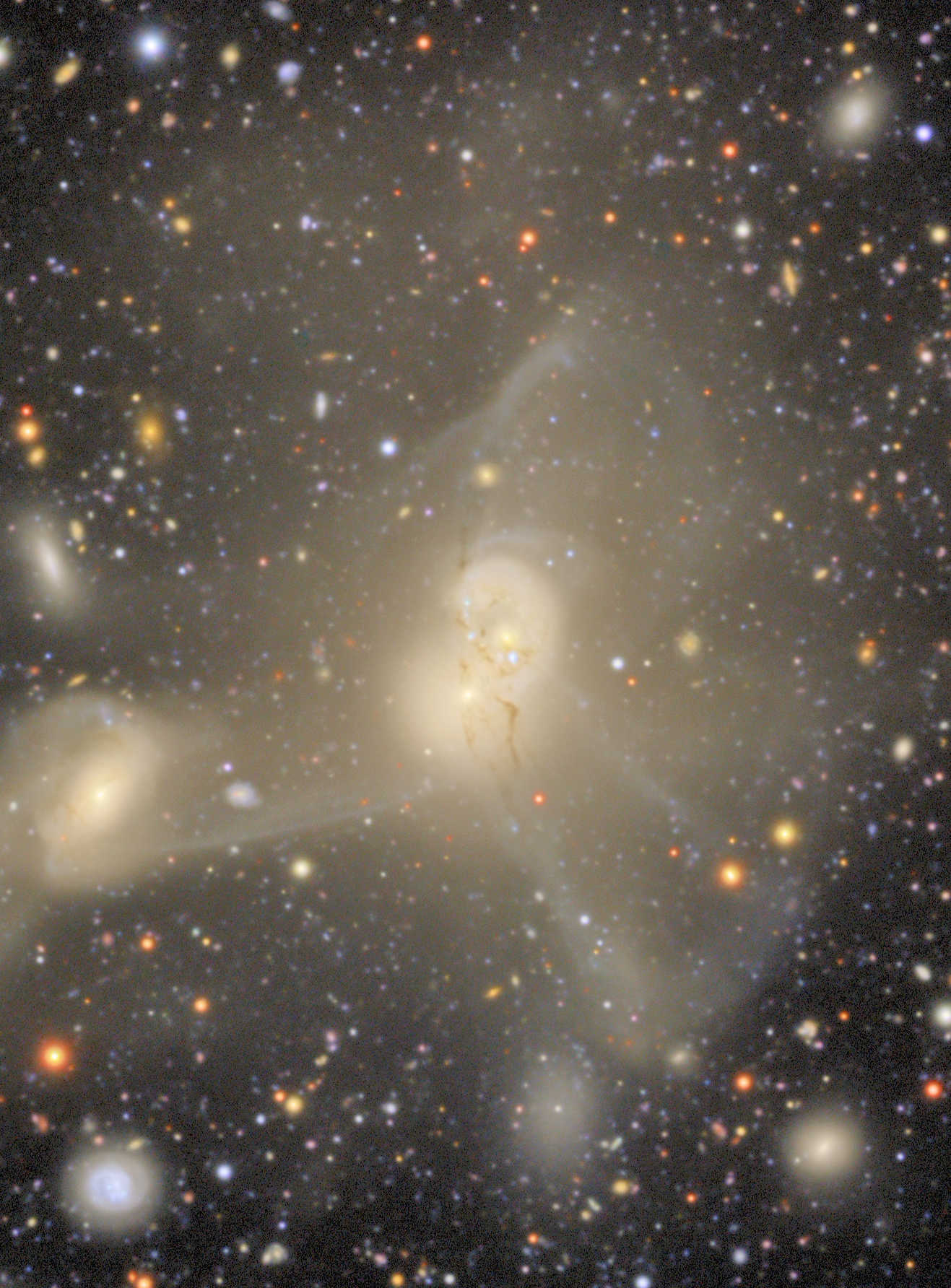
NGC 4410

=== Observatory ===
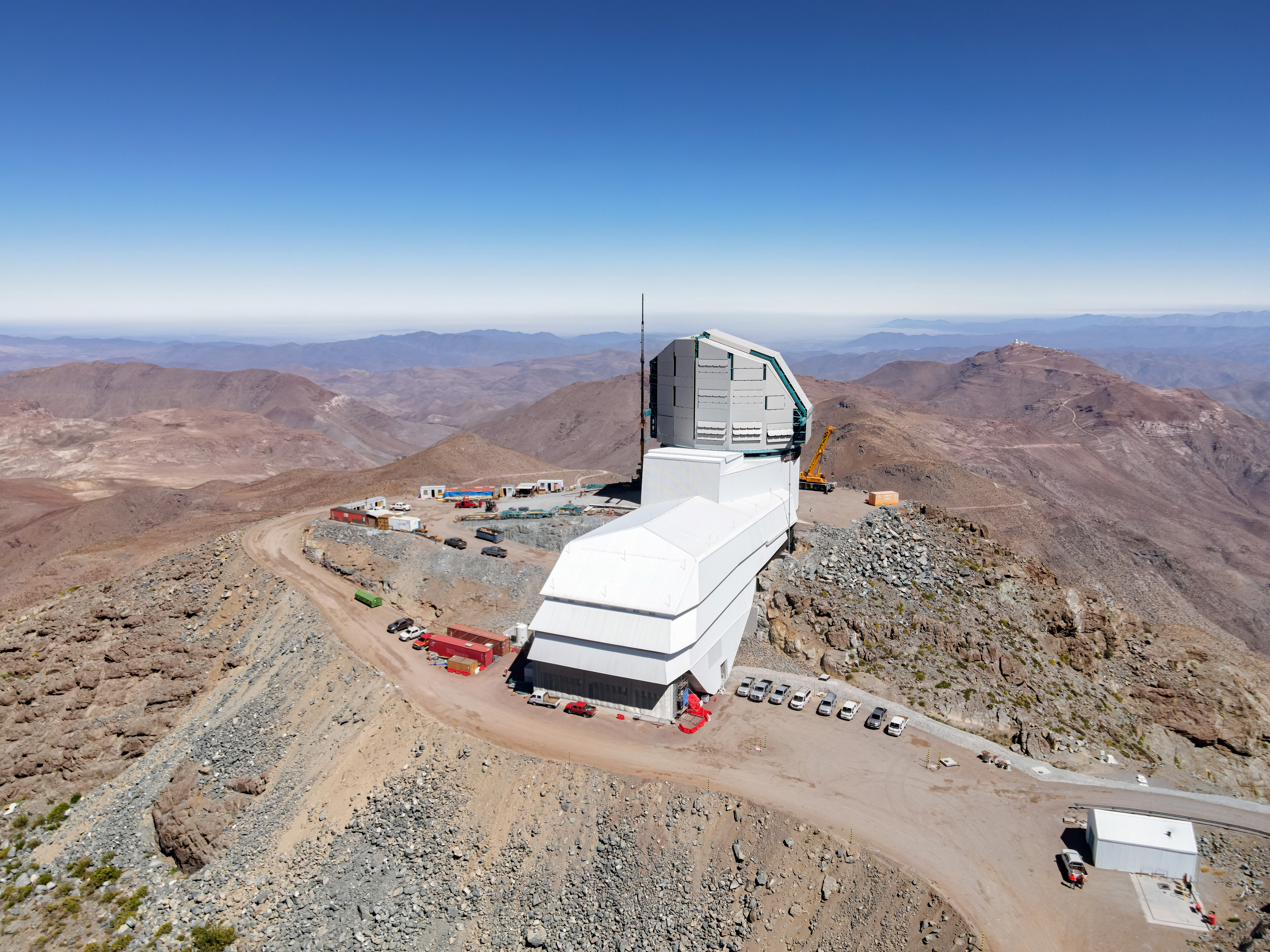
Clear skies at Cerro Pachón

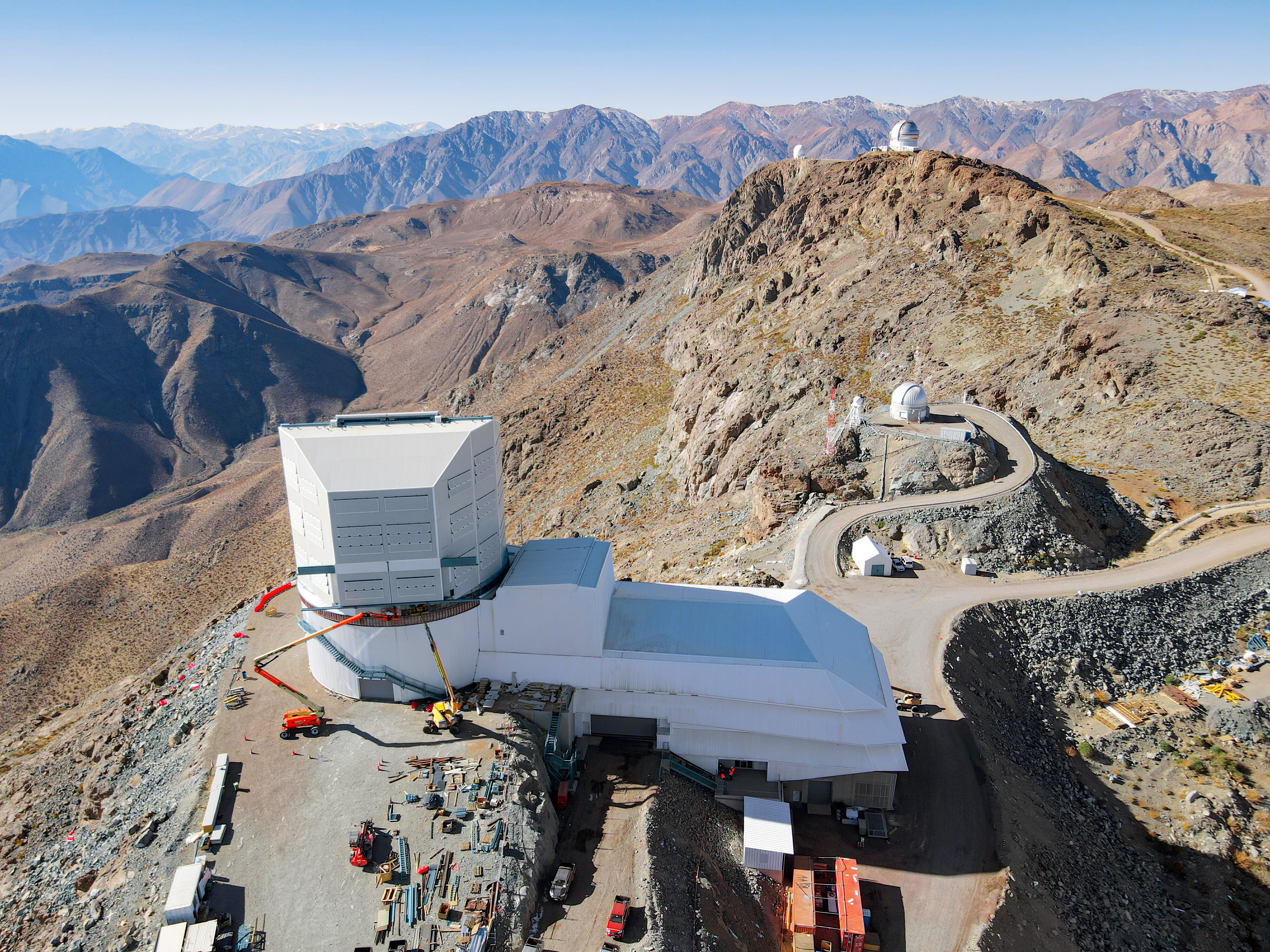
Construction

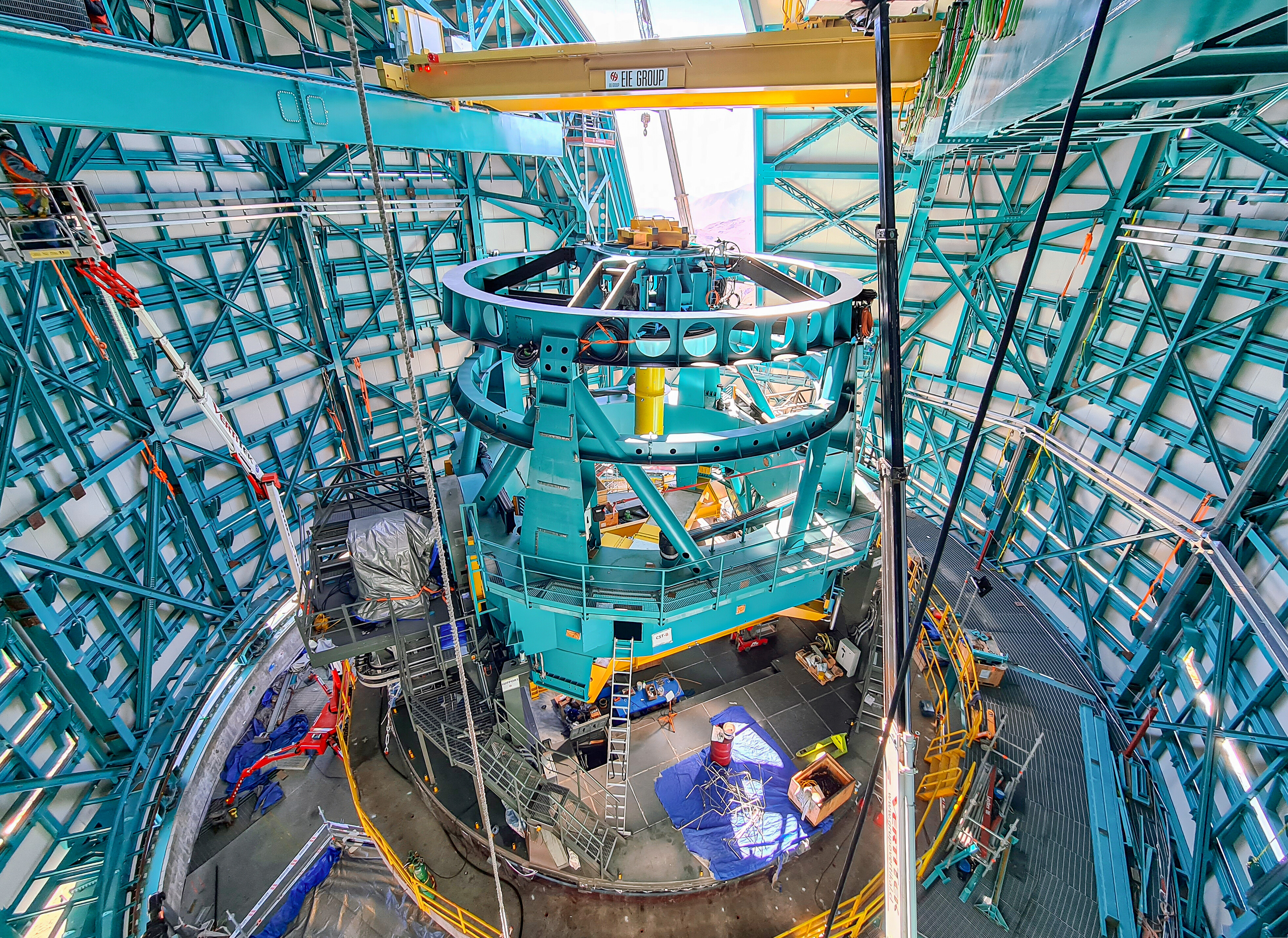
Telescope mount assembly, taken from the dome during bridge crane installation

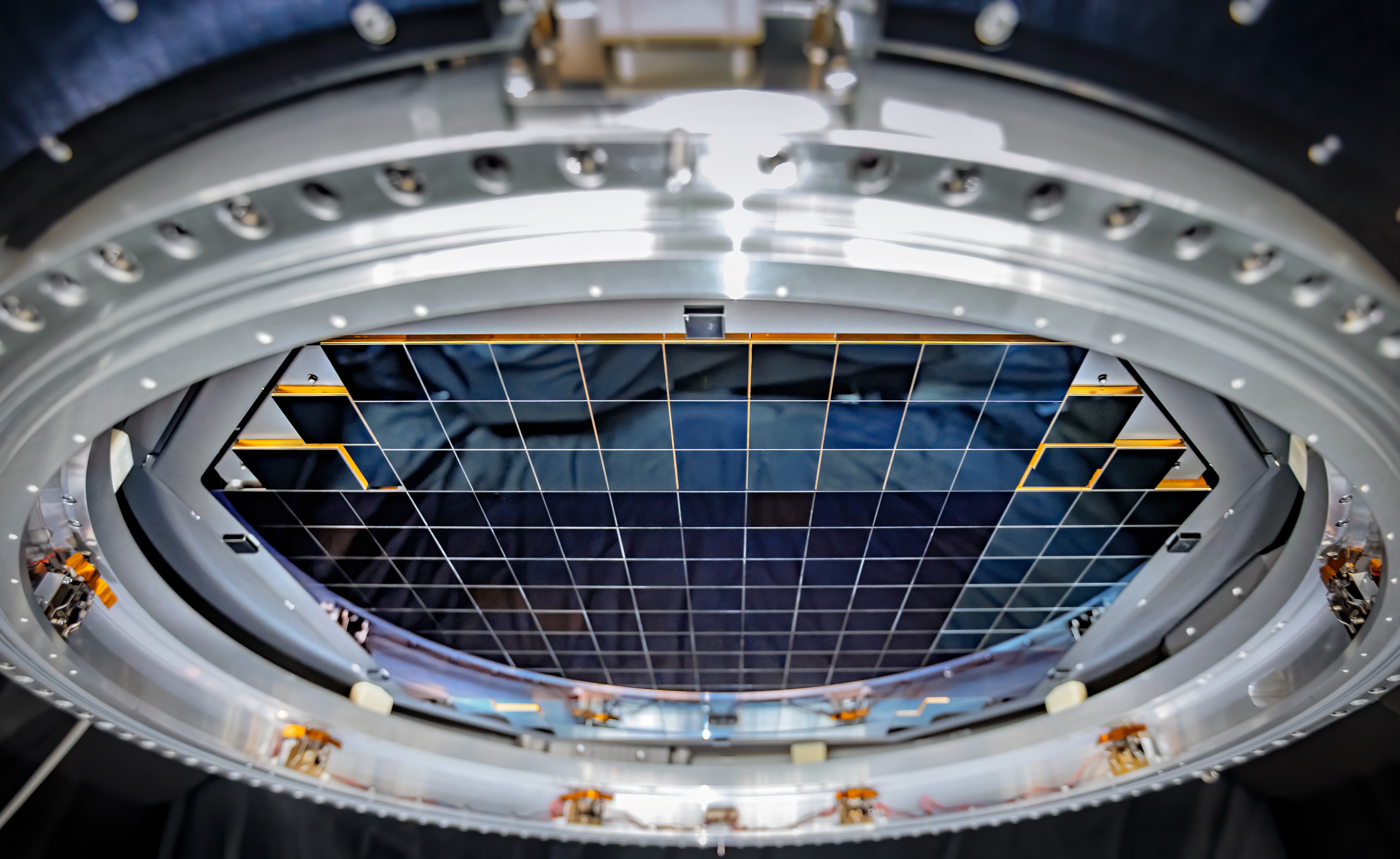
Focal plane of Cam – 60 cm (2 ft) wide, with 189 sensors to produce 3200-megapixel images

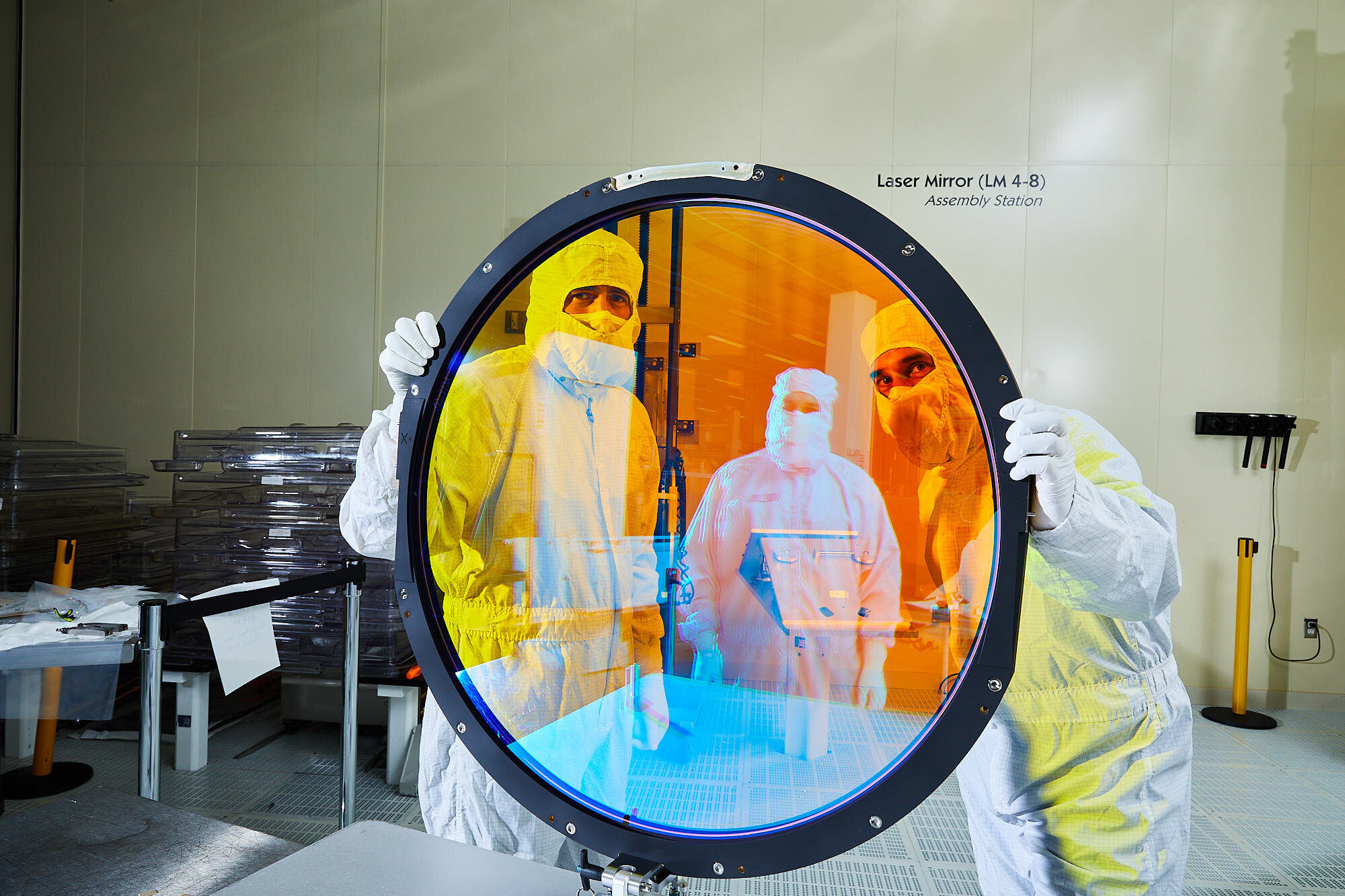
Optical engineers Justin Wolfe (left) and Simon Cohen with the r filter

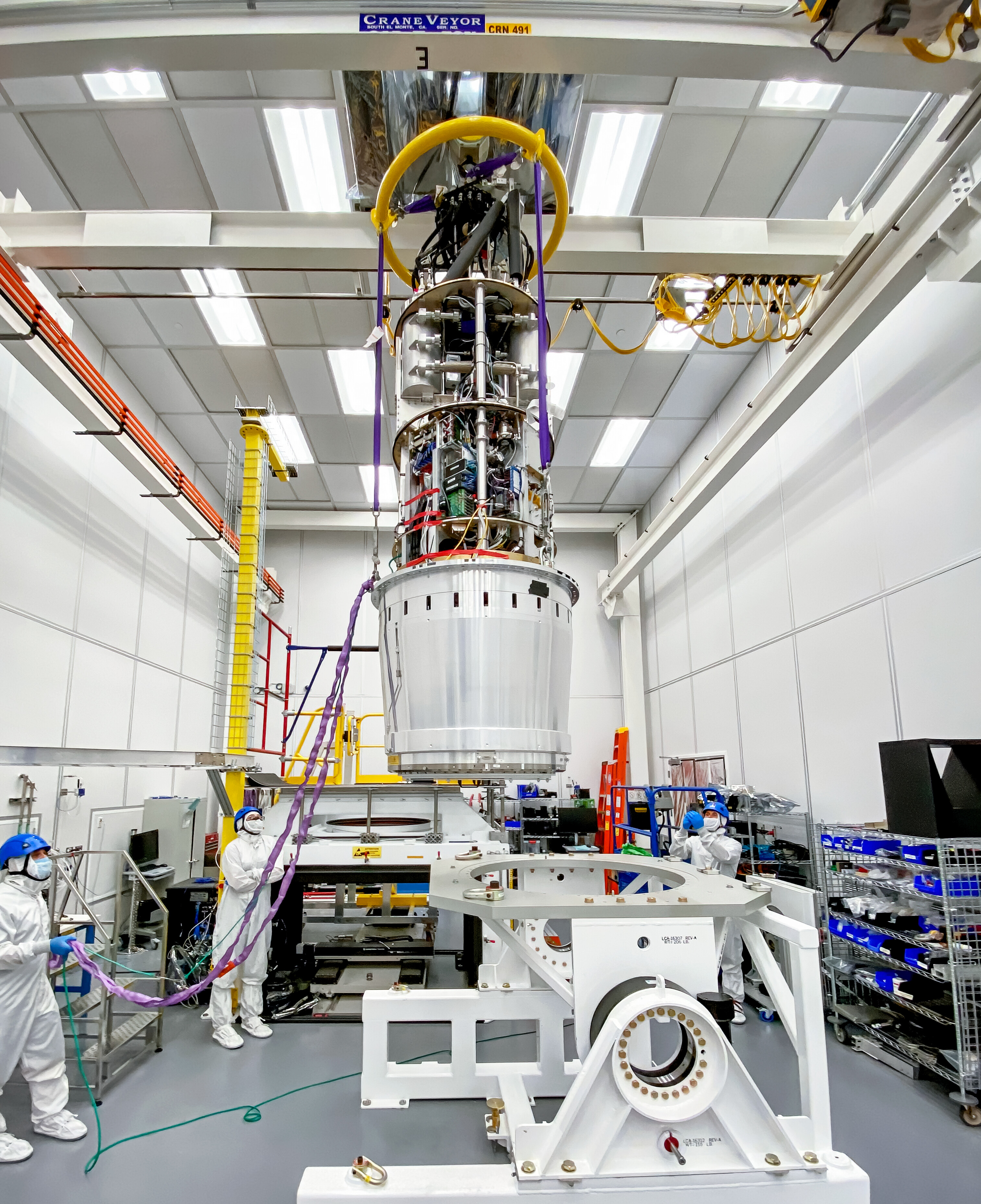
Cam chilled to subzero temperatures

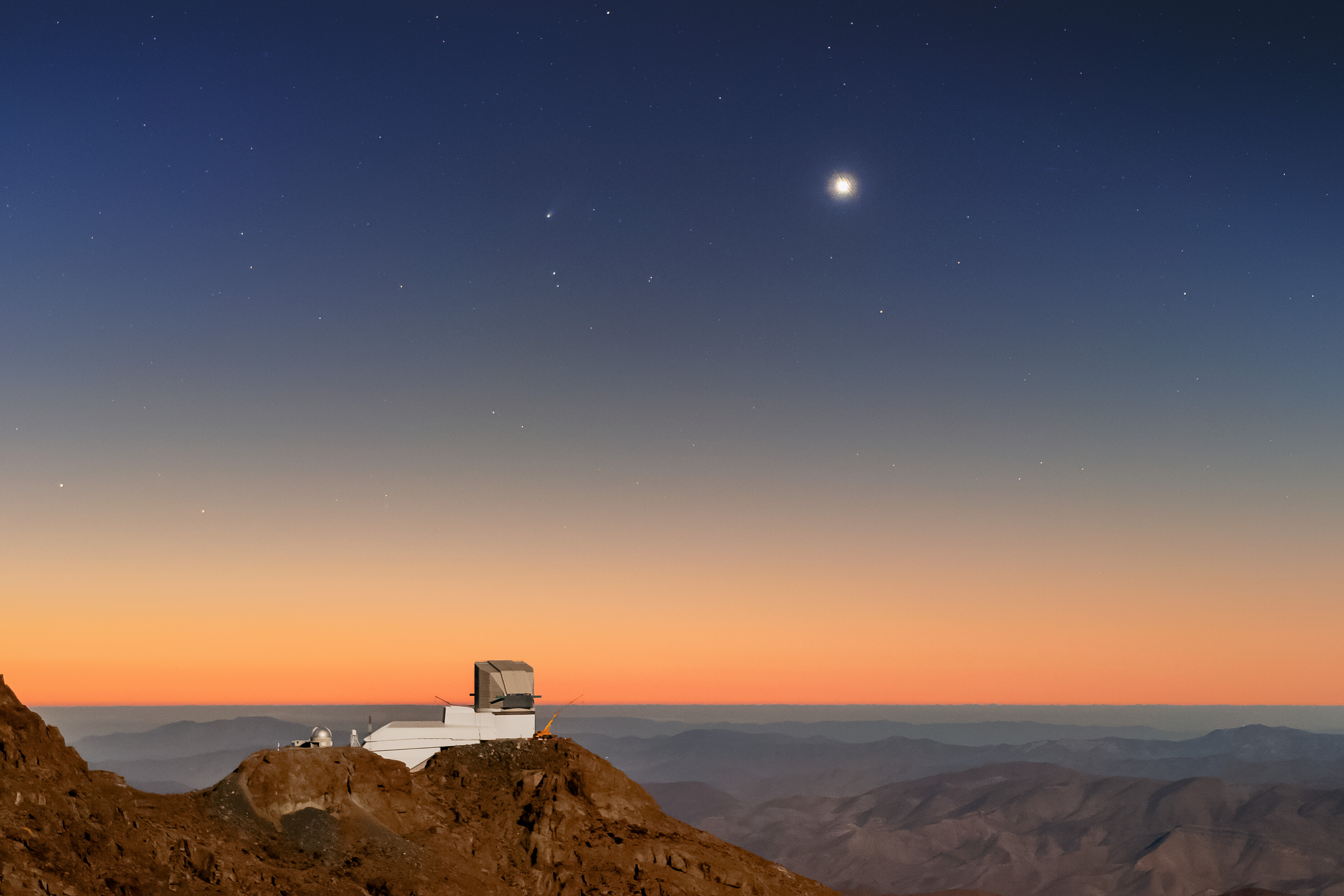
Comet Leonard, the Observatory, the planet Venus, and various stars

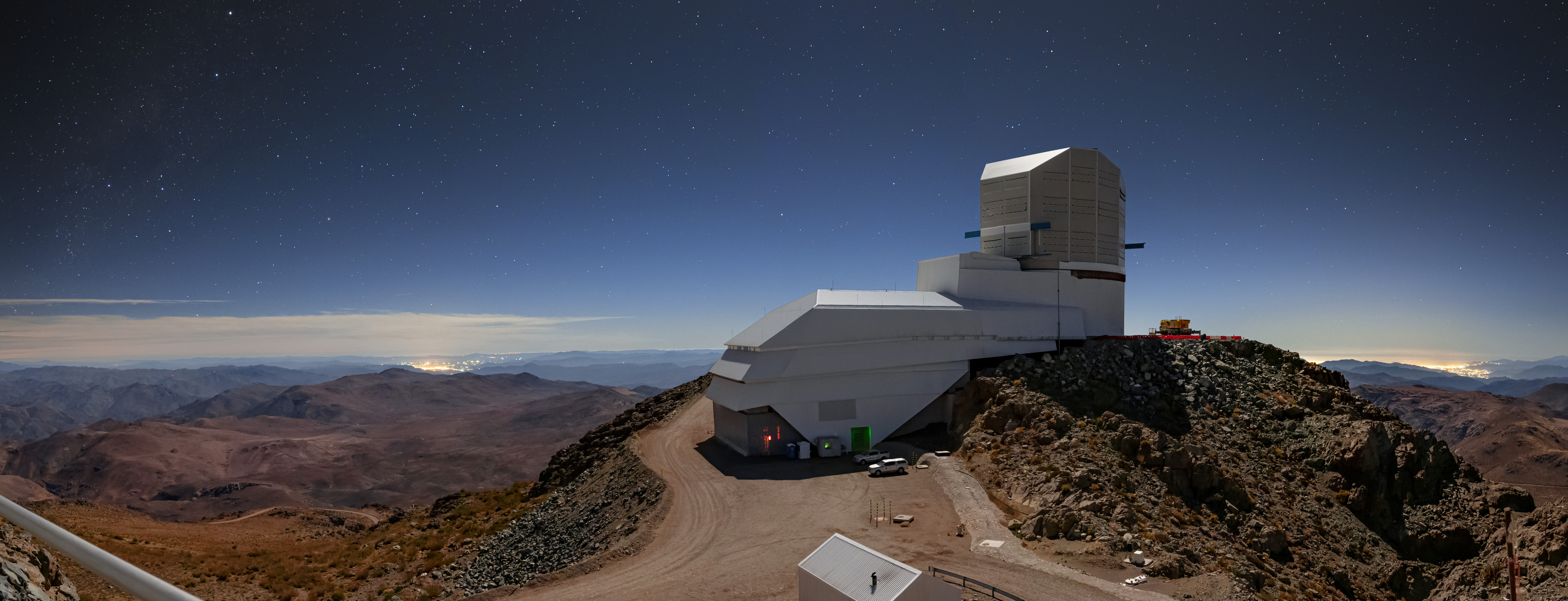
Night light with sky brightening due to the artificial light that can be seen as clusters of bright lights on the horizon

From inside the observatory at night, during commissioning

=== Operations ===
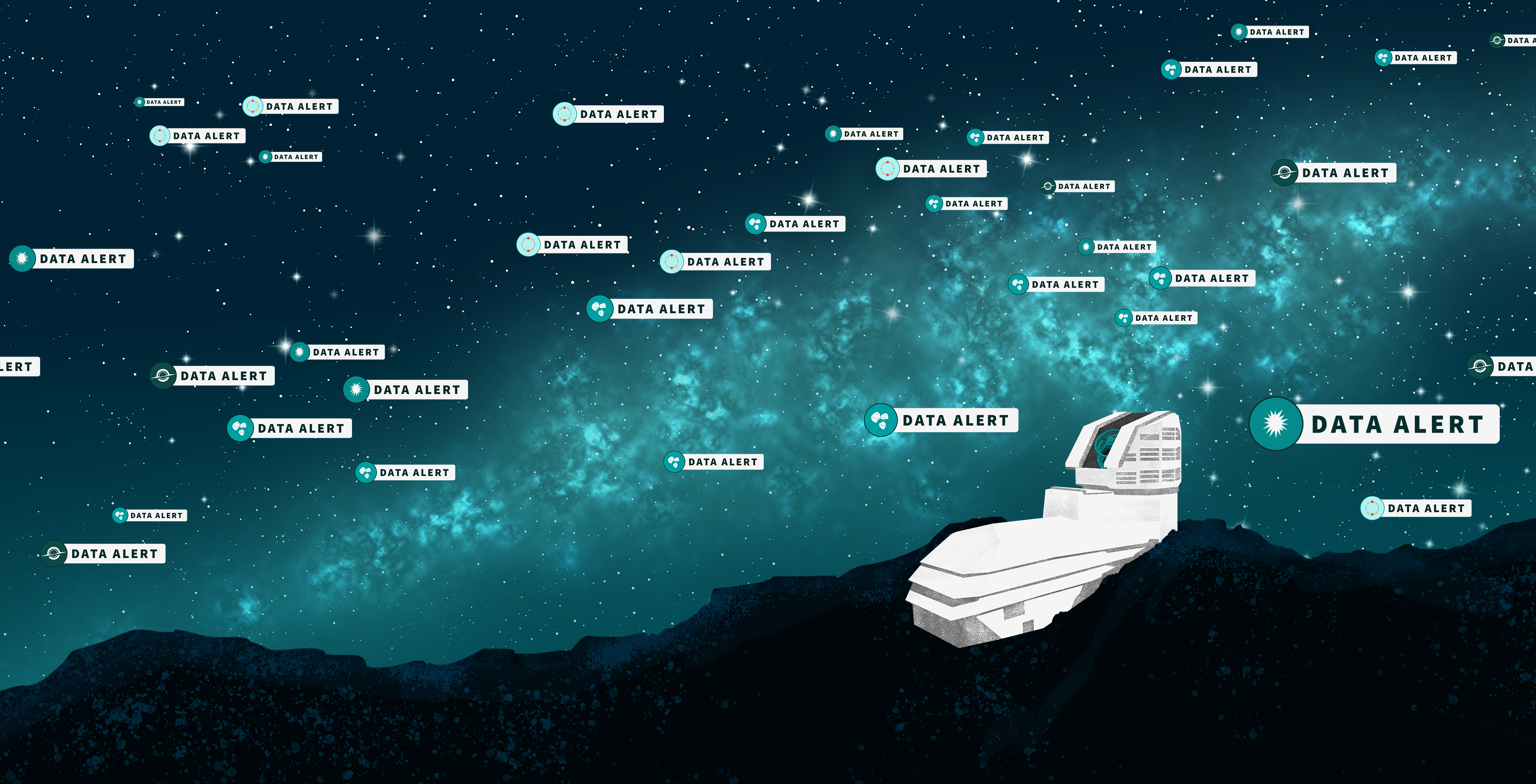
Artist's illustration of the Rubin Observatory alert stream, launched on 24 February 2026. Icons represent individual alert types, including asteroids, supernovae, active galactic nuclei, and variable stars.

== See also ==
- List of largest optical reflecting telescopes
- VISTA (Visible and Infrared Survey Telescope for Astronomy)
- VLT Survey Telescope
