= Harriet Kung =

American Physicist

Harriet Kung is an American physicist and the deputy director for Science Programs for the Office of Science of the U.S. Department of Energy.

== Education and career ==
Kung received her Ph.D. in Materials Science and Engineering from Cornell University. She began her scientific career as a research fellow at the University of Michigan, before joining the technical staff at Los Alamos National Laboratory, where she worked for ten years. She has published 100 refereed papers, mostly in the scientific field of nanomaterials and high-temperature superconductivity. She joined the U.S. DOE in 2002 as a program manager in Materials Science and Engineering, before serving as the associate director of Science for Basic Energy Sciences (BES) from June 2008 to April 2020.

== Awards and honors ==
- Presidential Meritorious Executive Rank Award in 2009.
- DOE Distinguished Postdoctoral Fellowship award
- Performance and leadership service awards at Los Alamos National Laboratory
