= Office of Science =

Agency of the US Department of Energy

Agency overview
- Agency executive: Harriet Kung, Senior Official Performing the Duties of the Director
- Child agency: United States Department of Energy
- Website: www.energy.gov/science/office-science

The Office of Science is a component of the United States Department of Energy (DOE). The Office of Science is the lead federal agency supporting fundamental scientific research for energy and the Nation's largest supporter of basic research in the physical sciences. Its portfolio has two principal thrusts: supporting scientific research and developing, constructing, and operating unique, open-access scientific user facilities available to external researchers.

The Office of Science manages this research portfolio through six interdisciplinary scientific program offices: Advanced Scientific Computing Research, Basic Energy Sciences, Biological and Environmental Research, Fusion Energy Sciences, High Energy Physics and Nuclear Physics. The Office of Science also has responsibility for 10 of the 17 United States Department of Energy National Laboratories.

The office is the predominant U.S. federal government sponsor for research in the physical sciences, including physics, chemistry, computer science, applied mathematics, materials science, nanoscience, and engineering, as well as systems biology and environmental sciences. The Office of Science makes extensive use of peer review and federal advisory committees to develop general directions for research investments, to identify priorities, and to determine the very best scientific proposals to support.

The 10 Office of Science national laboratories are: Ames Laboratory, Argonne National Laboratory, Brookhaven National Laboratory, Fermi National Accelerator Laboratory, Lawrence Berkeley National Laboratory, Oak Ridge National Laboratory, Pacific Northwest National Laboratory, Princeton Plasma Physics Laboratory, SLAC National Accelerator Laboratory, and the Thomas Jefferson National Accelerator Facility.

The Office is currently led by Dr. Harriet Kung, Deputy Director for Science Programs and Senior Official Performing the Duties of the Director.

== Program offices ==
The Office of Science includes six interdisciplinary science program offices:

- Advanced Scientific Computing Research
- Basic Energy Sciences
- Biological and Environmental Research
- Fusion Energy Sciences
- High Energy Physics
- Nuclear Physics.

=== Advanced Scientific Computing Research ===
The Office of Advanced Scientific Computing Research (ASCR) supports research and development in applied mathematics, computer science, and integrated network environments. The programs it supports represent the largest and most active computer science research effort within the U.S. federal government. Supercomputer facilities supported by ASCR include the National Energy Research Scientific Computing Center (NERSC) at Lawrence Berkeley National Laboratory in California, and the Leadership Computing Facility at Oak Ridge National Laboratory in Tennessee and Argonne National Laboratory in Illinois. The ASCR supports the Energy Sciences Network (ESnet), which interconnects more than 40 DOE sites at speeds up to 100 gigabits per second.

ESnet is a successor to a network that the Office of Science created in 1974 to connect geographically dispersed researchers through a single network. In the 1980s the Office of Science collaborated with DARPA, NSF and NASA to convert the agencies' separate networks into a single integrated communications network that became the basis for the commercial Internet.

=== Biological and Environmental Research ===
The Office of Biological and Environmental Research (BER) supports research and scientific user facilities in the biological and environmental sciences to support DOE's missions in energy, environment, and basic research. BER initiated the Human Genome Project in 1986 and has continued to support activity in genomics-based systems biology and initiatives related to biotechnology applications. The Joint Genome Institute, formed in 1997, initially conducted sequencing of human DNA in support of the Human Genome Project. Its current focus is on sequencing the genomes of microbes, microbial communities, fungi, plants, and other organisms.

Environmental efforts include research on the global carbon cycle and possible mitigation of the impacts of climate change. When it started in 1978, BER's Climate Change Research Program was the first U.S. research program to investigate the effects of greenhouse gases on climate and environment. The Office of Science climate change research program is now the third largest in the U.S.

=== Fusion Energy Sciences ===
The Fusion Energy Sciences (FES) organization supports efforts to expand the fundamental understanding of plasma physics and the knowledge needed to develop a fusion energy source. This organization supports U.S. participation in the ITER project through the U.S. ITER Project Office, a partnership of Oak Ridge National Laboratory and Princeton Plasma Physics Laboratory.

== Research funding ==
More than 90 percent of the Office of Science budget is allocated to research and scientific facilities. The fundamental research areas in which the Office of Science has programs include physics and other basic energy sciences, biological and environmental sciences, and computational science. Support is provided for research activities in the national laboratories and universities. The office is the principal (or the single largest) source of U.S. federal government support for research in high-energy physics, nuclear physics, fusion energy, materials science, and chemical sciences. The Office of Science is estimated to provide 40 percent of the funding for basic research in the physical sciences in the United States. It is also a major source of funding for government-supported research in climate change, geophysics, genomics, life sciences, and science education.

In constant dollars, Office of Science annual budgets for Basic Energy Science and Advanced Scientific Computing nearly doubled between fiscal years 1996 and 2009. Budgets for High Energy Physics and Biological and Energy Research remained relatively constant through that 14-year period. Nuclear Physics and Fusion Energy Sciences budgets were relatively static through most of the period, but had substantial increases in fiscal 2009. The increase in the Fusion budget reinstated the U.S. contribution to ITER, which was reduced significantly in the previous year.

== History ==
DOE's Office of Energy Research was a predecessor to the Office of Science.

In 2006, the Office of Science was placed under the oversight of the Under Secretary of Energy for Science, a new position created by the Energy Policy Act of 2005.

=== Accomplishments and awards ===
DOE lists 76 Nobel Prize winners as having been associated with Office of Science programs or facilities under DOE and its predecessor agencies.

== Organization ==
The Office of Science is led by a Presidentially-nominated, Senate-confirmed Director and two senior career federal Deputy Directors.

The Director role is currently vacant. The current deputy directors are Deputy Director for Science Programs Dr. Harriet Kung and Deputy Director for Field Operations Juston Fontaine. Both are a longtime Energy Department managers.

== See also ==
- Office of Scientific and Technical Information
