= Computer (occupation) =

Person performing mathematical calculations, before electronic calculators

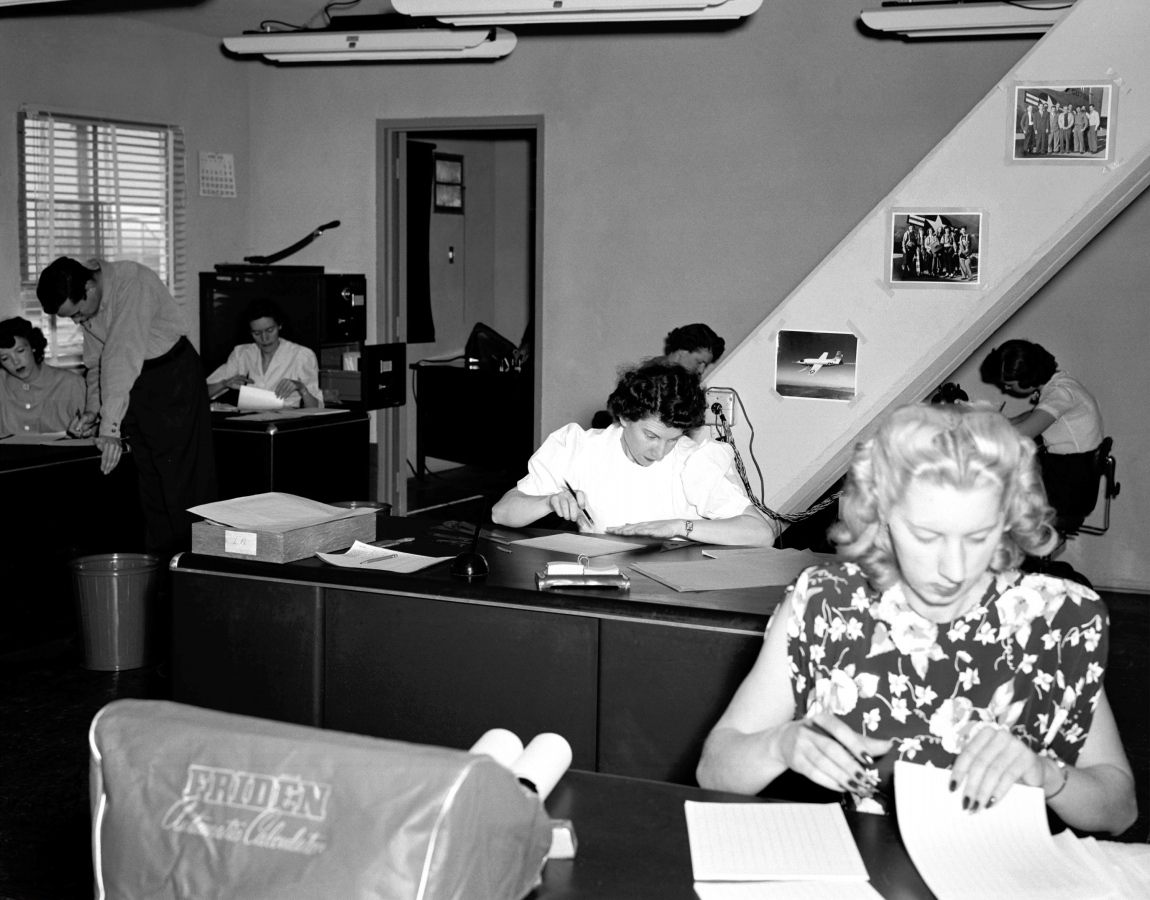
NACA High Speed Flight Station Computer Room (1949)

The term "computer", in use from the early 17th century (the first known written reference dates from 1613), meant "one who computes": a person performing mathematical calculations, before electronic calculators became available. Alan Turing described the "human computer" as someone who is "supposed to be following fixed rules; he has no authority to deviate from them in any detail." Teams of people, often women from the late nineteenth century onwards, were used to undertake long and often tedious calculations; the work was divided so that this could be done in parallel. The same calculations were frequently performed independently by separate teams to check the correctness of the results.

Since the end of the 20th century, the term "human computer" has also been applied to individuals with prodigious powers of mental arithmetic, also known as mental calculators.

== Origins in sciences ==
Astronomers in Renaissance times used that term about as often as they called themselves "mathematicians" for their principal work of calculating the positions of planets. They often hired a "computer" to assist them. For some people, such as Johannes Kepler, assisting a scientist in computation was a temporary position until they moved on to greater advancements. Before he died in 1617, John Napier suggested ways by which "the learned, who perchance may have plenty of pupils and computers" might construct an improved logarithm table.

Computing became more organized when the Frenchman Alexis Claude Clairaut (1713–1765) divided the computation to determine the time of the return of Halley's Comet with two colleagues, Jérôme Lalande and Nicole-Reine Lepaute. Human computers continued plotting the future movements of astronomical objects to create celestial tables for almanacs in the late 1760s.

The computers working on the Nautical Almanac for the British Admiralty included William Wales, Israel Lyons and Richard Dunthorne. The project was overseen by Nevil Maskelyne. Maskelyne would borrow tables from other sources as often as he could in order to reduce the number of calculations his team of computers had to make. Women were generally excluded, with some exceptions, such as Mary Edwards, who worked from the 1780s to 1815 as one of thirty-five computers for the British Nautical Almanac used for navigation at sea. The United States also worked on their own version of a nautical almanac in the 1840s, with Maria Mitchell being one of the best-known computers on the staff.

Other innovations in human computing included the work done by a group of boys who worked in the Octagon Room of the Royal Greenwich Observatory for Astronomer Royal George Airy. Airy's computers, hired after 1835, could be as young as fifteen, and they were working on a backlog of astronomical data. The way that Airy organized the Octagon Room with a manager, pre-printed computing forms, and standardized methods of calculating and checking results (similar to the way the Nautical Almanac computers operated) would remain a standard for computing operations for the next 80 years.

Women were increasingly involved in computing after 1865. Private companies hired them for computing and to manage office staff.

In the 1870s, the United States Signal Corps created a new way of organizing human computing to track weather patterns. This built on previous work from the US Navy and the Smithsonian meteorological project. The Signal Corps used a small computing staff that processed data that had to be collected quickly and finished in "intensive two-hour shifts". Each individual human computer was responsible for only part of the data.

In the late nineteenth century Edward Charles Pickering organized the "Harvard Computers". The first woman to approach them, Anna Winlock, asked Harvard Observatory for a computing job in 1875. By 1880, all of the computers working at the Harvard Observatory were women. The standard computer pay started at twenty-five cents an hour. There would be such a huge demand to work there, that some women offered to work for the Harvard Computers for free. Many of the women astronomers from this era were computers with possibly the best-known being Florence Cushman, Henrietta Swan Leavitt, and Annie Jump Cannon, who worked with Pickering from 1888, 1893, and 1896 respectively. Cannon could classify stars at a rate of three per minute. Mina Fleming, one of the Harvard Computers, published The Draper Catalogue of Stellar Spectra in 1890. The catalogue organized stars by spectral lines. The catalogue continued to be expanded by the Harvard Computers and added new stars in successive volumes. Elizabeth Williams was involved in calculations in the search for a new planet, Pluto, at the Lowell Observatory.

In 1893, Francis Galton created the Committee for Conducting Statistical Inquiries into the Measurable Characteristics of Plants and Animals which reported to the Royal Society. The committee used advanced techniques for scientific research and supported the work of several scientists. W.F. Raphael Weldon, the first scientist supported by the committee worked with his wife, Florence Tebb Weldon, who was his computer. Weldon used logarithms and mathematical tables created by August Leopold Crelle and had no calculating machine. Karl Pearson, who had a lab at the University of London, felt that the work Weldon did was "hampered by the committee". However, Pearson did create a mathematical formula that the committee was able to use for data correlation. Pearson brought his correlation formula to his own Biometrics Laboratory. Pearson had volunteer and salaried computers who were both men and women. Alice Lee was one of his salaried computers who worked with histograms and the chi-squared statistics. Pearson also worked with Beatrice and Frances Cave-Brown-Cave. Pearson's lab, by 1906, had mastered the art of mathematical table making.

== Mathematical tables ==
Human computers were used to compile 18th and 19th century Western European mathematical tables, for example those for trigonometry and logarithms. Although these tables were most often known by the names of the principal mathematician involved in the project, such tables were often in fact the work of an army of unknown and unsung computers. Ever more accurate tables to a high degree of precision were needed for navigation and engineering. Approaches differed, but one was to break up the project into a form of piece work completed at home. The computers, often educated middle-class women whom society deemed it unseemly to engage in the professions or go out to work, would receive and send back packets of calculations by post. The Royal Astronomical Society eventually gave space to a new committee, the Mathematical Tables Committee, which was the only professional organization for human computers in 1925.

== Fluid dynamics ==
Human computers were used to predict the effects of building the Afsluitdijk between 1927 and 1932 in the Zuiderzee in the Netherlands. The computer simulation was set up by Hendrik Lorentz.

A visionary application to meteorology can be found in the scientific work of Lewis Fry Richardson who, in 1922, estimated that 64,000 humans could forecast the weather for the whole globe by solving the attending differential primitive equations numerically. Around 1910 he had already used human computers to calculate the stresses inside a masonry dam.

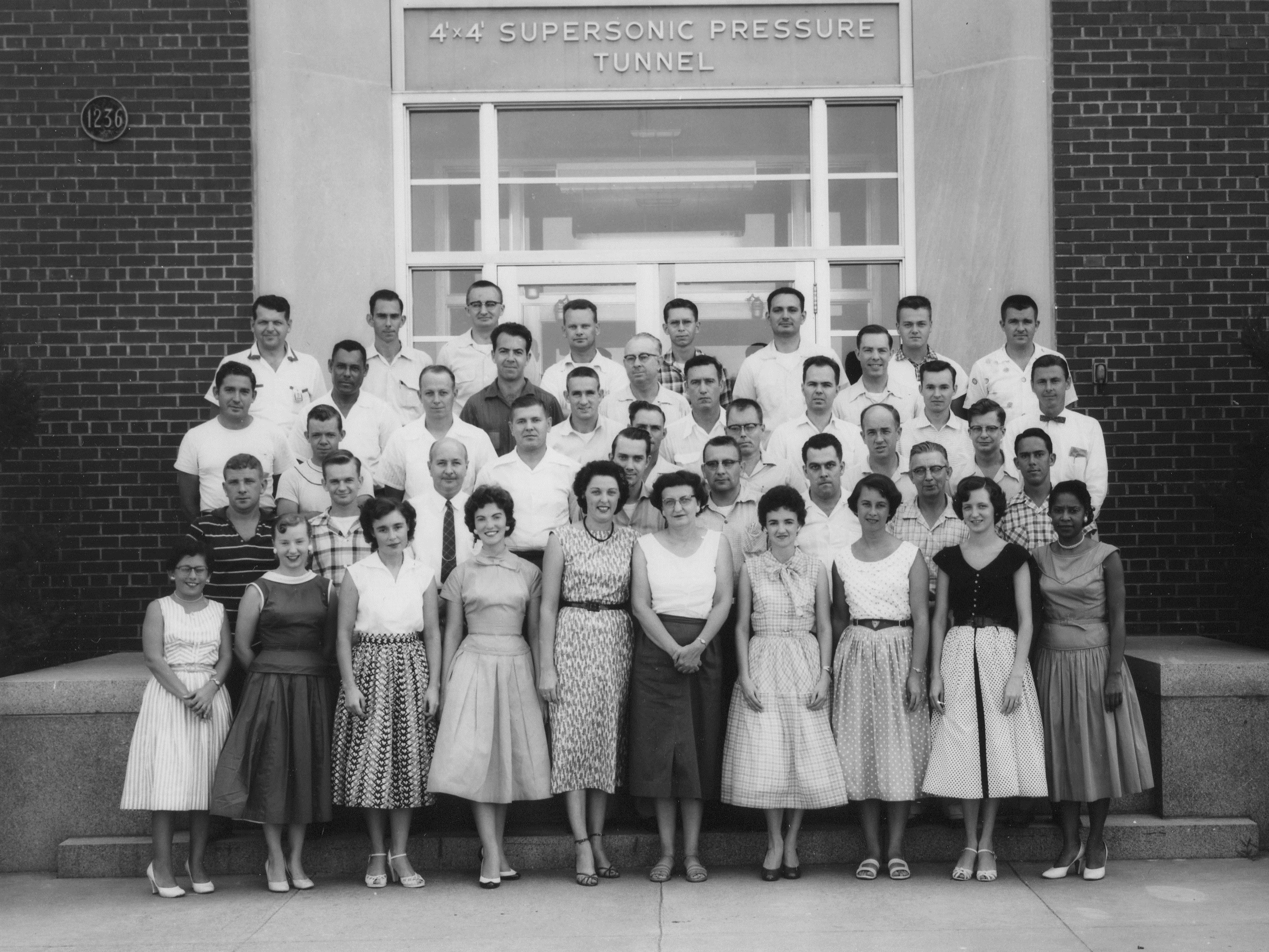
NACA human computers – Supersonic Pressure Tunnel staff in 1950s

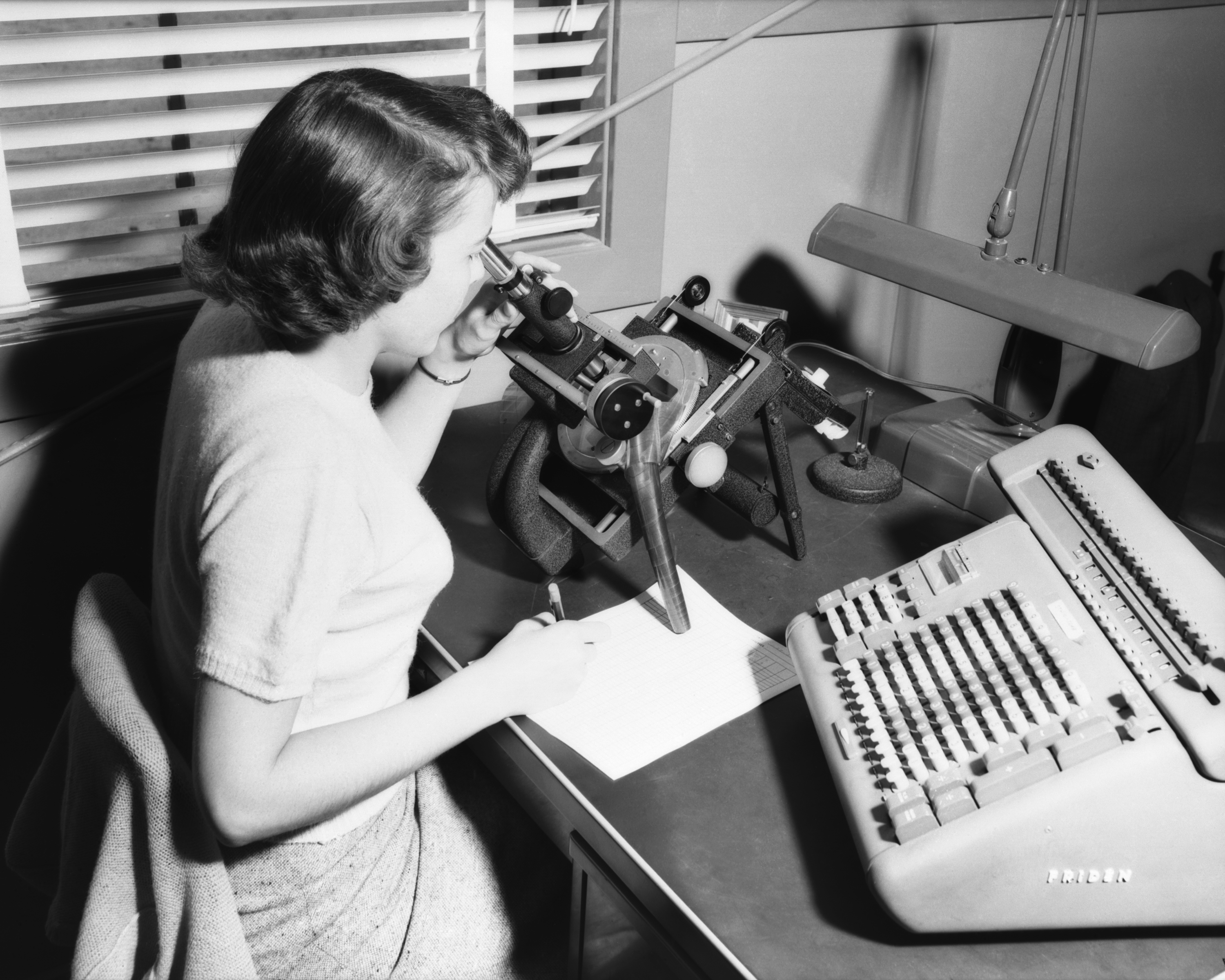
1952, NACA computer working with microscope and calculator

== Wartime computing and electronics ==
It was not until World War I that computing became a profession. "The First World War required large numbers of human computers. Computers on both sides of the war produced map grids, surveying aids, navigation tables and artillery tables. With the men at war, most of these new computers were women and many were college educated." This would happen again during World War II; as more men joined the fight, college educated women were left to fill their positions. One of the first female computers, Elizabeth Webb Wilson, was hired by the Army in 1918 and was a graduate of George Washington University. Wilson "patiently sought a war job that would make use of her mathematical skill. In later years, she would claim that the war spared her from the 'Washington social whirl', the rounds of society events that should have procured for her a husband" and instead she was able to have a career. After the war, Wilson continued with a career in mathematics and became an actuary and turned her focus to life tables.

Human computers played integral roles in the World War II war effort in the United States, and because of the depletion of the male labor force due to the draft, many computers during World War II were women, frequently with degrees in mathematics. In the 1940s, women were hired to examine nuclear and particle tracks left on photographic emulsions. In the Manhattan Project, human computers working with a variety of mechanical aids assisted numerical studies of the complex formulas related to nuclear fission.

Human computers were involved in calculating ballistics tables during World War I. Between the two world wars, computers were used in the Department of Agriculture in the United States and also at Iowa State College. The human computers in these places also used calculating machines and early electrical computers to aid in their work. In the 1930s, The Columbia University Statistical Bureau was created by Benjamin Wood. Organized computing was also established at Indiana University, the Cowles Commission and the National Research Council.

Following World War II, the National Advisory Committee for Aeronautics (NACA) used human computers in flight research to transcribe raw data from celluloid film and oscillograph paper and then, using slide rules and electric calculators, reduced the data to standard engineering units. Margot Lee Shetterly's biographical book, Hidden Figures (made into a movie of the same name in 2016), depicts African-American women who served as human computers at NASA in support of the Friendship 7, the first American crewed mission into Earth orbit. NACA had begun hiring black women as computers from 1940. One such computer was Dorothy Vaughan who began her work in 1943 with the Langley Research Center as a special hire to aid the war effort, and who came to supervise the West Area Computers, a group of African-American women who worked as computers at Langley. Human computing was, at the time, considered menial work. On November 8, 2019, the Congressional Gold Medal was awarded "In recognition of all the women who served as computers, mathematicians, and engineers at the National Advisory Committee for Aeronautics and the National Aeronautics and Space Administration (NASA) between the 1930s and the 1970s."

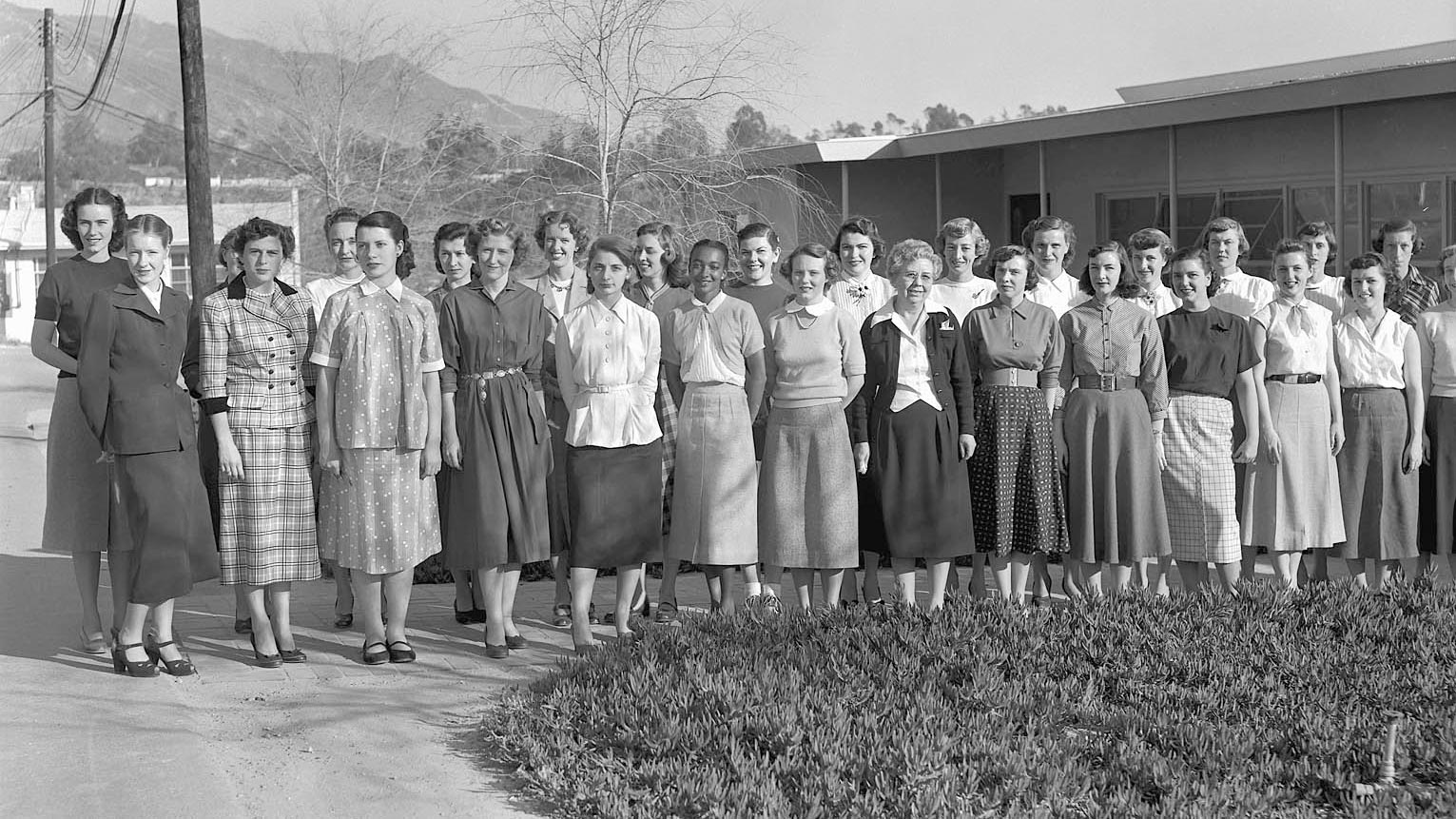
Computers for the Explorer 1 trajectory.

As electrical computers became more available, human computers, especially women, were drafted as some of the first computer programmers. Because the six people responsible for setting up problems on the ENIAC (the first general-purpose electronic digital computer built at the University of Pennsylvania during World War II) were drafted from a corps of human computers, the world's first professional computer programmers were women, namely: Kay McNulty, Betty Snyder, Marlyn Wescoff, Ruth Lichterman, Betty Jean Jennings, and Fran Bilas.

== Human-assisted computation ==
The term "human computer" has been recently used by a group of researchers who refer to their work as "human computation". In this usage, "human computer" refers to activities of humans in the context of human-based computation (HBC).

This use of "human computer" is debatable for the following reason: HBC is a computational technique where a machine outsources certain parts of a task to humans to perform, which are not necessarily algorithmic. In fact, in the context of HBC most of the time humans are not provided with a sequence of exact steps to be executed to yield the desired result; HBC is agnostic about how humans solve the problem. This is why "outsourcing" is the term used in the definition above. The use of humans in the historical role of "human computers" for HBC is very rare.

== See also ==
- Difference engine – an early automatic mechanical calculator designed to replace human computers
- List of obsolete occupations
- Mathematical Tables Project – a project of the Works Progress Administration (WPA) that employed human computers
- Mentat – fictional human computers in the Dune universe
- Women in computing
