= Harvard–Smithsonian Center for Astrophysics =

Astronomical observatory in Massachusetts, US

Coordinates: 42.38146°N 71.12837°W

Center for Astrophysics | Harvard & Smithsonian
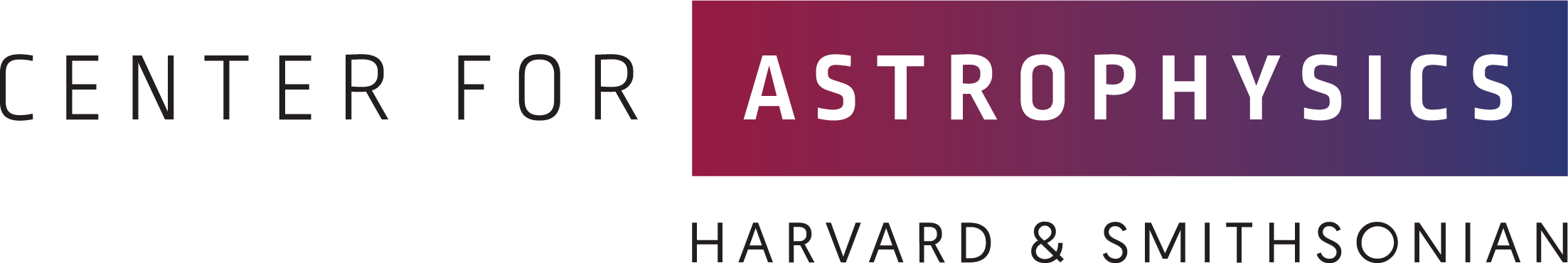

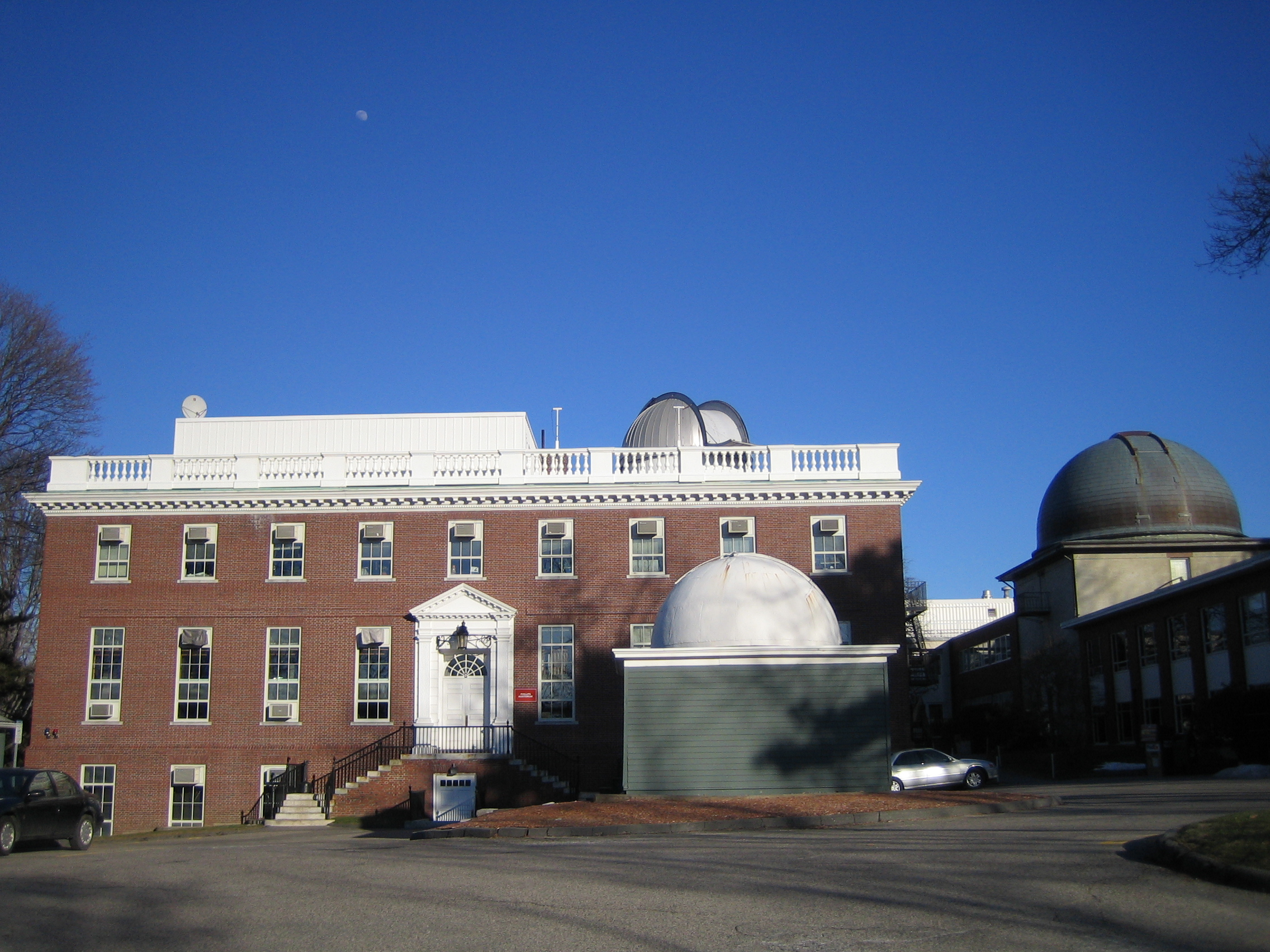
- CfA Headquarters in Cambridge, Massachusetts
- Abbreviation: CfA
- Established: 1973
- Headquarters: 60 Garden Street, Cambridge, Massachusetts, United States
- Director: Lisa Kewley
- Staff: 850+
- Website: www.cfa.harvard.edu
- Formerly called: Harvard-Smithsonian Center for Astrophysics

The Center for Astrophysics | Harvard & Smithsonian (CfA), previously known as the Harvard–Smithsonian Center for Astrophysics, is an astrophysics research institute jointly operated by the Harvard College Observatory and Smithsonian Astrophysical Observatory. Founded in 1973 and headquartered in Cambridge, Massachusetts, United States, the CfA leads a broad program of research in astronomy, astrophysics, Earth and space sciences, as well as science education. The CfA either leads or participates in the development and operations of more than fifteen ground- and space-based astronomical research observatories across the electromagnetic spectrum, including the forthcoming Giant Magellan Telescope (GMT) and the Chandra X-ray Observatory, one of NASA's Great Observatories.

Hosting more than 850 scientists, engineers, and support staff, the CfA is among the largest astronomical research institutes in the world. Its projects have included Nobel Prize-winning advances in cosmology and high energy astrophysics, the discovery of many exoplanets, and the first image of a black hole. The CfA also serves a major role in the global astrophysics research community: the CfA's Astrophysics Data System (ADS), for example, has been universally adopted as the world's online database of astronomy and physics papers. Known for most of its history as the "Harvard-Smithsonian Center for Astrophysics", the CfA rebranded in 2018 to its current name in an effort to reflect its unique status as a joint collaboration between Harvard University and the Smithsonian Institution. Lisa Kewley has served as the director of the CfA since 2022.

== History of the CfA ==
The Center for Astrophysics | Harvard & Smithsonian is not formally an independent legal organization, but rather an institutional entity operated under a memorandum of understanding between Harvard University and the Smithsonian Institution. This collaboration was formalized on July 1, 1973, with the goal of coordinating the related research activities of the Harvard College Observatory (HCO) and the Smithsonian Astrophysical Observatory (SAO) under the leadership of a single director, and housed within the same complex of buildings on the Harvard campus in Cambridge, Massachusetts. The CfA's history is therefore also that of the two fully independent organizations that comprise it. With a combined history of more than 300 years, HCO and SAO have been host to major milestones in astronomical history that predate the CfA's founding. These are briefly summarized below.

=== History of the Smithsonian Astrophysical Observatory (SAO) ===
Samuel Pierpont Langley, the third Secretary of the Smithsonian, founded the Smithsonian Astrophysical Observatory on the south yard of the Smithsonian Castle (on the U.S. National Mall) on March 1, 1890. The Astrophysical Observatory's initial, primary purpose was to "record the amount and character of the Sun's heat". Charles Greeley Abbot was named SAO's first director, and the observatory operated solar telescopes to take daily measurements of the Sun's intensity in different regions of the optical electromagnetic spectrum. In doing so, the observatory enabled Abbot to make critical refinements to the Solar constant, as well as to serendipitously discover Solar variability. It is likely that SAO's early history as a solar observatory was part of the inspiration behind the Smithsonian's "sunburst" logo, designed in 1965 by Crimilda Pontes.

In 1955, the scientific headquarters of SAO moved from Washington, D.C. to Cambridge, Massachusetts, to affiliate with the Harvard College Observatory (HCO). Fred Lawrence Whipple, then the chairman of the Harvard Astronomy Department, was named the new director of SAO. The collaborative relationship between SAO and HCO therefore predates the official creation of the CfA by 18 years. SAO's move to Harvard's campus also resulted in a rapid expansion of its research program. Following the launch of Sputnik (the world's first human-made satellite) in 1957, SAO accepted a national challenge to create a worldwide satellite-tracking network, collaborating with the United States Air Force on Project Space Track.

With the creation of NASA the following year and throughout the Space Race, SAO led major efforts in the development of orbiting observatories and large ground-based telescopes, laboratory and theoretical astrophysics, as well as the application of computers to astrophysical problems.

=== History of Harvard College Observatory (HCO) ===
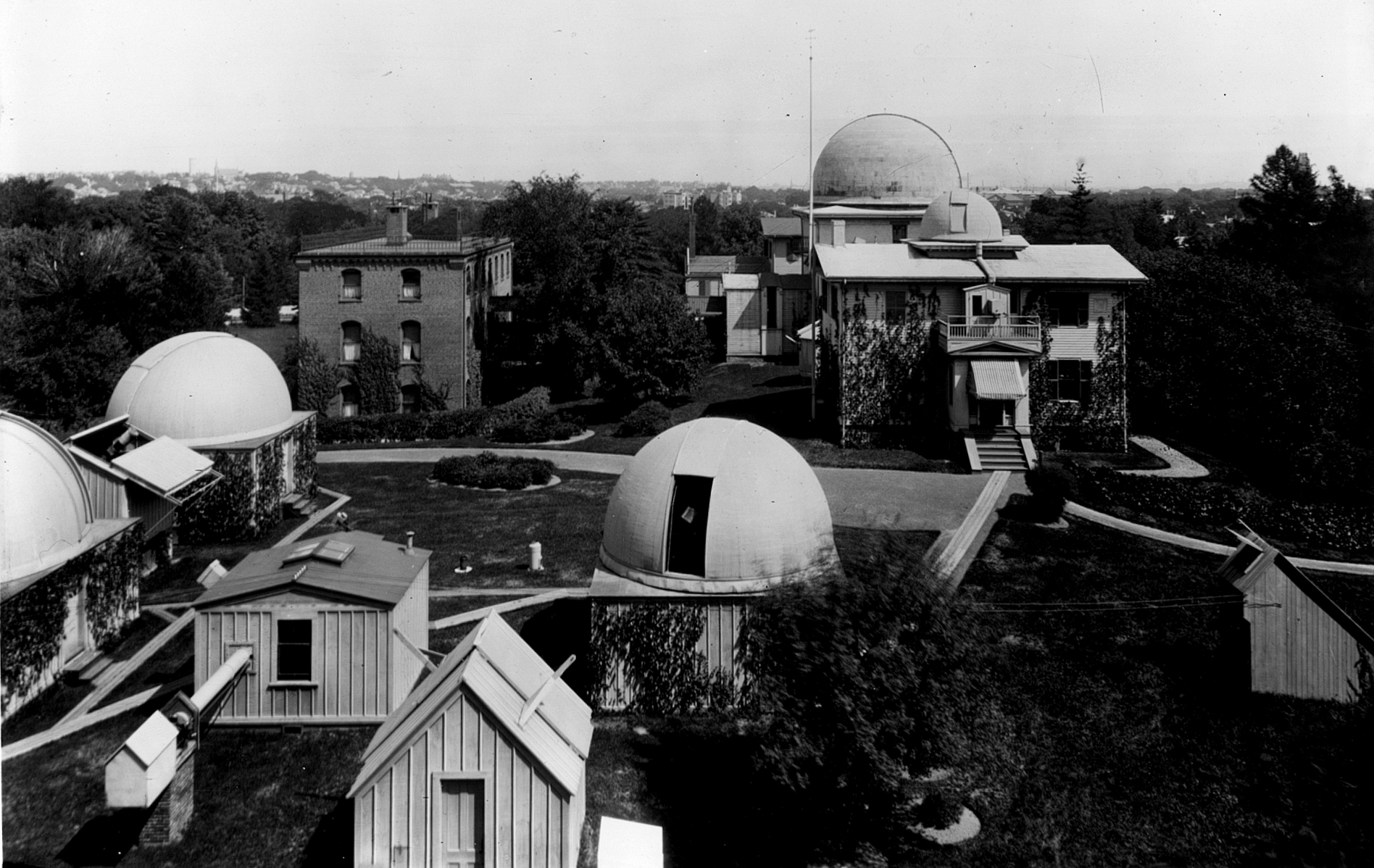
The Harvard College Observatory, circa 1899. Harvard Square and the City of Boston are in the distant background. Most of the telescope domes in the foreground are no longer standing, but the largest dome in the top right of the photo, housing the 1847 "Great Refractor", still remains. The Great Refractor was the largest telescope in the United States until 1867. It was the first telescope to take a photographic image of the Moon.

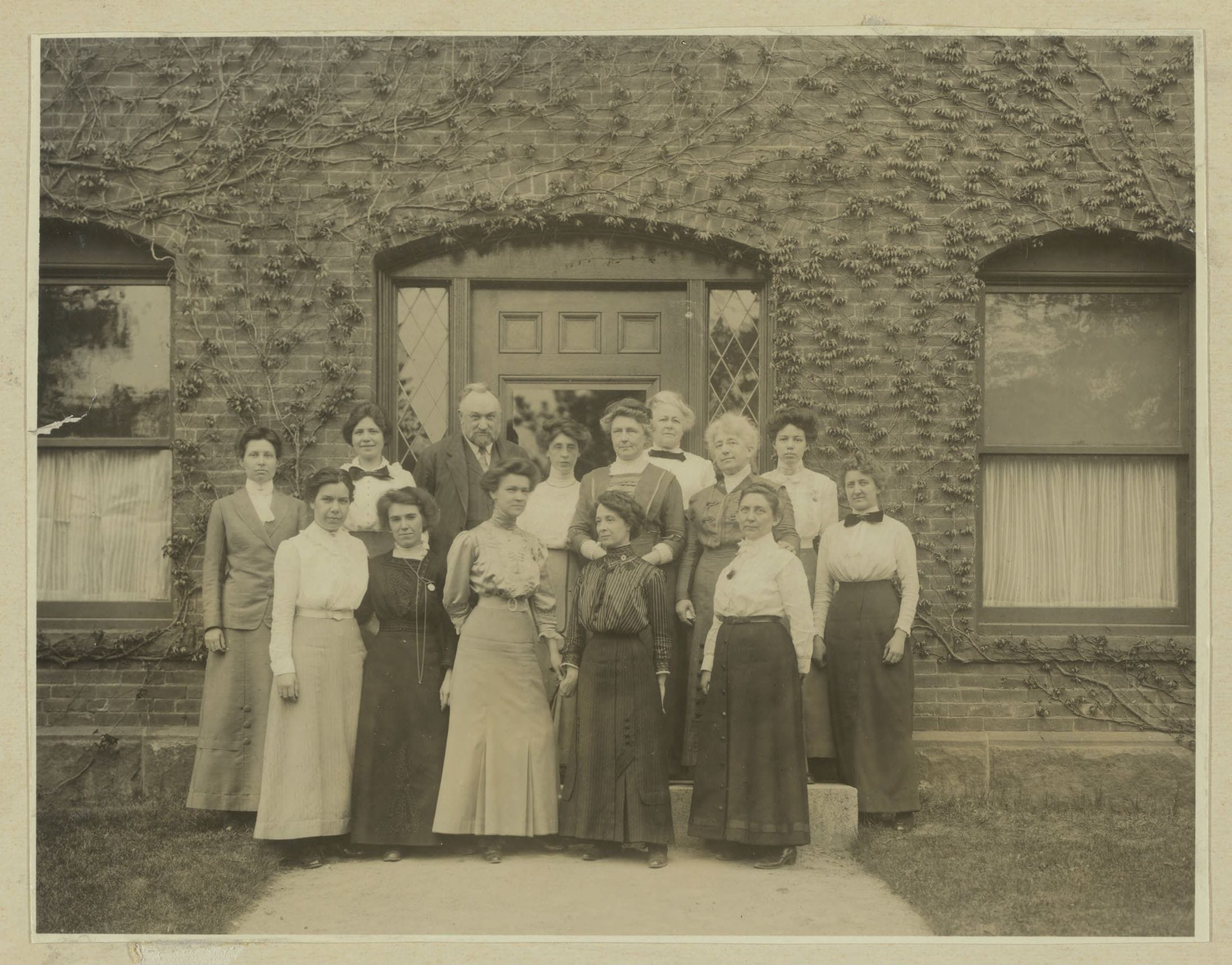
The Harvard College Observatory "Computers" standing in front of Building C at Harvard College Observatory, May 13, 1913. The Center for Astrophysics exists at this same location today. Back row (L to R): Margaret Harwood (far left), Mollie O'Reilly, Edward C. Pickering, Edith Gill, Annie Jump Cannon, Evelyn Leland (behind Cannon), Florence Cushman, Marion Whyte (behind Cushman), Grace Brooks. Front row: Arville Walker, unknown (possibly Johanna Mackie), Alta Carpenter, Mabel Gill, Ida Woods.

Partly in response to renewed public interest in astronomy following the 1835 return of Halley's Comet, the Harvard College Observatory was founded in 1839, when the Harvard Corporation appointed William Cranch Bond as an "Astronomical Observer to the University". For its first four years of operation, the observatory was situated at the Dana-Palmer House (where Bond also resided) near Harvard Yard, and consisted of little more than three small telescopes and an astronomical clock. In his 1840 book recounting the history of the college, then Harvard President Josiah Quincy III noted that "there is wanted a reflecting telescope equatorially mounted". This telescope, the 15-inch "Great Refractor", opened seven years later (in 1847) at the top of Observatory Hill in Cambridge (where it still exists today, housed in the oldest of the CfA's complex of buildings). The telescope was the largest in the United States from 1847 until 1867. William Bond and pioneer photographer John Adams Whipple used the Great Refractor to produce the first clear Daguerrotypes of the Moon (winning them an award at the 1851 Great Exhibition in London). Bond and his son, George Phillips Bond (the second director of HCO), used it to discover Saturn's 8th moon, Hyperion (which was also independently discovered by William Lassell).

Under the directorship of Edward Charles Pickering from 1877 to 1919, the observatory became the world's major producer of stellar spectra and magnitudes, established an observing station in Peru, and applied mass-production methods to the analysis of data. It was during this time that HCO became host to a series of major discoveries in astronomical history, powered by the observatory's so-called "Computers" (women hired by Pickering as skilled workers to process astronomical data). These "Computers" included Williamina Fleming, Annie Jump Cannon, Henrietta Swan Leavitt, Florence Cushman and Antonia Maury, all widely recognized today as major figures in scientific history. Henrietta Swan Leavitt, for example, discovered the so-called period–luminosity relation for Classical Cepheid variable stars, establishing the first major "standard candle" with which to measure the distance to galaxies. Now called "Leavitt's law", the discovery is regarded as one of the most foundational and important in the history of astronomy; astronomers like Edwin Hubble, for example, would later use Leavitt's law to establish that the Universe is expanding, the primary piece of evidence for the Big Bang model.

Upon Pickering's retirement in 1921, the directorship of HCO fell to Harlow Shapley (a major participant in the so-called "Great Debate" of 1920). This era of the observatory was made famous by the work of Cecelia Payne-Gaposchkin, who became the first woman to earn a PhD in astronomy from Radcliffe College (a short walk from the observatory). Payne-Gapochkin's 1925 thesis proposed that stars were composed primarily of hydrogen and helium, an idea thought ridiculous at the time. Between Shapley's tenure and the formation of the CfA, the observatory was directed by Donald H. Menzel and then Leo Goldberg, both of whom maintained widely recognized programs in solar and stellar astrophysics. Menzel played a major role in encouraging the Smithsonian Astrophysical Observatory to move to Cambridge and collaborate more closely with HCO.

=== Joint history as the Center for Astrophysics (CfA) ===
The collaborative foundation for what would ultimately give rise to the Center for Astrophysics began with SAO's move to Cambridge in 1955. Fred Whipple, who was already chair of the Harvard Astronomy Department (housed within HCO since 1931), was named SAO's new director at the start of this new era; an early test of the model for a unified directorship across HCO and SAO. The following 18 years would see the two independent entities merge ever closer together, operating effectively (but informally) as one large research center.

This joint relationship was formalized as the new Harvard–Smithsonian Center for Astrophysics on July 1, 1973. George B. Field, then affiliated with Berkeley, was appointed as its first director. That same year, a new astronomical journal, the CfA Preprint Series was created, and a CfA/SAO instrument flying aboard Skylab discovered coronal holes on the Sun. The founding of the CfA also coincided with the birth of X-ray astronomy as a new, major field that was largely dominated by CfA scientists in its early years. Riccardo Giacconi, regarded as the "father of X-ray astronomy", founded the High Energy Astrophysics Division within the new CfA by moving most of his research group (then at American Sciences and Engineering) to SAO in 1973. That group would later go on to launch the Einstein Observatory (the first imaging X-ray telescope) in 1976, and ultimately lead the proposals and development of what would become the Chandra X-ray Observatory. Chandra, the second of NASA's Great Observatories and still the most powerful X-ray telescope in history, continues operations today as part of the CfA's Chandra X-ray Center. Giacconi would later win the 2002 Nobel Prize in Physics for his foundational work in X-ray astronomy.

Shortly after the launch of the Einstein Observatory, the CfA's Steven Weinberg won the 1979 Nobel Prize in Physics for his work on electroweak unification. The following decade saw the start of the landmark CfA Redshift Survey (the first attempt to map the large scale structure of the Universe), as well as the release of the "Field Report", a highly influential Astronomy and Astrophysics Decadal Survey chaired by the outgoing CfA Director George Field. He would be replaced in 1982 by Irwin Shapiro, who during his tenure as director (1982 to 2004) oversaw the expansion of the CfA's observing facilities around the world, including the newly named Fred Lawrence Whipple Observatory, the Infrared Telescope (IRT) aboard the Space Shuttle, the 6.5-meter Multiple Mirror Telescope (MMT), the SOHO satellite, and the launch of Chandra in 1999. CfA-led discoveries throughout this period include canonical work on Supernova 1987A, the "CfA2 Great Wall" (then the largest known coherent structure in the Universe), the best-yet evidence for supermassive black holes, and the first convincing evidence for an extrasolar planet.

The 1980s also saw the CfA play a distinct role in the history of computer science and the internet: in 1986, SAO started developing SAOImage, one of the world's first X11-based applications made publicly available (its successor, DS9, remains the most widely used astronomical FITS image viewer worldwide). During this time, scientists and software developers at the CfA also began work on what would become the Astrophysics Data System (ADS), one of the world's first online databases of research papers. By 1993, the ADS was running the first routine transatlantic queries between databases, a foundational aspect of the internet today.

== The CfA today ==
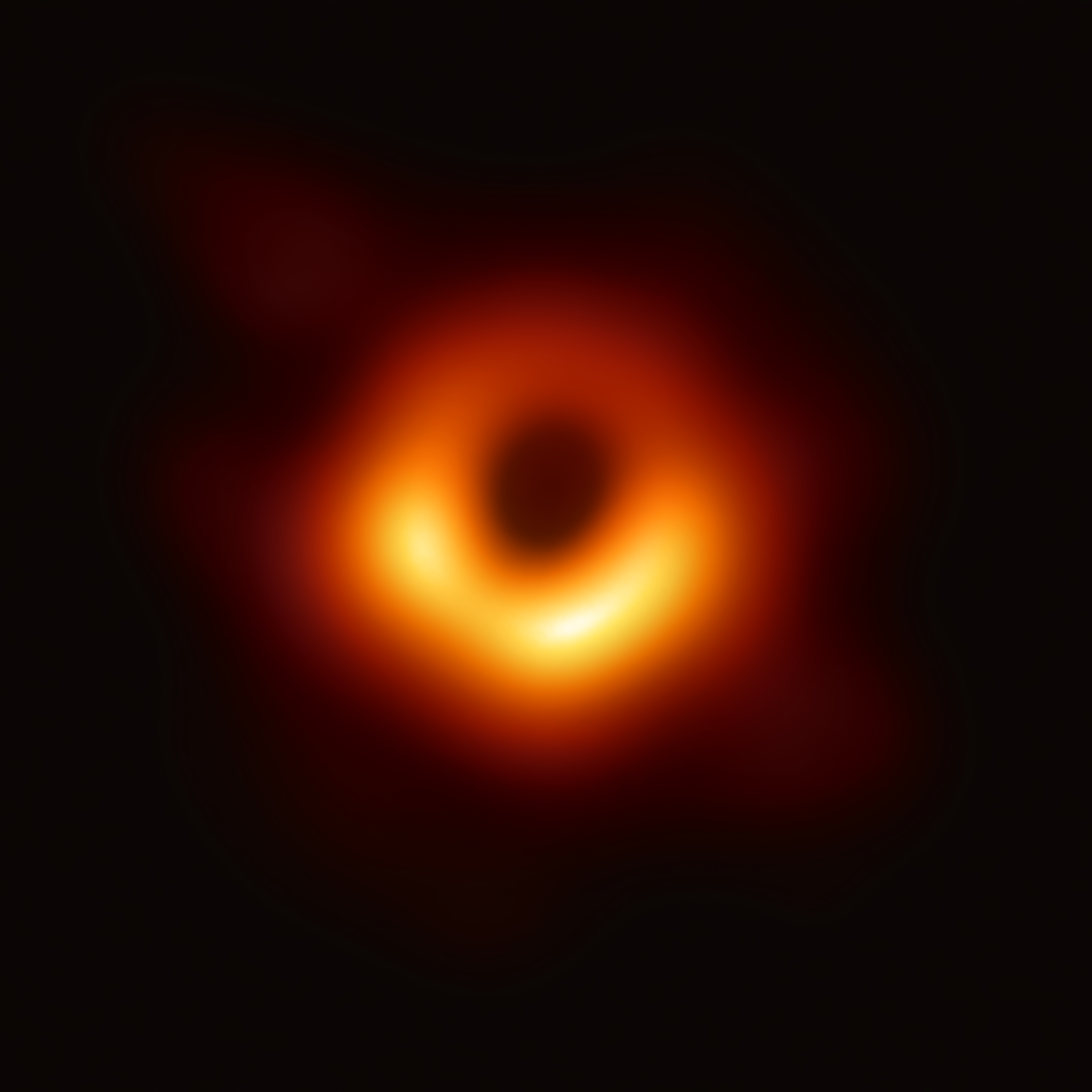
The first image of the photon ring of a black hole (M87*), captured by the Event Horizon Telescope. The CfA plays a central role in the project.

=== Research at the CfA ===
Charles Alcock, known for a number of major works related to massive compact halo objects, was named the third director of the CfA in 2004. Today Alcock oversees one of the largest and most productive astronomical institutes in the world, with more than 850 staff and an annual budget in excess of $100 million. The Harvard Department of Astronomy, housed within the CfA, maintains a continual complement of approximately 60 PhD students, more than 100 postdoctoral researchers, and roughly 25 undergraduate astronomy and astrophysics majors from Harvard College. SAO, meanwhile, hosts a long-running and highly rated REU Summer Intern program as well as many visiting graduate students. The CfA estimates that roughly 10% of the professional astrophysics community in the United States spent at least a portion of their career or education there.

The CfA is either a lead or major partner in the operations of the Fred Lawrence Whipple Observatory, the Submillimeter Array, MMT Observatory, the South Pole Telescope, VERITAS, and a number of other smaller ground-based telescopes. The CfA's 2019–2024 Strategic Plan includes the construction of the Giant Magellan Telescope as a driving priority for the center.

Along with the Chandra X-ray Observatory, the CfA plays a central role in a number of space-based observing facilities, including the recently launched Parker Solar Probe, Kepler space telescope, the Solar Dynamics Observatory (SDO), and Hinode. The CfA, via the Smithsonian Astrophysical Observatory, recently played a major role in the Lynx X-ray Observatory, a NASA-funded large mission concept study commissioned as part of the 2020 Astronomy and Astrophysics Decadal Survey ("Astro2020"). If launched, Lynx would be the most powerful X-ray observatory constructed to date, enabling order-of-magnitude advances in capability over Chandra.

SAO is one of the 13 stakeholder institutes for the Event Horizon Telescope Board, and the CfA hosts its Array Operations Center. In 2019, the project revealed the first direct image of a black hole. The result is widely regarded as a triumph not only of observational astronomy, but of its intersection with theoretical astrophysics. Union of the observational and theoretical subfields of astrophysics has been a major focus of the CfA since its founding.

In 2018, the CfA rebranded, changing its official name to the "Center for Astrophysics | Harvard & Smithsonian" in an effort to reflect its unique status as a joint collaboration between Harvard University and the Smithsonian Institution. Today, the CfA receives roughly 70% of its funding from NASA, 22% from Smithsonian federal funds, and 4% from the National Science Foundation. The remaining 4% comes from contributors including the United States Department of Energy, the Annenberg Foundation, as well as other gifts and endowments.

=== Organizational structure ===
Research across the CfA is organized into six divisions and seven research centers:

==== Scientific divisions within the CfA ====
- Atomic and Molecular Physics (AMP)
- High Energy Astrophysics (HEA)
- Optical and Infrared Astronomy (OIR)
- Radio and Geoastronomy (RG)
- Solar, Stellar, and Planetary Sciences (SSP)
- Theoretical Astrophysics (TA)

==== Centers hosted at the CfA ====
- Chandra X-ray Center (CXC), the science operations center for NASA's Chandra X-ray Observatory
- Institute for Theory and Computation (ITC)
- Institute for Theoretical Atomic, Molecular, and Optical Physics (ITAMP)
- Center for Parallel Astrophysical Computing (CPAC)
- Minor Planet Center (MPC)
- Telescope Data Center (TDC)
- Radio Telescope Data Center (RTDC)
- Solar & Stellar X-ray Group (SSXG)

The CfA is also host to the Harvard University Department of Astronomy, large central engineering and computation facilities, the Science Education Department, the John G. Wolbach Library, the world's largest database of astronomy and physics papers (ADS), and the world's largest collection of astronomical photographic plates.

=== Observatories operated with CfA participation ===
==== Ground-based observatories ====
- Fred Lawrence Whipple Observatory
- Magellan telescopes
- MMT Observatory
- Event Horizon Telescope
- South Pole Telescope
- Submillimeter Array
- 1.2-Meter Millimeter-Wave Telescope
- Very Energetic Radiation Imaging Telescope Array System (VERITAS)

==== Space-based observatories and probes ====
- Chandra X-ray Observatory
- Transiting Exoplanet Survey Satellite (TESS)
- Parker Solar Probe
- Hinode
- Kepler
- Solar Dynamics Observatory (SDO)
- Solar and Heliospheric Observatory (SOHO)
- Spitzer Space Telescope

==== Planned future observatories ====
- Lynx X-ray Observatory
- Giant Magellan Telescope
- Murchison Widefield Array
- Square Kilometer Array
- Pan-STARRS
- Vera C. Rubin Observatory (formerly called the Large Synoptic Survey Telescope)

== See also ==
- Clara Sousa-Silva, research scientist
- List of astronomical observatories
