= Slitless spectroscopy =

Astronomical technique

Slitless spectroscopy is spectroscopy done without a small slit to allow only light from a small region to be diffracted. It works best in sparsely populated fields, as it spreads each point source out into its spectrum, and crowded fields can be too confused to be useful for some applications. It also faces the problem that for extended sources, nearby emission lines will overlap. This technique is a basic form of snapshot hyperspectral imaging. Slitless spectroscopy is used for astronomical surveys and in fields, such as solar physics, where time evolution is important. Both types of application benefit from higher speed operation of a slitless spectrograph: conventional spectrographs require multiple exposures, scanning the slit across the target, to acquire a complete spectral image, while a slitless spectrograph can capture a complete image plane in one exposure.

The Crossley telescope utilized a slitless spectrograph that was originally employed by Nicholas Mayall.

The Henry Draper Catalogue, published 1924, contains stellar classifications for hundreds of thousands of stars, based on spectra taken with the objective prism method at Harvard College Observatory. The work of classification was led initially by Williamina Fleming and later by Annie Jump Cannon, with contributions from many other female astronomers including Florence Cushman.

Slitless spectrographs encounter an unusual form of specular reflection at the grating, which leads to anisotropic image distortion called Littrow expansion or compression. The distortion occurs because the normal rules of specular reflection do not apply to reflective gratings operated far from the non-dispersive reflection angle.

== See also ==
- Echelle grating
- Fine Guidance Sensor and Near Infrared Imager and Slitless Spectrograph (JWST component)
