= Anna Winlock =

American astronomer

- Born: September 15, 1857; Cambridge, Massachusetts
- Died: January 4, 1904 (aged 46); Boston, Massachusetts
- Known for: One of the first members of female computer group known as "the Harvard Computers."
- Parents: Joseph Winlock (father); Isabella Lane Winlock (mother)
- Scientific career
- Fields: Astronomy
- Workplaces: Harvard College Observatory

Anna Winlock (1857–1904) was an American astronomer and human computer, one of the first members of female computer group known as "the Harvard Computers." She made the most complete catalog of stars near the north and south poles of her era. She is also remembered for her calculations and studies of asteroids. In particular, she did calculations on 433 Eros and 475 Ocllo.

== Early years ==
Winlock was born in Cambridge, Massachusetts on September 15, 1857, to astronomer Joseph Winlock and Isabella Lane. Winlock attended the Cambridge Schools as a child and began to develop an interest in both mathematics and the Greek language. By age 10, Anna had watched her father go from Superintendent at the American Nautical Almanac Office in Cambridge, Massachusetts, to the Director of the Harvard College Observatory as well as a professor of Astronomy at the main Harvard College. Encouraged by her father, she exhibited remarkable abilities in mathematics and took an early interest in observational astronomy. Upon her graduation she received a letter from her principal expressing his appreciation for her Greek and of her character. Her father influenced her interest in astronomy. When she was twelve, she attended a solar eclipse expedition with her father in his home state of Kentucky. In June 1875, Joseph died shortly after Winlock had graduated from secondary school. Winlock quickly followed in her father's footsteps becoming one of the first female paid staff members of the Harvard College Observatory.

== Harvard College Observatory ==
After the death of her father, it fell upon her to find financial support for her mother and four siblings, and soon she approached the Harvard College Observatory seeking a job in calculations. Specifically, she was capable of reducing volumes of unreduced observations, a decades worth of numbers in a useless state, that previously her father had left unfinished. The interim director of the observatory complained that he could not process the data, as "the condition of the funds is an objection to hiring anyone." Winlock presented herself to the observatory and offered to reduce the observations. She quickly proved invaluable to the observatory, working extensively on meridian circle observations and precise star cataloging calculations. Having been previously introduced to the principles of mathematical astronomy by her father she seemed like a capable asset to the observatory and could be paid less than half the prevailing rate for calculating at the time. Harvard was able to offer her twenty-five cents an hour to do the computations. Winlock found the conditions acceptable and took the position.

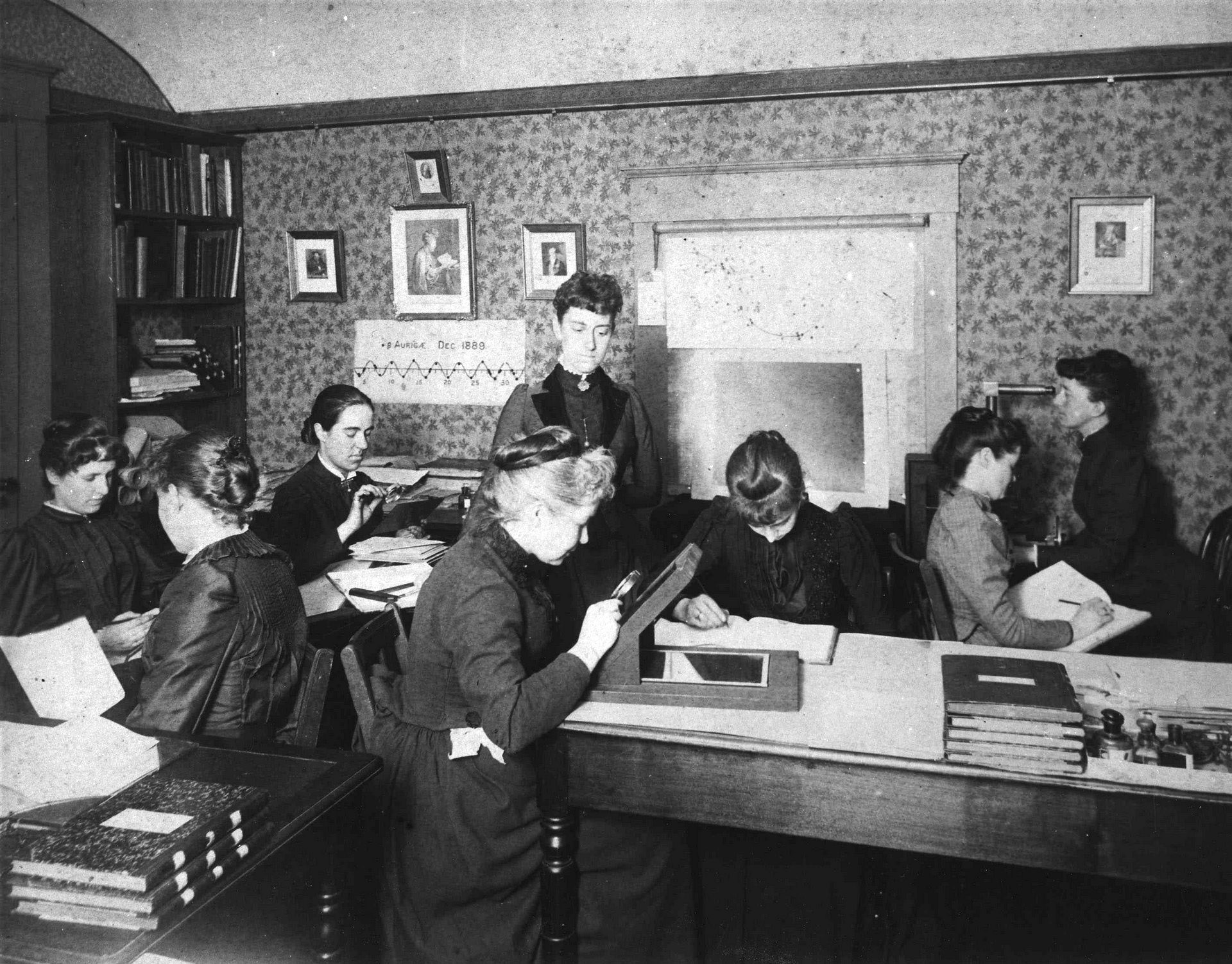
The Harvard computers at the Harvard College Observatory

In less than a year, she was joined at the observatory by three other women who also served as computers; they became known as Harvard Computers, gaining notoriety for leaving an uncomfortable example on the government computing agencies because of the women's low wages and arduous work, even though it was of high quality. In 1886, Louisa Winlock, Anna's younger sister, joined her in the computing room. Anna Winlock found it important the work to be done in astronomy, especially for women. Beyond her calculations, she was also involved in determining asteroid orbits, contributing to early studies of the asteroid Eros, which later became the first asteroid to be closely studied by a spacecraft. By her own development as a scientist and her lasting contributions to the stellar program of the observatory, she served as an example that women were equally capable as men of doing astronomical work.

== Major contributions ==
Through her thirty-year career at the Harvard College Observatory, Winlock contributed to the many projects the observatory faced. Her most significant work involved the continuous and arduous work of reducing and computing meridian circle observations. She played a crucial role in ensuring the accuracy of positional data, which was fundamental for tracking celestial objects over time. Five years earlier under the direction of her father, the observatory collaborated with multiple foreign observatories in a project for preparing a comprehensive star catalog. The project was divided into sections or zones by circles parallel to the celestial equator. Winlock began to work on the section called the "Cambridge Zone" shortly after being hired on by the observatory. Working over twenty years on the project, her meticulous calculations allowed Harvard to be one of the first institutions to publish its portion of the Astronomische Gesellschaft Katalog, a milestone in stellar cataloging. The work done by her team on the Cambridge Zone contributed significantly to the Astronomische Gesellschaft Katalog, which contains information on more than one-hundred thousand stars and is used worldwide by many observatories and their researchers. Besides her work on the Cambridge Zone, she also contributed to many independent projects. She supervised in the creation of the Observatory Annals (a collection of tables that provide the positions of variable stars in clusters) into 38 volumes. Winlock also gained a lot of media attention in 1901 when she and Dr. Simon Newcom published their joint work computing the path of a newly discovered asteroid, Ocllo, figuring out that it had the least circular orbit of any asteroid yet known.

== Death ==
On December 17, 1903, she visited the Harvard College Observatory for what would be the last time, and she continued working through the holiday season. The last entry in her notebook of reductions was on New Years Day 1904. Three days later, she died suddenly at the age of 46 in Boston, Massachusetts. A funeral service was held at St. John's Chapel in Cambridge.
