= Evelyn Leland =

American astronomer

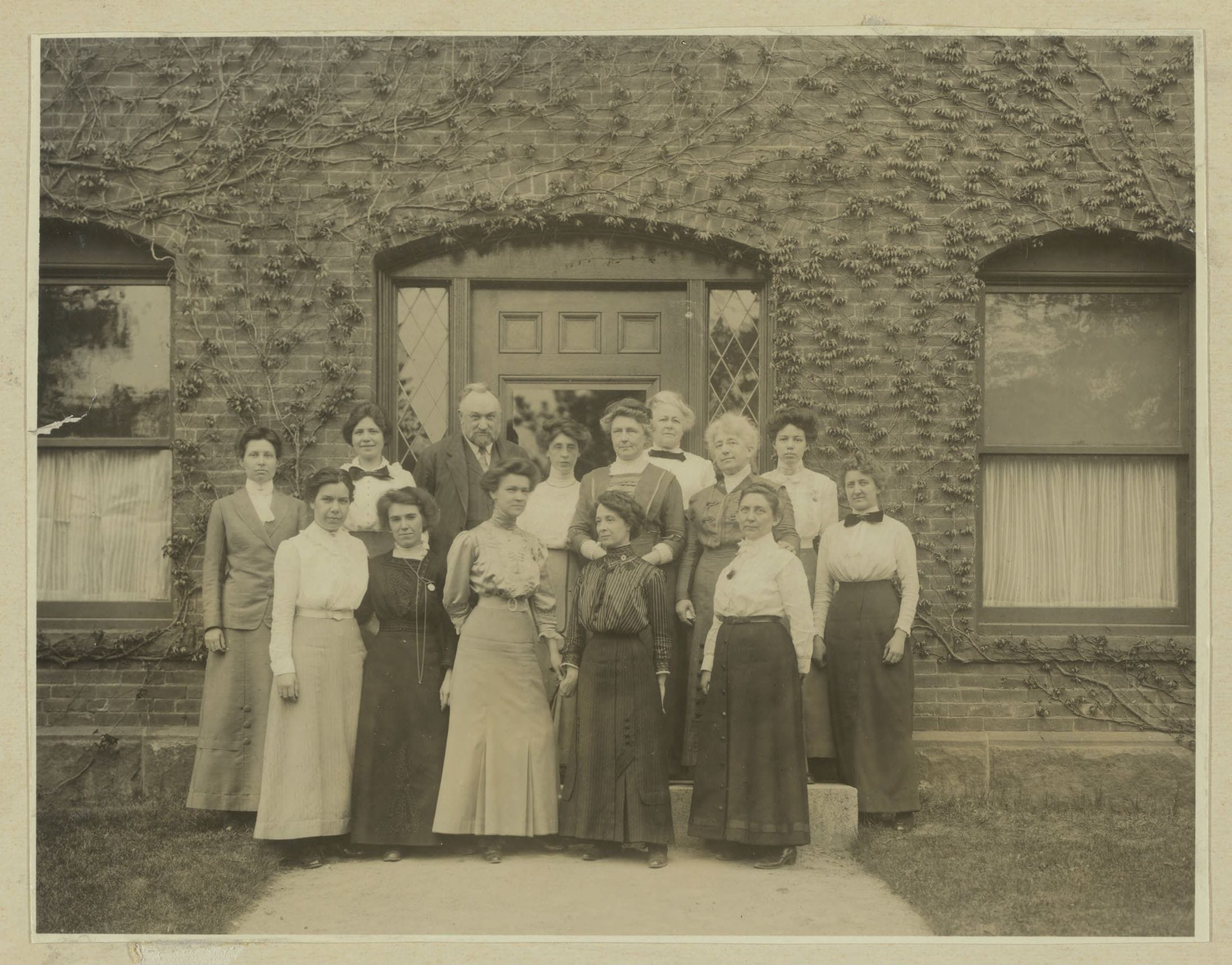
Harvard computers. Back row (L to R): Margaret Harwood (far left), Mollie O'Reilly, Edward C. Pickering, Edith Gill, Annie Jump Cannon, Evelyn Leland (behind Cannon), Florence Cushman, Marion Whyte (behind Cushman), Grace Brooks. Front row: Arville Walker, unknown (possibly Johanna Mackie), Alta Carpenter, Mabel Gill, Ida Woods. Image courtesy of the Harvard-Smithsonian Center for Astrophysics. The photograph was taken on 13 May 1913.

Evelyn Frances Leland (1867–1931) was an American astronomer and member of "Harvard Computers," a group of female astronomers who worked at the Harvard College Observatory under Director Edward Pickering. She worked for 36 years (1889–1925) as his assistant, and represented his team. Leland and her colleagues performed an analysis of photographic plates taken in Cambridge and Arequipa, Peru. She was involved in computing stellar spectra and discovering variable stars. She also worked with other members from the observatory to publish the paper.

== Historical backgrounds ==
Leland has been involved in a lot of data collection and analysis, but she never produced an astrophysical theory. Her employer, Edward Pickering, was deeply involved in it. Pickering emphasized the accumulation of data rather than theoretical research. He believed that theories not supported by data were worthless, and that observers with their own theories were more likely to be biased, leading to inaccurate data. Therefore, at the Harvard College Observatory, there was an opportunity for a woman with a talent for patient and skillful cataloging, like Leland. This was both beneficial and restrictive for women who wanted to work as scientists. His ideas were not idiosyncratic, but common in the scientific community of the time. In astronomy around 1900, jobs were determined by gender. Whereas men's work was telescope observations, data

Evelyn Frances Leland
- Born: 1867
- Died: 1931 (aged 63–64)
- Known for: Stellar Spectra Calculations Expert on Variable Stars
- Scientific career
- Institutions: Harvard College Observatory (1889-1925)

interpretation, and publication of results, women's work was measurement and classification of data collected by men. Perseverance and keen insight were required of women, not originality or scientific thinking. The high proportion of women in astronomy, botany, zoology, and anthropology in the late nineteenth and early twentieth centuries was due to the large amounts of data that these fields required to process.

She worked seven hours a day, six days a week except Sundays. (However, Williamina P. Fleming states in her diary that the actual working hours were from 9:00 am to 6:00 pm.) The starting wage for female computers was 25 cents an hour. Leland made $546 a year, compared to an average male salary of about $800 at the time. This salary differential was not due to her ability, but because of the gender difference. In an 1898 report, Pickering said that Harvard Computers could do work on a par with better paid male astronomers. He states that their salary differential allows him to hire three to four times as many women.

== Achievements ==
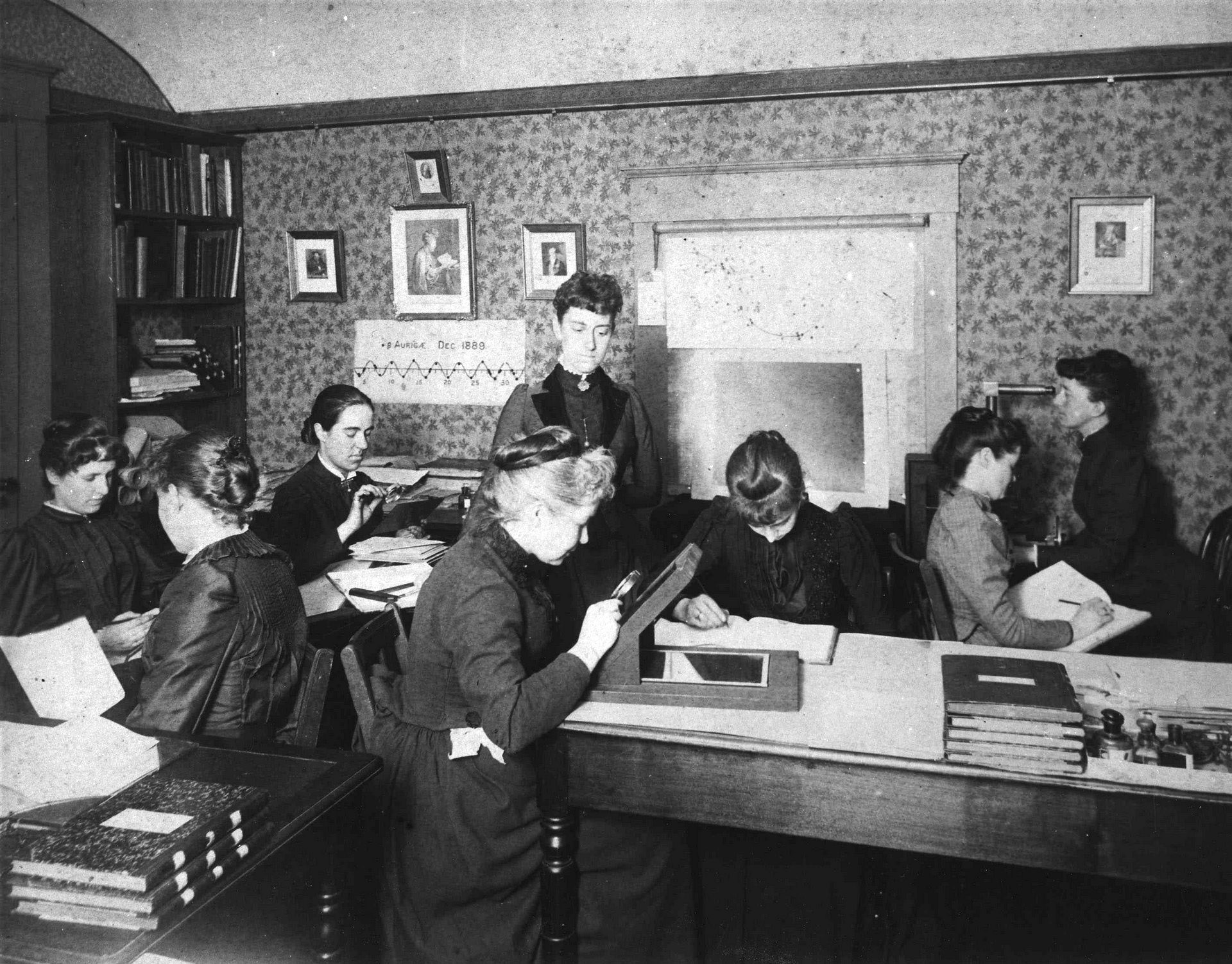
Photo of Harvard computer working in the room. This was taken in 1891. From left to right: possibly Mabel Stevens, unknown woman, Antonia Maury, possibly Evelyn Leland (seated), Williamina Fleming, unknown woman, unknown woman, probably Florence Cushman. This description is based on http://hea-www.harvard.edu/~fine/Observatory/eleland.html#ComputersWithoutPickeringWiki

The observatory's research on stellar spectra required meticulous analysis of numerous fragile glass plates on which light from distant bodies had been captured at the Arequipa Station in Peru, and then shipped to Harvard's campus in Cambridge, Massachusetts. With other human "computers," Leland measured and calculated the brightness of the stellar spectra extensively, and discovered new variable stars as well as other "objects with peculiar spectra." Leland has been involved in projects to measure the brightness and period of tens of thousands of variable stars in star clusters such as Omega Centauri, Alpha Centauri, M5, and Epsilon Aurigae. In 1903, she and Williamina Fleming investigated the possibility of a new nova in the constellation Gemini discovered by a British astronomer. In 1906, Leland, Annie Jump Canon and Henrietta Swan Leavitt began an all-sky search for variable stars. To find out the magnitude of every star in the sky, Pickering asked Leland and Cannon to learn how Leavitt discovered variable stars. The method involved assigning three people each a third in the sky and visually comparing five time-lapse images in each region of the sky. By this method, Leland discovered eight new variable stars. Leland also measured the brightness and position of objects such as stars Nova Sagittarii, Mu Serpentis, asteroid Eros, and Saturn's moon Phoebe.

Solon Irving Bailey, who helped establish the Harvard observing station at Arequipa and later replaced Pickering as acting director of the observatory, was interested in the study of variable stars. Bailey's work contained speculative elements, and his theories needed to be supported by data. He was assisted by Leland in determining the position and brightness of the variables. She collaborated with him on observations of globular clusters in the Milky Way, and found variable stars very strongly associated with globular clusters. They are characterized by a variable period of several hours, and are a new type of variable star, different from the Type I Cepheids discovered by Henrietta Swan Leavitt in the same period. By 1913, analysis of data from 110 variable stars revealed that their variability periods ranged from four hours to one day, and that each had approximately the same brightness. These variable stars discovered by Leland and Bailey are named cluster-type variable stars. They had a good working relationship and influenced each other. Leland had a particularly strong affinity for the southern sky because the plate Bailey made was of the southern sky taken in Peru. On the one hand, Bailey trusted Leland so much that he sometimes sent her a plate with instructions. His faith in Leland is also evident elsewhere. Bailey rarely mentioned the names of his assistants in his writings. However, the cover of the 1919 publication on variables in Messier 15 mentioned his cooperation with Leland and Ida E. Woods.

There are over 500,000 photographs of the celestial glass plates worked on by Harvard Computers, each contained in a paper envelope. About 20% of these are themed on stellar variability, proper motion, galactic dynamics, cosmology, meteors, and comets. Along with information about the plate itself, such as the date, unique identification number, telescope used, and sky area, the jacket often bears the signature of the person who used it. One of these, plate MC6474, which was worked on until the end of 1917, has a "L" signature on the jacket. It can be speculated that this is Leland's signature. Using these materials, the names of 216 female astronomers active between 1875 and 1975 were discovered from approximately 400,000 jackets.

== Photo gallery ==
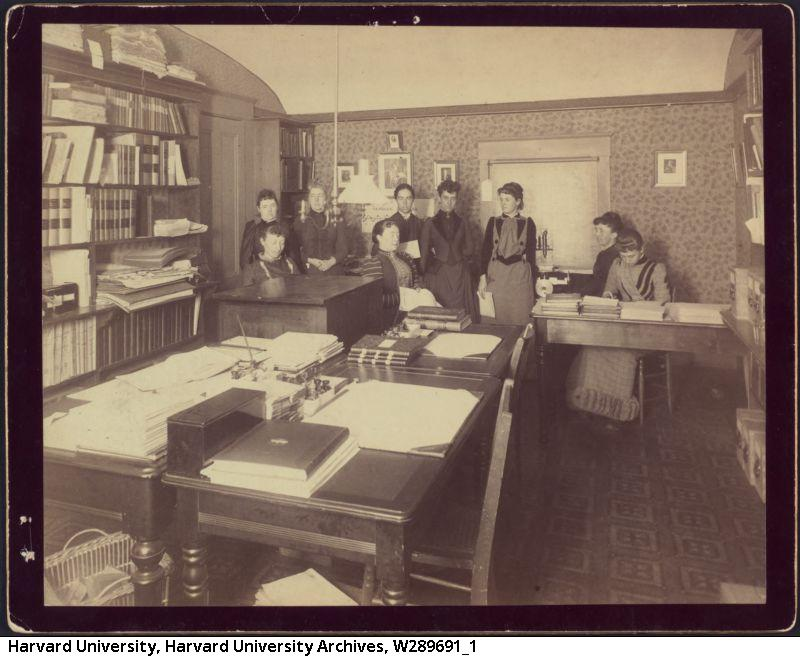
Harvard Computers and Mary Anna Palmer Draper are pictured together. It was taken in the long computing room on the south side of the second floor of the building in 1891, facing east. Left to right: unknown woman (standing), unknown woman (seated), possibly Evelyn Leland, Mrs. Draper (seated), Antonia Maury, Williamina Fleming, possibly Mabel C. Stevens (or some other Stevens), probably Florence Cushman, unknown woman. This description is based on http://hea-www.harvard.edu/~fine/Observatory/eleland.html#ComputersDraperPose Photo credit: HUV 1210 (9–3), olvwork289691. Harvard University Archives.

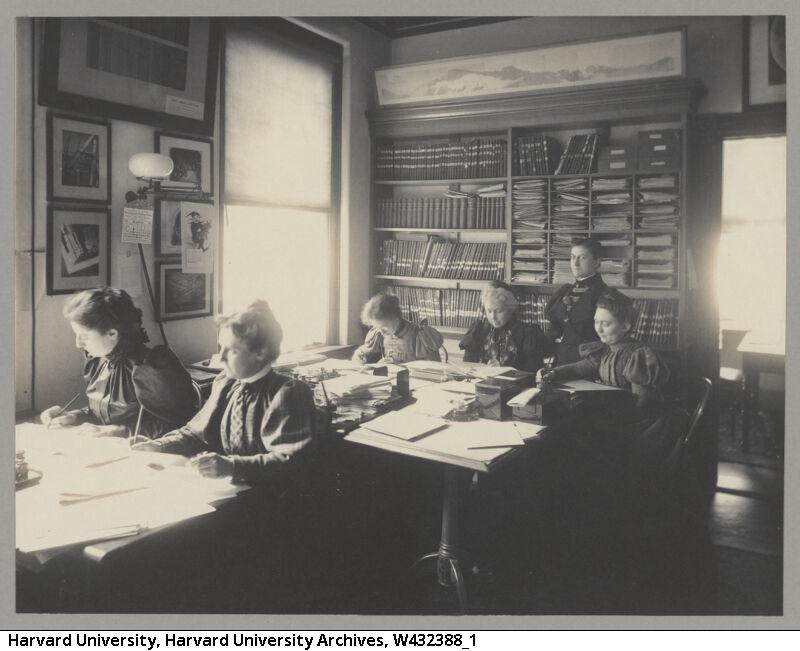
Harvard Computers working in a room in the new brick building, built in 1892. According to the information of a calendar shown in the image, this photo taken in March 1898. Williamina Fleming is standing. Immediately in front of her are Evelyn Leland (back row center) and Ida E. Woods to the right. The rest are unknown, but the woman closest to the camera could be Annie Jump Cannon. This description is based on http://hea-www.harvard.edu/~fine/Observatory/eleland.html#ComputersBrickBuilding Photo credit: UAV 630.271 (E4116), olvwork432388. Harvard University Archives.

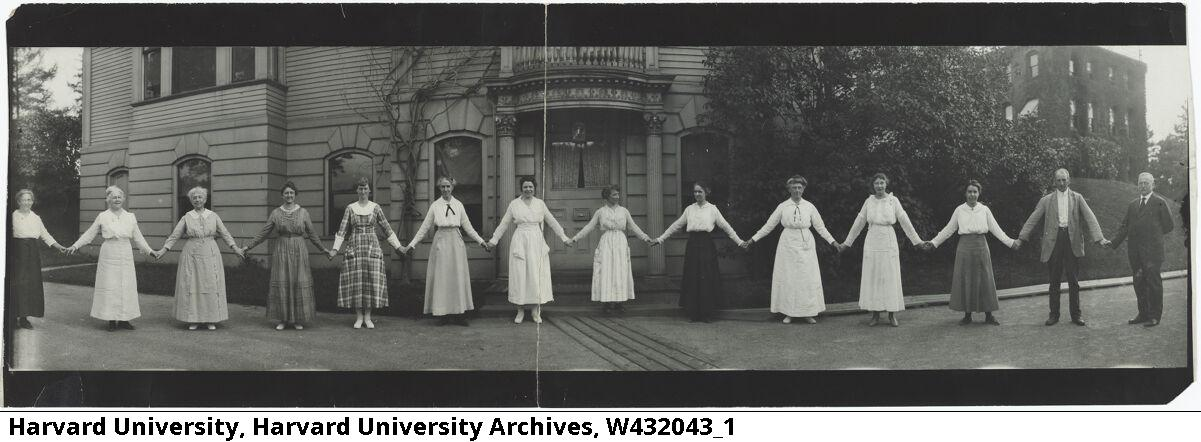
It is a picture called "paper doll" in which Harvard Computers are shown holding hands. The shooting year is 1918 theory is influential. Left to right: Ida E. Woods, Evelyn Leland, Florence Cushman, Grace Brooks, Mary Vann, Henrietta Swan Leavitt, Mollie O'Reilly, Mabel Gill, Alta Carpenter, Annie Jump Cannon, Dorothy Block, Arville Walker, Frank E. Hinckley (telescope operator), Edward King (chief of stellar photography). Photo credit: UAV 630.271 (391), olvwork432043. Harvard University Archives.

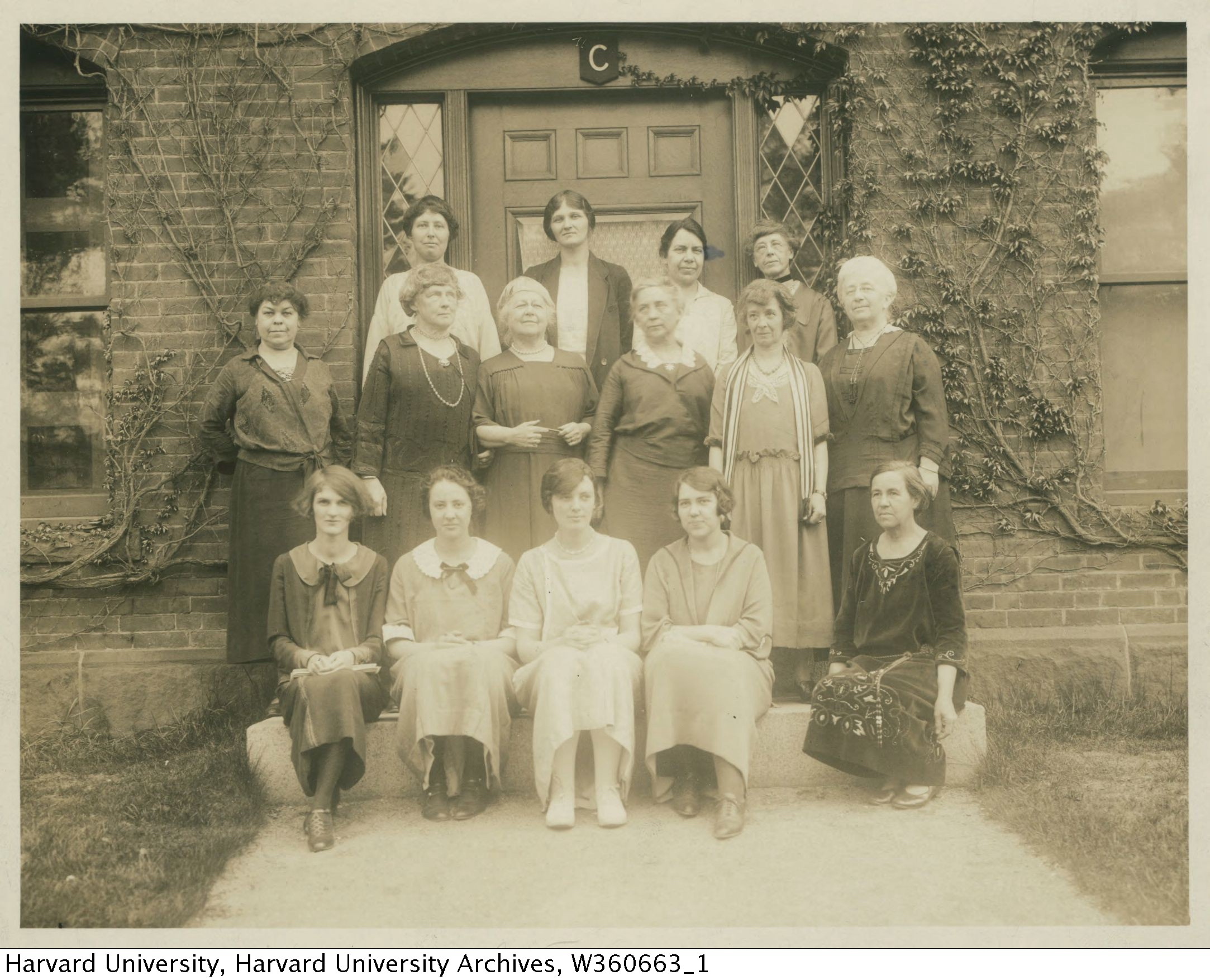
A cross-generational group photo of the women who worked at Harvard. This was taken in 1925. It is a photo that tells the end of women computers and the beginning of women scientists. Back row: Margaret Harwood, Cecilia Payne, Arville D. Walker, Edith F. Gill. Middle row: Lillian L. Hodgdon, Annie Jump Cannon, Evelyn Leland, Ida E. Woods, Mabel Gill, Florence Cushman. Bottom row: Agnes M. Hoovens, Mary B. Howe, Harvia H. Wilson, Margaret Walton Mayall, Antonia C. Maury. This description is based on http://hea-www.harvard.edu/~fine/Observatory/eleland.html#AsWeWere Photo credit: HUPSF Observatory (19), olvwork360663. Harvard University Archives.

== Selected works ==
- Large Magellanic Cloud, 1921
- Long Exposure H.S. Regions and Series, 1918/1919
- M Determinations - North Pole Plates, 1918/1919
- M Determinations - North Pole Plates, 1919
- M Determinations - North Pole Plates, 1919/1920
- M Determinations - North Pole Plates, 1919/1920
- M Determinations - North Pole Plates, 1920
- MC and A Plates, 1921
- MC Plates, 1921/1922
- Measure of Eros (South Pole), 1899/1902
- Measures, new satellite (Phoebe) of Saturn, Nova Sgr, 1899/1906
- Measures of Eros, 1902/1904
- Measures of M3, etc., 1902/1903
- Measures of Variables in M15, 1917
- Measures of Variables in M15, 1916/1917
- Measures of Variables in M15, 1917/1918
- Measures of Variables in M15, 1917/1918
- MF Series, 1920
- MF Series, 1920/1921
- Miscellaneous Observations - Variables, 1893/1896
- Miscellaneous Observations - Variables M5, 1896
- Miscellaneous Observations - Variables M5, 1896
- Miscellaneous Observations - Variables M5, 1896/1897
- Miscellaneous Observations - Variables M5, 1897/1898
- Miscellaneous Observations - Variables W Cen., 1897/1898
- New Satellite of Saturn and North Polar Sequence, 1904/1911
- Observing Book, 1918
- Observing Book, 1918
- Observing Book - M5, 1913
- Scale measures, 1907/1910
- Scale measures, 1911/1912
- Scale measures, 1910/1912
- Scale measures, 1910/1911
- Scale measures, 1912
- Scale measures, 1913/1914
- Search for variables; measures, 1902/1903
- Search for variables; measures, 1903/1904
- Search for variables; measures, 1904/1907
- Search for variables; measures, 1907/1909
- Search for variables; measures, 1904/1910
- Series Reductions, 1913
- Series Reductions, 1913
- Series Reductions, 1913/1914
- Series Reductions, 1913/1914
- Series Reductions, 1913/1915
- Series Reductions, 1915/1917
- Series Reductions, 1915/1917
- Series Reductions, 1915/1917
- Series Reductions, 1914/1915
- Series Reductions, 1914/1915
- Series Reductions and M5 variables, 1914/1915
