= Harvard Computers =

Team of women who processed astronomical data

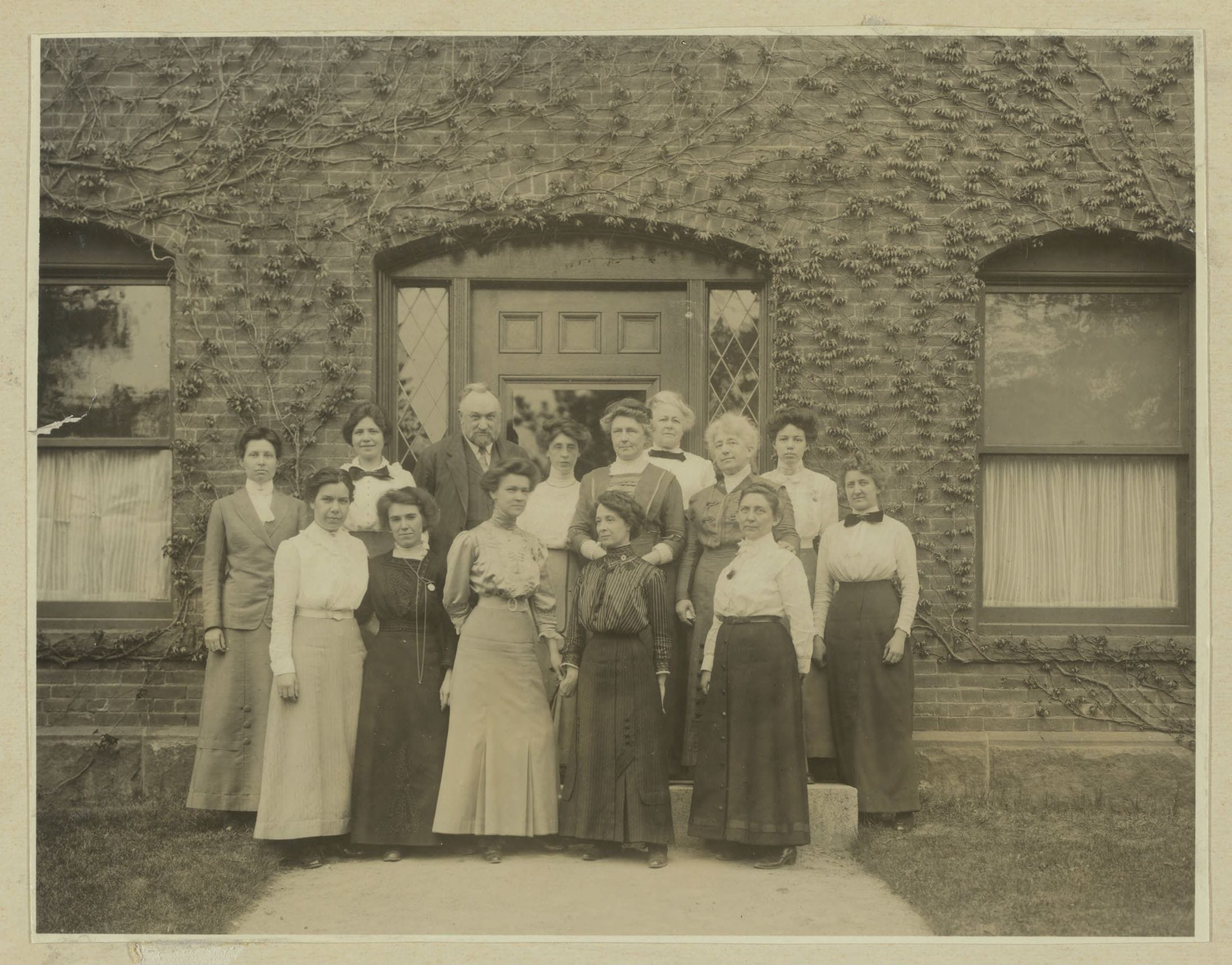
The Harvard Computers standing in front of Building C at the Harvard College Observatory, 13 May 1913

The Harvard Computers were multiple generations of women working as skilled workers and astronomers to process astronomical data primarily from photographic plates at the Harvard College Observatory in Cambridge, Massachusetts, United States. Created during the tenure of Edward Charles Pickering (1877 to 1919) and, first headed by Williamina Fleming then Annie Jump Cannon.

The women were challenged to make sense of these patterns by devising a scheme for sorting the stars into categories. Annie Jump Cannon's success at this activity made her famous in her own lifetime, and she produced a stellar classification system that is still in use today. Antonia Maury discerned in the spectra a way to assess the relative sizes of stars, and Henrietta Leavitt showed how the cyclic changes of certain variable stars could serve as distance markers in space.

While documented instances show individual women were paid for work before the 1880s, the consistent hiring of women who worked together and were managed by other women began with the photographic project funded by the scientist and philanthropist Mary Anna Draper in honor of her late husband, Henry Draper. Williamina Fleming would be the first person in charge of this group and manage and hire over 44 women anstronomical computers in her career. Anna Winlock and Florence Cushman would be early women of note, other scientists and astronomers like Henrietta Swan Leavitt, Annie Jump Cannon, Cecilia Payne-Gaposchkin, and Dorrit Hoffleit would be employees under this group at sometime in their career. Representing many firsts for women working at Harvard University, over 200 women are known to have worked in this group from the 1870s to the 1970s. These women would perform various tasks that would be paired with their own skills and educational backgrounds. These ranged from highly specialized work like complex mathematical calculations, photometry, spectroscopy, and classifying astronomical objects to clerical, editorial, administrative, and correspondence roles. Collectively and individually, foundational discoveries were made by these female scientists in the fields of astronomy, astrophysics, cosmology, and atomic physics,, among others.

== History ==
In the 19th century, the Harvard College Observatory faced the challenge of working through an overwhelming amount of astronomical data due to improvements in photographic technology. Harvard Observatory's director, Edward Charles Pickering, hired a group of women to analyze the astronomical data recorded on the growing collection of plate negatives. While Pickering was the director of the Harvard Observatory, he hired over eighty women. These women were known as computers. Although Pickering believed that gathering data at astronomical observatories was not the most appropriate work, it seems that several factors contributed to his decision to hire women instead of men. Among them was that men were paid much more than women, so he could employ more staff with the same budget. This was relevant in a time when the amount of astronomical data was surpassing the capacity of the Observatories to process it. Although some of Pickering's female staff were astronomy graduates, their wages were similar to those of unskilled workers. They usually earned between 25 and 50 cents per hour (between $8 and $16 in 2025), more than a factory worker but less than a clerical one. Most of the women depended financially on their friends and family members and lived with coworkers to combat the low wages. Although the wages Pickering provided were low, it was common to pay women less than men during the 20th century and does not discount his advocation for women in astronomy. In describing the dedication and efficiency with which the Harvard Computers, including Cushman, undertook this effort, Edward Pickering said, "a loss of one minute in the reduction of each estimate would delay the publication of the entire work by the equivalent of the time of one assistant for two years." Another reason why Pickering decided to hire women over men was he thought allowing women to conduct astronomical research would show the general public that women were capable of higher thinking and worthy of higher education. The first female computer to be hired at the Harvard Observatory was Anna Winlock. Pickering's first hire was Williamina Fleming six years later in 1881. Together, Fleming and Pickering continued to hire female computers through the twentieth century. At times women offered to work at the observatory for free in order to gain experience in a field that was difficult to get into.

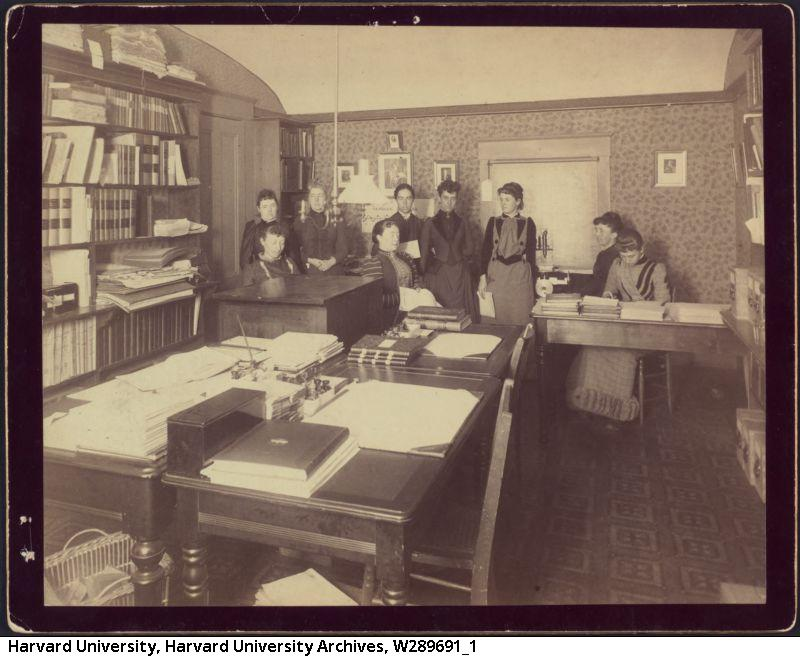
The Harvard Computers pictured on the south side of the second floor of the long computing room in 1891.

The computer position was one of the lower class positions at the observatory due to the pay and little chance for promotion. Under the Henry Draper Memorial project, the women were often tasked with measuring the brightness, position, and color of stars. The goal of the project was to photograph the stars and classify their spectrum. Their work was often segregated from men, so teams of male astronomers would take photographs of the stars in the evening and send them to the women at Harvard for analysis. The work included such tasks as classifying stars by calculating their exact position and movement, predicting the return of comets, and by comparing the photographs to known catalogs and reducing the photographs while accounting for things like atmospheric refraction, parallax, and error in various instruments in order to render the clearest possible image. While the work was repetitive, it still required attention and accuracy. Fleming herself described the work as "so nearly alike that there will be little to describe outside ordinary routine work of measurement, examination of photographs, and of work involved in the reduction of these observations". The work would not have been possible without photographic plate technology. With such technology, dry, color sensitive plates are used to capture photo visual and photo-red magnitudes. The dry plates allowed for longer exposure over longer time intervals, increasing the accuracy of the photographs and range of stars capable of being photographed. The plate technology allowed the women to classify stars more accurately than before.

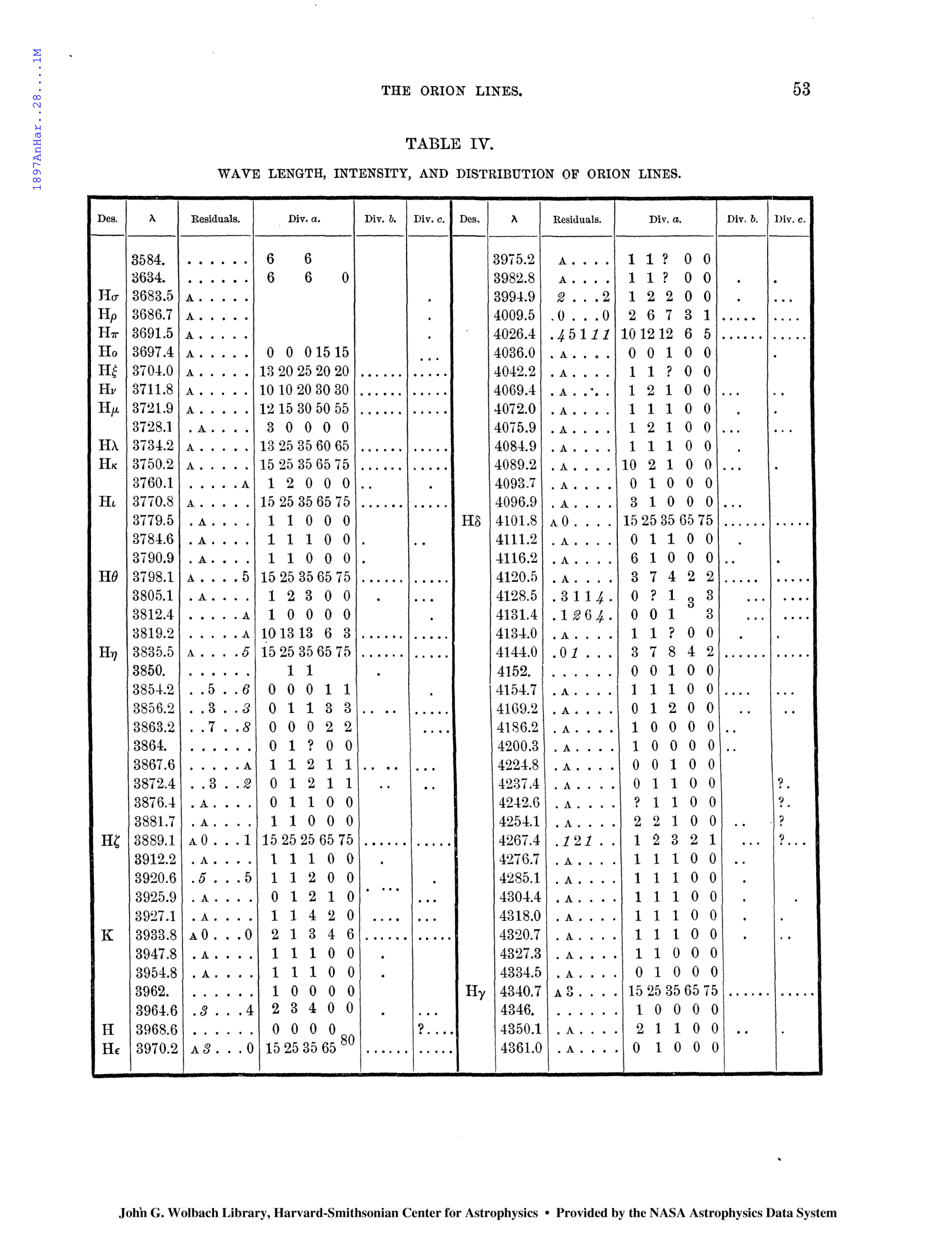
An example of wavelength and distribution calculations done by the computers on the Orion lines.

The observatory, with the help of computers, made several breakthroughs in classifying and cataloging the stars. One such accomplishment was the Henry Draper Catalogue. Following the death of Henry Draper (1882), Mary Anna Palmer Draper funded the Mount Wilson Observatory. The work on the catalogue was led by Williamina Fleming. Following the initial classifications done by Fleming (1890), Antonia Maury helped place stars in their correct positions and did further research on the spectra of the stars with Pickering (1901). Henrietta Leavitt discovered a relationship between a Cepheid variable’s brightness and its pulsation period (1908). Annie Jump Cannon and her team classified an average of 5,000 stars per month from the years 1912–1915. Florence Cushman helped organize and process the data. The catalog was published between 1918 and 1924. Following the death of Pickering (1919), Cannon took control of the projects. An extension to the original works was published between 1925 and 1936, where over 46,850 stars were classified.

In the later years of the program, following the publication of the catalog, several women joined and continued to make contributions. Margaret Walton Mayall contributed to the classification of stellar spectra. She later went on to lead the American Association of Variable Star Observers. Helen Sawyer Hogg specialized in cataloging variable stars within globular clusters. Her work helped lay the foundation for understanding stellar evolution and the structure of the universe. Cecilia Payne-Gaposchkin proved that stars are composed primarily of hydrogen and helium. Muriel Mussells Seyfert discovered three new ring nebulae on photographic plates, expanding the catalog of known planetary nebulae.

== Notable members ==
=== Mary Anna Palmer Draper ===
Mary Anna Palmer Draper (1839–1914) was an American astronomer who helped found the Mount Wilson Observatory.

Draper was the widow of Dr. Henry Draper, an astronomer who died before completing his work on the chemical composition of stars. She was very involved in her husband's work and wanted to finish his classification of stars after he died. Mary Draper quickly realized the task facing her was far too daunting for one person. She had received correspondence from Mr. Pickering, a close friend of hers and her husband's. Pickering offered to help finish her husband's work, and encouraged her to publish his findings up to the time of his death. Draper agreed to give Pickering the plates her husband had been working on, but took them to Harvard University herself since the plates were very small. While at the university, Draper met the Harvard Observatory's current computers and was able to observe some of the observatory's current projects. After some deliberation and much consideration, Draper decided in 1886 to donate money and a telescope of her husband's to the Harvard Observatory in order to photograph the spectra of stars. She had decided this would be the best way to continue her husband's work and erect his legacy in astronomy. She was very insistent on funding the memorial project with her own inheritance, as it would carry on her husband's legacy. She was a dedicated follower of the observatory and a great friend of Pickering's. In 1900, she funded an expedition to see the total solar eclipse occurring that year.

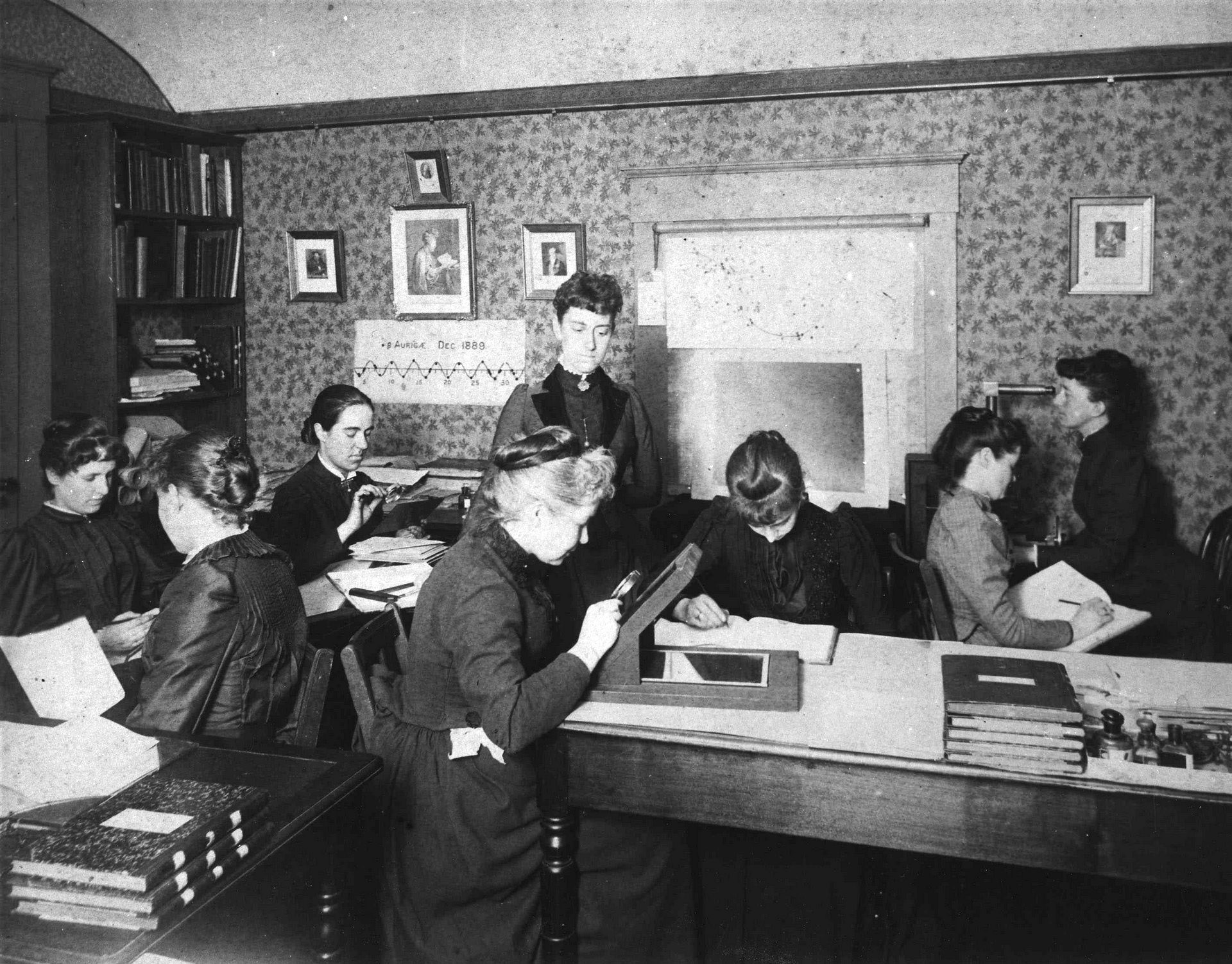
Harvard Computers at work, circa 1891.

=== Williamina Fleming ===
Williamina Fleming (1857–1911) was a Scottish immigrant astronomer who helped with the photographic classification of stellar spectra.

Fleming had no prior relation to Harvard, as she was a Scottish immigrant working as Pickering's housemaid. Her first assignment was to improve an existing catalog of stellar spectra, which later led to her appointment as head of the ‘’Henry Draper Catalogue’’ project. Fleming went on to help develop a classification of stars based on their hydrogen content, as well as play a major role in discovering the strange nature of white dwarf stars. Williamina continued her career in astronomy when she was appointed Harvard's Curator of Astronomical Photographs in 1899, also known as Curator of the Photographic Plates. At the age of 42, Fleming became the first woman at the observatory to hold a title of such nature. She remained the only woman curator until the 1950s. Her work also led to her becoming the first female American citizen to be elected to the Royal Astronomical Society in 1907. Throughout her career, Fleming was able to classify 10,000 spectra and found over 50 nebulae and over 300 stars. Fleming did not retire from working at the observatory, as she died at age 54 from pneumonia.

=== Antonia Maury ===
Antonia Maury (1866-1952) was an American astronomer who worked on calculating the orbit of a spectroscopic binary.

Maury was the niece of Henry Draper, and after recommendation from Mrs. Draper, was hired as a computer at the age of 22. She was a graduate from Vassar College with honors in physics, astronomy, and philosophy. Pickering was uncomfortable paying the average computer salary to someone with Antonia Maury's achievements, but ultimately ended up hiring her. Maury was first tasked with the spectral measurement of some of the brightest stars. Pickering then tasked Maury with reclassifying some of the stars after the publication of the Henry Draper Catalog. In 1889, Maury studied images of Mizar and found out that it was actually two stars based on two K-lines that became visible for the star every few weeks. Antonia took it upon herself to improve and redesigned the system of classification which was later adopted by the International Astronomical Union. Maury left the observatory in 1891 to begin teaching at the Gilman School in Cambridge Massachusetts. Later, Maury would return to the observatory in 1893 and 1895 to publish many of her observations of stellar spectra. Her work was finished with the help of Pickering and the computing staff and was published in 1897. Maury would return to Harvard College Observatory in 1918 as an adjunct professor. During this time, Maury's work began to be published under her own name due in part to the director Harlow Shapely. She would remain at the observatory until she retired in 1948.

=== Anna Winlock ===
Anna Winlock (1857–1904) was an American astronomer who helped catalog stars for the Henry Draper Catalogue.

Some of the first women who were hired to work as computers had familial connections to the Harvard Observatory’s male staff. For instance, Winlock, one of the first of the Harvard Computers, was the daughter of Joseph Winlock, the third director of the observatory and Pickering’s immediate predecessor. Anna Winlock joined the observatory in 1875 to assist in supporting her family after her father's unexpected passing. She tackled her father's unfinished data analysis, performing the arduous work of mathematically reducing meridian circle observations, which rescued a decade's worth of numbers that had been left in a useless state. Winlock also worked on a stellar cataloging section called the "Cambridge Zone". Working over twenty years on the project, the work done by her team on the Cambridge Zone contributed significantly to the Astronomische Gesellschaft Katalog, which contains information on more than one-hundred thousand stars and is used worldwide by many observatories and their researchers. Within a year of Anna Winlock's hiring, three other women joined the staff: Selina Bond, Rhoda Sauders, and a third, who was likely a relative of an assistant astronomer. In 1886, Anna's younger sister, Louisa Winlock, joined her in the computing room.

=== Annie Jump Cannon ===
Annie Jump Cannon (1863–1941) was an American astronomer who made a catalog of the stars, classifying and recording them. Following the death of Pickering in 1901 she took control over the observatory.

Pickering hired Cannon, a graduate of Wellesley College, to classify the southern stars. While at Wellesley, she took astronomy courses from one of Pickering's star students, Sarah Frances Whiting. She became the first female assistant to study variable stars at night. She studied the light curve of variable stars which could help suggest the type and causation of variation.

Cannon, adding to work done by fellow computer Antonia Maury, greatly simplified [Pickering and Fleming's star classification based on temperature] system, and in 1922, the International Astronomical Union adopted [Cannon's] as the official classification system for stars....During Pickering’s 42-year tenure at the Harvard Observatory, which ended only a year before he died, in 1919, he received many awards, including the Bruce Medal, the Astronomical Society of the Pacific’s highest honor. Craters on the moon and on Mars are named after him. And Annie Jump Cannon’s enduring achievement was dubbed the Harvard—not the Cannon—system of spectral classification.

Cannon's Harvard Classification Scheme is the basis of the today's familiar O B A F G K M system. She also categorized the variable stars into tables so they could be identified and compared more easily. These systems connect the color of stars to their temperature. According to Rebecca Dinerstein Knight, Cannon was able to work at a pace of classifying the spectra of 300 stars an hour and therefore was able to classify over 350,000 stars in her lifetime.

Cannon was the first female scientist to be recognized for many awards and titles in her field of study. She was the first woman to receive an honorary doctorate from the University of Oxford and the Henry Draper Medal from the National Academy of Sciences, and the first female officer in the American Astronomical Society. Cannon went on to establish her own Annie Jump Cannon Award for women in postdoctoral work. In 1934, Cannon awarded the first Annie Jump Cannon Award to Cecilia Payne-Gaposchkin for her contributions in analyzing stars and the stellar spectrum. The award was given out at an American Astronomical Society meeting, and for winning, Cannon awarded Gaposchkin $50 and a gold pin.

=== Henrietta Leavitt ===
Henrietta Swan Leavitt (1868-1921) was an American astronomer who worked to measure the distances between galaxies and determine the scale of modeling.

Leavitt arrived at the observatory in 1893. She had experience through her college studies, traveling abroad, and teaching. In academia, Leavitt excelled in mathematics courses at Cambridge. When she began working at the observatory she was tasked with measuring star brightness through photometry. She found hundreds of new variable stars after starting to analyze the Great Nebula in Orion and her work was expanded to study the variables of the entire sky with Annie Jump Cannon and Evelyn Leland. With skills gained in photometry, Leavitt compared stars in different exposures. Studying Cepheid variables in the Small Magellanic Cloud, she discovered that their apparent brightness was dependent on their period. Since all those stars were approximately the same distance from Earth, that meant their absolute brightness must depend on their period as well, allowing the use of Cepheid variables as a standard candle for determining cosmic distances. That, in turn, led directly to the modern understanding of the true size of the universe, and Cepheid variables are still an essential rung in the cosmic distance ladder.

Pickering published her work with his name as co-author. The legacy she left allowed future scientists to make further discoveries in space. Astronomer Edwin Hubble used Leavitt's method to calculate the distance of the nearest galaxy to the earth, the Andromeda Galaxy. This led to the realization that there are even more galaxies than previously thought.

=== Florence Cushman ===
Florence Cushman (1860–1940) was an American astronomer at the Harvard College Observatory who worked on the Henry Draper Catalogue.

Cushman was born in Boston, Massachusetts in 1860 and received her early education at Charlestown High School, where she graduated in 1877. In 1888, she began work at the Harvard College Observatory as an employee of Edward Pickering. Her classifications of stellar spectra contributed to Henry Draper Catalogue between 1918 and 1934. She stayed as an astronomer at the Observatory until 1937 and died in 1940 at the age of 80.

Cushman worked at the Harvard College Observatory from 1918 to 1937. Over the course of her nearly fifty-year career, she employed the objective prism method to analyze, classify, and catalog the optical spectra of hundreds of thousands of stars. In the 19th century, the photographic revolution enabled more detailed analysis of the night sky than had been possible with solely eye-based observations. In order to obtain optical spectra for measurement, male astronomers at the Harvard College Observatory expose glass plates on which the astronomical images were captured at night. During the daytime, female assistants like Florence analyzed the resultant spectra by reducing values, computing magnitudes, and cataloging their findings. She is credited with determining the positions and magnitudes of the stars listed in the 1918 edition of the Henry Draper Catalogue, which featured the spectra of roughly 222,000 stars.

== See also ==
- Evelyn Leland
- Cecilia Payne-Gaposchkin
- Muriel Mussells Seyfert
- West Area Computers
