= Florence Cushman =

American astronomer

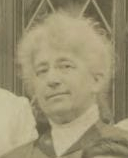
- Cushman in May 1913
- Born: January 30, 1860; Boston, Massachusetts, US
- Died: January 30, 1940 (Aged 80); Belmont, Massachusetts, U.S.
- Burial place: Mount Auburn Cemetery
- Education: Charlestown High School, 1877
- Employer: Harvard College Observatory
- Known for: One of the "Harvard Computers"

Florence Cushman (1860–1940) was an American astronomer specializing in stellar classification working with Edward Pickering and Annie Jump Cannon at the Harvard College Observatory. Her classifications of stars contributed to the Henry Draper Catalogue.

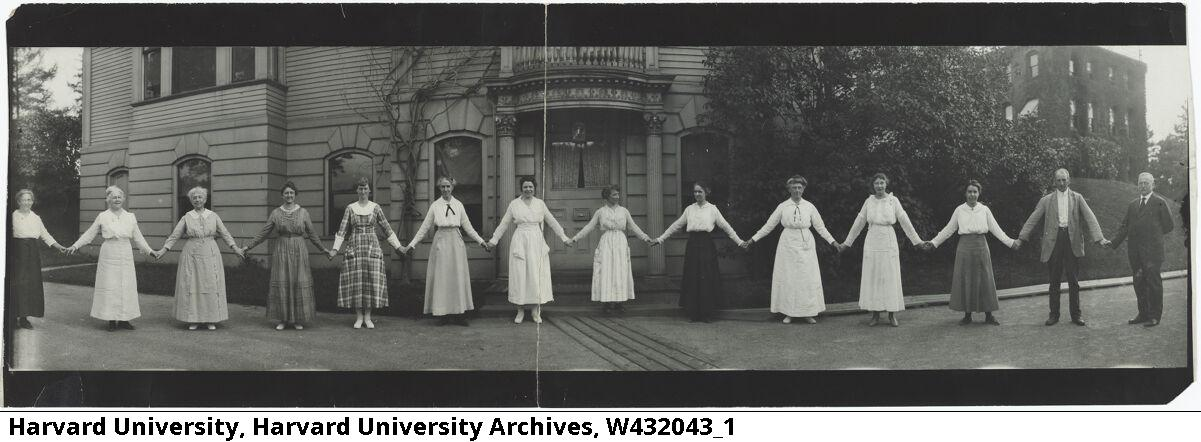
This photo was taken in 1918. It is a picture called "paper doll" in which Harvard Computers are shown holding hands. Left to right: Ida E. Woods, Evelyn Leland, Florence Cushman, Grace Brooks, Mary Vann, Henrietta Swan Leavitt, Mollie O'Reilly, Mabel Gill, Alta Carpenter, Annie Jump Cannon, Dorothy Block, Arville Walker, Frank E. Hinckley (telescope operator), Edward King (chief of stellar photography).

== Life ==
Florence was born in Boston, Massachusetts, and received her early education at Charlestown High School, where she graduated in 1877. In 1888, she began work at the Harvard College Observatory as an employee of Edward Pickering, observing and classifying stars. Florence was one of the "Harvard Computers" who worked under Pickering and, following his death in 1919, Annie Jump Cannon. Her classifications of stellar spectra contributed to Henry Draper Catalogue between 1918 and 1934. She stayed as an astronomer at the Observatory until 1937 and died January 30, 1940, at the age of 80.

== Career at the Harvard College Observatory ==
Florence Cushman worked and was a member of the Harvard College Observatory from 1888 to 1937. She started her work by observing and classifying stars as one of Annie Jump Cannon’s assistants. Florence was also in charge of proofreading text and tables in the catalogs before publication alongside other colleagues. Over the course of her forty-nine years at Harvard, she employed the objective prism method to analyze, classify, and catalog the optical spectra of hundreds of thousands of stars. In the 19th century, the photographic revolution enabled more detailed analysis of the night sky than had been possible with solely eye-based observations. In order to obtain optical spectra for measurement, male astronomers at the Observatory worked at night, exposing glass photographic plates to capture the astronomical images.

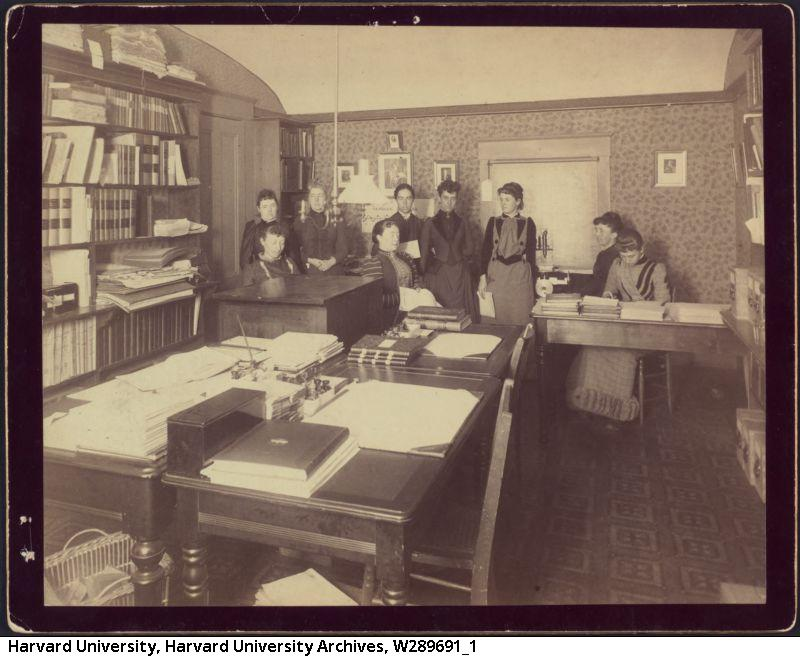
Harvard Computers and Mary Anna Palmer Draper are pictured together. Taken in the long computing room on the south side of the second floor of the building in 1891, facing east. Left to right: unknown woman (standing), unknown woman (seated), possibly Evelyn Leland, Mrs. Draper (seated), Antonia Maury, Williamina Fleming, possibly Mabel C. Stevens (or some other Stevens), probably Florence Cushman, unknown woman.

During the daytime, female assistants like Florence analyzed the resultant spectra by reducing values, computing magnitudes, and cataloging their findings. She is credited with determining the positions and magnitudes of the stars listed in the 1918 edition of the Henry Draper Catalogue, which featured the spectra of roughly 222,000 stars. In describing the dedication and efficiency with which the Harvard Computers, including Florence, undertook this effort, Edward Pickering said, "a loss of one minute in the reduction of each estimate would delay the publication of the entire work by the equivalent of the time of one assistant for two years." She is referred to as a “dignified galleon of a woman” and a “Lady of the Old School” by Cecilia Payne-Gaposchkin, a fellow Women Astronomical Computers member that discovered the chemical composition of stars and pointed out the abundancy of hydrogen and helium atoms in them.

== See also ==
- Harvard College Observatory
- Harvard Computers
- Henry Draper Catalogue
