= Williamina Fleming =

Scottish astronomer (1857–1911)

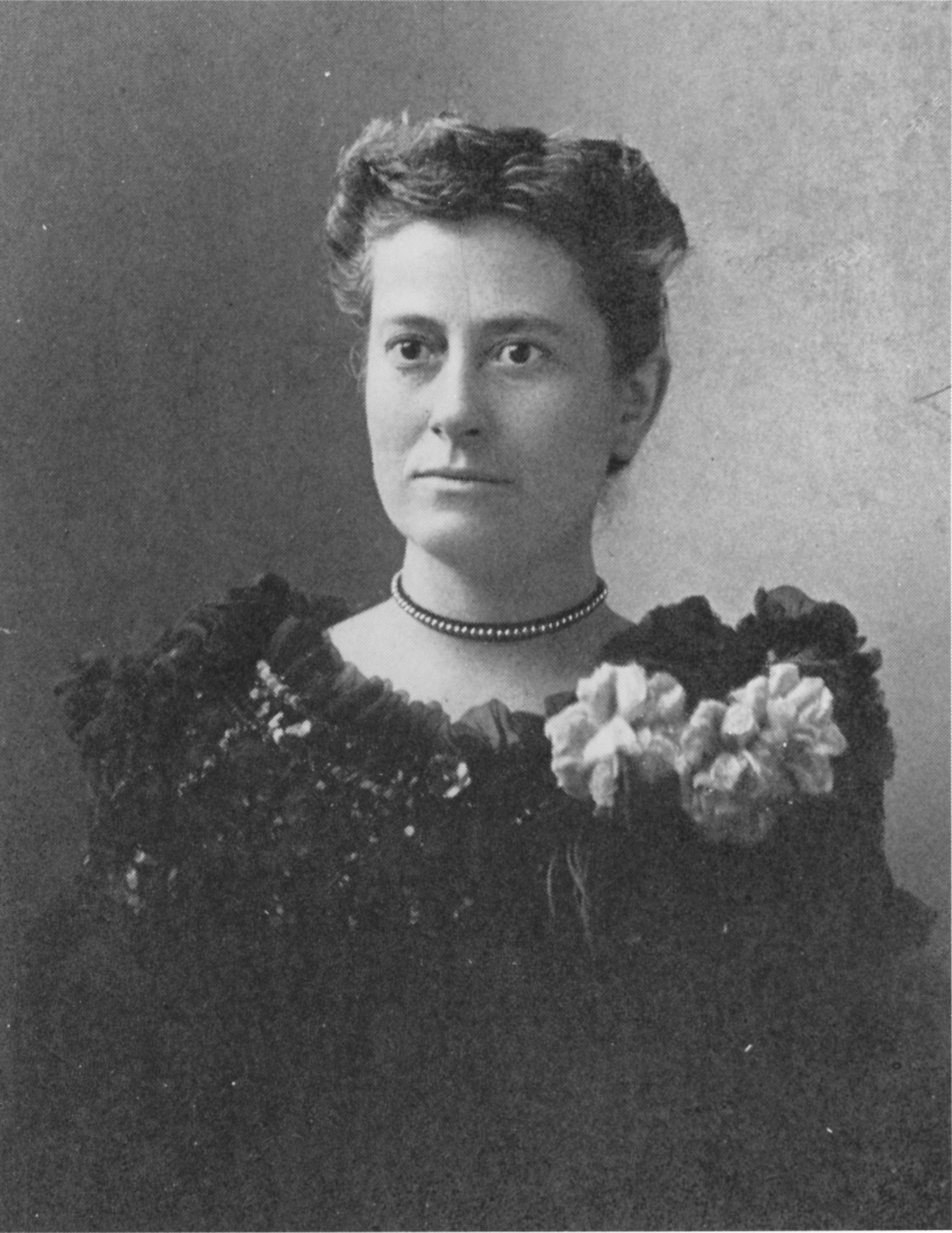
- Fleming, c. 1890s
- Born: Williamina Paton Stevens; 15 May 1857; Dundee, Scotland
- Died: 21 May 1911 (aged 54); Boston, Massachusetts, United States
- Education: None
- Scientific career
- Fields: Astronomy
- Workplaces: Harvard College Observatory

Williamina Paton Stevens Fleming (15 May 1857 – 21 May 1911) was an American astronomer, born in Scotland At the Harvard College Observatory, she contributed to the photographic classification of stellar spectra, helping to develop a common designation system for stars that is used to this day. Fleming cataloged more than ten thousand stars, 59 gaseous nebulae, over 310 variable stars, and 10 novae, among other astronomical phenomena. She is credited with the discovery of the Horsehead Nebula in 1888, and she was a vocal supporter of women's representation in her field.

== Early life ==
Williamina Paton Stevens was born in Dundee, Scotland, at 86 Nethergate, on 15 May 1857 to Mary Walker and Robert Stevens, a carver and gilder. She was one of six children. Her younger sister, Johanna Stevens, would also later work at Harvard College Observatory. Starting at the age of fourteen, she went to work as a pupil-teacher. In 1877, she married James Orr Fleming, an accountant and widower, also of Dundee. The couple had one son, Edward P. Fleming.

== Career ==
In 1878, aged 21, she and her husband emigrated to Boston, Massachusetts, US. After her husband abandoned her and their young son, she worked as a maid in the home of Professor Edward Charles Pickering, the director of the Harvard College Observatory (HCO). Pickering's wife Elizabeth recommended Williamina as having talents beyond custodial and maternal arts, and in 1879, Pickering hired Fleming to conduct part-time administrative work at the observatory.

In 1881, Pickering formally invited Fleming to join the HCO and taught her how to analyze stellar spectra. She became one of the founding members of the Harvard Computers, an all-women cadre of human computers hired by Pickering to compute mathematical classifications and edit the observatory's publications.

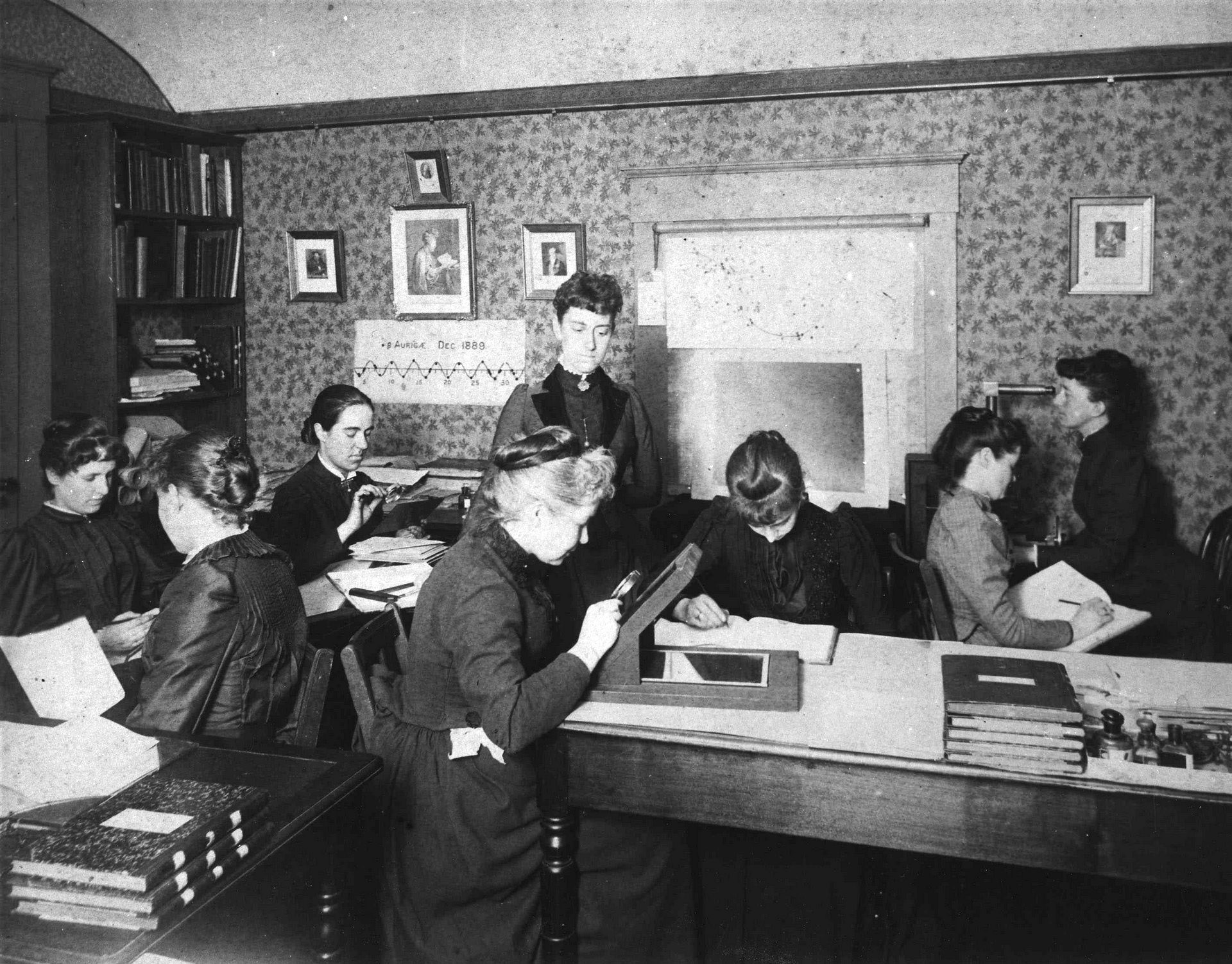
The Harvard Computers, the group of women computers at the Harvard College Observatory, who worked for the astronomer Edward Charles Pickering. The group included Harvard computer and astronomer Henrietta Swan Leavitt, Annie Jump Cannon, Williamina Fleming, and Antonia Maury.

=== Henry Draper Catalogue, 1886 ===
In 1886, Mary Anna Draper, the wealthy widow of astronomer Henry Draper, started the Henry Draper Memorial to fund the HCO's research. In response, the HCO began work on the first Henry Draper Catalogue, a long-term project to obtain the optical spectra of as many stars as possible and to index and classify stars by spectra.

Fleming was placed in charge of the Draper Catalogue project. A disagreement soon developed regarding classifying the stars. The analysis had been started by Nettie Farrar, but she left a few months later to be married. Antonia Maury advocated for a complex classification scheme. Fleming, however, wanted a much more simple, straightforward approach.

The latest Harvard College Observatory images contained photographed spectra of stars that extended into the ultraviolet range, which allowed much more accurate classifications than recording spectra by hand through an instrument at night. Fleming devised a system for classifying stars according to the relative amount of hydrogen observed in their spectra, known as the Pickering-Fleming system. Stars showing hydrogen as the most abundant element were classified A; those of hydrogen as the second-most abundant element, B; and so on.

Later, her colleague Annie Jump Cannon reordered the classification system based on the surface temperature of stars, resulting in the Harvard spectral classification, which is still in use today.

In 1890, the HCO published the first Henry Draper Catalogue due to years of work by their female computer team, a catalog with more than 10,000 stars classified according to their spectrum. Fleming did the majority of these classifications. Fleming also made it possible to go back and compare recorded plates by organizing thousands of photographs by telescope along with other identifying factors. In 1898, she was appointed Curator of Astronomical Photographs at Harvard, the first woman to hold the position.

At the 1893 World's Fair in Chicago, Fleming openly advocated for other women in the sciences in her talk "A Field for Woman's Work in Astronomy", where she openly promoted hiring female assistants in astronomy. Her speech suggested she agreed with the prevailing idea that women were inferior but felt that, if given more significant opportunities, they would be able to become equals; in other words, the sex differences in this regard were more culturally constructed than biologically grounded.

=== Notable discoveries ===
During her career, Fleming discovered a total of 59 gaseous nebulae, over 310 variable stars, and 10 novae. This includes the Horsehead Nebula and V Persei.

Fleming, center right, at the Fourth Conference International Union for Cooperation in Solar Research at Mount Wilson Observatory, 1910

In 1888, Fleming discovered the Horsehead Nebula on a telescope-photogrammetry plate made by astronomer W. H. Pickering, brother of E.C. Pickering. She described the bright nebula (later known as IC 434) as having "a semicircular indentation 5 minutes in diameter 30 minutes south of Zeta Orionis". Subsequent professional publications neglected to give credit to Fleming for the discovery. The first Dreyer Index Catalogue omitted Fleming's name from the list of contributors, having then discovered sky objects at Harvard, attributing the entire work merely to "Pickering". However, by the time the second Dreyer Index Catalogue was published in 1908, Fleming and her female colleagues at the HCO were sufficiently well-known and received proper credit for their discoveries.

Fleming is also credited with the discovery of the first white dwarf:

The first person who knew of the existence of white dwarfs was Mrs. Fleming; the next two, an hour or two later, Professor E. C. Pickering and I. With characteristic generosity, Pickering had volunteered to have the spectra of the stars which I had observed for parallax looked up on the Harvard plates. All those of faint absolute magnitude turned out to be of class G or later. Moved with curiosity I asked him about the companion of 40 Eridani. Characteristically, again, he telephoned to Mrs. Fleming who reported within an hour or so, that it was of Class A.

— Henry Norris Russell

In 1910, Fleming published her discovery of white dwarf stars. Her other notable publications include A Photographic Study of Variable Stars (1907), a list of 222 variable stars she had discovered; and Spectra and Photographic Magnitudes of Stars in Standard Regions (1911).

She became a US citizen in 1907.

She died of pneumonia in Boston on 21 May 1911, aged 54.

== Honors ==
- Member of the Astronomical and Astrophysical Society of America and the Astronomical Society of France
- Honorary member of the Royal Astronomical Society of London in 1906, the first American woman to be elected
- Guadalupe Almendaro Medal by the Astronomical Society of Mexico for her discovery of new stars
- Honorary fellow in astronomy of Wellesley College
- Commemorated on the Dundee Women's Trail

== Legacy ==
- The Fleming lunar crater was jointly named after her and (not closely related) Alexander Fleming
- The asteroid 5747 Williamina is named after her.
- Kathryn Lasky published a book in 2021 about Fleming illustrated by Julianna Swaney called "She Caught the Light: Williamina Stevens Fleming: Astronomer" aimed at young people.

In 2015, Lindsay Smith Zrull, curator of Harvard's Plate Stacks collection, was working to catalog and digitize the astronomical plates for Digital Access to a Sky Century @ Harvard (DASCH) and discovered about 118 boxes, each containing 20 to 30 notebooks, from women computers and early Harvard astronomers. Smith Zrull realized that the 2,500+ volumes were outside the scope of her work with DASCH but wanted to see the material preserved and made accessible. Smith Zrull contacted librarians at the Harvard–Smithsonian Center for Astrophysics.

In response, the Wolbach Library launched Project PHaEDRA (Preserving Harvard's Early Data and Research in Astronomy). Daina Bouquin, Wolbach's Head Librarian, explained that the objective is to enable full-text search of the research: "If you search for Williamina Fleming, you're not going to just find a mention of her in a publication where she wasn't the author of her work. You're going to find her work."

In July 2017, the Wolbach Library at the Center for Astrophysics | Harvard & Smithsonian unveiled a display showcasing Fleming's work, including the log book containing the Horsehead Nebula discovery. The library has dozens of volumes of Fleming's work in its PHaEDRA collection.

As of August 2017, about 200 of over 2,500 volumes had been transcribed. The task is expected to take years to complete fully. Some of the notebooks are listed via the Smithsonian Digital Volunteers Web site, which encourages volunteers to transcribe them.
