= Harvard College Observatory =

Astronomical observatory in Cambridge, Massachusetts, United States

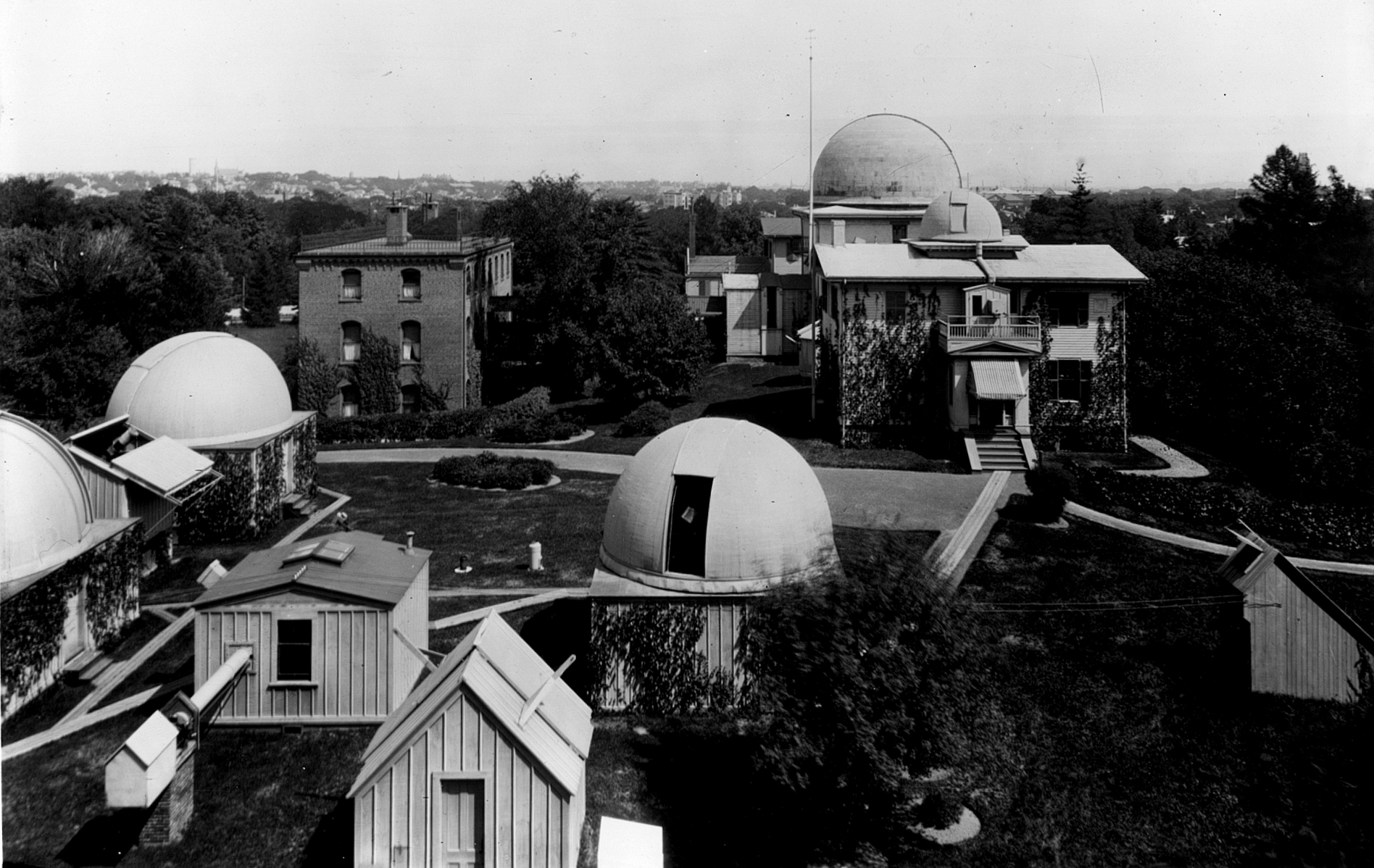
- Harvard College Observatory, circa 1899
- Alternative names: HCO
- Organization: Harvard University
- Observatory code: 802
- Location: Cambridge, Massachusetts, US
- Coordinates: 42°22′53″N 71°07′42″W
- Altitude: 24 m (79 ft)
- Established: 1839
- Website: www.cfa.harvard.edu/hco
- Telescopes: Harvard Great Refractor
- Location of Harvard College Observatory
- Related media on Commons

The Harvard College Observatory (HCO) is an institution managing a complex of buildings and multiple instruments used for astronomical research by the Harvard University Department of Astronomy. It is located in Cambridge, Massachusetts, United States, and was founded in 1839. With the Smithsonian Astrophysical Observatory, it forms part of the Center for Astrophysics | Harvard & Smithsonian.

HCO houses the Harvard Plate Stacks, a collection of approximately 600,000 astronomical plates taken between the mid-1880s and 1989 (with a gap from 1953–1968). This 100-year coverage is a unique resource for studying temporal variations in the universe. The Digital Access to a Sky Century @ Harvard project scanned and 429,274 direct image plates, leaving nearly 200,000 spectra and other photographic plates yet to be digitized. In 2024, a new database, StarGlass, was created to combine the scientific data from the plates with the Plate Stack's archival holdings.

== History ==
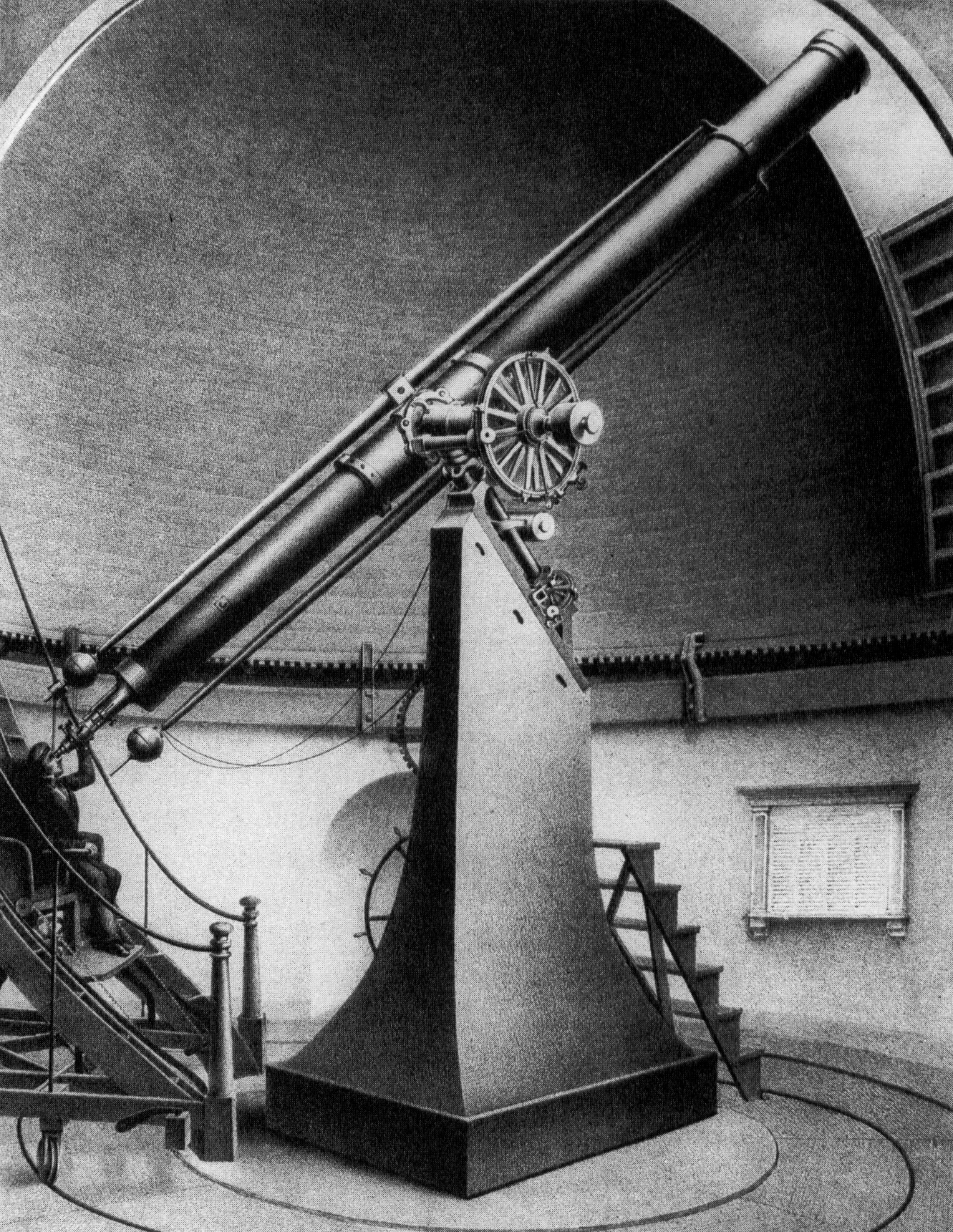
Sketch of Harvard's Great Refractor telescope

In 1839, the Harvard Corporation voted to appoint William Cranch Bond, a prominent Boston clockmaker, as "Astronomical Observer to the University" (at no salary). This marked the founding of the Harvard College Observatory. HCO's first telescope, the 15-inch Great Refractor, was installed in 1847. That telescope was the largest in the United States from installation until 1867.

Between 1847 and 1852, Bond and pioneer photographer John Adams Whipple used the Great Refractor telescope to produce images of the moon that are remarkable in their clarity of detail and aesthetic power. This was the largest telescope in North America at that time, and their images of the moon took the prize for technical excellence in photography at the 1851 Great Exhibition at The Crystal Palace in London. On the night of July 16–17, 1850, Whipple and Bond made the first daguerreotype of a star (Vega).

Harvard College Observatory is historically important to astronomy, as many women including Annie Jump Cannon, Henrietta Swan Leavitt, Cecilia Payne-Gaposchkin, Williamina Fleming, and Florence Cushman performed pivotal stellar classification research. Cannon, Leavitt and Cushman were hired initially as "computers" to perform calculations and examine stellar photographs, but later made insightful connections in their research.

== Publications ==
From 1898 to 1926, a series of Bulletins were issued containing many of the major discoveries of the period. These were then replaced by Announcement Cards which continued to be issued until 1952.

In 1908, the observatory published the Harvard Revised Photometry Catalogue, which gave rise to the HR star catalogue, now maintained by the Yale University Observatory as the Bright Star Catalogue.

== Directors ==
- William Cranch Bond 1839–1859
- George Phillips Bond 1859–1865
- Joseph Winlock 1866–1875
- Edward Charles Pickering 1877–1919
- Solon Irving Bailey 1919–1921 (Acting Director)
- Harlow Shapley 1921–1952
- Donald H. Menzel 1952–1953 (Acting Director); 1954–1966 (Director)
- Leo Goldberg 1966–1970
- Fred Whipple 1955-1973
- George B. Field 1973-1982 (founding director of the Center for Astrophysics | Harvard & Smithsonian)
- Irwin Shapiro 1983–2004
- Charles Alcock 2004–2022
- Lisa Kewley 2022–present

== See also ==
- Harvard Computers
- Sears Tower – Harvard Observatory
- The Minor Planet Center credits many asteroid discoveries to "Harvard Observatory."
- See List of largest optical refracting telescopes, for other 'great refractors'
