= Oneonta =

Oneonta may refer to several places:

== Communities ==
- Oneonta, New York, a small city and inspiration for some of the other "Oneontas"
- Oneonta (town), New York, a town that surrounds the City of Oneonta
- Oneonta, Alabama, Blount County
- Oneonta, Kentucky, a location southeast of Cincinnati, Ohio
- Oneonta, California, or Oneonta Beach, now part of Imperial Beach, California

== Geographic locations ==
- Oneonta Beach, on the island of Oahu, Hawaii
- Oneonta Creek, a river in Otsego County, New York
- Oneonta Gorge, in Oregon, containing Oneonta Falls, in the Columbia River Gorge
- Oneonta Lake, in Marinette County, Wisconsin

== Schools ==
- State University of New York at Oneonta in Oneonta, New York

== See also ==
- Oneonta (sidewheeler), a steamboat on the Columbia River
