= Lower Reservoir =

- Location of Lower Reservoir within New York State
- Location: Otsego County, New York
- Coordinates: 42°28′51″N 75°02′52″W
- Type: Reservoir
- Primary inflows: Oneonta Creek
- Primary outflows: Oneonta Creek
- Basin countries: United States
- Max. length: 1,045 ft (319 m)
- Max. width: 275 ft (84 m)
- Surface area: 6 acres (2.4 ha)
- Surface elevation: 1,289 ft (393 m)
- Settlements: Oneonta

Oneonta's Lower Reservoir is a small 5.3-acre reservoir in Otsego County, New York, located north of the City of Oneonta. It is the source of municipal water for the City of Oneonta and parts of the Town of Oneonta. The Lower Reservoir drains south via Oneonta Creek, which flows into the Susquehanna River.

From the city's Upper Reservoir (Wilber Lake) water flows downhill via Oneonta Creek to the Lower Reservoir, then is pumped to the Catella Park Well or directly to the Oneonta Water Treatment Plant.
