= Harvard Plate Stacks =

Collection of astronomical glass negatives

The Harvard Plate Stacks
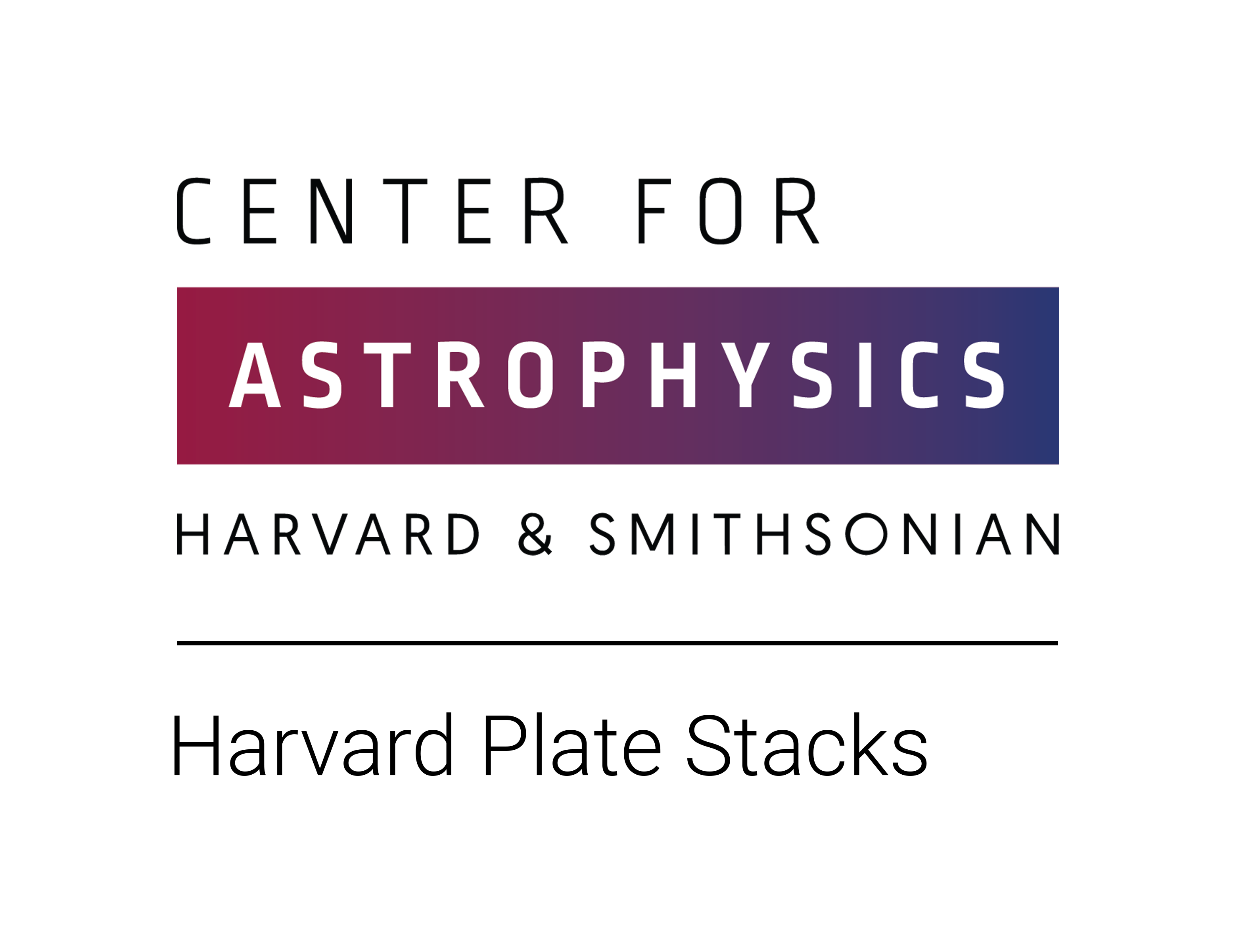
- Mission statement: "to serve as a beacon of knowledge, preservation, and inclusivity, ensuring that the legacy of astrophotography and the pioneering women behind it continue to shine brightly for generations to come"
- Commercial?: No
- Type of project: Educational research center and historic archival collection
- Location: Cambridge, Massachusetts
- Owner: Harvard College Observatory a member of The Center for Astrophysics | Harvard & Smithsonian
- Founder: Mary Anna Draper and Edward Charles Pickering
- Established: 1880s
- Website: platestacks.cfa.harvard.edu

The Harvard Plate Stacks, previously known as the Harvard College Observatory glass plate collection or the astronomical photographic glass plate collection, is a collection of astronomical glass plate negatives at the Center for Astrophysics | Harvard & Smithsonian in Cambridge, Massachusetts. Created over more than a century by the Harvard College Observatory, it is widely described as the largest collection of astronomical glass plates in the world.

The collection includes more than 550,000 glass plate negatives dating from the 1870s to the late 1990s, as well as early photographic data from as early as 1849, and logbooks, notebooks, and photographic prints associated with astronomical research at Harvard and affiliated observatories. It is one of the largest photographic collections at Harvard. Many of the astronomers, assistants, and computers who worked with the collection were women, including members of the group now commonly known as the Women Astronomical Computers.

== Scope and Size ==
The Harvard Plate Stacks collection consists of over 550,000 glass plate negatives of the night sky. The glass alone is estimated to weigh over 165 tons and stored across three floors of a purpose-built building on Observatory Hill in Cambridge, Massachusetts. The majority of the collection consists of the astronomical glass plates negatives, with most of these being gelatin dry-plate negatives.

Astronomically, the collection consists of both direct image and spectral plates, with two-thirds of the collection made up of the latter. The collection is also mostly known for its widefield imagery and consists of 20% of the known plates ever taken. The glass plates negatives date from the 1870s to the late 1990s. Any given region of the night sky appears on between 500 and 1,000 plates across a century of time. Both in number of observations and time, the collection will not be surpassed by digitally collected data until projects like the LSST at the Vera Rubin Observatory complete hundreds of observations and until a century of digital CCD imaging in the 2080s.

Photographically, the collection spans the history of the analogue photography. While the majority of the collection is photographic negatives, there is a large collection of photographic prints across the same century of time.

Archivally, the collection consists of materials like the 2,500 individual notebooks of researchers who were hired to study the plates. These notebooks include those made by some of the most famous astronomers at the Harvard College Observatory including, Williamina Fleming, Antonia Maury, Henrietta Swan Leavitt, Annie Jump Cannon, and Cecilia Payne-Gaposchkin. The Harvard Plate Stacks also hold 1,200 logbooks that record the metadata of each plate, including the time it was created and the observer who made the image.

== Earliest parts of the collection ==
The collection starts at the dawn of photography with some of the earliest images created of objects in space. These include an early collection of daguerreotypes, including a collection made by photographer John Adams Whipple collaborating with father-son astronomers William Cranch Bond and George Bond. The oldest dated image in the collection is a multiple exposure daguerreotype of the moon made by Samuel Dwight Humphrey on 1 September 1849. This is the second oldest extant image of the moon known to survive, only surpassed by the John William Draper's photograph of the moon now at the New York University Libraries Special Collections.

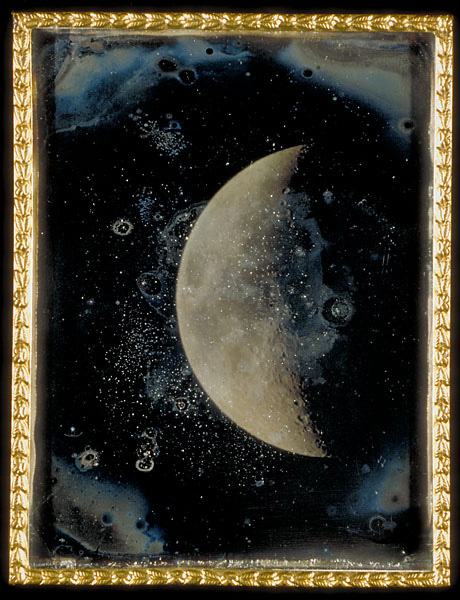
View of the Moon by John Adams Whipple 1852

Photographic firsts contained in the collection include the first photograph of an eclipse (partial) created by Whipple on 28 July 1851 and the first photograph showing the "diamond ring" effect of a total solar eclipse by Whipple in Shelbyville, Kentucky on 7 August 1869. It also includes the first photograph made of a comet made by William Usherwood of the Comet Donati on 27 September 1858, and subsequent exposures made by George Bond on 28 September 1858.

While scientifically, photographically, and artistically significant, these earliest photographs were not created consistently. Instead These earliest examples of photography that include daguerreotypes, ambrotypes, wet plate collodion, and salt prints are photographic processes that require more light through longer exposure times than these media would allow to capture all but the brightest objects in the night sky. It was not until the invention of the dry plate negatives as a commercially available medium that the exposure length was no longer limited.

== Anna Palmer Draper, Edward Pickering and the Harvard Computers ==
Following the American Civil War, advances in photography and astronomy allowed for multiple pioneers to make advances in the burgeoning art and science of astrophotography. The British couple, Margaret Lindsay Huggins and William Huggins, would be credited with being the first to experiment using dry plate photography to capture astronomical objects in 1876. At the same time, the American couple, Anna Palmer Draper and Henry Draper, had been experimenting with photography, spectroscopy, and astronomy in their personal observatory in Hastings-on-Hudson, New York. The Drapers would be the first to successfully photograph a spectrum of a star, Vega, in 1872 and be the first to capture the Orion Nebula on September 30, 1880, all with collodion photography. In Massachusetts, the brothers William H. and Edward C. Pickering, would experiment with lenses and start systematically photographing the night sky by 1877. These three pairs of collaborators would exchange correspondences and share discoveries and advancements.

On November 20, 1882, Henry Draper dies of "pleurisy" after returning home to New York from a hunting trip in Colorado. In a letter from Edward Pickering to Anna Palmer Draper dated 13 January 1883, he writes,

"My dear Mrs. Draper, Mr. Clark tells me that you are preparing to complete the work in which Dr. Draper was engaged, and my interest in this matter must be my excuse for addressing you regarding it. I need not state my satisfaction that you are taking this step, since it must be obvious that in no other way could you erect so lasting a monument to his memory."

This would be the beginning of Anna Draper being the single largest benefactor to the Harvard College Observatory for the next three decades. Her funds and future endowment would back the creation, preservation, and housing of nearly 6000,000 glass plates and the core of the Harvard Plate Stacks collection, which would amount to a century of photographing the night sky. Her gift would not only include funds but also her and her husband's personal telescope. She would establish the Henry Draper Memorial, which would include both the creation of a physical photographic plate collection, as well as the study and publication of what is known as the Henry Draper Catalogue. Over 44 women would partake in the study, writing, and creation of the catalogue from 1886 until the final publication of Henry Draper Extension Charts in 1941. This would be part of the group of women known as the Harvard Computers or, more recently, referred to as the Women Astronomical Computers at Harvard. Nearly 200 women would work at the Harvard Plate Stacks during the century of the use of glass plate negatives, 1875–1975. Their individual and collective legacies shaped the way we understand the Universe.

These impacts on said institution and field would be summarized nearly a century later by female astrophysicist, Dr. Dorrit Hoffleit, “there is hardly any branch of astronomy that has not benefited from the results of the Henry Draper Memorial. Without Mrs. Draper's vision and generosity, one wonders how preeminent Harvard would have become.” Draper would also provide funds for the observatory to build three different buildings to house the Harvard Plate Stacks including its current home built in 1931. She would also separately establish the Henry Draper Medal, be a founder of the Mount Wilson Observatory, and establishing the Draper Collection of Cuneiform at the New York Public Library.

This individual support would be compounded by other donations, including the estate of Uriah A. Boyden to establish a Southern Hemisphere Observatory, first called Boyden Station, and later Boyden Observatory. Originally stablished in Arequipa, Peru in 1889, the Observatory would be moved to Maselspoort near Bloemfontein, South Africa where it still exists and operates under the Physics Department of the University of the Free State (UFS) since 1976.

Over 60% of the Plate Stacks collection would be made at these two locations. Uniquely among other astronomical glass plate collections, the Harvard Plate Stacks has an equal length history and even use of the same instruments to create plates of the northern and southern celestial hemispheres. This would lead to the creation of the "Harvard Map of the Sky" in 1917, the first photographic image of the entire visible universe. Printed on glass plate negatives from original plates deemed to be the best of each quadrant of the night sky, 55 glass plate negatives, which would later be expanded to 74 plates, would be copied using an interpositive process to create multiple copies of glass plate negatives for sale and distribution to other observatories, universities, and libraries. The first sets were offered around 1905 along with the "First Supplement to Catalogue of Variable Stars." According to Williamina Fleming's own published account, by October 1890, Harvard had photographed both the northern and southern hemispheres from Cambridge, MA and an earlier predecessor of the Boyden Observatory established on Mount Harvard near Chosica, Peru. This means that both the Harvard Plate Stacks contain the first photographic atlas of the visible universe, and even predates the much more well-known international collaboration and multidecade publication, Carte du Ciel. The scale and volume of creating photographic plates would go largely unchanged with only minor pauses or lower production during the two world wars.

Other major donations for women would help shape the collection and advance the fields of Astronomy and astrophysics. Catherine Wolfe Bruce would fund the creation of a 24-in doublet telescope honoring her husband. This telescope would first be installed in Massachusetts to capture the northernmost stars, then moved to a purpose-built building at Boyden in Arequipa as its centerpiece. The Bruce telescope was the largest Astrograph at the time and would be used to create 30,000 glass plates. These plates, known as the A series, are the largest, measuring 14x17 inches, and are some of the farthest seeing plates in the collection.

The Boyden Observatory was moved South Africa, enabled by a grant of $200,000 from the Rockefeller Foundation. Abby Aldrich Rockefeller funded the creation of a 60-in telescope.

== The Menzel Gap ==
In 1952, Donald Howard Menzel was appointed the director of the Harvard College Observatory. According to Dorrit Hoffleit, one of the first things he undertook in his new appointment was the systematic shuttering of the photographic program at Harvard. This included abandoning the Boyden Observatory, and the culling of thousands of plates from 1960-1965 through the creation of a Plate Stacks committee that excluded the voices of the curator of the collection, as well as those employed at the time as computers. This committee would meet and vote to destroy whole series of plates including experimental plates and early spectra plates. Because of Harvard's outsized role in the creation of astronomical glass plates even in this era, the resulting gap in astronomical data from the 1950s to the 1960s is referred to as the "Menzel Gap" by modern astrophysicists.

=== Armagh-Dunsink-Harvard telescope ===
In 1947 through a chance meeting in the Shannon Airport with Harvard College Observatory director, Harlow Shapley, and Irish President (Taoiseach), Éamon de Valera led to the idea and further creation of the Armagh-Dunsink-Harvard telescope. Although installed and housed at Harvard's Boyden Observatory in South Africa, this was a joint endeavor with the Armagh Observatory in Northern Ireland, the Republic of Ireland, and the Harvard College Observatory. This was one of the earlier examples of Space diplomacy that would be spearheaded at Harvard by astronomer Bart Bok. The director of the Armagh Observatory at the time was Eric Lindsay, who not only got his PhD from Harvard in 1934, but he would meet and later marry Women Astronomical Computer, Sylvia Mussells (Sister to fellow astronomer and Harvard Plate Stacks employee Muriel Mussells Seyfert). De Valera recently pushed to create the Dublin Institute for Advanced Studies and its subsequent purchase of the Dunsink Observatory after Trinity College Dublin had ceased its operations a few years earlier. This cooperative agreement would be one of the rare instances where these two governments would regularly work together. The telescope was a 36—32 Baker-Schmidt telescope that received first light in October 1950. This telescope would make circular photographic plates from 1950 to 1963. The telescope would create 7,087 glass plate negatives focusing on nebulae and clusters. The majority of these plates are still house at the Plate Stacks but some plates where known to be a Dunsink Observatory in 1995 and a small deposit of plates from this telescope was sent to PARI in 2007.

=== Damons ===
Starting in 1961, the Harvard College Observatory would undertake its last multidecade analogue photographic survey of the night sky. First starting at Harvard's Oak Ridge Observatory in Harvard, MA, then moving to Boyden in South Africa, and later Mt. John in New Zealand, and Cerro Tololo would be the site of three "patrol cameras" which were 13.9 in telescope that systematically photographed the night sky using three filters (red, yellow, blue) concurrently. This would result in the creation of 12,374 glass plate negatives covering the entire sky from 1961 to 1990. Though these 8 x 10 plates capture a wide field of view, the advances in dry plate photography allowed for the capturing of the faintest objects captured on plates in the collection.

=== Subsequent additions ===
In addition to the plates and different campaigns made by the Harvard College Observatory, there are other smaller but important additions to the collection of materials made by other departments at the Center for Astrophysics or other observatories.

The Meteor Department at the Center for Astrophysics was first a part of the Harvard College Observatory but when Fred Whipple was named director of the Smithsonian Astrophysical Observatory, he moved the department over to the Smithsonian so it could continue under his leadership. This group would create thousands of glass plate negatives as well as film exposures of the night sky, ranging in scale and scope over time. Before this department transitioned into its current iteration as the Minor Planet Center, its analogue holdings were transferred over to the Harvard Plate Stacks. This would be the most significant addition to the collection in its history, numbering near 100,000 items. During the physical reorganization of the collection space, as well as the priorities put onto the collection during the DASCH Project, the lion's share of these materials were deposited at PARI. Until both institutions complete an inventory of the collections they hold, the number of surviving items is unknown.

Also in relation to the DASCH Project, the Space Telescope Science Institute transferred its holdings of various later analogue sky surveys that were digitized as part of the Digitized Sky Survey. These include the National Geographic Society – Palomar Observatory Sky Survey, European Southern Observatory SRO Sky Surveys, and the UK Schmidt Telescope Southern Survey. As of 2025, these plates are being scanned by the DASCH scanner, though at a slower rate.

== DASCH ==
The Digital Access to a Sky Century @ Harvard (DASCH) was a project that started in 2001 with the intent of digitizing the glass plates in the plate collection as well as the metadata from the logbooks that supported these plates. The final data release in 2024 contained data for 429,274 glass plates, making them accessible to the public for viewing.

On December 29, 2024, DASCH's successor, StarGlass, was launched. StarGlass is hosted on the cloud and is publicly available for anyone to view, allowing searches to be done for plates worked on by a specific astronomer, plates that show specific celestial objects, and much more.

== Notable people ==
- Williamina Fleming—First curator of the collection and head of the department from ca. 1879 to 1911.
- Antonia Maury—Niece of Anna Draper and builds on Fleming's stellar classification
- Henrietta Swan Leavitt—Discovers the period–luminosity relation of cephids on plates of the Large and Small Magellanic Clouds, now known at the Leavitt law.
- Annie Jump Cannon—Editor of the Draper Catalogue and named second curator 1911 but does not receive the official appointment until 1938 and retires in 1940.
- Cecilia Payne-Gaposchkin—First PhD in astronomy awarded by Radcliffe or Harvard, where she discovered that stars are made up of hydrogen and helium by analyzing spectra plates from the Draper telescope in 1925. Would be rehired as a computer assigned to Leavitt's work on the Harvard Standard Regions when she returned in 1934.

Also:

- Mary B. Howe Baker
- Priscilla Fairfield Bok
- Agnes Mary Hoovens Brooks
- A. Grace Cook
- Florence Cushman
- Elsa van Dien
- Mabel Abbie Gill
- Edith Frances Gill
- Margaret Harwood
- Dorrit Hoffleit
- Helen Sawyer Hogg
- Lillian L. Hodgdon
- Florence Shirley Patterson Jones
- Edith Jones Woodward
- Evelyn Leland
- Margaret Mayall
- Paris Pişmiş
- Martha Betz Shapley
- Muriel Mussells Seyfert
- Henrietta Hill Swope
- Mary Watson Whitney
- Sarah Frances Whiting
- Louisa Winlock
- Anna Winlock
- Frances Woodworth Wright
- Emma Vyssotsky
- Anne Sewell Young
