= Triple =

Triple is used in several contexts to mean "threefold" or a "treble":

== Sports ==
- Triple (baseball), a three-base hit
- A basketball three-point field goal
- A figure skating jump with three rotations
- In bowling terms, three strikes in a row
- In cycling, a crankset with three chainrings

== Places ==
- Triple Islands, an uninhabited island group in Nunavut, Canada
- Triple Island, British Columbia, Canada
- Triple Falls (disambiguation), four waterfalls in the United States & Canada
- Triple Glaciers, in Grand Teton National Park, Wyoming
- Triple Crossing, Richmond, Virginia, believed to be the only place in North America where three Class I railroads cross
- Triple Bridge, a stone arch bridge in Ljubljana, Slovenia

== Transportation ==
- Kawasaki triple, a Japanese motorcycle produced between 1969 and 1980
- Triumph Triple, a motorcycle engine from Triumph Motorcycles Ltd
- A straight-three engine
- A semi-truck with three trailers

== Science and technology ==
- Triple (mathematics) (3-tuple), a list or sequence with three elements
- Triple (category theory), a construction in algebraic topology, now usually called a monad
- Semantic triple, the atomic data entity in the Resource Description Framework (RDF)

== Religion ==
- Triple deity, a deity who appears in three forms
  - Triple goddess (Neopaganism), a divine female figure revered in Neopagan traditions

== Other uses ==
- Triple (novel), by Ken Follett
- Triples (web series), a 2020 Indian web series
- Triples (cereal), a breakfast cereal made by General Mills in the 1990s
- A method of change ringing of bells
- TripleS (group), South Korean girl group

== See also ==
- Triple point, in thermodynamics, the temperature and pressure at which three states of matter can co-exist
- Triple jump, a track and field event
- Triple metre, a musical metre characterized by a primary division of three beats to the bar
- Triple H, American professional wrestler
- Comic triple
- Treble (disambiguation)
- Triplet (disambiguation)
- Tripel, a style of beer
