= Treble =

Treble may refer to:

== Music ==
- Treble (sound), tones of high frequency or range, the counterpart of bass
- Treble voice, a choirboy or choirgirl singing in the soprano range
- Treble clef, a symbol used to indicate the pitch of written notes
- Treble (musical group), a three-piece girl group from the Netherlands
- Treble, in change ringing, the bell with the highest pitch
- Treble, another name for the alto recorder musical instrument
- Treble, a 2024 album by MC Cheung

== Sports ==
- Treble (association football), winning three top-tier trophies in one season
- Treble (rugby league), in British competition, winning all three available domestic titles in one season

== Other uses ==
- Treble (Mega Man), a character in the Mega Man video game series
- Treble (Unbeatable), a character in the video game Unbeatable
- Treble, a crochet stitch
- Treble, a type of bet covering three selections
- Project Treble, an Android feature to separate system and vendor for faster system update roll-up

== See also ==
- Triple (disambiguation)
- Triple Crown (disambiguation)
