= Carleton Watkins =

American photographer (1829–1916)

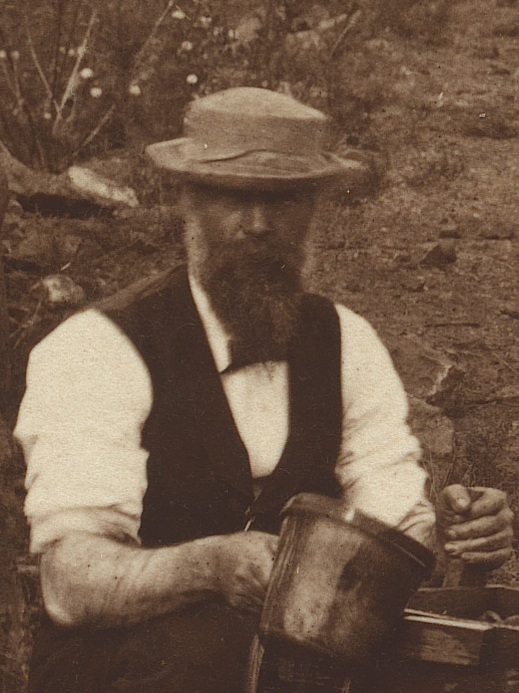
- Watkins in 1883
- Born: November 11, 1829; Oneonta, New York, U.S.
- Died: 1916 (aged c. 86); Napa, California, U.S.
- Style: Photography, landscape photography
- Spouse: Frances Sneed

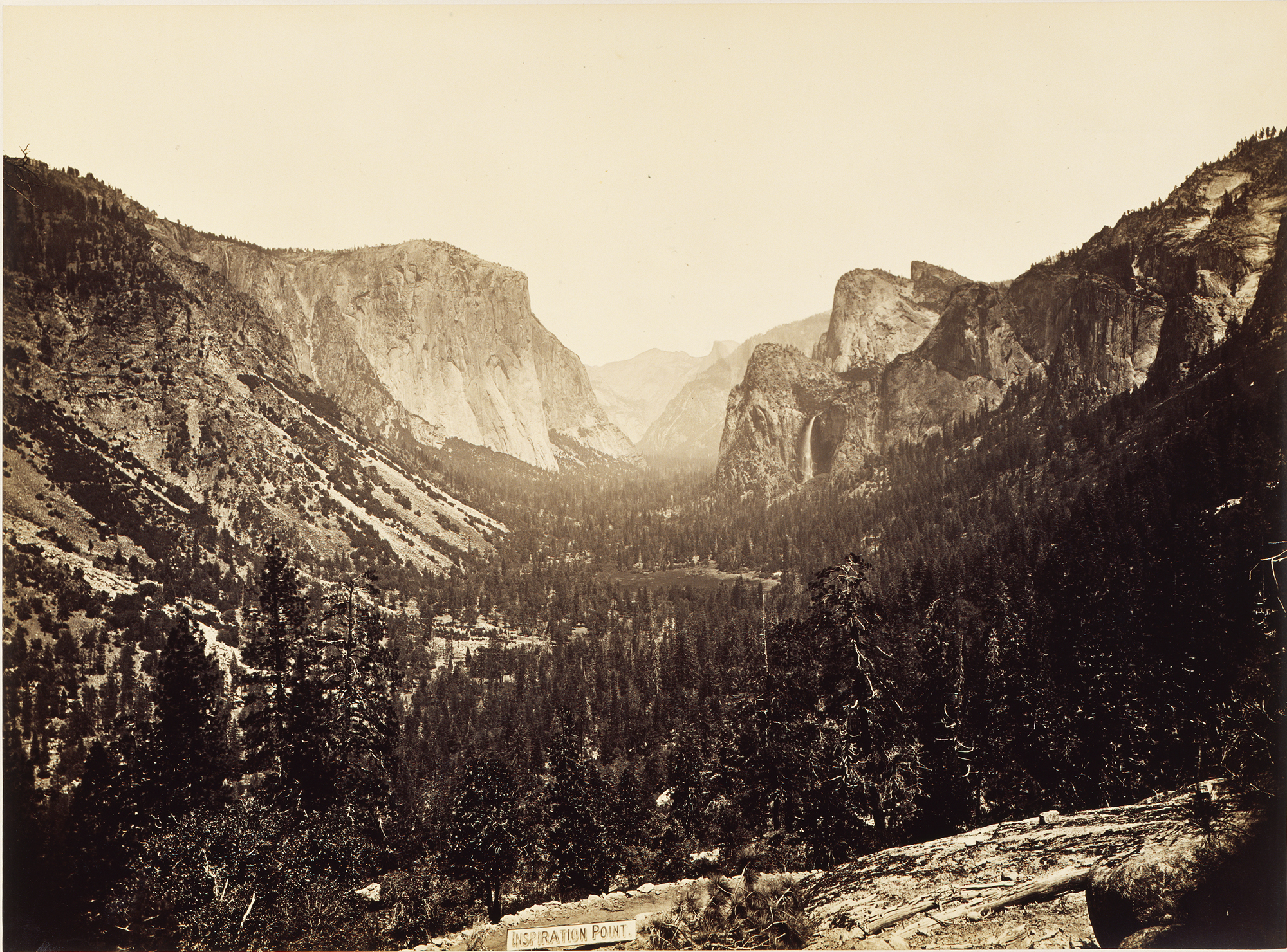
Yosemite Valley, View from Inspiration Point, 1879, in the Princeton University Art Museum

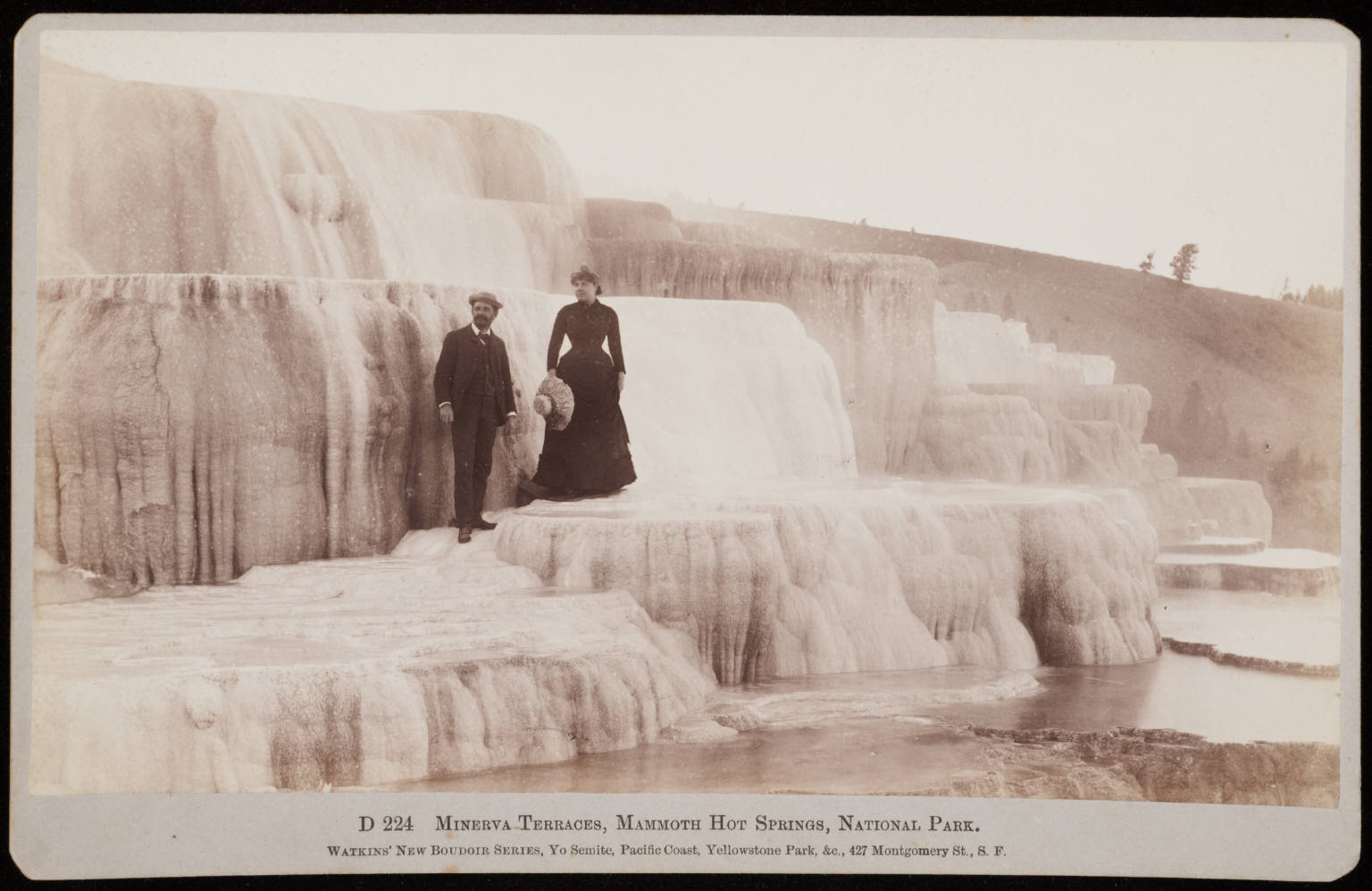
Minerva Terraces, Mammoth Hot Springs, National Park, by Watkins

Carleton E. Watkins (1829–1916) was an American photographer of the 19th century. Born in New York, he moved to California and quickly became interested in photography. He focused mainly on landscape photography, and Yosemite Valley was a favorite subject of his. His photographs of the valley significantly influenced the United States Congress' decision to preserve it as a National Park.

== Early life ==
=== Birth ===
Carleton E. Watkins was born on November 11, 1829, the eldest of eight children. His parents were John and Julia Watkins, a carpenter and an innkeeper. Born in Oneonta, New York, he was a hunter and fisherman and was involved in the glee club and Presbyterian Church Choir. His true middle name is the subject of debate: some sources give it as Eugene while others give it as Emmons.

=== San Francisco ===
In 1851, Watkins and his childhood friend Collis Huntington moved to San Francisco with hopes of finding gold. Although they did not succeed in this specific venture, both became successful. Watkins became known for his photography skills, and Huntington became one of the "Big Four" owners of the Central Pacific Railroad. This would later be helpful for Watkins.

== Career ==
=== Prior to photography ===
During the first two years in San Francisco, Watkins did not work in photography. He originally worked for his friend Huntington, delivering supplies to mining operations. He did this before working as a store clerk at a George Murray's Bookstore, near the studio of Robert H. Vance, a well-known Daguerreotypist. An employee of Vance's unexpectedly left his job, and Watkins' agreeable personality led to his looking after the studio.

Before his work with Vance, Watkins knew nothing about photography. Vance showed him the basic elements of photography, planning to return and retake the portraits himself. However, when he came back, he found that Watkins had excelled at the art while he was away and his customers were satisfied.

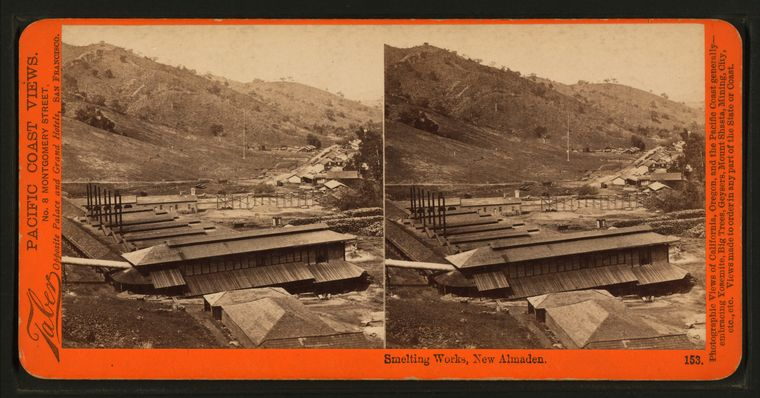
Smelting Works, New Almaden, by Watkins

=== Early work ===
By 1858, Watkins was ready to begin his own photography business. He did many commissions, including "Illustrated California Magazine" for James Mason Hutchings and the documentation of John and Jessie Fremont's mining estate in Mariposa. He made Daguerreotype stereoviews (two nearly identical images of the same scene, viewed through a stereoscope to create an illusion of depth) at the New Almaden mercury mine near San Jose, California. These were used in a widely publicized court case, which furthered his reputation as a photographer.

=== Oneonta Falls and Gorge ===
The Oneonta Gorge is a scenic gorge located in the Columbia River Gorge area of Oregon. The Oneonta Falls and Gorge were first photographed by Watkins, who named them after his hometown.

=== Yosemite ===
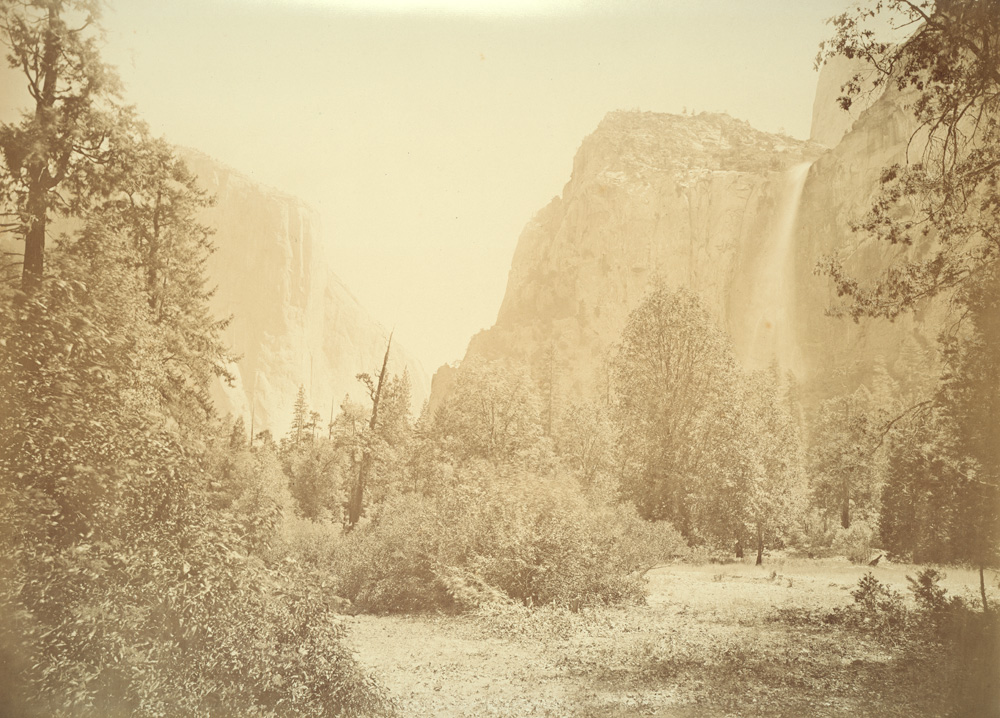
Bridal Veil Falls. One of Watkins' iconic Yosemite photographs

In July 1861, Watkins made the decision that changed his career: he traveled to Yosemite. He brought his mammoth-plate camera (which used 18×22 inch glass plates) and his stereoscopic camera. The stereoscopic camera was used to give the subject depth, and the mammoth-plate camera was used to capture more detail. The photographer returned with thirty mammoth plates and one hundred stereoview negatives. These were some of the first photographs of Yosemite seen in the East. The photographs were shown in New York at Goupil Gallery in 1862, and an article in the New York Times stated, "as specimens of the photographic art they are unequalled and reflect great credit upon the producer, Mr. Watkins. The views…are indescribably unique and beautiful. Nothing in the way of landscapes can be more impressive." In 1864, Watkins was hired to make photographs of Yosemite for the California State Geological Survey.

=== Studios ===
In 1867, Watkins opened his first public gallery, in addition to sending his photographs to the Universal Exposition in Paris, where he won a medal. This became his lavish Yosemite Art Gallery. He displayed over a hundred large Pacific Coast views in addition over a thousand images available through stereoscopes. Despite his success as an artist, he was not successful as a businessman and ended up losing his gallery to his creditor J.J. Cook.

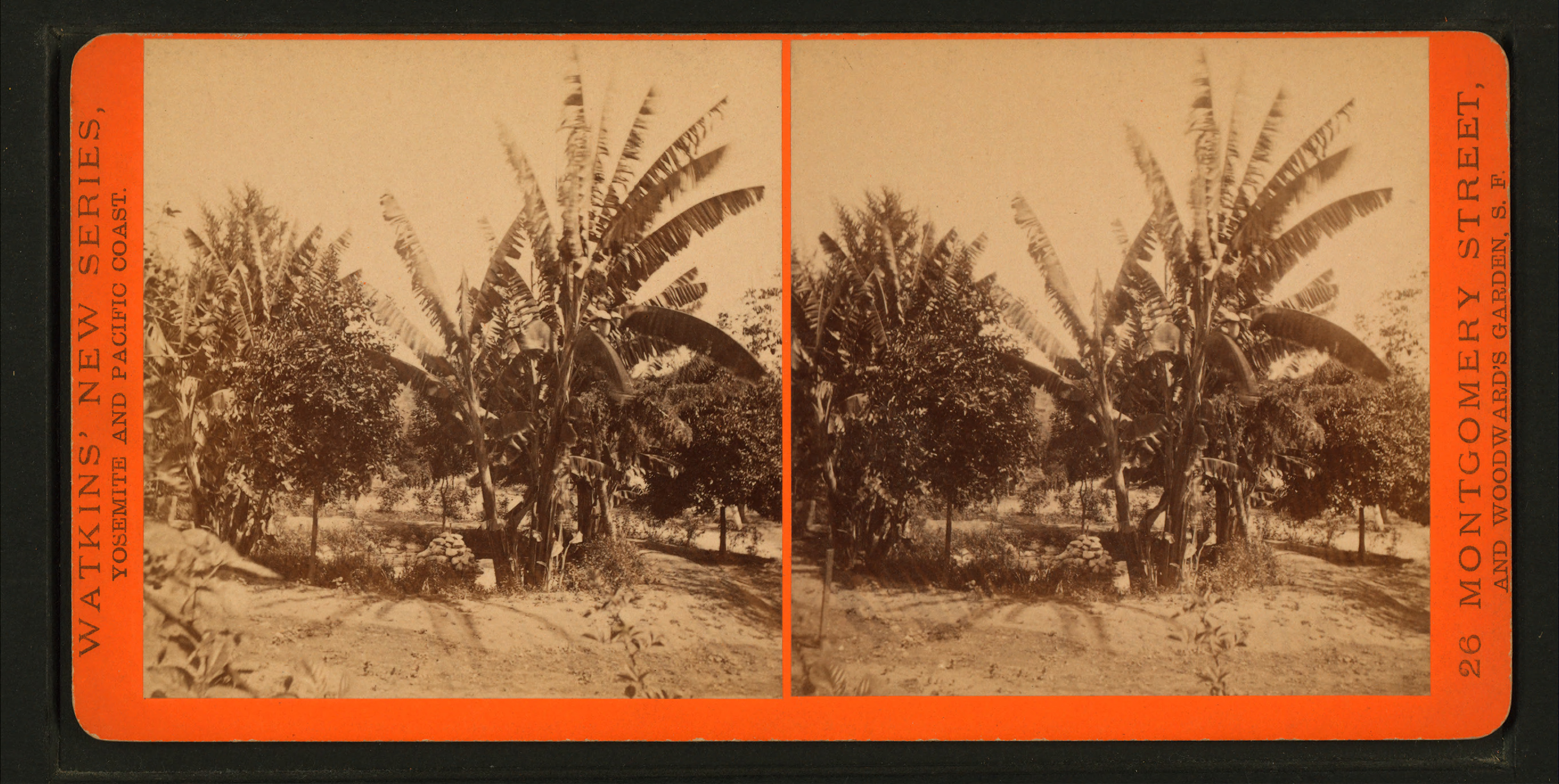
Plantain Tree, by Watkins

=== Taber and "New Series" ===
Not only did Watkins lose his studio to Cook, but he also lost its contents. When Cook and photographer Isaiah Taber took over Yosemite Art Gallery, they began reproducing his work without giving him credit. The 19th century had no copyright laws covering photographs, and there was nothing Watkins could do to combat this plagiarism. Subsequently, he began recreating the images he lost, calling it the "New Series."

== Personal life ==
Watkins met Frances Sneed photographing in Virginia City, Nevada. They became romantically involved in 1878 and were married a year later, on Watkins' fiftieth birthday. The couple had two children: a daughter Julia in 1881, and a son Collis in 1883.

== Decline ==
=== Loss of sight ===
Watkins began to lose his sight in the 1890s. His last commission was from Phoebe Hearst to photograph her Hacienda del Pozo de Verona. Watkins was unable to complete this job because of his failing sight and health. In 1895–96, his lack of work led to an inability to pay rent. The Watkins family lived in an abandoned railroad car for eighteen months.

=== Loss of work ===
Watkins kept the majority of his work in a studio on Market Street. This studio was destroyed in the 1906 San Francisco earthquake and fire, with countless pictures, negatives and the majority of his stereo views. After this horrific loss, he retired to Capay Ranch.

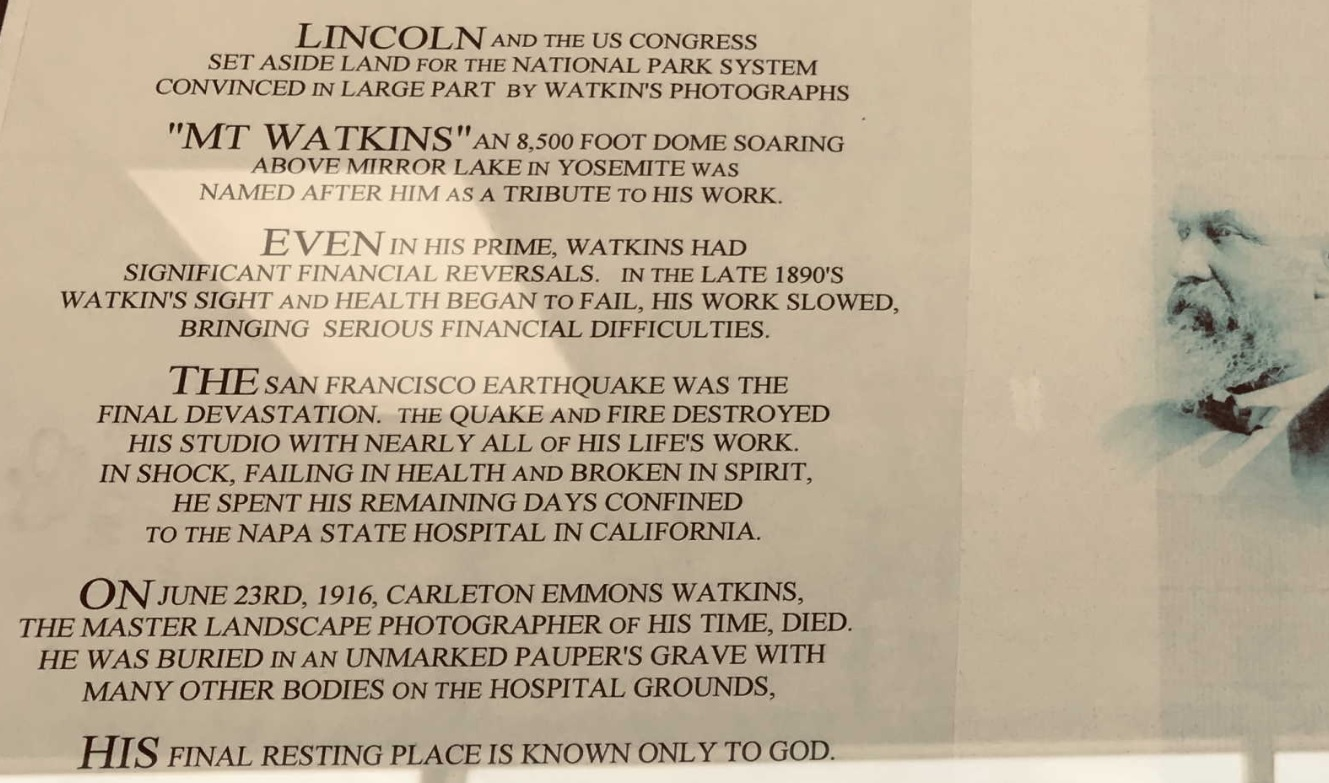

=== Napa State Hospital for the Insane ===
Three years after Watkins retired to Capay Ranch, he was declared incompetent and put into the care of his daughter Julia. She cared for him for a year before committing him to the Napa State Hospital for the Insane in 1910, at which point Frances Watkins began referring to herself as a widow. Watkins died on June 23, 1916, and was buried in an unmarked grave on the hospital grounds.

== Legacy ==
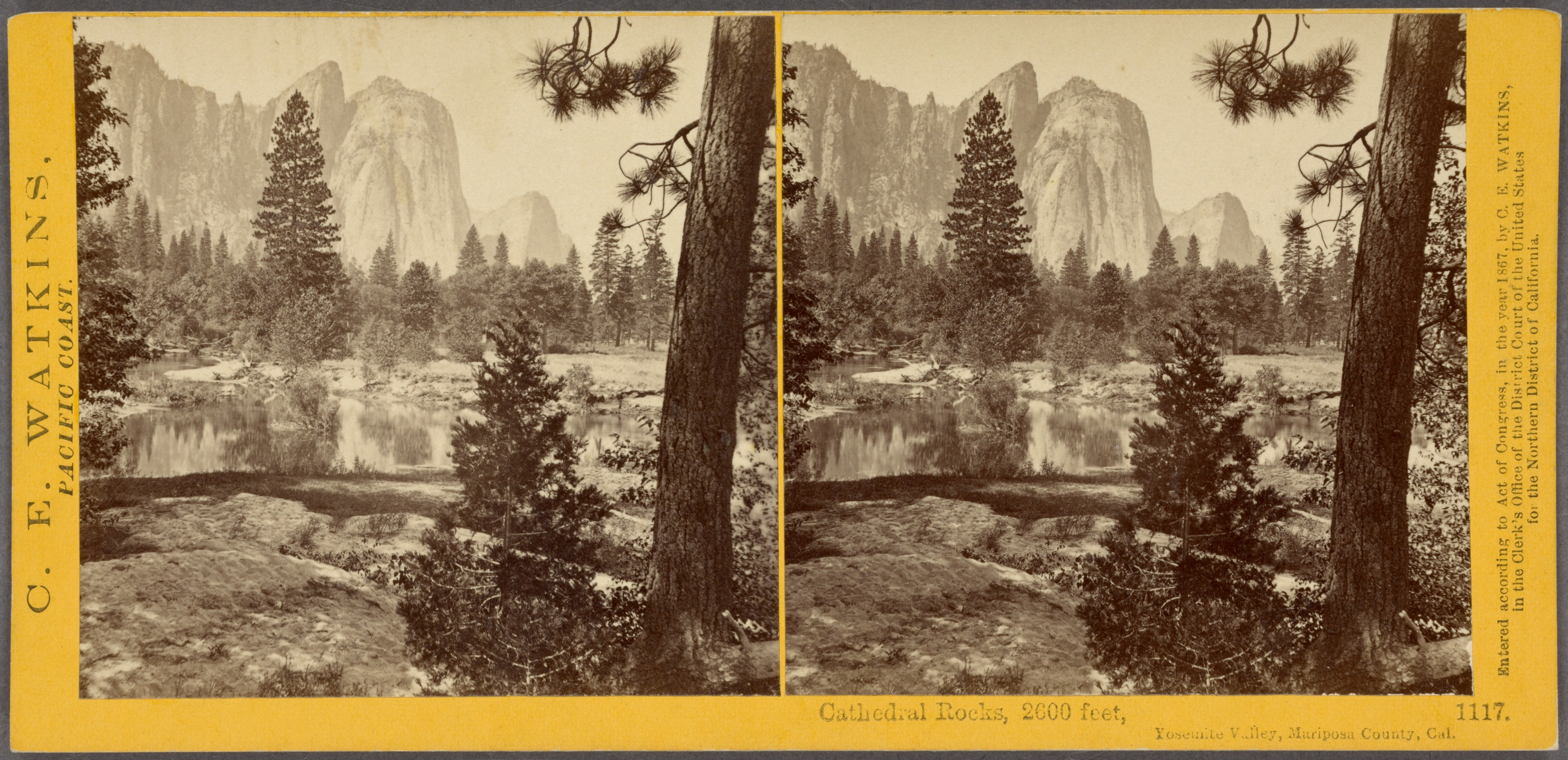
Cathedral Rocks, 2600 feet, Yosemite Valley, Mariposa County, Cal, by Watkins

=== Yosemite ===
Watkins often photographed Yosemite and had a profound influence over the politicians debating its preservation as a national park. His photographs did more than just capture the national park; he created an icon. Half Dome, for example, did already exist, but Watkins' photographs brought it to people in a way that they could experience it. It became iconic through his photographs, became something people wanted to see in person. His images had a more concrete impact on Yosemite becoming a national park than just encouraging people to visit. It is said that Senator John Conness passed Watkins' photographs around Congress. His photography was also said to have influenced President Abraham Lincoln and was one of the major factors in Lincoln signing the Yosemite Grant in 1864, a bill that declared Yosemite Valley inviolable. The bill paved the way for the 1872 creation of Yellowstone National Park, and the U.S. National Park System in its entirety. One of Yosemite's many mountains is named Mount Watkins in honor of Watkins' part in preserving Yosemite Valley.

Watkins was a "master of the reflected image" and photographed reflections, in bodies of water, of the Yosemite mountains.

=== Environmentalism ===
The 1864 bill signed by Lincoln is often seen as the beginning of environmentalism in American politics. In accordance with his influence in preserving Yosemite and the beginning of the National Parks system, Watkins is seen as an important part of that. His photographs captured nature in a way that caught the eye of Americans. He created sublime images of wilderness, pristine landscapes untouched by humans. These images established icons that furthered environmentalist ideals, helping to back claims about preservation.

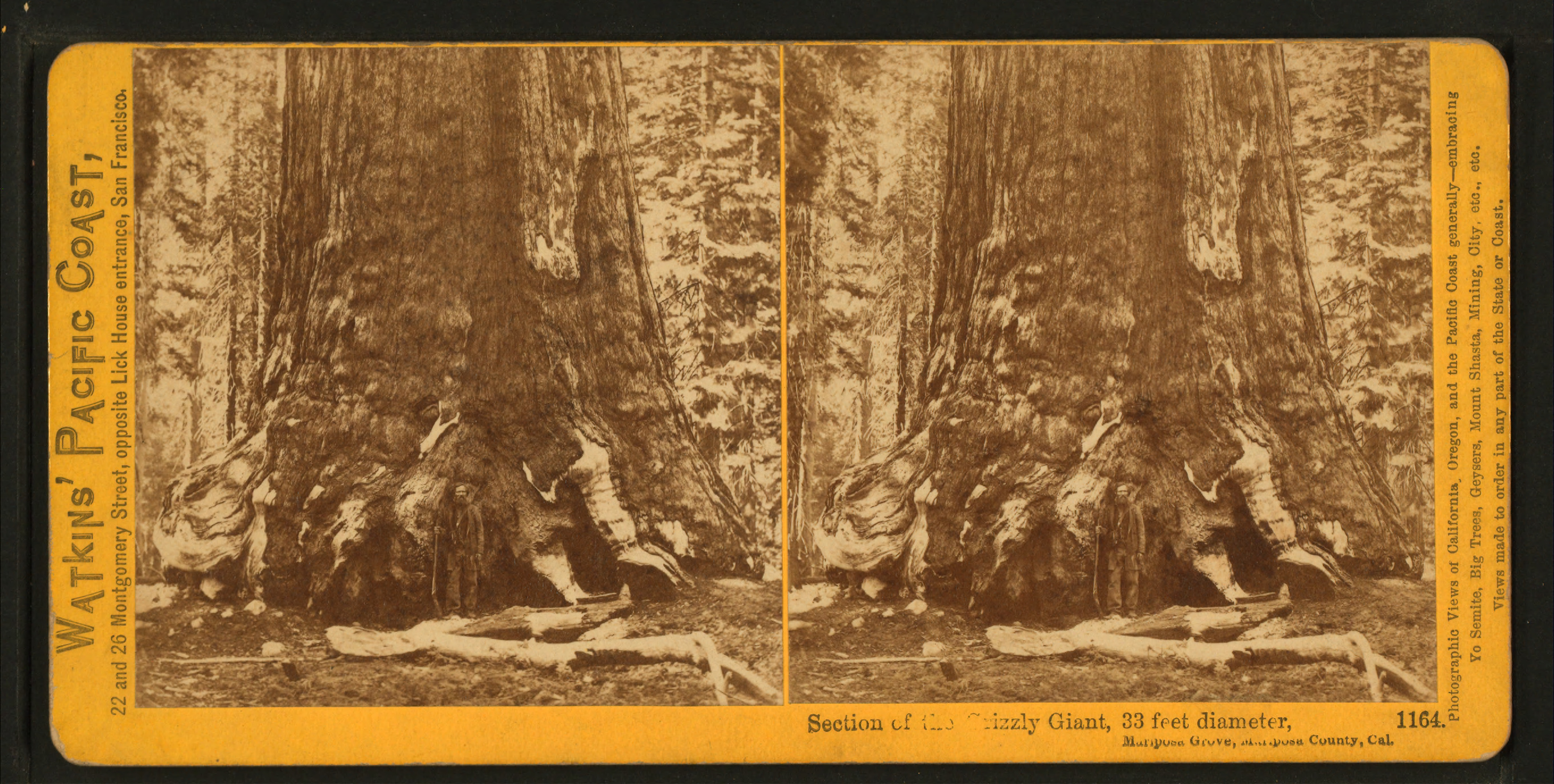
Section of the Grizzly Giant, looking up, Mariposa Grove, Mariposa County, Cal, by Watkins

=== Grizzly Giant ===
Watkins photographed one of the giant sequoia trees in California, the "Grizzly Giant." His photo was created with one of his mammoth plates, which allowed him to photograph the entire tree, which had not been done before. Watkins, in addition to creating an image not seen before, was already very well known, and the image rapidly gained fame. Despite the fact that Watkins was attempting to preserve the trees, the way his photograph captured American audiences led to an increase in tourism in the area, which led to larger commercialization, which led to a diminishing of the giant sequoias.
