= Mammoth plate =

A mammoth plate is a photographic plate that is usually 18 x 21 inches, but may vary in size from 15 by 18 inches to 22 by 25 inches. There is no official sizing or naming production chart for these glass negatives, only historical record. Before photographic enlargers were developed, photographers used mammoth plates to make large prints that were precisely the same size as the negative from which they were made. Notably, American landscape photographer Carleton Watkins derived his detailed images of the American West, namely his views of Yosemite commissioned by the California State Geological Survey, from mammoth plates.

There is a proposed naming for very large plates under the listing "Mega Mammoth".
