= Horsetail Falls (Oregon) =

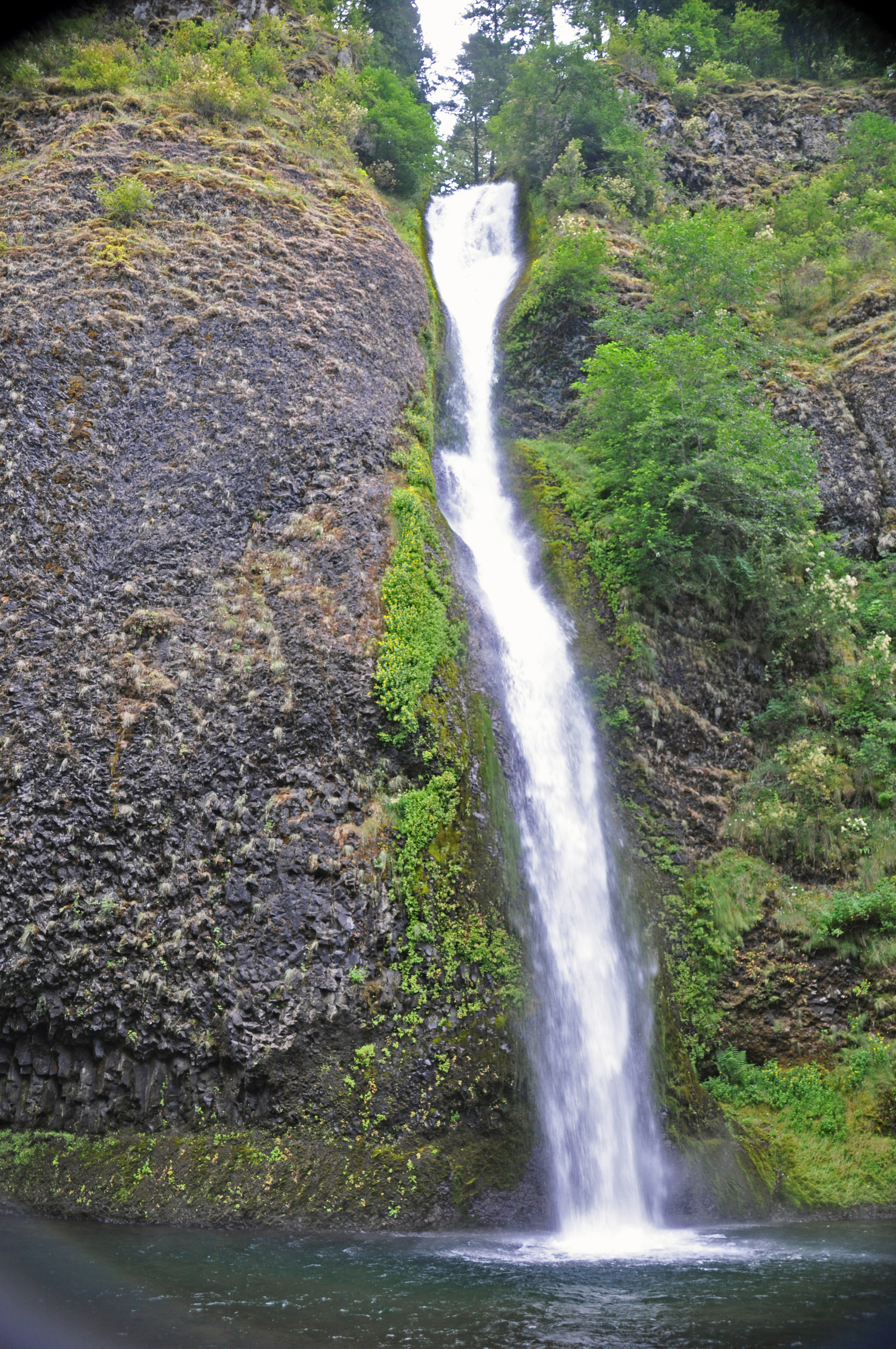
- Horsetail Falls and pool

- Location within Oregon
- Location: Columbia River Gorge
- Coordinates: 45.5896°N 122.0687°W
- Type: Horsetail
- Elevation: 224 ft (68 m)
- Total height: 176 ft (54 m)
- Number of drops: 1
- Average width: 15 ft (4.6 m)
- Watercourse: Horsetail Creek

Horsetail Falls (or Horse Tail Falls) is a waterfall located on Horsetail Creek along the Columbia River Gorge in Multnomah County, in the U.S. state of Oregon. The falls drop over a cut over the columnar basalt cliff within the Oneonta Gorge. It is one of the waterfalls along the Columbia River Highway's waterfall corridor.

== Access ==
The waterfall is easily accessed, in contrast to its near neighbor Oneonta Falls, as it is right next to the Historic Columbia River Highway. The shape of the falls and the rounded rockface over which it flows cause it to resemble a horse's tail.

There are actually two waterfalls along the creek. The upper falls, called Upper Horsetail Falls or Ponytail Falls, can be accessed from a footpath. The path has steep cliffs and the U.S. Forest Service urges hikers to use caution when accessing the trails.

=== Incidents ===
In May 2016, 37 year old Stephanie Cohen died after trying to rescue her son who had fallen when the footing on the trailhead gave way. She fell dozens of feet and was fatally injured. Her son recovered with minor injuries.

In May 2024, 22 year old Elisha Angelic Macias was killed when she became separated from her hiking party and accidentally went off trail near the Oneonta Trail. She fell 50–60 feet and was fatally injured.

== Horsetail Falls Bridge ==
The Historic Columbia River Highway passes across Horsetail Falls on a bridge, the Horsetail Falls Bridge, which is listed on the National Register of Historic Places as a contributing structure. It is a 60-foot (18 m) reinforced concrete slab span. The bridge was built in 1914 and is unique in its design in which it has been strengthened in 1998 from its original constitution by fibre-reinforced plastic.

== Gallery ==
Gallery of waterfall images
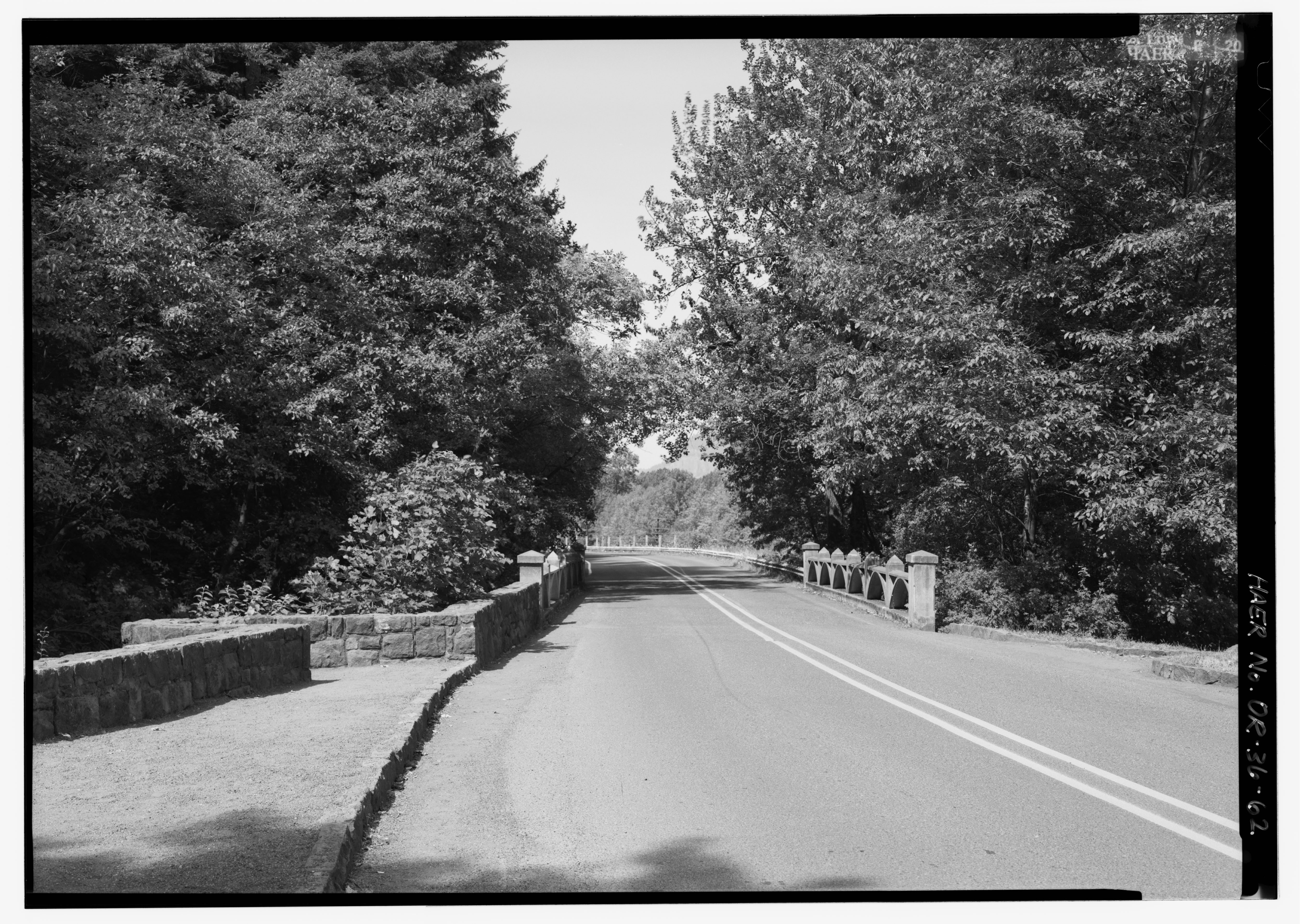
Horsetail falls Bridge on the Historic Columbia River Highway

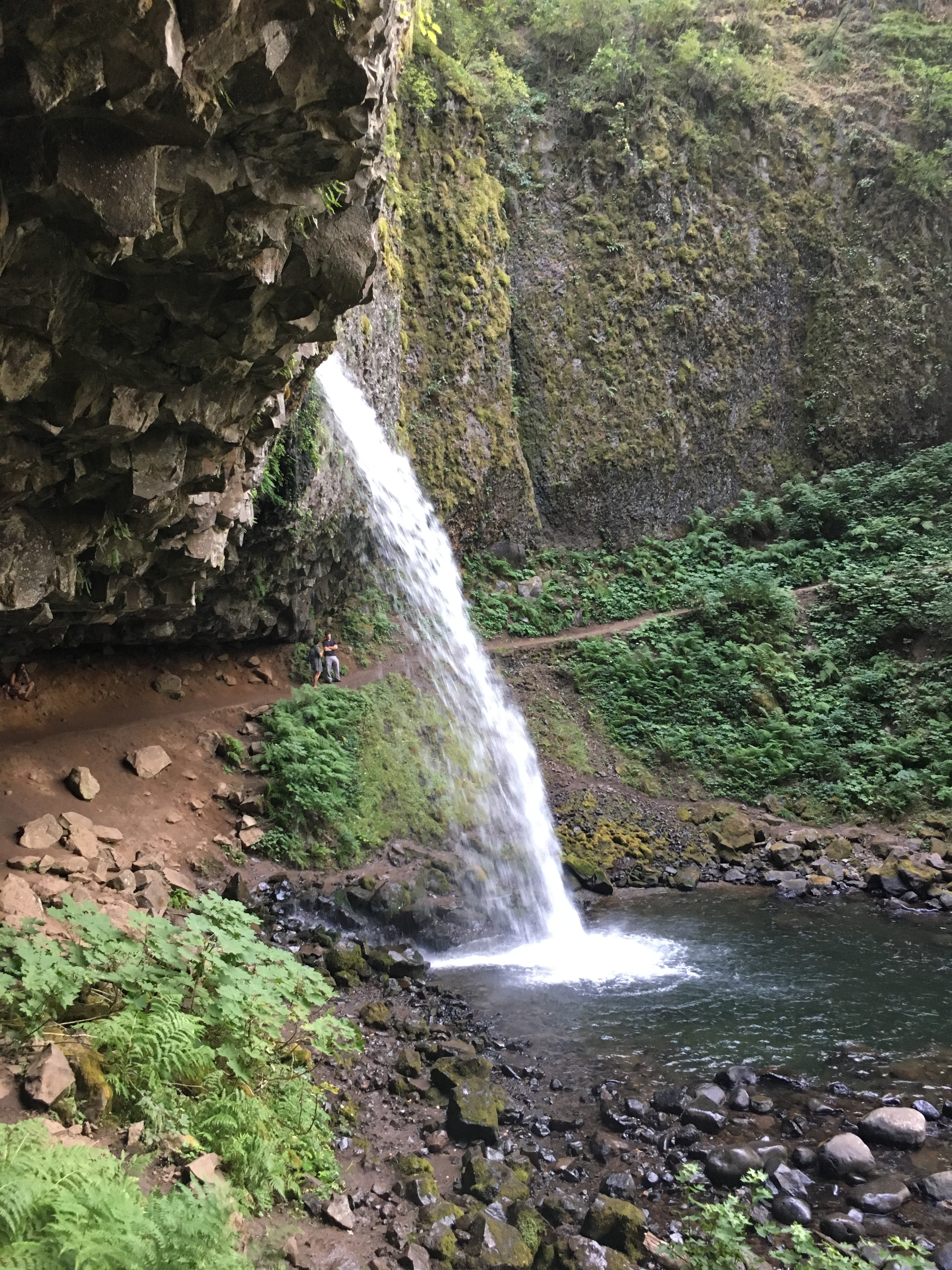
Ponytail falls

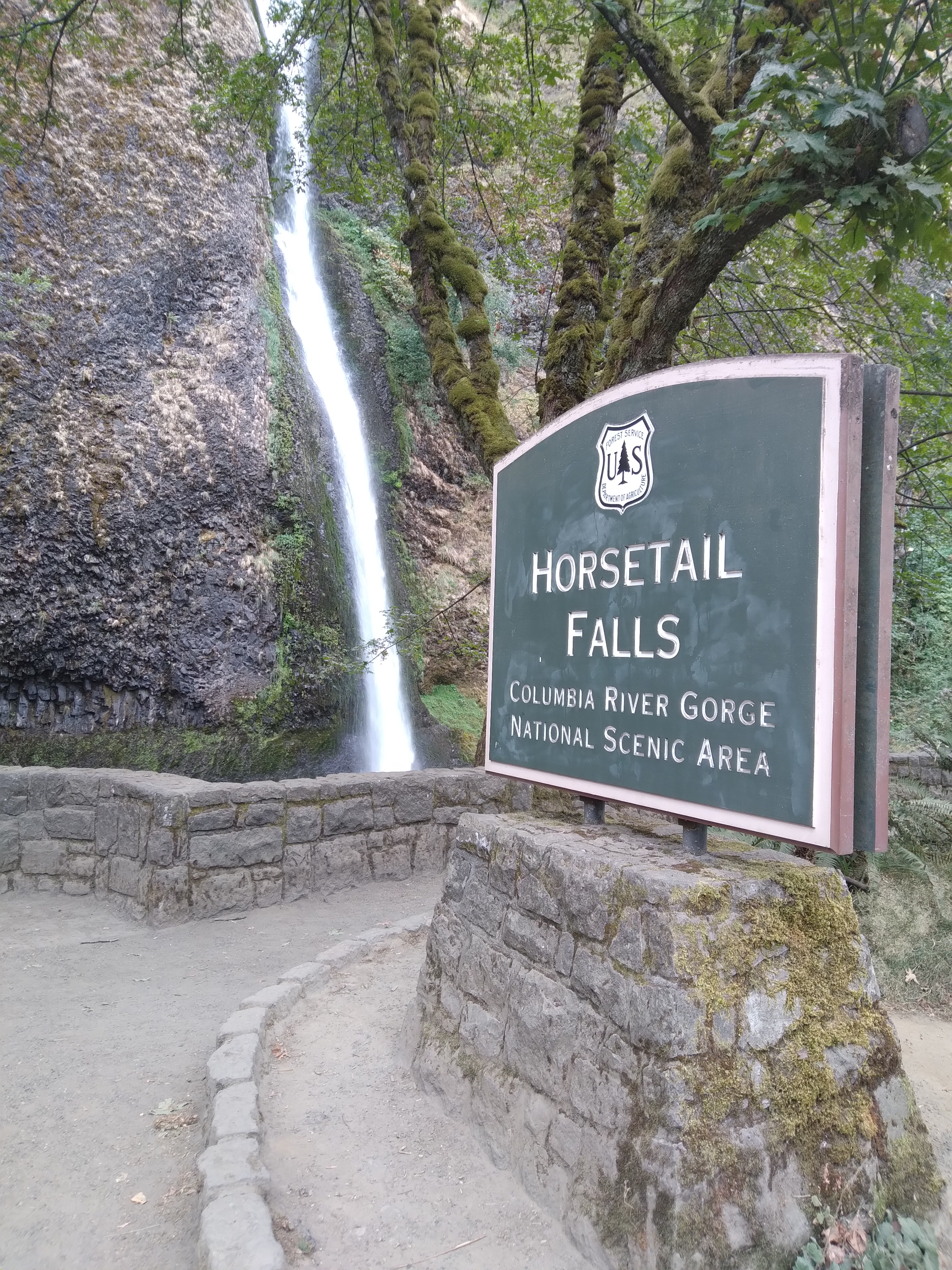
Horsetail falls road sign

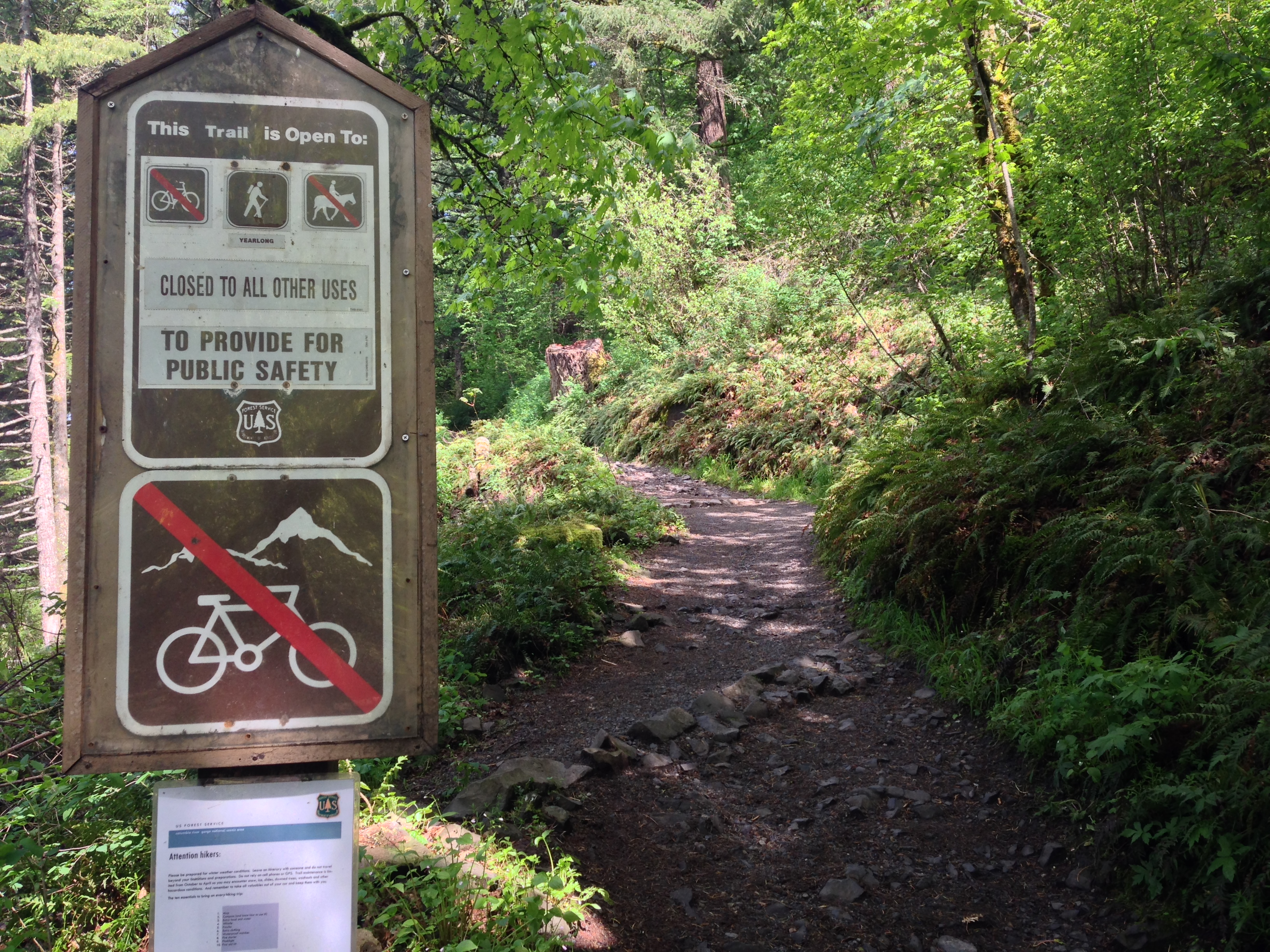
Horsetail Falls Trail

== See also ==
- List of bridges documented by the Historic American Engineering Record in Oregon
- List of bridges on the National Register of Historic Places in Oregon
