= Triple Falls =

Triple Falls may refer to:

- Triple Falls (California) — a 35 ft. waterfall located at Uvas Canyon County Park
- Triple Falls (North Carolina) — a 125 ft. waterfall located in the DuPont State Forest
- Triple Falls (Oregon) — a 64 ft. waterfall located in the Oneonta Gorge
- Triple Falls - waterfalls on Englishman River, Vancouver Island, British Columbia, Canada
