= Digital Access to a Sky Century @ Harvard =

Sky survey database project

DASCH
- Commercial?: No
- Location: Cambridge, Massachusetts, United States
- Owner: Center for Astrophysics | Harvard & Smithsonian
- Founder: Jonathan E. Grindlay, principal investigator
- Established: 2001 (25 years ago)
- Funding: National Science Foundation
- Status: Active
- Website: dasch.rc.fas.harvard.edu

The Digital Access to a Sky Century @ Harvard (DASCH) was a project that digitized much of the collection of astronomical photographic glass plate negatives created by the Harvard College Observatory and housed in the collection known as the Harvard Plate Stacks. It was a major project of the Center for Astrophysics | Harvard & Smithsonian. The project digitized nearly all of the direct images in the Harvard Plate Stacks with a total of 429,274 glass plates scanned for the final data release in 2024. The database contributes to the field of time domain astronomy, providing nearly hundred years more of data that may be compared to current observations.

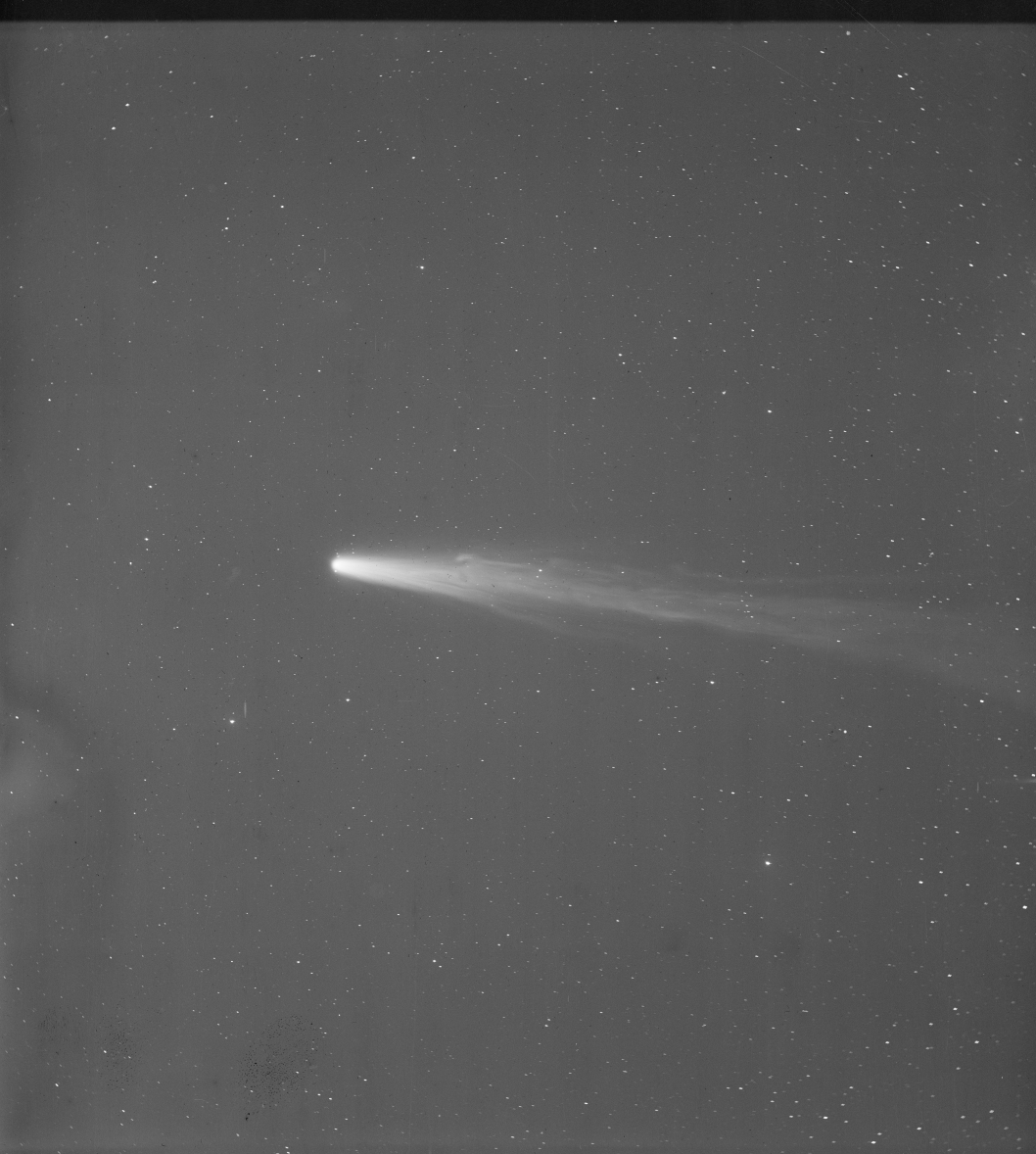
Portion of Plate b41215 of Halley's Comet taken on April 21, 1910 from Arequipa, Peru with the 8-inch Bache Doublet, Voigtlander. The exposure was 30 minutes centered on 23h41m29s R.A. and +07d21m09s Declination.

From 1885 until 1992, the Harvard College Observatory repeatedly photographed the night sky using observatories in both the northern and southern hemispheres. Over half a million glass photographic plates are stored in the observatory archives providing a unique resource to astronomers. The Harvard collection is over three times the size of the next largest collection of astronomical photographic plates and is almost a quarter of all known photographic images of the sky on glass plates. Those plates were seldom used after digital imaging became the standard near the end of the twentieth century. The scope of the Harvard Plate Stacks collection is unique in that it covers the entire sky for a very long period of time.

== Goals ==
The project web site states that the goals of DASCH are to

enable new Time Domain Astronomy (TDA) science, including:

- Conduct the first long-term temporal variability survey on days to decades time scales
- Novae and dwarf novae distributions and populations in the Galaxy
- Black hole and neutron star X-ray binaries in outburst: constraining the BH, NS binary populations in the Galaxy
- Black hole masses of bright quasars from long-term variability measures to constrain their characteristic shortest timescales and thus size
- Quiescent black holes in galactic nuclei revealed by tidal disruption of a passing field star and resultant optical flare
- Unexpected classes of variables or temporal behavior of known objects: preview of what PanSTARSS and LSST may see in much more detail but on shorter timescales.

== History ==
Digitizing the Harvard College Observatory's astronomical plates archive was first considered in the 1980s by Jonathan E. Grindlay, a professor of astronomy at Harvard. Grindlay encouraged Alison Doane, then curator of the archive, to explore digitizing the collection with a commercial image scanner. Working with Jessica Mink, an archivist of the Center for Astrophysics | Harvard & Smithsonian, Grindlay and Doane determined that a commercial scanner could produce suitable digital images but also found that such machines were too slow. Working full-time, it would have taken over 50 years to digitize the plates in the Harvard archive with commercial scanners.

Doane presented a talk about the problem at a meeting of the Amateur Telescope Makers of Boston whose clubhouse is located on the grounds of MIT's Haystack Observatory. Bob Simcoe, a club member and retired engineer, volunteered to help design a machine suitable for the task. The machine needed to position and record the stellar images on the plates to within half a micron and account for different emulsions, plate thicknesses and densities, exposure times, processing methods and so on. Software was developed by Mink, Edward Los, another volunteer from the club, and Silas Laycock, a researcher. Thanks to a grant from the National Science Foundation and donations of time and material, creation of the scanner began in 2004. The scanner was completed and tested in 2006. Over 500 plates were imaged before the project ran out of money in July 2007.

For the digital images to be useful for research, the associated metadata also needs to be digitalized. That data describes what part of the sky and what objects were recorded on each plate along with date, time, telescope, and other pertinent information. The metadata is recorded in about 1,200 logbooks and on the card catalog of the collection. In addition, each plate is stored in a paper jacket that includes related information and often scientifically and historically important notes left by previous researchers, including notable astronomers such as Henrietta Swan Leavitt and Annie Jump Cannon. George Champine, another volunteer from the Amateur Telescope Makers of Boston, photographed the logbooks. The paper jacket for each plate is photographed as each plate is cleaned and imaged.

== Progress ==
=== Plate imaging ===
The first plate images were created by Harvard Observatory staff members in the winter of 2001–2002 using commercial scanners. A larger test that included imaging 100 plates was conducted in the summer of 2002. Those tests indicated that commercially available scanners were too slow for digitizing the Harvard plate collection and motivated the development of a custom-built scanner. The test images are available on-line. The custom-built high-speed scanner was completed and tested in 2006.

Improvement of the scanner and associated software continues. A failure of a single part in the plate loader led to a breakdown of the scanner in August 2014. A new plate loader control system was designed and built by Bob Simcoe allowing scanning to resume in November 2014.

As of November 2014, over 80,000 plates have been scanned and the data released on the DASCH web site, approximately 6.5 percent of the plate collection. The 80,000th plate was scanned on November 13, 2014.

=== Metadata transcription ===
Most of the metadata for the plate collection is contained in 663 bound volumes and about 500 looseleaf logbooks. Photographs of all of the logbook pages are available on the DASCH website. The effort to digitize this information began at Harvard. Some was done in India. The effort later moved to the American Museum of Natural History where volunteers worked under the supervision of Dr Michael Shara, Curator of the Department of Astrophysics and Holly Klug, Department. of Volunteer Services.

In August 2014, the transcription of the Harvard plate logbooks was taken over by the Smithsonian Transcription Center, a new program to recruit volunteers to transcribe historical documents. This citizen science project is ongoing with a goal of completing all of the transcription before 2017.

=== DASCH Data Release 7 (DR7) ===
The DASCH project completed its two decade effort in 2024 when the final plates were scanned. DASCH Data Release 7 (DR7) was released on 2024 December 29. The primary DASCH DR7 data product is a catalog of astrophysical lightcurves referenced to the AAVSO Photometric All-Sky Survey Data (APASS) Release 8, covering the entire sky across the years ~1880–1990.

The DASCH data can be accessed through several different methods: daschlab, the DASCH web APIs, or Starglass. Daschlab is a Python toolkit that allows you to perform basic data retrievals and analysis using cloud-based Jupyter notebooks. DASCH web APIs can used to retrieve DR7 data using any number of programming languages though standard RESTful JSON-oriented interfaces The Starglass website provides a user interface and a programmatic API allowing access to DASCH plate-level data products and queries.

== Other activities ==
=== Additional projects ===
While the primary goal of the project was strictly to complete digitizing the Harvard Plate Stacks collection, the DASCH team did accommodate two special requests to image plates that were not part of the Harvard collection "for scientifically compelling reasons".

The New Horizons team requested images of Pluto in order to improve the dwarf planet's ephemeris that was needed to plan precise adjustments to the spacecraft's trajectory. DASCH scanned 843 plates showing Pluto that were taken by the 40-inch telescope at Lowell Observatory from 1930 to 1951.

Forty-two plates of the Cassiopeia A supernova remnant taken by the Hale Telescope at the Palomar Observatory from 1951 to 1989 were imaged to support a study comparing x-ray and visual emissions. As of November 2014, the study has not been published in a peer reviewed journal.

The glass plates of National Geographic Society – Palomar Observatory Sky Survey, European Southern Observatory SRO Sky Surveys, and the UK Schmidt Telescope survey have started to be scanned by the DASCH scanner system. Very few examples from these later surveys are included in the DASCH Data release 7. Scanning of these plates is ongoing at a slower rate that before.

=== StarGlass ===
Launched on December 29, 2024, the new database, StarGlass, is the current iteration and successor to DASCH. StarGlass incorporates the data and imagery collected by DASCH as well as two other projects, Project PHaEDRA and StarNotes, to create an even larger database that allows for both scientific and historical investigations of these materials. Importantly, StarGlass is a graph database and hosted on the cloud, while DASCH is a MySQL database. StarGlass is also the first time that all of the data including full FITS files of the scans are made publicly available to any registered user, and allows for the use of an API. DASCH data is also accessible through 'daschlab'.

== Controversy ==
The DASCH project initiated various formal and informal discussions among historians and scientists on the preservation of artifacts that document the history of astronomy. Specifically, these discussions centered around the value of the historic annotations present on the non-emulsion side of the glass plate photographs and what should be the standard of best practices for preserving analog astrophotography as a historical record of astronomical discovery in the 19th and 20th centuries.

Many of the plate annotations were made by astronomers in the course of their work that resulted in significant scientific discoveries that are at the foundation of the field of astrophysics. DASCH digitized plates in the Harvard Plate Stacks that were annotated by astronomers such as Henrietta Swan Leavitt, Annie Jump Cannon, Cecilia Payne-Gaposchkin, Edward Pickering and Vainu Bappu, to name a few. Those who argue in favor of scraping off annotations state that annotations or grime on the plate may obscure the star or object that they potentially may need to study and that the annotations have little to no scientific or historical value. Those who argue in favor of preserving the annotations state that the markings offer proof of a person’s discovery, identify sources of discrepancies in research in order to correct data, can reattribute a first discovery, or illustrate historic work processes and cultural patterns in the history of science. The historical record of women’s work in the sciences is disproportionately less than documentation of men’s work in the sciences. Thus, having original annotations and artifacts that document women’s contributions is particularly important.

In 2022, the Center for Astrophysics | Harvard & Smithsonian committed to stop scraping annotations for the remainder of the glass plate photographs that were yet to be scanned by DASCH. Advocacy by artists, historians, librarians, and conservators played a major role in coming to this resolution. Future digitization projects at the Harvard Plate Stacks will utilize a multispectral imaging system that allows for a nondestructive process that will yield digital data that can be used for astrophysics and the humanities.
