= New York University Archives =

Repository for historical documents regarding New York University

Coordinates: 40.729466°N 73.997117°W

The New York University Archives has served, since 1977, as the final repository for the historical records of New York University (NYU), in the Greenwich Village neighborhood of Manhattan in New York City, New York, U.S. The NYU Archives contains documents, photographs or drawings collected since 1854, including records or notebooks of some notable people. It functions primarily to document the history of the university and to provide source material for administrators, faculty, students, alumni, and other members of the university community. The NYU Archives also accommodates scholars, authors, and other interested persons who seek to evaluate the impact of the university's activities on the history of American social, cultural and intellectual development.

The archives house official records, papers, and publications of New York University; personal or professional papers of New York University faculty; Special Collections (records and papers which are neither official university records nor faculty papers, but which relate to the history of New York University; and an Archives Reference Collection (vertical subject files, biographical directories, archival manuals and publications, copies of books and publications by faculty members, duplicate yearbooks, repository guides and finding aids and inventories to materials related to New York University that are housed in other repositories). In all, the NYU Archives contains 10,000 linear feet (3,000 linear meters) of archive and manuscript materials.

== Mission ==
The core mission of the University Archives is:

- To appraise, collect, organize, describe, make available, and preserve records of historical, legal, fiscal, and/or administrative value to New York University
- To provide adequate facilities for the retention and preservation of such records
- To provide information services that will assist the operation of the university
- To serve as a resource and laboratory to stimulate and nourish creative teaching and learning
- To serve research and scholarship by making available and encouraging the use of its collections by members of the university and the community at large
- To promote knowledge and understanding of the origins, aims, programs, and goals of the university, and of the development of these aims, goals, and programs
- To implement records management by formulating policy and procedures that will ensure the collection and preservation of archival materials

== History ==
Although August 1977 marked the NYU Archives' designation as the "official repository for all non-current records of the University," its origins date to NYU's Antebellum period. In June 1854, Isaac Ferris, NYU's third president, received a motion from the University Council to collect the publications of alumni for preservation in the library, and “to obtain for deposit in the archives the plates of all the commencements and exhibitions.”

In 1922, NYU Chancellor Elmer Ellsworth Brown commissioned Professor Theodore F. Jones to write a history of the university in commemoration of its centennial celebration in 1932. Dr. Jones assembled the "New York University Collection," which included printed and manuscript material relating to the history of NYU, and placed the collection in the Treasure Room at the Gould Memorial Library on the University Heights Campus (currently the site of Bronx Community College). Jones gathered council minutes, financial records, chancellor's files, official university publications, books, pamphlets, academic bulletins, student/faculty publications and photographs, among numerous other materials, to form the nucleus of the University Archives as it exists today.

In 1967, NYU President James M. Hester established the Office of University Archivist and commissioned Dr. Thomas C. Pollock "to gather material for and write a modern history of the University." According to minutes of the advisory committee on the history of New York University (ACHNYU) meeting from June 14, 1967, "...Pollock had agreed to become Archivist of the University with the responsibility for writing a new history...The Office of the Archivist would be set up and a small staff would work under Dr. Pollock's supervision in collecting data for the history. Up to that time, NYU had assigned the role of managing the university's records – mainly the minutes of the governing council and the academic senate – to the secretary of the university.

Under the supervision of the advisory committee chaired by Professor Bayard Still, Dr. Pollock and his full-time research assistant, Emilie Adam, collected and preserved materials deemed essential for writing a history of NYU in the 20th century. The pair disseminated questionnaires to long-service University personnel, requesting accounts of their experiences at NYU. Pollock and Adam additionally asked department chairpersons to submit brief histories of their respective departments and divisions.

Upon Dr. Pollock's resignation in March 1969, President Hester assigned responsibility for the archival program to Professor Still, who, along with Ms. Adam, worked effectively in carrying this endeavor forward. Professor Still and Adam conducted oral interviews with instrumental figures in the University's history, microfilmed a complete set of Council/Board of Trustees minutes, and acquired missing volumes of student newspapers and periodicals. The combined efforts of Dr. Jones and Drs. Pollock and Still – over nearly 50 years – effectively preserved NYU's historical record.

In January 1969, Dr. Pollock expressed to university librarian Dr. Charles F. Gosnell, the need for the consolidation of the historical materials assembled under the ongoing documentary program: "The University Archives should be kept in a central place. It would seem logical to have them in or near the Elmer H. Bobst Library when it is completed."

The sale of the University Heights Campus in 1973 expedited the consolidation Pollock had desired – The New York University Collection was moved from the Heights Campus and reassembled in 1974 at 19 University Place. On September 20, 1974, Chancellor Sidney Borowitz formally designated Professor Still as director of the Archives Office.

The University Archives remained at 19 University Place until the summer of 1979 when the collection moved to Bobst Library, sharing the space on the tenth floor with the Tamiment Library and Robert F. Wagner Archives. The University Archives eventually moved into its own quarters in 1981, finding a home in the East wing of the tenth floor of Bobst. In 1986, under the administration of university archivist Tom Frusciano, the archives adopted the new RG/MC system, abandoning the shelf-list arrangement used since the centennial documentary project conducted by Professor Jones. In recent years, the NYU Archives has continued to document the university's history and serve the NYU community under the direction of university archivist Nancy Cricco and assistant university archivist Janet Bunde.

== Collections ==
Among the NYU Archives vast holdings, collections of interest include:

=== Athletics ===
The archives holds extensive documentation on intercollegiate athletics at NYU. Materials include clippings, photographs, memorabilia, athletic programs and videotapes. Highlights of the collection include:

- files of the New York University Basketball Program, 1906–1967
- New York University Football Program Records, 1889–1967
- NYU Olympic Athletes, 1904–1972
- records of the New York University Fencing Program, 1925–1972
- Miguel DeCapriles papers, 1920–1972.

==== Faculty materials ====
Faculty material in the archives consists primarily of biographical sketches in vertical files and photographs in portrait files. In certain cases the archives hold more extensive materials. Highlights include:

- Lyman Bradley Academic Freedom Case
- Edwin Berry Burgum Academic Freedom Case, 1934–1961
- Draper (John and Henry) Family Collection
- Samuel F.B. Morse Collection
- Diary of John Torrey, professor of botany, 1833
- Papers of Richard Pommer, professor of architecture, 1965–1991
- Papers of Derrick Bell, visiting professor, NYU Law School
- Papers of Annette Weiner, professor of anthropology, former dean of Graduate School of Arts and Science

=== History of NYU ===
The majority of the material in the archives documents NYU's history. Publications, minutes, annual reports, photographs and memorabilia all illustrate the ways in which the university has changed and grown, as well as the traditions it has maintained. Specific collections also bring the story of the university to life. Highlights include:

- Records of the Office of Chancellor/President, 1827–1974
- Clippings Collection, 1853–1950
- Founding of the university, 1830–1958
- Minutes of the board of trustees, 1829–1964
- Early instruction at the law school, 1832–1856

=== Student life ===
This collection documents student life from the founding of the university up to the present day. Material covers official school functions, including classes, conferences, and dances; extracurricular activities, including plays, student publications and sporting teams; and informal occasions, such as concerts in the park and "down time" in dorm rooms and Loeb Student Center. A large collection of photographs supplements the textual material on student life. Highlights of the collection include:

- Elbert William Brown student notebook, 1897
- William Frank Burroughs student notebook, 1858
- Class collections, 1843–1966
- Student Affairs Office, 1924–1974
- Inventory of student newspapers
- Student organizations' publications and records, to present

=== John Brademas Congressional Papers ===
The John Brademas Congressional Papers document the career of John Brademas, president emeritus of NYU, during 22 years as a US Congressional Representative from Indiana's Third District, from 1959 to 1981. Brademas served on the Committee on Education and Labor throughout his tenure and became a leading figure in the creation of legislation concerning education, arts and humanities, vocational rehabilitation, services for the elderly and handicapped and libraries and museums. The collection includes documents related to the administrative, legislative and political functions of his office.

In 2001, as president emeritus of NYU, Brademas donated his congressional papers, measuring nearly 500 linear feet (150 linear m), to the University Archives. The collection will serve as the cornerstone for a congressional studies center that Brademas is seeking to found at the university.

=== Publications ===
The archives holds numerous publications produced by New York University administration, departments, students and community members. Highlights include:

- Histories of NYU and its schools, colleges and divisions
- Biographies and autobiographies of distinguished trustees, administrators, faculty and alumni
- Selected faculty publications
- Annual Reports, bulletins, catalogs and promotional literature
- Student publications

=== History of Greenwich Village ===
Because of NYU's long-term presence in Greenwich Village (New York), the archives holds extensive material documenting the history of the area, on the west side of Lower Manhattan in New York City. Books, clippings and papers written by students in the Public History program all provide information on the area, while its extensive photograph collection illustrates the changing face of the neighborhood. In addition to this general information, highlights include:

- Northern Dispensary Collection
- Washington Square Association records, 1908–1979
