= Oneonta Creek =

- Location of the mouth of Oneonta Creek

Location
- Country: United States
- State: New York
- Region: Central New York Region

Physical characteristics
- Source: Wilber Lake
  - location: N of Oneonta, New York
  - coordinates: 42°31′48″N 75°01′52″W
- Mouth: Otsego Lake
  - location: Cooperstown, New York
  - coordinates: 42°27′14″N 75°03′15″W
  - elevation: 1,079 ft (329 m)

Oneonta Creek is a river in Otsego County, New York. Oneonta Creek drains out of Wilber Lake, flows through Oneonta, and empties into the Mill Race which empties into the Susquehanna River.
