= Oneonta Gorge =

Lower Oneonta Falls
- Oneonta Gorge Falls
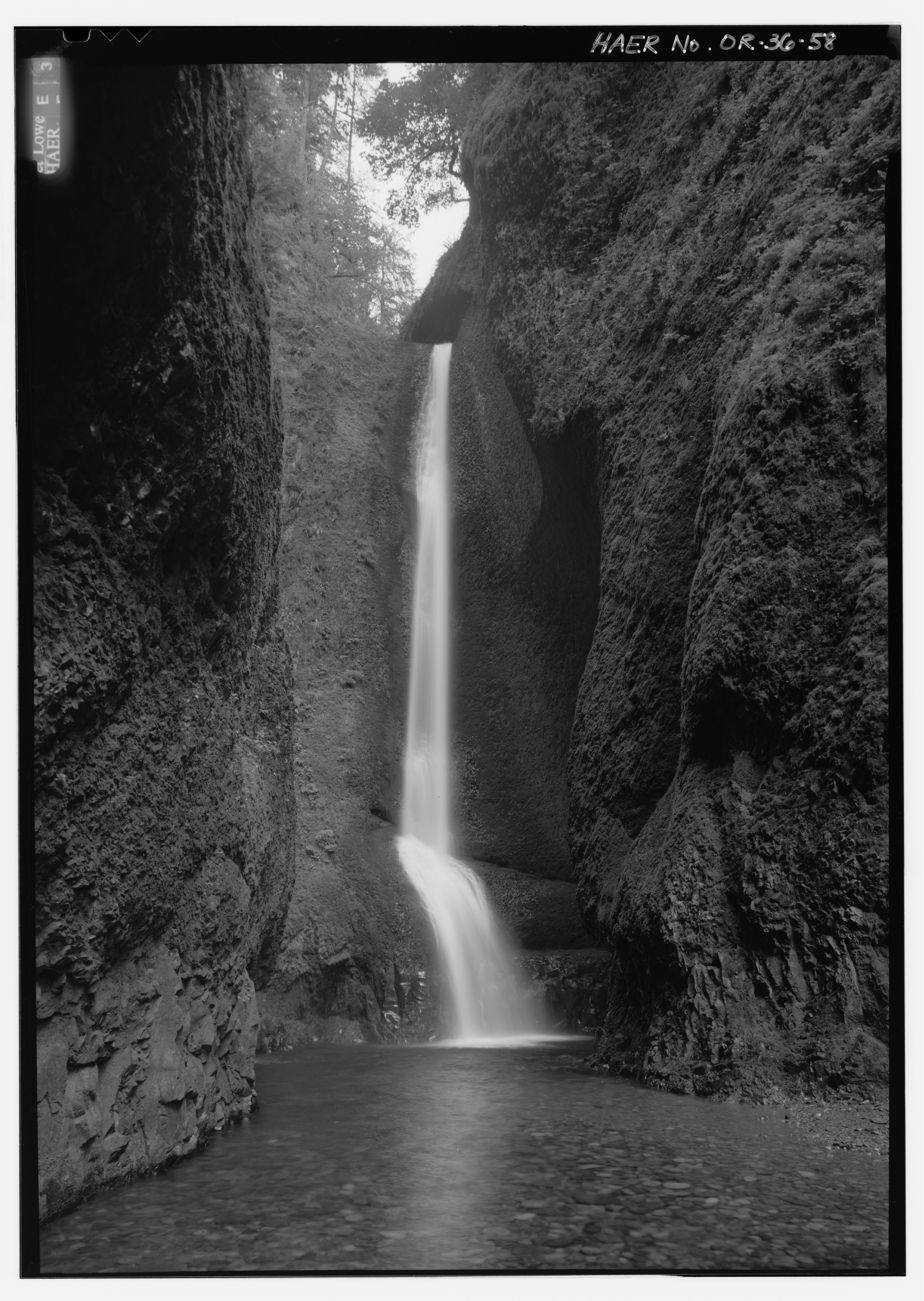
- Interactive map of Lower Oneonta Falls
- Location: 45.58556°N 122.07278°W Multnomah County, Oregon, United States
- Type: Plunge
- Total height: 100 feet (30 m)
- Number of drops: 1

Middle Oneonta Falls
- Oneonta Falls
- Interactive map of Middle Oneonta Falls
- Location: 45.58515°N 122.07279°W Multnomah County, Oregon, United States
- Type: Horsetail
- Total height: 24 feet (7.3 m)
- Number of drops: 1
- Average flow rate: 150.0 cfs

Upper Oneonta Falls
- Oneonta Falls
- Interactive map of Upper Oneonta Falls
- Location: 45.58235°N 122.07278°W Multnomah County, Oregon (no trail access)
- Type: Plunge
- Total height: 65 feet (20 m)
- Number of drops: 1
- Average flow rate: 100.0 cfs

Triple Falls
- Lower Oneonta Falls, Oneonta Gorge Falls
- Interactive map of Triple Falls
- Location: 45.57861°N 122.07222°W Multnomah County, Oregon, United States
- Type: Segmented
- Total height: 64 feet (20 m)
- Number of drops: 1
- Average flow rate: 200 cfs

Oneonta Gorge is a scenic gorge located in the Columbia River Gorge area of the American state of Oregon. The U.S. Forest Service has designated it as a botanical area because of the unique aquatic and woodland plants that grow there. Exposed walls of 25-million-year-old (Miocene epoch) basalt are home to a wide variety of ferns, mosses, hepatics, and lichens, many of which grow only in the Columbia River Gorge. Oneonta Gorge with its 50 species of wildflowers, flowering shrubs and trees has been described as "one of the true dramatic chasms in the state." The Oneonta Gorge Creek Bridge is listed on the National Register of Historic Places.

There are four major waterfalls on Oneonta Creek as it runs through the gorge. Middle Oneonta Falls can be seen clearly from a footpath and is very often mistaken for the upper or lower falls. The lower gorge (a slot canyon) has been preserved as a natural habitat, so there is no boardwalk or footpath through it as such. Thus, Lower Oneonta Falls can only be seen by walking upstream from the creek's outlet at the Historic Columbia River Highway. To get to a vantage point where the entire lower falls is visible may require wading through water that in some places can be shoulders-deep, depending on the season and the relative amount of snow melt. The upper falls are about a mile upstream from the middle falls and require scrambling up the creek or climbing down a canyon wall to view. The fourth falls which is "Triple falls" can be viewed from several vantage points on the upper trails in the canyon.

The Oneonta Gorge was first photographed by Carleton Emmons Watkins, a native of Oneonta, New York, who had traveled west in 1851 during the time of the California Gold Rush. Watkins named the Oneonta Falls after his hometown.

== Access ==
The trail has issues due to natural as well as human impacts. In the late 1990s, the stream was partially occluded when three large boulders (the size of "pickup trucks") tumbled into the stream. Subsequently, a log jam has formed in the midst of the slot canyon. This has created a hazard for hikers, which led to a fatality in 2011.

As of November 2020, trails providing access to the waterfalls remain closed due to damage from the 2017 Eagle Creek Fire.

=== Incidents ===
In March 2024, 63 year old Terina Kaye Chapman was found dead after she did not return from a solo hike to Oneonta Falls. She was found at the bottom of a cliff near Horsetail Falls.

== Oneonta Gorge Creek Bridge ==
Built in 1914, the Oneonta Gorge Creek Bridge, approximately 0.5 miles (0.8 km) downstream from the falls, is a "four-span 80-foot [24 m] reinforced-concrete deck girder trestle" that "is 24 feet [7.3 m] wide and has a roadway measuring 22 feet [6.7 m]." It is a contributing structure in the Historic Columbia River Highway, which was listed on the National Register of Historic Places in 1983.

== Gallery ==
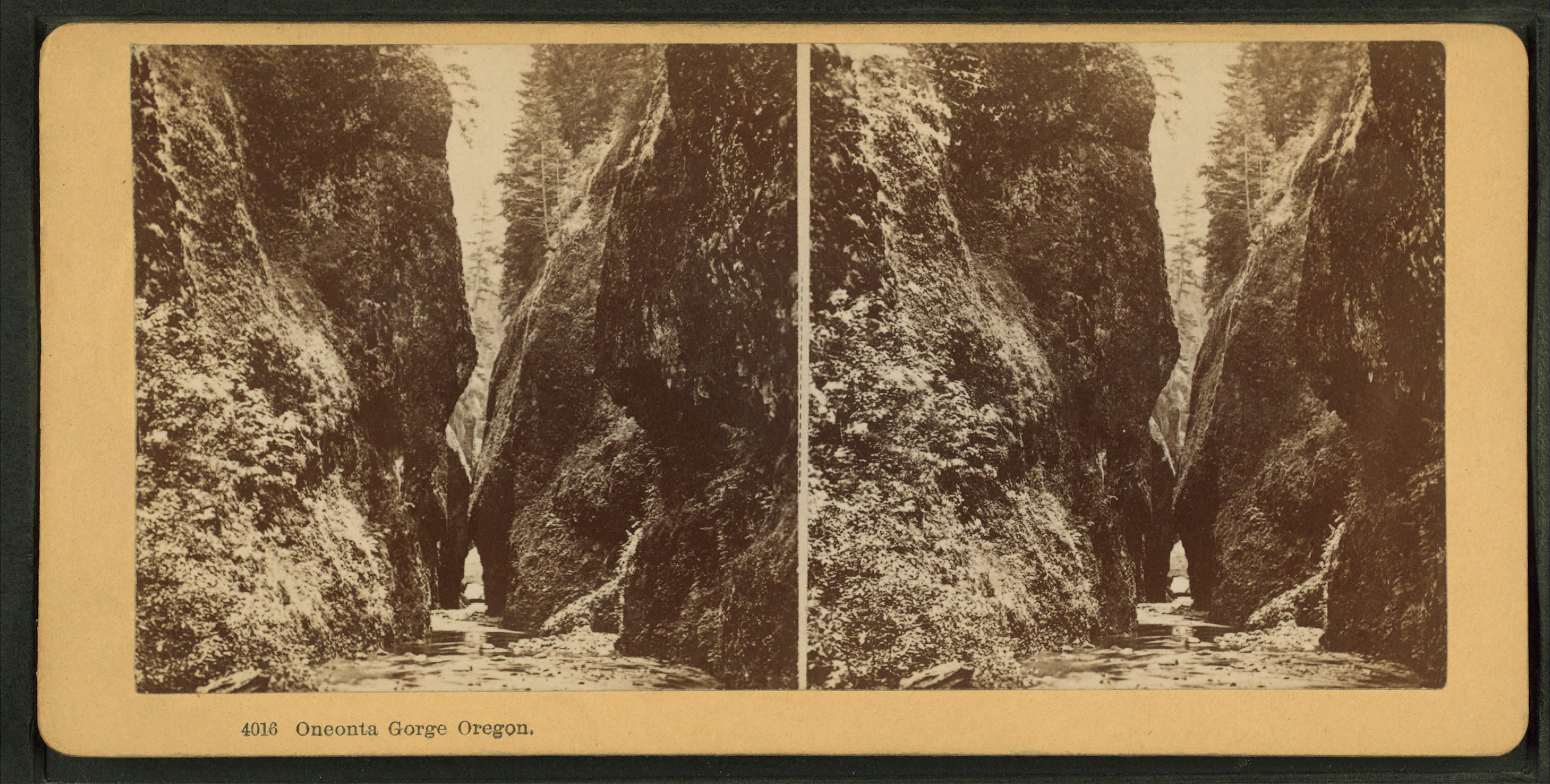
Oneonta Gorge, Oregon, from Robert N. Dennis collection of stereoscopic views

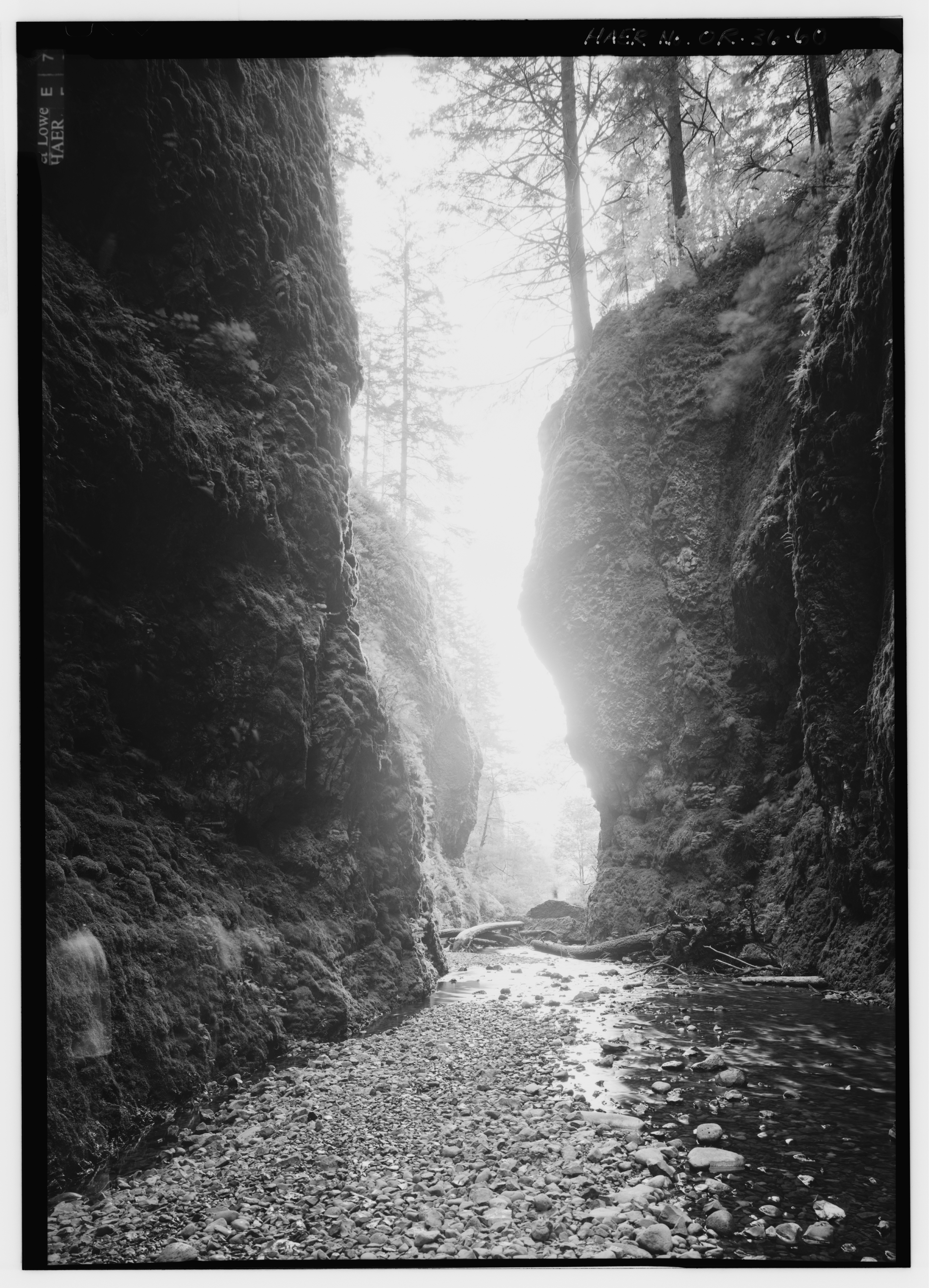
Oneonta Gorge

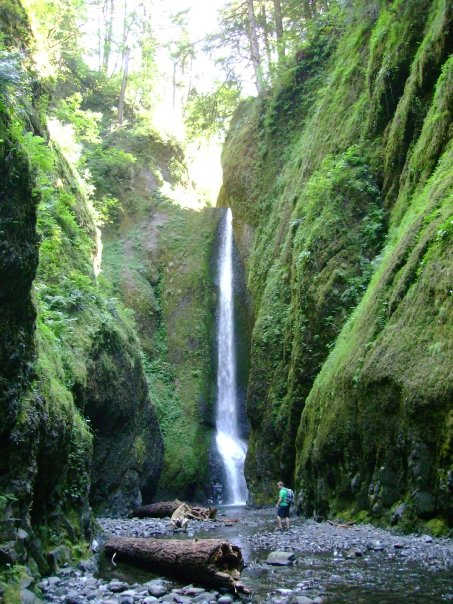
Oneonta Gorge falls

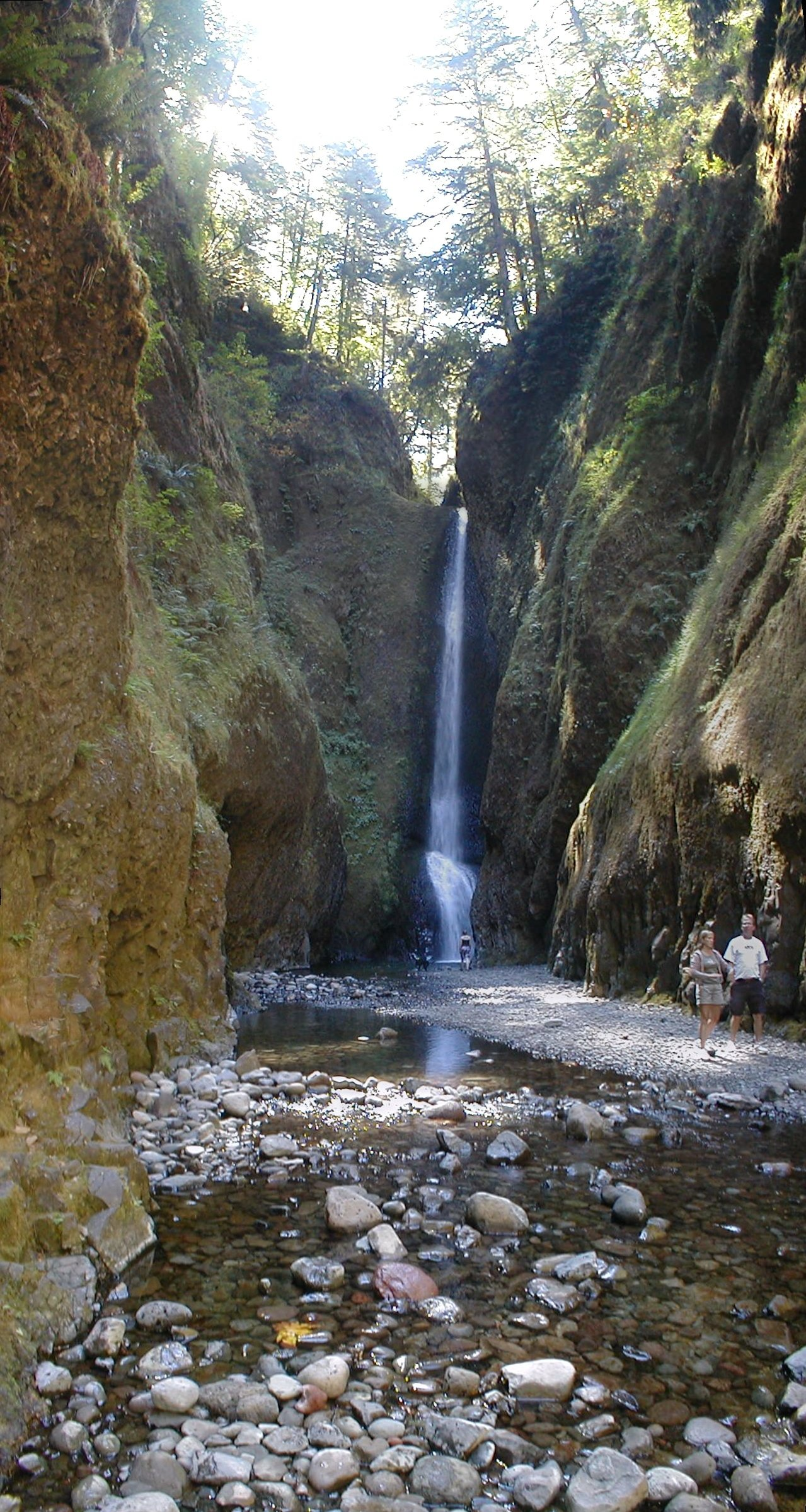
Lower Oneonta Gorge falls

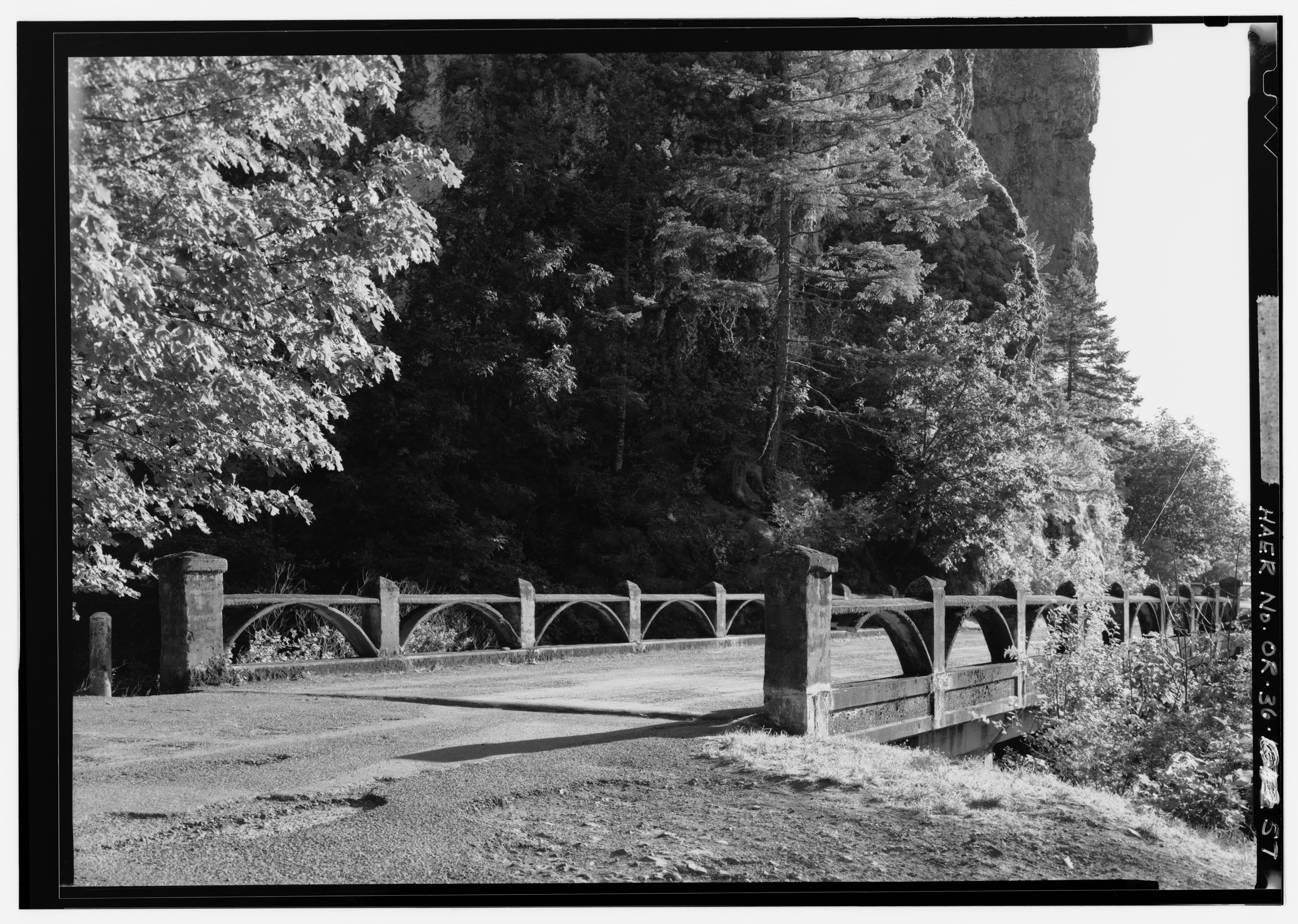
Oneonta Gorge Creek Bridge on the Historic Columbia River Highway

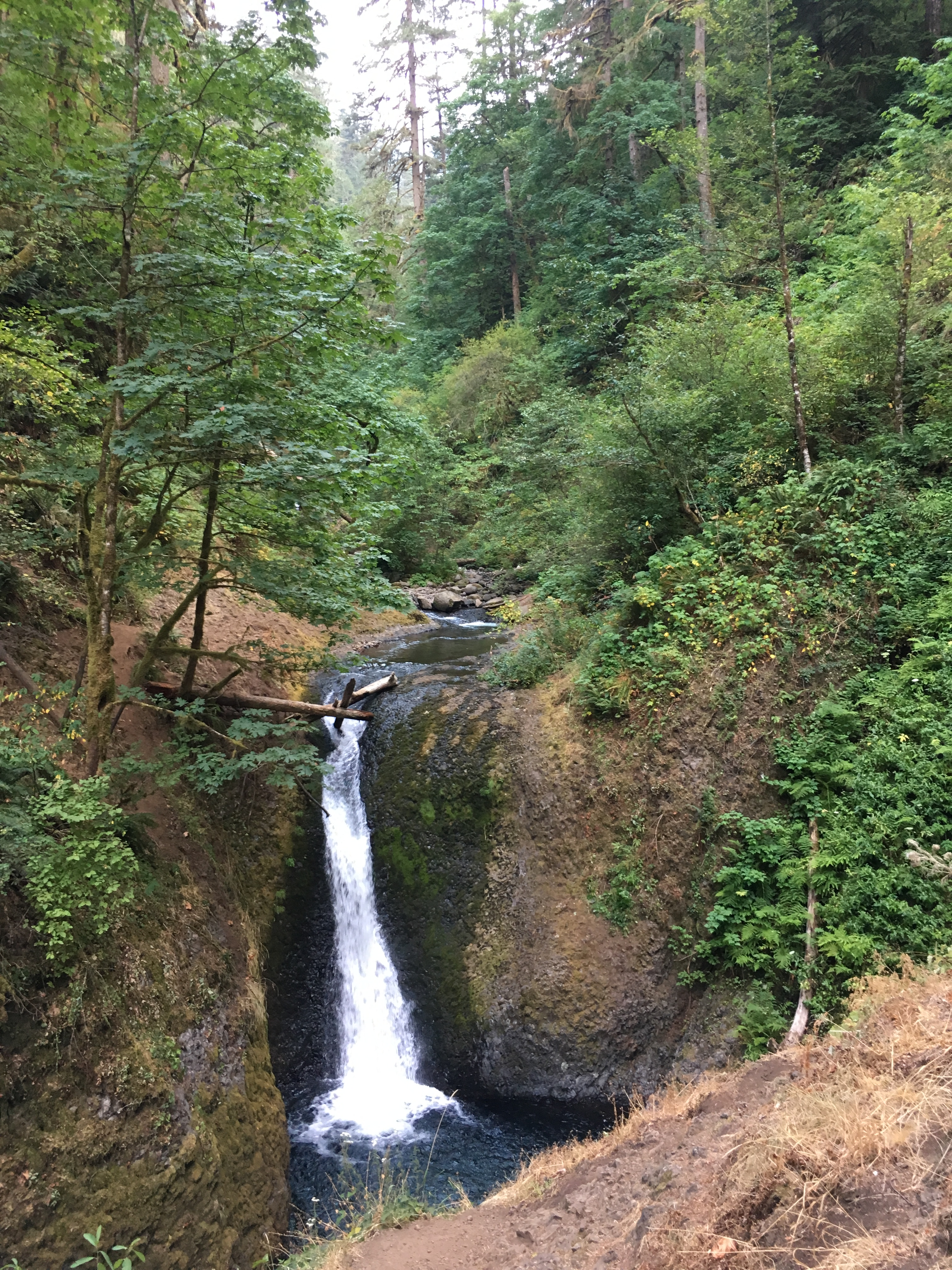
Middle Oneonta Falls

== See also ==
- List of bridges documented by the Historic American Engineering Record in Oregon
- List of bridges on the National Register of Historic Places in Oregon
