= Henrietta Swan Leavitt =

American astronomer (1868–1921)

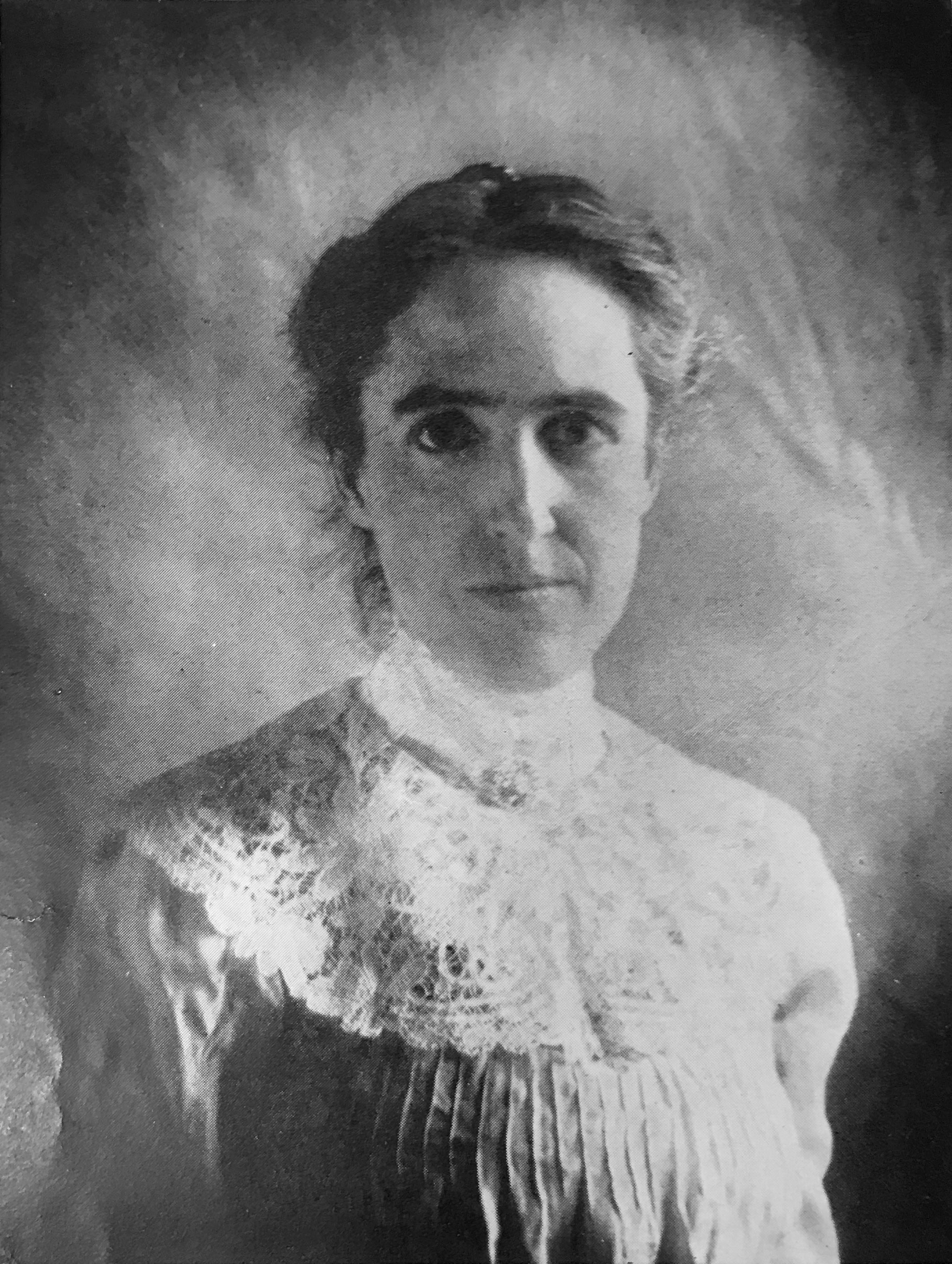
- Leavitt, c. 1898
- Born: July 4, 1868; Lancaster, Massachusetts, U.S.
- Died: December 12, 1921 (aged 53); Cambridge, Massachusetts, U.S.
- Education: Oberlin College; Society for the Collegiate Instruction of Women (BS)
- Known for: Leavitt's Law: the period–luminosity relationship for Cepheid variables
- Scientific career
- Fields: Astronomy
- Workplaces: Harvard University, Oberlin College

Henrietta Swan Leavitt (/ˈlɛvɪt/; July 4, 1868 – December 12, 1921) was an American astronomer. Her discovery of how to effectively measure vast astronomical distances led to a shift in the understanding of the scale and nature of the universe.

A graduate of Radcliffe College, she worked at the Harvard College Observatory as a human computer, tasked with measuring photographic plates to catalog the positions and brightness of stars. This work led her to discover the relation between the luminosity and the period of Cepheid variables. Leavitt's discovery provided astronomers with the first standard candle with which to measure the distance to other galaxies.

Before Leavitt discovered the period–luminosity relationship for Cepheid variables (sometimes referred to as Leavitt's Law), the only techniques available to astronomers for measuring the distance to a star were based on stellar parallax. Such techniques can only be used for measuring distances out to several hundred light years. Leavitt's great insight was that while no one knew the distance to the Small Magellanic Cloud, all its stars must be roughly the same distance from Earth. Therefore, a relationship she discovered in it, between the period of certain variable stars (Cepheids) and their apparent brightness, reflected a relationship in their absolute brightness. Once calibrated by measuring the distance to a nearby star of the same type via parallax, her discovery became a measuring stick with vastly greater reach.

After Leavitt's death, Edwin Hubble found Cepheids in several nebulae, including the Andromeda Nebula, and, using Leavitt's Law, calculated that their distance was far too great to be part of the Milky Way and were separate galaxies in their own right. This settled astronomy's Great Debate over the size of the universe. Hubble later used Leavitt's Law, together with galactic redshifts, to establish that the universe is expanding (see Hubble's law).

== Early life and education ==
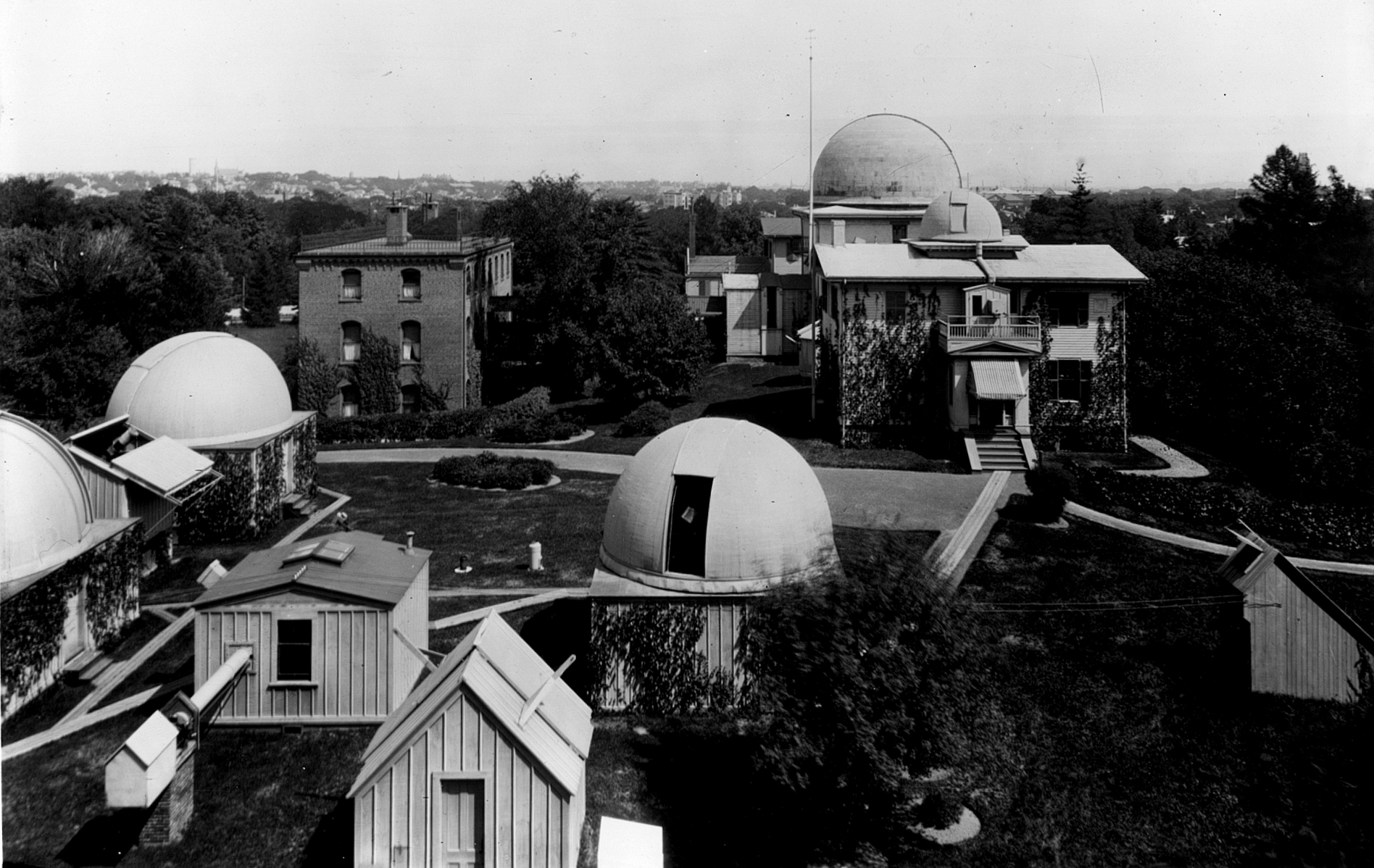
The observatory at Harvard where Henrietta Swan Leavitt worked.

Henrietta Swan Leavitt was born in Lancaster, Massachusetts, the daughter of Henrietta Swan Kendrick and Congregational church minister George Roswell Leavitt. She was a descendant of Deacon John Leavitt, an English Puritan tailor, who settled in the Massachusetts Bay Colony in the early seventeenth century. (In the early Massachusetts records, the family name was spelled "Levett".) Henrietta Leavitt remained deeply religious and committed to her church throughout her life.

Leavitt attended Oberlin College for two years before transferring to Harvard University's Society for the Collegiate Instruction of Women (later Radcliffe College), where she received a bachelor's degree in 1892. At Oberlin and Harvard, Leavitt studied a broad curriculum that included classical Greek, fine arts, philosophy, analytic geometry, and calculus. In her fourth year of college, Leavitt took a course in astronomy, in which she earned an A− grade.

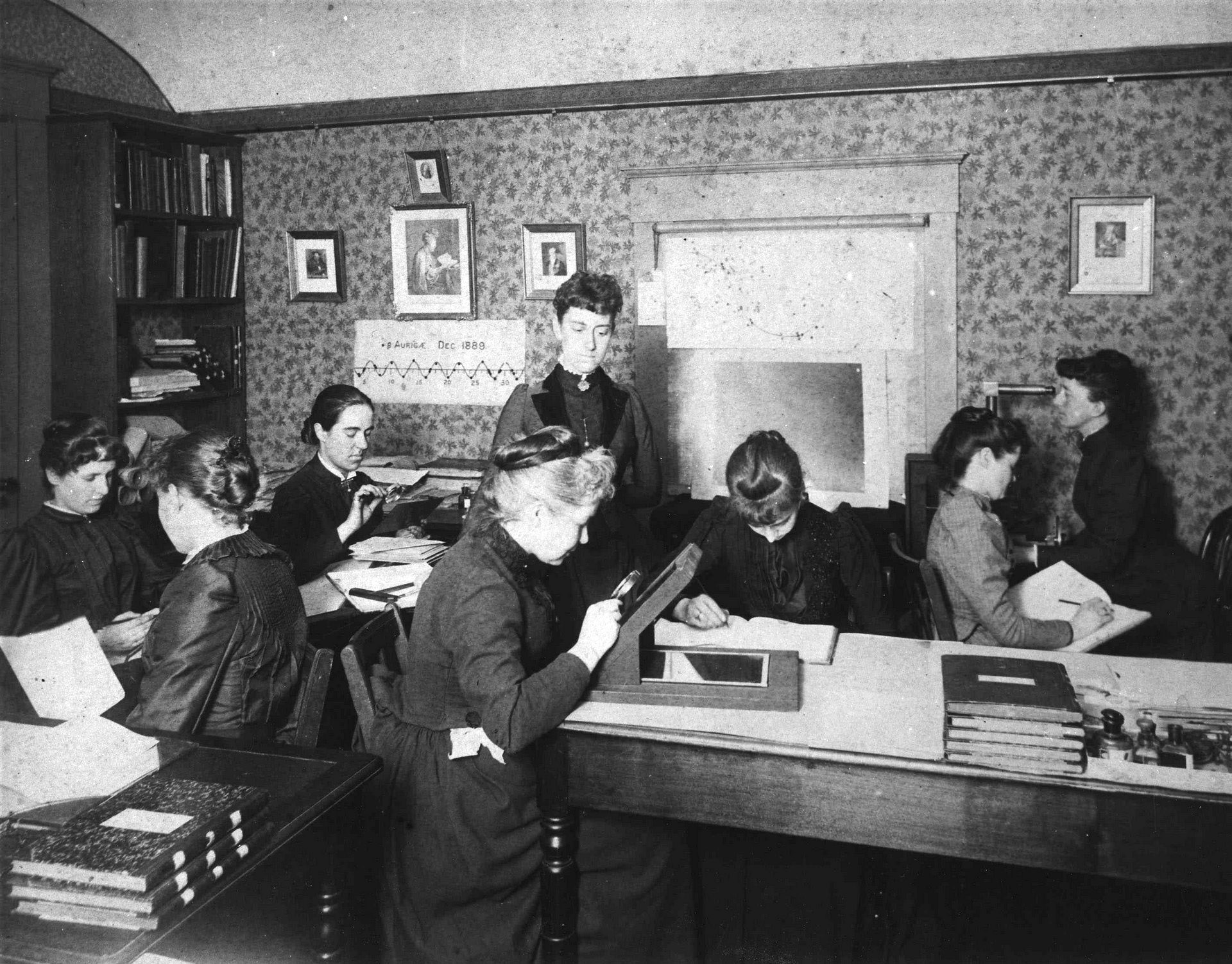
Henrietta Leavitt (third from left) is shown working among "The Harvard Computers" who assisted astronomer Edward Charles Pickering at the Harvard College Observatory. The assistants also included Annie Jump Cannon, Williamina Fleming, and Antonia Maury.

Leavitt also began working as volunteer assistant, one of the "computers" at the Harvard College Observatory. In 1902, she was hired by the director of the observatory, Edward Charles Pickering, to measure and catalog the brightness of stars as they appeared in the observatory's photographic plate collection. (During Pickering’s time, women at the HCO were not allowed to operate telescopes, but instead checked the scientific data on the photographic plates.)

In 1893, Leavitt obtained credits toward a graduate degree in astronomy for her work at the Harvard College Observatory, but due to chronic illness, she never completed that degree. In 1898, she became a member of the Harvard staff. Leavitt left the observatory to make two trips to Europe and completed a stint as an art assistant at Beloit College in Wisconsin. At this time, she contracted an illness that led to progressive hearing loss. Leavitt gradually became deaf.

== Astronomical career ==
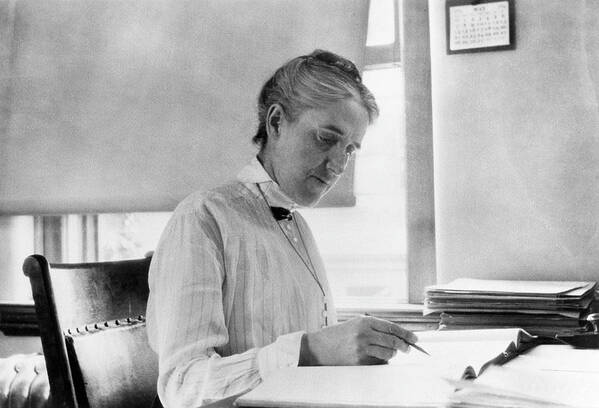
Leavitt working at her desk in the Harvard College Observatory.

Leavitt returned to the Harvard College Observatory in 1903. Because Leavitt was financially independent, Pickering initially did not have to pay her. Later, she received $0.30 (equivalent to $10.75 in 2025) an hour for her work, and only $10.50 (equivalent to $376.25 in 2025) per week. She was reportedly "hard-working, serious-minded …, little given to frivolous pursuits and selflessly devoted to her family, her church, and her career." At the Harvard Observatory, Leavitt worked alongside Annie Jump Cannon, who also was deaf.

Pickering assigned Leavitt to study variable stars of the Small and Large Magellanic Clouds, as recorded on photographic plates taken with the Bruce Astrograph of the Boyden Station of the Harvard Observatory in Arequipa, Peru. She identified 1,777 variable stars. In 1908, Leavitt published the results of her studies in the Annals of the Astronomical Observatory of Harvard College, noting that the brighter variables had the longer period.

Plot from a paper prepared by Leavitt in 1912. The horizontal axis is the logarithm of the period of the corresponding Cepheid, and the vertical axis is its magnitude. The lines drawn connect points corresponding respectively to the stars' minimum and maximum brightness.

In a 1912 paper, Leavitt examined the relationship between the periods and the brightness of a sample of 25 of the Cepheid variables in the Small Magellanic Cloud. The paper was communicated and signed by Edward Pickering, but the first sentence indicates that it was "prepared by Miss Leavitt". Leavitt made a graph of magnitude versus logarithm of period and determined that, in her own words,

A straight line can be readily drawn among each of the two series of points corresponding to maxima and minima, thus showing that there is a simple relation between the brightness of the Cepheid variables and their periods.

Leavitt then used the simplifying assumption that all of the Cepheids within the Small Magellanic Cloud were at approximately the same distance, so that their intrinsic brightness could be deduced from their apparent brightness as registered in the photographic plates, up to a scale factor, since the distance to the Magellanic Clouds was as yet unknown. She expressed the hope that parallaxes to some Cepheids would be measured. This soon occurred, allowing her period-luminosity scale to be calibrated. This reasoning allowed Leavitt to establish that the logarithm of the period is linearly related to the logarithm of the star's average intrinsic optical luminosity (the amount of power radiated by the star in the visible spectrum).

Henrietta found that Delta Cephei was the "standard candle" that had long been sought by astronomers. A similar five-day cepheid variable in the Small Magellanic cloud she found to be about one ten-thousandth as bright as our five-day Delta Cephei. Using the inverse-square law, she calculated that the Small Magellanic Cloud was 100 times as far away as Delta Cephei, thus having discovered a way to calculate the distance to another galaxy.

Leavitt also developed, and continued to refine, the Harvard Standard for photographic measurements, a logarithmic scale that orders stars by brightness greater than 17 magnitudes. She initially analyzed 299 plates from 13 telescopes to construct her scale, which was accepted by the International Committee of Photographic Magnitudes in 1913.

In 1913, Leavitt discovered T Pyxidis, a recurrent nova in the constellation Pyxis, and one of the most frequent recurrent novae in the sky, with eruptions observed in 1890, 1902, 1920, 1944, 1967, and 2011.

Leavitt was a member of Phi Beta Kappa, the American Association of University Women, the American Astronomical and Astrophysical Society, the American Association for the Advancement of Science, and an honorary member of the American Association of Variable Star Observers. In 1921, when Harlow Shapley took over as director of the observatory, Leavitt was made head of stellar photometry. By the end of that year, she had died from cancer.

== Scientific impact ==
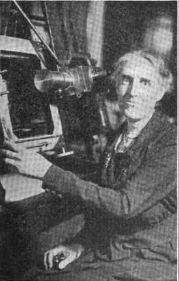
Leavitt making measurements in 1921

According to science writer Jeremy Bernstein, "variable stars had been of interest for years, but when she was studying those plates, I doubt Pickering thought she would make a significant discovery - one that would eventually change astronomy." The period–luminosity relationship for Cepheids, now known as "Leavitt's law", made the stars the first "standard candle" in astronomy, allowing scientists to compute the distances to stars too remote for stellar parallax observations to be useful. One year after Leavitt reported her results, Ejnar Hertzsprung determined the distance of several Cepheids in the Milky Way; with this calibration, the distance to any Cepheid could be determined accurately.

Cepheids were soon detected in other galaxies, such as Andromeda (notably by Edwin Hubble in 1923–24), and they became an important part of the evidence that "spiral nebulae" are independent galaxies located far outside of the Milky Way. Thus, Leavitt's discovery would forever change humanity's picture of the universe, as it prompted Harlow Shapley to move the Sun from the center of the galaxy in the "Great Debate" and Edwin Hubble to move the Milky Way galaxy from the center of the universe.

Leavitt's discovery of an accurate way to measure distances on an intergalactic scale paved the way for modern astronomy's understanding of the structure and scale of the universe. The accomplishments of Edwin Hubble, the American astronomer who established that the universe is expanding, were also made possible by Leavitt's groundbreaking research.

Hubble often said that Leavitt deserved the Nobel Prize for her work. Mathematician Gösta Mittag-Leffler, a member of the Swedish Academy of Sciences, tried to nominate her for that prize in 1924, only to learn that she had died of cancer three years earlier. (The Nobel Prize is not awarded posthumously.)

Cepheid variables allow astronomers to measure distances up to about 60 million light-years. Even greater distances can now be measured by using the theoretical maximum mass of white dwarfs calculated by Subrahmanyan Chandrasekhar.

== Illness and death ==
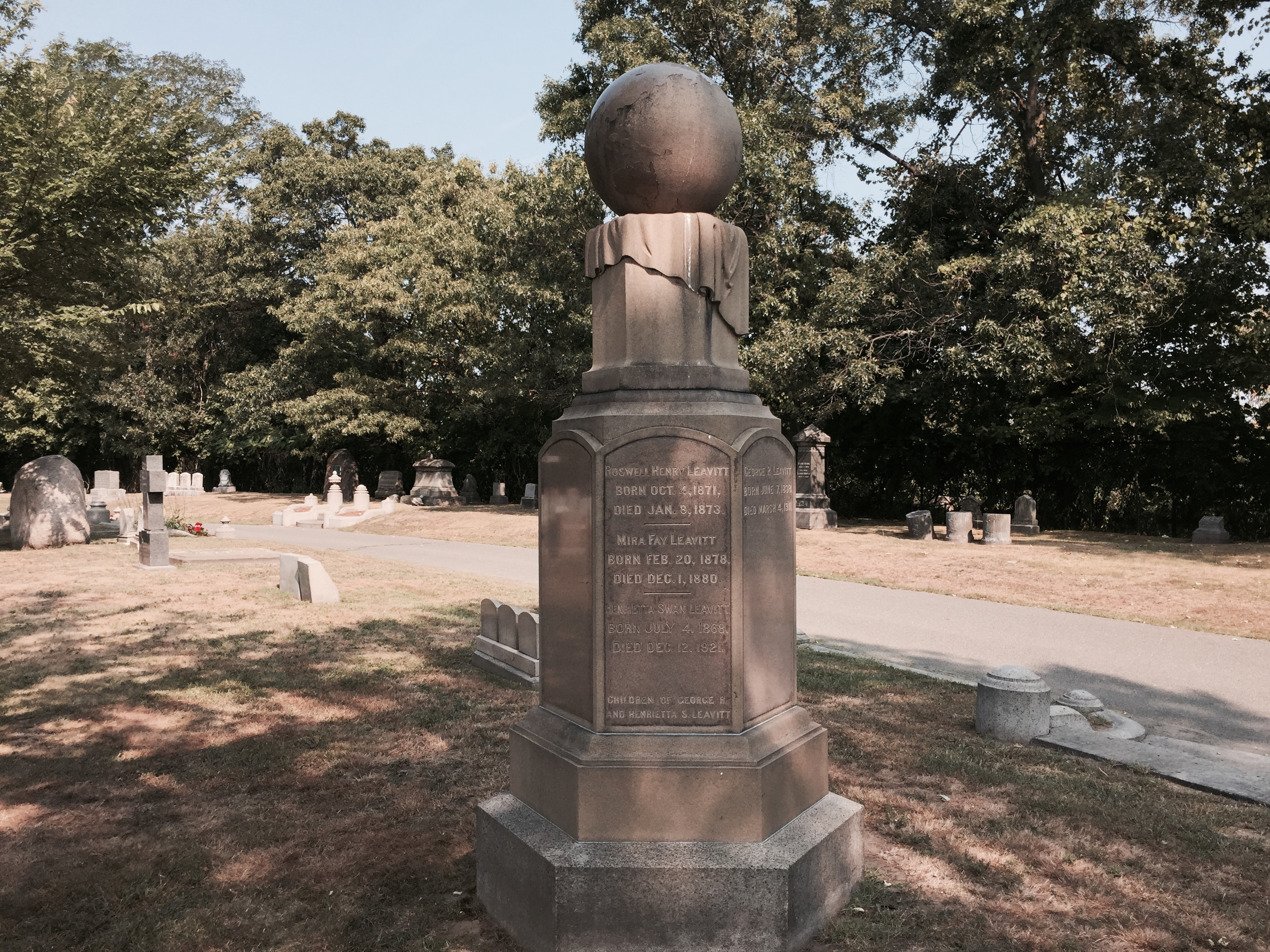
The Leavitt family monument in Cambridge Cemetery

Leavitt's scientific work at Harvard was frequently interrupted by illness and family obligations. Her early death at the age of 53, from stomach cancer, was seen as a tragedy by her colleagues for reasons that went beyond her scientific achievements. Her colleague Solon Irving Bailey wrote in his obituary for Leavitt that "she had the happy, joyful, faculty of appreciating all that was worthy and lovable in others, and was possessed of a nature so full of sunshine that, to her, all of life became beautiful and full of meaning."

She was buried in the Leavitt family plot at Cambridge Cemetery in Cambridge, Massachusetts. "Sitting at the top of a gentle hill," writes George Johnson in his biography of Leavitt, "the spot is marked by a tall hexagonal monument, on top of which sits a globe cradled on a draped marble pedestal. Her uncle Erasmus Darwin Leavitt and his family also are buried there, along with other Leavitts." A plaque memorializing Henrietta and her two siblings, Mira and Roswell, is mounted on one side of the monument. Nearby are the graves of Henry and William James.

== Posthumous honors ==
- The asteroid 5383 Leavitt and the crater Leavitt on the Moon are named after her to honor deaf men and women who have worked as astronomers.
- One of the ASAS-SN telescopes, located in the McDonald Observatory in Texas, is named in her honor.

== In popular culture ==
Anna Von Mertens designed a book-based work of art, Attention Is Discovery: The Life and Legacy of Henrietta Leavitt. The pages weave Von Mertens' artistic interpretations of Leavitt's work with photos and descriptions of the work of Leavitt and her fellow Harvard Computers.

George Johnson wrote a 2005 biography, Miss Leavitt's Stars, which showcases the triumphs of women's progress in science through the story of Leavitt.

Robert Burleigh wrote the 2013 biography Look Up!: Henrietta Leavitt, Pioneering Woman Astronomer for a younger audience. It is written for four- to eight-year-olds.

The eighth episode of Neil deGrasse Tyson's Cosmos: A Spacetime Odyssey, titled "Sisters of the Sun", features Leavitt and partly focuses on her fellow Harvard Computers.

Lauren Gunderson wrote a 2015 play, Silent Sky, which followed Leavitt's journey from her acceptance at Harvard to her death.

Theo Strassell wrote a play, The Troubling Things We Do, an absurdist piece that details the life of Henrietta Leavitt, among other scientists from her era.

Dava Sobel's book The Glass Universe chronicles the work of the women analyzing images taken of the stars at the Harvard College Observatory.

The BBC included Leavitt in their Missed Genius series designed to celebrate individuals from diverse backgrounds who have had a profound effect on our world.

Central Square Theater commissioned a play, The Women Who Mapped The Stars, by Joyce Van Dyke, as part of the Brit D'Arbeloff Women in Science Production Series, staged by the Nora Theatre Company. The play features Leavitt's story, among others.

Poet Jessy Randall included a tribute to Leavitt in her 2025 collection of poems about women scientists, The Path of Most Resistance.

== See also ==
- List of female scientists
- List of deaf people
- Women in science
- Timeline of women in science
- Human computer
- Cepheids
