= Maria Celeste (disambiguation) =

Maria Celeste (born Virginia Gamba) was a Roman Catholic nun, and also the illegitimate daughter of the Italian scientist Galileo Galilei.

Maria Celeste may also refer to:

- Maria Celeste (crater), a crater on Venus named after Galileo's daughter
- María Celeste (film), a 1945 Argentine film directed by Julio Saraceni
- María Celeste (telenovela), a Venezuelan telenovela from 1994

== People ==
- María Celeste Arrarás (born 1960), Puerto Rican journalist
- María Celeste Giménez Navarro (born 1987), Argentine politician
- Maria Celeste Nardini (1920–2020), an Italian politician
- Giulia Crostarosa (1696–1755), an Italian Roman Catholic nun who took the religious name Maria Celeste

== See also ==
- Mary Celeste, sometimes mistakenly called Maria Celeste, a noted 19th-century sailing ship found abandoned
