= William Gould =

William Gould may refer to:

- William Gould (naturalist) (1715–1799), English cleric and naturalist
- William Buelow Gould (1801–1853), Australian convict and painter
- William Gould (actor) (1886–1969), American actor
- William B. Gould (1837–1923), escaped slave and veteran of the American Civil War
- William B. Gould IV, American lawyer and law professor
- William Monk Gould (1856–1923), British composer of light music
- William Tracy Gould (1799–1882), American lawyer and founder of the Augusta Law School
- William S. Baring-Gould (1913–1967), Sherlock Holmes scholar
- William Gould (aka William O'Brien), one of the Manchester Martyrs
- Billy Gould (born 1963), American musician and producer, member of Faith No More
- Willie Gould (1886–?), English footballer for Bradford City and Manchester City
- Billy Gould (comedian) (1869–1950), American vaudeville comedian

== See also ==
- William Gould Dow (1895–1999), American scientist
- William Gould Newman, politician
- William Gould Young (1902–1980), chemist and professor
