= Galileo's Dream =

2009 science fiction novel by Kim Stanley Robinson

- Author: Kim Stanley Robinson
- Cover artist: Chris White
- Language: English
- Genre: Science fiction novel
- Publisher: HarperVoyager (Commonwealth); Bantam Spectra/Random House (US)
- Publication date: August 6, 2009
- Publication place: United States
- Media type: Print (hardcover)
- Pages: 584
- ISBN: 978-0-00-726031-7
- OCLC: 320406645

Galileo's Dream (2009) is a science fiction novel with elements of historical fiction, written by Kim Stanley Robinson. In the book, 17th-century scientist Galileo Galilei is visited by far-future time travelers living on the Galilean moons of Jupiter. Italicized portions of text within the novel are "mostly from Galileo's writing or that of his contemporaries."

The novel was published in hardcover on August 6, 2009, in the United Kingdom and on December 29, 2009, in the United States. It received generally favorable reviews.

== Development ==
Robinson first became interested in Galileo while researching an earlier alternate history novel, The Years of Rice and Salt.

== Synopsis ==
The novel's action moves back and forth between Renaissance Italy and the Jovian moons of the 32nd century, a utopian society where humans live for centuries and violence is virtually unknown. It is narrated by Cartophilus, a Jovian time-traveller who has assumed an identity as one of Galileo's servants.

Galileo is visited by Ganymede, a time traveler who transports him to 32nd century Europa. Ganymede hopes that Galileo will aid his campaign to stop the Europans from entering the moon's subsurface ocean and communicating with the intelligent entity that inhabits it. Hera, another Jovian, warns Galileo that Ganymede does not have his best interests at heart. Ganymede gives Galileo a drug that makes him forget what has happened, before returning him to his own time.

On further trips, Galileo learns more about the Jovians' culture, science, and history. Hera warns Galileo that he will be burnt at the stake unless he comes to understand the events of his life better—in particular, his interactions with women and the privileged position he has occupied in a patriarchal society. Through futuristic technology, Galileo relives his relationships with his domineering mother and his mistress Marina Gamba, as well as other events of his life.

It is revealed that Ganymede hopes to manipulate Galileo into being martyred for science, believing that this will increase the power of science and reduce the suffering that humanity endured in the centuries after Galileo's life. Ganymede injures the Europan intelligence, believing that contact with a vastly superior entity will throw humanity into existential despair. The characters learn that Jupiter itself is an intelligent entity, as are the sun and stars. Galileo and Hera share an experience of transcendental oneness with the universe. They decide to travel back in time once more, to undo Ganymede's assault on the Europan alien.

In between these dimly-remembered trips to the future, Galileo conducts scientific investigations and tries to find a way to publish his heliocentric findings without running afoul of the Inquisition. Cartophilus and a few other time-travellers do their best to aid him behind the scenes. He sends his illegitimate (and thus unmarriageable) daughters to live in a convent of the Poor Clares, where they live constrained lives and are poorly fed, despite his efforts to supply the convent with food grown in his garden. Galileo is eventually brought to trial for heresy, found guilty, and sentenced to house arrest—a humiliating punishment, but far lighter than the sentence of death he could have faced. For a time he finds joy in a domestic life shared with his beloved daughter Maria Celeste, but she dies of dysentery (aggravated by her poor diet) in the last years of his life. Cartophilus, who lives to see further centuries of human suffering and violence, eulogizes Galileo and urges the reader to emulate his dedication to describing reality as he saw it: "Push like Galileo pushed! And together we may crab sideways toward the good."

== Reception ==
Robinson was praised for depicting Galileo with both greatness and weaknesses, as well as for handling themes such as the relation between human memory and perception of time. The author Michelle West praised the book as "incredibly moving and provocative," in contrast to the "somewhat distant or cerebral" feel of Robinson's previous books. A short review in New Scientist praised the book's historical elements but judged that its science fiction elements added little. The novel was included on Library Journal's list of the year's best genre fiction.

Adam Roberts described the book as an homage to Johannes Kepler's Somnium, sometimes identified as the first science fiction novel.

Writing in The Guardian, Alison Flood noted that Galileo's Dream was the first of Robinson's novels to feature time travel or aliens.

The media studies scholar Sherryl Vint published an article about the novel in the journal Configurations, putting it into dialogue with ideas from science studies and Fredric Jameson's conception of utopia: "Just as Galileo shows readers what is valuable in continuing to see the sacred in the natural world—a perspective lost by the story we tell of the scientific revolution—so Hera and her amodern ideologies show Galileo that science was never separate from the social world of patriarchy."
