= Kingswood House School =

- Epsom, Surrey; United Kingdom

Information
- Type: Private school
- Established: 1899
- Headmaster: Matthew Bryan
- Colors: Emerald Green and White
- Website: www.kingswoodhouse.org

Map of the UK showing the location of Kingswood House School at 51.33364°N, 0.27885°W (grid reference TQ200608)

Kingswood House School is a private school in Epsom, Surrey in the United Kingdom. It was founded in 1899 and moved to its present site in West Hill in 1920. In September 2021 it opened its doors to girls and became co-educational from Reception to GCSE (16 years). The School is a member of the Independent Association of Preparatory Schools (IAPS) and Society of Heads - with a current roll of approximately 250 pupils.

In 2016, the school added a new Senior Department, for boys aged 13 to 16. In 2018, the school started work on a new planned senior block to be completed by September. The building was officially opened in March 2019 with the building being named after former headmaster, Peter Brooks. The DT Room had a refit in Autumn 2019 and a new Astro turf and teaching hub were completed in September 2021 alongside enhanced facilities for girls now attending the school.

In addition to the sporting life of the school, pupils compete in external competitions.

The school took part in a national competition for environmental problem solving sponsored by the World Wide Fund for Nature.

== Headmasters ==
- Revd Sandberg
- Mr Dixon
- Mr Morley-Tabor
- Mr Malden
- William (Bill) H Thorne
- Christopher Scott-Malden (Mr Chris)
- Mark Harvey
- Peter Brooks
- Duncan Murphy
- Liam Clark (Interim Headmaster)
- Matthew Bryan

== Notable alumni ==
- Quentin Crisp
- Cecil Gould
- Richard Rogers, architect.
- Nicholas Witchell
