= Marina Gamba =

Italian woman of the 17th century

Marina Gamba of Venice (c. 1570 in Venice – 21 August 1612 in Padua) was the mother of Galileo Galilei's illegitimate children.

== Relationship with Galileo Galilei ==
During one of his frequent trips to Venice, Galileo met a young woman named Marina, daughter of Andrea Gamba, and started a relationship with her. She moved into his house in Padua and bore him three children: Virginia (16 August 1600 – 1634), later Sister Maria Celeste; Livia (1601–1659), later Sister Arcangela; and Vincenzo (1606–1649). In none of the three baptismal records is Galileo named as the father. Virginia was described as "daughter by fornication of Marina of Venice," with no mention of the father; on Livia's baptismal record the name of the father was left blank; Vincenzo's baptismal record announced "father uncertain" (Galileo's Daughter 24, Dava Sobel, 1999). Galileo's position as a professor and his many friendships among the Venetian nobility probably made it unwise for him to figure officially as the children's father.

When Galileo left Padua for good in 1610 to take up his position at the Medici court in Florence, he took the two daughters with him but left their mother behind with 4 year-old Vincenzo, who joined his father in Florence a few years later.

With Marina no longer in the family, Galileo put his two daughters in a convent and managed to have Vincenzo legitimated by the Grand Duke of Tuscany. In his 1619 request for this, Galileo declared that at the time of his cohabitation with Marina, she "had never been married" and was "already dead" at the drawing up of the act. Vincenzo studied law and later became a lutenist like his namesake grandfather. He died in 1649.

== Confusion with Marina Bartoluzzi ==
Marina Gamba is often confused with Marina Bartoluzzi, who looked after Vincenzo while Galileo was settling in Florence, resorting to the sale of a lute to pay for her services. She was long believed to have remarried to a certain Giovanni Bartoluzzi, but it has been proven that they were two different persons.
