= Cecil Gould =

British art historian

- Born: Cecil Hilton Monk Gould; 24 May 1918; United Kingdom of Great Britain and Ireland
- Died: 7 April 1994 (aged 75)
- Occupations: Art historian, curator
- Relatives: Rupert Gould (father); Muriel Estall (mother); Jocelyne Stacey (sister)

Cecil Hilton Monk Gould (24 May 1918 – 7 April 1994) was a British art historian and curator who specialised in Renaissance painting. He was a former Keeper and deputy director of the National Gallery in London. During World War 2, Gould was one of the Monuments Men.

== Life ==
Born in London in 1918, Gould was the son of Admiralty Lieutenant-Commander Rupert Gould, the restorer of John Harrison's chronometers and well-known panellist of the BBC's "Brains Trust" programme during WWII, and Muriel Estall. Gould was educated at Kingswood House preparatory school, near Epsom, and then at Westminster School. When he was nine, Gould's mother permanently separated from his father and raised Cecil and his sister Jocelyne. After leaving school he began studying at the Courtauld Institute in 1939, although he was not able to complete his degree due to the outbreak of World War II.

During the Second World War he served as Pilot Officer Gould in R.A.F. Intelligence, first in Egypt from 1941 to 1943 and then in Normandy, France. In early 1945 he was transferred to the Monuments, Fine Arts, and Archives program under the Civil Affairs and Military Government Sections of the Allied armies, which was established in 1943 to help protect cultural property in war areas during and after World War II. The group of approximately 400 service members and civilians, known commonly as the "Monuments Men", worked with military forces to safeguard historic and cultural monuments from war damage, and as the conflict came to a close, to find and return works of art and other items of cultural importance that had been stolen by the Nazis or hidden for safekeeping. During the war Gould's sister Jocelyne worked at Bletchley Park.

After the war, he joined the National Gallery staff in 1946 and worked there until his retirement in 1987. He was Keeper and deputy director for the last five years of his tenure. Upon retiring from the National Gallery he moved to Thorncombe in West Dorset. He was a prolific author, publishing many books and articles during his career.

In 1970, Gould established that the National Gallery's Portrait of Pope Julius II was the prime version by Raphael and not a copy, as had previously been thought. He was also responsible for a new attribution of a work to Michelangelo.

In his last years Gould lived with his younger sister Jocelyne Stacey in the village of Thorncombe, Dorset. Towards the end of his life, with his health declining, Cecil was made a correspondant (foreign associate) of the Institut de France. He developed a brain tumour and, after a short illness, died on 7 April 1994. Gould never married and was survived by Jocelyne.

A collection of Gould's large-format black-and-white photographs of Islamic architecture in Cairo, taken during World War II, is in the RIBA library. Other photographs taken by Gould are held in the Conway Library at the Courtauld Institute and are currently being digitised.

Gould was portrayed during his childhood in the 2000 Channel 4 television drama about John Harrison's chronometers, Longitude. He was played by child actor Joe Williams.

== Partial bibliography ==
- The Sixteenth Century Venetian School 1959, (National Gallery Catalogue Series)
- The Sixteenth Century Italian Schools (excluding the Venetian) 1962, (National Gallery Catalogue Series)
  - The last two were revised and combined as: The Sixteenth Century Italian Schools 1975, (National Gallery Catalogue Series) ISBN 978-0-947645-22-9
- Trophy of Conquest: The Musee Napoleon and the Creation of the Louvre 1965, Faber & Faber
- Michelangelo: Battle of Cascina 1966, University of Newcastle upon Tyne
- Titian 1969, Hamlyn
- (with Martin Davies) French School: Early 19th Century Impressionists, Post-Impressionists etc. 1970, (National Gallery Catalogue Series)
- Leonardo: The Artist and the Non-Artist 1975, Weidenfeld and Nicolson ISBN 978-0-297-77000-8
- The Paintings of Correggio 1978, Cornell University Press
- Bernini in France: An Episode in Seventeenth Century History 1981, Weidenfeld and Nicolson ISBN 978-0-297-77944-5
- Parmigianino 1995, Abbeville Press ISBN 978-1-55859-892-8

== Sources ==
- Betts, Jonathan (2006) Time Restored: The Harrison timekeepers and R. T. Gould, the man who knew (almost) everything, Oxford University Press ISBN 0-19-856802-9.
- Levey, Michael (1994) 'Cecil Gould (1918–94)', The Burlington Magazine, Volume 136, 554.
