= Vincenzo Gamba =

Son of Galileo Galilei and Marina Gamba

Vincenzo or Vincenzio Gamba (1606–1649), later Vincenzo Galilei (after 1619), was the illegitimate son of Galileo Galilei (1564–1642) and his mistress Marina Gamba (1570–1612). Vincenzo was legitimated to his father in 1619. Like his grandfather Vincenzo Galilei, the younger Vincenzo became a lutenist.

== Life ==
Vincenzio was born in Padua like his two sisters: Virginia (1600–1634) (later Sister Maria Celeste) and Livia (1601–1659) (later Sister Arcangela).

He was named after his grandfather. In 1619, after his mother's death in 1612, his birth was legitimized by the Grand Duke of Tuscany. As a consequence, the names of the older and younger Vincenzo Galilei became identical, sometimes leading to confusion in biographies.

Vincenzo was particularly gifted in poetry, music, and mechanics. His father encouraged him to study law in Pisa, entrusting him to Benedetto Castelli (1577/1578–1643).

In 1629, he married Sestilia Bocchineri (c. 1610–1669). After his marriage, he quarreled with his father over money. Their relationship later improved and Vincenzo lovingly assisted his father in the last, difficult years of Galileo's life, and helped Galileo build his newly invented escapement.

Galileo's student and biographer, Vincenzo Viviani (1622–1703) mentions Vincenzo Galilei's skill as inventor of musical instruments and in particular his construction of a "lute made with such art that, playing it so excellently, he extracted continuous and goliardic voices from the cords as if they were issuing from an organ's pipes..."
