= Galileo's escapement =

Design for a clock escapement

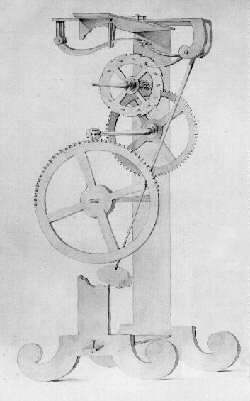
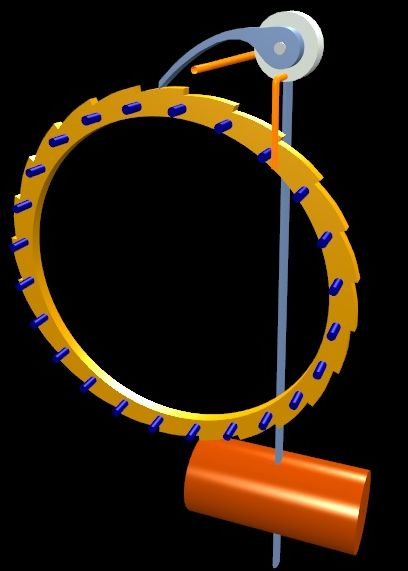
(left) Original drawing from around 1637 of the pendulum clock designed by Galileo, incorporating the escapement. (right) Model of the escapement

Galileo's escapement is a design for a clock escapement, invented around 1637 by Italian scientist Galileo Galilei (1564–1642). Galileo was one of the leading minds of the Scientific Revolution. He was dubbed the founder of theoretical physics. He is also credited with the invention of the celatone (a type of telescope) and the geometric and military compass. Galileo's escapement was the earliest design of a pendulum clock. Since Galileo was by then blind, he described the device to his son Vincenzio, who drew a sketch of it. The son began construction of a prototype, but both he and Galileo died before it was completed.

== Overview ==
Galileo was the first to investigate the timekeeping properties of pendulums, beginning around 1603. His interest was sparked by his discovery that, at least for small swings, the pendulum is isochronous: its period of swing is the same for different size swings. He realized that this property made the pendulum useful for timekeeping. He also discovered that the pendulum's period is dependent on its length, but independent of the mass of the pendulum bob. He used free-swinging pendulums as timers in scientific experiments and for keeping time for music.

In 1637, when he was 73, Galileo had the idea of a mechanism that would keep the pendulum swinging by giving it pushes, an escapement, thus allowing it to be applied to clocks. Since he was by then totally blind, he described the mechanism to his son Vincenzio, who drew a picture from his description. Galileo's student and biographer, Vincenzo Viviani, describes the invention:

One day in 1641, while I was living with him at his villa in Arcetri, I remember that the idea occurred to him that the pendulum could be adapted to clocks with weights or springs, serving in place of the usual tempo, he hoped that the very even and natural motions of the pendulum would correct all the defects in the art of clocks. But because his being deprived of sight prevented him making drawings and models to the desired effect, and his son Vincenzio came one day from Florence to Arcetri, Galileo told him his idea and several discussions followed. Finally, they decided on the scheme shown in the accompanying drawing, to be put in practice to learn the fact of those difficulties in machines which are usually not foreseen in simple theorizing.

The existing clocks of the time, which used the verge escapement with a crude balance wheel, were very inaccurate. The pendulum, due to its isochronism, could be a much better timekeeper.

His son Vincenzio began building a clock, but both he and Galileo died before it was completed. The first pendulum clock was built in 1657 by Christiaan Huygens using a different design. The pendulum clock remained the world's most accurate timekeeper for 300 years, until the 1930s.

Since his time, various working models of Galileo's clock have been built (see picture at top).
