= Longitude (TV series) =

2000 British docudrama miniseries

- Genre: Period drama
- Based on: Longitude by Dava Sobel
- Written by: Charles Sturridge
- Directed by: Charles Sturridge
- Starring: Michael Gambon; Jeremy Irons
- Composer: Geoffrey Burgon
- Country of origin: United Kingdom
- No. of episodes: 2

Production
- Executive producers: Pippa Cross; Delia Fine; Anthony Root
- Producer: Selwyn Roberts
- Cinematography: Peter Hannan
- Editor: Peter Coulson
- Running time: 250 min (UK); 200 min (US)
- Production companies: Granada Television; A&E Network

Original release
- Network: Channel 4
- Release: 2 January – 3 January 2000

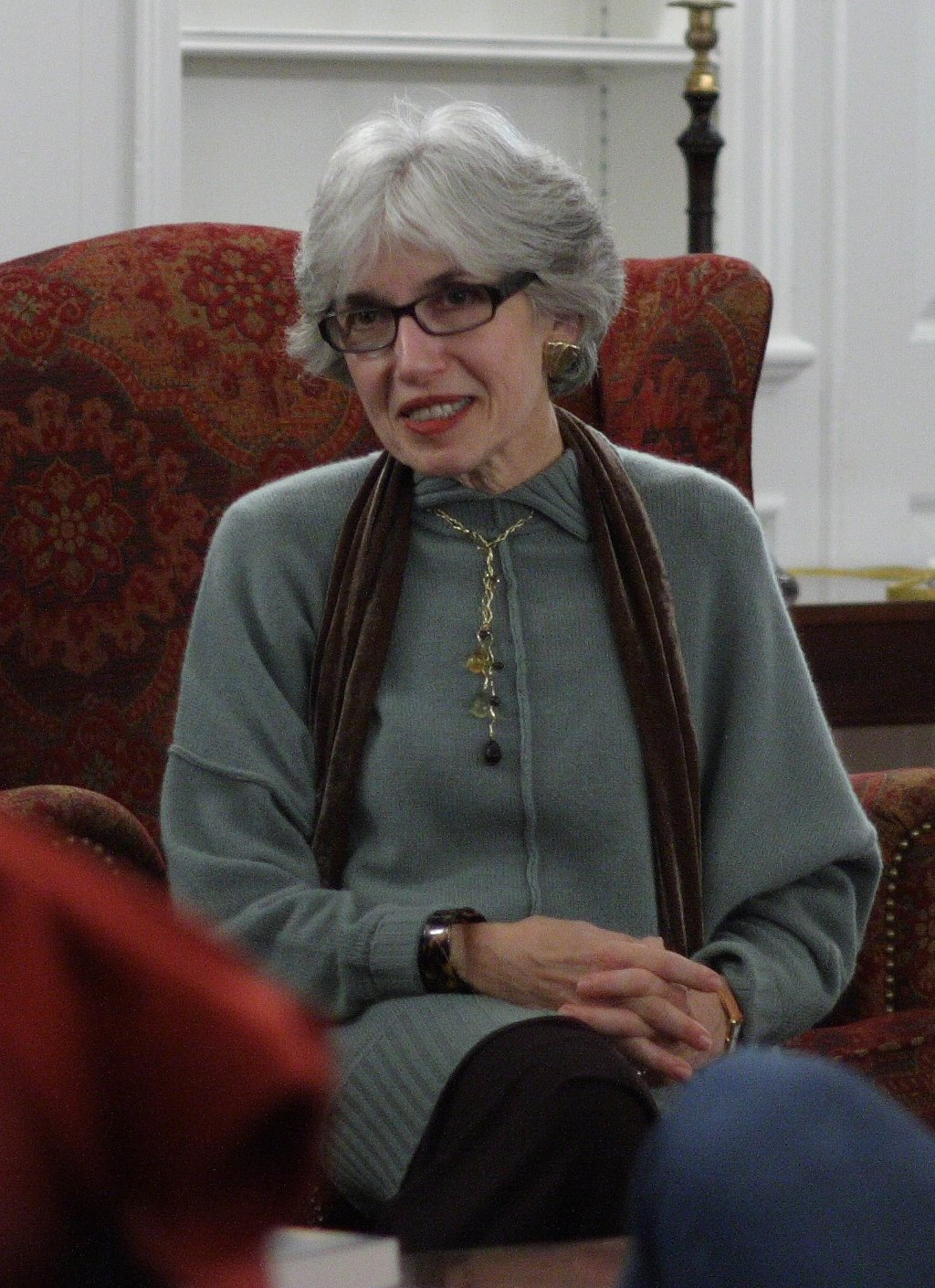
Dava Sobel, 2007

Longitude is a 2000 TV drama produced by Granada Television and the A&E Network for Channel 4, first broadcast between 2 and 3 January 2000 in the UK on Channel 4 and the US on A&E. It is a dramatisation of the 1995 book of the same title by Dava Sobel. It was written and directed by Charles Sturridge and stars Michael Gambon as clockmaker John Harrison (1693–1776) and Jeremy Irons as horologist Rupert Gould (1890–1948).

== Plot ==
Longitude presents the story of Harrison's efforts to develop the marine chronometer and thereby win the Longitude prize in the 18th century. This is interwoven with the story of Gould, a retired naval officer, who is restoring Harrison's four chronometers and popularises his achievements in the early twentieth century.

== Cast ==
18th century
- Jonathan Coy – Adm. Sir Cloudesley Shovell
- Christopher Hodsol – Capt. Ainsley
- John Nettleton – Minister for the Navy
- Michael Gambon – John Harrison
- Nigel Davenport – Sir Charles Pelham
- Liam Jennings – Young William Harrison
- Gemma Jones – Elizabeth Harrison
- John Wood – Sir Edmond Halley
- David Wood – Ditton (based on Humphry Ditton, who died in 1715)
- Mark Tandy – William Whiston
- Stephen Fry – Sir Kenhelm Digby (Based on Kenelm Digby, who died in 1665)
- Tobias Menzies - Halley's Secretary
- Robert Demeger – Observatory porter
- Peter Vaughan – George Graham (clockmaker)
- Sarah Badel – Society lady (George Graham's customer)
- Stephen Simms – James Harrison
- Frank Finlay – Admiral Sir Charles Wager (First Lord of the Admiralty)
- Cliff Parisi – Lt. Draper of HMS Centurion
- Rupert Baker – Lt. Bertie of HMS Centurion
- Andrew Scott – John Campbell of HMS Centurion
- John Standing – Capt. Proctor of HMS Centurion
- Charles Gray – Adm. Balchen (Lisbon)
- Trevor Cooper – Roger Willis of HMS Orford
- William Scott-Masson – Lt. Knorvler of HMS Orford
- William Thomas – Arthur Mason of HMS Orford
- Roger Lloyd-Pack – Capt. Man of HMS Orford
- Ian Burfield – Jos Killick of HMS Orford
- John Quentin – Dr. James Bradley
- Alfred Burke – Rear Admiral
- Peter-Hugo Daly – John Jefferys (clockmaker)
- Ian McNeice – Dr Nathaniel Bliss
- Samuel West – Nevil Maskelyne
- Ian Hart – William Harrison
- Bill Nighy – Lord Sandwich
- Brian Cox – Lord Morton
- Nick Reding – Capt. Campbell of HMS Dorsetshire
- Peter Penry-Jones – Surgeon
- Charles Edwards – Lt. Seward of HMS Deptford
- Clive Francis – Capt. Dudley Digges of HMS Deptford
- Steven Alvey - Learmouth of HMS Deptford
- Ben Jones - Lt. Williams
- Gary Waldhorn – Commodore Forrest
- Colin McCormack - Inn Landlord
- Daragh O'Malley – Capt. William Bourke of HMS Merlin
- Phil Dix - Lt. Bandelwine of HMS Merlin
- Frederick Warder – Bosun of HMS Merlin
- Gavin Molloy / Steven Morphew – Marine (Board of Longitude)
- Tim McInnerny – Christopher Irwin (inventor of the marine chair)
- John Normington – Mr. Greene (astronomer)
- Pip Torrens – Capt. John Lindsay of HMS Tartar
- Frederick Treves – Governor of Barbados
- Rose Keegan - Amy
- Nicholas Rowe – King George
- Heike Makatsch – Queen Charlotte
- John Quayle – Dr. Stephen Demainbray
- T. P. McKenna – Edmund Burke
- Kelvin Cook – Carpenter
- Eliza Darby – Portuguese child
- Duane Fierro – Naval captain
- Daniela Lavender – Courtesan
- Christopher Longman - Lieutenant Chester
- Nick Cherry - Police Officer
20th century
- Jeremy Irons – Rupert Gould
- Clare Moody – Staff nurse
- Clare McCarron - Nurse
- Peter Cartwright – Army doctor
- Anna Chancellor – Muriel Gould
- Joe Williams – Cecil Gould
- Geoffrey Hutchings – Estate manager
- Sophie Millett – Dyson's secretary
- Alec McCowen – Sir Frank Watson Dyson
- Emma Kay - Laura Gurney (Goulds' lodger)
- Michael Cochrane – Waddington, Gould's solicitor
- Barbara Leigh-Hunt – Dodo Gould
- John Leeson – Francis Gray/Uncle Mac - BBC radio producer
- Sasha Hails – BBC PA/Researcher
- Hugh Simon - Doctor
- Rebecca Clay – Observatory assistant
- Richard Janes – Young assistant
- Faith Kent – Lady curator
- Lucy Akhurst – Nurse Grace Ingram
- James Bradshaw – Callboy

== Awards ==
In 2001, Longitude was nominated for the British Academy Television Awards in ten categories, winning in five, including Best Actor (Michael Gambon) and Best Drama Serial.
