= The Glass Universe =

2016 nonfiction book by Dava Sobel

The Glass Universe: How the Ladies of the Harvard Observatory Took the Measure of the Stars
- Author: Dava Sobel
- Language: English
- Publisher: Viking Press
- Publication date: December 6, 2016
- Pages: 336
- ISBN: 978-0-670-01695-2

The Glass Universe: How the Ladies of the Harvard Observatory Took the Measure of the Stars is a 2016 book by Dava Sobel. The book was reviewed in a number of publications.
