= Maria Celeste (crater) =

Crater on Venus

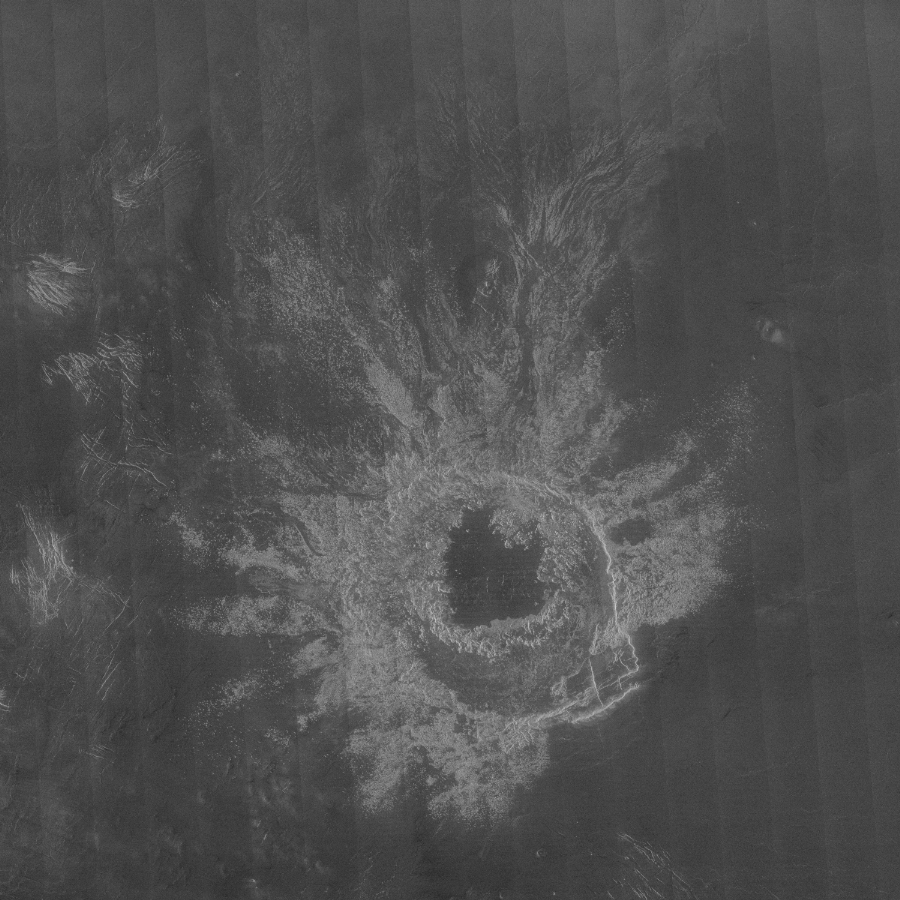
- Radar image of Maria Celeste
- Location: Venus
- Coordinates: 23.4°N 140.4°E
- Diameter: 96.6 km
- Eponym: Maria Celeste

Maria Celeste is an 96.6 km diameter impact crater on the surface of Venus, named in honor of Maria Celeste, the daughter of Galileo Galilei. The name was accepted by the IAU in the year 1991. It has a continuous ejecta radius of 65.3 km, and a wall width of 2.1 km.
