= Longitude (book) =

1995 popular science book

Longitude: The True Story of a Lone Genius Who Solved the Greatest Scientific Problem of His Time
- First edition (US)
- Author: Dava Sobel
- Genre: Popular Science
- Publisher: Walker & Company (US); Fourth Estate (UK)
- Publication date: 1995
- Pages: 191
- ISBN: 978-0-8027-1529-6
- OCLC: 183660066

Longitude: The True Story of a Lone Genius Who Solved the Greatest Scientific Problem of His Time is a 1995 best-selling book by Dava Sobel about John Harrison, an 18th-century clockmaker who created the first clock (chronometer) sufficiently accurate to be used to determine longitude at sea—an important development in navigation. The book was made into a television series entitled Longitude. In 1998, The Illustrated Longitude was published, supplementing the earlier text with 180 images of characters, events, instruments, maps and publications.

== Problem of longitude ==
Determining longitude on land was fairly easy compared to the task at sea. A stable surface to work from, known coordinates to refer to, a sheltered environment for the unstable chronometers of the day, and the ability to repeat determinations over time made for great accuracy.

For calculating longitude at sea however, early ocean navigators had to rely on dead reckoning, or if in sight of land, coastal navigation, which involves triangulating several bearings of the same land feature from different positions. Once out of sight of land, longitude became impossible to calculate, which sometimes led to tragedies in stormy or foggy conditions.

In order to deal with not being able to calculate longitude, captains would sail to the known latitude of their destination, and follow the line of constant latitude home. This was known as running down a westing if westbound, or easting if eastbound. In Farley Mowat's book Westviking, he gives examples from the Norse Sagas of Vikings using this practice to sail reliably from Norway to the Faroes, then Iceland, then Greenland, then North America, and then back to Ireland, with very primitive instruments.

Determining latitude was relatively easy in that it could be found from the altitude of the sun at noon with the aid of a table giving the sun's declination for the day. Latitude can also be determined from night sightings of Polaris, the northern pole star.

Navigating purely by latitude was of course vulnerable if the sun was clouded over at noon, and caused problems as it prevented ships from taking the most direct route, a great circle, or a route with the most favourable winds and currents, extending voyages by days or even weeks. This increased the likelihood of short rations, scurvy or starvation leading to poor health or even death for members of the crew and resultant risk to the ship.

Errors in navigation also resulted in shipwrecks. Motivated by a number of maritime disasters attributable to serious errors in reckoning position at sea, particularly spectacular disasters such as the Scilly naval disaster of 1707 which took Admiral Sir Cloudesley Shovell and four ships of his fleet, the British government established the Board of Longitude in 1714.

"The Discovery of the Longitude is of such Consequence to Great Britain for the safety of the Navy and Merchant Ships as well as for the improvement of Trade that for want thereof many Ships have been retarded in their voyages, and many lost..." and announced the Longitude Prize "for such person or persons as shall discover the Longitude."

The prizes were to be awarded to the first person to demonstrate a practical method for determining the longitude of a ship at sea. Each prize, in increasing amounts, was for solutions of increasing accuracy. These prizes, worth millions of dollars in today's currency, motivated many to search for a solution.

Britain was not alone in the desire to solve the problem. France's King Louis XIV founded the Académie Royale des Sciences in 1666. It was charged with, among a range of scientific activities, the improvement of maps and sailing charts and advancement of the science of navigation. From 1715, the Académie offered one of the two Prix Rouillés specifically for navigation. Spain's Philip II offered a prize for the discovery of a solution to the problem of the longitude in 1567; Philip III increased the prize in 1598. Holland added to the effort with a prize offered in 1636. Navigators and scientists in most European countries were aware of the problem and were involved in finding the solution. Due to the international effort in solving the problem and the scale of the enterprise, it represents one of the largest scientific endeavours in history.

== Knowing longitude ==
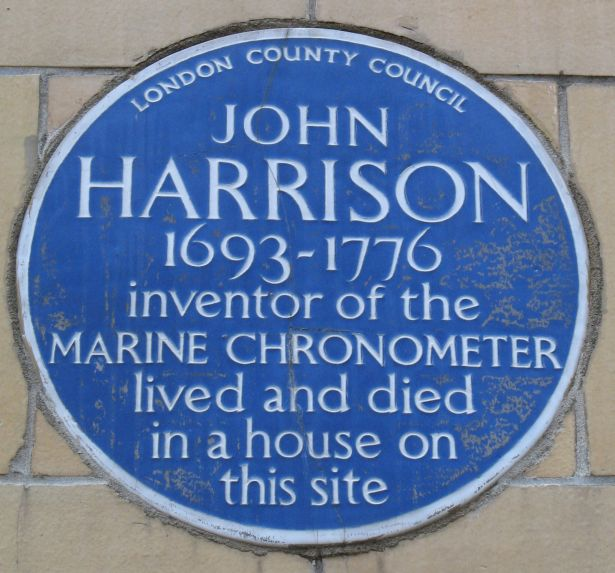
A blue plaque marks the location at Red Lion Square (the original house was demolished) where Harrison lived and died.

As Dava Sobel explains, "To know one's longitude at sea, one needs to know what time it is aboard ship and also the time at the home port or another place of known longitude—at that very same moment. The two clock times enable the navigator to convert the hour difference into geographical separation. Since the earth takes 24 hours to revolve 360 degrees, one hour marks 1/24 of a revolution or 15 degrees. And so each hour's time difference between the ship and starting point marks a progress of fifteen degrees of longitude to the east or west.

"Every day at sea, when the navigator resets his ship's clock to local noon when the sun reaches its highest point in the sky, and then consults the home port clock, every hour's discrepancy between them translates into another fifteen degrees of longitude. One degree of longitude equals four minutes of time the world over, although in terms of distance, one degree shrinks from 60.15 nautical miles or 111 km [Earth's circumference being 21,653.521 nautical miles, or 24,901.55 statute miles at the Equator], to virtually nothing at the poles.

"Precise knowledge of the hour in two different places at once—a longitude prerequisite so easily accessible today from any pair of cheap wristwatches—was utterly unattainable up to and including the era of pendulum clocks. On the deck of a rolling ship such clocks would slow down, or speed up, or stop running altogether. Normal changes of temperature encountered en route from a cold country of origin to a tropical trade zone thinned or thickened a clock's lubricating oil and made its metal parts expand or contract with equally disastrous results. A rise or fall in barometer pressure, or the subtle variations in the Earth's gravity from one latitude to another, could also cause a clock to gain or lose time."

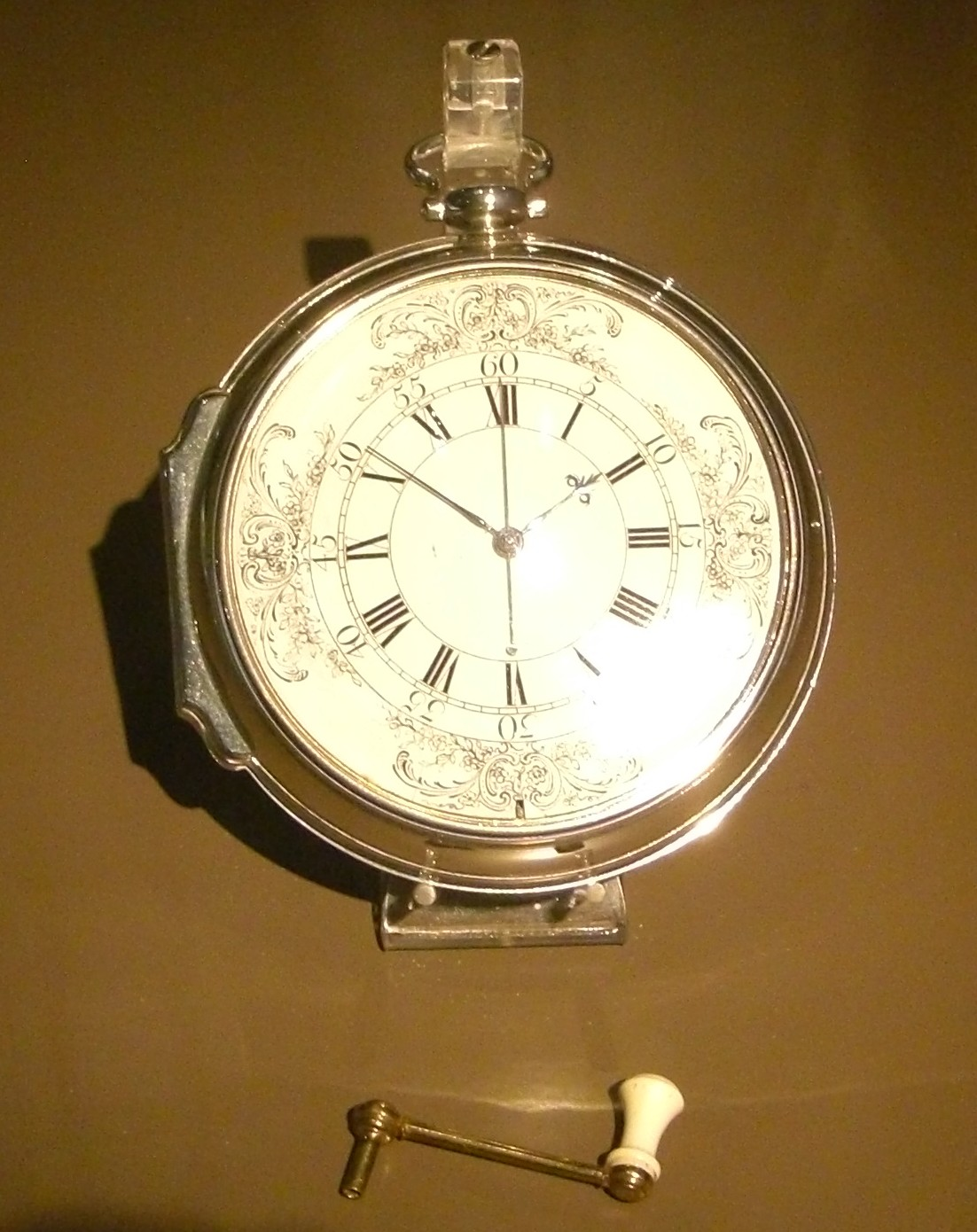
Harrison's final triumph - the compact chronometer

Before the 18th century, ocean navigators could not find an accurate way of determining longitude. A practical solution came from a gifted carpenter, John Harrison, who solved one of the most difficult problems of his time by creating an accurate chronometer. The best scientists of the time, including Sir Isaac Newton, thought it impossible. Harrison spent four decades perfecting a watch that would earn him compensation from Parliament and longitude rewards thanks to the recognition and influence of King George III of Great Britain.

== Recognition ==
- British Book of the Year, 1997
- Modern Library 100 Best Nonfiction, 26th on the Readers List
- American Academy of Arts and Letters Harold D. Vursell Memorial Award, 1999
- Le Prix Faubert du Coton
- Il Premio del Mare Circeo
- Royal Society Prizes for Science Books, 1997 (Shortlisted)
- American Library Association Non-fiction Outstanding Books for the College Bound and Lifelong Learners, 1999
- American Library Association Outstanding Books for the College Bound and Lifelong Learners, Science and Technology, 2004

In recognition for Longitude, Sobel was named as a fellow of the American Geographical Society.

Historians of science and technology have raised some criticisms of the book, particularly for its creation of heroes and villains, suggestion that astronomical and timekeeping methods of finding longitude were rivals rather than complementary, simplification of the processes of technological innovation and Anglocentrism.

== Film adaptations ==
- Nova Online: Lost at Sea, the Search for Longitude
- Longitude (TV series)

== See also ==
- American Practical Navigator
- Cardinal direction
- Geodetic system
- Geographic coordinate system
- Geotagging
- Great-circle distance
- History of longitude
- Latitude
- Lunar distance (navigation)
- Prime meridian
- Sextant
- World Geodetic System
- John Harrison
