= Anna Von Mertens =

American artist (born 1973)

- Born: 1973 (age 52–53); Boston, MA
- Education: Brown University (BA) California College of the Arts (MFA)
- Website: annavonmertens.com

Anna Von Mertens (born in 1973) is an American artist who uses traditional quilting methods and textile processes to create conceptual art. In the past, some of her quilts have been displayed on flat surfaces, but she also displays them on the walls. After envisioning the pattern to be designed on the quilt, she uses digital technology to create the design concept for the quilt's pattern on the computer. In order to bring her work to life, Von Mertens hand-dyes the patterns onto her fabrics. Additionally, Von Mertens hand stitches each quilt, and the process of stitching one quilt project can take months to complete. She currently resides in Peterborough, New Hampshire. Her work has been shown nationally and internationally including the Smithsonian Institution, The National Museum of Art, Architecture and Design in Oslo, Norway, the Museum of Fine Arts Boston and Ballroom Marfa.

== Themes and patterns ==
Despite beginning her quilt-making career using clothes from the Salvation Army, Von Mertens found satisfaction in creating quilts inspired by "odd avenues of knowledge and inquiry." More specifically, one can view her work as a combination of art, science and history. For example, in one of her series, As the Stars Go By, Von Merten's hand-stitched a pattern of star rotation serves as a way to document violent moments in American history. She has stated of the series, "The work is intended to act on many levels: as a memorial, as an actual vantage from a specific moment in history, but ultimately I am simply documenting an impassive natural cycle that is oblivious to the violence below."

Other prominent themes that take form in the patterns she uses include the dispersion of nuclear energy, hidden topographies, and migration routes of humans and birds. In an interview, Von Mertens states, "These patterns reveal to me aspects of our existence whether it is how we experience time and face the infinite- embedded in that is our own mortality- or how the boundary of the body is presented to others versus how it is felt internally." The pieces use various methods of measurement and data sources including tree ring growth charts, star charts and imagery of magnetic poles. One series included an investigation of the idea of aura specifically visualized through aura photographs. Using a hand dying method, Von Mertens created her aura works based on well-known or significant art historical paintings. She has described the process of hand-switching the work as a measurement of time that situates the individual within the broader universe. The process involves chalking the lines, hand stitching and sometimes hand-dying the pieces. In some works the dye is painted onto the fabric. In addition to being connected to contemporary craft and conceptual art Von Metern's work is also often categorized as data art and within cartography and mapping practices.

== Awards ==
- 2010: United States Artists Simon Fellowship
- 2007: Louis Comfort Tiffany Foundation Biennial Award recipient
- 2002: MacDowell Colony Artist in Residence, New Hampshire Committee Fellowship
- 2001-2002: Affiliate Artist, Headlands Center for the Arts (Suasalito, CA)
- 2000: M.F.A. Studio Award Recipient, Headlands Center for the Arts (Suasalito, CA)
