= William Monk Gould =

British composer

William Monk Gould (24 October 1858–7 April 1923) was a British composer of light music: his popular song The Curfew (1898) was particularly well-known.

Monk was born in Tavistock, becoming organist at Rye parish church when only 12 years old. He later served as organist and choirmaster at St Michael's Church, Portsmouth. He published 56 compositions between 1883 and 1920. He married Agnes Hilton Skinner (died 1937), and they had a son, Rupert Gould who achieved fame as a horologist and scientific broadcaster. Another son was Henry Hilton Monk Gould.

He died 7 April 1923 in Portsmouth.
