= Galileo's Daughter =

1999 book by Dava Sobel

Galileo's Daughter: A Historical Memoir of Science, Faith, and Love
- First edition (US)
- Author: Dava Sobel
- Language: English
- Genre: Non-fiction
- Publisher: Walker & Company (US); Fourth Estate (UK)
- Publication date: 1999
- Media type: Print (hardback)
- ISBN: 0-8027-1343-2
- OCLC: 41284975
- Dewey Decimal: 520/.92 B 21
- LC Class: QB36.G2 S65 1999

Galileo's Daughter: A Historical Memoir of Science, Faith, and Love is a book by Dava Sobel published in 1999. It is based on the surviving letters of Galileo Galilei's daughter, the nun Suor Maria Celeste, and explores the relationship between Galileo and his daughter. It was nominated for the 2000 Pulitzer Prize for Biography or Autobiography.

== Historical background ==
Virginia Galilei (1600–1634) was Galileo's first child, born in Padua, Italy. Galileo never married the mother of his three children, meaning they were all born illegitimate. With little prospect of marriage for his two daughters due to their illegitimacy, Galileo sent Virginia and her sister, at the age of thirteen and twelve respectively, to live in the San Matteo Convent, Arcetri, for the rest of their lives. Virginia adopted the veil in 1616, changing her name to Suor Maria Celeste.

Maria Celeste maintained contact with her father throughout her entire life through letters. Although none of Galileo's letters are known to have survived, 120 of Maria Celeste's exist. These letters, written from 1623 to 1634, depict a woman with incredible brilliance, industry, sensibility and a deep love for her father. Maria Celeste died of dysentery in 1634.

== Storyline ==
Galileo's Daughter takes place in the late 16th and 17th century in Italy and through their letters to each other, details the close relationship between Galileo and his daughter Suor Maria Celeste. Written in endearing tones and using complimentary titles to address him, Maria Celeste's letters show the great love and respect she had for her father. Furthermore, contact with her father allowed her news of the outside world, as she herself was isolated within the convent. But the letters between Maria Celeste and Galileo served more than to maintain contact – she also had a genuine interest in her father's scientific work, sometimes even offering her own opinion on an issue. Additionally, Galileo's personal life is glimpsed as he and his daughter discuss various details regarding the running of the household, remedies for health and other family matters.

Additionally, the book chronicles some of Galileo's scientific work. Galileo's astronomical discoveries, Dava Sobel claims, led him to adopt the Copernican system, in which the Sun is the center of the Solar System with all the planets orbiting it. However, according to the standard cosmology at that time, as developed by Aristotle and Ptolemy the Earth was the center of the universe and was stationary. When Galileo wished to publish a book which argued for the Copernican system, he attained the required stamp of approval from the religious authority (a requirement for all books published in Italy at the time). The work, the Dialogue Concerning the Two Chief World Systems, was denounced to the Roman Inquisition. Following inquisitorial hearings, Galileo's work was condemned for violating conditions on the original permission to publish and for proposing heliocentrism as reality rather than as hypothesis. The Inquisition required him to renounce heliocentrism and promise to neither teach or write about it any longer. Galileo returned to Florence and continued to lead a pious life as a Catholic. He continued his research but now on matters only indirectly related to heliocentrism, which in fact were quite necessary for a full scientific revision of the cosmos to heliocentrism. While the state of research by the middle of the seventeenth century did not absolutely prove the heliocentric system, the Ptolemaic system had lost all credibility, and more traditional astronomers looked to alternatives such as that provided by Tycho Brahe as a more rational blend of old and new models.

Besides being a biography of Galileo and his daughter, the book describes Galileo's scientific work. In addition to Galileo's well-known enhancements and use of the telescope and his conviction of the correctness of the Copernican system, he had many other scientific achievements. Dava Sobel claims he discovered and investigated sunspots, which again did not bring him much favor with the Church, which, she claims, held the Aristotelian beliefs of the heavens containing only perfect unchanging celestial spheres. He improved the compass and developed a rudimentary thermometer. He devoted the last ten years of his life to the study of bodies in motion, laying the groundwork for Isaac Newton's laws of motion formalized in the next decades. Perhaps his greatest achievement was his promulgation of experimental science, the cornerstone of the scientific method, as his Aristotelian predecessors in science claimed something is true simply because it is obvious.

== See also ==
- Galileo affair
