= Maria Celeste =

Daughter of Galileo Galilei and Marina Gamba (1600–1634)

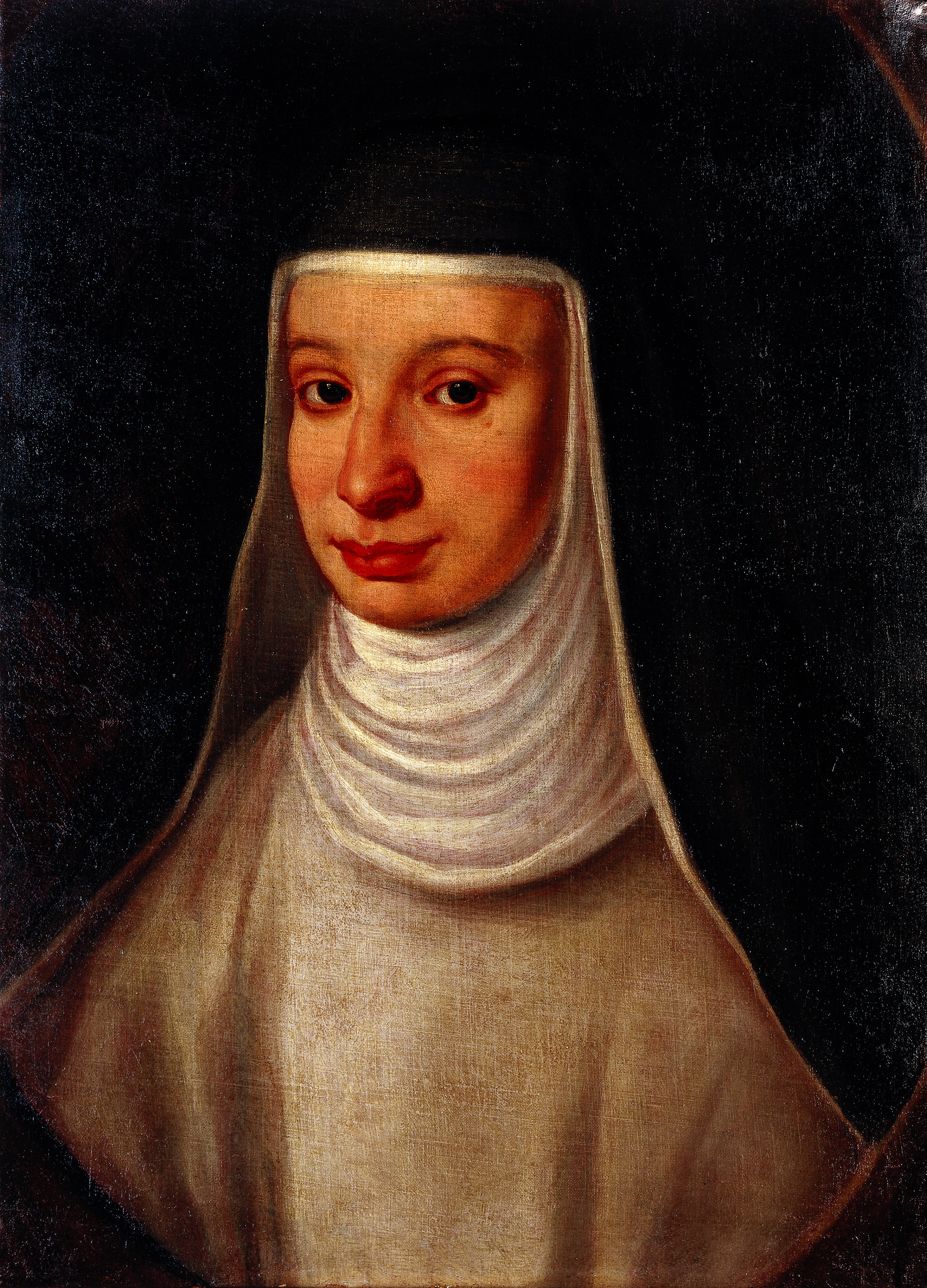
- Painting believed to be an image of Maria Celeste
- Born: Virginia Gamba; 16 August 1600; Padua, Republic of Venice
- Died: 2 April 1634 (aged 33); Florence, Grand Duchy of Tuscany
- Occupation: Roman Catholic Nun
- Relatives: Galileo Galilei (father); Marina Gamba (mother)

Sister Maria Celeste (born Virginia Gamba; 16 August 1600 – 2 April 1634) was an Italian nun. She was the illegitimate daughter of the scientist Galileo Galilei and Marina Gamba. After Galileo's death, 124 letters from Maria Celeste written between 1623 and 1633 were discovered among his papers. Galileo's responses to his daughter have been lost. Maria Celeste's letters have been published.

== Biography ==
Virginia was the eldest of three siblings, with a sister, Livia, and a brother, Vincenzio. All three were born out of wedlock, and the daughters were considered unworthy for marriage. Troubled by financial problems, Galileo placed them in the San Matteo convent shortly after Virginia's thirteenth birthday. When she took the veil on 4 October 1616, Virginia chose her religious name, Maria Celeste, in honour of the Virgin Mary and her father's love of astronomy.

From her cloister, Maria Celeste was a source of support not only for her Poor Clares sisters, but also for her father. Maria Celeste served as San Matteo's apothecary (herself being of frail health). She sent her father herbal treatments for his maladies while additionally managing the convent's finances and staging plays inside the convent. There is evidence she prepared the manuscripts for some of Galileo's books. Maria Celeste was also a mediator between her father and her brother.

Maria Celeste frequently asked her father for help for the convent, and kept it afloat through his influence. Galileo helped repair its windows and made sure its clock was in order.

In 1633, the Inquisition tried Galileo for heresy. He was forced to recant his views on heliocentrism, and was sentenced to house arrest for life. Shortly after Galileo returned to Arcetri in disgrace, Maria Celeste contracted dysentery and died on 2 April 1634, aged 33.

Galileo described Maria Celeste as "a woman of exquisite mind, singular goodness, and most tenderly attached to me".

== Work ==
After Galileo's death, 124 letters from Maria Celeste written between 1623 and 1633 were discovered among his papers. Galileo's responses have been lost. Maria Celeste's letters have been published:

- (in Italian) Virginia Galilei, Lettere al padre on Wikisource
- (in English) Galilei, Maria Celeste, and Sobel, Dava. Letters to Father: Suor Maria Celeste to Galileo, 1623–1633. New York: Walker & Co., 2001 Also online

== Legacy ==
- The International Astronomical Union (IAU) has named the impact crater Maria Celeste on the planet Venus after her.
- The European Space Agency (ESA) has named its low Earth orbit satellite constellation Celeste (LEO-PNT), complementing the Galileo satellite navigation system, after her in 2025.

== In fiction ==
- Maria Celeste is the subject, along with Galileo, of the book Galileo's Daughter: A Historical Memoir of Science, Faith, and Love by Dava Sobel published in 1999, based on the surviving letters of Suor Maria Celeste to Galileo
- Maria Celeste appears as a character in the play Life of Galileo, by Bertold Brecht and Margarete Steffin. The play does not give an accurate portrayal of her life as it depicts her becoming engaged, rather than as a nun.
- She appears as a character in the novel Galileo's Dream, by Kim Stanley Robinson.
- Maria Celeste is a character in the 2026 Broadway musical Galileo by Michael Weiner, Zoe Sarnak, and Danny Strong.
