= Dava Sobel =

American science writer

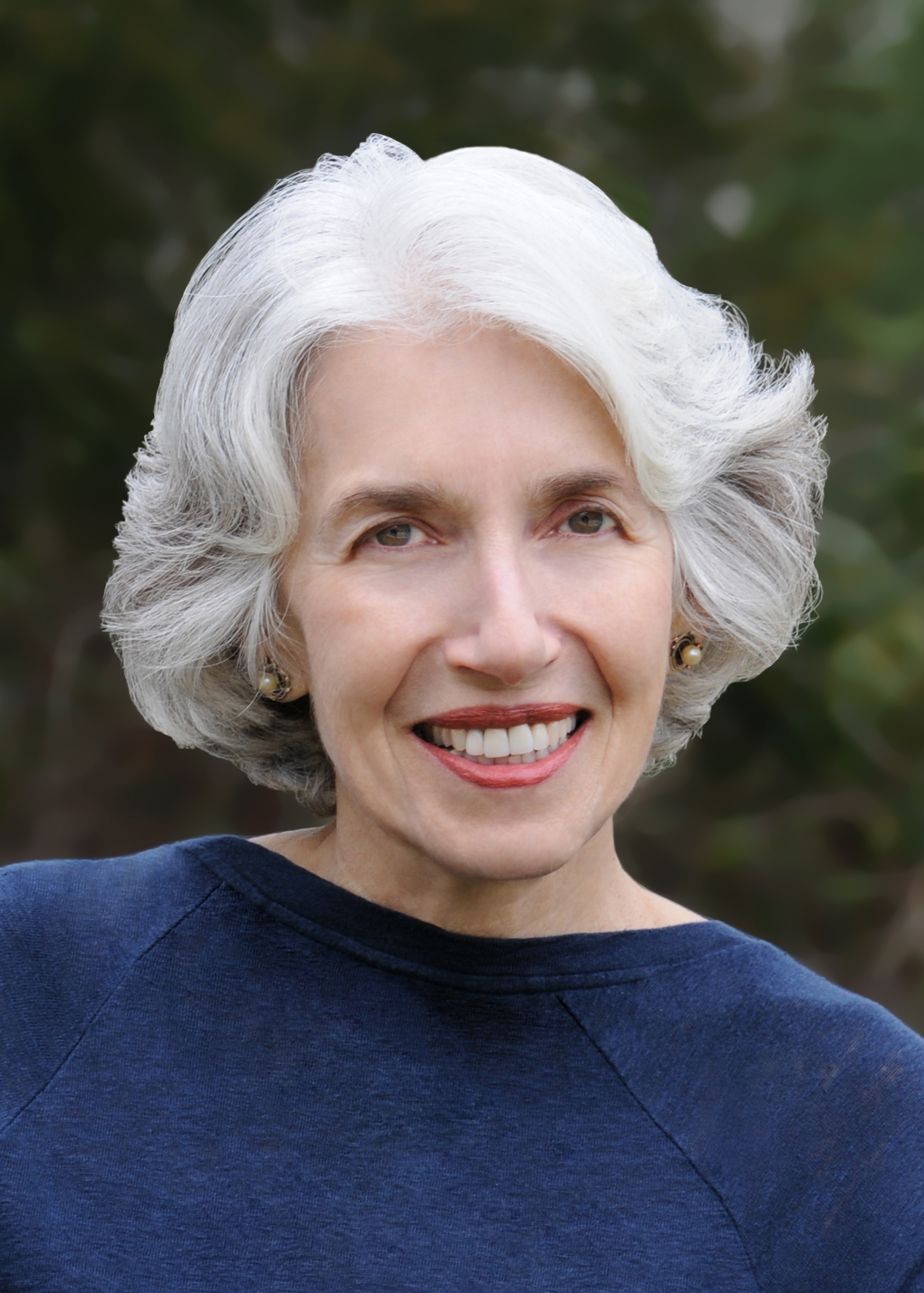
- Sobel in 2015
- Born: June 15, 1947 (age 79); The Bronx, New York City, U.S.
- Education: Bronx High School of Science
- Alma mater: Binghamton University
- Relatives: Ruth Gruber (aunt); David Michaels (cousin)
- Awards: Guggenheim Fellowship for Natural Sciences, US & Canada, Klumpke-Roberts Award
- Website: www.davasobel.com

Dava Sobel (born June 15, 1947) is an American writer of popular expositions of scientific topics. Her books include Longitude, about English clockmaker John Harrison; Galileo's Daughter, about Galileo's daughter Maria Celeste; and The Glass Universe: How the Ladies of the Harvard Observatory Took the Measure of the Stars about the Harvard Computers.

== Biography ==
Sobel was born in The Bronx, New York City. She graduated from the Bronx High School of Science and Binghamton University. She wrote Longitude: The True Story of a Lone Genius Who Solved the Greatest Scientific Problem of His Time in 1995. The story was made into a television movie of the same name by Charles Sturridge and Granada Film in 1999, and was shown in the United States by A&E.

Her book Galileo's Daughter: A Historical Memoir of Science, Faith, and Love was a finalist for the 2000 Pulitzer Prize for Biography or Autobiography. In 2005, Sobel published The Planets, her most ambitious topic to date. In this New York Times extended best seller, Sobel explores the origins and oddities of the planets through the lenses of both science and popular culture, from astrology, mythology, and science fiction to art, music, poetry, biography, and history.

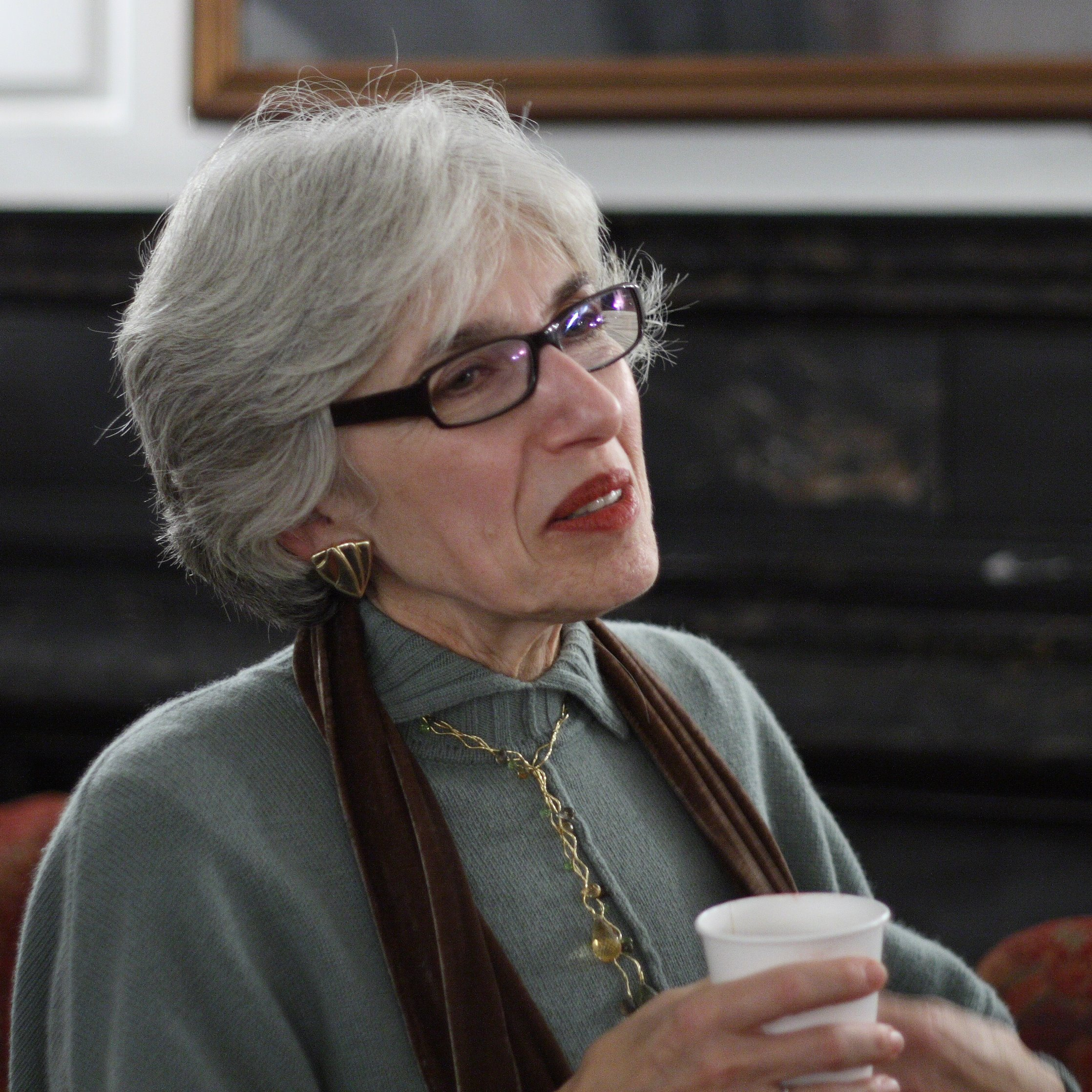
Dava Sobel in November 2007

She holds honorary doctor of letters degrees from the University of Bath and Middlebury College, Vermont, both awarded in 2002.

Sobel made her first foray into teaching at the University of Chicago as the Vare Writer-in-Residence in the winter of 2006. She taught a one-quarter seminar on science writing.

She served as a judge for the PEN/E. O. Wilson Literary Science Writing Award in 2012.

Sobel is the niece of journalist Ruth Gruber and the cousin of epidemiologist David Michaels.

== Legacy ==
Asteroid 30935 Davasobel, discovered by Carolyn S. Shoemaker and David H. Levy, was named after her for her literary work in physics.

Sobel states that she is a chaser of solar eclipses and that "it's the closest thing to witnessing a miracle". As of August 2012 she had seen eight, and planned to see the November 2012 total solar eclipse in Australia.

== Publications ==
External videos
- Presentation by Sobel on Longitude, June 17, 1997, C-SPAN
- Booknotes interview with Sobel on Longitude, January 17, 1999, C-SPAN
- Presentation by Sobel on Galileo's Daughter, December 14, 1999, C-SPAN
- Presentation by Sobel on Galileo's Daughter, November 19, 2000, C-SPAN
- Presentation by Sobel on Letters to Father, December 7, 2001, C-SPAN
- Presentation by Sobel on The Planets, November 15, 2005, C-SPAN
- Presentation by Sobel on The Glass Universe, January 19, 2017, C-SPAN

- Arthritis: What Works; Revolutionary Healing Approaches From An Unprecedented Nationwide Survey Of People With Arthritis. St. Martin's Press. 1992. ISBN 978-0-312-92719-6.
- Arthritis: What Exercises Work: Breakthrough Relief for the Rest of Your Life, Even After Drugs and Surgery Have Failed. St. Martin's Press. 2015. ISBN 978-1250068682.
- Backache: What Exercises Work. St. Martin's Press. 1996.
- Longitude: The True Story of a Lone Genius Who Solved the Greatest Scientific Problem of His Time (1995) ISBN 1-85702-571-7. OCLC 909490210 – the genius in question was John Harrison, who spent decades trying to convince the British Admiralty of the accuracy of his naval timepieces and their use in determining longitude when at sea in order to win the longitude prize. The book itself won the 1997 British Book of the Year award.
- Galileo's Daughter: A Historical Memoir of Science, Faith, and Love (2000) ISBN 0-14-028055-3
- The Best American Science Writing 2004 (editor) ISBN 9780060726409, OCLC 916515131
- The Planets: A discourse on the discovery, science, history and mythology, of the planets in our solar system, with one chapter devoted to each of the celestial spheres. (2005) ISBN 1-85702-850-3, OCLC 77646686
- A More Perfect Heaven: How Copernicus Revolutionized the Cosmos. Bloomsbury Publishing. October 4, 2011. ISBN 978-0-8027-7893-2. OCLC 819387028
- The Glass Universe: How the Ladies of the Harvard Observatory Took the Measure of the Stars (2016) ISBN 9780143111344, OCLC 972263666
- The Elements of Marie Curie: How the Glow of Radium Lit a Path for Women in Science (2024) ISBN 978-0802163820, OCLC 1437997660

== Recognition ==
In 2008, Sobel was awarded the Klumpke-Roberts Award by the Astronomical Society of the Pacific.

She was named a Fellow of the American Physical Society in 2022 "for outstanding writings covering many centuries of key developments in physics and astronomy and the people central to those developments".
