= For Inspiration and Recognition of Science and Technology =

International youth robotics program based in the United States

- Founded: 1989
- Founder: Dean Kamen, Woodie Flowers
- Type: 501(c)(3) not-for-profit public charity
- Tax ID no.: 22-2990908
- Headquarters: Manchester, New Hampshire, U.S.
- Members: 660,000+ students; 51,000+ robots; 300,000+ mentors/volunteers; 79,000+ teams
- Key people: Dean Kamen, founder; Laurie Leshin, chairman of the board; Christopher Moore, CEO
- Revenue: $86,489,037 (2024)
- Employees: 210 (2022)
- Website: www.firstinspires.org

For Inspiration and Recognition of Science and Technology (FIRST) is an international youth organization that operates the FIRST Robotics Competition, FIRST Tech Challenge, FIRST Lego League Challenge, FIRST Lego League Explore, and FIRST Lego League Discover competitions. Founded by Dean Kamen and Woodie Flowers in 1989, its expressed goal is to develop ways to inspire students in engineering and technology fields. Its philosophy is expressed by the organization as Coopertition and Gracious Professionalism. FIRST also operates FIRST Place, a research facility at FIRST headquarters in Manchester, New Hampshire, where it holds educational programs and day camps for students and teachers.

== Structure ==
FIRST operates as a non-profit public charity corporation. It licenses qualified teams, usually affiliated with schools or other youth organizations, to participate in its competitions. The teams in turn pay a fee to FIRST; these fees, the majority of which are redistributed to pay for teams' kit of parts and other services, comprise the majority of revenue of FIRST. The supreme body of FIRST is its board of directors, which includes corporate executives and former government officials. FIRST also has an executive advisory board and several senior advisors; these advisors include engineers, involved volunteers, and other senior organizers. Day-to-day operations are run by a senior management team, consisting of a CEO and a variety of vice presidents and additional officers for a total of 10 individuals.

== Activities ==
=== FIRST Robotics Competition ===
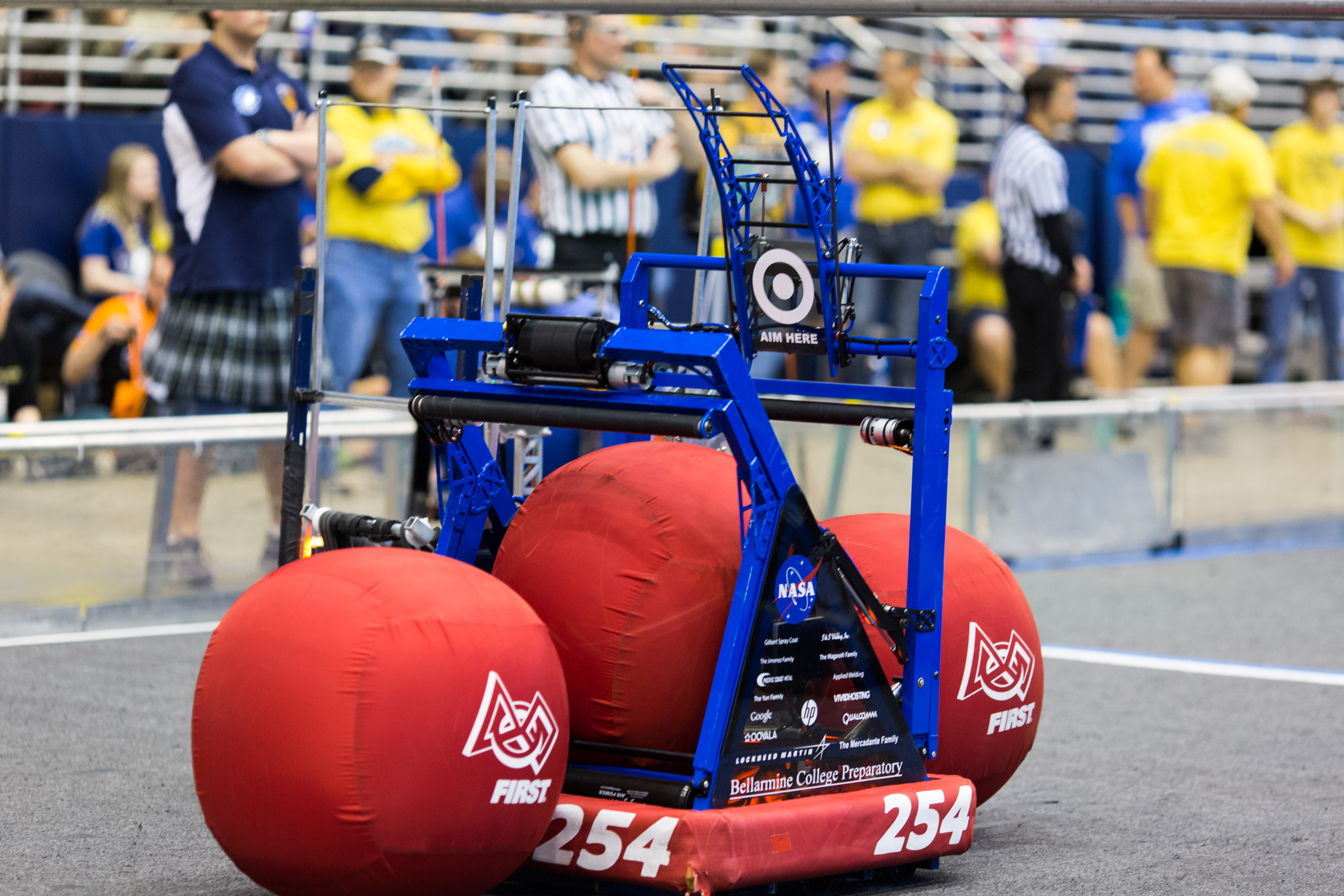
"Barrage", Team 254's 2014 World Champion FIRST Robotics Competition robot

The first and highest-scale program developed through FIRST is the FIRST Robotics Competition, which is designed to inspire high school students to become engineers by giving them real world experience working with engineers to develop a robot. The inaugural FIRST Robotics Competition was held in 1992 in the Manchester Memorial High School gymnasium. As of 2019, over 3,700 high school teams totaling over 46,000 students from Australia, Brazil, Canada, France, Turkey, Israel, Mexico, the Netherlands, the United States, the United Kingdom, and more compete in the annual competition, with more than 9000 teams (active and inactive) in existence.

The competition challenge changes each year, and the teams can reuse only certain components from previous years. The robots have maximum weight and size, usually around 125 pounds (57 kg) and 25 by 25 inches. The kit issued to each team contains a base set of parts. Registration and the kit of parts together cost about US$6,500. Details of the game have been released on the first Saturday in January (except when that Saturday falls on January 1 or 2), and the teams have been given about six weeks to construct a robot that can accomplish the game's tasks.

In 2011, teams participated in 48 regional and district competitions throughout March in an effort to qualify for the FIRST Championship in St. Louis in April. Previous years' Championships have been held in Atlanta, Georgia, Houston, Texas and at Walt Disney World's Epcot. On October 7, 2009, FIRST announced that the Championship Event will be held in St. Louis, Missouri for 2011 through 2013. Each year the FIRST Robotics Competition has scholarships for the participants in the program. In 2011, there were over $14 million worth of scholarships from more than 128 colleges and universities, associations, and corporations.

The district competition system was introduced in Michigan and as of 2017 has expanded to include districts in the Pacific Northwest, the Mid-Atlantic, the Washington DC area, New England, Georgia, North Carolina, Ontario, and Israel. When they were created in 2017, the Ontario and Israel districts became the first districts outside of the United States. The district competition system changed the traditional "regional" events by allowing teams to compete in multiple smaller events and using an associated ranking algorithm to determine which teams would advance to the next level of the competition.

=== FIRST Tech Challenge ===
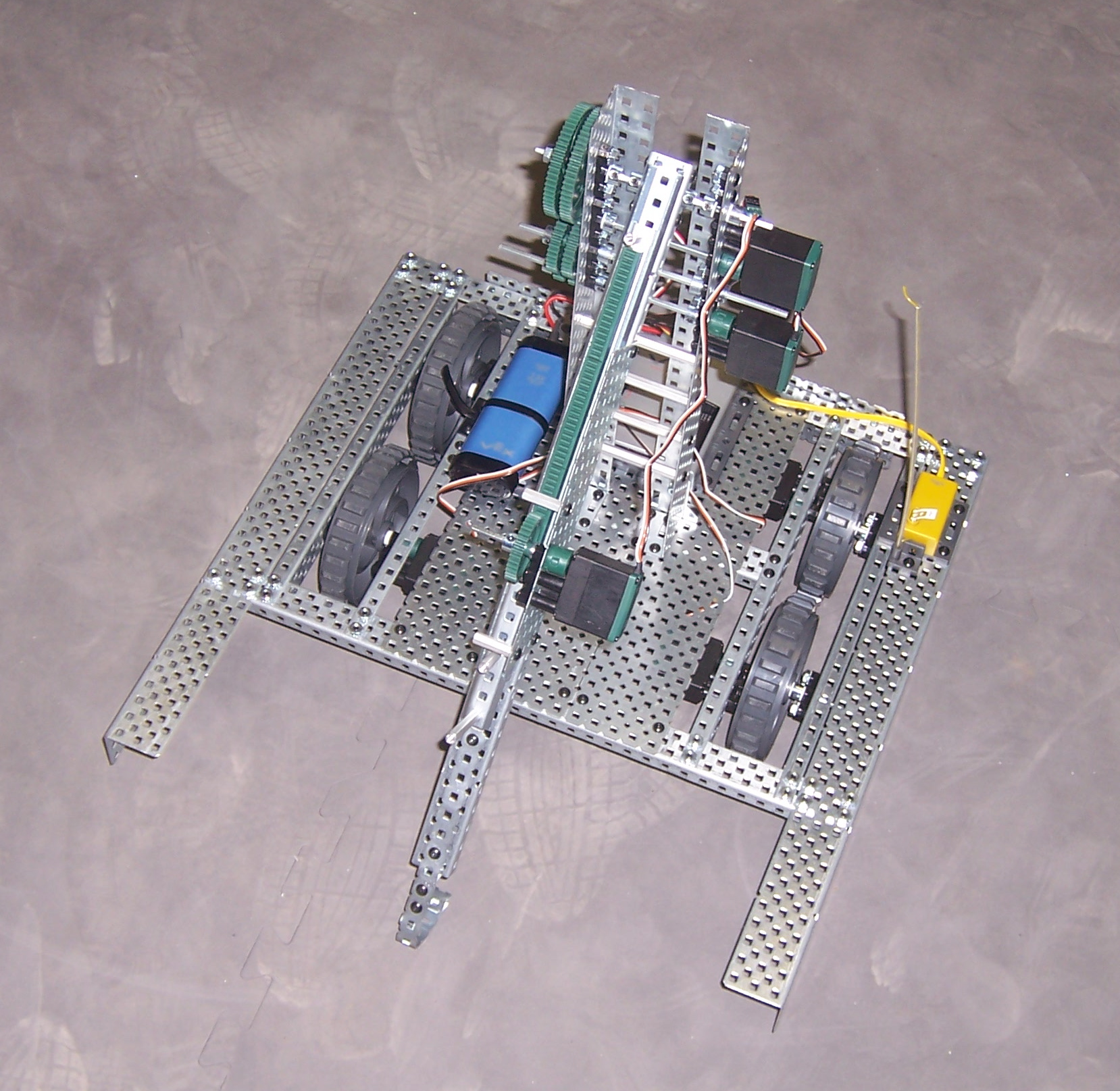
A 2007 FIRST Tech Challenge robot

The FIRST Tech Challenge, originally FIRST Vex Challenge, is a mid-level robotics competition announced by FIRST on March 22, 2005. According to FIRST, this competition was designed to be a more accessible and affordable option for schools. FIRST has also said that the FIRST Tech Challenge program was created for those of an intermediate skill level. FIRST Tech Challenge robots are approximately one-third the scale of their FIRST Robotics Competition counterparts. The FIRST Tech Challenge is meant to provide a transition for students from the FIRST LEGO League Challenge competition to the FIRST Robotics Competition. FIRST Tech Challenge was developed for the Vex Robotics Design System, which is available commercially.

The 2005 FVC pilot season featured a demonstration of the FIRST Vex Challenge using a 1/3 linear scale mock-up of the 2004 FIRST Robotics Competition, FIRST Frenzy: Raising the Bar. For their 2005–2006 Pilot Season, FVC teams played the Half-Pipe Hustle game using racquet balls and ramps. For the 2006–2007 FIRST Tech Challenge season, the teams competed in the Hangin'-A-Round challenge using softballs, rotating platforms, a hanging bar, and a larger 'Atlas' ball which is significantly larger than most Vex robots and harder to manipulate. Competitions were held around the United States, Canada, and Mexico.

For the 2008–2009 FIRST Tech Challenge season, a new kit was introduced, as FIRST moved away from the VEX platform and worked with several different vendors to create a custom kit and control system for FIRST Tech Challenge known as TETRIX. Based around the LEGO Mindstorms NXT "brain" and including secondary specialized controllers to overcome the limitations of the NXT, teams use a Bluetooth link between the NXT and a laptop running FIRST Tech Challenge driver station software. A team's drivers then use either one or two USB gamepads to control their robots. For the 2015–2016 FIRST Tech Challenge season, in a partnership with Qualcomm, the LEGO Mindstorms NXT was replaced as the "brain" of the robot by an android device that communicates to a separate "driver station" android device via WiFi Direct. In addition, students were allowed to use either MIT App Inventor or Android Studio (Java language) to program their robots.

=== FIRST Global Challenge ===
The FIRST Global Challenge is an annual, Olympic Style robotics competition organized by the International FIRST Committee. Created by Dean Kamen in 2016 as an international expansion of the FIRST organization, the competition invites a single team from each country worldwide age from 14 to 18 to foster cross-cultural communication and cooperation. the FIRST Global Challenge aims to promote STEM education and inspire youth to solve some of the planet's most pressing engineering and environmental challenges.

Unlike regional FIRST programs, the FIRST Global Challenge changes its host country every year. Past events have been held in major cities across the globe, including Washington, D.C. (2017), Mexico City (2018), Dubai (2019), Geneva (2022), Singapore (2023), Athens (2024), Panama(2025), and Incheon (2026). Each annual competition centers around a specific theme addressing one of the Grand Challenges of Engineering, such as access to clean water, renewable energy, or ocean conservation. Teams compete in shifting alliances composed of multiple countries, highlighting the core philosophy of "Gracious Professionalism" and international cooperation through unique gameplay features like the "Coopertition" bonus.

=== FIRST LEGO League Challenge ===
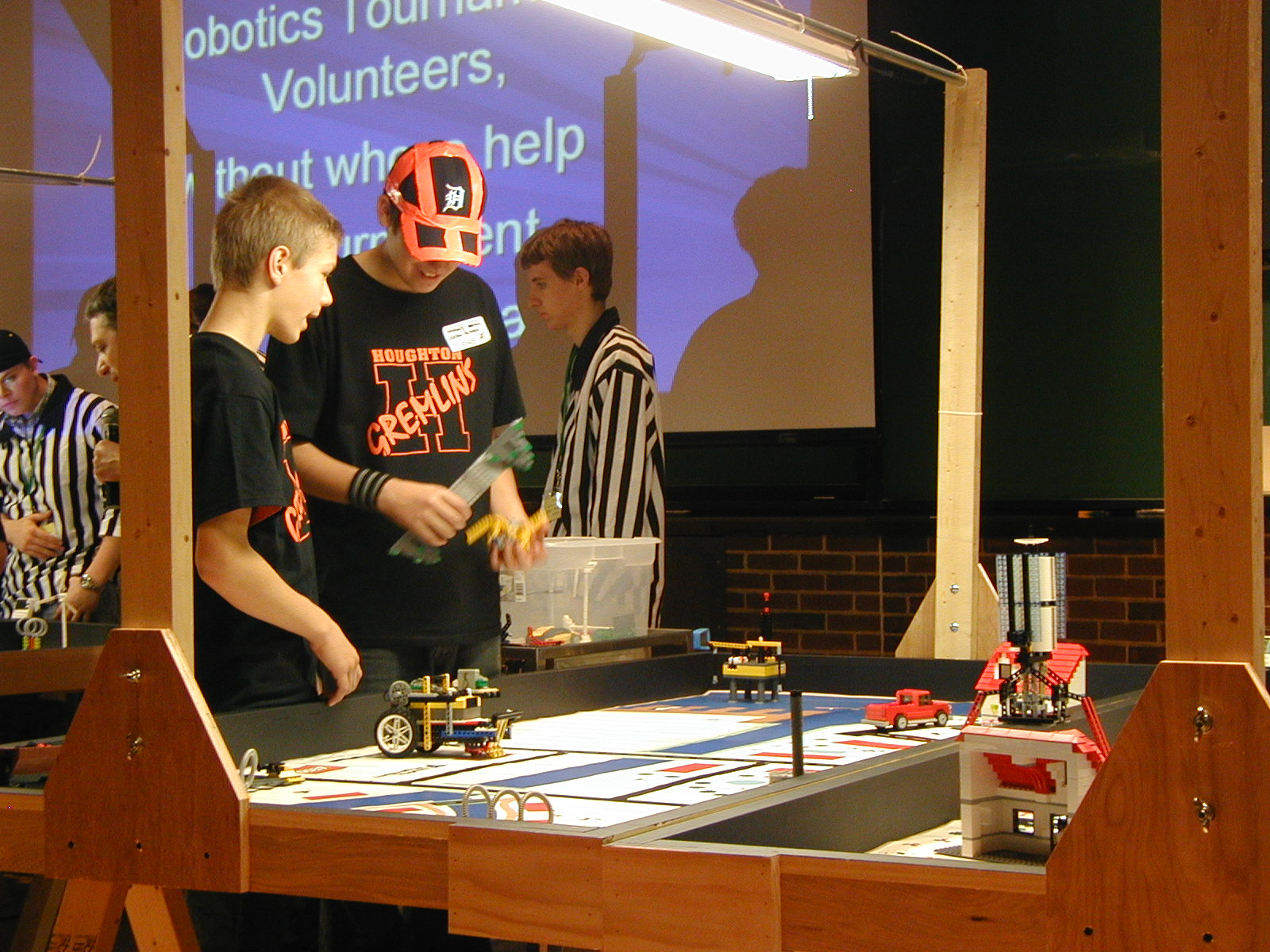
Power Puzzle (2007) robot playing field and robot

In 1998, the FIRST LEGO League Challenge (formerly known as FIRST LEGO League), a program similar to the FIRST Robotics Competition was formed. It is aimed at 9 to 14-year-old students and utilizes LEGO Mindstorms sets (EV3, NXT, RCX) to build palm-sized LEGO robots, which are then programmed using either the ROBOLAB software (RCX-based systems) or Mindstorms NXT or EV3 software (for NXT or EV3-based systems respectively) to autonomously compete against other teams. The ROBOLAB software is based on National Instruments' LabVIEW industrial control engineering software. The combination of interchangeable LEGO parts, computer 'bricks', sensors, and the aforementioned software, provide preteens and teenagers with the capability to build simple models of real-life robotic systems. This competition also utilizes a research element that is themed with each year's game, and deals with a real-world situation for students to learn about through the season. In 2020, the program was re-branded to FIRST LEGO League Challenge.

The simplistic nature of its games, its relatively low team startup costs, and its association with the LEGO Group mean that it is the most extensive of all FIRST competitions, despite a lower profile and fewer sponsors than FIRST Tech Challenge or FIRST Robotics Competition. In 2009, 14,725 teams from 56 countries participated in local, regional, national, and international competitions, compared with around 1,600 teams in roughly 10 countries for FIRST Robotics Competition.

On March 19, 2026, FIRST announced that LEGO decided not to renew their agreement with FIRST. The 2026-2027 season will be the last season of FIRST LEGO League.

=== FIRST LEGO League Explore ===
FIRST LEGO League Explore (formerly known as FIRST LEGO League Jr.) is a variation of the FIRST LEGO League Challenge, aimed towards elementary school children, in which kids ages 5 to 8 build LEGO models dealing with that year's challenge. At least one part of a model has a moving component. The teams participate in exhibitions around the country, where they demonstrate and explain their models and research for award opportunities.

=== FIRST LEGO League Discover ===
Unveiled in 2019, FIRST LEGO League Discover is designed for children ages 4 to 6 and centers on an introduction to STEM concepts and ideas for young children. Teams use LEGO Duplo kits to complete each year's challenge and present their models at exhibitions similar to those found in FIRST LEGO League Explore.

=== FIRST Championship ===
The FIRST Championship is an annual event where the top 600 FRC teams, 160 FTC teams, and 168 FLL teams from around the globe compete to form the 1st-place alliance for that year's challenge. In the past the FIRST Championship was held in St. Louis, Missouri; Detroit, Michigan; and Houston, Texas. From 2018 through 2020, the FIRST Championship was held in Detroit, Michigan, and Houston, Texas. At the 2014 Championship, FIRST announced changes to the 2015 structure that will bring a more "Olympic Village" feeling, and involves a rearrangement of the programs around the city.

== Support ==
FIRST itself is a self-supporting organization; however, individual teams rely on outside funding sources. It also takes significant outside funds to run regional events and the FIRST Championship. In 2010, FIRST was a recipient of a Google Project 10^100 grant.

=== Intra-team ===
Teams may request that team members, whether mentors or students, contribute to the costs of running a team. For example, members may pay a fee or donate tools and facilities.

=== Inter-team ===
Teams frequently give other teams support. This may mean providing funds, tools, facilities, or mentorship. Gracious professionalism and Coopertition are core tenets of the FIRST philosophy.

=== Community ===
The most common method of monetary and resource sponsorship teams comes through the community surrounding the team. Since the majority of teams are based around a school or a school district, schools often provide the infrastructure needed to run a team. Local governments and individual citizens may provide funds and other support to teams. Local universities and colleges often give significant funds to teams.

=== Corporate ===
Corporate donations and grants usually provide the majority of a mature team's funds. Major donors include BAE Systems, Google, Raytheon, Apple Inc., NASA and National Instruments.

=== Government ===
Each year during his speech at the kickoff event, founder Dean Kamen gives the student participants a homework assignment. It often involves spreading the word about FIRST in various ways, such as increasing attendance at regionals (2005), mentoring rookie teams, making sure that FIRST-specific scholarships are applied for (2004), and researching the capabilities of motors and disseminating that information to other teams (2006). In 2007, Dean's homework was for each team to contact their government officials (e.g. mayors, legislators, governors, federal officials) and invite them to a FIRST regional or the championship to expose them to the competition and increase the level of political awareness of FIRST. In 2008, it was to inform the media more about FIRST. In 2009, the homework was for each team to have all students, mentors, and other persons involved with their team (past or present) register with FIRST. One goal of this registration process was to provide FIRST with data to demonstrate that many people had benefited from their experiences in FIRST robotics and to encourage more funding of robotics-related events.

At the World Championship in Atlanta, speakers included former President of the United States George H. W. Bush in 2008 and United States Secretary of Education Arne Duncan in 2010. In 2010, former U.S. Undersecretary of Commerce and Director of the U.S. Patent and Trademark Office Jon Dudas was selected to be the President of FIRST. At the Championship in St. Louis, former President of the United States Barack Obama spoke via a pre-recorded message from 2011 to 2014. FIRST has received the attention of politicians in Canada as well. Ontario MPP Bob Delaney and Ontario MPP Vic Fedeli have made remarks in the Legislative Assembly of Ontario regarding their FIRST Robotics Competition experiences and showing their support. NASA, through its Robotics Alliance Project, is a major supporter of FIRST. In 2018, the first episode of season five of STEM in 30, the National Air and Space Museum's television show for middle school students, featured FIRST.

== Philosophy ==
FIRST seeks to promote a philosophy of teamwork and collaboration among engineers and encourages competing teams to remain friendly, helping each other out when necessary. Terms frequently applied to this ethos are Gracious Professionalism and Coopertition; terms coined by Woodie Flowers and Kamen that support respect towards one's competitors and integrity in one's actions. The concept of Gracious Professionalism grew from a robotics class that Flowers taught at Massachusetts Institute of Technology. Coopertition is patented under US Patent 7,507,169 by Dean Kamen.

== Timeline ==
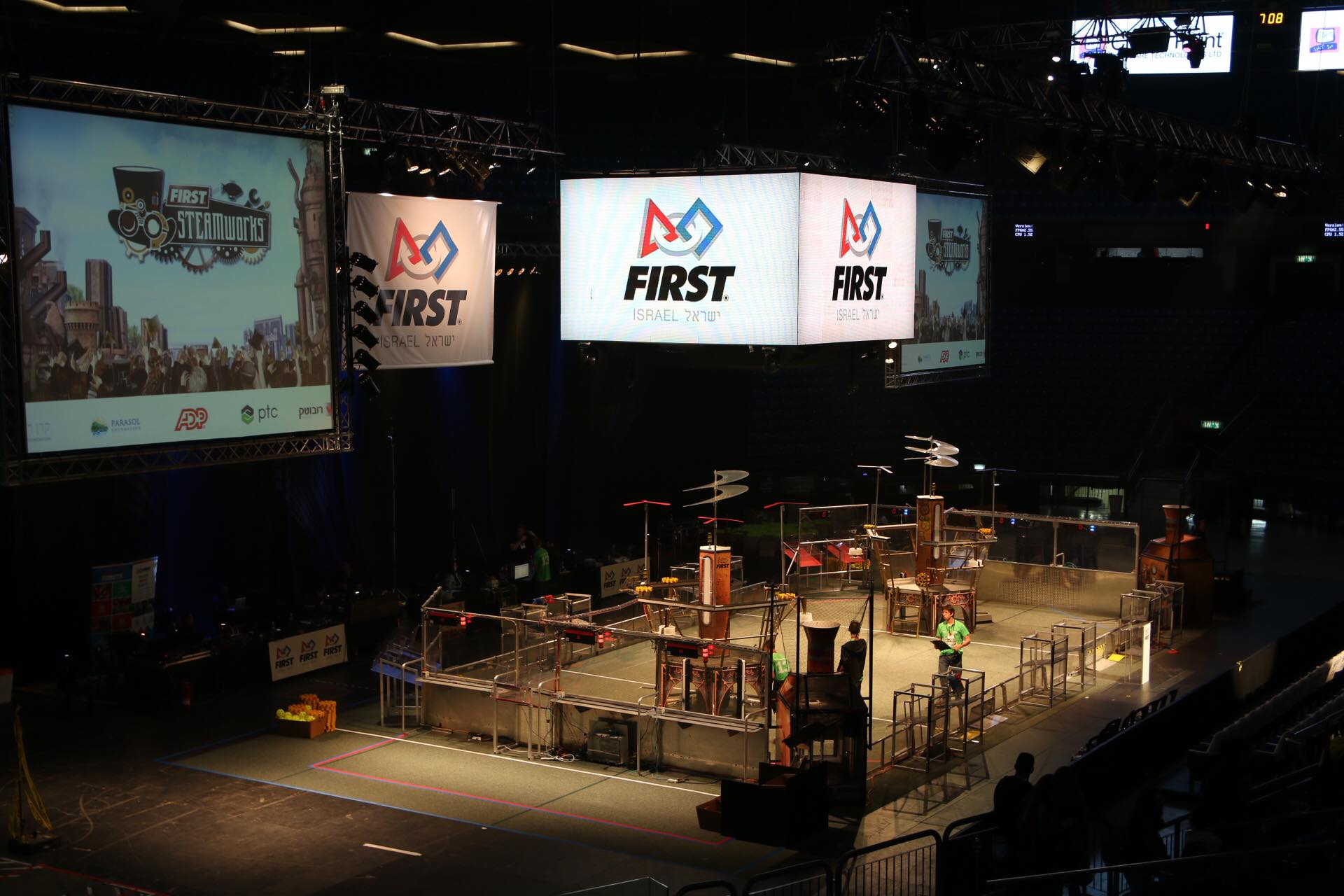
The FIRST STEAMWORKS Field at the Menora Mivtachim Arena, 2017 Israel District Championship

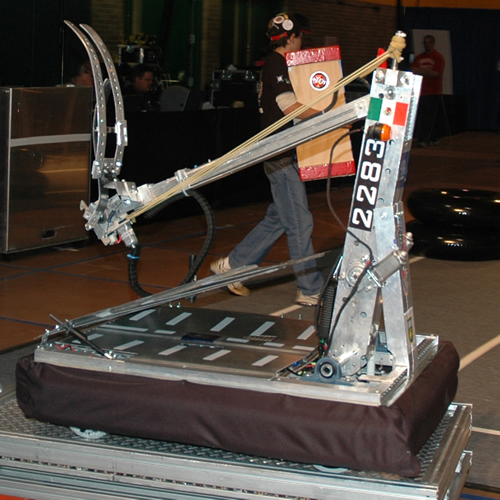
Team 2283's robot for Rack 'n Roll in 2007

Note: All years indicate the year that the championship for that game was held.

Year	Season	FIRST LEGO League Explore	FIRST LEGO League Challenge	FIRST Tech Challenge	FIRST Robotics Competition
1992	—N/a	—N/a	—N/a	—N/a	Maize Craze
1993	—N/a	—N/a	—N/a	—N/a	Rug Rage
1994	—N/a	—N/a	—N/a	—N/a	Tower Power
1995	—N/a	—N/a	—N/a	—N/a	Ramp 'n Roll
1996	—N/a	—N/a	—N/a	—N/a	Hexagon Havoc
1997	—N/a	—N/a	—N/a	—N/a	Toroid Terror
1998	—N/a	—N/a	—N/a	—N/a	Ladder Logic
1999	—N/a	—N/a	—N/a	—N/a	Double Trouble
2000	—N/a	—N/a	FIRST Contact	—N/a	Co-Opertition FIRST
2001	—N/a	—N/a	Volcanic Panic	—N/a	Diabolical Dynamics
2002	—N/a	—N/a	Arctic Impact	—N/a	Zone Zeal
2003	—N/a	—N/a	City Sights	—N/a	Stack Attack
2004	—N/a	—N/a	Mission Mars	—N/a	FIRST Frenzy: Raising the Bar
2005	—N/a	No Limits		—N/a	Triple Play
2006	—N/a	Ocean Odyssey		Half-Pipe Hustle	Aim High
2007	—N/a	Nano Quest		Hangin'-A-Round	Rack 'n Roll
2008	—N/a	Power Puzzle		Quad Quandary	FIRST Overdrive
2009	—N/a	Climate Connections		Face Off	Lunacy
2010	—N/a	Smart Move		Hot Shot!	Breakaway
2011	—N/a	Body Forward		Get Over It!	Logo Motion
2012	—N/a	Food Factor		Bowled Over!	Rebound Rumble
2013	—N/a	Super Seniors	Senior Solutions	Ring It Up!	Ultimate Ascent
2014	—N/a	Disaster Blaster	Nature's Fury!	Block Party!	Aerial Assist
2015	—N/a	Think Tank	World Class	Cascade Effect	Recycle Rush
2016	—N/a	Waste Wise	Trash Trek	RES-Q	FIRST Stronghold
2017	—N/a	Creature Craze	Animal Allies	Velocity Vortex	FIRST Steamworks
2018	—N/a	Aqua Adventure	Hydrodynamics	Relic Recovery	FIRST Power Up
2019	FIRST LAUNCH	Mission Moon	Into Orbit	Rover Ruckus	Destination: Deep Space
2020	FIRST RISE powered by Star Wars: Force for Change	Boomtown Build	City Shaper	Skystone	Infinite Recharge
2021	FIRST GAME CHANGERS powered by Star Wars: Force for Change	Playmakers	RePlay	Ultimate Goal	Infinite Recharge (2021)
2022	FIRST FORWARD presented by Qualcomm	Cargo Connect		Freight Frenzy	Rapid React
2023	FIRST ENERGIZE presented by Qualcomm	Superpowered		Powerplay	Charged Up
2024	FIRST IN SHOW presented by Qualcomm	Masterpiece		Centerstage	Crescendo
2025	FIRST DIVE presented by Qualcomm	Submerged		Into The Deep	Reefscape
2026	FIRST AGE presented by Qualcomm	Unearthed		Decode	Rebuilt
2027	FIRST CANOPY	Bioglow		Biobuzz	Biocore

== See also ==
- Engineering
