= FIRST Championship =

Annual student robotics championship

FIRST Championship Event
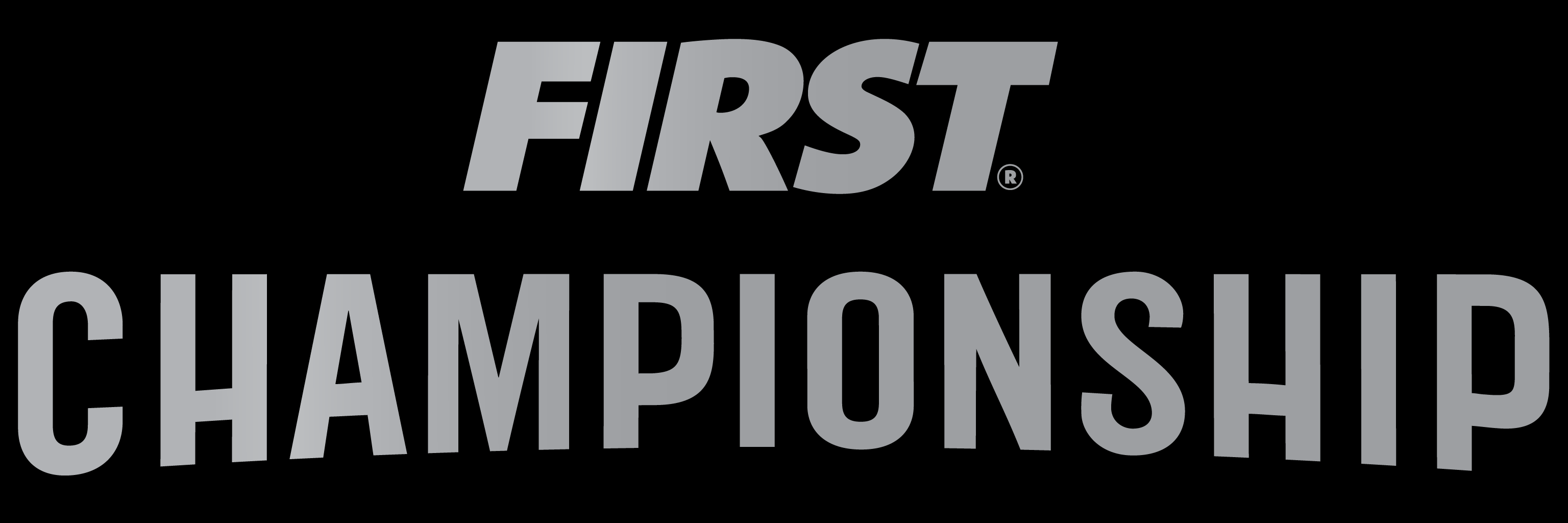
- Frequency: Annual
- Venue: George R. Brown Convention Center; Discovery Green
- Locations: Houston, Texas, United States
- Inaugurated: 1992
- Founder: Dean Kamen
- Participants: ~30 nations
- Organiser: FIRST
- Website: www.firstchampionship.org
- Both 2020 championships cancelled due to the COVID-19 pandemic. The FIRST LEGO League World Championship was held as a virtual competition on April 18 and 19, 2020 and hosted by FLL Share and Learn.

The FIRST Championship is a four-day robotics championship held annually in April at which FIRST student robotics teams compete. For several years, the event was held at the Georgia Dome in Atlanta, Georgia, but moved to the Edward Jones Dome in St. Louis, Missouri in 2011, where it remained through 2017. In 2017, the Championship was split into two events, being additionally held at the George R. Brown Convention Center and Minute Maid Park in Houston, Texas. In 2018 and 2019, the Championship was held in Houston and Detroit, Michigan at the TCF Center and Ford Field. The event comprises four competitions; the FIRST Robotics Competition Championship, the FIRST Tech Challenge World Championship, the FIRST Lego League Challenge World Festival, and the FIRST Lego League Explore World Expo.

The FIRST Robotics Competition is a ten-week program in which high-school students build 115-pound (52 kg) robots designed to compete in a game that changes each year. Students are given sets of parts to use, but they can also use off-the-shelf or custom-made parts. The FIRST Tech Challenge is a mid-level competition program for middle school and high school aged students with a more accessible and affordable robotics kit. FIRST LEGO League is a competition program for elementary and middle school students using LEGO Education Spike Prime robotics kits. Teams for each program compete in tournaments at a state and regional level. The winning teams from each of these tournaments join the global competition at the FIRST Championship.

The FIRST Championship was formally held in conjunction with the FIRST Robotics Conference, which covers a wide variety of topics in science, technology, engineering, and robotics fields.

The 2011 championship was also host to the Collegiate Aerial Robotics Demonstration, a pilot collegiate FIRST program.

In 2015, to expand, it was announced that the FIRST Championship would be divided into multiple venues. The new Innovation Faire featuring displays and demonstrations from FIRST Sponsors, Partners and Suppliers took place at the Renaissance St. Louis Grand Hotel, The FIRST Tech Challenge World Championship and the FIRST Lego League Explore World Festival took place at Union Station (St. Louis), and the FIRST LEGO League Challenge World Festival as well as the FIRST Robotics Competition Championship took place at the Edward Jones Dome and America's Center. The new arrangement was designed to give an "Olympic Village" feel and allow for more space to expand each individual program. In 2017, the Championship was split into 2 championships, one occurring in Houston and the other a week later in St. Louis. The second Championship was moved to Detroit for 2018 and 2019. In 2020, FIRST decided to move the closing ceremonies for all programs from Minute Maid Park and Ford Field to the convention centers in Houston and Detroit respectively.

The 2020 FIRST season was suspended on March 12, 2020, resulting in the cancellation of the Championship events in Houston and Detroit, due to the COVID-19 pandemic. The FIRST LEGO League World Championship was held as a virtual competition on April 18 and 19, 2020 and hosted by FLL Share and Learn.

The 2021 FIRST Championship in Houston and Detroit were cancelled due to the COVID-19 pandemic. The events were replaced by a virtual ceremony at the 2021 FIRST Global Innovation Awards on June 28–30, 2021.

Despite originally announcing dates for both Detroit and Houston for 2022, the 2022 FIRST Championship was later scheduled solely for Houston and was held from April 20 to April 23, 2022.

== Host cities ==
- 1992: Manchester, New Hampshire
- 1993–1994: Nashua, New Hampshire
- 1995–2002: Orlando, at Epcot Center, Walt Disney World
- 2003: Houston, at Reliant Park (now known as NRG Park)
- 2004–2010: Atlanta, at Georgia Dome
- 2011–2017: St. Louis, at Dome at America's Center, America's Center, Renaissance St. Louis Grand Hotel (2015–2017), Union Station (St. Louis) (2015–2017)
- 2017–2019: Houston, at George R. Brown Convention Center and Minute Maid Park
- 2018–2019: Detroit, at Cobo Center and Ford Field
- 2022–2034: Houston, at George R. Brown Convention Center

1992 was the first year of the FIRST Robotics Competition. Just over 20 teams competed at one event, which was held at Memorial High School in Manchester, New Hampshire. In 1993, the sole competition was held at Bishop Guertin High School in Nashua, New Hampshire. In 1994, the competition was held at Nashua High School. In 1995, FIRST had grown to the point to which they had outgrown the one competition, so they moved to a regional qualifier system, and thus the FIRST championship was born. From 1995 through 2002, the championship was held at Epcot Center in Orlando. Reliant Park in Houston was the venue for 2003. Atlanta served as host city from 2004 through 2010. In 2005, the contract with Atlanta was extended through 2007 with options for 2008 and 2009. In 2009, St. Louis was selected, from three finalists, to serve as host city for 2011 through 2013. In 2012, the tenure at St. Louis was extended until 2014. In 2013, the tenure in St. Louis was once again extended for three additional years through 2017.

The 2017 through 2019 championships consisted of two championship events, located in two different cities on back to back weekends. The 2017 championships was held in St. Louis, centered at the Edward Jones Dome, and in Houston, Texas, at the George R. Brown Convention Center, Toyota Center, and Minute Maid Park. 2017 marked St. Louis's final hosting of the event for the foreseeable future, ending its seven years hosting the event, as well as the FIRST Championship's return to Houston, following the 2003 Championships at NRG Park. In 2018 and 2019, Houston continued to host a championship, with Detroit, Michigan taking St. Louis's place. The Detroit championships took place at Cobo Center and Ford Field.

== FRC World Championship ==
The FIRST Robotics Competition Championship is the final and largest event of the season. The winners of each regional competition as well as the top teams from each district advance to the FIRST Championship. They are placed into one of the 8 divisions, named after influential individuals in STEM, to compete. The winning alliance from each division (a set of 4 teams) moves on to compete on the Einstein Field. The winning alliance on the Einstein Field is declared the FIRST Champion.

The FIRST Robotics Competition Championship was initially divided into 4 divisions:

- Newton
- Galileo
- Archimedes
- Curie

In 2015, the 4 divisions were further divided into 8 divisions (not including the final Einstein Field) and expanding naming to share more breadth in hero innovators:

- Newton
- Galileo
- Archimedes
- Curie
- Tesla
- Hopper
- Carver
- Carson

In 2017, the first year of the split championship, 4 more divisions were added bringing the total to 12 divisions (not including the final Einstein Field in each city), with six divisions in each city. The six division winning alliances played a round-robin tournament to determine their location's champion, who then played the other city's champion in July at the FIRST Festival of Champions in New Hampshire. On February 6, 2018, FIRST announced that the Festival of Champions would not happen from the 2018 season onward. Due to this, the winners of both championships would now be considered world champions. Houston:

- Carver
- Galileo
- Hopper
- Newton
- Roebling
- Turing

St. Louis/Detroit:

- Archimedes
- Carson
- Curie
- Daly
- Darwin
- Tesla

In 2022 with the return to a single championship event FRC teams were divided into the 6 Houston divisions seen through the 2019 championship. In 2023 2 additional divisions, Johnson and Milstein, were added to the 6 from 2022 bringing the total to 8 FRC divisions.

There are many awards that are presented to FRC teams at the Championship. These awards include the Engineering Inspiration Award, the Industrial Design Award, the Gracious Professionalism Award, the Entrepreneurship Award, the Industrial Safety Award, the Rookie All-Star Award, the Rookie Inspiration Award, the Woodie Flowers Award, and the Dean's List Award. The most prestigious award is the Impact Award (previously called the Chairman's Award), which recognizes the team that best represents a model for other teams to emulate both on and off the field.

=== 2012 Einstein Field Interference Incident ===
On the 2012 Einstein field, multiple robots lost wireless connection and communication, resulting in an inability to respond to commands. Given that 8 of the 12 teams in the finals were affected, FIRST launched an investigation into the root causes of the incident. Representatives from all 12 of the teams accepted an invitation to visit the FIRST headquarters for participation in further testing. According to the president of FIRST at the time, Jon Dudas, there was an intentional act of interference by an FRC team member who was not a part of the winning alliance. The report from FIRST indicated that there were multiple causes in addition to intentional interference that could have resulted in the incident, such as troubleshooting failures, radio power supply, sensors, wiring, and software malfunctions.

=== Recent winners ===
Year / Theme	Award name	Team name	Team number	Location
2026 / Rebuilt	Championship Winner #1	High Tide	4414	Ventura, California, USA
2026 / Rebuilt	Championship Winner #2	MadTown Robotics	1323	Madera, California, USA
2026 / Rebuilt	Championship Winner #3	Nerds of Prey	4065	Minneola, Florida, USA
2026 / Rebuilt	Championship Winner #4	The Holy Cows	1538	San Diego, California, USA
2026 / Rebuilt	Impact Award	LAUNCH TEAM	6352	Surprise, Arizona, USA
2025 / Reefscape	Championship Winner #1	MadTown Robotics	1323	Madera, California, USA
2025 / Reefscape	Championship Winner #2	Jack in the Bot	2910	Mill Creek, Washington, USA
2025 / Reefscape	Championship Winner #3	Maverick Robotics	4272	Lafayette, Indiana, USA
2025 / Reefscape	Championship Winner #4	Iron Panthers	5026	Burlingame, California, USA
2025 / Reefscape	Impact Award	Project Bucephalus	5985	Wollongong, New South Wales, Australia
2024 / Crescendo	Championship Winner #1	Orbit	1690	Binyamina, HaZafon, Israel
2024 / Crescendo	Championship Winner #2	Team SCREAM	4522	Sedalia, Missouri, USA
2024 / Crescendo	Championship Winner #3	Team 8-Bit	9432	Phoenix, Arizona, USA
2024 / Crescendo	Championship Winner #4	RoboLancers	321	Philadelphia, Pennsylvania, USA
2024 / Crescendo	Impact Award	CocoNuts	2486	Flagstaff, Arizona, USA
2023 / Charged Up	Championship Winner #1	MadTown Robotics	1323	Madera, California, USA
2023 / Charged Up	Championship Winner #2	HighTide	4414	Ventura, California, USA
2023 / Charged Up	Championship Winner #3	Ctrl-Z	4096	Champaign, Illinois, USA
2023 / Charged Up	Championship Winner #4	BeaverworX	2609	Guelph, Ontario, Canada
2023 / Charged Up	Impact Award	RoboLancers	321	Philadelphia, Pennsylvania, USA
2022 / Rapid React	Championship Winner #1	Up-A-Creek Robotics	1619	Longmont, Colorado, USA
2022 / Rapid React	Championship Winner #2	The Cheesy Poofs	254	San Jose, California, USA
2022 / Rapid React	Championship Winner #3	Knight Vision	3175	Grosse Pointe Woods, Michigan, USA
2022 / Rapid React	Championship Winner #4	Fusion Corps	6672	Irving, Texas, USA
2022 / Rapid React	Chairman's Award	Garrett Coalition	1629	Accident, Maryland, USA
2019 / Destination: Deep Space	Detroit / Detroit FIRST Championship Winner #1	Brighton TechnoDogs	3707	Brighton, Michigan, USA
2019 / Destination: Deep Space	Detroit / Detroit FIRST Championship Winner #2	ThunderChickens	217	Sterling Heights, Michigan, USA
2019 / Destination: Deep Space	Detroit / Detroit FIRST Championship Winner #3	Team Rembrandts	4481	Eindhoven, North Brabant, Netherlands
2019 / Destination: Deep Space	Detroit / Detroit FIRST Championship Winner #4	SCH Vulcan Robotics	1218	Philadelphia, Pennsylvania, USA
2019 / Destination: Deep Space	Detroit Chairman's	The Green Machine	1816	Edina, Minnesota, USA
2019 / Destination: Deep Space	Houston / Houston FIRST Championship Winner #1	Greybots	973	Atascadero, California, USA
2019 / Destination: Deep Space	Houston / Houston FIRST Championship Winner #2	MadTown Robotics	1323	Madera, California, USA
2019 / Destination: Deep Space	Houston / Houston FIRST Championship Winner #3	Iron Panthers	5026	Burlingame, California, USA
2019 / Destination: Deep Space	Houston / Houston FIRST Championship Winner #4	The Vitruvian Bots	4201	El Segundo, California, USA
2019 / Destination: Deep Space	Houston Chairman's	Exploding Bacon	1902	Orlando, Florida, USA
2018 / FIRST Power Up	Detroit FIRST Championship Winner #1	Stryke Force	2767	Kalamazoo, Michigan, USA
2018 / FIRST Power Up	Detroit FIRST Championship Winner #2	Team RUSH	27	Clarkston, Michigan, USA
2018 / FIRST Power Up	Detroit FIRST Championship Winner #3	Lake Effect Robotics	2708	Kingston, Ontario, Canada
2018 / FIRST Power Up	Detroit FIRST Championship Winner #4	Centre County 4-H Robotics	4027	State College, Pennsylvania, USA
2018 / FIRST Power Up	Detroit Chairman's	Bionic Black Hawks	2834	Bloomfield Hills, Michigan, USA
2018 / FIRST Power Up	Houston FIRST Championship Winner #1	The Cheesy Poofs	254	San Jose, California, USA
2018 / FIRST Power Up	Houston FIRST Championship Winner #2	The Robowranglers	148	Greenville, Texas, USA
2018 / FIRST Power Up	Houston FIRST Championship Winner #3	Spartabots	2976	Sammamish, Washington, USA
2018 / FIRST Power Up	Houston FIRST Championship Winner #4	Ha-Dream Team	3075	Hod-Ha'Sharon, HaMerkaz, Israel
2018 / FIRST Power Up	Houston Chairman's	Kell Robotics	1311	Kennesaw, Georgia, USA
2017 / FIRST Steamworks	St Louis / Festival of Champions Winner #1	Stryke Force	2767	Kalamazoo, Michigan, USA
2017 / FIRST Steamworks	St Louis / Festival of Champions Winner #2	The Cheesy Poofs	254	San Jose, California, USA
2017 / FIRST Steamworks	St Louis / Festival of Champions Winner #3	Lightning Robotics	862	Canton, Michigan, USA
2017 / FIRST Steamworks	St Louis / Festival of Champions Winner #4	The Pascack PI-oneers	1676	Montvale, New Jersey, USA
2017 / FIRST Steamworks	St Louis Chairman's	Mountaineer Area RoboticS (MARS)	2614	Morgantown, West Virginia, USA
2017 / FIRST Steamworks	Houston Festival of Champions Representative	Columbus Space Program	4188	Columbus, Georgia, USA
2017 / FIRST Steamworks	Houston Winner #1	Greybots	973	Atascadero, California, USA
2017 / FIRST Steamworks	Houston Winner #2	CRUSH	1011	Tucson, Arizona, USA
2017 / FIRST Steamworks	Houston Winner #3	Viking Robotics	2928	Seattle/Ballard, Washington, USA
2017 / FIRST Steamworks	Houston Winner #4	Bay Orangutans	5499	Berkeley, California, USA
2017 / FIRST Steamworks	Houston Chairman's	Thunder Down Under	3132	Sydney, Australia
2016 / FIRST Stronghold	Championship Winner #1	The Beach Bots	330	Hermosa Beach, California, USA
2016 / FIRST Stronghold	Championship Winner #2	Roboteers	2481	Tremont, Illinois, USA
2016 / FIRST Stronghold	Championship Winner #3	Cleveland's Team	120	Cleveland, Ohio, USA
2016 / FIRST Stronghold	Championship Winner #4	Blue Cheese	1086	Glen Allen, Virginia, USA
2016 / FIRST Stronghold	Chairman's Award	HIGHROLLERS	987	Las Vegas, Nevada, USA
2015 / Recycle Rush	Championship Winner #1	Robonauts	118	League City, Texas, USA
2015 / Recycle Rush	Championship Winner #2	Citrus Circuits	1678	Davis, California, USA
2015 / Recycle Rush	Championship Winner #3	Buchanan Bird Brains	1671	Clovis, California, USA
2015 / Recycle Rush	Championship Winner #4	Gryffingear	5012	Palmdale, California, USA
2015 / Recycle Rush	Chairman's Award	Wolverines	597	Los Angeles, USA
2014 / Aerial Assist	Championship Winner #1	The Cheesy Poofs	254	San Jose, California, USA
2014 / Aerial Assist	Championship Winner #2	Las Guerrillas	469	Bloomfield Hills, Michigan, USA
2014 / Aerial Assist	Championship Winner #3	The All Sparks	2848	Dallas, Texas, USA
2014 / Aerial Assist	Championship Winner #4	Team C.H.A.O.S	74	Holland, Michigan, USA
2014 / Aerial Assist	Chairman's Award	Team RUSH	27	Clarkston, Michigan, USA
2013 / Ultimate Ascent	Championship Winner #1	Theory6	1241	Mississauga, Ontario Canada
2013 / Ultimate Ascent	Championship Winner #2	Texas Torque	1477	The Woodlands, Texas, USA
2013 / Ultimate Ascent	Championship Winner #3	The Coyotes	610	Toronto, Ontario, Canada
2013 / Ultimate Ascent	Chairman's Award	The Holy Cows	1538	San Diego, California, USA
2012 / Rebound Rumble	Championship Winner #1	S.P.A.M.	180	Stuart, Florida, USA
2012 / Rebound Rumble	Championship Winner #2	Raider Robotix	25	North Brunswick, New Jersey, USA
2012 / Rebound Rumble	Championship Winner #3	Bomb Squad	16	Mountain Home, Arkansas, USA
2012 / Rebound Rumble	Chairman's Award	Simbotics	1114	St. Catharines, Ontario, Canada
2011 / Logomotion	Championship Winner #1	The Cheesy Poofs	254	San Jose, California, USA
2011 / Logomotion	Championship Winner #2	WildStang	111	Schaumburg, Illinois, USA
2011 / Logomotion	Championship Winner #3	Greybots	973	Atascadero, California, USA
2011 / Logomotion	Chairman's Award	The Hawaiian Kids	359	Waialua, Hawaii, USA
2010 / Breakaway	Championship Winner #1	Beach Cities Robotics	294	Redondo Beach, California, USA
2010 / Breakaway	Championship Winner #2	The HOT Team	67	Milford, Michigan, USA
2010 / Breakaway	Championship Winner #3	Bobcat Robotics	177	South Windsor, Connecticut, USA
2010 / Breakaway	Chairman's Award	Miss Daisy	341	Ambler, Pennsylvania, USA
2009 / Lunacy	Championship Winner #1	WildStang	111	Schaumburg, Illinois, USA
2009 / Lunacy	Championship Winner #2	The HOT Team)	67	Milford, Michigan, USA
2009 / Lunacy	Championship Winner #3	Spartan Robotics	971	Mountain View, California, USA
2009 / Lunacy	Chairman's Award	Techno Ticks	236	Old Lyme, Connecticut, USA

== FTC World Championship ==
Before 2014, after all FTC teams have competed in state / regional championship tournaments, the winning teams move on to the FTC World Championship. The Inspire Award-winning teams and the captain teams of the Winning Alliance in the regional tournaments are automatically eligible for the world championship. If there are still spots available, additional teams may be picked by a lottery system.

From 2014 and on, teams compete in Qualifying Tournaments in order to qualify for their state/regional Championship. At that Championship, teams compete for a spot at one of 4 Super-Regionals. Depending on the presence/number of teams in each state, determines the number of teams that move on to a Super-Regional. Teams then advance from their Super-Regional to the World Championship. In the 2018–2019 season, Super-Regionals were abolished and FTC teams advanced to the World Championship directly from their state/regional Championship.

At each championship, awards are presented to recognize teams for their performance in the competition, their robot's design, and their efforts to spread the message of FIRST. These awards include World Championship Finalist and Winner, the Design Award, the Connect Award, the Innovate Award, the Motivate Award, the Think Award and the Judges' Award. The most notable awards are the World Championship Inspire Award and the award given to the winning alliance.

The FTC World Championship was held in Houston and Detroit through the 2019 championship. The event is currently held in Houston.

FTC has four divisions that teams are randomly divided into.

- Franklin
- Jemison
- Edison
- Ochoa

Up until the end of the 2016 season, winning alliances from Franklin and Edison went on to compete in the finals on the DaVinci Field. In 2017, FTC teams joined FRC teams to play their finals matches on the Einstein Field.

On March 6, 2026, these six divisions replaced the original four to accommodate the 336 teams attending the World Championship. The winning alliances from each division go on to compete in the finals on the da Vinci Field.

- Edison
- Franklin
- Goodall
- Jackson
- Lovelace
- Ross

=== Recent winners ===
Year / Theme	Award name	Team name	Team number	Location
2026 / Decode	Inspire Award	Amigos Droids	17792	Belo Horizonte, Minas Gerais, Brazil
2026 / Decode	Winning Alliance Team	Exodus	30030	Austin, Texas, USA
2026 / Decode	Winning Alliance Team	Velocity	21087	Brǎila, Brǎila, Romania
2026 / Decode	Winning Alliance Team	OverClucked Bots	11228	Zeeland, MI, USA
2025 / Into The Deep	Inspire Award	Rebel Robotics	18139	Norfolk, Nebraska, USA
2025 / Into The Deep	Winning Alliance Team	Up-A-Creek Robotics	11260	Longmont, Colorado, USA
2025 / Into The Deep	Winning Alliance Team	Team Matrix	20870	Mumbai, India
2025 / Into The Deep	Winning Alliance Team	The Disruptingly Robocephalic BrainSTEM Robotics Team	19746	Austin, Texas, USA
2024 / Centerstage	Inspire Award	Iterative Intentions	12791	Flower Mound, Texas, USA
2024 / Centerstage	Winning Alliance Team	AiCitizens	19066	Focsani, Romania
2024 / Centerstage	Winning Alliance Team	The Clueless	11212	San Diego, California, USA
2024 / Centerstage	Winning Alliance Team	Texpand	18763	Cape Town, Western Cape, South Africa
2023 / Powerplay	Inspire Award	Wolfpack Machina	18438	Beverly, Massachusetts, USA
2023 / Powerplay	Winning Alliance Team	GatorBytes	18457	Newbury Park, California, USA
2023 / Powerplay	Winning Alliance Team	Quality Control	21229	Bellevue, Washington, USA
2023 / Powerplay	Winning Alliance Team	Don't Blink	14481	Plainsboro, New Jersey, USA
2022 / Freight Frenzy	Inspire Award	TechnicBots	8565	Plano, Texas, USA
2022 / Freight Frenzy	Winning Alliance Team	Delta Force	17713	Arad, Romania
2022 / Freight Frenzy	Winning Alliance Team	Up-A-Creek Robotics	11260	Longmont, Colorado, USA
2022 / Freight Frenzy	Winning Alliance Team	Java the Hutts	14725	Fort Myers, Florida, USA
2019 / Rover Ruckus	Detroit Winning Alliance Team	LANbros	9971	Vincentown, New Jersey, USA
2019 / Rover Ruckus	Detroit Winning Alliance Team	Gluten Free	11115	Hollis, New Hampshire, USA
2019 / Rover Ruckus	Detroit Winning Alliance Team	N.Y.A.N. Robotics - Not Your Average Nerds	10091	Mundelein, Illinois, USA
2019 / Rover Ruckus	Detroit Inspire Award	The Giant Diencephalic BrainSTEM Robotics Team	8393	Baden, Pennsylvania, USA
2019 / Rover Ruckus	Houston Winning Alliance Team	Boom Bots	3101	Palm Harbor, Florida, USA
2019 / Rover Ruckus	Houston Winning Alliance Team	Aperture Science	5064	Elon, North Carolina, USA
2019 / Rover Ruckus	Houston Winning Alliance Team	Cobalt Colts	6547	Overland Park, Kansas, USA
2019 / Rover Ruckus	Houston Inspire Award	Root Negative One	9879	Springdale, Arkansas, USA
2018 / Relic Recovery	Detroit Winning Alliance Team	The Brainstormers	8644	Lexington, Massachusetts, USA
2018 / Relic Recovery	Detroit Winning Alliance Team	The Giant Diencephalic BrainSTEM Robotics Team	8393	Baden, Pennsylvania, USA
2018 / Relic Recovery	Detroit Winning Alliance Team	2 Bits and a Byte	4029	Lexington, Massachusetts, USA
2018 / Relic Recovery	Detroit Inspire Award	Wizards.exe	9794	Rockville, Maryland, USA
2018 / Relic Recovery	Houston Winning Alliance Team	Mechanical Maniacs	7750	Sutherlin, Oregon, USA
2018 / Relic Recovery	Houston Winning Alliance Team	RedNek Robotics Wun	724	Sun River, Montana, USA
2018 / Relic Recovery	Houston Winning Alliance Team	TechNova	12611	Bellevue, Washington, USA
2018 / Relic Recovery	Houston Inspire Award	Super 7	7477	Oviedo, Florida, USA
2017 / Velocity Vortex	Houston Winning Alliance Team	RedNek Robotics Wun	724	Sun River, Montana, USA
2017 / Velocity Vortex	Houston Winning Alliance Team	Rise Of Hephaestus	4216	San Diego, California, USA
2017 / Velocity Vortex	Houston Winning Alliance Team	Wait For It...	8651	Pearl, Missouri, USA
2017 / Velocity Vortex	Houston Inspire Award	FIX IT	3491	Victoria, British Columbia, Canada
2017 / Velocity Vortex	St. Louis Winning Alliance Team	Height Differential	8686	Littleton, Colorado, USA
2017 / Velocity Vortex	St. Louis Winning Alliance Team	Data Force	6929	Rockville, Maryland, USA
2017 / Velocity Vortex	St. Louis Winning Alliance Team	BoBots	5916	Earleville, Maryland, USA
2017 / Velocity Vortex	St. Louis Inspire Award Winner	Combustible Lemons	5466	Davenport, Iowa, USA
2016 / Res-Q	Winning Alliance Team	BoBots	5916	Earleville, Maryland, USA
2016 / Res-Q	Winning Alliance Team	Cubix^3	8221	Hampstead, Maryland, USA
2016 / Res-Q	Winning Alliance Team	TBD-To Be Determined	6022	Aurora, Ohio, USA
2016 / Res-Q	FTC World Championship Inspire Award	Hot Wired Robotics	7013	Portland, Oregon, USA
2015 / Cascade Effect	Winning Alliance Team	Neutrinos	6433	Lakeland, Florida, USA
2015 / Cascade Effect	Winning Alliance Team	RedNek Robotics Wun	724	Sun River, Montana, USA
2015 / Cascade Effect	Winning Alliance Team	Valley X Robotics	2844	Chandler, Arizona, USA
2015 / Cascade Effect	FTC World Championship Inspire Award	Schrödinger's Hat	3595	Fairbanks, Alaska, USA
2014 / Block Party!	Winning Alliance Team	Hot Wired Robotics	7013	Portland, Oregon, USA
2014 / Block Party!	Winning Alliance Team	Eagles Robotics Xperience	5257	Delray Beach, Florida, USA
2014 / Block Party!	Winning Alliance Team	4-H Techno Clovers	4240	Accident, Maryland, USA
2014 / Block Party!	FTC World Championship Inspire Award	Bears	3141	Mexico City, Mexico
2013 / Ring It Up!	Winning Alliance Team	Cougar Robotics Team	4251	Columbus, Ohio, USA
2013 / Ring It Up!	Winning Alliance Team	Fish in the Boat	4140	Lakeville, Minnesota, USA
2013 / Ring It Up!	Winning Alliance Team	Monkey Madness	5096	Huntsville, Alabama, USA
2013 / Ring It Up!	FTC World Championship Inspire Award	Beta	3550	West Des Moines, Iowa, USA
2012 / Bowled Over!	Winning Alliance Team	Robocats	4444	Louisville, Kentucky, USA
2012 / Bowled Over!	Winning Alliance Team	Masquerade	4997	Tampa, Florida, USA
2012 / Bowled Over!	Winning Alliance Team	ILITE Robotics	354	Haymarket, Virginia, USA
2012 / Bowled Over!	FTC World Championship Inspire Award	Landroids	4220	Livingston, New Jersey, USA
2011 / Get Over It!	Winning Alliance Team	SD30 Robotics	178	Ronan, Montana, USA
2011 / Get Over It!	Winning Alliance Team	Wreckers	577	Westport, Connecticut, USA
2011 / Get Over It!	Winning Alliance Team	MITibot	2875	Lexington, Massachusetts, USA
2011 / Get Over It!	FTC World Championship Inspire Award	Robots and Brain Bots Inc.	4466	Waltham, Massachusetts, USA
2010 / Hot Shot!	Winning Alliance Team	Smoke and Mirrors	2868	Lakeland, Florida, USA
2010 / Hot Shot!	Winning Alliance Team	Under the Son	2843	Hollywood, Maryland, USA
2010 / Hot Shot!	Winning Alliance Team	Global-Force	3864	Aiken, South Carolina, USA
2010 / Hot Shot!	FTC World Championship Inspire Award	Rock 'n Roll Robots	25	Pasadena, California, USA
2009 / Face Off!	Winning Alliance Team	Jr. Bomb Squad	92	Mountain Home, Arkansas, USA
2009 / Face Off!	Winning Alliance Team	RoboRaiders	679	Sandy Springs, Georgia, USA
2009 / Face Off!	Winning Alliance Team	Alberta Longhorns	2820	Calgary, Alberta
2009 / Face Off!	FTC World Championship Inspire Award	Einstein's Daughters	32	San Diego, California, USA
2008 / Quad Quandary	Winning Alliance Team	Mr. T	30	Montville, New Jersey, USA
2008 / Quad Quandary	Winning Alliance Team	Team Overdrive	74	Bridgewater, New Jersey, USA
2008 / Quad Quandary	Winning Alliance Team	Beach Cities Robotics	23	Redondo Beach, California, USA
2008 / Quad Quandary	FTC World Championship Inspire Award	Panteras	801	Mexico City, Mexico

== FLL World Championship ==
The top competitions in FLL program are FLL Open Championships and FLL World Festival. The Open Championships are managed by FLL Partners with a goal to bring teams from different regions to complete and showcase their achievements. Currently, there are six Open International tournaments: Open European Championship (OEC), WPI Annual FLL Event (WAFFLE), Open Africa Championship (OAC), Western Edge Open, Florida Sunshine Invitational and Asia Pacific Open Championship (APOC). The former FLL Open Asian Championship was held in 2008 in Tokyo, Japan. However, it did not return in 2009.

FLL World Festival is hosted and managed by FIRST. The teams are often the Champion's Award team at the state or national level with some other criteria including special nomination from FLL Operational Partners globally. In 2009, there were 84 teams from 27 countries that joined the festival with the theme Climate Connections. The award categories include Innovative Design Award, Quality Design Award, Programming Award, Research Quality Award, Innovative Solution Award, Creative Presentation Award, Teamwork Award, Team Spirit Awards, Against All Odds Awards, Outstanding Volunteer Awards, Adult Coach/Mentor Awards, Young Adult Mentor Awards, and Judges' Awards. The most notable awards are Champion's Award and Robot Performance Award.

=== Recent winners ===
Year / Theme	Award name	Team name	Team number	Location
2026 / Unearthed	Houston Championship Champion's Award Winner	ROBOTECH		Mollerussa, Spain
2026 / Unearthed	Houston Championship Champion's Award Finalist	mindfactory		Aargau, Switzerland
2026 / Unearthed	Houston Championship Champion's Award Finalist	SCRAPS by FutureLab		Thessaloniki, Greece
2026 / Unearthed	Houston Championship Champion's Award Finalist	SESI SENAI SC - Pipeline Surfer's		Itajaí, Brazil
2026 / Unearthed	Houston Championship Champion's Award Finalist	Tolebi Daryn		Lenger, Kazakhstan
2026 / Unearthed	Houston Championship Champion's Award Finalist	Robot Rampage		Saint Paul, Minnesota
2025 / Submerged	Houston Championship Champions Award Winner	SESI HEROES	70325	Jundiaí, Brazil
2025 / Submerged	Houston Championship Champions Award Finalist	FSIngenium Team	70362	Sarriguren, Spain
2025 / Submerged	Houston Championship Champions Award Finalist	SKILLSET	70295	Astana, Kazakhstan
2025 / Submerged	Houston Championship Champions Award Finalist	BIOTECH	70326	Barra Bonita, Brazil
2025 / Submerged	Houston Championship Champions Award Finalist	RED	70259	Ansan-si, South Korea
2025 / Submerged	Houston Championship Champions Award Finalist	Intelligent Mavericks	46665	Richland, Washington
2024 / Masterpiece	Houston Championship Champions Award Winner	LOS ATÔMICOS	64790	Araras, Brazil
2024 / Masterpiece	Houston Championship Champions Award Finalist	Knots and Bots	17737	Chicago, IL
2024 / Masterpiece	Houston Championship Champions Award Finalist	Master Cubz	55589	Andover, MA
2024 / Masterpiece	Houston Championship Champions Award Finalist	Breaking Bot	64770	Ciudad del Este, Paraguay
2024 / Masterpiece	Houston Championship Champions Award Finalist	Invictus	64839	Valencia, Spain
2024 / Masterpiece	Houston Championship Champions Award Finalist	PARDOBOOTS	64839	Ourinhos, Brazil
2023 / Super Powered	Houston Championship Champions Award Winner	FSINGENIUM Team	60008	Sarriguren, Spain
2023 / Super Powered	Houston Championship Champions Award Finalist	LITBOT100	59975	Kaunas, Lithuania
2023 / Super Powered	Houston Championship Champions Award Finalist	Legotronic Beavers	60009	Torres de Elorz, Spain
2023 / Super Powered	Houston Championship Champions Award Finalist	RoboRazors	59969	Amman, Jordan
2022 / Cargo Connect	Houston Championship Champions Award Winner	Legotronic Beavers	55467	Torres de Elorz, Spain
2022 / Cargo Connect	Houston Championship Champions Award Finalist	FIRST FUJISAN	55442	Kofu, Japan
2022 / Cargo Connect	Houston Championship Champions Award Finalist	RoboTrix 1200	55445	Kfar Yona, Israel
2022 / Cargo Connect	Houston Championship Champions Award Finalist	Aldeatrón Robotix	55466	Santa Cruz de Tenerife, Spain
2021 / RePLAY	Virtual World Championship International Invitational Champions Award Winner	FIRST FUJISAN	N/A	Kofu, Japan
2020 / City Shaper	Virtual World Championship International Invitational Champions Award - 1st Place	Snow White and the Critter Crew	492	Mount Prospect, Illinois
2019 / Into Orbit	Detroit Championship Champions Award - 1st Place	PHOENIX	44314	Kaunas, Lithuania
2019 / Into Orbit	Detroit Championship Winner - Finalist	FSINGENIUMTeam	32	Pamplona, Spain
2019 / Into Orbit	Detroit Championship Winner - Finalist	TövisASAP	44350	Budapest, Hungary
2019 / Into Orbit	Houston Championship Champions Award - 1st Place	iDB Tech-No-Logic	44264	Verona, Italy
2019 / Into Orbit	Detroit Championship Teamwork Award - 2nd Place	Team Skyline	1610	Holon, Israel
2018 / Hydro Dynamics	Houston Championship Winner - 1st Place	SESI Red Rabbit	37402	Americana, Brazil
2018 / Hydro Dynamics	Houston Championship Winner - Finalist	Water Works	23359	La Jolla, California
2018 / Hydro Dynamics	Houston Championship Winner - Finalist	SESI Jedi's	37401	Jundiai, Brazil
2018 / Hydro Dynamics	Detroit Championship Winner - 1st Place	Not the Droids You Are Looking For	51	Pittsburgh, Pennsylvania
2018 / Hydro Dynamics	Detroit Championship Winner - Finalist	FIRST FUJISAN	37289	Kofu, Japan
2018 / Hydro Dynamics	Detroit Championship Winner - Finalist	the Hydro HAULks	3436	Oakville, Ontario Canada
2017 / Animal Allies	Houston Championship Winner - 1st Place	Robo Stars	30362	Irbid, Jordan
2017 / Animal Allies	Houston Championship Winner - Finalist	SESI THUNDERBÓTICOS	30352	Rio Claro, Brazil
2017 / Animal Allies	Houston Championship Winner - Finalist	High Voltage Couch Bananas	20687	Eagle, Idaho
2017 / Animal Allies	St. Louis Championship Winner - 1st Place	Ctrl-Z Bayview Glen	5831	Toronto, Canada
2017 / Animal Allies	St. Louis Championship Winner - Finalist	Flufflepuff	1920	Granger, Indiana
2017 / Animal Allies	St. Louis Championship Winner - Finalist	St Peters Brickbusters	8631	East Troy, Wisconsin
2016 / Trash Trek	Championship Winner - 1st Place	The Incredibots	00000	Ohio, USA
2016 / Trash Trek	Championship Winner - Finalist	Mechatronic Ants	00000	Pamplona, Spain
2016 / Trash Trek	Championship Winner - Finalist	Tic Tac Toe	00000	Beirut, Lebanon
2015 / World Class	Championship Winner - 1st Place	Fast and Curious	23850	Aley, Lebanon
2015 / World Class	Championship Winner - Finalist	Mechatronic Ants	23750	Pamplona, Spain
2015 / World Class	Championship Winner - Finalist	HIPPIES	2936	Peoria, Illinois, USA
2014 / Nature's Fury	Championship Winner - 1st Place	INVICTA	N/A	Canterbury, England
2014 / Nature's Fury	Championship Winner - 2nd Place	Fast and Curious	23850	Aley, Lebanon
2014 / Nature's Fury	Championship Winner - 3rd Place	Strategic Headquarters of Innovative Engineering & Limitless Design (S.H.I.E.L.D.)	737	New Berlin, WI
2013 / Senior Solutions	Championship Winner - 1st Place	Untitled 1	16100	Bath, England
2013 / Senior Solutions	Championship Winner - 2nd Place	SESI Robotics School	16850	Ourinhos, Brazil
2013 / Senior Solutions	Championship Winner - 3rd Place	Robo Raiders	742	Lebanon
2012 / Food Factor	Championship Winner - 1st Place	Falcons Japan	15650	Tokyo, Japan
2012 / Food Factor	Championship Winner - 2nd Place	Blue Gear Ticks	252	Lincoln, Massachusetts, USA
2012 / Food Factor	Championship Winner - 3rd Place	NXTremers	15200	Bengaluru, India
2011 / Body Forward	Championship Winner - 1st Place	The Sentinels	3663	Oakville, Ontario Canada
2011 / Body Forward	Championship Winner - 2nd Place	SAP g33k$	13300	Mpumalanga, South Africa
2011 / Body Forward	Championship Winner - 3rd Place	Hammerheads	4129	Umatilla, Florida, USA
2011 / Body Forward	Robot Performance Award	Hammerheads	4129	Umatilla, Florida, USA
2010 / Smart Move	Championship Winner - 3rd Place	Cougar Robotics Team	437	Columbus, Ohio, USA
2009 / Climate Connections	Championship Winner - 1st Place	Da Peeps	55	Swartz Creek, Michigan, USA
2009 / Climate Connections	Championship Winner - 2nd Place	STEELE	1232	Illinois, USA
2009 / Climate Connections	Championship Winner - 3rd Place	NXT Generation	9201	Nordborg, Denmark
2009 / Climate Connections	Robot Performance Award - 1st Place	Emerotecos	8004	Brazil
2009 / Climate Connections	Robot Performance Award - 2nd Place	Team Singapore	8254	Singapore
2009 / Climate Connections	Robot Performance Award - 3rd Place	Giant Panda	8060	China
2008 / Power Puzzle	Championship Winner - 1st Place	External Fusion	8095	Singapore
2008 / Power Puzzle	Championship Winner - 2nd Place	Pixelation	2560	North Branch, Minnesota, USA
2008 / Power Puzzle	Championship Winner - 3rd Place	Power Peeps	334	Swartz Creek, Michigan, USA
2008 / Power Puzzle	Robot Performance Award - 1st Place	BLACK OCEAN CURRENT	8110	Kaohsiung, Taiwan
2008 / Power Puzzle	Robot Performance Award - 1st Place	Green Man Group	1	Windham, New Hampshire, USA
2008 / Power Puzzle	Robot Performance Award - 3rd Place	Landroids	2254	Livingston, New Jersey, USA
