= FIRST Tech Challenge =

Robotics competition

- Current season, competition or edition: BIOBUZZ
- Formerly: FIRST Vex Challenge
- Sport: Robotics-related games
- Founded: 2004
- Founder: Dean Kamen; Woodie Flowers
- First season: 2005
- Director: Rachel Moore
- Country: International
- Venues: Houston, US (world level), numerous smaller locations (qualifier and regional levels)
- Most recent champions: Inspire Award Winner: (Brazil) 17792: Amigos Droids; Championship Winning Alliance: (United States) 30030: Exodus (Romania) 21087: Velocity (United States) 11228: OverClucked Bots
- Broadcasters: NASA TV, Twitch
- Related competitions: FIRST Robotics Competition; FIRST Lego League Challenge; FIRST Lego League Explore
- Website: FTC

FIRST Tech Challenge (FTC), formerly known as FIRST VEX Challenge, is a robotics competition for students in grades 7–12 to compete head to head, by designing, building, and programming a robot to compete in an alliance format against other teams. FIRST Tech Challenge is one of the 3 major robotics programs organized by FIRST, which its other 2 programs include the FIRST Lego League (which is split into Challenge and Explore), and the FIRST Robotics Competition.

The competition consists of local qualifiers, regional championships and the world championship, the FIRST Championship. Every season, a kickoff is held to showcase the season's theme and game. After kickoff, robots are designed, built, and programmed by teams, and teams are encouraged to conduct outreach with their communities. Local qualifiers are held for teams to compete and qualify for regional championships, and from that point, regional championships are held for teams to qualify for the world championship.

The robot kit is Android-based, and it is programmed using Java, Kotlin, the Blocks programming interface created with Blockly, or other Android programming systems. Teams, with the guidance of coaches, mentors and volunteers, are required to develop strategy and build robots based on innovative, sound engineering principles. Awards are given for robot performance as well as for community outreach, design, and other real-world accomplishments.

== History ==
The FIRST Tech Challenge grew out of the existing FIRST Robotics Competition and the IFI Robovation platform. FIRST, RadioShack, and Innovation First collaborated to develop an improved version of the IFI Robovation kit. The kit was significantly upgraded and called the VEX Robotics Design System.

In 2004–05, FIRST piloted the FIRST Vex Challenge as a potential program. The pilot season brought together 137 teams to compete in 6 regional tournaments in a 1/3 scale FIRST Frenzy: Raising the Bar. Fifty teams participated in the FVC tournament at the FIRST Championship in April, 2006. On April 29, 2006, the FIRST Board of Directors voted to extend FVC for the 2006–2007 season.

In Summer 2007, after two seasons as the FIRST Vex Challenge, FIRST announced that the program would be renamed to FIRST Tech Challenge.

For the 2008 season, Pitsco developed a platform that uses the NXT brick along with additional hardware and a new structural framework under the new name of TETRIX. Then, in the 2015-2016 FTC season, the NXT bricks that were used previously as the robot controller were replaced by Android phones running Android KitKat (4.4) using Qualcomm Snapdragon (410) chips.

In 2020, FTC replaced the Android phones with a Rev Robotics Control Hub and kept one of the phones to use for a wireless connection between one or two Logitech or Xbox (Windows compatible) controllers and the control hub. The FTC championship was cancelled that year due to the COVID-19 pandemic.

In 2021, the second Android phone was replaced with the REV Robotics Driver Hub, allowing teams to directly connect their gamepads without the need for any adaptors. Motorola phones running the Android operating system are still competition legal to use as a robot controller or driver station, but it is not recommended.

== Competition ==
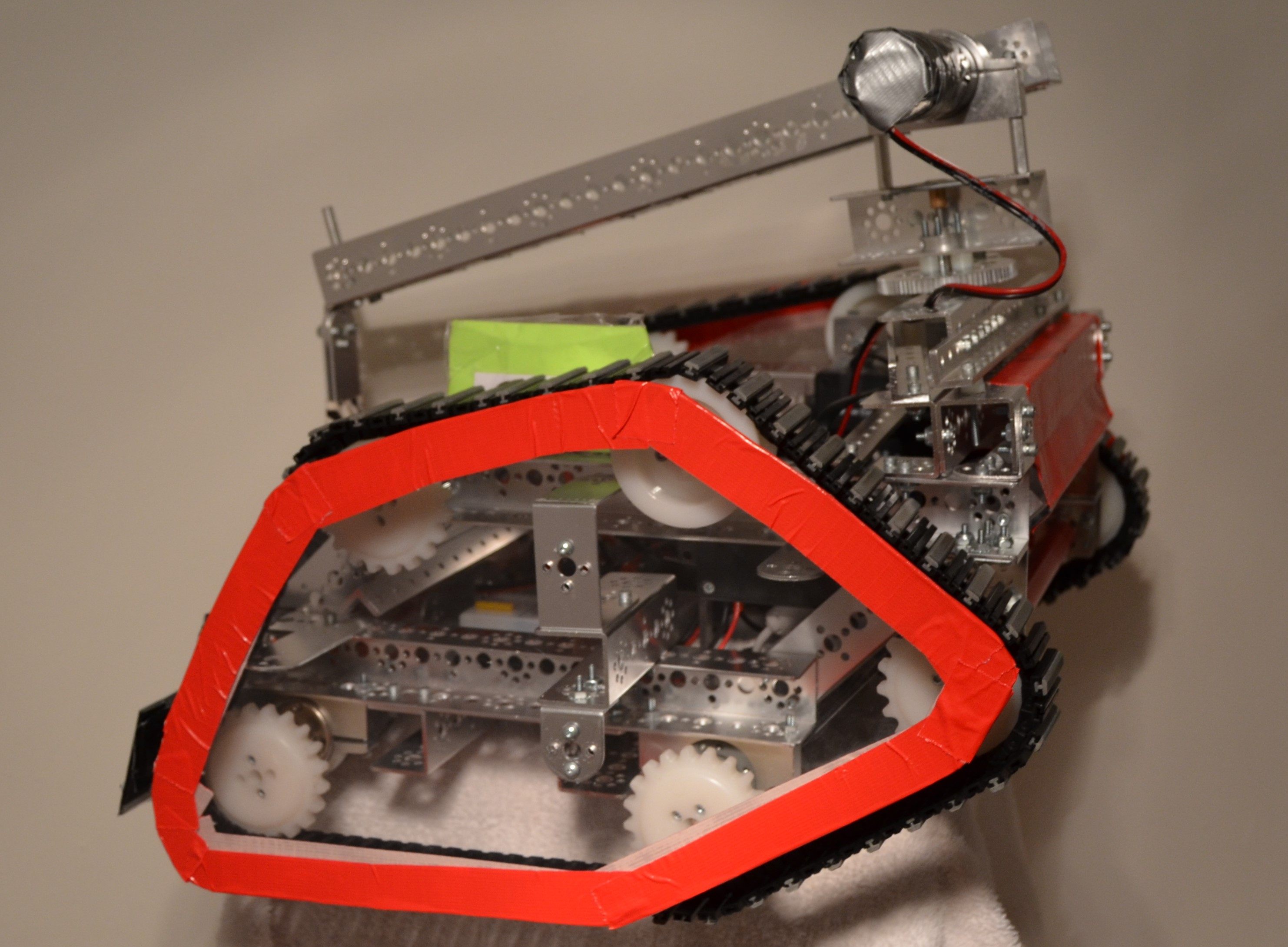
Robot of team 8275, the Tech Busters, for the 2015-2016 FIRST Res-Q challenge

Advancement from one level of competition to another in FIRST Tech Challenge can be achieved by either winning on the field (50%) or by winning the awards listed below during judging (50%). Judging at competitions is done through a multitude of ways such as team presentations, pit interviews, judges reading teams' portfolios, etc. Starting in 2025, teams advance based on a point system that combines robot performance on the field with judge awards.

=== Schedule ===
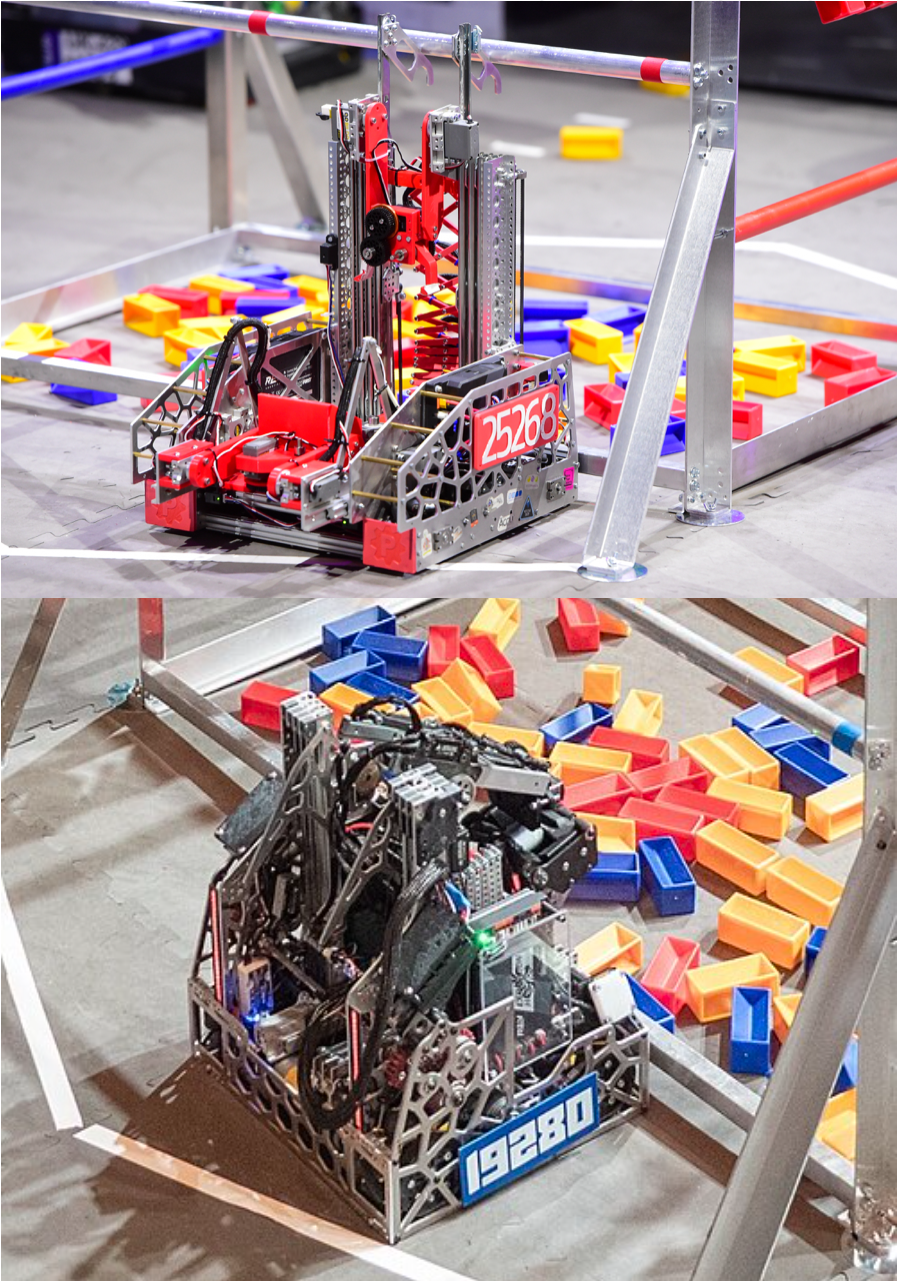
Robot of teams 19280, Phoenix, and 25268, Powercut Robotics, for the 2024-2025 INTO THE DEEP season.

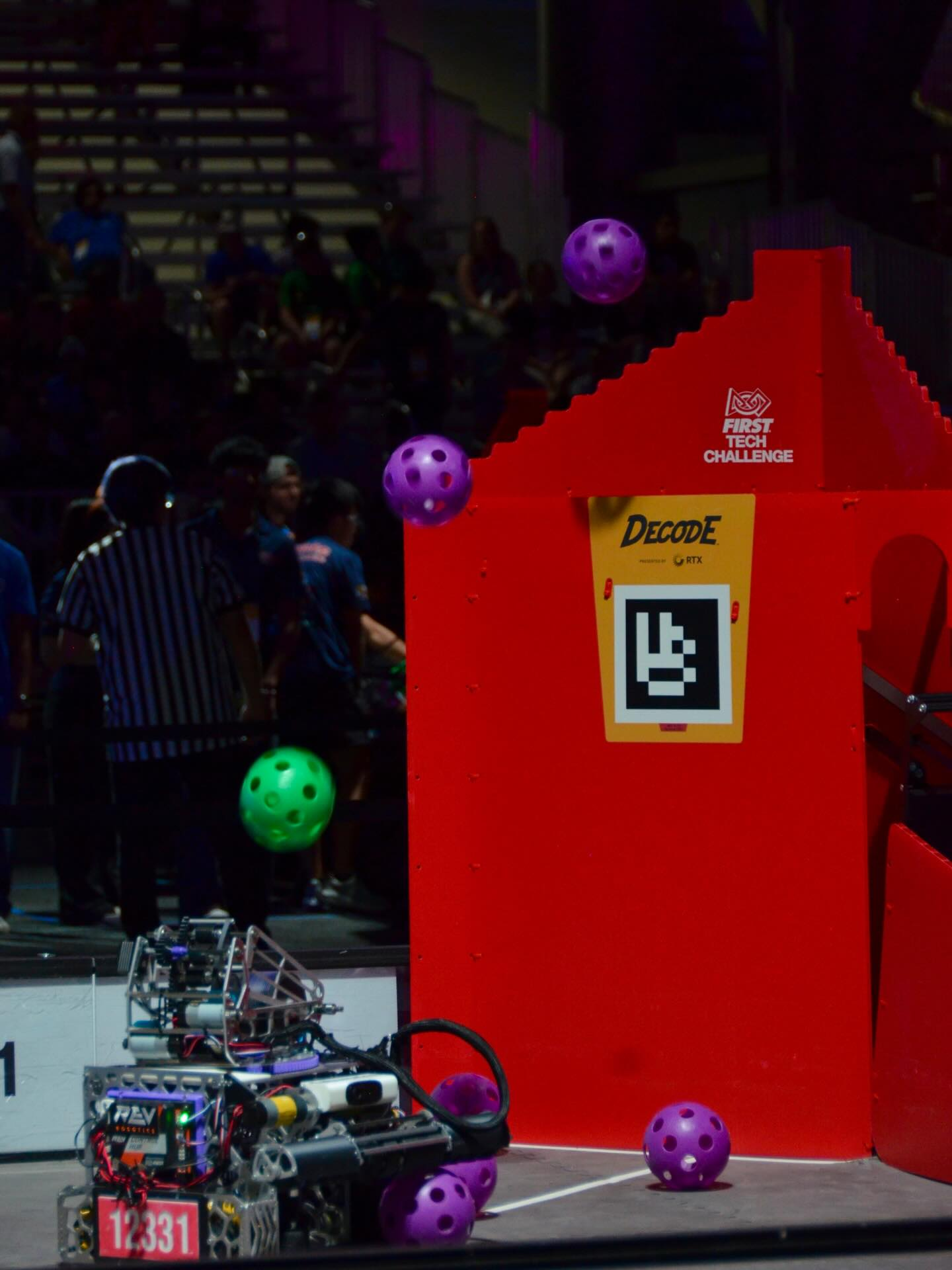
Robot of team 12331, the Scarsdale Robo Raiders, shooting three artifacts during the 2025-2026 DECODE World Championships.

Every year, in September, FIRST announces the game challenge to FTC teams at Kickoff. Qualifying Tournaments and Regional & State Championships occur from October through March. Teams are allowed to register for three Qualifying Tournaments. Some states, such as New Jersey, hold league meets that are more similar to sporting events. They are smaller and occur more often. For teams advancing from the United States, from the 2013-14 through the 2017–18 seasons, four Super-Regional Championship Tournaments have been held from March through early April, with the World Championships occurring in late April. Starting with the 2018-19 FTC season, the Super Regional Championships will no longer occur and teams will advance from their local championships directly to one of the formerly two World Championships in Houston or formerly Detroit.

=== Matches ===
On competition days, the number of matches varies based on the number of teams competing. Matches are completely random in their order and alliances. For the matches, teams are assigned to either red alliance or blue alliance, with each alliance consisting of two teams. All parties involved in the match must choose their OpModes before the match begins. Drivers must not touch the gamepad controllers during the first 30 seconds of the match, also known as the autonomous period. Then, the 2 minute driver controlled period starts and the match is completely driver-controlled from then on. In the final 30 seconds of the match, drivers attempt to park in a point scoring zone and/or complete tasks that can only be done in the end game period of the match. Prior to 2025, the winning alliance received two qualifying points while the losing alliance received zero. Now teams earn up to six ranking points in each match, where three are given for winning the match, and three are awarded for specific in-game objectives.

=== Judging ===
Besides matches, teams can advance through awards, which the judges give at the end of competition day. Teams are required to submit an engineering notebook and/or engineering portfolio in order to be considered for some judged awards. Before matches begin, teams are required to do a structured interview with the judges. Throughout the day, judges can and will observe the matches and conduct pit interviews with teams. After the end of matches, judges deliberate and discuss about the awards, and at the awards ceremony, judges present the awards. Winner and finalist teams with awards such as the Inspire Award can advance depending on the number of allowed advancements by the qualifier.

=== Gracious Professionalism ===
The core value that FIRST Tech Challenge promotes is embodied in the phrase "Gracious Professionalism." Showing gracious professionalism can be done in many ways, from helping another team, to simply having fun at competitions. It means making sure every team has an equal opportunity, and that no one is left behind.

== Events ==
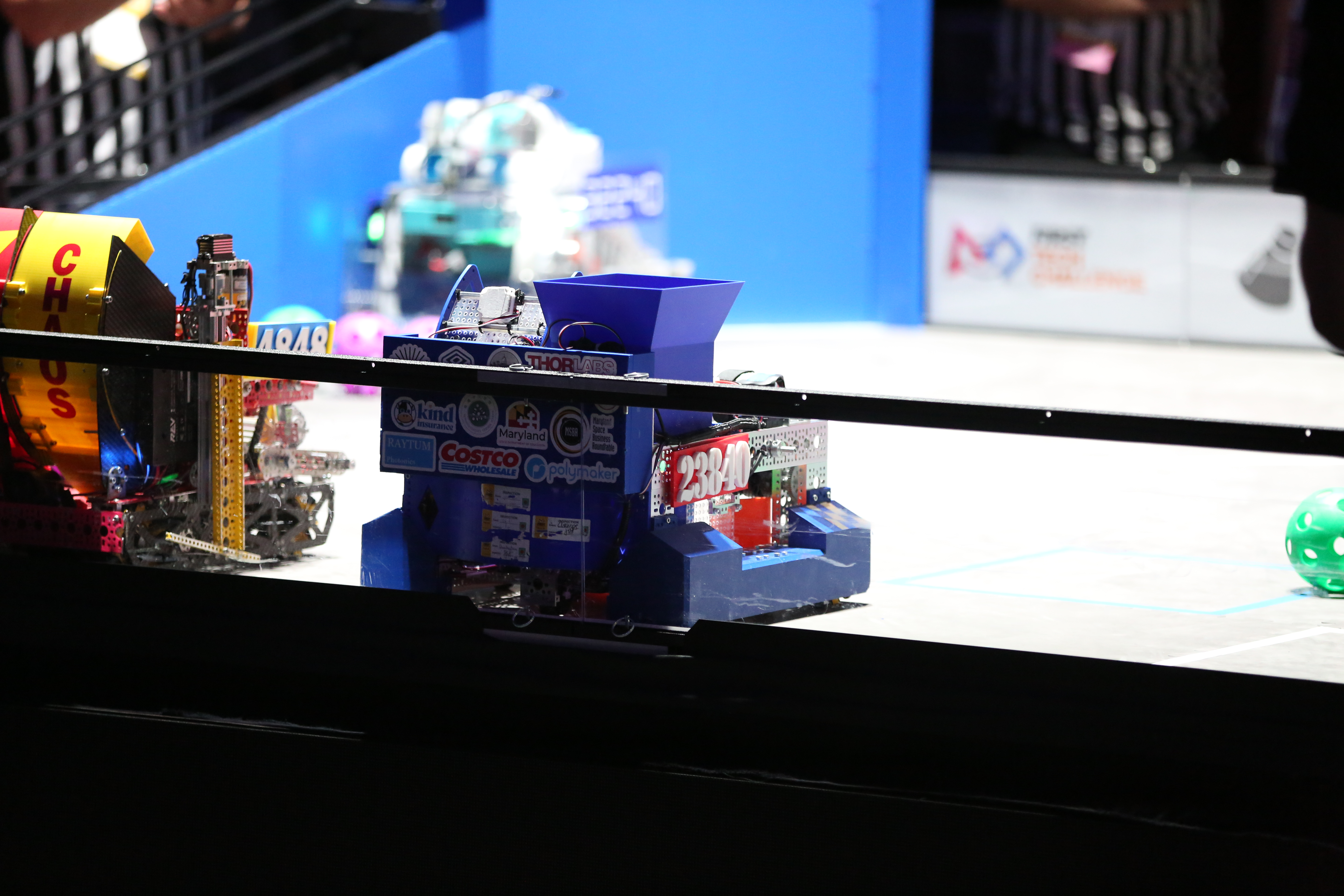
Robots of teams Howard Dynamics 23840 and Chaos 4848 at the 2026 FIRST World Championship in Houston, Texas.

Official FTC events are Qualifying or Championship Tournaments; unofficial events are Scrimmage Tournaments. Based on their performance in their Regional/State Championships (US) teams were invited to one of the World Championship based on predetermined advancement criteria. Winners of Qualifying Tournaments are invited to Championship Tournaments and until 2017–18 winners of Championship tournaments were then invited to Super-Regional Tournaments. After the winning alliances of the two championships were declared, they were invited to participate in the Festival of Champions in Manchester, New Hampshire to determine the FTC World Champion. On January 10, 2018, FTC announced that Super-Regionals will be abolished after the 2017–2018 season. Due to this, the number of FTC teams that attend each World Championship was increased from 128 to 160 starting in 2019. In the 2021–2022 season and onwards, only 1 World Championship is held in Houston. As of 2026, this event now hosts 336 teams, with six individual divisions which teams are split into.

Teams advance from one level of competition to the next based on the advancement criteria laid out in that year's Competition Manual. The Advancement criteria were changed for the 2015–2016 season to add criteria 7 "Winning Alliance, 2nd Team selected" and 13 "Finalist Alliance, 2nd Team selected," shifting the successive criteria down one position. In the 2025–2026 season, the advancement criteria was completely redone to benefit all-around teams.

=== Awards ===
In addition to the Winning and Finalist Alliances receiving recognition for their field performance; the following list includes awards presented at official Championship and Qualifying Tournaments based on judging criterion including engineering notebook, team interview, observation, and/or field performance, etc.: Award winners and finalists, especially those of the Inspire Award, are given higher priority for advancement to the next level of competition. Optional awards are not given at every competition and do not increase a team's chances to advance.

- Inspire Award: This award is generally given to teams who achieve greatness in all parts of FIRST including programming, robot design, the portfolio, judging presentations, gracious professionalism, and outreach. This team embodies what it is to be a FIRST robotics team and is a team that others can look up to as a role model. The Inspire Award is the highest ranked award as it embodies all other awards inside of it and allows a direct bid to the next level of competition.
- Think Award: The winning team of this award clearly displays their engineering and design process in their engineering notebook. This award honors the team who had an engineering section of their engineering notebook that clearly displayed the mathematics, science, and design process that went into the building of their robot.
- Connect Award: This award is granted to the team that most connects to their engineering community outside of FIRST by sharing who they are, what FIRST is, and how others can become involved. On top of that, this team's engineering notebook shows that they have a clear fundraising, business, and outreach plan that they will follow throughout the season.
- Innovate Award sponsored by RTX: This award is given to the team with the most innovative and creative robot design. This robot must work in a consistent manner but does not need to perform well in every round to be eligible for this award.
- Design Award: This award focuses on the design aspect of the robot. The team winning this award must show a thoughtful design on their robot that is both functional and aesthetic. The robot must distinguish itself from other competitors by showing off its unique design. This design can be shown both on the competition field and in the engineering notebook through sketches, blueprints, photos, and computer-aided design (CAD). CAD helps teams plan and create robots before actually building the robot in person.
- ~~Motivate Award~~ (now replaced by Reach and Sustain): The winning team of this award exemplifies what it means to be a FIRST team. This team works together by showing gracious professionalism at competitions and by recruiting and assisting other teams and members at home.
- Reach Award: This award recognizes a team that has successfully introduced and recruited new people into the FIRST community through outreach. The team must clearly explain their outreach objectives, strategy, and how these activities support the growth of FIRST, while going beyond their own robot to expand FIRST's culture. Teams are encouraged to act as loud and proud ambassadors for FIRST programs utilizing creative outreach and marketing materials.
- Sustain Award: This award celebrates a team's long-term program planning, stability, and financial sustainability. Teams who wish to win this award should showcase plans for ongoing fundraising, money management techniques, and how they build a multi-year budget or reserve fund for future hardware and registration costs. They should also show structured season project planning with goals and timelines that exemplify a team's organizational skills.
- Control Award: This programming centered award commends the team that had the best use of unique programs and successful sensors used in their rounds. This team's engineering notebook must have had a very detailed in explaining their implementation of software, sensors, and mechanical control.
- Compass Award: This optional award is given to a team that creates a 60-second video recognizing a coach or mentor, and highlights what sets them apart.
- Judge’s Choice Award: This optional award is given to a team that the judge's believe deserve recognition but wouldn't otherwise qualify for an existing award. The award can be given under a different name depending on the region.

== Competition themes ==
In the past, the challenges have been based on several different themes:

Year	Theme	Number of Participants	Number of Teams	Number of Events
2005-2006	Half-Pipe Hustle		137	6
2006-2007	Hangin'-A-Round	5,500	554	25
2007-2008	Quad Quandary	8,000	799	
2008-2009	Face Off	10,000+	986	39
2009-2010	Hot Shot!	11,000+	1,111	51
2010-2011	Get Over It!	16,000+	1,606	102
2011-2012	Bowled Over!	20,000+	2,100	201
2012-2013	Ring It Up!	27,000+	2,779	280
2013-2014	Block Party!	38,000+	3,800	310
2014-2015	Cascade Effect	45,000 (est.)	4,445	456
2015-2016	FIRST Res-Q	47,000 (est.)	4,711	600
2016-2017	Velocity Vortex	52,000 (est.)	5,222	716
2017-2018	First Relic Recovery	60,000 (est.)	6,021	754
2018-2019	Rover Ruckus	68,180	6,818	877
2019-2020	Skystone	77,560	7,610	
2020-2021	Ultimate Goal	49,210	5,172	
2021-2022	Freight Frenzy	70,400+		
2022-2023	Powerplay	87,400+		
2023-2024	Centerstage	99,000+		
2024-2025	Into The Deep	109,000+		
2025-2026	Decode			
2026-2027	Biobuzz			

== Notable people ==
=== Alumni ===
- Emma Dumont
- Rian Simpson

=== Employees and volunteers ===
- Joseph Bouchard
- Vikrant Bhargava
- Yaroslava Yuriyivna Boyko
- Joshua Eversmann

== See also ==
- FIRST - FIRST Organization
- FIRST Robotics Competition
- FIRST Lego League Challenge
- FIRST Lego League Explore
- FIRST Championship
