= Get Over It! =

Get Over It

Season Information
- Year: 2010-2011
- Number of Qualifying Tournaments: 42
- Number of Championship Tournaments: 45
- Championship location: Edward Jones Dome, St Louis, Missouri

Awards
- Inspire Award winner: (United States) Robots and Brain Bots Inc. - 4466
- Think Award winner: (United States) Artificial Stupidity - 2827
- Rockwell Collins Innovate Award winner: (United States) Landroids - 4220
- Motivate Award winner: (United States) *STAR* - 560
- Connect Award Winner: (United States) Power through Higher Innovation - 452
- PTC Design Award Winner: (United States) Livingston Lancer - 3415
- Champions: (United States) SD30 Robotics - 178 (United States) Wreckers - 577 (United States) MITibot - 2875

Links
- Website: FIRST Tech Challenge

Get Over It! is the robotics competition event for the 2010-11 FIRST Tech Challenge. Two teams compete to score points by depositing colored batons in various types of goals. The name of the game refers to the many obstacles that traverse the middle of the field, which include a mountain, two bridges, and two ramps (which are also goals).

== Rules ==
=== Alliances ===
The competing robots are organized into two alliances, Red and Blue. Each alliance is made up of two different teams, with one robot per team, who work together to score against the other alliance.

=== Field ===
The field is twelve feet long by twelve feet wide. Alliance stations are on opposite sides There are two zones, one for the Blue Alliance and another for the Red Alliance. The scoring objects are on the opposite side of the field relative to the alliance that will use them to score; that is, the Red Alliance's batons are in the Blue Alliance's zone and Blue Alliance's batons are in the Red Alliance's zone. Across the center of the field, there are several obstacles. At the very middle of the field is a traversable mountain, and on each side of it are balanced bridges, one red and one blue. Next to each bridge on the side opposite to the mountain is a cliff and a corrugated goal.

=== Scoring ===
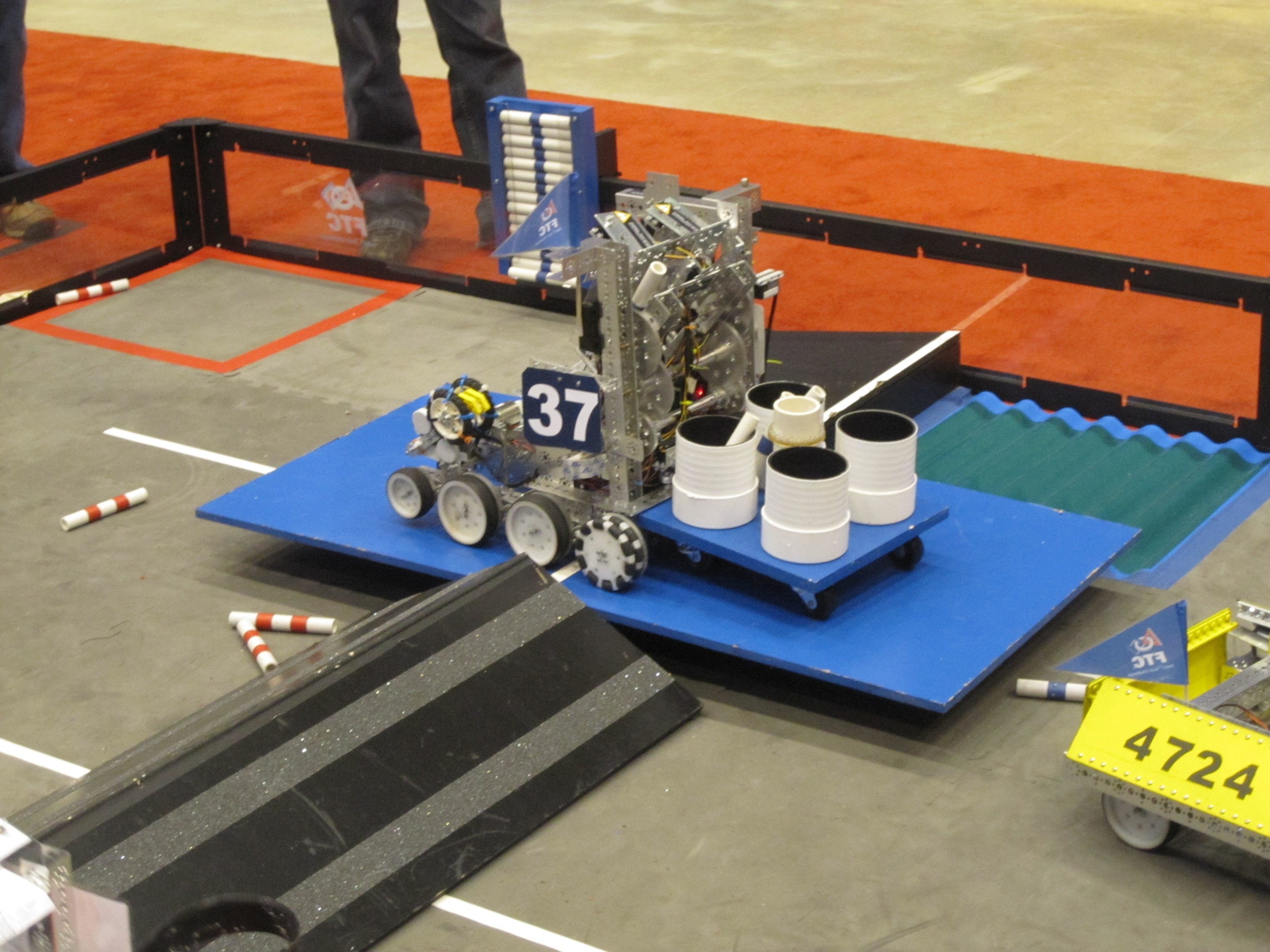
FTC teams 37 and 4724 playing Get Over It!

The scoring object for the game is a baton. 100 batons are available for each team to use. Teams may score with either teams batons, but if they take batons from the other teams dispensers, they get penalty points. When used, doubler and magnetic batons increase the value of the points scored in a goal.

Robots primarily use batons to score points (though many robots will score only in autonomous and the endgame period). Robots may also score points by parking in specific locations during the autonomous period and the endgame period.

==== Autonomous Period ====
As with previous years' games, there is a programmed autonomous period at the beginning of each match, followed by a human controlled period. The endgame is part of the human controlled period. This year the autonomous period lasts for 40 seconds.

Method of scoring	Points
Parking a robot on a Cliff	3
Parking a robot on the Mountain or Unbalanced Bridge	5
Parking a robot on a Balanced Bridge	15
Robot on Dispensing side	10
Dispensing Batons	2 / baton

In addition, any batons scored (using the rules below) are counted once in the autonomous period and again in remote-controlled period, doubling the score.

==== Remote-control period ====
During the remote-control period each team has two drivers control their robot using gamepads. The remote controlled period lasts for 2 minutes.

Method of scoring	Points
Regular or Magnet Baton in Stationary Goal	1
Regular or Magnet Baton in outside cylinder of Rolling Goal	3
Regular Baton in center cylinder of Rolling Goal	0
Magnet Baton in center cylinder of Rolling Goal	25
Doubler Baton in any Goal	Doubles the goal score

==== End-game ====
The end game consists of the last 30 seconds of the remote-controlled period.

Method of scoring	Points
Balanced robots or rolling goals on Bridge at End of Match	10 / element

== World Championship ==
This year's competition saw more robots in the FTC World Championship than any previous year. The championship was held April 27–30 in St. Louis.
