= Quad Quandary =

Season Information
- Year: 2007-2008
- Number of Championship Tournaments: 30
- Championship location: Georgia Dome, Atlanta

Awards
- Inspire Award winner: Panteras - 801
- Champions: Mr. T - 30; Team Overdrive - 74; Beach Cities Robotics - 23

Links
- Website: http://www.usfirst.org/roboticsprograms/ftc

In the 2007-2008 FIRST Tech Challenge robot competition, Quad Quandary is the first challenge theme replacing the former FIRST Vex Challenge, with similar general rules regarding the specifications of the robot and the game play. Unlike the previous challenge, Hangin'-A-Round, Quad Quandary makes use of small rings and movable goal posts.

== Robot rules ==
The largest acceptable size for the robot is 18"x18"x18". The teams may not introduce a new robot during any time of the match. No two identical robots are allowed on the match. Upon entering the match, all robots must pass inspection, and if modified immensely, must be reinspected. The robots must only contain Vex parts (however not all parts from Vex are competition legal) and not be potentially damaging to the playing field, other robots, and the players.

== The Challenge ==
The main characteristic of the Quad Quandary challenge is defined by its field, which is a 12' by 12' square divided into four equal quadrants. Each alliance (red and blue) are given two quadrants, of their color, on opposite sides of the field. The field is split using two diagonal lines. The challenge uses rings (placed on the opposite color's quadrants and mixed on the quadrant division line) and two different kinds of posts — two 18 inches (457 mm) high posts (atop the single goals), and two 24 inches (610 mm) posts connected by a 60 inches (1,524 mm) bar, which rest atop the paired goals. The bar rests 9 inches (229 mm) off the ground but during the match, can be raised up to 15 inches (381 mm). The rings may also be placed on a 3.5 inches (89 mm) high base, known as a goal (single or paired), that holds the posts. The goals are on casters and thus can be moved. There are also four, 20 square inches (129 cm^{2}) low goals centered along the edges. The rings used have a 3 inches (76 mm) inner diameter and are 1 inch (25 mm) thick. There are 50 rings total; 25 for red and 25 for blue. There are 44 total rings on the field, and three available to each alliance to load on their robot before the match starts.

== Scoring ==
- One ring in the low (ground) goal is worth one point.
- One ring on a single or paired goal is worth two points (the ring must be placed completely on the inside of the goal's outer edges).
- One ring "rung" on an 18 inches (457 mm) post is worth three points.
- One ring "rung" on a 24 inches (610 mm) post is worth five points.

(All rings scored award points for their corresponding colored alliance.)

- A single or paired goal that is in an alliance's quadrant at the end of the match awards that alliance 7 points (determined not by the area of the goal in the quadrant but by where the goal's post lies).
- The winner of the autonomous period is given a 10-point bonus.
