= Rover Ruckus =

Season Information
- Year: 2018–2019
- Number of teams: 6,818
- Championship location: Houston; George R. Brown Convention Center; Minute Maid Park; Detroit; Cobo Center; Ford Field

Awards
- Champions: Houston 3101 Boom Bots; 5064 Aperture Science; 6547 Cobalt Colts; Detroit; 9971 LANbros; 11115 Gluten Free 10091 N.Y.A.N. Robotics

Rover Ruckus, officially known as Rover Ruckus Presented by Qualcomm for sponsorship reasons, is the FIRST Tech Challenge game for the 2018–2019 season. In the competition, two alliances of two teams each compete to collect minerals and place them into the cargo holes of the lander. Rover Ruckus is the fourteenth FTC game.

== Alliances ==
In a match, there are red and blue alliances, both consisting of two teams. Alliances are selected randomly and work together to earn more points. The alliances claim their depot when both teams' robots place a team marker in the depot. During the Driver-Controlled Period, the alliances earn points for each mineral placed in the depot. If the depot is not completely claimed by both teams, then one of the opposing teams on the other alliance can steal the mineral.

== Field ==
The 12 feet by 12 feet playing field consists of 36 interlocking foam tiles and a one-foot wall surrounding the field. In two opposite corners, there are mineral craters and in the other two corners, there are mineral depots. In the center of the playing field, there is a lander that all robots may be mounted onto in the beginning of the match. The lander has designated side for the red and blue alliance and has separate compartments for silver and gold minerals.

== Scoring ==
There are three parts to the game: the autonomous period, the Driver-Controlled Period, and the End Game.

=== Autonomous Period ===
During the 30 second Autonomous Period, robots can only move using instructions that were pre-programmed and use inputs from sensors. Points are earned from landing, sampling, claiming, and parking. Robots that begin the match latched to the lander must hang at least 4 inches above the ground. To receive all landing points robots must have all wheels touching the ground. If a silver mineral is touched in an attempt to sample the gold mineral no sampling points can be gained. Team markers can be placed within the depot for 15 points. If both alliance parts claim the depot it is considered protected and minerals cannot be removed for the duration of the match.

Method	Points
Landing the rover from the lander onto the playing field	30 points
Identifying the gold mineral in the sampling field	25 points
Placing the team marker into the corresponding depot	15 points
Parking in the crater at the end of the Autonomous period	10 points

=== Driver-Controlled Period ===
During the two minute Driver-Controlled Period, two drivers operate the robot using gamepad controllers. Points are earned from placing minerals in the depot and placing the minerals in their appropriate cargo hold. No points are deducted for placing an incorrect mineral in the gold or silver cargo holds.

Method	Points
Placing the gold mineral in the gold cargo hold	5 points per mineral
Placing the silver mineral in the silver cargo hold	5 points per mineral
Placing any mineral in the depot	2 points per mineral

=== End Game ===
During the 30 second End Game, points are awarded for the Driver-Controlled period tasks as well as latching and parking.

Method	Points
Latching onto the lander	50 points per robot
Parking partially in the crater	15 points
Parking completely in the crater	25 points

== Advancement criteria ==
During qualifiers and state championships, teams advance in the following order: Inspire Winner, Winning Alliance Captain, Inspire 2nd place, Winning Alliance 1st pick, Inspire 3rd place, Winning Alliance 2nd pick, Think Winner, and Finalist Alliance Captain. Winning other awards (Motivate Award, Design Award, etc.) may help a team advance.

Rover Ruckus is the first robotics competition in FTC to not have a super regionals competition because of the increase in the number of teams and the cost to host an event is significant. Teams that win their state competitions will automatically go to the FIRST Tech Challenge World Championship, hosted in Detroit and Houston.
