= Ring It Up! =

Robotics competition

Season Information
- Year: 2012–2013
- Number of teams: 2423
- Championship location: St. Louis

Awards
- Inspire Award winner: (United States) Beta 3550
- Think Award winner: (United States) Robugs 4076
- Rockwell Collins Innovate Award winner: (United States) CyberKnights 3717
- Motivate Award winner: (United States) AHERT Ravens 5132
- Connect Award Winner: (United States) Pheonxtrix 3509
- PTC Design Award Winner: (United States) Fish in the Boat 4140
- Champions: (United States) Cougar Robotics - 4251 (United States) Fish In The Boat - 4140 (United States) Monkey Madness - 5096

Links
- Website: FIRST Tech Challenge

Ring It Up!, released on 8 September 2012, was the 2012–2013 robotics competition for FIRST Tech Challenge. In the competition, two alliances, each consisting of two teams, competed to score plastic rings on a set of pegs aligned in a three-dimensional tic-tac-toe board. Ring It Up! is the eighth FTC challenge. More than 2400 teams competed worldwide, surpassing the number of competitors in the previous year's Bowled Over! challenge.

== Alliances ==
In each match, the four teams competing were organised into red and blue alliances. The members of an alliance competed together to earn points. Alliances were selected randomly prior to the start of each competition.

== Field ==
The field for the competition was a square measuring 12 feet by 12 feet, which could be constructed by teams for practising prior to competitions. In the centre of the field there is a vertically constructed set of pegs, which are arranged in a three-by-three grid (as a tic-tac-toe board). Along the edges of the field, there are other pegs, each of which contains a set of six red or blue rings, which can be harvested and scored by the corresponding alliance. The field is also divided into two triangular sides, one red and one blue.

== Scoring ==
There were three sections to the game: the Autonomous Period, the Driver-Controlled (or Tele-Operated) Period, and the End Game. The criteria for scoring was different during each segment.

Autonomous Period

In the Autonomous Period, robots could run autonomously for thirty seconds. Infrared beacons were placed randomly on a peg in the tic-tac-toe board prior to the start of the match, but after autonomous programs have been selected. Each robot was allowed to begin with one specially-marked autonomous ring. Unscored rings were removed by referees after the end of the Autonomous Period. An infrared sensor is available to aid in autonomously locating the IR beacon.

Method	Points
Scoring autonomous ring on the same column as the IR beacon	50 points each
Scoring autonomous ring on any peg	"Ownership" of that peg

Driver-Controlled Period

During the two-minute Driver-Controlled Period, teams could use standard gamepad controllers, each with two joysticks, to operate their robots.

Method	Points
Scoring a ring on the center floor goal	1 point each
Scoring a ring on the first level of the grid	5 points each
Scoring a ring on the second level	10 points each
Scoring a ring on the third level	15 points each
Linear ring alignment (i.e. getting tic-tac-toe)	30 points for each line
Scoring weighted ring in corner goal	20% increase in points scored for rings

End Game

In FTC, the final thirty seconds of the Driver-Controlled Period are referred to as the End Game. During the Ring It Up! End Game, teams were permitted to attempt to score points for special tasks, but these tasks could not begin before the start of End Game.

Method	Points
Lifting alliance partner robot 1 inch off the floor tiles	30 points; 5 points for each subsequent inch up to 24 inches

== Advancement criteria ==
During tournaments and championships, match wins did not necessarily take priority over other advancement criteria. As in all FTC challenges, the winner of the top judged award (the Inspire Award) ranked higher than the winner of the competition-based component (Winning Alliance Captain). Winning lesser judged awards (Think Award, Connect Award, etc.) also played a part in the advancement order. The criteria for the Inspire Award are "...match performance, observations made during interviews and in the pit area, and the team’s Engineering Notebook as equal factors...". Criteria for the other awards also include robot design, creativity, innovation, team performance, outreach and enthusiasm.

For the Ring It Up! challenge, a new format for qualifying competitions was introduced in the United States regions for Florida, New Jersey, Pennsylvania, Washington, and St. Louis. Shorter competitions, called "meets", were held over weekends. Meets were smaller, shorter and more frequent than normal qualifying competitions. This makes the format more accessible for new teams, in addition to providing more opportunities for structured practice in the company of other local teams. They were designed for participation more similar to participation in organised sport at the high school age.
