= Block Party! =

FIRST Tech Challenge robotics competition

Season Information
- Year: 2013–2014
- Championship location: St. Louis, Missouri

Awards
- Inspire Award winner: 1st place - 3141: Bears Mexico City, Mexico; (United States) 2nd place- 5421: RM'd and Dangerous Rockville, Maryland; (United States) 3rd place- 4982: Cafe Bot St. Louis, Missouri
- Think Award winner: 5972: Patronum Bots East Troy, Wisconsin
- Rockwell Collins Innovate Award winner: 3595: Schrödinger’s Hat Fairbanks, Alaska
- Motivate Award winner: 3954: Watt’s Up! The Hague, The Netherlands
- Connect Award Winner: 4140: Fish in the Boat Lakeview, Minnesota
- PTC Design Award Winner: 3486: Techno Warriors Advanced Brandon, Mississippi
- Control Award Winner: 4092: Nanites, Portland, Oregon
- Promote Award Winner: 3595: Schrödinger’s Hat Fairbanks, Alaska
- Champions: (United States) 7013: Hot Wired Robotics; (United States) 5257: Eagles Robotics Xperience; (United States) 4240: Techno Clovers

Block Party!, released on September 7, 2013, is the 2013–2014 robotics competition for FIRST Tech Challenge. In the competition, two alliances, each consisting of two teams, compete to score blocks in plastic crates atop alliance-colored pendulums. Block Party! is the ninth FTC challenge.

== Announcement ==
The contest rules were announced at the headquarters of PTC in Needham, Massachusetts on September 7, 2013. A live audience of about 200 high schoolers and their mentors watched the unveiling by David Price (Regional Director of FIRST), Loretta Bessette (MIT Lincoln Labs and FIRST’s FTC game design team), Don Bossi (President of FIRST), John Stuart (PTC SVP of Global Academic Programs), and Lisa Freed (iRobot STEM Outreach Coordinator). The event was also live streamed.

== Alliances ==
In each match, the four teams competing are organized into red and blue alliances. The members of an alliance compete together to earn points. Alliances are selected randomly prior to the start of each competition.

== Field ==
The field for the competition is a square measuring 12 feet by 12 feet, which can be constructed by teams for practising prior to competitions. In the centre of the field there is a wooden "bridge" with a metal pipe that robots will hang on. On each side of the bridge, there are pendulums with crates. Under the pendulums, there are floor goals that are alliance-specific. On two of the corners, there are flags on PVC poles. In the other two corners, there are trapezoidal areas with plastic cube scoring objects. The field is also divided into two triangular halves, one red and one blue.

== Scoring ==
There are three sections to the game: the Autonomous Period, the Driver-Controlled (or Tele-Operated) Period, and the End Game. The criteria for scoring is different during each segment.

Autonomous Period

In the Autonomous Period, robots run autonomously for thirty seconds. Infrared beacons are placed randomly under a crate on the pendulum prior to the start of the match, but after autonomous programs have been selected. Each robot is allowed to begin with one preloaded block. Unscored blocks are left in the robot after the Autonomous Period ends. An infrared sensor is available to aid in autonomously locating the IR beacon. Robots can also earn points by being either partially or fully on the bridge in the center of the field.

Method	Points
Scoring autonomous block in the crate above the IR beacon	40 points each
Scoring autonomous block in any crate	20 points each
Scoring autonomous block in a floor goal	5 points each
Being partially on the bridge	10 points
Being fully on the bridge	20 points

Driver-Controlled Period

During the two-minute Driver-Controlled Period, teams can use standard gamepad controllers, each with two joysticks to operate their robots.

Method	Points
Scoring a block on the floor goals	1 point each
Scoring a block in one of the inner crates	2 points each
Scoring a block in one of the outer crates	3 points each

End Game

The final thirty seconds of the Driver-Controlled Period are referred to as the End Game. During End Game, teams are permitted to attempt to score points for special tasks, but these tasks must not begin before the start of End Game.

Method	Points
Raising the alliance flag in the corner of the field	20 points in the "low" position, 35 points in the "high" position
Hanging on the metal bar in the center of the field	50 points
Balancing the pendulum	50% increase in points scored from blocks

== Advancement Criteria ==
During tournaments and championships, match wins are not the largest part of the advancement criteria. For example, the winner of the top judged award (the Inspire Award) ranks higher than the winner of the competition-based component (Winning Alliance Captain). Winning lesser judged awards (Think Award, Connect Award, etc.) also plays a part in the advancement order.

For the Block Party challenge, a type of qualifying competition has been introduced in the United States. After qualifying at a regional competition, teams advance to a "Super-Regional", consisting of teams from many different states. There are four regions in the United States, and each region has a "Host Location" where the actual competition will be held.
