= Cascade Effect =

Robotics competition

FIRST Cascade Effect
Season Information
- Year: 2014–2015
- Number of teams: 3500
- Championship location: St. Louis, Missouri

Awards
- Inspire Award winner: (United States) Winner - 3595: Schrödinger’s Hat Fairbanks, Alaska; (United States) Finalist- 4082: RoboSpartans New Hartford, New York; (United States) Finalist- 5037: got robot? Elgin, Illinois; (United States) Finalist- 5890: e-lemon-ators Boerne, Texas
- Think Award winner: 3415: Lancers Livingston, New Jersey
- Rockwell Collins Innovate Award winner: 9048: Philobots Austin, Texas
- Motivate Award winner: 6055: Gear Ticks Lincoln, Massachusetts
- Connect Award Winner: 4924: Tuxedo Pandas Christiansburg, Virginia
- PTC Design Award Winner: 6299: Viperbots QuadX Austin, Texas
- Control Award Winner: 7187: Team Axis Lake Oswego, Oregon
- Promote Award Winner: 6002: Basilisks Pacifica, California
- Champions: (United States) 6433: The Neutrinos; (United States) 724: RedNek Robotics; (United States) 2844: Valley X Robotics

FIRST Cascade Effect, released on September 6, 2014, is the 2014–2015 robotics competition for FIRST Tech Challenge. In the competition, two alliances, each consisting of two teams of high school students, compete to score points by filling alliance specific goals. FIRST Cascade Effect is the tenth FTC challenge.

== Alliances ==
In each Match, the four teams competing are organized into red and blue alliances. The members of an alliance compete together to earn points. A Match consists of a thirty-second Autonomous Period followed by a two-minute Driver-Controlled Period for a total time of two minutes and thirty seconds. Alliances are selected randomly prior to the start of each competition.

== Field ==
The field for the competition is a square measuring 12 feet by 12 feet, which can be constructed by teams for practicing prior to competitions.Scoring Elements are 160 white plastic balls - large (40) and small (120). In the middle of the field is the Center Field Structure which contains two Ball Dispensers with trap doors held in place by Alliance-specific Kickstands. There are also two Center Goals - one Red and one Blue - with Infrared Beacons placed beneath each Goal. The field has six Alliance-specific Rolling Goals with clear Ball Tubes of various heights (30 cm, 60 cm, 90 cm) as well as two Alliance-specific Ramps, Platforms, and Parking Zones At the start of the Match, the Balls (large and small) are loaded in the Dispensers in the Center Field Structure. Each Team is given two balls (one large and one small) that can be pre-loaded onto their robot.

== Scoring ==
There are three sections to the game: the Autonomous Period, the Driver-Controlled (or Tele-Operated) Period, and the End Game. The criteria for scoring is different during each segment.

Autonomous Period

The Match starts with a 30-second Autonomous Period where Robots are operate via preprogrammed instructions only. Prior to the start of the Autonomous Period, the Center Structure will be rotated to one of three positions. Points will be awarded for Robots achieving certain tasks including placing Autonomous Balls in the Rolling Goal and/or Center Goal, Robots moving off the Platform, knocking over the kickstand (and releasing balls into the field of play), and moving their Rolling Goals into the Alliance's Parking Zone.

Method	Points
Driving from Platform On to Playing Field floor	20 points
Releasing the Kickstand to distribute Balls	30 points
Autonomous Ball In any Rolling Goal	30 points/Goal
Autonomous Ball In Center Goal	60 points
Moving Rolling Goal In Parking Zone	20 points/Goal

Driver-Controlled Period

In the next two minute Driver-Controlled Period, Robots are tasked with collecting Balls and placing them in the Rolling Goals. Balls Scored In the Rolling Goals are worth points based on the length of the Ball Tube and the Ball Height (at the end of the Match), as shown in the table below.

Method	Points
Balls Scored In 30 cm Rolling Goal	1 point per cm
Balls Scored In 60 cm Rolling Goal	2 points per cm
Balls Scored In 90 cm Rolling Goal	3 points per cm

End Game

The last 30 seconds of the Driver-Controlled Period is called the End Game. During the End Game, Robots may Score Balls into the Center Goal as well as the Rolling Goals. Teams can also earn bonus points for every Robot and Rolling Goal that is not in contact with the floor when the Match ends and by moving their Rolling Goals and/or Robots into the Alliance Parking Zone.

Method	Points
Robot / Rolling Goals In Parking Zone	10 points/item
Robot / Rolling Goals Completely Off the Floor	30 points/item
Balls Scored In Center Goal	6 points/cm

== Advancement criteria ==
During tournaments and championships, Match wins are not the largest part of the advancement criteria. For example, the winner of the top judged award (the Inspire Award) ranks higher than the winner of the competition-based component (Winning Alliance Captain). Winning lesser judged awards (Think Award, Connect Award, etc.) also plays a part in the advancement order.

After qualifying at a regional competition, teams advance to a "Super-Regional", consisting of teams from many different states. There are four regions in the United States, and each region has a "Host Location" where the actual competition will be held.
