= Hangin'-A-Round =

Season Information
- Year: 2006–2007
- Championship location: Georgia Dome, Atlanta

Awards
- Inspire Award winner: Occam's Engineers - 3053
- Champions: Occam's Engineers - 3053; Simbotics - 1114; EMP - 3230

Links
- Website: http://www.usfirst.org/roboticsprograms/ftc

Hangin'-A-Round was the name of the robotics contest at the 2006-2007 FIRST Tech Challenge (FTC). The contest involved building a robot from a kit that could attain a higher score than the opposition by placing the softballs into the colored goals, possessing the “atlas ball”, and by being parked on the platform or hanging from the bar.

== The game ==
Competitors were put on two-team alliances in the qualification matches. The competitors could place their robot anywhere on their side of the field. Each match had a 20-second autonomous period. During the autonomous period each robot's program could drive autonomously to score points without human control. Once the 20 seconds were over, the operators controlled them for the following 2-minute operator control period.

=== Scoring ===
The robots' main objective was to score softballs into a low corner goal for 1 point each or score softballs into a tall, triangular goal for 3 points each. In the center was a square platform placed on a dolly. On the platform was a raised bar, 36" off the ground, from one corner to the opposite corner diagonally. A robot parked on the platform and not touching the foam mats would win 5 points. A robot hanging from the bar at the end of a match without touching the platform or the foam would win 15 points. A large, yellow ball called the Atlas Ball was placed on the platform at the beginning of each match. The Atlas Ball would double the points that an alliance made by scoring balls in goals if it was mostly on their side. Also, the alliance that scored the most points in the 20-second autonomous period would gain a 10-point autonomous bonus.

== Championship Awards ==
=== Championship Winners ===
- 3053 Occam's Engineers
- 1114 Simbotics
- 3230 EMP

=== Championship finalists ===
- 3050 Jaws
- 3549 Rivited Steel
- 3652 FLAME

=== Inspire Winner ===
- 3053 Occam's Engineers
