= Decode (FIRST) =

Robotics event

Season Information
- Year: 2025–2026
- Championship location: George R. Brown Convention Center

Awards
- Inspire Award winner: (Brazil) 17792: Amigos Droids
- Champions: (United States) 30030: Exodus Winning Alliance - Captain; (Romania) 21087: Velocity Winning Alliance - 1st Team Selected; (United States) 11228: OverClucked Bots Winning Alliance - 2nd Team Selected; (United States) 18270: RoboPlayers Finalist Alliance - Captain; (Romania) 20265: Heart of RoBots Finalist Alliance - 1st Team Selected; (United States) 7172: Technical Difficulties Finalist Alliance - 2nd Team Selected

Decode, stylized as DECODE, or officially referred to as DECODE presented by RTX is the First Tech Challenge game for the 2025–2026 season. The Decode season kickoff was on September 6, 2025, and was broadcast through YouTube and occurred at many local kickoff events.

== Field ==
In Decode, two alliances of two teams each compete on a 12 foot by 12 foot arena made up of 36 interlocking tiles by scoring green and purple balls called artifacts into their alliance-specific goal, create patterns, and park at the end of the match. At opposite sides of the Decode field, in the front corners, there are two goals that artifacts are scored into—one for each alliance. There are white tape lines called launch lines that are parallel to the front face of each goal and additional launch lines that go perpendicularly from each goal to meet in the center of the field. There are also two more launch lines at the rear-end of the field, forming a triangle shape, starting from one tile from the middle on each side and meeting one tile from the edge.

== Scoring ==
There are three parts in an FTC Decode Game: Autonomous, TeleOp, and End Game.

== Advancement ==
Advancement points are used to rank FTC teams for advancing to the next level of play. Teams with the highest rank not already advanced will move up. The table below indicates how advancement points are awarded.

Type	Advancement Points Earned
Qualification Matches	A normal distribution of 2 to 16 points are awarded based on the rankings of teams at the completion of qualification matches with the highest ranking team getting 16 points and the lowest ranking team getting 2 points.
Playoff Alliance	21-α advancement points are given to each team on the playoff alliance where α is the alliance number.
Playoff Rankings	Points are awarded based on overall playoff alliance ranking.: Ranking / Advancement Points; 1st / 40; 2nd / 20; 3rd / 10; 4th / 5
Judged Awards	Points are awarded based on award placement.: Award / Place / Advancement Points; Inspire / 1st / 60; Inspire / 2nd / 30; Inspire / 3rd / 15; Generic / 1st / 12; Generic / 2nd / 6; Generic / 3rd / 3

== World Championship ==
The FTC World Championship occurred from April 29–May 2, 2026, bringing together 338 teams from around the world. The overall awards from the FTC World Championship and their subdivision champions are listed below.

Award Name	Team or Person Name	Team Number	Location
Inspire Award	Amigos Droids	17792	Belo Horizonte, Minas Gerais, Brazil
Winning Alliance Captain	Exodus	30030	Austin, Texas, US
Winning Alliance 1st Pick	Velocity	21087	Brǎila, Brǎila, Romania
Winning Alliance 2nd Pick	OverClucked Bots	11228	Zeeland, Michigan, US
Finalist Alliance Captain	RoboPlayers	18270	Irving, Texas, US
Finalist Alliance 1st Pick	Heart of RoBots	20265	Buzău, Buzău, Romania
Finalist Alliance 2nd Pick	Technical Difficulties	7172	Plano, Texas, US
Compass Award	Burçin Gündüz	25171	İzmir, Turkey
FIRST Leadership Award	Arjun Dasari	252	Providence, Rhode Island, US
FIRST Leadership Award	Anya Arun	21351	Charlotte, North Carolina, US
FIRST Leadership Award	Kuek Kuek	16010	Omaha, Nebraska, US
FIRST Leadership Award	Karime Lopez	5470	El Paso, Texas, US
FIRST Leadership Award	Ananya Purohit	25742	Folsom, California, US
FIRST Leadership Award	Chris Zheng	23280	San Diego, California, US
FIRST Leadership Award	Arnav Gaddamanugu	16290	Sanford, Florida, US
FIRST Leadership Award	Arhaan Jafri	20240	Austin, Texas, US
FIRST Leadership Award	Sofia Lana	17792	Belo Horizonte, Minas Gerais, Brazil
FIRST Leadership Award	Abigail Fenrick	22526	Fond du Lac, Wisconsin, US
Edison Division Winning Alliance Captain	Ai Citizens	19066	Focsani, VN, Romania
Edison Division Winning Alliance 1st Pick	ICE Robotics	11329	Bloomington, Indiana, US
Edison Division Winning Alliance 2nd Pick	Creative Minds	23305	Bellevue, WA, US
Franklin Division Winning Alliance Captain	Coyote	30110	Irvine, CA, US
Franklin Division Winning Alliance 1st Pick	Meta^Infinity	18221	Highland Park, IL, US
Franklin Division Winning Alliance 2nd Pick	MOB Robotics	10949	Cross River, NY, US
Goodall Division Winning Alliance Captain	RoboPlayers	18270	Irving, TX, US
Goodall Division Winning Alliance 1st Pick	Heart Of RoBots	20265	Buzau, BZ, Romania
Goodall Division Winning Alliance 2nd Pick	Technical Difficulties	7172	Plano, Texas, US
Jackson Division Winning Alliance Captain	Up-A-Creek Robotics	11260	Longmont, CO, US
Jackson Division Winning Alliance 1st Pick	ITKAN Solar	19564	Plano, TX, US
Jackson Division Winning Alliance 2nd Pick	Cheesy Bytes	23224	San Jose, CA, US
Lovelace Division Winning Alliance Captain	Exodus	30030	Austin, TX, US
Lovelace Division Winning Alliance 1st Pick	Velocity	21087	Braila, BR, Romania
Ross Division Winning Alliance Captain	Quantum Robotics	14270	Bucharest, B, Romania
Ross Division Winning Alliance 1st Pick	Ghost Robotics	3565	Westford, MA, US
Ross Division Winning Alliance 2nd Pick	ENFORCERS	7149	Egg Harbor Township, NJ, US

== Premier Events ==
Following a regional championship, teams may advance to a premier event or in some premier events can separately apply. There were 12 premier events in the FTC Decode season. Information about each one is listed in the table below.

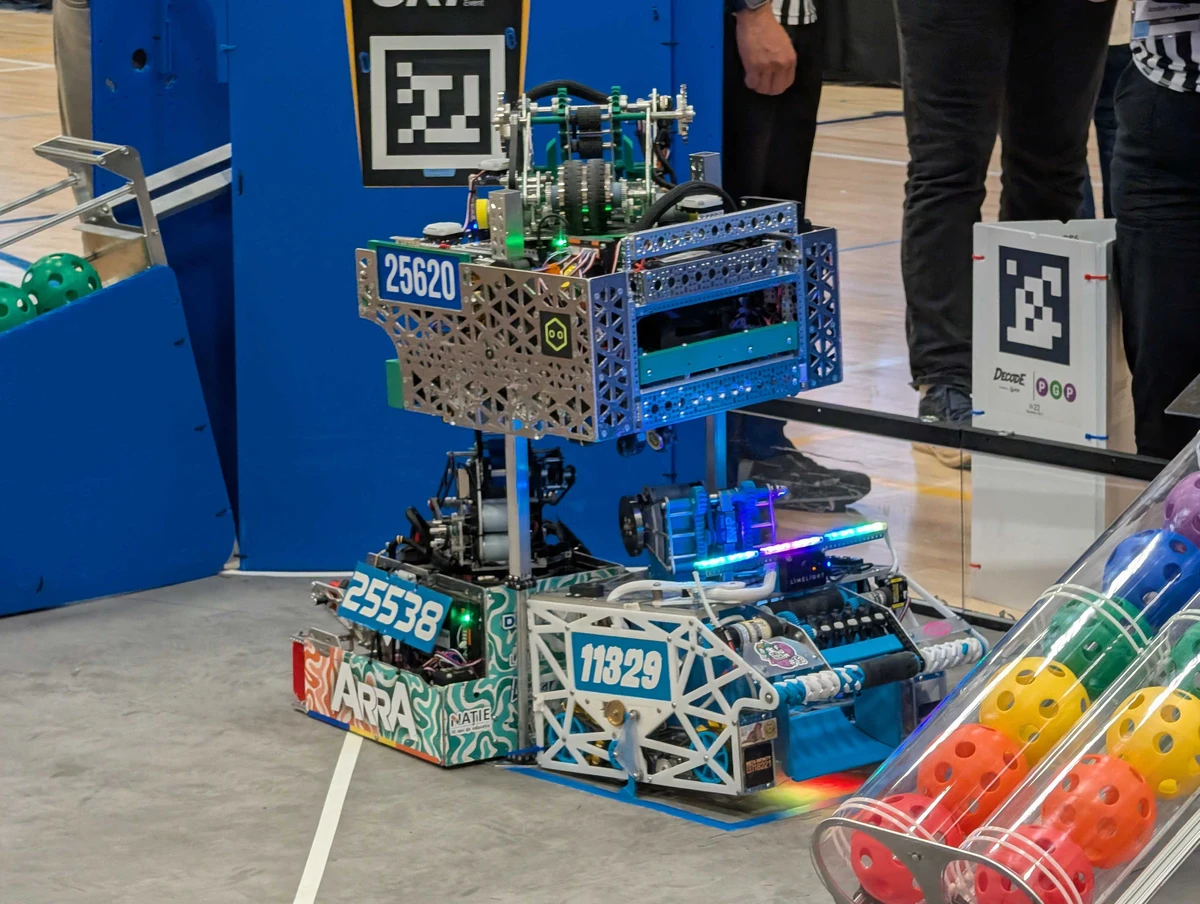
Triple Base Zone Park at the Chicago Robotics Invitation for the FTC Decode Season

Premier Event	Location	Dates	Description
New England Premier Event	West Springfield, Massachusetts	Apr 17 - Apr 18	
Run for the Robots Premier Event	Lexington, Kentucky	May 28 - May 30	
Western Edge Premier Event	Long Beach, California	May 28 - May 31	
Cowtown Invitational Premier Event	Fort Worth, Texas	Jun 9 - Jun 10	
Canada Cup - Niagara Premier Event	St. Catharines, Ontario	Jun 13 - Jun 16	
European Premier Event	Eindhoven, Netherlands	Jun 17 - Jun 20	
Michiana Premier Event Presented by GEARS	South Bend, Indiana	Jun 18 - Jun 21	
İstanbul Premier Event	Istanbul, Turkey	Jun 26 - Jun 28	
Mexico Premier Event	Mexico City, Mexico	Jul 23 - Jul 25	
Canadian Rockies Premier Event @ K Days	Edmonton, Alberta	Jul 24 - Jul 26	
Chicago Robotics Invitational Premier Event	Chicago, Illinois	Jul 24 - Jul 26	Modified game featuring a larger field, 3 team alliances, new game pieces, new ways to score, and more.
Carolinas Premier Event	Winston-Salem, North Carolina	Jul 25 - Jul 26	
