= Hot Shot! =

Season Information
- Year: 2009-2010
- Number of Qualifying Tournaments: 12
- Number of Championship Tournaments: 46
- Championship location: Georgia Dome, Atlanta

Awards
- Inspire Award winner: (United States) Rock ‘n Roll Robots - 25
- Rockwell Collins Innovate Award winner: (United States) Euler’s Number Pi the Speed of Light - 3595
- Motivate Award winner: (United States) Team Tiki - 2859
- Connect Award Winner: (United States) Team Unlimited - 1
- PTC Design Award Winner: (Canada) Roberts Creek Xtreme Robotic Minds - 245
- Champions: (United States) Smoke and Mirrors - 2868 (United States) Under the Son - 2843 (United States) GForce - 3864

Links
- Website: http://www.usfirst.org/roboticsprograms/ftc

Hot Shot! is the robotics competition event in the 2009-2010 FIRST Tech Challenge. Two teams compete to score points by depositing whiffle balls into designated areas.

== Game Overview ==
=== Field Description ===
Hot Shot! is played by four robots on a 12 foot by 12 foot field. Robots are paired together to form red and blue alliances of two teams each. Each alliance starts on a different side of the field, in spots designated by red and blue taped off squares. There are 3 goal areas, the low goal, the high goal, and the off field goal. The low goal and the high goal are centered on the field. The high goal has a pivot bar that allows it to be spun by a robot contacting the spin bar. The off field goal is four feet from the field. There are ball dispensers made out of PVC pipe, full of balls, at each corner of the field. There is a wooden deflector beneath each of the dispensers, angled toward the center of the field that makes the balls roll in different directions. The balls are released from the chutes by a pivoting trigger.

=== Round Timing ===
Each round lasts two and a half minutes. The first 30 seconds are composed of an autonomous period, where the robots are controlled completely by a program on the NXT. The next 2 minutes are a "Teleop," or remote controlled period where the robots are controlled remotely through the Bluetooth on the NXT. The last 30 seconds of the teleop period are known as the end game.

=== Scoring ===
The off field goal can only be scored in during the end game. The following points are awarded for normal white balls in each of the corresponding goals:

Goal	Points
Low Goal	1
High Goal	5
Off Field Goal	10

Yellow curve balls double the score in the goal that they are scored in. They can be released by the team captain during the end game.
