= Bowled Over! =

Robotics competition

Bowled Over

Season Information
- Year: 2011–2012
- Number of teams: 2100
- Championship location: Edward Jones Dome, St Louis, Missouri 25–28 April 2012

Awards
- Inspire Award winner: (United States) Landroids – 4220
- Rockwell Collins Innovate Award winner: (United States) Dent in the Universe – 5454
- Motivate Award winner: (United States) Geeks in Just Their Underpants – 3477
- Connect Award Winner: (Mexico) Bears – 3141
- PTC Design Award Winner: (United States) Antipodes – 4529
- Champions: (United States) Robocats – 4444 (United States) Masquerade – 4997 (United States) ILITE Robotics – 354

Links
- Website: FIRST Tech Challenge

Bowled Over!, released on 10 September 2011, is the 2011–12 robotics competition for FIRST Tech Challenge. Two alliances compete to score racquetballs into alliance-colored scoring goals. The name refers to two bowling balls on the field used for scoring points.

== Alliances ==
In each match, the four teams competing are organized into red and blue alliances. The members of an alliance compete together to earn points.

== Field ==
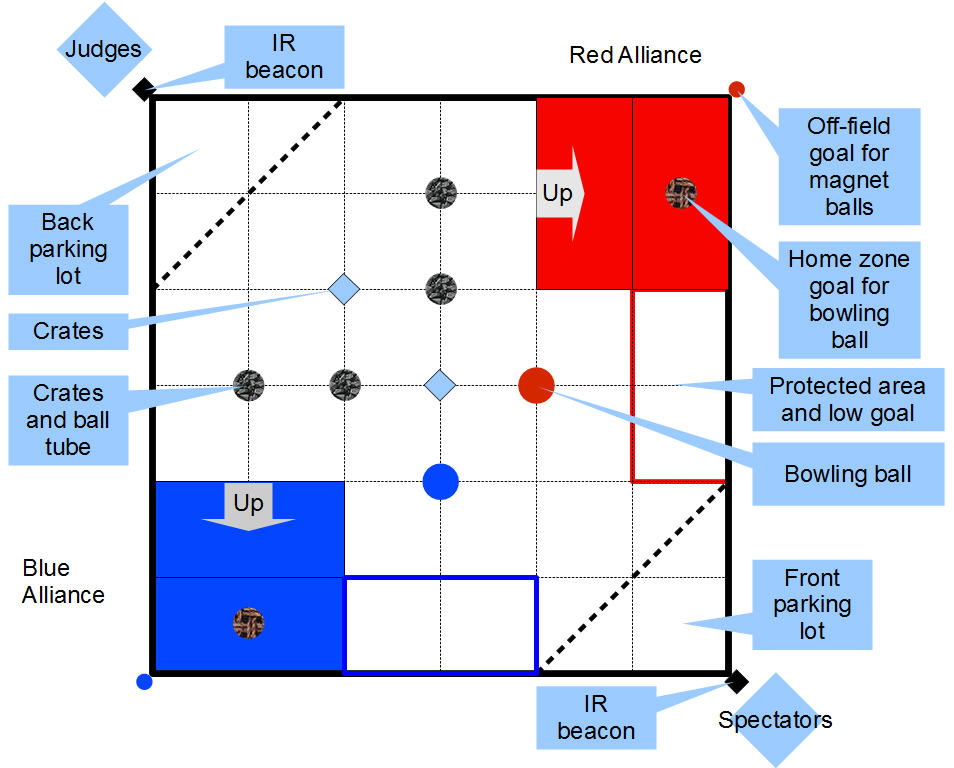
The playing field at the start of play. Two robots from each Alliance (not illustrated here) start on their respective home zone platforms. The grid on the diagram corresponds to the 2-foot by 2-foot flooring tiles.

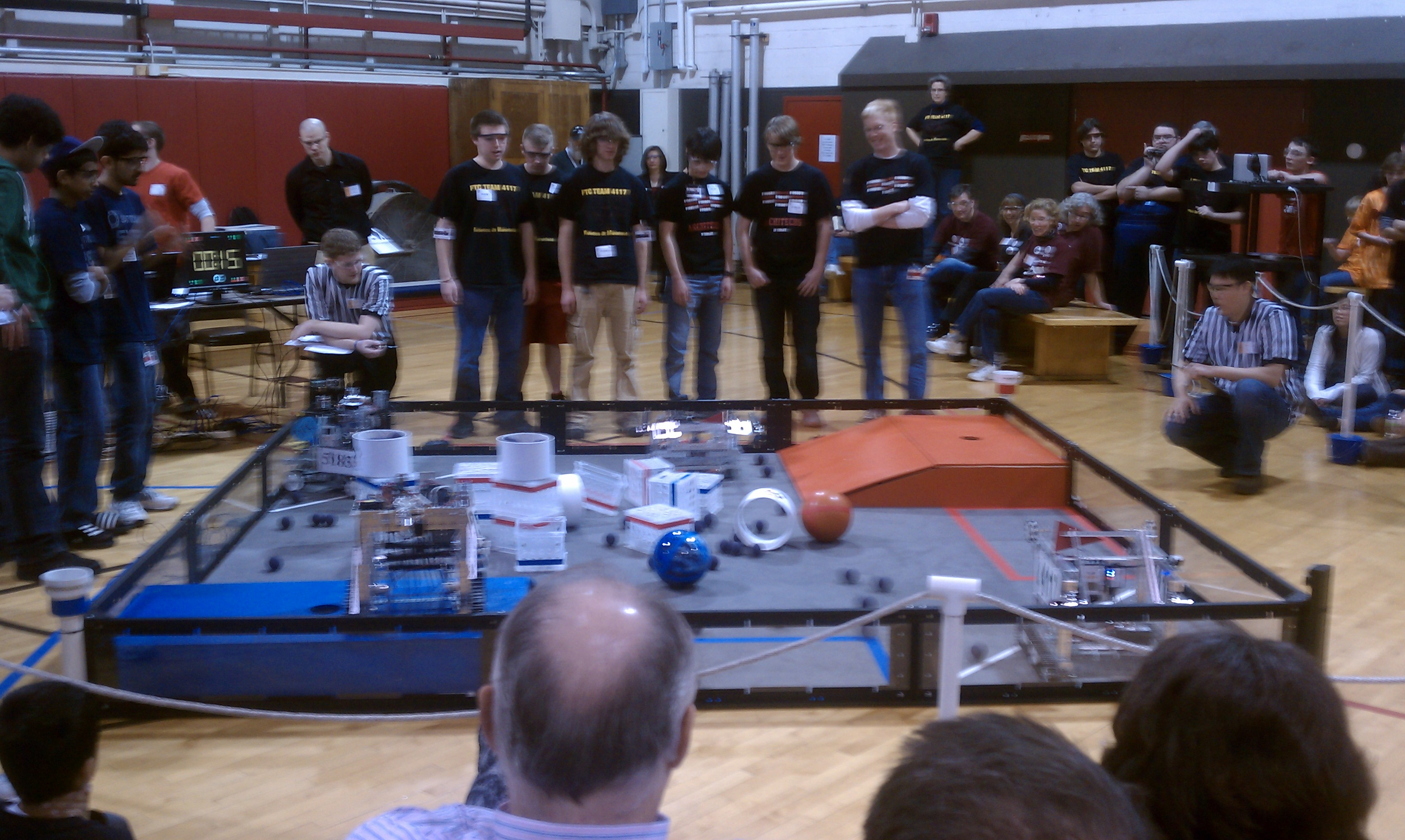
Real world playing field during a typical qualifying round. Similar orientation (i.e. blue is near left) to diagram above. Team 4117 ("Mostly Harmless", front right in this photo) has scored 10 points by parking in the front parking lot during the autonomous period. Team 5183 ("Sprockets", back left) has scored 5 points. (Boston University Academy in Boston, Massachusetts on 8 January 2012)

The field the robots play on is 12 ft by 12 ft in a diamond orientation with respect to the audience. In opposite corners (left and right to the audience) are ramps up to flat platforms on which robots start each match, colored for each alliance (called the home zone). On each platform is a home zone goal into which a bowling ball fits. In the corners without the platforms (front and back with respect to the audience) are the front and back parking zones. The two parking lot corners contain infrared beacons, which may guide the robots during the autonomous period. Between each home zone and the front parking zone is a protected area for each alliance.

Near the center of the field are 12 inverted ball crates that hold four containers of racquetballs (called ball tubes). There are 100 racquetballs, 12 of which contain a magnet. There are also two bowling balls, one of each color, near the field's center.

One highly effective method of scoring involved scissor lifts. As there was no upper-end cap on the crate stacking bonus (see below) several teams built 10–18-foot scissor lifts that would lift a crate, scoring 200–400 points. This score was virtually impossible to beat without the use of another scissor lift.

== Scoring ==
=== Autonomous period ===
The first thirty seconds of play is the autonomous period, in which the robot acts autonomously. Points can be earned in this period in the following ways:

Autonomous scoring
Method	Points
Uprighting a ball crate	5 points each
Parking a robot (back zone)	5 points each
Parking a robot (front zone)	10 points each
Parking a bowling ball (front zone)	10 points each
Parking a bowling ball (back zone)	20 points each

=== Driver-controlled period ===
The Driver-controlled period is a 2-minute period following the autonomous period in which the robot is controlled by human drivers. Points can be earned in the driver-controlled period in the following ways:

Driver-controlled scoring
Method	Points
Regular or magnet ball in protected area	1-point each
Regular or magnet ball in ball crate	2 points each
Magnet ball in off-field goal	25 points each
Crate stacking bonus	10 points for every 6 inches above 10.5 inches from the ground (crate must contain a ball)

==== End game ====
The last thirty seconds of the driver-controlled period is called the End Game. Additional points can be earned in this period if an alliance can push their bowling ball into their home zone.

End game scoring
Method	Points
Bowling ball in home zone goal	30 points
Bowling ball in home zone platform, but not in goal	20 points

== Advancement Criteria ==
During tournaments and championships, match wins are not the largest part of the advancement criteria. For example, the winner of the top judged award (the Inspire Award) ranks higher than the winner of the competition-based component (Winning Alliance Captain). Winning lesser judged awards (Think Award, Connect Award, etc.) also plays a part in the advancement order. The criteria for the Inspire Award are "...match performance, observations made during interviews and in the pit area, and the team’s Engineering Notebook as equal factors...". Criteria for the other awards also include robot design, creativity, innovation, team performance, outreach and enthusiasm.
