= Governor Simcoe Secondary School =

High school in St. Catharines, Ontario, Canada

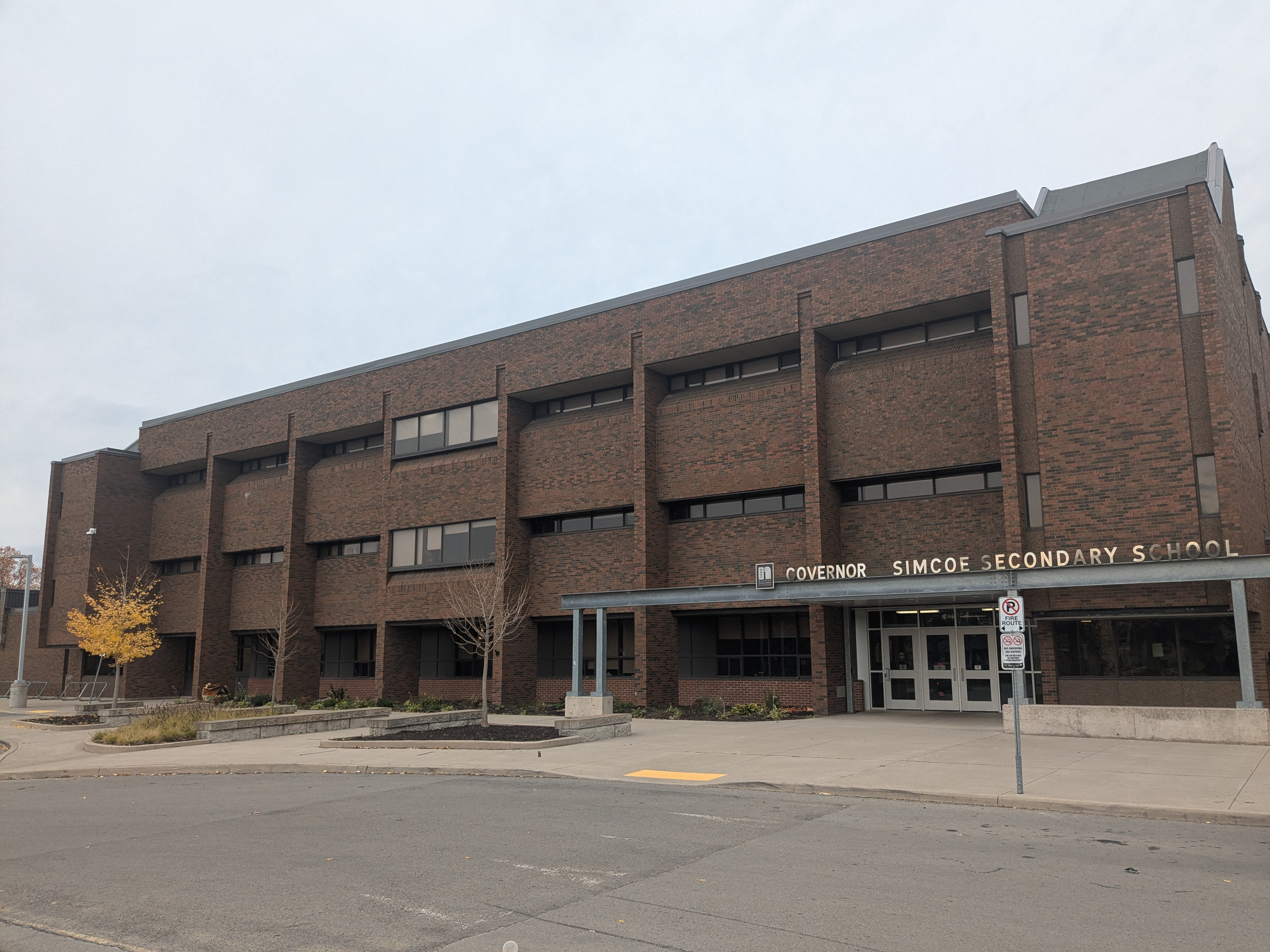
- The school in 2024

Location
- 15 Glenview Ave; St. Catharines, Ontario, L2N 2Z7; Canada; 43.20263°N 79.23375°W

Information
- School type: Secondary school
- Motto: Our House
- Founded: 1971
- School board: District School Board of Niagara
- Superintendent: Helen McGregor
- School number: 216
- Principal: Paul Taylor
- Vice Principal: Leslie Brophy
- Staff: 68
- Teaching staff: 48
- Grades: 9-12
- Enrollment: Approx. 859
- Average class size: 30
- Language: English
- Hours in school day: 6
- Colours: Red and grey
- Mascot: Redcoat
- Team name: Redcoats
- Website: govsimcoe.dsbn.org

Governor Simcoe Secondary School, named after John Graves Simcoe, is a public high school in St. Catharines, Ontario, Canada. It is a three-floored school with a theatre attachment. It opened in 1971. It was the first open concept high school in the Niagara Peninsula; the open concept has since been replaced with individual classrooms.

== Theatre ==
In 1995, the Grantham Theatre was added to the east end of the school. While originally designed to seat 1000 people, due to budget constraints, it was only built to seat 500.

The school has had its own productions of musicals. In 2017, students performed Beauty and the Beast. 66 students were a part of the cast. In 2019, students performed Into the Woods. The musical production for the year of 2025 was Freaky Friday.

== Robotics ==
The school currently has a FIRST Robotics Competition robotics team, registered as Team 1114 - Simbotics. The team was initiated in 2003 along with that years robotics season game being launched, Stack Attack. In 2012, the team won the FIRST Impact Award, formerly known as the FIRST Chairman's Award. The video submitted awarded them a blue banner, a ten year auto-qualification term into the FIRST Championship, and induction into the FIRST Hall of Fame.

Some notable team events include 2017 when two students on the team were photographed with the prime minister of Canada, Justin Trudeau. In 2022, they won the FIRST Robotics Ontario Provincial Championship and then moved on to compete in Houston, Texas.

== Robot History ==
Throughout the years, since documented from 2011 on the Simbotics website, the team has continued to name their robots with the prefix of "Simbot". This notable prefix has lasted for over the past decade and is paired along with a majority of the robot names starting with the character "S".

Although most bind by this rule, there are a handful of robots on Simbotics that are named not following this rule to tribute to the passing of team members, are a notable figure in society at the time, or are more fitting for the robot name for the year.

Team 1114 - Simbotics Robot History
Year	Robot Name	FIRST Robotics Competition Game	Code Release	CAD Release
2011	Simbot Steve	Logo Motion		2011 GrabCAD
2012	Simbot Jordan	Rebound Rumble		2012 GrabCAD
2013	Simbot B.A. Baracus	Ultimate Ascent		2013 GrabCAD
2014	Simbot Evolution	Aerial Assist		2014 GrabCAD
2015	Simbot Sideswipe	Recycle Rush	2015-Simbot-Sideswipe	2015 GrabCAD
2016	Simbot Sentinel	FIRST Stronghold	2016-Simbot-Sentinel	2016 GrabCAD
2017	Simbot Ali	FIRST Steamworks	2017-Simbot-Ali	2017 GrabCAD
2018	Simbot Smokescreen	FIRST Power Up	2018-Simbot-Smokescreen	2018 STEP File
2019	Simbot Snowstorm	Destination: Deep Space	2019-Simbot-Snowstorm	2019 GrabCAD
2020	Simbot Siakam	Infinite Recharge	2020-Simbot-Siakam	
2022	Simbot Sureshot	Rapid React	2022-Simbot-Sureshot	2022 OnShape
2023	Simbot Scizor	Charged Up	2023-Simbot-Scizor	2023 OnShape
2024	Simbot Skyfall	Crescendo	2024-Simbot-Skyfall	2024 OnShape
2025	Simbot Suzuki	Reefscape		

== Athletics ==
In 2014, students from Governor Simcoe won 11 medals in provincial championships for the Special Olympics.

The school has a football team with mixed grade students. In 2022 and 2023, the team made it to the regional semifinals.

== Incidents ==
In 2019, an 18 year old student went missing. The school honoured him in their graduation ceremony for that year and gave the Ontario Secondary School Diploma to his family. He was later found dead. Foul play was not suspected.

In 2023, a teacher was charged with sexual assault of a student.

== See also ==
- Education in Ontario
- List of secondary schools in Ontario
