= Rug Rage =

1993 FIRST Robotics Competition game

- Year: 1993
- Number of teams: 25
- Championship location: Bishop Guertin High School - Nashua, NH

FIRST Championship Awards
- Chairman's Award winner: Team 7 - “The Labsters”
- Champions: Team 148 - "Robowranglers"

Rug Rage was the 1993 game of the FIRST Robotics Competition. In it, teams competed individually to score as many balls as possible in their goal.

== Game overview ==
=== Field ===
Rug Rage field.

Rug Rage was played on a 40-by-12-foot (12.2 by 3.7 m), rectangular, carpeted field. The edge of the field was lined with PVC pipe. There were four scoring areas, two on each long side of the field set 6 feet (1.8 m) from the ends. The four robots started in the corners of the field and scored in the goal in the same corner. The goals had horizontal cross bars at their entrances creating an 11-inch (280 mm) opening. This allowed the small balls to roll in easily but kept out the 13-inch (330 mm) balls.

=== Gameplay ===
Four robots played individually in each 2-minute match. In the center of the field were five, 13-inch-diameter (33 cm), red balls worth 5 points and twenty, 6-inch-diameter (15 cm), water-filled, blue balls worth 1 point. The goal was to ferry balls into a team's respective goal and earn the most points. As the large balls couldn't fit under the goals' cross bar, they had to be lifted over. In the event of a tie, the team with the most large balls scored in its goal won.

== Robots ==
Robots had to fit within a 3-foot (0.91 m) cube and weigh no more than 50 pounds (23 kg). Unlike the previous year, robots were powered by an on-board battery and not an umbilical. Robots were controlled by an on-board Motorola micro controller. Commands were sent by the drivers through an 8 position joystick and a Termiflex keypad controller.

== Awards ==
The following awards were presented at the competition:

- Chairman's Award
- Most Creative Design
- Best Offensive Round
- Outstanding Defense
- Best Play of the Day
- Best Team Spirit Display
- Best Sportsmanship
- Number One Seed
