= FIRST Overdrive =

2008 FIRST Robotics Competition game

- Year: 2008

Season Information
- Number of teams: 1501
- Number of regionals: 41
- Championship location: Georgia Dome, Atlanta, Georgia

FIRST Championship Awards
- Chairman's Award winner: Team 842 - "Falcon Robotics"
- Woodie Flowers Award winner: Mark Breadner - Team 188
- Founder's Award winner: BAE Systems
- Champions: Team 1114 - "Simbotics"; Team 217 - "Thunderchickens"; Team 148 - "Robowranglers"
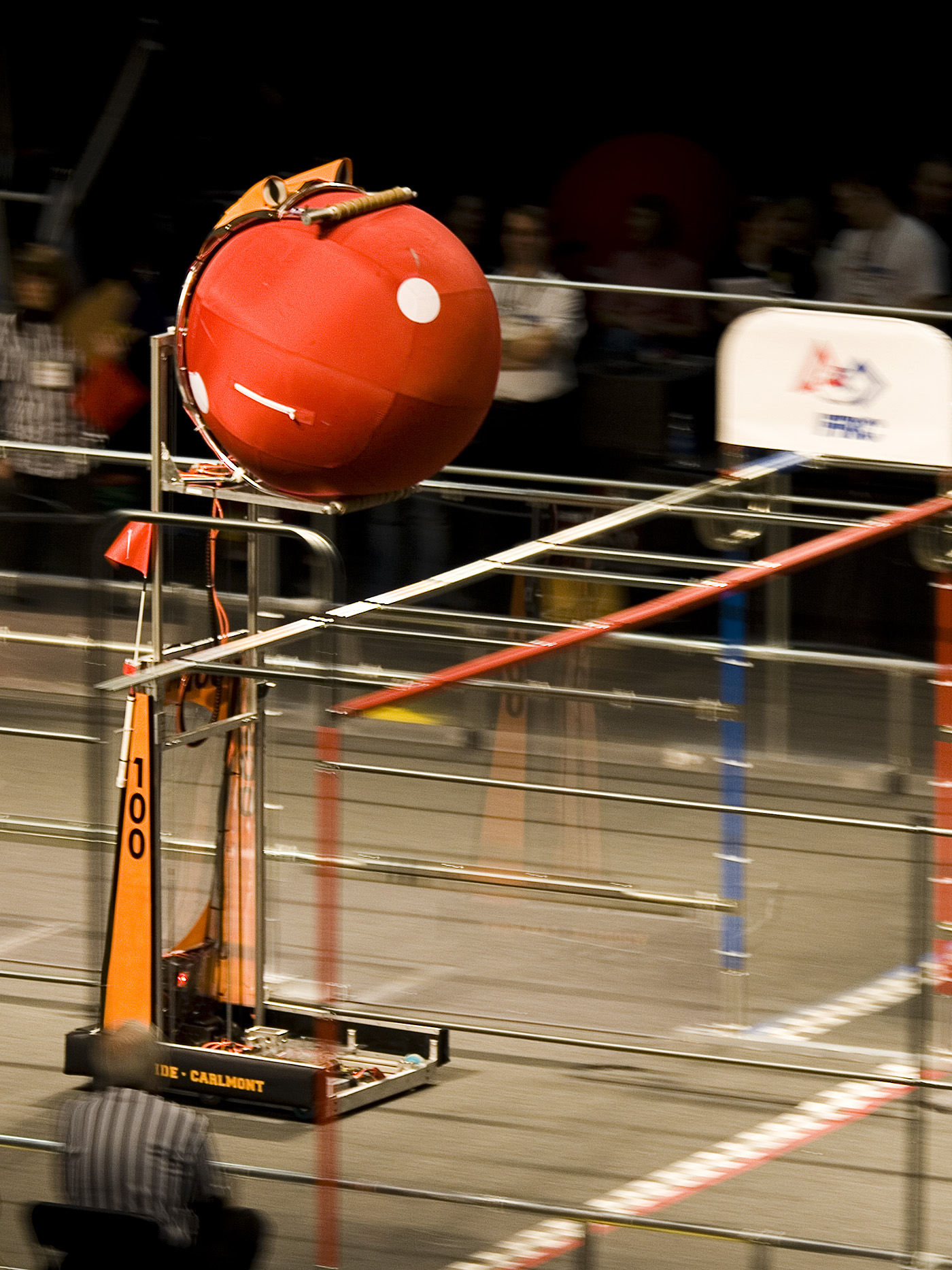
- A FIRST Overdrive robot carries a trackball over the overpass

FIRST Overdrive was the 2008 game for the FIRST Robotics Competition, announced on January 5, 2008. In it, teams competed to complete counterclockwise laps around a central barrier while manipulating large 40 in (1 m) diameter "Trackballs" over and under overpasses to score additional points.

== Game Overview ==
FIRST Overdrive is played on a 54 ft (16 m) by 27 ft (8 m) carpeted field, divided lengthwise by a fence median to create a track, and separate the field into Red and Blue zones. The fence is crossed by an overpass marking the red and blue finish lines, and hold the game pieces: 40 in (1,016 mm) diameter inflated balls called "Trackballs". Two three-team alliances race around the track in a counter clockwise direction while manipulating the trackballs to score points.

The game is made up of two scoring periods. The first 15 seconds of play is the Hybrid period in which robots are autonomous, and may also respond to certain digital signals sent by team members designated as "Robocoaches", who are stationed at the corners of the track.

The next two minutes of play is the Teleoperated period. At this time, robots are fully radio controlled by the team operators standing at either end of the field.

=== Scoring ===
During the Hybrid period, robots traveling in a counter clockwise direction score:

- 8 points for each of their Trackballs knocked off of the overpass
- 8 points for each of their Trackballs passed over the overpass
- 4 points whenever their robot crosses a lane marker
- 4 points whenever their robot crosses their opponent's finish line
- 4 points whenever their robot crosses their finish line
- 2 points whenever their trackball crosses their finish line

During the Teleoperated period, robots traveling in a counter clockwise direction score:

- 2 points whenever their robot crosses their finish line
- 2 points whenever their Trackball crosses their finish line
- 8 points whenever their Trackball hurdles their overpass

Alliances score an additional 12 points for each of their Trackballs that are positioned anywhere on the overpass at the end of the match.

=== Hybrid period ===
Hybrid period is a new addition to an FRC game. Rather than the pre-game autonomous modes of previous years where robots were prohibited from receiving input from humans, robots may receive signals via an infrared (IR) remote control or visible light from a designated Robocoach during the Hybrid period. The number of different IR signals the IR board included in the kit of parts is physically able to receive is 4. The number of distinct commands that are allowed to be sent is also 4, thus ruling out multi-signal combinations.

== Competition schedule ==
- Kickoff — January 5, 2008
- Shipping deadline — February 19, 2008
- Regional competitions — weekends, February 28, 2008 – April 6, 2008
- Championship — April 17, 2008 – April 19, 2008

== Events ==
The following regional events were held in 2008:

- Arizona Regional - Phoenix
- BAE Systems Granite State Regional - Manchester, NH
- Bayou Regional - New Orleans
- Boilermaker Regional - West Lafayette, IN
- Boston Regional - Boston
- Brazil Regional - Sao Jose dos Campos, Brazil
- Buckeye Regional - Cleveland, OH
- Chesapeake Regional - Annapolis, MD
- Colorado Regional - Denver
- Connecticut Regional - Hartford, CT
- Detroit Regional - Detroit
- Finger Lakes Regional - Rochester, NY
- Florida Regional - Orlando
- Great Lakes Regional - Ypsilanti, MI
- Greater Kansas City Regional - Kansas City, MO
- Greater Toronto Regional - Mississauga, ON
- Hawaii Regional - Manoa Valley, HI
- Israel Regional - Tel Aviv, Israel
- Las Vegas Regional - Las Vegas
- Lone Star Regional - Katy, TX
- Microsoft Seattle Regional - Tacoma, WA
- Midwest Regional - Chicago
- Minnesota Regional - Minneapolis
- NASA/VCU Regional - Richmond, VA
- New Jersey Regional - Trenton, NJ
- New York City Regional - New York City
- Oklahoma City Regional - Oklahoma City
- Oregon Regional - Portland
- Palmetto Regional - Clemson, SC
- Peachtree Regional - Duluth, GA
- Philadelphia Regional - Philadelphia
- Pittsburgh Regional - Pittsburgh
- St. Louis Regional - St. Charles, MO
- San Diego Regional - San Diego
- SBPLI Long Island Regional - Hempstead, NY
- Silicon Valley Regional - San Jose, CA
- Southern California Regional - Los Angeles
- UC Davis Sacramento Regional - Davis, CA
- Waterloo Regional - Waterloo, ON
- West Michigan Regional - Allendale, MI
- Wisconsin Regional - Milwaukee

The championship was held in the Georgia Dome, Atlanta.
