= Diabolical Dynamics =

2001 FIRST Robotics Competition game

- Year: 2001

Season Information
- Number of teams: 515
- Number of regionals: 13
- Championship location: Epcot Center, Disney World

FIRST Championship Awards
- Chairman's Award winner: Team 22 - “Double Deuce”
- Woodie Flowers Award winner: William Beatty
- Champions: Team 71 - "Team Hammond"; Team 125 - "NU-Trons"; Team 294 - "Beach Cities Robotics"; Team 365 - "MOE"; Team 279 - "TechFusion"

Diabolical Dynamics was the 2001 game for the FIRST Robotics Competition.

== Field ==
The playing field is a carpeted, rectangular area. Dividing the field in half is an 18 in (457 mm) high railing with a central bridge, which can tilt to either side of the field or remain level. Two 7 ft (2 m) high movable goals begin on opposite sides of the field. Around the perimeter of the field are two stations for human players, who work with remote controlled robots on the field to score points. At the start of each match, the alliance station contains twenty small balls. An additional twenty small balls and four large balls are located at the far end of the playing field.

== Robots ==
Each robot can weigh up to 130 lb (59 kg), and must start each match small enough to fit inside a 30" x 36" x 5' space (0.76 m x 0.91 m x 1.52 m).

== Scoring ==
Each match is a maximum of two minutes long. Alliances can end the match at any time. Alliances score one point for each small ball in the goal, ten points for each large ball in the goal, ten points for each robot in the End Zone, and ten points if the stretcher is in the End Zone. The alliance doubles its score for each goal that is on the bridge if the bridge is balanced, and multiplies its score by a factor of up to three by ending the match before the two-minute time limit. Each team receives the alliance score. A team multiplies its score by 1.1 if its large ball is on top of a goal. Scores are rounded up to the nearest whole point after applying all multipliers.

== Reception ==
While most participants did not like the lack of "red versus blue" competition within matches, others praised the game for its inventiveness and emphasis on cooperation. A few consider it one of the best FIRST games designed.

== Events ==
The following regional events were held in 2001:

- Kennedy Space Center Southeast Regional - Kennedy Space Center, Florida
- UTC New England Regional - Meadows Music Theater, Hartford, Connecticut
- SBPLI Long Island Regional - Suffolk County Community College, Long Island, New York
- NASA Langley/VCU/School of Engineering FIRST Robotics Competition - Virginia Commonwealth University, Richmond, Virginia
- West Michigan Regional - Grand Rapids Community college, Grand Rapids, Michigan
- Johnson & Johnson Mid-Atlantic Regional - Rutgers University, New Brunswick, New Jersey
- Lone Star Regional - Reliant Arena, Houston, Texas
- New York City FIRST! Regional - Columbia University, New York City
- Southern California Regional - Los Angeles Memorial Sports Arena, Los Angeles, California
- Great Lakes Regional - Eastern Michigan University, Ypsilanti, Michigan
- Motorola Midwest Regional - Northwestern University, Evanston, Illinois
- Philadelphia Alliance Regional - Drexel University, Philadelphia, Pennsylvania
- Silicon Valley Regional - San Jose State University, San Jose, California

The national championship was held at Epcot Center, Disney World, Orlando, Florida.
