= Maize Craze =

1992 FIRST Robotics Competition game

- Year: 1992

Season Information
- Number of teams: 28
- Number of regionals: 1
- Championship location: Manchester, New Hampshire

FIRST Championship Awards
- Chairman's Award winner: Team 191 - "X-Cats”
- Champions: Team 126 - "Gael Force"

Maize Craze was the game in the inaugural year, 1992, of the FIRST Robotics Competition. Gameplay consists of four individual robots, or “machines”, trying to collect tennis balls, or “treasure”, into their own home base. The field also includes an impediment to the robots consisting of a layer of loose corn kernels covering the entire playing field, 1-2 inches deep.

== Field and Scoring ==
Team 190 and others competing in Maize Craze.

Maize Craze is played on a 16 feet (4.9 m) by 16 feet square piece of plywood, 2.5 feet (0.8 m) above the floor, covered in a 1-2 inch deep layer of loose corn kernels. The field's perimeter is rimmed with 8 inch (20.3 cm) tall Plexiglas walls. The four home bases measure 20 inches (50.8 cm) square and one is placed at the center of each of the four edges of the field.

There are five posts on the field, one in each corner and one in the center. The center post is 12 inches (30.5 cm) tall and is capped by a high-value tennis ball worth 25 points. Two of the corner posts, at a diagonal from the other, are 36 inches (91.5 cm) tall and capped by high-value tennis balls. The remaining two corner posts are 24 inches (61 cm) tall and capped by medium-value tennis balls worth 10 points. 150 low-value tennis balls worth 1 point are placed around the center post. Robots remove high- and medium- value tennis balls from the posts and score them along with low-value tennis balls collected from the floor into their respective home bases.

A structure extends 25 feet (7.6 m) above the floor to support the electrical umbilicals for the robots.

=== Game Pieces ===
The only game piece in Maize Craze is the “treasure”, or tennis balls. There are a total of 155 available during a game, all staged on the field. Three high-value balls are staged on three of the posts, two medium-value balls are staged on the other posts, and 150 low-value balls are staged on the ground around the center post.

=== Scoring Areas ===
Each robot has a corresponding home base where they score game pieces and also where they are staged at the beginning of the match. To score, robots must remove tennis balls from the posts or retrieve them from the floor and place them into their home base. The winner of each match is determined by the total point value of the tennis balls in each home base.

== Robots ==
Robots are powered and controlled through 'umbilicals' hanging from the overhead structure and a 9-volt on-board "transistor radio" battery. The robots must fit within a 38 cm (15 in) by 50 cm (19.7 in) by 34 cm (13.4 in) box and weigh no more than 11 kg (24.3 lb). The robot could only be driven by two student members of the team, although an “engineer”, or mentor, is allowed to coach from within a designated coaching box.
