= Ramp 'n Roll =

1995 FIRST Robotics Competition game

Ramp n' Roll
- Year: 1995
- Number of teams: 59
- Championship location: Epcot Center, Disney World

FIRST Championship Awards
- Chairman's Award winner: Team 151 "Purple Twister" - Lockheed Sanders and Nashua High School
- Gracious Professionalism Winner: Team 191 - "X-CATS"
- Champions: Team 100 - "The WildHats"

Ramp n' Roll was the 1995 game for the FIRST Robotics Competition.

== Field ==
The 1995 playing field

The playing field is a carpeted modified T-shaped area. The goal area is made up of three ramps and two slopes leading to a square platform. In each match, three teams compete to put their own balls over a field goal.

== Robots ==
Each robot had to weigh no more than 70 lb (32 kg) and fit, unconstrained, inside a cylinder with a diameter of 36 in (914 mm) and a height of 30 in (762 mm). The robots used two 12 volt Milwaukee drill motors, four Delco car seat motors, and two Textron pneumatic pumps which, through a customized remote control system, were powered by two 12 volt Milwaukee Drill batteries.

== Scoring ==
Two points are scored to score a 24 in (610 mm) diameter ball over the goal and three points are awarded for passing a 30 in (762 mm) diameter ball through the field goal. In the case of a tie, the higher large ball in the goal area breaks the tie. If no balls are within the goal area, the large ball closest to the center of the top of the platform wins.
