= Ladder Logic =

1998 FIRST Robotics Competition game

- Year: 1998

Season Information
- Number of teams: 199
- Number of regionals: 5
- Championship location: Epcot Center, Disney World

FIRST Championship Awards
- Chairman's Award winner: Team 23 - “PNTA”
- Woodie Flowers Award winner: Michael Bastoni
- Champions: Team 45 - "TechnoKats"

Ladder Logic was the game for the 1998 FIRST Robotics Competition.

== Field ==
The playing field is a carpeted, hexagon-shaped area with an 8 ft (2 m) tall central goal. Three horizontal rail goals extend outward from the center. Each ball placed on the rail goals scores points and each ball in the center doubles the team's score. Around the perimeter of the field are three stations for human players, who work with remote controlled robots on the field to score points. At the start of each match, each team has 3 colored ball at their player station and three balls on the field, and three balls on the rails.

== Robots ==
Each robot can weigh up to 130 lb (59 kg), and must start each match small enough to fit inside a 30" x 36" x 48" space. The robots are powered by two Skil 12 volt rechargeable batteries and use motors from Skil, Delco, and Delphi Interior and Lighting, speed controllers from Tekin, pumps from McCord Winn Textron, air cylinders and valves from Numatics, Inc., and a programmable control system supplied by FIRST. Drivers use joysticks from CH Products and switches from Honeywell to remotely control the robots via a radio link which uses RNet wireless modems from Motorola.

== Scoring ==
Robots scoring balls in Ladder Logic.

In two-minute matches, the three robots and human players score points by putting rubber balls into the center goal and along the rails. The balls are color-coded to identify team ownership. Human players are not allowed onto the field, but they may hand balls to the robots or throw balls directly into the center goal. At the end of the match, each ball on the upper third of the ladder is worth three points, a ball on the middle third of the ladder is worth two points, and a ball on the lower third of the ladder is worth one point. Each ball in the center goal will double a team's score. The winner of the match is the team with the highest score.

== Events ==
All events. Legend:
Week 1
Week 2
Week 3
Championship

The following regional events were held in 1998:

Week 1

- Houston Regional - Johnson Space Center, Houston

Week 2

- Motorola Midwest Regional - William Rainey Harper College, Chicago
- DEKA New England Regional - New Hampshire College (now Southern New Hampshire University), Manchester, NH

Week 3

- Johnson & Johnson Mid-Atlantic Regional - Rutgers University, New Brunswick, NJ
- Great Lakes Regional - Eastern Michigan University, Detroit

The national championship was held at Epcot Center, Disney World, Orlando.
