= Hexagon Havoc =

1996 FIRST Robotics Competition game

- Year: 1996
- Number of teams: 94
- Championship location: Epcot Center, Disney World

FIRST Championship Awards
- Chairman's Award winner: Team 144 - "Operation Orange"
- Woodie Flowers Award winner: Woodie Flowers
- Founder's Award winner: City of Manchester, NH
- Champions: Team 73 - "Tigerbolt"

Hexagon Havoc was the 1996 game for the FIRST Robotics Competition. Seeding games of 1-on-1-on-1 were played double-elimination to determine the teams for the finals rounds. In the finals, robots played 1-on-1 in a best 2 out of 3.

== Field ==
The playing field was a carpeted, hexagon-shaped area with a central goal. Around the perimeter of the field were three stations for the human players who assisted the remote controlled robots on the field to score points. There were twelve 8 in (203 mm) diameter balls and two 24 in (610 mm) diameter balls per team, color-coded by team. At the start of each match, all of the small balls and three of the large balls are on the playing field, while the other three large balls are located on the triangular corners of the central goal.

== Robots ==
Each robot had to weigh no more than 120 lb (54 kg) and fit unconstrained inside a 36 in (914 mm) cube. The robots used two 12 volt Milwaukee drill motors, four Delco car seat motors, and two Textron pneumatic pumps which were operated through a customized remote-control system.

== Scoring ==
In two-minute matches, the three robots, with their human partners, scored points by placing the balls in the central goal. The balls were carried, pushed or thrown into the goal by the robots. The human players could score by throwing balls into the central goal, but were not allowed on the playing field as they were seat-belted down at their stations.

Points were awarded for balls located in the central goal at the conclusion of each two-minute match. Each small ball in or above the hexagonal portion of the central goal was worth three points. Each large ball located in or above the hexagonal portion of the central goal was worth ten points. Each large ball on or over the triangular corners of the goal was worth five points. The team with the highest score in a match was the winner. In the case of a tie, the team with the highest large ball in the goal won. If no large balls were in the goal ties were broken by the large ball closest to the center of the goal.
