= Zone Zeal =

2002 FIRST Robotics Competition game

- Year: 2002

Season Information
- Number of teams: 642
- Number of regionals: 16
- Championship location: Epcot Center, Disney World

FIRST Championship Awards
- Chairman's Award winner: Team 175 - "BUZZ"
- Woodie Flowers Award winner: Dave Verbrugge
- Champions: Team 66 - "Flyers"; Team 71 - "Team Hammond"; Team 173 - "Rage"

Zone Zeal was the 2002 game for the FIRST Robotics Competition. In it, robots, playing in alliances of two competed to move goals and balls into various zones within the playing field.

== Playing Field ==
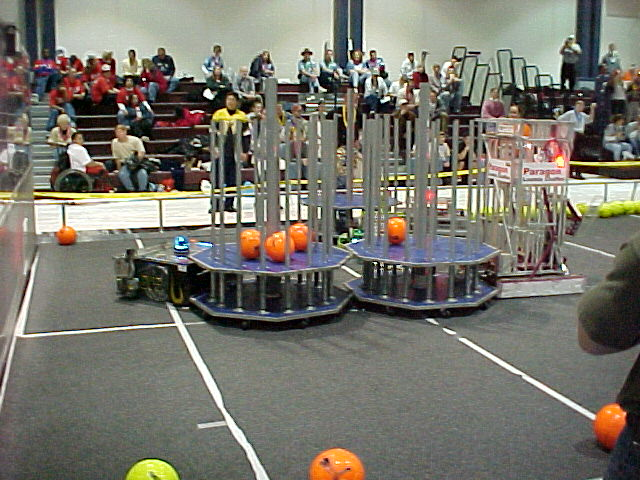
A zone zeal game in progress. Click on the image for more details

The playing field was divided into fifths called zones. At the beginning of the match, there were 40 balls arranged along the sides of the field in the center zone and the two adjacent zones. In the center zone were three mobile goals.

The zones were numbered 1 to 5. The Blue team could score by placing ball-filled goals in zones 4 or 5, and could score a bonus 10 points for every goal in zone 4. At the end of the match, for every robot Blue had in zone 1, Blue would score 10 points. For the red alliance, it was the opposite. Balls could be scored in zones 1 or 2, goals would receive bonus points for being in zone 2, and robots scored 10 points each for ending the match in zone 5.

== Scoring ==
The primary source of points in Zone Zeal was placing balls in the mobile goals, then moving the goal into the appropriate zone. For every ball in a goal, an alliance received 1 point. For every goal in the alliance's goal zone at the end of the match, the alliance would receive 10 points. Further, the team received 10 points for every robot in the robot zone at the end of the match.

== Events ==
The following regional events were held in 2002:

- Buckeye Regional - Cleveland, Ohio
- Canadian Regional - Mississauga, Ontario
- Great Lakes Regional - Ypsilanti, Michigan
- Johnson & Johnson Mid-Atlantic Regional - New Brunswick, New Jersey
- Lone Star Regional - Houston, Texas
- Motorola Midwest Regional - Evanston, Illinois
- NASA Kennedy Space Center Southeast Regional - Kennedy Space Center, Florida
- NASA Langley/VCU/School of Engineering - Richmond, Virginia
- New York City Regional - New York City
- Pacific Northwest Regional - Seattle, Washington
- Philadelphia Regional - Philadelphia, Pennsylvania
- SBPLI Long Island Regional - Long Island, New York
- Silicon Valley Regional - San Jose, California
- Southern California Regional - Los Angeles, California
- Western Michigan Regional - Grand Rapids, Michigan
- UTC New England Regional - New Haven, Connecticut

The championship was held at Epcot Center, Disney World, Orlando.
