= FIRST Robotics Competition =

International high school robotics competition

- Upcoming season or competition: Biocore
- Sport: Robotics-related games
- Founded: Dean Kamen; Woodie Flowers
- First season: 1992
- Commissioner: Collin Fultz
- Motto: "More Than Robots"
- No. of teams: 3724 (2026)
- Countries: 30 countries and regions: United States; Canada; Turkey; Mexico; Brazil; Israel; Australia; China; Chinese Taipei; India; Japan; Dominican Republic; France; Panama; Czech Republic; Netherlands; South Africa; United Kingdom; Argentina; Azerbaijan; Belize; Bulgaria; Colombia; Croatia; Greece; Hungary; Philippines; Poland; Singapore; Switzerland
- Most recent champions: 4414 - HighTide; 1323 - MadTown Robotics; 4065 - Nerds of Prey; 1538 - The Holy Cows (2026)
- Most titles: 254 - "The Cheesy Poofs" (5)

The FIRST Robotics Competition (FRC) is an international high school robotics competition operated by FIRST. Each year, the organization designs a game around various tasks, and teams of high school students, coaches, and mentors build robots to play it. Tasks have included shooting balls into goals, hanging on bars, placing objects in predetermined locations, and balancing robots on field elements. Teams are given a set of parts during the annual Kickoff; they are encouraged to purchase or fabricate specialized components.

FIRST Robotics Competition is one of five robotics competition programs organized by FIRST, along with FIRST LEGO League Discover, FIRST LEGO League Explore, FIRST LEGO League Challenge, and FIRST Tech Challenge.

The program aims to inspire students to be science and technology leaders. It urges participants to demonstrate two values: "Gracious Professionalism", or help, empathy, and respect for other teams; and "Coopertition", the idea that teams can cooperate and compete at the same time.

In 2024, the 33rd year of the competition, robots were built by 3,468 teams in 28 countries, comprising more than 86,700 students and 27,700 mentors. Events included 62 Regional Competitions, 98 District Qualifying Competitions, and 11 District Championships. More than 600 teams received invitations to attend the FIRST Championship tournament. In addition to on-field competition, teams and team members competed for awards recognizing entrepreneurship, creativity, engineering, industrial design, safety, controls, media, quality, and exemplifying the core values of the program. The COVID-19 pandemic dampened participation during the 2021 season.

== History ==
1992: Maize Craze

FIRST was founded in 1989 by American inventor and entrepreneur Dean Kamen, who has since voluntarily resigned from his position. With inspiration and assistance from physicist and MIT professor emeritus Woodie Flowers, Kamen sought to increase the number of kids—particularly women and minorities—who consider science and technology careers. He looked for activities that captured the enthusiasm of students and decided that combining the excitement of sports competition with science and technology could inspire students.

Distilling what sports had done right into a recipe for engaging young people, Kamen says, turned out to be relatively straightforward. "It's after school, not in school. It's aspirational, not required," he explained to me.

"You don't get quizzes and tests, you go into competitions and get trophies and letters. You don't have teachers, you have coaches. You nurture, you don't judge. You create teamwork between all the participants. We justify sports for teamwork but why, when we do it in the classroom, do we call it cheating?"

Most of all, it was a nonjudgmental space, where in contrast science and math in traditional educational settings had been soured with embarrassment and uncertainty.

Kamen has stated that FIRST is the invention he feels most proud of and predicts that participants will lead technological advances in years to come. The first FRC season was in 1992 and had one event at a high school gymnasium in New Hampshire. That first competition was relatively small, similar in size to today's FIRST Tech Challenge and Vex Robotics Competition games. Robots used a wire to receive data from drivers; in the following year, it switched to a wireless system.

== Teams ==
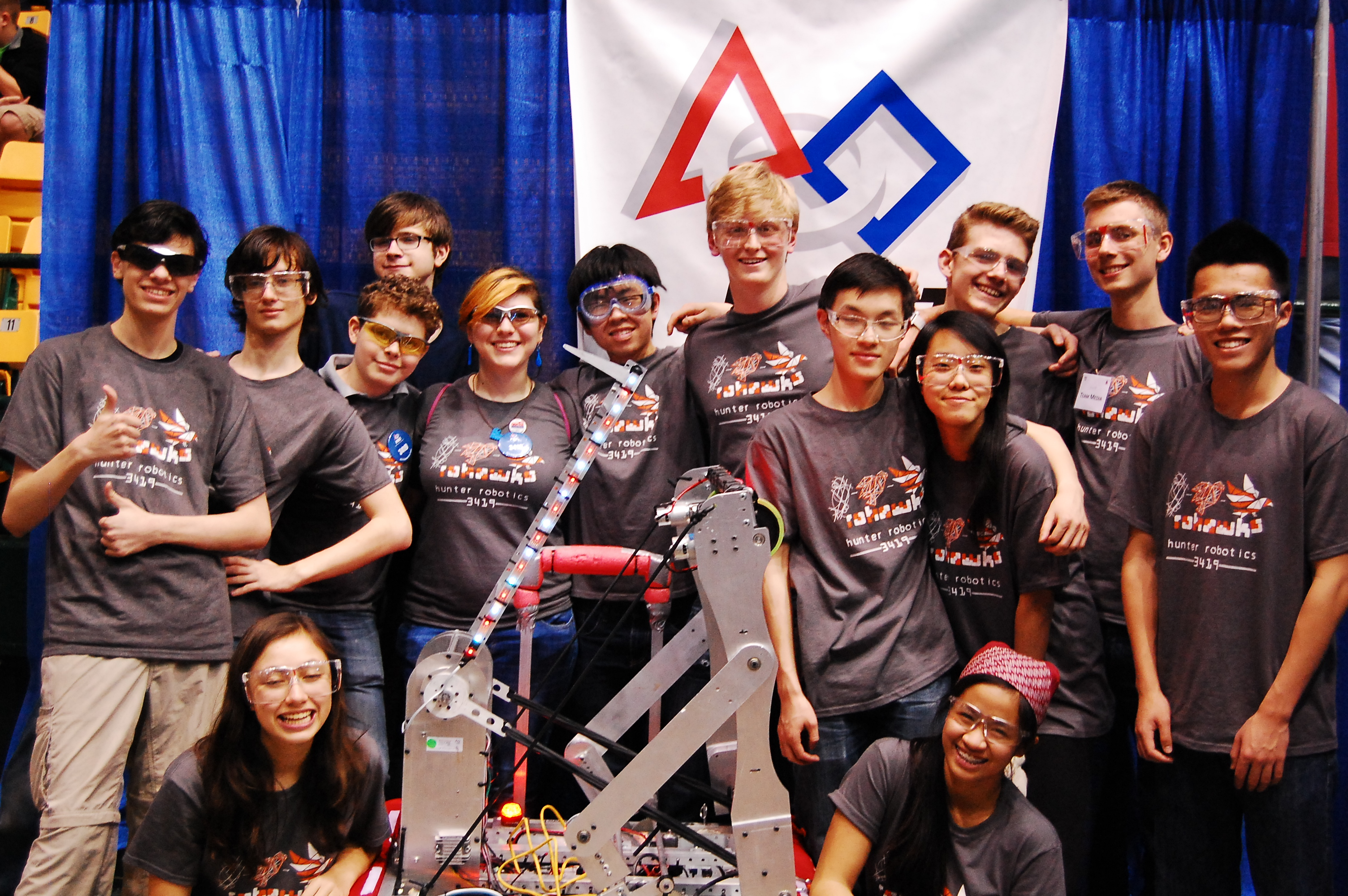
A New York City FIRST Robotics Team at a Greater DC Regional with their robot (Hunter College High School-3419)

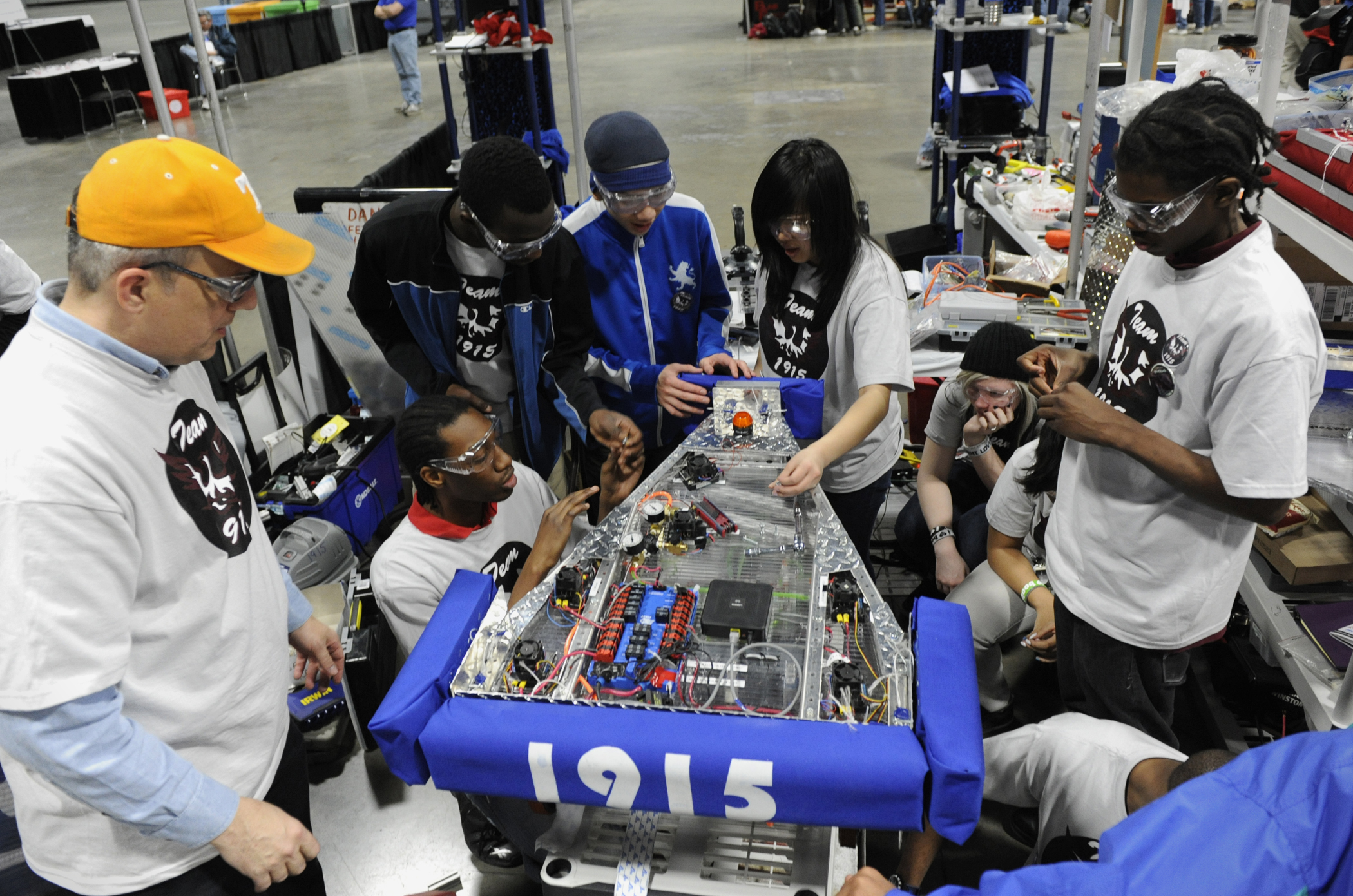
A reserve officer from the Office of Naval Research assisting students from McKinley Technology High School during a regional competition

In the 2024 Crescendo season, 3,468 teams from 28 countries competed, including 327 "rookie teams" in their first season of competition.

FIRST Robotics Competition Teams by Country (2025)
Country	Teams
United States	2,937
Canada	194
Turkiye	192
Mexico	87
Brazil	69
Israel	61
Australia	43
China	40
Taiwan	36
India	7
Japan	6
Dominican Republic	4
France	3
Panama	3
Czech Republic	2
Netherlands	2
South Africa	2
United Kingdom	1
Argentina	1
Azerbaijan	1
Belize	1
Bulgaria	1
Colombia	1
Croatia	1
Greece	1
Hungary	1
Philippines	1
Poland	1
Singapore	1
Switzerland	1
Total	3,468

== Competition ==
FIRST Robotics competition operates in two competition models determined by geographic location, District and Regional.

=== Districts ===
Teams competing in districts may attend two smaller events as part of their registration. Advancement from the district to FIRST Championship is dependent on participation in a District Championship event and the Championship slots allocated to each district. While regional teams may never compete in district events, district teams are permitted to compete in regional events but cannot qualify for the FIRST Championship from regional participation.

Districts are geographically defined areas and all teams within the area are part of the district.

FIRST Robotics Competition Districts
District	Regions	Country
Chesapeake	Maryland, Virginia, + Washington, D.C.	United States
Michigan	Michigan	United States
Indiana	Indiana	United States
Texas	Texas & New Mexico	United States
Mid-Atlantic	Delaware, New Jersey, & Eastern Pennsylvania	United States
North Carolina	North Carolina	United States
South Carolina	South Carolina	United States
New England	Connecticut, Massachusetts, Maine, New Hampshire, Rhode Island, & Vermont	United States
Peachtree	Georgia & South Carolina	United States
Pacific Northwest	Washington & Oregon	United States
California	California	United States
Wisconsin	Wisconsin	United States
Ontario	Ontario	Canada
Israel	Israel	Israel

=== Regionals ===
All teams not located inside a district are considered Regional Model Teams. Regional Model Teams are allocated one, generally large, regional event from registration. Advancement from regional events is direct to FIRST Championship on basis of achieving specific merit requirements.

=== FIRST Championship ===
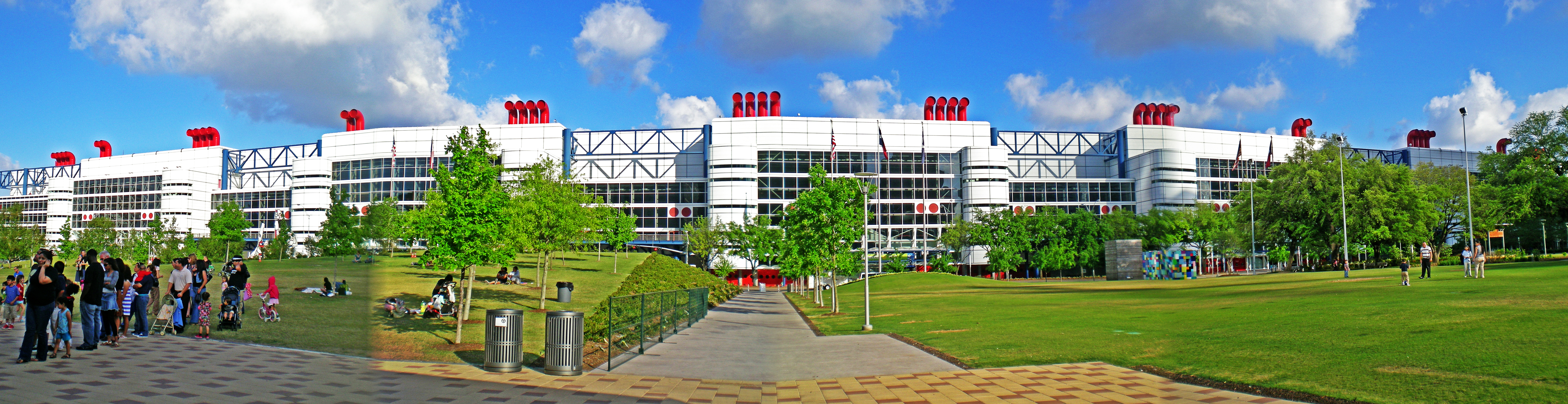
The FIRST Championship has been held at the George R. Brown Convention Center in Houston, Texas since 2017 and will continue to be held there through 2034.

The FIRST Championship is the culmination of the FRC season, and occurs in late April each year. As of 2025, about 600 teams compete in the FIRST Championship in Houston, Texas. In the past, as many as 800 teams participated in two separate Championships, such as in 2018 where it was held in Houston, Texas and Detroit, Michigan. After the 2022 championships concluded FIRST announced that the world championship would take place at a single location, Houston, Texas, for the 2023 and 2024 seasons. This was later updated through 2027, and then 2034.

In past years, there have been as many as 12 concurrent divisions at the FIRST Championship. As of 2025, FRC teams are divided into 8 divisions at the FIRST Championship:

- Archimedes
- Curie
- Daly
- Galileo
- Hopper
- Johnson
- Milstein
- Newton

The divisions operate in the model of independent events. The winning alliance from each division advances to Einstein Field for a final tournament. Despite being referenced as a single field, Einstein matches take place on two fields known as Mass and Energy which are re-used from the division fields. The teams of the winning alliance are given automatic advancement to FIRST Championship for the next season and the Impact award-winning team is given automatic advancement for the next 8 seasons.

=== Awards ===
At every competition, judges interview teams and give awards based on exemplary qualities. Some awards are based on the attributes of a robot, while some are based on the attributes of a team. Other awards require teams to submit additional content before they can be judged.

Awards given based on robot attributes:

- Autonomous Award
- Creativity Award
- Excellence in Engineering Award
- Industrial Design Award
- Innovation in Control
- Quality Award

Awards given based on team attributes:

- Engineering Inspiration Award
- Gracious Professionalism Award
- Imagery Award
- Judges Award
- Rising All-Star Award
- Rookie All-Star Award
- Team Spirit Award
- Team Sustainability Award

Submitted awards:

- FIRST Impact Award (formerly the Chairman's Award)
- FIRST Leadership Award (formerly the FIRST Dean's List Award)
- Woodie Flowers Award
- Digital Animation Award
- Safety Animation Award

Other awards:

- Winner, given to all the teams on the winning alliance
- Finalist, given to all the teams on the alliance that was eliminated in the finals
- Volunteer of the Year, given to a volunteer in the FIRST community

The Digital Animation Award and the Safety Animation Award are different in that they are not given at the competition. Instead, FIRST chooses the winner globally from every team that submitted an animation.

== Media exposure ==
The PBS documentary "Gearing Up" followed four teams through the 2008 season.

In the television series Dean of Invention, Dean Kamen made appeals promoting FIRST prior to commercial breaks.

In 2008, FRC Team 1114, Simbotics, was featured in an ongoing storyline on the hit Canadian TV drama "Degrassi: Next Generation". Team 1114's 2006-2007 world champion VEX robot made an appearance, as well as their 2008 world champion FRC robot.

During the 2010 FIRST Robotics Competition season, FIRST team 3132, Thunder Down Under, was followed by a Macquarie University student film crew to document the first year of FIRST Robotics Competition in Australia. The crew produced a documentary film called I, Wombot. The film premiered during the 2011 Dungog Film Festival.

A book called The New Cool was written by Neal Bascomb about the story of Team 1717 from Goleta, California as they competed in the 2009 game season.

The CNN documentary "Don't Fail Me: Education in America", which aired on May 15, 2011, followed three FRC teams during the 2011 season. The documentary profiled one student from each team, covering different geographic and socioeconomic levels: Shaan Patel from Team 1403 Cougar Robotics, Maria Castro from Team 842 Falcon Robotics, and Brian Whited from Team 3675 Eagletrons.

On August 14, 2011, ABC aired a special on FIRST called "i.am FIRST: Science is Rock and Roll" that featured many famous musical artists such as The Black Eyed Peas and Willow Smith. will.i.am himself was the executive producer of the special. The program placed a special focus on the FIRST Robotics competition, even though it included segments on the FIRST Tech Challenge, FIRST Lego League Challenge, and FIRST LEGO League Explore

From 1996 to 1998, the FIRST Championship was covered by ESPN.

For the 2013 Macy's Thanksgiving Day Parade, five FIRST Robotics Competition teams and their robots led the parade, with one robot cutting the ribbon and the others shooting confetti.

In the 2014 movie Transformers: Age of Extinction, a FIRST Robotics Competition Robot built by Team 2468, Team Appreciate, for the 2012 Season was featured in Cade Yeager's garage shooting the foam basketball game pieces from Rebound Rumble.

The 2015 Kickoff was, for the first time, broadcast by NBCUniversal, a subsidiary of Comcast, and was available via OnDemand for the month of January 2015.

In 2016, Christina Li, a member of Team 217, the ThunderChickens, was spotlighted on an episode of Nickelodeon's The Halo Effect entitled "Hello World". A coding camp that Li organized for young girls was featured on the episode, and 217's robot from the 2015 season made an appearance.

The fourth season of The Fosters (2013 TV series) had several episodes featuring characters competing in a regional FIRST Robotics Competition competition, most notably episode 8 "Girl Code".

In June 2018, HBO aired a Real Sports with Bryant Gumbel episode, which in a segment, the correspondent Soledad O'Brien interviewed Dean Kamen about FIRST and FIRST Robotics Competition and then later interviewed students from various FRC teams.

The February 25, 2020 episode of the ABC sitcom Black-ish features recurring character, Jack Johnson, joining a FIRST team—and a cameo by Dean Kamen.

Episode 6 in the second season of the Netflix original series Trinkets featured a FIRST Robotics Competition competition.

On March 18, 2022, Disney+ released a documentary directed by Gillian Jacobs titled "More than Robots", which follows four teams in the 2020 season, leading up to the COVID-19 pandemic.

The 2025 film Five Nights at Freddy's 2 featured First Robotics Competition Team 3039, Wildcat Robotics, in a scene in a robotics classroom, which included their 2020 and 2024 robots, among others.

== Notable people ==
=== Alumni ===
- Priscilla Chan (Team 69)
- Leanne Cushing
- Emma Dumont (Team 980)
- Imraan Faruque
- Dylan Field (Team 675)
- Amanda Randles

=== Employees and volunteers ===
- Joseph Bouchard
- Imogen Coe
- Michael Dubno
- Amber Gell
- Marc Hodosh, entrepreneur, chairman of the Boston FIRST Robotics Competition competition
- Mark Leon, NASA researcher and Master of Ceremonies for several FIRST Robotics Competition events
- David Siegel

=== Mentors ===
- Amir Abo-Shaeer (Team 1717), teacher and engineer, subject of The New Cool
- Emma Dumont (Team 680)
- Maor Farid
- Patrick Freivald (Team 1551)
- Grant Imahara (Team 841), engineer and roboticist, former cast member of MythBusters
- Dave Lavery (Team 116), NASA scientist and former member of the FIRST Robotics Competition Game Design Committee
- Nic Radford (Team 118)
- Nancy Yasecko (Team 233)

== Games ==
Year	Theme	Number of participants	Number of teams	Number of official events
1992	Maize Craze		28	
1993	Rug Rage		25	
1994	Tower Power		43	
1995	Ramp 'n Roll		59	
1996	Hexagon Havoc		94	
1997	Toroid Terror		151	
1998	Ladder Logic		199	
1999	Double Trouble		271	
2000	Co-Opertition FIRST		372	
2001	Diabolical Dynamics		515	
2002	Zone Zeal		642	
2003	Stack Attack		787	
2004	FIRST Frenzy: Raising the Bar		927	
2005	Triple Play	25,000	991	
2006	Aim High		1,133	33
2007	Rack 'n Roll	32,675	1,307	37
2008	FIRST Overdrive	38,000 (est.)	1,501	42
2009	Lunacy	42,000+	1,683	49
2010	Breakaway	45,000+	1,808	53
2011	Logo Motion	51,000+	2,072	59
2012	Rebound Rumble	59,000+	2,343	70
2013	Ultimate Ascent	63,000+	2,546	78
2014	Aerial Assist	68,000	2,727	99
2015	Recycle Rush	72,500 (est.)	2,900	110
2016	FIRST Stronghold	78,500	3,140	127
2017	FIRST Steamworks	84,000	3,357	146
2018	FIRST Power Up	91,500	3,660	160
2019	Destination: Deep Space	95,050	3,802	175
2020	Infinite Recharge	97,850	3,914	52 (Note: 130 events and both championships cancelled.)
2021	Infinite Recharge (2021)	52,340	3,079	0 (Note: No official events due to the COVID-19 pandemic .)
2022	Rapid React	70,800+	3,225	159
2023	Charged Up	83,600+	3,304	167
2024	Crescendo	87,000+	3,468	172
2025	Reefscape (FIRST DIVE)	92,525+ youth	3,731	185
2026	Rebuilt (FIRST AGE)			
2027	BioCore (FIRST CANOPY)			

== Gallery ==
FIRST Robotics Competition
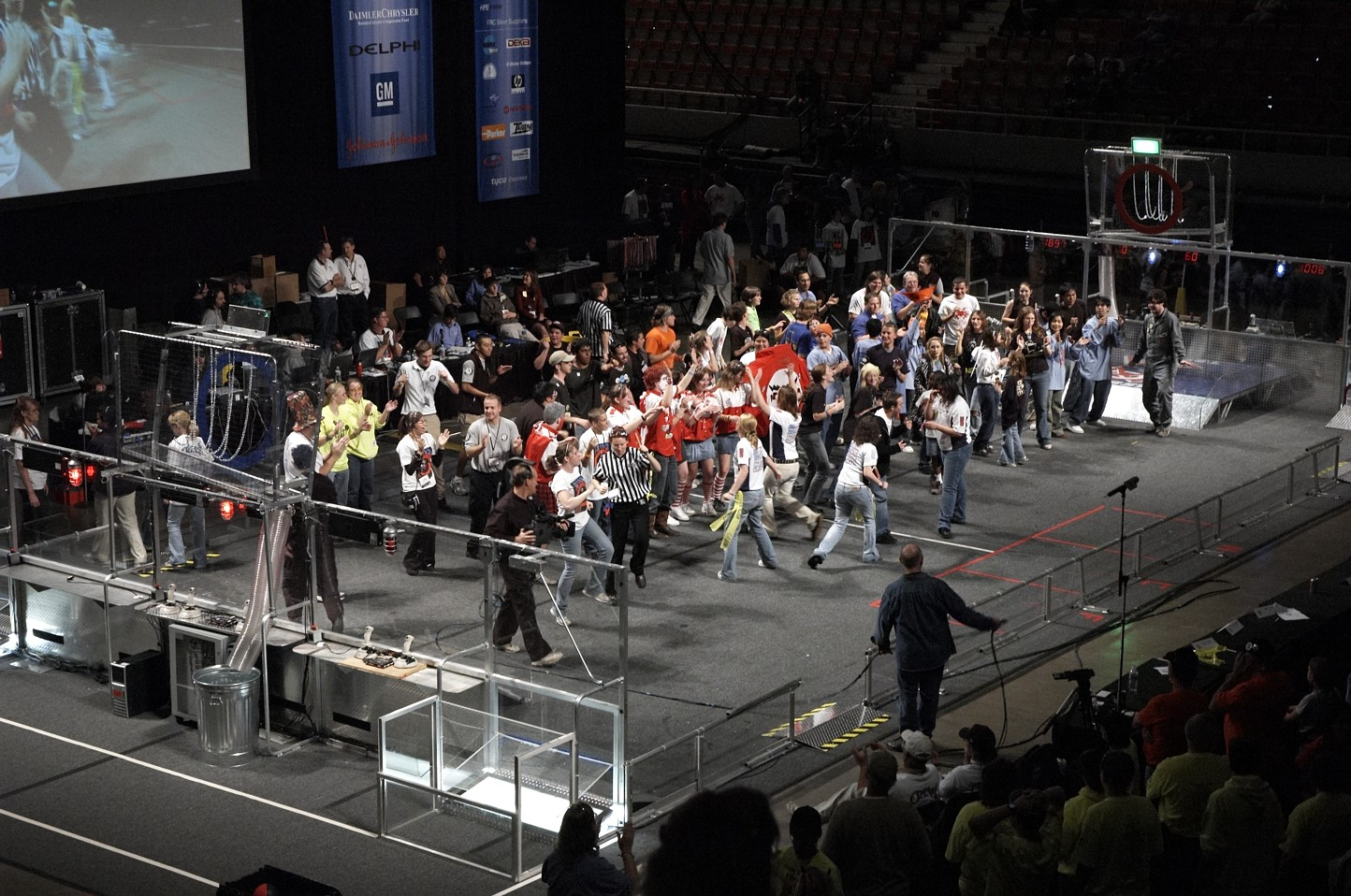
Intermission during Aim High in Los Angeles, encouraging teams to socialize

The 2006 Triplets of 1114, 1503, and 1680. 1114 and 1503 won 3 regionals each, while 1680 won a silver finalist medal and was a quarterfinalist twice.

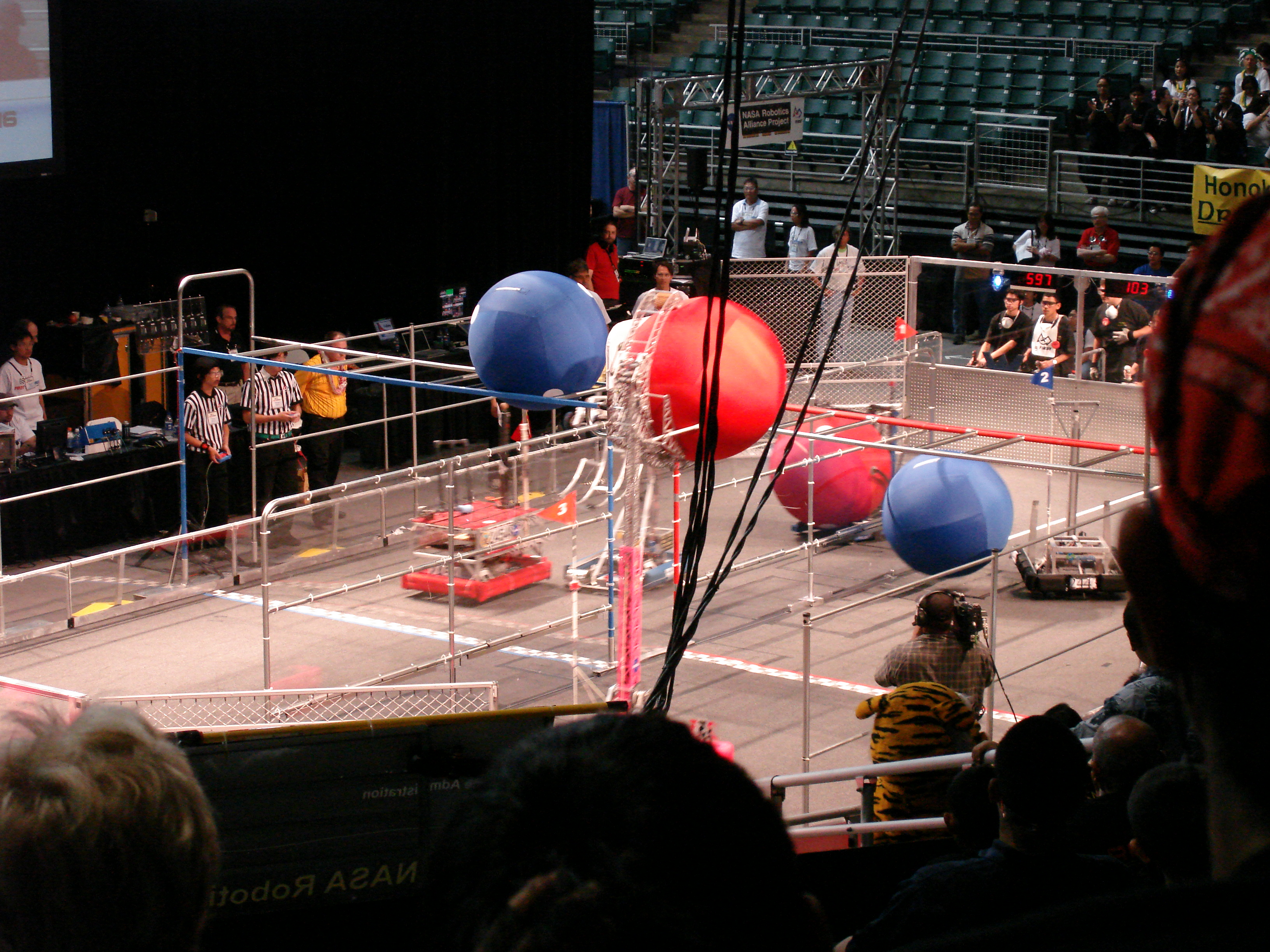
Competition at the 2008 Hawaii regional.

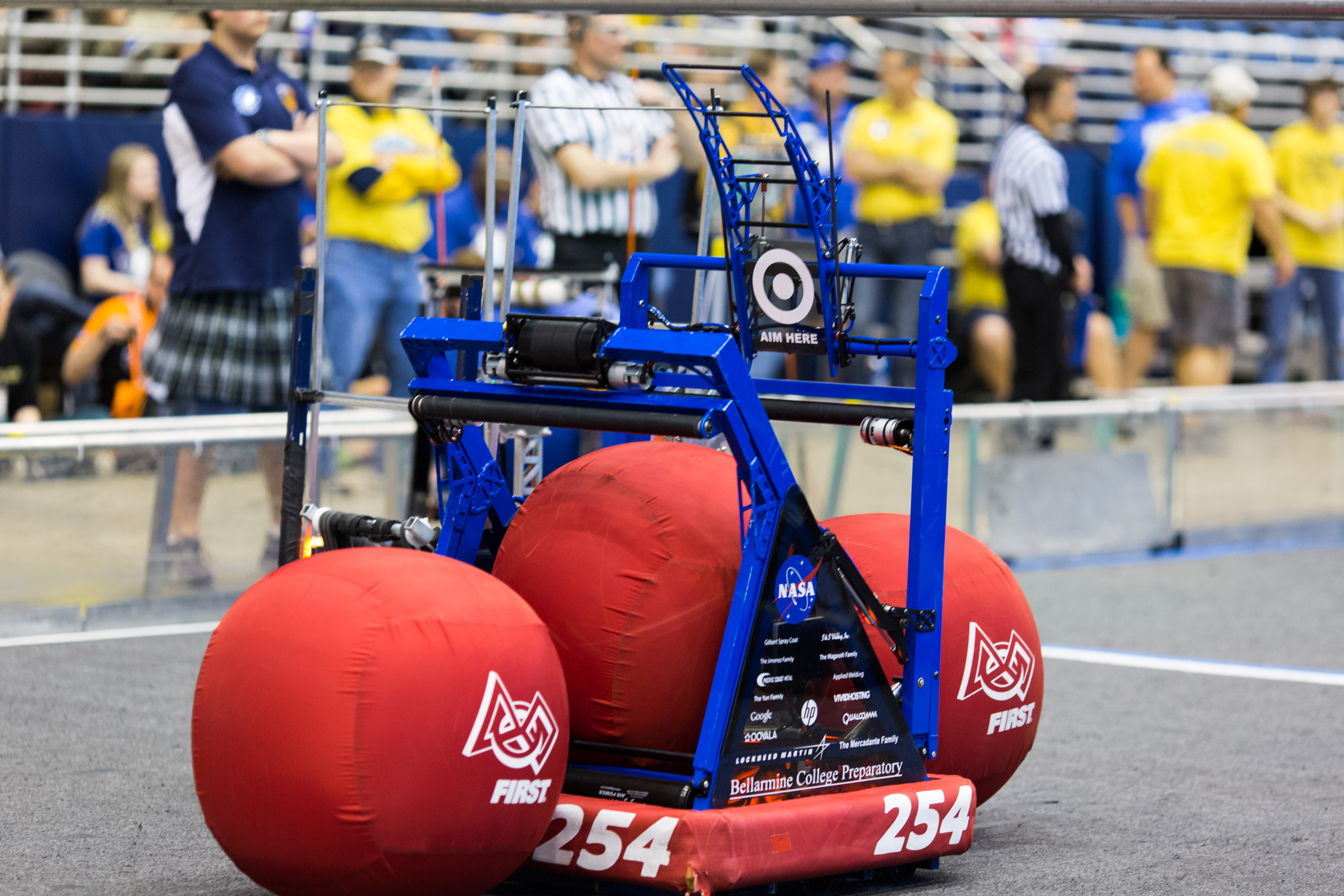
"Barrage", Team 254's 2014 World Champion FRC robot

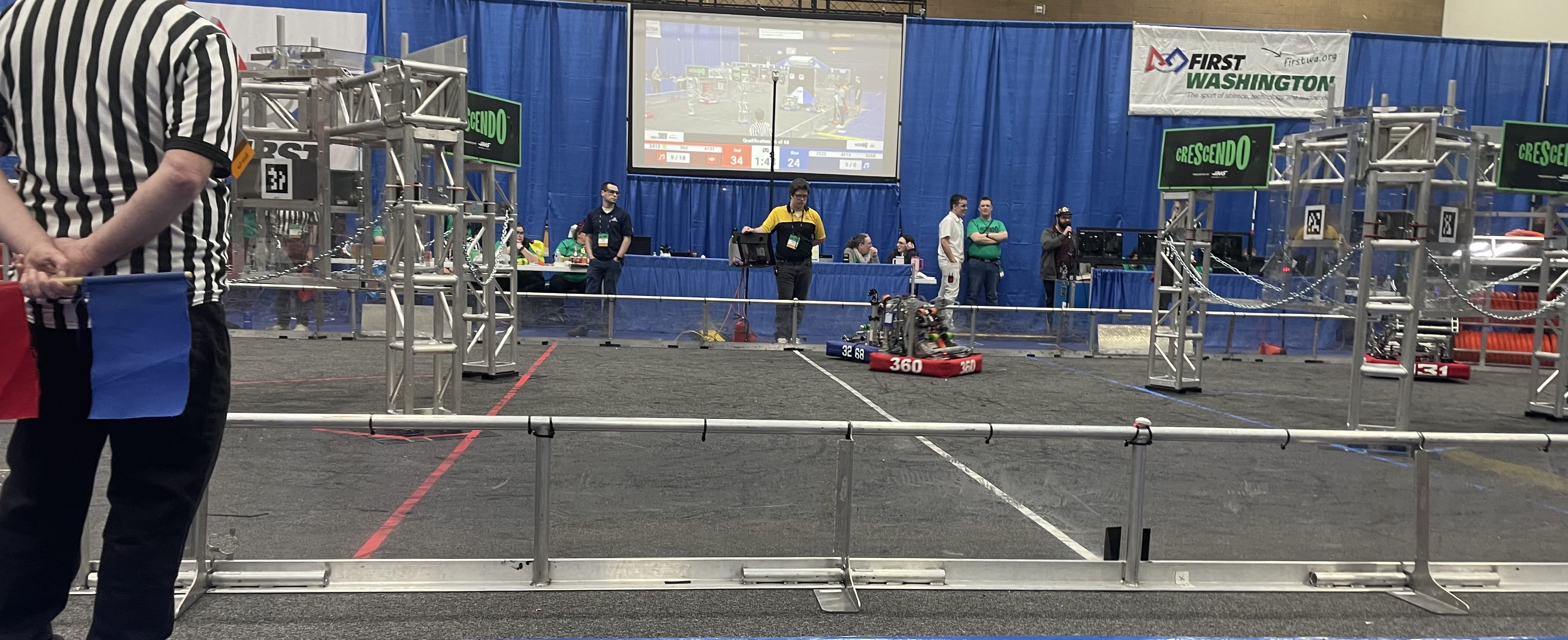
The playing field in 2024 at the PNW Glacier Peak event

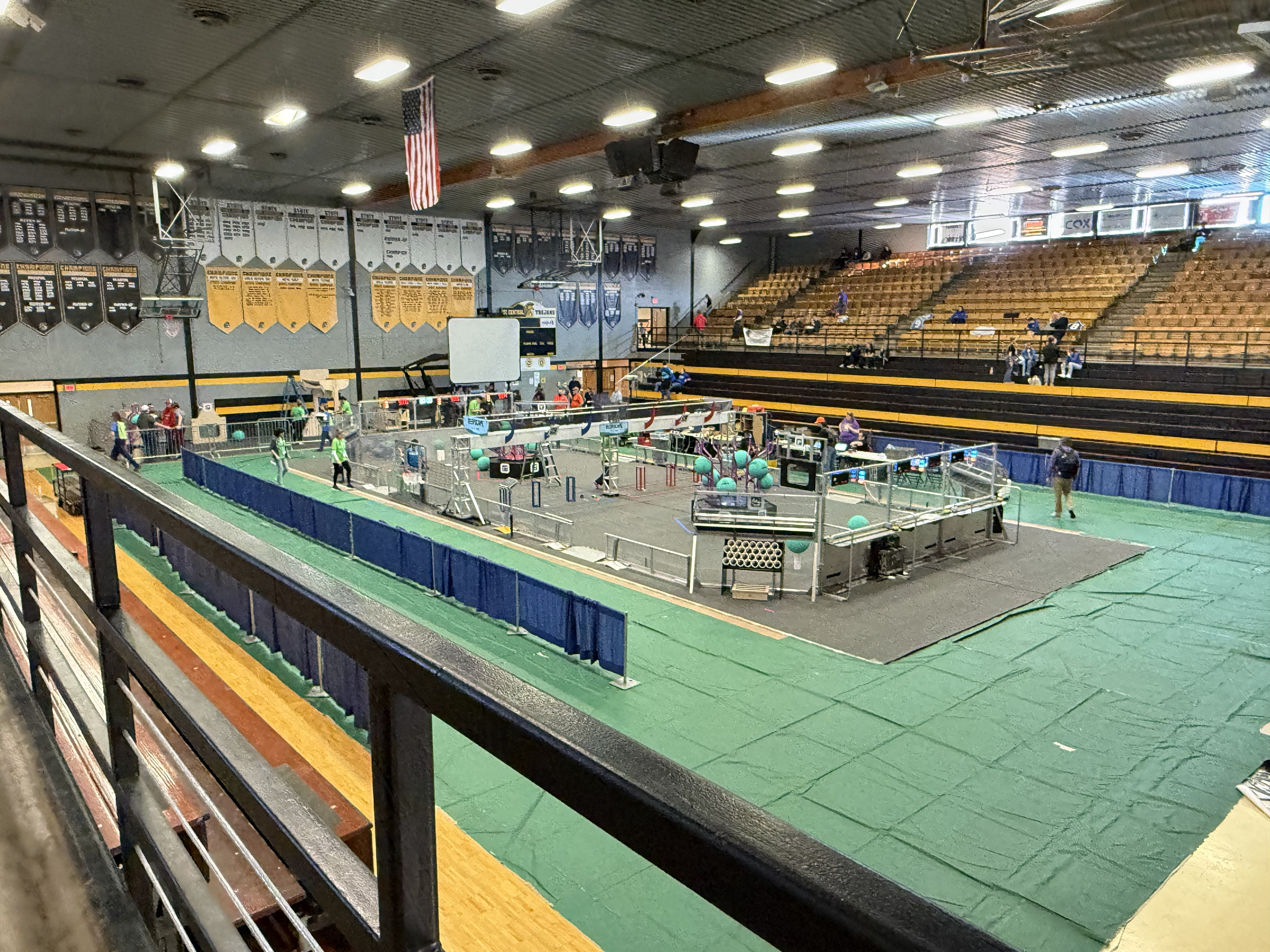
Playing field in 2025 at the FIM Traverse City event

== Sources ==
- Michigan robotics champs off to world finals in St. Louis- Detroit Free Press
- FIRST Robotics Competition's 2011 Regional Season Is Worth a Look - PCWorld
