= Toroid Terror =

1997 FIRST Robotics Competition game

- Year: 1997

Season Information
- Number of teams: 151
- Number of regionals: 3
- Championship location: Epcot Center, Disney World

FIRST Championship Awards
- Chairman's Award winner: Team 47 - “Chief Delphi”
- Woodie Flowers Award winner: Elizabeth Calef - Team 88
- Founder's Award winner: François Castaing & Chrysler Corporation
- Champions: Team 71 - "Team Hammond"

Toroid Terror was the 1997 game for the FIRST Robotics Competition. This was the first year that FRC had a regional event outside its origins in New Hampshire; in addition to Manchester, regionals were held in Chicago and New Brunswick, New Jersey, as well as the championship event at a complex set up in the Epcot parking lot. It was also the first year in which the scoring object was not a ball.

== Field ==
The playing field is a carpeted, hexagon-shaped area with a central goal. Around the perimeter of the field are three stations for human players, who work with remote controlled robots on the field to score points. At the start of each match, each team has 3 colored inner tubes at their player station and six tubes on the field, located in stacks distributed evenly around the goal.

== Robots ==
Each robot can weigh up to 120 lb (54 kg), and must start each match small enough to fit inside a 3' x 3' x 4' space. This had the disadvantage that robots couldn't fit through a standard doorway, and there were rumors of robots being assembled in a room, and when they tried to take it out to ship, it wouldn't fit through a door. The robots are powered by two Skil 12 volt rechargeable batteries and use motors from Skil, Delco, and Delphi Interior and Lighting, speed controllers from Tekin, pumps from McCord Winn Textron, air cylinders and valves from Numatics, Inc., and a programmable control system supplied by FIRST. Drivers use joysticks from CH Products and switches from Honeywell to remotely control the robots via a radio link which uses RNet wireless modems from Motorola.

== Scoring ==
Toroid Terror scoring structure

In two-minute matches, the three robots and human players score points by placing the inner tubes onto pegs on the goal, or around the top of the goal. The tubes are color-coded to identify team ownership. Human players are not allowed onto the field, but they may hand tubes to the robots or throw tubes directly onto the goal. At the end of the match, each tube on the goal is worth one point. Each tube on the top of the goal will double a team's score. In addition, each vertical row of three tubes on a corner of the goal will double a team's score. The winner of the match is the team with the highest score. In the event of a tie, the team with the highest tube in a scoring position wins.
