= Triple Play (FIRST) =

2005 FIRST Robotics Competition game

- Year: 2005

Season Information
- Number of teams: 991
- Number of regionals: 30; 1 pilot
- Championship location: Georgia Dome, Atlanta, Georgia

FIRST Championship Awards
- Chairman's Award winner: Team 67 - "The HOT Team"
- Woodie Flowers Award winner: Paul Copioli
- Founder's Award winner: Lego Group
- Champions: Team 330 - "The Beach Bots"; Team 67 - "The HOT Team"; Team 503 - "Frog Force"

Triple Play was the name of the 2005 season FIRST Robotics Competition game.

== Events ==
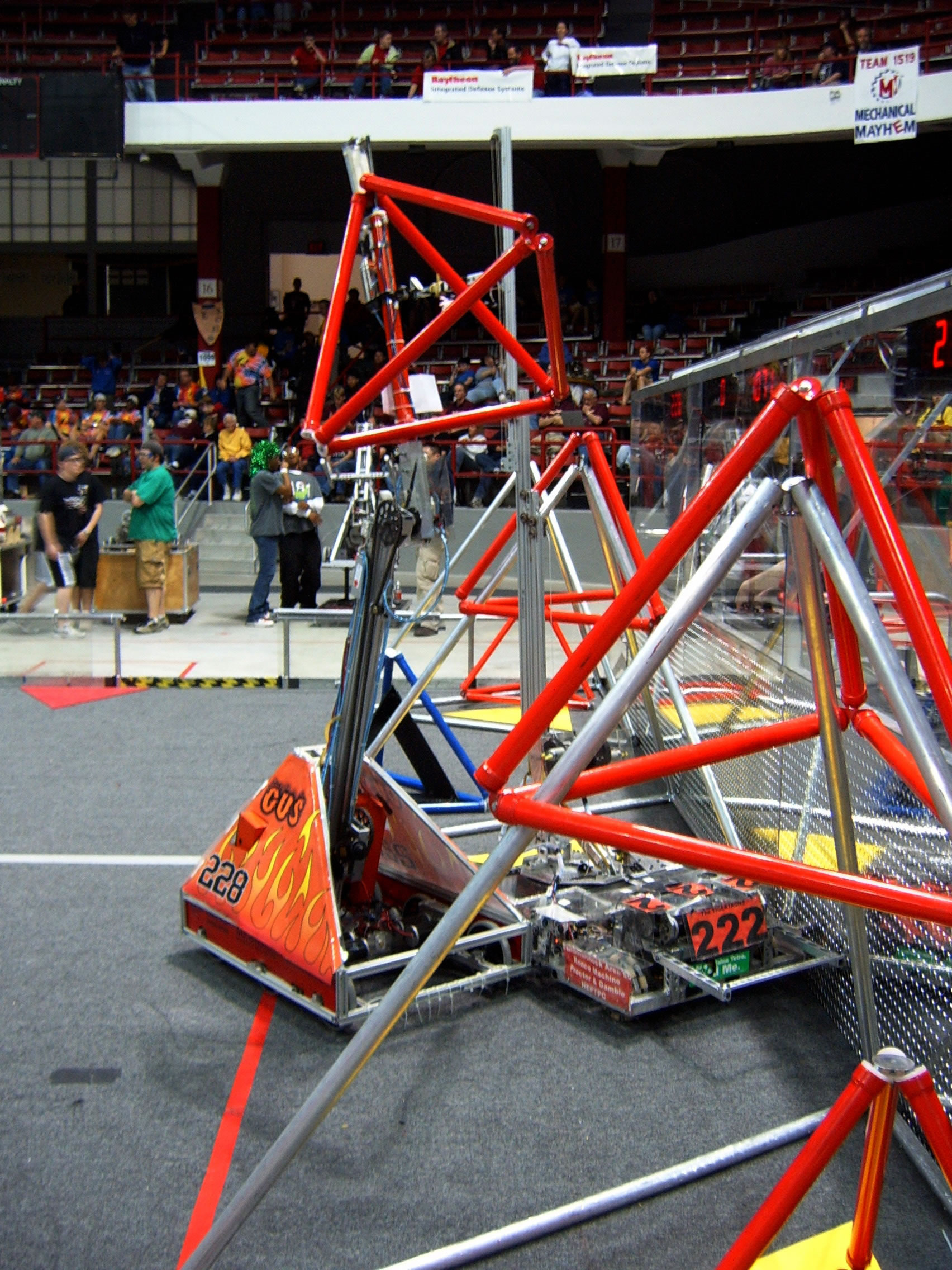
Team 228 scoring a tetra

The following regional events were held in 2005:

- Arizona Regional - Phoenix
- BAE Systems Granite State Regional - Manchester, NH
- Boilermaker Regional - West Lafayette, IN
- Buckeye Regional - Cleveland, OH
- Chesapeake Regional - Annapolis, MD
- Colorado Regional - Denver
- Detroit Regional - Detroit
- Finger Lakes Regional - Rochester, NY
- Florida Regional - Orlando
- GM/Technion University Israel Pilot Regional - Haifa, Israel (pilot)
- Great Lakes Regional - Ypsilanti, MI
- Greater Toronto Regional - Mississauga, ON
- Las Vegas Regional - Las Vegas
- Lone Star Regional - Houston
- Midwest Regional - Chicago
- NASA/VCU Regional - Richmond, VA
- New Jersey Regional - Trenton, NJ
- New York City Regional - New York City
- Pacific Northwest Regional - Portland
- Palmetto Regional - Columbia, SC
- Peachtree Regional - Duluth, GA
- Philadelphia Regional - Philadelphia
- Pittsburgh Regional - Pittsburgh
- St. Louis Regional - St. Charles, MO
- Sacramento Regional - Davis, CA
- SBPLI Long Island Regional - Hempstead, NY
- Silicon Valley Regional - San Jose, CA
- Southern California Regional - Los Angeles
- UTC New England Regional - Hartford, CT
- Waterloo Regional - Waterloo, ON
- West Michigan Regional - Allendale, MI

The championship was held in the Georgia Dome, Atlanta.
