= Tower Power =

1994 FIRST Robotics Competition game

- Year: 1994
- Number of teams: 43
- Championship location: Nashua High School

FIRST Championship Awards
- Chairman's Award winner: Team 191 - "X-Cats”
- Champions: Team 144 - Walnut Hills High School - Cincinnati, OH

Tower Power was the 1994 game for the FIRST Robotics Competition.

== Field ==
Tower Power field and robots

The Playing Field was a carpeted regular dodecagon which measured 34 ft (10 m) across. The surface consists of a closed loop, low piled carpet. The perimeter of the field was defined by four-by-four boards. At the beginning of a match, there were 36 soccer balls (12 of each color: red, white or blue) arranged into 6 piles of 6 identical balls each. Each team was assigned a color and must collect only balls of their color during the game.

== Robots ==
Each robot had to weigh no more than 65 lb (29 kg) and fit, unconstrained, inside a 36 in (914 mm) cylinder that was 30 in (762 mm) tall. The robots used six motors which were powered by a MAW 23 volt battery.

== Scoring ==
In each match, the three teams competed to place the 12 balls of their team color inside either the high goal, worth 3 points per ball, or the low goal, worth one point per ball. The winner was the team that had the highest total point value of soccer balls within the two goals at the end of the 2 minute match. In the case of a tie, the team with more balls in the upper goal won.
