= Infinite Recharge =

2020 FIRST Robotics Competition game

- Year: 2020

Season Information
- Number of teams: 3,898
- Number of regionals: 17 played, 49 cancelled
- Number of district events: 35 played, 81 cancelled
- Championship location: Both championships cancelled

FIRST Championship Awards
- Chairman's Award winner: None (championships cancelled)
- Woodie Flowers Award winner: Lucien Junkin - Team 118
- Founder's Award winner: FIRST Community
- Champions: None (championships cancelled)

Links
- Website: Official website

Infinite Recharge (stylized in all caps) is the FIRST Robotics Competition (FRC) game for the 2020 season. The season is in partnership with Lucasfilm as part of its Star Wars: Force for Change initiative.

The Infinite Recharge game involves two alliances of three teams each, with each team controlling a robot and performing specific tasks on a field to score points. The game centers around a futuristic city theme involving two alliances consisting of three teams each competing to perform various tasks, including shooting foam balls known as Power Cells into high and low goals to activate a Shield Generator, manipulating a Control Panel to activate this shield, and returning to the Shield Generator to park or climb at the end of the match. The objective is to energize and activate the shield before the match ends and asteroids strike FIRST City, a futuristic city modeled after Star Wars.

The 2020 season was the first season without an enforced six-week build period, with teams able to work on their robot at any time after kickoff. However, teams are in general not permitted to work on their robot outside of pit hours during an event the team in question is competing at.

The 2020 season was suspended on March 12, 2020, and all remaining events were cancelled on May 13, due to the COVID-19 pandemic. On the same day, it was announced that Infinite Recharge would also be played in 2021, with possible "changes" to be revealed at that season's kickoff.

== Kickoff ==
The season's kickoff event took place on January 4, 2020, at 10:00 AM Eastern Time and was centered around an impending asteroid impact threatening the FIRST City. The event was broadcast from Manchester, New Hampshire over Twitch.

== Field ==
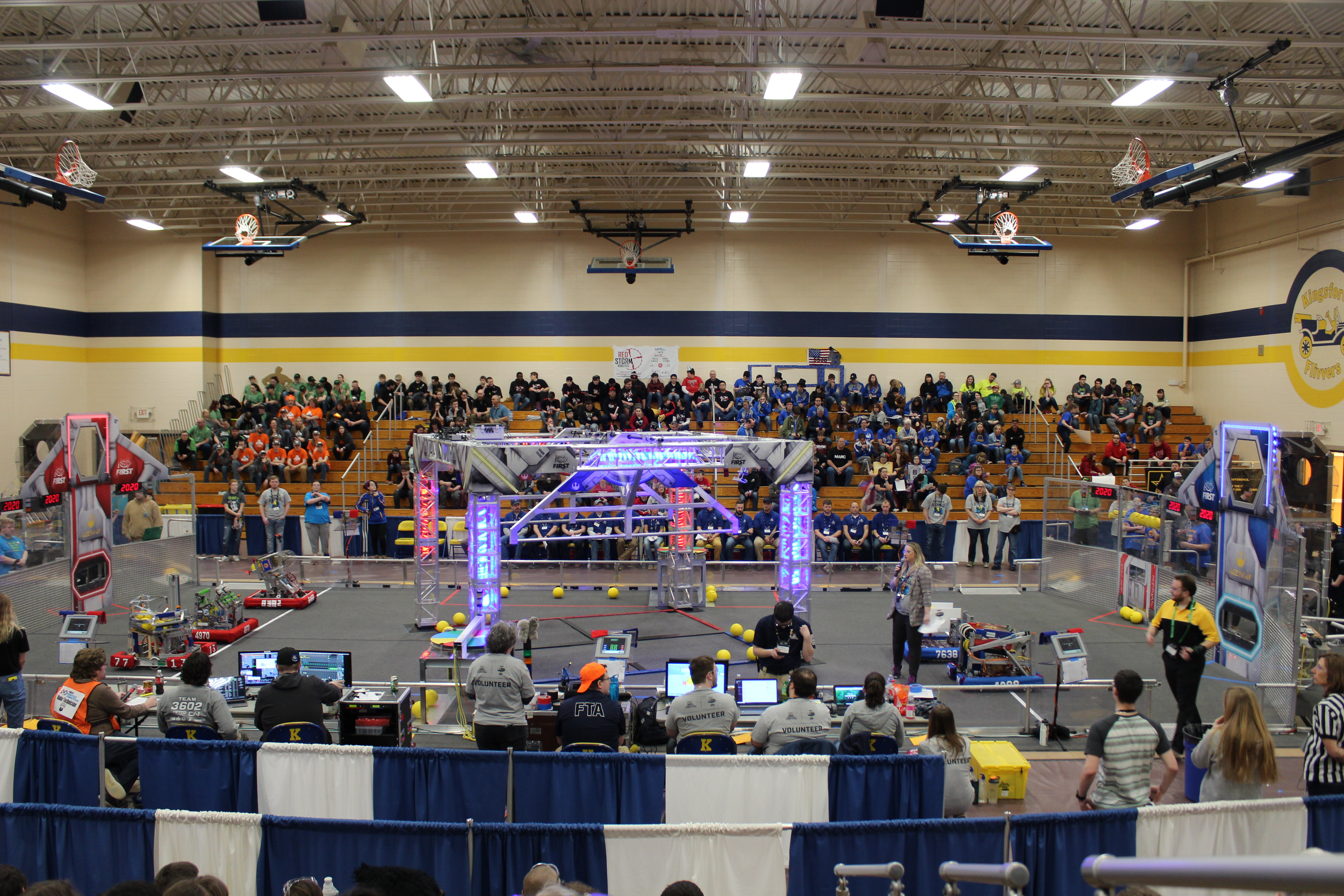
The Infinite Recharge playing field

Infinite Recharge is played on a 26 ft 11 1/4 in (~821 cm) by 52 ft 5 1/4 in(~1598 cm) field covered in grey low-pile carpet. The field is bounded by short transparent polycarbonate guardrails on the longer sides and the taller Alliance Station walls on the shorter side. The field features two sectors, with each containing one end for each alliance combined with the rendezvous point (center area). The sector contains robots at the start of each match, while drivers control their robots at the alliance station. The rendezvous point contains the Shield Generator and the Trenches.

=== Alliance Station ===
Each team has their own Alliance Station that is positioned at one of the ends of the field. The Alliance Station is where drivers control their robots, human players deliver game pieces to robots, and opposing alliance robots shoot game pieces. Alliance Stations contain three driver's stations, one for each participating team in the alliance. The center player station is flanked on one side by the loading bay, and on the other side by the opposing alliance's power port.

=== Loading Bay ===
Loading Bays are located in the alliance stations, with one per alliance. The Loading Bays are used by the human player to give game pieces to the robots on the field. There are five places that game pieces can be put into the Loading Bay, with two upper ports, and three ground ports.

=== Power Cell ===
Power Cells are the main game piece in Infinite Recharge. The Power Cell is a yellow, 7 in (~18 cm) diameter Medium Bounce Dino-Skin foam ball. The FIRST logo is printed in black ink on each Power Cell.

=== Shield Generator ===
The Shield Generator is a large box-shaped structure located in the center of the field. It contains both alliances Rendezvous Points, as well as the two Generator Switches.

=== Trench Run ===
The Trench Run is an approximately 4 ft by 18 ft rectangular area on each side of the field bounded by alliance-colored tape that contains the alliance's Control Panel. It is located in the middle of the field, directly adjacent to the Shield Generator.

=== Scoring Areas ===
==== Power Port ====
There are two Power Ports on the field, with one at each Alliance Station. An alliance's Power Port is located at the opposing alliance's Alliance Station, requiring robots that intake from the Loading Bays to drive across the field in order to score Power Cells. There are three levels of scoring on a Power Port. The rectangular Bottom Port is worth two points in autonomous, or one in the teleoperated (or teleop) period. The hexagonal Outer Port is located above the Bottom Port, and is worth four points during the autonomous period, and two points in teleop. The Inner Port is located inside of the Outer Port, and is a much smaller circular hole set in the back of the Outer Port. It is worth six points in autonomous, and three during teleop.

Scoring Power Cells into the Power Port also contributes towards reaching Capacity, which is a count of the number of power cells scored, regardless of port. Certain levels of Capacity require additional tasks to be completed. Lights around the Power Cell indicate progression towards reaching a stage's Capacity, lighting up in a chase pattern when Capacity is reached but the extra condition is yet to be fulfilled. Upon reaching Capacity and completing the stage's additional task, the stage is said to be Activated.

The following table describes how the three Shield Generator Activation thresholds are reached.
Stage	Power Cell Capacity	Additional Conditions	Activating Grants
1	9	The teleoperated phase must have begun.	Unlocks Rotation Control.
2	20	Rotation Control must be complete.	Unlocks Position Control.
3	20	Position Control must be complete.	One Ranking Point.

==== Control Panel ====
There are two Control Panels placed on either side of the middle of the field, in each alliance's Trench. They are large discs, with eight colored wedges (red, yellow, blue, and green, repeated once) printed on both the top and bottom. There is a glass panel on the bottom of the Control Panel, however, its wedges are still visible from underneath. After activating Stage 1 and reaching Stage 2's capacity, an alliance may score 10 points by performing Rotation Control on the Control Panel. This entails spinning the Control Panel at least 3 times, but not more than 5. Rotating past a fifth rotation resets this task, and the rotations must be completed again. After activating Stage 2 and reaching Stage 3's capacity, the alliance may score 20 points by performing Position Control. This entails rotating the Control Panel to a certain color specified by the Field Management System through a message sent to each team's driver's station. When complete, this energizes the Shield Generator, gaining the alliance one ranking point.

==== Rendezvous Point ====
An alliance's Rendezvous Point is located underneath the Shield generator, and is marked with each alliance's color on three sides, with the fourth side being a black line separating the two Rendezvous Points. Alliances gain 5 points for each robot parked there when the game ends or 25 for each robot hanging, which will be explained below.

==== Generator Switch ====
A Generator Switch is located above each alliance's Rendezvous Point, and is attached to the Shield Generator. During the final 30 seconds of a match, robots may extend up and attach to the bar on the bottom of the switch. Each robot attached to the switch and off the ground at the end of the match is worth 25 extra points. The switch is able to swing back and forth when robots attach to it, and there is an additional 15-point bonus for balancing the switch within ~8 degrees of level. An additional ranking point will also be given to an alliance if their endgame score (i.e., that of climbing and parking) is 65 points or more, which makes the Shield Generator operational.

==== Scoring Summary ====
Action	Autonomous	Teleop	Ranking Points (in Qualification)
Initiation Line Cross	5 points		
Power Cells in Bottom Port	2 points	1 point	
Power Cells in Outer Port	4 points	2 points	
Power Cells in Inner Port	6 points	3 points	
Control Panel Rotation Control		10 points	
Control Panel Position Control		20 points	
Hang on Shield Generator		25 Points	
Park below Shield Generator		5 Points	
Generator Switch Level		15 Points	
Shield Generator Operational			1 RP
Shield Generator Energized			1 RP
Foul	3 points to opposing alliance	3 points to opposing alliance	
Tech Foul	15 points to opposing alliance	15 points to opposing alliance	
Win			2 RP
Tie			1 RP

In qualification rounds, teams are ranked by their Ranking Score, or their average number of Ranking Points (RP) per match. To ensure high placement, it is not only important to win matches, but to complete the secondary objectives as well, to amass as many Ranking Points as possible.

== Events ==
The competition season for Infinite Recharge was planned to be divided into seven weeks, with many events occurring simultaneously during each week. After Week 7, teams that had qualified were scheduled to compete in the FIRST Championship, held over two weeks in Houston and Detroit. However, due to the coronavirus pandemic, a majority of these events including both championships were eventually cancelled. As a result, the final season covered only three weeks.

=== Week 1 ===
Event	Location	Date
Israel District 1	Haifa, Israel	February 24–25
Israel District 2	Haifa, Israel	February 26–27
Palmetto	Myrtle Beach, South Carolina	February 26 – 29
Miami Valley	Dayton, Ohio	February 26 – 29
Great Northern	Grand Forks, North Dakota	February 26 – 29
Monterrey	Monterrey, Nuevo León	February 26 – 29
Kettering University	Flint, Michigan	February 27 – 29
Southfield	Southfield, Michigan	February 27 – 29
Traverse City	Traverse City, Michigan	February 27 – 29
Granite State	Salem, New Hampshire	February 27 – 29
Clackamas Academy	Oregon City, Oregon	February 27 – 29
Greater Kansas City	Lee's Summit, Missouri	February 27 – March 1
Los Angeles North	Thousand Oaks, California	February 27 – March 1
Northern CT	Woodstock, Connecticut	February 28 – March 1
Gainesville	Gainesville, Georgia	February 28 – March 1
Wake County	Holly Springs, North Carolina	February 28 – March 1
Durham College	Oshawa, Ontario	February 28 – March 1
Hatboro-Horsham	Horsham, Pennsylvania	February 28 – March 1
Haymarket VA	Haymarket, Virginia	February 28 – March 1
Dripping Springs	Dripping Springs, Texas	February 28 – March 1
Greenville	Greenville, Texas	February 28 – March 1
Glacier Peak	Snohomish, Washington	February 28 – March 1

=== Week 2 ===
Event	Location	Date
Festival de Robotique	Sherbrooke, Quebec	March 4 – 7
Arkansas	Little Rock, Arkansas	March 4 – 7
Midwest	Chicago, Illinois	March 4 – 7
Lake Superior	Duluth, Minnesota	March 4 – 7
Northern Lights	Duluth, Minnesota	March 4 – 7
Utah	West Valley City, Utah	March 4 – 7
Canadian Pacific	Victoria, British Columbia	March 4 – 7
Dalton	Dalton, Georgia	March 5–7
Jackson	Spring Arbor, Michigan	March 5–7
Kettering University	Flint, Michigan	March 5–7
Milford	Highland, Michigan	March 5–7
St. Joseph	St. Joseph, Michigan	March 5–7
Kingsford	Kingsford, Michigan	March 5–7
West Valley	Spokane Valley, Washington	March 5–7
Istanbul	Istanbul, Turkey	March 5 – 8
Del Mar	Del Mar, California	March 5 – 8
Los Angeles	El Segundo, California	March 5 – 8
Waterbury	Waterbury, Connecticut	March 6–8
Bloomington	Bloomington, Indiana	March 6–8
SE Mass	Bridgewater, Massachusetts	March 6–8
Bethesda	Bethesda, Maryland	March 6–8
UNC Pembroke	Pembroke, North Carolina	March 6–8
Georgian College	Barrie, Ontario	March 6–8
Humber College	Toronto, Ontario	March 6–8
Richmond	Richmond, Virginia	March 6–8
Channelview	Channelview, Texas	March 6–8
Del Rio	Del Rio, Texas	March 6–8
Plano	Plano, Texas	March 6–8

=== Week 3 ===
Event	Location	Date
Bosphorus	Istanbul, Turkey	March 9–11

=== Postponed and Cancelled Events ===
On January 30, 2020, FIRST announced that the two Beijing Cultural Exchange regional events that were scheduled for Weeks 3 and 4 would be postponed until after the FIRST Championship due to the COVID-19 pandemic. As teams will not have an opportunity to qualify for the 2020 Championship through these events, teams that win Championship-qualifying awards at these two events will qualify for the 2021 Championship instead.

The Taichung Science Park regional, scheduled for Week 2, was postponed for the same reason.

On March 5, FIRST Washington announced that the Auburn Mountainview district event, scheduled for Week 2, was cancelled due to the coronavirus. This was the first event cancellation or postponement in the United States as a result of the outbreak.

On March 6, the Central New York regional, scheduled for Week 4, was postponed due to the coronavirus. The Mount Olive district event, scheduled for Week 2, was cancelled for the same reason.

On March 8, both Australian regionals were postponed due to the coronavirus. All FIRST in Michigan district events after Week 3 were also postponed.

At 10 AM on March 12, the Finger Lakes regional was cancelled due to the coronavirus following an announcement from the Monroe County health department, which restricted events over a size of 50 persons. The FIRST Chesapeake district also cancelled all remaining events, and rescheduled their district championship to June 17–20. Additionally, FIRST Mid-Atlantic has postponed all of its remaining events, including the district championship.

On March 12, 2020, FIRST announced that the 2020 season was suspended effective immediately. It was also announced that both FIRST Championship events would be cancelled.

On May 13, all suspended events were cancelled by FIRST. Additionally, it was announced that Infinite Recharge will be replayed in 2021 "with adjustments".

==== Events Postponed or Cancelled Before March 12 ====
Event	Week	Location
Taichung Science Park	2	Taichung, Taiwan
Mount Olive	2	Mount Olive, New Jersey
Beijing Cultural Exchange #1	3	Beijing, China
New York Tech Valley	3	Troy, New York
Southern Cross	3	Sydney Olympic Park, Australia
Arizona North	3	Flagstaff, Arizona
North Shore	3	Reading, Massachusetts
Springside Chestnut Hill Academy	3	Philadelphia, Pennsylvania
Robbinsville	3	Trenton, New Jersey
St. Joseph	3	Mishawaka, Indiana
Eastern Carolina University	3	Greenville, North Carolina
Finger Lakes Regional	3	Rochester, New York
Orlando	3	Orlando, Florida
St. Louis	3	St. Louis, Missouri
Oklahoma	3	Oklahoma City, Oklahoma
Central Valley	3	Fresno, California
San Diego	3	Del Mar, California
Ryerson University	3	Toronto, Ontario
Amarillo	3	Amarillo, Texas
Fort Worth	3	Fort Worth, Texas
New Braunfels	3	New Braunfels, Texas
Carleton University	3	Ottawa, Ontario
Beijing Cultural Exchange #2	4	Beijing, China
Central New York	4	Utica, New York
South Pacific	4	Sydney Olympic Park, Australia
Greater Pittsburgh	4	California, Pennsylvania
San Francisco	4	San Francisco, California
SBPLI Long Island #1	4	Hempstead, New York
Huson Valley	4	Suffern, New York
Western New England	4	Springfield, Massachusetts
WPI	4	Worcester, Massachusetts
SBPLI Long Island #2	5	Hempstead, New York
UNC Asheville	5	Asheville, North Carolina
Silicon Valley	6	San Jose, California

===== Districts Postponed Before March 12 =====
District	Location	Number of events affected
Pacific Northwest	Oregon, Washington, and Alaska	7
Michigan	Michigan	21
Israel	Israel	3
Peachtree	Georgia	4
Chesapeake	Washington, D.C., Maryland, and Virginia	5
Mid-Atlantic	Delaware, New Jersey, and eastern Pennsylvania	7

==== Events Suspended or Cancelled on March 12 ====
===== Week 4 =====
Event	Location	Scheduled Date
Central Illinois	Peoria, Illinois	March 18–21
Heartland	Olathe, Kansas	March 18–21
Regional Laguna	Torreón, Mexico	March 18–21
Memphis	Collierville, Tennessee	March 18–21
Wisconsin	Milwaukee, Wisconsin	March 18–21
Colorado	Denver, Colorado	March 18–21
Hawaii	Honolulu, Hawaii	March 18–21
Columbus	Columbus, Indiana	March 19–21
University of Waterloo	Waterloo, Ontario	March 19–21
Austin	Austin, Texas	March 19–21
Dallas	Dallas, Texas	March 19–21
Houston	Houston, Texas	March 19–21
Ventura	Ventura, California	March 19–22
Guilford County	Gibsonville, North Carolina	March 20–22
York University	Toronto, Ontario	March 20–22

===== Week 5 =====
Event	Location	Scheduled Date
Buckeye	Cleveland, Ohio	March 25–28
Smoky Mountains	Knoxville, Tennessee	March 25–28
Iowa	Cedar Falls, Iowa	March 25–28
Bayou	Kenner, Louisiana	March 25–28
10,000 Lakes	Minneapolis, Minnesota	March 25–28
North Star	Minneapolis, Minnesota	March 25–28
Idaho	Nampa, Idaho	March 25–28
Sacramento	Davis, California	March 25–28
Monterey Bay	Seaside, California	March 25–28
Las Vegas	Las Vegas, Nevada	March 25–28
Perry Meridian	Indianapolis, Indiana	March 26–28
Windsor Essex	Windsor, Ontario	March 26–28
Pasadena	Pasadena, Texas	March 26–28
Greater Boston	Revere, Massachusetts	March 27–29
Southern New Hampshire	Bedford, New Hampshire	March 27–29
North Bay	North Bay, Ontario	March 27–29
El Paso	El Paso, Texas	March 27–29

===== Week 6 =====
Event	Location	Scheduled Date
Rocket City	Huntsville, Alabama	April 1 – 4
Seven Rivers	La Crosse, Wisconsin	April 1 – 4
Aerospace Valley	Lancaster, California	April 1 – 4
Arizona West	Glendale, Arizona	April 1 – 4
Canadian Rockies	Calgary, Alberta	April 1 – 4
Green Country	Tulsa, Oklahoma	April 1 – 4
Orange County	Costa Mesa, California	April 1 – 4
Mid-Atlantic District Championship	Bethlehem, Pennsylvania	April 1 – 4
Texas District Championship	San Antonio, Texas	April 1 – 4
Pine Tree	Lewiston, Maine	April 2 – 4
Central Missouri	Sedalia, Missouri	April 2 – 5
New York City	New York City, New York	April 2 – 5
South Florida	West Palm Beach, Florida	April 2 – 5
North Carolina District Championship	Lillington, North Carolina	April 3 – 5
Indiana District Championship	Lafayette, Indiana	April 3 – 5
Hartford	Hartford, Connecticut	April 3 – 5
McMaster University	Hamilton, Ontario	April 3 – 5
Western University	London, Ontario	April 3 – 5

===== Week 7 =====
Event	Location	Scheduled Date
Montreal	Montreal, Quebec	April 8 – 11
New England District Championship	West Springfield, Massachusetts	April 8 – 11
Ontario District Championship	Mississauga, Ontario	April 8 – 11

===== FIRST Championship =====
Event	Location	Scheduled Date
FIRST Championship (Houston)	Houston, Texas	April 15 – 18
FIRST Championship (Detroit)	Detroit, Michigan	April 29 – May 2

=== FIRST Virtual Showcase ===
On May 2, FIRST held a showcase event over Twitch, where they presented several awards that would have been otherwise awarded at the FIRST Championship. This included the Woodie Flowers Award and the Founders Award, which was presented to the FIRST community "in recognition of our members’ use of science and technology to make the world better and stronger." Additionally, it was announced that the championship would remain in Houston and Detroit for the 2021 season.
