= Rebound Rumble =

2012 FIRST Robotics Competition game

- Year: 2012

Season Information
- Number of teams: 2,343
- Number of regionals: 54 (including MI and MAR championships)
- Number of district events: 15
- Championship location: Edward Jones Dome, St Louis, Missouri

FIRST Championship Awards
- Chairman's Award winner: Team 1114 - "Simbotics"
- Woodie Flowers Award winner: Earl Scime
- Founder's Award winner: Google
- Gracious Professionalism Winner: Team 1108 - "Panther Robotics"
- Champions: Team 180 - "S.P.A.M."; Team 25 - "Raider Robotix"; Team 16 - "Baxter Bomb Squad"

Links
- Website: http://www.usfirst.org/roboticsprograms/frc

Rebound Rumble is the 2012 FIRST Robotics Competition game. It is styled similarly to basketball.

== Kickoff ==
The Kickoff event was held on January 7. Speakers included Dean Kamen, Charlie Bolden, Walt Havenstein, Bill Clinton, George W. Bush, Stephen Colbert and will.i.am. It was broadcast on NASA TV beginning at 10:30 EST. The official game animation video was produced by Dave Lavery and narrated by Blair Hundertmark.

== Rules ==
=== Alliances ===
The game is played by two alliances, red and blue, of three teams each. No alliances are ever purposely the same. When the alliances are picked it is totally random, and you can be on either red or blue alliance. Each team has bumpers made from cloth and pool noodles, with their numbers on it, one set painted blue and the other red. Each team will use certain bumpers according to the color alliance they will be on. Alliances compete in 135-second matches to earn as many points as possible by scoring basketballs into hoops or by balancing tilt bridges.

=== Field ===
The field is a carpeted area 27 feet by 54 feet designed to mimic a basketball court. At both ends are the driver stations and an array of basketball hoops. There is one low hoop, two middle hoops, and one high hoop. Across the narrow dimension of the field a 4 inch high wall, along which are placed three tilting bridges at a height of 12 inches. The bridges at the edges are color-coded for each alliance, and the center bridge, called the Coopertition bridge, is available for both alliances.

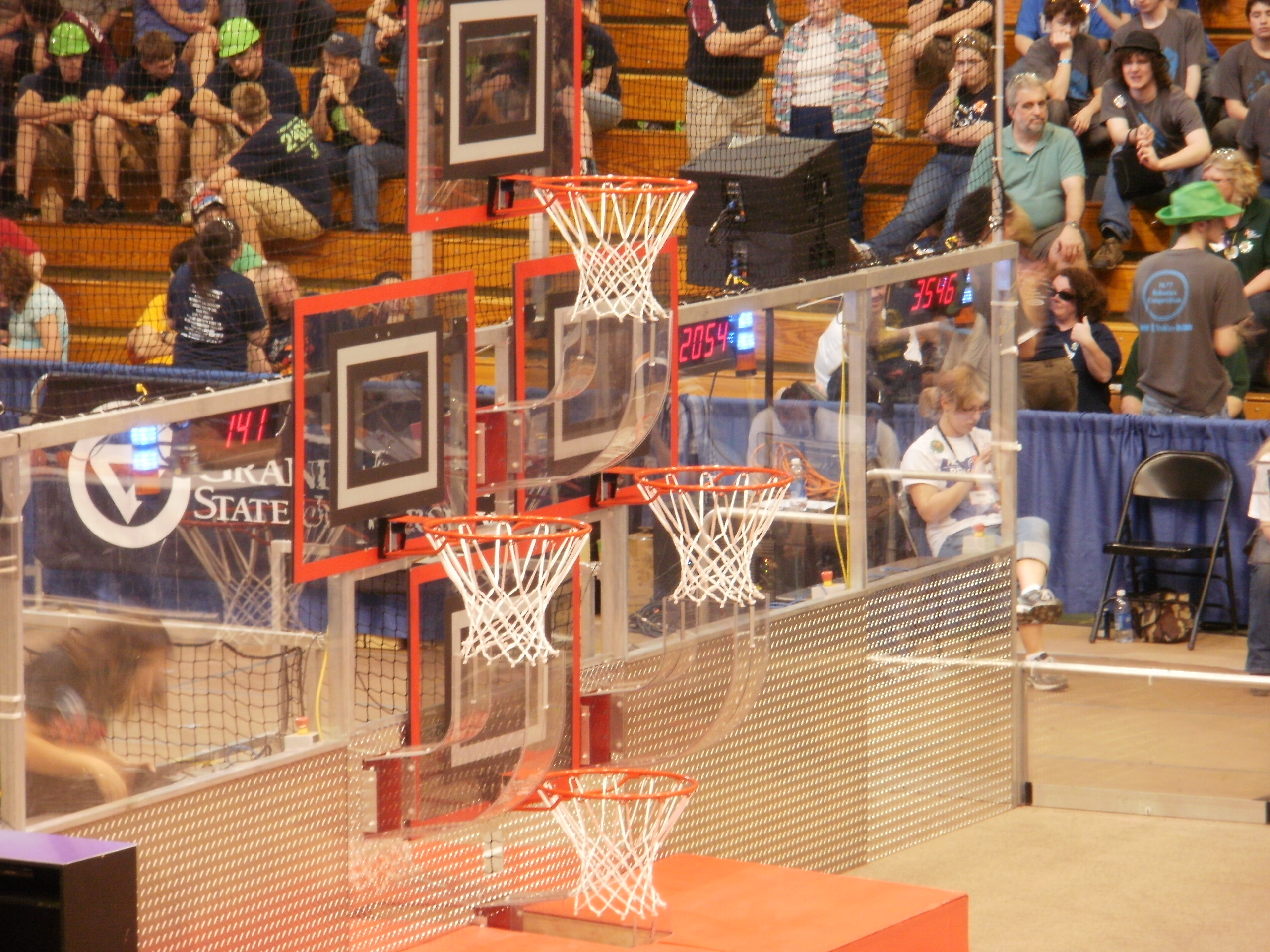
Basketball hoops at one end of the field

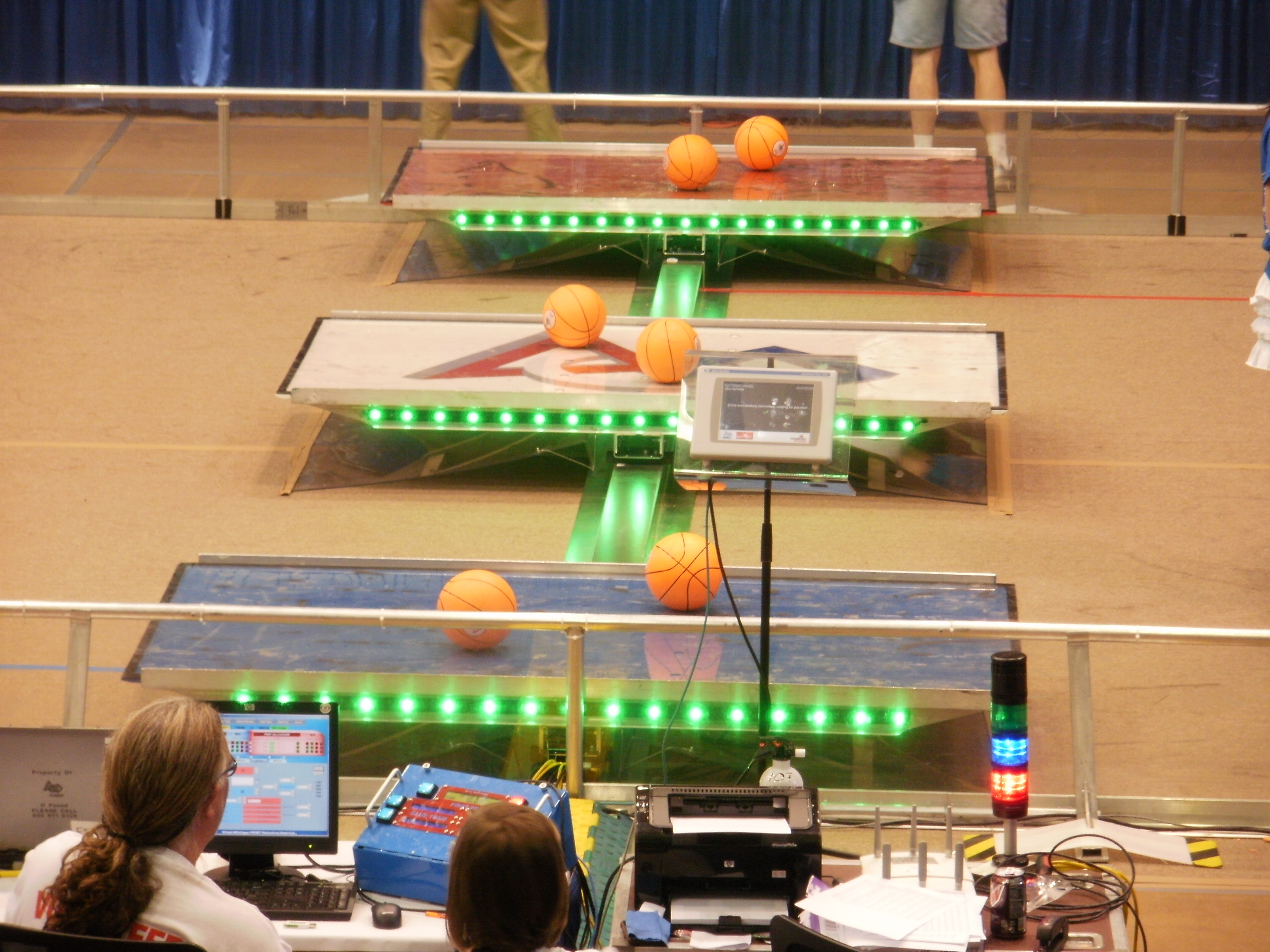
Bridges at the beginning of a match

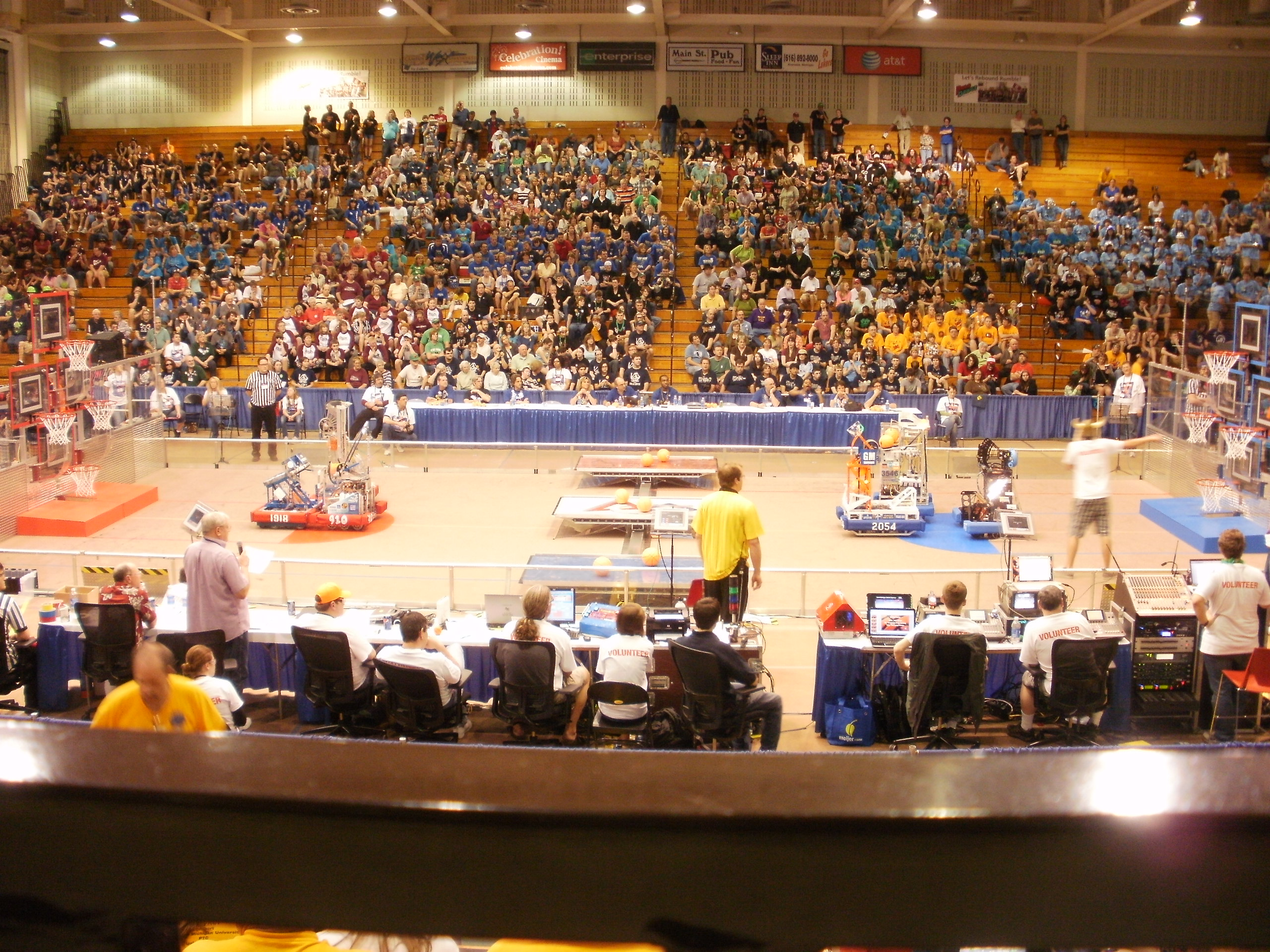
The field at the beginning of a match at the West Michigan district

=== Matches ===
Robots start a match in contact with their key, the semicircular plastic area approximately at the free-throw line. Each match lasts 135 seconds and is divided into two portions: Hybrid mode and Teleoperated (Teleop) mode. During Hybrid mode, two robots on each alliance have to act autonomously, while the third may be controlled by means of a Microsoft Kinect or act autonomously. During Teleop, all robots are controlled by human drivers.

At events, there are two types of matches: qualification and elimination. Robots compete in qualification matches to determine seed and who will compete in the elimination bracket.

=== Scoring ===
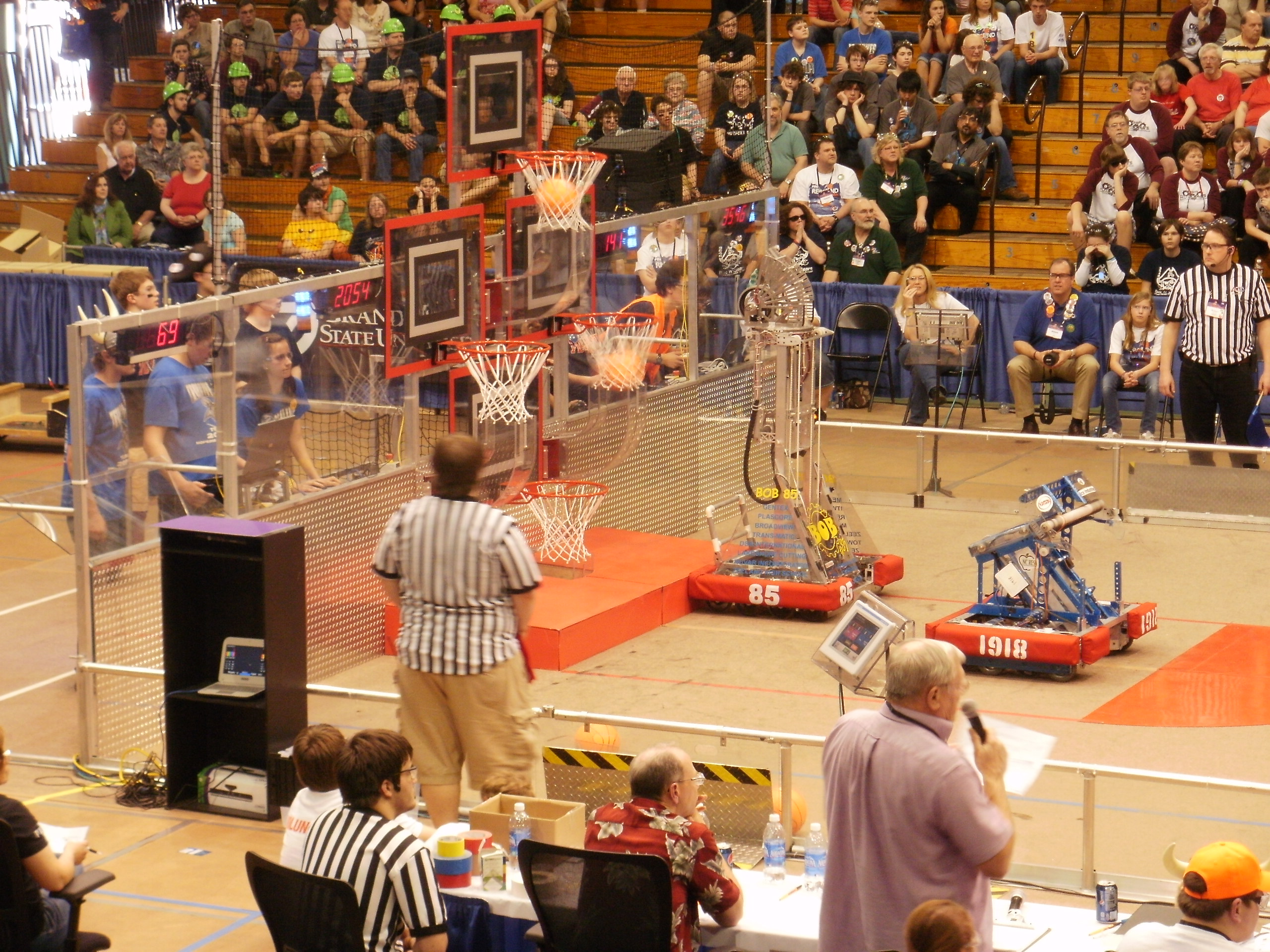
Two robots scoring baskets simultaneously

Throughout a match, teams can score points as follows by scoring basketballs into hoops:

Hoop	Hybrid	Teleop
Top row	6	3
Middle row	5	2
Bottom row	4	1

At the end of the match, points are scored for balanced alliance bridges, but not the Coopertition bridge.

Number of robots balanced on bridge	Qualification match	Elimination match
1	10	10
2	20	20
3	20	40

Balancing the Coopertition bridge with a robot from each alliance earns each alliance 2 Coopertition points toward their qualification seed and the Coopertition Award. If the two robots do not balance the bridge, 1 Coopertition point is awarded.

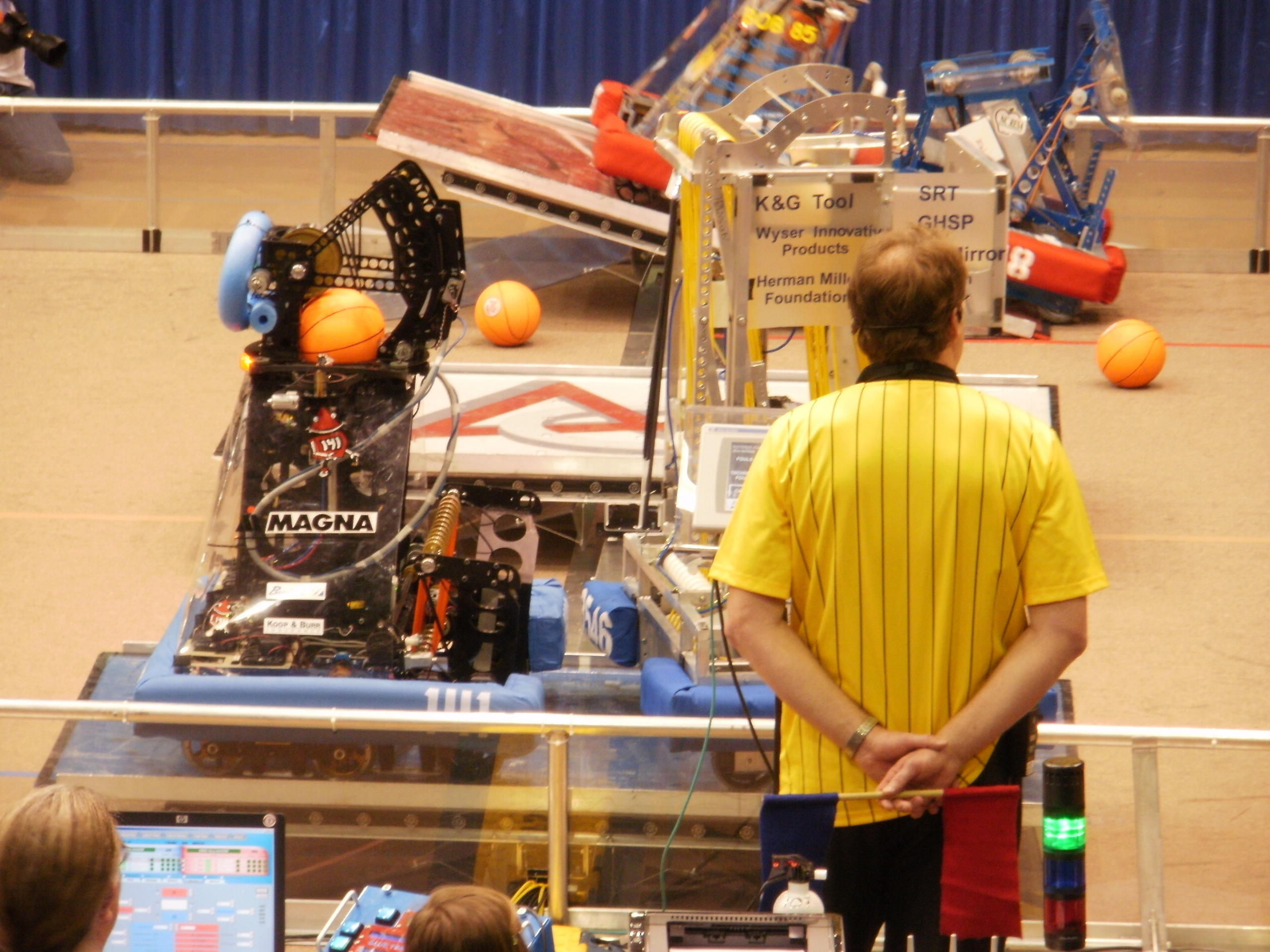
Two robots balanced on the near bridge

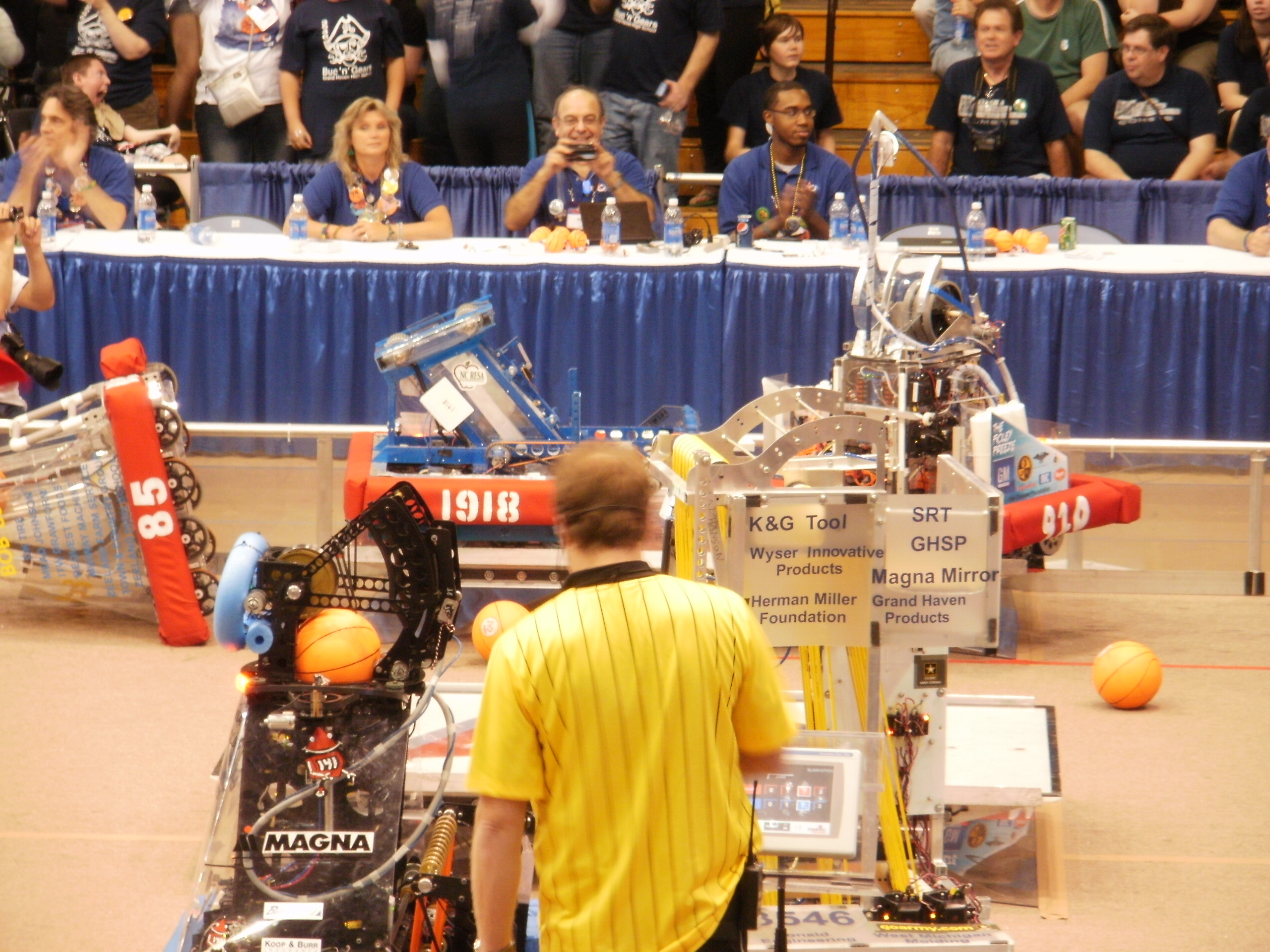
The difficulty of balancing three robots

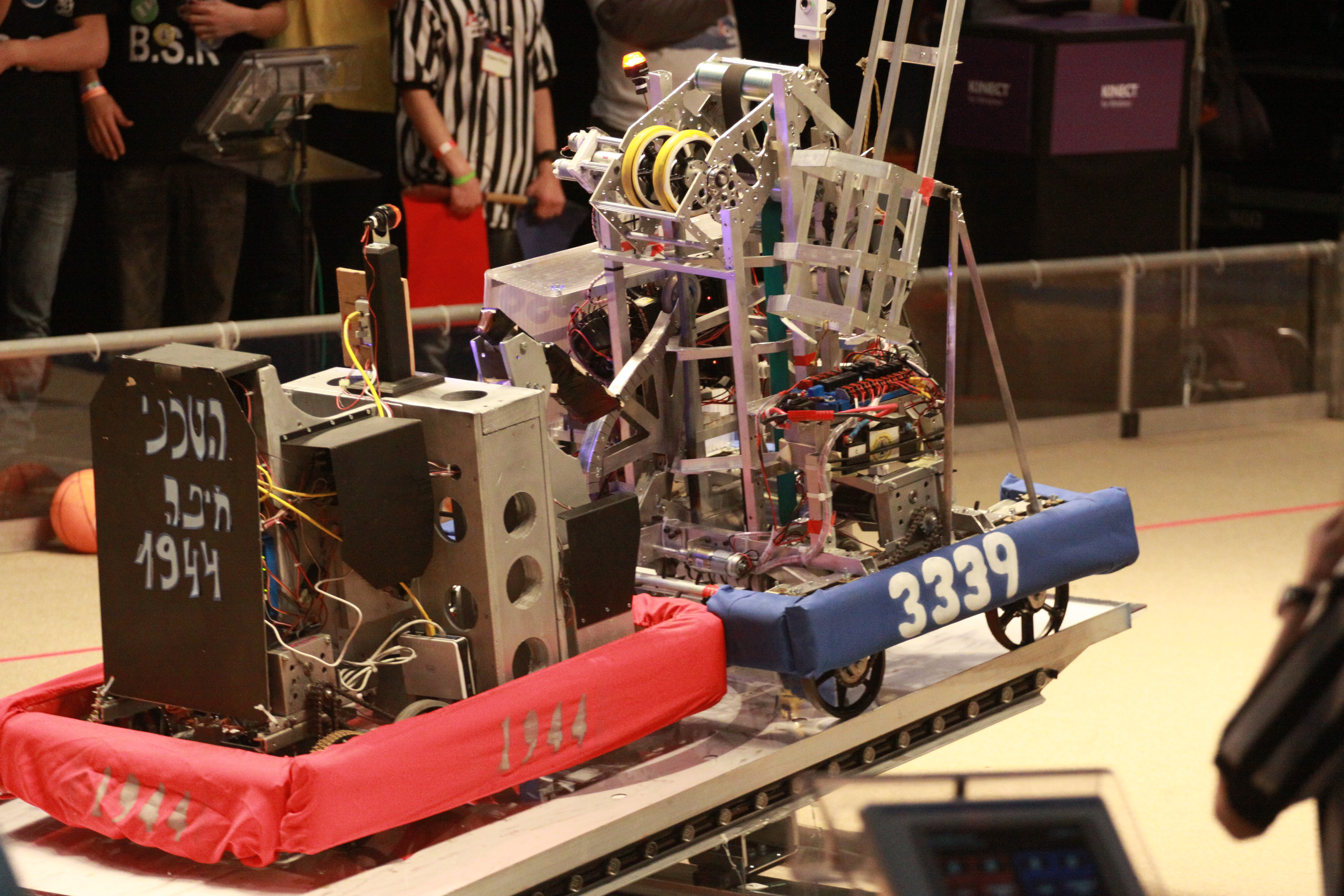
Working to balance the Coopertition bridge

=== Robots ===
Robots must not exceed horizontal dimensions of 28 inches by 38 inches, begin each match less than 60 inches tall and never exceed 84 inches in height. An allowance is made for one protrusion of no more than 14 inches (so long as this protrusion is retracted at the start of the match). Discounting the battery and protective bumpers, the robot cannot exceed a weight of 120 pounds.

== Events ==
=== Regionals ===
The following regional events were held in 2012:

Week 1

- Greater Kansas City Regional - Kansas City, MO
- BAE Systems Granite State Regional - Manchester, NH
- Smoky Mountains Regional - Knoxville, TN
- Alamo Regional - San Antonio, TX
- San Diego Regional - San Diego, CA
- Israel Regional - Tel Aviv, Israel

Week 2

- Greater Toronto East Regional - Oshawa, ON
- Orlando Regional - Orlando, FL
- WPI Regional - Worcester, MA
- Chesapeake Regional - Baltimore, MD
- Lake Superior Regional - Duluth, MN
- Finger Lakes Regional - Rochester, NY
- Autodesk Oregon Regional - Portland, OR
- Pittsburgh Regional - Pittsburgh, PA

Week 3

- Festival de Robotique FRC a Montreal Regional - Montreal, QC
- Sacramento Regional - Davis, CA
- Los Angeles Regional - Long Beach, CA
- Peachtree Regional - Duluth, GA
- Boilermaker Regional - West Lafayette, IN
- Bayou Regional - Kenner, LA
- Utah Regional co-sponsored by NASA and Platt - West Valley City, UT
- Virginia Regional - Richmond, VA
- New York City Regional - New York, NY

Week 4

- Waterloo Regional - Waterloo, ON
- Arizona Regional - Chandler, AZ
- Colorado Regional - Denver, CO
- Hawaii Regional sponsored by BAE Systems - Honolulu, HI
- Midwest Regional - Chicago, IL
- Boston Regional - Boston, MA
- St. Louis Regional - St. Louis, MO
- Buckeye Regional - Cleveland, OH
- Palmetto Regional - North Charleston, SC
- Seattle Cascade Regional - Seattle, WA
- Seattle Olympic Regional - Seattle, WA
- Wisconsin Regional - Milwaukee, WI

Week 5

- Greater Toronto West Regional - Mississauga, ON
- Silicon Valley Regional - San Jose, CA
- Northeast Utilities FIRST Connecticut Regional - Hartford, CT
- Washington DC Regional - Washington, DC
- South Florida Regional - Boca Raton, FL
- Minnesota North Star Regional - Minneapolis, MN
- Minnesota 10000 Lakes Regional - Minneapolis, MN
- SBPLI Long Island Regional - Hempstead, NY
- Oklahoma Regional - Oklahoma City, OK
- Dallas East Regional sponsored by jcpenney - Dallas, TX
- Dallas West Regional sponsored by jcpenney - Dallas, TX

Week 6

- Central Valley Regional - Madera, CA
- North Carolina Regional - Raleigh, NC
- Las Vegas Regional - Las Vegas, NV
- Queen City Regional - Cincinnati, OH
- Lone Star Regional - Houston, TX
- Spokane Regional - Cheney, WA

=== Districts ===
The two districts of 2012 are Michigan and Mid-Atlantic Robotics (MAR):

Week 1

- Kettering University FIRST Robotics District Competition - Flint, MI USA
- Gull Lake FIRST Robotics District Competition - Richland, MI
- Hatboro-Horsham FIRST Robotics District Competition - Horsham, PA USA

Week 2

- Traverse City FIRST Robotics District Competition - Traverse City, MI USA
- Waterford FIRST Robotics District Competition - Waterford, MI USA
- Chestnut Hill FIRST Robotics District Competition - Philadelphia, PA USA
- Rutgers University FIRST Robotics District Competition - New Brunswick, NJ USA

Week 3

- West Michigan FIRST Robotics District Competition - Allendale, MI USA
- Detroit FIRST Robotics District Competition - Detroit, MI USA

Week 4

- Niles FIRST Robotics District Competition - Niles, MI USA
- Northville FIRST Robotics District Competition - Northville, MI USA
- Lenape FIRST Robotics District Competition - Tabernacle, NJ USA

Week 5

- Livonia FIRST Robotics District Competition - Livonia, MI USA
- Troy FIRST Robotics District Competition - Troy, MI USA
- Mount Olive FIRST Robotics District Competition - Flanders, NJ USA

Week 7 (Championships)

- Michigan FRC State Championship - Ypsilanti, MI
- Mid-Atlantic Robotics FRC Region Championship - Philadelphia, PA

=== World Championships ===
The World Championships for Rebound Rumble were held April 26–28 at the Edward Jones Dome in St Louis, Missouri.

==== Final Round at Einstein Field ====
Semifinals
(United States) 2194 - 118 - 548	34	56	N/P	0W
(United States) 16 - 25 - 180	71	104	N/P	2W
(Canada) 1114 - 4334 - 2056	54	61	N/P	0W
(United States) 233 - 987 - 207	83	83	N/P	2W

Finals
(United States) 16 - 25 - 180	73	89	N/P	2W
(United States) 233 - 987 - 207	65	45	N/P	0W
