= Stack Attack =

2003 FIRST Robotics Competition game

- Year: 2003

Season Information
- Number of teams: 787
- Number of regionals: 23
- Championship location: Reliant Park, Houston, Texas

FIRST Championship Awards
- Chairman's Award winner: Team 103 - "Cybersonics"
- Woodie Flowers Award winner: Andrew Baker
- Champions: Team 65 - "The Huskie Brigade"; Team 111 - "WildStang"; Team 469 - "Las Guerrillas"

Stack Attack was the game for the 2003 FIRST Robotics Competition. Two teams of two robots compete by moving large Sterilite bins into their zones and arranging them into stacks.

== Layout ==
At the beginning of the match, each team is given 4 bins, which they may arrange as they see fit. Each of these bins are marked with a retroreflective tape that is highly visible to the infrared sensors included in the kit of parts. In the center of the field on top of the ramp is a large stack of 29 bins.

== Object ==
The object of this game is for each two player alliance to rack up more points than the other team. Scoring is one point for every bin in an alliance's scoring zone, multiplied by the height of their highest stack. Each robot on the top of the ramp at the end of the match adds 25 points to an alliance's score. Bins that are supported by a robot do not count towards the final score.

== Gameplay ==
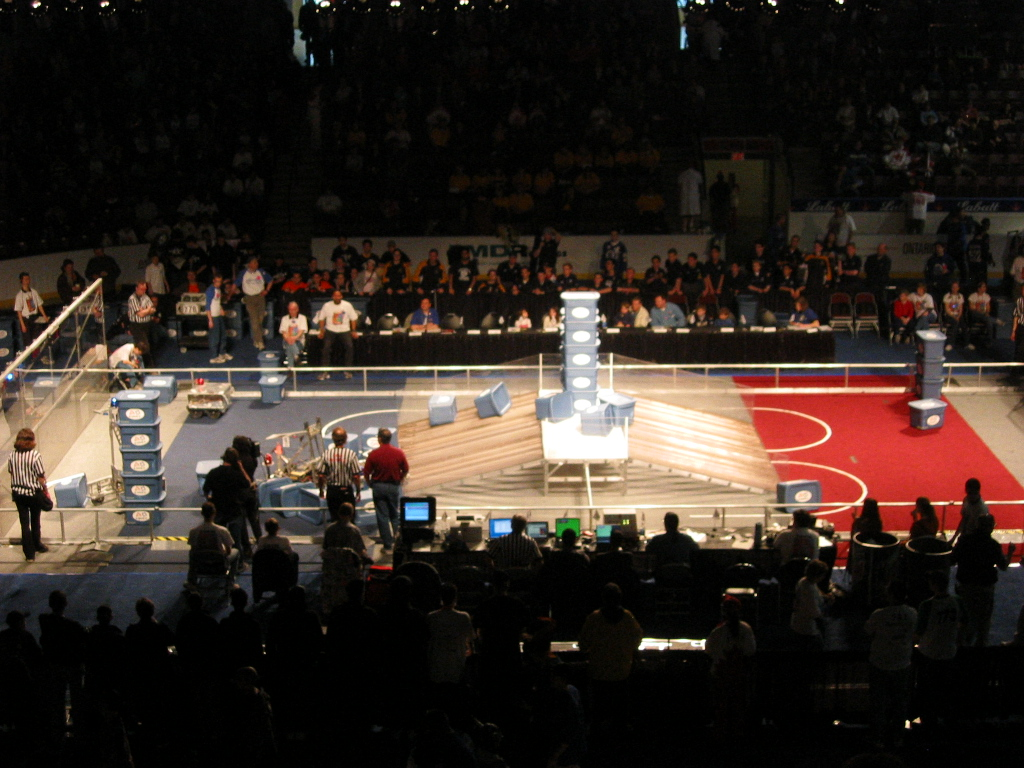
A Stack Attack match in progress

=== Human Player ===
The Human player period is 10 seconds at the start of the match where one designated person from each team may walk onto the field and pass or receive one or more of their four bins to their allied team's human player. This allowed teams to create stacks higher than the initial 4-high stacks. The human players needed to return to a pressure-sensitive pad before their robot was activated.

=== Autonomous ===
The autonomous period was 15 seconds long in Stack Attack. During the autonomous period, teams could use infrared sensors to hunt the opposing team's stacks, use the same sensors to follow white tape or use dead reckoning to navigate to the center stacks.

=== Human-controlled ===
The human controlled phase began immediately after the autonomous period. During this phase, robots would attempt to amass the most bins on their side, while preventing the opposing teams from getting bins onto their scoring area and knocking down opposing stacks. Robots that were capable of stacking would use this time to begin building and protecting a stack of bins.

== Strategies ==
=== Autonomous ===
The most successful strategy in autonomous mode was to get the robot to run through the centre stack and push as many bins as possible onto that robot's scoring end. Since it was very difficult to move bins from one end of the field to the other, once most of the centre bins landed in one end, often that team would win. Teams could also try to seek out and knock over the stacks of bins that the human players had placed at the start of the match.

=== Human Controlled Game ===
Often the main game was a chaotic period where teams would try and clear out their own zone while attempting to keep as many bins on their scoring section as possible. Robots that were capable of stacking would usually protect their stack for the entire match, then release it just as the match ended.

== Events ==
The following regional events were held in 2003:

- Arizona Regional - Phoenix, AZ
- BAE Systems/Granite State Regional - Manchester, NH
- Buckeye Regional - Cleveland, OH
- Canadian Regional - Mississauga, ON
- Central Florida Regional - Orlando, FL
- Chesapeake Regional - Annapolis, MD
- Great Lakes Regional - Ypsilanti, MI
- Johnson & Johnson Mid-Atlantic Regional - Piscataway, NJ
- Lone Star Regional - Houston, TX
- Midwest Regional - Evanston, Il
- NASA/VCU Regional - Richmond, VA
- New York City Regional - New York City, NY
- Pacific Northwest Regional - Seattle, WA
- Peachtree Regional - Duluth, GA
- Philadelphia Regional - Philadelphia, PA
- Pittsburgh Regional - Pittsburgh, PA
- St. Louis Regional - St. Charles, MO
- Sacramento Regional - Sacramento, CA
- SBPLI Long Island Regional - Long Island, NY
- Silicon Valley Regional - San Jose, CA
- Southern California Regional - Los Angeles, CA
- UTC New England Regional - Hartford, CT
- Western Michigan Regional - Grand Rapids, MI

The championship was held at Reliant Park in Houston, TX.
