= Leanne Cushing =

Mechanical engineer

- Citizenship: United States
- Education: Rochester Institute of Technology
- Scientific career
- Fields: Mathematics, Robotics

Leanne Cushing is a mechanical engineer in the field of Robotics and Technology. She spent her high school years competing in FIRST Robotics competitions which sparked her interest in doing robotics in her adult life. Throughout her career she has worked as a mechanical engineer at several note-worthy companies such as Husqvarna, Toyota, and Apple and co-founded a company called Domovi. In her adult life she became captain of the BattleBots Team Valkyrie where she designed and managed her team until 2022 where she gave her captain role to Lucy Du. Leanne Cushing took back over the team in 2024 where Valkyrie won one of the BattleBots Face-offs events qualifying the team for BattleBots Pro-League.

== Education and career ==
From 2005 to 2010, Cushing attended the Rochester Institute of Technology (RIT) where she obtained a Bachelor of Science in Mechanical Engineering with a focus in Aerospace. From December 2008 to May 2010, Cushing worked as an author for Reporter Magazine where she wrote magazine articles. From October 2010 to December 2011 Cushing worked as a Chassis Design Engineer at Husqvarna in Charlotte, NC. As part of her work at Husqvarna, Cushing was issued a patent for a front-mounted stand-on lawn care vehicle. Cushing is currently working full-time as a mechanical engineer at Bellwether Coffee.

== Awards and honors ==
- Cushing was awarded the Rev 3 Top 20 Women in Tech award in 2017 from Rev Boston.
- Cushing's Battlebot, Valkyrie, received the Most Destructive award in 2020. Valkyrie is the first robot with a female-led team to win Most Destructive.
