= Crescendo (FIRST) =

2024 FIRST Robotics Competition game

- Year: 2024

Season Information
- Number of teams: 3,468
- Number of regionals: 62
- Number of district events: 109
- Championship location: Houston; George R. Brown Convention Center

FIRST Championship Awards
- Impact Award winner: 2486 - "CocoNuts"
- Woodie Flowers Award winner: Norman Morgan - Team 2468
- Founder's Award winner: Mark Rober - YouTuber and engineer
- Champions: 1690 - "Orbit"; 4522 - "Team SCREAM"; 9432 - "Team 8-Bit"; 321 - "RoboLancers"

Crescendo, stylized as CRESCENDO and officially known as Crescendo presented by Haas for sponsorship reasons, was the FIRST Robotics Competition game for the 2024 season. The game is themed around music and concerts as part of the overall 2023-2024 FIRST in Show season. The game's kickoff event occurred on January 6, 2024, and was streamed live on Twitch.

The game is based on two game concepts that were submitted to the 2021 Game Design Challenge by Team 1678 (challenge winners) and Team 3061 (challenge finalists). Gameplay mainly consists of robots scoring foam rings, called Notes, into goals on their end of the field. At the end of the match, the robots move to truss structures called Stages and climb on metal chains to earn additional points.

== Field and Scoring ==
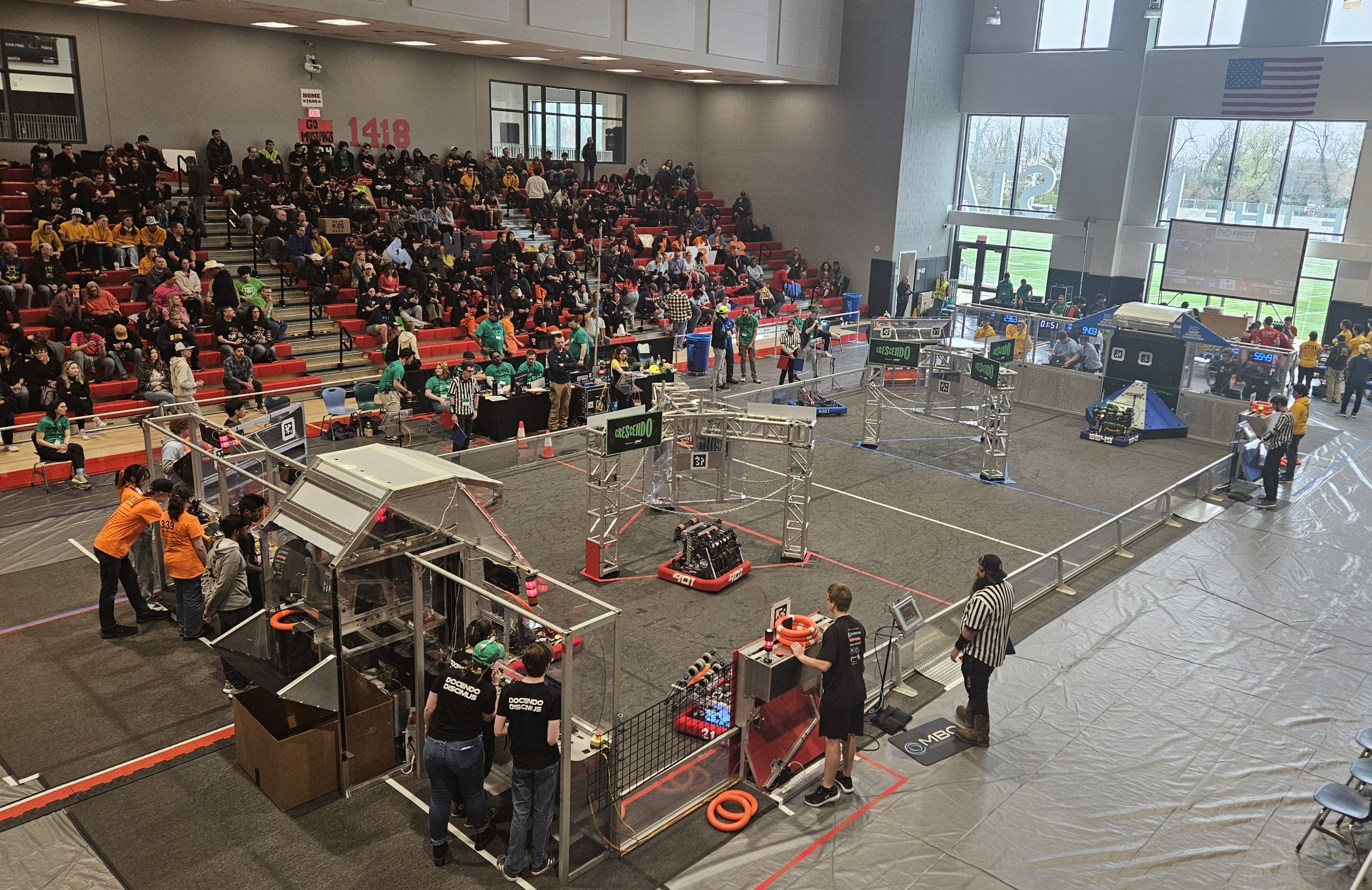
The field during a match.

Crescendo is played on a 27 feet (8.2 m) by 54 feet (16 m) field covered in grey carpet. The field is surrounded by low polycarbonate walls on the long sides and taller alliance station walls on the short sides. The two Amps on the long sides are connected to the alliance stations by a taller wall made of wire mesh panels.

The field is divided in half by a white line, with each half including an alliance's Wing, Stage Zone, and Amp Zone and the other alliance's Source Zone. Alliances work to score Notes at their Speaker, located on the left side of their opponent's alliance station. Robots can also score Notes at their Amp on their side of the field. At the end of the match, robots move to their Stage and climb chains to earn additional points.

=== Game Pieces ===
The only game piece in Crescendo is the Note. Notes are orange foam tori (rings) with a 10-inch (254 mm) inside diameter and 14-inch (356 mm) outside diameter with a thickness of 2 inches (50.8 mm). High Notes are a variety of Note and are marked by three equidistant pieces of white tape wrapped around the torus.

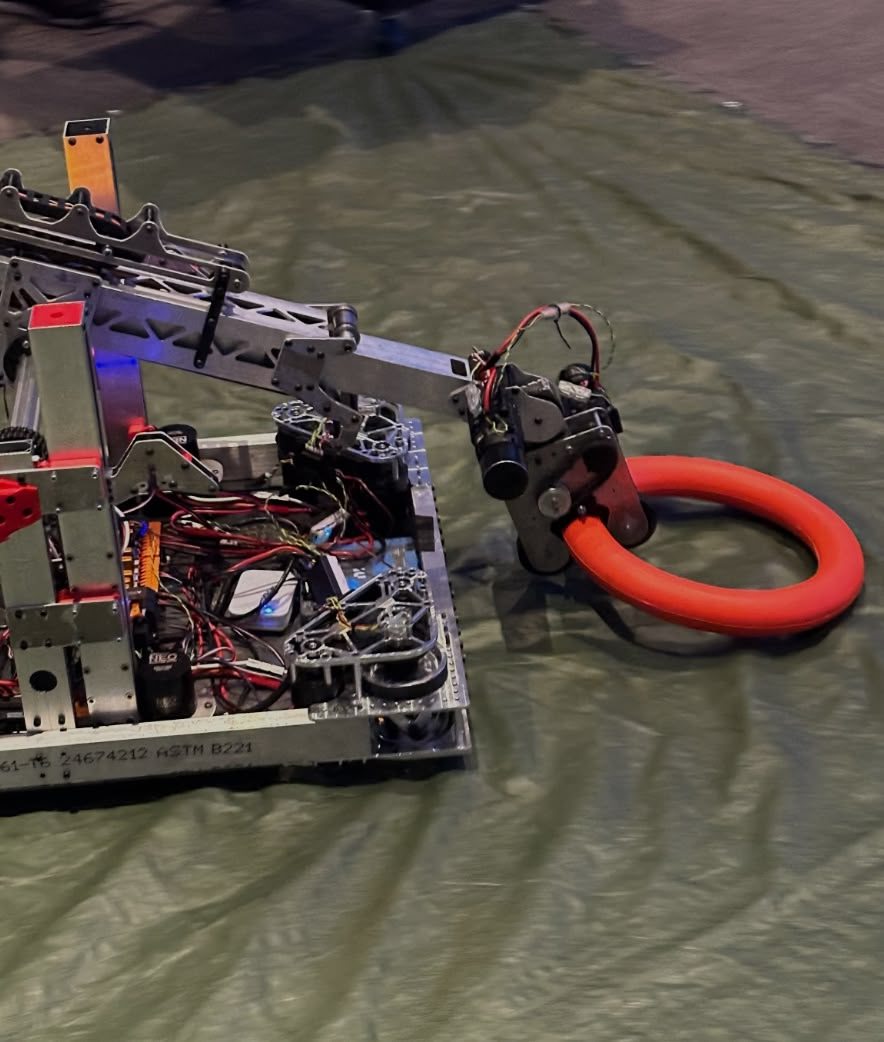
A robot holding a Note.

=== Player Areas ===
==== Alliance Stations ====
There are two alliance stations on the short sides of the field, one for each alliance. Each station is divided into three smaller driver's stations where the teams that make up the alliance control their robots. In addition to the standard e-stop button, each driver's station now includes an autonomous stop (a-stop) that can be used to stop a robot during the autonomous period. Once the autonomous period ends, the a-stop expires and returns control of the robot to the team. The team number displays hung above the driver's stations have also been upgraded to support five-digit teams.

==== Human Player Stations ====
The only type of human player station in Crescendo is the Source. The two Sources (one per alliance) are used by human players to introduce Notes into the field using a chute and are located on the other side of the field from an alliance's Alliance Station. Robots can navigate to the Source using two AprilTags mounted on the left and right sides of the chute. Even though the Amps are not fully classified as human player stations, a human player is usually present at each one for the duration of a match to earn the coopertition and amplification bonuses for their corresponding alliances.

=== Scoring Areas ===
==== Amps ====
The two Amps are located on the same side of the field as their alliance's station. Once two Notes are scored in an Amp, a human player can press a button to amplify their alliance's Speaker points for ten seconds or until 4 notes are scored. Once the amplification ends, another two Notes must be scored before it can be reactivated. If both alliances score a Note in their Amp in the first 45 seconds of the teleoperated period, they can press another button to earn coopertition bonus. A Note used to earn the bonus cannot be used to amplify the Speaker.

==== Speakers ====
Each alliance has one Speaker located in between the left and center Alliance Stations of the opposing alliance. Each speaker includes an opening through which Notes can be scored, with the lowest edge of the opening 6.5 feet (2.0 m) above the carpet and the highest edge 6.9 feet (2.1 m) above the carpet. The opening is 3.42 feet (1.04 m) wide and extends 2.33 feet (0.71 m) into the field. Each Speaker also includes a Subwoofer that indicates whether the Speaker has been amplified and the amount of time left on the amplification. Alliances can earn the Melody Ranking Point (RP) by scoring at least 18 Notes (21 if the event is a district championship, 25 at the FIRST Championship) in the Amp and Speaker. This threshold is reduced to 15 Notes (18 if the event is a district championship, 21 at the FIRST Championship) if the coopertition bonus is earned.

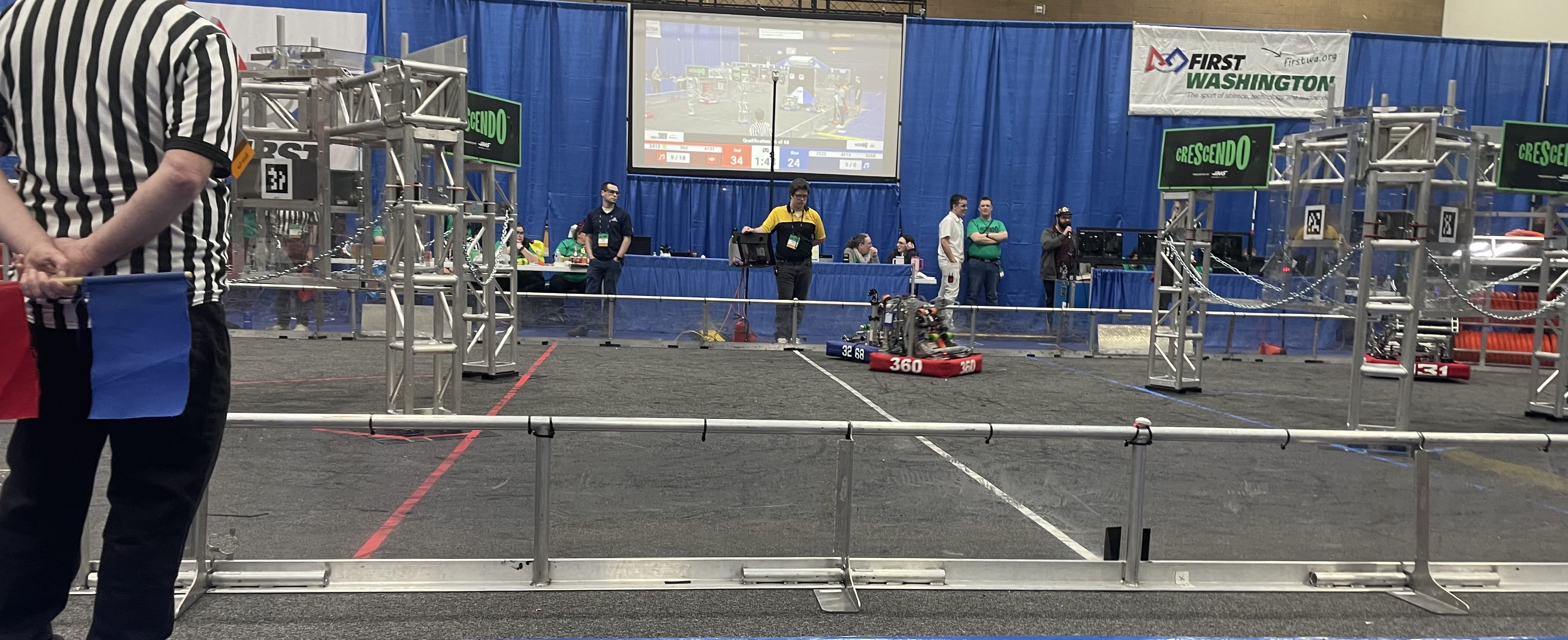
A side view of the Crescendo field showing the two STAGE truss structures.

==== Stages ====
The two Stages are three-legged trusses located 10.08 feet (3.07 m) from its corresponding Alliance Station. Each Stage includes a six-sided Core suspended approximately 2.33 feet (0.71 m) above the carpet and three metal chains connected between the legs of the truss. The chains droop to a height of 2.33 feet (0.71 m) above the carpet and rest 1.33 feet (0.41 m) away from the Core. The three wider sides of the Core also include a Trap where a Note can be scored, with the bottom of the Trap located 4.67 feet (1.42 m) above the carpet.

During the endgame, robots can earn points by climbing on the chains. An alliance can also earn the Ensemble RP by scoring at least 10 Stage points while having at least two climbing robots. Harmony points can also be earned if two robots successfully climb on the same chain. If a human player successfully tosses a High Note onto one of three pegs (known as a Microphone) on top of the Stage, any robots directly below that Microphone are Spotlit and earn additional climb points.

==== Scoring Summary ====
Action	Autonomous	Teleoperated	Ranking Points/Bonus (in Qualification)
Robot exits Starting Zone	2 points		
Note scored in Amp	2 points	1 point	
Note scored in Speaker (Not amplified)	5 points	2 points	
Note scored in Speaker (Amplified)		5 points	
Note scored in Trap		5 points	
Climb (Not Spotlit)		3 points	
Climb (Spotlit)		4 points	
Park		1 point	
Harmony		2 points	
Melody Bonus			1 RP
Ensemble Bonus			1 RP
Coopertition Bonus			Melody Bonus threshold reduced to 15 for both alliances (18 if the event is a district championship, 21 at the FIRST Championship)
Win			2 RP
Tie			1 RP
Foul	2 points to opposing alliance	2 points to opposing alliance	
Tech Foul	5 points to opposing alliance	5 points to opposing alliance	

== Events ==
The 2024 regular season is divided into six weeks, with many events occurring simultaneously during each week. After the end of the regular season, teams that have qualified compete in the FIRST Championship in Houston.

=== Week 1 ===
Event	Location	Date	Champions
FIRST Israel (ISR) District Event #1	Hadera, Haifa District, Israel	February 25 – 27	1690 Orbit, 3339 BumbleB, 5135 Black Unicorns
ISR District Event #2	Hadera, Haifa District, Israel	February 27 – 29	2231 OnyxTronix, 7039 XO, 9739 Firefly
Canadian Pacific Regional	Victoria, British Columbia, Canada	February 28 – March 2	359 Hawaiian Kids, 4270 Crusaders, 8338 Boucherie Bears Robotics, 6902 STRIKE
Lake Superior Regional	Duluth, Minnesota	February 28 – March 2	1732 Hilltopper Robotics, 2052 KnightKrawler, 6217 Bomb-Botz, 7915 Ripon Robotics
Northern Lights Regional	Duluth, Minnesota	February 28 – March 2	4230 TopperBots, 6147 Tonkabots, 5232 Talons
Utah Regional	West Valley City, Utah	February 28 – March 2	1410 The Kraken, 1339 AngelBotics, 5851 Striking Vikings, 5933 JudgeMent Call Robotics
Brazil Regional	Brasília, Distrito Federal, Brazil	February 28 – March 2	1156 Under Control, 7565 SESI SENAI ROBONÁTICOS, 8882 Infinity BR
South Florida Regional	Fort Lauderdale, Florida	February 28 – March 2	179 Children of the Swamp, 180 S.P.A.M., 744 Shark Attack
Greater Pittsburgh Regional	Pittsburgh, Pennsylvania	February 28 – March 2	325 Respawn Robotics, 4611 OZone, 3504 Girls of Steel
Festival de Robotique Regional	Montréal, Quebec, Canada	February 28 – March 2	7605 ASTRO, 3990 Tech for Kids, 4952 Les Carnicas
Regional Monterrey	Monterrey, Nuevo León, Mexico	February 28 – March 2	7421 PrepaTec - OVERTURE, 4403 PrepaTec - ROULT - Peñoles, 3472 PrepaTec - Buluk
New England (NE) District Granite State Event	Salem, New Hampshire	February 29 – March 2	6329 The Bucks' Wrath, 5687 The Outliers, 238 Crusaders
FIRST in Texas (FIT) District Katy Event	Katy, Texas	February 29 – March 2	118 Robonauts, 8576 Golden Warrior Robotics, 7616 Cerberus
FIT District Waco Event	Waco, Texas	February 29 – March 2	2468 Team Appreciate, 3005 RoboChargers, 2158 the ausTIN CANs
FIRST in Michigan (FIM) District Kettering University Event #1	Flint, Michigan	February 29 – March 2	1 The Juggernauts, 245 Adambots, 2145 HAZMATS
FIM District Milford Event	Highland Township, Michigan	February 29 – March 2	67 The HOT Team, 503 Frog Force, 7660 The Byting Irish
Pacific Northwest (PNW) District Clackamas Academy Event	Oregon City, Oregon	February 29 – March 2	2557 SOTAbots, 3674 CloverBots, 6696 Cardinal Dynamics
Hueneme Port Regional	Port Hueneme, California	February 29 – March 3	4481 The Rembrandts, 3647 Millennium Falcons, 9452 LHS Steel Stingers
Silicon Valley Regional	San Jose, California	February 29 – March 3	581 Blazing Bulldogs, 1678 Citrus Circuits, 8048 HH East Palo Alto Churrobots
FIRST Mid-Atlantic (FMA) District Mount Olive Event	Flanders, New Jersey	March 1 – 3	1676 The Pascack PI-oneers, 222 Tigertrons, 5438 Technological Terrors
FMA District Hatboro-Horsham Event	Horsham, Pennsylvania	March 1 – 3	2539 Krypton Cougars, 5895 Peddie Robotics, 9027 PATH to Domination
NE District Hartford Event	Hartford, Connecticut	March 1 – 3	175 Buzz Robotics, 177 Bobcat Robotics, 5112 The Gongoliers
FIRST Indiana (FIN) District Mishawaka Event	Mishawaka, Indiana	March 1 – 3	461 Westside Boiler Invasion, 3176 Purple Precision, 3865 Riley WildBots
FIM District Battle Creek Event	Augusta, Michigan	March 1 – 3	3357 COMETS, 6002 ZooBOTix, 9215 T-Town Tech
FIM District Berrien Springs Event	Berrien Springs, Michigan	March 1 – 3	4237 Team Lance-A-Bot, 302 The Dragons, 201 The FEDS
FIM District Jackson at Columbia Event	Brooklyn, Michigan	March 1 – 3	6081 Digital Dislocators, 1076 Pi Hi Samurai, 8424 Tractor Technicians Next Gen
FIRST North Carolina (FNC) District Orange County Event	Chapel Hill, North Carolina	March 1 – 3	7763 Carrborobotics, 4795 Eastbots, 8757 GeodeBots
FIRST Chesapeake (CHS) District Ashland Event	Ashland, Virginia	March 1 – 3	1731 Fresta Valley Robotics Club, 8592 Newton², 2998 VikingBots
CHS District Blacksburg Event	Blacksburg, Virginia	March 1 – 3	9496 LYNK, 449 The Blair Robot Project, 1885 Comet Robotics
PNW District Glacier Peak Event	Snohomish, Washington	March 1 – 3	2910 Jack in the Bot, 360 The Revolution, 3049 BremerTron

=== Week 2 ===
Event	Location	Date	Champions
Smoky Mountains Regional	Knoxville, Tennessee	March 3 – 6	801 Horsepower, 4020 Cyber Tribe, 4630 Robodragons
Istanbul Regional	Istanbul, Istanbul Province, Turkey	March 5 – 7	8613 Barker Greybacks, 6941 Ironpulse Robotics, 8780 TED Robotics
Central Missouri Regional	Sedalia, Missouri	March 6 – 9	1706 Ratchet Rockers, 4522 Team SCREAM, 1982 Cougar Robotics
Great Northern Regional	Grand Forks, North Dakota	March 6 – 9	876 Thunder Robotics, 3276 TOOLCATS, 9576 Loretto Lightning
Hudson Valley Regional	Suffern, New York	March 6 – 9	353 POBots, 1796 Robotigers, 354 G-House Pirates
Green Country Regional	Tulsa, Oklahoma	March 6 – 9	6424 Stealth Panther Robotics, 1730 Team Driven, 8711 The Midnight Ostrich Runners
Arkansas Regional	Searcy, Arkansas	March 6 – 9	16 Bomb Squad, 3937 Breakaway, 6586 Tuskin' Raiders
Peachtree (PCH) District Dalton Event	Dalton, Georgia	March 7 – 9	6919 The Commodores, 1746 OTTO, 4701 Warriors (Team W.I.R.E.)
FIM District Belleville Event	Belleville, Michigan	March 7 – 9	51 Wings of Fire, 8373 The Flying Octopi: 8373 R.R.T., 6538 Linc-Bots
FIM District Escanaba Event	Escanaba, Michigan	March 7 – 9	4391 BraveBots, 857 Superior Roboworks, 6113 M.A.R.C. 1
FIM District Kettering University Event #2	Flint, Michigan	March 7 – 9	5907 CC Shambots, 5114 Titanium Tigers, 5612 Robo-Raptors
FIM District St. Joseph Event	St. Joseph, Michigan	March 7 – 9	2054 Tech Vikes, 2767 Stryke Force, 5610 Turbulence, 5501 Bobcats
PCH District Anderson Event	Anderson, South Carolina	March 7 – 9	2974 Walton Robotics, 343 Metal-In-Motion, 3091 100 Scholars
FIT District Belton Event	Belton, Texas	March 7 – 9	3847 Spectrum -△◅, 5414 Pearadox, 9054 Johnson City Joules
PNW District Oregon State Fairgrounds Event	Salem, Oregon	March 7 – 9	2521 SERT, 2046 Bear Metal, 3712 Robocats
San Francisco Regional	San Francisco, California	March 7 – 10	114 Eaglestrike, 5940 BREAD, 5507 Robotic Eagles
Ventura County Regional	Port Hueneme, California	March 7 – 10	4414 HighTide, 4481 Team Rembrandts, 4276 Surf City Vikings, 3863 Pantherbotics
Bosphorus Regional	Istanbul, Istanbul Province, Turkey	March 8 – 10	4613 Barker Redbacks, 9483 İstanbul Wildcats, 8056 Laissez Faire
NE District BSU Event	Bridgewater, Massachusetts	March 8 – 10	78 AIR STRIKE, 125 NUTRONs, 6731 Record Robotics
FMA District Allentown Event	Allentown, New Jersey	March 8 – 10	1923 The MidKnight Inventors, 103 Cybersonics, 2577 Pingry Robotics
FMA District Seneca Event	Tabernacle, New Jersey	March 8 – 10	365 Miracle Workerz, 316 LUNATECS, 1257 Parallel Universe
ONT District Newmarket Complex Event	Newmarket, Ontario, Canada	March 8 – 10	2056 OP Robotics, 4039 MakeShift Robotics, 6854 Viking Robotics
ONT District Centennial College Event	Scarborough, Ontario, Canada	March 8 – 10	7558 ALT-F4, 1325 Inverse Paradox, 5834 R3P2
NE District Waterbury Event	Waterbury, Connecticut	March 8 – 10	176 Aces High, 230 Gaelhawks, 839 Rosie Robotics
FIM District Woodhaven Event	Brownstown Charter Township, Michigan	March 8 – 10	3604 Goon Squad, 5436 Cyber Cats, 280 TnT
FIM District Lake City Event	Lake City, Michigan	March 8 – 10	8873 Rockefeller Robotics, 3618 Petoskey Paladins, 8517 Bounty Hungers
FNC District UNC Pembroke Event	Pembroke, North Carolina	March 8 – 10	3196 Team SPORK, 8727 Glitch 2.0, 2640 HOTBOTZ
CHS District Portsmouth Event	Portsmouth, Virginia	March 8 – 10	422 The Mech Tech Dragons, 346 RoboHawks, 3359 Royal Robotics
FIT District Plano Event	Plano, Texas	March 8 – 10	148 Robowranglers, 9128 ITKAN Robotics, 9786 MHS Wolfpack
PNW District Auburn Event	Auburn, Washington	March 8 – 10	3070 Team Pronto 3070, 3663 CPR - Cedar Park Robotics, 5295 Aldernating Current

=== Week 3 ===
Event	Location	Date	Champions
ISR District Event #3	Hadera, Haifa District, Israel	March 10 – 12	1690 Orbit, 3339 BumbleB, 4416 Skynet
ISR District Event #4	Hadera, Haifa District, Israel	March 12 – 14	5554 The Poros Robotics, 1937 Elysium, 5928 MetalBoost
Arizona Valley Regional	Scottsdale, Arizona	March 13 – 16	3128 The Aluminum Narwhals, 6036 Peninsula Robotics, 9501 Sidereal Envoy
Tallahassee Regional	Tallahassee, Florida	March 13 – 16	118 Robonauts, 180 S.P.A.M., 7111 RAD Robotics, 5872 WiredCats
Central Illinois Regional	Peoria, Illinois	March 13 – 16	2481 Roboteers, 1756 Argos, 6317 Disruptive Innovation
Heartland Regional	Shawnee, Kansas	March 13 – 16	3061 Huskie Robotics, 7421 PrepaTec - OVERTURE, 3184 Blaze Robotics
Magnolia Regional	Laurel, Mississippi	March 13 – 16	8044 Denham Venom, 2992 The S.S. Prometheus, 1912 Team Combustion
Finger Lakes Regional	Rochester, New York	March 13 – 16	27 Team RUSH, 1591 Greece Gladiators, 578 R-Cubed - Red Raider Robotics
Regional Hermosillo	Hermosillo, Sonora, Mexico	March 13 – 16	6647 PrepaTec - VOLTEC Robotics, 7102 PrepaTec - Daedalus, 9282 PrepaTec - SINAVOLT
Sacramento Regional	Elk Grove, California	March 13 – 16	604 Quixilver, 254 The Cheesy Poofs, 4135 Iron Patriots
FIT District Fort Worth Event	Fort Worth, Texas	March 14 – 16	2468 Team Appreciate, 3005 RoboChargers, 7540 Timberwolf Robotics
FIT District San Antonio Event	San Antonio, Texas	March 14 – 16	1477 Texas Torque, 624 CRyptonite, 5103 Jaegernauts
FIM District Wayne State Event	Detroit, Michigan	March 14 – 16	7769 The CREW, 1701 Robocubs, 9618 Tronarchs
FIM District LSSU Event	Sault Ste. Marie, Michigan	March 14 – 16	4391 BraveBots, 4967 That ONE Team-OurNextEngineers, 5878 The Great Lakers
FIM District Muskegon Event	Muskegon, Michigan	March 14 – 16	1025 Impi Warriors, 3538 RoboJackets, 7256 Irish Robotics
FIM District Traverse City Event	Traverse City, Michigan	March 14 – 16	1711 RAPTORS, 3767 TC Titans, 3770 BlitzCreek
NE District URI Event	South Kingstown, Rhode Island	March 14 – 16	8085 MOJO, 1768 Nashoba Robotics, 3719 STEM Whalers
PNW District SunDome Event	Yakima, Washington	March 14 – 16	2811 StormBots, 6443 AEMBOT, 3876 Mabton LugNutz
Los Angeles Regional	El Segundo, California	March 14 – 17	368 Team Kika Mana, 9408 Warbots, 980 ThunderBots
Wisconsin Regional	Milwaukee, Wisconsin	March 14 – 17	1732 Hilltopper Robotics, 930 Mukwonago BEARs, 4786 Nicolet FEAR
Southern Cross Regional	Windsor, New South Wales, Australia	March 15 – 17	4613 Barker Redbacks, 8011 Guangzhou Wayi, 5985 Project Bucephalus
NE District North Shore Event	Reading, Massachusetts	March 15 – 17	6328 Mechanical Advantage, 3467 Windham Windup, 1474 Titans
NE District Pine Tree Event	Lewiston, Maine	March 15 – 17	6329 The Bucks' Wrath, 5687 The Outliers, 9732 The Rainbow Junkyard
FMA District Montgomery Event	Skillman, New Jersey	March 15 – 17	1403 Team 1403 Cougar Robotics, 3637 The Daleks, 102 The Gearheads
ONT District Georgian Event	Barrie, Ontario, Canada	March 15 – 17	4907 Thunderstamps, 3683 Team DAVE, 5031 Full Metal Mustangs
ONT District Durham College Event	Oshawa, Ontario, Canada	March 15 – 17	1241 THEORY6, 1285 The Biggest Birds, 9621 Payload
PCH District Gwinnett Event	Lawrenceville, Georgia	March 15 – 17	1771 North Gwinnett Robotics, 1261 Robo Lions, 8577 Georgia Cyber Academy Champions
FIN District Columbus Event	Columbus, Indiana	March 15 – 17	4272 Maverick Robotics, 45 TechnoKats Robotics Team, 8430 The Hatch Batch
CHS District Severn Event	Severn, Maryland	March 15 – 17	9072 TigerBots, 686 Bovine Intervention, 1111 Power Hawks Robotics
FIM District Ann Arbor Event	Ann Arbor, Michigan	March 15 – 17	67 The HOT Team, 4362 CSPA Gems, 7660 The Byting Irish
FNC District UNC Asheville Event	Asheville, North Carolina	March 15 – 17	8727 Glitch 2.0, 9496 LYNK, 9297 BOGOBOTS
FMA District Springside Chestnut Hill Event	Philadelphia, Pennsylvania	March 15 – 17	2539 Krypton Cougars, 341 Miss Daisy, 5407 Wolfpack Robotics
CHS District Glen Allen Event	Glen Allen, Virginia	March 15 – 17	346 RoboHawks, 5804 TORCH, 4821 CyberUs
PNW District Bonney Lake Event	Bonney Lake, Washington	March 15 – 17	2046 Bear Metal, 2910 Jack in the Bot, 6350 Clawbots, 5683 R.A.V.E.N.

=== Week 4 ===
Event	Location	Date	Champions
ONT District Humber College Event	Toronto, Ontario, Canada	March 18 – 20	3161 Tronic Titans, 4920 Belle River Boltheads, 6140 SMT Titans - The 'Tita'BOTS
Haliç Regional	Istanbul, Istanbul Province, Turkey	March 19 – 21	8214 Cyber Unicorn, 9609 Paraducks, 9523 Archers
FIRST Israel District Championship	Jerusalem	March 19 – 21	1690 Orbit, 3339 BumbleB, 5715 DRC
Arizona East Regional	Tempe, Arizona	March 20 – 23	670 Homestead Robotics, 498 The Cobra Commanders, 2375 Dragon Robotics
Orlando Regional	Orlando, Florida	March 20 – 23	59 RamTech, 179 Children of the Swamp, 8817 Buccaneer Robotics
Iowa Regional	Cedar Falls, Iowa	March 20 – 23	4143 MARS/WARS, 4607 C.I.S., 7848 WI-Fighterz
Idaho Regional	Nampa, Idaho	March 20 – 23	2122 Team Tators, 192 GRT, 1891 Bullbots
St. Louis Regional	St. Louis, Missouri	March 20 – 23	1706 Ratchet Rockers, 1756 Argos, 1288 RAVEN Robotics
New York Tech Valley Regional	Albany, New York	March 20 – 23	1796 RoboTigers, 1591 Greece Gladiators, 3181 Pittsford Panthers
Buckeye Regional	Cleveland, Ohio	March 20 – 23	3015 Ranger Robotics, 1787 The Flying Circuits, 2172 Steel Unit-E
FIRST Long Island Regional	Hempstead, New York	March 20 – 23	9016 Syosset SuperSonics, 353 POBots, 2875 CyberHawks
Colorado Regional	Denver, Colorado	March 20 – 23	3006 Red Rock Robotics, 1339 AngelBotics, 1108 Panther Robotics
Regional Laguna	Torreón, Coahuila, Mexico	March 20 – 23	4400 Cerbotics - Peñoles, 4635 PrepaTec - Botbusters, 3480 PrepaTec - ABTOMAT
PCH District Carrollton Event	Carrollton, Georgia	March 21 – 23	2974 Walton Robotics, 7451 AvengerRobotics, 8865 Dacula Droids
ONT District University of Waterloo Event	Waterloo, Ontario, Canada	March 21 – 23	4476 W.A.F.F.L.E.S., 5024 Raider Robotics, 9659 Vanier Vikings
PCH District Charleston Event	North Charleston, South Carolina	March 21 – 23	1102 M'Aiken Magic, 343 Metal-In-Motion, 1319 Flash
FIM District Lansing Event	Mason, Michigan	March 21 – 23	3655 Tractor Technicians, 8608 Alpha Bots, 5641 Byron Robotics
FIM District Midland Event	Midland, Michigan	March 21 – 23	5712 Hemlock's Gray Matter, 5114 Titanium Tigers, 5229 Heritage Hawkbots
FIM District West Michigan Event	Allendale Charter Township, Michigan	March 21 – 23	6090 Wayland Wildcats, 5675 WiredCats, 244 RoboDawgs 3D
FIT District Dallas Event	Dallas, Texas	March 21 – 23	148 Robowranglers, 6672 Fusion Corps, 8858 Beast from the East
PNW District Wilsonville Event	Wilsonville, Oregon	March 21 – 23	2521 SERT, 1540 Flaming Chickens, 6465 Mystic Biscuit
Central Valley Regional	Fresno, California	March 21 – 24	1323 MadTown Robotics, 5940 BREAD, 7589 Lishan Blue Magpie, 8840 Bay Robotics
San Diego Regional	San Diego, California	March 21 – 24	359 Hawaiian Kids, 3647 Millennium Falcons, 8891 Wild Raccoons
Marmara Regional	Istanbul, Istanbul Province, Turkey	March 22 – 24	9483 İstanbul Wildcats, 6459 AG Robotik, 9694 TUBITECH
NE District Greater Boston Event	Revere, Massachusetts	March 22 – 24	125 NUTRONs, 3467 Windham Windup, 2423 The KwarQs, 4311 Swampscott Currents
NE District Western NE Event	Springfield, Massachusetts	March 22 – 24	177 Bobcat Robotics, 176 Aces High, 173 RAGE Robotics ⚙️
FMA District Warren Hills Event	Washington, New Jersey	March 22 – 24	4573 Rambotics, 4285 Camo-Bots, 4652 Ironmen 2
ONT District North Bay Event	North Bay, Ontario, Canada	March 22 – 24	865 WARP7, 4039 MakeShift Robotics, 8731 Wild WYRE
FMA District Bensalem Event	Bensalem, Pennsylvania	March 22 – 24	5895 Peddie Robotics, 103 Cybersonics, 484 Roboforce
FIT District Houston Event	Houston, Texas	March 22 – 24	118 Robonauts, 5414 Pearadox, 6180 Mechanical Lions, 1255 Blarglefish
FIN District Plainfield Event	Plainfield, Indiana	March 22 – 24	868 TechHOUNDS, 3404 The Quadrangles, 135 Penn Robotics Black Knights
CHS District Owings Mills Event	Owings Mills, Maryland	March 22 – 24	1727 REX, 449 The Blair Robot Project, 1719 The Umbrella Corporation, 2914 TIGER PRIDE
FIM District Livonia Event	Livonia, Michigan	March 22 – 24	7174 Charger Robotics, 5907 CC Shambots, 6152 Robo-Falcons
FIM District Troy Event #1	Troy, Michigan	March 22 – 24	27 Team RUSH, 910 The Foley Freeze, 2960 Automation Nation
FNC District Mecklenburg County Event	Charlotte, North Carolina	March 22 – 24	9496 LYNK, 6894 Iced Java, 9298 Greeni3s
FNC District Wake County Event	Durham, North Carolina	March 22 – 24	4828 RoboEagles, 4561 TerrorBytes, 8304 Robot MaSTrs
CHS District Falls Church Event	Falls Church, Virginia	March 22 – 24	2363 Triple Helix Robotics, 1731 Fresta Valley Robotics Club, 2421 RTR Team Robotics
PNW District Sammamish Event	Bellevue, Washington	March 22 – 24	2046 Bear Metal, 1294 Pack of Parts, 9023 Future Martians

=== Week 5 ===
Event	Location	Date	Champions
Las Vegas Regional	Las Vegas, Nevada	March 27 – 30	4414 HighTide, 987 HIGHROLLERS, 4501 Humans, 3009 High Scalers
Midwest Regional	Chicago, Illinois	March 27 – 30	2338 Gear It Forward, 359 Hawaiian Kids, 4655 Stateline Robotics
Monterey Bay Regional	Seaside, California	March 27 – 30	1323 MadTown Robotics, 604 Quixilver, 2035 Rockin' Bots
Orange County Regional	Costa Mesa, California	March 27 – 30	7157 μBotics, 3476 Code Orange, 5285 Sea Kings Robotics
NE District UNH Event	Durham, New Hampshire	March 28 – 30	133 B.E.R.T., 172 Northern Force, 1350 The Rambots
ONT District McMaster University Event	Hamilton, Ontario, Canada	March 28 – 30	2056 OP Robotics, 2200 MMRambotics, 7509 Brainstorm Robotics
ONT District Windsor Essex Great Lakes Event	Windsor, Ontario, Canada	March 28 – 30	4678 CyberCavs, 4946 The Alpha Dogs, 5870 League of Logic
FIT District Amarillo Event	Amarillo, Texas	March 28 – 30	4206 Robo Vikes, 4063 TriKzR4Kidz, 7088 Somerset Robodogs
FIT District Space City @ Friendswood Event	Friendswood, Texas	March 28 – 30	118 Robonauts, 5892 Energy HEROs, 9081 Bluetonium
PCH District Albany Event	Albany, Georgia	March 28 – 30	1771 North Gwinnett Robotics, 1261 Robo Lions, 5074 RoboMustangs, 7104 Benedictine Military School Bot Brothers
FIM District Renaissance Event	Detroit, Michigan	March 28 – 30	862 Lightning Robotics, 4130 The Blue Devils, 2673 Tenacious Technicians
FIM District Kentwood Event	Grand Rapids, Michigan	March 28 – 30	2075 Enigma Robotics, 2054 Tech Vikes, 8285 Bionic Bulldogs, 7911 Scrapcat Robotics
FIM District Macomb Community College Event	Warren, Michigan	March 28 – 30	818 The Steel Armadillos, 1023 Bedford Express, 7762 AutoPilots
FIM District Central Michigan University Event	Mount Pleasant, Michigan	March 28 – 30	5505 V2 - Volts Squared, 2337 EngiNERDS, 9215 T-Town Tech
FIM District Troy Event #2	Troy, Michigan	March 28 – 30	494 Martians, 7769 The CREW, 9242 Hamady Hawks
FIN District Washington Event	Washington, Indiana	March 28 – 30	868 TechHOUNDS, 234 Cyber Blue, 3947 The Last Crusaders
NE District WPI Event	Worcester, Massachusetts	March 29 – 31	4048 Redshift, 1768 Nashoba Robotics, 5962 perSEVERE

=== Week 6 ===
Event	Location	Date	Champions
Rocket City Regional	Huntsville, Alabama	April 3 – 6	4635 PrepaTec - Botbusters, 2481 Roboteers, 5002 Dragon Robotics
Aerospace Valley Regional	Lancaster, California	April 3 – 6	294 Beach Cities Robotics, 2659 RoboWarriors, 4322 Clockwork
Bayou Regional	Kenner, Louisiana	April 3 – 6	3478 PrepaTec - LamBot, 4738 Patribots, 1912 Team Combustion
Greater Kansas City Regional	Lee's Summit, Missouri	April 3 – 6	4766 Team SCREAM Jr., 5809 The Jesubots, 5126 Electromagnetic Panthers
New England FIRST District Championship	West Springfield, Massachusetts	April 3 – 6	8013 Boston Lions, 195 CyberKnights, 5112 The Gongoliers
Oklahoma Regional	Oklahoma City, Oklahoma	April 3 – 6	2122 Team Tators, 9401 Midas' Mayhem, 2373 The Crickets
FIRST Ontario Provincial Championship	Mississauga, Ontario, Canada	April 3 – 6	2056 OP Robotics, 4678 CyberCavs, 9785 Alectrona
Pacific Northwest FIRST District Championship	Portland, Oregon	April 3 – 6	1318 Issaquah Robotics Society, 1540 Flaming Chickens, 6443 AEMBOT
FIRST in Texas Texas District Championship	Houston, Texas	April 3 – 6	3005 RoboChargers, 118 Robonauts, 5892 Energy HEROs
Seven Rivers Regional	La Crosse, Wisconsin	April 3 – 6	7021 TC Robotics, 2129 Ultraviolet, 9576 Loretto Lightning
Miami Valley Regional	Cincinnati, Ohio	April 3 – 6	4028 The Beak Squad, 2614 Mountaineer Area RoboticS, 424 Rust Belt Robotics
Minnesota 10,000 Lakes Regional	Saint Paul, Minnesota	April 3 – 6	2530 Inconceivable, 2052 KnightKrawler, 3018 Nordic Storm
Hawaii Regional	Honolulu, Hawaii	April 3 – 6	359 Hawaiian Kids, 368 Team Kika Mana, 2348 Mechahunes
Peachtree District Championship	Macon, Georgia	April 3 – 6	1771 North Gwinnett Robotics, 2974 Walton Robotics, 8575The Due Westerners
FIRST Mid-Atlantic District Championship	Bethlehem, Pennsylvania	April 4 – 6	1640 Sab-BOT-age, 5895 Peddie Robotics, 4285 Camo-Bots
FIRST in Michigan State Championship	University Center, Michigan	April 4 – 6	5712 Hemlock's Gray Matter, 27 Team RUSH, 51 Wings of Fire
Minnesota Granite City Regional	St. Cloud, Minnesota	April 3 – 6	3276 TOOLCATS, 7028 Binary Battalion, 6045 Sabre Robotics
New York City Regional	New York, New York	April 4 – 7	1796 RoboTigers, 3950 RoboGym Robotics, 369 High Voltage Robotics
FIRST Chesapeake District Championship	Petersburg, Virginia	April 4 – 7	836 The RoboBees, 1731 Fresta Valley Robotics Club, 539 Titan Robotics
East Bay Regional	Berkeley, California	April 4 – 7	254 The Cheesy Poofs, 1678 Citrus Circuits, 1160 Titanium Robotics
FIRST Indiana District Championship	Lafayette, Indiana	April 5 – 7	1501 Team THRUST, 7457 suPURDUEper Robotics, 1747 Harrison Boiler Robotics
FIRST North Carolina District Championship	Greenville, North Carolina	April 5 – 7	9496 LYNK, 4795 Eastbots, 1533 Triple Strange, 6639 The Mechanical Minds

=== FIRST Championship ===
Event	Location	Date
FIRST Championship	Houston, Texas	April 17 – 20

== FIRST Championship Results ==
The following tables show the winners of each division and the divisional playoff results.

=== Division Winners ===
Division	Captain	1st Pick	2nd Pick	3rd Pick
Archimedes	4613	1678	4206	2718
Newton	254	1323	294	1189
Galileo	2056	987	1577	7558
Hopper	6328	4481	9072	2370
Curie	2590	4476	7028	190
Milstein	604	9483	1058	78
Daly	1690	4522	9432	321
Johnson	5813	1477	3061	2582

=== Divisional Playoff ===
==== Elimination Bracket ====
As with all other events this season, the Championship divisional playoff follows a double elimination format. All matchups are best-of-one with the exception of Einstein Finals, which is a best-of-three series.

Upper round 1	Upper round 2	Upper final	Einstein Finals
Archimedes	108
Newton	148
Newton	130
Hopper	127
Galileo	152
Hopper	165
Newton	97
Daly	91
Curie	138
Milstein	148
Milstein	71
Daly	105
Daly	126
Johnson	95	Newton	0 match wins
Daly	2 match wins
Lower round 1	Lower round 2	Lower round 3	Lower final
Milstein	153
Archimedes	180	Archimedes	192	Daly	129
Galileo	131	Archimedes	178	Archimedes	109
Hopper	155
Hopper	125
Curie	141	Curie	119
Johnson	140

==== Einstein Finals ====
Division	Final 1	Final 2	Wins
Newton	99	120	0
Daly	119	123	2
