= Reefscape =

2025 FIRST Robotics Competition game

- Year: 2025

Season Information
- Number of teams: 3,754
- Number of regionals: 69
- Number of district events: 125
- Championship location: Houston; George R. Brown Convention Center

FIRST Championship Awards
- Impact Award winner: 5985 - "Project Bucephalus"
- Champions: 2910 - "Jack in the Bot" 1323 - "MadTown Robotics" 5026 - "Iron Panthers" 4272 - "Maverick Robotics"

Reefscape, stylized as R≡≡FSCAPE and officially known as Reefscape presented by Haas for sponsorship reasons, was the FIRST Robotics Competition game for the 2025 season. The game is themed around exploring a coral reef as part of the FIRST-wide FIRST Dive season, which focuses on ocean exploration and conservation. Kickoff took place on January 4, 2025, and was broadcast on YouTube, including at local kickoff events featuring multiple teams.

The game is inspired by a concept submitted to the 2021 Game Design Challenge by Team 1318 - "Issaquah Robotics Society". Game play centers around robots scoring PVC pipes (called Coral) and playground balls (called Algae) into goals on their side of the field. At the end of the match, robots move to a truss structure called the Barge and climb metal Cages to earn additional points.

== Field and Scoring ==
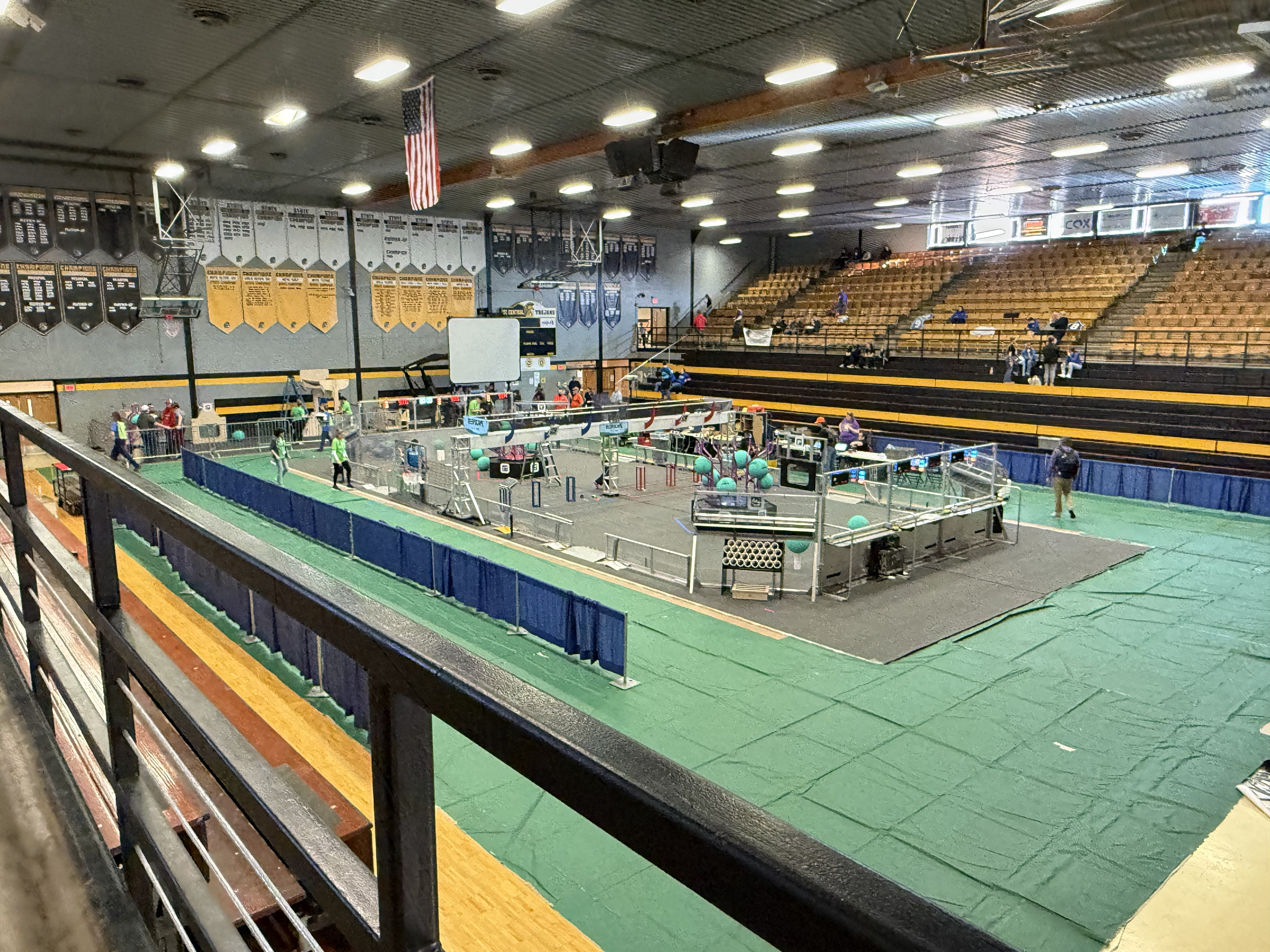
Playing field set up in the gymnasium of Traverse City Central High School, Traverse City, Michigan.

Reefscape is played on a 27 feet (8.2 m) by 54 feet (16 m) field covered in grey carpet. The field is surrounded by low polycarbonate walls on the long sides and taller alliance station walls on the short sides. The two Algae Processors on the long sides are also protected by a wall made of plastic mesh.

The field is divided in half by the Barge truss, with each half including an alliance's Reef and Processor. The Barge includes each alliance's Net and six Cages, three for each alliance. Alliances work to score Coral on their Reef, located at the center of their side of the field. Alliances can also score by retrieving Algae from their Reef and scoring them on their Barge. Algae can also be scored in the Processor for the opposing alliance's human player to place in the Barge.

=== Game Pieces ===
There are two game pieces in Reefscape: Coral and Algae. Coral are 4 inches (100 mm) diameter COTS PVC pipes with a length of 11.875 inches (301.6 mm). Algae are custom-produced green rubber playground balls with a diameter of 16 inches (410 mm). Robots can carry a maximum of one of each game piece at a time during a match.

=== Player Areas ===
==== Alliance Stations ====
There are two alliance stations on the short sides of the field, one for each alliance. Each station is divided into three smaller driver's stations where the teams that make up the alliance control their robots. In addition to the standard e-stop button, each driver's station includes an autonomous stop (a-stop) that can be used to stop a robot during the autonomous period. Once the autonomous period ends, the a-stop expires and returns control of the robot to the team.

==== Human Player Stations ====
The only type of human player station in Reefscape in the Coral Station. The four stations (two per alliance) are located at the corners of the field and are used to introduce Coral into the field. Robots can navigate to the stations using an AprilTag mounted at the top middle of each station. Additionally, while the Processors are not fully classified as human player stations, human players can be stationed at them to score processed Algae into the Nets.

=== Scoring Areas ===
==== Reefs ====
The two Reefs (one per alliance) are hexagonal structures located at the center of their alliance's side of the field, 12 feet (3.7 m) from the alliance station wall. Each Reef has 12 vertical pipes extending 6 feet (1.8 m) from the field carpet with three sets of Branches where Coral can be scored. Coral can also be scored in six slanted troughs located at the base of each Reef.

The first set of Branches extends to 2.875 feet (0.876 m) above the carpet and are angled up at 35 degrees. The second and third sets extend to 3.969 feet (1.210 m) and 6 feet (1.8 m) respectively, with the second set angled up at 35 degrees and the third set vertical to the carpet.

==== Barge ====
The Barge is a metal truss structure that supports the two Nets and six Cages. It is 29.17 feet (8.89 m) wide, 3.67 feet (1.12 m) deep, and 8.42 feet (2.57 m) tall and is supported by two legs just outside of the field wall. The truss structure that supports the Nets is 5.17 feet (1.58 m) above the field carpet.

===== Nets =====
The two Nets (one per alliance) are suspended from the top of the Barge and are made of knit polyester mesh with a sewn cord border. Each Net is 4 feet (1.2 m) wide by 12 feet (3.7 m) long and is suspended so the lowest point is 6.34 feet (1.93 m) above the field carpet.

===== Cages =====
The six Cages (three per alliance) are 2 feet (0.61 m) ft tall by 7.38 inches (187 mm) wide rectangular structures made of welded metal. The Cages are hung from the Barge truss by metal chains in two different positions based on the strategy of each alliance. The deep position is the default and is 3.5 inches (89 mm) from the field carpet. On the other hand, the shallow position is 2.45 feet (0.75 m) from the carpet. The Cages are left in their existing position following each match unless an alliance requests changes to the positions of their Cages.

==== Processors ====
The two Processors (one per alliance) are integrated into the long sides of the field wall near the legs of the Barge truss. Algae scored into an alliance's Processor can be scored into the opposing alliance's Net by that alliance's human player.

== Events ==
The 2025 regular season is divided into six weeks, with many events occurring simultaneously during each week. After the end of the regular season, teams that have qualified compete in the FIRST Championship in Houston.

Starting this season, regional teams will qualify using a modified version of the existing district points model. While some teams will still qualify at individual events, others will qualify on a weekly basis starting Week 2 via a pool of all non-qualified regional teams ranked by number of points.

=== Week 1 ===
Event	Location	Date	Winners
FIRST Israel (ISR) District Event #1	Hadera, Haifa District, Israel	February 23–25	5614, 1690, 5928
FIRST Israel (ISR) District Event #2	Hadera, Haifa District, Israel	February 25–27	5614, 2231, 4586, 1576
Canadian Pacific Regional	Vancouver, British Columbia, Canada	February 26 – March 1	359, 4270, 8339
Orange County Regional	Costa Mesa, California	February 26 – March 1	4415, 6995, 8871
Lake Superior Regional	Duluth, Minnesota	February 26 – March 1	2847, 6147, 6574
Northern Lights Regional	Duluth, Minnesota	February 26 – March 1	111, 2240, 5253, 4360
Regional Monterrey	Monterrey, Nuevo León, Mexico	February 26 – March 1	4635, 4403, 9301
FIRST In Michigan (FIM) District Kettering University Event #1	Flint, Michigan	February 27 – March 1	5460, 2137, 4998
FIRST In Michigan (FIM) District Milford Event	Highland, Michigan	February 27 – March 1	3656, 67, 6344
Pacific Northwest (PNW) District Oregon State Fair Event	Salem, Oregon	February 27 – March 1	955, 3674, 2550
FIRST In Texas (FIT) District Waco Event	Waco, Texas	February 27 – March 1	148, 3005, 8732
Pinnacles Regional	Hollister, California	February 27 – March 2	1678, 604, 3257
Hueneme Port Regional	Port Hueneme, California	February 27 – March 2	4414, 3255, 9599
Peachtree (PCH) District Gainesville Event	Gainesville, Georgia	February 28 – March 2	9496, 8866, 4240, 9522
FIRST Indiana Robotics (FIN) District Mishawaka Event	Mishawaka, Indiana	February 28 – March 2	7457, 1501, 10332
New England (NE) District Southern Maine Event	Falmouth, Maine	February 28 – March 2	6329, 190, 4564
FIRST In Michigan (FIM) District Battle Creek Event	Battle Creek, Michigan	February 28 – March 2	8608, 6002, 4453
FIRST In Michigan (FIM) District Ferndale Event	Ferndale, Michigan	February 28 – March 2	33, 3538, 1250
FIRST In Michigan (FIM) District Lake City Event	Lake City, Michigan	February 28 – March 2	3572, 1481, 3537
New England (NE) District Granite State Event	Salem, New Hampshire	February 28 – March 2	3467, 6328, 9443
Ontario (ONT) District Newmarket Event	Newmarket, Ontario, Canada	February 28 – March 2	4946, 5409, 10015
FIRST Mid-Atlantic (FMA) District Hatboro-Horsham Event	Horsham, Pennsylvania	February 28 – March 2	2539, 341, 2559
FIRST In Texas (FIT) District Tomball Event	Tomball, Texas	February 28 – March 2	118, 6800, 5417, 8392
FIRST Chesapeake (CHS) District Glen Allen VA Event	Glen Allen, Virginia	February 28 – March 2	1731, 449, 4505, 10370
Pacific Northwest (PNW) District Glacier Peak Event	Snohomish, Washington	February 28 – March 2	1778, 2046, 3826

=== Week 2 ===
Event	Location	Date	Winners
İstanbul Regional	Bakırköy, Istanbul, Türkiye	March 4–6	7539, 9609, 10337
Bosphorus Regional	Bakırköy, Istanbul, Türkiye	March 4–6	9483, 8159, 10598
Arkansas Regional	Searcy, Arkansas	March 5–8	2481, 118, 7483
Central Missouri Regional	Sedalia, Missouri	March 5–8	1756, 4522, 5968
Hudson Valley Regional	Suffern, New York	March 5–8	694, 1796, 5298
Festival de Robotique Regional	Saint-Laurent, Quebec, Canada	March 5–8	3015, 3990, 3544
Peachtree (PCH) District Dalton Event	Dalton, Georgia	March 6–8	6919, 2974, 10376
FIRST In Michigan (FIM) District Kettering University Event #2	Flint, Michigan	March 6–8	2337, 2832, 9251
FIRST In Michigan (FIM) District St. Joseph Event	St. Joseph, Michigan	March 6–8	2767, 3620, 7210, 6588
Ontario (ONT) District Centennial College Event	Scarborough, Ontario, Canada	March 6–8	7558, 188, 6135
Pacific Northwest (PNW) District Clackamas Academy Event	Oregon City, Oregon	March 6–8	3636, 3663, 3574
FIRST South Carolina (FSC) District Hartsville Event	Hartsville, South Carolina	March 6–8	343, 4451, 8137
FIRST In Texas (FIT) District Belton Event	Belton, Texas	March 6–8	6369, 3847, 10518
Southern Cross Regional	Cambridge Park, New South Wales, Australia	March 6–9	4613, 5584, 6083
Ventura County Regional	Port Hueneme, California	March 6–9	4481, 4414, 5805
New Taipei City Regional	New Taipei City, Taiwan	March 6–9	9126, 8613, 8169
New England (NE) District Waterbury Event	Waterbury, Connecticut	March 7–9	7407, 176, 1991
New England (NE) District Greater Boston Event	Revere, Massachusetts	March 7–9	125, 5813, 175
FIRST Chesapeake (CHS) District Pasadena MD Event	Pasadena, Maryland	March 7–9	9072, 1629, 8326, 7770
FIRST In Michigan (FIM) District Escanaba Event	Escanaba, Michigan	March 7–9	4391, 10589, 1322
FIRST In Michigan (FIM) District Mt. Pleasant Event	Mt. Pleasant, Michigan	March 7–9	3536, 5216, 6033
FIRST North Carolina (FNC) District Catawba County Event	Hickory, North Carolina	March 7–9	4795, 587, 9298
FIRST Mid-Atlantic (FMA) District Mount Olive Event	Flanders, New Jersey	March 7–9	11, 8513, 430
FIRST Mid-Atlantic (FMA) District Seneca Event	Tabernacle, New Jersey	March 7–9	5895, 1807, 9416
Ontario (ONT) District Niagara College Event	Welland, Ontario, Canada	March 7–9	2056, 3683, 7623
Haliç Regional	Bakırköy, Istanbul, Türkiye	March 7–9	7539, 10541, 7050
Marmara Regional	Bakırköy, Istanbul, Türkiye	March 7–9	9609, 8159, 6038, 10502
FIRST In Texas (FIT) District Plano Event	Plano, Texas	March 7–9	5411, 9105, 8816, 6526
FIRST Chesapeake (CHS) District Portsmouth VA Event	Portsmouth, Virginia	March 7–9	422, 346, 3072, 6882
Pacific Northwest (PNW) District Sammamish Event	Bellevue, Washington	March 7–9	2910, 9442, 2906, 6350
FIRST Israel (ISR) District Event #3	Hadera, Haifa District, Israel	March 8–10	1690, 5990, 5135

=== Week 3 ===
Event	Location	Date	Winners
FIRST Israel (ISR) District Event #4	Hadera, Haifa District, Israel	March 10–12	2231, 2630, 9740
Rocket City Regional	Huntsville, Alabama	March 12–15	2338, 4020, 10011
Arizona North Regional	Flagstaff, Arizona	March 12–15	359, 9432, 7645
Regional Brazil - Brasilia	Brasília, Federal District, Brazil	March 12–15	7563, 9199, 5800
St. Louis Regional	St. Louis, Missouri	March 12–15	27, 1706, 1329
Magnolia Regional	Laurel, Mississippi	March 12–15	456, 2992, 3753
Regional Leon	Leon, Guanajuato, Mexico	March 12–15	3478, 4400, 4782
Great Northern Regional	Grand Forks, North Dakota	March 12–15	3276, 876, 7530
Finger Lakes Regional	Rochester, New York	March 12–15	340, 4611, 6911
Utah Regional	West Valley City, Utah	March 12–15	987, 7426, 3166
FIRST In Michigan (FIM) District Belleville Event	Belleville, Michigan	March 13–15	862, 7769, 66
FIRST In Michigan (FIM) District Wayne State Event	Detroit, Michigan	March 13–15	8352, 4680, 3632
FIRST In Michigan (FIM) District Muskegon Event	Muskegon, Michigan	March 13–15	3572, 3538, 10654
FIRST In Michigan (FIM) District Traverse City Event	Traverse City, Michigan	March 13–15	7790, 3767, 7598, 5560
New England (NE) District URI Event	Kingston, Rhode Island	March 13–15	190, 1768, 5962
FIRST In Texas (FIT) District San Antonio Event	San Antonio, Texas	March 13–15	2582, 5572, 6974
Pacific Northwest (PNW) District SunDome Event	Yakima, Washington	March 13–15	9450, 2930, 4125, 749
Los Angeles Regional	El Segundo, California	March 13–16	9408, 1197, 5124
Silicon Valley Regional	Woodside, California	March 13–16	1323, 5940, 649
Shanghai Regional	Shanghai, China	March 13–16	6941, 5449, 10120
Tallahassee Regional	Tallahassee, Florida	March 13–16	386, 1902, 5276, 6184
Peachtree (PCH) District Gwinnett Event	Lawrenceville, Georgia	March 14–16	1771, 1833, 4468
FIRST Indiana Robotics (FIN) District Kokomo Event	Russiaville, Indiana	March 14–16	1501, 868, 8103
New England (NE) District Western NE Event	Springfield, Massachusetts	March 14–16	195, 176, 9710
FIRST Chesapeake (CHS) District Bethesda MD Event	Bethesda, Maryland	March 14–16	1731, 8590, 2867
FIRST Chesapeake (CHS) District Severn MD Event	Severn, Maryland	March 14–16	449, 2106, 3793
New England (NE) District Pine Tree Event	Lewiston, Maine	March 14–16	6329, 5687, 501
FIRST In Michigan (FIM) District Berrien Springs Event	Berrien Springs, Michigan	March 14–16	6002, 4237, 288
FIRST In Michigan (FIM) District Jackson at Columbia Event	Brooklyn, Michigan	March 14–16	3668, 7197, 5559
FIRST North Carolina (FNC) District UNC Asheville Event	Asheville, North Carolina	March 14–16	9496, 8866, 10248
FIRST North Carolina (FNC) District Wake County Event	Rolesville, North Carolina	March 14–16	2059, 9032, 5190
FIRST Mid-Atlantic (FMA) District Robbinsville Event	Trenton, New Jersey	March 14–16	2590, 1923, 5624
Ontario (ONT) District Durham College Event	Oshawa, Ontario, Canada	March 14–16	4476, 8884, 8731
FIRST Mid-Atlantic (FMA) District Springside Chestnut Hill Event	Philadelphia, Pennsylvania	March 14–16	2539, 341, 10143
Ankara Regional	Çankaya, Ankara, Türkiye	March 14–16	9029, 6436, 8777
FIRST In Texas (FIT) District Manor Event	Manor, Texas	March 14–16	118, 6800, 9137
Pacific Northwest (PNW) District Bonney Lake Event	Bonney Lake, Washington	March 14–16	2046, 1778, 9446
Sacramento Regional	Elk Grove, California	March 14–17	1678, 254, 7137
FIRST In Texas (FIT) District Victoria Event	Victoria, Texas	March 15–17	1477, 9128, 9515

=== Week 4 ===
Event	Location	Date	Winners
Ontario (ONT) District Humber Polytechnic Event	Etobicoke, Ontario, Canada	March 17–19	7558, 4976, 10279
Arizona East Regional	Tempe, Arizona	March 19–22	4415, 9432, 9704
Colorado Regional	Denver, Colorado	March 19–22	4499, 1619, 4501
Orlando Regional	Orlando, Florida	March 19–22	180, 179, 2152
Central Illinois Regional	Peoria, Illinois	March 19–22	2481, 1756, 2358
Heartland Regional	Shawnee, Kansas	March 19–22	7421, 1825, 5013
Regional Laguna	Torreón, Coahuila, Mexico	March 19–22	4400, 9134, 6483
FIRST Long Island Regional	Hempstead, New York	March 19–22	5736, 353, 564
Green Country Regional	Tulsa, Oklahoma	March 19–22	3937, 6424, 2341
Greater Pittsburgh Regional	Pittsburgh, Pennsylvania	March 19–22	694, 3539, 3492
Seven Rivers Regional	La Crosse, Wisconsin	March 19–22	4728, 3197, 8024
Peachtree (PCH) District Statesboro Event	Statesboro, Georgia	March 20–22	2974, 8866, 4701, 5219
FIRST In Michigan (FIM) District LSSU Event	Sault Ste. Marie, Michigan	March 20–22	4391, 4398, 4377
FIRST In Michigan (FIM) District West Michigan Event	Allendale, Michigan	March 20–22	2767, 862, 8397
Ontario (ONT) District University of Waterloo Event	Waterloo, Ontario, Canada	March 20–22	4678, 3683, 9263
FIRST South Carolina (FSC) District North Charleston Event	N. Charleston, South Carolina	March 20–22	2815, 4451, 7085
FIRST In Texas (FIT) District Fort Worth Event	Fort Worth, Texas	March 20–22	3005, 2714, 4717
FIRST In Texas (FIT) District Houston Event	Houston, Texas	March 20–22	118, 3847, 7691
Regional Brazil - São Paulo	Vila Leopoldina, São Paulo, Brazil	March 20–23	1156, 7563, 9175
San Diego Regional	La Jolla, California	March 20–23	1538, 3255, 8119
Hawaii Regional	Honolulu, Hawaii	March 20–23	4270, 359, 4817
San Francisco Regional	San Francisco, California	March 21–23	5940, 10523, 4255
FIRST Indiana Robotics (FIN) District Lafayette Event	Lafayette, Indiana	March 21–23	7457, 4272, 3487
New England (NE) District WPI Event	Worcester, Massachusetts	March 21–23	190, 1768, 3182
FIRST In Michigan (FIM) District Woodhaven Event	Brownstown Charter Township, Michigan	March 21–23	245, 3620, 6029
FIRST In Michigan (FIM) District Mason Event	Mason, Michigan	March 21–23	910, 4776, 4453
FIRST In Michigan (FIM) District Saline Event	Saline, Michigan	March 21–23	67, 5460, 5150
FIRST In Michigan (FIM) District Troy Event	Troy, Michigan	March 21–23	33, 9245, 4998, 10652
FIRST North Carolina (FNC) District Pitt County Event	Greenville, North Carolina	March 21–23	4561, 4534, 8205
FIRST North Carolina (FNC) District Mecklenburg County Event	Charlotte, North Carolina	March 21–23	9496, 8738, 9198
New England (NE) District UNH Event	Durham, New Hampshire	March 21–23	133, 2877, 5902
FIRST Mid-Atlantic (FMA) District Warren Hills Event	Washington, New Jersey	March 21–23	3142, 8513, 2180, 8707
Ontario (ONT) District North Bay Event	North Bay, Ontario, Canada	March 21–23	5409, 4152, 3756
Pacific Northwest (PNW) District Wilsonville Event	Wilsonville, Oregon	March 21–23	957, 5468, 9567
FIRST Mid-Atlantic (FMA) District Bensalem Event	Bensalem, Pennsylvania	March 21–23	365, 103, 8721
FIRST Chesapeake (CHS) District Alexandria VA Event	Alexandria, Virginia	March 21–23	620, 836, 6326
FIRST Chesapeake (CHS) District Blacksburg VA Event	Blacksburg, Virginia	March 21–23	422, 1629, 2890, 3361
Pacific Northwest (PNW) District Auburn Event	Auburn, Washington	March 21–23	2910, 3663, 8896

=== Week 5 ===
Event	Location	Date	Winners
FIRST Israel District Championship	Jerusalem	March 25–27	1690, 5990, 5654
Iowa Regional	Cedar Falls, Iowa	March 26–29	1706, 4646, 5914
Idaho Regional	Nampa, Idaho	March 26–29	359, 2122, 3859
Midwest Regional	Arlington Heights, Illinois	March 26–29	111, 2338, 8029
Minnesota 10,000 Lakes Regional	Falcon Heights, Minnesota	March 26–29	8570, 2491, 3891
Greater Kansas City Regional	Riverside, Missouri	March 26–29	1987, 5801, 3160
Las Vegas Regional	Las Vegas, Nevada	March 26–29	987, 4414, 60
New York Tech Valley Regional	Albany, New York	March 26–29	1796, 6621, 5528
Miami Valley Regional	Cincinnati, Ohio	March 26–29	4028, 340, 432
Peachtree (PCH) District Albany Event	Albany, Georgia	March 27–29	1771, 6919, 4459
FIRST Indiana Robotics (FIN) District Washington Event	Washington, Indiana	March 27–29	868, 1501, 10492
FIRST In Michigan (FIM) District Ferris State Event	Big Rapids, Michigan	March 27–29	494, 70, 9242
FIRST In Michigan (FIM) District Renaissance Event	Detroit, Michigan	March 27–29	2960, 6615, 9252
FIRST In Michigan (FIM) District Livonia Event	Livonia, Michigan	March 27–29	2337, 2832, 9618
FIRST In Michigan (FIM) District Macomb Event	Warren, Michigan	March 27–29	1718, 818, 7762
FIRST In Michigan (FIM) District Midland Event	Midland, Michigan	March 27–29	3175, 5166, 5538
Ontario (ONT) District Windsor Essex Great Lake Event	Windsor, Ontario, Canada	March 27–29	4678, 4907, 10611
FIRST In Texas (FIT) District Amarillo Event	Amarillo, Texas	March 27–29	6369, 9105, 9786
Phantom Lakes Regional	Mukwonago, Wisconsin	March 27–29	4635, 2530, 1220
Contra Costa Regional	Pittsburg, California	March 27–30	1678, 1323, 649, 6619
New England (NE) District Hartford Event	Hartford, Connecticut	March 28–30	7407, 195, 181
FIRST In Michigan (FIM) District Kentwood Event	Kentwood, Michigan	March 28–30	2075, 2054, 10654
FIRST North Carolina (FNC) District UNC Pembroke Event	Pembroke, North Carolina	March 28–30	2059, 900, 7443
FIRST Mid-Atlantic (FMA) District Montgomery Event	Skillman, New Jersey	March 28–30	5895, 75, 2458
Ontario (ONT) District McMaster University	Hamilton, Ontario, Canada	March 28–30	2056, 2200, 10167
FIRST Mid-Atlantic (FMA) District Centennial Event	Warminster, Pennsylvania	March 28–30	2607, 3314, 9416
FIRST In Texas (FIT) District Space City @ Friendswood Event	Friendswood, Texas	March 28–30	118, 324, 10385
New England (NE) District UVM Event	Burlington, Vermont	March 28–30	5687, 4909, 8544

=== Week 6 ===
Event	Location	Date	Winners
Aerospace Valley Regional	Lancaster, California	April 2–5	4415, 5199, 687
South Florida Regional	Coral Gables, Florida	April 2–5	180, 179, 5410
Peachtree District Championship	Macon, Georgia	April 2–5	1833, 1771, 3318
Bayou Regional	Kenner, Louisiana	April 2–5	8044, 16, 9787
Minnesota Granite City Regional	St. Cloud, Minnesota	April 2–5	3276, 4728, 6749
Minnesota North Star Regional	Minneapolis, Minnesota	April 2–5	2052, 3197, 4198
FIRST Mid-Atlantic District Championship	Bethlehem, Pennsylvania	April 2–5	2607, 3314, 11
New England FIRST District Championship	West Springfield, Massachusetts	April 2–5	6324, 7407, 839
Buckeye Regional	Cleveland, Ohio	April 2–5	1787, 695, 1559
Oklahoma Regional	Shawnee, Oklahoma	April 2–5	4522, 4068, 2341
FIRST Ontario Provincial Championship	Mississauga, Ontario, Canada	April 2–5	4678, 2056, 7902
Pacific Northwest FIRST District Championship	Cheney, Washington	April 2–5	2910, 2930, 7034
Smoky Mountains Regional	Sevierville, Tennessee	April 2–5	10479, 4467, 3843
FIRST In Texas District Championship	Houston, Texas	April 2–5	6800, 3005, 6357
FIRST Indiana State Championship	Greenwood, Indiana	April 3–5	7457, 868, 3487, 1747
FIRST In Michigan State Championship	University Center, Michigan	April 3–5	67, 2767, 5843
FIRST South Carolina State Championship	Anderson, South Carolina	April 3–5	4451, 343, 10231
East Bay Regional	Berkeley, California	April 3–6	254, 4270, 2204
Central Valley Regional	Fresno, California	April 3–6	3970, 973, 2035
FIRST Chesapeake District Championship	Upper Marlboro, Maryland	April 3–6	422, 449, 8590
New York City Regional	New York, New York	April 3–6	1796, 694, 6873
Wisconsin Regional	West Allis, Wisconsin	April 3–6	1732, 4786, 2830
FIRST North Carolina State Championship	Greensboro, North Carolina	April 4–6	9496, 900, 2724

==== FIRST Championship ====
Event	Location	Date	Winners
FIRST Championship	Houston, Texas	April 16–19	1323, 2910, 4272, 5026

== FIRST Championship Results ==
At the championship event, teams are randomly divided into 8 divisions, each named after a pioneer of STEM. The following table show the winners of each division, who moved on to compete in the Einstein Tournament.

=== Division Winners ===
Division	Captain	1st Pick	2nd Pick	3rd Pick
Archimedes	8044	2481	3940	4788
Curie	1771	3276	3478	166
Daly	2056	4613	6995	494
Galileo	4946	180	16	498
Hopper	1768	2767	2877	4145
Johnson	1690	4414	2073	5166
Milstein	118	5895	324	957
Newton	1323	2910	4272	5026

==== Einstein Tournament Bracket ====
As with all other events this season, the Championship playoff follows a double elimination format. All matchups are best-of-one with the exception of the Finals, which is a best-of-three series.

Upper round 1	Upper round 2	Upper final	Einstein Finals
Archimedes	223
Newton	297
Newton	284
Galileo	237
Galileo	237
Hopper	221
Newton	271
Johnson	288
Curie	251
Milstein	239
Curie	279
Johnson	293
Daly	269
Johnson	269	Johnson	1 match win
Newton	2 match wins
Lower round 1	Lower round 2	Lower round 3	Lower final
Curie	255
Archimedes	241	Hopper	139	Newton	301
Hopper	249	Curie	214	Daly	260
Daly	269
Galileo	263
Milstein	228	Daly	282
Daly	275

==== Einstein Finals ====
Division	Final 1	Final 2	Tiebreaker	Wins
Johnson	295	274	276	1
Newton	281	285	293	2
