= Beach Cities Robotics =

Robotics team from California, USA

FIRST Robotics Competition 294 - Beach Cities Robotics
- Team logo
- Full name: FIRST Robotics Team 294
- Nickname(s): 294, BCR
- Short name: BCR
- Founded: 1999
- Organization: Mira Costa High School; Redondo Union High School
- Events attended: Los Angeles; San Diego; Orange County
- Championships: 2
- First game: Double Trouble
- Current robot name: Sacabambaspis
- Website: team294.com

Beach Cities Robotics is a FIRST Robotics Competition (FRC) team from the South Bay area in Southern California. The team is composed of members from both Mira Costa High School and Redondo Union High School.

Beach Cities Robotics (Team 294) finished second in the 2024 FIRST Competition, with alliance partners Team 254, Team 1323, and Team 1189. They also won the 2010 FIRST Breakaway competition in Atlanta, Georgia, along with alliance partners, Team 67 (HOT Team), and Team 177 (Bobcat Robotics). Beach Cities Robotics also won the 2001 FIRST National Championship, and the FIRST Tech Challenge (Quad Quandary) World Championship in 2008.

Beach Cities Robotics often participates in outreach activities in the South Bay, doing demos for middle schools and science events in the community, as well as attending local school district and city council meetings. The team participates in the annual Northrop Grumman open house.

== History ==
Beach Cities Robotics has been a participant in the FIRST program since late 1996 when Hope Chapel Academy, Hawthorne High School, Mira Costa High School, and Redondo Union High School to form one of the first two Southern California teams, Team 61-”Circuit Breakers”. Several individuals (Dr. Beverly Rohrer, K.G. Englehardt, Rob Steele, and Pat Hosken) were instrumental in bringing that original team together with much support from ADTECH, the consortium behind the team’s formation. In 1998, Hope Chapel split off to form their own team, Team 330-”Beach Bots”. Hawthorne, Redondo, and Mira Costa stayed together and were sponsored by TRW and ADTECH, calling themselves the “Vultures”. In 1999, Hawthorne split off to become Team 207-”Metal Crafters” and Redondo and Mira Costa became 294-”Beach Cities Robotics”. In spring 2002, BCR became a year-round program, with students and mentors working more than 2000 hours during the build season.

== 2014 ==
The 2014 FRC game, Aerial Assist, focused on assists between allied robots in the scoring of a 24" yoga ball on the opposite side of the field. Alliances gained additional points for receiving assists from other robots, launching the ball over the truss and catching it, and scoring in a high goal. Team 294's robot, Wavelength, was designed to focus on launching over the truss and scoring high. The team developed a linear shot mechanism and 6CIM drive in order to accomplish these tasks. It competed in the Inland Empire and Los Angeles Regional Competitions.

== 2016 ==
Beach Cities Robotics competed in the 2016 FRC game, Stronghold. Stronghold was one of the most challenging FRC games yet, with robots crossing various field obstacles and scoring foam "boulders" into goals on the opposite side of the field. Beach Cities Robotics' robot, named Dominus, had a pneumatic intake and adjustable arm that allowed them to shoot the boulders from anywhere on the field, as well as a 4CIM drive to cross the field obstacles. It competed in the Los Angeles and Orange County Regional Competitions.

== Achievements ==
- 2024 FRC World Championship finalists
- 2024 FRC Newton Division Champions
- 2024 FRC Aerospace Valley Regional Champions
- 2024 FRC Arizona Valley Regional Industrial Design Award
- 2023 FRC Los Angeles Regional finalists
- 2022 FRC Orange County Regional Entrepreneurship Award
- 2021 FRC INFINITE RECHARGE At Home Boron Group Excellence in Engineering Award
- 2020 FRC Del Mar Regional Industrial Design Award
- 2019 FRC Ventura Regional finalists
- 2019 FRC Ventura Regional Creativity Award
- 2019 FRC Los Angeles Regional Creativity Award
- 2019 FRC Orange County Regional Creativity Award
- 2018 FRC Aerospace Valley Regional finalists
- 2018 FRC Aerospace Valley Regional Industrial Design Award
- 2018 FRC Orange County Regional Innovation in Control Award
- 2017 FRC Central Valley Regional Entrepreneurship Award
- 2016 FRC Hopper Division Semifinalists
- 2016 FRC Orange County Regional semifinalists
- 2016 FRC Orange County Industrial Design Award
- 2016 FRC Los Angeles Regional finalists
- 2016 FRC Los Angeles Quality Award
- 2015 FRC Inland Empire Regional semifinalists
- 2015 FRC Los Angeles Regional Quarterfinalists
- 2014 FRC Los Angeles Regional Winner
- 2014 FRC Los Angeles Dean's List Finalist (Ryan Gulland)
- 2014 FRC Los Angeles Quality Award
- 2014 FRC Inland Empire Regional finalists
- 2014 FRC Inland Empire Industrial Design Award
- 2013 FRC Central Valley Xerox Creativity Award
- 2012 FRC Los Angeles Regional finalists
- 2011 FRC San Diego Finalists
- 2010 FRC World Champions
- 2010 FRC Newton Field Coopertition Award
- 2010 FRC San Diego Regional Champions
- 2010 FRC Los Angeles Regional finalists
- 2009 FRC Los Angeles Regional finalists
- 2008 FTC World Champions
- 2008 FRC Los Angeles Regional finalists
- 2008 FRC San Diego Regional Champions
- 2007 FRC San Diego Regional Champions
- 2004 FRC Southern California Regional Chairman's Award
- 2003 FRC Southern California Regional finalists
- 2001 FRC National Champions
- 2001 FRC Southern California Regional Champions

== Sponsors ==
Northrop Grumman, Boeing, Google, Raytheon, Impresa Aerospace, Cooler Master, John Deere.
