= Breakaway (FIRST) =

2010 FIRST Robotics Competition game

- Year: 2010

Season Information
- Number of teams: 1809
- Number of regionals: 44 (including MI championship)
- Number of district events: 7
- Championship location: Georgia Dome, Atlanta, Georgia

FIRST Championship Awards
- Chairman's Award winner: Team 341 - "Miss Daisy"
- Woodie Flowers Award winner: Chris Fultz - Team 234
- Founder's Award winner: Rockwell Collins
- Gracious Professionalism Winner: Team 1305 - "Ice Cubed"
- Champions: Team 294 - "Beach Cities Robotics"; Team 67 - "The HOT Team"; Team 177 - "Bobcat Robotics"

Links
- Website: usfirst.org/roboticsprograms/frc

Breakaway is the game for the 2010 FIRST Robotics Competition, announced on January 9, 2010. Robots direct soccer balls into goals, traverse "bumps" in the field, suspend themselves and each other on towers, and/or go through a tunnel located in the center of the field.

In 2010, a new driver station was introduced, the Classmate PC, replacing the previous Kwikbyte driver station.

== Game overview ==
=== Scoring ===
Balls are kicked or herded into goals located in the corners of the fields. There are two goals for each alliance, adding up to 4 goals total.

- Scored Ball — 1 point

At the end of the match, bonus points are awarded for robots that cling onto either of the two towers in the center of the field. More bonus points are awarded if alliance robots can suspend themselves from the robot clinging onto the tower.

- Suspended Bot — 2 points
- Bot Suspended From Another Bot — 3 points

=== Game Play ===
The field of Breakaway is divided into three zones. Robots can go under the tunnels or over the bumps to reach another zone.

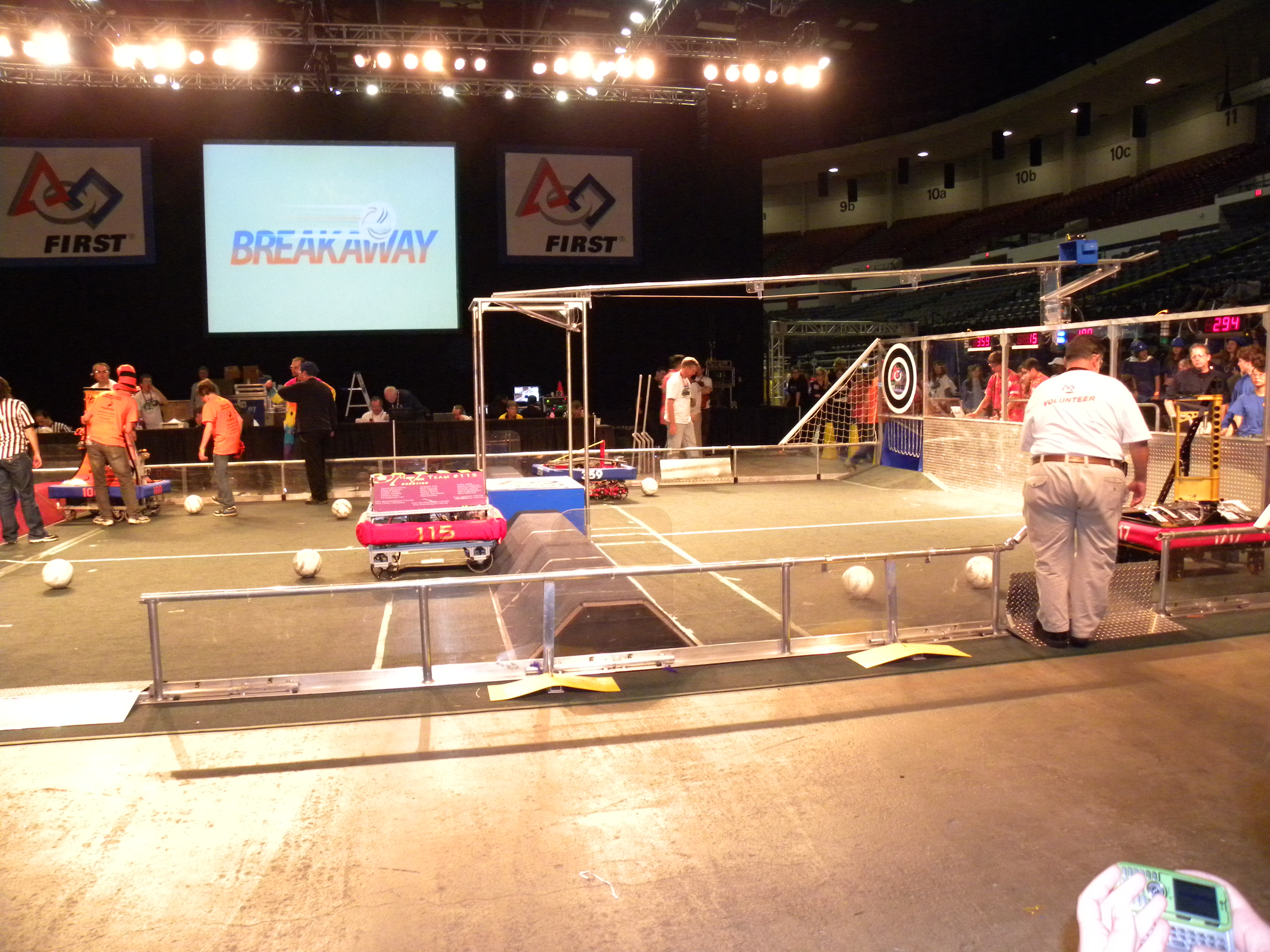
At the Valley View Casino Center

Robots play Breakaway on a 27 by 54-foot rectangular field. The field is bordered by a set of guardrails and alliance walls. There are two "bumps" in the field that divide it into three zones. During matches, the robots are controlled from alliance stations located outside the field at both ends. These rectangular zones consist of three-team player stations that provide connectivity between the controls used by the robot operators and the arena. Goals are located at the corners of the field, and extend behind the alliance wall and adjacent to the player stations. After goals are scored, human players must pick up the balls and pass them to the center of the alliance station to be placed on a ball return rack, after which they will re-enter play at midfield. Teams are penalized if balls are not re-entered within a set time limit.

=== Starting Positions ===
Each round lasts two minutes and fifteen seconds. In the first fifteen seconds of a round, the robots run in autonomous mode, then there are two minutes of game play during which robots are user-controlled. The game is played by two three-robot alliances with each team starting one robot in each of the three sections of the field. At the beginning of a match, every robot must be touching either one of the bisecting bumps or an alliance wall. Also, at the start of the match each of the 12 balls in play must be placed at one vertex of a six foot by six foot grid. There are two grids marked at either ends of each of the three zones.

== Competition schedule ==
- Kickoff — January 9, 2010
- Shipping deadline — February 23, 2010
- Championship — April 15–17, 2010

Seven different fields were built and shipped around different events to be played on.

== Events ==
51 events were held in the 2010 Breakaway season over 5 weeks, from March 4th to April 3rd, 2010. There were 44 regional events and 7 district events. District events were held only in Michigan and led up to the Michigan State Championship in Ypsilanti. In the 2010 season, weeks 1-5 were considered the Regular Season, with the Michigan State Championship and the FIRST Championship be considered Post-Season.

=== Week 1 ===
Event	Location	Date	Champions
Washington DC Regional	Washington, D.C.	March 4 – 6	1727 REX, 3123 Wildcogs, 176 Aces High
Peachtree Regional	Duluth, Georgia	March 4 – 6	1466 Webb Robotics, 1771 North Gwinnett Robotics, 1683 Techno Titans
Granite State Regional	Manchester, New Hampshire	March 4 – 6	1073 The Force Team, 1519 Mechanical Mayhem, 1058 PVC Pirates
Finger Lakes Regional	Rochester, New York	March 4 – 6	1551 The Grapes of Wrath, 217 ThunderChickens, 174 Arctic Warriors
Greater Kansas City Regional	Kansas City, Missouri	March 4 – 6	2345 Kearnage, 525 Swartdogs, 931 Perpetual Chaos
Bayou Regional	Westwego, Louisiana	March 4 – 6	1421 Team CHAOS, 2992 The S.S. Prometheus, 3364 Panhandle Pirates
Oregon Regional	Portland, Oregon	March 4 – 6	997 Spartan Robotics, 2130 Alpha+, 1515 MorTorq
San Diego Regional	San Diego, California	March 4 – 6	359 Hawaiian Kids, 100 The Wildhats, 294 Beach Cities Robotics
Michigan Kettering University District Competition	Flint, Michigan	March 5 – 7	67 The HOT Team, 910 The Foley Freeze, 70 More Martians
Michigan Traverse City District Competition	Traverse City, Michigan	March 5 – 7	1918 NC GEARS, 2645 PowerSurge, 1254 Tech Force
New Jersey Regional	Trenton, New Jersey	March 5 – 7	25 Raider Robotix, 1676 The Pascack PI-oneers, 3059 Riverside Envirobotics

=== Week 2 ===
Event	Location	Date	Champions
Florida Regional	Orlando, Florida	March 11 – 13	86 Team Resistance, 1612 Robo-Sharks, 1251 TechTigers Robotics
Chesapeake Regional	Baltimore, Maryland	March 11 – 13	1517 AMP'D UP, 2377 C Company, 2534 Lumberjack Robotics
WPI Regional	Worcester, Massachusetts	March 11 – 13	230 Gaelhawks, 20 The Rocketeers, 228 GUS
Wisconsin Regional	Milwaukee, Wisconsin	March 11 – 13	2574 RoboHuskie, 1732 Hilltopper Robotics, 171 Cheese Curd Herd
Arizona Regional	Phoenix, Arizona	March 11 – 13	359 Hawaiian Kids, 330 The Beach Bots, 2403 Plasma Robotics
Michigan Cass Tech District Competition	Detroit, Michigan	March 12 – 13	217 ThunderChickens, 469 Las Guerrillas, 2960 Automation Nation
Pittsburgh Regional	Pittsburgh, Pennsylvania	March 12 – 13	1114 Simbotics, 63 McDowell Robotics, 117 Steel Dragons Robotics
Michigan Ann Arbor District Competition	Ann Arbor, Michigan	March 12 – 13	573 Mech Warriors, 2337 EngiNERDs, 66 Grizzly Robotics
New York City Regional	New York, New York	March 12 – 14	341 Miss Daisy, 694 StuyPulse, 3204 Steampunk Penguins, 2265 Fe Maidens
Israel Regional	Tel Aviv, Israel	March 14 – 16	1657 Hamosad, 2669 KY Bots, 2630 Thunderbolts

=== Week 3 ===
Event	Location	Date	Champions
Boilermaker Regional	West Lafayette, Indiana	March 18 – 20	45 TechnoKats Robotics Team, 868 TechHOUNDS, 2171 RoboDogs
Virginia Regional	Richmond, Virginia	March 18 – 20	1676 The Pascack PI-oneers, 1086 Blue Cheese, 1418 Vae Victis
Dallas Regional	Dallas, Texas	March 18 – 20	148 Robowranglers, 2016 Mighty Monkey Wrenches, 1817 Llano Estacado RoboRaiders
Midwest Regional	Chicago, Illinois	March 18 – 20	1732 Hilltopper Robotics, 16 Bomb Squad, 3352 Flaming Monkeys 4-H Robotics Club
St. Louis Regional	St. Louis, Missouri	March 18 – 20	1208 Metool Brigade, 2775 Jackson Area Robotics, 3284 Camdenton LASER
Utah Regional	Salt Lake City, Utah	March 18 – 20	1696 RoboRevolution, 2122 Team Tators, 3405 ALChemists
Silicon Valley Regional	San Jose, California	March 18 – 20	971 Spartan Robotics, 254 The Cheesy Poofs, 649 MSET Fish
Michigan Detroit District Competition	Detroit, Michigan	March 19 – 20	67 The HOT Team, 51 Wings of Fire, 1023 Bedford Express
Michigan West Michigan District Competition	Allendale, Michigan	March 19 – 20	1243 Dragons, 3357 COMETS, 2054 Tech Vikes

=== Week 4 ===
Event	Location	Date	Champions
Long Island Regional	Hempstead, New York	March 25 – 27	271 Mechanical Marauders, 358 Robotic Eagles, 263 Aftershock
Boston Regional	Boston, Massachusetts	March 25 – 27	88 TJ^{2}, 1922 Oz-Ram, 1768 Nashoba Robotics
Buckeye Regional	Cleveland, Ohio	March 25 – 27	2252 The Mavericks, 3010 The Red Plague, 2506 Saber Robotics
Philadelphia Regional	Philadelphia, Pennsylvania	March 25 – 27	341 Miss Daisy, 365 Miracle Workerz, 486 Positronic Panthers
Palmetto Regional	Clemson, South Carolina	March 25 – 27	343 Metal-In-Motion, 1261 Robo Lions, 1398 Robo-Raiders
Waterloo Regional	Waterloo, Ontario, Canada	March 25 – 27	1114 Simbotics, 2056 OP Robotics, 296 Northern Knights
Oklahoma Regional	Oklahoma City, Oklahoma	March 25 – 27	2419 Blue Valley CAPS Metal Mustang Robotics, 935 RaileRobotics, 1987 Broncobots
Colorado Regional	Denver, Colorado	March 25 – 27	1540 Flaming Chickens, 2036 The Black Knights, 1584 Pirates
Los Angeles Regional	Long Beach, California	March 25 – 27	330 The Beach Bots, 1717 D'Penguineers, 1452 Omnicats
Seattle Regional	Seattle, Washington	March 25 – 27	488 Team XBOT, 2557 SOTAbots, 2990 Hotwire
Hawaii Regional	Honolulu, Hawai'i	March 25 – 27	359 Hawaiian Kids, 368 Team Kika Mana, 2467 Sabertron
Michigan Troy District Competition	Troy, Michigan	March 26 – 27	469 Las Guerrillas, 217 ThunderChickens, 1188 Ravens

=== Week 5 ===
Event	Location	Date	Champions
Sacramento Regional	Davis, California	March 31 – April 1	604 Quixilver, 3256 WarriorBorgs, 2761 IronHorse Robotics
Connecticut Regional	Hartford, Connecticut	April 1 – 3	1124 UberBots, 383 Brazilian Machine, 102 The Gearheads
North Carolina Regional	Raleigh, North Carolina	April 1 – 3	1086 Blue Cheese, 1902 Exploding Bacon, 48 Team E.L.I.T.E.
Greater Toronto Regional	Mississauga, Ontario, Canada	April 1 – 3	1114 Simbotics, 2056 OP Robotics, 1547 "Where's Waldo?"
Minnesota 10000 Lakes Regional	Minneapolis, Minnesota	April 1 – 3	1714 MORE Robotics, 2062 CORE, 3038 ICE
Minnesota North Star Regional	Minneapolis, Minnesota	April 1 – 3	71 Team Hammond, 1986 Team Titanium, 2667 Knights of the Valley
Lone Star Regional	, Texas	April 1 – 3	148 Robowranglers, 118 Robonauts, 647 CYBERWOLVES
Las Vegas Regional	Las Vegas, Nevada	April 1 – 3	25 Raider Robotix, 254 The Cheesy Poofs, 3230 PrototypeX

=== District Championships ===
Event	Location	Date	Champions
Michigan State Championship	Ypsilanti, Michigan	March 31 – April 2	1918 NC GEARS, 469 Las Guerrillas, 2834 Bionic Black Hawks

=== FIRST Championship ===
The World Championships were held at the Georgia Dome in Atlanta, Georgia. Attendance was estimated to be around 20,000 at that all-seater stadium. Each division is named after a prominent historical figure in STEM, with the winners of each division playing each other in a final bracket on the Einstein Field.

Event	Location	Date
FIRST Championship	Atlanta, Georgia	April 15 – 17

== FIRST Championship Results ==
The World Championships were held at the Georgia Dome in Atlanta, Georgia. Attendance was estimated to be around 20,000 at that all-seater stadium. Each division is named after a prominent historical figure in STEM, with the winners of each division playing each other in a final bracket on the Einstein Field.

The following tables show the winners of each division and the divisional playoff results.

=== Division Winners ===
Division	Captain	1st Pick	2nd Pick
Archimedes	254	233	3357
Curie	1114	469	2041
Galileo	1625	2056	3138
Newton	294	67	177

=== Divisional Playoff ===
Semifinals
(United States) 294 - 67 - 177	14	14	15	2W
(Canada) (United States) 2056 - 1625 - 3138	13	22	12	1W
(United States) 254 - 233 - 3357	10	11	N/P	0W
(Canada) (United States) 1114 - 469 - 2041	16	19	N/P	2W

Finals
(United States) 294 - 67 - 177	16	16	N/P	2W
(Canada) (United States) 1114 - 469 - 2041	14	13	N/P	0W
