= Double Trouble (FIRST) =

1999 FIRST Robotics Competition game

- Year: 1999

Season Information
- Number of teams: 271
- Number of regionals: 8
- Championship location: Epcot Center, Disney World

FIRST Championship Awards
- Chairman's Award winner: Team 120 - “Scarabian Knights”
- Woodie Flowers Award winner: Ken Patton
- Founder's Award winner: NASA
- Champions: Team 176 - "Aces High"; Team 1 - "The Juggernauts"; Team 48 - "Delphi E.L.I.T.E."

Double Trouble was the 1999 game for the FIRST Robotics Competition, and the first game to feature alliances.

== Field ==
The playing field is a carpeted, rectangular area. Alliances score points by positioning "floppies," their robots, and a "puck" on the playing field. "Floppies" are light-weight, pillow-like objects with Velcro-loop material located in its centre and around its perimeter. The "puck" is a short, octagonal platform that rolls freely on castor wheels. Around the perimeter of the field are four stations for human players, who may throw floppies to each other or onto the playing field. Two additional areas around the field are for the human players who control the robots. At the start of each match, each human player station contains three of the alliance's floppies. Four floppies per alliance are located on the playing field. The floppies are color-coded to identify alliance ownership.

== Robots ==
Each robot can weigh up to 130 lb (59 kg), and must start each match small enough to fit inside a 30" x 36" x 48" space. The robots are powered by two Skil 12 volt rechargeable batteries and use motors from Skil, Delco, Fischer-Price, and Delphi Interior and Lighting, speed controllers from Tekin, pumps from McCord Winn Textron, air cylinders and valves from Numatics, Inc., and a programmable control system supplied by FIRST. Drivers use joysticks from CH Products and switches from Honeywell to remotely control the robots via a radio link which uses RNet wireless modems from Motorola.

== Scoring ==
Each match is two minutes long. Alliances receive one point for each of their floppies that are over the playing field, not in contact with the surface of the playing field, and less than 8 feet above the surface of the playing field. Floppies that are 8 feet or more above the playing field earn 3 points for the alliance it belongs to. Any robot on the puck multiplies its alliance's score by 3. If a puck is entirely on one side of the dividing line that runs through the middle of the field, the alliance whose robot operator stations are furthest from the puck will multiply its score by 2.

Tournament play consisted of seeding and elimination rounds. Seeding was based on greatest number of points scored, not actual number of games won. This led to a dominance of offensive tactics during seeding, and defensive tactics during elimination rounds.

== Events ==
All events. Legend:
Week 1
Week 2
Week 3
Week 4
Week 5
Championship

The following regional events were held in 1999:

Week 1

- NASA Ames California Open - NASA Ames Research Center, Moffett Field, California
- Motorola Midwest Open - William Rainey Harper College, Chicago, Illinois

Week 2

- NASA Kennedy Space Center Open - Kennedy Space Center, Merritt Island, Florida
- FIRST Southwest Open - Space Center Houston, Houston, Texas

Week 3

- Philadelphia Alliance Open - Temple University, Philadelphia, Pennsylvania

Week 4

- UTC New England Open - Meadows Music Theater, Hartford, Connecticut
- Johnson & Johnson Mid-Atlantic Open - Rutgers University, New Brunswick, New Jersey

Week 5

- Great Lakes Open - Eastern Michigan University, Ypsilanti, Michigan

The national championship was held at Epcot Center, Disney World, Orlando, Florida.
