= Infinite Recharge (2021) =

2021 FIRST Robotics Competition game

- Year: 2021

Season Information
- Number of teams: 3,079
- Number of regionals: 0
- Number of district events: 0
- Championship location: Virtual

FIRST Championship Awards
- Chairman's Award winner: Houston Group; 4613 - "Barker Redbacks"; Detroit Group; 503 - "Frog Force"
- Woodie Flowers Award winner: Matt Fagen - Team 4253
- Champions: Game Design Challenge winners 2168 - "Aluminum Falcons"; 1678 - "Citrus Circuits"; 4342 - "Demon Robotics"; Innovation Challenge winner 5553 - "Robo’Lyon"

Infinite Recharge (stylized in all caps) is the FIRST Robotics Competition (FRC) game for the 2021 season. The season is in partnership with Lucasfilm as part of its Star Wars: Force for Change initiative.

Due to the COVID-19 pandemic, the 2021 season is the first season in history to begin with no events scheduled, with teams instead invited to take part in three virtual challenges that will include judged awards. FIRST has also committed to regular reevaluations of the status of the pandemic to determine if in-person events are possible, with the first reevaluation taking place in January. In light of this, some districts had developed plans for limited hybrid events. For example, FIRST Chesapeake, which runs events in Maryland, Virginia, and Washington, D.C., had plans for events that would have taken place in March and April. After completing a review of health measures and COVID statistics, FIRST announced that no North American events would be approved until June 2021.

Teams also worked on their own individual projects, such as producing personal protective equipment (i.e. face masks). Other teams took the season off to develop improvements to their robot that can be applied to future seasons, such as a new drive system.

== Kickoff ==
Kickoff took place on January 9, 2021. The event was streamed over Twitch and featured presentations on the three virtual challenges that will make up a major part of the season.

== Field and Rules ==
The 2021 field is relatively similar to the 2020 field, with no changes that will significantly impact robot design. See below for a summary of changes for the 2021 season.

=== Field and Rule Changes ===
Element	Change(s)
Rendezvous point	Bisecting boundaries have been removed and alliance colored boundaries now use tape. Additionally, the point's size has increased.
Power cell staging	Power cells will now be staged inside the rendezvous point instead of on the boundaries.
Shield generator scoring	Power cell capacity and activation requirements for stages 2 and 3 have decreased from 20 to 15.
Control panel scoring	The value of rotational control has increased from 10 points to 15 points.
Drive team composition	An adult mentor can now serve as a technician in addition to a coach. There can only be one adult per drive team.
Alliance station power cell capacity	Capacity has decreased from 15 to 14.
Robot construction requirements	Teams are no longer required to complete a bill of materials, keep their robot's cost under a certain limit, or comply with limitations on using components designed or fabricated before kickoff.
Bumper design	Bumper corners are no longer required to be of an alliance-specific color.

== Challenges and Events ==
For the 2021 season, virtual challenges are currently expected to take the place of most events. If events do take place, they will occur later in the season, which has been extended to at least early August. For each challenge, teams were assigned to a judging group with other teams from across the world.

=== Virtual Challenges ===
==== Game Design Challenge ====
This challenge will ask teams to create a proposal for a hypothetical FRC game. Teams are allowed to use real-world, virtual, and/or hybrid elements, and will be able to receive awards based on a judge's evaluation of their proposal. Proposals will also be considered for development into a future official game. Teams that participate in this challenge may be eligible to receive the Designer's Award, the Concept Award, the Imagery Award, the Creativity Award, the Engineering Design Award, and/or the Rookie Design Award.

==== Innovation Challenge ====
In this challenge, teams will be asked to design a solution to a problem that is related to the 2020-2021 FIRST season's theme, Game Changers. Teams will then present their solutions, along with a business plan and pitch, to judges, who will evaluate each team's proposal and determine if they will advance to the next stage of the Challenge. The Challenge will culminate in the Global Innovation Awards on June 28-30, which will include a showcase, workshops, and a finalist judging session and awards ceremony.

==== Infinite Recharge at Home ====
This challenge will feature an individual robot and driver skills challenge based on Infinite Recharge field and game elements where teams can demonstrate their robot and compete with other teams for skills challenge awards. Teams will not be required to construct wooden field elements or use a carpet driving surface to complete the challenge. This challenge will also include traditional technical awards, albeit with virtual presentations to judges. Unlike in previous seasons, teams will not be required to have access to their robot to be eligible for these awards. The technical awards that will be presented as part of this challenge are the Autonomous Award, the Excellence in Engineering Award, the Rookie Game Changer Award, the Industrial Design Award, and the Quality Award. Additionally, the team with the highest skills challenge score in their judging group will receive the skills challenge winner award and the team with the second highest score will receive the skills challenge finalist award.

===== Skills Challenges =====
Challenge	Details
Galactic Search Challenge	Teams program their robot to collect power cells autonomously, similar to the autonomous period of a standard match. Teams are scored based on the time needed to collect all the power cells.
AutoNav Challenge	Teams program their robot to drive three predetermined paths as fast as possible. Teams are scored based on the time needed to complete the three paths.
Hyperdrive Challenge	Teams drive their robot through four predetermined paths as fast as possible without preprogramed navigation assistance. Teams are scored based on the time needed to complete each path.
Interstellar Accuracy Challenge	Teams use their robot to pick up and score power cells into lower, upper, and inner ports, similar to the teleop period of a standard match. Teams are scored based on the number of power cells successfully scored into a port in five minutes, with the upper and inner ports worth more points.
Power Port Challenge	Similar to the previous challenge, teams use their robots to pick up and score power cells into the three ports. Teams are scored based on the number of power cells successfully scored into a port in one minute.

=== End-of-Season Awards Shows ===
On June 26 and 30, FIRST held two awards shows to present traditional end-of-season awards as well as awards from two of the three virtual challenges. Infinite Recharge at Home was not represented because all awards in that challenge were presented at the judging group level. Traditional awards and awards from the Game Design Challenge were presented on June 26, while awards from the Innovation Challenge were presented on June 30.
