= Star Wars: Force for Change =

Star Wars-themed charity program

- Named after: Star Wars
- Formation: 2014; 12 years ago
- Purpose: Expanding STEM education
- Headquarters: Los Angeles
- Key people: Mark Hamill, Daisy Ridley
- Parent organization: Lucasfilm, Disney
- Affiliations: FIRST, UNICEF
- Website: www.starwars.com/force-for-change

Star Wars: Force for Change is a Star Wars-themed charity program run by Lucasfilm and The Walt Disney Company that collects donations to fund solutions for global problems. The organization also sells Star Wars-themed merchandise using the profits for charitable causes.

== History ==
Launched in 2014, the program worked closely with UNICEF by selling sweepstakes for the seventh Star Wars film of the saga Star Wars: The Force Awakens and raised approximately $4.2 million.

=== 2015 campaigns ===
In addition to its recent campaigns was selling lucky draws to people who could make cameo appearances in The Force Awakens, some of the actors from the films such as Mark Hamill visited Los Angeles Children's Hospital, while Harrison Ford appeared in a charity video to surprise fans.

=== Fortieth anniversary announcement ===
To commemorate the fortieth anniversary of the Star Wars franchise, organization members Mark Hamill and Daisy Ridley appeared on Good Morning America announcing to fans that they could help Star Wars: Force for Change through UNICEF by going to Omaze and donating money to help children all over the world.

=== Collaboration with FIRST ===
In 2019, Force for Change announced that they were working with FIRST, an organizer of grade school robotics competitions, on FIRST's 2020 season. Due to this, the season was officially named FIRST RISE 2020.
