= Livingston Robotics Club =

Livingston Robotics Club (LRC) is a robotics club in Livingston, New Jersey, US, that provides a community network to introduce Livingston area youth to robotics design and real-life science research, consistent with the concept of FIRST (For Inspiration and Recognition of Science and Technology). LRC member teams have won state, national, and international FIRST LEGO League (FLL) competitions.

== History ==
The initiative to form a robotics club in Livingston was conceived when a team called Landroids was formed in 2007 to compete in FIRST LEGO League. LRC was formed with one team during 2007-2008 seasons. With Landroids' success in that season, LRC gained wider recognition especially in the local community. It later became a member of Healthy Community Healthy Youth Initiative of Livingston – a non-profit community organization with a goal to enhance the lives of children in Livingston – in order to promote its expansion and to become eligible to receive corporate sponsorships.

== Member Teams ==
LRC encourages forming new teams in the community. It has provided guidance and resources for starting robotics team. There were four teams in LRC during 2008-2009 season, expanded to 17 teams throughout NJ from Jr. FLL to FTC divisions, with more than 100 students and two dozen parent coaches in the 2011-2012 season.

=== Landroids ===
Landroids was formed in August 2007 by six 6th and 5th grade students from Livingston New Jersey area, and their parents. Originally registered under the name of Lancer Robotics Club following Livingston’s tradition to name teams in the town as Lancer, it was later formalized as "Livingston Robotics Club" at the end of 2007. Landroids is led by John Yeh for robotics design and Pearl Hwang in project research and jugding. Landroids is considered the founding team of Livingston Robotics Club (LRC), instrumental in promoting the FIRST to general public in New Jersey and worldwide.

Landroids has received many top national and international awards since its formation, including two times NJ State FIRST LEGO League (FLL) 1st place Champion's Awards in 2007, 2008; 2nd and 3rd place awards in Robot Design and Robot Performance in the 2008 FIRST Championship; 1st place Championship's Award and Founder's Award at the 2009 FIRST LEGO League U.S. Open Championship – the highest award for FLL open championship in the United States; 1st place National 8th grade award from the US Army sponsored eCybermission for the team's science research in 2010; 1st place NJ State eCYBERMISSION award in 2011. In 2010, the team also took 1st place in the international Google X-PRIZE LEGO Mindstorms sponsored MoonBots competition and was invited by LEGO Group to visit Denmark as their grand prize MoonBots award.

Landroids members had also compiled and conducted a 5-week long FLL orientation in a "kids teaching kids" format to mentor eight new FLL teams throughout NJ during the summer of 2009. This PowerPoint presentation was later translated to Thai in its entirety for Thailand to startup its FLL participation in its country during the 2009-2010 season. The team hosts annual robotics exhibitions at Liberty Science Center with top FIRST LEGO League teams since 2008 on President's Day during Engineers Week. The Liberty Science Center exhibition was expanded to include Jr. FIRST LEGO League in 2009, added FIRST Tech Challenge (FTC) teams in 2010, and FIRST Robotics Competition (FRC) in 2012.

In September 2010, at age 14, Landroids moved up to the FIRST Tech Challenge high school division, continued to participate in various science and robotics competitions and built on its high performance record. Even in its rookie FTC season, Landroids took home the Delaware State Championship FTC Inspire Award and the Rockwell Collins Innovate Award from the FTC World Championship in 2011.

In 2012, the team won the NJ State Inspire Award, then went on to earn the highest honor, the Inspire Award, at the FTC World Championship in St. Louis, secured a permanent spot in the FTC Hall of Fame. The team also remain the only undefeated team throughout the qualifying rounds at the Worlds, received the Division Winning Alliance Captain and World Finalist Alliance Captain Awards.

=== SciBoTechs ===
SciBoTechs was competitive FLL team founded in 2008 by Dr. Po-Shing Lee, and led by Michelle Weis and Janice Pepper in 2009. The team consists of six team members from the age of 12 to 14 years of age. The team received intense training in project research, robot design and performance, and teamwork. In the 2008 season, SciBoTechs received the first place award in the Research Project at 2008 qualifying tournament in [Hamilton, NJ], and the second place for their research project in states (Mt. Olive). In 2009, the SciBoTechs won the Judge's Award at the Montclair qualifying tournament. The FLL team became inactive in 2010 as the members aged out and entered high school. Some of the members of SciBoTechs joined the Livingston High School FIRST Tech Challenge robotics teams, Lancers.

=== Landrias ===
Landrias is an all-girls team started in 2008 with some team members as siblings of team Landroids and SciBoTechs. Landrias was jointly trained by John Yeh (robot) and Dr. Po-Shing Lee (project) in 2008 and 2010; and Pearl Hwang as the project coach in 2009. Landrias has received the Robot Design Award at 2008 qualifying tournament in Montclair, a 2nd place Robot Design Award at the NJ state tournament in 2008, a Champion's Award at the 2009 qualifying tournament in Montclair, a Champion's Award and 2nd place Robot Performance Award at the 2010 Bergen qualifying tournament. Landrias' mission is to provide hands-on building and programming skills to young girls, while creating a bonding experience for the girls to learn about science and play together.

=== Livingston Alpha Force ===
Livingston Alpha Force is the last team that was formed in 2008 with three members range in age from 8 to 12 years with Janea and Jojo Agbayani as coaches. The team's focus is for recreation and training about science, building with LEGOs, and to start to focus on programming.

=== Others ===
Four additional teams were formed at the start of 2009-2010 season. The first team is r2d2 which comprises six 4th grade boys. Soon followed were Thunderclan, Technophiles, Alpha Force and Supreme Machines. The Spongebots, the only Jr.FLL team in 2009, kicked started the LRC Jr. FLL divisions with a total of 6 LRC Jr. FLL teams in 2010.

=== Exit 5 Robotics ===
Exit 5 Robotics is an all-girls robotics team originally formed in 2010 with four 4th graders and one 3rd grader from Harrison Elementary School in Livingston, NJ. After four seasons of FLL challenges and a 2014 MoonBots challenge, the team has transitioned to a FTC team (2014-2015) with twelve girls (four 8th, one 9th, five 10th and two 11th graders).

For the 2010 FLL Body Forward season, Exit 5 Robotics received the 1st Place Robot Performance Award at the Bergen qualifying tournament, a 3rd place Robot Performance Award as well as the Judge's Award at the 2010 NJ state tournament.

For the 2011 FLL Food Factor season, the team won the Champion's Award and the 1st Place Robot Performance Award at the Liberty Science Center qualifying tournament and a 2nd Place Champion's Award at the 2011 NJ state tournament.

For the 2012 FLL Senior Solutions season, the team won the Champion's Award at the Hillsborough qualifier, a 2nd Place Champion's Award at the 2012 NJ state tournament and a 2nd Place Gracious Professionalism Award at the North American Open Championship.

For the 2013 FLL Nature's Fury season, the team won the Project Award & 1st Place Robot Performance Award in the Sparta qualifier, a 3rd Place Champion's Award at the 2013 NJ state tournament and a 2nd Place Gracious Professionalism Aware at the North American Open Championship.

The team has a common interest in Science, Math, Engineering, Robotics & Technology and is led by coaches Bill Lam, Yitao Yu and Holly Lam. Exit 5A Robotics is an all-girls award-winning team formed with two Exit 5 FLL members from the 2013 FLL season and has competed in three FLL seasons and other competitions. The team has a total of eight 9th graders and is coached by Carmen Yung, Bill Lam, Jerry Siao and Holly Lam. Exit 6B Brobotics is an all-boys award-winning team of 2 6th graders and two 7th graders) and is coached by Bill Lam and Ritu Sohal.

== Awards ==
Below is the list of state, national, and global level awards received by LRC teams.

Season / Theme	Team	Competition	Event Location	Award name
2020-2021 / Game Changers Replay	Exit 6 Robotics	NJ FLL State Championship	NJ Virtual	Engineering Excellence Award
2019-2020 / City Shaper	Exit 6 Robotics	NJ FLL State Championship	Flanders, NJ	Champions Award - 1st Place
2018-2019 / Turning Point	Exit 5 Robotics	CREATE US Open Championship	Council Bluffs, IA	Amaze Award
2018-2019 / Turning Point	Exit 5 Robotics	CREATE US Open Championship	Council Bluffs, IA	Bracket Buster Award
2018-2019 / Into Orbit	Exit 5A Robotics	World FLL Championship	Detroit, MI	Inspiration Award
2018-2019 / Into Orbit	Exit 5A Robotics	World FLL Championship	Detroit, MI	Coach / Mentor Award
2018-2019 / Into Orbit	Exit 5A Robotics	NJ FLL State Championship	Flanders, NJ	Champion's Award - 1st Place
2018-2019 /Smart Cities	Exit 5A Robotics	WRO US Championship	Carlsbad, CA	3rd Place Award
2018-2019 / Next Level	Exit 6B Brobotics	CREATE US Open Championship	Council Bluffs, IA	VIQ Junior High Division - Design Award
2018-2019 / Next Level	Exit 6B Brobotics	VEX IQ NJ State Championship	Tinton Falls, NJ	Judges Award
2017-2018 / In The Zone	Exit 5 Robotics	CREATE US Open Championship	Council Bluffs, IA	Design Award
2017-2018 / In The Zone	Exit 5 Robotics	VRC NJ State Championship	Cherry Hill, NJ	Build Award
2017-2018 / Ringmaster	Exit 6B Brobotics	VEX IQ World Championship	KY	Skills Ranking 102 of 600 teams
2017-2018 / Ringmaster	Exit 6B Brobotics	VEX IQ NJ State Championship	Tinton Falls, NJ	Excellence Award
2017-2018 / Ringmaster	Exit 6B Brobotics	VEX IQ NJ State Championship	Tinton Falls, NJ	Teamwork Challenge Award - 2nd Place
2017-2018 / Hydrodynamics	Exit 5A Robotics	North American Open Championship	Carlsbad, CA	Judges Award
2015-2016 / Trash Trek	Exit 5A Robotics	NJ FLL State Championship	Flanders, NJ	Inspiration Award
2014-2015 / World Class Learning Unleashed	Exit 5A Robotics	NJ FLL State Championship	Flanders, NJ	Mechanical Design Award
2014-2015 / Cascade Effect	Exit 5 Robotics	Google Lunar XPrize Moonbots	--	Finalist
2013-2014 / Nature's Fury	Exit 5 Robotics	North American Open Championship	Carlsbad, CA	Gracious Professionalism Award - 2nd place
2013-2014 / Nature's Fury	Exit 5 Robotics	NJ FLL State Championship	Flanders, NJ	Champion's Award - 3rd place
2013-2014 / Nature's Fury	Exit 5 Robotics	NJ FLL State Championship	Flanders, NJ	Robot Performance Award - 2nd place
2013-2014 / Block Party	Landroids	FTC East Super Regional	Scranton, PA	Inspire Award - 1st Place
2013-2014 / Block Party	Landroids	FTC East Super Regional	Scranton, PA	Championship Winning Alliance Captain
2012-2013 / Senior Solutions	Exit 5 Robotics	North American Open Championship	Carlsbad, CA	Gracious Professionalism Award - 2nd place
2012-2013 / Senior Solutions	Exit 5 Robotics	NJ FLL State Championship	Flanders, NJ	Champion's Award - 2nd place
2012-2013 / Ring It Up	Landroids	FTC World Championship	St. Louis, MO	Edison Division Finalist Alliance Captain
2012-2013 / Ring It Up	Landroids	FTC World Championship	St. Louis, MO	Inspire Award - 2nd Place
2011-2012 / Food Factor	Exit 5 Robotics	FLL World Invitational Open	Winter Haven, FL	17th place out of 85
2011-2012 / Food Factor	Exit 5 Robotics	NJ FLL State Championship	Flanders, NJ	Champion's Award - 2nd place
2011-2012 / Bowled Over	Landroids	FTC World Championship	St. Louis, MO	World Finalist Alliance Captain
2011-2012 / Bowled Over	Landroids	FTC World Championship	St. Louis, MO	Franklin Division Winning Alliance Captain
2011-2012 / Bowled Over	Landroids	FTC World Championship	St. Louis, MO	Inspire Award - 1st Place
2010-2011 / Body Forward	Exit 5 Robotics	NJ FLL State Championship	Flanders, NJ	Robot Performance Award - 3rd place
2010-2011 / Body Forward	Exit 5 Robotics	NJ FLL State Championship	Flanders, NJ	Judge's Award
2010-2011 / Get Over It	Landroids	FTC World Championship	St. Louis, MO	Rockwell Collins Innovate Award
2009-2010 / Smart Move	Landroids	NJ FLL State Championship	Flanders, NJ	Robot Design Award - 1st place
2009-2010 / Smart Move	Thunderclan	NJ FLL State Championship	Flanders, NJ	Robot Design Award - 2nd place
2008-2009 / Climate Connections	Landroids	FLL U.S. Open Championship	Dayton, OH	Champion’s Award - 1st place
2008-2009 / Climate Connections	Landroids	FLL U.S. Open Championship	Dayton, OH	Robot Alliance - 1st place
2008-2009 / Climate Connections	Landroids	FLL U.S. Open Championship	Dayton, OH	Founder's Award
2008-2009 / Climate Connections	Landroids	FLL New Jersey State Tournament	Flanders, NJ	Champion’s Award - 1st place
2008-2009 / Climate Connections	Landroids	FLL New Jersey State Tournament	Flanders, NJ	Robot Performance Award - 2nd place
2008-2009 / Climate Connections	Landrias	FLL New Jersey State Tournament	Flanders, NJ	Technical Award - 2nd place
2008-2009/ Climate Connections	SciBoTechs	FLL New Jersey State Tournament	Flanders, NJ	Research Award - 2nd place
2007-2008 / Power Puzzle	Landroids	FIRST LEGO League World Festival	Atlanta, GA	Quality Design Award 2nd Place
2007-2008 / Power Puzzle	Landroids	FIRST LEGO League World Festival	Atlanta, GA	Robot Performance Award - 3rd Place
2007-2008 / Power Puzzle	Landroids	FLL New Jersey State Tournament	Flanders, NJ	Champion’s Award
2007-2008 / Power Puzzle	Landroids	FLL New Jersey State Tournament	Flanders, NJ	Performance Award - 2nd place
