= FIRST Lego League =

FIRST Lego League may refer to:

- FIRST Lego League Challenge, an international robotics competition for elementary and middle school students
- FIRST Lego League Explore, a non-competitive robotics program for children ages six to ten
