= FIRST Lego League Open Championships =

Robotics competition

FIRST Lego Challenge League Open Championships are robotics competitions held and managed by FIRST Lego League Partners to bring FIRST Lego League Challenge teams from many states, regions and countries together to compete in host cities around the world. These are the highest level of FIRST Lego League competitions that are managed by organizations other than FIRST. The FIRST-managed global competition for FIRST Lego League is the FLL World Festival. There are usually multiple Open Championships each year.

== FIRST Lego League Open European Championship ==
=== 2006 Eindhoven, Netherlands ===
The 2006 FIRST Lego League Open European Championship was held May 6,7 in Eindhoven, Netherlands. The venue was the Technical University of Eindhoven. 84 teams from 27 countries competed for the Awards in this year's season "Ocean Odyssey".

=== 2007 Bodø, Norway ===
The 2007 FIRST Lego League Open European Championship was held from May 16 to 21 in Bodø, Norway. There were 66 teams from Austria, Canada, China, Czech Republic, Germany, Hungary, Iceland, Israel, Japan, Jordan, Korea, Mexico, Netherlands, Norway, Peru, Poland, Russia, Saudi Arabia, Singapore, South Africa, Spain, Sweden, Taiwan, Turkey, United Kingdom, and United States.

The theme for the competition was Nano Quest to challenge participating teams to research and design new solutions using nanotechnology. It also had a standard FLL tournament for the teams to compete. There were many awards in the competitions including FLL OEC Champion's Award, Research Award, Presentation Award, Robot Design Award, Programmers Award, Innovative Design Award, Robot Performance Award, Coach/Mentor Award, Teamwork Award, Against All Odds Award, and Team Spirit Award.

Year / theme	Award name	Team	City, state/country
2007 / Nano Quest	FLL OEC Champions Award	Amaze Robinho	Istanbul, Turkey
2007 / Nano Quest	Project Award	RISbotics	Eindhoven, Netherlands
2007 / Nano Quest	Research Award	Amaze Robinho	Istanbul, Turkey
2007 / Nano Quest	Presentation Award	Widcombe Wrobotiers	Bath, United Kingdom
2007 / Nano Quest	Robot Design Award, 1st place	RISbotics	Eindhoven, Netherlands
2007 / Nano Quest	Robot Design Award, 2nd place	JunkYard Babies	Borlänge, Sweden
2007 / Nano Quest	Programmers Award	Nano-X-Titus	Pekin, IL, United States
2007 / Nano Quest	Innovative Design Award	Widcombe Wrobotiers	Bath, United Kingdom
2007 / Nano Quest	Robot Performance Award, 1st place	Compass	China
2007 / Nano Quest	Robot Performance Award, 2nd place	First Edition	Borlänge, Sweden
2007 / Nano Quest	Coach/Mentor Award	Yellow River Children	China
2007 / Nano Quest	Teamwork Award	Super Hyper Quantum Kangaroos	Portland, OR, United States

=== 2009 Copenhagen, Denmark ===
The open championship for 2009 was held in Copenhagen, Denmark from May 1 to May 3. The event was called Children's Climate Call with teams answering a call to address the global issue of climate change. The event followed standard the standard FIRST Lego League championship format with a tournament and presentation. There were many awards in technical, project presentation, and special recognition categories. The highest award was the OEC Champion's Award. Fifty-five teams from 29 countries and states around the world presented their solutions in two groups, Climate Connections and Climate Actions. The participants also enjoyed a visit by His Royal Highness Crown Prince Frederik of Denmark.

Year / theme	Award name	Team	City, state/country
2009 / Climate Connections	FLL OEC Champion's Award	NXT Generations	Denmark
2009 / Climate Connections	Robot Performance Award, 1st place	Equipe Terradróide	Brazil
2009 / Climate Connections	Robot Performance Award, 2nd place	Jiangzhe united team	China

=== 2010 Istanbul, Turkey ===
The 2010 FIRST Lego League Open European Championship was held June 2,3 2010 in Istanbul, Turkey. 56 teams competed for the Awards. The venue was the Haliç Congress Center which has a rich historical background. In the old etchings, the area of center can be seen as a slaughterhouse. The building took its recent neoclassic form in the 1920s.

Haliç Congress Center contains four different types of buildings. These buildings are; Cinema Building, Concert Hall, Theatre Building and Exhibition Hall. All of them are equipped with the latest technology. The center is located in the inner area of Haliç (Golden Horn).

Year / theme	Award name	Team	City, state/country
2010 Smart Move	FLL OEC Champions Award	Team Singapore	Singapore
2010 Smart Move	Project Award	DAS	Saudi Arabia
2010 Smart Move	Robot Performance Award, 1st place	Integra	Turkey
2010 Smart Move	Robot Performance Award, 2nd place	MCGBots	Germany
2010 Smart Move	Teamwork Award	Integra	Turkey
2010 Smart Move	Robot Design Award	Superboom	South Africa
2010 Smart Move	Research Award	Techno Future	Egypt
2010 Smart Move	Programming Award	Toin Robotics Jr.	Japan
2010 Smart Move	Team Spirit Award	C-Force	China
2010 Smart Move	Innovative Solution Award	Die See	Turkey
2010 Smart Move	Innovative Design Award	RobotixTreme	Switzerland
2010 Smart Move	Creative Presentation Award	Caro Aces	Germany
2010 Smart Move	Against All Odds Award	Van Gölü Canavarlai	Turkey
2010 Smart Move	Coach / mentor Award	Olleh Korea!!!	South Korea
2010 Smart Move	Jury Award	Argonautes	Spain

=== 2011 Delft, Netherlands ===
The 2011 FIRST Lego League Open European Championship was held June 2–4 in Delft, Netherlands. 67 teams competed at the event held at the Delft University of Technology. The competition theme was Body Forward, on the topic of biomedical engineering.

Year / Theme	Award name	Team	City, State/Country
2011 / Body Forward	Champion's Award 1st Place	AttraktivUndPreiswert	Germany
2011 / Body Forward	Champion's Award 2nd Place	Infinity	Netherlands
2011 / Body Forward	Champion's Award 3rd Place	Al-Xavier	Thailand

=== 2012 Mannheim, Germany ===
The FIRST Lego League Open European Championship took place in Mannheim, Germany, from June 6 to June 9, 2012. It hosted 67 teams from more than 35 countries. The competition theme was Food Factor, on the topic of food safety.

Award	Place	Team	Country
FLL OEC Champion	1st	BINTULU HAWKS	Malaysia
FLL OEC Champion	2nd	INC.8	India
FLL OEC Champion	3rd	Red Hot Tomatoes	Israel
Robot Game	1st	H.C Union	China
Robot Game	2nd	Straight into T-junction	Japan
Robot Game	3rd	Mechatronic Ants	Spain
Robot Design / Mechanical Design	1st	NXT Generation	Denmark
Robot Design / Mechanical Design	2nd	CIBERBOTS	Mexico
Robot Design / Mechanical Design	3rd	Emeq Eagles	Israel
Robot Design / Programming	1st	SAP Robonova XL	Germany
Robot Design / Programming	2nd	Robo-Raptors	Canada
Robot Design / Programming	3rd	H.D.U. team	China
Robot Design / Strategy and Innovation	1st	Westside	USA
Robot Design / Strategy and Innovation	2nd	mindfactory	Switzerland
Robot Design / Strategy and Innovation	3rd	LEGObusters	Netherlands
Core Values / Inspiration	1st	The Moovers	USA
Core Values / Inspiration	2nd	SAP ReMovers 4.0	Germany
Core Values / Inspiration	3rd	Food Kidz	Netherlands
Core Values / Teamwork	1st	Epunkt e.	Germany
Core Values / Teamwork	2nd	NXTeam	Sweden
Core Values / Teamwork	3rd	DaCubs	South Africa
Core Values / Gracious Professionalism	1st	SAP 40 Termin8tors	Ireland
Core Values / Gracious Professionalism	2nd	The KookaGumJoeys	Australia
Core Values / Gracious Professionalism	3rd	Roosters	Slovenia
Project / Research	1st	TIC TAC TOE	Libanon
Project / Research	2nd	St Thomas´Food-o-bots	UK
Project / Research	3rd	Sci-Borgs	Canada
Project / Innovative Solutions	1st	SAP MoonWalkers 4.0	India
Project / Innovative Solutions	2nd	LEGO Master	Norway
Project / Innovative Solutions	3rd	Giants	Lebanon
Project / Presentation	1st	ApoioBot	Brazil
Project / Presentation	2nd	Sunny United	South Korea
Project / Presentation	3rd	Lucky 7	Turkey
Judges Award		Crusoebots 2.0	Chile
Adult Coach Mentor Award		Emeq Eagles	Israel
Youth Mentor Award		Simon Hagen, Epunkt e.	Germany

=== 2013 Paderborn, Germany ===
The Open European Championship 2013 took place in Paderborn, Germany, from May 7 to May 10, 2013. It hosted 54 teams from more than 35 countries. The competition theme was Senior Solutions. This year, the teams had to find solutions to help older people in their daily lives, thus improving their life quality.

- FLL OEC 2013 Web
- FLL OEC 2013 Robot Game Scoring
- FLL OEC 2013 Awards
- FLL OEC 2013 Statistical Results

=== 2014 Pamplona, Spain ===
The Open European Championship 2014 took place in Pamplona, Spain, from May 28 to May 31, 2014. The event gathered 95 FLL teams, over 1.500 attendees, from 41 countries all over the world.

Award	Place	Team	Country
FLL OEC 2014 Champion	1st	Mechatronic Ants	Spain
FLL OEC 2014 Champion	2nd	The Incredibots	USA
FLL OEC 2014 Champion	3rd	Watt's 2 Clean?	The Netherlands

=== 2016 Tenerife, Spain ===
The Open European Championship 2016 took place in Tenerife, Spain, from May 4 to May 7, 2016. 89 FIRST Lego League teams from 40 countries from all over the world competed in the Trash Trek challenge at the OEC. The teams had to find solutions for better recycling, waste management and waste reduction.

Award	Place	Team	Country
FLL OEC Champion	1st	SESI Robotics School	Brazil
FLL OEC Champion	2nd	Galaxy Robos	Jordan
FLL OEC Champion	3rd	Team PolyGone	India
Robot-Game	1st	MonteBot	Montenegro
Robot-Game	2nd	Cassapeia	Germany
Robot-Game	3rd	TalentumSAP	Slovakia
Robot-Design / Mechanical	1st	TalentumSAP	Slovakia
Robot-Design / Mechanical	2nd	Robot Artists	Republic of Korea
Robot-Design / Mechanical	3rd	MonteBot	Montenegro
Robot-Design / Programming	1st	Cassapeia	Germany
Robot-Design / Programming	2nd	FLL 1010	Germany
Robot-Design / Programming	3rd	AC/DC/EG	Brazil
Robot-Design / Strategy & Innovation	1st	Glendal I Bots	Australia
Robot-Design / Strategy & Innovation	2nd	OVERCLOCK AXULAR	Spain
Robot-Design / Strategy & Innovation	3rd	Black&White	Slovenia
Core Values / Inspiration	1st	Episcopal Collegiate LegoCats	United States
Core Values / Inspiration	2nd	A.C.M.E.	Italy
Core Values / Inspiration	3rd	Robokids United	Pakistan
Core Values / Teamwork	1st	ROBOCOONS	Mexico
Core Values / Teamwork	2nd	Organized Kaos	United States
Core Values / Teamwork	3rd	I-SET Hey That's Us	South Africa
Core Values / Grasious Professionalism	1st	SESI MEGASNAKES	Brazil
Core Values / Grasious Professionalism	2nd	SAPHARI	Germany
Core Values / Grasious Professionalism	3rd	RoboSuns OS Koper	Slovenia
Project / Research	1st	Techno-fusion	Lebanon
Project / Research	2nd	Team Fanatic	Denmark
Project / Research	3rd	ROBO AXION	Greece
Project / Innovative Solution	1st	FrancoDroid	Brazil
Project / Innovative Solution	2nd	Triblox	Estonia
Project / Innovative Solution	3rd	Rubbish Runners	United Kingdom
Project / Presentation	1st	TechCOE	Brazil
Project / Presentation	2nd	KRONOS La Vall	Spain
Project / Presentation	3rd	ELI-minator-Gang	Germany
Judges / Rising Star	1st	Incredible Squirrels	Spain
Judges / Rising Star	2nd	Siberian Hearts	Russia
Judges / Rising Star	3rd	de aFvaLLbusters	The Netherlands
Judges / Entrepreneurship	1st	Angry Bulls	Mexico
Judges / Entrepreneurship	2nd	No Limits	France
Judges / Entrepreneurship	3rd	TEZUKAYAMA Alpha	Japan
Judges / Coach	1st	Montero	Montenegro
Judges / Coach	2nd	1068 Israel	Israel
Judges / Coach	3rd	X-LANDERS 6.0	The Netherlands
Volunteer		Sara Ibaceta	

=== 2017 Aarhus, Denmark ===
The 2017 FIRST Lego League Open European Championship took place in Navitas Research Institute in Aarhus, Denmark from May 25 to 28, 2017. A total of 118 teams from 50 countries from all over the world attended the invitational championship in Aarhus, Denmark.

Award	Place	Team	Country
Champions Award	Gold	Team Phantom	Malaysia
Champions Award	Silver	mindfactory	Switzerland
Champions Award	Bronze	Project Bucephalus	Australia
Robot Performance	1st	SAPHARI	Germany
Robot Performance	2nd	Re(h)scue	Germany
Robot Performance	3rd	RoboSuns OS Koper	Slovenia
Mechanical Design Award	1st	Beavers	Spain
Mechanical Design Award	2nd	TECMADE	Brazil
Mechanical Design Award	3rd	Intersection Confero	Turkey
Programming Award	1st	SAPHARI	Germany
Programming Award	2nd	HFG-RoboS	Germany
Programming Award	3rd	The Baggerbusters	Netherlands
Strategy and Innovation Award	1st	FIRST FUJISAN ROAR	Japan
Strategy and Innovation Award	2nd	Team Supercalifragilisticexpialidocious	India
Strategy and Innovation Award	3rd	GSG Robots	Germany
Inspiration Award	1st	Dutch Delta	Netherlands
Inspiration Award	2nd	Maynard Wine Gums	England
Inspiration Award	3rd	Voyager 6	United States
Core Values Award	1st	PARROTS	Spain
Core Values Award	2nd	NXT EV3lution	Danmark
Core Values Award	3rd	Electronic Falcons	Spain
Gracious Professionalism Award	1st	Galilegos	Brazil
Gracious Professionalism Award	2nd	Stem Cells	Australia
Gracious Professionalism Award	3rd	ENIGMA	India
Best Research Award	1st	Imagineers	South Africa
Best Research Award	2nd	SESI CERQUIBOTICOS	Brazil
Best Research Award	3rd	DYCI Blue Ocean 10	Philippines
Innovative Solution Award	1st	Black&White	Slovenia
Innovative Solution Award	2nd	UnderConstruction	Lebanon
Innovative Solution Award	3rd	Amazeing 10	Hong Kong SAR
Presentation Award	1st	Future Falcons	UAE
Presentation Award	2nd	Bright Engineers	Jordan
Presentation Award	3rd	Smarties	Norway
Rising Star Award		Team Apollo	Australia
Against All Odds Award		NAS Team	Lebanon
Best Mentor Award		DYCI Blue Ocean 10	Philippines

== FIRST LEGO League Asia-Pacific Open Championship ==
=== 2008 Tokyo, Japan ===
The 2008 FIRST LEGO League Open Asian Championship was held from April 27 to 29 in Tokyo, Japan. The event was held at the Tokyo Metropolitan Gymnasium. There were 55 teams from Brazil, Canada, China, Denmark, Egypt, Germany, France, Hong Kong, Ireland, Israel, Japan, Malaysia, Mexico, Netherlands, Norway, Peru, Saudi Arabia, Singapore, South Korea, Spain, Sweden, Taiwan, Turkey, United Kingdom, and United States that joined the competition in the theme of Power Puzzle.

Award name	Team	Country
OAC Champion's Award	Jolly Roger	Sweden
Total Presentation Award	GO ENASON	Malaysia
Judge's Award	TECNO Wurth	Brazil
Robot Performance Award, 1st Place	icNRG	Netherlands
Robot Performance Award, 2nd Place	Jolly Roger	Sweden
Robot Performance Award, 3rd Place	Winning Eleven	China
Technical Award	Lego Extrem	Norway
Robot Dependability Award	NARA Education University JHS	Japan
Innovative Solution Award	DAS Important Penguins	Saudi Arabia
Creative Presentation Award	Sunny	China
Innovative Design Award	7 de sec+2	Spain
Quality Research Award	The Flaming Blades	Singapore
Team Spirit Award	Young Girls CJD	Germany
Teamwork Award	St. Geralds Castlebar Clan	Ireland

=== 2010 Kaohsiung, Taiwan ===
The 2010 First Lego League Open International Championship was held May 6–8, 2010 in Kaohsiung, Taiwan. 64 teams from 24 countries competed for the Awards. The venue was the Kaohsiung Arena. The Kaohsiung Arena is located at the intersection of Bo'ai Road and Sinjhuangzai Road. It extends over a total area of 56,000 square meters. This state-of-the-art and multifunctional sports arena, with a seating capacity of 15,000, is also known to the citizens of Kaohsiung as 'Xiaojudan'.

Year / Theme	Award name	Team	City, State/Country
2010 Smart Move	Champion's Award	Attraktiv Und Preiswert	Germany
2010 Smart Move	Team Spirit Award	chakkham	Thailand
2010 Smart Move	Against All Odds Award	Junior Kids	Faroe Islands
2010 Smart Move	Teamwork Award	Power Kings	Malaysia
2010 Smart Move	Coach / Mentor Award	Stars Lego Sesi	Brasil
2010 Smart Move	Creative Presentation	SS501	Taiwan
2010 Smart Move	Innovative Solution Award	NXT Generation	Eindhoven, Netherlands
2010 Smart Move	Research Quality Award	Team Brick Howes	USA
2010 Smart Move	Robot Performance Award	Auto Rubik	Taiwan
2010 Smart Move	Innovative Design Award	Jedi White	Singapore
2010 Smart Move	Programming Award	MXT Israel	Israel
2010 Smart Move	Robot Design Award	Westside	USA
2010 Smart Move	Local Award	Auto Rubik	Taiwan
2010 Smart Move	Judge's Award	the Sun's Descents	Taiwan

=== 2013 Sydney, Australia ===
The 2013 First Lego League Asia-Pacific Open Championship was held in Macquarie University, Sydney, from the 4th to 6 July 2013. 30 teams came from countries including India, Brazil, China, Japan, South Korea, Philippines, Hong Kong, Singapore, Taiwan, Egypt, Australia and Thailand.

Year / Theme	Award name	Team	City, Country
2013 Senior Solutions	Champion's Award	Team R Factor	Mumbai, India
2013 Senior Solutions	Project Research	Team NeXT	Delhi, India
2013 Senior Solutions	Project Innovation	SESI Legotoobbies	Brazil
2013 Senior Solutions	Project Presentation	Franco Droids	Brazil
2013 Senior Solutions	Programming	Lego Lords	Brazil
2013 Senior Solutions	Robot Performance	HDU (722/723)	China
2013 Senior Solutions	Mechanical Design	DongHai School	China
2013 Senior Solutions	Programming	Project Bucephalus	Australia

=== 2015 Sydney, Australia ===
The 2015 First Lego League Asia-Pacific Open Championship was held at Macquarie University, Sydney, from the 10th to 12 July 2015. More than 40 teams from around the globe came to participate.

Award	Team	Country
'Against all odds’ Judges Award	Fusion Core X	Pakistan
‘Rising Star’ Judges Award	Deccan Technicians	India
‘All-Rounder’ Judges Award	BAZINGA	Brazil
Mechanical Design Award	Robobuilders	Lebanon
Programming Award	BaCoN Lego Team	Australia
Strategy & Innovation Award	sAPG Tigers	Germany
Robot Performance Award (858 pts)	Transformers of Taiwan	Taiwan
Teamwork Award	Nucleólicos	Mexico
Inspiration Award	Ubuntu Imagineers	Philippines
Gracious Professionalism Award	Newton Busters	USA
Research Award	ICE	Hong Kong
Innovative Solution Award	The Nocturnalists	Thailand
Creative Presentation Award	SESI ItapêRobota	Brazil
Champion’s Award	SESI Robotic Generation	Brazil

=== 2016 Sydney, Australia ===
The Asia Pacific Open 2016 took place in Sydney, Australia on the 3-5 of July 2016.

=== 2017 Sydney, Australia ===
The Asia Pacific Open 2017 took place in Sydney, Australia on the 6–9 July 2017.

=== 2025 Sydney, Australia ===
The Asia Pacific Open Championships took place at Macquarie University in Sydney, Australia between 3-6 July 2025, featuring over 56 teams from around the globe.

== FIRST LEGO League North American Open Championship ==
=== 2009 Dayton, Ohio ===
FIRST LEGO League United States Open Championship was held for the first time from May 7 to 9 at Wright State University campus in Dayton, Ohio. It was the first national level competition of FIRST LEGO League in the United States not organized by FIRST. The event was organized by Wright-Patterson Air Force Base and Wright State University. There were 60 teams around the country each of which was the Championship's Award winner of each state/region. Each team completed 9 tasks on a competition table in a 2.5 minute robot round. Teams also meet with judges for evaluation of their robot design, programming and their problem-solving strategies, and their research project, which is tied to the Challenge theme. There were many award categories with the top three winners receiving Champion's Awards.

Year / Theme	Award name	Team	City, State/Country
2009 / Climate Connections	Champion's Award 1st Place	Landroids	Livingston, NJ
2009 / Climate Connections	Champion's Award 2nd Place	Cougars	Columbus, OH
2009 / Climate Connections	Champion's Award 3rd Place	Fire Breathing Rubber Duckies	Portland, OR

=== 2011 Carlsbad, California ===
The 2011 FIRST LEGO League North American Open Championship was held May 21–22 in Carlsbad, California. 76 teams competed at the event held at LEGOLAND California. The competition theme was Body Forward. The awards given were:

- Champion
- Robot Performance
- Robot Design
- Project
- Core Values
- Judges' Awards

=== 2012 Carlsbad, California & Winter Haven, Florida ===
The first of two 2012 North American Open Championships was held May 18–20 in Carlsbad, California at LEGOLAND California. It was joined by its newly opened sister park Legoland Florida in Winter Haven, FL which also hosted a tournament May 4–6.

== FIRST LEGO League International Open Championship Canada ==
=== 2014 Toronto, Canada ===
The 2014 FIRST LEGO League International Open Canada was held June 4–7 in Toronto, Ontario, Canada. The venue was the University of Toronto, downtown campus, specifically in Varsity Arena. 72 teams from countries around the world will be competing for robotic supremacy in the "Nature's Fury" theme.

Award	Place	Team	Country
Champion	1st	Rotatech Stars	Turkey
Champion	2nd	SESI ItapeRobota	Brazil
Champion	3rd	Heat it Up and Keep it Cool	California, USA
Robot Game	1st	SC (580pts)	China
Robot Game	2nd	SESI ItapeRobota (576pts)	Brazil
Robot Design / Mechanical Design	1st	The Kin-nects	Ontario, Canada
Robot Design / Mechanical Design	2nd	Whitfield Academy Red Storm	Kentucky, USA
Robot Design / Programming	1st	Project Bucephalus	Australia
Robot Design / Programming	2nd	Brick Warriors	Michigan, USA
Robot Design / Strategy and Innovation	1st	Keep Calm and Order Pizza	Singapore
Robot Design / Strategy and Innovation	2nd	Krulle-Go!	The Netherlands
Core Values / Inspiration	1st	Déjà vu	Florida, USA
Core Values / Inspiration	2nd	Neon Electrons	Missouri, USA
Core Values / Teamwork	1st	Electros	India
Core Values / Teamwork	2nd	dbp Team Mirandola	Italy
Core Values / Gracious Professionalism	1st	World Changers	Iowa, USA
Core Values / Gracious Professionalism	2nd	Les Caches a L’eau	Quebec, Canada
Project / Research	1st	Category 10	Ontario, Canada
Project / Research	2nd	Floral Park Brick Heads	New York, USA
Project / Innovative Solutions	1st	Not the Droids You Are Looking For	Pennsylvania, USA
Project / Innovative Solutions	2nd	Height Differential	Minnesota, USA
Project / Presentation	1st	GEETec	Brazil
Project / Presentation	2nd	Blackout	Ontario, Canada

== FIRST LEGO League Open Africa Championship ==
=== 2015 Johannesburg, South Africa ===
The 2015 FIRST Lego League Open Africa Championship was held in Johannesburg, South Africa, from the 5th to 7 May 2015.

Award	Place	Team	Country
Champion	1st	SESI Robonaticos	Brazil
Champion	2nd	Kipabots	Israel
Robot Game	1st	SESI Robonaticos (731pts)	Brazil
Robot Game	2nd	SESI Mega Snakes (715pts)	Brazil
Robot Design Strategy	1st	FIRST FUJISAN	Japan
Robot Design Strategy	2nd	LICEO ROSMINI IPEC	Italy
Robot Design Mechanical Design	1st	GO ROBOT	Germany
Robot Design Mechanical Design	2nd	KASAPIN40	Bulgaria
Robot Design Programming	1st	GEETec	Brazil
Robot Design Programming	2nd	CaroAces	Germany
Project Research Process	1st	MAYDAY RETURNS	India
Project Research Process	2nd	TIC TAC TOE	Lebanon
Project Presentation	1st	Robosuns OS Koper	Slovenia
Project Presentation	2nd	Pitalegòrics	Spain
Project Innovative Solution	1st	Dream Team	South Africa
Project Innovative Solution	2nd	Legowl	Israel
Core Values Teamwork	1st	SESI MEGA Snakes	Brazil
Core Values Teamwork	2nd	Revolution	Turkey
Core Values Inspiring Award	1st	SESI Fênix	Brazil
Core Values Inspiring Award	2nd	SESI Turbotubies	Brazil
Core Values Gracious Professionalism	1st	SAP Cheese	South Africa
Core Values Gracious Professionalism	2nd	Divergent	Lebanon

== FIRST LEGO League Razorback Invitational Championship ==
=== 2015 Fayetteville, Arkansas ===
The 2015 FIRST LEGO League Razorback Invitational was a 72-team, invitational, FIRST LEGO League championship tournament held May 14–17, 2015, on the University of Arkansas campus in Fayetteville, Arkansas. The event was hosted by the Freshman Engineering Program at the University of Arkansas.

Award	Place	Team	Country
Champion	1st	Not the Droids You Are Looking For	Pittsburgh, PA, USA
Champion	2nd	Blue Sharks	Kfar Yona, Israel
Champion	3rd	Sh!ft1	La Crosse, Wisconsin
Robot Game	1st	Climbers (834pts)	Tokorozawa, Japan
Robot Game	2nd	Not the Droids You Are Looking For (794pts)	Pittsburgh, PA, USA
Robot Game	3rd	Blue Sharks (699pts)	Kfar Yona, Israel
Robot Design / Mechanical Design	1st	Climbers	Tokorozawa, Japan
Robot Design / Mechanical Design	2nd	SIZARS	Incheon, Korea
Robot Design / Mechanical Design	3rd	MAKbots	San Antonio, Texas, USA
Robot Design / Programming	1st	CoSmIC FUSiON	Sussex, Wisconsin, USA
Robot Design / Programming	2nd	is LOST	Toronto, Ontario, Canada
Robot Design / Programming	3rd	15 Percent	Madison, Alabama, USA
Robot Design / Strategy and Innovation	1st	Baker's Dozen	Granger, Indiana, USA
Robot Design / Strategy and Innovation	2nd	LEGO Legion	Cincinnati, Ohio, USA
Robot Design / Strategy and Innovation	3rd	Mustechs	Valrico, Florida, USA
Core Values / Inspiration	1st	Rockin' Robotics	Rockwall, Texas, USA
Core Values / Inspiration	2nd	The Knights That Say Ni	Wollongong, Australia
Core Values / Inspiration	3rd	Robotworks Y	Hacienda Heights, California, USA
Core Values / Teamwork	1st	The Electro‐Cuties	Alpine, Utah, USA
Core Values / Teamwork	2nd	B.O.L.T. (Berkeley's Outstanding Lego Team)	Moncks Corner, South Carolina, USA
Core Values / Teamwork	3rd	Harry Bot‐ters	South Jordan, Utah, USA
Core Values / Gracious Professionalism	1st	NERDs	Shawnee, Oklahoma, USA
Core Values / Gracious Professionalism	2nd	Taz Bot RENEGADES	Boca Raton, Florida, USA
Core Values / Gracious Professionalism	3rd	the LunaTechs	Cary, North Carolina, USA
Project / Research	1st	Seven Wonders	Mt. Washington, Kentucky, USA
Project / Research	2nd	Hotshot Hotwires	Somers, New York, USA
Project / Research	3rd	World Changers	Davenport, Iowa, USA
Project / Innovative Solutions	1st	Lego Adrenaline	Sergeant Bluff, Iowa, USA
Project / Innovative Solutions	2nd	Lions in the Kitchen	Emek Heffer, Israel
Project / Innovative Solutions	3rd	Team Phoenix	Lafayette, Louisiana, USA
Project / Presentation	1st	Braille Boys & Annie	Cumming, Georgia, USA
Project / Presentation	2nd	Double Helix	Mumbai, India
Project / Presentation	3rd	TAZ BOTS	Boynton Beach, Florida, USA

=== 2016 Fayetteville, Arkansas ===
The 2016 Razorback Invitational was held in Fayetteville, Arkansas from May 19–22, 2016.

=== 2017 Fayetteville, Arkansas ===
The 2017 Razorback Invitational was held in Fayetteville, Arkansas from May 18–21, 2017.

== FIRST LEGO League Mountain State Invitational ==
=== 2017 Fairmont, West Virginia ===
The 2017 Mountain State Invitational was held at Faimont State University in Fairmont, West Virginia from July 7–9, 2017.

=== 2019 Fairmont, West Virginia ===
The 2019 Mountain State Invitational was held at Faimont State University in Fairmont, West Virginia from July 12–14, 2019.

Award	Place	Team	Country
Champion	1st	Gametech	Goiânia, Brazil
Champion	2nd	LEGO of Olympus	Brasília, Brazil
Champion	3rd	LEGO Legion	Cincinnati, Ohio, USA

== FIRST LEGO International Open ==
=== 2008 Minneapolis, Minnesota, USA ===
The international open for 2008 was held in Minneapolis, Minnesota from May 1–3, 2008. The event was called HighTechKids First Lego League International Open using the Power Puzzle challenge. Teams event had the standard judging and performance aspects as well as a head-to-head competition and an alliance challenge. For the alliance challenge teams were assigned to an alliance made up of 4 teams at the beginning of the tournament.

Award	Team	Country
Research Quality	Shebots	Minnesota
Innovative Solution	EagleKnights	Mexico
Creative Presentation	SaberRobotics	Texas
Teamwork	Robotical Minds	Colombia
Robot Performance	Mech Masters	Florida
Team Spirit	Techno Dolphins	South Carolina
Sportsmanship	Majesty Hybrids	Kentucky
Design	Biofusioneers	Colorado
Innovative Design	Techno Travelers	Minnesota
Programming	Team Happy Face	Illinois
IREE Alternative Energy Award	Fish in the Boat	Minnesota
Judge's Award	CFC	Brazil
Judge's Award	The GearHeads	Illinois
Seagate International Alliance Award	Muskies (RoboSharks, RoboSharks, Quantumbots, Light Savers)	(Texas, Colombia, Ohio, Iowa)
Champions Award	Attraktivundpreiswert	Germany

=== 2019 Byblos, Lebanon ===
The 2019 FIRST LEGO League Open International was the first international open championship held in the Arab World, co-organized by the Education and Technology Center, FIRST LEGO League operational partners in Lebanon, and the Lebanese American University - LAU in Byblos between June 14 and June 16, 2019 under the patronage of the president of the council of ministers Mr. Saad Hariri.

The event joined 72 teams from 35 countries from 5 continents, with 684 participating team members, and over 1000 attendees on the 3 days of the event. Even though team 90% Success did not compete in these past seasons, they will be remembered in the next year, themed Masterpiece.

Award	Team	Country
Rising Star Award	RobotBirds	Greece
Judges' Award 1	Sparkling Stars	Pakistan
Judges' Award 2	Eureka	India
Judges' Award 1	Astro-Fusion	Lebanon
Robot Performance	Franco-Droid	Brazil
Robot Performance	M-Rast	Turkey
Robot Performance Champion	ROC	Canada
Research Award	Robo Lyon Kids	France
Research Award	Jr. Roboformers	Turkey
Research Award Champion	AMBER	Lithuania
Innovative Solution Award	MyCoLlego	Italy
Innovative Solution Award	Eco Robots	Slovenia
Innovative Solution Award Champion	Anto-Tech	Lebanon
Presentation Award	Stars of Space	Turkey
Presentation Award	Despicable Team	Slovenia
Presentation Award Champion	4th Vertex	Lebanon
Strategy & Innovation Award	Techno Nerds	India
Strategy & Innovation Award	M-Rast	Turkey
Strategy & Innovation Award Champion	Infinite Rockets	Japan
Programming Award	Inter-Galactic Mafia	India
Programming Award	Enigma Robotics Team	Lebanon
Programming Award Champion	SAPpers	Hungary
Mechanical Design Award	Connectados	Brazil
Mechanical Design Award	Fabulous Party	Japan
Mechanical Design Award Champion	Galaxy Forces	Brazil
Teamwork Award	WSTA	Spain
Teamwork Award	INSOMNIA	India
Teamwork Award Champion	Team Expendables	Egypt
Inspiration Award	Incredibots	United Arab Emirates
Inspiration Award	Space Walkers	North Macedonia
Inspiration Award Champion	TKLA Sci-Bono Space Ants	South Africa
Gracious Professionalism Award	C'est La Vie	Greece
Gracious Professionalism Award	Kiborgs.UA	Ukraine
Gracious Professionalism Award Champion	No Fear	Lebanon
Finalist	Rotatech	Turkey
Finalist	Franco-Droid	Brazil
Champion	Tic Tac Toe	Lebanon
