= Mission Mars =

- Challenge Number: 6
- Released In: 2003
- Teams: 4331

Mission Mars was the 2003-04 challenge theme of FIRST Lego League. It revolved around the NASA missions to Mars with the Spirit and Opportunity rovers.

== Project ==
Teams were tasked with choosing a mission model, researching a question about it, and finding a creative solution. Then teams shared their project with the community and with judges at competition.

== Gameplay ==
The table performance portion of Mission Mars is played on a 4 ft by 8 ft field rimmed by wood boards. At competition, two of these fields are placed together to form an 8 ft square. In each 2 1/2-minute match, a team competes on each field with their robot to earn up to 400 points manipulating the mission models.

One of the mission models, the Alliance Habitation Module, straddles both fields in the center. This model can earn points for both teams when the two halves are pushed together. The touch penalty objects are four boulders, worth up to 14 points each depending on location. One is removed from the field each time the robot is touched outside of base.

Home base was unusual this year; usually base is a square region set in the corner of the field. For Mission Mars, the robot started on a fold-out platform (to emulate the Mars Rovers) sitting in a triangular base.

=== Missions ===
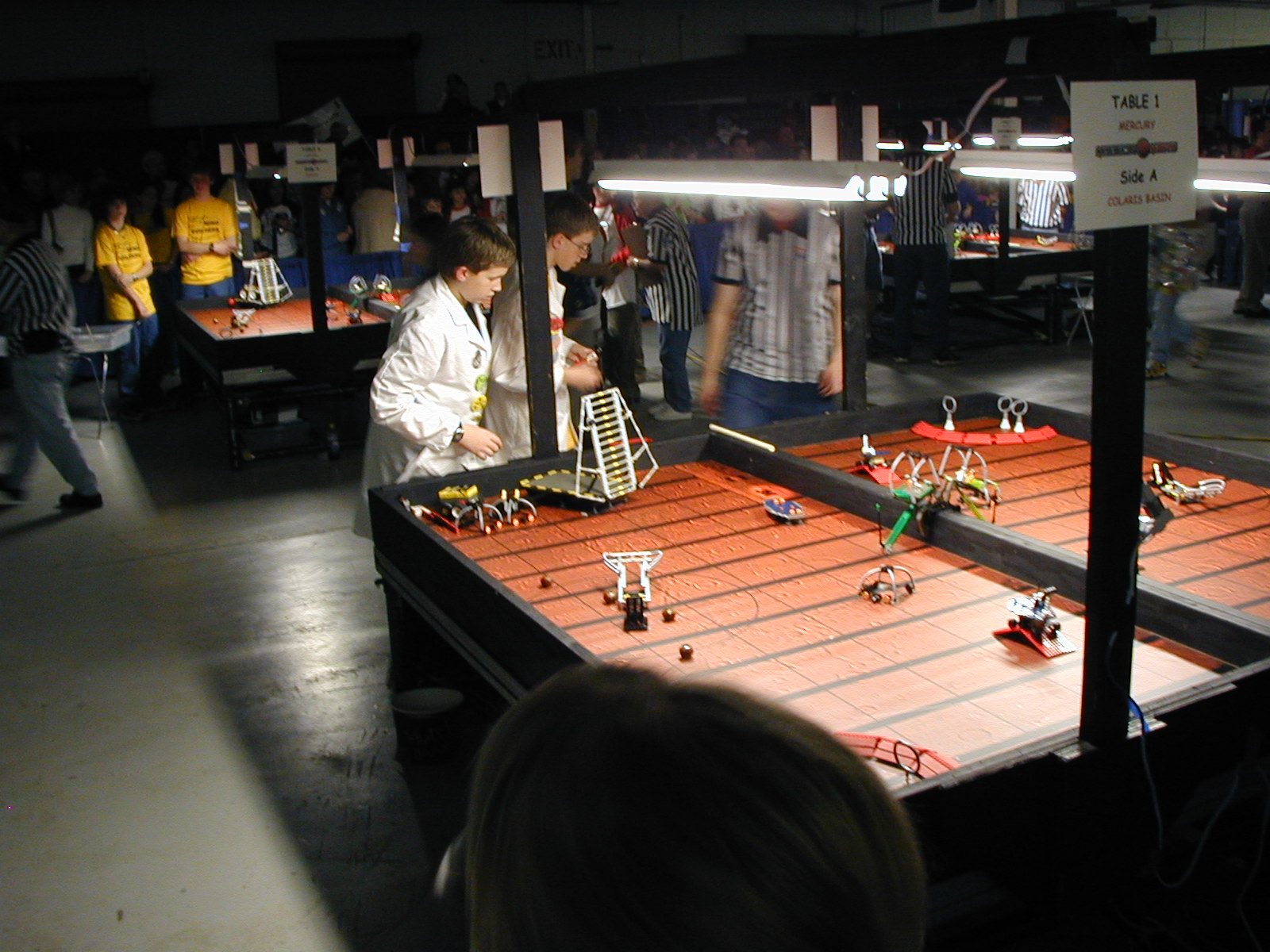
Mission Mars field

All the missions were themed after aspects of Mars exploration:

- Exit the Tetrahedron Base - 39 points
- Launch The Sample Canister - up to 39 points
- Clear The Solar Panel - up to 43 points
- Connect The 180° and 90° Habitation Modules - up to 49 points
- Complete The Alliance Habitation Module - 43 points for each team
- Free The Rover - up to 43 points
- Move Ice Cores to base - up to 49 points
- Move Boulders Into The Launch Circle - up to 14 points each (up to 56 points)
- All Terrain Vehicle Test - 39 points
