= Valentina Muñoz Rabanal =

Chilean influencer, activist, and programmer (born 2002

- Rabanal in 2023
- Born: 2002 (age 23–24)
- Other name: Chica Rosadita
- Education: Universidad Técnica Federico Santa María
- Occupations: Programmer, activist, influencer

Valentina Muñoz Rabanal, also known as Chica Rosadita (born 2002), is a Chilean influencer, activist, and programmer. She was a member of the first-ever all-female team to become FIRST Lego League Challenge champions, and became known as for her work on Artificial Intelligence regulations in Chile. She has also founded NGO Asociación de Mujeres Jóvenes por las Ideas, focused on supporting women in STEM, and was appointed a United Nations Sustainable Development Goals Advocate.

== Biography ==
Rabanal was born in 2002. Her mother worked in sales for a technology company, and Rabanal was brought with her to the office. At 9, the office had a cyberattack. During the panic, she wandered over to the IT office, where she asked what they were doing. She has stated their response was "saving the world". This led to her becoming interested in cybersecurity: she stated "I dreamed of being a hacker since I was nine." She learned to program at 12, and audited programming classes starting when she was 14 at the University of Chile. In 2018, she became a part of the first female team to become the world champions of the FIRST Lego League Challenge.

At 15, she co-founded the Asociación de Mujeres Jóvenes por las Ideas, which focuses on supporting women in STEM. It was created at her school and soon spread. It is better known as AMUJI Chile. Through the project, she has worked on providing resources for helping women in public speaking, science, technology, and project management. She also advocated for women in the science by submitting proposals regarding increasing inclusion to the Ministry of Science of Chile. She also developed an alternative learning platform called AMUJIPEDIA, which collected information from and partnered with specialized sites, during the COVID-19 pandemic.

She worked on ensuring the comments of women and children would be taken into consideration by the Chilean government when they designed their artificial intelligence policy, as the comment sessions were restricted to adults. She did this by organizing dialogue sessions and collating notes. This led to her becoming known as the youngest contributor to the First National Policy on Artificial Intelligence of Chile. She also helped organize the Latin American and Caribbean consultation on the 25th anniversary of the Beijing Declaration.

She was named an ambassador of UNICEF, UN Women, and the Children's ombudsman.

On September 17, 2021, she was named a United Nations Sustainable Development Goals advocate by then-Secretary General António Guterres. She was the first Latin American woman to serve as a United Nations Sustainable Development Goals advocate. She also spoke at the opening of the High-level Political Forum on Sustainable Development at the age of 19, where she discussed the importance of equality in the digital age.

In 2023, the Chilean Mint put her on a list of nine women who could appear on a commemorative banknote for the mint's 280th birthday, alongside Michelle Bachelet, Isabel Allende, Christiane Endler, Eloísa Díaz, Violeta Parra, María Teresa Ruiz, María Luisa Bombal, and Margot Duhalde. She received online hate comments after this, especially from far-right groups.

She is also known as "Chica Rosadita", or The Pink Girl, for her style. She has asserted that digital rights are human rights, and has emphasized women's equality in the digital age. She has stated that "it is crucial that when we talk about the [digital gap], it is through the lens of intersectionality". She has also advocated for a "more inclusive" digital future with less strict separations between STEM and the humanities. She has asserted that she is not an influencer, but a science communicator.

As of September 2024, she was a second-year student at the Universidad Tecnica Federico Santa Maria studying computer science, after having paused her studies to serve as SDG advocate. She was named to Fundación Mujer Impacta's 2024 list of Impactful Women. She is currently working on a goal to create an international convention of digital rights.
