= Anima Patil-Sabale =

Indian born software and aerospace Engineer

- Born: Anima Patil; Maharashtra, India
- Citizenship: American
- Education: • North Maharashtra University • San Jose State University • University of North Dakota
- Spouse: 1
- Children: 2
- Scientific career
- Fields: Software Engineering, Aerospace Engineering, Space Human Factors
- Website: linkedin.com/in/animasabale

Anima Patil is an Indian born Software Engineer, Aerospace Engineer and Systems Engineer. She's currently working in EVA (Extra Vehicular Activity) Operations as Artemis Telemetry Displays Development Lead, Flight Controller and Crew Instructor at NASA's Johnson Space Center in Houston. She is also a NASA Spaceflight Academy Instructor. Before this she was Orion Spacecraft Simulations Lab Manager at NASA JSC. She's a Scientist-Astronaut Candidate for commercial spaceflight research projects during her off work hours.

She did her schooling from jalgaon. Patil studied in St.Joseph School there. She did her Bachelors in Physics from North Maharashtra University of Jalgaon. She was born in Dhule town of Maharashtra.

== Early life and education ==
Patil-Sabale was born in Dhule in Maharashtra, India and grew up in Jalgaon. As a child she developed a fascination for the stars and the galaxy when she would sleep on the terrace during summers in her hometown in India. Watching them for hours became a hobby and she wondered about traveling to them. When she was seven she learned she can become an astronaut and actually travel to the stars, after seeing pictures of US and Russian astronauts and rocketships in books at a book exhibition at her school. She obtained her BSc in Physics in North Maharashtra University, India. She planned to apply to be a fighter pilot in the Indian Air Force, despite the Indian Air Force not accepting females at that time, but she had to drop the idea as she didn't meet another criterion of having a perfect 20/20 vision. She decided that she did not want to do a MSc in Physics, but instead got her Masters in Computer Applications at the North Maharashtra University, India. It was here that she met her husband. After getting married and getting their degrees they worked for a software company in Mumbai. In March 2000 they moved to San Jose, California, where Patil-Sabale continued working in the software industry.

== Career ==
While still working, she started a Masters in Aerospace Engineering at San Jose State University, which she finished in 2010. At this time she also had had her second son. In 2012 she was offered the job of Senior Principal Software Engineer in Operations Engineer at the Kepler mission, a position she held for 3.5 years. This same year she also became a US citizen, a prerequisite to her position at NASA. After the Kepler mission, Patil-Sabale worked as a Software Engineer in the Intelligent Systems Division at NASA Ames Research Center. Currently, she works in the human spaceflight program in EVA Operations at NASA Johnson Space Center as Artemis Telemetry Displays Development Lead, Flight Controller and Crew Instructor.

Patil-Sabale has been involved in a number of simulated missions. In 2014, she was selected for a four-month simulated Mars mission in Hawaii, but she could not attend. In 2015, she was the Commander for NASA's HERA : Human Exploration and Research Analog (HERA) VII at the Johnson Space Center in Houston, Texas, a 14-day analog mission to an asteroid Geographos. Patil-Sabale graduated from the PoSSUM (Polar Suborbital Science in the Upper Mesosphere) Scientist-Astronaut program in 2016. In 2017, Patil-Sabale became a Citizen Scientist-Astronaut candidate for the PHEnOM (Physiological, Health, and Environmental Observations in Microgravity) Project. In 2018, she was the Crew Commander of Crew 193 at the Mars Desert Research Station in Utah. She is furthermore a First Tier Support Engineer for Hi-SEAS, a Mars Analog Mission on Hawaii. She has participated in research missions. She has flown more than fifty parabolas till now on a Falcon 20 aircraft wearing a spacesuit to test its performance. She spun in centrifuge and pulled 6G's as a part of a research study. She was in 6 inch headdown tilt position for eight hours on two separate days for NASA's Simulated Microgravity Fluid Loading Study

== Public engagement ==
She is a NASA Girls mentor and a NASA speaker. She is also a Boy Scouts of America Assistant Scout Master, FIRST LEGO League coach, a certified open water scuba diver, a student pilot. She is a TEDx Speaker as well having been invited to deliver couple of TEDx talks.

== Recognition ==
Patil-Sabale won the 2017 Women of Influence Award. https://www.nasa.gov/centers-and-facilities/johnson/johnson-celebrates-aa-and-nhpi-heritage-month-anima-patil-sabale/
