= Felienne Hermans =

Dutch engineer and academic

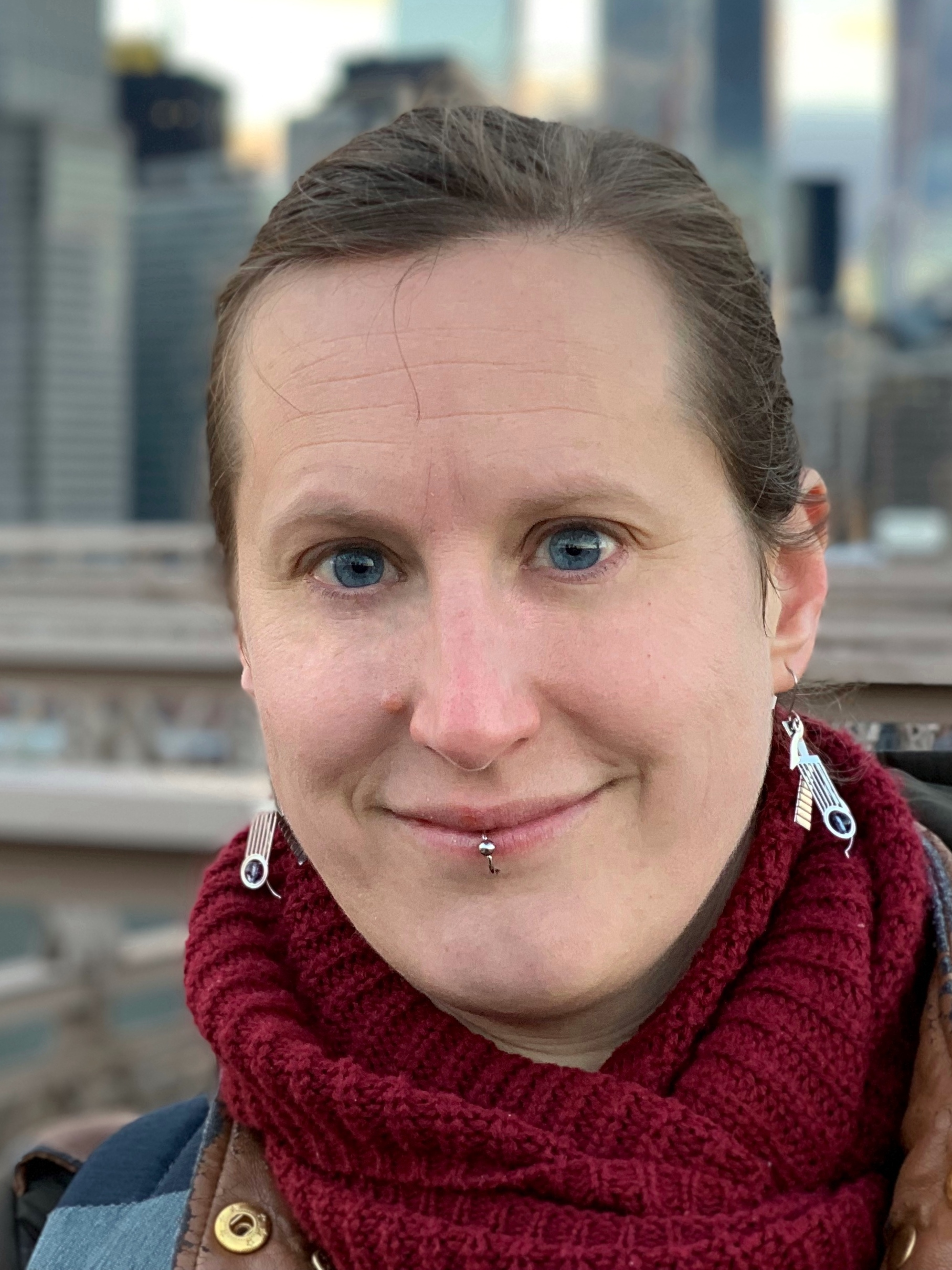
- Hermans in 2018
- Born: Felienne Frederieke Johanna Hermans; 1984 (age 41–42)
- Education: Eindhoven University of Technology (MSc); Delft University of Technology (PhD)
- Known for: Spreadsheets
- Scientific career
- Fields: Programming education End-user computing
- Workplaces: Vrije Universiteit Amsterdam; Leiden University; Delft University of Technology
- Thesis: Analyzing and visualizing spreadsheets (2013)
- Website: www.felienne.com

Felienne Frederieke Johanna Hermans (born 1984) is a scientist and Professor at Vrije Universiteit Amsterdam. Her research interests include programming education and end-user computing particularly spreadsheets.

== Education ==
Hermans received her Master of Science degree in computer science from Eindhoven University of Technology, and her PhD in software engineering in 2013 from Delft University of Technology.

== Career and research ==
After her PhD, she was appointed an assistant professor at Delft University of Technology, heading the Spreadsheet Lab.

As of 2024 Hermans is head of the Programming Education Research Lab (PERL).

Hermans is the founder and former CEO of Infotron, a research spin-off company of TU Delft that implements risk assessment software for spreadsheets.

Hermans is active with DigiLeerkracht, the computational thinking teaching by Future.nl, and teaches programming, including one day a week at the Lyceum Kralingen in Rotterdam. In addition, Hermans is a referee at the FIRST Lego League Challenge, where children build a robot from Lego. She served as a board member at Devnology Nederland, an organisation for software developers. She is a co-organiser of the yearly conference Joy of Coding.

=== Outreach ===
In 2011, Hermans gave a TEDx talk in Delft.

Hermans has given research talks at conferences including StrangeLoop, NDC, GOTO, and DDD Europe, a conference about domain-driven design. Since 2016, she is a host of SE Radio.

Hermans produced several Massive open online courses (MOOCs) on edX, with topics including programming in Scratch for teachers and children. She self-published an e-book about the creation of games for children. In 2017, she started a program for Rotterdam elementary students to receive programming lessons. In 2020, Hermans launched the Hedy programming language, to teach children to use the Python programming language.

She is the author of The Programmer's Brain: What every programmer needs to know about cognition. In 2026, she published another book "Vierkante ogen; hoe informatici de wereld zien en vormen."

=== Awards and honours ===
Hermans' online data analysis course was awarded the Wharton-QS gold education award for best education innovation project entry in Europe.

Hermans won the SURF Education Award in 2017, SURF being the collaborative Information and communications technology (ICT) organisation for Dutch education and research.

In 2018, the Open Education Consortium awarded her the Open Education Award for Excellence. Also in 2018, Hermans won the Tech Inspirator Award at the Techionista Awards.
