= Teresa Paneque =

Chilean astronomer

Teresa Paz Paneque Carreño (Madrid, November 15, 1997) is an astronomer, writer, and science communicator with dual Chilean and Spanish nationality. In 2021, she co-authored a scientific publication describing gravitational instabilities in the star Elias 2-27, providing evidence for the hypothesis of gravitational instability in protoplanetary disks. She is known for her work in science communication and raising awareness about the sciences on social media, where she explains astronomical phenomena with a focus on children and adolescents. In 2023, she was named the first female UNICEF ambassador in Chile.

== Biography ==
=== Early years and education ===
Paneque was born in Madrid, Spain, in 1997. Her father is a biochemist and her mother a pharmaceutic chemist. When she was five years old, she moved to Glasgow due to her parents' postdoctoral research. At the age of nine, she moved to Chile, and due to her education in Europe, she entered the 6th grade of primary school, two years before the corresponding age; there, she began to be interested by robotics, taking part in the Chile's FIRST Lego League Challenge.

She has a Bachelor's and Master's degree in astronomy, both of the University of Chile, since 2020, she is studying a Doctorate in the same area in the European Southern Observatory (Germany) and the Leiden University (Netherlands).

=== Work ===
She is known in Chile for her book "El Universo Según Carlota" (The Universe According to Carlota), an illustrated book, for kids and young people, in which she explains, with the reality of the Universe, what a shooting star is like.

She is a pop scientist in social media since 2019, with more than 440k followers in her TikTok, Instagram and Twitter accounts. Along the social networking, she also has participated in national events carried out by University of Chile, the Chilean Antarctic Institute, and Congreso Futuro. She also is frecuentily part of "A Última Hora" (At The Last Minute), a radio show of Radio Cooperative. In 2021, she created the podcast "Fuera de Órbita" (Out of Orbit), for the radio station TXS Plus.

In January 2022, she made news when she entered into a heated debate on Twitter about the veracity and lack of evidence supporting astrology with a Chilean astrologer and sociologist.

== Investigation area ==
Her area of investigation is the formation of planets, specifically the study of the chemical conditions in the environments of planetary formation. She is co-author of a 2021 scientific publication which describes gravitational instability of Elias 2-27 star, giving evidence about the gravitational instability in Protoplanetary disks.

== Awards ==
She was awarded by the Physics and Math Sciences Faculty of the University of Chile, for the best post grade thesis of 2021, and for the Fundación Mujeres Bacanas ("Cool Women Foundation"), as the U-30 Cool Woman of 2020 (Bacana Sub-30 de 2020).

== Publications ==
=== Books ===
- El universo según Carlota. Chile: Planeta Junior. 2021. ISBN 978-956-9992-81-0.
- El universo según Carlota - Agujeros negros y explosiones estelares. Chile: Planeta Junior. 2022. ISBN 978-956-6159-31-5.
- El universo según Carlota - Vida extraterrestre y exoplanetas. Chile: Planeta Junior. 2023. ISBN 978-956-6159-98-8.
- Abecedario astronómico. Chile: Unicef Chile. 2024. ISBN 978-92-806-5545-2.

=== Research publications ===
- Hall, C.; Dong, R.; Teague, R.; Terry, J.; Pinte, C.; Paneque-Carreño, T.; Veronesi, B.; Alexander, R. D. et al. (December 1, 2020). "Predicting the Kinematic Evidence of Gravitational Instability". The Astrophysical Journal 904 (2): 148. ISSN 0004-637X. doi:10.3847/1538-4357/abac17.
- Paneque-Carreño, T.; Pérez, L. M.; Benisty, M.; Hall, C.; Veronesi, B.; Lodato, G.; Sierra, A.; Carpenter, J. M. et al. (June 1, 2021). "Spiral Arms and a Massive Dust Disk with Non-Keplerian Kinematics: Possible Evidence for Gravitational Instability in the Disk of Elias 2–27". The Astrophysical Journal 914 (2): 88. ISSN 0004-637X. doi:10.3847/1538-4357/abf243.
- Veronesi, Benedetta; Paneque-Carreño, Teresa; Lodato, Giuseppe; Testi, Leonardo; Pérez, Laura M.; Bertin, Giuseppe; Hall, Cassandra (June 1, 2021). "A Dynamical Measurement of the Disk Mass in Elias 2–27". The Astrophysical Journal Letters 914 (2): L27. ISSN 2041-8205. doi:10.3847/2041-8213/abfe6a.
- Terry, J. P.; Hall, C.; Longarini, C.; Lodato, G.; Toci, C.; Veronesi, B.; Paneque-Carreño, T.; Pinte, C. (December 30, 2021). "Constraining Protoplanetary Disk Mass Using the GI Wiggle". Monthly Notices of the Royal Astronomical Society 510 (2): 1671–1679. ISSN 0035-8711. doi:10.1093/mnras/stab3513.
- Law, C.; Teague, R.; Öberg, K..; Rich, E.; Andrews, S.; Bae, J.; Benisty, M.; Facchini, S.; Flaherty, K.; Isella, A.; Jin, S.; Hashimoto, J.; Huang, J.; Loomis, R.; Long, F.; Romero-Mirza, C..; Paneque-Carreño, T.; Pérez, L.; Qi, C.; Schwarz, K.; Stadler, J.; Tsukagoshi, T.; Wilner, D..; van der Plas, G. (May 8, 2023). "Mapping Protoplanetary Disk Vertical Structure with CO Isotopologue Line Emission". The Astrophysical Journal 948 (1): 60. ISSN 0004-637X. doi:10.3847/1538-4357/acb3c4.
- Law, C.; Alarcón, F.; Cleeves, L.; Öberg, K.; Paneque-Carreño, T. (December 20, 2023). "CI Traces the Disk Atmosphere in the IM Lup Protoplanetary Disk". The Astrophysical Journal Letters 959 (2): L27. ISSN 0004-637X. doi:10.3847/2041-8213/ad0e06.
