= Smart Move (FIRST) =

- Challenge Number: 12
- Released In: 2009
- Missions: 9
- Teams: 14725
- Tournaments: 214
- Championship Tournaments: 61

Smart Move is the name of the 2009-10 FIRST Lego League challenge, released September 3, 2009. It is centered on transport and how to make new and more efficient forms.

== Project ==
Teams were tasked with identifying a transportation problem, whether it be local or worldwide. They then had to create an innovative solution to the problem and share it with others.

== Gameplay ==
The table performance portion of Smart Move is played on a 4 ft by 8 ft field rimmed by wood boards. At competition, two of these fields are placed together to form an 8 ft square. In each 2 1/2-minute match, a team competes on each field with their robot to earn up to 400 points manipulating the mission models.

One of the mission models, the Yellow Bridge, straddles both fields in the center. Both teams can earn points from completing this mission.

The touch penalty objects are warning beacon models. All 8 are worth 10 points each if they are upright on the field, but are removed from play every time the robot is touched outside of base.

== Missions ==
=== Gain Access To Places (choose one) ===
The robot needs to be in one of these positions when the match ends:

TARGET SPOT - Parked with its drive wheels or treads touching the round target. Value: 25 points.

YELLOW BRIDGE DECK - Parked with its drive wheels or treads touching your yellow bridge decking, but not touching any red decking or the mat. Value: 20 points.

VEHICLE SHARING - Parked with its drive wheels or treads touching the red bridge decking, but not touching the mat. Value: 25 points.

=== Gain Access to Things ===
ACCESS MARKERS - Access markers need to be in their “down” position. Value: 25 points each.

LOOPS - Required Condition: Loops need to be in Base. Value: 10 points each.

BONUSES - If all three gray loops have reached Base, a team member may take one red loop into Base by hand. If all three red loops have reached Base, a team member may take one loop of any color into Base by hand.

=== Avoid Impacts ===
WARNING BEACONS - Warning beacons need to be upright (square to the mat). Value: 10 points each. ALSO: Warning beacons are the touch penalty objects for Smart Move. This means each time a team member touches his vehicle while it's completely out of Base, the referee removes one upright beacon. The beacons are removed in order from south to north, then from west to east. If there are no upright beacons at the time of the touch, there is no penalty.

SENSOR WALLS - Sensor walls need to be upright (square to the mat). To count, each upright wall needs a "down" access marker, up to four walls. Value: 10 points each, max 40.

=== Survive Impacts ===
SENSOR WALLS - No (zero) sensor walls are upright. Value: 40 points.

VEHICLE IMPACT TEST - The truck needs to no longer touch the ramp's red stopper beam. The robot needs to be completely out of Base when it releases the truck, otherwise the referee removes two upright warning beacons (in the same manner as two touch penalties). Value: 20 points.

SINGLE PASSENGER RESTRAINT TEST - The crash‐test figure needs to be aboard the robot for the entire match. The first time the robot is without the figure, the referee removes the figure. Any reasonable constraint system is allowed. Value: 15 points.

MULTIPLE PASSENGER SAFETY TEST - All four people are sitting or standing in or on a transport device of the team's design and some portion of that object is in the round target area. Value: 10 points.
