= FIRST Lego League Challenge =

Robotics competition

- Current season, competition or edition: BIOGLOW (2026-2027)
- Sport: Robotics-related games
- Founded: 1998
- Founder: Dean Kamen
- President: Lawrence Cohen
- Motto: "More Than Robots"
- No. of teams: 35,140 (2018-2019)
- Countries: International
- Venues: Houston, Texas; Detroit, Michigan
- Qualification: State or National Competition in respective country/state.
- Related competitions: FIRST Robotics Competition; FIRST Tech Challenge; FIRST Lego League Explore
- Website: www.firstlegoleague.org

The FIRST Lego League Challenge (formerly known as FIRST Lego League) is an international competition organized by FIRST for elementary and middle school students (ages 9–14 in the United States and Canada, 9-15 elsewhere).

Each year in August, FIRST Lego League Challenge teams are introduced to a scientific and real-world challenge for teams to focus and research on. The robotics part of the competition involves designing and programming Lego Education robots to complete tasks. The innovation project part of the competition involves the students working out a solution to a problem related to the theme (changes every year). The students first meet for regional, national and international tournaments to compete, share their knowledge, compare ideas, and display their robots.

The FIRST Lego League Challenge is a partnership between, FIRST and the Lego Group. It is the third division of FIRST Lego League, following FIRST Lego League Discover for ages 4-6 and FIRST Lego League Explore for ages 6-10. In March 2026, FIRST and LEGO Education announced that the partnership would conclude at the end of the 2026-2027 season.

== Competition details ==
At the beginning of the competition season, FIRST sends a set of official competition materials to each registered team, consisting of a 'challenge mat', LEGO electronic and mechanical components, and instructions for building the items for the mat (collectively known as the Challenge Set, formerly the Field Setup Kit). The teams also receive a list of tasks, called 'missions', to complete involving each model on the mat (e.g. taking a loose piece from one model and placing it inside another). The FIRST LEGO League Challenge gives teams complete freedom on how to complete the missions, providing that they are completed by a programmed LEGO Education robot with no outside assistance. The robot has two and a half minutes to complete the missions; called the Robot Game. Each team has a minimum build period of 8 weeks to analyze the challenge mat, design and build a LEGO Education robot, and program it to fulfill the given missions in any manner they see fit. The robot must be autonomous, and may contain only one LEGO Education programmable block and no more than four motors.

In addition to the live robot run, or Robot Game, the competition has three additional judged sections with the purpose of providing teams with feedback on their achievement of the FIRST LEGO League Challenge learning objectives. The first judging session, Core Values, is designed to determine how the team works together and uses the FIRST LEGO League Core Values in everything they do, which include inspiration, teamwork, Gracious Professionalism, and Coopertition. In addition to discussing how their team exhibits these values, teams may also be asked to perform a teamwork activity, usually timed, to see how the team works together to solve a new problem. Secondly, in the Robot Design, or technical judging, the team demonstrates the mechanical design, programming, and strategy/innovation of their robot. The goal of this judging session is to see what the robot “should” do during the Robot Game. Thirdly, in the Innovation Project, the students must give a 5-minute presentation on the research of a topic related to the current challenge. The required steps of the project as teams to first identify a problem that is related to the topic of that year's competition, then create an innovative solution to their identified problem by modifying something that already exists or creating something completely new (an "innovative solution"), and then they must share that solution with others, such as real-world professionals who have expertise in the annual challenge theme.

=== Table performance ===
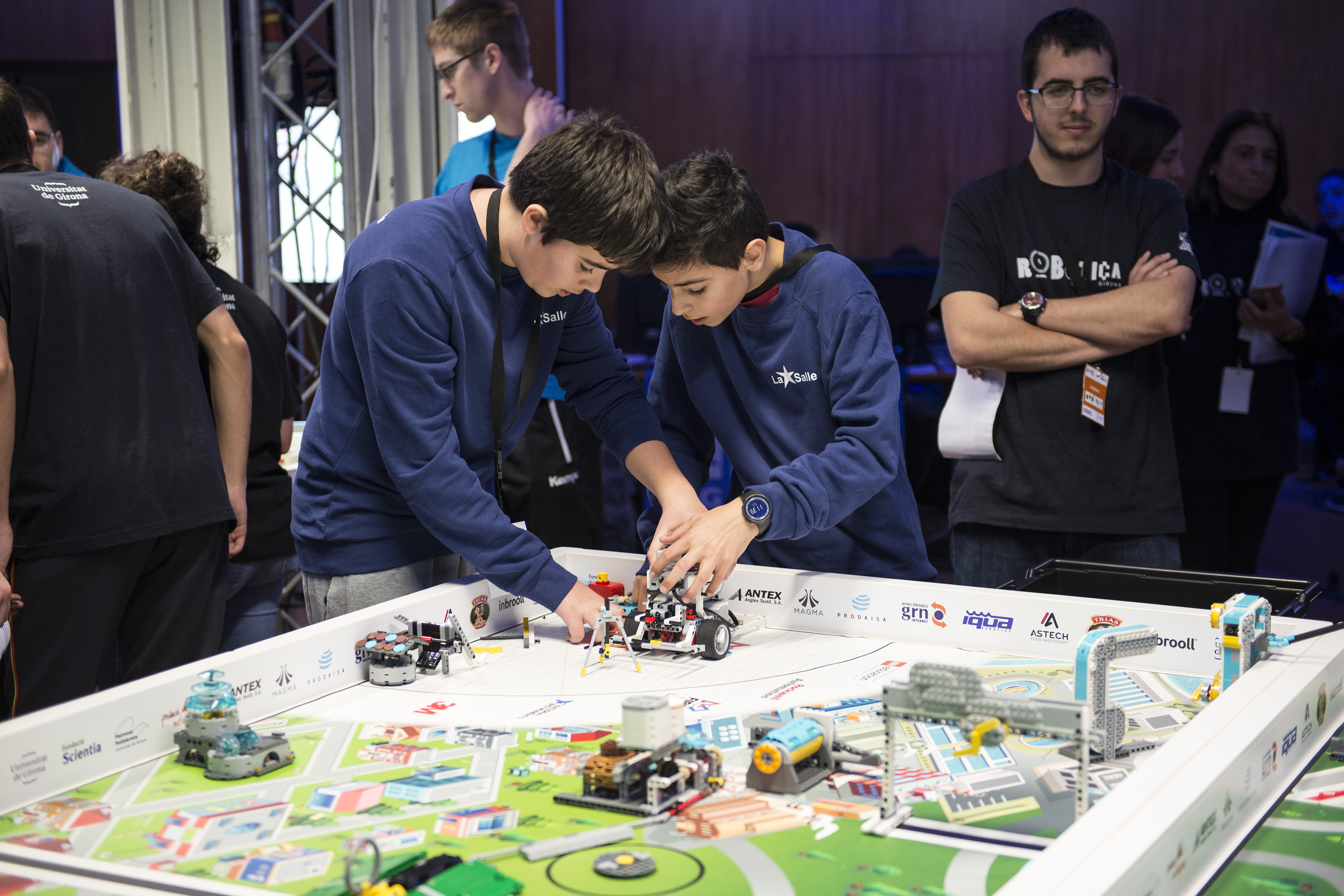
Team members set up their autonomous built for the 2017 Hydro Dynamics playing field.

When the official competition convenes, each team brings their robot to compete on an official challenge mat identical to their own. Two to four team members are allowed at the board during a match; however, they can switch out with others in the team. In the case of a serious problem, such as the entire robot breaking down, the entire team is allowed at the board for as long as the problem persists. Members are not permitted to bring additional robots or any other items to the board during the competition.

The robot starts in one of two areas marked as 'base', a white area in each bottom corner of the mat. While at base, two team members are allowed to touch the robot and start programs. If the team touches the robot outside of base (an 'interruption'), the referee will issue a penalty, resulting in the removal of a Precision Token. These are stationary LEGO models that increase the final score if they remain until the end, providing an incentive to not interrupt the robot. The robot is not required to return to base; some teams have completed all their missions without returning to base during the time allowed to complete the missions. In fact, in the 2008–09, 2009–10, 2011-13 and 2021 challenges, points were awarded if the robot was in one of two specified areas, not including base, at the end of the two and a half minute match.

=== Parts and Robotic platforms ===
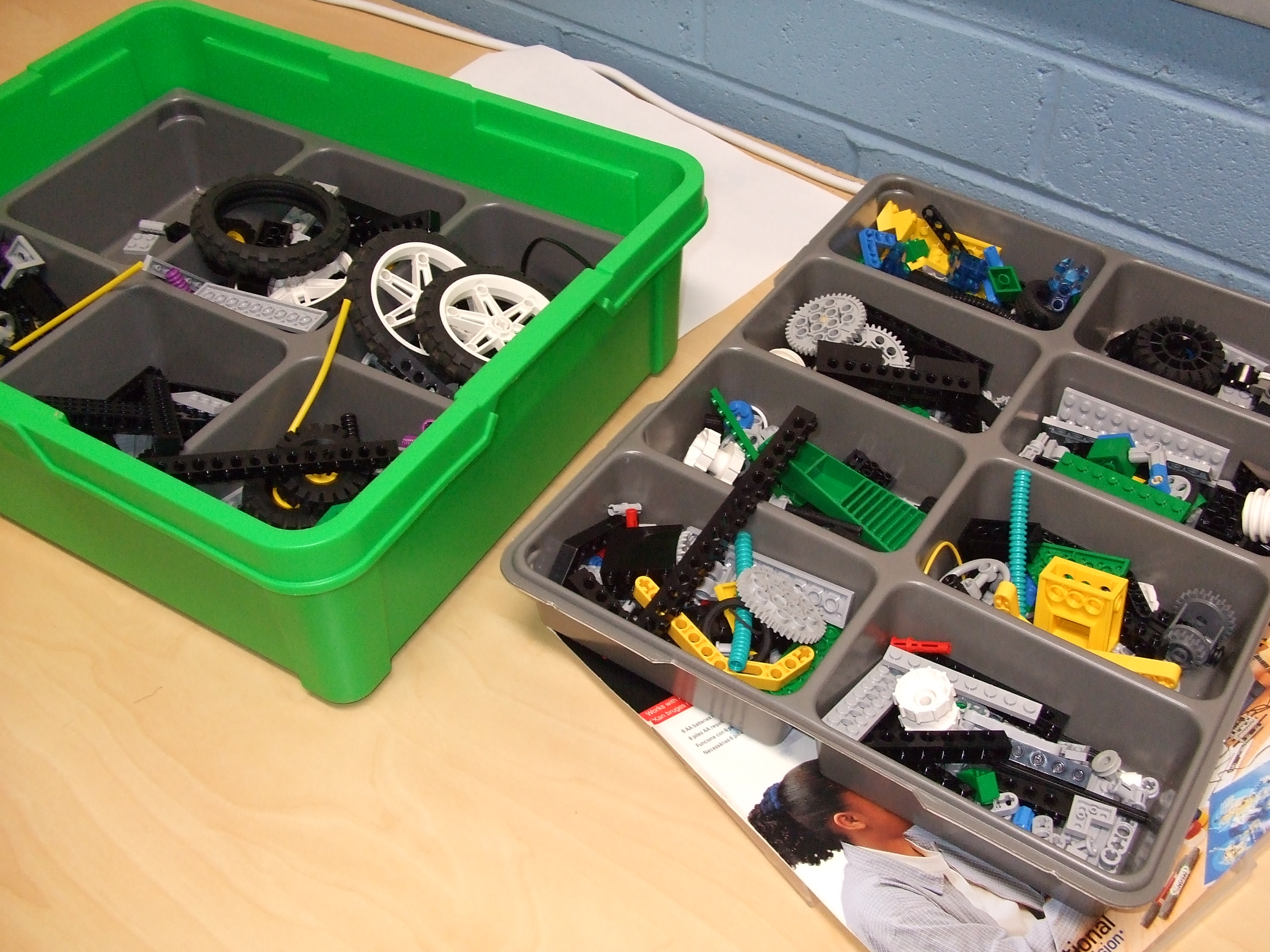
Participants build robots with kits such as these.

FIRST LEGO League Challenge teams may use "any LEGO-made building parts in their original factory condition" to construct their robots. The robots are programmed using any language allowing autonomous movement. Many teams use the official LEGO Education SPIKE software, which supports block-based programming and Python. Earlier teams used the EV3 software, NXT-G, or Robolab, with ROBOLAB being based on LabVIEW.

The robots used are Lego Education units. Until 2021, the platform of choice was the Lego Mindstorms EV3. From 2022, SPIKE Prime became the main platform used in FIRST LEGO League Challenge.

From 2026, FIRST LEGO League also introduced a new robotic platform based on LEGO Education Computer Science & AI kits as part of its Future Edition, while SPIKE-based competitions continue under the Founders Edition.

== Events ==
Teams in different parts of the world have different times allotted to complete the construction of the robot due to the varying date of qualifying tournaments but must have a minimum of 8 weeks from "Global Challenge Release" (the date, usually in August, by which the details of the missions and research project become available to the public). They go on to compete in FIRST LEGO League Challenge tournaments, similar to the FIRST Robotics Competition regionals. The initial levels of competition are managed by an Affiliate Partner Organization (commonly affiliated Universities), who are led by an Affiliate or Operational Partner Representative ("The Partner"). The Partner has complete control over all official tournaments in their region. Region boundaries are set by FIRST. Some States represent an entire region, while others, like Central Florida, represent a mix of Counties within the State. Most Partners have a two-tier system; teams first go to a "Qualifier", and if they meet certain criteria and perform well in all three judged areas, they can receive a bid to advance to the next level of competition, which is most often a Regional-Level event. Certain territories have 3-tiers and may also employ a State Championship.

The largest single-day regional qualifying tournament is hosted by First State Robotics and First State FIRST LEGO League in Wilmington, Delaware. Taking place every January, this event holds FIRST LEGO League Explore, FIRST LEGO League Challenge, FIRST Tech Challenge, FIRST Robotics Competition, and robot sumo competitions under one roof at the University of Delaware's Bob Carpenter Center. Teams from Eastern Pennsylvania, Southern New Jersey, Delaware, and Maryland (among other regions) attend this tournament to make it the largest single-day FIRST event in the world.

=== FIRST Championship ===
The only competition run by FIRST is the FIRST Championship In 2007, 96 teams competed in the FIRST LEGO League World Festival in Atlanta, Georgia on April 27–30. The 2007–08 Power Puzzle FIRST LEGO League World Festival and the 2008–09 FIRST LEGO League World Festival on Climate Connections were held again in the Georgia Dome and Georgia World Congress Center. Starting with 2010–11, FIRST LEGO League World Festival is held at the Edward Jones Dome and America's Center in St. Louis. In 2016, FIRST announced that they were expanding the FIRST Championship to two back-to-back events. Through 2020, these events will be held first in Houston, Texas at the George R. Brown Convention Center and the following week in Detroit, Michigan at the Cobo Center.

Additionally, top-performing teams from the highest level of regional/state competition may be nominated to participate in one of the Open Championships (also called "Invitationals"), which are organized by FIRST LEGO League Challenge Partners.

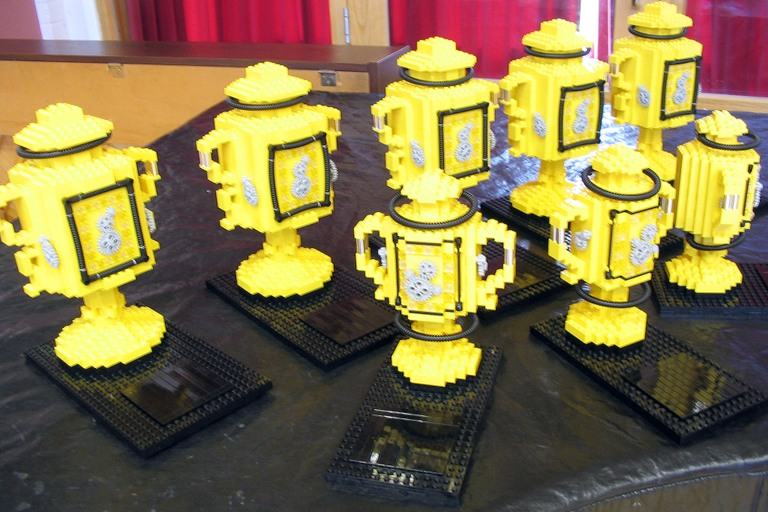
Trophies made of LEGO blocks for FIRST LEGO League 2005 regional winners.

With the exception of Local Awards (a special recognition designed by that region's Partner), the Rookie Award, which recognizes a team for whose this is their first year competing and displayed extraordinary achievements, the Judges Award, which recognizes a team that displays much achievement, but did not qualify for any typical award, and the Robot Performance Award, which recognizes the team with the single highest numeric robot performance score at that particular event, teams are only allowed to win one award at any particular event.

=== Global Innovation Award ===
Officially registered teams can also be nominated by their region for the Global Innovation Award, where they could win a grant to make their innovative solution to the annual challenge theme's problem a reality. As of the Animal Allies Season, the First Place team wins $20,000 and two other Finalists each win $5,000. The money can be used to further the team's ideas or to continue in FIRST programs. All three finalist teams also receive a LEGO Mindstorms Education EV3 Robot Set. All submissions are reviewed by a panel of judges consisting of experts from engineering and industrial fields as well as experts in the challenge theme for that year. Teams are judged on problem identification, innovation, implementation, and effective use of STEM principles. From all of the teams nominated by every FIRST LEGO League Challenge region, twenty teams are selected as semi-finalists and are invited to attend the Global Innovation Award Celebration in San Jose (formerly in Washington, D.C.) At this event, the teams present to a panel of judges, and the first place and other finalist teams winning the cash prizes are announced.

== Notable people ==
=== Alumni ===
Teresa Paneque

Valentina Muñoz Rabanal

=== Employees and Volunteers ===
Ruthe Farmer

Felienne Hermans

Anima Patil-Sabale

== Challenges ==
The challenges for the FIRST LEGO League Challenge are annually themed based on a real world problem:

Year	Theme	Number of Participants	Number of Teams	Number of Events	Summary of Challenge Theme
1999-2000	FIRST Contact	9,500	960		It focused around a group of astronauts stranded in a space station; missions included pulling a lever to allow the astronauts into a chamber and delivering oxygen (foam balls) to different sections of the playing field.
2000-2001	Volcanic Panic	15,000	1,540		In this challenge, robots had to complete challenges prior to the eruption of a volcano, such as rescuing a stranded scientist, barricading a village from lava rocks, deploying a gas sensor, and retrieving crates of samples, among other volcano-related tasks.
2001-2002	Arctic Impact	18,500	1,902		Robots had to complete tasks on an Arctic-themed board such as retrieving medicine barrels, and rescuing minifigure scientists from polar bears.
2002-2003	City Sights	27,009	3,001		Robots completed tasks such as clearing rocks off a soccer field, harvesting and delivering food loops, collecting toxic barrels, activating a windmill, and other city-related tasks.
2003-2004	Mission Mars	42,000	4,331		Inspired by the year's Mars Rover mission, competing teams had to design and construct robots to solve a number of problems like removing rocks from a 'solar panel' to ensure a Mars base energy supply, collect 'soil/rock samples' from the Martian desert landscape, etc.
2004-2005	No Limits	50,000	5,859		Centered around various robotic assistant systems for disabled persons, robots demonstrate how the systems are (hopefully) able to solve the given problems in a satisfying way.
2005-2006	Ocean Odyssey	75,000+	7,501	366	Involved marine-themed tasks such as mapping a sunken ship, deploying a research submarine, and cleaning up a shipping spill.
2006-2007	Nano Quest	88,000+	8,847	454	The challenge is developing anything using nanotechnology that improves or makes life easier from medicine to computers to the environment. There were 9 missions.
2007-2008	Power Puzzle	100,000+	10,941		The challenge is on alternative energy and features tasks such as moving power lines, fuel sources and planting trees.
2008-2009	Climate Connections	137,000+	13,705	542+	The challenge focuses on the Earth's past, present, and future climate. Students must research a climate problem occurring in their area, find a solution, then share it. They also have to research another area which has the same problem as their area. Featured moving balls, bicycles, computers, setting up levees, etc.
2009-2010	Smart Move	147,000+	14,725	542+	The challenge centers around efficient transportation, and teams are to solve a particular problem with the mode of transportation that they have chosen. The robot game includes activating access markers, collecting loops, toggling a lever to move a truck, avoid warning beacons, parking at one of two specified locations, etc.
2010-2011	Body Forward		16,720	643+	Explore the cutting-edge world of biomedical engineering to discover innovative ways to repair injuries, overcome genetic predispositions, and maximize the body's potential, with the intended purpose of leading happier and healthier lives. The robot game includes moving bionic eyes to the upper body, separating red and white blood cells, opening a door, and more.
2011-2012	Food Factor	183,000 (est.)	18,323	651	Improving the quality of food by finding ways to prevent food contamination. The missions include removing bacteria, delivering food, and refrigeration.
2012-2013	Senior Solutions	204,000 (est.)	20,430	1,022	Improve and maintain the quality of life of senior citizens.
2013-2014	Nature's Fury	237,000 (est.)	23,748	1,130	Explore the awe-inspiring storms, quakes, waves and more that we call natural disasters. Teams will discover what can be done when intense natural events meet the places people live, work, and play.
2014-2015	World Class	210,000 (est.)	26,044	1,274	Redesign how we gather knowledge and skills in the 21st century. This includes learning any kind of skill at any age.
2015-2016	Trash Trek	232,000 (est.)	29,034	1,407	Make less trash or improve the way people handle the trash we make.
2016-2017	Animal Allies	248,000 (est.)	31,079	1,407	It's all about helping our furry, feathered, and finned friends. Improve the way that people and animals interact. What might become possible when we learn to help each other?
2017-2018	Hydro Dynamics	280,000 (est.)	35,033	1,423	On your mark, get set, flow! Learn all about water – how we find, transport, use, or dispose of it. This year's challenge focuses on missions related to water, such as deploying a water pump, and turning a faucet.
2018-2019	Into Orbit	281,120	35,140	1,531	The 2018/2019 FIRST® LEGO League season will transport your team into space, where you'll explore, challenge, and innovate in the vast expanse of space.
2019-2020	City Shaper	318,000	38,609		City Shaper focused on cities, and missions involved things such as putting a bat on a tree, resolving a traffic jam, and causing a wheelchair swing to swing. This was a unique year as competition rules changed, a “home area” was created and for the first time contestants were asked to stop on the map, or the bridge on the map in this case. This allowed for two tables to have what was called “A battle for the bridge.” Robots that only went up the bridge on one table were rewarded the points associated with the bridge. If both robots went up the bridge, points were awarded to the robot who was positioned higher up on the bridge.
2020-2021	RePlay	120,144			This was a hybrid competition that focused on health and sports. Missions involved things such as pushing a minifigure down a slide. This was the first season to use LEGO Education SPIKE Prime parts.
2021-2022	Cargo Connect	225,300+			This competition focuses on cargo transport. Missions include taking cargo from a cargo plane and dropping crates from a helicopter.
2022-2023	SUPERPOWERED	280,300+			For the first time, 2 home areas were added, teams will explore where energy comes from, and how it is distributed, stored, and used.
2023-2024	MasterPiece	333,000+			Focuses on how to use art and technology to express your hobbies and interest.
2024-2025	Submerged	360,000+			Focuses on marine exploration and discovery of the ocean with the help of innovative realistic solutions.
2025-2026	Unearthed				Uncover the past to discover the future. In archaeology-inspired robotics season each tool, each innovation, each work of art connects us to the people and ideas that came before us.
2026-2027	Bioglow				

Nanoquest logo

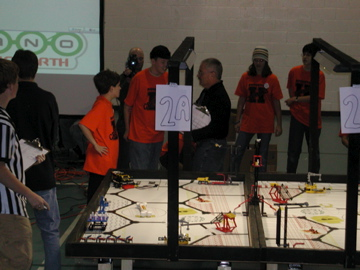
Nano Quest field

== See also ==
- RoboCup Junior
- LEGO Robotics
