= FIRST Lego League Explore =

Robotics program for children

- Sport: Robotics-related games
- Founder: Dean Kamen
- First season: 2004
- Country: International
- Related competitions: FIRST Robotics Competition; FIRST Tech Challenge; FIRST Lego League Challenge
- Website: www.firstlegoleague.org

FIRST Lego League Explore (FLLE) (formerly known as FIRST Lego League Jr.) is a non-competitive robotics program designed for children ages six to ten. It is one of the programs established by FIRST.

FIRST Lego League Explore follows the same theme given to the FIRST Lego League Challenge. While FIRST Lego League Challenge teams conduct research projects and design autonomous robots specifically to carry out missions relating to the topic, FIRST Lego League Explore teams conduct much smaller projects and make models out of Lego elements to illustrate one part of the theme. They may also use Lego Education SPIKE Essential set, a programmable robotics kit, as part of their models.

Currently, the program is available in 33 countries.

== History ==
FIRST Lego League Explore started out as a pilot program in 2004 to encourage young children to have interest in science and engineering. In the first pilot year, the teams were provided with some specific Lego parts by FIRST, but that idea was dropped in later years. Teams now use any Lego elements that they have to build the models. The pilot years were done in three phases from 2004 to 2006. The program was officially launched in 2007 during the Power Puzzle season.

During the first five years, the program was not referred as a robotic program. The only requirements to build models out of Lego elements were to have some moving parts and include at least one simple machine based on a given topic of that year. FIRST has provided an option to purchase a FIRST Lego League Explore Base Kit that contains many Lego elements including gears, motor, and other Lego Technic elements. In 2009, with the new robotics kit by Lego Group, the program included Lego WeDo as an optional kit which allows children to connect a motor and/or a sensor to other Lego bricks, gears and other technic elements. It also has drag-and-drop programming interface for children to write robotics programs.

The number of participants has been increasing each year. However, the program was limited to the United States and Canada until 2009.

== Program details ==
FIRST Lego League Explore is designed to be a non-competitive and community-based program. The teams are formed within local community and participate in local events. FIRST provides guidelines to help coaches to run their teams and local organizers to run FLLE events. However, FIRST does not organize any FLLE events, unlike other FIRST programs.

The program is designed to be flexible; there are no specific dates for the program. Each team may decide when to start the activities and for how long as long as the registration is done within the season calendar which is from August to June each year. A team consists of 2–6 team members. There is an age limit that team members must not be older than 9 as of January 1 of the year the Challenge is released. Although there is no lower bound on age, FIRST suggests that the program is intended for children 6 or older.

After registering a team, the coach guides students to do research by following the Challenge guideline. The team may have a field trip or visit experts to help children to learn more about the topic. Children will then work on their "Show Me" poster and Lego models to demonstrate their findings according to the instructions in the Challenge. The team may choose to use any Lego parts that they have at home to construct their models. Optionally, the team may purchase FIRST Lego League Explore Base Kit or Lego WeDo Kit to use.

== Challenges ==
The FIRST Lego League Explore challenges align with the research project portion of the FIRST Lego League Challenge.

Year	Theme	Number of Participants	Number of Teams	Number of Events	Notes
2004–2005	No Limits	375+	125	9	The first pilot year. The challenge was to find ways to improve access for people with different physical abilities.
2005–2006	Ocean Odyssey	981+	327	27	The second pilot year. The topic was related to learning about habitat of marine life
2006–2007	Nano Quest	3,500+	702	30	The third pilot year. The challenge provided an opportunity for children to learn about the scale of nanometer.
2007–2008	Power Puzzle	6,000+	1,004	40+	Official launch. The challenge was on energy. Children needed to perform an energy audit and seek answers about the source of energy for everyday appliances.
2008–2009	Climate Connections	7,000+	1,203	40+	Learn about tools used to study climate.
2009-2010	Smart Move		1,448		Relaunched as a robotics program. The first year to expand globally. The topic is about Transportation.
2010-2011	Body Forward		2,100+		Biomedical Engineering
2011-2012	Snack Attack	18,000	2,985	90+	Food safety
2012-2013	Super Seniors	20,000 (est.)	3,347	100+	Improve the quality of life for seniors
2013-2014	Disaster Blaster	24,000+	4,000+	100+	Help master natural disasters
2014-2015	Think Tank	34,000 (est.)	5,653	250	There's always something new to learn
2015-2016	Waste Wise	48,000 (est.)	8,031	300+	Prepare to become Waste Wise!
2016-2017	Creature Craze	64,000 (est.)	10,655	400+	About animals and the animal kingdom
2017-2018	Aqua Adventure	99,000 (est.)	16,425	450+	Water use and water's journey
2018-2019	Mission Moon	130,300	21,718	984	Building a Moon base and living on the Moon
2019-2020	Boomtown Build	163,000+	21,703		Explore the needs of a community and design a building for the town.
2020-2021	Playmakers	67,872			Improve the games and place spaces of tomorrow.
2021-2022	Cargo Connect	115,600+			First year since 2010 that had the same game name as FIRST Lego League Challenge. Explore how cargo is transported, sorted, and distributed.
2022-2023	Superpowered	156,500+			Teams will explore where energy comes from and how it is distributed, stored, and used.
2023-2024	Masterpiece	189,000+			Teams explore the intersection of STEM and creativity.
2024-2025	Submerged	213,000+			Teams explore the layers of the ocean and bring their learnings and ideas to the surface as they “sea” into the future.
2025-2026	Unearthed				Teams investigate the past, build and explore an archeological dig site, and learn about the tools used by archeologists.

== Events ==
=== Concept ===
The program encourages teams to go out and tell their story to others after they have completed the poster and the models. They may participate in one of the well-established FIRST Lego League Explore events, which are typically part of FIRST Lego League Challenge tournaments run by independent FIRST Lego League Challenge partners. Most of these events are called FIRST Lego League Explore Expos. Alternately, they may host their own event in the neighborhood or at school to showcase their accomplishment.

At the FIRST Lego League Explore event, there will be "Reviewers" (the judges) to ask children some questions about what they have learned. They may be asked for details about the project and the models that they built. The FIRST Lego League Explore concept is that everyone is a winner, therefore, the event organizers are recommended to give an award to each team that participates in the event.

=== Awards ===
Awards are given out for the following:

- Diligent Learning: for special learning commitment and eagerness to try things out
- Fabulous Decoration: for a beautiful model with many decorative elements
- Sturdy Design: for extensive construction knowledge and a stable model
- Unique Team Spirit: for team cohesion and mutual support
- Outstanding Ideas: for great model ideas and an eye-catching research poster
- Imaginative Construction: for a creative design with high-quality elements
- Difficult Situation: for mastering difficulties and improvisation skills
- Incredible Movement: for unique movement of the model
- Gracious Professionalism: for helpfulness, friendliness, and respect towards others.

=== Notable events ===
Since the inception of the program, FIRST Lego League Explore events have been held by local organizers or official FIRST Lego League Explore partners in the participating countries, but not by FIRST headquarters. FIRST holds an annual event called the FIRST Lego League Explore World Festival Expo each year as part of the FIRST Championship, in Houston, Texas.

== See also ==
- FIRST
- FIRST Lego League Challenge
