= Lichfield =

Cathedral city in Staffordshire, England

Coordinates: 52.682°N 1.829°W

- City
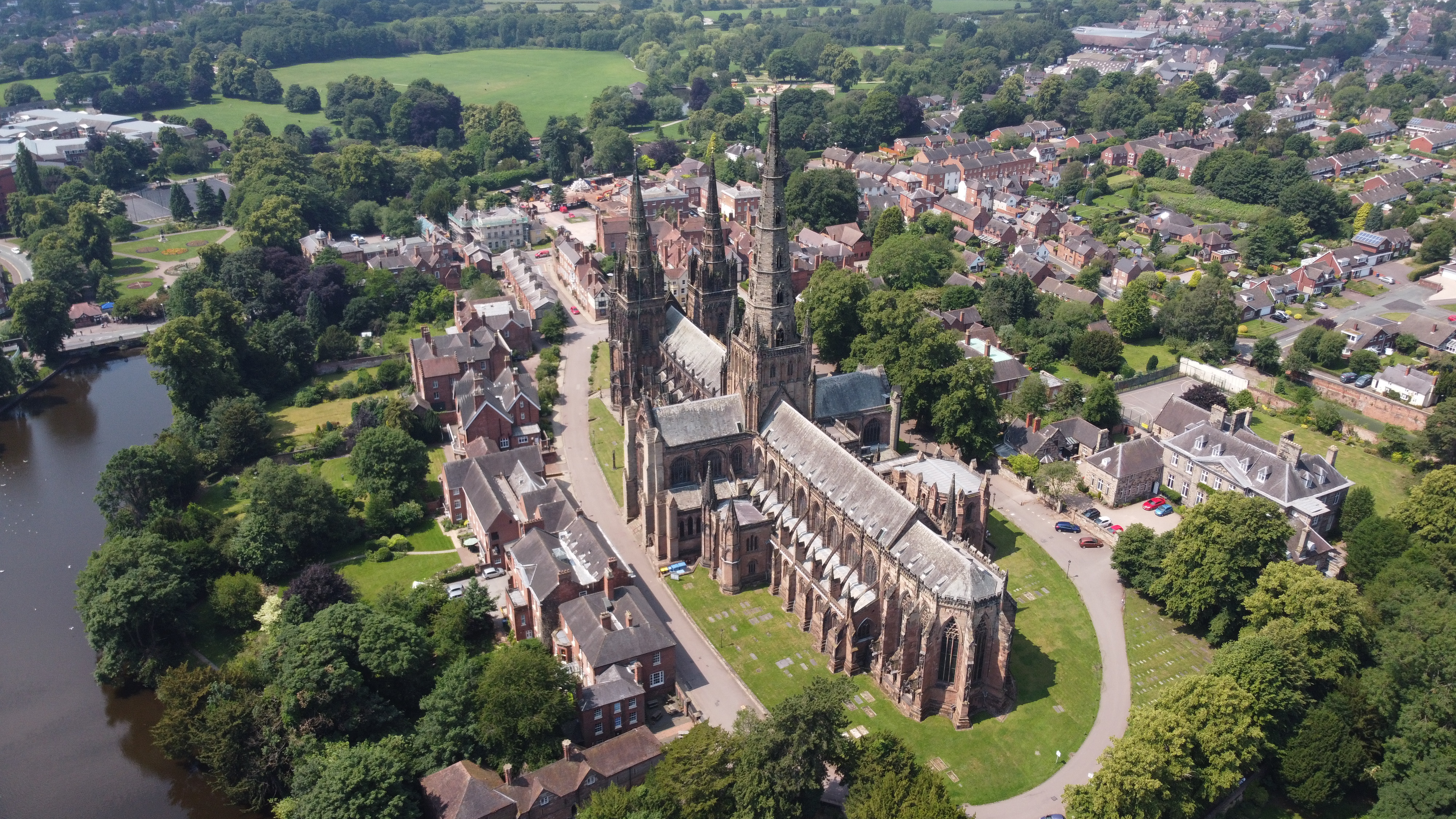
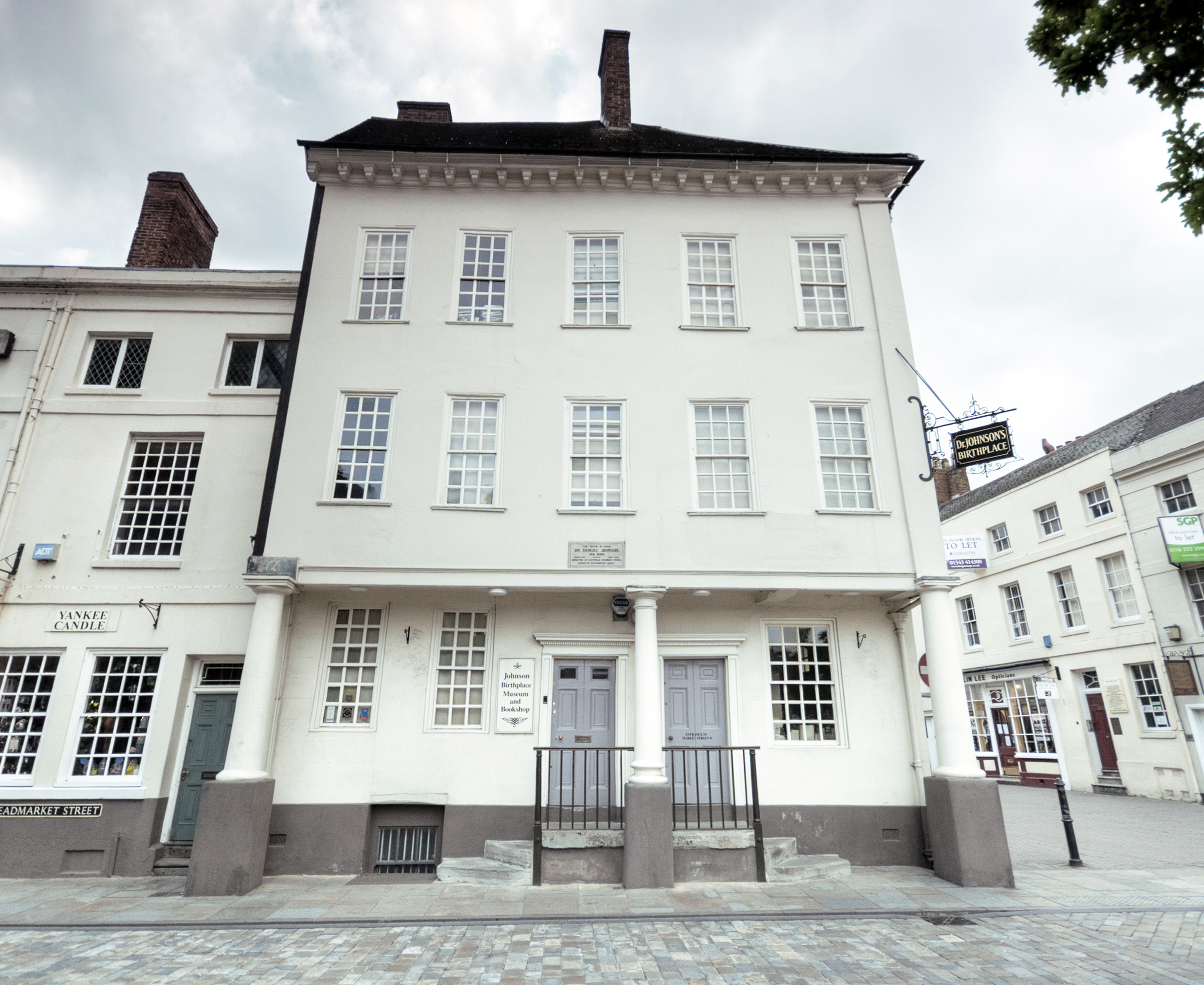
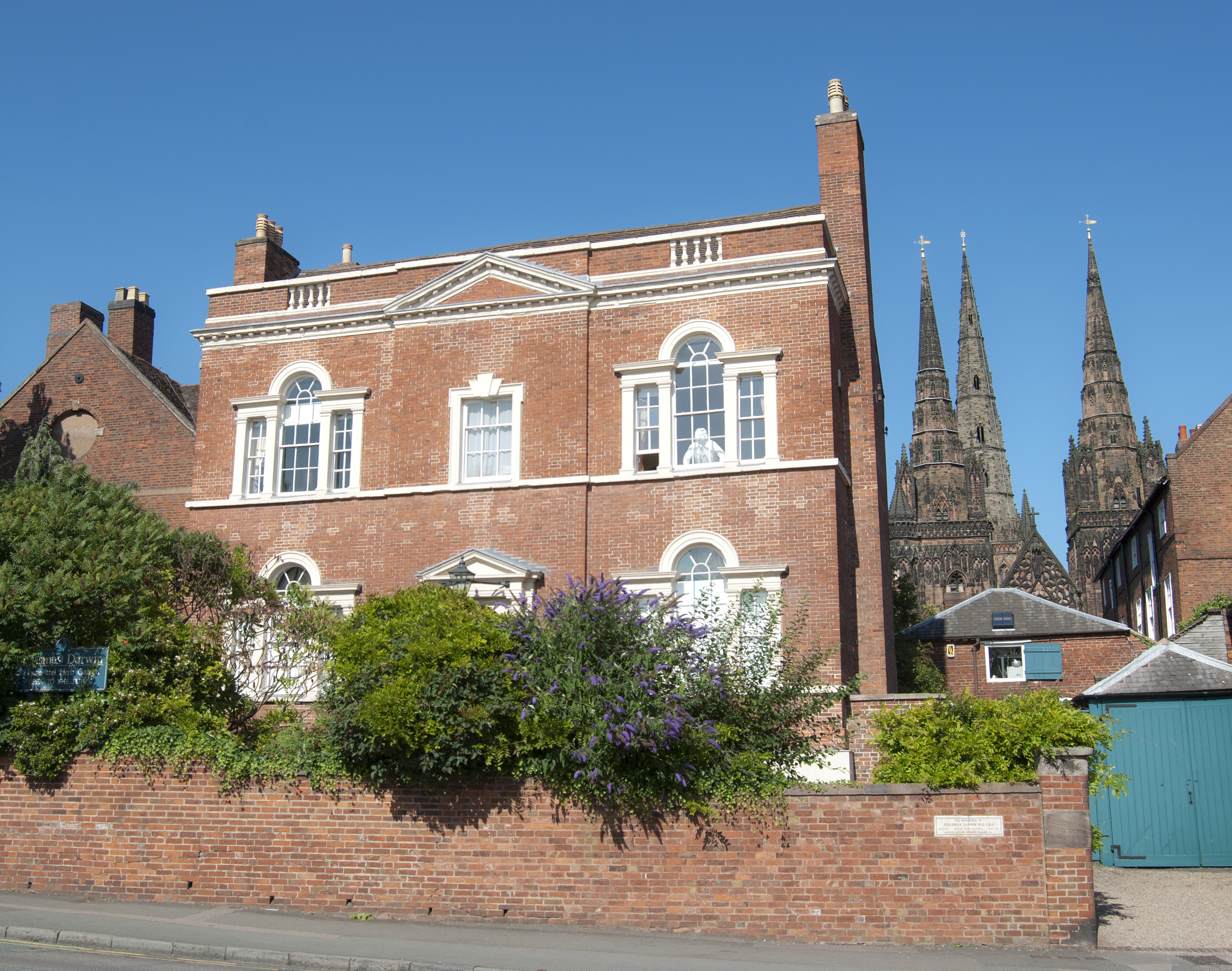
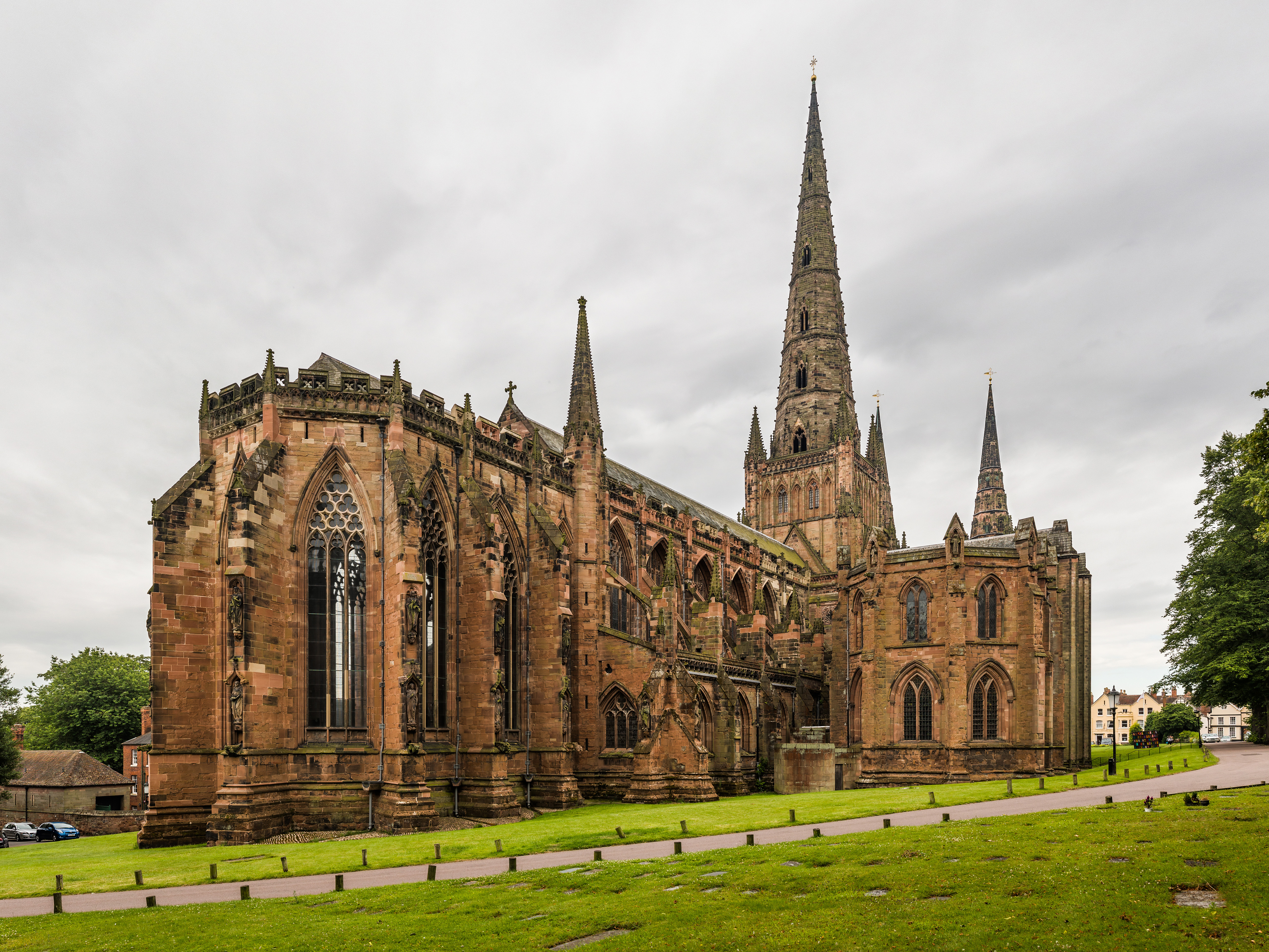
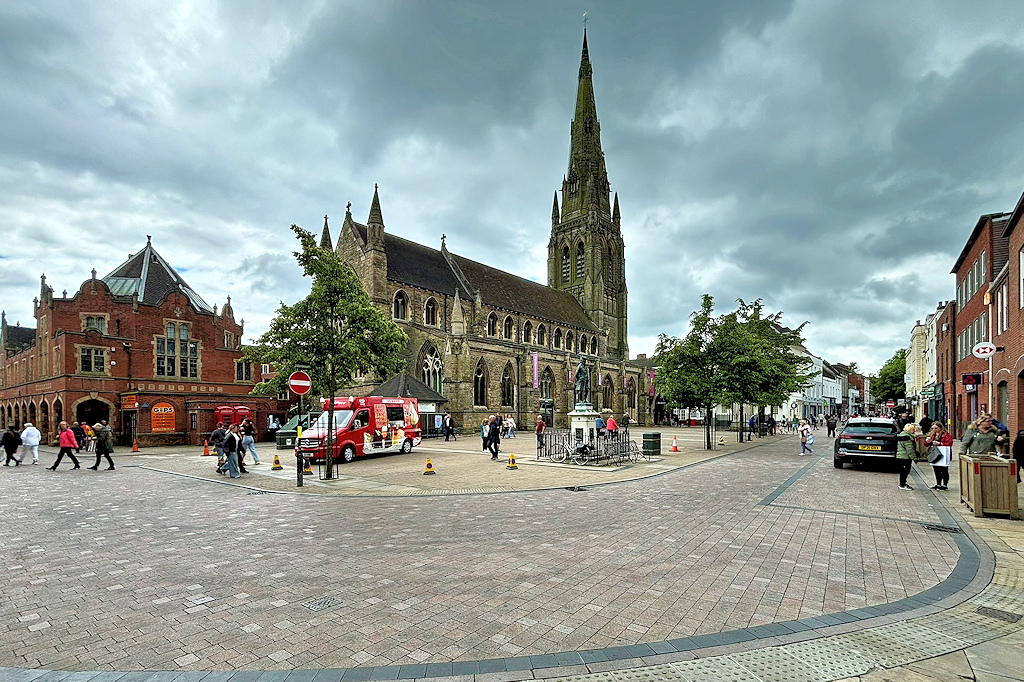
- Aerial view of Lichfield Samuel Johnson Museum Erasmus Darwin House Cathedral Market Square

- Coat of arms

- Location within Staffordshire
- Interactive map of Lichfield
- Area: 14.02 km^{2} (5.41 sq mi)
- Population: 34,738 (2021)
  - Density: 2,478/km^{2} (6,420/sq mi)
- Demonym: Lichfieldian
- OS grid reference: SK115097
  - London: 121 miles (195 km) NNW
- Civil parish: Lichfield
- District: Lichfield
- Shire county: Staffordshire
- Region: West Midlands
- Country: England
- Sovereign state: United Kingdom
- Areas of the city: List: Boley Park; Chadsmead; Curborough; Darwin Park; Fradley; Leomansley; Pipehill; St Johns; Stowe; Streethay
- Post town: LICHFIELD
- Postcode district: WS13, WS14
- Dialling code: 01543
- Police: Staffordshire
- Fire: Staffordshire
- Ambulance: West Midlands
- UK Parliament: Lichfield
- Website: www.lichfield.gov.uk

Lichfield (/ˈlɪtʃfiːld/) is a cathedral city and civil parish in Staffordshire, England. It is situated 18 miles (29 km) south-east of Stafford, 9 miles (14 km) north-east of Walsall, 8 miles (13 km) north-west of Tamworth, 13 miles (21 km) south-west of Burton upon Trent and Derby, and 14 miles (22.5 km) north of Birmingham. At the time of the 2021 census, the population was 34,738 and that of the wider Lichfield District was 106,400.

Notable for its three-spired medieval cathedral, Lichfield was the birthplace of Samuel Johnson, the compiler of the first authoritative Dictionary of the English Language. The city's recorded history began when Chad of Mercia arrived to establish his bishopric in 669 AD and the settlement grew as the ecclesiastical centre of Mercia. In 2009, the Staffordshire Hoard, the largest hoard of Anglo-Saxon gold and silver metalwork, was found 4 mi (6.4 km) south-west of Lichfield.

The development of the city was consolidated in the 12th century under Roger de Clinton, who fortified the Cathedral Close and also laid out the town with the ladder-shaped street pattern that survives to this day. Lichfield's heyday was in the 18th century, when it developed into a thriving coaching city. This was a period of great intellectual activity; the city was the home of many famous people including Samuel Johnson, David Garrick, Erasmus Darwin and Anna Seward, prompting Johnson's remark that Lichfield was "a city of philosophers".

Today, the city still retains its old importance as an ecclesiastical centre, and its industrial and commercial development has been limited. The centre of the city has over 230 listed buildings (including many examples of Georgian architecture) and preserves much of its historic character.

== Toponymy ==
The origin of the modern name Lichfield is twofold. At Wall, 2.2 mi (3.5 km) south of the current city, there was a Romano-British village, Letocetum, a Common Brittonic place-name meaning "Grey wood", "grey" perhaps referring to varieties of tree prominent in the landscape, such as ash and elm. In the post-Roman period, Letocetum developed into Old Welsh Luitcoyt.

The earliest record of the name in English is the Vita Sancti Wilfredi of around 715, describing when Chad moved from York to Lichfield in 669. "Chad was made Bishop of the Mercians immediately after his deposition; Wilfred gave him the place (locus) at Lichfield (Onlicitfelda)". The prefix "on" indicates that the place given to Chad by Wilfrid was "in Lichfield", indicating the name was understood to apply to a region rather than a specific settlement. Bede's Ecclesiastical History of the English People, completed in 731, states that Chad acquired Licidfelth as his episcopal seat (sedem episcopalem).

These and later sources show that the name Letocetum had passed into Old English as Licid, to which was appended the Old English word feld ("open country"). This word Lyccidfeld is the origin of the word "Lichfield".

The modern-day city of Lichfield and the Roman villa of Letocetum are just 2 miles (3.2 km) apart. While these names are distinct in modern usage, they had a common derivation in the Brittonic original Letocaiton, indicating that "grey wood" referred to the region inclusive of modern-day Lichfield City and the Roman villa.

Popular etymology has it that a thousand Christians were martyred in Lichfield around AD 300 during the reign of Diocletian and that the name Lichfield actually means "field of the dead". (Note: See the Lichfield wiktionary page.) There is no evidence to support this legend.

== History ==
=== Prehistory and antiquity ===
The earliest evidence of settlement is Mesolithic flints discovered on the high ground of the cemetery at St Michael on Greenhill, which may indicate an early flint industry. Traces of Neolithic settlement have been discovered on the south side of the sandstone ridge occupied by Lichfield Cathedral.

The site of Letocetum{{efn|The Brittonic *Lētocaiton, "Greywood") lies 2.2 mi (3.5 km) south-west of Lichfield, near the point where Icknield Street crosses Watling Street. Established in AD 50 as a Roman military fortress, it had become a civilian settlement (vicus) with a bath house and a mansio by the 2nd century. Letocetum fell into decline by the 4th century and the Romans had left by the fifth century. There have been scattered Romano-British finds in Lichfield and it is possible that a burial discovered beneath the cathedral in 1751 was Romano-British. There is no evidence of what happened to Letocetum after the Romans left; however, Lichfield may have emerged as the inhabitants of Letocetum relocated during its decline. A Cair Luit Coyd ("Fort Greywood") was listed by Nennius among the 28 cities of Britain in his Historia Brittonum, although these were largely historic remembrances of early Sub-Roman Britain.

=== Middle Ages ===
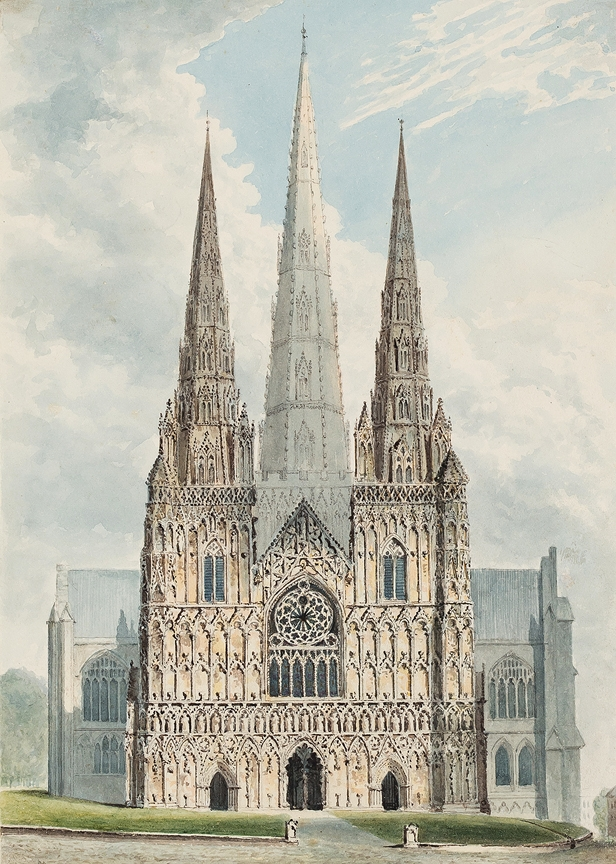
The three-spired Lichfield Cathedral was built between 1195 and 1249

St Michael's Churchyard in 1840

The early history of Lichfield is obscure. The first authentic record occurs in Bede's history, where it is called Licidfelth and mentioned as the place where St Chad fixed the episcopal see of the Mercians in 669. The first Christian king of Mercia, Wulfhere, donated land at Lichfield for Chad to build a monastery. It was because of this that the ecclesiastical centre of Mercia became settled as the Diocese of Lichfield, which was approximately 7 miles (11 km) north-west of the seat of the Mercian kings at Tamworth.

In July 2009, the Staffordshire Hoard, the largest collection of Anglo-Saxon gold ever found, was discovered in a field in the parish of Hammerwich, 4 mi (6.4 km) south-west of Lichfield; it was probably deposited in the 7th century.

The first cathedral was built on the present site in 700 when Bishop Hædde built a new church to house the bones of St Chad, which had become the centre of a sacred shrine to many pilgrims when he died in 672. The burial in the cathedral of the kings of Mercia, Wulfhere in 674 and Ceolred in 716, further increased the city's prestige. In 786 King Offa made the city an archbishopric with authority over all the bishops from the Humber to the River Thames; his appointee was Archbishop Hygeberht. This may have been motivated by Offa's desire to have an archbishop consecrate his son Ecgfrith as king, since it is possible Jænberht refused to perform the ceremony, which took place in 787. After King Offa's death in 796, Lichfield's power waned; in 803 the primacy was restored to Canterbury by Pope Leo III after only 16 years.

The Historia Brittonum lists the city as one of the 28 cities of Britain around AD 833.

During the ninth century, Mercia was devastated by Danish Vikings. Lichfield itself was unwalled and the cathedral was despoiled, so two centuries later Bishop Peter moved the see to the fortified and wealthier Chester in 1075. At the time of the Domesday Book survey (1086), Lichfield was held by the Bishop of Chester; it was listed as a small village. The lord of the manor was the Bishop of Chester until the reign of Edward VI.

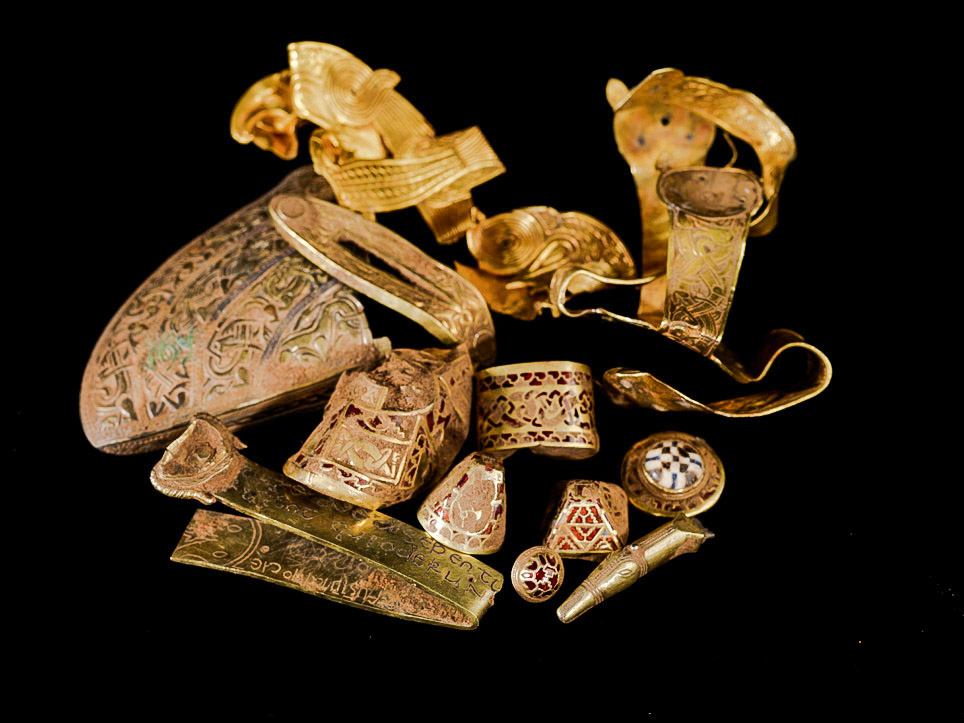
The Staffordshire Hoard was discovered in a field near Lichfield.

In 1102, Bishop Peter's successor, Robert de Limesey, transferred the see from Chester to Coventry. The Bishop of Coventry and Lichfield had seats in both locations; work on the present Gothic cathedral at Lichfield began in 1195. (Note: In 1837 the see of Lichfield acquired independent status and the style 'Bishop of Lichfield' was adopted.)

In 1153, a markets charter was granted by King Stephen and, ever since, weekly markets have been held in the Market Square.

Lichfield Cathedral in modern times

Bishop Roger de Clinton was responsible for transforming the scattered settlements to the south of Minster Pool into the ladder-plan streets existing today. Market Street, Wade Street, Bore Street and Frog Lane linked Dam Street, Conduit Street and Bakers Lane on one side with Bird Street and St John Street on the other. Bishop de Clinton also fortified the cathedral close and enclosed the town with a bank and ditch, and gates were set up where roads into the town crossed the ditch. In 1291, Lichfield was severely damaged by a fire which destroyed most of the town; however the Cathedral and Close survived unscathed.

In 1387, Richard II gave a charter for the foundation of the guild of St Mary and St John the Baptist; this guild functioned as the local government, until its dissolution by Edward VI, who incorporated the town in 1548.

=== Early Modern ===
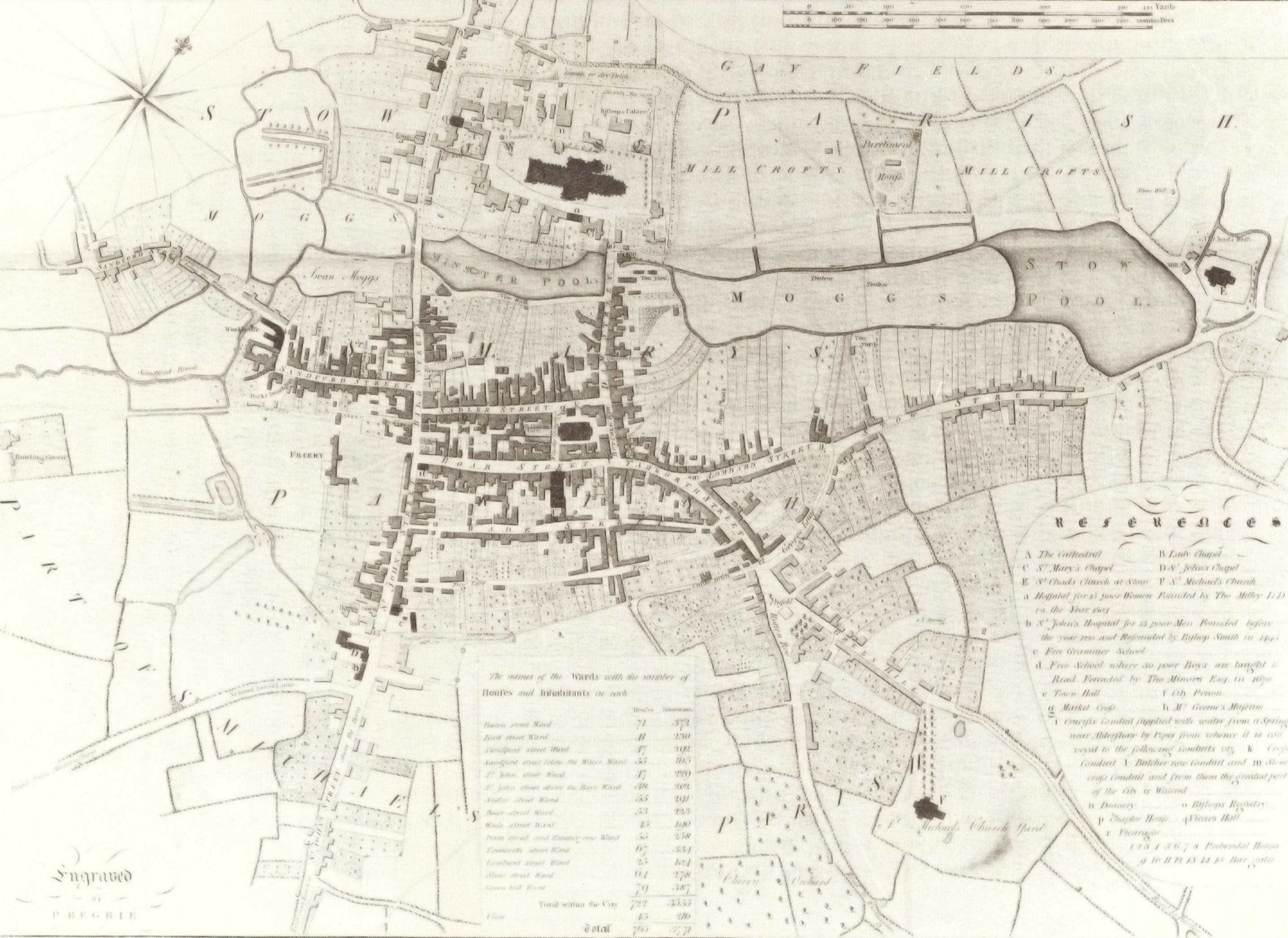
A map of Lichfield in 1781

The policies of Henry VIII had a dramatic effect on Lichfield. The Reformation brought the disappearance of pilgrim traffic following the destruction of St Chad's shrine in 1538, which was a major loss to the city's economic prosperity. That year too the Franciscan Friary was dissolved, the site becoming a private estate. Further economic decline followed the outbreak of plague in 1593, which resulted in the death of over a third of the entire population.

Three people were burned at the stake for heresy under Mary I. The last public burning at the stake for heresy in England took place in Lichfield, when Edward Wightman from Burton upon Trent was executed by burning in the Market Place on 11 April 1612 for promoting himself as the divine Paraclete and Saviour of the world.

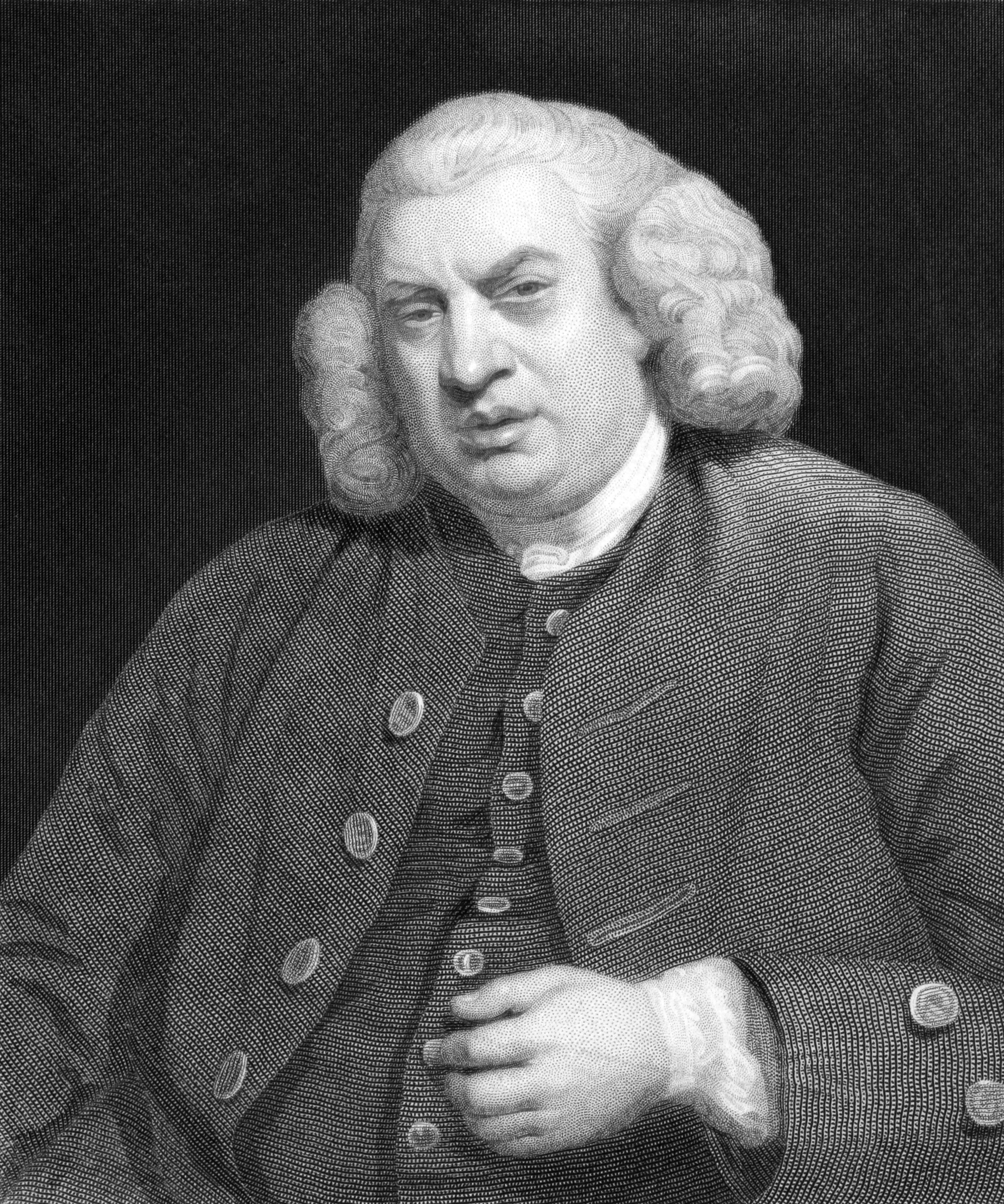
Samuel Johnson was born in Breadmarket Street in 1709

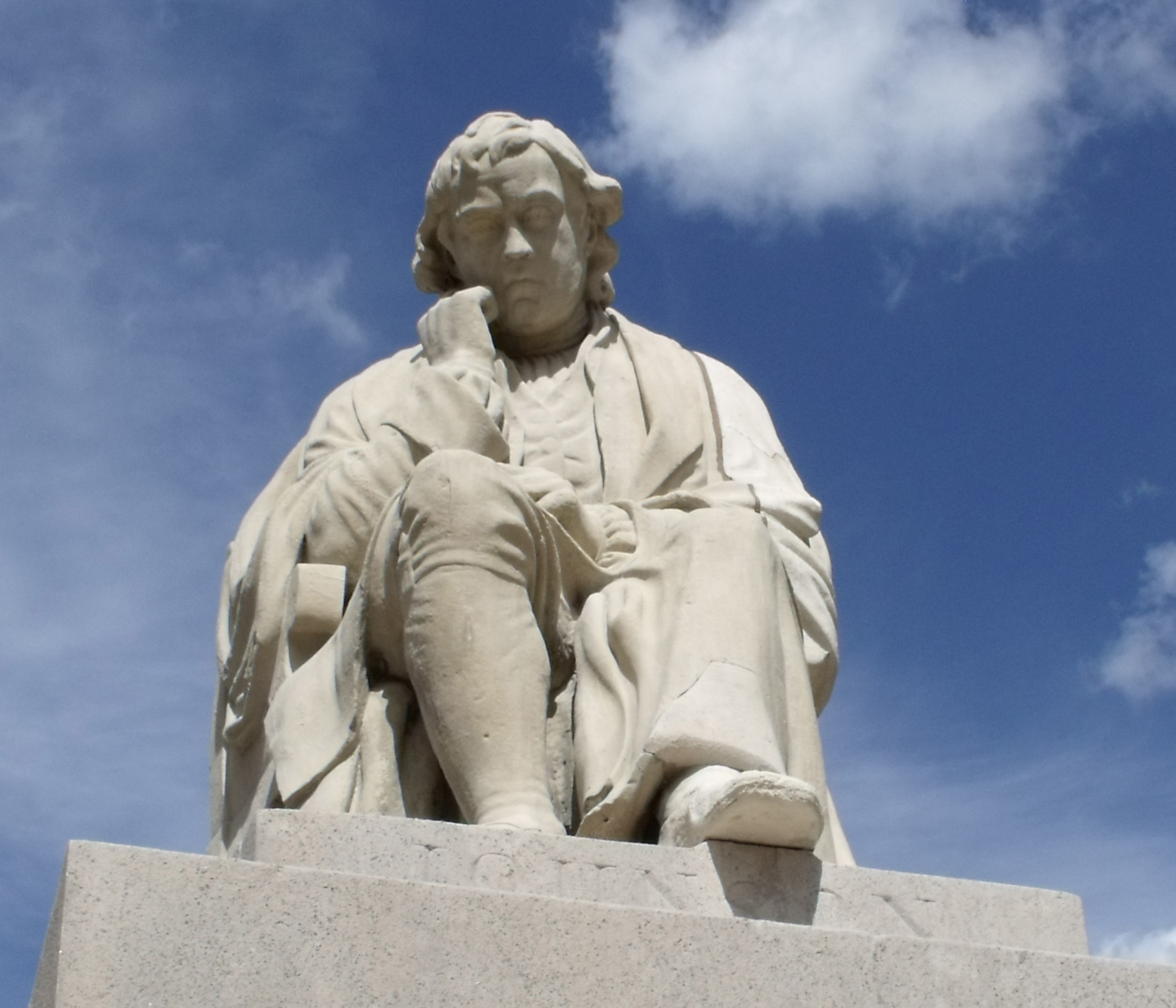
Statue of Dr Johnson in Market Square "The Doctor's statue, which is of some inexpensive composite painted a shiny brown, and of no great merit of design, fills out the vacant dullness of the little square in much the same way as his massive personality occupies—with just a margin for Garrick—the record of his native town."—Henry James, Lichfield and Warwick, 1872

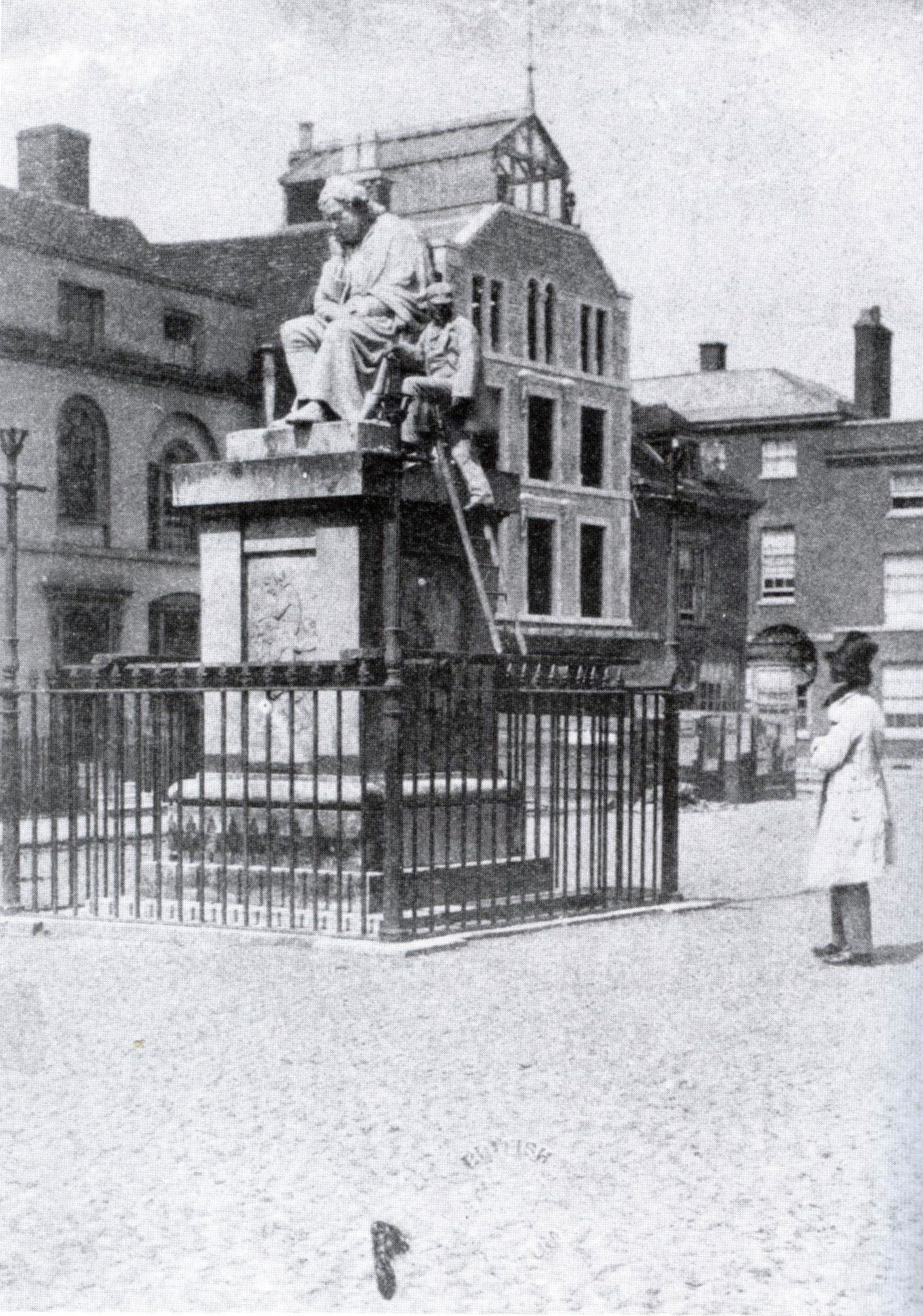
Photograph by Richard Cockle Lucas, sculptor of Johnson's statue (1859)

In the English Civil War, Lichfield was divided. The cathedral authorities, supported by some of the townsfolk, were for the king, but the townsfolk generally sided with the Parliament. This led to the fortification of the close in 1643. Lichfield's position as a focus of supply routes had an important strategic significance during the war, and both forces were anxious for control of the city. The Parliamentary commander Lord Brooke led an assault on the fortified close, but was killed by a sniper's bullet on St Chad's day in 1643. The close subsequently yielded to the Parliamentarians, but was retaken by Prince Rupert of the Rhine in the same year, and the governorship granted to a local gentleman, Richard Bagot. On the collapse of the Royalist cause in 1646 it again surrendered. The cathedral suffered extensive damage from the war, including the complete destruction of the central spire. It was restored at the Restoration under the supervision of Bishop Hacket, and thanks in part to the generosity of King Charles II.

Lichfield started to develop a lively coaching trade as a stop-off on the busy route between London and Chester from the 1650s onwards, making it Staffordshire's most prosperous town. In the 18th century, and then reaching its peak in the period from 1800 to 1840, the city thrived as a busy coaching city on the main routes from London to the north-west and Birmingham to the north-east. It also became a centre of great intellectual activity, being the home of many famous people including Samuel Johnson, David Garrick, Erasmus Darwin and Anna Seward; this prompted Johnson's remark that Lichfield was "a city of philosophers".

In the 1720s, Daniel Defoe described Lichfield as "a fine, neat, well-built, and indifferent large city", the principal town in the region after Chester. During the late 18th and early 19th century much of the medieval city was rebuilt with the red-brick Georgian style buildings still to be seen today. Also during this time, the city's infrastructure underwent great improvements, with underground sewerage systems, paved streets and gas-powered street lighting. An infantry regiment of the British Army was formed at Lichfield in 1705 by Col. Luke Lillingstone in the King's Head tavern in Bird Street. In 1751, it became the 38th Regiment of Foot, and in 1783 the 1st Staffordshire Regiment; after reorganisation in 1881, it became the 1st battalion of the South Staffordshire Regiment.

=== Late Modern and contemporary ===
The arrival of the Industrial Revolution and the railways in 1837 signalled the end of Lichfield's position as an important staging post for coaching traffic. While nearby Birmingham, and its population, expanded greatly during the Industrial Revolution, Lichfield remained largely unchanged in character.

The first council houses were built in the Dimbles area of the city in the 1930s. The outbreak of World War II brought over 2,000 evacuees from industrialised areas. However, due to the lack of heavy industry in the city, Lichfield escaped lightly, although there were air raids in 1940 and 1941 and three Lichfeldians were killed. Just outside the city, Wellington Bombers flew out of Fradley Aerodrome, which was known as RAF Lichfield. Following the war the council built many new houses in the 1960s, including some high-rise flats, while the late 1970s and early 1980s saw the construction of a large housing estate at Boley Park in the south-east of the city. The city's population tripled between 1951 and the late 1980s.

The city has continued expanding to the west. The Darwin Park housing estate has been under development for a number of years and has swelled the city's population by approximately 3,000. Plans were approved for Friarsgate, a new £100 million shopping and leisure complex opposite Lichfield City Station in 2011. The police station, bus station, Ford garage and multi-storey car park were to be demolished to make way for 22,000 m^{2} of retail space and 2,000 m^{2} of leisure facilities, consisting of a flagship department store, six-screen cinema, hotel, 37 individual shops and 56 flats. These plans have not gone ahead as of 2020 and new plans have been made for a cinema in the abandoned Debenhams building.

== Governance ==
=== Local government ===
Historically the Bishop of Lichfield had authority over the city. It was not until 1548, with Edward VI's charter, that Lichfield had any form of secular government. As a reward for the support given to Mary I by the bailiffs and citizens during the Duke of Northumberland's attempt to prevent her accession, the Queen issued a new charter in 1553, confirming the 1548 charter and in addition granting the city its own Sheriff. The same charter made Lichfield a county separate from the rest of Staffordshire and it remained so until 1888.

The city council (Note: Not to be confused with Lichfield District Council, which has authority over a wider area than Lichfield city.) has 28 members from the six wards of Boley Park, Chadsmead, Curborough, Leamonsley, St John's and Stowe, who are elected every four years. The Right Worshipful the Mayor of Lichfield is the civic head of the council and chairs council meetings. The council also appoints a Leader of Council to be the main person responsible for leadership of the council's political and policy matters. Lichfield is one of only 15 towns and cities in England and Wales which appoints a Sheriff.

=== National representation ===
The Lichfield constituency sent two members to the parliament of 1304 and to a few succeeding parliaments, but the representation did not become regular until 1552; in 1867 it lost one member, and in 1885 its representation was merged into that of the county. The Lichfield constituency was abolished in 1950 and replaced with Lichfield and Tamworth. This lasted until 1983, when it was replaced with the Mid Staffordshire constituency.

Based on the resident's location in Lichfield District, there are technically two constituencies. The current MP for Lichfield, including the whole of the city, is the Labour Politician Dave Robertson, who has been MP for Lichfield since the 2024 general election. Robertson won the seat from Conservative Michael Fabricant, who had held the seat since 1997, by a majority of 810.

Sarah Edwards was elected to the Tamworth constituency in a by-election in 2023 and held the seat in the 2024 general election. Chris Pincher was the previous MP until a highly publicised scandal in 2022 after which he had the Conservative whip revoked and subsequently sat as an independent, before announcing his resignation in September 2023.

== Geography ==
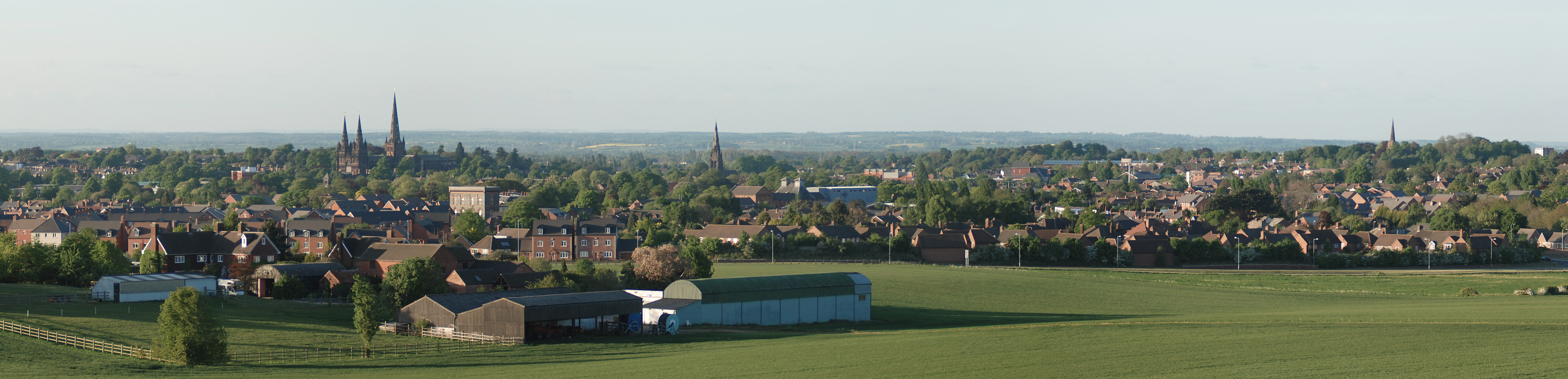
Panorama from Harehurst Hill 1.5 mi (2.4 km) south-west of the cathedral, showing Lichfield's distinctive five spires

Lichfield covers an area of approximately 5.41 sq mi (14.0 km^{2}) in the south-east of the county of Staffordshire, in the West Midlands region of England. It lies approximately 17 mi (27 km) north of Birmingham and 120 mi (200 km) north-west of London. The city is located between the high ground of Cannock Chase to the west and the valleys of the rivers Trent and Tame to the east.

It is underlain by red sandstone, deposited during the arid desert conditions of the Triassic period. Mercia Mudstone underlies the north and north-eastern edges of the city towards Elmhurst and Curborough. The red sandstone underlying the majority of Lichfield is present in many of its ancient buildings, including Lichfield Cathedral and the Church of St Chad.

The ground within the city slopes down from 116m in the north-west to 86m on the sandstone shelf where Lichfield Cathedral stands. To the south and east of the city centre is a ridge which reaches 103 m at St Michael on Greenhill. Boley Park lies on top of a ridge with its highest point on Borrowcop Hill at 113m. To the south-east the level drops to 69 m where Tamworth Road crosses the city boundary into Freeford. There is another high ridge south-west of the city where there are two high points, one at Berry Hill Farm at 123 m and the other on Harehurst Hill near the city boundary at Aldershawe where the level reaches 134 m.

The city is built on the two sides of a shallow valley, into which flow two streams from the west, the Trunkfield Brook and the Leamonsley Brook, and out of which the Curborough Brook runs to the north-east, eventually flowing into the Trent. The two streams have been dammed south of the cathedral on Dam Street to form Minster Pool and near St Chad's Road to form Stowe Pool.

=== Suburbs ===
Lichfield has a number of suburbs including Boley Park, Chadsmead, Christ Church, Darwin Park, The Dimbles, Leomonsley, Nether Stowe, Sandfields, Stowe, Streethay and Trent Valley. A major recent residential development is Darwin Park, to the immediate south-west of the city centre. Designed by the architectural practice BHB in the early 21st century, it provides mixed housing together with a range of community facilities. The development is named after Erasmus Darwin, who was born and grew up in Lichfield, and who is commemorated with a sculpture on Cathedral Walk, a footpath which offers a direct traffic-free connection between Darwin Park and Lichfield city centre.

=== Demography ===
At the time of the 2021 census, the population of the City of Lichfield was 34,738. The population was 96.5% white and 66.5% Christian; 51% of the population over 16 were married; 64% were employed; and 21% of the people were retired. All of these figures were higher than the national average.

Population growth of the City of Lichfield since 1685
Year	1685	1781	1801	1831	1901	1911	1921	1931	1951	1961	1971	1981	1991	2001	2011	2021
Population	3,040	3,555	4,840	6,252	7,900	8,616	8,393	8,507	10,260	14,090	22,660	25,400	28,666	27,900	32,219	34,738
%±	-	16.9%	36.1%	29.2%	26.4%	9.1%	-2.6%	1.35%	19.1%	37.3%	60.8%	12.1%	12.9%	-2.7%	15.5%	7.8%

== Economy ==
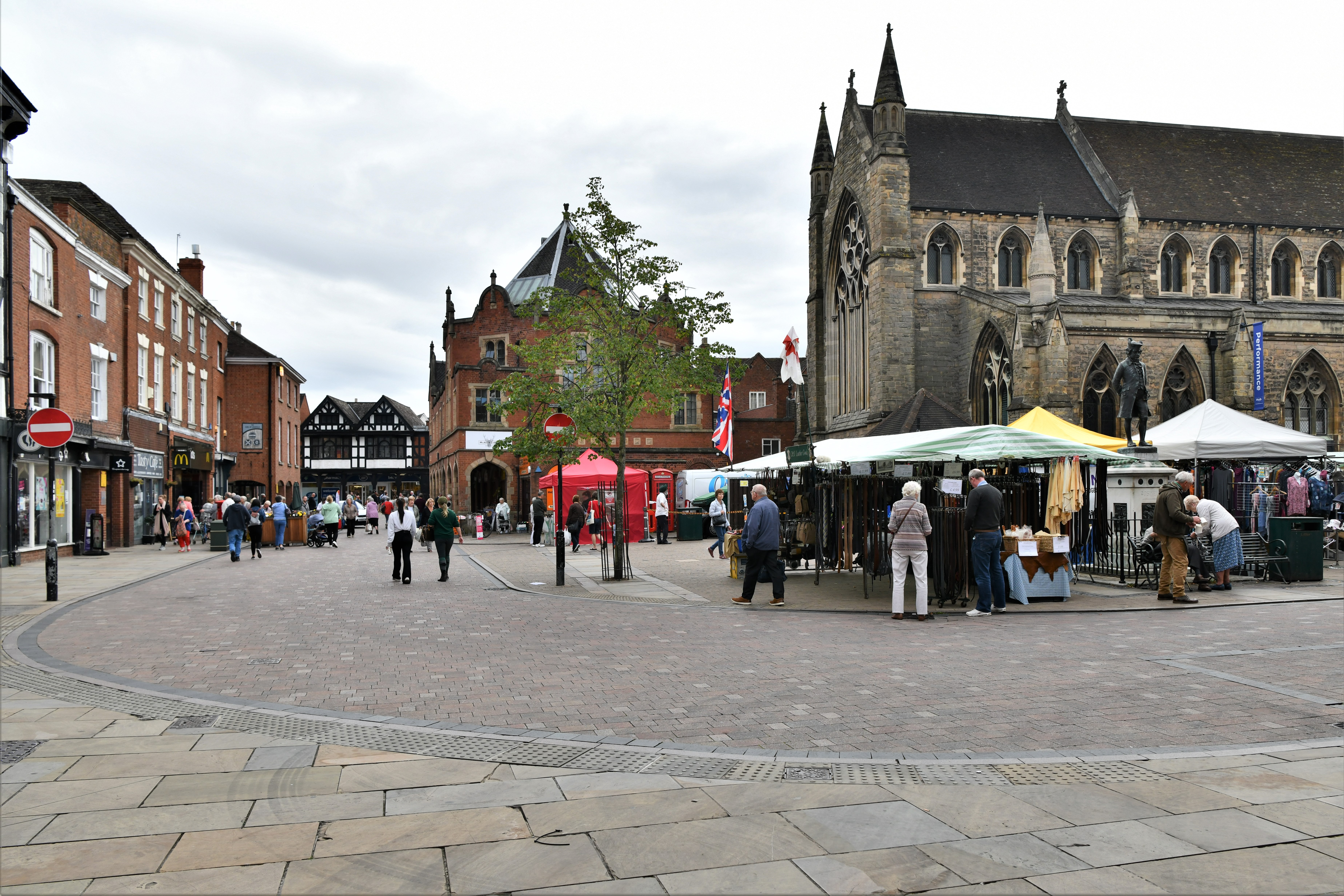
Market Square

Lichfield's wealth grew along with its importance as an ecclesiastical centre. The original settlement prospered as the place where pilgrims gathered to worship at the shrine of St Chad: this practice continued until the Reformation, when the shrine was destroyed.

In the Middle Ages, the main industry was making woollen cloth; there was also a leather industry. Much of the surrounding area was open pasture, and there were many surrounding farms.

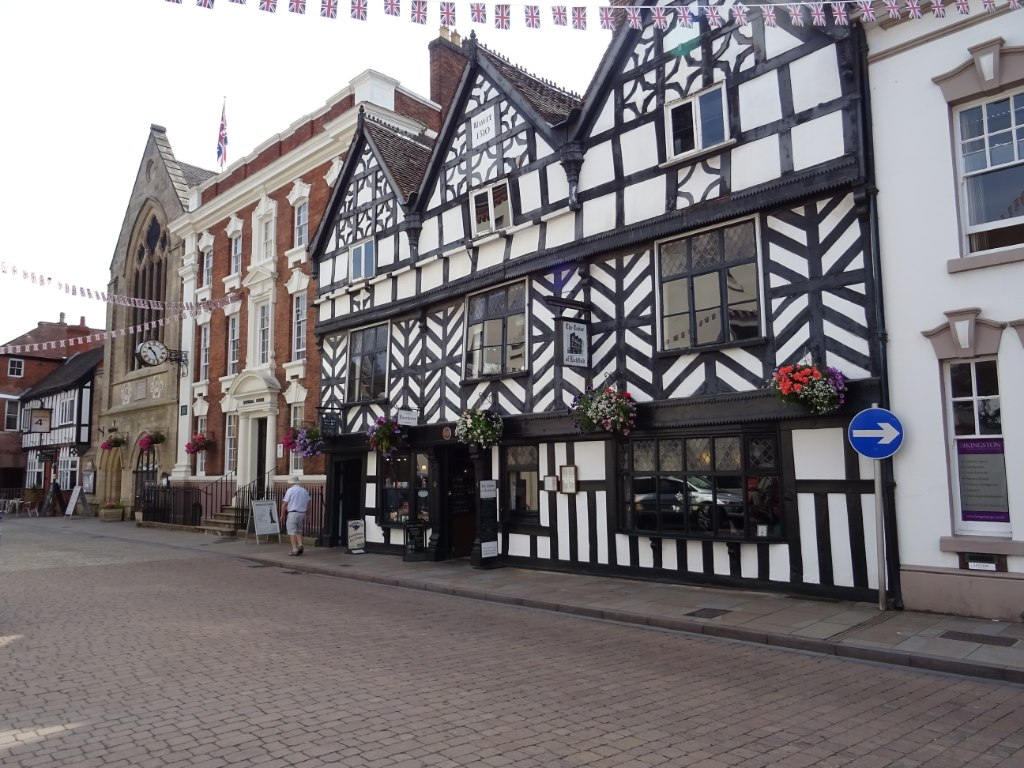
The Tudor Café in Bore Street was built in 1510.

In the 18th century, Lichfield became a busy coaching centre. Inns and hostelries grew up to provide accommodation, and industries dependent on the coaching trade such as coach builders, corn and hay merchants, saddlers, and tanneries began to thrive. The Corn Exchange was designed by T. Johnson and Son and completed in 1850.

The invention of the railways saw a decline in coach travel, and with it came the decline in Lichfield's prosperity. By the end of the 19th century, brewing was the principal industry, and in the neighbourhood were large market gardens which provided food for the growing populations of nearby Birmingham and the Black Country.

Today there are a number of light industrial areas, predominantly in the east of the city, not dominated by any one particular industry. The district is famous for two local manufacturers: Armitage Shanks, makers of baths/bidets and showers, and Arthur Price of England, master cutlers and silversmiths. Many residents commute to Birmingham.

The city is home to Central England Co-operative, and its predecessor Midlands Co-operative Society, the second largest independent consumer co-operative in the UK.

== Education ==
=== Schools ===
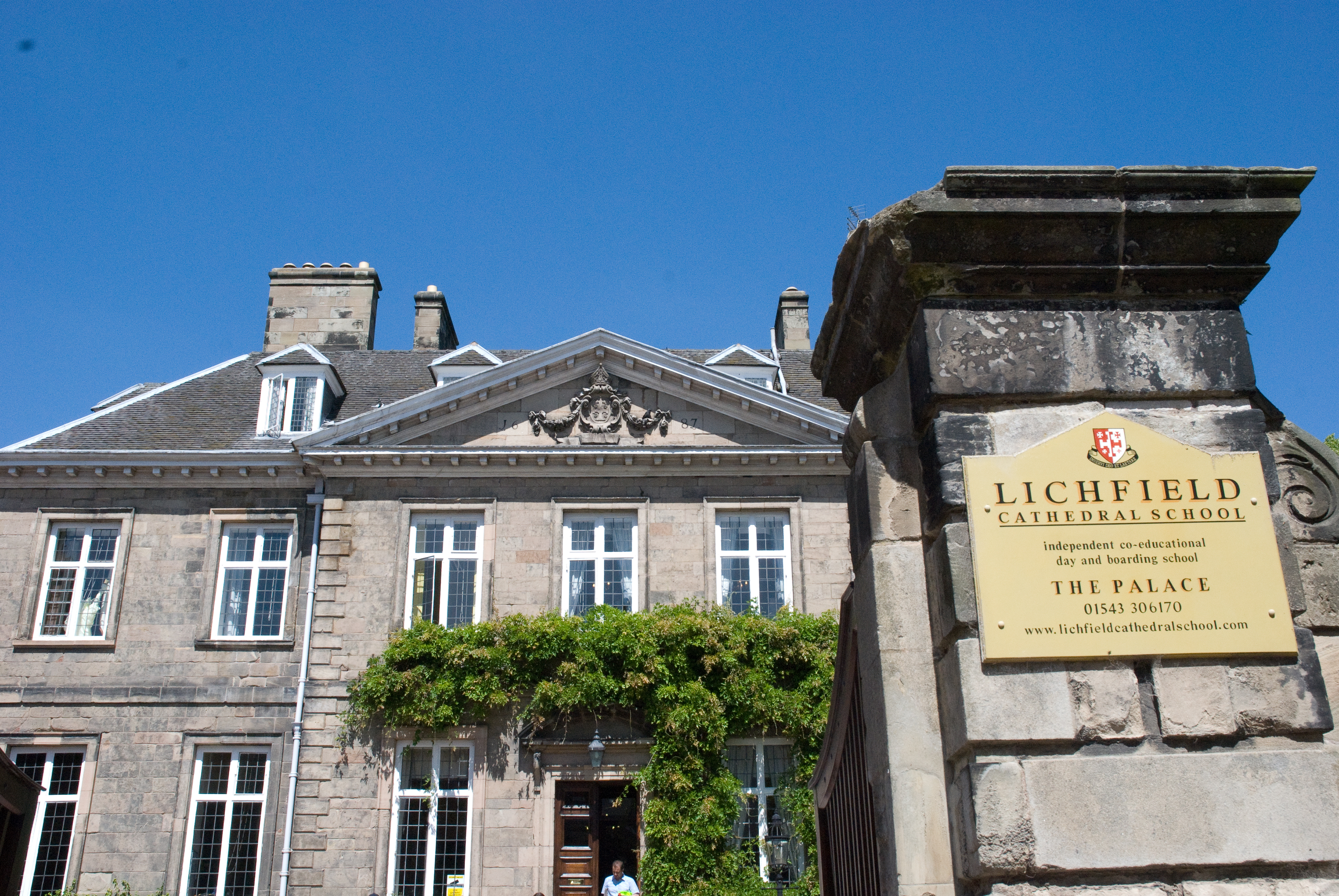
Lichfield Cathedral School

In addition to nine primary schools and one infant school, Lichfield has three secondary schools:

- The Friary School
- King Edward VI School
- Nether Stowe School, a comprehensive school with specialist Maths and Computing college status.

There are two independent schools:

- Lichfield Cathedral School: A co-educational school for ages 3 to 18, based in the Cathedral Close and Longdon
- Maple Hayes School: A DfES Approved Special School for dyslexic children.

=== Higher education ===
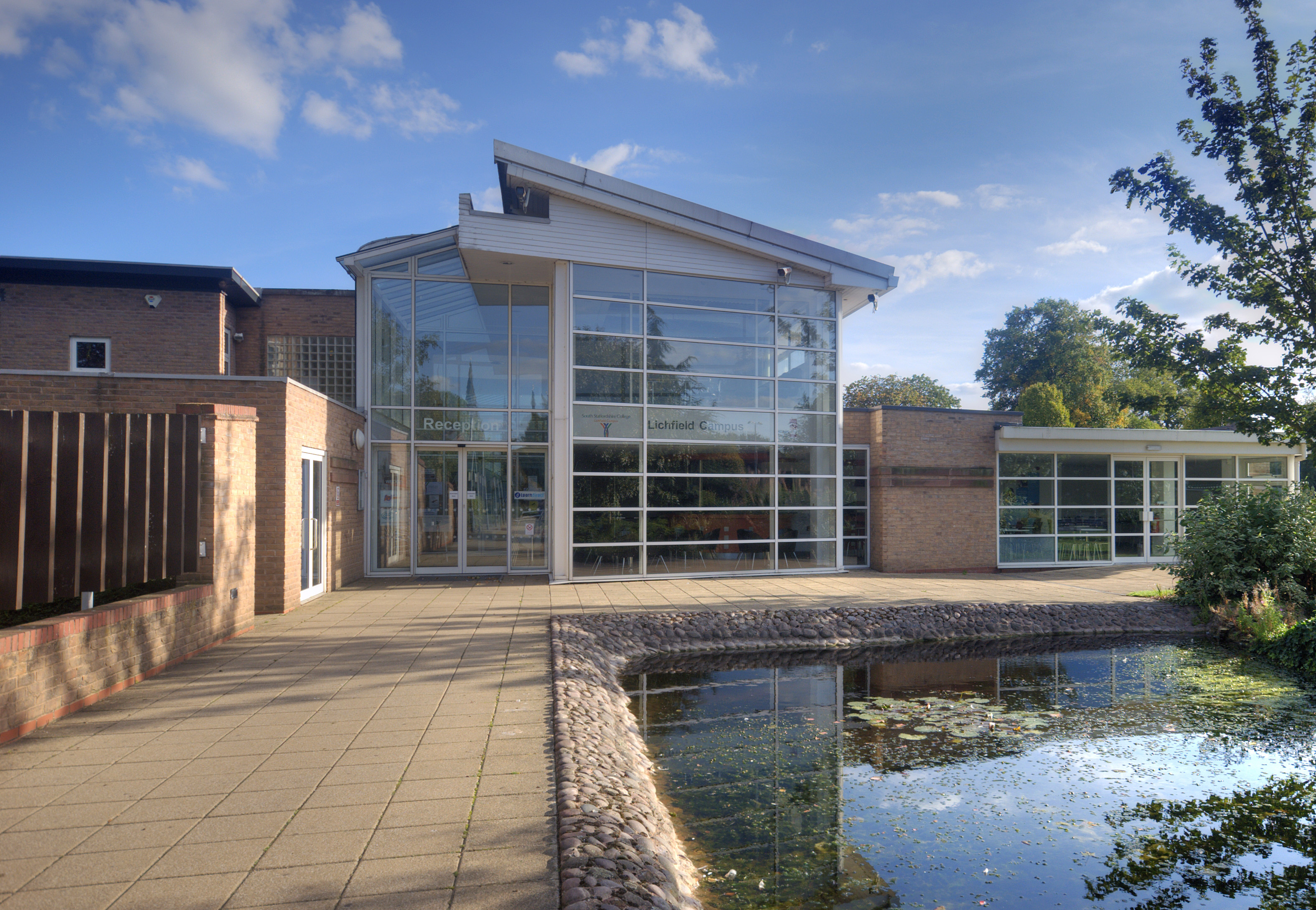
The main entrance to the Lichfield campus of the University of Staffordshire

The Lichfield campus of the University of Staffordshire and South Staffordshire College is located on the Friary. This campus facility was opened in 1998, offering further and higher education courses up to and including master's degrees. A £3 million school of art, design and media, housed in purpose-built accommodation, opened in 2006. This facility received the highest possible grade of 'outstanding provision' in the latest Ofsted inspection report.

=== Library ===
Lichfield Library and Record Office was located on the corner of St John Street and The Friary. The building also included an adult education centre and a small art gallery. The library occupied this building in 1989, when it moved from the Lichfield Free Library and Museum on Bird Street. The library moved into the newly renovated St Mary's Church on Market Square in 2018.

== Places of interest ==
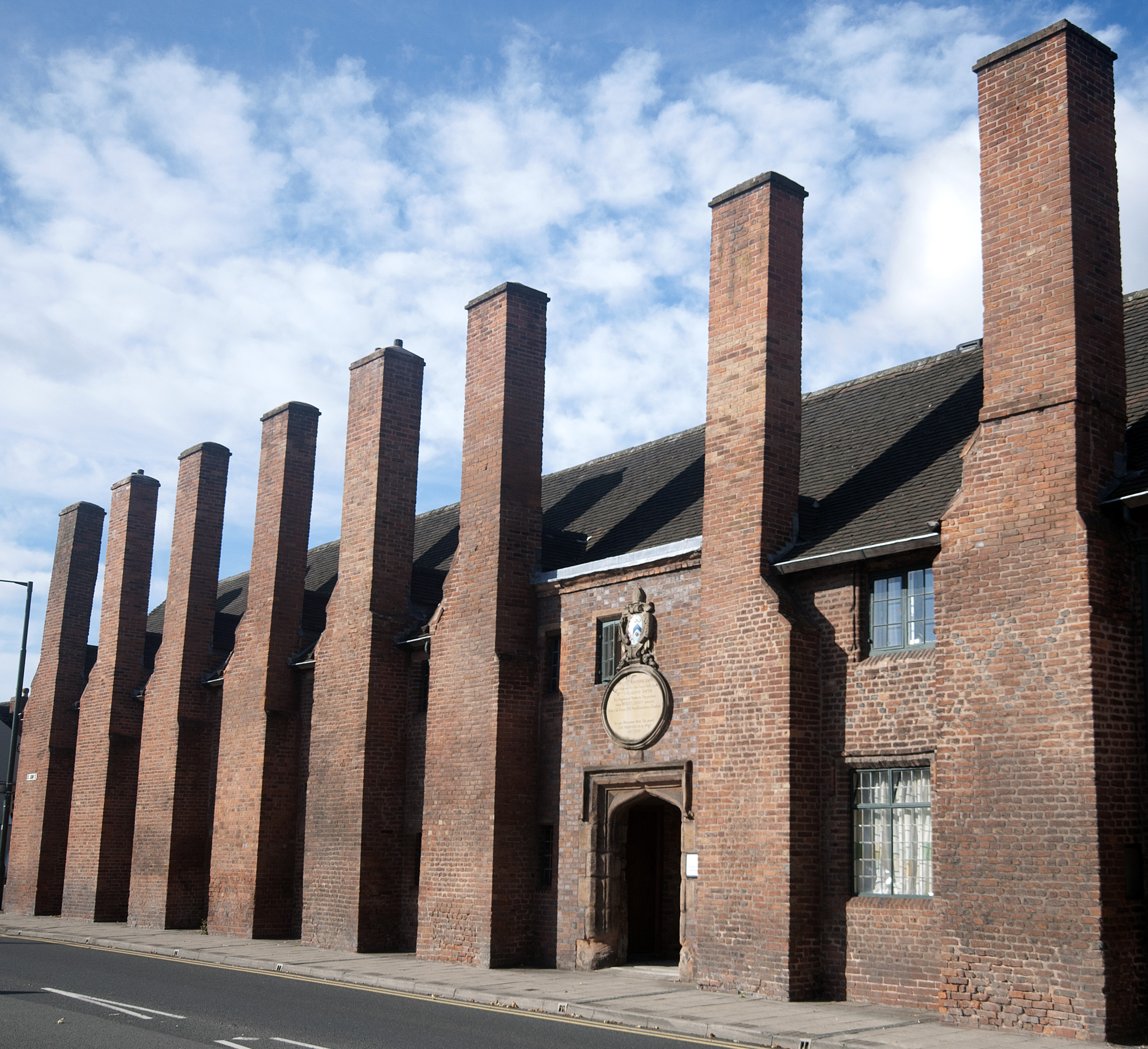
The Hospital of St John Baptist without the Barrs built in 1495 as an almshouse

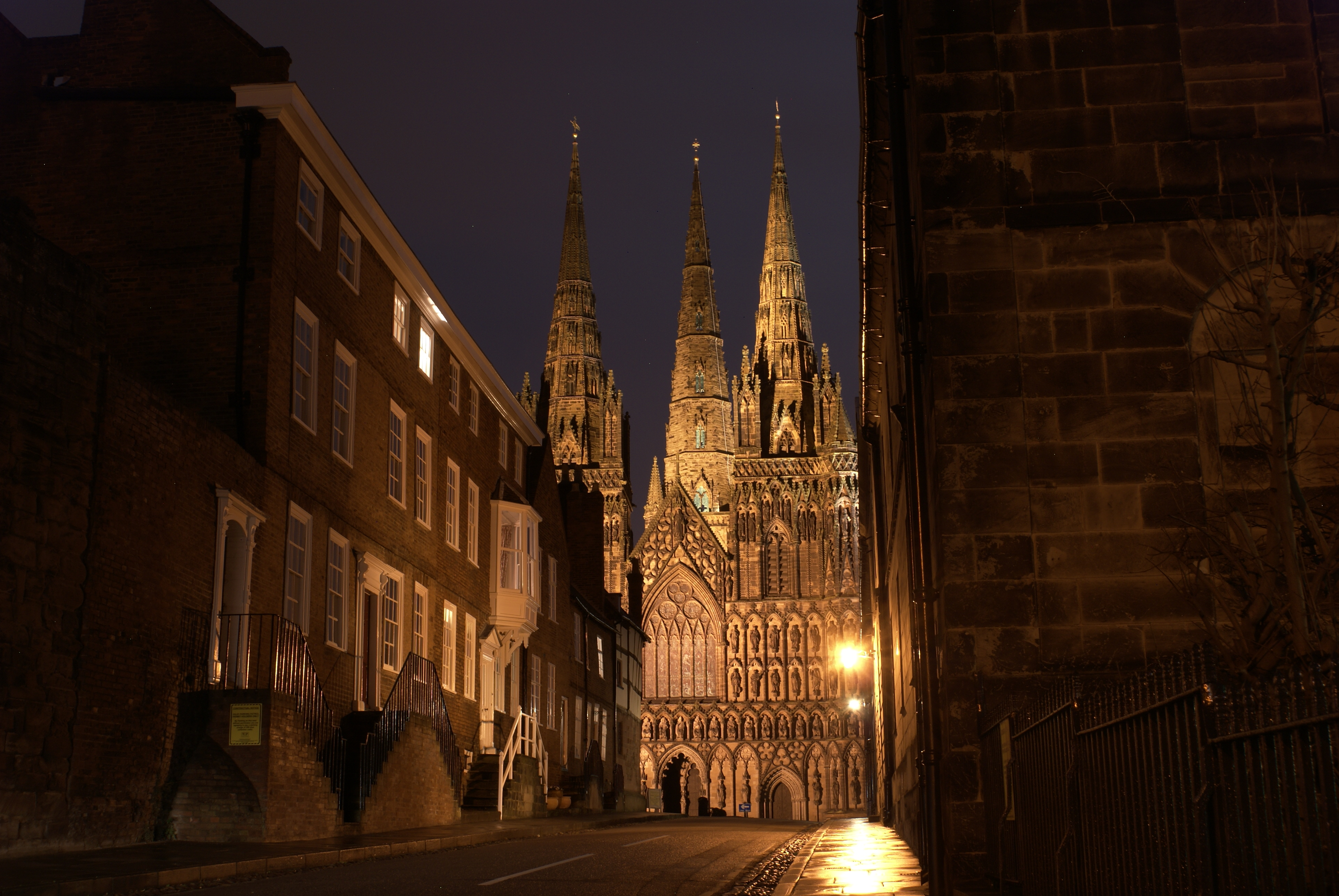
The entrance to Cathedral Close at night, with Lichfield Cathedral in the background

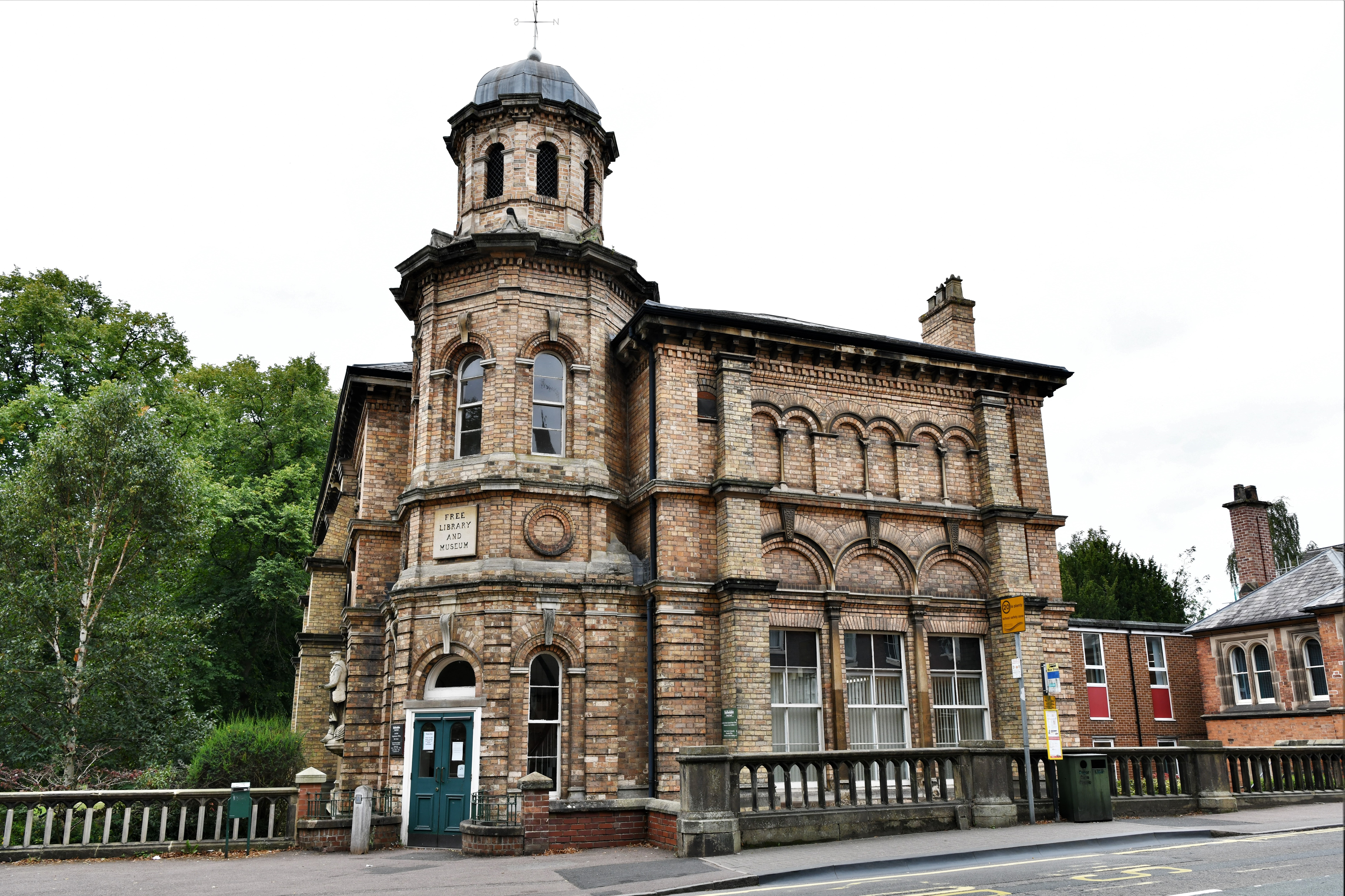
The Free Library and Museum

- Lichfield Cathedral - The only medieval cathedral in Europe with three spires. The present building was started in 1195, and completed by the building of the Lady Chapel in the 1330s. It replaced a Norman building begun in 1085 which had replaced one, or possibly two, Anglo-Saxon buildings from the seventh century.
- Cathedral Close - Surrounding the cathedral, the close contains many buildings of architectural interest.
- Samuel Johnson Birthplace Museum - A museum to Samuel Johnson's life, work and personality.
- Erasmus Darwin House - Home to Erasmus Darwin, the house was restored to create a museum which opened to the public in 1999.
- The Hub at St Mary's - located in St Mary's Church in the market square, it is a community hub and event venue which also houses the local library.
- Lichfield Guildhall - a historic building in the centre of Lichfield, located in Bore Street, it has been central to the government of the city for over 600 years.
- Bishop's Palace - Built in 1687, the palace was the residence of the Bishop of Lichfield until 1954; it is now used by the Cathedral School.
- Dr Milley's Hospital - Located on Beacon Street, it dates back to 1504 and is a women's almshouse.
- Hospital of St John Baptist without the Barrs - A distinctive Tudor building with a row of eight brick chimneys. This was built outside the city walls (barrs) to provide accommodation for travellers arriving after the city gates were closed. It now provides homes for elderly people and has an adjacent Chapel.
- Church of St Chad - A 12th-century church, though extensively restored; near the church is a reconstruction of 'St Chad's Well', where St Chad is said to have prayed and baptised people.
- St Michael on Greenhill - Overlooking the city, the ancient churchyard is one of the largest in the country at 9 acres (4 ha).
- Christ Church - An example of Victorian ecclesiastical architecture and a grade II* listed building.
- The Market Square - In the centre of the city, the square contains two statues, one of Samuel Johnson overlooking the house in which he was born, and one of his great friend and biographer, James Boswell.
- Beacon Park - An 81-acre (33 ha) public park in the centre of the city, used for sporting and recreational activities.
- Minster Pool and Stowe Pool - The two lakes occupying 16 acres in the heart of Lichfield: Stowe Pool is designated a SSSI site as it is home to native White-Clawed Crayfish. By Stowe Pool stands Johnson's Willow, a descendant of the original enormous tree which was much admired and visited by Samuel Johnson. In 2021 the fifth incarnation of the tree was installed.
- The Franciscan Friary - The ruins of the former Friary in Lichfield, now classed as a Scheduled Ancient Monument.
- Lichfield Clock Tower - A Grade II listed, 19th-century clock tower, located south of Festival Gardens.
- Letocetum - The remains of a Roman staging post and bath house, in the village of Wall, 3.5 km (2.2 mi) south of the city.
- Staffordshire Regiment Museum - 2.5 miles (4 km) east of the city in Whittington, the museum covers the regiment's history, activities and members, and includes photographs, uniforms, weapons, medals, artefacts, memorabilia and regimental regalia. Outdoors is a replica trench from World War I, and several armoured fighting vehicles.
- National Memorial Arboretum - 4 miles (6 km) north east of the city in Alrewas, the Arboretum is a national site of remembrance and contains many memorials to the armed services.
- Sandfields Pumping Station - On Chesterfield Road, this is a 19th-century Grade II* listed pumping station.

== Transport ==
=== Railway ===
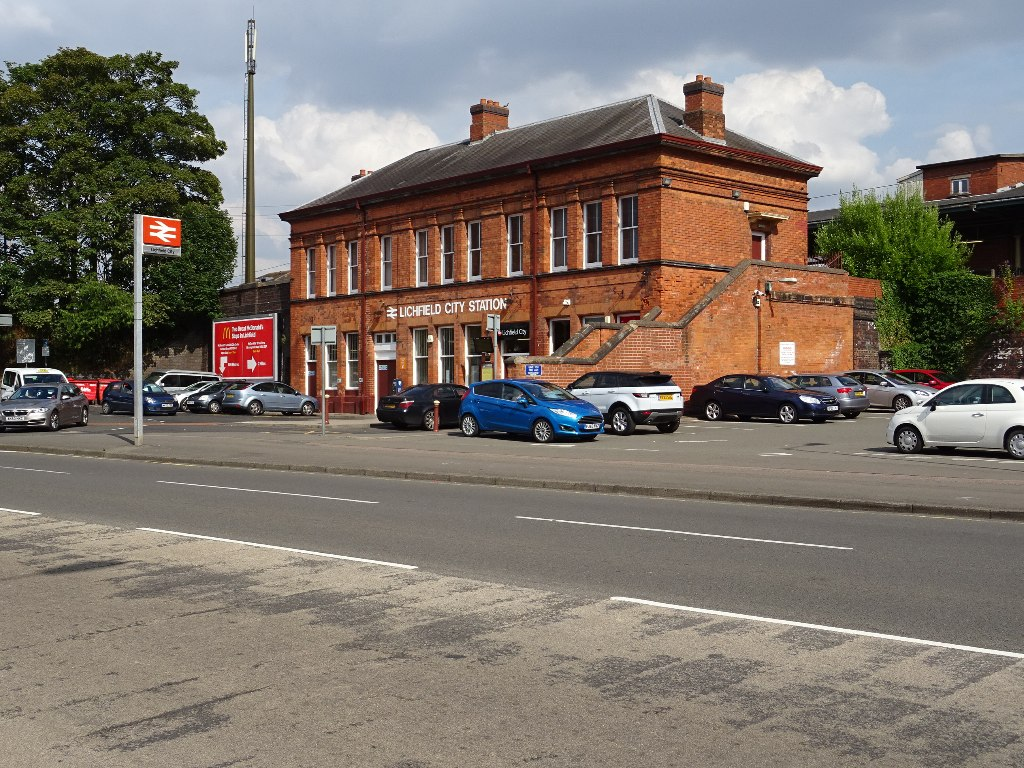
Lichfield City station is sited in the city centre.

Lichfield is served by two railway stations: Lichfield City and Lichfield Trent Valley; both were built by the London and North Western Railway. These stations are now on the Cross-City Line, with regular services to Bromsgrove and Redditch, via Birmingham New Street, operated by West Midlands Trains.

Trent Valley station is also a stop on the West Coast Main Line, located 0.9 mi (1.4 km) to the north-east of the city centre. London Northwestern Railway provides semi-fast services between London Euston, Milton Keynes Central, Rugby, Stafford and Crewe. Despite being north of Birmingham, trains to London Euston can take as little as 1 hour 9 minutes.

=== Buses ===
Arriva Midlands, Diamond East Midlands Chaserider and West Midlands Bus are the main bus operators in Lichfield; they run regular services to Birmingham, Aldridge, Brownhills, Burntwood, Rugeley, Burton upon Trent, Stafford, Sutton Coldfield, Tamworth and Walsall.

The bus station is located currently on Birmingham Road; as part of the Friarsgate development, plans have been approved for it to be moved next to City station.

=== Roads ===
Lichfield is centrally located on the UK road network. Historically, the Roman roads of Watling Street and Ryknild Street crossed 2 mi (3.2 km) south of the city at Letocetum; today, they follow much of the same routes as the A5 and A38. The A5 runs west towards Wales and south-east towards Tamworth. The A38 runs south to Birmingham and north-east to Derby. Running along the western perimeter of the city is the A51 road, which runs north to Chester and south-east to Tamworth.

The nearest motorway junction is T5 of the M6 Toll, located 2 mi (3.2 km) south of the city. Junction 9 of the M42 and junction 4A of the M6 are 12 mi (19 km) and 15 mi (24 km) to the south respectively.

=== Canals ===
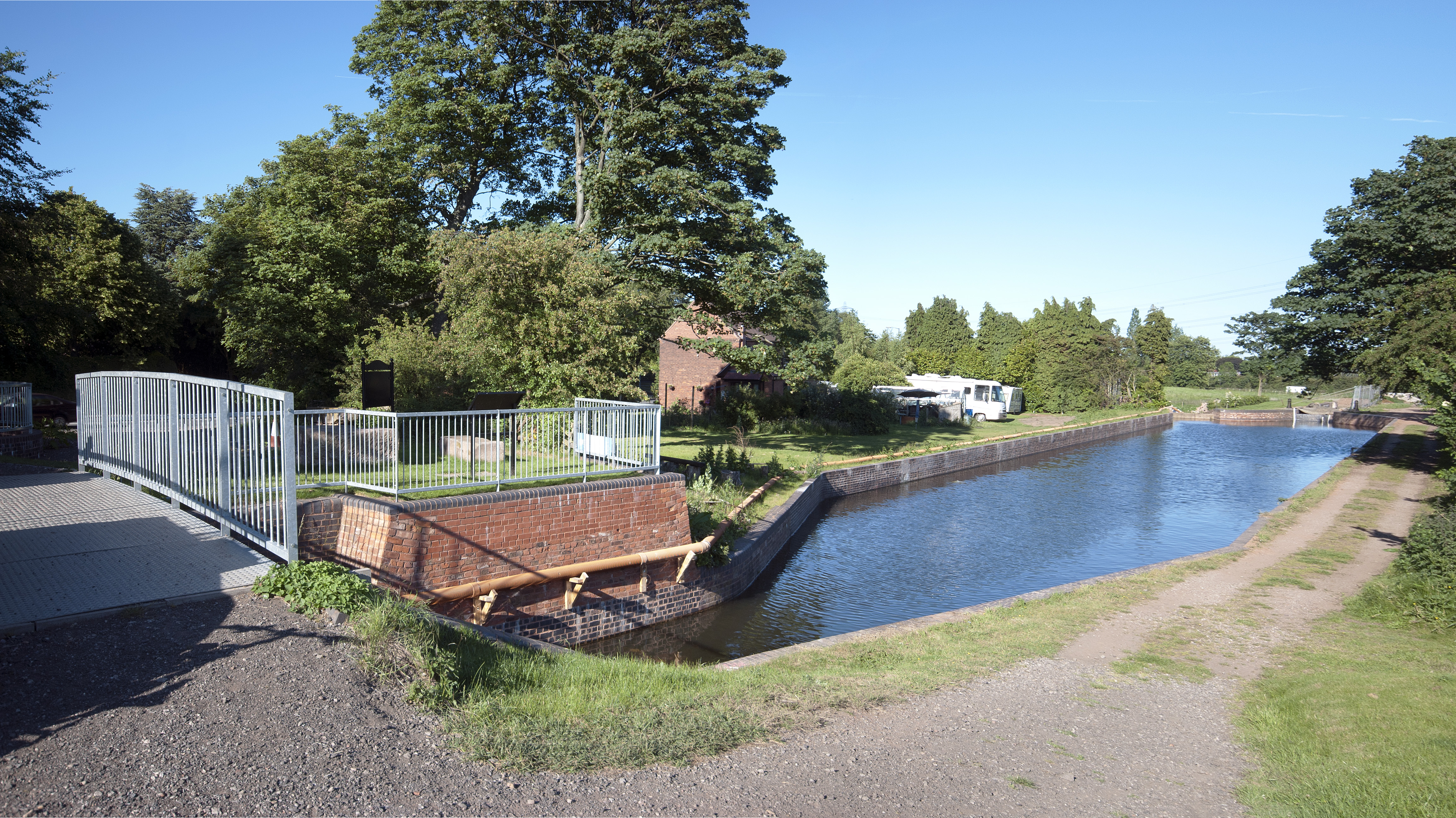
The first section of Lichfield Canal to be rewatered on Tamworth Road

Lichfield Canal was historically part of the Wyrley and Essington Canal and ran south of the city from 1797, until it was abandoned in 1955. It covers a distance of 7 mi (11 km) through 30 locks from Ogley Junction on the Birmingham Canal Navigations (BCN) to Huddlesford Junction on the Coventry Canal.

In 2009, a detailed feasibility report was produced by consultants WS Atkins to restore the canal along much of its original route and make it navigable. The nearest navigable canal to Lichfield is the Coventry Canal, which runs through Streethay.

=== Airports ===
Two nearby airports serve Lichfield: Birmingham Airport is 20 mi (32 km) to the south and East Midlands Airport is 34 mi (55 km) to the north-east.

== Religion ==
Religion	Percentage of population
Buddhist	0.3%
Christian	66.5%
Hindu	0.3%
Jewish	0.1%
Muslim	0.6%
Sikh	0.1%
No religion	24.9%
No answer	6.8%

Some 66.5% of the people in the Lichfield parish area polled as part of the 2011 Census described themselves as Christian. Lichfield has held a religious importance since St Chad became the first Bishop of Lichfield and built a monastery in 669 AD. After Chad's death in 672 AD, he was buried in an Anglo-Saxon church which later became part of Lichfield Cathedral.

Anglicanism predominates, with three parishes as well as the cathedral. St Michael's and St Mary's serve one parish and Christ Church and St Chad's serve the other two. The city lies within the Diocese of Lichfield, represented until 2026 by Bishop Michael Ipgrave.

There are two Roman Catholic churches, Holy Cross and SS Peter & Paul, which are part of the Archdiocese of Birmingham. The Church of Jesus Christ of Latter-day Saints has a meeting house on Purcell Avenue on the north side of the city. In the city centre there is a Methodist church and Wade Street Church, which is a United Reformed and Baptist church. There is a Pentecostal Church under the name Emmanuel Christian Centre in Nether Stowe and the Christadelphian Hall on Station Road. Jehovah's Witnesses have a Kingdom Hall on Lombard Street.

There are five faith primary schools in the city:

- St Michael's C of E School, Christ Church C of E School and St Chad's C of E (VC) School (Church of England)
- St Joseph's RC School and SS Peter & Paul School (Roman Catholic).

== Culture ==
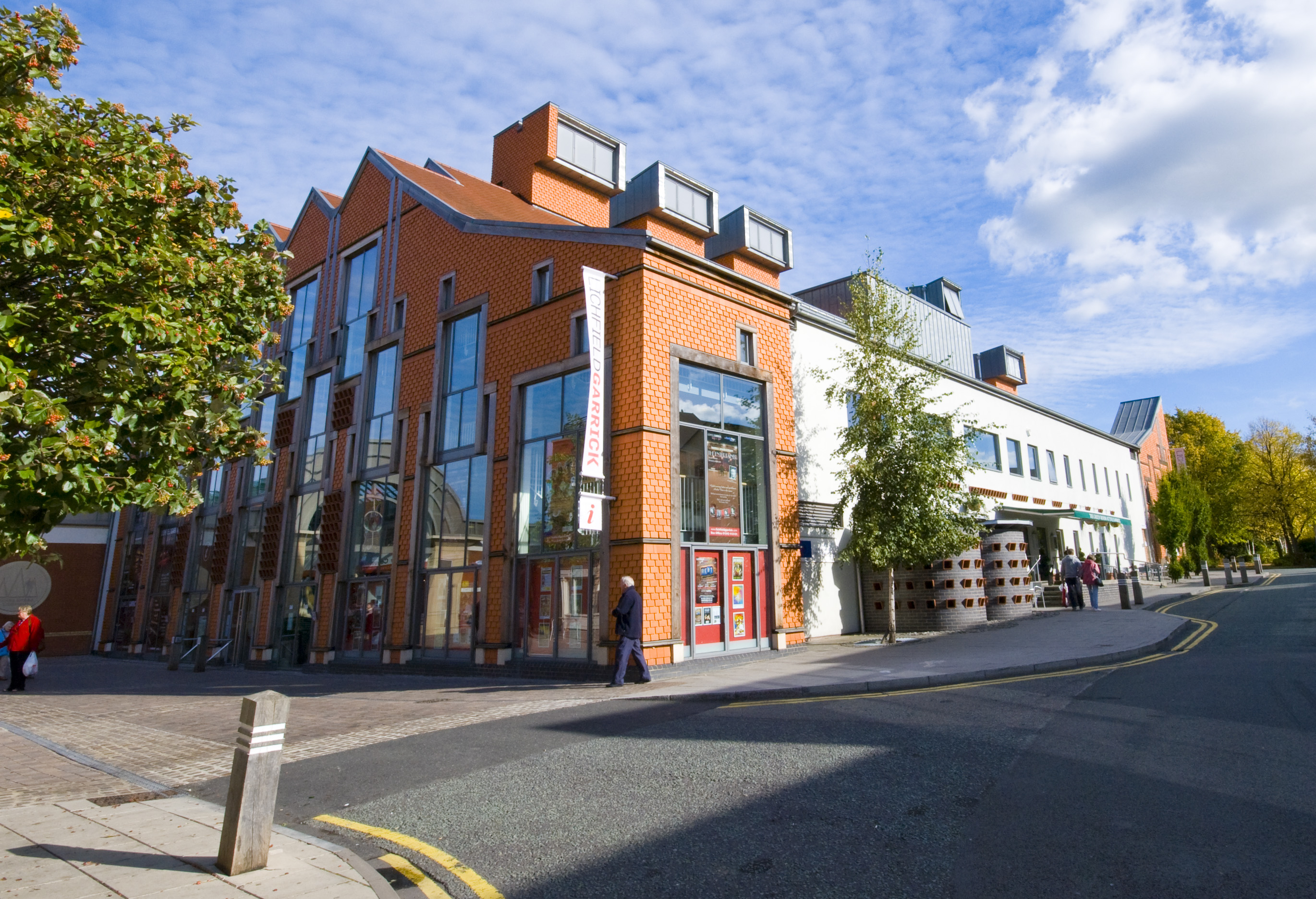
The Garrick Theatre was built in 2003

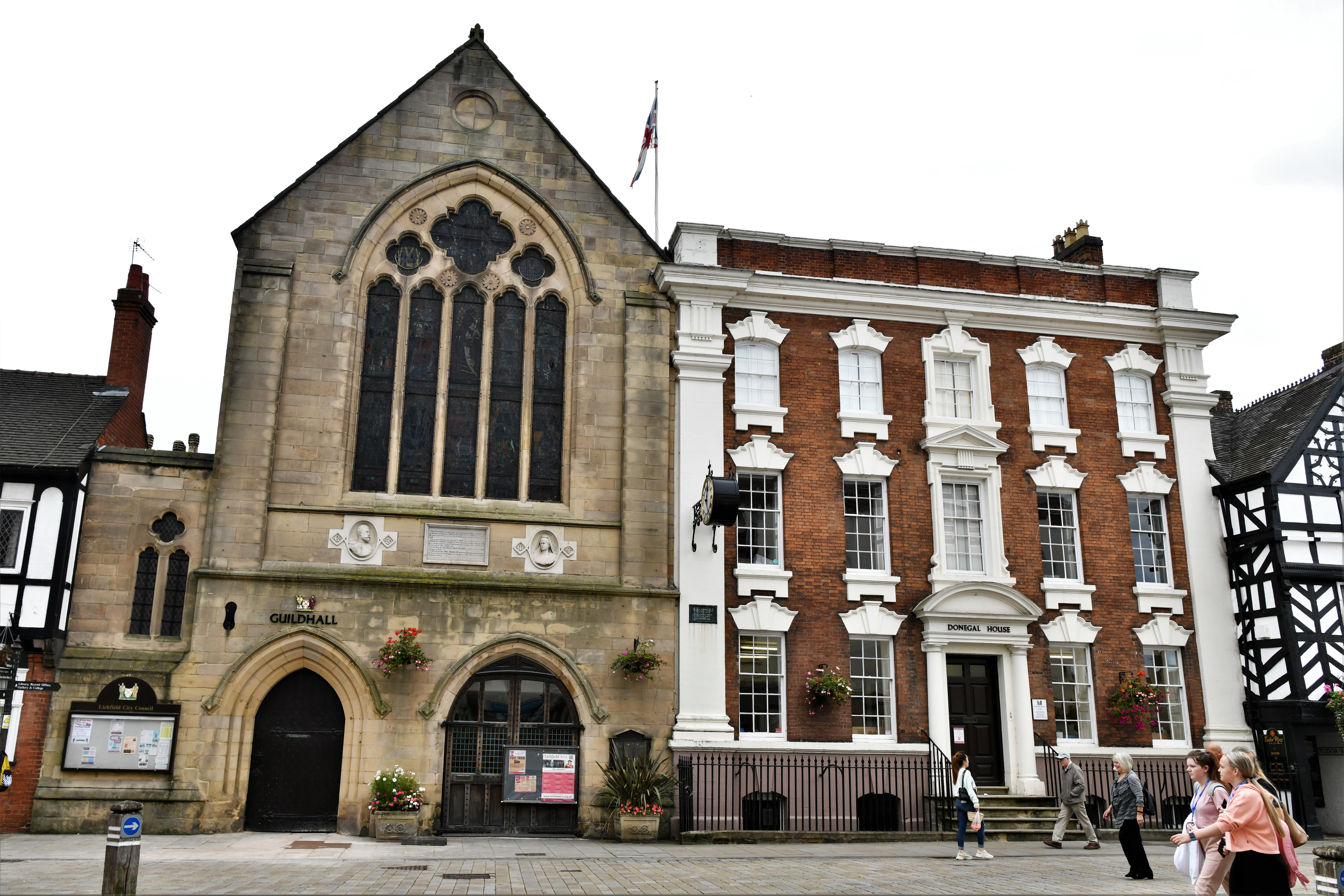
The Guildhall to the left and Donegal House to the right

The Lichfield Greenhill Bower takes place annually on Spring Bank Holiday. Originating from a celebration that was held after the Court of Arraye in the 12th century, the festival has evolved into its modern form, but has kept many of its ancient traditions. After a recreation of the Court of Arraye at the Guildhall, a procession of marching bands, morris men and carnival floats makes its way through the city and the Bower Queen is crowned outside the Guildhall. There is a funfair in the city centre, and another fair and jamboree in Beacon Park.

The Lichfield Festival, an international arts festival, has taken place every July for 30 years. The festival is a celebration of classical music, dance, drama, film, jazz, literature, poetry, visual arts and world music. Events take place at many venues around the city but centre on Lichfield Cathedral and the Garrick Theatre. Popular events include the medieval market in the Cathedral Close and the fireworks display which closes the festival.

Triennially the Lichfield Mysteries, the biggest community theatre event in the country, takes place at the cathedral and in the Market Place. It consists of a cycle of 24 medieval-style plays involving over 600 amateur actors. Other weekend summer festivals include the Lichfield Folk Festival and The Lichfield Real Ale, Jazz and Blues Festival.

Lichfield Heritage Weekend, incorporating Dr Johnson's birthday celebrations, takes place on the third weekend in September with a variety of civic events including live music and free historical tours of local landmarks.

== Media ==
Local news and television programmes are provided by BBC West Midlands and ITV Central. Television signals are received from the Sutton Coldfield transmitting station.

The city's local radio stations are BBC Radio WM, Capital Mid-Counties, Heart West Midlands, Greatest Hits Radio Birmingham & The West Midlands, Smooth West Midlands, Hits Radio Birmingham and Cannock Chase Radio FM, a community radio station that broadcasts from Cannock Chase.

Local newspapers are Lichfield Mercury and Lichfield Live.

== Sport and leisure ==
=== Sports clubs ===
Historically rugby union was more popular in the city than football largely due to the fact that it was the main sport at Lichfield Grammar School. However, both sports have remained at amateur level.

Lichfield Rugby Union Football Club was founded in 1874. As of the 2011–12 season, they play in the Midlands 1 West League, which is the 6th level of the English Rugby Union system. The team plays at Cooke Fields, located south east of the city on Tamworth Road, behind the Horse and Jockey public house.

Lichfield City plays in the Premier Division of the Midland Football League after promotion in 2012. The firs team play at Brownsfield Park. LCFC are an FA Charter Community club with teams from under sevens to adults.

AFC Lichfield are an FA Chartered Standard community youth football club and currently have teams playing in the Lichfield & District Recreational League at all levels from under 6 to under 18. AFC Lichfield also boast a football academy offering FA coaching to boys and girls aged 4–8 years.

Lichfield Diamonds LFC is at the forefront of girls' football in Staffordshire, being the first all female club to achieve Charter Standard Status. The team plays at the Collins Hill Sports Ground. The Wandering Angels took part in the first known Women's FA Cup Match on 1 November 1970 against Leicester City Supporters Ladies FC.

Lichfield Cricket Club currently play in the Third Division of the Birmingham and District Premier League. They also play at the Collins Hill Sports Ground.

Lichfield Hockey Club is a field hockey club based at Collins Hill Sports Ground on Eastern Avenue; it competes in the Midlands Hockey League. On 21 March 2015 the men's 1st team won the league with a 3–2 win over Barton, meaning they gained promotion to Men's England Hockey League for the 2015/16 season.

The city has four golf courses, including the local authority 18-hole course at Beacon Park; Darnford Moors Golf Club, a new facility in the south of the city which provides a nine-hole 'pay and play' facility; and the Robert Rock Academy, a driving range and coaching academy; Lichfield Country Club, based in Elmhurst, which boasts an 18-hole par 72 championship course and the Midlands' first American-specification nine-hole par three course; and Whittington Heath Golf Club, an 18-hole par 70 course south-east of the city, laid out on heathland and woodland.

Lichfield Archers were formed over 40 years ago and shoot at Christian Fields, where they have 20-yard indoor and 100-yard outdoor ranges. Along with club competitions, it also holds Inter-County and Inter-Club shoots and have held the Staffordshire Outdoor Championship at Christian Fields.

=== Parks ===
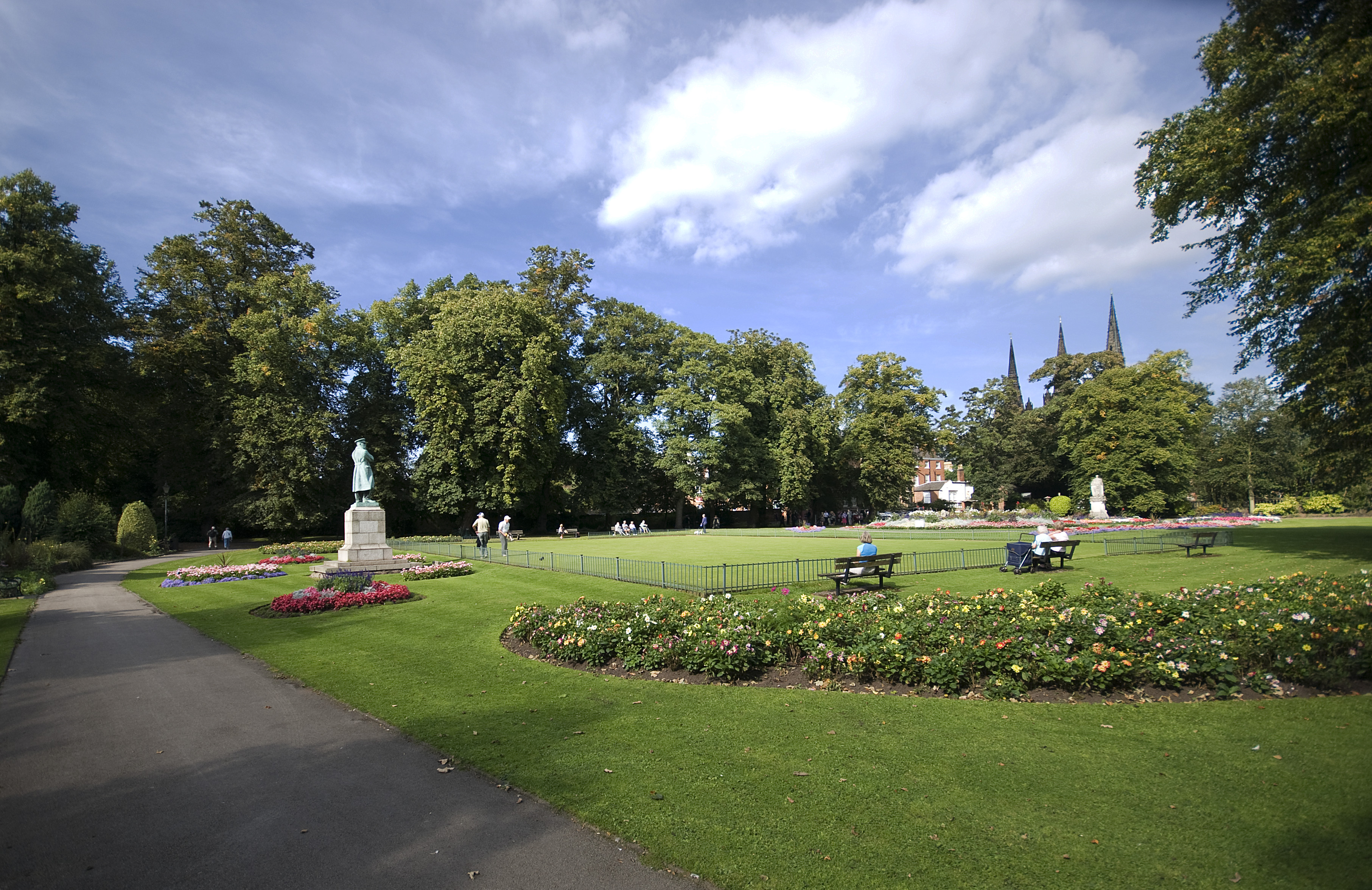
Beacon Park, in the city centre, hosts a wide range of community events

There are many parks, gardens and open spaces in the city centre:

- Beacon Park, which hosts a range of community events and activities throughout the year
- Two lakes, Minster Pool and Stowe Pool
- The Garden of Remembrance, a memorial garden laid out in 1920 after World War I, is located on Bird Street.

Other parks are located on the city's outskirts: these include Brownsfield Park, Darnford Park, Shortbutts Park, Stychbrook Park, Saddlers Wood and Christian Fields.

=== Leisure centres ===
There are two public sports and leisure facilities in the city:

- Friary Grange in the north-west of the city offers racket sports, a swimming pool, and sports hall and fitness gym
- King Edward VI in the south of the city offers racket sports, a sports hall and an artificial turf pitch.

== Notable Lichfieldians ==
=== Pre-18th century ===
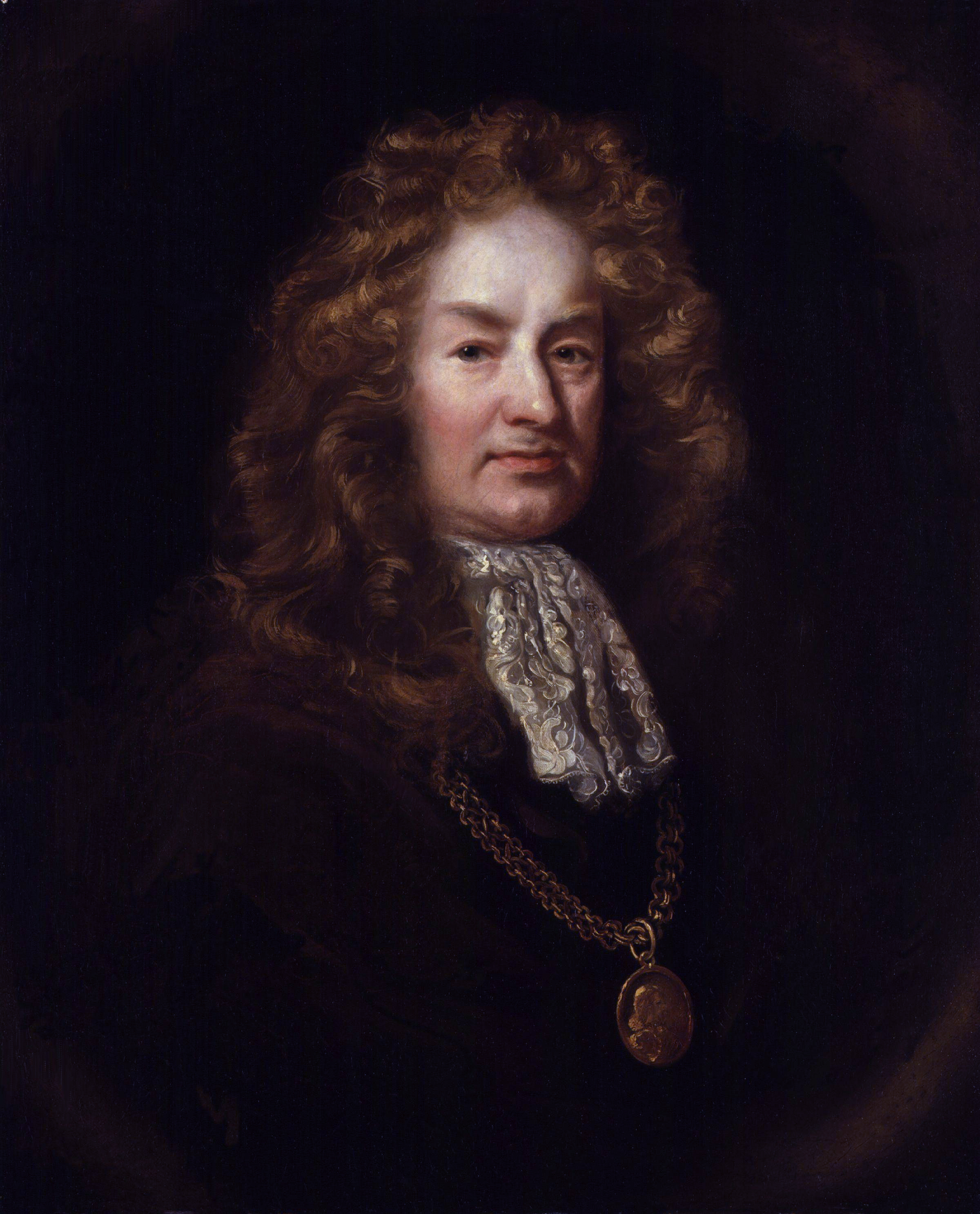
Elias Ashmole

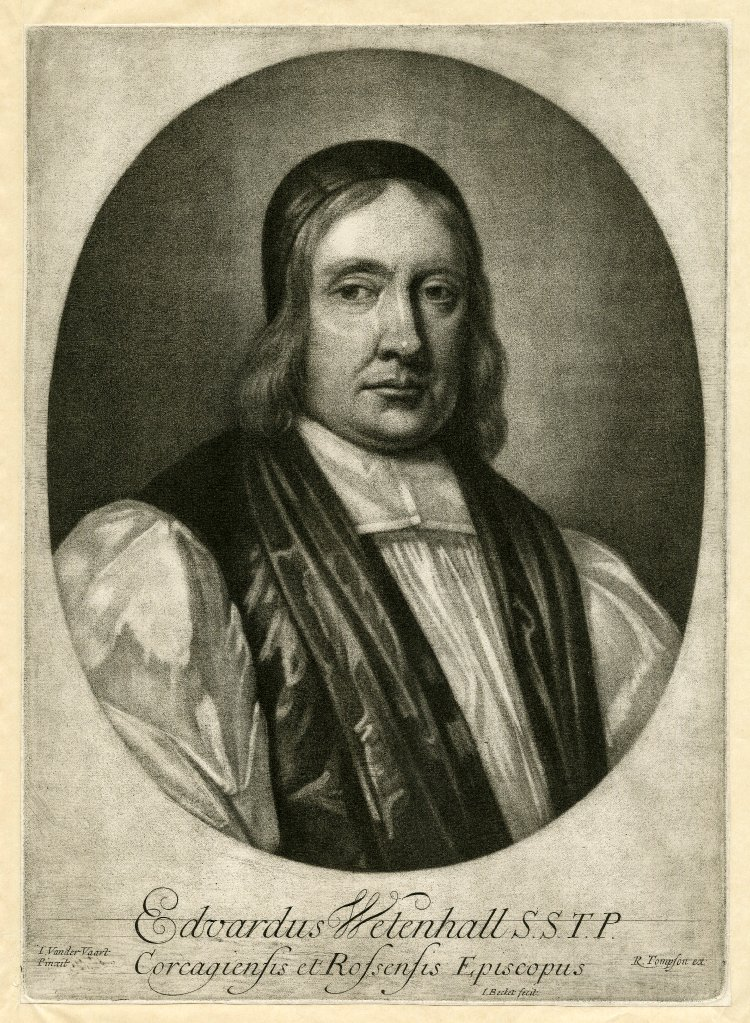
Edward Wetenhall

- Ceatta of Lichfield, an obscure 11th-century Anglo-Saxon saint.
- Edward Wightman (1566–1612), last person in England to be burnt at the stake for heresy, in the Market Place of Lichfield.
- Edmund Gennings (1567–1591), Jesuit priest and martyr
- Thomas Minors (1609–1677) merchant, MP from 1654 to 1660 and commissioner for scandalous ministers
- Michael Biddulph (1610–1666) elected MP for Lichfield in 1660 in the Convention Parliament
- Elias Ashmole (1617–1692), antiquary, politician, astrologer and alchemist. founder of Ashmolean Museum
- Edward Wetenhall (1636–1713), English bishop of the Church of Ireland
- Gregory King (1648–1712), genealogist, engraver and statistician
- John Floyer (1649 in Hints – 1734), physician and author
- Richard Dyott (1667–1719) elected MP for Lichfield in 1690-1695, re-elected 1698-1708 and elected again 1710-1715
- Joseph Addison (1672–1719), essayist, poet, playwright, and politician.
- Gilbert Walmisley (1680–1751), barrister and friend of Samuel Johnson; buried in a vault near to the south side of the cathedral
- Theophilus Levett (1693–1746), attorney, town clerk of Lichfield, politician and landowner.

=== 18th century ===
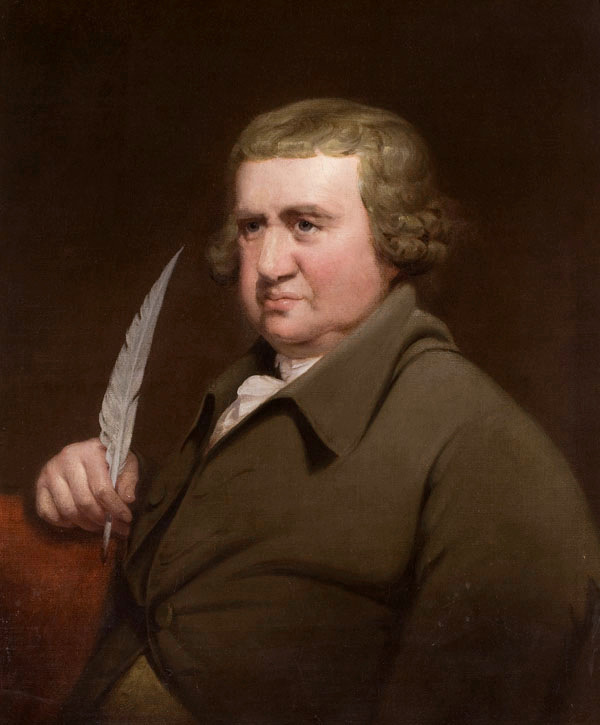
Erasmus Darwin, 1792

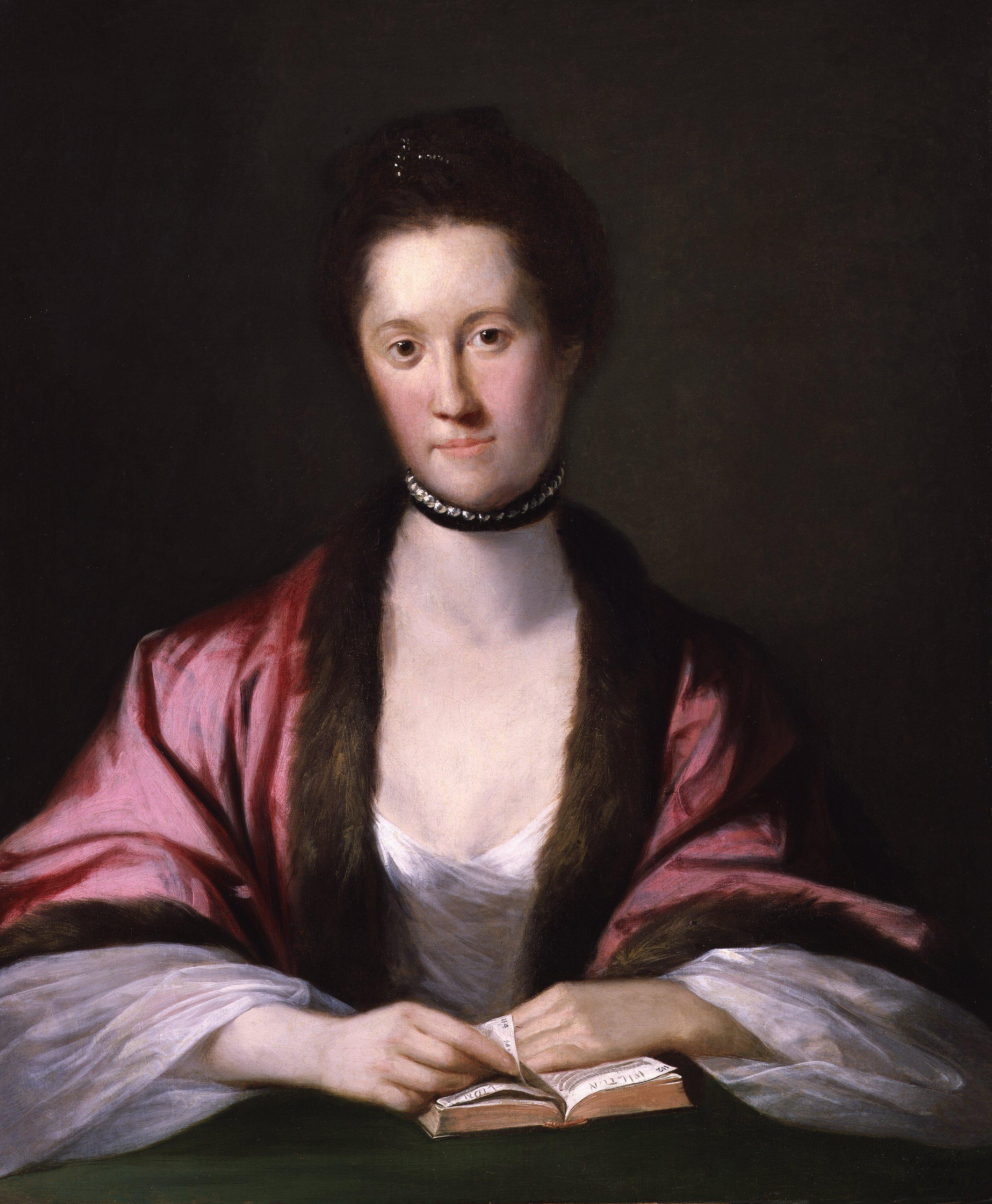
Anna Seward

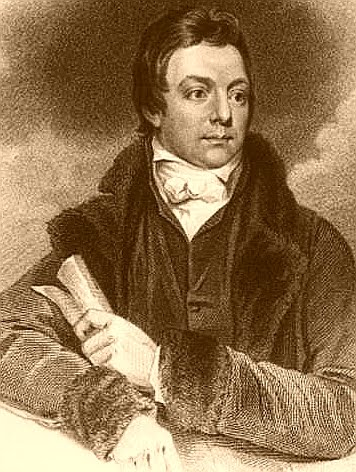
Henry Salt

- John Wyatt (1700–1766), inventor, particularly of a spinning machine
- Thomas Newton (1704–1782), cleric, biblical scholar and Bishop of Bristol, 1761 to 1782
- Samuel Johnson (1709–1784), often referred to as Dr Johnson, was an English writer, poet, playwright, essayist, moralist, literary critic, biographer, editor and lexicographer
- Richard Greene (1716–1793) antiquary and collector of curiosities
- David Garrick (1717–1779), actor, playwright, producer and theatre manager
- Erasmus Darwin (1731–1802), scientist, inventor and grandfather of Charles Darwin
- Anna Seward (1742–1809), romantic poet, memorialist and letter writer
- Richard Lovell Edgeworth (1744–1817), politician, writer, inventor, lived at Stowe House
- Theophilus Houlbrooke (1745–1824), minister and amateur botanist, President of the Liverpool Athenaeum from 1809 to 1813
- General Richard Vyse (1746–1825), general and MP for Beverley in 1806
- Joseph Potter (1756–1842) architect and builder, considerable practice in Staffordshire and neighbouring counties
- Thomas Day (1748–1789), author and abolitionist, lived for a time at Stowe House
- Henry Salt (1780–1827), antiquarian; gave Egyptian collection to the British Museum
- Admiral of the Fleet Sir William Parker, 1st Baronet, of Shenstone (1781–1866), a Royal Navy officer.

=== 19th century ===
- John Hewitt (1807–1878), antiquarian
- James Fowler (1828–1892), aka "Fowler of Louth", a Victorian ecclesiastical architect
- Richard Garnett (1835–1906), scholar, librarian, biographer and poet
- Walter Noel Hartley (1845–1913), chemist and pioneer of spectroscopy
- Frederic King (1853–1933), baritone
- Lieutenant-Colonel Michael Swinfen-Broun JP (1858–1948), soldier, magistrate, High Sheriff and Deputy Lieutenant of Staffordshire
- Mary Alice Eleanor Richards (1885–1977), British botanist and prolific collector of Zambian plants.

=== 20th century ===
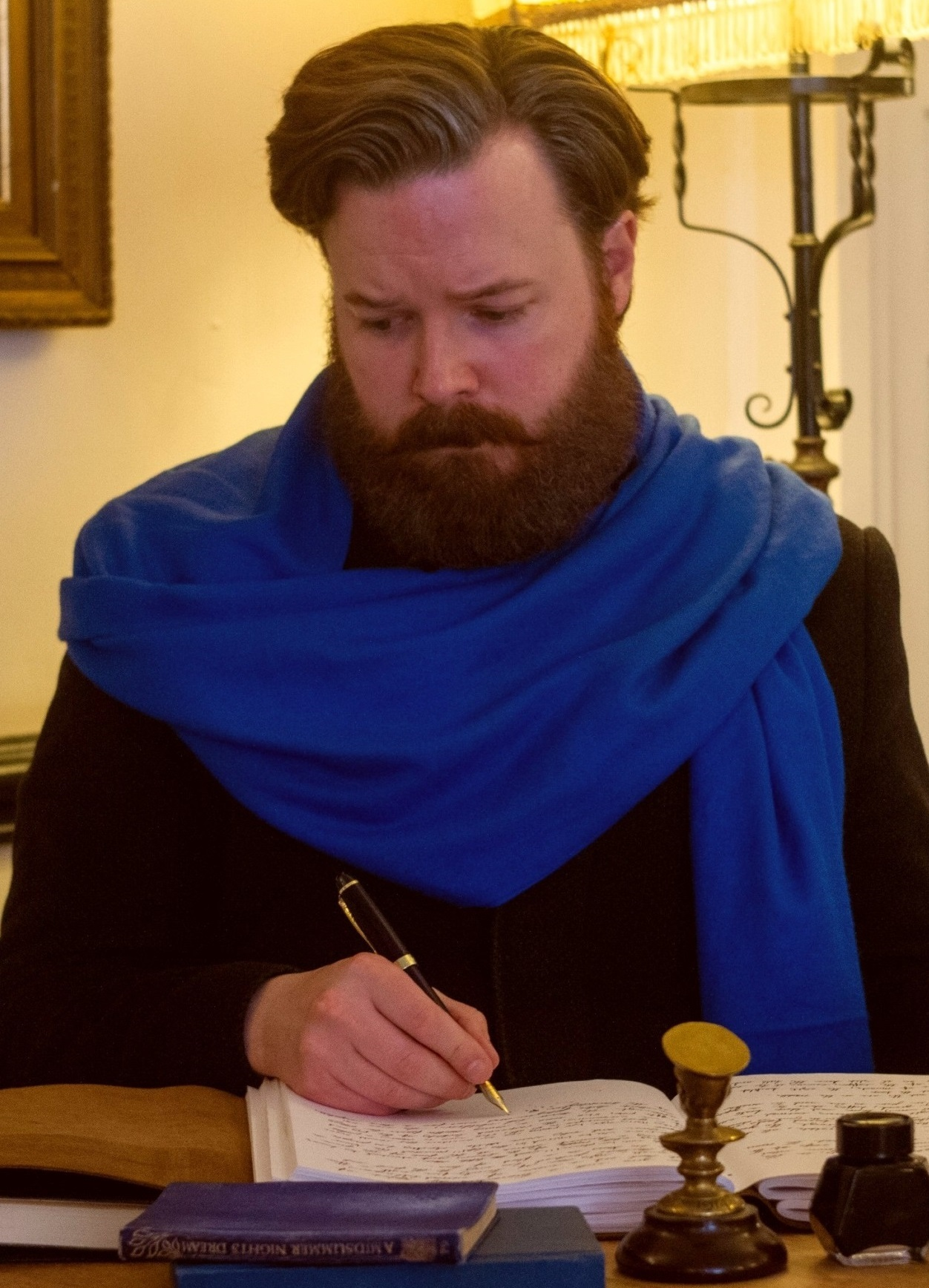
Michael Lieber

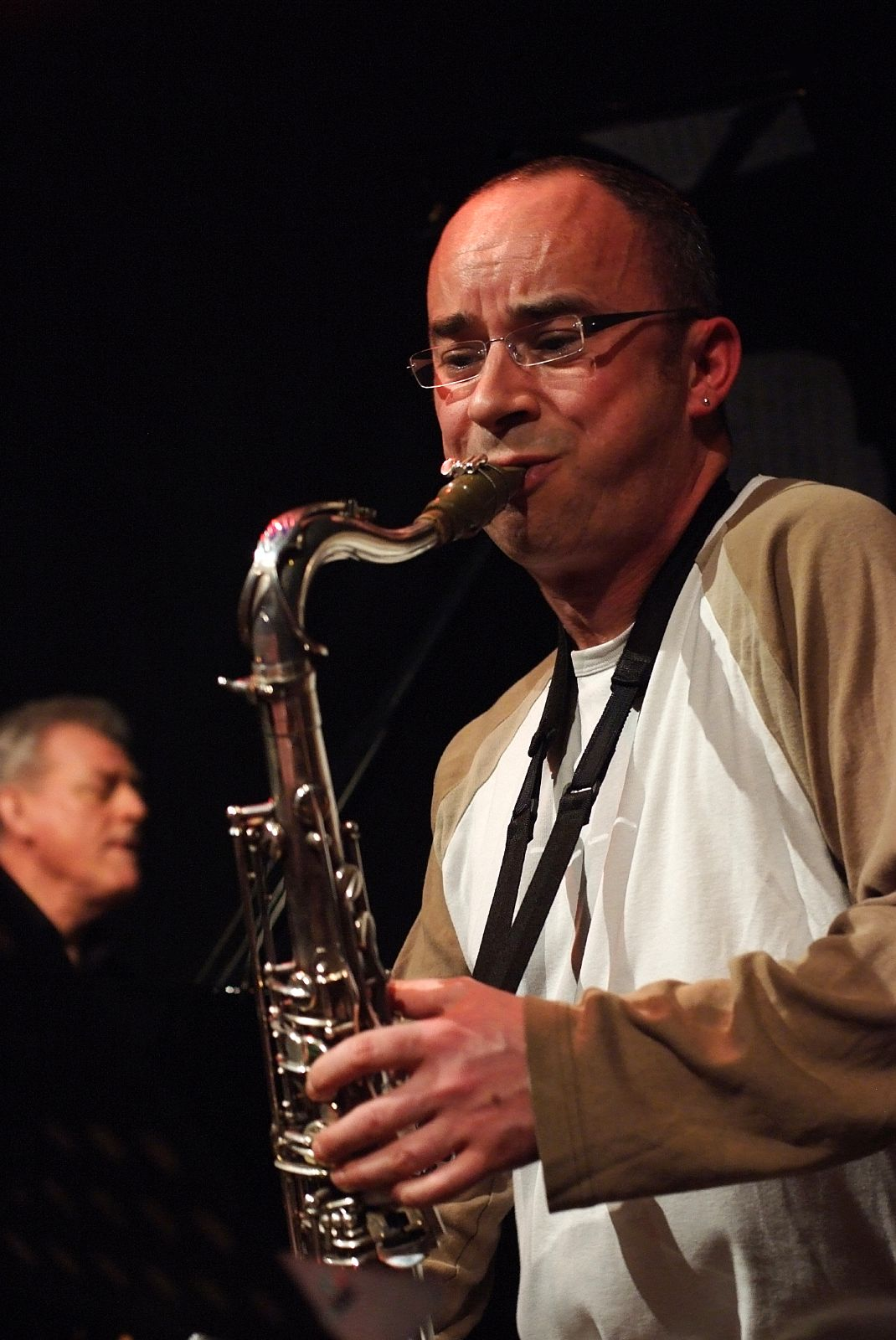
Julian Arguelles

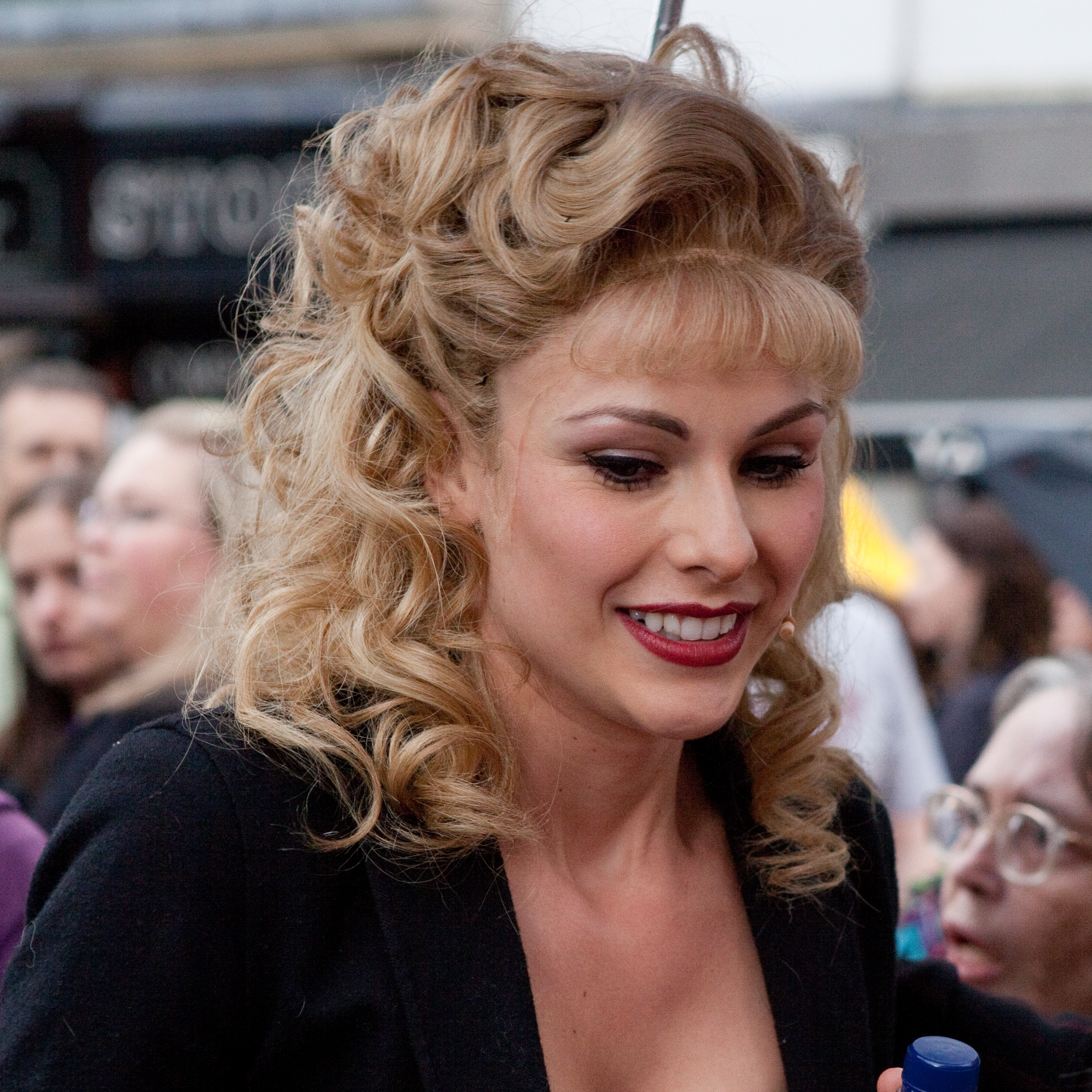
Siobhan Dillon, 2010

- Theodora Benson (1906–1968), writer
- Alasdair Steele-Bodger (1924–2008), veterinary surgeon
- Elaine Horseman (1925–1999), author
- Denis Alva Parsons (1934–2012), sculptor
- Michael Laskey (born 1944), poet and editor
- Tony Christie (born 1943), singer
- John Hinch (1947–2021) drummer, original drummer of Judas Priest
- Lieutenant General Louis Lillywhite (born 1948) retired British Army physician, Surgeon-General 2006/2009
- Phil Ford (born 1950), television writer
- Charles Lambert (born 1953) novelist and short-story writer
- Richard Allinson (born 1958), broadcaster, early morning weekend show on BBC Radio 2
- Mark Thwaite (born 1965), guitarist with rock bands The Mission, Tricky, & Peter Murphy
- Julian Argüelles (born 1966), jazz saxophonist
- Helen Baxendale (born 1970), actress
- Richie Edwards (born 1974), bassist with rock bands the Darkness and Stone Gods
- Adrian Poynton (born 1979), screenwriter, playwright and stand-up comedian
- Sian Brooke (born 1980), actress
- Bryn Fowler (born 1982), musician, bassist and backing vocalist in the band the Holloways
- Siobhan Dillon (born 1984), singer and actress
- Susan Stokes-Chapman (born 1985), novelist
- Michael Lieber (born 1988), novelist and alumnus of Lichfield's Maple Hayes Hall.

=== Sport ===
- Tommy Skelton (1856–1900), jockey, rode the winner of the Grand National 1886, Old Joe
- Roly Harper (1881–1949), professional footballer, born in Lichfield
- Noel George (1897–1929), goalkeeper for Wolves, died of a disease of the gums
- Roger Pearman (1943–2009), cricketer and cricket administrator
- Tom Leadbitter (1945–1995), scrambles, motorcycle speedway and grasstrack rider
- Jason Robinson (born 1965), cricketer
- Ian Wright (born 1972) former footballer, 347 pro appearances
- Stuart Ryder (born 1973), former Walsall F.C. and England U21 footballer
- Adam Wilcox (born 1976), racing driver
- Robert Rock (born 1977), professional golfer on the PGA European Tour, formerly a coach at Swingers Golf Centre
- Gary Mason (born 1979), motorcycle racer in the British Superbike Championship
- James Austin (born 1983) judoka, competed at the 2012 Summer Olympics
- Adam Christodoulou (born 1989), racing driver
- Sophie Capewell (born 1998), cyclist, competed at the 2024 Summer Olympics
- Owen Ward (born 1999), CS2 player
- Lewis Brunt (born 2000), footballer
- Freya Gregory (born 2003), footballer.

== International relations ==
Following the Second World War, to try and help prevent another global conflict and to ease relations between, and stop prejudices against nations, the City of Lichfield was twinned with:

- Limburg an der Lahn, Germany
- Sainte-Foy-lès-Lyon, France.

Daily newspapers from Limburg and Sainte-Foy are available at Lichfield Library.

== See also ==
- The Beaux' Stratagem by George Farquhar, play set in Lichfield in 1707
- Earl of Lichfield
- Listed buildings in Lichfield
- Heart of England Way
- Lichfield Bower
- The Lichfield Gospels
- RAF Lichfield
- Litchfield, Connecticut
