= Gilbert Walmisley =

English barrister (1680-1751)

Gilbert Walmisley or Walmesley (1680–1751) was an English barrister, known as a friend of Samuel Johnson.

== Life ==
Walmisley was descended from an ancient family in Lancashire. He was born in 1680, and was the son of William Walmisley of the city of Lichfield, chancellor of that diocese from 1698 to 1713, and M.P. for the city in 1701, who married in Lichfield Cathedral on 22 April 1675 Dorothy Gilbert, and was buried in the cathedral on 18 July 1713. He matriculated as commoner from Trinity College, Oxford, on 14 April 1698, but did not take a degree. In 1707 he was called to the bar at the Inner Temple, and became registrar of the ecclesiastical court of Lichfield. He was probably a near relative of William Walmisley, prebendary of Lichfield from 1718 to 1720, and dean from 1720 to 1730.

Walmisley, ″the most able scholar and the finest gentleman″ in the city according to Miss Seward, lived in the bishop's palace at Lichfield for thirty years; and Johnson, then a stripling at school, spent there, with David Garrick, ″many cheerful and instructive hours, with companions such as are not often found.″ He was ″a whig with all the virulence and malevolence of his party,″ but polite and learned, so that Johnson could not name ″a man of equal knowledge,″ and the benefit of this intercourse remained to him throughout life. He endeavoured in 1735 to procure for Johnson the mastership of a school at Solihull, near Warwick, but without success. A tribute to his memory was paid by Johnson in his ″Life″ of Edmund Smith.

Walmisley died at Lichfield on 3 August 1751, and his widow died on 11 November 1786, aged 77. Both are buried in a vault near the south side of the west door in Lichfield Cathedral.

== Legacy ==
A poetical epitaph by Thomas Seward was inscribed on a temporary monument; it was printed in the Gentleman's Magazine. It is said that Johnson promised to write an epitaph for him, but procrastinated until it was too late. A prose inscription to Walmisley's memory is on the south side of the west door of Lichfield Cathedral. Johnson's eulogy from his Life of Smith was also inscribed on an adjoining monument.

Walmisley's library was sold by Thomas Osborne of Gray's Inn in 1756. The Latin translation of John Byrom's verses, beginning "My time, O ye muses", printed in the Gentleman's Magazine (1745, pp. 102–3) as by G. Walmsley of "Sid. Coll. Camb.", and sometimes attributed to Gilbert Walmisley, is now thought by Galfridus Walmsley, B.A. from that college in 1746. Some correspondence between Garrick and Johnson and Walmisley was printed in Garrick's Private Correspondence, and in Johnson's Letters, ed. Hill.
