= Court of Arraye =

A Court of Arraye (or View of Men at Arms) was a method of ascertaining numbers of men capable of fighting in towns and cities before England had a standing army.

A statute of Henry II of England (1134–1159) ordered that all men capable of bearing arms should be inspected by the magistrates of each major town and city of England. Since there was no standing army, this was a way to find out how many men could fight in a war.

The Court of Arraye was confirmed with the Statute of Winchester in 1285 which commanded that "every man between 15 years of age and 60 years shall be assessed and sworn to armour" according to their wealth and means.

The statutes of Arraye were repealed in the reign of James I (1566–1625). After the English Civil War, when England had acquired a standing army, courts of Arraye were no longer necessary, and about the year 1680 they were abolished.

The tradition of a Court of Arraye has continued in carnival form at Lichfield bower in Staffordshire, which has evolved from the procession that the men took after being inspected.
