= Tommy Skelton =

British jockey

Thomas Skelton (21 November 1856? – 27 November 1900) was a jockey who rode the winner of the 1886 Grand National aboard Old Joe. In his first four attempts to win the race, he placed third, then first, second and fourth, before being unplaced on two subsequent attempts. The silks Skelton wore to victory in 1886 are today in the possession of Aintree Racecourse and are occasionally displayed in the weighing room bar on Grand National day.

Skelton's biography is a matter of some debate. It is most commonly believed among racing historians that Skelton was born in Lichfield on 21 November 1856 and apprenticed to Tom Stevens at Chilton, Oxfordshire, then in Berkshire. Described by contemporaries as 'a good flat jockey', he also rode under National Hunt rules where he achieved his greatest success. He was very light and in the words of one authority "although always thought of as a somewhat delicate man to be engaged in the hazardous trade of jump jockey, his determination and flair had long been acknowledged". Tommy Skelton also rode winners of the Grand Sefton Steeplechase and the Lancashire Steeplechase before losing an eye in a shooting accident near Newmarket in 1890, which effectively ended his riding career.

From 1884 he also trained racehorses for over ten years, mostly near Newmarket but also at Headbourne Worthy and Hednesford. He then took an inn at Kidderminster. Skelton was arranging to return to live at Newmarket, but died while visiting friends at Kentford close to that town on 27 November 1900.
