= Lichfield Bower =

Festival in Lichfield, England

The Bower is a festival held each spring on a bank holiday in Lichfield, England. A statute of Henry II of England ordered that all men capable of bearing arms should be inspected by the magistrates. Since there was no standing army, this was a way to find out how many men could fight in a war. The men would then march through the streets and retire at a "Bower House" for roast beef and wine, ensuring a good turn-out.

Today the Bower retains the traditional procession and there is an event in Beacon Park, with arena acts, a community stage, dog show, food stalls and stalls for both community organisations and traders, together with a large funfair.

== History ==
The Origins of the Bower go back to the reign of Henry II (1154-1189). At that time England had no standing army, as such when the King needed troops to defend the realm he had to raise them by mustering all the able-bodied men between the ages of 16 and 60 throughout the kingdom. To enable him to do this, Henry set up a commission of array which had to submit to the King yearly a return of all the men-at-arms available. Every city and town mustered fighting men on one day in the year and sent the figures in to the commission of array. These musters were known as the Courts of Arraye, and in Lichfield the Court of Arraye was always held on Whit Monday.

It was held at Greenhill where a “Bower House” was erected and decorated with laurel and lilac. Here the men-at-arms mustered before the magistrates with their arms and armor and were regaled with free beef and wine. At the end of the day the magistrates sent a return of the numbers to the Commission of Arraye in London. As an example of this, in 1604 the report of the Commission contained the following:

“Leichfield Town, able men 285; armed men 150; pioneers 50; high horses 50”.

The tradition started in Lichfield in which the men-at-arms were paraded around the streets of the city. They were accompanied by the Lichfield Morris dancers with drum and tabor and by people from the churches carrying figures of saints garlanded with flowers. Whitsun being an important festival of the Church, these garlanded figures were known as “posies”. After the Reformation, the figures of saints were replaced by the tableaux representing different trades, but the term “posie” was still used to describe them.

The introduction of gunpowder led to musketeers being included in the procession. When the procession halted outside the houses of the principal citizens, the musketeers would fire a volley over the house, whereupon the principal citizen was expected to offer cakes and ale to those in the procession. This went on all day, until late in the evening the participants staggered into the Market Place to be dismissed by the Town Clerk.

By the time of James II the country had a standing army. Famous regiments such as the Coldstream and Grenadier Guards and the Royal Scots were already in existence, and it was decided that the commission of array was no longer needed. It was abolished in 1690 and Courts of Arraye ceased to exist throughout the country, except in Lichfield where the inhabitants decided that as they enjoyed Bower Day so much they would continue to observe it, a tradition that continues into modern day. Most of the ancient features of the Bower still survive – the Court of Arraye is held in the Guildhall, when the Mayor inspects the “men-at-arms” the procession through the streets includes the Morris Dancers and military bands, and the place of the posies has been taken by the tableaux mounted on lorries and trailers.
