= Christ Church, Lichfield =

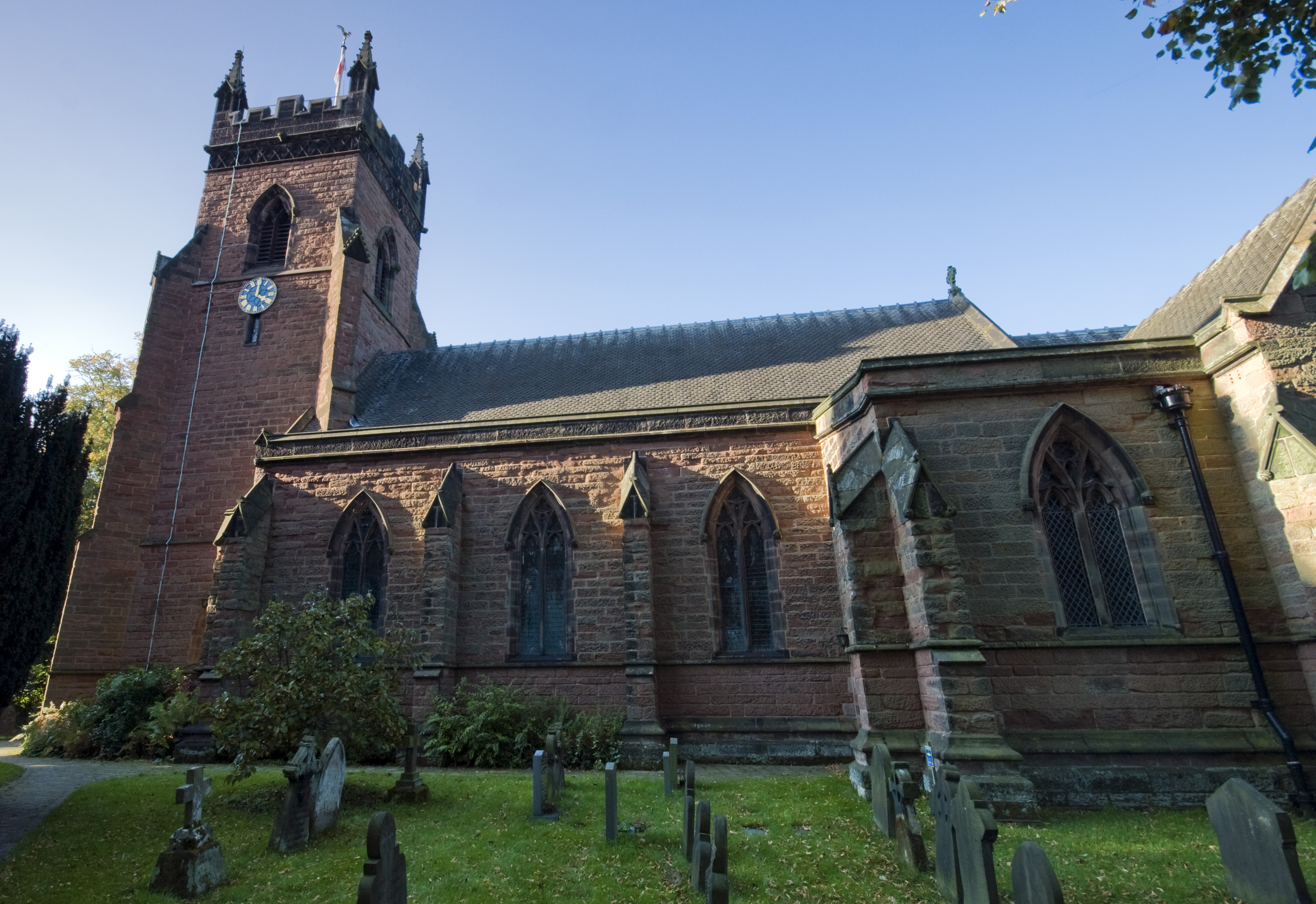
- Christ Church, Lichfield
- 52.68140°N 1.84074°W
- OS grid reference: SK 10867 09313
- Location: Lichfield, Staffordshire
- Country: England
- Denomination: Church of England
- Website: www.christchurch-lichfield.org.uk

History
- Consecrated: 26 October 1847

Architecture
- Functional status: Active
- Heritage designation: Grade II*
- Architect: Thomas Johnson
- Style: Decorated Gothic Revival
- Completed: 1847

Administration
- Province: Canterbury
- Diocese: Lichfield
- Parish: Lichfield

Christ Church is a parish church in Lichfield, Staffordshire in England. The church is situated in Leamonsley in the south west area of the city. The church is of Anglican denomination and serves a parish made up of Leamonsley, Sandfields and Lower Sandford Street areas of the city.

The church is a fine example of the Decorated Gothic Revival style seen in ecclesiastical architecture during the 19th century. The church is a Grade II* listed building and the Hinckley family tombs at the rear of the church are Grade II listed monuments. On the ceiling of the chancel are some unique Pre-Raphaelite canvas panels painted by John D. Batten.

== History ==
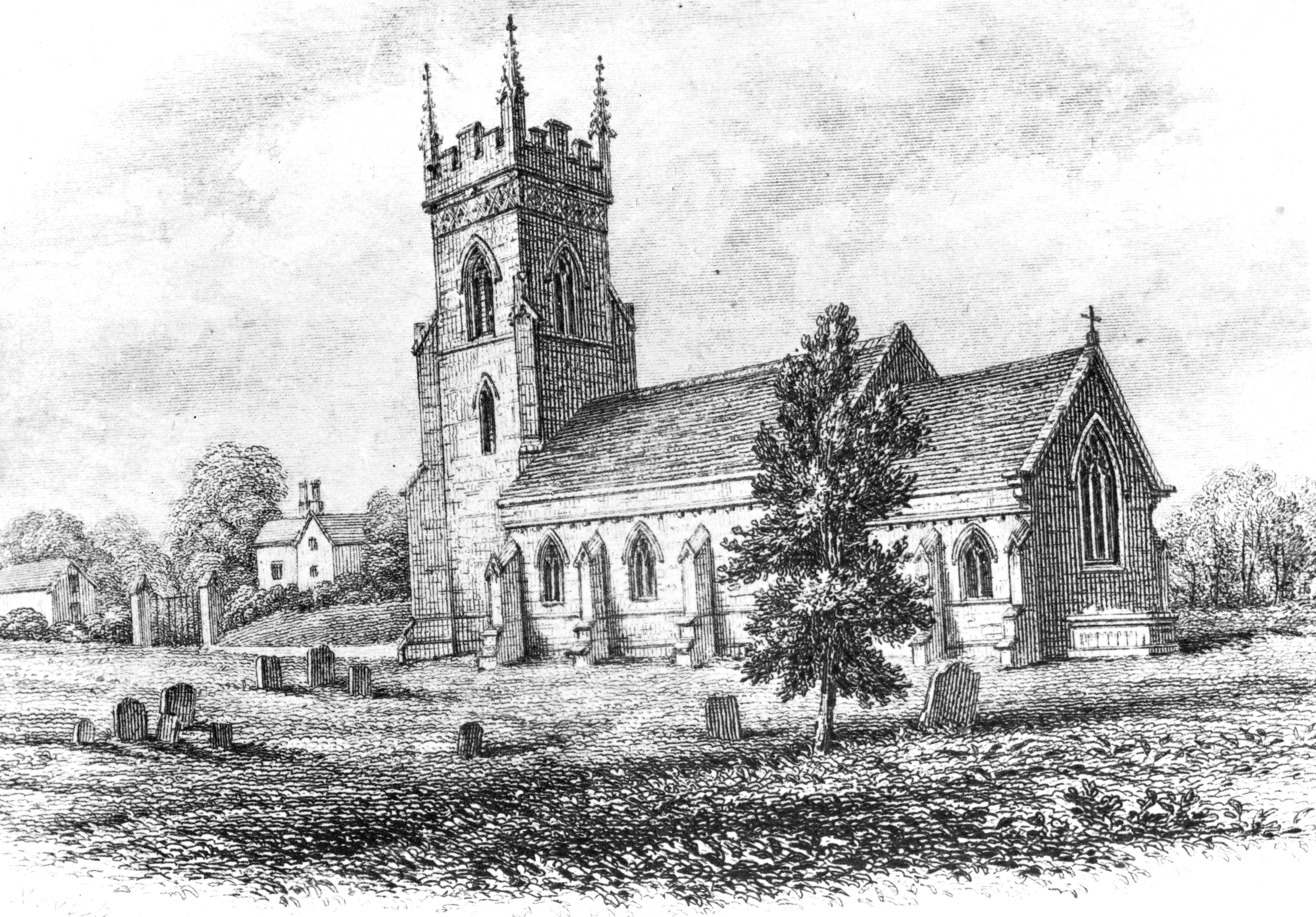
The church as built by Johnson

Building work on Christ Church began in 1844 and was completed in 1847 when the church was consecrated. The church would be the first new parish church in Lichfield since medieval times. The growing population in the west of the city brought the need to build a new church to serve the community in that area.

The 3/4-acre site was given in 1844 by Richard Hinckley the owner of Beacon House and its surrounding estate grounds. The site of the church would be approximately 500m south of Beacon House at the edge of the estate grounds and visible to the Hinckley's from their home. The cost of building the church was provided by Ellen Jane Hinckley, the wife of Richard Hinckley. The church was built with local red sandstone in a Decorated Gothic Revival style under the design of Thomas Johnson of Lichfield. When the church was completed in 1847 in consisted of a chancel, nave and west tower containing a bell cast in 1845 by C. G. Mears of London.

In 1887 the church was enlarged to the designs of Matthew Holding of Northampton. North and south transepts and bays were added. The north extension consisted of a Lady Chapel and the south extension provided the church with an organ chamber and choir vestry. These extensions were partly funded by S.L. Seckham (the new owner of Beacon House) and partly by public subscription. The churchyard was enlarged in 1895 and 1929.

== Notable features ==
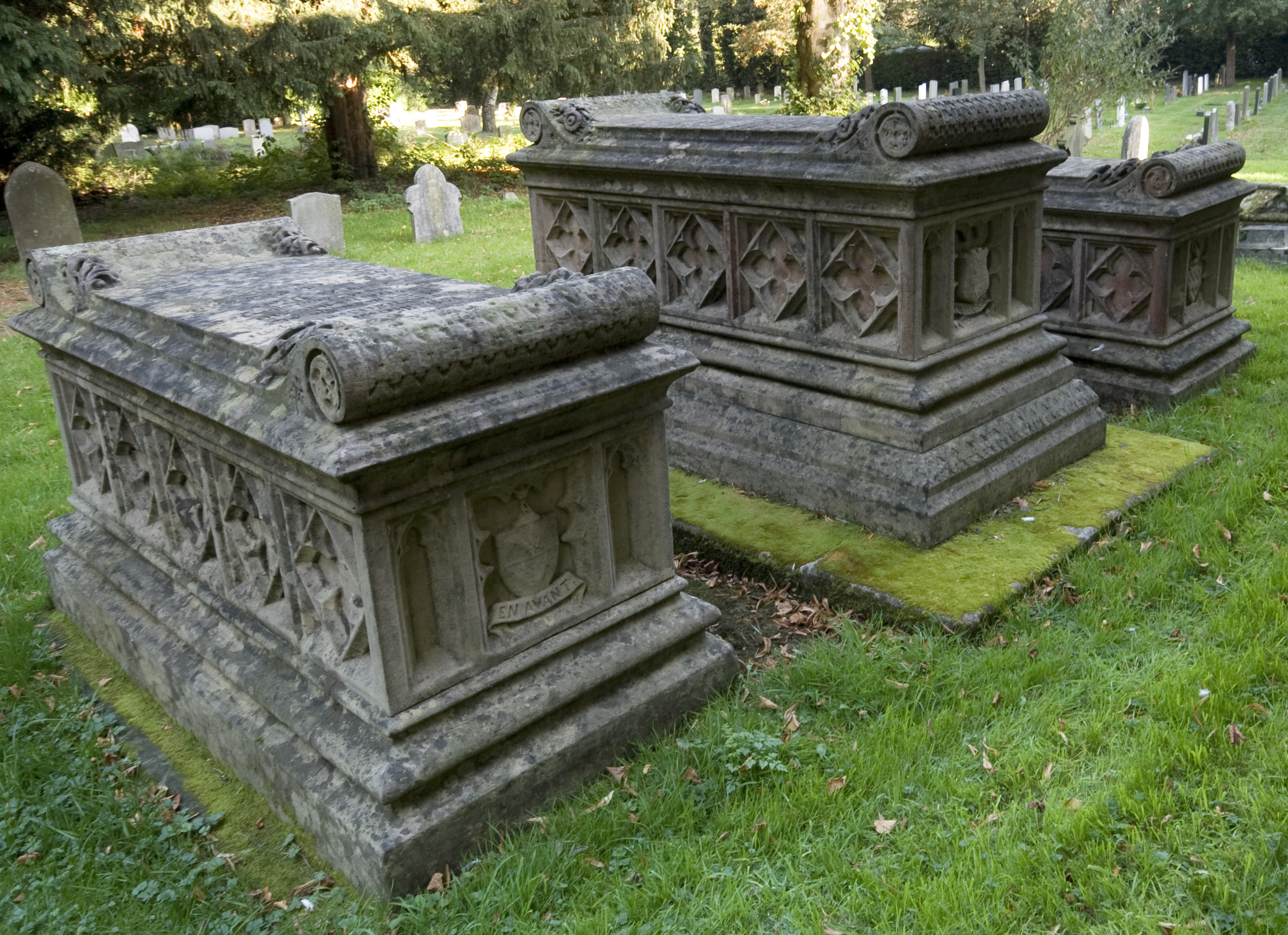
Hinckley Tombs

- The chancel screen was presented to the church by the wife of S. L. Seckham in 1888.
- In 1897 to mark 50 years of the church, Pre-Raphaelite canvas panels painted by John D. Batten were placed on the chancel ceiling depicting Old Testament figures and symbols of Passion and Eucharist.
- The Sanctuary was refurbished in 1906 with alabaster reredos and marble paving by George Frederick Bodley.
- The clock was installed on the tower in 1913, made by A. O. Worthington in memory of his wife Sarah.
- North and south chancel windows, transept east window and nave south window date from the 1870s and 1880’ and were designed by Hardman & Co.
- Charles Eamer Kempe designed glass for the north transept west window in 1894 and the east window in 1920.
- The three tombs of the Hinckley family are located at the rear of the church and are a Grade II listed monument.
- The gravesite of the Seckham family is in a specially located position along the east wall at the rear of the church.
- War grave of World War II Royal Air Force officer.

== Today ==
The church is still an active parish church within the community and holds regular Sunday services at 8am, 9:30am and 6pm. The church holds a Sunday school and is available for weddings, baptisms and funerals.

Christ Church CE (C) Primary School is located adjacent to the church. The school was founded in 1847 and provides education for children aged 4–11.

== See also ==
- Grade II* listed buildings in Lichfield (district)
- Listed buildings in Lichfield
