= Listed buildings in Lichfield =

Lichfield is a civil parish in the district of Lichfield, Staffordshire, England. It contains 244 listed buildings that are recorded in the National Heritage List for England. Of these, six are listed at Grade I, the highest of the three grades, 32 are at Grade II*, the middle grade, and the others are at Grade II, the lowest grade. The parish consists of the cathedral city of Lichfield. Most of the listed buildings in the parish are houses and associated structures, the earliest of which are timber framed or have timber-framed cores, a high proportion are Georgian in style, and some have been converted for other uses including shops and offices. The other listed buildings include churches, the most important being Lichfield Cathedral, and associated structures including memorials in the churchyards. Among the variety of other listed buildings are a holy well, bridges, the remains of earlier fortifications, almshouses, public houses and hotels, public buildings, schools, statues, a clock tower, a fountain, an engine house, a war memorial, and telephone kiosks.

== Key ==
Grade	Criteria
I	Buildings of exceptional interest, sometimes considered to be internationally important
II*	Particularly important buildings of more than special interest
II	Buildings of national importance and special interest

== Buildings ==
Name and location	Photograph	Date	Notes	Grade
St Chad's Well; 52.68968°N 1.82163°W		7th century	The holy well is in the churchyard of St Chad's Church, and its canopy dates from the 20th century. The well is square, and has surrounding paving. The canopy consists of timber posts carrying a pyramidal roof.	II
St Chad's Church; 52.68945°N 1.82092°W		12th century	The tower, east window, and other additions were made in the 13th century, the clerestory was added in the 1660s, the north aisle in 1840, and the porch, chancel roof and vestry in 1862. The church is built in stone, the clerestory is in brick, the aisle roofs are in slate, and the other roofs are tiled. The church consists of a nave, north and south aisles, a porch, a chancel and vestry, and a west tower. The tower has angle buttresses, a southeast stair tower, a three-light west window, a cornice, an embattled parapet, and a scrolled wrought iron weathervane. The east window has five lights.	II*
Lichfield Cathedral; 52.68551°N 1.83047°W		Early 13th century	The cathedral has been altered and extended during the following centuries, including restorations by Sydney Smirke in the 1850s, and between 1856 and 1876 by George Gilbert Scott, continued by John Oldrid Scott. The cathedral is built in stone, and has slate roofs. It has a cruciform plan, consisting of a nave, north and south aisles, north and south transepts with east chapels, a choir with aisles, a north chapter house and a library above, a south consistory court with a chapel above, and a Lady chapel with an apse. There are three steeples, one at the crossing, and two at the west end.	I
Garden wall and gate, 20 St John Street; 52.68165°N 1.82878°W	—	13th century	The wall is in stone with repairs in brick, and it curves round an angle. At the end is a 19th-century gate with a gabled roof, and a pointed arch with an impost and a cornice.	II
St Michael's Church, Greenhill; 52.68318°N 1.81836°W		13th century	The tower dates from the 14th century, much of the church is the result of a restoration in 1842–43, and the chancel was restored in 1890–91 by John Oldrid Scott. The church is in stone with tile roofs, and consists of a nave with a clerestory, north and south aisles, a north porch, a chancel with a south organ front and vestry, and a west steeple. The steeple has a tower in Perpendicular style, with diagonal buttresses, an embattled parapet, and a recessed spire. The porch has two storeys, an embattled parapet, and a moulded arch, over which is niche containing a statue of St Michael.	II*
Lichfield College and Lichfield Library, The Friary; 52.68152°N 1.82959°W		c. 1295	Originally part of a Franciscan Friary, it has been converted into a house, and later a school, the first extension in 1538, and a major expansion in 1921–28. It has a T-shaped plan with a cross-wing at each end. The right cross-wing is the oldest part, it is in stone with some brick and timber framing, and has two storeys and an attic, and a front of three gabled bays. The entrance has a pointed arch, in the ground floor is a mullioned window, the upper floor contains mullioned and transomed windows and the attic windows are casements. The rest of the building is in brick with stone dressings and two storeys. It has a three-bay gabled centre, three bays to the right, six bays to the left, and a gabled wing on the left. The windows are mullioned and transomed, and the gables are coped.	II
Causeway Bridge, Bird Street; 52.68381°N 1.83169°W		c.1300	The bridge carries the road over the southwest end of the Minster Pool, and was rebuilt in 1816 incorporating the medieval causeway. It is stone, and consists of three elliptical arches, the outer arches blind, and has pointed cutwaters and a low moulded parapet with iron railings. There are four openwork boxes with openwork lamp standards.	II
Remains of West Gate, The Close; 52.68482°N 1.83246°W	—	c.1300	The remains of the north side of the west gate of The Close fortifications are in stone, and consist of a wall about two storeys in height with short returns. There is a plinth on the left return, and the wall contains a small segmental-headed entrance.	II
Bastion and walls, Bishop's Palace; 52.68686°N 1.83046°W	—	Early 14th century	The bastion, which has been truncated, and the adjoining wall, are built on the foundations of the medieval close defences. The bastion has a hexagonal plan and a stone base with brick refacing above, stone quoins, brick buttresses, and a later parapet with some stone coping. It contains a window and a doorway with a lintel.	II*
St Mary's House and wall, The Close; 52.68564°N 1.82883°W	—	Early 14th century	The house was extended in about 1710 and in about 1805, and there have been later alterations. It is in stone and brick with brick dressings, rusticated quoins, a string course, a cornice, and a double-span tile roof, hipped to the north. There are two storeys and an entrance front of four bays, the left two bay projecting. The doorway has an architrave, a fanlight and a dentilled cornice, and is flanked by canted bay windows with hipped roofs. Some windows are sashes, and others are casements. The wall is medieval, with a hexagonal stair turret in the angle, the wall extending for about 42 metres (138 ft) to the foundations of the east turret of the south gate.	II*
5 The Close; 52.68496°N 1.83207°W		14th century	The front was refaced in the 18th century. The house has a timber framed core, the front is encased in brick, and the roof is tiled. There are two storeys and a basement, two bays, a right-angle plan, and the gable end faces the close. Opposing steps with a wooden handrail lead up to the doorway, and the windows are casements with segmental heads. At the rear is a moulded bressumer.	II*
6 The Close; 52.68499°N 1.83199°W		14th century	The house, which is timber framed was refronted in brick in the 18th century. It has a plinth containing some stone, a tile roof, two storeys and three bays. Opposing steps with an iron handrail lead up to a doorway with a fanlight. The windows are small-paned cross-casements. At the rear is brick underbuilding and a moulded bressumer, a doorway and varied windows.	II*
23 Bird Street; 52.68303°N 1.83061°W	—	15th century (probable)	The shop, which has a timber framed core, was altered in the 18th century and later, and has a brick front with a modillion cornice and a tile roof. There are two storeys, three bays, and a rear gabled wing. The doorway has incised pilasters and a fanlight, and is flanked by shop windows, all under a frieze and a cornice. The upper floor contains small-paned casement windows, and inside, there is considerable timber framing.	II
7 The Close; 52.68502°N 1.83186°W		15th century	The house was later reconstructed in the southeast corner. It is on a corner site and is timber framed, the ground floor has been underbuilt in stone, and the roof is tiled. There are two storeys and an attic, and two bays, the left bay wider and gabled, and the right bay plastered with a cornice. The doorway has pilaster strips, a fanlight, a frieze, and a cornice. Some windows are sashes, some are casements, and in the right bay is a gabled dormer.	II*
10 The Close; 52.68527°N 1.83205°W		15th century (probable)	The house, which was altered in about 1600, is in timber framing and painted brick, and has a tile roof. There are two storeys, a right-angle plan, and a front of three bays. The upper storey is jettied and underbuilt, and has a coved soffit, and the gable is also jettied with bargeboards. In the ground floor are casement windows, the upper floor contains a continuous oriel window, and all the windows have leaded lights. The doorway is in the right return, and has a canopy.	II*
11 The Close; 52.68523°N 1.83218°W	—	15th century (probable)	The house, which was extensively altered in the 17th century, is in stuccoed brick, with bands and a tile roof. There are two storeys and attics, and an L-shaped plan, with each front having two bays and a gable with bargeboards and finials. The doorway has a bracketed canopy, and the windows are a mix of sashes and casements.	II
1–12 and 12A Vicars' Close and Vicars' Hall; 52.68535°N 1.83258°W		15th century	Four ranges of houses round a courtyard, mostly timber framed, with some brick rebuilding and underbuilding, and tile roofs. Most of the houses have two storeys. some of the upper storeys are jettied. The windows are mainly casements, some with segmental heads, and there are dormers, and a 19th-century oriel window. Vicars' Hall faces Beacon Street, it is in brick and has two storeys with a coped gable containing a roundel. The doorway has a canopy, and the windows are sashes.	II*
24 The Close, wall and gate pier 52.68484°N 1.83153°W	—	c. 1461	The house, which has been extensively remodelled, is in brick with some stone, and has a tile roof. There are two storeys, an attic and a basement, and three bays, the outer bays gabled, and the right bay recessed; the gables have decorative bargeboards. The porch in the middle bay has an elliptical arch, a cornice and a parapet. To the left is a window with a stucco surround and three ogee-headed lights containing sashes, the other windows being sashes with plain surrounds. In the left gable is a blocked window with a four-centred arched head. Attached to the right is a short wall with a gate and a pier.	II*
23A and 23B The Close, wall and gate 52.68489°N 1.83131°W	—	Late 15th century	The house, now divided into two, was remodelled in the 18th century, and further remodelled and the front replaced in about 1812. It is in red brick with some blue brick diapering and stone, and has a tile roof with crow-stepped gables. The house is in Gothic style, and has a double-depth plan, two storeys and a basement, a symmetrical front of five bays, a recessed block connecting to No. 24, and a rear wing on the left. The front has a top cornice, an embattled parapet and gabled kneelers. The porch has angle buttresses and a four-centred arch, and the windows are sashes with hood moulds. The rear wing contains a segmental-headed coach entrance, casement windows and a triangular oriel window. Attached to the left is a brick wall with an embattled parapet, and gabled gate piers with pointed panels.	II*
Hospital of St John Baptist without the Barrs and Chapel; 52.68012°N 1.82745°W		1495	Almshouses and a chapel that have been altered and extended, the latest in 1966–67 by Louis de Soissons. The almshouses are in brick with stone dressings and a tile roof, and the chapel is in stone. The almshouses have two storeys and a U-shaped plan, and a front of nine bays with eight projecting chimney stacks. In the centre is a Tudor arched entrance, over which is a cartouche and a coat of arms. The chapel to the north has a nave, a north aisle, and a sanctuary.	I
Master's House, St John Street; 52.68020°N 1.82798°W		c. 1495	The Master's House at the rear of St John's Hospital is in brick with stone dressings, quoins, and a slate roof. It is in Georgian style, and has three storeys, and a doorway with moulded pilaster strips, a frieze, and a cornice. The windows are a mix of sashes and casements, most with segmental heads.	I
15 Bird Street and 2 Sandford Street; 52.68271°N 1.83020°W	—	c. 1500	The building, on a corner site, has a timber framed core, with was later extended, refronted in about 1800, and later altered. It is in red brick with a plastered rear wing, a cornice, a coped parapet, and a tile roof, hipped to the left. There are two storeys, four bays on Bird Street, four bays on Sandford Street, and beyond that is the rear wing. On the corner is a recessed shop front. In the upper floor are sash windows, there are blind windows in the ground floor on Sandford Street, and casement windows in the wing. Inside is substantial remaining timber framing.	II
Cruck House, Stowe Street; 52.68680°N 1.82265°W		Late 15th or early 16th century	The house, which was restored in 1971, is timber framed with cruck construction on a stone plinth, and has a tile roof. There is a single-storey and a half-loft, and two bays. The windows have leaded glazing, and at the rear is a gabled porch.	II*
Milley's Hospital, Beacon Street; 52.68543°N 1.83348°W		1504	The almshouses were extended at the rear in the 18th century, restored in 1906, and further extended in 1985–87. It is in red brick with stone dressings, quoins and a tile roof. It is in Tudor style, and has two storeys and an attic, and a front of five bays. In the centre is a projecting two-storey gabled porch containing a doorway with an elliptical arch. Over the doorway is a casement window with a panelled pilasters, a pediment and an inscribed apron panel. Flanking the porch on each side are a single light window and a three-light window with chamfered mullions, and there are two gabled dormers.	II*
32 Bore Street; 52.68294°N 1.82743°W		Early 16th century	A house, later a café, it is timber framed with a brick rear range and wing, and a tile roof. There are three storeys, three gabled bays, a rear wing and a rear block. The upper storeys and gables are jettied, and the gables have finials and pendants. In the ground floor is a doorway with moulded posts, this is flanked by canted oriel windows, and to the left is an entry. In the middle floor are three-light transomed windows, and in the top floor are two-light casement windows in moulded frames. At the rear are bands and a modillion cornice, and most of the windows are casements.	II*
13 and 14 The Close, wall, gate piers and overthrow 52.68560°N 1.83196°W	—	c. 1527 (probable)	The house, partly used later for other purposes, was refronted in the 18th century, and the wing was added in 1772–1800. It is in brick with stone dressings, sill bands, a top cornice and parapet, and a double-span tile roof, partly hipped. It is in Georgian style, and has two storeys. The main block has a symmetrical front of seven bays, the outer three bays on each side canted, and to the right is a long projecting wing with a canted end. The doorway has pilasters with fluted capitals, an architrave, entablature blocks, a frieze, and a modillion cornice. The windows are sashes, and inside there is some timber framing. At the front is a low stone-coped brick wall with stone gate piers and an iron overthrow with a lantern.	II
7 Church Street; 52.68392°N 1.82174°W	—	16th century	The house has been extended and altered, the original part is timber framed, it has been rebuilt and extended in red brick, and has a tile roof. There are two storeys, a front of two bays, and a rear wing with exposed timber framing and brick infill. There is a doorway on the right, and the windows are casements, all with segmental heads.	II
12 and 14 Dam Street; 52.68443°N 1.82803°W	—	Mid 16th century	A pair of timber framed houses that were refaced in brick in the 18th century, and later used for other purposes. They have a modillion cornice, a tile roof, two storeys and two bays. Both houses have doorways with segmental heads. No. 12 has a bow window in the ground floor and a sash window above, and in No. 14 the windows are casements.	II
The Swan, Bird Street; 52.68324°N 1.83098°W	—	16th century	A coaching inn, later used for other purposes, most of the building dates from the 17th and 18th centuries, and it was refronted in the late 18th century. It consists of two ranges, and is in brick with modillion cornices, and roofs mainly in tile with some slate. The building is in Georgian style, with an L-shaped plan, each range has three storeys, the left range has a front of six bays, the right range has five bays, and there is a rear two-storey wing. The left range has a doorway approached by opposing steps with railings, and has an architrave, a fanlight and a cornice. The windows are sashes, some with friezes and cornices. In the left bay of the right range is a carriage entrance with a rusticated segmental arch and a keystone, above it is a lunette, and over that is a wrought iron sign bracket. The other windows on the front are sashes, and in the right return is a French window.	II
25 Dam Street; 52.68461°N 1.82849°W	—	Mid to late 16th century	A timber framed house with brick to the ground floor, and a tile roof. There are two storeys, two bays, and a gabled rear wing. In the ground floor are casement windows with segmental heads, and a doorway to the left. The upper floor contains gabled half-dormers.	II
6 Sandford Street; 52.68256°N 1.83056°W	—	Mid to late 16th century	A house, later a shop, in brick, with a timber framed upper storey and a stuccoed lower storey on the front, a top decorated frieze on brackets, and a double-span tile roof. It is in Elizabethan style, and has a double-depth plan, two storeys and three bays. In the ground floor is a central shop window, three doorways and a smaller window, and the upper floor contains three sash windows in moulded frames. At the rear is a lower cross-wing, and some of the windows are casements.	II
11 and 13 Market Street; 52.68295°N 1.82931°W		Late 16th century (probable)	A pair of timber framed shops, stuccoed and with tile roofs. There are two storeys and attic, six bays, three jettied gables, and gabled brick wings at the rear. In the ground floor are recessed shop fronts, the upper floor contains sash windows in architraves, and in the gables is exposed timber framing and two-light mullioned windows.	II
16 and 16A Market Street; 52.68296°N 1.82883°W	—	Late 16th century	An office and shop in timber framing with some brick, it has three storeys, two bays, and two rear gabled wings. In the ground floor is a 20th-century shop front on a brick plinth with an entry to the right. The upper storeys are jettied with moulded bressumers. The middle floor contains two canted oriel windows on shaped brackets, and in the top floor are two mullioned windows.	II
Causeway House, 18 Dam Street; 52.68455°N 1.82817°W	—	Late 16th century	A house, later offices, it was restored in the 20th century. The building is timber framed with some underbuilding in brick, and has a tile roof. There are two storeys, three bays, with two gables and a half-gable to the left, and a rear wing. The upper storey is partly jettied and has a moulded bressumer. There are two doorways with Tudor arched heads, and to the right are a three-light window and a canted bay window. The upper floor contains windows with two and four lights.	II
St Mary's Chambers, Breadmarket Street; 52.68329°N 1.82766°W		c. 1600	A house that was altered in about 1760, later offices. The rear is timber framed, the front is in brick with stone dressings, and is in Georgian style, and the roof is tiled. The building is on a plinth, and has a top modillion cornice. There are three storeys and a basement and two bays. The central doorway is approached by steps with handrails, and has an elliptical head, an architrave and a fanlight with radial bars, and to the left is a smaller doorway with a chamfered lintel. On the left of the main doorway is a canted oriel window with an entablature, and under it is a shuttered basement opening. To the right of the doorway is a bowed oriel window with an entablature and a fluted frieze, and under it is a pair of bowed doors. The middle floor contains Venetian windows in architraves containing sashes, and in the top floor are sash windows in architraves. At the rear is a timber-framed wing and a brick wing.	II*
38–44 Bore Street; 52.68330°N 1.82683°W	—	Late 16th to early 17th century	A row of five houses, later used for other purposes, they are timber framed, with extensive restoration and alterations in brick and concrete in the 1960s. The roof is tiled, there are two storeys and five gabled bays. The entrances are recessed behind concrete posts and beams, and the windows in the upper floor are casements.	II
22 Market Street; 52.68306°N 1.82860°W	—	Late 16th to early 17th century	A shop with a timber framed crore that was refaced in brick in the 19th century, it has a plain parapet and a tile roof, two storeys and an attic, and one bay. In the ground floor is a 20th-century shop front, the upper floor contains a sash window, and there is a flat-roofed dormer. Inside there are timber-framed walls.	II
45 and 47 Stowe Street; 52.68617°N 1.82326°W	—	Late 16th to early 17th century (probable)	A pair of houses, altered later, in brick with a timber framed core, No. 47 is stuccoed, and the roof is tiled. There are two storeys, four bays and two rear wings. The left house has casement windows. The right house has bracketed eaves, a doorway with buttresses, a frieze and a brattished cornice, and panelled reveals. The windows are three-light sashes with Tudor arched heads and hood moulds. There is exposed timber framing in the right return, one rear wing is pebbledashed and has a weatherboarded gable, and the other wing has exposed timber framing.	II
Garage, 15 The Close; 52.68589°N 1.83146°W	—	Late 16th to early 17th century	Probably originally a barn, later altered and used as a garage, it is timber framed, with infill and rebuilding in brick, and has a tile roof. There is a mullioned square opening above the main doorway, and the doorways and windows have segmental heads.	II
67 and 69 Tamworth Street; 52.68398°N 1.82358°W	—	Early 17th century	A house, later two shops, that have been remodelled. They are in painted brick on a timber framed core, with a tile roof, a double-depth plan, two storeys and attics, one bay each, and two gabled rear wings. Steps lead up to the doorways in the centre that have segmental heads, the windows are modern, most with segmental heads, and there are two flat-roofed dormers. Inside both shops are timber-framed partitions.	II
6 Dam Street; 52.68421°N 1.82767°W	—	c. 1650	A shop with a timber framed core that was refaced in the 18th century. It is in stuccoed brick with a top frieze and cornice, and a tile roof. There is a double-depth plan, two storeys and an attic, and two bays. To the right is a doorway with a bracketed cornice, and to the left is a fixed window. The upper floor contains a sash window, and above is a hipped dormer. At the rear is a gabled wing that has bands and casement windows with segmental heads, and there is a 19th-century cross-wing.	II
19 Dam Street; 52.68444°N 1.82827°W	—	17th century (probable)	A shop with a timber framed core, refaced in brick in about 1820, stuccoed on the front, with a top frieze and a tile roof. There are two storeys, an L-shaped plan, with a front of three bays and a rear gabled wing. In the centre is a shop front with pilasters, a frieze, and a cornice, and a door with a fanlight. To the left is an entry, and to the right is a small-paned window. The upper floor contains two sash windows, and a small window on the left. Inside is exposed timber framing.	II
20 and 22 Dam Street; 52.68461°N 1.82821°W	—	17th century	A pair of houses that were much rebuilt in about 1810, and later a shop. It is in Georgian style, and built in brick with stone dressings and a coped parapet. There is a double-depth plan, three storeys, and five bays. The central doorway has pilasters, a panelled frieze, and a bracketed cornice. To the right is a smaller doorway with a flat head and a keystone, and the windows are sashes with keystones.	II
7, 9 and 11 Lombard Street; 52.68432°N 1.82508°W	—	17th century	A pair of houses with a timber framed core, later altered and used for other purposes. They have two storeys, two bays each, a tile roof, and doorways with segmental heads. The left building has a band, a cogged cornice, and small-paned casement windows with segmental heads. The ground floor of the right building has underbuilding in brick, a moulded bressumer, and exposed timber framing in the upper floor. In the ground floor is a shop front, and the upper floor contains casement windows.	II
9, 9A and 9B The Close; 52.68518°N 1.83197°W	—	17th century (probable)	A house, later used for other purposes, it was remodelled in the 18th century, and altered in the 19th century. It is in brick, the front painted, with stone dressings, a band, a moulded cornice, and a tile roof with two coped gables. There are three storeys, a double-depth plan, and a symmetrical front of five bays. In the centre is a two-storey canted bay window with bands, a top cornice and an embattled parapet. The doorways have panelled pilaster strips, fanlights, and bracketed canopies. The windows are sashes, most with segmental heads, and in the gables are slits.	II
Quonians House, wall and outbuilding, 8 Dam Street; 52.68427°N 1.82777°W	—	17th century (probable)	The house on a corner site, which possibly has a timber framed core, was refaced in brick in the 18th century. It is in Georgian style, and has a top frieze and cornice, and a tile roof. There are two storeys and an attic, and a front of four bays. The doorway has pilasters, a fanlight, an entablature, and a pediment. The windows are sashes, above the doorway is a blind window, and there is a hipped dormer. In the left return is a segmental-headed sash window and a roundel in the gable. At the rear are single-storey wings, and a wall links the house to an outbuilding.	II
49 and 49A Tamworth Street; 52.68405°N 1.82424°W	—	Mid to late 17th century	A house, later used for other purposes, it is in brick with a stuccoed front and a timber framed core, two bands, and a tile roof. There are two storeys and an attic, a double-depth plan, a front of three bays, and three gables at the rear with exposed timber framing. The doorway has an architrave and a bracketed pediment, and there is a smaller round-headed door to the right. To the left is a bow window with panelled pilasters, a frieze, and a cornice, and to the right is a small-paned fixed window. The upper floor contains a central blind window flanked by sash windows, and above are three gabled dormers.	II
12 and 12A Lombard Street; 52.68436°N 1.82469°W	—	Late 17th century (probable)	The building, which was altered in the 20th century, consists of a house and an office, with a workshop on the right. It is in brick, roughcast on the front, and with a tile roof, hipped to the right. There are two storeys and four bays, the second bay gabled, the fourth bay a cross-wing, and there is a 19th-century rear wing. The main doorway has a panelled surround, a fanlight, and a cornice, and the windows are casements.	II
15 The Close; 52.68575°N 1.83159°W	—	Late 17th century	The house incorporates earlier material, and was extended in about 1800. It is stuccoed, and has tile roofs. The main block has two storeys and an attic, and two gables with a parapet between, there is a two-storey wing to the left, a single-storey projecting wing on the right, and a double-depth rear wing with a single-storey service wing. The entrance has a porch with panelled pilasters, a frieze and a cornice. Most of the windows on the front are sash windows, with casements in the attic. On the right return are three gables, and the windows vary.	II
Cathedral Visitors' Study Centre, wall and gate 52.68529°N 1.82934°W	—	Late 17th century	Originally a stable and coach house, later used for other purposes, it incorporates medieval material. The building is in stone with some brick, and has hipped tile roofs. There are two storeys and an L-shaped plan. On the front is a round-headed entrance over which is a re-set medieval gargoyle, a painted sign, and slit windows. Elsewhere the windows are a mix of casements, mullioned windows, and gabled dormers. At the rear is a garden wall containing paired gates that have piers with caps.	II*
Monument, St Michael's Church; 52.68354°N 1.81901°W	—	1677	The monument is in the churchyard and is in stone. It has a rectangular plan and has a central pointed arch. There are relief carvings of lozenges and a roundel, and worn inscriptions.	II
Lichfield District Council Offices (part), wall and gates, St John Street; 52.68078°N 1.82767°W	—	1682	Originally houses for Lichfield Grammar School, with a rear wing, school room and wall added in about 1849. It is in brick with a hipped tile roof. The original part is in Georgian style, it has two storeys and an attic, a double-depth plan, a symmetrical front of five bays, four bays on the right return, a plinth, bands, and a modillion cornice. The central doorway has a moulded surround, a pulvinated frieze and a cornice, the windows are sashes in the ground floor, casements in the upper floor, and there are two hipped dormers. At the rear is a two-bay stuccoed extension, and a school room in brick with stone dressings and coped gables. The wall that encloses the area is in brick with stone coping, and contains cross-slits under gablets, a gateway with an elliptical head, and decorative wrought iron gates.	II
Gregory headstone, St Michael's Church; 52.68379°N 1.81823°W	—	c. 1687	The headstone is in the churchyard and is to the memory of Mary Gregory. It has a cushion panel in roll moulding, on the top are moulded cherubs and end scrolls, and there is a well cut inscription.	II
Lichfield Cathedral School; 52.68590°N 1.83117°W		1687–88	The school occupies the former Bishop's Palace, to which the wings and a chapel were added in 1869. The building is in stone, and has a hipped tile roof. It has a U-shaped plan, with the wings making an H-shaped plan, and the chapel in a rear angle. The building is in Queen Anne style, and has two storeys, an attic and a basement, a front of seven bays, the middle three bays projecting under a pediment containing a coat of arms. It is on a plinth, and has a band, a modillion cornice, and rusticated quoins. Steps lead up to the doorway that has an architrave, a frieze, and a segmental pediment on consoles. Most of the windows are casements, and there are hipped dormers.	I
Front wall and gate piers, Former Bishop's Palace; 52.68601°N 1.83029°W	—	c. 1687–88	The wall along the front of the forecourt is in stone, on a plinth, and has moulded coping. It stretches for 82 metres (269 ft), and contains three gateways. The main gateway has rusticated piers with cornice caps, and buttresses on the inner faces, and the other gate piers are plainer.	II
Taylor headstone, St Chad's Church; 52.68934°N 1.82076°W	—	c. 1689	The headstone is in the churchyard and is to the memory of William Taylor and Susannah who died later. It is in stone and has a cushion panel and an enriched top.	II
Croft headstone, St Chad's Church; 52.68924°N 1.82076°W	—	c. 1697	The headstone is in the churchyard, and is to the memory of William Croft. It is a plain stone, and h\as a well-cut inscription.	II
9 and 11 Dam Street; 52.68429°N 1.82806°W	—	c. 1700	A pair of houses, later used for other purposes, they are stuccoed with some timber framing, a top cornice, and a tile roof. There are two storeys and an attic, and two bays. Each doorway has a cornice, No. 9 has pilasters and a reeded frieze, and No. 11 has reeded pilasters and a frieze. In No. 11 is a shop window, the other windows are casements, and there are two gabled dormers. Inside there is exposed timber framing.	II
20 St John Street; 52.68147°N 1.82868°W		c. 1700	The house was later extended and used as offices. It is in brick with plaster dressings on a plinth, with a top cornice and a tile roof. It is in early Georgian style, and has two storeys, a basement and an attic, four bays, a double-depth plan, and side and rear wings. In the centre is a doorway with an architrave and a bracketed canopy. There are two basement openings, the windows on the front are casements, and there are two gabled dormers. At the rear are a mix of casement and sash windows.	II*
13 Dam Street; 52.68434°N 1.82813°W	—	Late 17th or early 18th century (probable)	a shop in painted brick with a timber framed core and a tile roof. There are three storeys, an L-shaped plan, and a front of one bay. In the ground floor is a shop window and a doorway under a fascia, and the upper floors contain small-paned casement windows. Inside there is exposed timber framing.	II
5 and 7 Greenhill; 52.68389°N 1.82296°W	—	Late 17th or early 18th century	A pair of shops that are stuccoed on timber framing, and have a top cornice and a tile roof. There is one storey and an attic, an L-shaped plan, two bays, and a rear wing. In the ground floor are two doorways, two shop windows with pilasters, a frieze, and a cornice, and a small window to the right. The attic contains two flat-roofed dormers.	II
25 Lombard Street; 52.68469°N 1.82471°W	—	Late 17th or early 18th century	A house, later an office, in brick with some timber framing, on a plastered plinth, with a top cornice and a tile roof. There are two storeys, three bays, and a rear wing on the left. The doorway has panelled pilasters, a frieze, and a cornice, and to the left is a segmental-headed carriage entrance. The windows are sashes and have segmental heads, and at the rear is some exposed timber framing.	II
1 Quonian's Lane; 52.68439°N 1.82785°W	—	Late 17th or early 18th century (probable)	A house, later an office, it is timber framed with brick infill, and has a tile roof, two storeys, and two bays. Above the doorway on the left is a canopy on carved wooden figures, over which is a wrought iron bracket. To the right is another entrance, over which is a plaque with a relief depicting Saint Christopher. In both floors there are oriel windows.	II
41, 43 and 45 Tamworth Street; 52.68404°N 1.82457°W	—	Late 17th or early 18th century	Three houses, later shops, with partial refronting and a rear wing added in the 20th century. They are timber framed, No. 41 has a plastered front, the other shops have plastered ground floors and exposed timber framing with plaster infill above, and the roof is tiled. In the ground floor are two entrances and shop windows, the upper floor contains casement windows, and inside are timber-framed cross-walls.	II
Ardmore Cottage, Nether Beacon House and Ardmore House, Beacon Street; 52.68769°N 1.83633°W	—	Late 17th or early 18th century	A house later altered and extended and divided into three. It is timber framed with brick infill on a stone plinth, and has a hipped tile roof. There are two storeys, a double-depth plan, three gabled bays, later single-storey wings on both ends, and a rear range. In the centre are two porches with Tudor arches and Art Nouveau iron gates, and the windows have three lights and cornices. In the left return are three flat-roofed dormers. The rear range has three storeys, four bays, a modillion cornice, coped gables, and sash windows.	II
Netherstowe House; 52.69608°N 1.81695°W	—	Late 17th or early 18th century	A mill and a mill owner's house of about 1800, both converted into houses. They are in brick with some stone and tile roofs, and form two parallel ranges. The north range has three storeys, four bays, a frieze with applied timber framing, and a hipped roof, and the south range has two storeys and three bays. The windows are a mix of sashes and casements.	II
Sundial, Lichfield Cathedral; 52.68520°N 1.83061°W		17th or early 18th century (probable)	The sundial is to the south of the cathedral, and is in stone. It has a plinth, and a tall quatrefoil pier with a ring and a moulded capital. On this is a cube with dials and gnomons on each face, and a reeded domical cap.	II
Johnson Birthplace Museum, Breadmarket Street; 52.68343°N 1.82796°W		1707	A house and bookshop, later a museum and bookshop, it was the birthplace of Samuel Johnson. The building, on a corner site, has a timber framed core, a stuccoed exterior, a modillion cornice, and a tile roof, hipped to the right. It is in Georgian style, with three storeys and a front of five bays. The first floor is jettied on three columns, the central column in Doric style and the outer columns Tuscan. In the centre are paired doorways with pilaster strips, friezes and cornices, approached by opposing steps. The windows are sashes with moulded surrounds. In the left return is exposed timber framing. The front on Market Street has two bays, a doorway, a shop window, and a gabled dormer.	I
The Deanery and gate, The Close; 52.68590°N 1.83117°W		c. 1707	The deanery, which was later altered, is in brick with stone dressings, on a plinth with moulded coping, and has a band, a modillion cornice, and a hipped tile roof. It is in Queen Anne style, with two storeys and a symmetrical front of seven bays, the middle three bays projecting under a pediment. The entrance has fluted Tuscan pilasters, an entablature, and a segmental pediment, the doorway has an architrave, and the windows on the front are sashes. At the rear is a single-storey 19th-century wing, attached to which is an 18th-century gate that has brick piers with pointed oval finials, elaborate wrought iron gates and an overthrow.	II*
Garden wall and gate piers, The Deanery; 52.68575°N 1.83100°W	—	c. 1707	The wall at the front of the garden is in brick with stone dressings and stone coping. It extends for about 37.5 metres (123 ft), it is recessed towards the gateway on the right, and there is a left return wall about 15 metres (49 ft) long. The stone gate piers are rusticated with ball finials.	II
2, 3 and 4 The Close; 52.68490°N 1.83226°W	—	c. 1720	Two houses, one converted into two, in brick with bands, a top cornice, and a double-span tile roof. They are in Georgian style, with three storeys and a basement, eight bays, and a single-storey wing on the left. Opposing flights of steps with railings lead up to the doorways. The doorway to No. 2 has pilasters and a bracketed cornice, that to No, 3 has an architrave, a frieze, and a cornice on consoles, and the doorway of No. 4 has an architrave, a frieze, and a pediment. In No. 4 is a canted oriel window with a hipped roof, the top floor contains horizontally-sliding sash windows, there are various openings in the basement, and the other windows are sashes.	II
Two cartouche headstones, St Chad's Church; 52.68921°N 1.82077°W	—	c. 1720	The headstones are in the churchyard, and are in stone. Each headstone has a cartouche with scrolled cresting, and one has a cherub on the head. The inscriptions are worn.	II*
7 and 9 Breadmarket Street; 52.68337°N 1.82779°W		Early 18th century	A public house, later shops and an office, it is stuccoed, with two bands, a top frieze and cornice, and a tile roof. The building is in Georgian style, with three storeys, and five bays. In the ground floor is a central carriageway, to the left is an altered shop front, and to the right are two traditional shop fronts, the first with a recessed doorway and a bow window, and the other with sash windows and a doorway with a fanlight. Most of the windows in the upper floors are sashes, and there are two casement windows in the top floor of the right bay.	II
33 Market Street; 52.68351°N 1.82824°W	—	Early 18th century	A shop and office with a timber framed core and a stuccoed brick front, bands, a plain parapet, and a tile roof. The building is in Georgian style, with three storeys, five bays, and at the rear are a tall gabled wing with exposed timber framing, lower plastered wings, and 20th-century flat-roofed extensions. On the front is a shop front with moulded pilasters, a recessed doorway with a fanlight, under the windows are aprons, and above are a frieze and a cornice. To the left is an entrance with an architrave, and to the right is a doorway with a fanlight. The upper floors contain sash windows.	II
39 Market Street; 52.68362°N 1.82805°W	—	Early 18th century	A shop with a timber framed core and a stuccoed front, quoins, a top cornice and a parapet. It is in Georgian style, with three storeys, two bays, and a rear timber-framed gabled wing. In the ground floor is a shop front with a recessed doorway, an entry to the right, and a fascia and canopy above them. The upper floors contain sash windows with wedge lintels and keystones, those in the top floor also with aprons.	II
23 and 25 St John Street; 52.68147°N 1.82832°W	—	Early 18th century (probable)	A pair of shops in brick, partly roughcast, with a tile roof. Each shop has one storey and an attic, and a single gabled bay. In the ground floor are shop fronts with recessed doorways, and the attics contain casement windows.	II
11, 11A and 13 Tamworth Street; 52.68381°N 1.82614°W	—	Early 18th century (probable)	A pair of houses, later shops, they are stuccoed with some timber framing, a top cornice, and a double-span tile roof. There are three storeys, a double-depth plan, a front of two bays, and a rear two-storey gabled wing. In the ground floor are shop fronts, the middle floor contains two sash windows, the left in an architrave, and the right with a cornice, and in the top floor are casement windows. There is exposed timber framing in the right return of the rear gable.	II
Stowe House, Netherstowe; 52.68944°N 1.81946°W		Early 18th century	A house, later extended and used for other purposes, it is in brick with stone dressings, quoins, a modillion cornice, a coped parapet, and a hipped slate roof. It is in early Georgian style, and has three storeys and a basement, a symmetrical front of five bays, the middle bay projecting forward, an L-shaped plan, and later extensions to the rear. Steps lead up to the central doorway that has an Ionic surround, an entablature with a pulvinated frieze, and a segmental pediment. The windows are sashes with architraves.	II*
Donegal House and railings, Bore Street; 52.68295°N 1.82723°W		1730	A house, later used for other purposes, in early Georgian style, it is built in brick with dressings in stucco and stone. It is on a plinth, and has a sill band, Doric end pilasters with triglyph entablature blocks, and a top cornice and parapet. There are three storeys and a basement, and a symmetrical front of five bays. Steps with iron handrails lead up to the central doorway that has attached Tuscan columns, an entablature, and a segmental pediment. The windows are sashes, in the basement they have segmental heads, and in the upper floors they have shaped lintels and keystones. The window above the doorway has an architrave with a triglyph, a frieze and a pediment. Protruding from the left pilaster is a clock on elaborate brackets, and the basement area is enclosed by iron railings with decorative heads.	II*
17 Bird Street; 52.68281°N 1.83032°W	—	Early to mid 18th century	A house, later used for other purposes, it is in brick with stone dressings, a cornice over the middle floor, a top modillion cornice, and a hipped tile roof. The building is in early Georgian style, with three storeys, and a symmetrical front of five bays. The central entrance has an architrave with a triple keystone, panelled pilaster strips, a cornice on consoles, and a recessed doorway. It is flanked by shop windows, also with panelled pilaster strips, and cornices on consoles. The upper floors contain sash windows with shaped lintels and keystones, those in the top floor with segmental heads, and those in the middle floor with sills and shaped aprons.	II
12 and 14 Conduit Street; 52.68386°N 1.82692°W	—	Early to mid 18th century	A house, later two shops, in brick with stone dressings, a top cornice, and a hipped tile roof. It is in Georgian style, with three storeys, and a symmetrical front of five bays. In the ground floor are 20th-century shop fronts, and the upper storeys contain sash windows with wedge lintels and keystones, those in the middle bay with architraves and triple keystones.	II
28 Market Street; 52.68326°N 1.82828°W	—	Early to mid 18th century	A stuccoed shop with a top cornice, a tile roof, three storeys, three bays, and a later rear wing. In the ground floor is a late 20th-century shop front, the middle floor contains casement windows, and in the top floor are a two-light and a five-light window.	II
41 and 43 Market Street; 52.68368°N 1.82795°W	—	Early to mid 18th century	A pair of stuccoed shops with a coped parapet, a shaped gable on No. 41, and a hipped tile roof. They are in Georgian style, with three storeys, a right angle plan, four bays, and two plastered gables at the rear. In the ground floor are 20th-century shop fronts, and in the upper floors are sash windows with wedge lintels and keystones.	II
27 St John Street; 52.68138°N 1.82826°W	—	Early to mid 18th century	A shop in brick with stone dressings on a stone plinth, with a sill band, a top cornice, a parapet, and a tile roof. There are two storeys, one bay, and a rear wing. In the ground floor is a doorway with a cornice, to the right is an entry with a rusticated wedge lintel and a keystone, and to the left is a window with pilasters, a frieze and a cornice. The upper floor contains a casement window with a rusticated wedge lintel and a keystone.	II
29 St John Street; 52.68134°N 1.82819°W	—	Early to mid 18th century	A shop in brick with stone dressings, possibly incorporating earlier timber framing, with a band, a top cornice, a parapet, and a tile roof with a coped gable to the right. There are two low storeys, two bays, and a rear wing. In the ground floor is a 19th-century shop front with an entablature. To the left and in the upper floor are sash windows with segmental heads.	II
42 and 44 Tamworth Street; 52.68391°N 1.82451°W	—	Early to mid 18th century	A house that was later used for other purposes, it probably contains earlier material. It is in painted brick and timber framing, on a plaster plinth, with a modillion cornice, and a tile roof. There are two storeys, an L-shaped plan, a front of two bays, and a lower rear wing with later additions. On the front are two doorways, the windows are casements, and in the left gable end is exposed timber framing.	II
Lyddan House, 5 Dam Street; 52.68412°N 1.82781°W	—	Early to mid 18th century	A stuccoed brick house with a top cornice, and a tile roof with a coped gable. There are two storeys and an attic, a double-depth plan, and a symmetrical front of five bays. Steps with handrails on decorative brackets lead up to the central doorway has pilasters, a cornice on brackets, panelled reveals, and a recessed door with a fanlight. The windows are casements with segmental heads, there are three gabled hip roofed dormers, and at the rear are three gables.	II
The Scales Public House, 24 Market Street; 52.68316°N 1.82850°W		Early to mid 18th century	The public house is stuccoed, and has two bands, and a tile roof. There are two storeys, five bays, and rear gabled wings. In the ground floor is a carriage entry to the left, there are two doorways with pilasters, and the doorways and windows have cornices on consoles. The upper floor contains a triple sash window on the left and casement windows to the right.	II
24 and 26 Bore Street; 52.68275°N 1.82768°W	—	c. 1740	Two houses, later offices, they are in brick with stucco dressings, on a plinth, with a sill band, a modillion cornice, and a tile roof. They are in Georgian style, and have two storeys and an attic, a double-depth plan, and seven bays. The doorways have panelled pilaster strips, fanlights, friezes, and cornices, and to the left is a carriage entrance. The windows are sashes, there is a blind window in the upper floor, and there are flat-roofed dormers.	II
Marlborough House, 26 St John Street; 52.68119°N 1.82839°W	—	c. 1740	A house, later an office, that was extended to the rear in the 18th century, and to the left in the 20th century, it is in brick with plaster dressings, on a plinth, with a top cornice, and hipped tile roofs. It is in early Georgian style, and has two storeys, an attic and basement, and a symmetrical front of five bays. The central porch has paired Tuscan columns, a frieze, a cornice, and a blocking course, and the doorway has an architrave and a fanlight. The basement windows are casements with segmental heads, and the other windows are sashes with arched lintels and keystones, and there are five hipped dormers.	II
9 and 11 Bird Street; 52.68254°N 1.82985°W	—	c. 1750	A pair of houses, later shops, in brick with a top frieze, a modillion cornice, and a tile roof with coped gables. The building is in Georgian style, and has two storeys and an attic, six bays, and three rear gabled wings. In the centre is a doorway with a fanlight, and this is flanked by 20th-century shop fronts. The upper floor contains sash windows, and there are three flat-roofed dormers.	II
7 Market Street; 52.68286°N 1.82937°W	—	c. 1750	A shop and office in brick with bands, a cornice, and a tile roof. It is in Georgian style, and has two storeys and an attic, and four bays. In the ground floor is a 20th-century shop front, the upper floor contains sash windows with iron window box holders, and there are two hip roofed dormers.	II
1, 3 and 5 Tamworth Street; 52.68369°N 1.82644°W	—	c. 1750	A pair of shops that were extended to the left in about 1850. They are in brick with dressings in stone and stucco, and have a roof partly tiled and partly slated. The shops are in Georgian style, and have three storeys, and shop fronts in the ground floor. Nos. 3 and 5 have four bays, a band and a top cornice. The windows are sashes with keystones, and in the middle floor they have sills on brackets. No. 1 is on a corner, and has one bay on each front, and a curved bay between, bands, a top frieze, and a modillion cornice. On the corner the windows are curved, and in the fronts the windows in the middle floor are three-light sashes, and in the top floor they are two-light windows with round-headed lights.	II
Angel Croft Hotel, outbuilding, railings and gates, Beacon Street; 52.68503°N 1.83326°W		c. 1750	The hotel is in red brick on a plinth, with stone dressings, sill bands, a cornice and blocking course, and a hipped slate roof. It is in Georgian style, and has three storeys and a symmetrical front of five bays. The central round-headed doorway has Doric columns, a fanlight, and a Tuscan entablature with a fluted frieze and a pediment, and the windows are sashes. At the rear are two full-height canted bay windows, between which is a round-headed stair window. Attached to the right is an outbuilding with a ramped cornice and sash windows. A stone-coped brick wall connects this to railings with fleur-de-lys finials, gates with gate piers and an overthrow with two lantern holders.	II*
Moat House, wall and outbuilding, Bird Street; 52.68450°N 1.83234°W	—	c. 1750	A house, later offices, in brick with stone dressings, a top cornice, and a hipped tile roof. It is in Georgian style, and has two storeys and an attic, an L-shaped plan, a front of four bays, and a recessed wing on the left. The doorway has a segmental head, an architrave, a radial fanlight, and a pediment on consoles. The windows are sashes with keystones, and there are two hipped dormers. At the rear is a small gabled outbuilding with a canted bay window, and to the left is a stone-coped wall containing a segmental-headed doorway.	II
Samuel's Public House, 4 Market Street; 52.68263°N 1.82941°W	—	c. 1750	The public house is in painted brick with a band, a tile roof, two storeys, three bays, and a 20th-century rear wing. The ground floor contains a pub front with a doorway to the left, two plate glass windows, and a sash window to the right, panels under the windows, pilasters at the ends and between the windows with entablature blocks on consoles, and over all is a frieze and a cornice. The upper floor contains sash windows.	II
Westgate House, outbuildings, walls, gates and railings, Beacon Street; 52.68459°N 1.83289°W	—	c. 1750	A house in stuccoed brick with a top cornice and parapet, and a roof, slated at the front and tiled at the rear, with coped gables. It is in Georgian style, with a double-depth plan, three storeys, a symmetrical front of five bays, and two rear wings. The central doorway has Doric antae, a radial fanlight, and an entablature with triglyphs, and the windows are sashes. At the rear is a round-headed stair window, and an outbuilding with coped gables. The front garden has brick side walls with stone entablatures, and low stone walls at the front with iron railings. In the centre are elaborate wrought iron gate piers, gates, and an overthrow.	II
6 and 8 Bird Street and 2 Market Street; 52.68251°N 1.82956°W	—	Mid 18th century	Two shops on a corner site, in brick with stucco dressings, a tile roof, and in Georgian style. There are three storeys, four bays, a later bay to the left on Bird Street, and three bays on Market Street, with the ground floor stuccoed. The original four bays on Bird Street have a band and a parapet, and in the upper floors are sash windows with rusticated lintels and keystones. The later range has sash windows in plain surrounds on both fronts. In the ground floor on Bird Street is a round-headed entrance to the right, and on both fronts are shop fronts with windows that have cornices and open pediments.	II
7 Dam Street; 52.68423°N 1.82796°W	—	18th century	A brick shop with a stuccoed front, a modillioned and cogged cornice, and a tile roof. There are two storeys and an attic, two bays, and a rear gabled wing. In the ground floor are a doorway with a fanlight, and to the right is a shop window with pilasters, a frieze, and a cornice. The upper floor contains casement windows, and there are two gabled dormers.	II
1 and 3 Greenhill; 52.68390°N 1.82309°W	—	Mid 18th century	A pair of houses on a corner site, later used for other purposes, they are in brick with a modillion cornice, and a tile roof, hipped to the left. There are three storeys, an L-shaped plan, a front of two bays, and a rear gabled wing. No. 1 has a doorway with a segmental head, a shop window with a cornice to the left, and above are casement windows, the window in the middle floor with a segmental head. The doorway of No. 3 has pilasters, a frieze, and a cornice, and the windows are small-paned casements.	II
17 Greenhill; 52.68385°N 1.82251°W	—	18th century	The house, which is in red brick, contains some earlier timber framing, and has a modillioned parapeted gable, and a tile roof. There are two storeys and an attic, a right-angle plan, and a front of two bays. The doorway and the windows, which are casements, have segmental heads, and above the windows are bands in blue brick.	II
19 and 21 Greenhill; 52.68387°N 1.82241°W	—	18th century	A pair of houses in brick with some timber framing, a band, a modillion cornice, and a tile roof. There are two storeys, three bays, and two rear wings, one with a hipped roof, and the other smaller and timber framed with brick infill. The doorways have segmental heads, and the windows, which are casements, also have segmental heads, apart from two windows in the upper floor.	II
1, 3, 5 and 7 Lombard Street; 52.68417°N 1.82524°W	—	18th century	A row of shops and part of a restaurant, they are in brick with a timber framed core, and have tile roofs. There are two storeys and two ranges, each of two bays. The left range has a top moulded cornice, in the ground floor are two shop fronts, the left with a recessed entrance and a canopy, and the right with a cornice and fascia. The upper floor contains a casement window and a sash window. The right range has two canted oriel windows in the ground floor, and in the upper floor are two gabled half-dormers containing small-paned casement windows.	II
14A Lombard Street, wall and pump 52.68460°N 1.82443°W	—	18th century (probable)	A stuccoed house with a tile roof, one storey and an attic, and three bays. The central doorway has a segmental head, and the windows are casements, those in the attic in gabled dormers. There is a pump attached to the garden wall.	II
57 and 59 Tamworth Street; 52.68403°N 1.82392°W	—	Mid 18th century	Two houses, later shops, that were refronted in the 19th century. They are in brick, stuccoed at the front, with a band, and a tile roof. There are two storeys and an attic, a double-depth plan, a front of two bays, and at the rear are two gabled wings, a two-storey range, and a single-storey lean-to. In the ground floor are 20th-century shop fronts, the upper floor contains sash windows, and there are two gabled dormers.	II
8 The Close; 52.68510°N 1.83190°W	—	18th century (possible)	The house was refronted in about 1860. It is in brick with stone dressings on a plaster plinth, with a brick pilaster on the left, and a tile roof. There are three storeys, a right angle plan, two gabled bays, and a rear two-storey lean-to. The doorway on the right has a segmental head, moulded reveals, and a gabled porch. To the left is a two-storey canted bay window with a cornice, and the other windows are casements with segmental heads, the window in the middle floor of the right bay being tripartite with colonettes that have foliate capitals. All the gables have decorative bargeboards and pendants.	II
Beacon Lodge, wall and railings 67 Beacon Street; 52.68713°N 1.83570°W	—	18th century	The house was altered in the 19th century and extensively restored in about 1980. It is in painted brick with a modillion cornice and a tile roof. There is one storey and an attic, an L-shaped plan, and two bays. On the front are three-light casement windows and three-light raking dormers. The left gable end has bargeboards, and contains a canted bay window with a hipped roof, and above is a projecting casement window on brackets. Attached to the front is a short brick wall with a stone pier, and a low stone quadrant wall with iron railings.	II
Duke of York Public House, Greenhill; 52.68390°N 1.82214°W		18th century	The public house contains earlier timber framing, and has incorporated a house. It is in stuccoed brick, and has a tile roof, two storeys, the original public house has three bays, and the former house on the left has two. The doorway has a plain surround and a fanlight, and the windows are casements. Behind the public house are two gabled wings with later infill, and there is a wing behind the house. Inside the public house is a timber-framed cross-wall.	II
Pool House and former stable, 30 Dam Street; 52.68490°N 1.82856°W	—	Mid 18th century	The house is in brick on a plinth, with sill bands, a top cornice, and a hipped tile roof. It is in Georgian style, with a double-depth plan, three storeys, and four bays. The round-headed doorway has pilasters, a fanlight, an entablature, and a pediment, and the windows are sashes. In the left return is a round-headed stair window, and at the rear are a hipped wing and other later extensions. The former stable block has a modillion cornice and segmental openings, including former pitching holes.	II
St Chad's School House, 12 The Close; 52.68547°N 1.83216°W	—	18th century	A house, later a school, it was remodelled and extended in the 19th century. It is in brick with a modillion band and a tile roof. There are three storeys, a U-shaped plan, and a front of seven bays. The outer two bays on each side project as wings and have half-hipped roofs. To the left of the right wing is a tower with a cogged cornice and a pyramidal roof with a finial. The doorway is in the tower and has a Tudor arched head, and above it is a statue with a canopy. The gables have plain bargeboards and finials, and the windows are sashes.	II
Stafford Road Pinfold; 52.69006°N 1.84456°W	—	18th century	The pinfold, which has an earlier origin, was restored in 1990. It is in brick, it has a square plan and contains a 20th-century gate. Steps lead down into the interior, which was paved in 1990. There is a plaque in the rear wall.	II
Stowe Hill, Auchinlech Drive; 52.69071°N 1.81861°W	—	Mid 18th century	A house in brick with stone dressings, quoins, a top frieze, and a hipped tile roof. It is in early Georgian style, and has two storeys, a front of five bays, and a single-storey service wing to the right. On the front is a Tuscan porch with a frieze and a cornice. To the left is a canted bay window, and the other windows are sashes. On the left side is a bow-fronted conservatory, and on the garden front is a full-height bow window that has a balustrade with a parapet and urns.	II*
Westgate Cottage, 1 Beacon Street; 52.68466°N 1.83306°W	—	18th century	The house is in painted brick with a stuccoed front, a top cornice, and a hipped tile roof. It is in Tudor style, and has two storeys, and right angle plan consisting of a main range and a short rear wing. Most of the windows are triple sashes with pointed heads, chamfered surrounds, and hood moulds, there are some casement windows, and at the front is a later projection containing two bay windows.	II
Darwin House, Beacon Street; 52.68499°N 1.83264°W		c. 1758	The house was converted from an earlier house for Erasmus Darwin. It is in red brick with stuccoed dressings, sill bands, a modillion cornice, a coped parapet containing two balustrades panels, and a tile roof. The house is in Georgian style, it has two storeys and a basement, and a symmetrical front of three bays, the middle bay projecting under a pediment. The central round-headed doorway has a Tuscan surround, and in the outer bays are Venetian windows containing sashes. The window above the doorway has an architrave with a triple keystone, and at the rear is a round-headed stair window.	I
7, 9 and 9A Tamworth Street; 52.68378°N 1.82628°W	—	c. 1760	A pair of houses, later shops, in brick with stone dressings, a band, a top cornice, and a tile roof with a coped gable. They are in Georgian style, with three storeys, a double-depth plan and two bays. In the ground floor are 19th-century shop fronts. The left shop front has a recessed doorway, a bracketed cornice, and cast iron cresting, and to the right the shop front has panelled pilasters, and a bracketed cornice with ball finials. In the middle floor are sash windows with wedge lintels and keystones, flanked by single-light windows. In the top floor the windows are casements, again flanked by single-light windows.	II
40 Tamworth Street; 52.68391°N 1.82462°W	—	c. 1760	A house and a shop in painted brick with a tile roof. There are three storeys and two bays. In the ground floor is a small shop window on the left with a recessed entrance and a fluted frieze. To the right is a doorway with moulded pilaster strips, a frieze, and a cornice. Above the ground floor is a canopy on decorative brackets that has a fascia with pendants, and a cornice with cast iron cresting. The windows are casements, in the middle floor with segmental heads.	II
Stowe Gate House, 37 and 39 Lombard Street; 52.68535°N 1.82397°W	—	c. 1760	A pair of houses, later an office, in brick with stone dressings, on a stone plinth, with sill bands, a top cornice, a coped parapet, and a roof partly tiled and partly slated. It is in Georgian style, and has five bays, and two rear wings. In the centre is a doorway with panelled pilaster strips, a fanlight, an entablature, and a pediment on consoles. In the first bay is a doorway with incised pilasters, a frieze with rosettes, a cornice and a blind fanlight, and in the fifth bay is a doorway with panelled pilaster strips, a fanlight, a frieze, and a pediment. The second bay contains a shop window in the ground floor, and the other windows are sashes, the windows in the middle bay have architraves.	II
31 and 33 Bore Street; 52.68295°N 1.82771°W	—	Mid to late 18th century	A shop in painted brick with a band, a top moulded cornice, and a tile roof. There are three storeys, three bays, and a rear gabled wing. In the ground floor is a 20th-century shop front, and a round-headed entry with a tympanum to the right. In the middle floor are sash windows, and the windows in the top floor are casements.	II
16 and 18 Conduit Street; 52.68394°N 1.82704°W	—	Mid to late 18th century	A pair of shops in brick with stone dressings and tile roofs. They are in Georgian style, and have three storeys, and one bay each. The shop on the left protrudes slightly under a hipped roof, the shop front has glazed tiles on pilasters, a cornice supported by carved bulls' heads, and decorative iron cresting. In the upper floors are three-light sashes with segmental heads, and at the top is a timber parapet. The right shop has sash windows with wedge lintels and keystones, and at the top is a cornice and a stone-coped brick parapet.	II
16 Dam Street; 52.68450°N 1.82811°W	—	Mid to late 18th century	A brick house with bands, a modillion cornice, and a tile roof. There are three storeys and two bays. The doorway has a segmental head and a fanlight, and to the left is a canted bay window that has a frieze with Tudor roses and sash windows. The middle floor contains two canted oriel windows on brackets carved with grotesques. They contain casement windows, under which are panels with plaster reliefs, and in the top floor are casement windows.	II
23 Dam Street; 52.68456°N 1.82842°W	—	Mid to late 18th century	A painted brick house with a band, a modillion cornice, and a tile roof. There are two storeys and an attic, an L-shaped plan, two bays, and a gabled rear wing. The doorways have pilasters with decorative heads, between them is a sash window, and above them is a continuous frieze and a hood mould. The upper floor contains casement windows with segmental heads, and there are two gabled dormers.	II
30 and 32 Market Street; 52.68330°N 1.82822°W	—	Mid to late 18th century	A pair of stuccoed shops with a top band and a tile roof. There are two storeys, four bays, and rear gabled wings. In the ground floor are 20th-century shop fronts, and the upper floor contains sash windows.	II
34 and 36 Market Street; 52.68340°N 1.82808°W	—	Mid to late 18th century	An office in stuccoed brick, with bands, a plain parapet, and a double-span tile roof. It is in Georgian style, and has three storeys, and four bays. In the ground floor is an office front, the upper floors contain sash windows, and at the rear the windows are casements.	II
35 and 37 Market Street; 52.68358°N 1.82809°W	—	Mid to late 18th century	A shop and office, stuccoed, with bands, a top cornice, and a tile roof. There are three storeys, four bays, and at the rear are two gabled wings and a later extension. In the ground floor is a 20th-century shop front, and a doorway to the left, and the upper floors contain sash windows.	II
51, 53 and 55 Tamworth Street; 52.68402°N 1.82409°W	—	Mid to late 18th century	A house, later a shop, it is stuccoed, with a tile roof, two storeys and an attic, and three bays. To the left is a carriage entrance with a cambered head, there are two doorways, each with a cornice on decorated consoles, and between them are two shop windows. The upper floor contains sash windows, and there are three gabled dormers.	II
King's Head Public House, 21 Bird Street; 52.68295°N 1.83053°W		Mid to late 18th century	A coaching inn, later a public house, it is in brick with a top cornice and a tile roof, hipped to the right. The building is in Georgian style, and has three storeys, and an L-shaped plan, with a front of three bays. In the right bay is a carriage entrance with a rusticated wedge lintel, to the left are two tripartite windows with segmental heads, and an inscribed plaque between them. The upper floors contain sash windows. Inside, there is some exposed timber framing.	II
St John's House and wall, 28 St John Street; 52.68095°N 1.82818°W		Mid to late 18th century	The house, at one time a school, was refronted in about 1820. It is in Greek Revival style, it is in stuccoed brick with stone dressings, and has a top cornice, a blocking course, a panelled parapet, and a tile roof. There are three storeys and four bays, the left bay slightly recessed. To the left is a single-storey wing with a hipped roof, and at the rear is a single-storey service wing, and a full-height wing with a canted bay window. The ground floor is recessed and has fluted Composite columns, over which is a frieze with wreaths. Steps lead up to the doorway in the third bay, which has an architrave and a fanlight. In the ground floor are triple sash windows, and the upper floors contain sash windows, those in the middle floor with architraves, friezes, and pediments. From the right side, a garden wall extends to the rear.	II*
Dimble House, Beacon Street; 52.68535°N 1.83316°W		c. 1770	A brick house with stone dressings, a top frieze, cornice and parapet, and a hipped slate roof. There are three storeys, and an L-shaped plan, with a symmetrical front of three bays, and two rear wings. The central doorway has an architrave, a frieze, and a cornice. In the lower two floors are sash windows with rusticated lintels and the top floor contains casement windows with plain lintels.	II
Garrick House, 2 Queen Street; 52.68186°N 1.83219°W	—	c. 1770	A house on a corner site, which was altered in 1832, it is in brick with stone dressings, end pilasters, a top cornice and blocking course, and a parapeted roof. It is in Georgian style, with a double-depth plan, three storeys, and sides of three bays. The round-headed doorway has fluted pilasters, a radial fanlight, a Doric frieze, and a pediment. The windows are sashes, those in the right return with keystones.	II
Langton House, Bird Street; 52.68440°N 1.83224°W	—	c. 1775	A house, later offices, in brick with stone dressings, a top cornice, and a hipped tile roof. It is in Georgian style, with a double-depth plan, three storeys, four bays, and a single-storey right wing. The segmental-headed doorway has an architrave, a radial fanlight, and a pediment on consoles, and the windows are sashes.	II
17 Bore Street; 52.68265°N 1.82827°W	—	Late 18th century	A stuccoed office with a top cornice and a tile roof. There are three storeys and two bays. In the ground floor is a 20th-century shop front, the middle floor contains sash windows, and in the top floor are casement windows.	II
27 Bore Street; 52.68289°N 1.82791°W	—	Late 18th century	The shop is in painted brick on an earlier timber framed core, and has a tile roof, and a coped gable facing the street. In the ground floor is a 20th-century shop front, the upper floors contain casement windows with segmental heads, and inside there is exposed timber framing with wattle and daub infill.	II
29 Bore Street; 52.68292°N 1.82787°W	—	Late 18th century	A stuccoed shop with an earlier timber framed core, and a later rear wing. It has a floor band, a parapet, and a hipped tile roof. There are three storeys and one bay. In the ground floor is a 20th-century shop front, the middle floor contains a casement window, and in the top floor is a horizontally-sliding sash window. Inside there is exposed timber framing.	II
36 Bore Street; 52.68319°N 1.82695°W	—	Late 18th century	A house, later a shop, in brick with a band and a hipped tile roof. There are three storeys, a right angle plan, and one bay. In the ground floor is a 20th-century shop front recessed behind a concrete beam on brick piers, and the upper floors contain tripartite sash windows.	II
10, 10A and 10B Dam Street; 52.68436°N 1.82795°W	—	Late 18th century	A pair of houses, later shops, in brick, with a modillion cornice, a tile roof, two storeys, and two bays. In the ground floor are two doorways and two windows, all with segmental heads. The upper floor contains small-paned casement windows, and in the right return are two segmental-headed windows.	II
9 Sandford Street; 52.68240°N 1.83041°W	—	Late 18th century (probable)	A house, later a shop, in brick with earlier timber framing internally, on a plastered plinth, with a band, a top fascia, and a tile roof. There are three storeys, an L-shaped plan, and two bays. The doorway has a cornice, the windows are sashes in moulded frames, and there is a raking dormer containing a small-pane casement.	II
Earl of Lichfield Arms Public House, Conduit Street; 52.68380°N 1.82682°W	—	Late 18th century	The projecting right bay was rebuilt in the 20th century. The public house is in brick with stone dressings, a top cornice, and a tile roof. There are three storeys and two bays, the right bay projecting over an arcade, and rear wings. The entrance is in the right bay with a two-light fixed window to the left. In the left bay is a window with three round-headed lights, and a fascia with decorative consoles. The upper floors contain sash windows.	II
George Hotel, Bird Street; 52.68282°N 1.83002°W		Late 18th century	The hotel is in brick with a stucco front and a slate roof, it has a courtyard plan, and is in Georgian style. The central range has two storeys and five bays, flanked by ranges with three storeys and three bays, and at the rear are two wings. The central range has a rusticated ground floor, and in the upper floor are Ionic pilasters, a frieze and a modillion cornice. In the middle is an entrance with an elliptical head, and the windows are sashes, those in the ground floor with wedge lintels. The outer ranges also contain sash windows, and at the left corner the ground floor has a canted angle.	II*
Minster House, Minster Pool Walk; 52.68370°N 1.83078°W	—	Late 18th century	A house, later used for other purposes, it is in brick, partly stuccoed, with a top frieze, cornice, and blocking course, and a hipped slate roof. The building is in Georgian style, and has a double-depth plan, three storeys and a basement, a front facing the road of two bays, and a single-storey rear wing with a tile roof. The doorway has a fanlight and a canopy om brackets. In the basement are small-paned casement windows with hood moulds, the lower two floors contain Venetian windows and sash windows, and in the top floor are tripartite sash windows.	II
Old Windmill House, Grange Lane; 52.69249°N 1.84006°W	—	Late 18th century	A windmill to which a house was attached in 1905. The windmill is in brick with stone dressings, and consists of a conical tower with four storeys, surmounted by merlons, and in each floor is a window. The house is also in stone.	II
19, 19A and 21 Bore Street; 52.68276°N 1.82813°W	—	c. 1780	A house, later an office, in brick, with a sill band, a top cornice and blocking course, and a tile roof with coped gables. There are three storeys and four bays. The central doorway has an architrave, a fanlight, and a bracketed open pediment, and to the left is a smaller round-headed doorway with imposts. To the left the ground floor is plastered, and contains a shop front and two doorways, one with a round head, and to the right is a 20th-century shop front with panelled pilaster strips and a bracketed cornice. In the upper floors are sash windows.	II
35 Lombard Street; 52.68524°N 1.82415°W	—	c. 1780	A house, later an office, it is in brick with stone dressings, on a stone plinth, with sills bands, a top cornice, and a hipped tile roof. It is in Georgian style, and has three storeys, a double-depth plan, and three bays. The round-headed doorway has pilasters, a fanlight, an entablature, and a pediment. There is a smaller segmental-headed doorway to the right, and the windows are sashes.	II
3 Market Street; 52.68275°N 1.82953°W	—	c. 1780	A shop in brick with a band, a parapet, and a roof with coped gables. It is in Georgian style, with three storeys, a double-depth plan, and three bays. In the ground floor is a shop front with bow windows flanking the doorway that has panelled pilaster strips, a fanlight, and an entablature on consoles, and to the right is a carriage entrance with an elliptical arch. The upper floors contain sash windows, and there is a wrought iron sign bracket.	II
15 and 17 Market Street; 52.68310°N 1.82902°W	—	c. 1780	Shops, offices and living accommodation in brick with stone dressings, a sill band, and a top cornice. The building is in Georgian style, with three storeys, a front of seven bays, and rear wings. In the ground floor are three round-headed doorways with pilasters, fanlights, entablature blocks, and open pediments, two bow windows with pilasters and entablatures, and a shop window. The upper floors contain sash windows with rusticated lintels and keystones. Over the middle doorway is a decorative iron bracket and a lantern.	II
15 Sandford Street; 52.68230°N 1.83065°W	—	c. 1780	A pair of houses, later offices, the right range added in about 1908. The ranges are in brick with stone dressings, on a plinth, with a top cornice, and tile roofs. Both are in Georgian style, with a double-depth plan, and three storeys. The left range has three bays, a central doorway with an architrave, a fanlight, a frieze, and a bracketed pediment, and to the left is a round-headed entrance with a fanlight. The windows are sashes with sills, the sills in the ground floor bracketed. The right range has two bands, a modillion cornice, and two bays. The doorway to the left has a fanlight and a segmental head, and the windows are top-hung casements, those in the lower two floors with segmental heads. At the rear are two gabled wings with parapeted infill.	II
Selwyn House, The Close; 52.68590°N 1.82900°W		c. 1780	The house was enlarged in the 19th century, and has been divided into flats. It is in brick, partly painted, with a sill band, a top cornice and blocking course, and a hipped slate roof. It is in Georgian style, and has three storeys and a basement, and a symmetrical front of five bays, the central bay canted. The central doorway has a round head, pilasters, entablature blocks, a pediment, and a fanlight with a fluted frieze. The windows are sashes with keystones. enclosing the basement area are iron railings.	II
Conduit, northwest corner of The Close; 52.68532°N 1.83187°W	—	1786	The former conduit head and pump are in stone, and are enclosed in square casing, which has a band, a round niche on each face, and a domed cap. There is a slit for a handle on the west side, and a spout to the north.	II
8 Bore Street; 52.68231°N 1.82859°W	—	c. 1790	A house, later used for other purposes, it is in brick with stone dressings, on a plinth, with a top cornice, a blocking course, and a parapet, and a roof with coped gables. The building is in Georgian style, with three storeys, a double-depth plan, a symmetrical front of three bays, and a rear lean-to. The central doorway has an architrave. panelled pilasters, a segmental fanlight with radial glazing bars, and a cornice on consoles, and is flanked by inset boot scrapers. The windows are sashes.	II
10 Bore Street; 52.68234°N 1.82847°W	—	c. 1790	A house, later an office, in brick with stone dressings, on a plinth, with a top cornice, and a slate roof. It is in Georgian style, with four storeys, a double-depth plan, and two bays. The doorway has an architrave, panelled pilasters, a fanlight, and a cornice on consoles, and to the right is an inset boot scraper. The windows are sashes, the ground floor window is tripartite with a segmental head and a tympanum. At the rear is a modillion cornice, and casement windows.	II
20–22 Bird Street; 52.68306°N 1.83033°W	—	c. 1800	A shop, later a restaurant, incorporating earlier material, it is in brick with stone dressings, a sill band, a top cornice, and a tile roof. The building is in Georgian style, and has three storeys, an L-shaped plan, a symmetrical front of three bays, and two rear wings. In the ground floor is an early 19th-century shop front with panelled pilaster strips, an entablature. bow windows, and a recessed doorway. The upper floors contain sash windows, and in the middle floor is a wrought iron bracket. Inside, there is timber framing.	II
27 Bird Street; 52.68314°N 1.83072°W	—	c. 1800	A brick shop with a modillion cornice and a hipped tile roof, three storeys and one bay. In the ground floor is a 19th-century shop front with a central round-headed doorway flanked by two round-headed windows on each side, with colonettes, fluted pilaster strips, and a bracketed fascia, over which are three scrolled lamp brackets. The middle floor contains a sash window, and in the top floor is a three-light casement window, both with segmental heads.	II
32 and 34 Bird Street; 52.68332°N 1.83070°W	—	c. 1800	A pair of shops with stucco dressings, a top frieze, cornice and parapet, and a tile roof. It is in Georgian style, and has three storeys, three bays and two gabled rear wings. In the ground floor is a 20th-century shop front, there are two casement windows in the top floor, and the other windows are sashes. On the left gable end is a mosaic of Dr. Johnson.	II
2, 3 and 4 Dam Street; 52.68414°N 1.82752°W	—	c. 1800	A row of shops in brick with stone dressings, a top cornice and a blocking course, and a tile roof. They are in Georgian style, and have three storeys and seven bays, the middle three bays projecting under a pediment. In the ground floor are late 19th-century shop fronts, and the upper floors contain sash windows.	II
2 Gaia Lane; 52.68592°N 1.83353°W	—	c. 1800	A brick house on a corner site with a modillion cornice, and a hipped slate roof. It is in Georgian style, and has three storeys. The doorway is in the centre and there are sash windows to the left of the doorway, and in the right return.	II
14 Lombard Street, wall and railings 52.68450°N 1.82451°W	—	c. 1800	A stuccoed house with stone dressings, a top cornice, and a tile roof. It is in Georgian style, and has two storeys and an attic, and a symmetrical front of three bays. The central doorway has panelled pilasters, a frieze, a cornice, and a wrought iron balcony. The windows are sashes, and there are three gabled dormers with plain bargeboards and horizontally-sliding sash windows. In the garden are brick walls and decorative wrought iron railings.	II
29 Market Street; 52.68342°N 1.82836°W	—	c. 1800	A shop with fronts added in about 1990, it is in brick with a sill band, a top cornice, and a parapet. The shop is in Georgian style, and has three storeys, three bays, and a rear wing. In the upper floors are sash windows.	II
1–9A Newton's College and gate pier, The Close; 52.68481°N 1.83208°W		1800	A row of almshouses in brick, with dressings and the front faced in stone, on a plinth, with a band, a top frieze and cornice, end pilaster strips, and a slate roof. It is in Classical style, with a double-depth plan, two storeys and 14 bays (originally 17 bays). The former central three bays project under a pediment, and the ground floor is rusticated. In the centre is a round-headed doorway with a fanlight and a cast iron overthrow with a lantern, and it is flanked by round-headed sash windows in round-headed recesses. The other windows are sashes, and above the doorway is a round-headed niche. At the rear is a gate pier by the entrance.	II*
10 Newton's College, The Close; 52.68461°N 1.83243°W	—	1800–05	An almshouse in brick, with dressings and the front faced in stone, on a plinth, with a band, end pilaster strips, a top cornice and frieze, and a slate roof. It is in Classical style, with a double-depth plan, three storeys, and two bays facing Bird Street. The windows are sashes, those in the middle floor in round-headed recesses. The left part of the left return is recessed and contains an arcade with a parapet.	II
28 Sandford Street; 52.68217°N 1.83136°W	—	c. 1800	A house, later an office, incorporating earlier material, and extensively extended in the 20th century. It is in brick with some timber framing, a top frieze and cornice, and a parapeted roof. There are two storeys, three bays, and a recessed bay to the left. In the ground floor are two doorways with radial fanlights, and two bow windows with friezes. The upper floor contains sash windows with segmental heads, one with an architrave, and two with pilasters, friezes and cornices. On the sides is exposed timber framing.	II
9 and 11 St John Street; 52.68187°N 1.82872°W	—	c. 1800	A pair of shops with a top cornice, a tile roof, three storeys, three bays, and a rear gabled wing. No. 9 has a 19th-century shop front with a cornice on consoles, No. 11 has a 20th-century shop front with a recessed entrance, and between them is a round-headed entry. In the upper floors are casement windows, those in the middle floor with segmental heads.	II
29 and 31 Tamworth Street; 52.68407°N 1.82539°W	—	c. 1800	A pair of houses, later shops, in brick, with a cornice that has egg and dart moulding, and a tile roof with coped gable and kneelers. The building is in Georgian style, with three storeys, a double-depth plan, and three bays. The main doorway is round-headed with panelled pilasters, a fanlight, a frieze, and a cornice, and there are two smaller doorways with segmental heads. In the ground floor the windows are small-paned and fixed, the middle floor has sash windows in the outer bays and a casement window in the central bay, and the top floor contains small-paned casements; all the windows have segmental heads.	II
19, 19A and 19B The Close; 52.68534°N 1.82973°W	—	1800	The house was extended in the 19th century, and is used for other purposes. It is in brick with a modillion cornice, and a roof of tile and slate. It is in Georgian style, with a double-depth plan, two storeys and a rear basement, a front of five bays, and a lower three-storey, three-bay extension recessed on the left. The central doorway is approached by steps with railings, and has an elliptical fanlight and a cornice on consoles, and to the right is a smaller doorway. To the right of the main doorway is an iron bracket, and the windows are sashes.	II
Borrowcrop Pavilion; 52.67519°N 1.81819°W		c. 1800	The pavilion, or gazebo, on a viewpoint, is in brick with a cornice, and a pyramidal tile roof with a ball finial. It has a square plan with two round arches on each side. Each arch has square piers, pilasters and narrow imposts. Inside is a spine wall with benches, and the flooring is in embossed tiles.	II
Old College House, 34 Dam Street; 52.68510°N 1.82877°W	—	c. 1800	A brick house, later converted into flats, it is in Georgian style, and has a top frieze and a hipped tile roof. There is a double-depth plan, three storeys, and a symmetrical front of three bays. The central doorway has pilasters, a fanlight, a bracketed hood, and side lights. The windows on the front are sashes, and at the rear they are casements.	II
Three Spires House, 16A Bird Street; 52.68301°N 1.83027°W	—	c. 1800	A shop in brick, the front painted, with stone dressings, a band, a top cornice, and a hipped tile roof. It is in Georgian style, with three storeys, an L-shaped plan, two bays, and a later gabled rear wing. The shop has an early 20th-century shop front with panelled pilaster strips and a bracketed cornice, and an elliptical arch with a fretted head on Composite columns. The upper floors contain sash windows.	II
25 Bird Street; 52.68309°N 1.83072°W	—	Late 18th to early 19th century	A brick shop with a top cornice and a tile roof. It is in Georgian style, and has three storeys and two bays. In the ground floor is a 19th-century shop front with a panelled fascia on consoles and a recessed entrance, and to the left is a doorway with a fanlight and a chamfered lintel. The upper floors contain sash windows, and between the top floors are wooden panels with decorative lettering.	II
Former conduit, 15 The Close; 52.68559°N 1.83161°W	—	1803	The former conduit is a brick structure with a pyramidal slate roof and a finial. It has a single-storey and an octagonal plan, and an extension to the garden wall. There is a round-headed entrance, a canted oriel window, and a casement window.	II
1 Whitehall; 52.68567°N 1.83363°W	—	c. 1806	A public house, later a private house, it was refronted in about 1830. The house is in brick with a stuccoed front, on a plinth, with a sill band, a top cornice, and a hipped tile roof. It is in Georgian style, and has three storeys and four bays. The doorway to the right has a fanlight and a cornice on consoles, and to the left is a segmental-headed carriage entrance with a rusticated arch, a vermiculated keystone, and a tympanum. The windows are sashes with cornices on consoles.	II
20 Beacon Street; 52.68585°N 1.83350°W	—	c. 1810	A brick house with stone dressings on a stone plinth, with a top cornice, fluted modillions, and a hipped slate roof. There are three storeys, a double-depth plan, and a symmetrical front of three bays. The central doorway has fluted Ionic pilasters, a fanlight, and an entablature. The middle windows in the upper floors have architraves, the windows in the lower two floors are sashes, in the top floor they are casements, and there is a tall stair window in the right return.	II
32 Beacon Street; 52.68628°N 1.83399°W	—	c. 1810	A brick house, partly painted, with a band, a modillion cornice, and a tile roof. There are three storeys and two bays. The doorway to the right has a segmental head and panelled pilaster strips. The windows in the lower two floors have segmental heads, in the ground floor the window is a casement, and the upper floor contain sash windows.	II
50 Beacon Street; 52.68680°N 1.83466°W	—	c. 1810	A pair of houses in stone, the left bay stuccoed, on a plinth. with a sill band, a top cornice, and a slate roof. They are in Georgian style, with a double-depth plan, three storeys, a front of three bays with an additional bay to the left, and a rear wing. The right doorway has moulded pilasters, a fanlight, and an open pediment on brackets, and the left doorway has an architrave, a frieze, and a cornice on consoles; both are approached by steps. The windows are sashes.	II
10 Bird Street and 1 and 1A Market Street; 52.68262°N 1.82972°W	—	c. 1810	Two shops and an office on a corner site, in brick with stone dressings, quoins, and a tile roof. They are in Georgian style, and have three storeys, an L-shaped plan, with four bays on Market Street, and two on Bird Street. In the ground floor are shop fronts, the shop front in Market Street has panelled pilasters, and a fascia on decorative brackets. In the upper floors are sash windows.	II
26 Bird Street; 52.68318°N 1.83050°W	—	c. 1810	A shop with plastered dressings, a plain parapet, three storeys, and three bays, in Georgian style. In the ground floor is a late 19th-century shop front that has a recessed central entrance with a blind tympanum, and windows that have three round-headed lights and decorative spandrels. To the left is a doorway with a fanlight, and over all is a cornice on consoles. The upper floors contain sash windows with wedge lintels and keystones.	II
16 Bore Street; 52.68253°N 1.82814°W	—	c. 1810	A house, later an office, it is stuccoed with stone dressings, a top cornice, a blocking course, and a tile roof. It is in Georgian style, and has three storeys, an L-shaped plan, and three bays. The central doorway has an architrave, a pulvinated frieze, and a pediment, and there is a smaller doorway to the right. The windows are sashes.	II
18, 20 and 22 Bore Street; 52.68268°N 1.82785°W	—	c. 1810	Three houses, later an office and a shop, in brick with stone dressings, on a plinth, with a sill band, a top cornice, and a tile roof. They are in Georgian style, and have three storeys, a double-depth plan, seven bays, and a rear two-storey hip roofed wing. The three doorways have panelled pilaster strips, fanlights, friezes, and cornices, and there is a smaller doorway to an entry with a fanlight. The left shop window has pilasters and a moulded rusticated arch, and the other shop fronts have Corinthian pilasters, aprons, and entablatures. The windows are sashes.	II
23 Lombard Street; 52.68461°N 1.82480°W	—	c. 1810	A house, later offices, in brick with a modillion cornice and a tile roof. It is in Georgian style, and has three storeys, a double-depth plan, and two bays. The doorway to the right has panelled pilasters, a fanlight with decorative glazing, and a cornice on long brackets, and the windows are sashes.	II
Garden House, 6 Nether Beacon; 52.68841°N 1.83507°W	—	c. 1810	The garden house is in brick with stone dressings and a tile roof. It has a single storey with a basement, and a square plan. The south front is canted with a hipped roof, and the north gable is concave-sided, and has a weathervane. The entrances and windows have pointed heads. Inside, there is an octagonal room.	II
30, 32, 32A and 34 St John Street; 52.68072°N 1.82796°W	—	c. 1810	A terrace of three houses, later offices, in brick with stone dressings, on a plaster plinth, with a top cornice, a panelled parapet, and a tile roof with coped gables. They are in Georgian style, and have two storeys and eight bays. The doorways have fanlights, and the windows are sashes. At the rear is a gabled wing.	II
30 and 30A Tamworth Street; 52.68385°N 1.82529°W	—	c. 1810	A house, later a shop and office, in brick with stone dressings, a sill band, a top cornice, and a slate roof. It is in Georgian style, and has three storeys, a double-depth plan, and three bays. In the ground floor is a shop front, and the windows are sashes, those in the middle floor with bowed cast iron balconies.	II
Brooke House, 24 Dam Street; 52.68465°N 1.82826°W	—	c. 1810	A house, later an office, it is in brick with a cornice and a parapet. It is in Georgian style, and has three storeys and two bays. The doorway to the right has panelled pilasters, a blind fanlight, and a bracketed cornice. The windows are sashes with keystones, and above the doorway is an inscribed plaque.	II
Lombard Court, 21 Lombard Street; 52.68452°N 1.82486°W	—	c. 1810	A house, later offices, it is in brick with stone dressings, on a stone plinth, with sill bands, a modillioned cornice, and a tile roof. It is in Georgian style, and has three storeys, a double-depth plan, three bays, and a large 20th-century rear extension. The doorway has panelled pilasters, a fanlight with decorative glazing, entablature blocks, a pediment, and a fluted frieze. To the left is a doorway with an elliptical head, and the windows are sashes.	II
United Reformed Church, Wade Street; 52.68212°N 1.82710°W	—	1812	Originally a Congregational Church, it is in brick with stone dressings, on a plinth, with a top frieze, and a coped slate roof. The front has bands, two storeys, and a pediment containing a roundel. In the centre, three steps lead up to a round-headed doorway with an architrave, panelled reveals, and a fanlight. The windows have round heads, impost blocks, and small panes. Inside, there are galleries on three sides.	II
26 Beacon Street; 52.68609°N 1.83374°W	—	c. 1815	A toll house for the Bridge Commission, later a private house, it is in brick, the ground floor plastered, with a modillion cornice and a tile roof. There are three storeys and one bay. In the ground floor is a doorway in a round-headed recess with a tympanum, and to the right is a shop window with a cornice. The upper floors contain small-paned casement windows.	II
20 The Close; 52.68524°N 1.82995°W	—	1819 (or 1833)	The house is in brick with stone dressings on a stucco plinth, with a sill band, a top cornice and parapet, and a double-span tile roof. It is in Georgian style, and has three storeys, a double-depth plan, and five bays. In the centre are Tuscan columns, a frieze and a cornice, the entrance has a rusticated surround, and the doorway is recessed and approached by steps. To the left is a smaller doorway, and the windows are sashes. The centre at the rear projects under a pediment.	II
5 Beacon Street; 52.68531°N 1.83339°W	—	c. 1820	A house, later offices, to which a large rear wing was added in the 20th century. It is in brick with stone dressings, a band, a top cornice, a parapet, and a hipped roof. There are three storeys, and an L-shaped plan, consisting of a front block with a front of five bays, and a rear wing. The central segmental-headed doorway has an architrave, a fanlight with radial glazing bars, and a cornice on consoles. To the right is a canted bay window with an entablature and shaped lintels. The other windows are sashes, and to the right is a short wall containing a segmental-headed entrance.	II
30 Beacon Street; 52.68622°N 1.83389°W	—	c. 1820	The house is in plastered brick with a modillion cornice and a slate roof. There are three storeys and three bays. The central doorway has an architrave, a fanlight, and a gabled hood. In the lower two floors are sash windows, and the windows in the top floor are casements.	II
48 Beacon Street; 52.68675°N 1.83455°W	—	c. 1820	A stuccoed house on a plinth, with a sill band, a parapet, three storeys, and one bay. It is in Georgian style, and has a double-depth plan. Steps lead up to the entrance on the right, which is round-headed with an architrave and imposts, and the door is recessed. The windows are sashes.	II
54 and 56 Beacon Street; 52.68691°N 1.83482°W	—	c. 1820	A pair of houses in painted brick with stone dressings, on a plinth, with a top cornice parapet, and a tile roof. They are in Georgian style, and have a double-depth plan, two storeys, four bays, and a gabled rear wing. The doorways have architraves, friezes and cornices, there is a round-headed entry to the right, and the windows are sashes.	II
1 Bird Street; 52.68216°N 1.82947°W	—	c. 1820	A house, later used for other purposes, it is stuccoed, and has a parapet. The building is on a corner site, it is in Georgian style, and has three storeys and a rusticated ground floor. The front on Bird Street has six bays, with a pediment over the left three bays, and a single-storey wing on the right, and the front on The Friary has four bays. In the wing is an entrance with rusticated piers and an entablature. On the front on The Friary is a round-headed doorway with fluted imposts and a bracketed cornice. The windows are sashes, those in the middle floor on Bird Street with architraves, friezes, cornices, and balustraded aprons.	II
28 and 30 Bore Street; 52.68286°N 1.82755°W	—	c. 1820	A pair of houses, later offices, they are stuccoed, on a plinth, with an entablature over the top floor, a cornice over the attic, and a tile roof. There are two storeys and an attic, a symmetrical front of four bays, and rear hipped wings. The doorways at the ends have fanlights, shaped lintels and keystones, and there are narrow windows on the outer sides. The shop windows have gabled surrounds. In the upper floor and attic are sash windows with shaped lintels and keystones, and at the rear are dormers with cornices.	II
Cooper House, 28 Dam Street; 52.68482°N 1.82846°W	—	c. 1820	A brick house with stucco dressings on a plastered plinth, with a top cornice and a blocking course, and a slate roof. It is in Georgian style, and has three storeys and a front of three bays. The central doorway is approached by steps with handrails, and has pilasters, a frieze, and a pediment, and there is a smaller doorway to the right with a wedge lintel and keystone. The windows are sashes with panelled wedge lintels and keystones. At the rear are a gabled wing, and a wing with a hipped roof and an oriel window.	II
Knowle Lodge, wall and stable 52.66769°N 1.82040°W	—	c. 1820	The house is in stuccoed and painted brick, and has a hipped double-pitch slate roof. It is in Regency style, and has two storeys, and an L-shaped plan, with a front of four bays, a service wing at the rear on the right, and a billiard room. The porch has Ionic columns, a frieze and a cornice, and the door has a fanlight. To the left is a bay window, and the other windows are casements. On the garden front is a verandah. A screen wall with a round-arched gateway and an embattled parapet links the house with a two-storey stable range that has a hipped roof and a weathervane.	II
Lichfield District Council Offices (part), 39 St John Street; 52.68097°N 1.82789°W	—	c. 1820	A house, later an office, it is in brick with stone dressings on a plaster plinth, with a top cornice and blocking course, and a tile roof. It is in Georgian style, and has two storeys and an attic, a double-depth plan, and a symmetrical front of three bays. The central doorway has panelled pilaster strips, a fanlight with radial glazing bars, and a pediment on long brackets, and the windows are sashes.	II
The Cottage and The Little Cottage, 24 and 24A Stafford Road; 52.69099°N 1.84573°W	—	c. 1820	A house and a stable block converted into a house. It is in brick with a tile roof, and there are three blocks, each with two storeys. The two blocks on the right have modillion cornices and two bays each. In the right block is a canted bay window with a hipped roof, to its left is a doorway with a fanlight and a cornice, and the upper floor contains sash windows. The middle block is recessed and contains segmental-headed casement windows. The left block is further recessed and is roughcast, it contains three segmental-headed openings and an oriel window in the ground floor, and casement windows above.	II
1, 2 and 3 Lombard Gardens; 52.68535°N 1.82434°W	—	Early 19th century	A row of three brick houses with tile roofs in Georgian style. They have two storeys, a total of six bays, and at the rear are varied wings. Nos. 1 and 2 have round-headed doorways with fluted pilaster strips, a fanlight with radial glazing bars, and a cornice on consoles, and No. 3 has a doorway with a segmental head. The windows are sashes.	II
2 Quonian's Lane; 52.68442°N 1.82775°W	—	Early 19th century	The building is in painted brick with a tile roof. There are two storeys, an L-shaped plan, and a front of two bays. In the ground floor is a doorway with a segmental head, to the right is a three-light window, and to the left is a large three-light shop window. Above this is another large window, and to the right is a horizontally-sliding sash window.	II
Adie monument, St Michael's Church; 52.68366°N 1.81917°W	—	Early 19th century	The monument is in the churchyard and is to the memory of members of the Adie family. It is in stone, and has a sub-octagonal plinth with a cornice, and an ogival top with a moulded block containing swags and part of urn. There are plain panels to the faces, those at the front and back with inset oval panels.	II
Duart House, 31 St John Street; 52.68124°N 1.82815°W	—	Early 19th century	A house, later an office, stuccoed with stone dressings, and a tile roof with coped gables. It is in Georgian style, and has two ranges, forming a T-shaped plan. The left range has two storeys, three bays, a band, and a parapet. The doorway has a segmental head and a modillion cornice on long brackets, and to the left is a segmental-headed sash window. The right range projects forward, and has three storeys and two bays, a top frieze and cornice, and a blocking course. The ground floor contains a tripartite sash window with a segmental head, and the other windows are sashes with flat heads.	II
Passam tomb, St Chad's Church; 52.68925°N 1.82092°W	—	Early 19th century	The tomb is in the churchyard, and is to the memory of members of the Passim family. It is a chest tomb in stone, and has a plinth, square balusters carved with relief foliage and flowers, and a cornice to a faceted cap. On each side are inscribed slate panels.	II
Prince of Wales Public House, 4 Bore Street; 52.68222°N 1.82880°W	—	Early 19th century	The former public house is stuccoed, on a plinth, with a sill band, a top frieze, and a tile roof. There are three storeys and three bays. The doorway has a cornice, and the windows are casements, those in the lower two floors with wedge lintels and keystones.	II
Railings and gate, St Chad's Church; 52.68919°N 1.82086°W	—	Early 19th century (probable)	There are paired wrought iron gates with decorative panels, flanked by rusticated piers, and there is a similar end pier. To the right of the gateway is a short length of railings, and a longer length of about 35 metres (115 ft) to the left along the south side of the churchyard. The railings are on a stone base, they are in cast iron, and are moulded with spear finials.	II
Outbuildings, The Close; 52.68470°N 1.83204°W	—	Early 19th century	One outbuilding is attached to Newton's college and the other to the rear of No. 24 The Close. They are in brick with hipped roofs in tile and slate. Both outbuildings contain doorways and casement windows with segmental heads.	II
34, 36 and 38 Beacon Street; 52.68636°N 1.83410°W	—	c. 1830	A row of three brick houses with a modillion cornice and a tile roof. There are two storeys, five bays, and rear wings. The doorway to the right has panelled piasters, a frieze, and a cornice, and to its right is a segmental-headed entry. Near the centre is a former shop front with a cornice on corbelled shafts, a bow window, and a doorway with a fanlight. To the left is another entry with a segmental head, and the windows are sashes with segmental heads.	II
23, 25, 29 and 33 Levett's Fields; 52.68242°N 1.82353°W	—	c. 1830	A row of six cottages, later converted into four, they are in brick with stone dressings and a tile roof. There are two storeys and eight bays. The doorways have segmental-pointed heads, imposts, keystones, and blind tympani; two doorways have been converted into windows. The windows have similar features to the doorways, and contain casements; two of them are blind.	II
53, 55 and 57 Rotten Row; 52.68274°N 1.82045°W	—	c. 1830	A row of three brick houses with a top frieze and a tile roof. They are in Georgian style, and have three storeys and four bays, and a round-headed entry in the second bay. The doorways have faceted pilaster strips, friezes, and cornices, and most of the windows are sashes.	II
59–67 (odd) Rotten Row and walls 52.68265°N 1.82021°W	—	c. 1830	A terrace of five brick houses, with a modillion cornice and a tile roof. They are in Georgian style, and have two storeys, and six bays, with a round-headed entry in the centre. The doorways have panelled pilaster strips, friezes, and cornices, and the windows are sashes. Flanking the path to the entry and in front of the gardens are brick walls.	II
26, 26A and 28 Tamworth Street; 52.68384°N 1.82542°W	—	c. 1830	A house, later shops, it is in brick, partly painted, with stone dressings, a top cornice, and a tile roof. It is in Georgian style, and has a double-depth plan, three storeys, three bays, and a rear wing. The central doorway has a fanlight with decorative glazing bars, and a cornice on consoles. This is flanked by early 20th-century shop fronts with recessed entrances. The windows are sashes, those in the middle floor with friezes and cornices on consoles.	II
Berryhill House; 52.67150°N 1.82310°W	—	c. 1830	The house, which was extended later in the century, is stuccoed, with top cornices, blocking courses and parapets. There are two storeys and an attic, and a symmetrical front of four bays. The doorway is round-headed with a fanlight, and to the right are round-headed windows with impost bands, voussoirs and rusticated keystones. In the upper floors are sash windows, in the right return is a canted bay window, in the left return is a rectangular bay window, and at the rear is a stable range.	II
Victoria Cottage, 12 Stafford Road; 52.69051°N 1.84490°W	—	c. 1830	A brick house with a modillion cornice and a hipped slate roof. It is in Georgian style, with two storeys, a symmetrical front of three bays, and a single-storey rear wing. The central round-headed doorway has a fanlight, and there is a wrought iron trellis porch. This is flanked by canted bay windows with cornices, and the upper floor contains sash windows.	II
1 The Close; 52.68482°N 1.83261°W	—	c. 1835	A house with stone dressings on a plinth, with a coped parapet, and a tile roof with coped gables. It is in Jacobean style, with two storeys and a symmetrical front of three bays, the middle bay gabled and containing a shield with a coat of arms. The central doorway has a Tudor arch and a hood mould. The windows have chamfered mullions that are continuous in the upper floor.	II
24 Beacon Street; 52.68602°N 1.83367°W	—	1830s	A brick house, the right return plastered, on a plinth, with a modillion cornice, and a tile roof. There are three storeys, and L-shaped plan, with a front of two bays. The central doorway has panelled pilasters, a frieze and a pediment. In the lower two floors the windows are sashes, and in the top floor they are casements.	II
5 Queen Street; 52.68167°N 1.83210°W	—	1830s	A house, later an office, it was extended to the rear in the 20th century. The building is in brick with stone dressings, with end pilaster strips, a top cornice, and a tile roof. It is in Georgian style, with an L-shaped plan, three storeys, a symmetrical front of three bays, and a gabled wing and an outshut at the rear. The central doorway has panelled pilaster strips, a fanlight, and a pediment on long brackets, and the windows are sashes.	II
The Queen's Head Public House, 4 Queen Street; 52.68178°N 1.83239°W	—	1830s	The public house is in brick with end pilaster strips and a tile roof. There are three storeys, a symmetrical front of three bays, and a single-storey service wing to the left. The central doorway has panelled pilaster strips, a radial fanlight, and a pediment on long brackets. In the ground floor the windows are small-paned, and the upper floors contain sash windows.	II
Dr Johnson Statue, Market Square; 52.68364°N 1.82776°W		1838	The statue of Dr Samuel Johnson is by Richard Cockle Lucas, and is in stone. It depicts Dr Johnson sitting, dressed in academic robes, deep in thought, on a chair with books beneath it. This is on a plinth with a moulded base. On three sides of the plinth are panels depicting episodes from Johnson's life in relief, and on the fourth side is an inscription and a later plaque.	II*
Former St Mary's Infants' School, Pool Walk; 52.68377°N 1.83045°W	—	1840	The school was extended in 1869, and is in brick with diapering, stone dressings, and a slate roof with a coped gable. There is one storey, four bays and a cross-wing. The windows are mullioned or transomed with small panes, and there is a roundel.	II
Gatehouse Range, St Michael's Hospital; 52.68494°N 1.81593°W	—	1841	Originally the gatehouse range to a workhouse, later a hospital, it was designed by Scott and Moffatt. It is in red brick with blue brick diapering, stone dressings, and tile roofs. The range has a symmetrical front with a central two-storey gatehouse, and flanking one-storey wings, with projecting two-storey gabled bays towards the ends. The gatehouse has a carriage entrance with a four-centred arch, diagonal buttresses, a top cornice, and an embattled parapet. In the left part of the range are two doorways with architraves and four-centred heads, and the windows have double-chamfered mullions and transoms.	II
Rear Range, St Michael's Hospital; 52.68511°N 1.81602°W	—	1841	Originally the master's house and flanking male and female wings to a workhouse, later a hospital. It was designed by Scott and Moffatt, and built in red brick with blue brick diapering and tile roofs. There are two storeys, the central three bays also have an attic, a Tudor arched porch, gables and an ogee-roofed cupola. The central range is flanked by canted bays, recessed five-bay ranges and two-bay cross-wings.	II
Easter Hill and The Old Vicarage, Christchurch Lane; 52.67892°N 1.84525°W	—	1840s	A vicarage with a later rear extension, subsequently converted into flats, it is stuccoed, the rear range is in brick, and has angle pilaster strips, wide eaves, and a hipped slate roof. The house is in late Georgian style, and has two storeys, a double-depth plan, and a front of three bays. In the centre is a porch with a cornice and a segmental arch, and to the left is a canted bay window with a cornice; the other windows are sashes. In the rear wing is a doorway with a round head, fluted pilaster strips, a fanlight, and an open pediment on consoles.	II
Christ Church, Leomansley; 52.68140°N 1.84076°W		1847	The transepts were added in 1886–87. The church is built in stone with a tile roof, and is in Decorated style. It has a cruciform plan, consisting of a nave, north and south transepts, a chancel, and a west tower. The tower has a west doorway with a moulded arch, a clock face, a top traceried frieze, and an embattled parapet with pinnacles.	II*
The Corn Exchange, Conduit Street; 52.68368°N 1.82692°W		1849–50	The corn exchange and market hall have later been used for other purposes. The building is in brick with stone dressings, and a tile roof with a coped parapet. It is in Tudor style, and has two storeys, and a front of seven bays, the ground floor containing an arcade with four-centred arches. The parapet has round projections, there are gables with pinnacles, some of which are shaped, and an octagonal pavilion with a pyramidal roof. The windows have chamfered mullions, some also have transoms, and in the left bay is a canted oriel window. Along the side are panels with lettering spelling out "THE CORN EXCHANGE".	II
4 Lombard Gardens; 52.68545°N 1.82444°W	—	Mid 19th century	A brick house with a modillioned cornice, and a tile roof with coped gables. There are two storeys and a symmetrical three-bay front. In the centre is a canted bay containing the doorway that has a fanlight, above which is weatherboarding between the floors and a top cornice. The windows are sashes, those in the outer bays with segmental heads.	II
Wall, gates and gate piers, Lombard Street; 52.68506°N 1.82434°W	—	Mid 19th century	The wall is in brick with moulded stone capping. At the left end is the carriage entrance to Lombard Gardens that has square gate piers with gabled inscribed caps. It contains paired iron gates, and a single gate to the right. At the right end are similar gates, and at the rear are buttresses.	II
Three Hinckley family tombs, Christ Church; 52.68149°N 1.84027°W	—	1851–70	The tombs are in the churchyard, they are to the memory of members of the Hinkley family, and are chest tombs in stone. Each tomb has a plinth, traceried panelled sides, and on the ends are an armorial bearing and a motto.	II
St Mary's Church; 52.68361°N 1.82744°W		1853	The church replaces an earlier church on the site. The steeple is the older part, it was designed by G. E. Street, the rest of the church following in 1868–70, designed by James Fowler in Decorated style. The church is in stone with tile roofs, and consists of a nave with a clerestory, north and south aisles, a chancel with a north chapel and a south vestry and organ chamber, and a west steeple. The steeple has a tower with gabled angle buttresses, a west entrance with a crocketed gable and pinnacles, a four-light west window, a quatrefoil frieze and pinnacles, and a spire with three tiers of lucarnes. The east window has seven lights.	II*
Balustrade, Museum Gardens, Bird Street; 52.68395°N 1.83195°W	—	1850s	The balustrade, which is in stone, runs along the southwest side of the street for about 45.5 metres (149 ft). It has a plain plinth, and contains sub-octagonal piers, four of them surmounted by urns. Between the balusters are four-centred arches.	II
Former Probate Court and railings, Bird Street; 52.68440°N 1.83260°W		1856–58	The purpose-built probate court, later offices, is in brick with stone dressings, top cornices, and tile roofs. The main range has one storey and a basement, a double-depth plan, and two bays, and to the right is a cross-wing with two storeys and an attic, and one bay. In the main range, steps lead up to a central doorway with an elliptical head and a moulded arch and hood, and above it is an inscribed frieze. Flanking the doorway are three-light mullioned windows with sashes in architraves, and in the basement are segmental-headed windows with chamfered surrounds. The cross-wing has a canted bay window in the ground floor, and above is a three-light mullioned window, and a two-light half-dormer with a hipped roof. Enclosing the basement area are iron railings.	II
Former Public Library, Art Gallery and balustrades, Bird Street; 52.68420°N 1.83243°W		1857–59	The building is in brick with stone dressings and a parapeted roof. It is in Renaissance style, and has a right angle plan with an octagonal tower in the angle. There are two storeys and a basement, three bays facing the street, and six bays on the left return. The ground floor of the tower is rusticated and has piers and an entablature. It contains a round-headed doorway with a fanlight, and round-headed windows with voussoirs and keystones. The stage above has an entablature and a plinth containing an inscribed plaque and two roundels, and the top stage contains three round-headed windows. This is surmounted by a cupola with round-headed windows, a modillion cornice, and a domed roof with a weathervane. On the sides are buttresses, flat-headed sash windows that have tympani with voussoirs and keystones, and above are blind round-arched arcades. The forecourt is enclosed by a low brick wall and a stone balustrade.	II
Clock Tower, The Friary; 52.68138°N 1.83059°W		1863	The clock tower, which was moved to its present site in 1928, is in stone with a pyramidal slate roof and a finial. It is in Norman style, and has four stages. The lowest stage contains a round-headed doorway, with zig-zag decoration on the arch and a decorated tympanum, inscribed plaques, and niches for former drinking fountains. In the second stage are three-light blind windows with five-light blind windows above, all with round heads. The third stage has a round clock face on each side, and in the top stage are four-light bell openings.	II
38 Tamworth Street; 52.68391°N 1.82477°W	—	1865	A brick shop with stone dressings on a plinth, that has a large cornice with egg and dart moulding and a double-span slate roof. There are two storeys, a double-depth plan and a symmetrical front of three bays. In the centre is a round-headed entrance with a large cornice on brackets in the form of cockerels, and a dated keystone. This is flanked by shop windows, in the upper floor are sash windows with segmental heads, and at the rear is an elliptical-headed cart entrance.	II
9 and 11 Beacon Street; 52.68554°N 1.83355°W		1860s	A pair of brick houses with stone dressings, string courses, a top fascia with pendants, gables with plain bargeboards, and a tile roof. It is in Gothic style, and has two storeys and an attic, and five bays, the fourth bay projecting, wider, and gabled. The doorway of No. 9 has a flat head with a keystone, and a door with a segmental head and a three-light fanlight. The door to No. 11 is similar but with a segmental head. In the ground floor are two three-light windows, the right window with a hood mould stepped over an armorial shield. The upper floor contains windows with pointed heads and shafts with foliate capitals, and there are two gabled dormers.	II
Law Monument, St Michael's Church; 52.68424°N 1.81797°W	—	Mid to late 19th century	The monument is in the churchyard and is to the memory of James Thomas Law and his wife. It is in stone, and has a rectangular plan and two steps. On the sides are three trefoil-headed arches, and two similar arches on the ends, a hood mould, and a moulded frieze. On the top is a cornice with brattishing, and a pyramidal roof, and a finial consisting of a roundel containing a cross.	II
The Palace Cottage and stables, The Close; 52.68595°N 1.83072°W	—	c. 1870	The former lodge and stables are in stone, and have tile roofs with coped gables and kneelers. The lodge consists of a two-storey one-bay range, and a single-storey wing to the left, and the stable block to the right has an L-shaped plan. On the lodge is a canted bay window with a hipped roof, the windows are mullioned, and the left wing has a parapet. The stable contains casement windows, a doorway, a pitching hole, and a triangular dovecote.	II
Fountain, Museum Gardens; 52.68369°N 1.83256°W		1871	The fountain has a round basin with a rusticated surround and four projecting platforms carrying crouched lions. The centre is in iron and consists of a basin on an octagonal base decorated with herons, fish and reed mace, and with a capital that has egg and dart moulding. On the top is a figure with two fish tails, a wreath around the head, and blowing a conical shell.	II
Engine house, Sandfields Pumping Station; 52.67356°N 1.83488°W		1872–73	The engine house, now disused, was built by the South Staffordshire Waterworks Company. It is in blue brick with dressings in red and yellow brick, stone sills, polychromatic bands, a polychromatic frieze, a stone-coped parapet with decorative machicolations, and a slate roof. The building has a rectangular plan in free Italianate style, and has two storeys over a basement, and four bays. The windows are round-headed in round-headed recesses, at the left is a single-storey annex, and a pumphouse was added in 1966.	II*
Lamp post (north), The Close; 52.68534°N 1.83131°W		c. 1880	The lamp post is in cast and wrought iron. It has a moulded plinth, a fluted post, a twisted top section, and a cluster of four shafts with finials and scrolled decoration. The lantern has a scrolled base, canted angles, and a pyramidal cap with cresting.	II
Lamp post (south), The Close; 52.68510°N 1.83110°W		c. 1880	The lamp post is in cast and wrought iron. It has a moulded plinth, a fluted post, a twisted top section, and a cluster of four shafts with finials and scrolled decoration. The lantern has a scrolled base, canted angles, and a pyramidal cap with cresting.	II
Beacon School; 52.68907°N 1.84176°W	—	1893	The school is in red brick with dressings in Bath stone, and slate roofs with hipped and gabled ends. The main range contains a central cross-wing and flanking ranges, there are rear wings round a courtyard, a superintendent's house at the left, and a detached sanatorium block. The cross-wing has three storeys and two bays, the flanking ranges have nine bays each, and the superintendent's house has two storeys and five bays. The cross-wing has two round-headed doorways and windows, all with voussoirs and keyblocks, and the gable rises to a central parapet.	II
Boswell Statue, Market Square; 52.68386°N 1.82747°W		1908	The statue of James Boswell is by Percy Fitzgerald. It is in stone, with the figure and panels in bronze. The statue depicts Boswell standing, with a sword and a hat. On the plinth are three panels depicting in relief scenes for the lives of Boswell and Johnson, and on the front is an inscription and an armorial crest. Surrounding the statue are wrought iron railings.	II
Edward VII Statue, Museum Gardens; 52.68384°N 1.83227°W		1908	The statue of Edward VII is by Robert Bridgeman and is in stone. It has a round plinth that has an entablature with rosettes on the frieze and a dentilled cornice. There are four projections supporting pilaster strips with scrolled bases, lion's masks holding rings with pendants of fruit, and panels inscribed with the names of the dominions of the British Empire. On the front is "EDWARD VII", a crown, and the Lichfield coat of arms, and the cap has a cornice with ball finials. The plinth is surmounted by the standing figure of the king, wearing the robes of the Order of the Garter, and holding the sceptre.	II
Captain Edward Smith Statue, Museum Gardens; 52.68345°N 1.83303°W		1914	The statue of Edward John Smith, captain of RMS Titanic, is by Kathleen Scott. It has a granite base consisting of a plinth on steps, on which is a bronze standing figure with folded arms, wearing an overcoat and cap. On the plinth is an inscribed bronze plaque.	II
War Memorial, walls, balustrades, gate and gate piers 52.68433°N 1.83126°W		1920	The war memorial was designed by Charles Bateman. The centrepiece is a stone screen in Renaissance style. In the centre is a pediment on reeded and fluted Roman Ionic pilasters, containing a shell-headed niche with a statue of St George and a dragon in Portland stone. The outer compartments have end piers surmounted by urn pinnacles, and containing wreaths. The lower parts of each section contain plaques in Westmorland slate with inscriptions and the names of those lost in the two World Wars. Associated with the screen are garden walls, gates, gate piers, and balustrades.	II*
Telephone kiosk by 20 St John Street; 52.68155°N 1.82887°W	—	1935	A K6 type telephone kiosk, designed by Giles Gilbert Scott. It is constructed in cast iron with a square plan and a dome, and has three unperforated crowns in the top panels.	II
Two telephone kiosks northwest of Corn Exchange; 52.68375°N 1.82713°W	—	1935	A pair of K6 type telephone kiosks, designed by Giles Gilbert Scott. They are constructed in cast iron with a square plan and a dome, and have three unperforated crowns in the top panels.	II

== Sources ==
- Historic England, "St Chad's Well approximately 34 metres to north-west of Church of St Chad, Lichfield (1292144)", National Heritage List for England
- Historic England, "Church of St Chad, Lichfield (1298398)", National Heritage List for England
- Historic England, "Cathedral Church of the Blessed Virgin Mary and St Chad, Lichfield (1298431)", National Heritage List for England
- Historic England, "Wall to front and right return of garden to No. 20 St John Street, Lichfield (1298400)", National Heritage List for England
- Historic England, "Church of St Michael, Lichfield (1292420)", National Heritage List for England
- Historic England, "Lichfield College and Lichfield Library, Lichfield (1194881)", National Heritage List for England
- Historic England, "Causeway Bridge to end of Minster Pool, Lichfield (1292574)", National Heritage List for England
- Historic England, "Remains of West Gate, Lichfield (1291737)", National Heritage List for England
- Historic England, "Bastion to north-east angle and attached walls of garden of former Episcopal Palace, Lichfield (1194878)", National Heritage List for England
- Historic England, "St Mary's House and attached wall, Lichfield (1218902)", National Heritage List for England
- Historic England, "No. 5 The Close, Lichfield (1194869)", National Heritage List for England
- Historic England, "No. 6 The Close, Lichfield (1298427)", National Heritage List for England
- Historic England, "Bradshaws, Lichfield (1298736)", National Heritage List for England
- Historic England, "No. 7 The Close, Lichfield (1218470)", National Heritage List for England
- Historic England, "No. 10 The Close, Lichfield (1194871)", National Heritage List for England
- Historic England, "No. 11 The Close, Lichfield (1218554)", National Heritage List for England
- Historic England, "Nos. 1–12 and 12A Vicars' Close (flats) and Vicars' Hall, Lichfield (1194880)", National Heritage List for England
- Historic England, "No. 24 The Close and attached wall and gate pier, Lichfield (1298430)", National Heritage List for England
- Historic England, "Nos. 23A and 23B The Close and attached wall and gate, Lichfield (1218599)", National Heritage List for England
- Historic England, "Hospital of St John without the Barrs and Chapel, Lichfield (1218231)", National Heritage List for England
- Historic England, "Master's House to rear of Hospital of St John without the Barrs, Lichfield (1298403)", National Heritage List for England
- Historic England, "No. 15 Bird Street and No. 2 Sandford Street, Lichfield (1209022)", National Heritage List for England
- Historic England, "Cruck House, Lichfield (1194899)", National Heritage List for England
- Historic England, "Milley's Hospital, Lichfield (1187347)", National Heritage List for England
- Historic England, "No. 32 Bore Street, Lichfield (1292495)", National Heritage List for England
- Historic England, "Nos. 13 and 14 The Close and attached low wall, gate piers and overthrow, Lichfield (1218557)", National Heritage List for England
- Historic England, "No. 7 Church Street, Lichfield (1245241)", National Heritage List for England
- Historic England, "Nos. 12 and 14 Dam Street, Lichfield (1209964)", National Heritage List for England
- Historic England, "The Swan, Lichfield (1298562)", National Heritage List for England
- Historic England, "No. 25 Dam Street, Lichfield (1209996)", National Heritage List for England
- Historic England, "No. 6 Sandford Street, Lichfield (1194896)", National Heritage List for England
- Historic England, "Nos. 11 and 13 Market Street, Lichfield (1187727)", National Heritage List for England
- Historic England, "Nos. 16 and 16A Market Street, Lichfield (1298559)", National Heritage List for England
- Historic England, "Causeway House, Lichfield (1187750)", National Heritage List for England
- Historic England, "St Mary's Chambers, Lichfield (1292482)", National Heritage List for England
- Historic England, "Nos. 38–44 Bore Street, Lichfield (1298567)", National Heritage List for England
- Historic England, "No. 22 Market Street, Lichfield (1217933)", National Heritage List for England
- Historic England, "Nos. 45 and 47 Stowe Street, Lichfield (1218356)", National Heritage List for England
- Historic England, "Garage immediately to west of No. 15 The Close, Lichfield (1298429)", National Heritage List for England
- Historic England, "Nos. 67 and 69 Tamworth Street, Lichfield (1194867)", National Heritage List for England
- Historic England, "The Staffordshire Bookshop (part), Lichfield (1292381)", National Heritage List for England
- Historic England, "No. 19 Dam Street, Lichfield (1292398)", National Heritage List for England
- Historic England, "Nos. 20 and 22 Dam Street, Lichfield (1298571)", National Heritage List for England
- Historic England, "Nos. 7, 9 and 11 Lombard Street, Lichfield (1210090)", National Heritage List for England
- Historic England, "Nos. 9, 9A and 9B The Close, Lichfield (1218478)", National Heritage List for England
- Historic England, "Quonians House and attached wall and outbuilding, Lichfield (1187748)", National Heritage List for England
- Historic England, "Nos. 49 and 49A Tamworth Street, Lichfield (1298424)", National Heritage List for England
- Historic England, "Nos. 12 and 12A Lombard Street, Lichfield (1187722)", National Heritage List for England
- Historic England, "No. 15 The Close, Lichfield (1194872)", National Heritage List for England
- Historic England, "Cathedral Visitors' Study Centre and attached wall and gate, Lichfield (1218787)", National Heritage List for England
- Historic England, "Monument approximately 35 metres north-west of porch of Church of St Michael, Lichfield (1209909)", National Heritage List for England
- Historic England, "Lichfield District Council Offices (part) and attached wall and gates, Lichfield (1218214)", National Heritage List for England
- Historic England, "Gregory headstone approximately 10 metres north-west of porch of Church of St Michael, Lichfield (1209884)", National Heritage List for England
- Historic England, "St Chad's Cathedral School and Chapel, Lichfield (1218871)", National Heritage List for England
- Historic England, "Front wall and gate piers to courtyard of former Episcopal Palace, Lichfield (1218888)", National Heritage List for England
- Historic England, "Taylor headstone approximately 11 metres south of south aisle of Church of St Chad, Lichfield (1298399)", National Heritage List for England
- Historic England, "Croft headstone approximately 15 metres south of chancel of Church of St Chad, Lichfield (1194890)", National Heritage List for England
- Historic England, "Nos. 9 and 11 Dam Street, Lichfield (1292385)", National Heritage List for England
- Historic England, "No. 20 St John Street, Lichfield (1292115)", National Heritage List for England
- Historic England, "No. 13 Dam Street, Lichfield (1187749)", National Heritage List for England
- Historic England, "Nos. 5 and 7 Greenhill, Lichfield (1187716)", National Heritage List for England
- Historic England, "No. 25 Lombard Street, Lichfield (1187724)", National Heritage List for England
- Historic England, "No. 1 Quonian's Lane, Lichfield (1194886)", National Heritage List for England
- Historic England, "Nos. 41, 43 and 45 Tamworth Street, Lichfield (1218419)", National Heritage List for England
- Historic England, "Ardmore Cottage, Nether Beacon House and Ardmore House, Lichfield (1208984)", National Heritage List for England
- Historic England, "Netherstowe House (North) and Netherstowe House (south), Lichfield (1292221)", National Heritage List for England
- Historic England, "Sundial immediately to south of Nave of Cathedral, Lichfield (1218802)", National Heritage List for England
- Historic England, "Johnson Birthplace Museum, Lichfield (1292492)", National Heritage List for England
- Historic England, "The Deanery and attached gate, Lichfield (1218904)", National Heritage List for England
- Historic England, "Front garden wall and gate piers to The Deanery, Lichfield (1194879)", National Heritage List for England
- Historic England, "Nos. 2, 3 and 4 The Close, Lichfield (1298426)", National Heritage List for England
- Historic England, "Two cartouche headstones approximately 13 metres south of chancel of Church of St Chad, Lichfield (1218126)", National Heritage List for England
- Historic England, "Nos. 7 and 9 Breadmarket Street, Lichfield (1187741)", National Heritage List for England
- Historic England, "No. 33 Market Street, Lichfield (1298560)", National Heritage List for England
- Historic England, "No. 39 Market Street, Lichfield (1292217)", National Heritage List for England
- Historic England, "Nos. 23 and 25 St John Street, Lichfield (1218134)", National Heritage List for England
- Historic England, "Nos. 11, 11A and 13 Tamworth Street, Lichfield (1292012)", National Heritage List for England
- Historic England, "Stowe House, Lichfield (1187731)", National Heritage List for England
- Historic England, "Donegal House and attached railings, Lichfield (1209722)", National Heritage List for England
- Historic England, "Lichfield Mercury, Lichfield (1209032)", National Heritage List for England
- Historic England, "Nos. 12 and 14 Conduit Street, Lichfield (1209911)", National Heritage List for England
- Historic England, "No. 28 Market Street, Lichfield (1217936)", National Heritage List for England
- Historic England, "Nos. 41 and 43 Market Street, Lichfield (1298561)", National Heritage List for England
- Historic England, "No. 27 St John Street, Lichfield (1194893)", National Heritage List for England
- Historic England, "No. 29 St John Street, Lichfield (1292107)", National Heritage List for England
- Historic England, "Nos. 42 and 44 Tamworth Street, Lichfield (1298405)", National Heritage List for England
- Historic England, "Lyddan House, Lichfield (1298569)", National Heritage List for England
- Historic England, "The Scales Public House, Lichfield (1187728)", National Heritage List for England
- Historic England, "Nos. 24 and 26 Bore Street, Lichfield (1187738)", National Heritage List for England
- Historic England, "Marlborough House, Lichfield (1218135)", National Heritage List for England
- Historic England, "Nos. 9 and 11 Bird Street, Lichfield (1292882)", National Heritage List for England
- Historic England, "No. 7 Market Street, Lichfield (1292228)", National Heritage List for England
- Historic England, "Nos. 1, 3 and 5 Tamworth Street, Lichfield (1218375)", National Heritage List for England
- Historic England, "Angel Croft Hotel and attached outbuilding, front railings and gates, Lichfield (1187354)", National Heritage List for England
- Historic England, "Moat House and attached wall to left and outbuilding to rear, Lichfield (1209606)", National Heritage List for England
- Historic England, "Samuel's Public House, Lichfield (1298558)", National Heritage List for England
- Historic England, "Westgate House and attached outbuildings, front walls, gates and railings, Lichfield (1298734)", National Heritage List for England
- Historic England, "Nos. 6 and 8 Bird Street and No. 2 Market Street, Lichfield (1187356)", National Heritage List for England
- Historic England, "No. 7 Dam Street, Lichfield (1209946)", National Heritage List for England
- Historic England, "Nos. 1 and 3 Greenhill, Lichfield (1298555)", National Heritage List for England
- Historic England, "No. 17 Greenhill, Lichfield (1298556)", National Heritage List for England
- Historic England, "Nos. 19 and 21 Greenhill, Lichfield (1187717)", National Heritage List for England
- Historic England, "The Lombard Chinese Restaurant (part), Lichfield (1187721)", National Heritage List for England
- Historic England, "No. 14A Lombard Street and attached garden wall and pump, Lichfield (1187723)", National Heritage List for England
- Historic England, "Nos. 57 and 59 Tamworth Street, Lichfield (1298425)", National Heritage List for England
- Historic England, "No. 8 The Close, Lichfield (1194870)", National Heritage List for England
- Historic England, "Beacon Lodge and attached wall and railings, Lichfield (1208970)", National Heritage List for England
- Historic England, "Duke of York Public House, Lichfield (1210053)", National Heritage List for England
- Historic England, "Pool House and attached former stable block, Lichfield (1298572)", National Heritage List for England
- Historic England, "St Chad's School House, Lichfield (1298428)", National Heritage List for England
- Historic England, "Stafford Road Pinfold, Lichfield (1194898)", National Heritage List for England
- Historic England, "Stowe Hill, Lichfield (1298772)", National Heritage List for England
- Historic England, "Westgate Cottage, Lichfield (1187345)", National Heritage List for England
- Historic England, "Darwin House, Lichfield (1187355)", National Heritage List for England
- Historic England, "Nos. 7, 9 and 9A Tamworth Street, Lichfield (1194901)", National Heritage List for England
- Historic England, "No. 40 Tamworth Street, Lichfield (1194904)", National Heritage List for England
- Historic England, "Stowe Gate House, Lichfield (1217810)", National Heritage List for England
- Historic England, "Nos. 31 and 33 Bore Street, Lichfield (1187739)", National Heritage List for England
- Historic England, "Nos. 16 and 18 Conduit Street, Lichfield (1187746)", National Heritage List for England
- Historic England, "No. 16 Dam Street, Lichfield (1209975)", National Heritage List for England
- Historic England, "No. 23 Dam Street, Lichfield (1292363)", National Heritage List for England
- Historic England, "Nos. 30 and 32 Market Street, Lichfield (1292211)", National Heritage List for England
- Historic England, "Nos. 34 and 36 Market Street, Lichfield (1292214)", National Heritage List for England
- Historic England, "Nos. 35 and 37 Market Street, Lichfield (1187730)", National Heritage List for England
- Historic England, "Nos. 51, 53 and 55 Tamworth Street, Lichfield (1194866)", National Heritage List for England
- Historic England, "King's Head Public House, Lichfield (1209036)", National Heritage List for England
- Historic England, "St John's Preparatory School and attached garden wall, Lichfield (1292101)", National Heritage List for England
- Historic England, "Dimble House, Lichfield (1025252)", National Heritage List for England
- Historic England, "Garrick House, Lichfield (1218016)", National Heritage List for England
- Historic England, "Langton House, Lichfield (1298738)", National Heritage List for England
- Historic England, "No. 17 Bore Street, Lichfield (1298565)", National Heritage List for England
- Historic England, "No. 27 Bore Street, Lichfield (1209697)", National Heritage List for England
- Historic England, "No. 29 Bore Street, Lichfield (1292530)", National Heritage List for England
- Historic England, "No. 36 Bore Street, Lichfield (1292499)", National Heritage List for England
- Historic England, "Nos. 10, 10A and 10B Dam Street, Lichfield (1298570)", National Heritage List for England
- Historic England, "No. 9 Sandford Street, Lichfield (1218311)", National Heritage List for England
- Historic England, "Earl of Lichfield Arms Public House, Lichfield (1298568)", National Heritage List for England
- Historic England, "George Hotel, Lichfield (1298735)", National Heritage List for England
- Historic England, "Minster House, Lichfield (1242891)", National Heritage List for England
- Historic England, "Old Windmill House, Lichfield (1187715)", National Heritage List for England
- Historic England, "Nos. 19, 19A and 21 Bore Street, Lichfield (1209696)", National Heritage List for England
- Historic England, "No. 35 Lombard Street, Lichfield (1292295)", National Heritage List for England
- Historic England, "No. 3 Market Street, Lichfield (1217875)", National Heritage List for England
- Historic England, "Nos. 15 and 17 Market Street, Lichfield (1217929)", National Heritage List for England
- Historic England, "No. 15 Sandford Street, Lichfield (1194897)", National Heritage List for England
- Historic England, "Selwyn House, Lichfield (1194877)", National Heritage List for England
- Historic England, "Conduit to north-west corner of The Close, Lichfield (1298432)", National Heritage List for England
- Historic England, "No. 8 Bore Street, Lichfield (1187735)", National Heritage List for England
- Historic England, "No. 10 Bore Street, Lichfield (1298564)", National Heritage List for England
- Historic England, "Ruskins, Lichfield (1187358)", National Heritage List for England
- Historic England, "Prospect of Lichfield, Lichfield (1298737)", National Heritage List for England
- Historic England, "Nos. 32 and 34 Bird Street, Lichfield (1209547)", National Heritage List for England
- Historic England, "Nos. 2, 3 and 4 Dam Street, Lichfield (1209935)", National Heritage List for England
- Historic England, "No. 2 Gaia Lane, Lichfield (1187714)", National Heritage List for England
- Historic England, "No. 14 Lombard Street and attached front garden wall and railings, Lichfield (1210100)", National Heritage List for England
- Historic England, "No. 29 Market Street, Lichfield (1187729)", National Heritage List for England
- Historic England, "Nos. 1–9A Newton's Close and attached gate pier, Lichfield (1194875)", National Heritage List for England
- Historic England, "No. 10 Newton's Close, Lichfield (1291774)", National Heritage List for England
- Historic England, "No. 28 Sandford Street, Lichfield (1218316)", National Heritage List for England
- Historic England, "Nos. 9 and 11 St John Street, Lichfield (1194891)", National Heritage List for England
- Historic England, "Nos. 29 and 31 Tamworth Street, Lichfield (1218405)", National Heritage List for England
- Historic England, "Nos. 19, 19A and 19B The Close, Lichfield (1218582)", National Heritage List for England
- Historic England, "Borrowcop Pavilion, Lichfield (1187718)", National Heritage List for England
- Historic England, "Old College House, Lichfield (1187713)", National Heritage List for England
- Historic England, "Three Spires House, Lichfield (1187357)", National Heritage List for England
- Historic England, "No. 25 Bird Street, Lichfield (1187359)", National Heritage List for England
- Historic England, "Former conduit to south-west corner of garden to No. 15 The Close, Lichfield (1218563)", National Heritage List for England
- Historic England, "No. 1 Whitehall, Lichfield (1194883)", National Heritage List for England
- Historic England, "No. 20 Beacon Street, Lichfield (1187349)", National Heritage List for England
- Historic England, "No. 32 Beacon Street, Lichfield (1208906)", National Heritage List for England
- Historic England, "No. 50 Beacon Street, Lichfield (1292868)", National Heritage List for England
- Historic England, "No. 10 Bird Street and Nos. 1 and 1A Market Street, Lichfield (1209000)", National Heritage List for England
- Historic England, "No. 26 Bird Street, Lichfield (1209540)", National Heritage List for England
- Historic England, "No. 16 Bore Street, Lichfield (1187736)", National Heritage List for England
- Historic England, "Nos. 18, 20 and 22 Bore Street, Lichfield (1187737)", National Heritage List for England
- Historic England, "The Cottage and The Little Cottage, Lichfield (1218346)", National Heritage List for England
- Historic England, "No. 23 Lombard Street, Lichfield (1210171)", National Heritage List for England
- Historic England, "Garden house in rear garden of No. 6 Nether Beacon, Lichfield (1292219)", National Heritage List for England
- Historic England, "Nos. 30, 32, 32A and 34 St John Street, Lichfield (1194894)", National Heritage List for England
- Historic England, "Nos. 30 and 30A, Tamworth Street, Lichfield (1194903)", National Heritage List for England
- Historic England, "Brooke House, Lichfield (1187751)", National Heritage List for England
- Historic England, "Lombard Court, Lichfield (1292289)", National Heritage List for England
- Historic England, "United Reformed Church, Lichfield (1218960)", National Heritage List for England
- Historic England, "No. 26 Beacon Street, Lichfield (1187351)", National Heritage List for England
- Historic England, "No. 20 The Close, Lichfield (1194873)", National Heritage List for England
- Historic England, "No. 5 Beacon Street, Lichfield (1187346)", National Heritage List for England
- Historic England, "No. 30 Beacon Street, Lichfield (1187352)", National Heritage List for England
- Historic England, "No. 48 Beacon Street, Lichfield (1187353)", National Heritage List for England
- Historic England, "Nos. 54 and 56 Beacon Street, Lichfield (1298773)", National Heritage List for England
- Historic England, "No. 1 Bird Street, Lichfield (1025268)", National Heritage List for England
- Historic England, "Nos. 28 and 30 Bore Street, Lichfield (1298566)", National Heritage List for England
- Historic England, "Cooper House, Lichfield (1210001)", National Heritage List for England
- Historic England, "Knowle Lodge and attached screen wall and stable, Lichfield (1187719)", National Heritage List for England
- Historic England, "Lichfield District Council Offices (part), Lichfield (1298402)", National Heritage List for England
- Historic England, "Nos. 1, 2 and 3 Lombard Gardens, Lichfield (1187720)", National Heritage List for England
- Historic England, "No. 2 Quonian's Lane, Lichfield (1194887)", National Heritage List for England
- Historic England, "Adie monument approximately 45 metres north-west of porch of Church of St Michael, Lichfield (1187744)", National Heritage List for England
- Historic England, "Duart House, Lichfield (1218204)", National Heritage List for England
- Historic England, "Passam tomb approximately 13.5 metres south of south aisle of Church of St Chad, Lichfield (1218118)", National Heritage List for England
- Historic England, "Prince of Wales Public House, Lichfield (1187734)", National Heritage List for England
- Historic England, "Railings and gate to south of Church of St Chad, Museum Gardens, Lichfield (1194889)", National Heritage List for England
- Historic England, "Outbuilding to south of Newton's College and attached outbuilding to No. 24 The Close, Lichfield (1194876)", National Heritage List for England
- Historic England, "Nos. 34, 36 and 38 Beacon Street, Lichfield (1208951)", National Heritage List for England
- Historic England, "Nos. 23, 25, 29 and 33 Levett's Fields, Lichfield (1210075)", National Heritage List for England
- Historic England, "Nos. 53, 55 and 57 Rotten Row, Lichfield (1298397)", National Heritage List for England
- Historic England, "Nos. 59–67 (odd) Rotten Row and attached walls, Lichfield (1194888)", National Heritage List for England
- Historic England, "Nos. 26, 26A and 28 Tamworth Street, Lichfield (1194902)", National Heritage List for England
- Historic England, "Berryhill House, Lichfield (1187725)", National Heritage List for England
- Historic England, "Victoria Cottage, Lichfield (1298404)", National Heritage List for England
- Historic England, "No. 1 The Close, Lichfield (1194868)", National Heritage List for England
- Historic England, "No. 24 Beacon Street, Lichfield (1187350)", National Heritage List for England
- Historic England, "No. 5 Queen Street, Lichfield (1298396)", National Heritage List for England
- Historic England, "The Queen's Head Public House, Lichfield (1194885)", National Heritage List for England
- Historic England, "Dr Johnson Statue, Lichfield (1217846)", National Heritage List for England
- Historic England, "Former St Mary's Infants' School, Lichfield (1187732)", National Heritage List for England
- Historic England, "Gatehouse range to front of St Michael's Hospital, Lichfield (1218929)", National Heritage List for England
- Historic England, "St Michaels Hospital rear Range, Lichfield (1033360)", National Heritage List for England
- Historic England, "Easter Hill and The Old Vicarage, Lichfield (1209846)", National Heritage List for England
- Historic England, "Christ Church, Lichfield (1209813)", National Heritage List for England
- Historic England, "The Corn Exchange, Lichfield (1209913)", National Heritage List for England
- Historic England, "No. 4 Lombard Gardens, Lichfield (1210083)", National Heritage List for England
- Historic England, "Wall extending approximately 14 metres south-west from No. 35 Lombard Street, and gates and gate piers, Lichfield (1298557)", National Heritage List for England
- Historic England, "Three Hinckley family tombs immediately east of Christ Church, Lichfield (1187743)", National Heritage List for England
- Historic England, "Church of St Mary, Lichfield (1292270)", National Heritage List for England
- Historic England, "Balustrade to Museum Gardens, Lichfield (1209638)", National Heritage List for England
- Historic England, "Former Probate Court and attached area railings, Lichfield (1187360)", National Heritage List for England
- Historic England, "Former Public Library and Art Gallery and attached balustrades, Lichfield (1209580)", National Heritage List for England
- Historic England, "Clock Tower, Lichfield (1218909)", National Heritage List for England
- Historic England, "No. 38 Tamworth Street, Lichfield (1218411)", National Heritage List for England
- Historic England, "Cathedral View, Lichfield (1187348)", National Heritage List for England
- Historic England, "Law monument by churchyard entrance to north-east of Church of St Michael, Lichfield (1187745)", National Heritage List for England
- Historic England, "The Palace Cottage and attached former stables, Lichfield (1218808)", National Heritage List for England
- Historic England, "Fountain, Museum Gardens, Lichfield (1209619)", National Heritage List for England
- Historic England, "Engine House at Sandfields Pumping Station, Lichfield (1187742)", National Heritage List for England
- Historic England, "Lamp post to north side of West Front of Cathedral, Lichfield (1291786)", National Heritage List for England
- Historic England, "Lamp post to south side of West Front of Cathedral, Lichfield (1194874)", National Heritage List for England
- Historic England, "Beacon School including detached block immediately south west, Museum Gardens, Lichfield (1334929)", National Heritage List for England
- Historic England, "Boswell Statue, Lichfield (1187726)", National Heritage List for England
- Historic England, "Edward VII Statue, Museum Gardens, Lichfield (1298739)", National Heritage List for England
- Historic England, "John Smith Statue, Museum Gardens, Lichfield (1187361)", National Heritage List for England
- Historic England, "Lichfield War Memorial, Garden Walls, Balustrades and Gate with Gate Piers, Lichfield (1187733)", National Heritage List for England
- Historic England, "K6 telephone kiosk by garden wall of No. 20 St John Street, Lichfield (1292117)", National Heritage List for England
- Historic England, "Two K6 telephone kiosks immediately to north-west of Corn Exchange, Lichfield (1187747)", National Heritage List for England
- Historic England, Listed Buildings
- Pevsner, Nikolaus (1974), Staffordshire, The Buildings of England, Harmondsworth: Penguin Books, ISBN 0-14-071046-9
