= List of public art in Staffordshire =

This is a list of public art in the Staffordshire county of England. This list applies only to works of public art on permanent display in an outdoor public space. For example, this does not include artworks in museums.

== Burton upon Trent ==
=== Shobnall ===
Image	Title / subject	Location and coordinates	Date	Artist / designer	Type	Material	Dimensions	Designation	Owner / administrator	Notes
More images	Michael Arthur Bass	Outside Burton Town Hall, King Edward Place, Burton upon Trent 52.807737°N 1.645503°W	1911	Frederick William Pomeroy	Statue	Bronze		Grade II listed	East Staffordshire Borough Council	

=== Burton Town Centre ===
Image	Title / subject	Location and coordinates	Date	Artist / designer	Type	Material	Dimensions	Designation	Owner / administrator	Notes
	Growing Form	Library, Burton upon Trent 52.802982°N 1.626970°W	1982	Moelwyn Merchant	Sculpture	Aluminium and granite	2.8m high		East Staffordshire Borough Council	A form intended to depict the fragility of nature.
More images	The Burton Cooper	Coopers Square shopping centre, Burton upon Trent 52.802089°N 1.632218°W	1977	James Walter Butler	Statue	bronze	1.5m high		East Staffordshire Borough Council	Was in the open air from 1977. It was moved to its current location in 1994.
More images	Burton on Trent war memorial	In a garden – Lichfield Street, Burton upon Trent 52.800441°N 1.631031°W	1922	Henry Charles Fehr	War memorial sculpture	Bronze		Grade II listed	East Staffordshire Borough Council	A war memorial of an angel with laurel wreath in one hand and a sword in the other. Was restored in the year 2000.
	Malt Shovel	Corner of High Street and New Street, Burton upon Trent 52.801162°N 1.631326°W	2001	Andy Hazell	Sculpture	Stainless steel	30ft high		East Staffordshire Borough Council	A 30ft shovel with a 9ft bottle-shaped opened in the blade
	Brewing motifs	Magnet Kitchens, Union Street, Burton upon Trent 52.802030°N 1.635268°W	1985		Brick Motif	Brick			Magnet Kitchens	People power helped to save the motif on the former Comet store in 2015
More images	Reel Ale	Worthington Way, Burton upon Trent 52.804483°N 1.631373°W	2000	Students of Burton College	Barrels sculpture				Burton & South Derbyshire College	
More images	Burton College Sculpture	Burton & South Derbyshire College, Abbey Street, Burton upon Trent 52.799904°N 1.631664°W	2003	Students and staff of Burton College	Sculpture	Stainless steel			Burton & South Derbyshire College	The Earl of Wessex opened the college building and unveiled the sculptures in 2003
More images	Burton College Bench	Burton & South Derbyshire College, Lichfield Street, Burton upon Trent 52.799989°N 1.631420°W	2003	Students and staff of Burton College	Bench	Stainless steel			Burton & South Derbyshire College	The Earl of Wessex opened the college building and unveiled the sculptures in 2003

=== The Washlands ===
Image	Title / subject	Location and coordinates	Date	Artist / designer	Type	Material	Dimensions	Designation	Owner / administrator	Notes
More images	Monumite	Near Burton Library, Burton upon Trent 52.802572°N 1.626781°W	2010	APS Masonry	Sculpture	Portland stone			East Staffordshire Borough Council	Sculpture of a jar of Marmite. Nicknamed 'Monumite'
More images	Watching the Washlands	Andressey Island, Burton upon Trent 52.802035°N 1.626529°W	1993	Hattie Coppard	Sculpture	Steel, concrete, ceramic tiles, mirror mosaic			East Staffordshire Borough Council	The sculptures resemble Indian wayside icons which guard the boundaries of villages from evil
More images	Bathtime 2-by-2	Andressey Island, Burton upon Trent 52.799540°N 1.628471°W	1995	Stuart Bastik	Sculpture	Portland stone, painted timber, stone			East Staffordshire Borough Council	It looks like a large slice of toast cut into four 'soldiers'. Has a bit of damage at the top.
More images	Saint Modwen	Andressey Island, Burton upon Trent 52.798091°N 1.628880°W	1995	John Fortnum	Statue	Steel, wood, brass			East Staffordshire Borough Council	A statue of St Modwen without limbs
More images	Land and Water	Andressey Island, Burton upon Trent 52.798717°N 1.626252°W	1994	Rosemary Terry	Sculpture	Timber, natural stone			East Staffordshire Borough Council	Sculpture of a Viking ship near the River Trent. Also known as Land and Water
More images	The Heron Bench	Andressey Island, Burton upon Trent 52.803171°N 1.623132°W	1995	Nigel Hobbins	Bench	Semi-seasoned oak, varnish			East Staffordshire Borough Council	Circular bench divided into three sections. The bench has been removed leaving only the base

=== Anglesey ===
Image	Title / subject	Location and coordinates	Date	Artist / designer	Type	Material	Dimensions	Designation	Owner / administrator	Notes
More images	Metal cowl in the shape of a goat	Clarence Street, Burton upon Trent 52.799694°N 1.642904°W	1883	Scamell & Collyer of London	Sculpture			Grade II listed	East Staffordshire Borough Council	

== Cannock ==
Image	Title / subject	Location and coordinates	Date	Artist / designer	Type	Material	Dimensions	Designation	Owner / administrator	Notes
More images	Cannock War Memorial	Market Place, Cannock 52.689129°N 2.030890°W	1923	Messrs James Beresford & Sons	War memorial	Granite and Sicilian marble	Pedestal: 4.5m high x 91 cm wide x 91 cm deep. Base: 1.5m high x 2.3m wide x 2.3m deep. Figures: Lifesize		Cannock Chase District Council	
	The Sower	Cannock Library, Manor Avenue Cannock 52.689763°N 2.033592°W	1959	A John Poole	Statue	Belgian granite	210 cm high		Cannock Chase District Council	A nude male figure in the act of sowing seeds
	Khushi (The Elephant)	Outside of Nationwide, Church Street Cannock 52.688199°N 2.029273°W	2008		Sculpture				Cannock Chase District Council	Replaced the original elephant vandalised in February 2007 (which was made in 1989). The original elephant was donated by the then WH Smith Do-it-All and was named Canumbo – a mixture of Cannock and Jumbo.
More images	Heritage	Queen's Square Island, Cannock 52.689784°N 2.027295°W	November 2004	Neil Wood	Sculpture	Steel			Cannock Chase District Council	On a roundabout of the Ring Road that celebrates the mining carried out in the Cannock Chase Coalfield.
More images	Cannock Station sculpture	Cannock Station, Lichfield Road, Cannock 52.686915°N 2.021938°W	2010	Renn & Thacker	Sculpture				West Midlands Railway	Similar sculptures at Hednesford Station and Rugeley Town Station
More images	Falcon	Falcon Point Park Plaza, Hayes Way, Cannock 52.690343°N 2.011838°W	2005	Neil Wood	Sculpture	Steel	6 metres tall			Visible from Cannock Station. It's near the A460 at Falcon Point Park Plaza. Commissioned by Pritchard Holdings

== Endon ==
Image	Title / subject	Location and coordinates	Date	Artist / designer	Type	Material	Dimensions	Designation	Owner / administrator	Notes
	Sundial	St Luke's Church, Endon 53.081455°N 2.108497°W	2014	Robert Foster		Metal				An armillary sundial commemorating the centenary in 2014 of the Great War.

== Hednesford ==
Image	Title / subject	Location and coordinates	Date	Artist / designer	Type	Material	Dimensions	Designation	Owner / administrator	Notes
More images	Hednesford Station sculpture	Hednesford Station, Market Street, Hednesford 52.710475°N 2.002206°W	2010	Renn & Thacker	Sculpture				West Midlands Railway	Similar sculptures at Cannock Station and Rugeley Town Station
More images	Davy Lamp	Market Street and Anglesey Crescent, Hednesford 52.709342°N 1.999496°W	2006		Sculpture				Cannock Chase District Council	Miners memorial with more than 3,500 named on the memorial

== Lichfield ==
=== Market Square ===
Image	Title / subject	Location and coordinates	Date	Artist / designer	Type	Material	Dimensions	Designation	Owner / administrator	Notes
More images	Dr Samuel Johnson	Market Square, Lichfield 52.683609°N 1.827775°W	1838	Richard Cockle Lucas	Statue	Ashlar	Statue: 2m high. Pedestal: 2.4m high x 1.37m x 1.37m	Grade II* listed	Lichfield City Council	
More images	James Boswell	Market Square, Lichfield 52.683894°N 1.827433°W	1908	Percy Hetherington Fitzgerald	Statue	Bronze		Grade II listed	Lichfield City Council	
More images	King George V & Queen Mary	Guildhall, Bore Street, Lichfield 52.683039°N 1.827292°W	1910	Robert Bridgeman & Sons of Lichfield	Medallion busts	Portland stone	each 60 cm in diameter	Grade II listed	Lichfield City Council	Commissioned to commemorate the mayoralty of Godfrey Benson and the accession of George V.

=== Lichfield Cathedral ===
Image	Title / subject	Location and coordinates	Date	Artist / designer	Type	Material	Dimensions	Designation	Owner / administrator	Notes
More images	Charles II	South side of Lichfield Cathedral 52.685231°N 1.829985°W	1669	William Wilson	Statue	Sandstone	3.9m high	Grade I listed	Lichfield Cathedral	Commissioned shortly after the restoration. Was near the west front from 1669. In 1877 it was moved to the North West tower. Moved to current location in 1986.
More images	Statues on the West Front of Lichfield Cathedral	West front of Lichfield Cathedral 52.685256°N 1.831096°W	1876	Robert Bridgeman, Mary Grant & Princess Louise, Duchess of Argyll	Statues	Stone		Grade I listed	Lichfield Cathedral	113 statues on the west front. Of biblical figures, Kings and Queens
More images	St Chad	Lichfield Cathedral	26 June 2021	Peter Walker	Statue	Bronze	3m tall		Lichfield Cathedral	A new statue of St Chad was commissioned by Lichfield Cathedral, and was dedicated by the 99th Bishop of Lichfield

=== Beacon Park ===
Image	Title / subject	Location and coordinates	Date	Artist / designer	Type	Material	Dimensions	Designation	Owner / administrator	Notes
More images	Captain Edward Smith	Museum Gardens, Beacon Park, Lichfield 52.683525°N 1.833129°W	1914	Kathleen Scott	Statue	bronze, on Cornish granite pedestal		Grade II listed	Lichfield City Council	
More images	Edward VII	Museum Gardens, Beacon Park, Lichfield 52.683840°N 1.832266°W	1908	Robert Bridgeman	Statue	Ashlar		Grade II listed	Lichfield City Council	
More images	Erasmus Darwin	Museum Gardens, Beacon Park, Lichfield 52.684026°N 1.832457°W	2012	Peter Walker	Statue	Bronze			Lichfield City Council	Statue unveiled on 12 December 2012. Timed to mark Darwin's 281st birthday.
More images	Chancellor Law's Fountain	Museum Gardens, Beacon Park, Lichfield 52.683691°N 1.832550°W	1871		Fountain	Ashlar & Iron		Grade II listed	Lichfield City Council	Commissioned by the Chancellor James Thomas Law
	Sailor	Lichfield Free Library and Museum, Bird Street, Lichfield 52.684155°N 1.832307°W	1905	George Frederick Bodley	Statue	Ketton stone	1.35m high		Lichfield City Council	Sailor from the Boer War (1899–1902). Given to the city by Robert Bridgeman.

=== Garden of Remembrance ===
Image	Title / subject	Location and coordinates	Date	Artist / designer	Type	Material	Dimensions	Designation	Owner / administrator	Notes
More images	Lichfield War Memorial	Garden of Remembrance – Bird Street, Lichfield 52.684319°N 1.831347°W	1920	Robert Bridgeman & Sons of Lichfield	War memorial statue	Portland stone, Ashlar and Westmoreland slate		Grade II listed	Lichfield City Council	A war memorial with a Portland stone figure of St George in the middle

== Newcastle-under-Lyme ==
Image	Title / subject	Location and coordinates	Date	Artist / designer	Type	Material	Dimensions	Designation	Owner / administrator	Notes
	Queen Victoria	Queens Gardens, Ironmarket, Newcastle-under-Lyme 53.012337°N 2.224758°W	1903	Charles Bell Birch	Statue	Bronze	4m overall	Grade II listed	Newcastle-under-Lyme District Council	The statue originally stood in Nelson Place from 1903. It was moved to Station Walk in 1963. But it was frequently vandalised there. It was later restored and was moved to Queens Gardens in 2001.
	Lady in the Park	Brampton Park, Newcastle-under-Lyme 53.016640°N 2.220224°W	2014		Statue	Bronze			Newcastle-under-Lyme District Council	Installed in 2014 to commemorate the outbreak of the First World War. Covered in snow, it was mistaken for a real lady in December 2017!

== Rocester ==
Image	Title / subject	Location and coordinates	Date	Artist / designer	Type	Material	Dimensions	Designation	Owner / administrator	Notes
	The Fossor	JCB headquarters 52.952774°N 1.842187°W	1979	Walenty Pytel	Sculpture	Steel	Height: 45 feet (14 m)			Made entirely of digger parts. The name is Latin for "digger".

== Rugeley ==
Image	Title / subject	Location and coordinates	Date	Artist / designer	Type	Material	Dimensions	Designation	Owner / administrator	Notes
More images	Memorial to the Miners	Globe Island, Rugeley 52.75818°N 1.93668°W	13 September 2015	Andy De Comym	Sculpture	Concrete	Height: 9 feet (2.7 m)			Four statues dedicated to the miners of Lea Hall and Brereton collieries. One damaged badly, when a vehicle collided with it, November 2015 As of May 2017 they all seem to be fully repaired.
More images	Commemorative Railings	Upper Brook Street, Rugeley 52.758391°N 1.936483°W	2001		Railings	Railing posts: Wrought iron, painted black; Medallions: Sheet metal, black and gold; Archway: Wrought iron, painted black	Railing posts: 1.82m high; Medallions: 1.07m high x 81 cm wide (egg shaped); Archway: 5m high		Cannock Chase District Council	Made in 1999, unveiled 2000–2001
More images	Rugeley Town Station sculpture	Rugeley Town Station, Wharf Road, Rugeley 52.754398°N 1.937218°W	2010	Renn & Thacker	Sculpture				West Midlands Railway	Similar sculptures at Hednesford Station and Cannock Station

== Stafford ==
=== Victoria Park ===
Image	Title / subject	Location and coordinates	Date	Artist / designer	Type	Material	Dimensions	Designation	Owner / administrator	Notes
More images	Staffordshire County War Memorial	Victoria Park, Stafford 52.804456°N 2.121719°W	1923	William Robert Colton, completed by L. S. Merrifield	War memorial	Bronze		Grade II listed	Stafford Borough Council	Large bronze group of a Winged Victory stands on the plinth
More images	Isaak Walton	Victoria Park, Stafford 52.804042°N 2.121146°W	2000	Peter Walker	Statue	Bronze	2.15m high x 70 cm wide x 40 cm deep		Stafford Borough Council	
	W.G. Grace (Waiting to Bowl)	Victoria Park, Stafford 52.804550°N 2.119951°W	1998	Rosemary Cripps	Statue	Fibreglass, coloured bronze	180cm high approx		Stafford Borough Council	It was part of a sculpture trail project between Stafford Borough Council and Stafford College

=== Stafford Town Centre ===
Image	Title / subject	Location and coordinates	Date	Artist / designer	Type	Material	Dimensions	Designation	Owner / administrator	Notes
More images	Stafford Borough War Memorial	Victoria Square, Stafford 52.805713°N 2.119675°W	1920	Joseph Whitehead	War memorial	Portland stone ashlar and bronze		Grade II listed	Stafford Borough Council	
	Royal coat of arms	Stafford Combined Court, Victoria Square, Stafford 52.805577°N 2.119493°W			Coat of arms	Bronze			Stafford Borough Council	
	Bear	The Bear Grill, Greengate Street, Stafford 52.806472°N 2.116864°W	1972	Kenneth Thompson	Sculpture	Wood, stained dark brown	60 cm high x 40 cm wide x 90 cm long			Replica of 1972. The original bear of 200 years old rotted away in 1970
	Sheep	Oddfellows Hall, Greengate Street, Stafford 52.805947°N 2.116574°W			Sculpture					
	Stafford College Coat of Arms and Decorative Stonework	Stafford College Tenterbanks Building, Stafford 52.805882°N 2.121424°W	1937		Sculpture	stone	Various, each around 170 cm high x 170 cm wide approx		Stafford College	
More images	Stafford Faces	Hunter's Row, Stafford 52.808787°N 2.118881°W		Glynis Owen	Sculpture	Bronze resin	height 2m			

== Stoke-on-Trent ==
=== Burslem ===
Image	Title / subject	Location and coordinates	Date	Artist / designer	Type	Material	Dimensions	Designation	Owner / administrator	Notes
More images	Sir Henry Doulton	Burslem market place 53.045448°N 2.198556°W	1991	Colin Melbourne	Statue	Bronze			Stoke-on-Trent City Council	
	Traditional industries	Woodbank Street, Burslem 53.043774°N 2.199296°W	1992	John McKenna	Relief	Brick	9m x 4.5m		Staffordshire County Council	The three panels show a coalminer, a potter and a brickmaker.
	The Mayfly Throne	Burslem Park 53.048534°N 2.190018°W	2012	Philip Hardaker and Andy Edwards	Sculpture	Steel	4m high		Stoke-on-Trent City Council	
	Roy Sproson	Port Vale F.C., Burslem 53.05063°N 2.19150°W	2012	Michael Talbot	Statue	Bronze	16ft high			Unveiled on 17 November 2012 after fundraising from fans.
More images	Lemmy	Market Place, Burslem 53.046235°N 2.197367°W	2025	Andy Edwards	Statue	Bronze	2.25 m high			The statue contains some of Lemmy's ashes.

=== Central Stoke ===
Image	Title / subject	Location and coordinates	Date	Artist / designer	Type	Material	Dimensions	Designation	Owner / administrator	Notes
More images	Josiah Wedgwood	Entrance of Stoke-on-Trent railway station 53.008198°N 2.180692°W	1863	Edward Davis	Statue	Bronze	250 cm high approx	Grade II listed	Stoke-on-Trent City Council	The statue was moved to its present position in July 2025.
More images	Colin Minton Campbell	Sainsbury's, London Road, Stoke-on-Trent 53.002127°N 2.186655°W	1887	Thomas Brock	Statue	Bronze	2.3m high		Stoke-on-Trent City Council	
	A Man Can't Fly	Leek Road, Stoke-on-Trent 53.006684°N 2.178996°W	1989	Ondre Nowakowski	Sculpture	Resin and brick			Stoke-on-Trent City Council	At a busy road junction and near Stoke railway station.
	Hand with Chronos	Stoke-on-Trent railway station 53.007017°N 2.179989°W	1990	Vincent Woropay	Sculpture	Bronze and stone	1.6m high x 1.2m x 0.8m			Commissioned for the 1990 Gateshead Garden Festival, later moved to Stoke station.
	St Peter's Community Mosaic	Stoke Minster, Stoke-upon-Trent 53°0.2386′N 2°10.9056′W	2000	Philip Hardaker	Street furniture	concrete, blue brick, slate, ceramic and mosaic	1.50m high x 1.80m x 0.95m; plinth: 0.25m high x 1.80m x 0.95m		Stoke-on-Trent City Council	Made with help from local school children.
More images	Sir Stanley Matthews	Bet365 Stadium, Stoke-on-Trent 52.989553°N 2.177120°W	2001	Julian Jeffrey, Carl Payne & Andrew Edwards	Sculpture	Bronze	Figures: 2.75m high		Stoke City Football Club	Three statues that depict Stanley Matthews at different stages of his career.
More images	Another Gift	Kingsway, Stoke 53.004289°N 2.182134°W	2005	Liz Lemon	Sculpture	Stainless steel	5m high		Stoke-on-Trent City Council	
	Ribbons of Light	Glebe Street Bridge, Stoke-upon-Trent 53°0.3520′N 2°10.8524′W	2008	Liz Lemon	Sculpture	Stainless steel			Stoke-on-Trent City Council	Under Glebe Street Bridge, a reinterpretation of the Staffordshire knot.

=== Etruria ===
Image	Title / subject	Location and coordinates	Date	Artist / designer	Type	Material	Dimensions	Designation	Owner / administrator	Notes
More images	James Brindley	Etruria Junction, Etruria, Stoke-on-Trent 53.019442°N 2.192226°W	1990	Colin Melbourne	Statue	Bronze	Lifesize		Stoke-on-Trent City Council	Near the junction of the Caldon Canal with the Trent and Mersey Canal
	Josiah Wedgwood	In front of Etruria Hall, Festival Way, Etruria, Stoke-on-Trent 53.02622°N 2.19503°W	1986	Vincent Woropay	Sculpture	Brick	10ft high		Stoke-on-Trent City Council	Originally at Stoke-on-Trent Garden Festival, 1986. In 2009 the statue was moved near Wedgwood's home Etruria Hall. Accidentally destroyed by contractors during a road widening project February 2023. The restored sculpture, now situated in front of Etruria Hall, was unveiled on 26 October 2025.
More images	John Baskeyfield	Festival Park, Etruria, Stoke-on-Trent 53.030903°N 2.190643°W	1996	Steven Whyte and Michael Talbot	Statue	Bronze and brick	4m high x 2.5m x 3m		Stoke-on-Trent City Council	Baskeyfield, born in Burslem, was posthumously awarded the Victoria Cross after the Battle of Arnhem.
	The Pace of Recovery	Festival Park, Etruria, Stoke-on-Trent 53.026219°N 2.192878°W	1994	Francis Gomila	Sculpture	Stainless steel				A swan rises into the air. The location was formerly the site of Shelton Bar steelworks.
More images	Privilege	Etruria Old Road, Etruria 53.021379°N 2.198035°W	2005	Denis O'Connor	Sculpture	Stainless steel	9m high		Stoke-on-Trent City Council	

=== Fenton ===
Image	Title / subject	Location and coordinates	Date	Artist / designer	Type	Material	Dimensions	Designation	Owner / administrator	Notes
	Breaking the Mould	Berryhill Fields 53.011322°N 2.141359°W	2000	Andrew McKeown	Sculpture	Concrete and corten steel				Commissioned by Groundwork UK, for a site restored after opencast mining.
	Stone Gateway	Berryhill Fields 53.008948°N 2.131372°W	2000	Peter Price	Sculpture	Stone				One of three gateways to Berryhil Fields, this one commemorating its prehistory.
	Timber Gateway	Berryhill Fields 53.010645°N 2.134512°W	2000	Anthony Hammond		Wooden panel	3.2m high x 1.1m			This gateway commemorates agriculture and early mining, and celebrates local wildlife.
	Metal Gateway	Berryhill Fields 53.012865°N 2.138163°W	2000	Phillip Hardaker	Gate	Steel and brick	3m high, on brick plinths 50 cm high			This gateway relates to recent industry in the area.

=== Hanley ===
Image	Title / subject	Location and coordinates	Date	Artist / designer	Type	Material	Dimensions	Designation	Owner / administrator	Notes
	The Spirit of Fire	Stafford Street, Hanley 53.026902°N 2.176825°W	1964	David Wynne	Sculpture	Aluminium	10.5m high		Debenhams Ltd	The man symbolises the fires that fuelled the city's industries.
More images	Sir Stanley Matthews	Market Square, Hanley, Stoke-on-Trent 53.024663°N 2.174393°W	1987	Colin Melbourne	Statue	Bronze	160 cm high approx		Stoke-on-Trent City Council	Sir Stanley Matthews was born in Hanley
	The Steel Man	Potteries Museum & Art Gallery, Broad Street, Hanley, Stoke-on-Trent 53.023146°N 2.178589°W	1974	Colin Melbourne	Statue	Stainless steel			Stoke-on-Trent City Council	The struggle of the Shelton Bar steelworkers to retain their livelihood
	Industries of the Potteries	Potteries Museum & Art Gallery, Hanley 53.0229°N 2.1781°W	1981		Relief	Coloured bricks	4m x 33m		Stoke-on-Trent City Council	Above the entrance to the museum, a long relief made from over 6000 shaped bricks.
	Reginald Mitchell	Potteries Museum & Art Gallery, Broad Street, Hanley, Stoke-on-Trent 53.023263°N 2.178299°W	1995	Colin Melbourne	Statue	Bronze			Stoke-on-Trent City Council	He was the designer of the WWII Spitfire aeroplane
More images	Mother and Child	Bethesda Gardens, Bethesda Street, Hanley 53.02311°N 2.17656°W	2004	Anthony Beetlestone	Sculpture	Stone			Stoke-on-Trent City Council	
More images	The Light of the City	Potteries Museum & Art Gallery, Hanley 53.02323°N 2.17754°W	2010	David Annand	Sculpture	Bronze on stainless steel pedestal				Celebrating the centenary of the federation of the six towns that make up Stoke-on-Trent.
More images	Arnold Bennett	Potteries Museum & Art Gallery, Bethesda Street, Hanley, Stoke-on-Trent 53.023459°N 2.177918°W	May 2017	Michael Talbot and Carl Payne	Statue	Bronze			Stoke-on-Trent City Council	The statue was commissioned by the Arnold Bennett Society, funded by the Denise Coates Foundation and gifted to the city.
More images	Unearthed	Lidice Way, Hanley 53.02326°N 2.17469°W	2013	Nicola Winstanley and Sarah Nadin	Sculpture	Steel	5.79 m high		Stoke-on-Trent City Council	The sculpture is dedicated to unearthing the city's link with Lidice.
	Tree Stories	Central Forest Park, Hanley 53.030315°N 2.175293°W	2008	Denis O'Connor	Sculpture	Metal	6.5m high		Stoke-on-Trent City Council	The branches of the tree hold the tools of miners who worked in Hanley Deep Pit nearby
	100 Years, 100 Faces	Marsh Street, Hanley 53.02648°N 2.17880°W	2025	Rob Fenton and Alastair Barnet	Mural					It shows 100 notable local people; part of Stoke-on-Trent's centenary celebrations.

=== Longton ===
Image	Title / subject	Location and coordinates	Date	Artist / designer	Type	Material	Dimensions	Designation	Owner / administrator	Notes
	Still Life	Uttoxeter Road, Longton 52.975475°N 2.096106°W	2006	Oliver Barratt	Sculpture	Painted steel	9m high x 9m x 4m		Stoke-on-Trent City Council	There are six representations of bottle kilns, for the six towns comprising Stoke-on-Trent.

=== Tunstall ===
Image	Title / subject	Location and coordinates	Date	Artist / designer	Type	Material	Dimensions	Designation	Owner / administrator	Notes
	Tunstall Shard	Scotia Road, Tunstall 53.057719°N 2.207454°W	2009	Robert Erskine	Sculpture	Stainless steel, masonry and concrete	Sculpture: 10m high x 9m x 9m. Pedestal: 0.4m high x 9m x 9m		Dransfield Properties	A magnified representation of a shard of Roman pottery, found during redevelopment.
	Golden	Site of former Goldendale Ironworks, Chatterley Valley	2015	Wolfgang Buttress	Pylon	Corten steel	21m high x 0.75m x 0.75m		Stoke-on-Trent City Council	Subtitled "The flame that never dies", referring to the flame of the Goldendale Ironworks that lit the valley.

== Tamworth ==
Image	Title / subject	Location and coordinates	Date	Artist / designer	Type	Material	Dimensions	Designation	Owner / administrator	Notes
	Sir Robert Peel	Market Street, Tamworth 52.633084°N 1.695704°W	1853	Matthew Noble	Statue	Bronze	Statue: 250 cm high approx. Pedestal: 210 cm high x 140 cm wide x 140 cm deep	Grade II listed	Tamworth Borough Council	
	Æthelflæd	Tamworth Castle, Tamworth 52.631571°N 1.698548°W	1913	E G Bramwell	Statue	Ashlar stone	1.5m high overall	Grade II listed	Tamworth Borough Council	
More images	Colin Grazier Memorial	Church Square, Tamworth		Walenty Pytel			15' high			Commemorating Graziers retrieval of the famous enigma coding machine during the Second World War. Commissioned by:-Ex-Service and civic organisations.
	10 Millennium Planet Walk sculptures	Castle Grounds		Walenty Pytel	Galvanized Steel					10 Millennium Planet Walk sculptures in the castle grounds. The sculpture trail consists of ten separate sculptures, nine of which represent planets in the Solar System, with the tenth representing the Sun. Commissioned by:-Tamworth Borough Council.
