= Statue of Edward Smith =

Statue in Lichfield to Captain of the Titanic

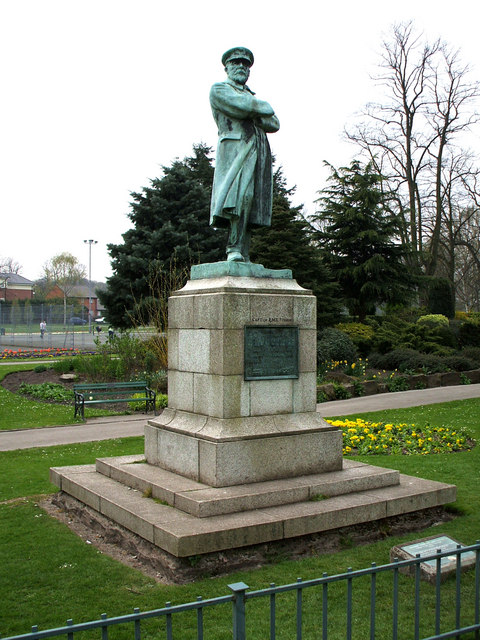
- Statue photographed before its 2010 renovation
- Artist: Kathleen Scott
- Year: 1914
- Medium: Bronze sculpture with Cornish granite pedestal
- Subject: Captain Edward Smith of the RMS Titanic
- Designation: Grade II
- Location: Museum Gardens, Beacon Park Lichfield, Staffordshire; 52.68345°N 1.83303°W

The captain of RMS Titanic, Edward Smith, is commemorated by a statue in Beacon Park, Lichfield. The sculpture was made by Kathleen Scott, the widow of Antarctic explorer Captain Robert Falcon Scott and is made of bronze, with the padestal being made of Cornish granite.

== History ==
In September 1913, the Captain Smith Memorial Committee was formed by William Perrin, the Bishop of Willesden, Lady Astor, Lord Pirrie, and the Duchess of Sutherland.

The decision was taken because Lichfield was "about half-way between Liverpool and London [and] would be convenient alike to British and American subscribers [to the memorial's costs]", and also because it was the cathedral city of the diocese in which the captain had been born. Some citizens of Lichfield signed a petition opposing the statue as Smith had no legitimate connection to the town. However, the petition was rebuffed and the unveiling went ahead as planned.

The statue of Smith in Lichfield was sculpted by Kathleen Scott and originally cost £740 (£74,000 today) raised through local and national contributions. It was unveiled by his daughter, Helen Melville, on 29 July 1914, and his widow Eleanor ended the ceremony by laying a wreath on the statue.

After the wreck of RMS Titanic was found in 1985 and interest in the ship grew, the words "Captain Smith was Captain of the Titanic" were added to its plinth. Both Hanley and Stoke-on-Trent made requests for the statue to be moved to their towns. Lichfield refused, telling Stoke that Lichfield "had been responsible for cleaning the pigeon droppings off the statue for the past seventy years."

In 2010, as part of the 'Parks for People' programme, the statue was restored and the green patina removed from its surface at a cost of £16,000.

== Description ==
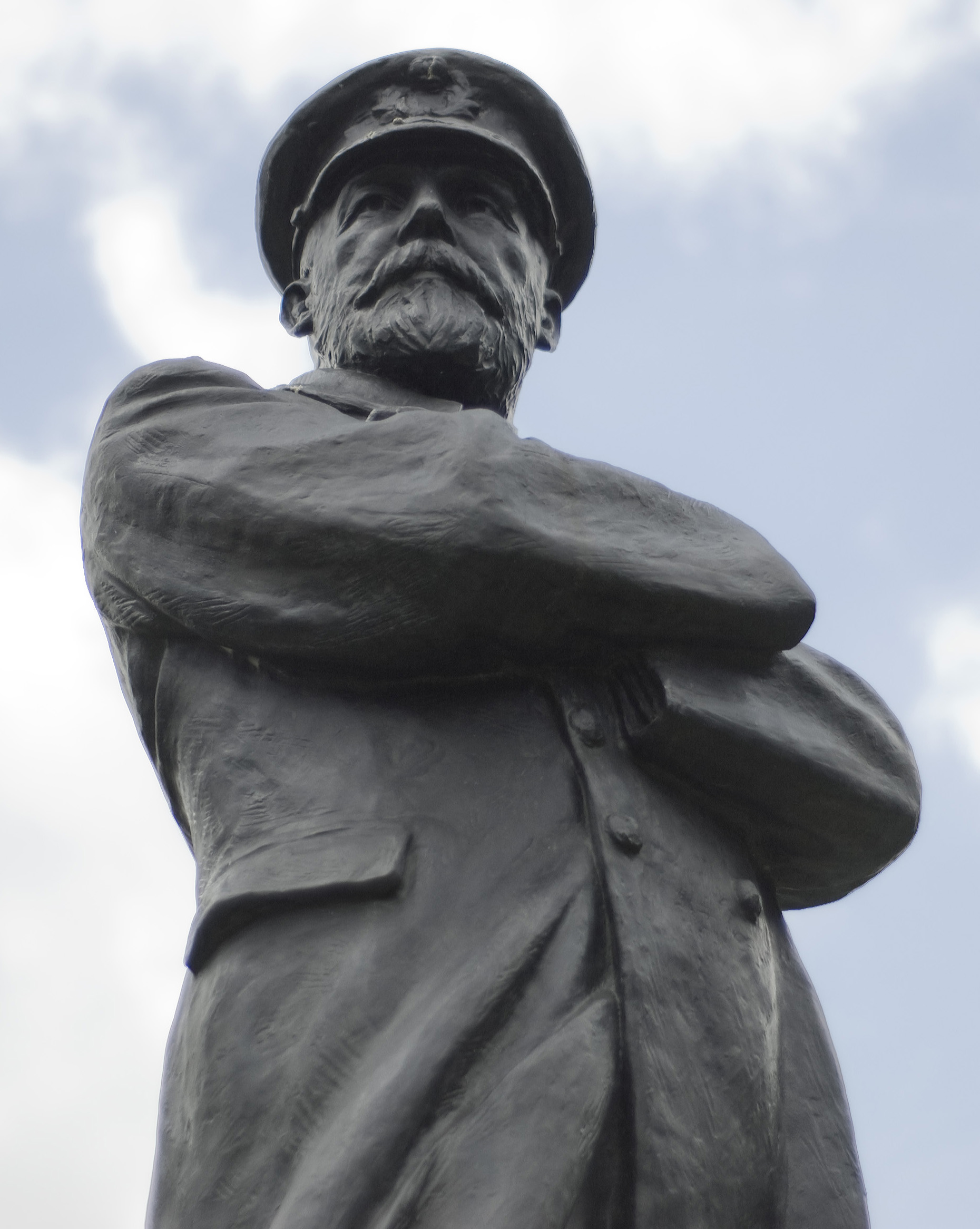
Close up of the statue, after its renovation

The statue itself is made of bronze, with the pedastel being made of Cornish granite. The monument depicts Smith, in his customary pose, looking to the west, and wearing a long coat and a captain's hat.

Notably the dedication did not mention Titanic at the time of its reveal, instead commemorating Smith for:

COMMANDER EDWARD JOHN SMITH, RD, RNR.
BORN JANUARY 27 1850
DIED APRIL 15 1912

Bequeathing to his countrymen the
Memory and Example of
A Great Heart,
A Brave Life, and
A Heroic Death.

Since then, an additional inscription was added above the plaque: "Capt. of RMS Titanic" and a further plaque was added at the base of the statue by the Lichfield District Council in 2011, providing information as to why the statue was in Lichfield.

== See also ==
- Listed buildings in Lichfield
- List of public art in Staffordshire
- Memorials and monuments to victims of the Titanic
