= Colin Melbourne =

Colin Melbourne (1928 – 5 August 2009) was an English sculptor, ceramicist, painter and academic. He is most known for several statues that stand throughout Stoke-on-Trent.

== Life ==
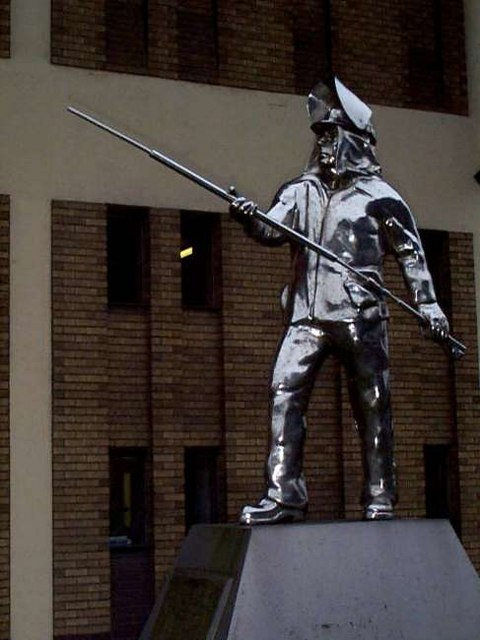
"The Steel Man" (1974)

Melbourne was born in Newcastle-under-Lyme in Staffordshire, After training as a modeller at Burslem School of Art, he was an assistant modeller at Wedgwood. He won a scholarship to the Royal College of Art, which he attended from 1949 to 1951, and afterwards created designs for companies in the Staffordshire Potteries, including Beswick Pottery and Wade Ceramics.

In the 1960s he began to teach at Stoke-on-Trent College of Art, which later merged with the North Staffordshire Polytechnic, where he was the head of the Faculty of Art and Design. He was a member of the committee for art and design at the Council for National Academic Awards. He retired from the polytechnic in 1980. Melbourne was a founder of the Sir Henry Doulton School of Sculpture in Longton, and taught there after 1980. In later years he was much occupied in painting, and his paintings were exhibited in north Staffordshire. He died at his home in Clayton, Newcastle-under-Lyme in 2009.

He was known to believe that art had a role to play in the lives of ordinary people, and that it could make a difference to society.

== Statues ==
"The Steel Man" stands outside the Potteries Museum & Art Gallery in Hanley. It was designed by Melbourne in 1974, and the stainless steel casting was by R. Goodwin and Sons. It was created to support the campaign to save Shelton Bar steelworks from closure, which eventually failed.

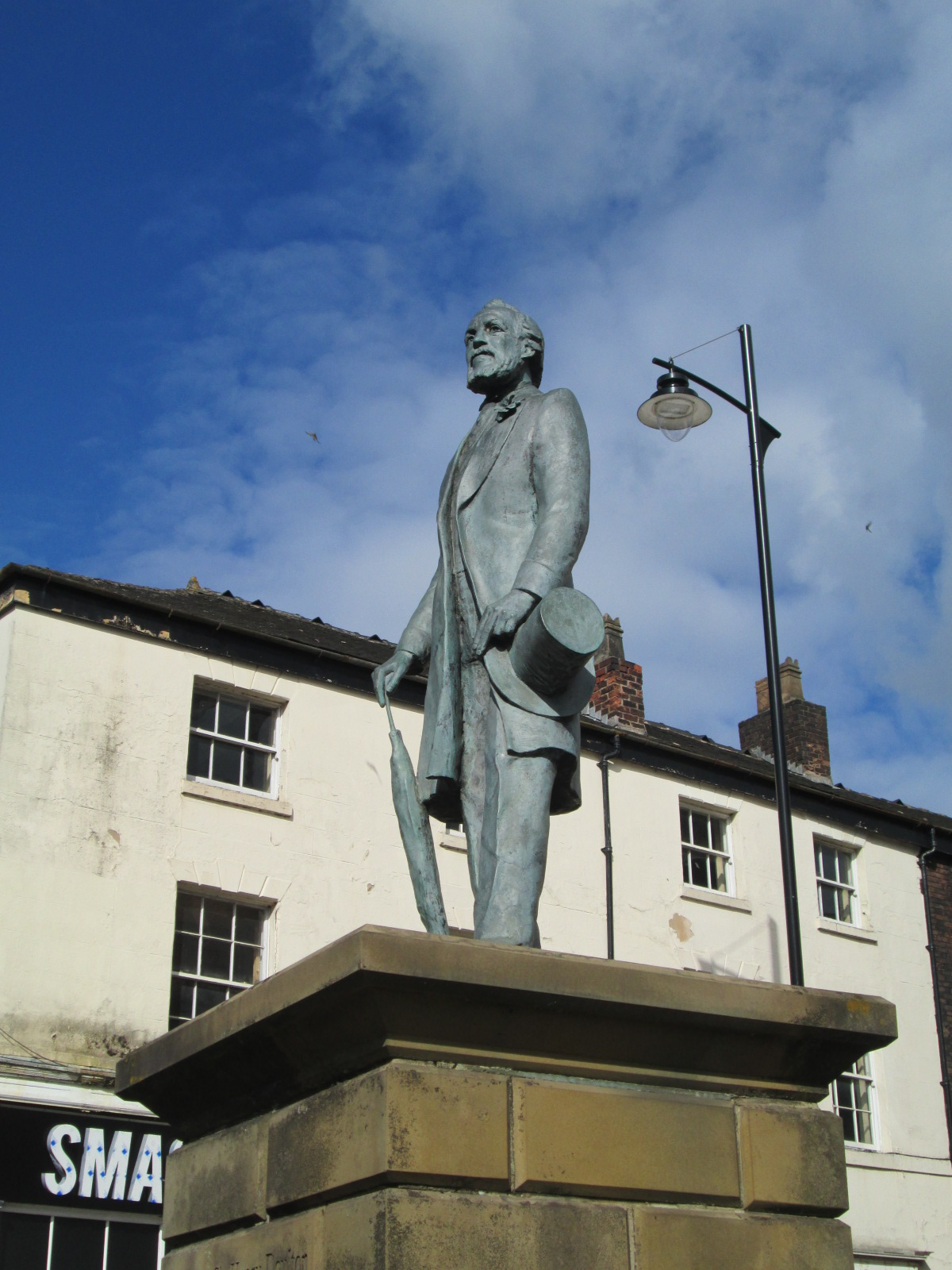
Sir Henry Doulton (1991)

Sir Stanley Matthews. The bronze statue, in Parliament Row in the centre of Hanley, was the result of a chance meeting between Melbourne and the footballer. Stanley Matthews chose the pose for the statue, and specified that it would show the kit he wore for Stoke City F.C. towards the end of his career in the 1960s. He unveiled the statue in 1987.

The bronze statue of the canal engineer James Brindley is situated in Etruria, by the Etruria Industrial Museum at the junction of the Trent and Mersey Canal and the Caldon Canal. The Brindley Committee, established to raise funds for the statue, commissioned the work. It was unveiled in 1990 by Lord Hesketh, under-secretary of State for the Environment.

Sir Henry Doulton. The bronze statue stands in Burslem market place. It was commissioned by Burslem Urban District Council, and unveiled in 1991 by Stuart Lyons, chairman of Royal Doulton.

The bronze statue of Reginald Mitchell, designer of the Spitfire aircraft, stands in Broad Street, Hanley. It was commissioned by Stoke-on-Trent City Council, and was unveiled in 1995.
