= Shelton Bar =

Steelworks in Stoke-on-Trent, England

Coordinates: 53°2′N 2°12′W

Shelton Iron, Steel & Coal Company
- Industry: Steelworks
- Headquarters: Stoke-on-Trent, Staffordshire, England

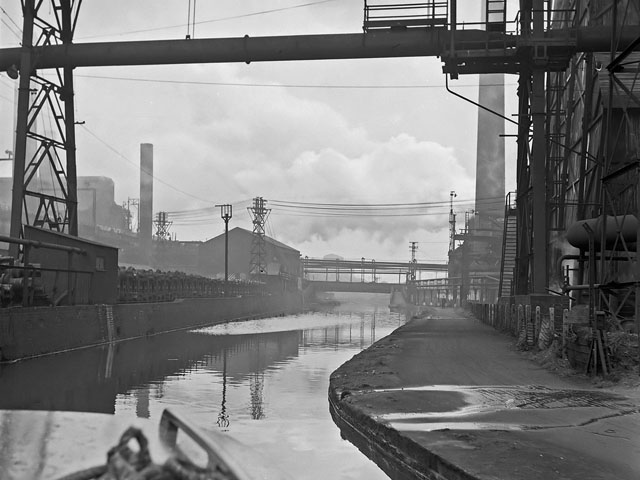
Shelton Bar Steelworks from the Trent & Mersey canal

Shelton Bar (Shelton Iron, Steel & Coal Company) was a 400-acre (1.6 km^{2}) major steelworks in the city of Stoke-on-Trent, Staffordshire, England. In its heyday, Shelton Bar employed 10,000 in the steelworks, had five coal mines, a complete railway system, and a by-products processing factory.

== The main site ==
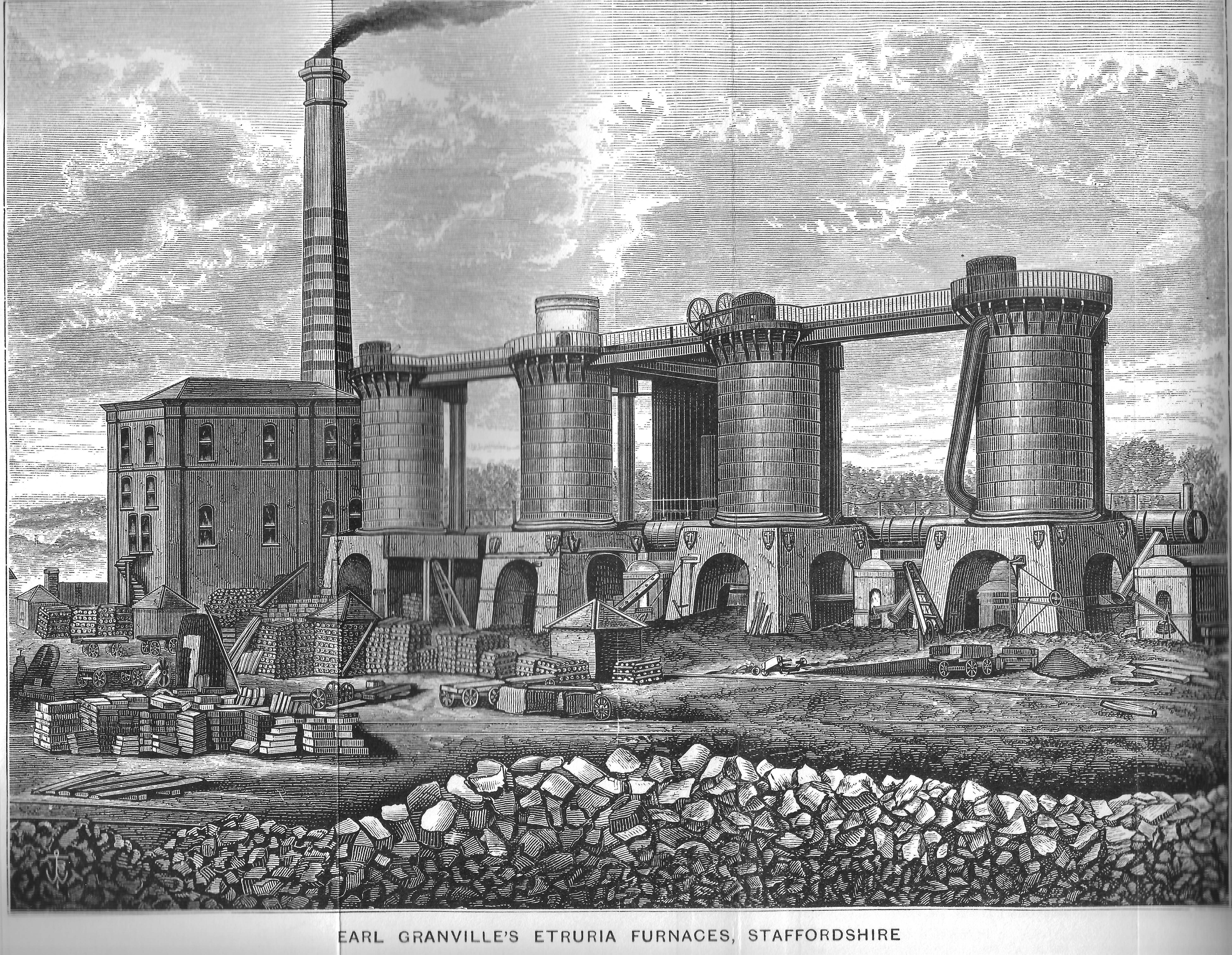
Etruria Furnaces

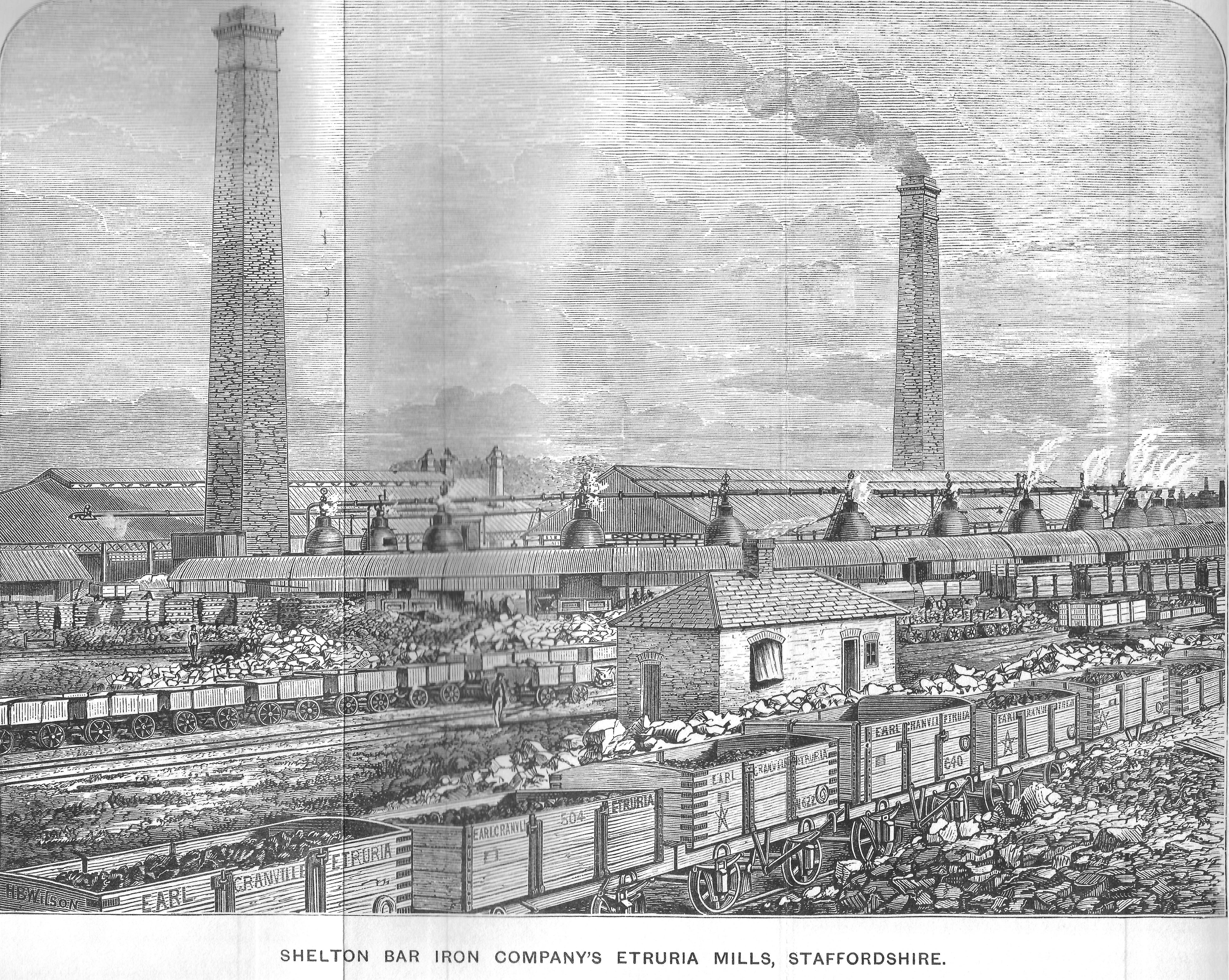
Etruria Mills

The main site began around 1830, was rapidly developed in the 1840s by the 4th Earl Granville and his managing partner William Roden MP. In 1873 there were 93 puddling furnaces, 7 mills and 8 blast furnaces with extensive iron mines and collieries. Many coal mines were sunk on the site, and railways built into the site which stretched from the western reaches of Hanley into Etruria as far as Middleport. In 1920 the company was acquired by John Summers & Sons, who developed the site into an efficient modern steelworks. During World War II it was a frequent target for German bombers as it was impossible to fully blackout the light from the huge blast furnaces. Shelton Bar came under nationalised ownership in 1951, only to be denationalised by the Conservative government in 1953. The works was re-nationalised again in 1967 by the Labour Party and the main works was closed in 1978, after which the eastern 200 acres (0.81 km^{2}) of the site was reclaimed for the 1986 National Garden Festival site, the Stoke-on-Trent Garden Festival.

== The rolling mill site ==
Shelton Works steel rolling mill was opened in 1964 as the world's first continuous cast production mill, and it remained fully operational during and after the Garden Festival, being on the western side of the Trent and Mersey Canal a few hundred yards from Middleport. It was closed by Corus in June 2000. The half-mile long building was torn down in early 2005, then used as a major supplies depot in the £8-billion upgrade of the West Coast Main Line railway that runs alongside the site. The rolling mill site is now being rectified ahead of a major £120m regeneration by St. Modwen. A pre-Roman British cemetery probably lies under the site, since funeral urns were found when the foundations were dug.

As of 2005, there are now no steelworks or mines left in the city.

When Shelton (new works) was constructed in 1964 it used a Swedish design Kaldo converter process which was very quick but the high cost of the refractories that had to be used and the life of them made it very expensive to operate.

The main rolling mill was made by the German Company "Demag" introducing a quick order change system, where the Rolling machines (that weighed around 200 tonnes) were lifted out of the ground put in a dummy pit and the next machine for the next order was dropped in. This method reduced the time to change from one order to another down from around 8 hours to about 30 minutes.

Shelton was a pioneer in the research of "spray steel" where iron was blown through a nozzle and oxygen added the result was steel. However the idea was scrapped due to the high amounts of slag that was produced. Shelton also experimented with linear motors to move the steel through the mill and constructed a magnetic stacking machine.

Shelton produced the first "Guide Rail" (a "T" section) in the form of a "H" in a Universal beam housing and were able to snap them in half to make the "T". In this way they doubled production and the product cooled evenly preventing warping. They also perfected a very high quality flat section again in the Universal Housing and became known as "Shelton Flats".

== In art ==
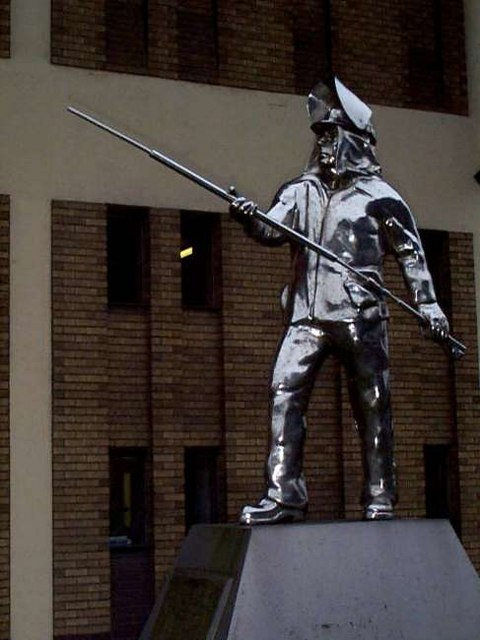
"The Steel Man", stainless steel sculpture by Colin Melbourne

The industrial landscapes of Shelton Bar were depicted in art by Arthur Berry, in poetry by Charles Tomlinson and in fiction by Arnold Bennett. The human side of steelmaking was depicted on the stage and BBC TV as "The Fight for Shelton Bar" (1973). In fiction, the landscape of Shelton Bar was the setting of the short story "The Cone" by H. G. Wells, who had lived nearby. It's believed that Wells also found inspiration for The War of the Worlds there: he wrote in a letter to a friend from the area that "the district made an immense impression on me." The inspiration for some of his descriptions in it is thought to have come from his short time spent there, seeing the iron foundry furnaces burn over the city, shooting huge red light into the skies.

The sculptor Colin Melbourne created "The Steel Man" in 1974, in support of the campaign to save Shelton Bar.

== Bibliography ==
- Company timeline
