= Berryhill Fields =

Nature reserve in Stoke-on-Trent, UK

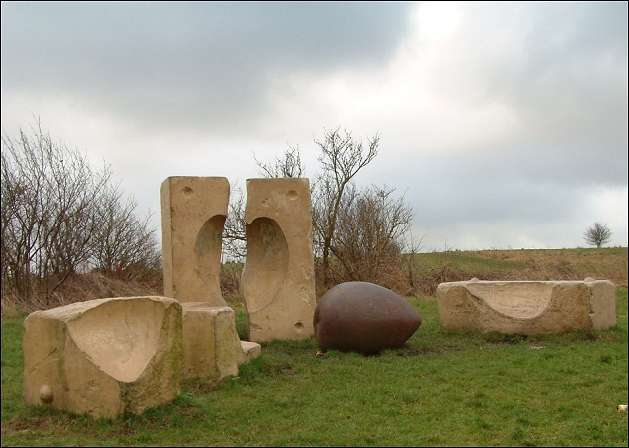
- Breaking the Mould, sculpture by Andrew McKeown, installed in 2000. Commissioned by Groundwork UK.

- Location within Staffordshire
- Interactive map of Berryhill Fields
- Location: Stoke-on-Trent
- OS grid: SJ 908 458
- Coordinates: 53.0092°N 2.1402°W
- Area: 63.31 hectares (156.4 acres)
- Operator: Stoke-on-Trent City Council
- Designation: Local nature reserve
- Website: Berryhill Fields

Berryhill Fields is an area of grassland in the heart of Stoke-on-Trent in England, between the housing estates of Bentilee and Berryhill and the town of Fenton. It is a local nature reserve, owned and managed by Stoke-on-Trent City Council. Its area is 63.31 hectares (156.4 acres).

== History ==
The earthwork remains of a medieval manor house (Lawn Farm moated site, a scheduled monument) are within the area. It is thought to have once been the manor house of Fenton Vivian (that later became the town of Fenton), named after Vivian of Standon, lord of the manor in the 13th century.

In the first half of the 20th century there were two coal mines on the present Berryhill Fields, and small scale farming. The land was acquired for housing in the 1950s but no building took place. A subsequent plan for open-cast mining was turned down in 1994.

=== Regeneration ===
The site was the subject of a £2 million regeneration project for the Millennium, managed by Groundwork Stoke, as part of the nationwide Changing Places programme, that included creating new pathways to facilitate access for people with disabilities, creating a number of art features, and funding a series of archaeological excavations on the site of the 13th-century moated manor house sited on the fields.
