= Denis O'Connor (British-Irish sculptor) =

Irish sculptor

Denis O'Connor is an Irish sculptor and teacher, based in England since 1983. He has created many public sculptures by commission, which stand in locations in Britain and Ireland.

== Life ==
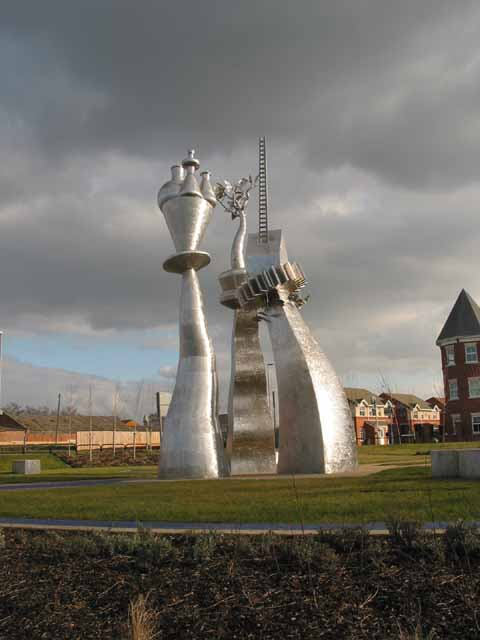
"Privilege" (2005) in Stoke-on-Trent

O'Connor was born in Dublin, and was brought up in Millstreet in County Cork. He studied at Limerick School of Art and Design from 1978 to 1982, and completed his master's degree at Birmingham Polytechnic in England in 1983. He was a visiting tutor at Saint Martin's School of Art in London from 1986 to 1988; he was a part-time lecturer in fine art at the Derby School of Art from 1988 to 1990. He has held a number of residencies, including with Jaguar Cars, the National Trust at Ilam Park and Rolls-Royce Heritage Trust in Derby. In recent years he has worked from a studio at his home in Wirksworth, Derbyshire.

== Works ==
O'Connor has said "My interest in 'making' was inspired by watching my father, who was a shoe-maker.... I believe that it is only possible for artists to express a narrative through sculpture by being fully engaged with the entire process of making". His sculptures include the following:

"Privilege" was commissioned by Stoke-on-Trent City Council and stands in Etruria, in Stoke-on-Trent, Staffordshire; the stainless steel sculpture is 9 metres (30 ft) high and was installed in 2005. It shows pottery and a gear wheel, representing past industry in the area, and a tree and ladder, representing future aspirations.

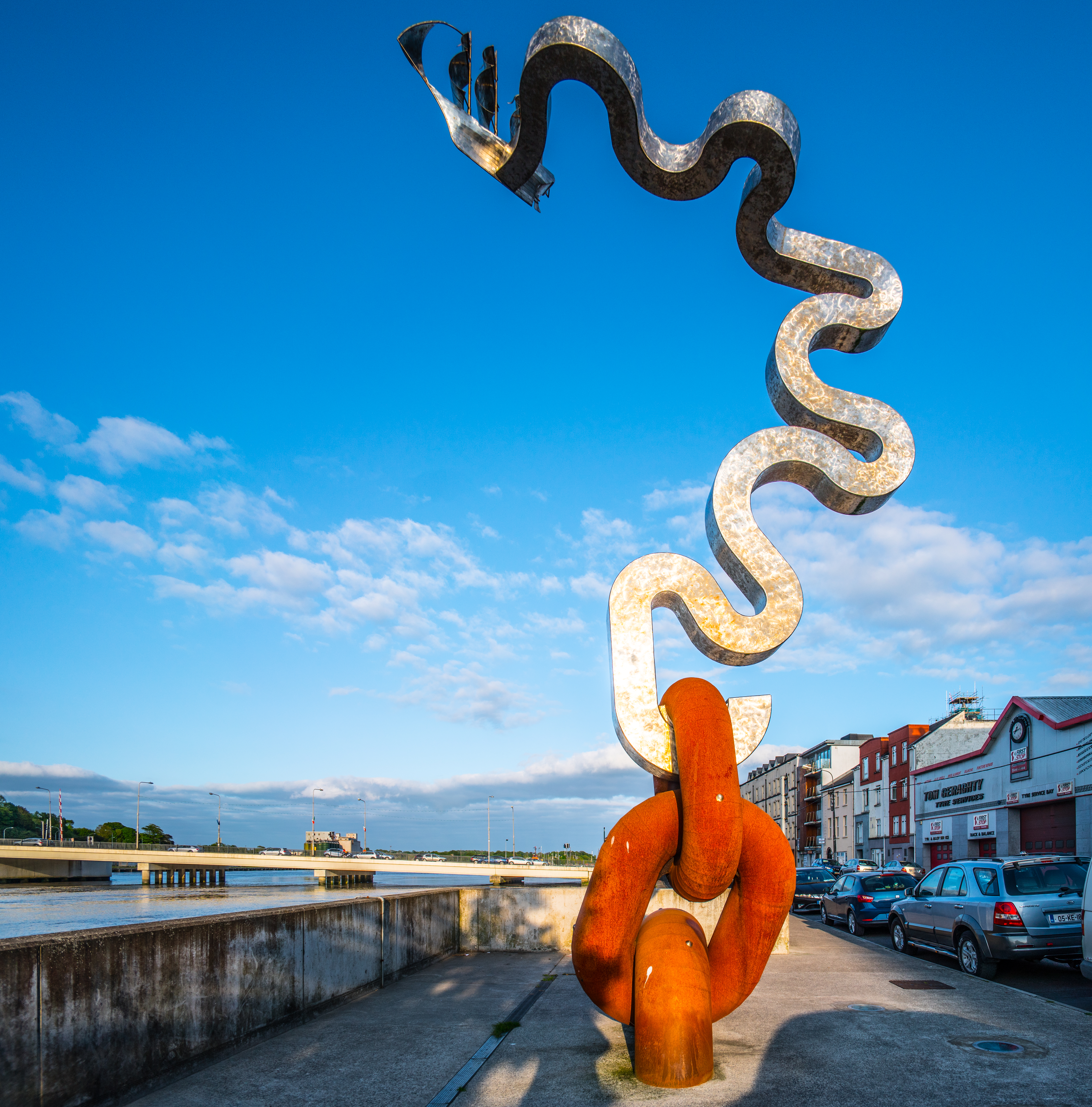
"Last Journey" (2010) in Waterford

"Last Journey" ("Turas Set Caithe") was installed on Grattan Quay in Waterford, Ireland, in 2010. It is 8 metres (26 ft) high; it shows a tall ship above a twisting line of stainless steel, which stands a base of chain links of corten steel. The sculpture refers to Waterford's shipbuilding tradition, its history as a departure point for emigrants, and to The Three Sisters, the three rivers flowing into Waterford, represented by the twisting steel.

"Sweet Water Arch", in Stranmillis, in Belfast, Northern Ireland, was commissioned by Belfast City Council, and was unveiled by the Lord Mayor of Belfast Naomi Long in 2009. It is of stainless steel and is 4 metres (13 ft) high. The title comes from the Irish name for the area, "An Srúthan Milís", meaning "sweet stream". There are references in the sculpture to features of the area including the River Lagan and the architecture of Stranmillis College.

"Football Stories" was installed in 2010 in Derby at the site of the Baseball Ground, the former home of Derby County F.C. It was commissioned during redevelopment of the area. The steel sculpture shows three silhouette footballers, on a twisting platform above an arch.
