= Monumite =

Outdoor sculpture in Burton upon Trent, England

Coordinates: 52°48′07.3″N 1°38′37.0″W

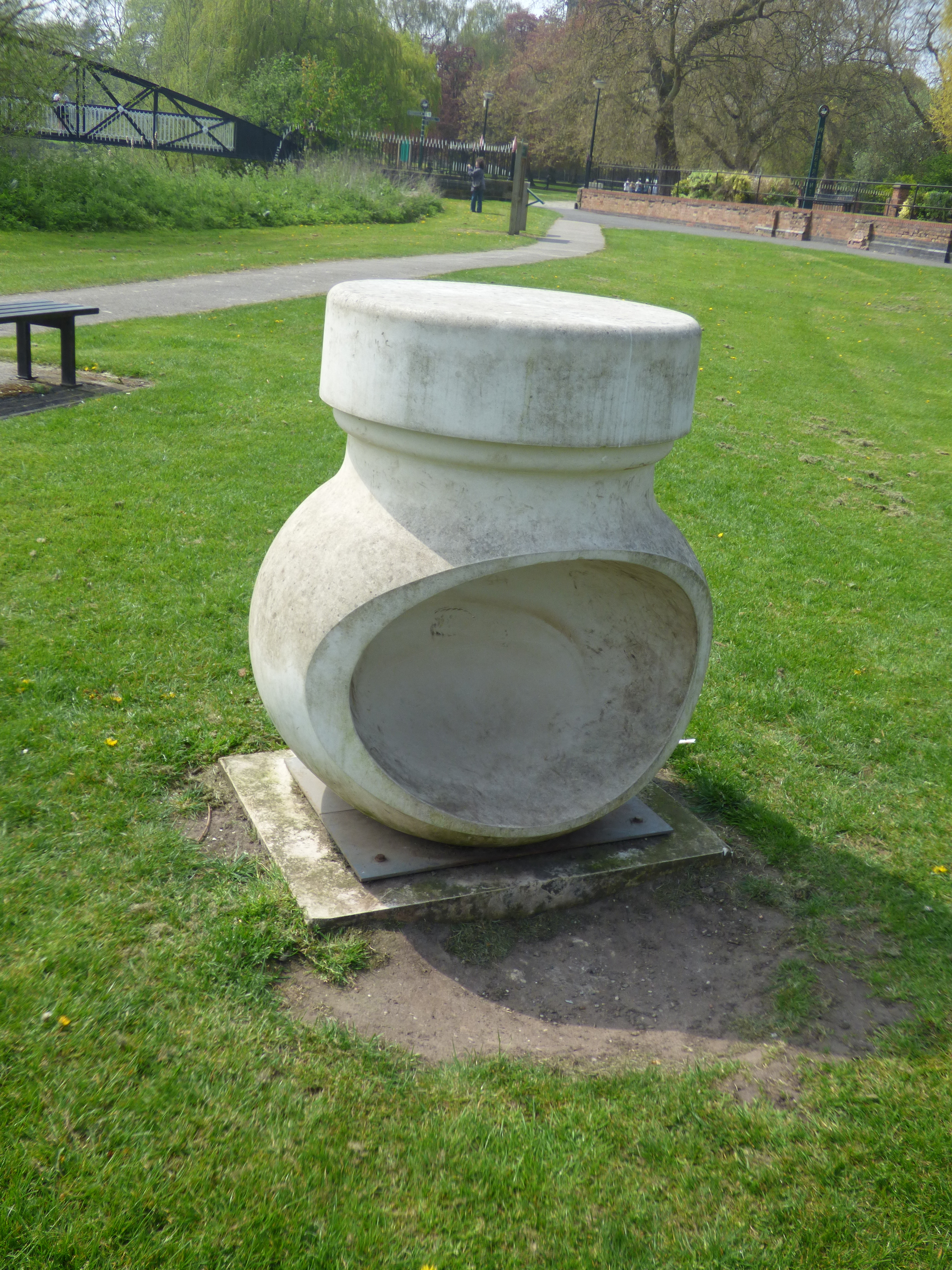
Front view of Monumite in its original location

Monumite is a sculpture in Burton upon Trent, Staffordshire, England, depicting a jar of Marmite spread. Marmite has been manufactured in the town since 1902 and the sculpture was erected in 2010 as part of an advertising campaign. Marmite owner Unilever marketed the sculpture as a "shrine" for lovers of marmite to "congregate and worship" at.

== Background ==
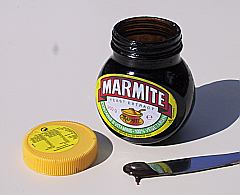
A jar of marmite

Marmite is a British savoury food spread based on yeast extract, often consumed on toast. Since 1902 it has been manufactured in Burton upon Trent using by-products from the town's breweries. A distinctive shaped glass jar was introduced in 1920. Since the 1990s the product has been marketed under a "love it or hate it" catchphrase. In 2000 the product came into the ownership of multinational Unilever. It remains in production at a factory in Burton with an output of around 25 million jars per year.

To coincide with the run-in to the 6 May 2010 United Kingdom general election, Unilever ran an advertising campaign featuring the competing Love and Hate parties. A poll at the end of the campaign on 29 April resulted in victory for the Love Party. One of the party's manifesto pledges had been to establish "a Marmite shrine for lovers across the world to congregate and worship". As part of the advertising campaign Unilever decided to commission a monument to fulfil that pledge.

== Sculpture ==
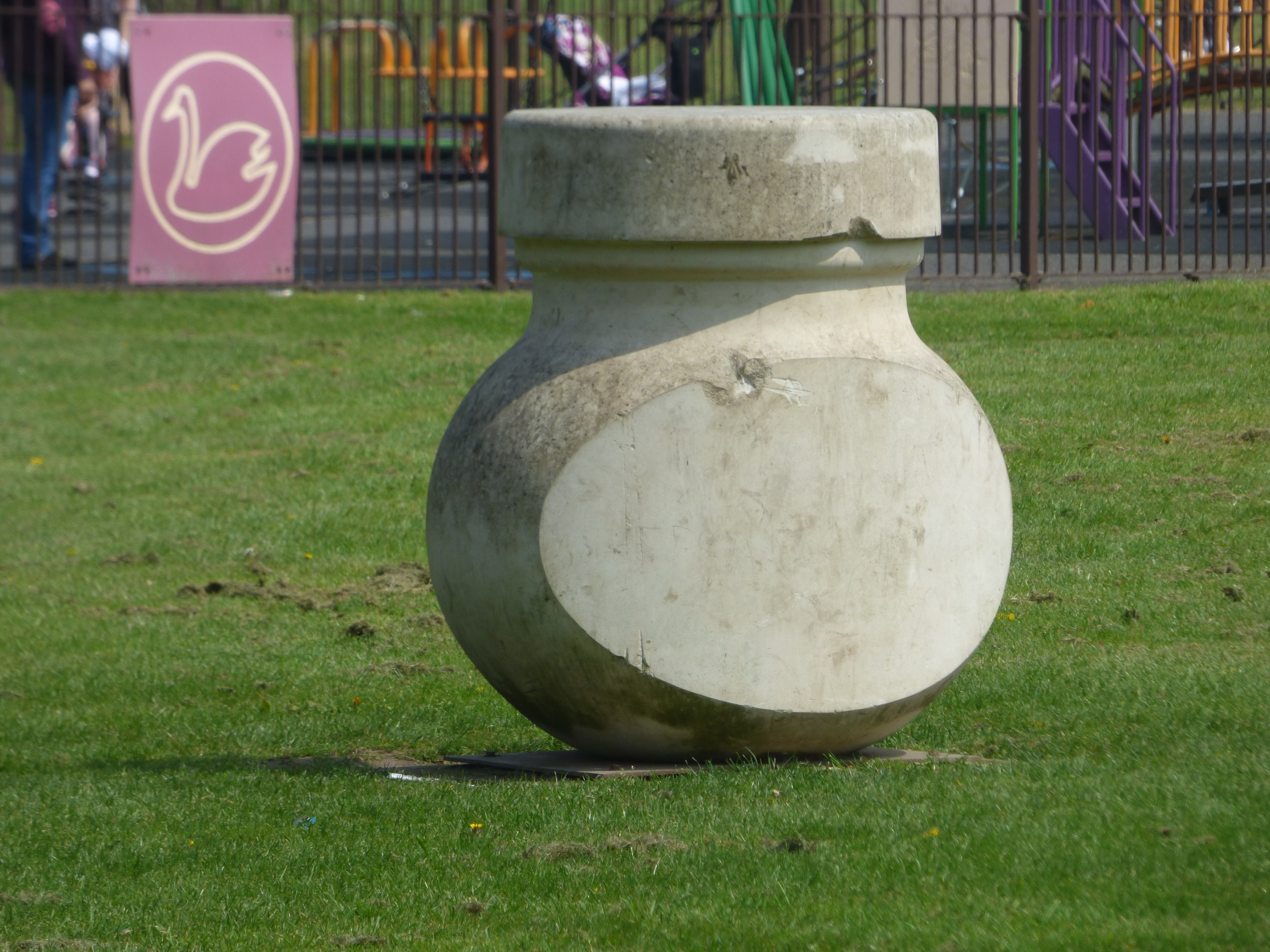
Rear view of Monumite in its original location

Unilever commissioned the work through creative agency Spark. A £15,000 budget was allocated and a design carried out by JAM brand consultants. The design is a simple rendering of the marmite jar in Portland stone, with an oval-shaped hollow where the label would be. The stonework was commissioned from Axtell Perry & Symm (APS) of Oxford. The order helped APS, founded in 1815, to recover from near-closure in December 2009, during which 12 of its 20 staff were laid off. A 3D model provided by JAM was scanned and the carving was carried out over a period of 71 hours by a machine.

The sculpture was named Monumite, a portmanteau of "monument" and "Marmite" following a public competition; the name had been suggested independently by two entrants. On 18 October 2010 the sculpture was unveiled at a site on the Washlands that overlooks the River Trent. Burton's library is close by. Monumite includes Bluetooth connectivity allowing users to access digital content on the history of Marmite. The sculpture's lid measures 80 centimetres (31 in) in width and is intended to provide a seat for children and a platform for adults to stand on during public events. It is owned by the local authority, East Staffordshire Borough Council, and is publicly accessible.

When it was unveiled Unilever's marketing manager, said "We think the final sculpture perfectly represents and celebrates our long-standing relationship with Burton and the local area" and was intended as a "sustainable and long-term piece of public art". In their publicity Unilever encouraged people to make a "pilgrimage" to "congregate and worship" at the sculpture.

In November 2024 the monument was relocated as part of works to the Washlands. It was relocated to Evershed Way at a site that formerly held the 1995 bronze work Font by Doug Cocker, an abstract sculpture of cylindrical form intended to suggest figures holding a brewing vat; Font was controversial when installed and was criticised by local councillors.
