= Beacon Park =

Public park in the city of Lichfield, Staffordshire, in England

Coordinates: 52.684°N 1.839°W

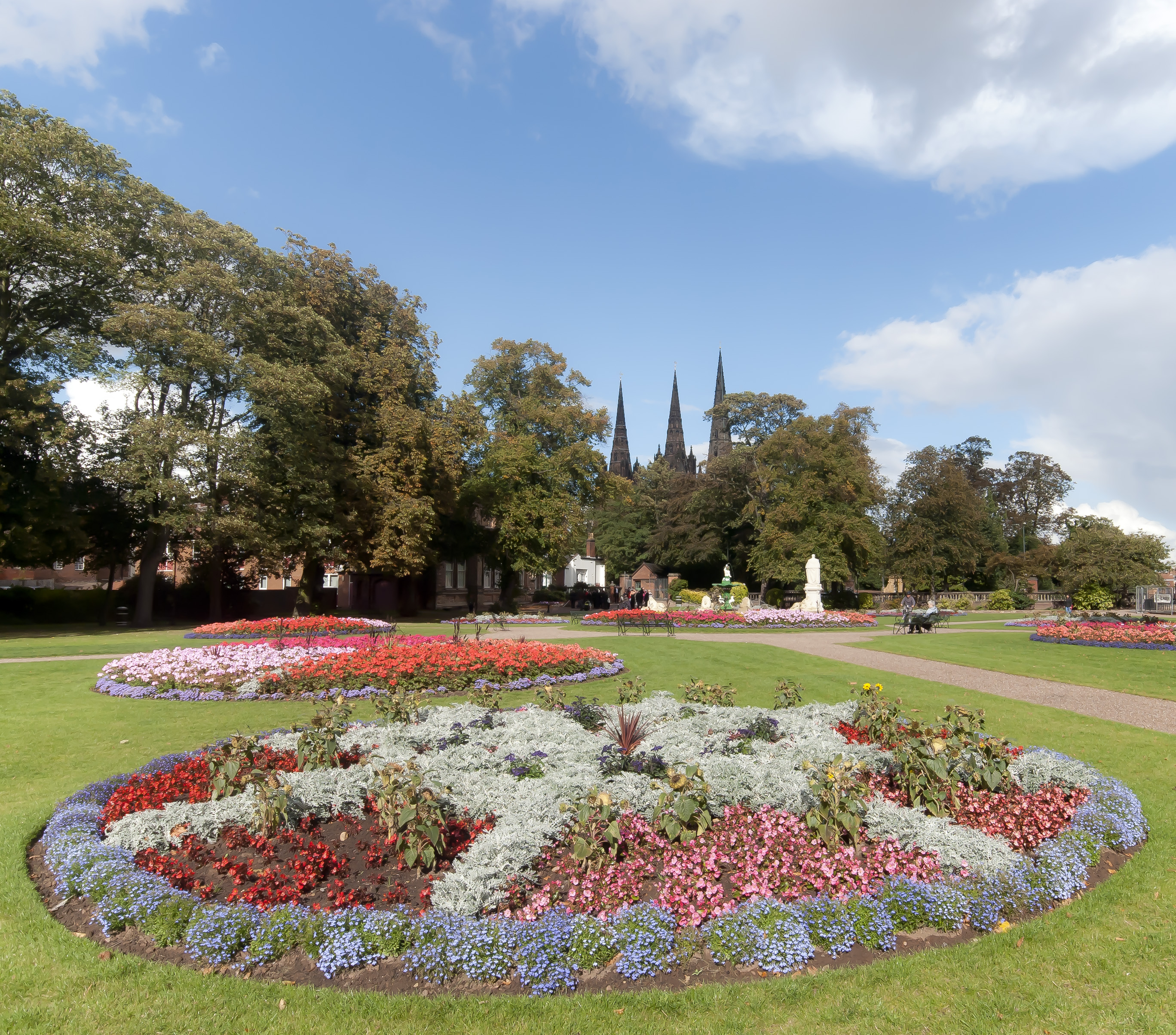
- Museum Gardens with the spires of Lichfield Cathedral in the background.
- Interactive map of Beacon Park
- Type: Public park
- Location: Lichfield, Staffordshire
- Area: 69 acres (28 ha)
- Elevation: 80 m (260 ft)
- Created: 1859
- Operator: Lichfield District Council
- Open: All year
- Awards: BALI Grand Award (2012)

Beacon Park is a green flag public park in the centre of the city of Lichfield, Staffordshire, in England. The park was created in 1859 when the Museum Gardens were laid out adjacent to the newly built Free Museum and Library. The park has since been extended in stages and now forms 69 acres (28 ha) of open parkland in the city centre. The park is in the northwest of the city centre and to the west of the Cathedral Close across the road from the Garden of Remembrance. In 2024, the park was voted as one of the best 10 green flag parks in the United Kingdom.

The majority of the park was originally waterlogged marshland and a lake covered the area of what is now the Museum Gardens. The land was drained in the early 19th century and the Museum Gardens were raised with silt dredged from Minster Pool. The large northern area of the park once formed the land and gardens of Beacon House. This land was incorporated into the park when the owner of Beacon House, Colonel Swinfen Broun, donated the land after his death.

The park has many sporting and recreational facilities for use by the public, including an 18-hole golf course, football pitches, tennis courts and bowling greens. The park also hosts a wide range of events throughout the year including the Lichfield Bower and The Lichfield Festival. The park is home to many monuments, most notably a large bronze statue of Captain Smith of the RMS Titanic.

== History ==
=== Early history ===
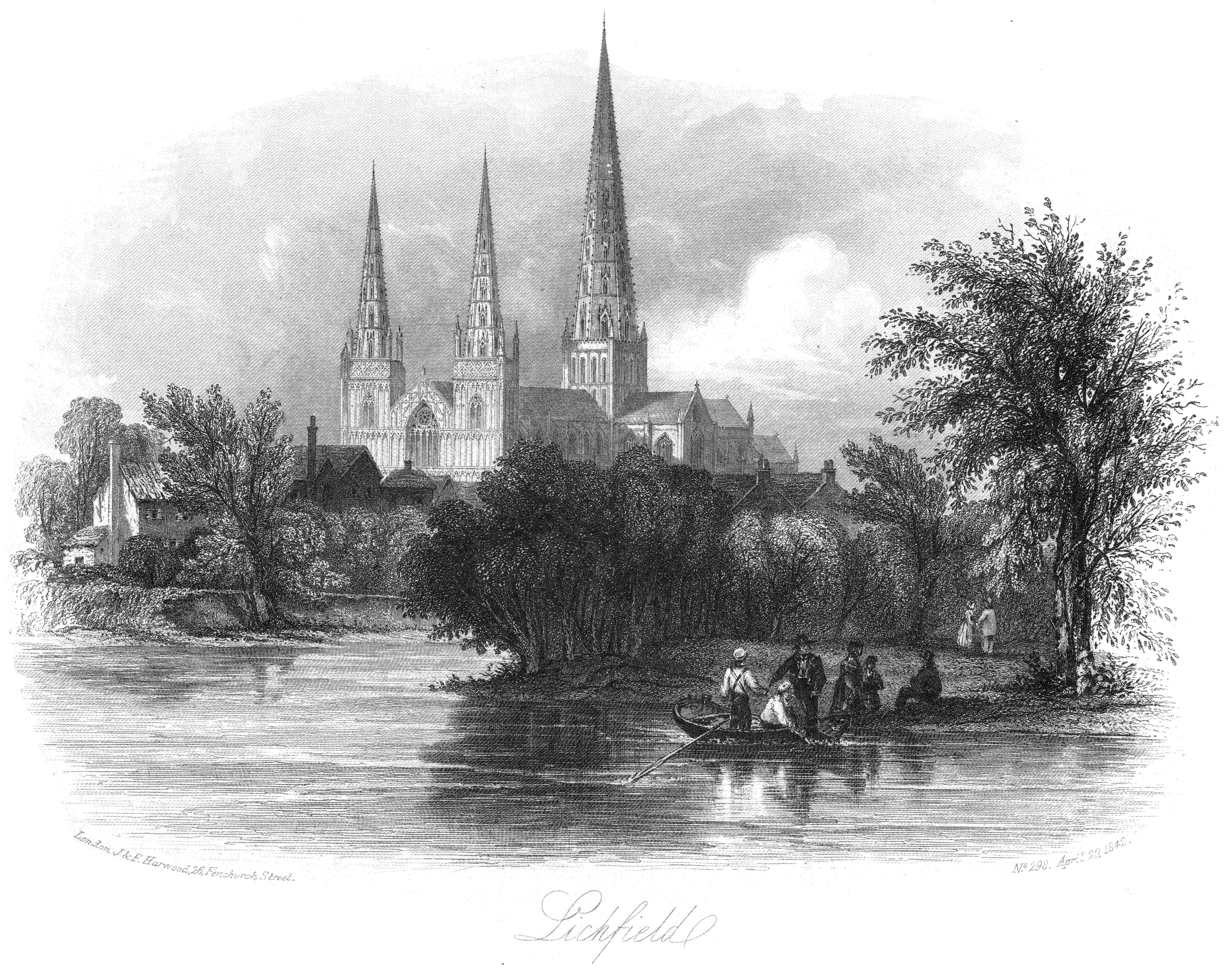
Bishops Fish Pool in 1842, over the location of the present Museum Gardens.

Beacon Park stands on land which was originally low lying, poorly drained pasture alongside the Leamonsley Brook. The Museum Gardens and Recreation Grounds were the site of Bishops Fish Pool (sometimes known as Upper Pool). The pool was created when a causeway was built on Beacon Street in the 14th century separating it from Minster Pool. The waterlogged marshland surrounding Bishops Fish Pool became known as 'The Moggs' from the 15th century and later 'Swan Moggs'.

Swans were kept by the Bishops of Lichfield on Bishops Fish Pool from the early 14th century. Special pens and nesting areas were constructed. Ownership of the birds passed to the Lichfield Corporation from 1548. In 1704 the lease owner of 'Swan Moggs' was required to allow the swans make their nests there. In this area today we get the street names Swan Road and Swan Mews reflecting the history of the land use.

The land of the wider Beacon Park was used for agriculture from at least the 13th century to the 19th century. This past use is visible today in street names with Townfields south of the park and north of the park there are records of a Shaw field in 1336 which is now Shaw Lane.

=== 19th century ===
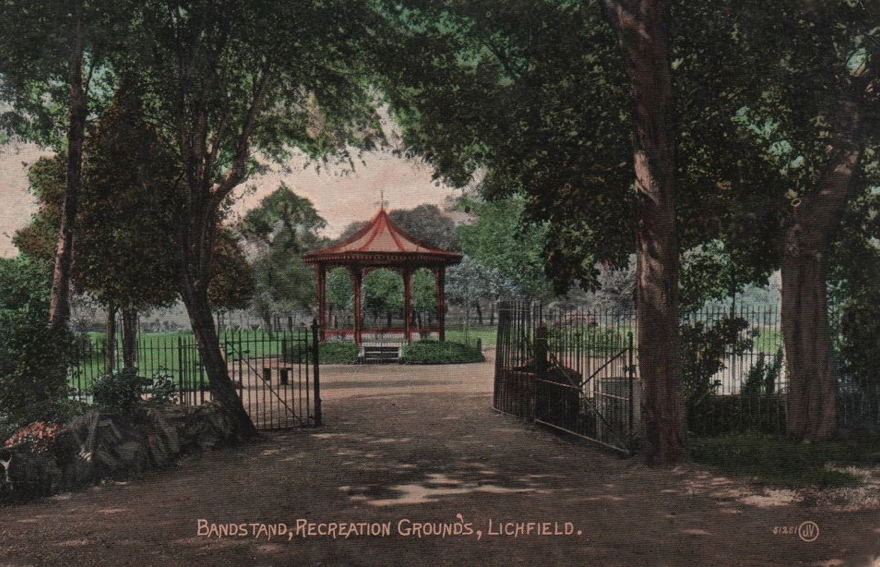
The bandstand, which was once at the southern end of the Museum Gardens.

As the city water supply from Aldershawe was diminishing in the early 19th century, money was spent diverting surface waters from 'Swan Moggs' into a common conduit. The two streams across it were diverted into underground culverts; the land was raised with silt and mud dredged from Minster Pool. The area was subsequently developed into the formal gardens of Beacon Park by the Lichfield Corporation, but paid for by the Conduit Lands Trust. The Museum Gardens were opened in 1859 to complement the new Italianate Free Library and Museum. The Recreation Grounds, opened in 1891, is the small area between the Museum Gardens and the wider Beacon Park. The central fountain was unveiled as the central focus of the Museum Gardens in 1871. A bandstand was also installed close to the junction of the Museum Gardens and Recreation Grounds, and was positioned to provide a focus for the avenue through the Museum Gardens.

The development of the wider Beacon Park is closely linked to the development of Beacon House, which was built for George Hand in 1800. The gardens and parkland were developed in stages over the nineteenth century as ownership of the estate changed. In 1826 the owner, Richard Hinckley added two wings to the house, extended the grounds and carried out extensive improvements to the landscape. Two fish ponds were dug along the valley, fed by the Leomonsley Brook, and a long ornamental approach constructed across the fields towards Walsall Road. Samuel Lipscomb Seckham acquired Beacon House and its 32 acres (13 ha) estate in 1880. He extended the parkland to cover 100 acres (40 ha) and added a terraced walk along the front; linking the house to the ponds.

=== 20th century ===
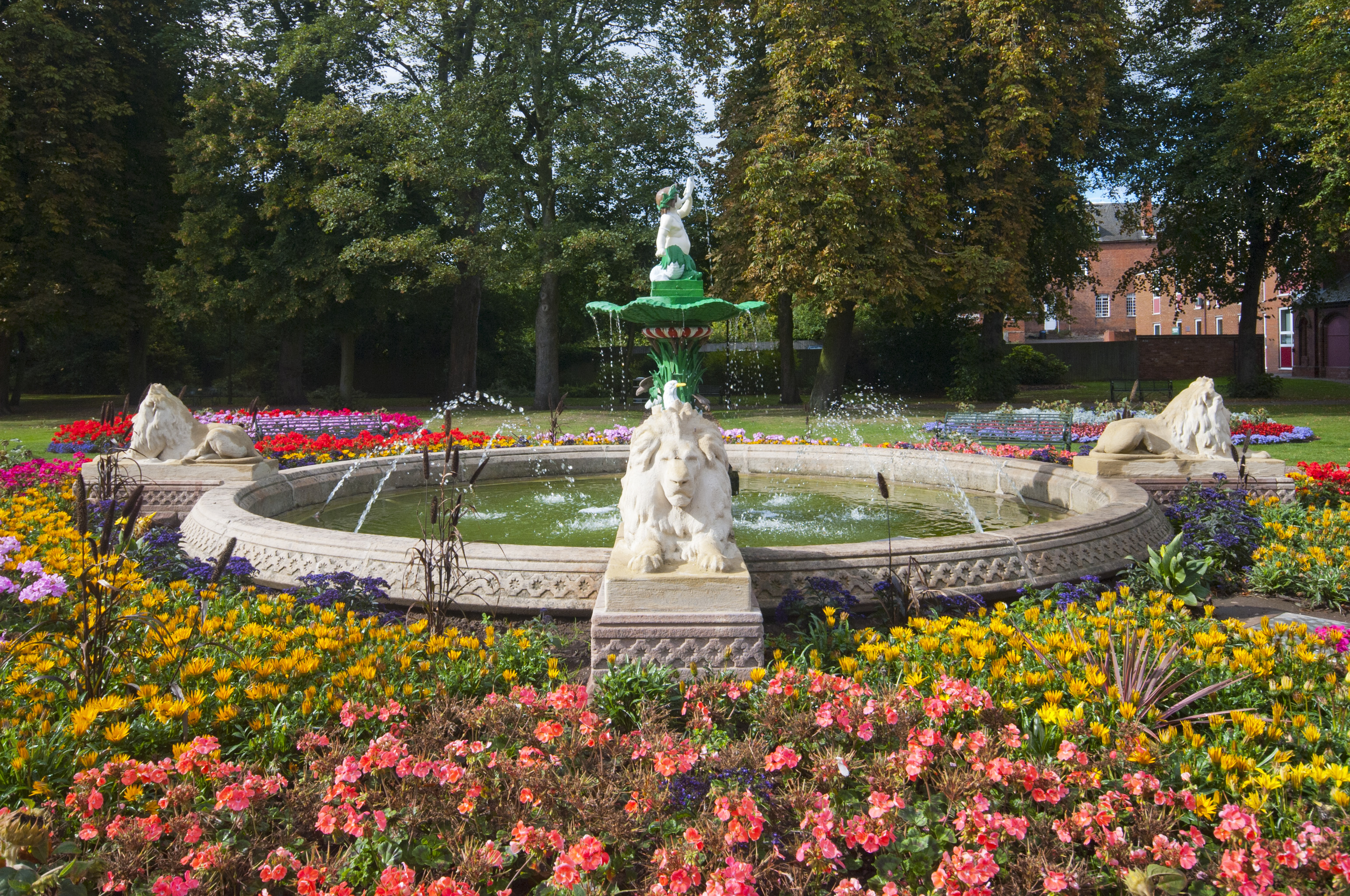
Chancellor Law's Fountain after restoration in 2011

Statues of Edward VII and Edward Smith were erected in the Museum Gardens in 1908 and 1914 respectively. During the First World War, Beacon House was sold to the War department. A Crimean War cannon and a First World War German gun were placed in the Museum Gardens after the war, only to be removed for scrap metal during the next war. After the First World War the park was the scene of much celebration with the Recreation Grounds used for athletics and the Museum Gardens for dancing. The Garden of Remembrance was laid out across Beacon Street opposite the park in 1920. The timber framed public convenience at the northeast entrance was built in 1930, partly with old materials from the portion of the Friary which was taken down in 1925 on the making of the new road.

Beacon House was used by the Royal Army Service Corps during the Second World War before being demolished by the City Council in 1964. The land on which Beacon House once stood is now a housing estate with street names Swinfen Broun Road and Seckham Road named after previous residents of the house. Colonel Swinfen Broun gifted 12 acres (4.9 ha) of the land to the park in 1943. After the land attached to Beacon House was incorporated into Beacon Park between 1943 and 1964 the park area as we know it today was complete.

Over the rest of the 20th century many recreation facilities were incorporated into the park. Parkland was levelled for football pitches in 1947. A second bowling green in the Recreation Grounds was laid out by the City Council in 1962 to join the green in the Museum Gardens laid in 1922. In 1972 the two fish ponds were reshaped and deepened to leave one pool (Beacon Pool) we see today. The golf course was laid out and opened in 1973.

=== 21st century ===
In 2009, the Heritage Lottery Fund and the Big Lottery Fund announced Beacon Park, Minster Pool and Walk and the Garden of Remembrance had been awarded a grant £3.9 million under the 'Parks for People' programme. The transformation started in 2010 and was completed in 2012 with works including a new café, refreshment kiosk, bowls and education pavilion, toilets, and new and improved play areas for children of all ages. Conservation work was carried out on the listed structures, including the statues, railings and fountain. In the Museum Gardens, the bowling green was relocated to the Recreation Grounds and in its previous location beds of flowers were planted to recreate the Victorian geometric landscaping to the gardens.

== Monuments and sculpture ==
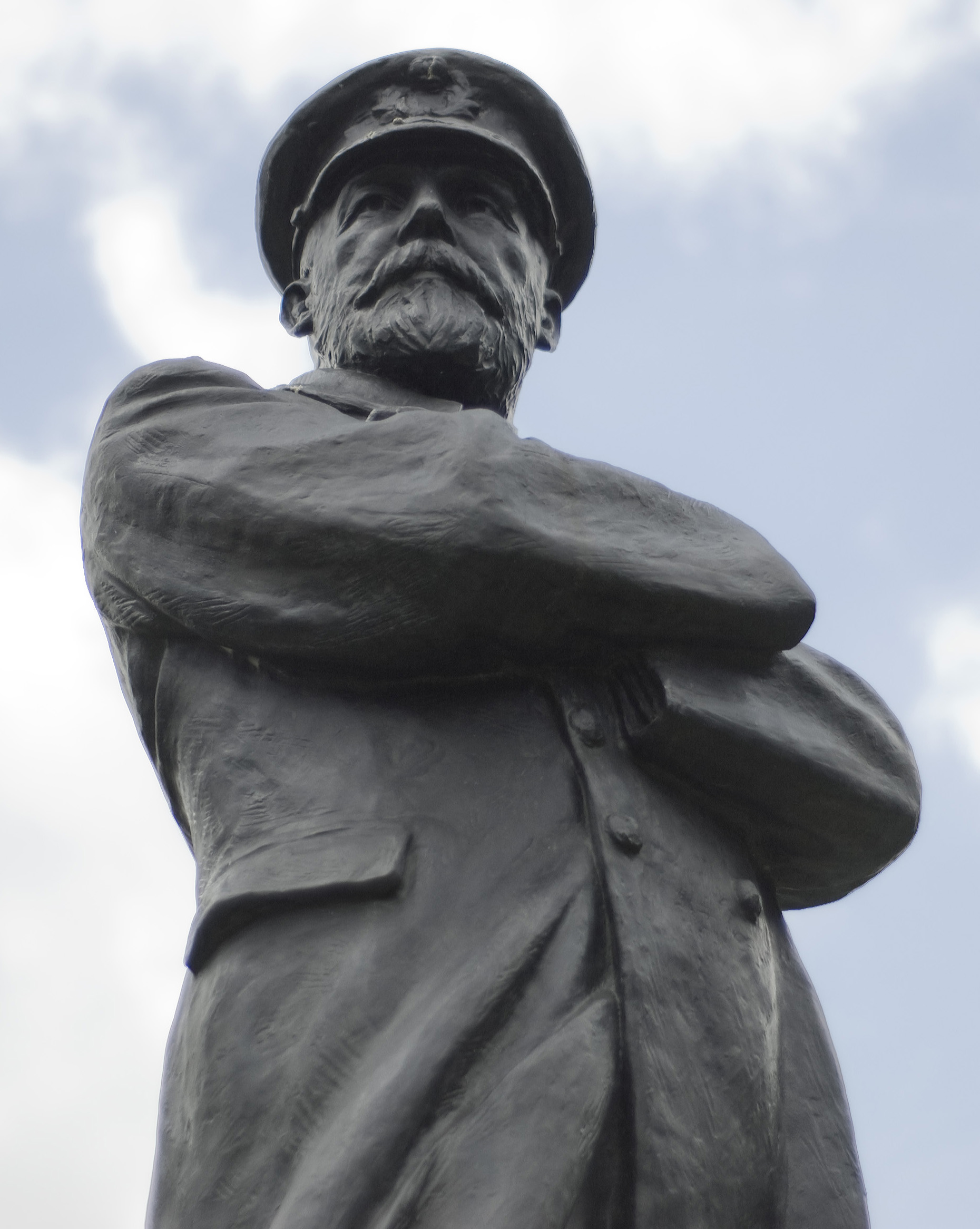
Captain Smith of the RMS Titanic

- Plaque of Martyrs – The plaque came into being as the seal for the city of Lichfield. The disputed story of 999 Christian martyrs who were killed by the Romans under pagan Emperor Diocletian in Lichfield in 288 CE is depicted in the stonework of the monument. It was located on the front of the Guildhall until, in 1744 during the Victorian restoration of the Guildhall the plaque was taken down a placed in storage. It emerged again in 1864, when it was moved to a rockery on the eastern side of the Museum Gardens. It lay in the rockery falling into a state of disrepair until 2010 when it was restored and relocated onto a plinth in the Recreation Grounds. The seal can also be seen on the railway bridge at St John's Street.
- Chancellor Law's Fountain – Unveiled in May 1871, the fountain was sculpted by Turner and Allen of London. The lions are made from Ashlar stone and the central figure is sculpted iron. The fountain was a gift from James Thomas Law who was the chancellor of the diocese and gave much to the city, including the statue of Samuel Johnson in the market square. The fountain is located at the centre of the Museum Gardens. In 2011 the fountain was restored with funding from Lichfield Conduit Lands Trust.

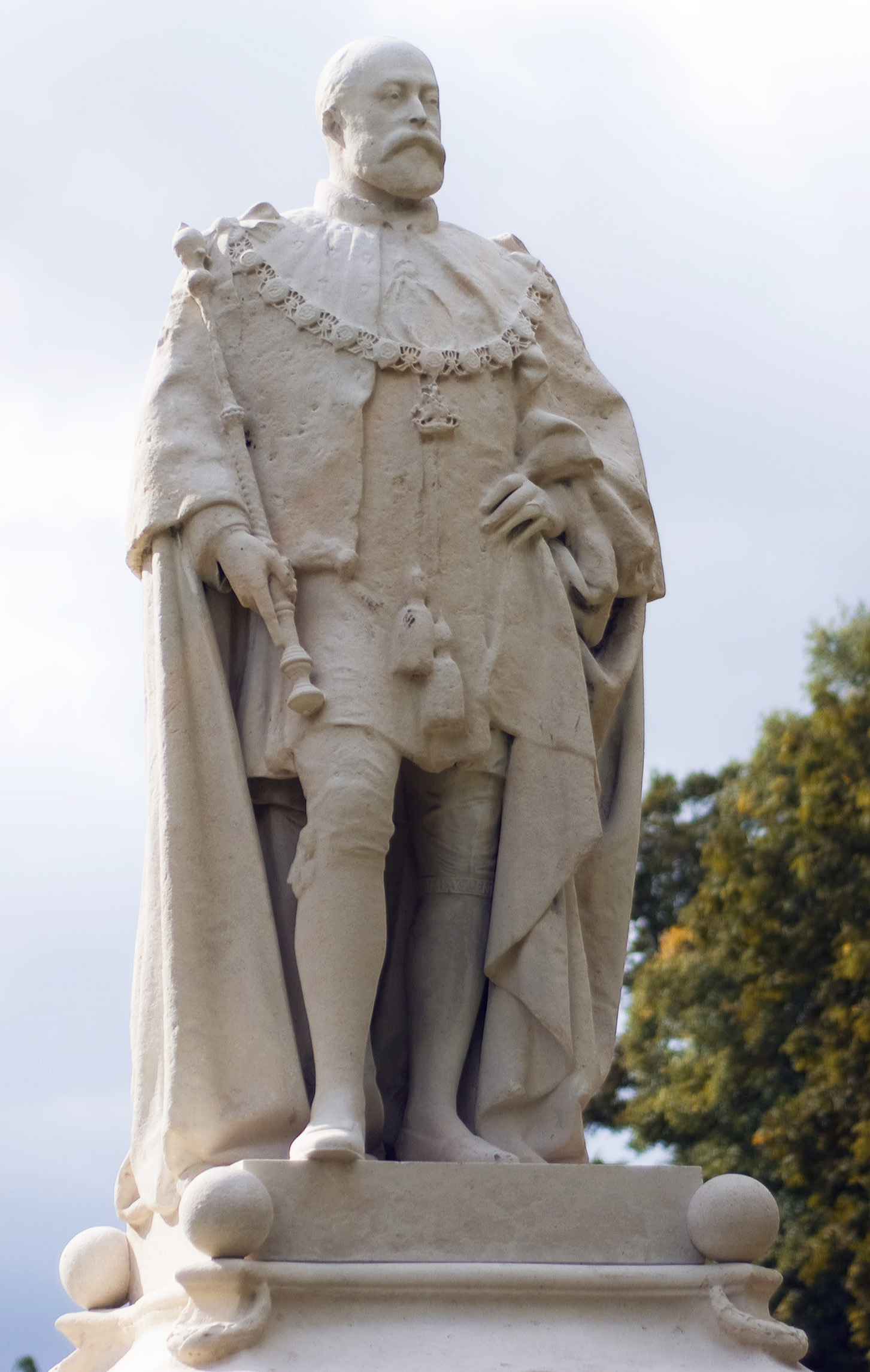
King Edward VII

- King Edward VII – Unveiled in September 1908 the statue was sculpted by local stonemason George Lowther of Robert Bridgeman & Sons of Lichfield. The pedestal is made of Hopton Wood Stone and the figure from Portland stone. Edward is portrayed in full coronation robes with a sceptre in his right hand. The arms of the City of Lichfield are on the front of the pedestal. The statue was erected during Edward's reign as a gesture of the city's loyalty to the King. The statue is located on the eastern end of the Museum Gardens. The statue was rededicated on 24 April 2013 by The Princess Royal.
- Captain Edward Smith (statue) – Unveiled in July 1914 at the western end of the Museum Gardens, the statue was sculpted by Kathleen Scott, wife of Antarctic explorer Robert Scott. The pedestal is made from Cornish granite and the figure is bronze. This is a memorial to the captain of the RMS Titanic, which sank on 15 April 1912. Captain Smith was from Hanley and Lichfield was chosen as the location for the monument because Smith was a Staffordshire man and Lichfield was the centre of the diocese. The statue originally cost £740 raised through local and national contributions. In 2010, as part of the 'Parks for People' programme, the statue was restored and the green patina removed from its surface at a cost of £16,000. In 2011 an unsuccessful campaign was started to get the statue moved back to Captain Smith's home town of Hanley.
- Colonel Swinfen Broun – Unveiled in September 1972, the memorial is a 1.9m high sandstone brick with two bronze plaques located on each side. In 1948 Lichfield mourned the loss of one of its most generous benefactors, Colonel Swinfen Broun. He had paid a large part of the cost of Victoria Hospital, given the Guildhall its clock and donated 12 acres (4.9 ha) of recreational land to Beacon Park in 1943. In his will he also left half of his estate at Swinfen Hall to Lichfield Cathedral and the other half to the Lichfield Corporation. A memorial was set up on the west bank of Beacon Pool after his death in recognition to his contribution to the city.
- Erasmus Darwin – Unveiled on 12 December 2012, a 2.3 metres (7.5 ft) high bronze statue of Erasmus Darwin sculpted by Peter Walker. The statue was estimated to cost £61,500 with 30% of the funds to come from Section 106 funding. The statue is located near to the Bird Street entrance to the Museum Gardens.

== Recreational uses ==
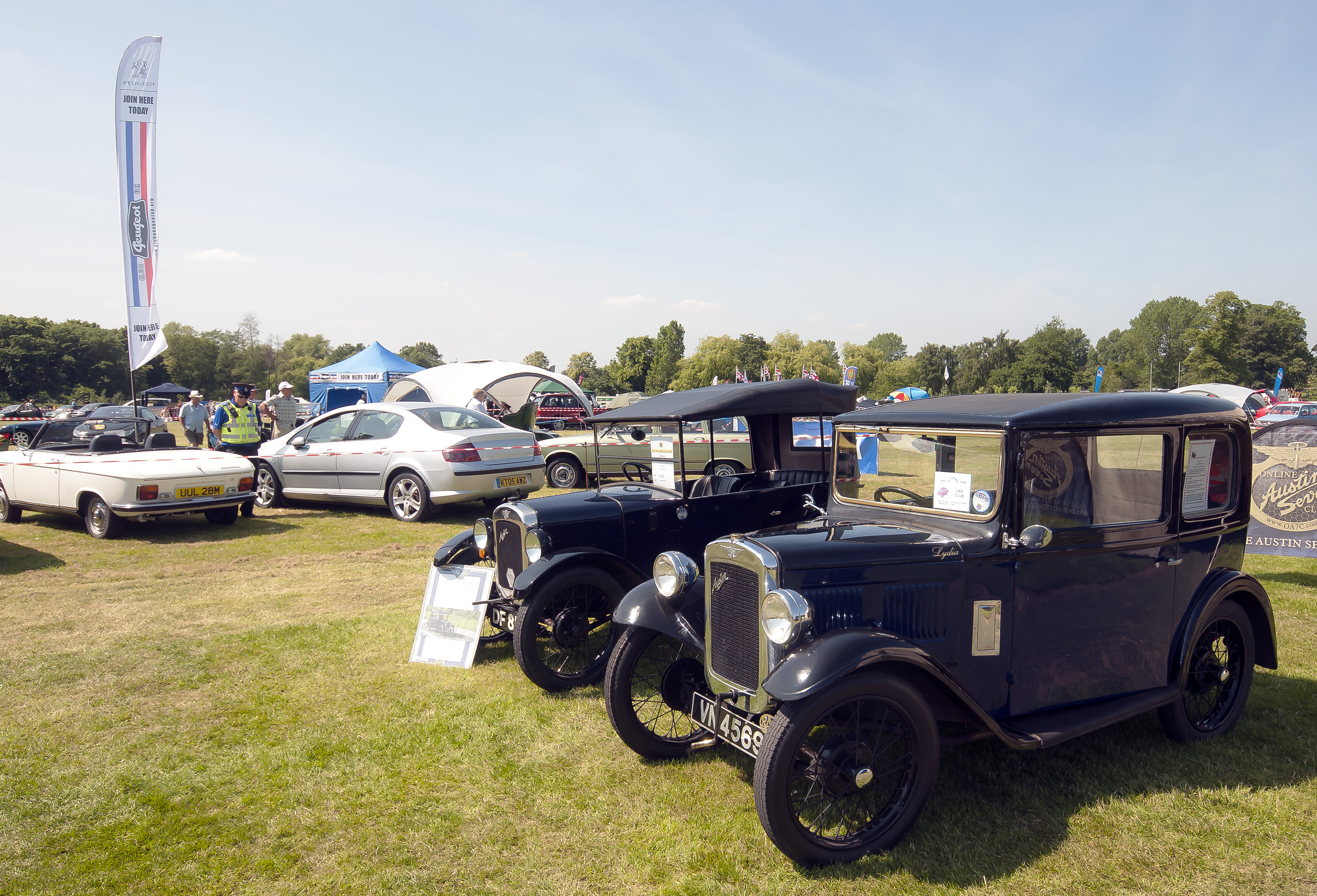
Classic Cars on display at 'Cars In The Park'

The park has many sporting facilities including flat and crown bowling greens in the recreation grounds. The Lichfield Museum Bowling Club has been playing on the greens since 1922 and is one of the oldest bowling clubs in the country. There are four asphalt surfaced tennis courts built in 1932, six football pitches (seasonal), a basketball court, a cricket pitch (seasonal) and an eighteen-hole public golf course.

In addition to sports, other recreational facilities are available. These include a crazy golf course, a young children's playground and an older children's playground. During the summer season activities such as canoeing on Beacon Pool, donkey rides, giant board games and a bouncy castle are available in the park.

Two new catering facilities in the park opened in May 2012. The Lakeside Bistro near Beacon Pool and Chandlers Café at the Bird Street entrance to the park were built as part of the works following the £3.9 million grant and Chandlers Group spent £200,000 fitting out the new facilities.

== Entertainment uses ==
The park is used as a venue for many entertainment events throughout the year. The Lichfield bower and the Lichfield Festival hold events in the park annually, during the summer. 'Cars in the Park' takes place annually at the end of June. First held in 1997, 'Cars in the Park' showcases more than 1,000 vintage and modern cars and 62 car clubs took part in the 2011 event. Lichfield Proms in the Park, an open air classical music event, takes place annually on the first Saturday of September. A big top Circus also comes to the park annually in Spring.

== Gallery ==
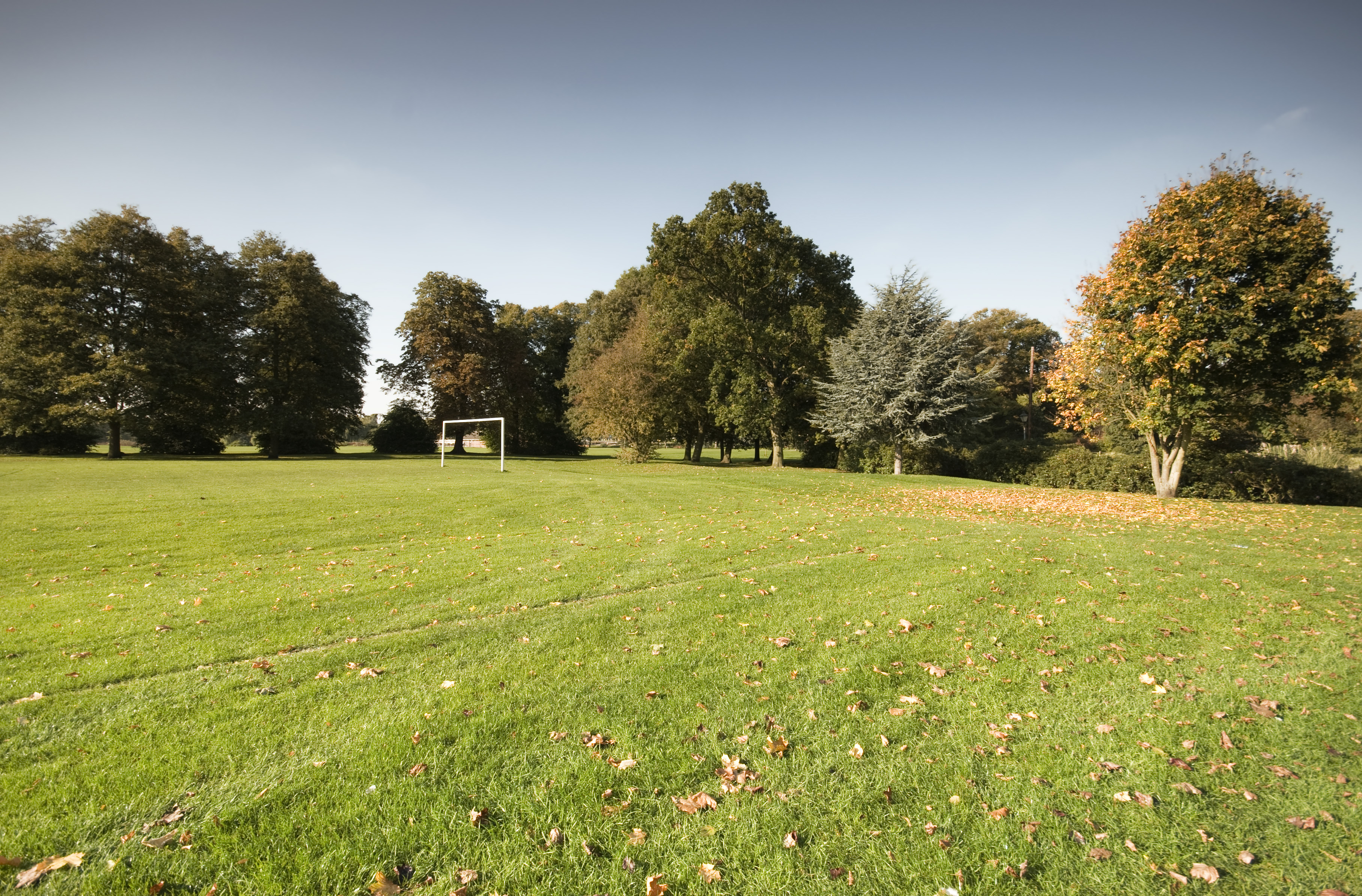
Football pitch in the park

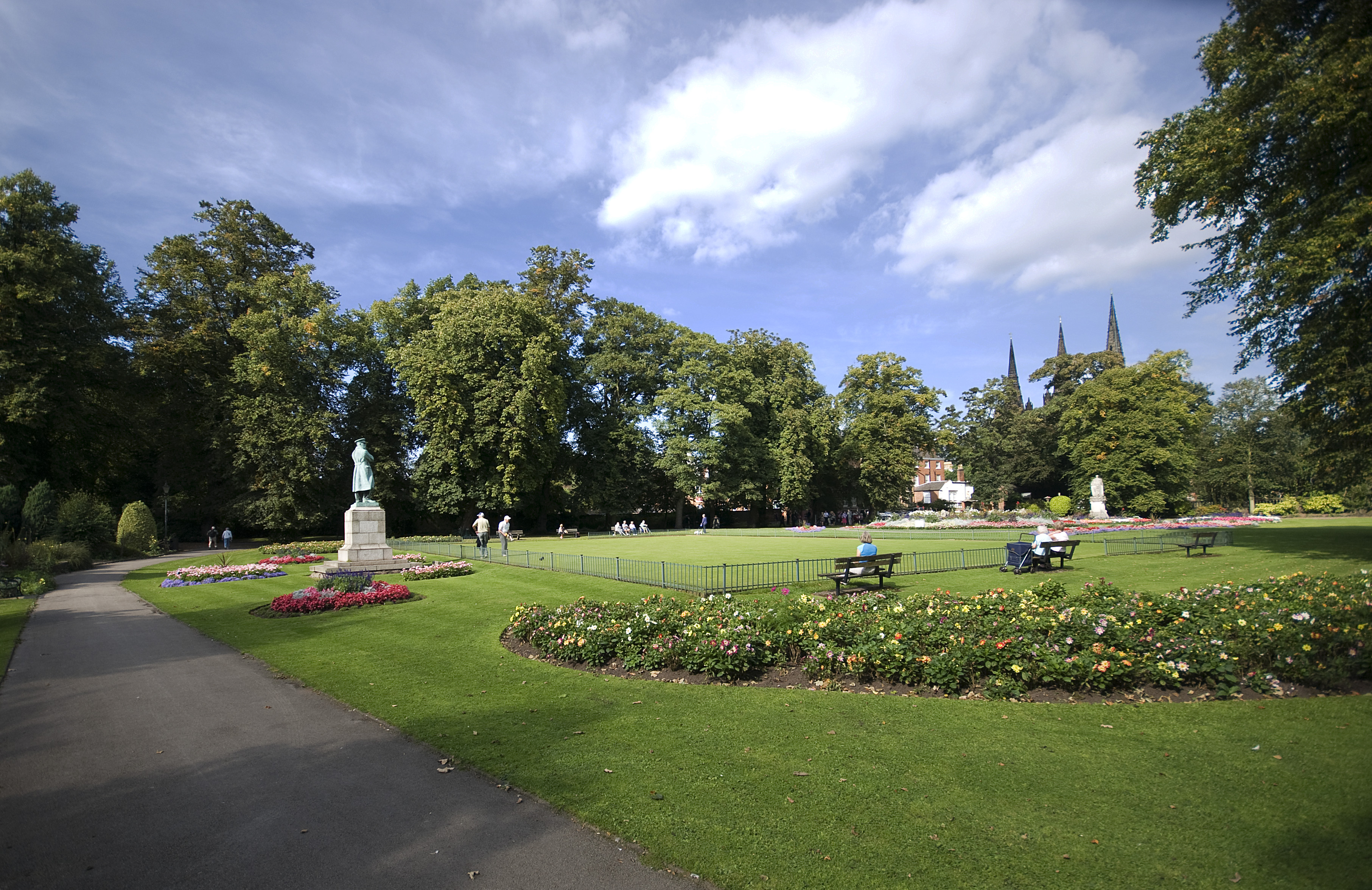
Museum Gardens in 2009, before restoration

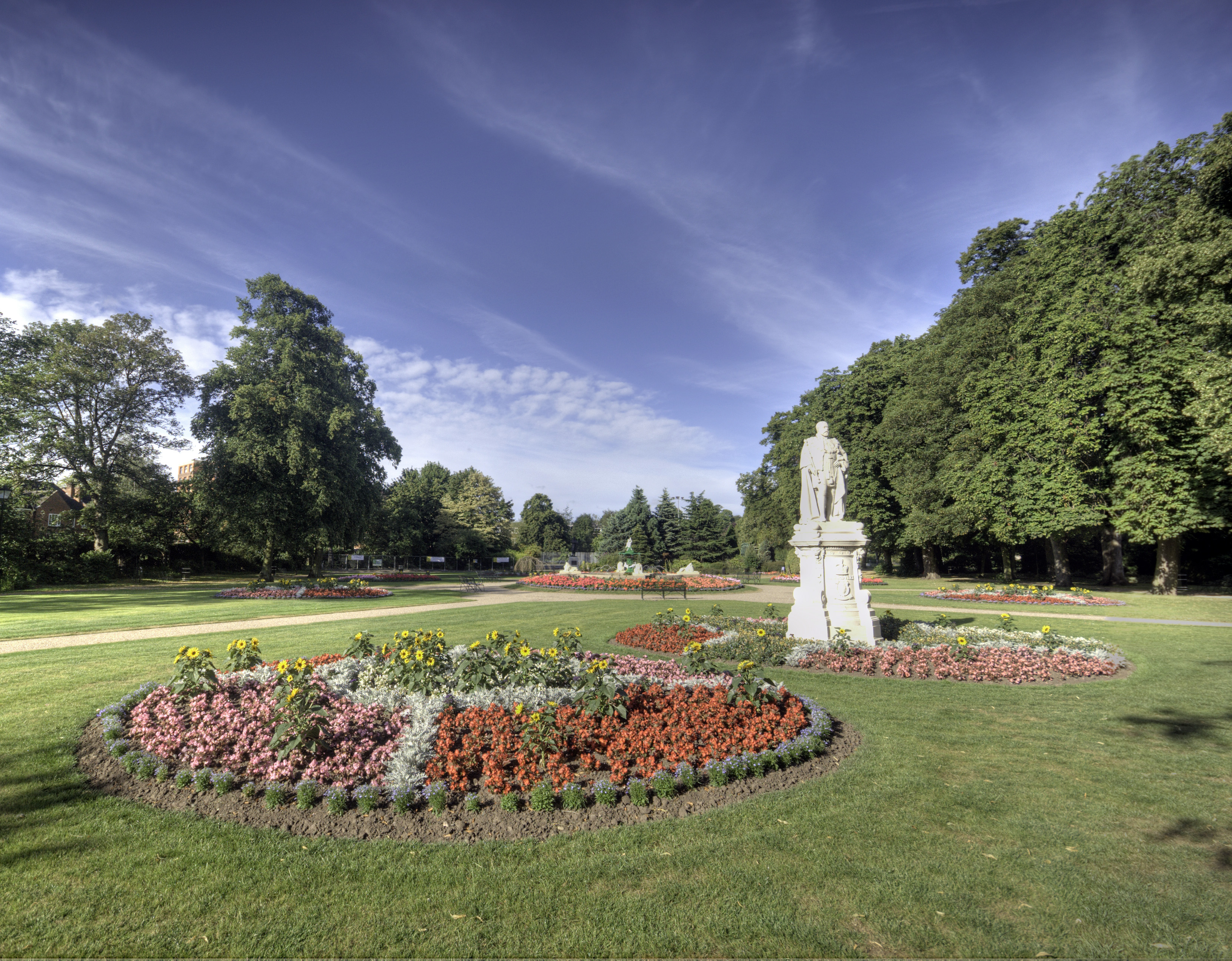
Museum Gardens

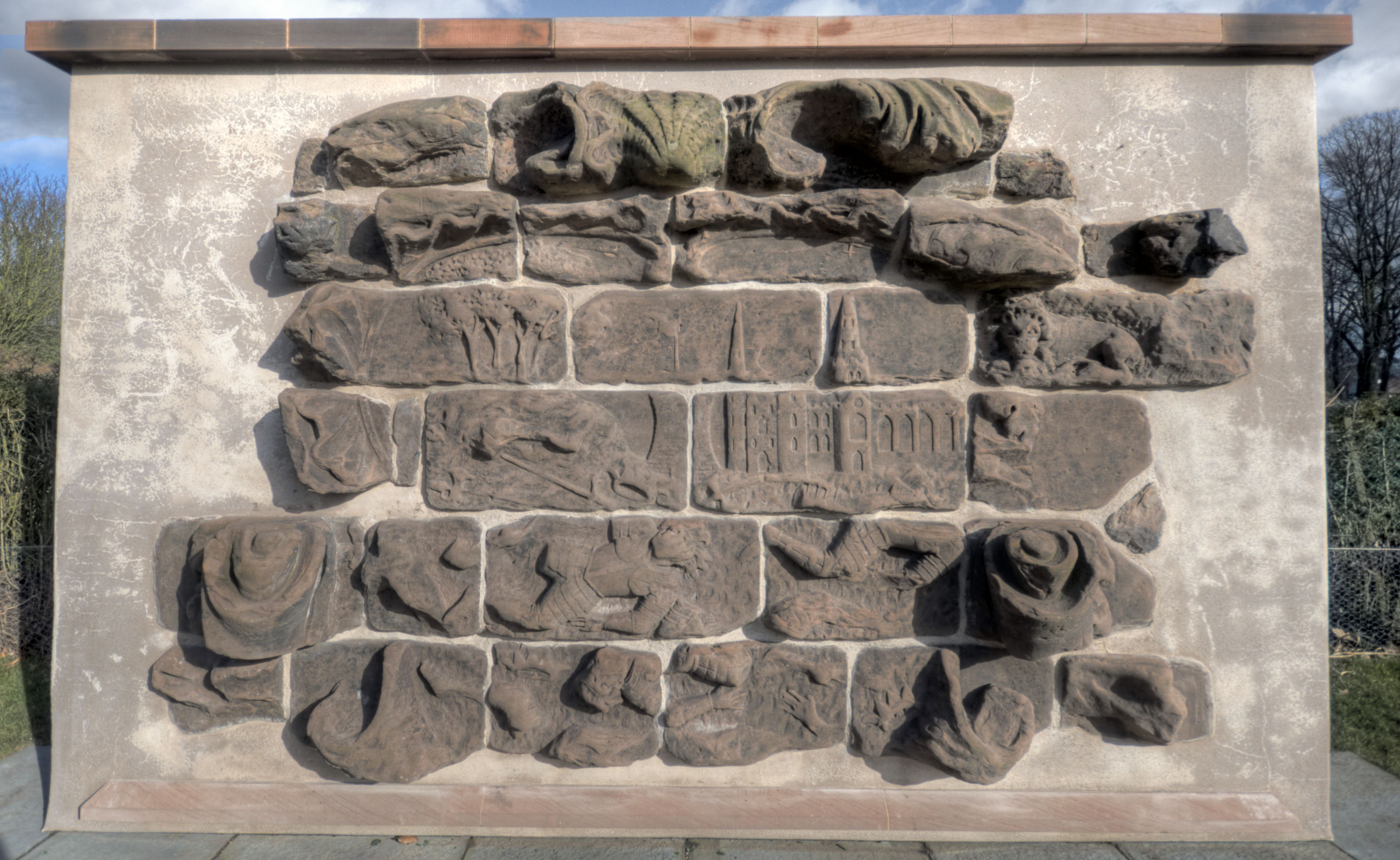
Plaque of Martyrs in the Recreation Grounds

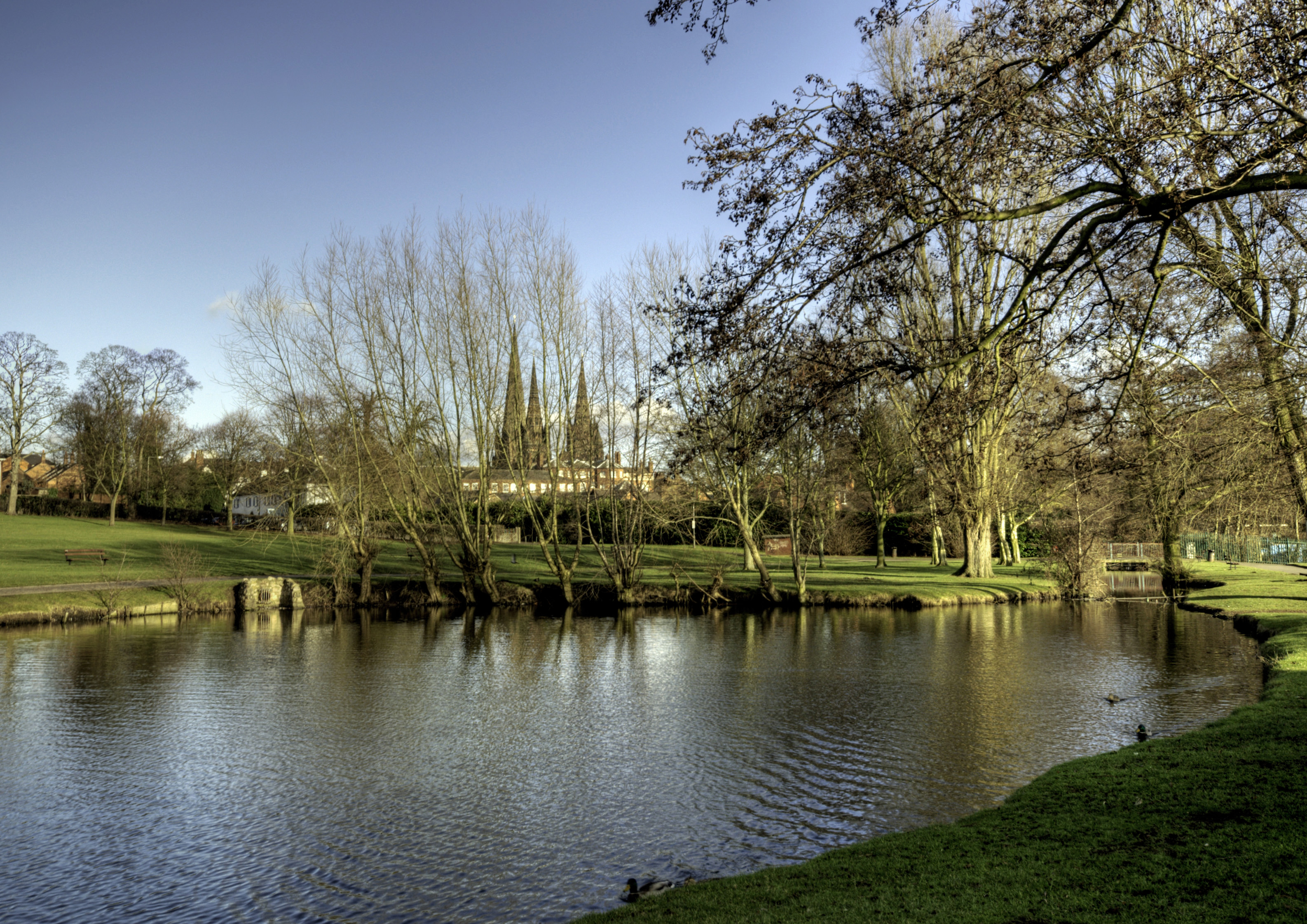
Beacon Pool, fed by Leamonsley Brook

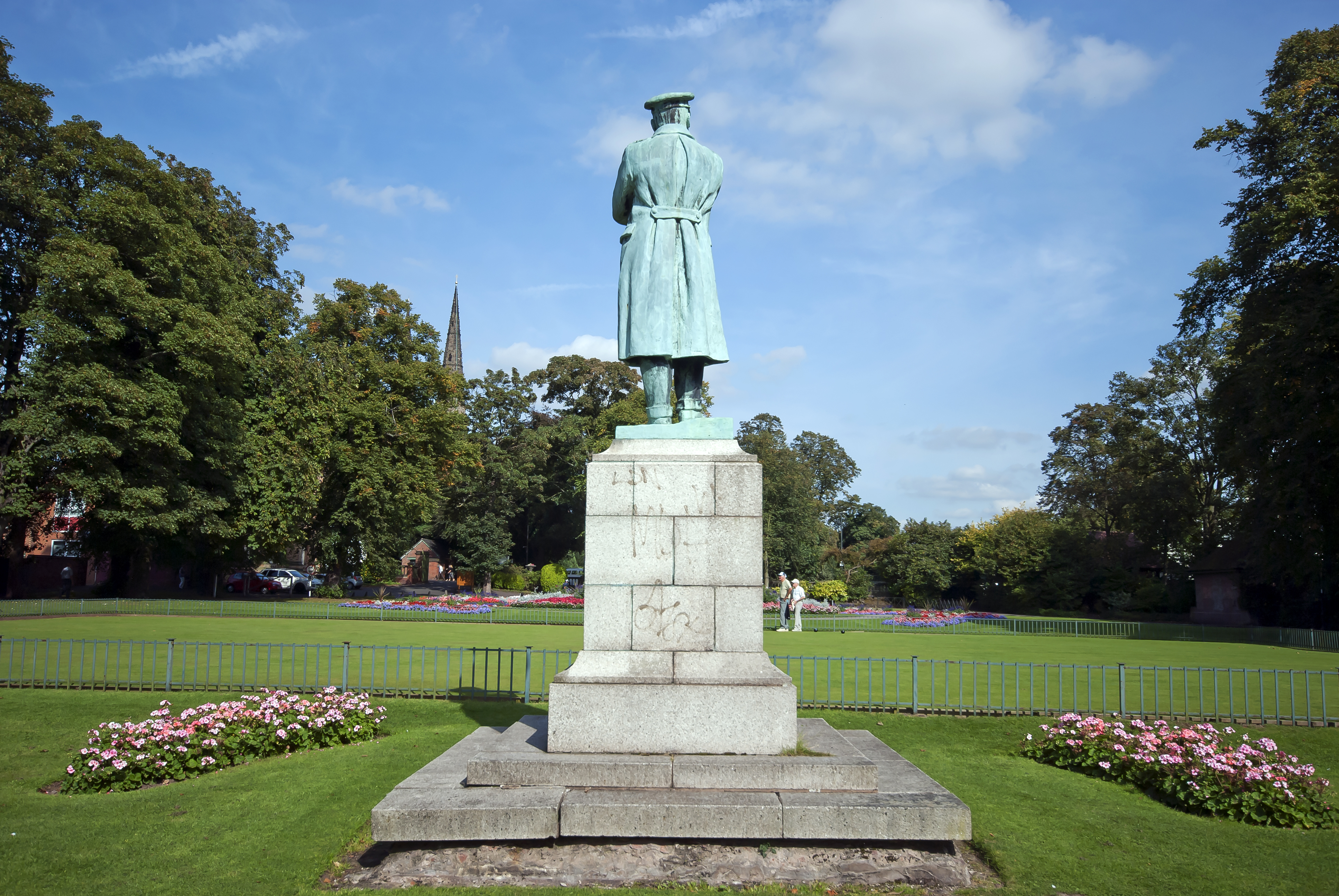
Captain Smith statue, prior to 2010 restoration

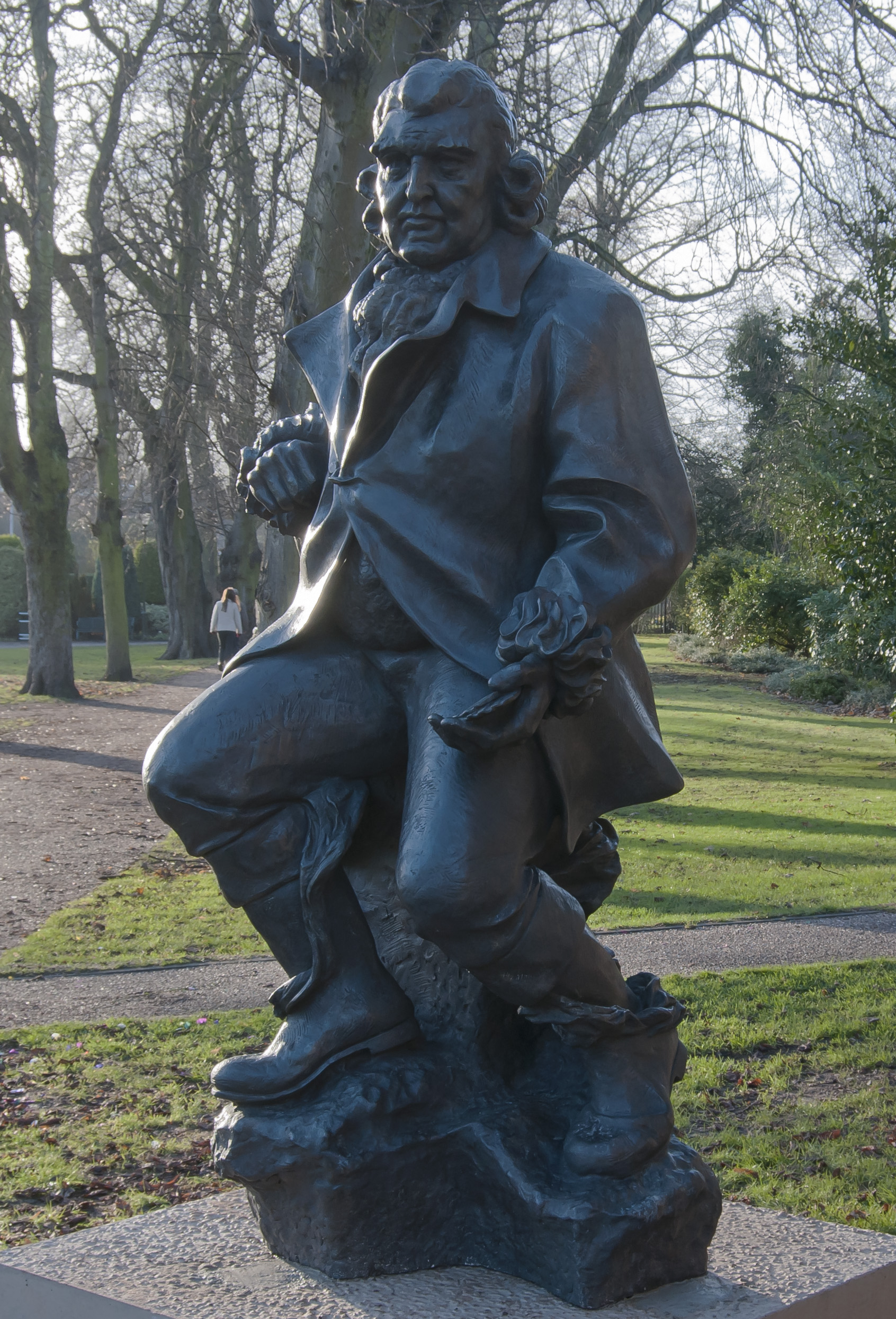
Erasmus Darwin statue
