= Burton & South Derbyshire College =

College in Burton upon Trent, Staffordshire, England

Coordinates: 52.7996°N 1.6311°W

Information
- Former name: Burton College
- Ofsted: Reports
- Website: www.bsdc.ac.uk

Burton & South Derbyshire College (BSDC) is a general further education college and is situated in Burton upon Trent town centre. It attracts approximately 13,000 students from Burton and the surrounding towns and villages. It delivers a wide range of courses for all ages including 16- to 19-year-olds, adults into part-time study, employer training and higher education. Recently a 'university centre' has been developed within the college to enable students to study on franchised higher education courses, but is not in itself a university.

The University of Wolverhampton's School of Health and Wellbeing has a presence at Burton Health Education Centre located at the Queen's Hospital, Burton upon Trent, which specialises in nursing.

In early 2011 the college was renamed from "Burton College".

== Courses ==
Burton and South Derbyshire College has a variety of course types, including:

- Access to "HE"
- Business & Administration
- Catering & Hospitality
- Childcare & Education
- Computer Science
- Construction
- Creative, Design & Digital Media
- Distance Learning
- Engineering and Fab & Welding
- ESOL
- Finance & Accounting
- Foundation Learning
- GCSEs and Functional Skills
- Hair & Beauty
- Health & Social Care and Science
- Health, Safety & First Aid
- Languages
- Motor Vehicle
- Never Too Late To Learn
- Performing Arts
- Public Services
- Sport
- Travel and Tourism

Burton and South Derbyshire College also offers university level courses in conjunction with Staffordshire University, Wolverhampton University and Nottingham Trent University including:

- Alternative Sustainable Solutions in Construction
- Business Management and Sustainability
- Computer Science (FdSc )
- Construction & the Built Environment
- Contemporary Creative
- Education and Training
- Engineering (General) (HNC)
- Health and Social Care (Foundation Degree)
- Higher Technical Qualification in Architectural Technology
- Higher Technical Qualification in Construction Management
- Leadership and Management
- Performing Arts (Dance)
- Sport

== Employer Engagement Unit ==
The Employer Engagement Unit is the commercial training arm of Burton College. The Unit is able to provide customised training for all types of organisations. Through the Employer Engagement Unit, the College is able to offer the Train to Gain Service and Apprenticeships.

In December 2008, Burton College was only 1 of 35 colleges in the UK to achieve the Training Quality Standard (TQS), an assessment which recognises the quality of industry training provision. Earlier that year, the Employer Engagement Unit had also achieved The Matrix accreditation which the college's Student Services Department had also achieved in 2004.

== Campus ==
The Creative Hub

Burton College's Faculty of Creative Studies is sited in a new teaching block. The teaching block contains facilities for:

• Digital and media production. • Textile and fashion design. • 3D design. • Traditional fine art and graphic design with MAC computer facilities. • Music technology sound recording studio. • Industry standard hair and beauty salons.

Performing Arts courses have also benefited from new dance and drama studios, and a stage set-up which simulates a real-life theatre environment. This allows students to learn about the practicalities of drama production, music and music technology, recording and sound.

Business and Management Centre The teaching block also houses a Management and Business Centre. Higher Education Students on professional and management courses have access to study facilities, which incorporate the latest digital teaching and learning technology. The facilities provide a setting for delivering the new suite of Chartered Management Institute courses.

Sport Management The £1 million sports hall at the town's Shobnall Leisure Complex is based on a design put forward by Sport for England. It provides modern facilities for a wide variety of activities including badminton, basketball, volleyball, five-aside football, netball and cricket.

IT and Learning Resource Centre The college's Learning Resource Centre (LRC) was expanded in 2003/04 to provide 207 personal computers in addition to the 22 "quiet study" computers in the library and 20 learndirect computers.

The library, on the ground floor of the LRC, has a 40,000 book stock. Two data projectors are installed on the first floor for teaching and learning. The library's website provides guidance on access to online services and partner university electronic information services which are searchable by an online catalogue. The College has a Managed Learning Environment (MLE) which gives students access to the college's e-learning materials. Over 160 courses are loaded on the MLE for lecturers to post/track online materials and assessments for students.

== The University Centre ==
The University Centre, which is sited in Burton's Abbey Street, incorporates a three-storey teaching block including amenities from computer rooms and a cyber café to a recording studio and business centre, and laboratory and workshop facilities.

The development complements the investment already made in recent years, including a £1.5 million Learning Resource Centre and the development of an Advanced Manufacturing Centre, whilst during 2002/03 approximately £7 million was invested upgrading the college's facilities at the Town Centre Campus and the nearby Shobnall Leisure Complex. A Lean Manufacturing Centre is situated on the ground floor designed to replicate a factory environment.

In addition, there are 10 start up units for small one and two person businesses. The units offer graduates the opportunity to set up a business in a protected environment with low cost rents.

== Alumni ==
- Paddy Considine, actor, film director
- Shane Meadows, film director
- Nick Hemming, musician, songwriter
- Michael Socha, actor
- Lauren Socha, actress
