= Vincent Woropay =

Vincent Woropay (4 December 1951 – 12 June 2002) was an English sculptor and teacher.

== Life ==
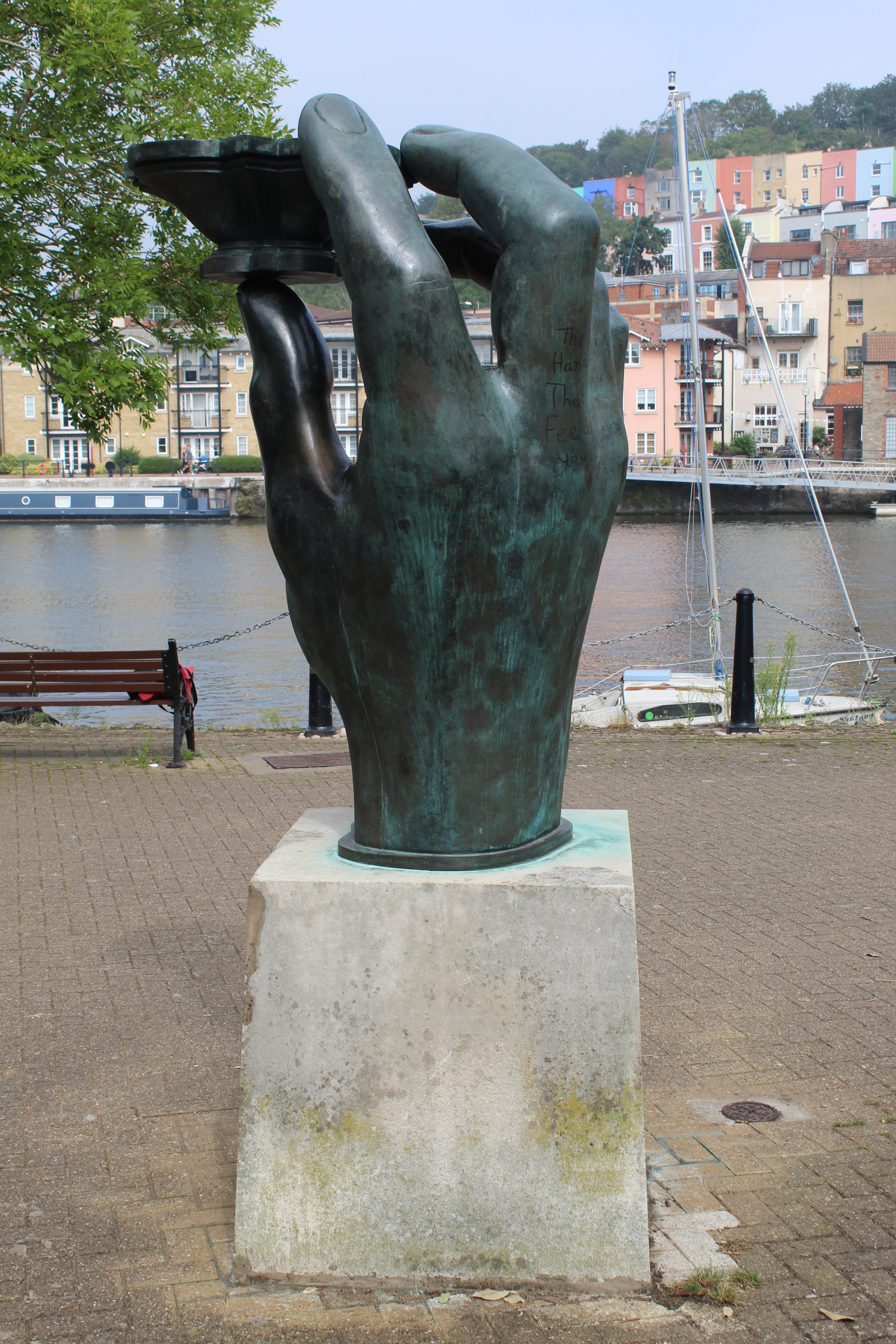
"Hand of the River God" (1984)

Woropay was born in London, of Polish parents. He studied fine art at Brighton Polytechnic, gaining a first class honours degree in 1977, and at the Slade School of Fine Art he obtained a higher diploma in 1979. He was a fellow of the British School at Rome from 1979 to 1981. He was a lecturer at Middlesex Polytechnic from 1981 to 1991, and from 1991 was a senior lecturer at the Wimbledon School of Art.

Woropay died of cancer of the thorax, aged 50, in 2002.

== Works ==
In an obituary, Anthony Howell wrote that Woropay's sculptures "give material form to a fluidity between reality and imagination more usually associated with language and literature.... His art was an attempt to capture what is fleeting... or to suggest the passing of the monumental." Woropay's works include the following:

"Hand of the River God", of 1984, is situated at the quayside of Baltic Wharf in Bristol. It is a colossal hand holding up a fountain between fingers and thumb.

"Capo", a head of Josiah Wedgwood carved out of bricks, was commissioned for the 1986 Stoke-on-Trent Garden Festival. It was moved in 2009 to Festival Way near Etruria Hall, once Josiah Wedgwood's home. After its demolition was mistakenly ordered during road-widening work in January 2023, plans for its restoration were announced by Stoke-on-Trent City Council in June 2023. The city council confirmed that the sculpture had been rebuilt in July 2025 and that though it would not be returned to its original position, due to the new road, it would be located somewhere else at Festival Park. The restored sculpture, now situated in front of Etruria Hall, was unveiled on 26 October 2025 by the sculptor's widow Chloe Chard. She said that the restoration had been done "very well, by people who had great attention to detail and to reviving the sculpture as it was."

"Wattilisk", of 1988, was commissioned by Birmingham City Council. The sculpture has five surmounted portrait heads of James Watt in differing stages of abstraction, its form having an affinity with Egyptian obelisks.

"Hand with Chronos", a giant hand with a small figure in its palm, was commissioned for the 1990 Gateshead Garden Festival, and was later moved to Stoke-on-Trent railway station.
