= Frances Clark =

Frances Clark may refer to:

- Frances Clark (pianist) (1905–1998), American pianist and academic
- Frances Elliott Clark (1860–1958), American music appreciation advocate
- Frances Naomi Clark (1894–1987), American ichthyologist

== See also ==
- Frances Clarke (disambiguation)
- Francis Clark (disambiguation)
- Francis Clarke (disambiguation)
