= Frances Clarke =

Frances Clarke may refer to:

- Frances Clarke (charity executive) of England, president of the Venice in Peril Fund
- Frances Clarke Sayers, née Clarke (1897–1989), American librarian and author
- Frances Elizabeth Bellenden Clarke, later Sarah Grand (1854–1943)

== See also ==
- Frances Clark (disambiguation)
- Francis Clark (disambiguation)
- Francis Clarke (disambiguation)
