= Louis Henry Strean =

Irish Priest

Louis Henry Strean was an Irish Anglican priest.

Strean was born in County Roscommon and educated at Trinity College, Dublin. He was Archdeacon of Elphin from 1845 to 1847.
