= The Country Parson =

The Country Parson may refer to:

- A Priest to the Temple, or the Country Parson (1652), often abbreviated The Country Parson, a handbook on pastoral care by George Herbert, a Welsh-born English poet, orator and Anglican priest
- The Country Parson, a pseudonym used by various writers on (generally Protestant) religious and moral topics in early modern American periodicals (e.g. The Monthly Religious Magazine, 1863)
- Country Parson, a series of one-panel syndicated newspaper cartoons, always featuring a short aphorism or observation (modeled in part on the original anonymous Country Parsons' writings), created and written by Frank A. Clark (1911–1991) of Iowa, illustrated by Wally Falk and later Dennis Neal, running from April 1955 through October 1985.
