= Francis Clerke =

Francis Clerke may refer to:

- Francis Clerke (lawyer) (fl. 1594), English lawyer
- Francis Clerke (politician, died 1686) (c. 1624–1686), English politician, MP for Rochester
- Francis Clerke (politician, died 1715) (c. 1655–1715), English politician, MP for Oxfordshire
- Francis Clerke (politician, died 1691) (c. 1665–1691), English politician, MP for Rochester
- Sir Francis Clerke, 6th Baronet (1682–1769), of the Clerke baronets, Gentleman Usher
- Sir Francis Clerke, 7th Baronet (1748–1778), aide-de-camp to General John Burgoyne, killed at Saratoga

== See also ==
- Francis Clark (disambiguation)
- Frank Clarke (disambiguation)
