= James Thomas Law =

English cleric

- Born: 1790
- Died: 22 February 1876 (aged 85–86)
- Occupation: Cleric
- Spouse: Henrietta Charlotte Grey (m. 1763)
- Children: 4
- Parent(s): George Henry Law; Jane Adeane

James Thomas Law (1790–1876) was an English clergyman, the chancellor of the diocese of Lichfield from 1821.

== Life ==
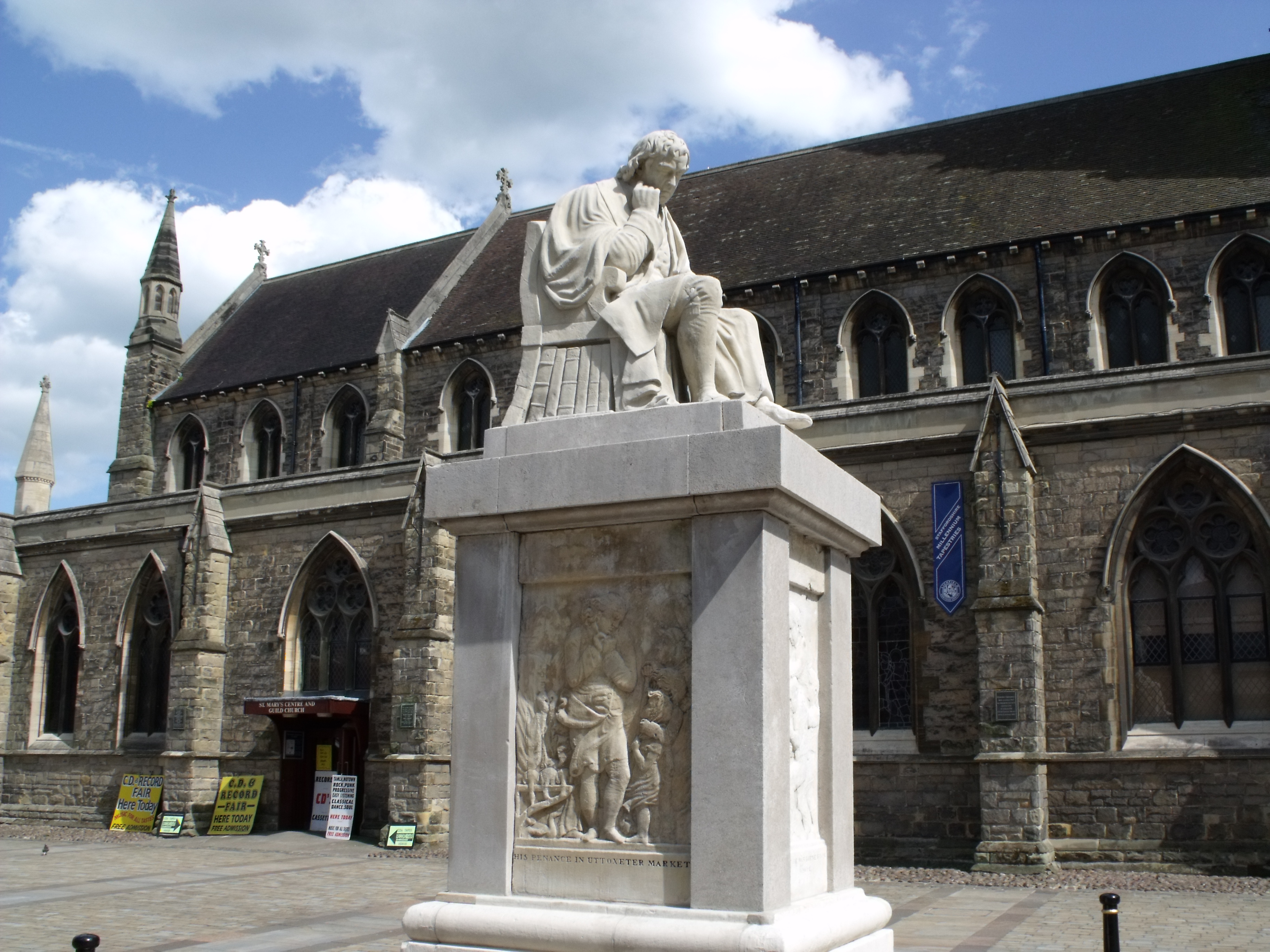
The Samuel Johnson statue in Lichfield has an inscription recording its gift by Law in 1838

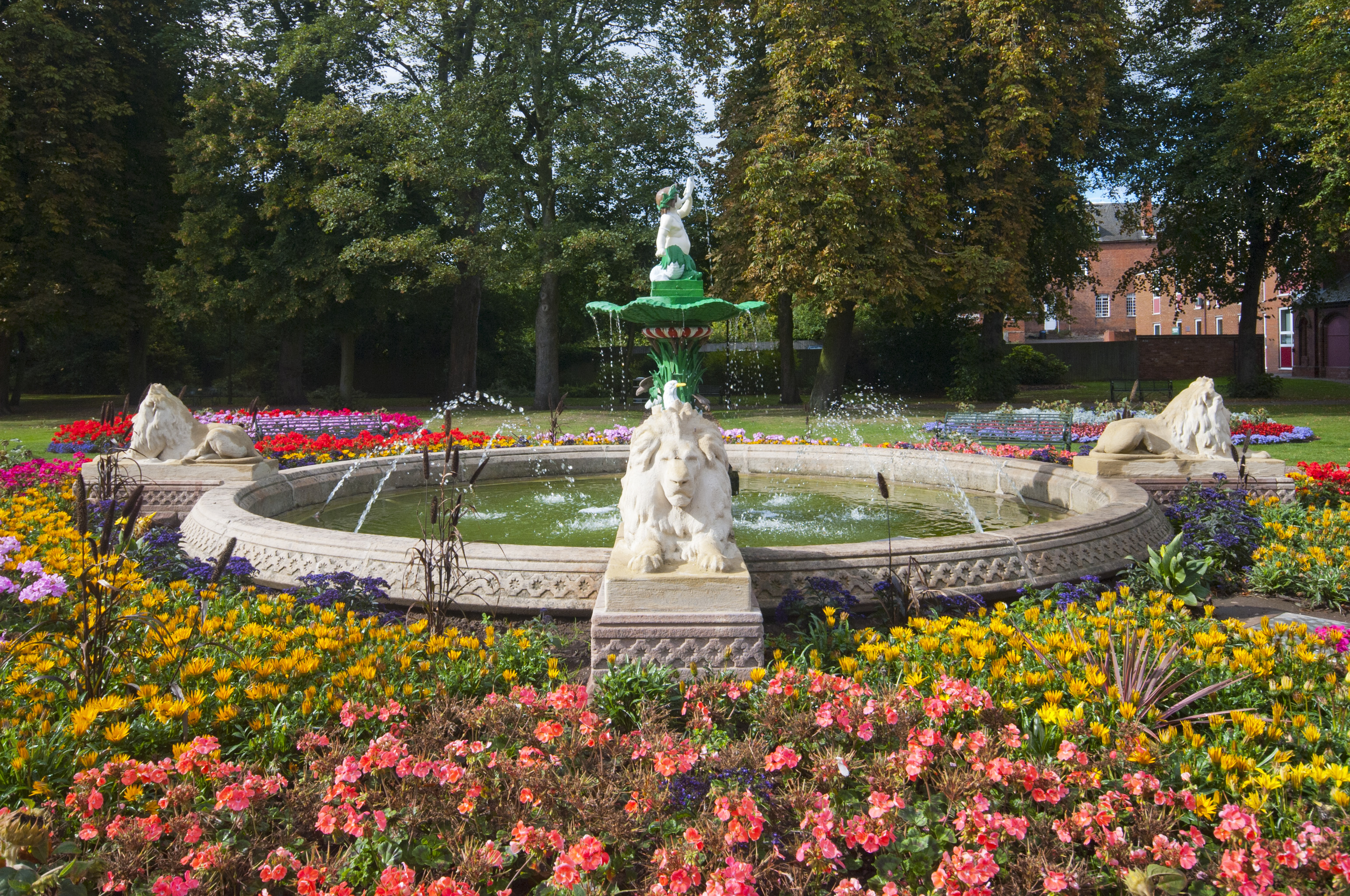
Chancellor Law's Fountain in Beacon Park, Lichfield

He was eldest son of George Henry Law, the bishop of Bath and Wells, and Jane, daughter of General James Whorwood Adeane, MP, of Babraham, Cambridgeshire. He was educated at Christ's College, Cambridge, graduated B.A. in 1812 as second senior optime, and was chosen fellow of the college. He took holy orders in 1814, and proceeded M.A. in 1815.

On 9 April 1818 Law was made prebendary of Chester Cathedral, and on 18 July following prebendary of Lichfield Cathedral. In 1821 he was appointed chancellor of the diocese of Lichfield, in 1824 commissary of the archdeaconry of Richmond, and in 1840 special commissary of the diocese of Bath and Wells.

Law supported the Birmingham School of Medicine and Surgery at Queen's College, Birmingham, of which he was elected honorary warden in 1846, and the Lichfield Theological College. He was master of St John's Hospital, Lichfield.

Law was a benefactor to the city of Lichfield. In 1838 he gave the statue of Samuel Johnson in the Market Square. Chancellor Law's Fountain in Beacon Park was unveiled in 1871.

Law died at Lichfield on 22 February 1876. The monument to Law and his wife in the churchyard of St Michael on Greenhill, Lichfield is a listed building; it originally had a clock illuminated by gas.

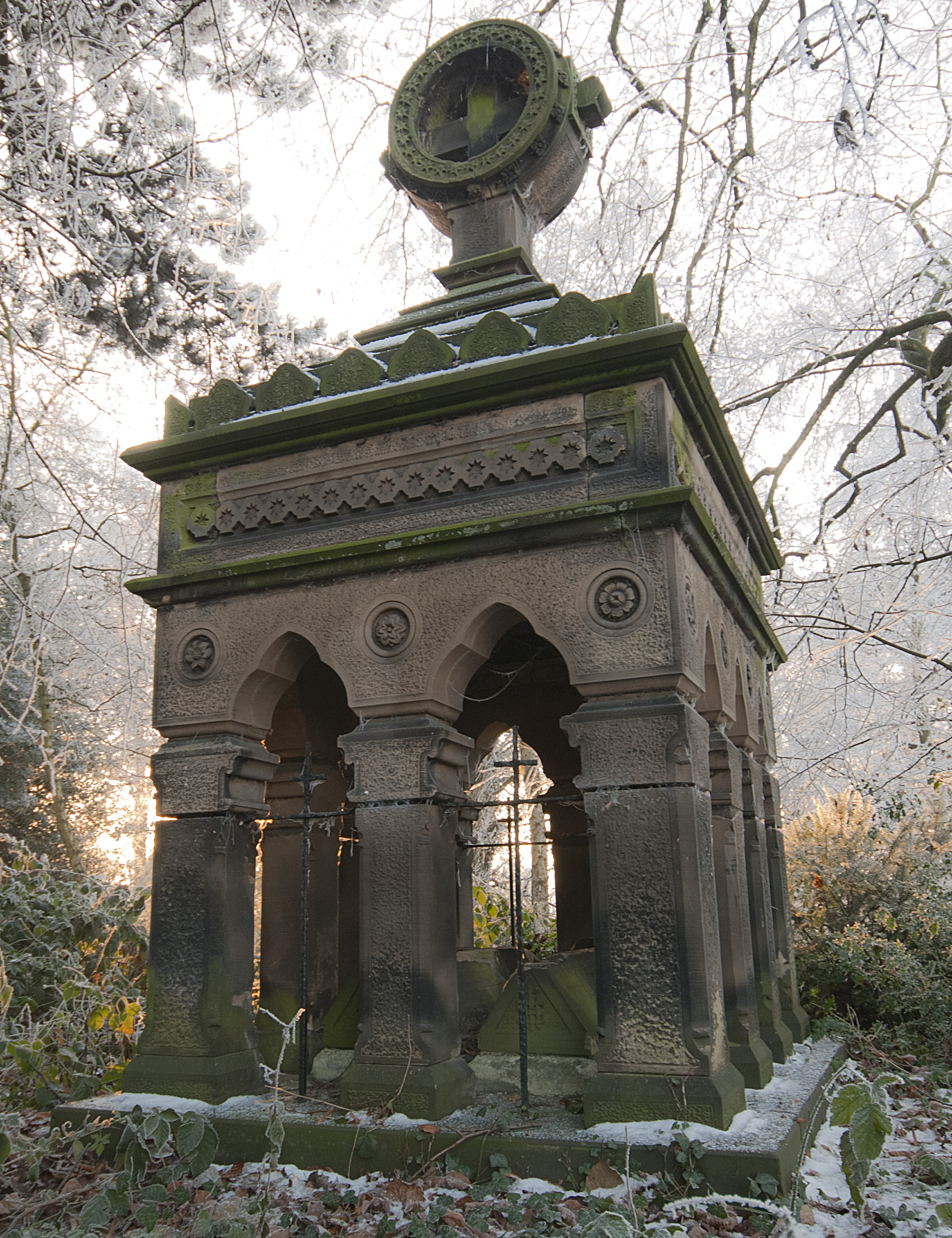
Mausoleum of James Thomas Law at St Michael on Greenhill, Lichfield

== Works ==
Law published, with charges and pamphlets:

- A Catechetical Exposition of the Apostles' Creed, London, 1825.
- The Poor Man's Garden, or a few brief Rules for Regulating Allotments of Land to the Poor for Potatoe Gardens, London, 1830; 4th edit. 1831.
- The Acts for Building and Promoting the Building of Additional Churches in Populous Parishes arranged and harmonised, London, 1841; 3rd edit. 1853.
- The Ecclesiastical Statutes at large, extracted from the great body of the Statute Law and arranged under separate heads, 5 vols. London, 1847.
- Lectures on the Ecclesiastical Law of England, pt. i. London, 1861.
- Lectures on the Office and Duties of Churchwardens, London, 1861.
- Materials for a Brief History of ... Queen's College, Birmingham; with a Supplement and Appendices, arranged by Mr. Chancellor Law, Lichfield, 1869.

Law also published Forms of Ecclesiastical Law, London, 1831 (another edit. 1844); it was a translation of the first part of Thomas Oughton's Ordo Judiciorum,. There were with it materials from other jurists and authorities: Francis Clerke's Praxis; Henry Conset's Practice of the Spiritual or Ecclesiastical Courts; John Ayliffe's Parergon; William Cockburn's Clerk's Assistant in the Practice of the Ecclesiastical Courts; and Edmund Gibson's Codex juris ecclesiastici Anglicani.

== Family ==
On 16 December 1820 Grey married Lady Henrietta Charlotte Grey (1799–1866), eldest daughter of George Grey, 6th Earl of Stamford. They had four children.

== Notes ==
Attribution

This article incorporates text from a publication now in the public domain: Lee, Sidney, ed. (1892). "Law, James Thomas". Dictionary of National Biography. Vol. 32. London: Smith, Elder & Co.
