= Francis Clarke =

Francis Clarke may refer to:

- Francis Clarke (New South Wales politician) (1857–1939), Australian politician
- Francis Grenville Clarke (1879–1955), Australian politician from Victoria
- Francis Clarke (mathematician) (born 1948), Canadian and French mathematician
- Francis Clarke (priest) (died 1910), Irish Anglican clergyman
- Francis Coningsby Hannam Clarke (1842–1893), British military officer

== See also ==
- Francis Clark (disambiguation)
- Francis Clerke (disambiguation)
- Frank Clarke (disambiguation)
- Frank Clark (disambiguation)
