= Ephraim Monsell =

Ephraim Monsell (1725 - 1798) was an Irish Anglican priest.

Monsell was born in Limerick and educated at Trinity College, Dublin. He was appointed Archdeacon of Elphin in 1782 and held the post until his death.
