= Francis Clarke (priest) =

Irish Anglican clergyman

Francis Edward Clarke was an Irish Anglican clergyman.

Clarke was born in Armagh, was educated at Trinity College, Dublin; and ordained in 1879. After a curacy in Kilashee, he was the incumbent at Killinagh from 1879 until 1883. He was then at Boyle from 1883; and Archdeacon of Elphin from 1904 until his death on 9 March 1910.

Religious titles
Preceded by Alexander Major Kearney	Archdeacon of Elphin; 1904–1910	Succeeded by William Wolfe Wagner
