= Frank Clark =

Frank Clark may refer to:

- Frank A. Clark (1911–1991), American cartoon writer
- Frank Clark (actor) (1857–1945), American actor of the silent era
- Frank Clark (footballer) (born 1943), English football player, manager and chairman (Newcastle United, Nottingham Forest)
- Frank Clark (politician) (1860–1936), U.S. representative from Florida, 1905–1925
- Frank Hamilton Clark (1844–1882), Philadelphia banker
- Frank Howard Clark (1888–1962), American screenwriter
- Frank M. Clark (1915–2003), U.S. representative from Pennsylvania, 1955–1974
- Frank M. Clark (businessman), American business executive who served as president of the Chicago Board of Education
- Frank Clark (racewalker) (born 1943), Australian former race-walker
- Frank Chamberlain Clark (1872–1957), American architect active in Southern Oregon
- Frank Clark (American football) (born 1993), American football player for the Seattle Seahawks
- Frank Clark Jr., American politician from Florida
- Frank Clark (rugby union)

== See also ==
- Frank Clarke (disambiguation)
- Francis Clark (disambiguation)
