= Wolfe Wagner =

William Wolfe Wagner was an Irish Anglican clergyman.

Wagner was educated at Trinity College, Dublin and ordained in 1887. After Curacies in Kileevan and Drumreilly, he was the incumbent at Kilmactranny from 1893 until 1910. He was Archdeacon of Elphin from then until his death in 1937.
