= St Michael on Greenhill, Lichfield =

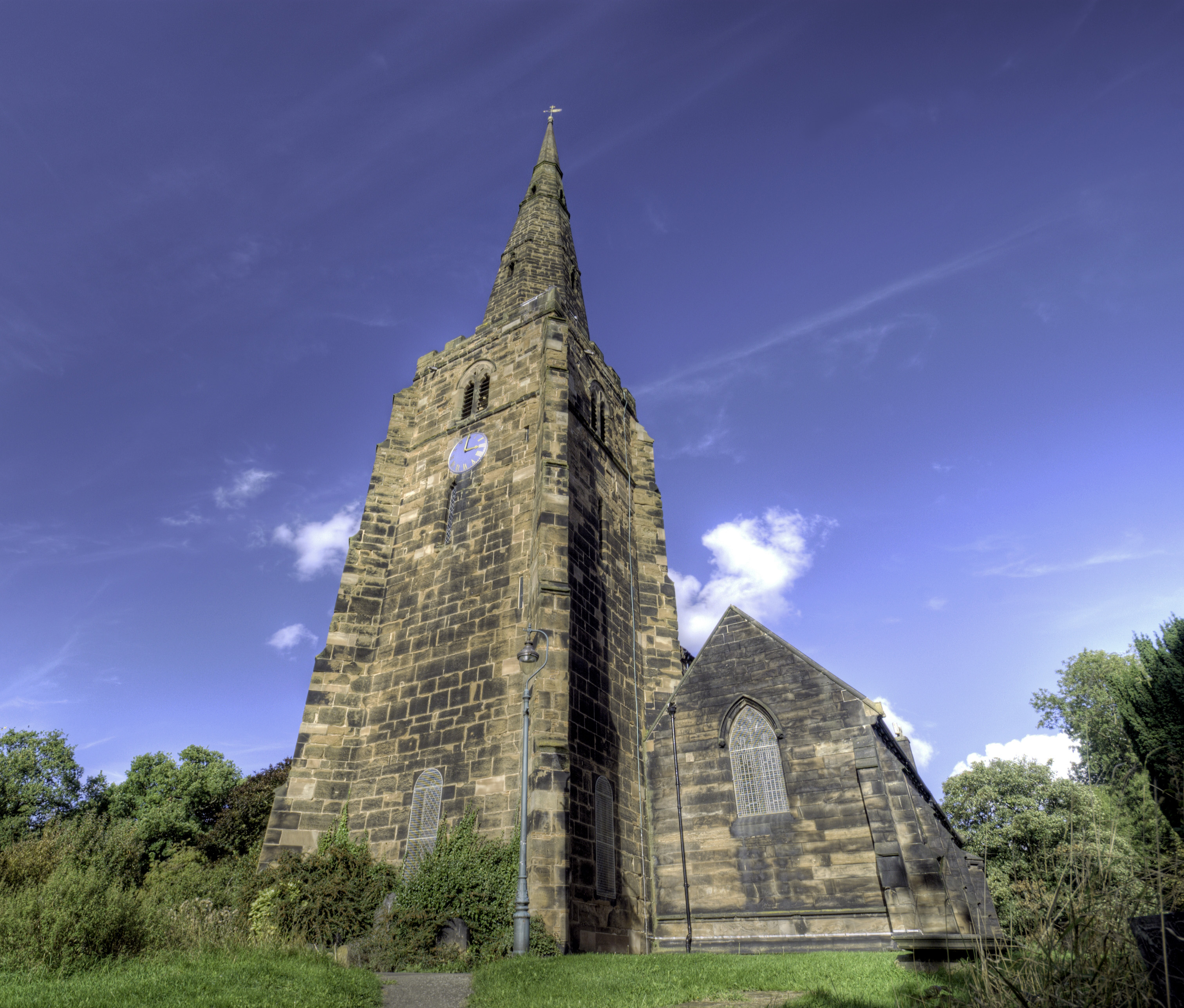
- St Michael on Greenhill, Lichfield
- 52.683283°N 1.818300°W
- OS grid reference: SK 12381 09510
- Location: Lichfield, Staffordshire
- Country: England
- Denomination: Anglican

Architecture
- Functional status: Active
- Heritage designation: Grade II*
- Architect: Thomas Johnson
- Style: Early English, Gothic
- Completed: 1843

Administration
- Province: Canterbury
- Diocese: Lichfield
- Parish: Lichfield

Clergy
- Rector: Revd Dr Abbie Walsh
- Vicar: Revd Linda Collins

St Michael on Greenhill is a parish church in Lichfield, Staffordshire in England, located on the high ground of Greenhill east of the city. A church has been on the present site since at least 1190 but the current building was the structure from the restoration of 1842–43. The churchyard is one of five ancient burial grounds in England and is one of the largest churchyards in the country at 9 acres (36,000 m^{2}).

The church is Grade II* listed; four of the monuments in the churchyard are separately listed Grade II.

== History ==
=== Ancient burial ground ===
The church lies on a sandstone ridge at 104 metres (341 ft) above sea level, and it overlooks the city to the west. The land on which the church is located owes much of its ancient history to its hilltop location.

St Michael's Church at Greenhill is first recorded in 1190, but the area on which it stands has a much older history. Mesolithic flint remains have been unearthed in the churchyard and may indicate the site of an early flint industry. These remains indicate the site on which St Michael's churchyard now stands was one of the earliest settlement in Lichfield.

Before the church was built, the site served as a significant religious place for burial. It is one of five ancient burial grounds in England. Local lore relates that it was consecrated by Saint Augustine and that the presence of this ancient site in Mercia drew Saint Chad to Lichfield and ensured that it became the centre of the new diocese. Evidence of its ancient roots can be found in the presence of crouched burials, a type of burial more common before the Norman Conquest.

Speculation about the churchyard's large size of 7 acres (28,000 m^{2}) (increased to 9 acres (36,000 m^{2}) in the 20th century) suggested that it had been the burial place of early Christians, victims of a supposed massacre of the followers of the apocryphal Saint Amphibalus. Another suggestion made it a Mercian tribal necropolis. Its size may merely reflect its function as the principal graveyard for the city and the surrounding areas.

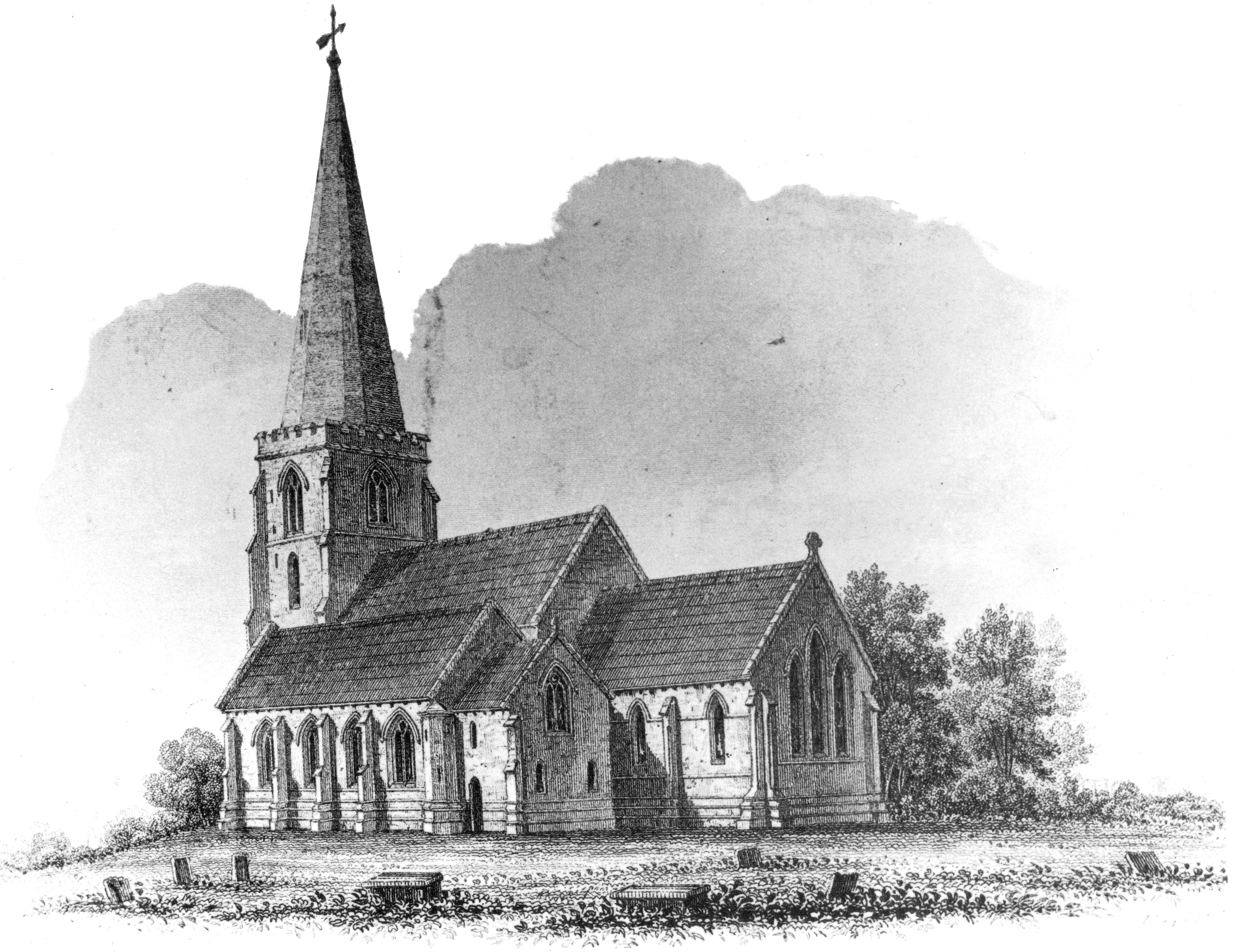
The church in 1845, after restoration

=== Medieval church ===
The earliest church on the site was first recorded in 1190 and may have been a small cemetery chapel. But the oldest remaining parts of the current church date from the 13th century in the form of some masonry in the chancel. The church register dates from 1574.

The west tower was constructed in the 15th century with local red sandstone. The tower is perpendicular in style and has a recessed spire. The spire was blown down in 1594 and in 1601 money was spent rebuilding the tower and topping it with a weathercock.

From the 16th century the churchyard at St Michael's was used as pastureland for sheep and cattle owned by the parishioners of St Michael's. This practice continued into the 19th century when it stopped and allowed nature to reclaim the area.

=== Current building ===
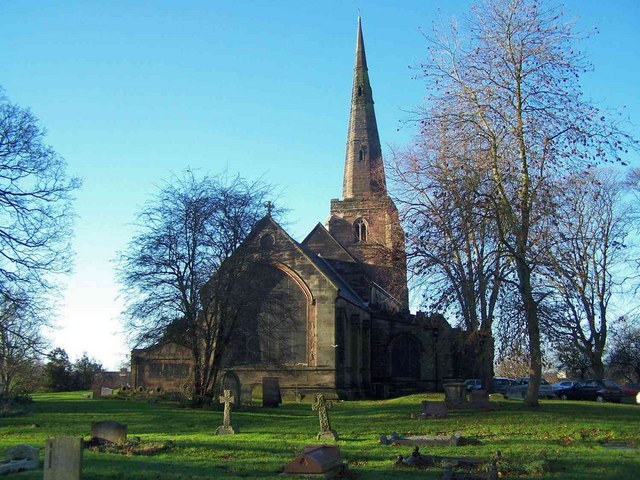
St Michael's Church east end

Much of the medieval fabric of the church was lost when the church was restored in 1842-43 under the design of Thomas Johnson (a local architect). The work included the re-roofing of the nave, the repair of the side aisles and the nave clerestory, the reintroduction of perpendicular windows in the north aisle, the rebuilding of the north porch, and the remodelling of the south aisle with new buttresses and a south door in place of a window. The mausoleum and the vestry room were replaced by a stokehole over which a clergy vestry was built with doors into the chancel and the south aisle and an organ loft was built over the vestry. A clock was installed onto the tower in 1814.

In 1845 and 1846 the chancel was restored to the design of Sydney Smirke. The east window was turned into a three-light window, all the side windows became single lancets, and the clerestory was removed. In the late 1870s, a stone pulpit was erected, and in the mid-1880s new seating was installed.

Extensive work was carried out in 1890–91 to the design of John Oldrid Scott. The chancel was restored and refurbished. The tower was repaired and the internal lancet window unblocked. In 1906 the spire was restored and a new vane erected after being damaged by a storm. A new vestry in the south-east angle of the church was dedicated in 1923.

== Notable features ==
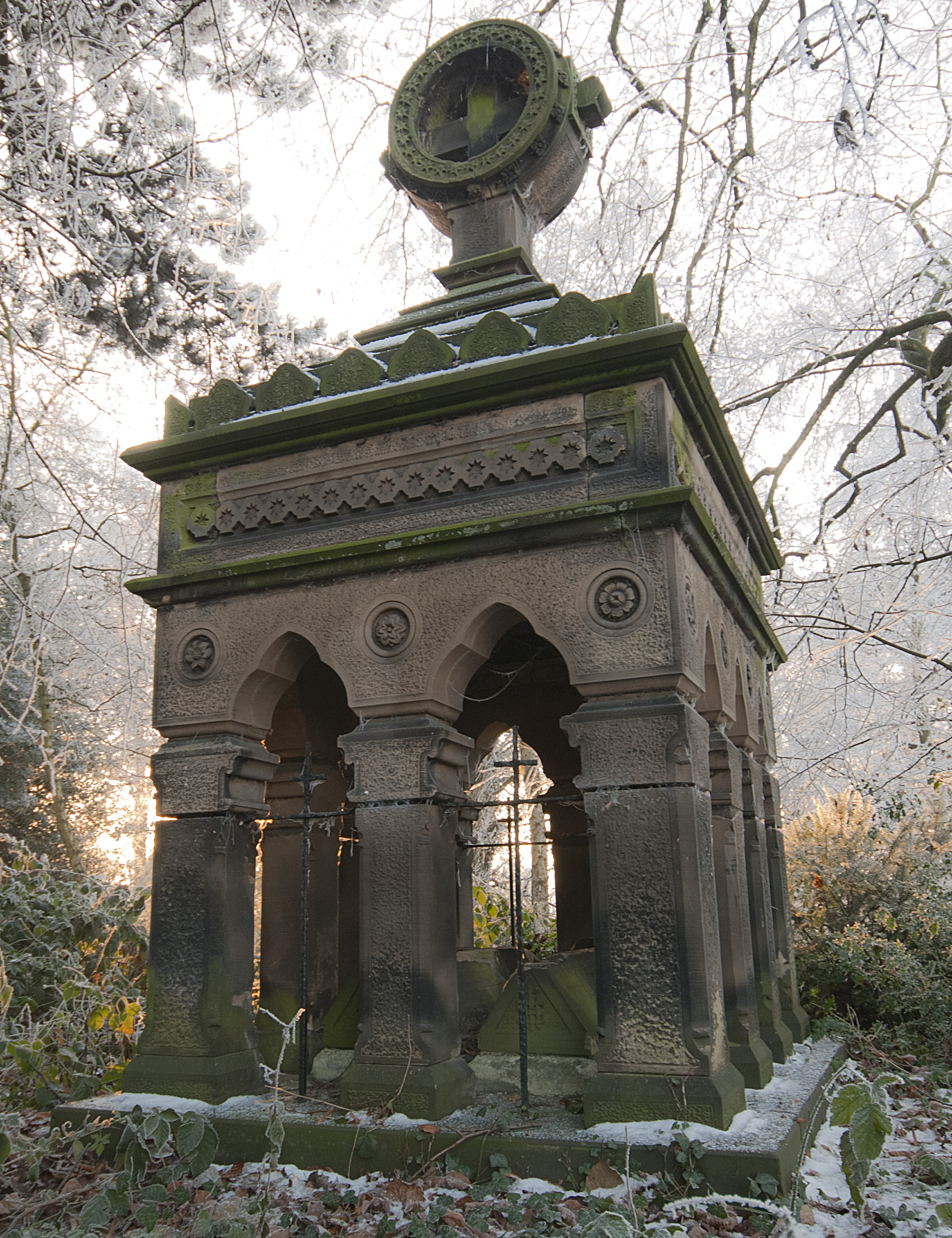
Mausoleum of James Thomas Law

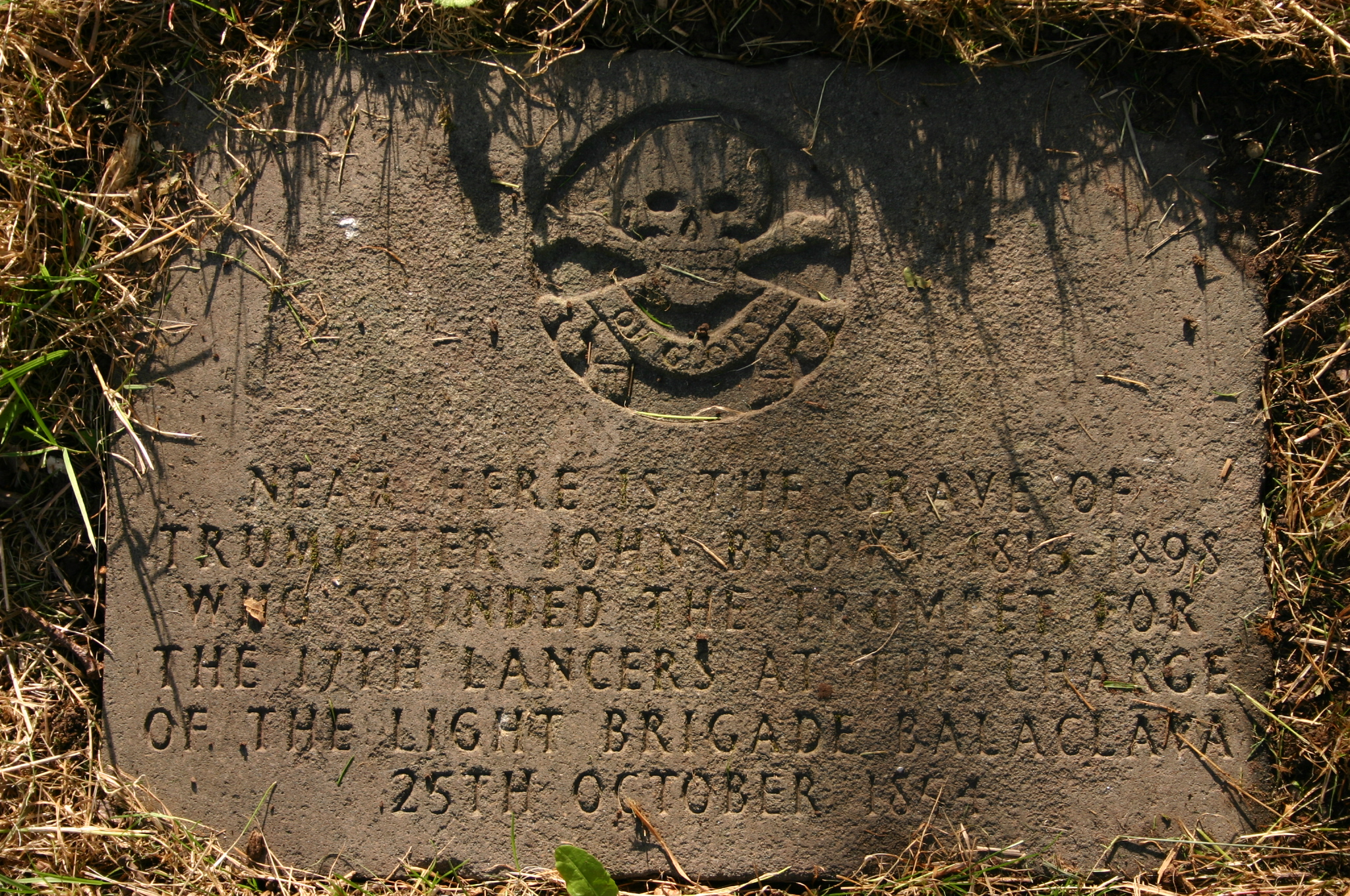
The grave of John Brown trumpeter from the Charge of the Light Brigade

- In the centre of the nave is a floor slab commemorating Samuel Johnson's father Michael (d. 1731), his mother Sarah (d. 1759), and his brother Nathaniel (d. 1737), all of whom were buried in the church. It was placed there in 1884 to mark the centenary of Johnson's own death. The inscription on it is that composed by Johnson for an earlier stone which he ordered a few days before he died. That original stone was removed when the church was repaved in the late 1790s. Richard Greene, a relation of Dr Johnson's and senior bailiff in Lichfield, did a lot to contribute to the city's history. At Dr Johnson's request he supervised the erection of the monument to Johnson's parents and brother.
- Over the chancel arch are the royal arms of Queen Anne (1702–14). After the Restoration it was compulsory for each church to display heraldic witness to their loyalty to the crown.
- The font dates from 1669 and is octagonal with stylised fleur-de-lis and Tudor roses.
- In a recess in the north wall of the chancel under the pointed arch is the tomb of William de Walton, who in 1344 was the first recorded benefactor of St Michael's.
- In the chancel is an effigy of a man in civilian dress, said to be a 14th-century lawyer.
- There were three bells in 1552. A peal of six was cast by Abraham Rudhall of Gloucester in 1722 or 1723. The third and fourth bells were recast in 1919 by James Barwell Ltd. of Birmingham.
- In the churchyard is the grave of Trumpeter John Brown, who sounded the trumpet for the 17th Lancers at the Charge of the Light Brigade.
- The gravestone of John Neve, William Wightman and James Jackson is in the churchyard. These men were found guilty of forgery and were hanged at the gallows at the junction of Tamworth Road and London Road in the last public hanging in Lichfield. The gravestone only denotes the initials of the three men and the date reads June 1, 1810. It was recently restored after being found fallen over and covered in moss.
- The mausoleum of James Thomas Law (1790–1876), chancellor of the Lichfield diocese, is built at the northern edge of the churchyard. Initially built for his wife who died in 1864, it resembles a canopied medieval tomb. The structure was surmounted by a clock with two dials which were illuminated at night by gas. Built on the side of the Trent Valley Road it served as a reminder of the time to travellers on their way to the railway station. The clock is now missing and the mausoleum is overgrown with vegetation. The mausoleum is a Grade II Listed Building.
- There are two other Grade II listed monuments and one listed headstone, to Mary Gregory (d. 1687) in the churchyard.
- Screen Wall Memorial, erected by Commonwealth War Graves Commission, commemorating 35 service personnel of World War I and of World War II, who are buried in the churchyard.

== Present ==
The church is still an active parish church within the local community. The former parishes of St Mary's and St Michael's were joined to form a single parish with St Michael's as the parish church and St Mary's designated as a Chapel of Ease. Together with St John's at Wall it forms a group of churches known as the United Benefice. Regular services take place on Sundays, Tuesdays and Wednesdays. Weddings, baptisms and funerals also take place at the church as well as a regular Sunday school.

The churchyard is now preserved as a wildlife area.

The rectory was built to the south west of the church in the 1970s on St Michael's Road replacing one built in 1858. The new house remains the rectory house for the combined benefice.

== See also ==
- Grade II* listed buildings in Lichfield (district)
- Listed buildings in Lichfield
