= Francis Clark =

Francis Clark may refer to:

- Francis J. Clark (1912–1981), United States Army soldier
- Francis Edward Clark (1851–1927), American clergyman
- Francis Clark of the Clark baronets
- Francis Clark (1799–1853), silversmith and magistrate in Birmingham, England, founder of South Australian company Francis Clark and Sons

== See also ==
- Francis Clarke (disambiguation)
- Francis Clark Howell (1925–2007), American anthropologist
- Francis Clerke (disambiguation)
- Frank Clark (disambiguation)
- Frank Clarke (disambiguation)
