= Frank Clarke (cricketer) =

Welsh cricketer (1936–2026)

Personal information
- Born: 8 October 1936; Cardiff, Glamorgan, Wales
- Died: 17 August 2026 (aged 89); Worthing, West Sussex, England
- Batting: Right-handed
- Bowling: Right-arm fast-medium

Domestic team information
- Years: Team
- 1956–1960: Glamorgan

Career statistics
| Competition | First-class |
|---|---|
| Matches | 31 |
| Runs scored | 98 |
| Batting average | 3.76 |
| 100s/50s | 0/0 |
| Top score | 31 |
| Balls bowled | 3,828 |
| Wickets | 50 |
| Bowling average | 37.36 |
| 5 wickets in innings | 1 |
| 10 wickets in match | 0 |
| Best bowling | 5/66 |
| Catches/stumpings | 10/– |
- Source: Cricinfo, 3 September 2026

Frank Clarke (8 October 1936 – 17 August 2026) was a Welsh cricketer. Clarke was a right-arm fast-medium bowler and tail-end right-handed batsman.

Clarke made his first-class debut for Glamorgan against the Combined Services at Cardiff Arms Park in 1956. He went on to make 30 further first-class appearances for the county, the last of which came against the touring South Africans in 1960. Primarily a bowler, Clarke took 50 first-class wickets at an average of 37.36, with best figures of 5/66 against Middlesex at Lord's in the 1959 County Championship. With the bat, he scored a total of 98 runs at a batting average of 3.76, with a high score of 31. This score, which came against the touring Indians in 1959, accounted for 32% of his entire career runs. Injury forced Clarke to retire after the 1960 season.

After his cricket career ended, Clarke moved to Sussex, where he worked as a carpenter and cabinet maker. He died in Worthing, West Sussex, on 17 August 2026, aged 89.
