= Micronekton =

Organism able to swim independently of ocean currents

A micronekton is a group of organisms of 2 to 20 cm in size which are able to swim independently of ocean currents. The word 'nekton' is derived from the Greek νήκτον, translit. nekton, meaning "to swim", and was coined by Ernst Haeckel in 1890.

== Overview ==
Micronekton organisms are ubiquitous in the world's oceans and they can be divided into broad taxonomic groups. The distinction between micronekton and micro-, meso- and macro- zooplankton is based on size. Micronekton typically ranges in size from 2 to 20 cm, macro-zooplankton from 2 mm to 2 cm, meso-zooplankton from 0.2 to 2 mm and micro-zooplankton from 20 μm to 0.2 mm. Micronekton represents 3.8-11.8 billion tons of mesopelagic fishes worldwide, approximately 380 million tons of Antarctic krill in the Southern Ocean and a global estimated biomass of at least 55 million tons of a single group of Ommastrephid squid. This diverse group assemblage is distributed between the sea surface and approximately 1000 m deep (in the mesopelagic zone). Micronekton shows a diverse range of migration patterns including diel vertical migration over several hundreds of metres from below 400 m (deeper layers) to the top 200 m (shallower layers) of the water column at dusk and inversely at dawn, reverse migration (organisms stay in the shallow layer during the day) mid-water migration (organisms stay in the intermediate layer, i.e. between 200 and 400 m) or non-migration (organisms stay in the deep layer at night and shallow layer during the day). Micronekton plays a key role in the oceanic biological pump by transporting organic carbon from the euphotic zone to deeper parts of the oceans It is also preyed upon by various predators such as tunas, billfishes, sharks, marine birds and marine mammals.

== Taxonomic groups ==
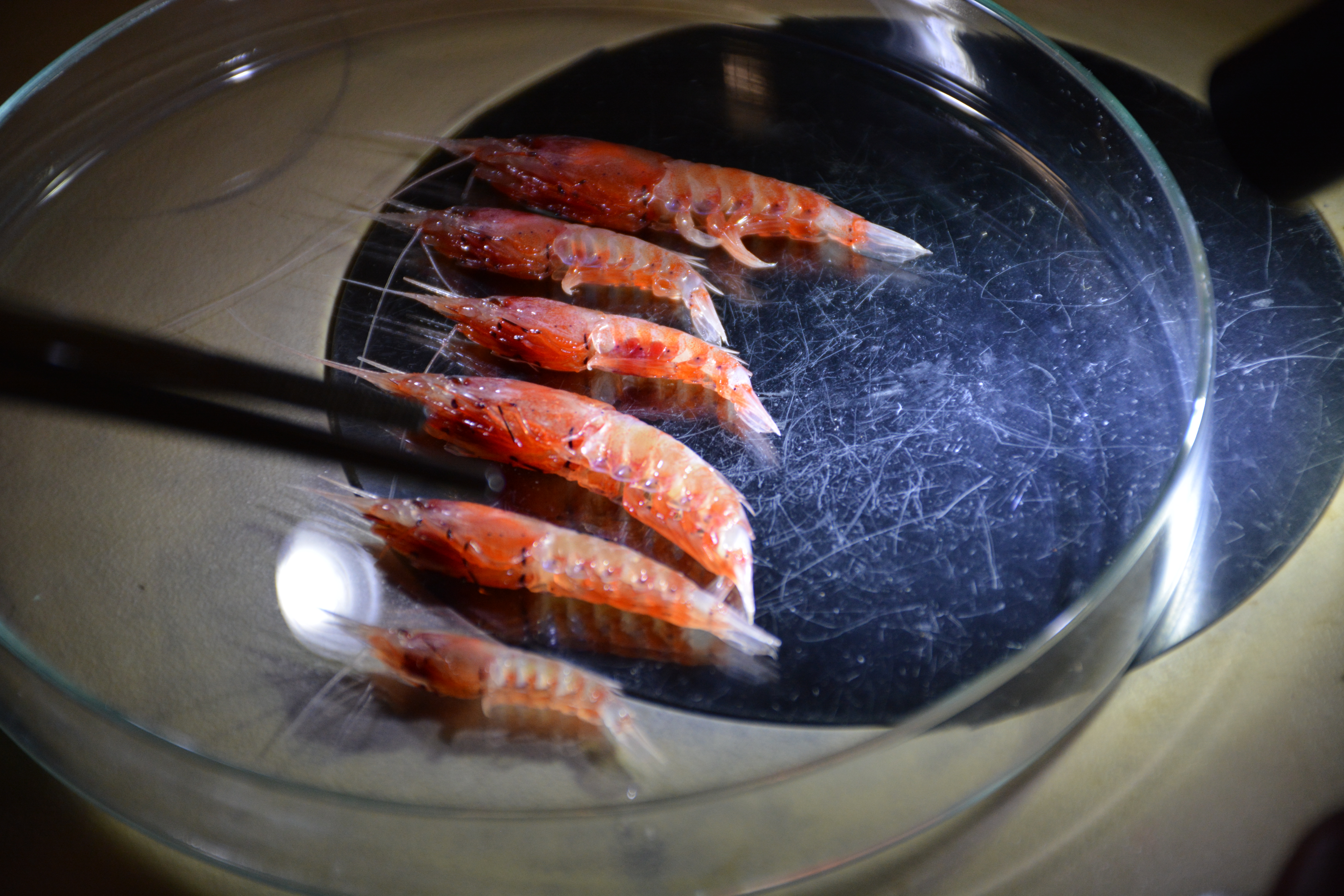

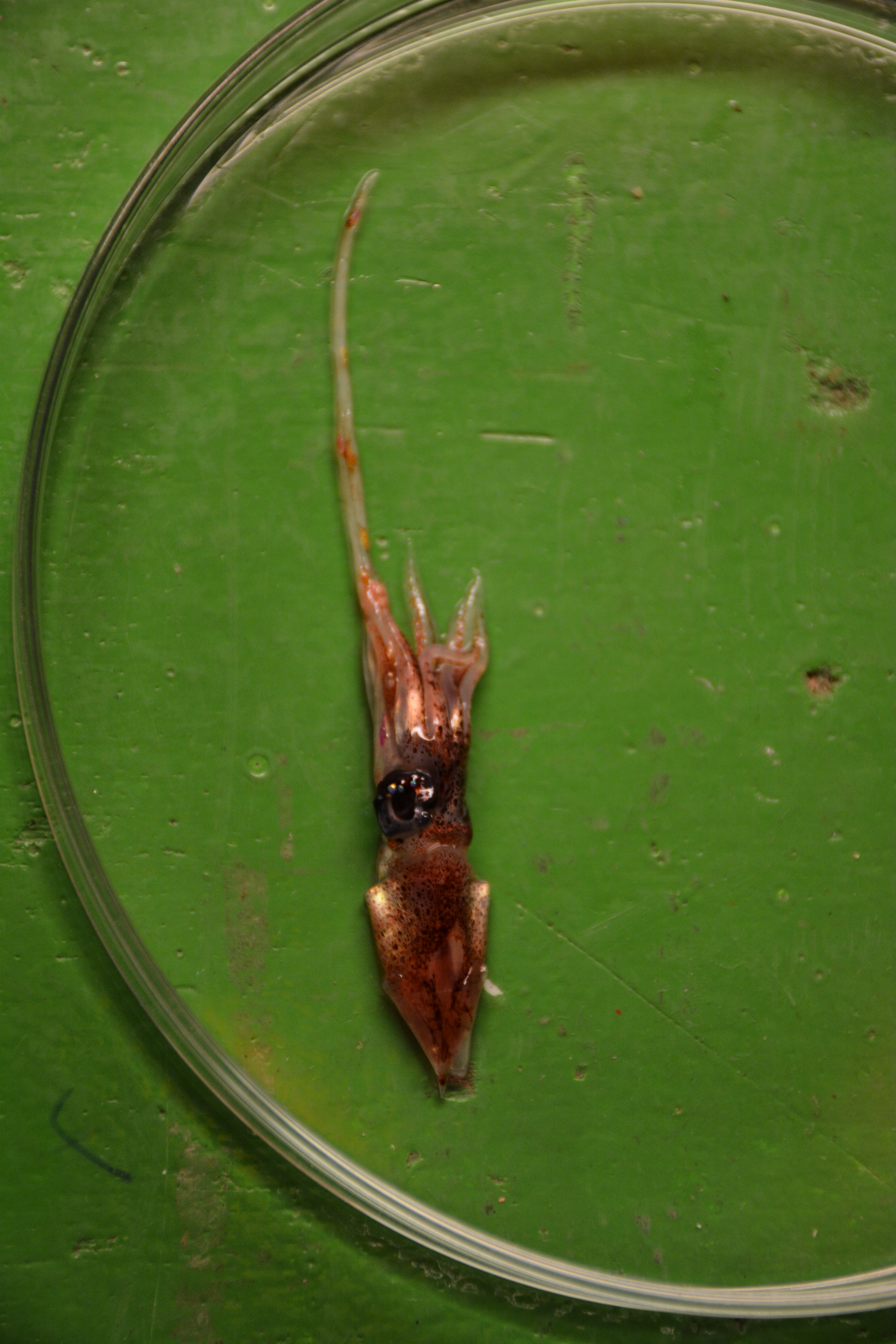
Abraliopsis sp.

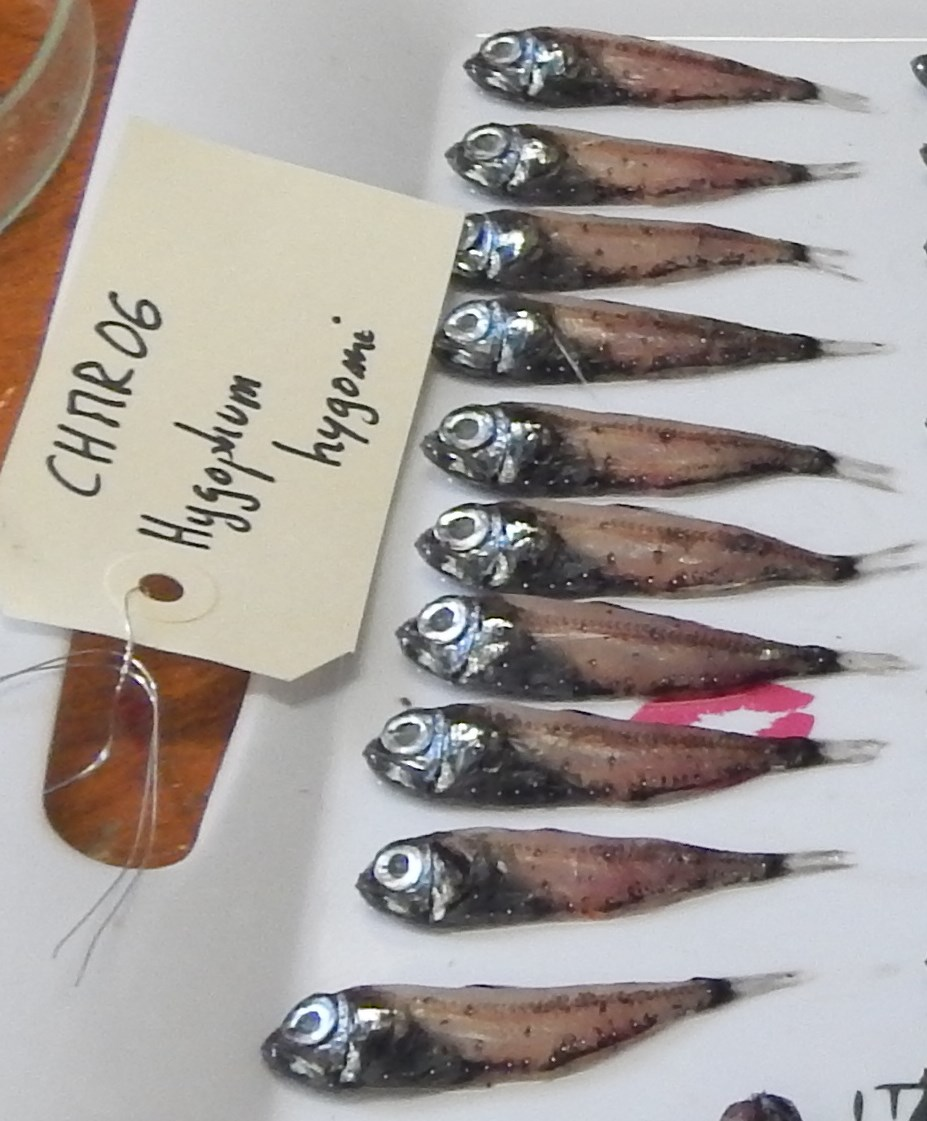
Lanternfish - Hygophum hygomii

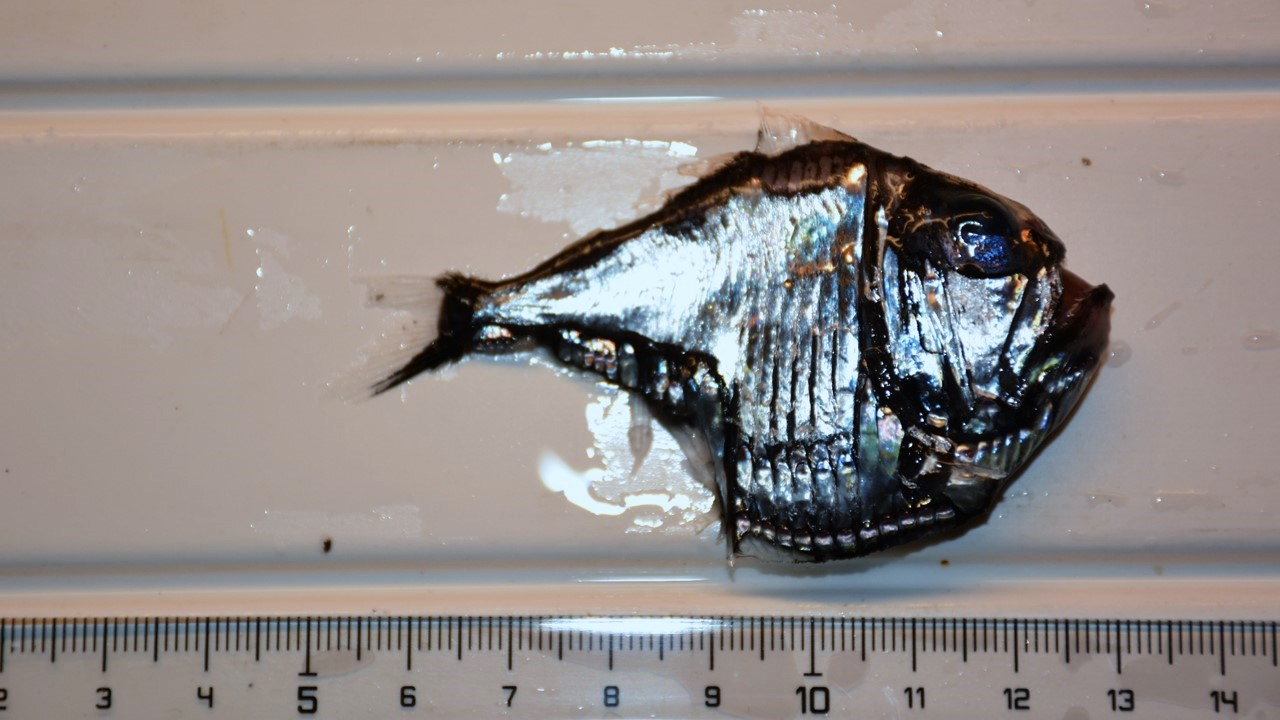
Hatchetfish - Argyropelecus aculeatus

Generally, the taxonomy of global existing micronekton is not yet complete due to the paucity of faunal surveys, net avoidance (organisms sensing the approach of the net and swimming out of its path) and escapement (animals escape through the meshes after entering the net), and gear in-adaptability. New species are continually being discovered and described in new regions of the world's oceans.

Crustaceans are highly diverse, with a single group, the decapods, consisting of 15,000 species in around 2,700 genera. Euphausiids consist of 10 genera with a total of 85 species. Hyperiids are also widely distributed in the world's oceans with approximately 233 species across 72 genera.

Cephalopods comprise less than 1000 species distributed across 43 families. They occur in all marine habitats such as benthic, burrowing on coral reefs, grass flats, sand, mud, rocks; are epibenthic, pelagic and epipelagic in bays, seas and the open ocean.

Bristlemouths (Gonostomatidae), largely Cyclothone, account for more than 50% of the total vertebrate abundance between 100 and 1000 m. Twenty-one species of bristlemouths have been described globally. Lanternfishes are the secondmost abundant marine vertebrates, having diversified into 252 species.

Hatchetfishes (Sternoptychidae) and dragonfishes (Stomiidae) are other common mesopelagic taxa in the deep-sea environment.

== Anatomy and physiology ==
=== Crustaceans ===
The crustacean body is divided into three sections: head, thorax and tail. They typically have 2 antennae and a varying number of pairs of thoracic legs called pereiopods (or thoracopods). Crustacean species such as Systelaspis debilis and Oplophorus spinosus have specific visual pigments thought to facilitate congener recognition. The oplophorid genera Systellaspis, Acanthephyra and Oplophorus secrete luminous fluids as part of their distress response.

=== Cephalopods ===
Cephalopods are soft-bodied animals with a cranium and, in most forms, a mantle/fin (cuttlebone or gladius) as primary skeletal features. They have highly developed central nervous systems with well-organized eyes. Cephalopods can be divided into four main groups: squids, cuttlefishes, octopuses and chambered nautiluses, which have distinguishable morphological features. Squids can have chromatic vision through the presence of various visual pigments.

=== Mesopelagic fishes ===
Few anatomical and physiological studies of mesopelagic fishes have been conducted, except for research of the swimbladder of these organisms. The deepest-living mesopelagic fishes have no swimbladder. Most species inhabiting the upper mesopelagic zone have gas-filled swimbladders (which aid in buoyancy). Other species have a gas-filled swimbladder when young which becomes filled with fat with age. Polyunsaturated wax esters are common in muscle or adipose tissue of lanternfishes, posing an obstacle to human consumption.

Lanternfishes possess retina with a single pigment capable of absorbing bioluminescent light ranging from 480 to 492 nm at a distance of up to 30 m in the deep ocean.

=== Bioluminescence ===
Bioluminescence is the production and emission of light from a living organism as a result of a natural chemical reaction, typically the molecular decomposition of luciferin substrates by the luciferase enzyme in the presence of oxygen. Bioluminescence in animals is used to communicate, defend against predation, and find or attract prey. It is mainly generated endogenously (e.g. photophores of lanternfishes) or through bacterially-mediated symbiosis (e.g. most anglerfish lures, flashlightfish subocular organs), within teleosts. It is common in micronekton (including many types of planktonic crustaceans, mesopelagic fishes such as myctophids/lanternfishes and stomiiformes, and squids).

Many mesopelagic species (midwater squids, fish and shrimps) have counter shading ventral bioluminescent photophores which serve to match the intensity of downwelling light so as to hide from predators lurking below. To conceal itself with bioluminescence, the animal must precisely match its luminescence to the intensity, angular distribution and color of the downwelling light.

Stomiiformes have barbels, ventral arrays, and red and blue suborbital photophores. Lanternfishes have also developed lateral photophores on the sides of their bodies (for species recognition) and sexually dimorphic luminescent organs on the tail or head. The sexual dimorphism of bioluminescent signalling and sensory systems may help facilitate sexual encounters in the deep ocean. At the onset of sexual maturity, secondary light organs develop in some of the arms of certain female squids e.g. cranchiids (Liocranchia and Leachia pacifica) for use in sexual recognition. Females of the octopod Japetella develop a ring of bioluminescent tissue around their mouth just prior to mating and this tissue atrophies once the eggs are spent. In the squid Ctenopteryx siculus, males develop a large photophore within the posterior region of their body at sexual maturity. Bioluminescent signaling by micronekton also carries some degree of risk for it may expose the organism to a predator.

== Ecology ==
=== Foraging patterns ===
Crustaceans show omnivorous feeding patterns since they prey on zooplankton, such as euphausiids and copepods, and are also known for occasional herbivory. All squids have carnivorous foraging patterns. Most mesopelagic fishes are carnivores. Some mesopelagic fishes, for example Ceratoscopelus warmingii, have some herbivorous feeding strategies, and can thus be classified as omnivores. Mesopelagic fishes mostly feed at night or dusk, with a few species being acyclic.

=== Role in food webs ===
Micronekton plays an important role in oceanic food webs by connecting top predators such as tunas and billfishes to lower trophic level zooplankton. Crustaceans, cephalopods and mesopelagic fishes generally have overlapping isotopic niche widths suggesting some degree of similarity in their diet with low level of resource partitioning and a high level of competition among these broad categories. In low productive environments, predators such as swordfish were shown to forage on larger-sized squids since micronekton prey density is reduced and the costs associated with finding prey are higher than the energy intake when consuming smaller-sized micronekton. Crustaceans and mesopelagic fishes generally occupy trophic level 3, smaller-sized squids occupy trophic level 3 to 4 and large nektonic squids such as Ommastrephes bartramii occupy trophic level 5.

== Behaviour ==
=== Swarming ===
Crustaceans, such as krill, may form several aggregation types, from high to low densities distributed throughout the water column, that are influenced by current velocities, direction, mean depth, and predator foraging. Cephalopods may form large schools of neritic and oceanic species with millions of individuals, or small schools with a few dozens of individuals or may be found as isolated territorial individuals. Some mesopelagic fishes form schools or are aggregated in scattering layers while others are dispersed

=== Swimming ===
Krill individuals of 45.4 mm in length can maintain horizontal sustained swimming speeds of 0.2 cm s^{−1} and are able to swim into currents for several hours at speeds of 0.17 cm s^{−1}. Krill are able to dart rapidly backwards to escape predators. Cephalopods such as Illex illecebrosus are able to swim continuously. During daytime, mesopelagic fish often hang motionless in the water column with head up or down in a state of torpor. Myctophids have sustained swimming speeds of approximately 75 cm s^{−1}, with larger individuals having higher rates than smaller ones. At night, fishes in the upper layers of the water column are active and swim horizontally, while those which stayed at depth are immobile and vertically oriented. Mesopelagic fishes are capable of rapid evasive movements to escape predators.

However, crustaceans, cephalopods and mesopelagic fishes can adapt their swimming speeds, with the fastest swimming during escape, intermediate during foraging and lowest speed during migration:

Swimming speeds (cm s^{−1})	Crustaceans	Cephalopods	Mesopelagic fishes
During escape	20 to 50	20 to 70	20 to 50
During foraging	2 to 10	30	2.5 to 30
During migration	0.5 to 3	1 to 3	1.5 to 10

=== Reproduction and growth rate ===
Sexual differences in gonads of krill first occur in subadults (> 24 mm), and secondary sexual (external) characteristics develop progressively in the late sub-adult stage (35 mm for females and 43 mm or larger for males). The reproductive cycle of krill usually spans from December to April.

Cephalopods have a wide range of reproductive strategies and may spawn once or more than once, with the latter including: (1) polycyclic spawning, with eggs laid in separate batches during the spawning season and growth between the production of egg batches, (2) multiple spawning, with group-synchronous ovulation, monocyclic spawning and growth between egg batches, (3) intermittent terminal spawning, with group-synchronous ovulation, monocyclic spawning and no growth between egg batches, (4) continuous spawning, with asynchronous ovulation, monocyclic spawning and growth between egg batches. Cephalopods typically grow fast and mature rapidly, with their life cycle generally terminating with reproduction.

The age of mesopelagic fishes can be determined from their otoliths and their growth rate can be calculated from the von Bertalanffy growth equation. Most mesopelagic fishes become sexually mature one year after hatching in highly productive areas, and more than two years in low productive areas. Most tropical myctophids and smaller gonostomatids are believed to have a one-year life cycle compared to mesopelagic fishes from colder waters which have a longer life cycle. In temperate and subtropical regions, myctophids spawn mainly from late winter to summer. The spawning season for Gonostomatids differ among species, with Sigmops elongatus spawning in spring and summer, Gonostoma ebelingi in early fall, Gonostoma atlanticum during all seasons in the subtropical central Pacific, and Gonostoma gracile in fall and winter in the western Pacific. Other mesopelagic fishes such Maurolicus muelleri, Vinciguerria nimbaria and Vinciguerria poweriae spawn mainly in spring and summer.

=== Vertical and horizontal distributions ===
==== Vertical migration ====
The vertical migration patterns of micronekton are species dependent. Most micronekton show an extensive diel vertical migration whereby they are concentrated below 400 m of the water column during the day and migrate to the top 200 m at dusk, and they migrate in the opposite direction to below 400 m at dawn. Diel vertical migration of the mesopelagic community represents one of the Earth's largest daily animal migrations. The change in light intensity is believed to be the stimulus for triggering this vertical movement, with the main biological reason being enhanced foraging opportunities at the surface and decreased predation at night than in daytime. Migrant micronekton may be following the movements of their main prey which undergo diel vertical migration at dusk. Upward and downward migrations seem to occur in a series of events by different micronekton groups, with for example, smaller fishes which swim at smaller speeds leaving their location first than larger fishes.

Other micronekton species, however, are non-migrating or weakly migrating and hence stay below 400 m depth at dusk, for e.g., members of the Cyclothone genus and some sternoptychids. Mid-water migration, i.e., migration to the lower limit of the shallow scattering layer (at approximately 200 m depth) at nighttime and back to 400 m before daytime, is also seen in some taxa.

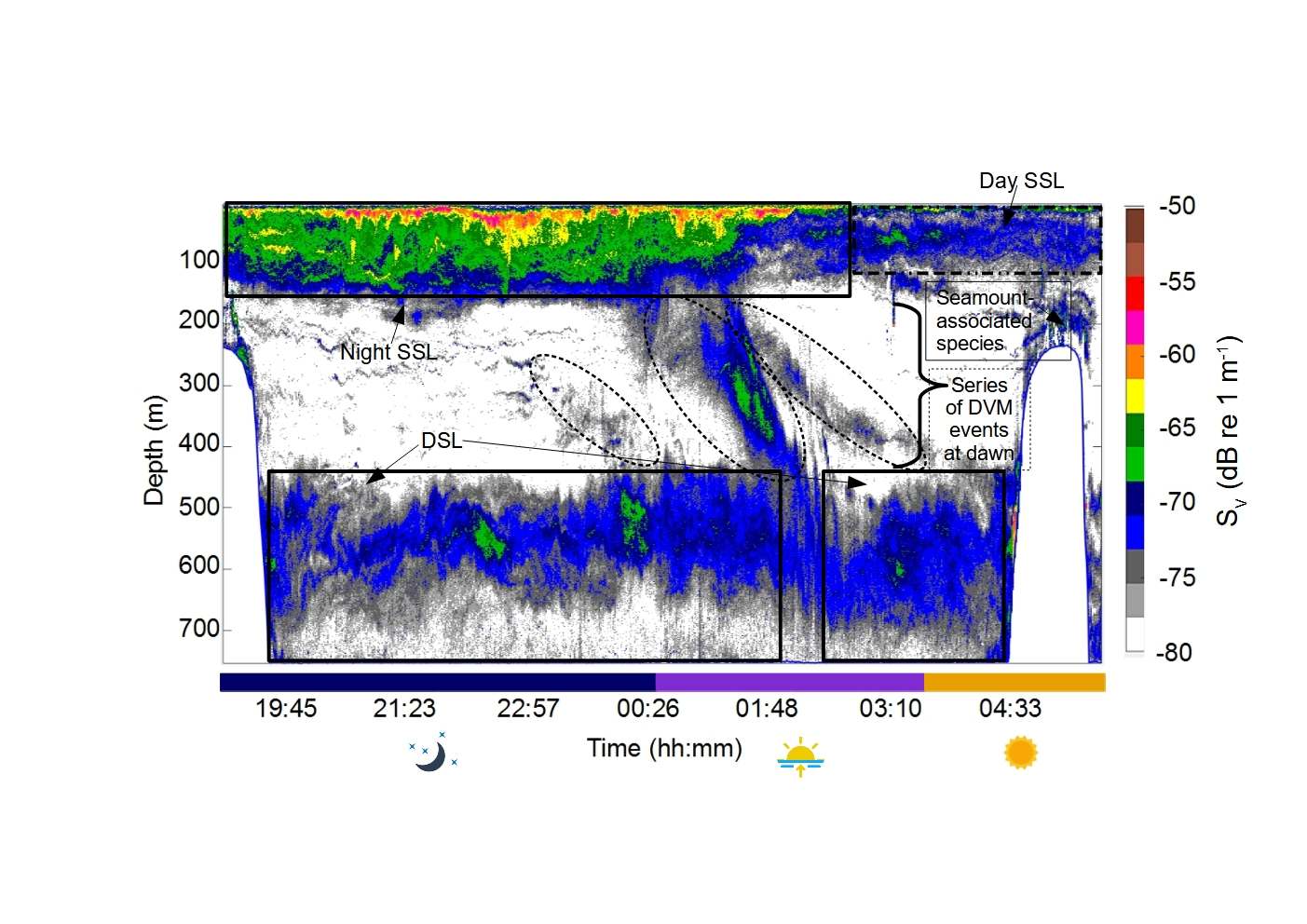
Diagram showing the dense shallow scattering layer (SSL) and weak deep scattering layer (DSL) at night. Diel vertical migration (DVM) occurs as a series of events from the surface (top 100 m) or the intermediate layer (approximately 200 m), to the deeper parts of the ocean (below 400 m). Micronekton species are associated with the MAD-Ridge seamount summit and flanks in the Indian Ocean.

==== Ontogenic vertical migration ====
Almost all mesopelagic species are believed to change their vertical distribution range during their life history, with younger individuals generally inhabiting shallower depths than older ones.

==== Horizontal distribution ====
The distributional patterns of micronekton generally seem to coincide with water mass distribution, mesoscale oceanographic processes such as eddies, and presence of seamounts. Micronekton showed reverse migration patterns, being located in the top 200 m of the water column during daytime, in a cyclonic mesoscale eddy in the South West Indian Ocean. Cyclonic eddies also showed greater micronekton densities than anti-cyclonic eddies. Mesoscale cyclonic eddies may hence create favorable conditions, such as enhanced foraging opportunities, for micronekton.

Most micronekton species are oceanic but neritic patterns have also been observed. Some micronekton taxa, such as Diaphus suborbitalis, preferentially associate with seamounts. Large populations of D. suborbitalis have been reported off the slopes of the Equator, La Pérouse and MAD-Ridge seamounts in the Indian Ocean. They are located at depths around the seamounts' flanks during the day, and ascend in dense schools to the upper portion of the flanks and over the summits at dusk.

Fishes may interact with seamounts in different ways:

1. Diurnal vertically migrating organisms to the surface layer at dusk and being advected to the seamount summit by surface currents,
2. weakly migrant/ non-migrant fishes that are not able to counter strong currents and are hence advected over the benthopelagic zone around seamounts,
3. adults of meso- and bathypelagic species that live over seamount summits to increase their feeding efficiency, and reduce predation risks,
4. "pseudo-oceanic" or "nerito-pelagic" species that preferentially associate with seamounts and resist advection off the pinnacles.

Some micronekton taxa may show the "feed-rest" hypothesis, whereby they would rest in the quiescent shelter offered by the seamount topography and sense the environment around the seamount to take advantage of the flow-advected prey, while avoiding advective loss by strong currents. Some cephalopod species may use seamounts as spawning and foraging grounds.

== Nutritional value ==
The high protein and low-fat content of cephalopods make them interesting components in human diets. Mesopelagic fishes are good sources of "Omega-3" n-3 PUFA (polyunsaturated fatty acids), EPA (icosapentaenoic acid) and DHA (docosahexaenoic acid), making them attractive candidates as dietary supplements for human consumption, as fishmeal in aquaculture farms, or for use as nutraceuticals.

== Trace element concentrations ==
Compared to pelagic species such as tuna, sharks, and marine mammals, trace element concentrations in micronekton have been poorly studied. Trace elements are defined as those occurring in trace amounts (typically < 0.01% of the organism), and excluding the macronutrients calcium, magnesium, potassium and sodium. Some trace elements, such as iron, manganese, selenium, and zinc are essential to the normal functioning of an organism. Cadmium, lead, and mercury, however, are non-essential elements (i.e., with no known biological function). Other elements such as copper, zinc and selenium, are important in metabolic processes but toxic in high doses. Trace elements, such as mercury, can bioaccumulate to harmful levels when they are stored in tissues of organisms faster than they can be detoxified and/or excreted. Marine vertebrates have specific proteins, metallothionein, which bind trace elements such as cadmium, copper and zinc when in excess. The trace element selenium may reduce the availability of methylmercury by sequestering mercury, thus decreasing its toxicity.

Trace element concentrations vary between micronekton broad categories and between metals, with crustaceans having higher levels of arsenic, copper, and zinc, compared to mesopelagic fishes. Copper and zinc are both known to associate with the respiratory pigment hemocyanin in crustaceans. Cephalopods are known to bioaccumulate higher cadmium, copper and zinc concentrations in their digestive glands compared to fishes.

Myctophids sampled in the Indian Ocean and Gulf of California were enriched in iron, zinc and cobalt. The mesopelagic fishes Chauliodus sloani, Sigmops elongatus, and Ceratoscopelus warmingii of the South West Indian Ocean, and the Sulu, Celebes and Philippine Seas (South China), have similar range of values of arsenic, cadmium, cobalt, copper, chromium, manganese, lead, selenium, silver, and zinc, suggesting that these organisms have similar biochemical processes, irrespective of their location.

Some micronekton organisms showed trace element concentrations above the permitted levels determined by European and worldwide legislations, and will hence have to be regularly monitored for their trace element content so as not to pose a threat to human consumption.

== Commercial interests ==
There are growing interests in the commercial exploitation of micronekton for human consumption, as fishmeal in aquaculture farms and for nutraceutical products. Cephalopod fisheries already exist, targeting a wide range of species, and with more than half of the total catch taken in the northeast and northwest Pacific, and the northeast and northwest Atlantic. The fisheries target neritic and oceanic squids (e.g., Todarodes, Loligo, Illex, etc.), cuttlefish (e.g., Sepia, Sepiella, and allied genera), and octopuses (Octopus and Eledone).

The cephalopod fisheries use the following principal types of fishing methods and gear:

Family	Species	Distribution	Habitat	Fishing method
Ommastrephidae	Todarodes pacificus	Northwest Pacific 20°–60°N	Shelf and upper slope	Largely jigging with lights; some bottom trawling and purse seine
Ommastrephidae	Todarodes sagittatus	Eastern Atlantic 70°N–10°S	Neritic/Oceanic	Bycatch in trawls
Ommastrephidae	Nototodarus sloanii	New Zealand south of the Subtropical Convergence	Neritic/Oceanic	Jigging with lights and trawling
Ommastrephidae	Illex argentinus	Southwest Atlantic 22°–54°S	Shelf and upper slope	Largely jigging with lights; some bottom trawling
Ommastrephidae	Illex illecebrosus	Northwest Atlantic 25°–65°S	Shelf and upper slope	Jigging and bottom trawling
Ommastrephidae	Illex coindetii	Western Atlantic 5°–40°N and eastern Atlantic 20°S–60°N	Shelf and upper slope	Bycatch in trawls
Ommastrephidae	Ommastrephes bartramii	Circumglobal, bi-Subtropical 30°–60°N and 20°–50°S	Oceanic	Jigging with lights
Ommastrephidae	Dosidicus gigas	Eastern Pacific 50°N–50°S	Largely oceanic but extends over the narrow shelf of the western seaboard of the Americas	Jigging with lights
Ommastrephidae	Martialia hyadesi	Circumpolar, Antarctic Polar Frontal Zone north to Patagonian Shelf and New Zealand	Oceanic and over continental slope	Jigging with lights
Loliginidae	Doryteuthis (Loligo) gahi	South America, Gulf of Guayaquil to northern Patagonian Shelf	Shelf	Bottom trawls
Loliginidae	Doryteuthis (Loligo) opalescens	Western North and Central America, southern Alaska to Baja California	Shelf	drum seine; purse seine; brail net
Loliginidae	Doryteuthis (Loligo) pealeii	Eastern Americas, Newfoundland to Gulf of Venezuela	Shelf	Bottom trawls and trap nets
Loliginidae	Loligo reynaudii	Southern Africa	Shelf	Jigs
Loliginidae	Loligo forbesii	Eastern Atlantic, 20°–60°N and Mediterranean	Shelf	Trawls and around Madeira and Azores, jigs
Loliginidae	Sepioteuthis lessoniana	Indo-West Pacific, Japan to Northern Australia and New Zealand and to northern Red Sea and Mozambique/ Madagascar, Hawaii	Shelf	Trawls, traps, seines, jigs, hooks, spears, etc.
Onychoteuthidae	Onykia (Moroteuthis) ingens	Circumpolar sub-Antarctic north to Patagonian Shelf, central Chile, southern Australia, and North Island New Zealand	Benthic/pelagic	
Gonatidae	Berryteuthis magister	North Pacific from Sea of Japan to Southern California via Aleutians	Demersal on continental slope and mesopelagic	Trawl
Source: Arkhipkin et al. 2015

Interest in mesopelagic fish exploitation is also rapidly growing due to their sheer number and ubiquitous nature. The mesopelagic fish stock has been estimated at 20-100 billion tons with a potential yield of approximately 200 000 tons per year in the Arabian Sea, and a total global fish biomass of 2-19.5 gigatons between 70°N and 70°S. Catches of mesopelagic fishes for scientific surveys are made using various types of trawls (Isaacs-Kidd midwater trawl, Cobb trawl, rectangular midwater trawl, Hokkaido University Frame Trawl, International Young Gadoid Pelagic Trawl, etc.), with mouth areas of 1–10 m^{2}. Experiments have been conducted with commercial trawls having large mouth openings (100–1000 m^{2}) and large meshes (e.g., 20 cm) in the front part and gradually decreasing towards the codend. These commercial-sized trawls catch larger mesopelagic fishes but poorly sample small Cyclothone species.
