= Frank Clarke =

Frank Clarke is the name of:

== Politicians ==
- Frank G. Clarke (1850–1901), American politician and lawyer
- Frank Clarke (Victorian politician) (1879–1955), Australian politician
- Frank Clarke (British politician) (Frank Edward Clarke, 1886–1938), MP for Dartford

== Sportspeople ==
- Frank Clarke (American football) (Franklin Clarke, 1934–2018)
- Frank Clarke (footballer) (1942–2022), English football player
- Frank Clarke (triathlete), Canadian triathlete in 1992 ITU Triathlon World Championships
- Frank Clarke (cricketer) (born 1936), Welsh former cricketer

== Other people ==
- Frank Wigglesworth Clarke (1847–1931), American chemist and mineralogist
- Frank Clarke (pilot) (1898–1948), Hollywood stunt pilot
- Frank Clarke (editor) (1915–2002), British film editor
- Frank Edward Clarke (1849–1899), New Zealand ichthyologist and artist
- Frank Clarke (judge) (George Bernard Francis Clarke, born 1951), Irish former Supreme Court judge
- Frank L. Clarke (Francis L. Clarke, 1933–2020), Australian business economist

== See also ==
- Frank Clark (disambiguation)
- Francis Clarke (disambiguation)
