= Frank Clark Jr. =

American politician

Member of the Florida House of Representatives from Alachua County
- In office 1917

Personal details
- Party: Democratic

Frank Clark Jr. was an American politician. He served as a Democratic member of the Florida House of Representatives. Clark sponsored the bill that would lead to Florida enacting a prohibition against alcohol.
