= Frances Naomi Clark =

American ichthyologist

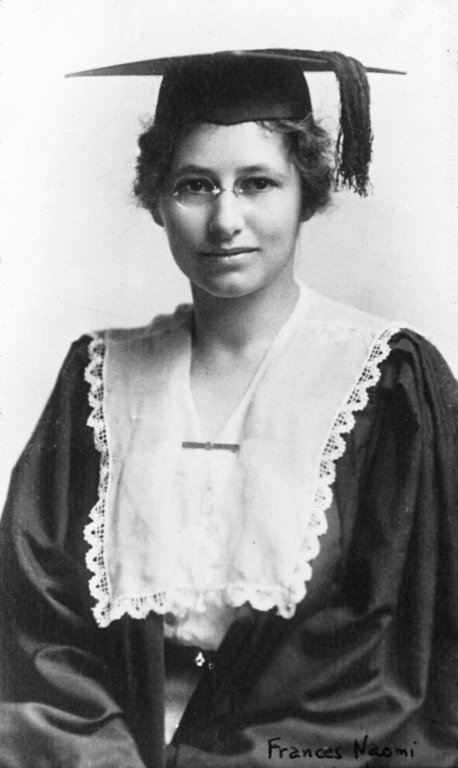
- Born: 1894
- Died: 1987 (aged 92–93)
- Education: Bachelor of Arts, Master of Science, Doctor of Philosophy
- Alma mater: University of Michigan
- Occupation: Ichthyologist; marine biologist
- Academic career
- Institutions: Bureau of Commercial Fisheries; California Department of Fish and Wildlife
- Academic advisor: Carl Leavitt Hubbs

Frances Naomi Clark (1894 – 1987) was an American ichthyologist. She was one of the first woman fishery researchers to receive world-wide recognition.

The daughter of a Nebraska farmer, she was born near St. Edward, Nebraska. She moved to California with her family in 1910 and attended Stanford University, earning an A.B. in zoology in 1918. She was employed by the United States Bureau of Commercial Fisheries from 1918 to 1921, working as lab assistant for Charles Henry Gilbert. She worked for the California Division of Fish and Game from 1921 to 1923. She earned a MS in 1924 and a PhD in 1925 from the University of Michigan. From 1925 to 1926, she taught at San Jose Junior High School. From 1926 to 1941, she worked for the California Department of Fish and Game as an assistant biologist and then researcher. From 1941, she was director of the California State Fisheries Laboratory on Terminal Island, retiring to La Jolla in 1956.

Her research mainly focused on the Pacific sardine. Besides working in California, she also conducted research studies in Peru and New Zealand.

Clark's studies of sardine populations off the California coast during the 1930s led her to believe that, without better yield management in the sardine fishery, depletion of the sardine population was inevitable. Calls for restraint from Clark and other scientists were ignored and the collapse of the fishery and the associated canning industry followed. She later played an important role in establishing California Cooperative Oceanic Fisheries Investigations (CalCOFI) and continued to be involved with that organization after her retirement.

Clark never married. Her sister Laura Hubbs and brother-in-law Carl Leavitt Hubbs were both ichthyologists. Clark died on 10 February 1987 in La Jolla.

== See also ==
- Clark Hubbs, ichthyologist, nephew
- Robert Rush Miller, ichthyologist, nephew-in-law
