= Francis Clerke (lawyer) =

English lawyer

Francis Clerke or Clarke (fl. 1594), was an English lawyer.

Clerke, after a short stay at Oxford, left the university and went to Doctors' Commons, and for about forty years practised civil law in various courts. In consequence of his having acted as senior proctor for the university he received the degree of B.C.L. without examination in 1594, having then practised in London about thirty-five years.

He wrote 'Praxis tam jus dicentibus quam aliis omnibus qui in foro ecclesiastico versantur,' finished in 1596, but not published until after the author's death; an edition was published at Dublin in 1664, 4to (Brit. Mus.), and another by T. Bladen, dean of Ardfert, Ireland, 1666 (Wood), 2nd ed. 1684, 4to (Brit. Mus.); and 'Praxis curiæ Admiralitatis Angliæ,' Dublin, 1666 (Wood); London, 1667, 8vo; edited by F. Hargrave, 1743, 8vo; 5th edition, 1798, 12mo; also in Latin and English, 1722, and again translated with notes referring to American admiralty practice by J. E. Hall in the second part or his 'Practice and Jurisdiction of the Court of Admiralty,' Baltimore, 1809, 8vo.
