= Frank A. Clark =

American cartoonist

Frank A. Clark (1911–1991) was the creator of The Country Parson, a series of one panel newspaper cartoons that appeared in The Des Moines Register and was syndicated by more than 200 newspapers. It ran from 1955 until his death in 1991.

== Biography ==
Clark was born in Elkhart, Iowa Oct. 10, 1911. He enrolled in Drake University in 1929 with the intention of becoming a minister, working part time as a janitor to make ends meet. After struggling with seminary courses, he changed to a degree in math.

The first installment of The Country Parson was published April 4, 1955. It was initially conceived by Minnesota cartoonist Wally Falk. Falk already had a single panel cartoon and was looking to get a second one started. Register and Tribune Syndicate carried Falk's Kickin' Around. Falk approached Clark with the idea and Clark decided to try it. Clark worked with Falk on the panel until Falk's death in 1962. At that time, Dennis Neal replaced Falk. Neal was an advertising artist with the Des Moines Register.

Clark was an editor and executive with the Register and Tribune Syndicate for 35 years and had been its business manager for 10 years at the time of his retirement in 1976. He continued to write The Country Parson after he retired.
