= Archdeacon of Elphin =

The Archdeacon of Elphin was a senior ecclesiastical officer within the Diocese of Elphin until 1854; and then within the Diocese of Kilmore, Elphin and Ardagh

The archdeaconry can trace its history from Maolkeevin O'Seingin, the first known incumbent, who died in 1224 to the last discrete holder William Wolfe Wagner.
