= Choir Schools' Association =

The Choir Schools' Association is a |U.K. organisation that provides support to choir schools and choristers. The association promotes singing, in particular, music for Christian worship in the cathedral tradition. It represents 44 choir schools attached to cathedrals, churches, and college chapels.

The association was founded in 1918, though it represents some schools that are centuries older. Today it provides bursaries and scholarships to 120 children to pursue training as choristers, primarily through the Chorister Fund established in 1985. It also supports schools directly. Katharine, Duchess of Kent, was a patron of the association up until her death.

== Members ==
The following schools, cathedrals, and churches are members of the Choir School Association in 2020:

England

- Blackburn Cathedral
- Bristol Cathedral Choir School
- Chapel Royal, Hampton Court
- Chetham's School of Music, Manchester
- Chorister School, Durham
- Christ Church Cathedral School, Oxford
- City of London School
- Croydon Minster
- Dean Close Preparatory School, Cheltenham
- Frideswide Voices, Oxford
- Hereford Cathedral School
- King's Ely
- King's College School, Cambridge
- King's Rochester Preparatory School, Kent
- King's School, Worcester
- Leicester Cathedral
- Lichfield Cathedral School
- Lincoln Cathedral
- Lincoln Minster School
- London Oratory School
- Magdalen College School, Oxford
- New College School, Oxford
- Norwich School
- Old Palace School, Croydon
- Portsmouth Grammar School
- Queen Elizabeth Grammar School, Wakefield
- Reigate St Mary's Preparatory and Choir School
- Ripon Cathedral
- Runnymede St Edward's School, Liverpool
- St Cedd's School, Essex
- St Edmund's School Canterbury
- St Edward's College, Liverpool
- St George's School, Windsor Castle
- St John's College School, Cambridge
- St Nicholas Cathedral, Newcastle upon Tyne
- St Paul's Cathedral School, London
- St Peter's Collegiate Church, Wolverhampton
- Salisbury Cathedral School
- Sheffield Cathedral
- The Cathedral School, Exeter
- The King's School, Gloucester
- The King's School, Peterborough
- The Minster School, Southwell
- St Peter's School, York
- The Pilgrims' School, Winchester
- The Prebendal School, Chichester
- Truro School
- Wells Cathedral School
- Westminster Abbey Choir School
- Westminster Cathedral Choir School
- Whitgift School, Croydon

Ireland

- St Patrick's Cathedral Choir School, Dublin

New Zealand

- The Cathedral Grammar School, Christchurch, New Zealand

Scotland

- St Mary's Music School, Edinburgh

United States

- Saint Thomas Choir School, New York

Wales

- The Cathedral School, Llandaff
- St John's College, Cardiff
