= John Whitworth (musician) =

- Born: 27 December 1921; Ely, Cambridgeshire, England
- Died: 11 July 2013 (aged 91) Leicester, England
- Occupations: Countertenor, organist, teacher of music

John Anthony Whitworth (27 December 1921 – 11 July 2013) was an English countertenor, organist, and teacher of music. He was a lay vicar at Westminster Abbey and a professor at the Guildhall School of Music.

== Early life ==
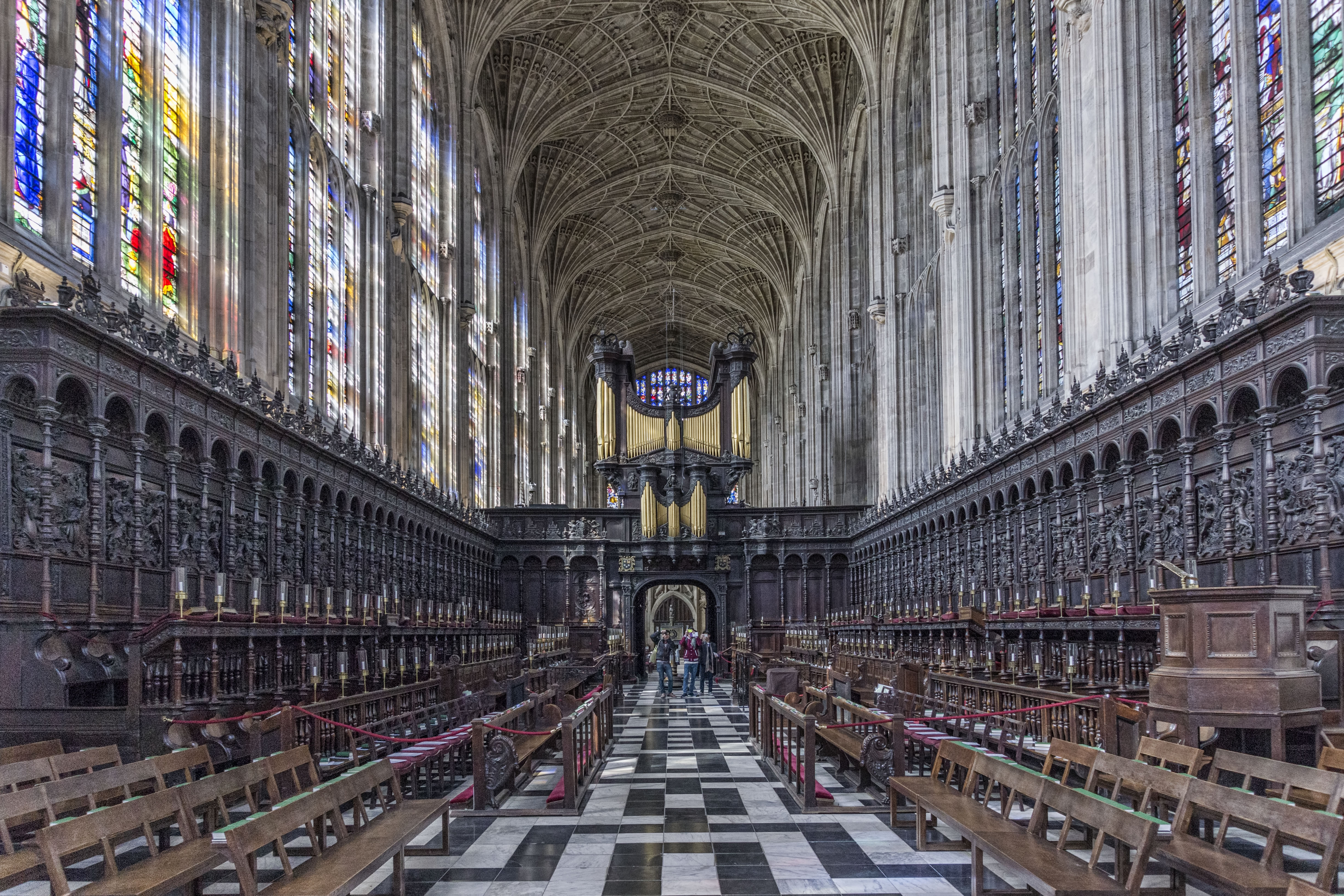
The choir stalls, King's College Chapel

Whitworth was born on 27 December 1921 in Ely, Cambridgeshire, the son of Horace Whitworth, a potato merchant, and his wife Mary Anne, and educated at Kimbolton School. While still at school, Whitworth became organist at the Sutton-in-the-Isle parish church. With the outbreak of the Second World War, he deferred his education and joined the Royal Air Force. Becoming a flight mechanic, in 1941 he was posted to Canada, but returned to Europe and was in Paris for VE Day.

Whitworth was demobilized in 1946 and took up a place at King's College, Cambridge, as a choral scholar of King's College Chapel, under the direction of Boris Ord.

== Career ==
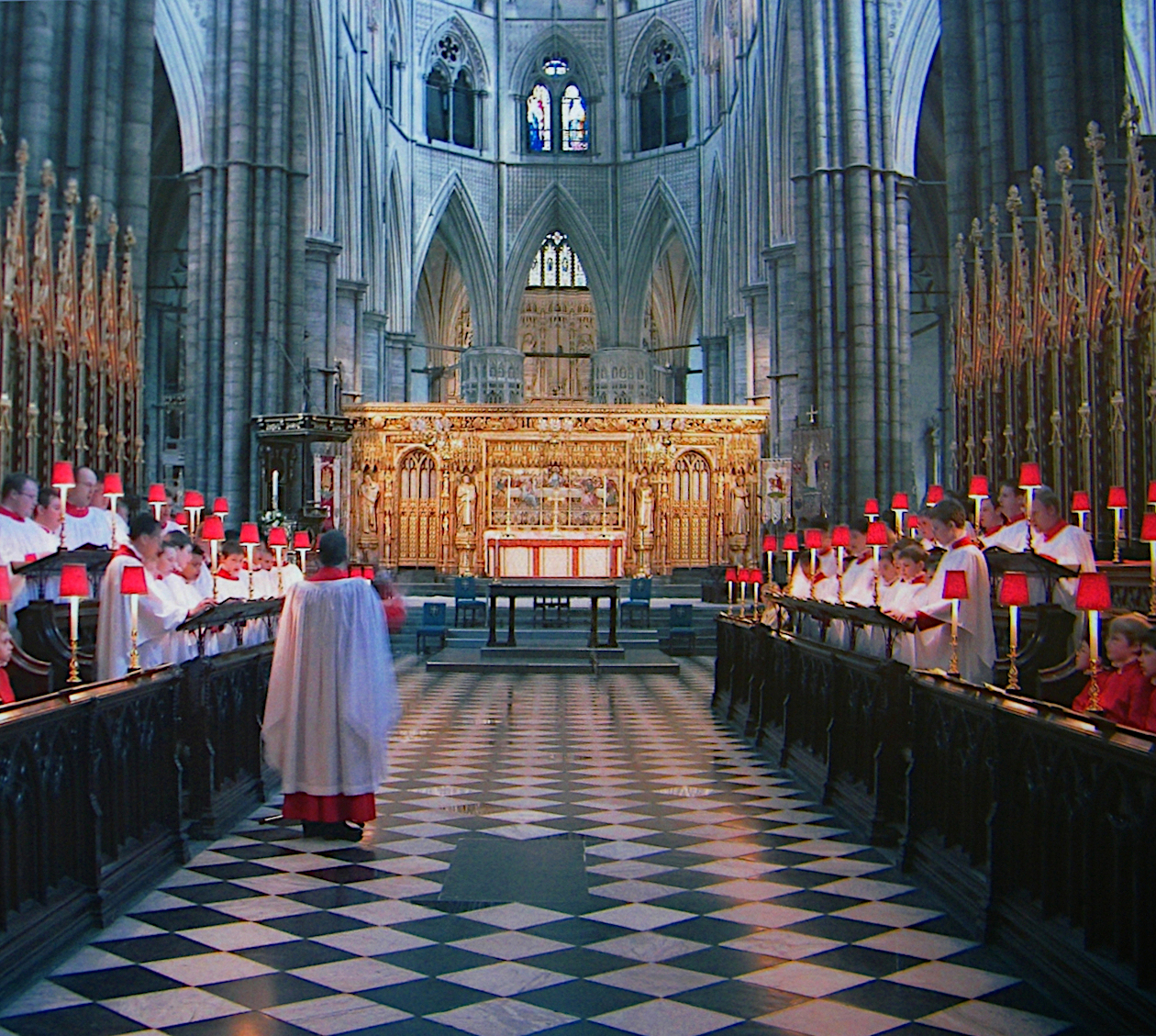
Choir stalls of Westminster Abbey

On graduating from Cambridge in 1949, Whitworth was appointed to the choir of Westminster Abbey as a singing lay vicar and remained there for 22 years. He also worked as a singing master at Reigate St Mary's, a choir school in Surrey, but later switched to teaching maths at the Westminster Abbey Choir School, to reduce the strain on his voice.

Whitworth's first solo engagement as a professional singer was in 1950, in Handel's Messiah at the Methodist Central Hall, Westminster. Not long after that he was singing with the Deller Consort in radio broadcasts. In 1952 he sang songs by William Byrd solo for the BBC.

Soon after his arrival at Westminster Abbey, Whitworth met the organist Michael Howard, founder of the Renaissance Singers, whose aim was to promote a liturgical revival of the great music of the Renaissance, the Reformation, and the Restoration. The two worked closely together, with Whitworth taking on the position of director of the group.

Living in London, Whitworth was in much demand as a singer and also as a choir director for recitals, concerts, recordings, and BBC Radio broadcasts. He also toured with the Golden Age Singers.

While still at Westminster Abbey, Whitworth was organist of Christ Church, Chelsea, in 1964–1965 and of St Paul's, Covent Garden, from 1965 to 1970. In 1965 he was also appointed as a professor at the Guildhall School of Music and Drama. Among the students he taught there was the countertenor Peter Giles.

Whitworth gave up all his London positions in 1971 to become a music adviser to Leicestershire County Council, a post he held until his retirement at age 65 in 1986. In 1988 he began to teach at Uppingham School, where one of his students was the countertenor Robin Blaze. He also took a research interest in early music, transcribing many compositions from primary sources in the British Library and the British Museum, and was the editor of a hymn book.

Whitworth was the second most prominent countertenor in England after Alfred Deller during the countertenor revival of the 1940s and 1950s, and they sang together in duets by John Blow and Henry Purcell. The critic Richard Lawrence considered Whitworth a better singer than Deller, writing in Gramophone in 2005:

My command performer is English, rooted in the Anglican choral tradition – and not Alfred Deller. Deller was a wonderful singer, perhaps a little precocious at times, and cornered the concert and recording market in the 1950s and 60s. But for my money he was outclassed by John Whitworth. He had a voice of great beauty, rich in the lower register, trumpet-toned in the upper, and without the Deller vibrato.

== Private life ==
In 1963 Whitworth married Patricia Fitzgerald, and they had three daughters, Alexandra, Juliet and Victoria. From 1971, the family lived in Leicester. In addition to his musical career, Whitworth was an avid car collector, owning some thirty models, including vintage Rolls-Royce cars. He died in Leicester on 11 July 2013.

== Honours ==
- Honorary degree, Loughborough University, 1998

== Selected publications ==
- John Whitworth, Three Catches for Travellers (Stainer & Bell, 1965, ASIN B0000D541K)
