= Reigate St Mary's School =

Reigate St Mary's Preparatory and Choir School
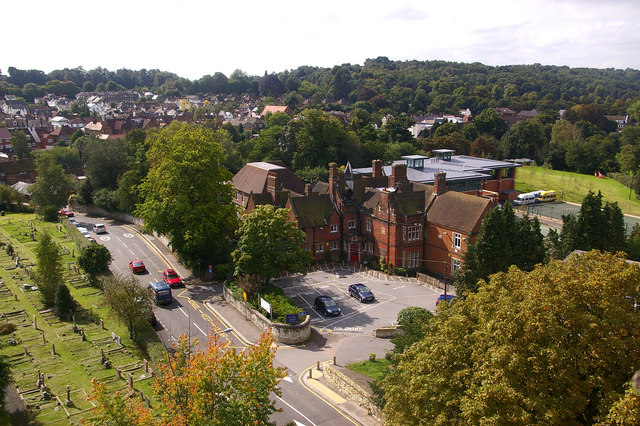
- Main school buildings

Location
- Chart Lane; Reigate, Surrey, RH2 7RN; England; 51.236161°N 0.198374°W

Information
- Type: Private day school
- Established: 1949; 77 years ago
- Founder: Godfrey Searle Choir Trust
- Trust: RGS Foundation
- Headmaster: Marcus Culverwell
- Staff: 73 (2020)
- Gender: Mixed
- Age range: 3–11
- Enrolment: 337 (2016)
- Capacity: 350
- Accreditation: Choir Schools' Association
- Affiliation: Independent Association of Prep Schools
- Website: reigatestmarys.org

Reigate St Mary's Preparatory and Choir School is a mixed private prep and choir school in Reigate, Surrey, England.

The school was established in 1949 to serve as the choir school of St Mary's Church, and still has that function. In 2003 it became affiliated to Reigate Grammar School and serves as its junior school, with some three-quarters of children leaving the school going on to RGS.

== History ==
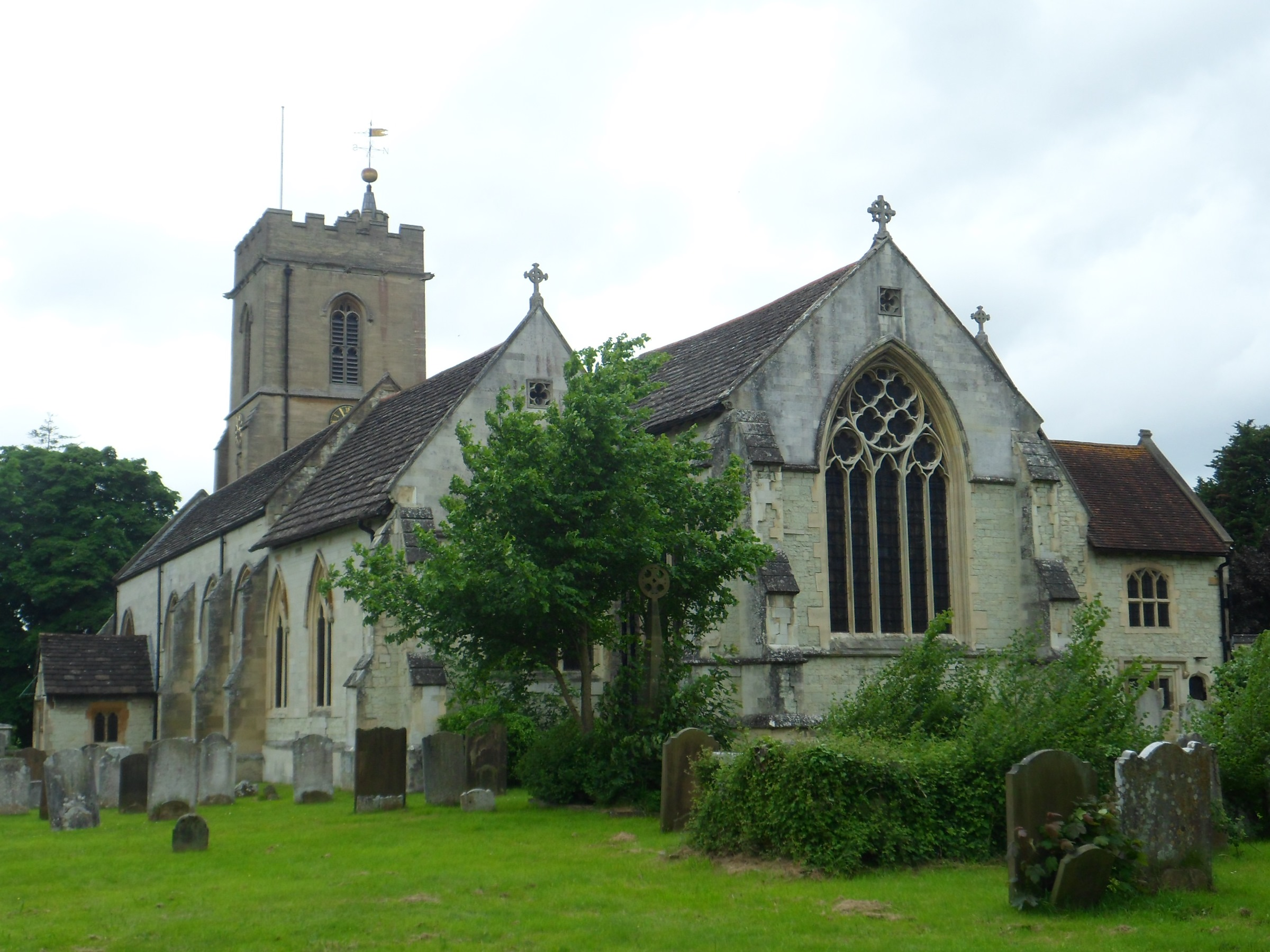
St Mary's Church, Reigate

In 1918, Godfrey Searle, a Reigate stockbroker, established a fund to provide choral scholarships at Reigate Grammar School for the boy choristers of St Mary's Church. This arrangement came to an end as the result of the school becoming a non-fee-paying selective grammar school under the Education Act 1944, for boys who passed the Eleven-plus, with no provision for teaching junior boys.

Reigate St Mary's School was founded in 1949 as a prep school for boys only, with the initial purpose of educating the junior St Mary's choristers and recruiting new ones. At the outset, the Rev. J. P. H. Hobson MA (Oxon) was appointed as headmaster, and John Whitworth, a lay vicar and countertenor at Westminster Abbey, was employed to teach the boys music and singing.

In its early days, boys were admitted to the school at the ages of eight or nine and left when they were about eleven or thirteen. In 1950, the school was recognized as efficient by the Ministry of Education. Hobson, also a magistrate, was a strict disciplinarian with a zero-tolerance policy towards swearing. In 1961, Hobson married, and his wife joined him in a flat at the school. Reigate St Mary's was noted as a successful English choir school in The Music Yearbook, 1973, and in 1992 was recommended for its choral music in the Organists' Review.

A new headmaster appointed in 1983, J. Anthony Hart, came from being a housemaster at Scarborough College.

In 1998, the school was still for boys only, with an age range from five to thirteen, but with an attached Day Nursery for children between three and five. In that year, a sports master at the school, Nick Drewett, killed himself shortly before he was due to appear in court charged with child abuse. Another master had also been charged with him; they were subsequently acquitted. Drewett's death led to Crispin Blunt, member of parliament for Reigate, calling for anonymity for schoolteachers accused but not convicted of sexual misconduct.

By 2004, the school was co-educational. In 2012, the number of children was 290, of whom 190 were boys and 100 girls. By 2016, the total had increased to 337, with 147 girls and 190 boys.

In 2015, nineteen school-leavers won scholarships at Reigate Grammar School, Box Hill School, and Dunottar.

== School campus ==
Reigate St Mary's occupies a fifteen-acre campus of parkland and sports fields on Chart Lane, Reigate, on the outskirts of the historic town centre.

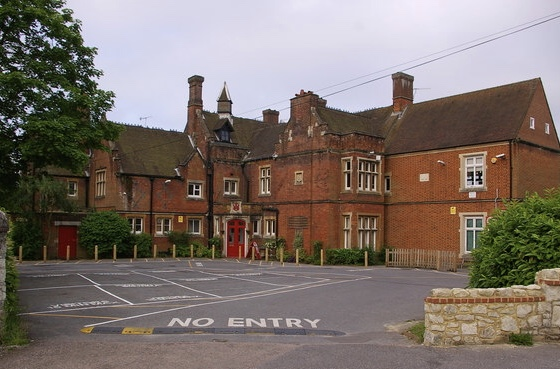
Sunnyside, the oldest building

The three main buildings are Sunnyside, a Victorian house which belonged to Godfrey Searle, founder of the St Mary's Church Choir; Beech House, built about 2007, now the main classroom block, including a large sports hall; and Cedar House, with the kindergarten and the ICT rooms. A smaller science and arts building also contains the Year 6 classrooms. There is a dining hall and a separate building for the Green Shoots Nursery.

A Garden of Remembrance commemorates choristers of St Mary's Church, Reigate, lost in both World Wars.

== Curriculum and character ==
The school provides a broad education, within a tradition of choral singing and Christian values. There are specialist teaching facilities for music, ICT, and art, and an Early Years Foundation Stage centre for children up to the age of five.

In the ICT classrooms, one suite uses Apple Mac computers and another PCs, and children begin to attend ICT lessons there while in the kindergarten. From Year 4, each pupil has an iPad. The foreign languages taught are French, Spanish, and German.

School sports are played during the day, and the school is divided into four houses, called Hobson, Malcolmson, Osmond, and Searle, identified by the colours green, blue, yellow, and red, respectively, which compete at rugby, soccer, field hockey, cricket, netball, athletics, and cross-country running.

Most children at the school come from business and professional families in its locality and reflect the cultural diversity of the population. In conjunction with the Independent Association of Prep Schools, the school has developed a programme called "Education for Social Responsibility". In October 2019, the headmaster commented to The Daily Telegraph "We’ve seen the strength of feeling among the younger generation, as it’s their future we are jeopardising. The need for children to understand what it means to be socially responsible couldn’t be more important."

Most Year groups have two classes, but the school is still growing. In September 2020, it is planning to launch a third Year 3 class.

== Choirs ==
Choristers are recruited up to the age of eleven. The school has three choirs led by a Head of Choral Music and is a member of the Choir Schools' Association. It is one of the few such schools not affiliated to a cathedral or college. For a school to be a full member of the CSA, it must provide a choir that sings a minimum of four services a week in a particular cathedral, church, or chapel.

In 2000, John Tobin was appointed as Master of Choristers and remained in post until 2014. In his time, the school choir made appearances at Westminster Cathedral, Chichester Cathedral, the Queen's Chapel of the Savoy, the Chapel Royal of St James's Palace, St Paul's Cathedral, and Arundel Cathedral. It also sang with Keith Urban, worked on feature film soundtracks, including Milk (2008), Astro Boy (2009), and Angels & Demons (2009), and was featured on the soundtrack of Tim Burton’s Alice in Wonderland (2010). The school choristers also sang two tracks on Michael W. Smith's album It's a Wonderful Christmas (2007) and in the recording of Andrew Lloyd Webber's musical Love Never Dies (2010).

In 2016, pupil standards in choral music at Reigate St Mary's were found on inspection to be "exceptional". The school choir was regularly performing in local and national events, including singing at the 2015 Rugby World Cup.

The singer Mike Christie began his musical career by winning a choral scholarship to the school.

The school's archives contain letters written to Godfrey Searle, its founder, by former St Mary's choir boys serving overseas in the First World War.

== School day ==
The formal school day runs from 8:25 am to 3:30 pm, but children can arrive earlier for breakfast at 7:30 am, and there is an "Extended Day" programme until 6 pm, including a hot meal in the Dining Room at 5 pm. "Wraparound" all-day childcare is available all round the year, apart from four weeks in the summer holiday period.

== Extracurricular activities ==
Many children play a musical instrument. In 2016, pupils were playing chess for the county team.

The school has an indoor heated swimming pool, and additional sports include archery, fencing, and benchball.

In 2017, the school organised a four-kilometre Hope Walk around Reigate to raise awareness of suicides among young people. In the same year, a team from the school called Razor Sharp Minds won the regional final of the FIRST LEGO League Challenge. In 2018, Year 5 children carried out a project which made the school's nature-reserve area more bee and butterfly friendly, upgrading it to a standard for children from other schools to visit. In October, this won the London area competition of the national Make a Difference Challenge.

== Inspection ==
An Independent Schools Inspectorate report published in 2016 reported that children at the school had "highly developed numeracy skills" and that problem-solving was commonplace, especially in maths. Pupils showed high levels of independent learning and had good literacy skills, but writing ability was less developed, with limited opportunities for extended written work. Children had "strong thinking skills", asked probing questions, had good scientific understanding and excellent ability with ICT, were creative and imaginative in artwork, and achieved excellent results in external exams. They also had good physical development and sporting skills, thanks to high-quality sports coaching. School teams had done well in netball, rugby, and the biathlon, with five children winning places in county and national teams in karate and swimming, while others had been selected for training at major football academies.

== Fees ==
In 2025, school fees were between £16,650 and £21,420 a year, according to age. Choral scholarships are provided by the Godfrey Searle Choir Trust, a charitable body formerly known as the Reigate St Mary's Choir.

== Notable former pupils ==
- Sir Christopher Hampton (born 1946), author
- Tom Chilton (born 1985), racing driver
- Max Chilton (Born 1990), Formula 1 Racing driver
- Mike Christie (born 1981), singer

== Notable staff ==
- John Whitworth, music and singing master

== List of headmasters ==
- 1949–1983: Rev. J. P. H. Hobson MA (Keble College, Oxford), died 1993
- 1983–1998: J. Anthony Hart
- 1998–2003: David Tidmarsh
- 2003–2006: Alex J. Gear
- 2006 to date: Marcus Culverwell
