= List of choir schools =

This article contains a list of choir schools sorted alphabetically by country.

== Australia ==
- St Andrew's Cathedral School, Sydney
- St Mary's Cathedral College, Sydney
- Xavier High School, Albury, NSW
- St John's Cathedral Choir School, Brisbane
- [(St Peters Lutheran College Chorale (Brisbane),

== Austria ==
- Vienna Boys' Choir, Vienna

== Canada ==
- Royal St. George's College, Toronto
- St. Michael's Choir School, Toronto

== Czech Republic ==
- Boni Pueri, the Czech Boys Choir, Hradec Králové

== Denmark ==
- Copenhagen Boys Choir

== France ==
- Maîtrise de Radio France
- Maîtrise Notre Dame de Paris

== Germany ==
- Kreuzschule, Dresden
- Thomasschule zu Leipzig, Leipzig
- Gymnasium der Regensburger Domspatzen, Regensburg

== Latvia ==
- Riga Cathedral Choir School

== New Zealand ==
- The Cathedral Grammar School
- Sacred Heart Cathedral School, Thorndon

== South Africa ==
- Drakensberg Boys' Choir School

== United Kingdom ==
- Bristol Cathedral Choir School
- The Cathedral School, Llandaff, Cardiff (Church in Wales)
- Christ Church Cathedral School, Oxford
- Exeter Cathedral School
- Hereford Cathedral School
- King's College School, Cambridge
- King's Ely
- The King's School, Gloucester
- The King's (The Cathedral) School, Peterborough
- The King's School, Rochester, Rochester
- The King's School, Worcester
- Lichfield Cathedral School
- Lincoln Minster School
- The London Oratory School
- Magdalen College School, Oxford
- The Minster School, Southwell
- New College School, Oxford
- Norwich School (previously King Edward VI's Grammar School)
- The Pilgrims' School, Winchester
- Old Palace School, Croydon
- Truro School, Cornwall
- Polwhele House School, Cornwall
- Portsmouth Grammar School, Portsmouth
- The Prebendal School, Chichester
- St Edmund's School, Canterbury
- St. Edward's College, Liverpool Metropolitan Cathedral
- St George's School, Windsor Castle
- St James' School, Grimsby
- St John's College School, Cambridge
- St John's College, Cardiff (RC)
- Reigate St Mary's School, Surrey
- St Mary's Music School, Edinburgh
- St Paul's Cathedral School, London
- St Peter's School, York
- Salisbury Cathedral School, Wiltshire
- Wells Cathedral School
- Westminster Abbey Choir School (CofE)
- Westminster Cathedral Choir School (RC)
- Whitgift School, Croydon
- Chorister School, Durham

== United States ==
- Newark Boys Chorus school (closed in 2023)
- Pacific Boychoir Academy(closed in 2025)
- Saint Thomas Choir School
- St. Albans School (Washington, D.C.)
- St. Paul's Choir School
- The American Boychoir School (closed in 2017)
- Charlotte Choir School (Formerly The Choir School at St. Peter's)
- The Madeleine Choir School
- Westminster Choir College

== See also ==
- Cathedral school
