= Cathedral school =

Centers of advanced education of the Early Middle Ages

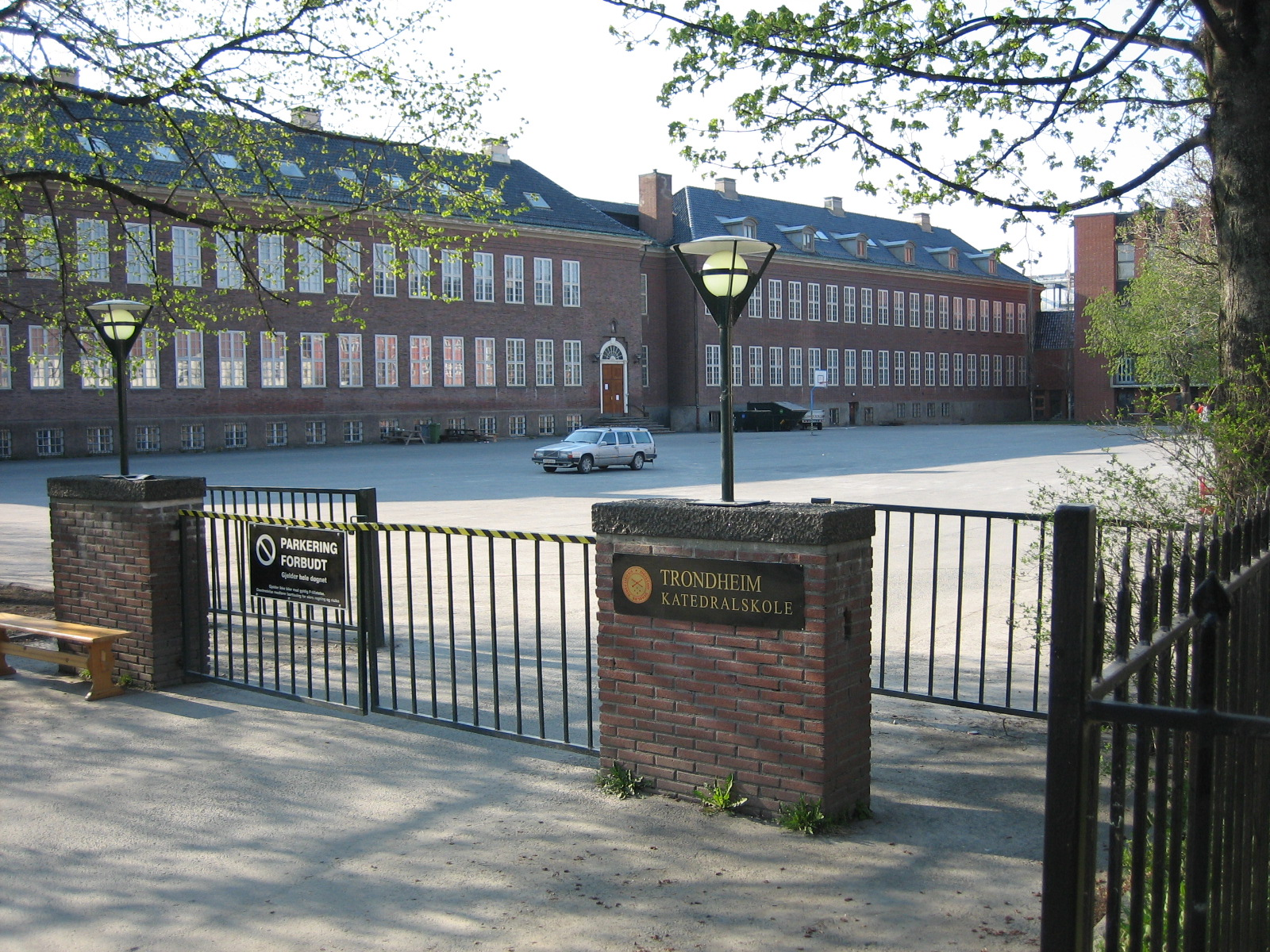
The cathedral school of Trondheim, founded in 1152, is the oldest school in Norway. Today, the Katedralskole serves as secondary school.

Cathedral schools began in the Early Middle Ages as centers of advanced education, some of them ultimately evolving into medieval universities. Throughout the Middle Ages and beyond, they were complemented by the monastic schools. Some of these early cathedral schools, and more recent foundations, continued into modern times.

== Early schools ==
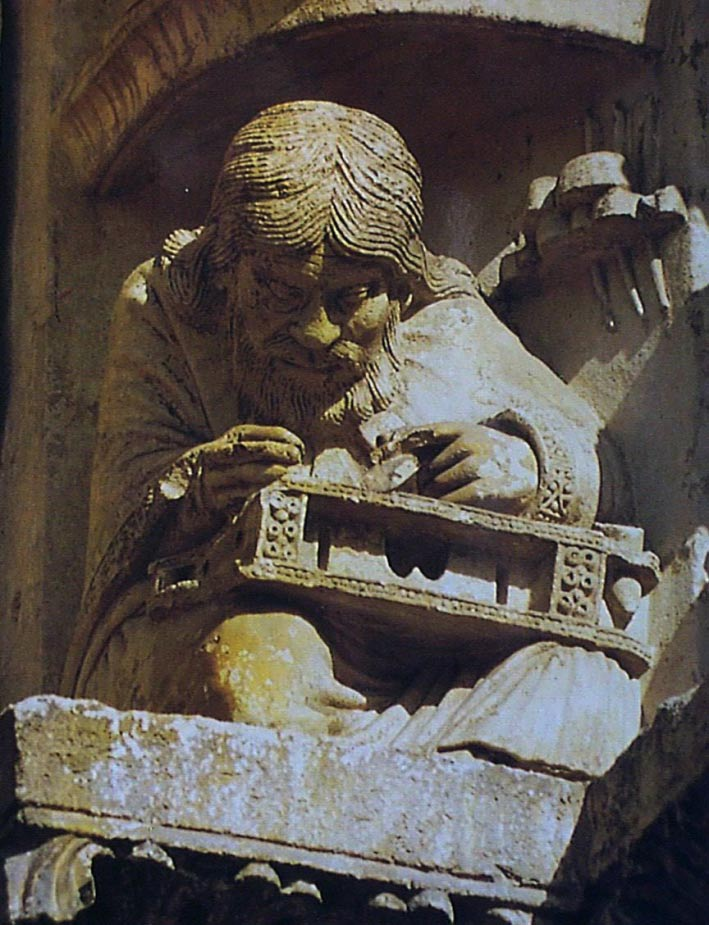
Philosopher on one of the archivolts over the right door of the west portal at Chartres Cathedral

In the later Roman Empire, as Roman municipal education declined, bishops began to establish schools associated with their cathedrals to provide the church with an educated clergy. The earliest evidence of a school established in this manner is in Visigothic Spain at the Second Council of Toledo in 527. These early schools, with a focus on an apprenticeship in religious learning under a scholarly bishop, have been identified in other parts of Spain and about twenty towns in Gaul (France) during the sixth and seventh centuries.

During and after the mission of St Augustine to England, cathedral schools were established as the new dioceses were themselves created (Canterbury 597, Rochester 604, York 627 for example). This group of schools forms the oldest schools continuously operating. A significant function of cathedral schools was to provide boy trebles for the choirs, evolving into choir schools, some of which still function as such.

Charlemagne, king of the Franks and later Emperor, recognizing the importance of education to the clergy and, to a lesser extent, to the nobility, set out to restore this declining tradition by issuing several decrees requiring that education be provided at monasteries and cathedrals. In 789, Charlemagne's Admonitio Generalis required that schools be established in every monastery and bishopric, in which "children can learn to read; that psalms, notation, chant, computation, and grammar be taught." Subsequent documents, such as the letter De litteris colendis, required that bishops select as teachers men who had "the will and the ability to learn and a desire to instruct others" and a decree of the Council of Frankfurt (794) recommended that bishops undertake the instruction of their clergy.

Subsequently, cathedral schools arose in major cities such as Chartres, Orleans, Paris, Laon, Reims or Rouen in France and Utrecht, Liege, Cologne, Metz, Speyer, Würzburg, Bamberg, Magdeburg, Hildesheim or Freising in Germany. Following in the earlier tradition, these cathedral schools primarily taught future clergy and provided literate administrators for the increasingly elaborate courts of the Renaissance of the 12th century. Speyer was renowned for supplying the Holy Roman Empire with diplomats. The court of Henry I of England, himself an early example of a literate king, was closely tied to the cathedral school of Laon.

=== Characteristics and development ===
Cathedral schools were mostly oriented around the academic welfare of the nobility's children. Because it was intended to train them for careers in the church, girls were excluded from the schools. Later on, many lay students who were not necessarily interested in seeking a career in the church wanted to enroll. The demand arose for schools to teach government, state, and other Church affairs. The schools, (some notable ones dating back to the eighth and ninth centuries) accepted fewer than 100 students. Pupils had to demonstrate substantial intelligence and be able to handle a demanding academic course load. Considering that books were also expensive, students were in the practice of memorizing their teachers' lectures. Cathedral schools at this time were primarily run by a group of ministers and divided into two parts: Schola minor, which was intended for younger students, would later become elementary schools. Then there was the schola major, which taught older students. These would later become secondary schools.

The subjects taught at cathedral schools ranged from literature to mathematics. These topics were called the seven liberal arts: grammar, astronomy, rhetoric (or speech), logic, arithmetic, geometry and music. In grammar classes, students were trained to read, write and speak Latin which was the universal language in Europe at the time. Astronomy was necessary for calculating dates and times. Rhetoric was a major component of a vocal education. Logic consisted of the criteria for sound or fallacious arguments, particularly in a theological context, and arithmetic served as the basis for quantitative reasoning. Students read stories and poems in Latin by authors such as Cicero and Virgil. Much as in the present day, cathedral schools were split into elementary and higher schools with different curricula. The elementary school curriculum was composed of reading, writing and psalmody, while the high school curriculum was trivium (grammar, rhetoric and logic), the rest of the liberal arts, as well as scripture study and pastoral theology.

== Cathedral schools today ==
While cathedral schools are no longer a significant site of higher education, many Roman Catholic, Anglican, and Lutheran cathedrals operate as primary or secondary schools. Most of those listed below are modern foundations, but a few traces their history to medieval schools.

=== Australia ===
- Bathurst – Cathedral Primary School
- Bunbury – Bunbury Cathedral Grammar School
- Perth – St George's Anglican Grammar School
- Rockhampton – The Cathedral College
- Sydney – St Andrew's Cathedral School
- Sydney – St Mary's Cathedral College
- Townsville – The Cathedral School of St Anne and St James
- Wangaratta – Cathedral College

=== Canada ===
- Hamilton – Christ the King
- Toronto – St. Michael's Choir School

=== Denmark ===
- Ribe – Ribe Katedralskole
- Aarhus – Aarhus Katedralskole
- Aalborg – Aalborg Katedralskole
- Viborg – Viborg Katedralskole
- Odense – Odense Katedralskole
- Roskilde – Roskilde Katedralskole
- Haderslev – Haderslev Katedralskole

=== Finland ===
- Turku – Katedralskolan i Åbo

=== France ===
- Paris – École cathédrale de Paris

=== Guatemala ===
- Colegio San José de los Infantes (founded in 1781)

=== India ===
- Bangalore - Cathedral High School, Bangalore
- Lucknow - Cathedral Senior Secondary School, Hazratganj, Lucknow
- Mumbai - Cathedral and John Connon School, Fort, Mumbai

=== The Netherlands ===
- Koorschool St Bavo, Haarlem
- Kathedrale Koorschool Utrecht

=== Norway ===
- Bergen katedralskole
- Hamar katedralskole
- Kristiansand katedralskole
- Oslo katedralskole
- Stavanger katedralskole
- Trondheim katedralskole

=== Pakistan ===
- Punjab, Pakistan – Lahore Cathedral School No. 1, Mall Road, Lahore
- Punjab, Pakistan - Cathedral High School No. 3, Lahore Cantt
- Punjab, Pakistan - Saint Andrew's High School, Empress Road, Railway Station Lahore

=== South Africa ===
- Cape Town – St. George's Grammar School
- Kimberley – St Cyprian's Grammar School

=== Sweden ===
- Linköping – Katedralskolan
- Lund – Katedralskolan
- Skara – Katedralskolan
- Uppsala – Katedralskolan
- Växjö – Katedralskolan

=== United Kingdom ===
==== England ====
- The seven King's Schools established, or re-endowed and renamed, by King Henry VIII in 1541, are located in Canterbury, Chester, Ely, Gloucester, Peterborough, Rochester and Worcester
- London – St Paul's Cathedral School (Anglican), Westminster Abbey Choir School (Anglican), Westminster Cathedral Choir School (Roman Catholic)
- Bristol – Bristol Cathedral Choir School (a former cathedral school, it is now an academy)
- Chelmsford
- Chichester – The Prebendal School
- Durham – Chorister School
- Exeter – Exeter Cathedral School
- Hereford – Hereford Cathedral School
- Lichfield – Lichfield Cathedral School
- Lincoln, England - Lincoln Minster School
- Oxford – Christ Church Cathedral School
- Salisbury – Salisbury Cathedral School
- Southwell – The Minster School, Southwell
- Wells – Wells Cathedral School
- Winchester – The Pilgrims' School
- York – St Peter's School, York

==== Wales ====
- The Cathedral School, Llandaff
- St John's College, Cardiff (the United Kingdom's only Roman Catholic cathedral school which teaches up to Sixth Form)

=== United States ===
Among others:

- Arlington, Virginia – St. Thomas More Cathedral School
- Boston, Massachusetts – Cathedral High School
- Charlotte Amalie, Saint Thomas, U.S. Virgin Islands – All Saints Cathedral School
- El Paso, Texas - Cathedral High School
- Kalamazoo, Michigan – St. Augustine Cathedral School
- New York, New York – The Cathedral School, on the Upper East Side
- New York, New York – The Cathedral School of St. John the Divine
- Salt Lake City, Utah – St. Vincent DePaul Parish School
- Raleigh, North Carolina – Sacred Heart Cathedral School
- Washington D.C. – National Cathedral School (girls) / St. Albans School (Washington, D.C.) (boys) / Beauvoir School (elementary)
- Natchez, Mississippi - Cathedral Greenwave

== See also ==
- List of choir schools
- Monastic school
- Carolingian Schools
- School of Chartres
- School of Reims

== Sources ==
- NN (1999), "Domschulen", Lexikon des Mittelalters, vol. 3, Stuttgart: J.B. Metzler, p. columns 1226–1229
- Kottje, R. (1999), "Klosterschulen", Lexikon des Mittelalters, vol. 5, Stuttgart: J.B. Metzler, p. columns 1226–1228
- Riché, Pierre (1978), Education and Culture in the Barbarian West: From the Sixth through the Eighth Century, Columbia: University of South Carolina Press, ISBN 0-87249-376-8
- Riché, Pierre (1988), Daily life in the world of Charlemagne, [Philadelphia]: University of Pennsylvania Press, ISBN 0-8122-1096-4
