= Joseph McCormick (cricketer) =

English cricketer (1834–1914)

Joseph McCormick (29 October 1834 at Liverpool – 9 April 1914 at Westminster) was an English amateur cricketer who played from 1854 to 1866.

Joseph McCormick was educated at Bingley Grammar School and St John's College, Cambridge. A right-handed batsman and right arm slow roundarm bowler who was mainly associated with Cambridge University and Marylebone Cricket Club (MCC), he made 19 known appearances. He claimed, while playing on Parker's Piece, to have hit a fast bowler to leg and run nine runs for it. In 1856, the year he captained Cambridge University at cricket, he was also a rowing blue. He played for the Gentlemen in the Gentlemen v Players series.

After Cambridge, he studied at Trinity College, Dublin, Ireland, gaining a BD (Bachelor of Divinity) and a DD (Doctor of Divinity). He was Ordained Deacon of London in 1858 and Priest in 1859

He was made Rector of St James, Piccadilly, London (1900–1914) where an outside pulpit was erected by Friends in 1904; Canon of York Cathedral from 1884 to 1901, and Hon. Chaplain to Queen Victoria, King Edward VII and King George V.

He published a collection of sermons entitled "What is Sin?" and a book: “Why I Am Not a Roman Catholic”. He died at St James Rectory on 9 April 1914

McCormick married Francis Harriet Haines on 20 April 1871 in Dublin, Ireland, the daughter of Lieut-Col. Gregory Haines & Jane Elizabeth Mona Gough, dau of Ist Viscount Gough

Both of their sons, Pat and [[Gough McCormick|Gough]], were clergymen, Gough became Dean of Manchester and Pat also achieved notoriety as a sportsman.

There is a memorial to Joseph McCormick in St James's Church, Piccadilly.
