= Bishop's Palace, Lichfield =

Bishop's Palace
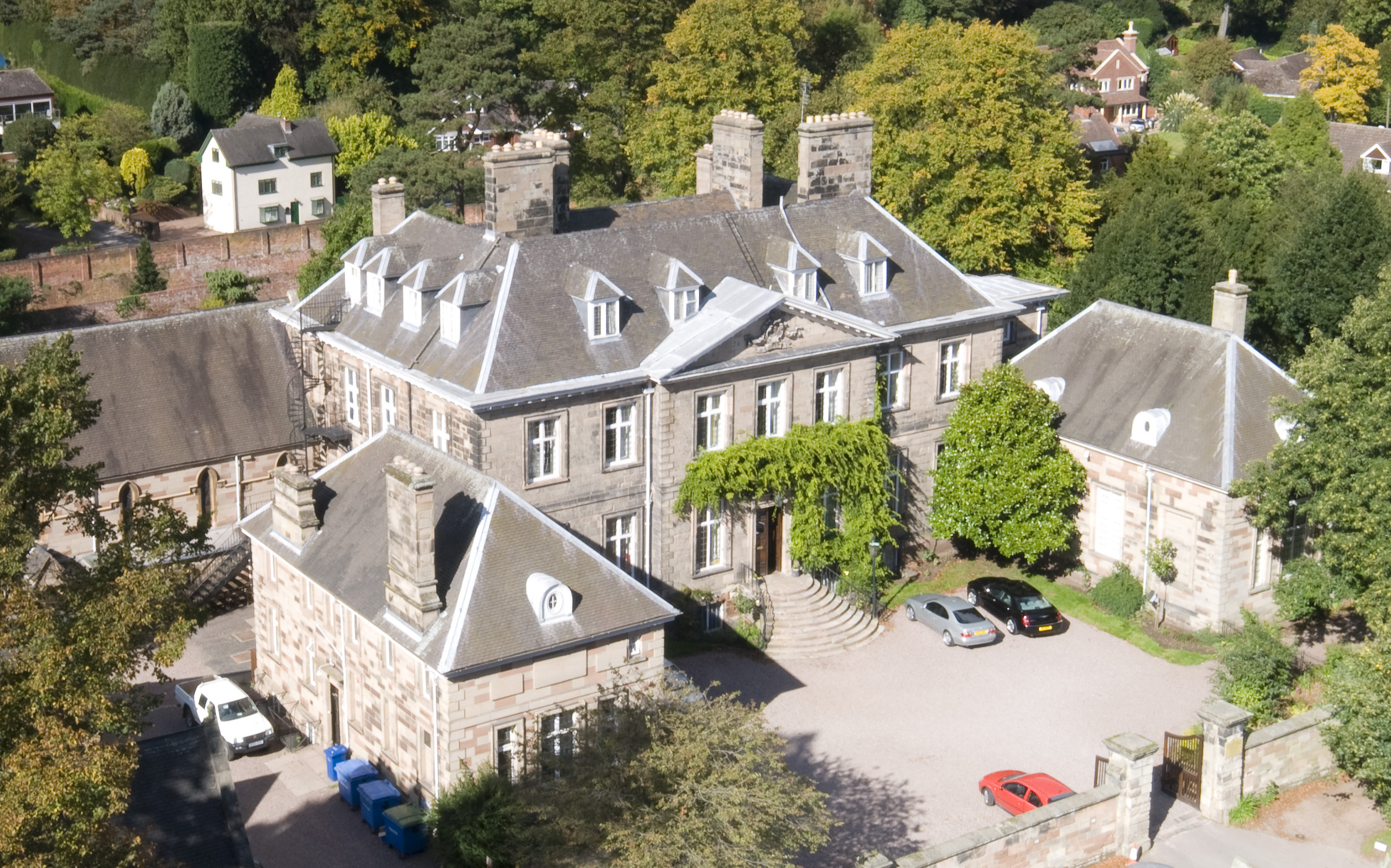
- Interactive map of the Bishop's Palace area
- Alternative names: St Chad's Cathedral School & Chapel

General information
- Type: House
- Architectural style: Queen Anne
- Location: Lichfield, Staffordshire, England
- Coordinates: 52°41′10.69″N 1°49′49.35″W
- Current tenants: Lichfield Cathedral School
- Completed: 1687
- Owner: The Dean and Chapter

Design and construction
- Architect: Edward Pierce

Listed Building – Grade I
- Official name: St Chad's Cathedral School and Chapel
- Designated: 5 February 1952
- Reference no.: 1218871

The Bishop's Palace is a 17th-century building situated in the north-east corner of the Cathedral Close in Lichfield, Staffordshire in England.

The current building replaced a medieval Bishop's Palace built in the 14th century for Bishop Langton. The first palace was destroyed during the English Civil War and rebuilt in 1687 as the current building. The palace was residence to the Bishop of Lichfield from the late 1860s until 1954, it is now used by Lichfield Cathedral School. The palace is a Grade I listed building. To the north and east of the house are the remains of the ditch that surrounded the Close, remains of the north-east tower are present in the rear garden of the palace and is a scheduled monument.

== Architecture ==
Construction of the building began in 1686 and was completed in 1687. The architect was Edward Pierce who had previously worked as one of Christopher Wren's masons. The building was built in the Queen Anne style and comprises two storeys with a seven-window range, low-pitched hipped roof with dormer windows. The front of the house has a symmetrical layout and is topped with a classical pediment over the doorway. As built the palace comprised on the ground floor, a central hall and parlour with a drawing room on the east and a chapel on the west. A bakehouse, brewhouse, and pigsty were built in the north-west corner of the grounds, the rest of which was laid out as gardens and a cherry orchard. In 1868-69 two wings were added to either side of the house and a chapel to the north-west angle. The chapel is built in a gothic style with lancet windows. The original and subsequent buildings are faced in grey ashlar stone.

== History ==
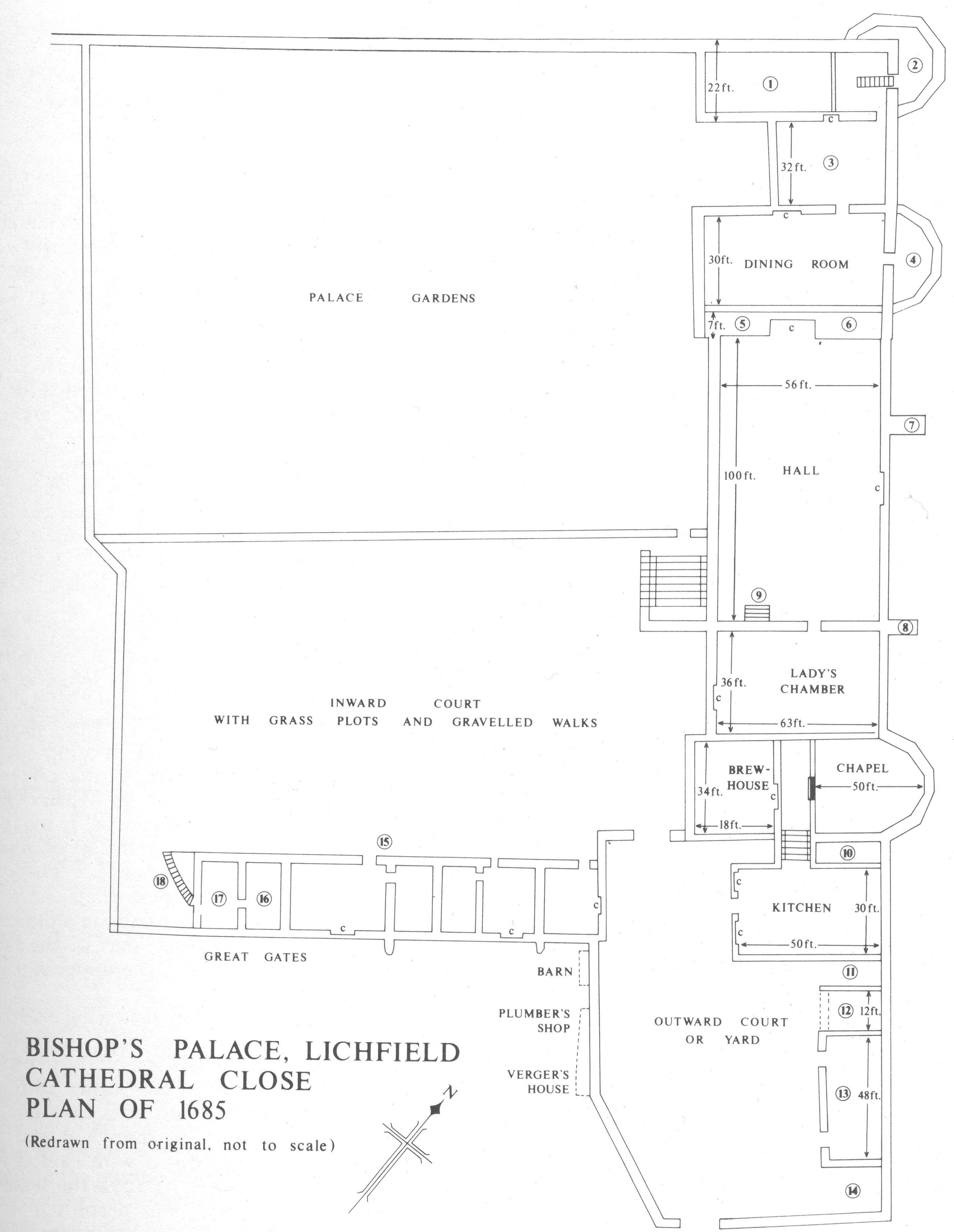
Plan of the medieval Palace

The first building at this location was built for Bishop Langton in 1304–14. This building stretched along the east wall of the Close and was enclosed by its own wall. Walter the carpenter and Hugh de la Dale, a mason were responsible for a palace whose great hall was the fifth or sixth largest in England at the time at 100 ft x 56 ft. The hall was probably aisled, with columns supporting an elaborately carved wooden roof admired in 1634 for its gilt carvings. Paintings of the coronation, marriages, wars and funeral of Edward I decorated the walls and were still visible in the 1590s. The bishop's private quarters lay north of the hall. To the south what was called the Lady's Chamber in 1685 was possibly a reception room. A chapel was built south of the hall, whose east end was a tower protruding from the Close wall. The chapel may have had two storeys: a lower one with access from the passage for the use of servants, and an upper one with access from the Lady's Chamber for the bishop's use. At the south end of the courtyard was a gateway which faced the main, south east entrance of the Close. The palace grounds were entered through a gateway in the south west corner of an inner courtyard.

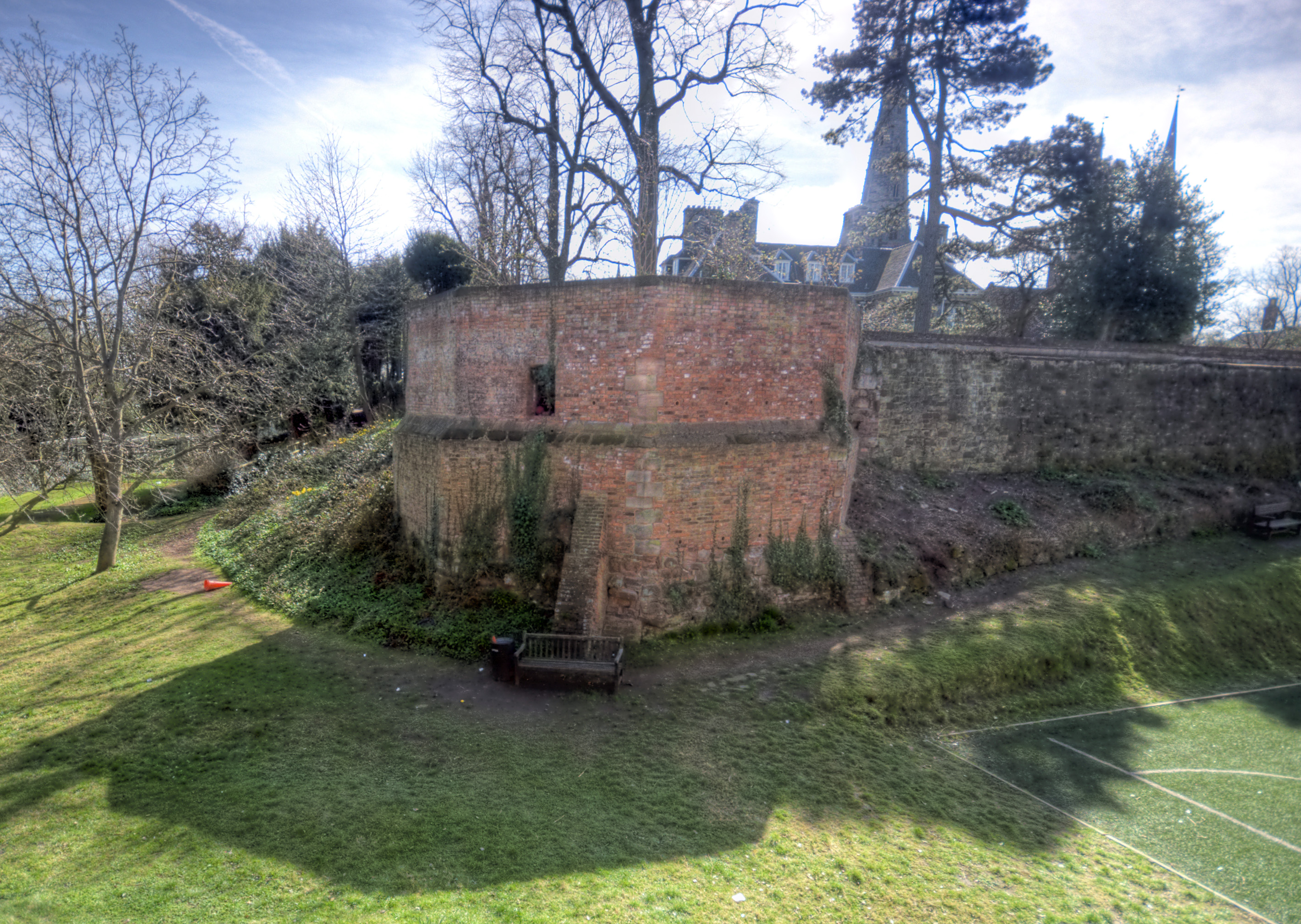
Remains of the 14th-century tower

The original palace was severely damaged during the three sieges of the Cathedral Close in the Civil War from 1643 to 1646. The building was effectively a shell, all the timber work of the hall and of the chambers at its north end was destroyed and only the stone vault remained. After the war Bishop Hacket used stone from the building to renovate a house on the south side of the Close as his residence. The only fragment of the medieval palace which survives is the base of a column found in the early 20th century and set up in the garden.

In 1684 an order to rebuild the palace was put forward to Archbishop Sancroft who delegated the task to Dean Addison. The site was cleared and construction took 18 months, completed in 1687. When built the Bishops did not want to live there and the palace was let to tenants, one of which was Anna Seward, another was Helena Beatson. The palace once again became the Bishops residence when Bishop Selwyn took occupancy in the late 1860s. Selwyn added a chapel to the north-west corner in 1868 and two wings either side of the palace in 1869. The palace remained the bishop's residence until 1953, when Bishop Reeve moved into Bishop's House on the south side of the Close, and the palace was vested in the dean and chapter. Since 1954 the palace has been occupied by Lichfield Cathedral School as one of their teaching buildings.

== See also ==
- Grade I listed buildings in Staffordshire
- Listed buildings in Lichfield
