= Exeter Cathedral School =

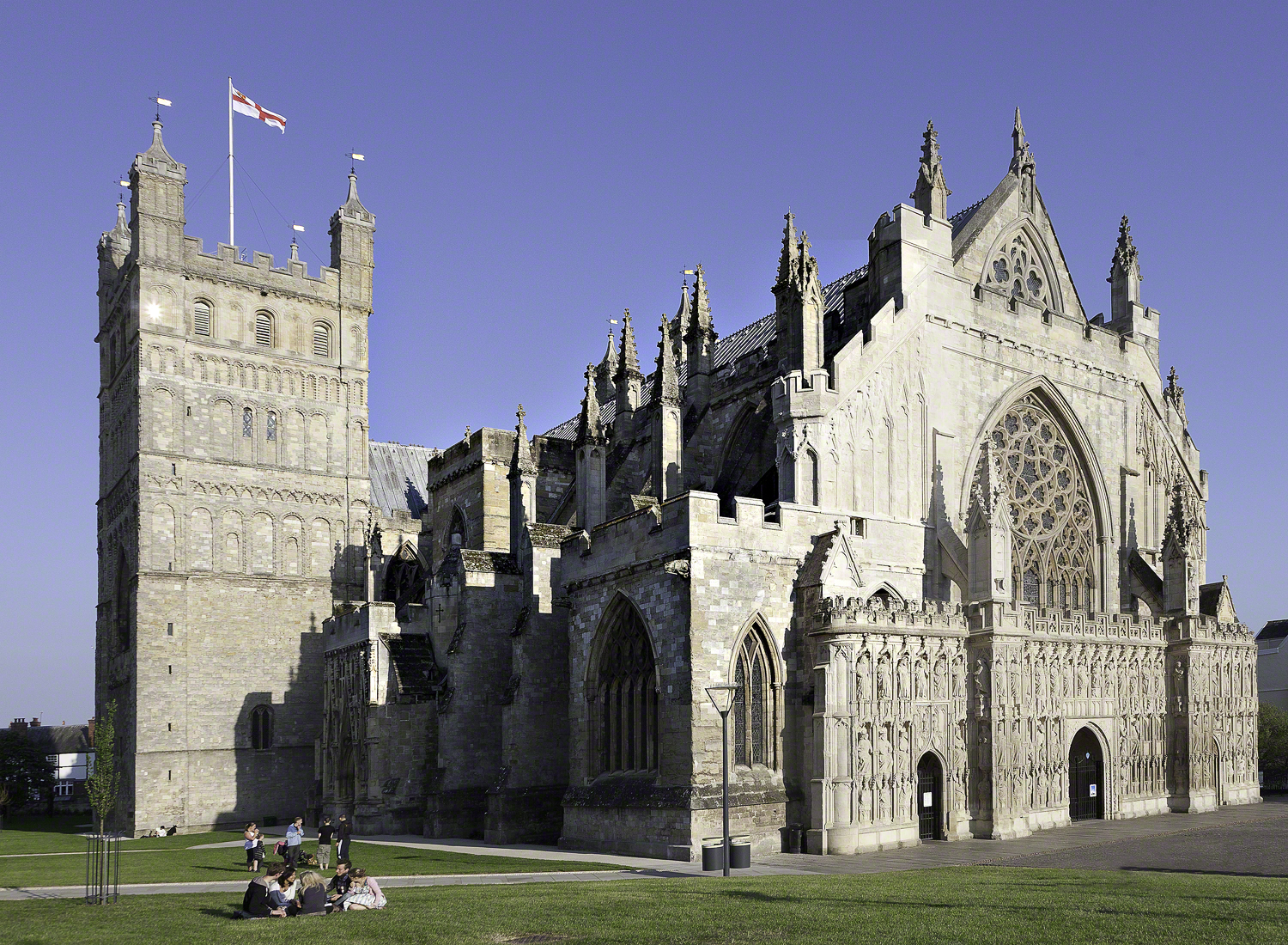
- The cathedral

Location
- The Chantry, Palace Gate; Exeter, Devon, EX1 1HX; England; 50°43′18″N 3°31′49″W

Information
- Other name: ECS
- Type: Private school
- Religious affiliation: Church of England
- Established: 12th century
- Local authority: Devon County Council
- Department for Education URN: 113561 Tables
- Headmaster: James Featherstone
- Gender: Mixed
- Age range: 3–13
- Enrolment: 246 (2020)
- Capacity: 300
- Accreditation: Choir Schools' Association
- Affiliation: Independent Association of Prep Schools
- Website: www.exetercathedralschool.co.uk

Exeter Cathedral School (ECS) was a 3–13 mixed, Church of England, private day and boarding choir and preparatory school in Exeter, Devon, England. It was closely associated with Exeter Cathedral since it was first recorded as existing in the 12th century. The prep school closed in September 2026.

== History ==
The exact date of the founding of the cathedral school is not known, but it educated choristers since 1179. In the 12th century, Exeter was regarded as an important centre of learning, and canon law was also taught at the cathedral.

For centuries, the school was provided by the Dean and Chapter to educate and house about twenty-six boy choristers who sang the cathedral's daily services, including Sung Eucharist and Choral Evensong.

Musical training was given to the choristers by the cathedral's organist and the master of choristers. Although these offices could be held by the same person, from the 17th century on they were usually carried out by two different men. In 1609, Edward Gibbons, a brother of Orlando Gibbons, was hired to teach the choristers instrumental music. In 1662, William Wake was being paid £20 a year to teach the choristers and secondaries composing, singing, and the playing of the viol and the violin, and at the request of Charles II was given a leave of absence to carry out the same duties for the Chapel Royal.

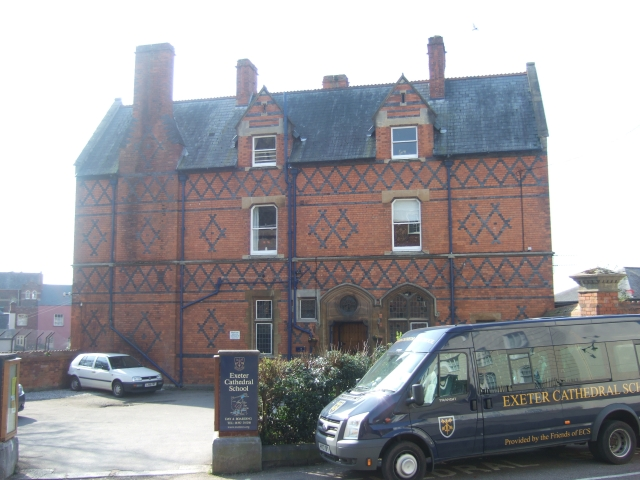
The school entrance

The school's main building, known as the Chantry, was built in 1870.

In the 1960s, the Dean and Chapter began to enlarge the school, offering places to boys other than the cathedral choristers. In 1994, a girls' choir was established in the cathedral, and the school became co-educational. By 2008, the families of the choristers were having to pay for their education, but there were eighteen choral scholarships, worth up to one quarter of the school fees.

In 2014, the school became independent of the Dean and Chapter, when it was established as an institution with its own governance and separate finances.

In 2017, two thirds of school-leavers were offered scholarships, exhibitions, or other awards by senior schools. The school was assessed by the Independent Schools Inspectorate in May 2019 and judged to be 'excellent' in all areas. By 2020, the school was educating about 275 children, offering a broad education rooted in Christian values. It was a member of the Choir Schools' Association.

=== Planned closure ===
In January 2026, Exeter Cathedral School announced that, owing to ongoing financial pressures, it would close the Preparatory School (Years 3–8), including the Cathedral choristers, from September 2026. Under an agreed arrangement, the Nursery and Pre-Prep provision (up to Year 2) is expected to continue under the management of the Inspired Learning Group, in partnership with Hall House School and Shebbear College. A new partnership with Exeter School was also confirmed to enable choristers to continue their education together in a co-educational setting. The school remained open in its current form until the end of the summer term in July 2026.

== Notable former pupils ==
- Matthew Locke, composer
- George Baker, organist
- Joseph Kemp, organist
- William Spark, musician and composer
- Samuel Knight, architect
- Albert Moulton Foweraker, painter
- Geoffrey Mitchell, conductor
- Tony Hymas, musician and composer
- Piers Dudgeon, biographer
- Harry Williamson, musician
- Andrew Nethsingha, Director of Music at St John's College, Cambridge
- Chris Martin, singer
- Adam Gibbons, known as Lack of Afro, musician
- David Webb, of the English National Opera
- Pat McCormick, clergyman and sportsman

== Notable staff ==
- Richard Langdon, organist
- Jackson of Exeter, Master of Choristers 1777 to 1800

== See also ==
- List of the oldest schools in the United Kingdom
