= Guy N. Smith =

English writer (1939–2020)

- Born: Guy Newman Smith; 21 November 1939; Hopwas, Staffordshire, England
- Died: 24 December 2020 (aged 81); Shrewsbury, England
- Occupations: Writer, banker, cartridge loader
- Writing career
- Pen name: Jonathan Guy; Gavin Newman; Peter Lynch; Joan Hudson; Wendy Davis; Patricia Mathews; Alan Myatt; Adrian Wood; Linda Lawrence
- Language: English
- Period: 1974–2020
- Genres: Horror, Fantasy, Children's literature, Non-fiction, softcore pornography
- Movement: Pulp
- Website: guynsmith.com

Guy Newman Smith (21 November 1939 – 24 December 2020) was an English writer best known for his pulp fiction-style horror, though he also wrote non-fiction, softcore pornography, and children's literature.

== Biography ==
Smith's father was a bank manager, his mother a pre-World War II historical novelist (E. M. Weale). Smith was educated at Lichfield Cathedral School and Wrekin College. His mother always encouraged his writing and he was first published at the age of 12 in The Tettenhall Observer, a local newspaper. Shooting (hunting) had always been an interest of Smith's, and he would have liked an apprenticeship in the gun trade. Not acceptable to his father, Smith's first job was in banking. In 1961 he designed and made a 12-bore shotgun, and during 1960–67 operated a small shotgun cartridge loading business.

In the late 1960s and into the early 1970s, Smith's writing focused mainly on shooting and he wrote regularly for many sporting magazines of the day. In 1999, he became Guns Editor of The Countryman's Weekly magazine, writing articles on shooting-related topics.

In the early 1970s, he was writing stories for U.K. men's magazines mainly published by Gold Star Publications (GSP) which paid extremely well and was a source of income for several authors in their early careers. In 1972, he launched a second-hand bookselling business that would eventually become Black Hill Books. Smith's intention had been to concentrate on this business and hopefully leave banking. It would ultimately be his writing that would allow him to do this.

Smith wrote his first horror novel, Werewolf by Moonlight, in 1974 published by New English Library (NEL). It spawned two direct sequels. However, he stated it was Night of the Crabs, published in 1976, that really launched his career as a writer. Spawning 11 sequels, the latest of which was published in 2019, the series chronicles invasions of various areas of the British coastline by giant man-eating crabs. Smith claimed that the 1981 film Island Claws, which told a similar story about giant crabs on the coast of Florida, was an adaptation of his work, though neither Smith nor his novel were credited on the film.

Smith had over 1,000 short stories and magazine articles published. He wrote a series of children's books under the pseudonym Jonathon Guy, two thrillers under the pseudonym Gavin Newman, and 12 non-fiction books on various countryside matters. He continued to write up to his death on 24 December 2020, with several works still in development at the time.

=== Reception ===
The Penguin Encyclopaedia of Horror and the Supernatural considers Smith's horror novels "endearing, imbued with lively storytelling and the tacky brilliance of the horror and science fiction cinema of the 1950s", but horror critic R. S. Hadji included Smith's novel The Sucking Pit on his list of the worst horror novels ever written. The pulpish nature of Smith's concepts and writing have been spoofed by the award-winning comedian and writer Matthew Holness in his Garth Marenghi persona.

His fanbase was global and, in particular, he had a large following from Poland, where over 35 of his novels were translated and published in the early 1990s. In recent years, he was again being published in Poland and in 2020 a Crabs omnibus was published in Russian. Several bootleg copies of his works had appeared in Russia in the 1990s.

=== Fanzines ===
Smith appreciated his fans and throughout his long career he produced a number of fanzines, many containing his short stories. They were originally produced as catalogues for his book selling business, but eventually changed into the fan club fanzine Graveyard Rendezvous, which ran for 41 editions. Smith and his wife even opened up their home and welcomed fans every September for an annual convention, an event that lasted over 25 years.

=== Personal life ===
Smith and his wife Jean had four children.

A lifelong pipe smoker, Smith won the British pipe smoking championship in 2003. He collected pipes and smoking ephemera and also wrote a book on tobacco, Tobacco Culture: A DIY Guide (1977). He was also an active pro-smoking campaigner. Later in his life, Smith lived near Clun, Shropshire. In his last two years he was embezzled of £2,400 by a former cleaning woman who came to manage his financial affairs on the internet; she was successfully prosecuted for this in 2022, following his death.

=== Death ===
By then infirm and awaiting hip surgery, Smith died on 24 December 2020, aged 81, following admission to the Royal Shrewsbury Hospital with a UTI and complications related to COVID-19.

== Selected bibliography ==
=== Werewolf series ===
- Werewolf by Moonlight (1974)
- Return of the Werewolf (1976)
- The Son of the Werewolf (1978)
- Werewolf Omnibus (all three novels and one new short story, "Spawn of the Werewolf") (2019)

=== Crabs series ===
- Night of the Crabs (1976)
- Killer Crabs (1978)
- The Origin of the Crabs (1979)
- Crabs on the Rampage (1981)
- Crabs' Moon (1984)
- Crabs: The Human Sacrifice (1988)
- Crabs' Fury (graphic novel) (1992)
- Crabs' Armada (chapbook) (2009)
- Crabs: Unleashed (chapbook) (2009)
- Killer Crabs: The Return (2012)
- Crabs Omnibus (collection of seven short stories) (2015)
- The Charnel Caves: A Crabs Novel (2019)

==== Crabs short stories ====
- "Crustacean Vengeance" (from Scare Care, ed. by Graham Masterton (Tor 1989))
- "Crustacean Carnage" (from Crabs Omnibus (2015))
- "The Decoy" (from Fear #13 (1990))
- "Revenge"
- "The Vigil"
- "The Survivor"
- "The Crabs" (from Peeping Tom (1992))
- "Crabs' Armada" (from The Cadaver (chapbook))
- "The Final Encounter"

=== Truckers series ===
- The Truckers 1: The Black Knights (1977)
- The Truckers 2: Hi-Jack! (1977)

=== Sabat series ===
- Sabat 1: The Graveyard Vultures (1982)
- Sabat 2: The Blood Merchants (1982)
- Sabat 3: Cannibal Cult (1982)
- Sabat 4: The Druid Connection (1983)
- Sabat 5: Wistman's Wood (2018)
- Sabat 6: The Return (2019)
- Dead Meat (1996) (omnibus of the first four books plus two new Sabat stories, Vampire Village and Hellbeat)

=== Thirst series ===
- Thirst (1980)
- Thirst II: The Plague (1987)

=== Deathbell series ===
- Deathbell (1980)
- Demons (1987)

=== Pit series ===
- The Sucking Pit (1975)
- The Walking Dead (1984)

=== Slime Beast series ===
- The Slime Beast (1975)
- Spawn of the Slime Beast (2015)

=== Writing as Jonathan Guy ===
- Cornharrow (1988)
- Badger Island (1993)
- Rak: The Story of an Urban Fox (1994)
- Pyne (1995)
- Hawkwood (1996)
- The Minister Geese (2012)

=== Writing as Gavin Newman ===
- The Hangman (1994) (republished again in 2015 under his real name, Guy N. Smith)
- An Unholy Way to Die (1999)

=== Disney books ===
Novelizations of Disney films. Paperback novels all originally published by New English Library in 1975 and reprinted by Pyramid Books in 1976, both with black and white drawings throughout.

- Sleeping Beauty (1975)
- Snow White and the Seven Dwarfs (1975)
- Song of the South (1975)
- The Legend of Sleepy Hollow (1975)

=== Softcore pornography books ===
- Sexy Secrets of Swinging Wives, Part 1: The Partner Swappers (as Anonymous)
- Sexy Confessions of a Relief Nurse (as Wendy Davis)
- Sexy Confessions of a Games Mistress (as Joan Hudson)
- Sexy Confessions of a Bank Clerk (as Peter Lynch)
- Sexy Confessions of a Secretary (as Patricia Mathews)
- Sexy Confessions of a Pop Performer (as Alan Myatt)
- Sexy Confessions of a Window Cleaner (as Adrian Wood)
- Sexy Confessions of a Magazine Writer (as Linda Lawrence)

=== Standalone novels ===
- Der Ruf des Werwolfs (1976) ('Call of the Werewolf', originally published in German only; published by Erich Pabel as a part of their "Vampir Horror Roman")
- The Ghoul (1976) (based on the 1975 film The Ghoul)
- Bamboo Guerillas (1977)
- Bats Out of Hell (1978)
- Locusts (1979)
- Satan's Snowdrop (1980)
- Caracal (1980)
- Doomflight (1981)
- Warhead (1981)
- Entombed (1981)
- Manitou Doll (1981)
- Wolfcurse (1981)
- The Pluto Pact (1982)
- The Lurkers (1982)
- Blood Circuit (1983)
- The Undead (1983)
- Accursed (1983)
- Throwback (1985)
- The Wood (1985)
- Abomination (1986)
- The Neophyte (1986)
- Snakes (1986)
- Cannibals (1986)
- Alligators (1987)
- Bloodshow (1987)
- Fiend (1988)
- The Island (1988)
- The Master (1988)
- The Camp (1989)
- The Festering (1989)
- Mania (1989)
- Phobia (1990)
- The Unseen (1990)
- Carnivore (1990)
- The Black Fedora (1991)
- The Resurrected (1991)
- The Knighton Vampires (1993)
- Witch Spell (1993)
- The Plague Chronicles (1993)
- The Dark One (1995)
- Dead End (1996)
- Water Rites (1997)
- The Pony Riders (1997)
- The Busker (1998)
- Deadbeat (2003)
- Blackout (2006)
- The Cadaver (2007)
- Maneater (2009)
- Nightspawn (2010)
- The Eighth Day (2012)
- Night of the Werewolf (2012) (Der Ruf des Werwolfs published in English for the first time)
- Psalm 151 (2013)
- Carnage (2016)
- The Reaper (2019)
- Satanic Armageddon (2021)

=== Non-fiction ===
- Gamekeeping and Shooting for Amateurs (1976)
- Tobacco Culture: A DIY Guide (1977)
- Ferreting and Trapping for Amateur Gamekeepers (1978)
- Hill Shooting and Upland Gamekeeping (1978)
- Profitable Fishkeeping (1979)
- Ratting and Rabbiting for Amateur Gamekeepers (1979)
- Sporting and Working Dogs (1979)
- Animals of the Countryside (1980)
- Moles and Their Control (1980)
- The Rough Shooter's Handbook (1986)
- Practical Country Living (1988)
- Writing Horror Fiction (1996)
- Hunting Big Cats in Britain (2000)
- Pipe Dreams: An Autobiography (2013)
- Midland Gun Company - A Short History (2016)
- A Century of the History of Shotgun Cartridges (2019)

=== Short story collections ===
- Horror Shorts: 1st Collection (June, 1999 by Bulldog Books)
- Horror Shorts: 2nd Collection
- Mystery & Horror Shorts: 1st Collection
- Science Fiction & Horror Shorts: 1st Collection
- Fifty Tales from the Fifties
- Hangman's Hotel and Other Stories (2013)
- Nightmares from the Black Hill (2017)
- Tales from the Graveyard (2020)
- The Casebook of Raymond Odell (2020)

=== Chapbooks ===
- The Cadaver
- Come On In and Join Us (Horror Express Publications)
- Crabs' Armada (April 2009, Ghostwriter Publications)
- The Doll (April 2009, Ghostwriter Publications)
- The Decoy (April 2009, Ghostwriter Publications)
- Crabs: Unleashed (October 2009, Ghostwriter Publications)
- Limited Edition (December 2009, Ghostwriter Publications)
