= Pat McCormick (priest) =

English cricketer, rugby union player and clergyman

Personal information
- Full name: William Patrick Glyn McCormick
- Born: 14 June 1877; Hull, Yorkshire, England
- Died: 16 October 1940 (aged 63); Westminster, London, England
- Batting: Right-handed
- Bowling: Slow left-arm orthodox
- Relatives: Joseph McCormick (father)

Domestic team information
- Years: Team
- 1907: Marylebone Cricket Club

Career statistics
Competition	First-class
Matches	1
Runs scored	17
Batting average	8.50
100s/50s	–/–
Top score	17
Balls bowled	6
Wickets	0
Bowling average	–
5 wickets in innings	–
10 wickets in match	–
Best bowling	–
Catches/stumpings	–/–
- Source: Cricinfo, 12 October 2021

William Patrick Glyn McCormick DSO (14 June 1877 — 16 October 1940) was an English first-class cricketer, rugby union player and clergyman.

The son of The Reverend Joseph McCormick, he was born at Hull in June 1877. He was educated at both The Cathedral School in Llandaff and the Exeter Cathedral School. From there he went up to St John's College, Cambridge. After graduating from Cambridge in 1899, McCormick initially gained employment as an assistant master at Rose Hill School in Tunbridge Wells. However, in 1900 he pursued an ecclesiastical career in the Church of England and was ordained as a deacon at Rochester Cathedral. He was appointed a curate at Shooter's Hill in Kent in 1901, before travelling to South Africa in 1902 where he was an acting chaplain in the final months of the Second Boer War. He spent the next decade in South Africa, where he held the posts of vicar at Cleveland, Transvaal from 1903 to 1910, and reverend in the Johannesburg suburb of Belgravia from 1910 to 1914. During a visit to England in 1907, McCormick made an appearance in first-class cricket for the Marylebone Cricket Club (MCC) against Leicestershire at Lord's. Batting twice in the match, he was dismissed for 17 runs in the MCC first innings by John King, while in their second innings he was dismissed without scoring by William Odell. His sporting talents further presented themselves in South Africa, where he played rugby union for Transvaal in the Currie Cup, where opponents would attempt to get the better of McCormick by swearing and cursing around him in an attempt to offend his pious nature. His abilities as a rugby player were as such that he was selected in the squad for the 1906–07 South Africa rugby union tour of Europe, but did not travel with the team after it was discovered he did not meet the residence qualifications for selection.

At the onset of the First World War in July 1914, McCormick returned to England to serve in the war as a chaplain. He was attached to the Royal Army Medical Corps, helping evacuate the wounded from the First Battle of Ypres. He did much for the morale of British soldiers and was influential in persuading the military to send more ambulances to the British Expeditionary Force. Later in the war, he was assigned as senior chaplain to the 3rd Guards Brigade from 1915 to 1917, bringing him into contact with the Prince of Wales, before being appointed to XIV Corps as assistant chaplain–general from 1917 to 1918. McCormick was awarded the Distinguished Service Order in the 1917 New Year Honours, in addition to being mentioned in dispatches on four occasions. Shortly after the conclusion of the war, he was assistant chaplain–general at Boulogne. Returning to England in 1919, McCormick was appointed rural dean of Croydon and was later appointed an honorary canon of Canterbury Cathedral in 1924. He was appointed vicar of St Martin-in-the-Fields in 1927 and was appointed chaplain to George V the following year, in place of the deceased Arthur James Mason. At St Martin-in-the-Fields, he did much to help the homeless and poor. Throughout the 1930s he regularly preached on BBC Radio and was the first clergyman to appear on British television. McCormick died at Westminster in October 1940. His brother was Joseph Gough McCormick, the Dean of Manchester in the first half of the 1920s.
