= Peter Giles (countertenor) =

Peter Giles (born 1939) is a British countertenor and writer of scientific books about countertenors. Giles began his career as a boy chorister in a traditional all-male choir in London. In the years from 1961 to 1966 his teacher was the celebrated countertenor John Whitworth. He first was appointed as alto lay clerk at Ely Cathedral, then at Lichfield Cathedral, followed by Canterbury Cathedral, where he was senior lay clerk from 1978 until 1994. During his career he had numerous performances as a soloist singer within the UK, but also in the US and in Canada. Occasionally he can be seen on TV with solo performances and readings.

He took additional lessons by Arthur Hewlett and specialised on 'Sinus Tone Control', a sound technique by Ernest George White, which puts special emphasis for singers on using the resonances in the head. In this method he gives lessons for speakers and singers as a professional voice teacher.

He performed with the male trio Canterbury Clerkes for 25 years. In 2000, he founded the mixed voice quintet Quodlibet, with which he made three albums. Besides that he plays the organ at different churches and conducts and coaches choirs.

Giles is also known for his publications on the subject of countertenor.

== Discography ==
=== As part of the trio Canterbury Clerkes ===
Six albums including

- Fill Your Glasses: Convivial English Glees 1986 (together with London Serpent Trio)

=== As part of the quintet Quodlibet ===
- In These Delightful Pleasant Groves
- North & South
- Mixed Assortment

=== Readings of poetry ===
- Choose Me, You English Words; Peter Giles reads Poems from Yesterday

== Books ==
- together with David Mallinder: The Counter Tenor, Ferederic Muller Limited, London 1982. According to WorldCat, the book is held in 243 libraries. The books is now superseded by
- The History and Technique of the Counter-Tenor: a study of the male high voice family, Scolar Press, Ashgate 1994 According to WorldCat, the book is held in 309 libraries
- A Basic Countertenor Method for Teacher and Student (Kahn & Averill, London, 2005, ISBN 978-1871082821)
