= The Cathedral School, Llandaff =

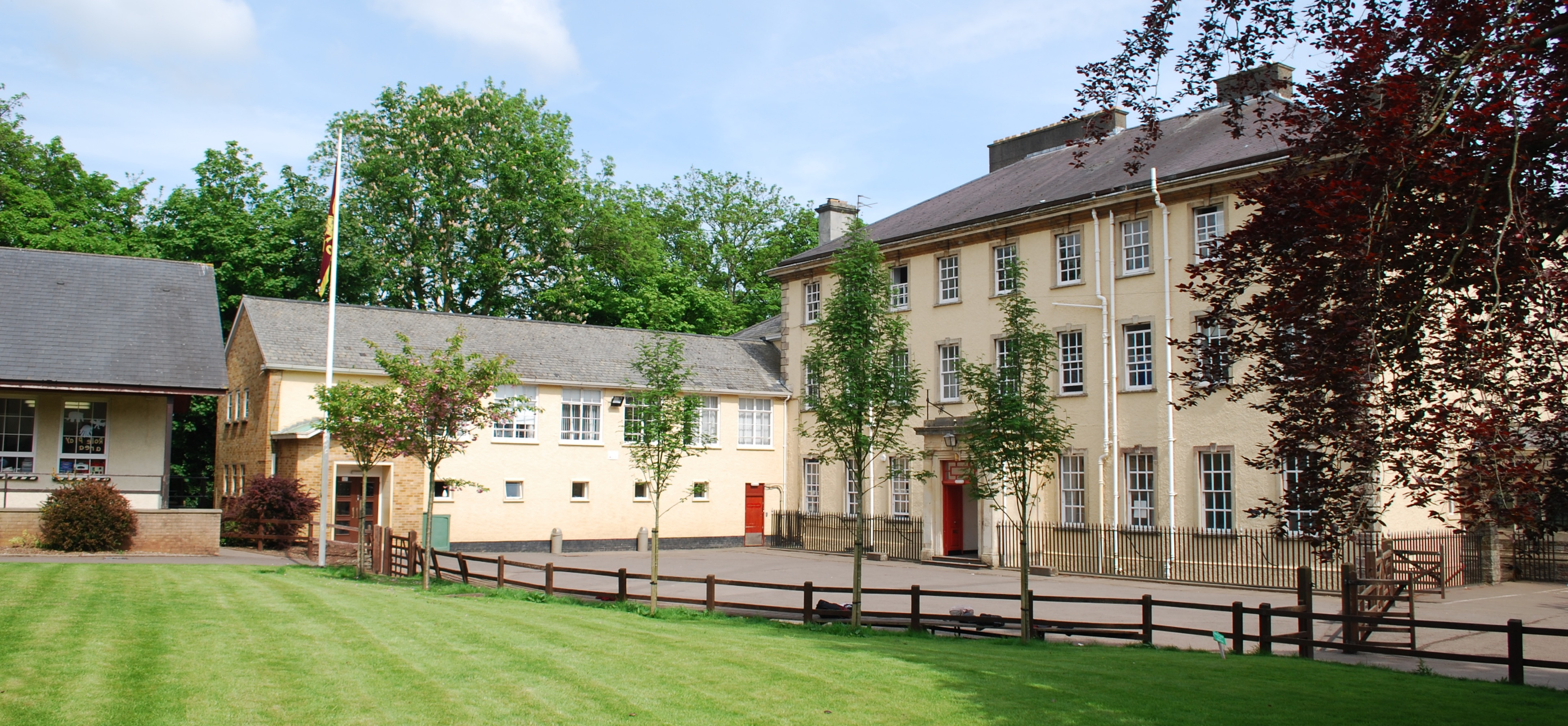

Location
- Cardiff Road, Llandaff; Cardiff, CF5 2YH; Wales; 51.4936°N 3.2160°W

Information
- Type: Independent school Choral foundation school Cathedral school
- Religious affiliation: Anglican
- Established: c. 9th century 1880 (current school)
- Founders: Dean John Vaughan, Canon Nathaniel Woodard
- Local authority: Cardiff Council
- Trust: Friends of the Cathedral School
- Department for Education URN: 402015 Tables
- Custos (Chairman): Gilbert Lloyd
- Head: Clare Victoria Sherwood
- Gender: Co-Educational
- Age: 3 to 18
- Enrolment: 807
- Language: English
- Houses: Teilo, Dyfrig, Euddogwy
- Colours: Black, Maroon and Gold
- Nickname: CSL
- Publication: Weekly Newsletter
- Alumni: Old Llandavians
- Website: http://www.cathedral-school.co.uk/

The Cathedral School, Llandaff (Welsh: Ysgol y Gadeirlan, Llandaf) is a coeducational private day school located in Llandaff, a district north of the Welsh capital Cardiff. Originally established as a choral foundation to train choir boys for the affiliated Llandaff Cathedral, it is now part of the Woodard Schools foundation and continues to provide choristers for the cathedral. It is the only surviving Anglican choir school in Wales and is a member of the ISC, IAPS and the Choir Schools Association. The Head is a member of the Headmasters' and Headmistresses' Conference of leading independent schools.

== History ==
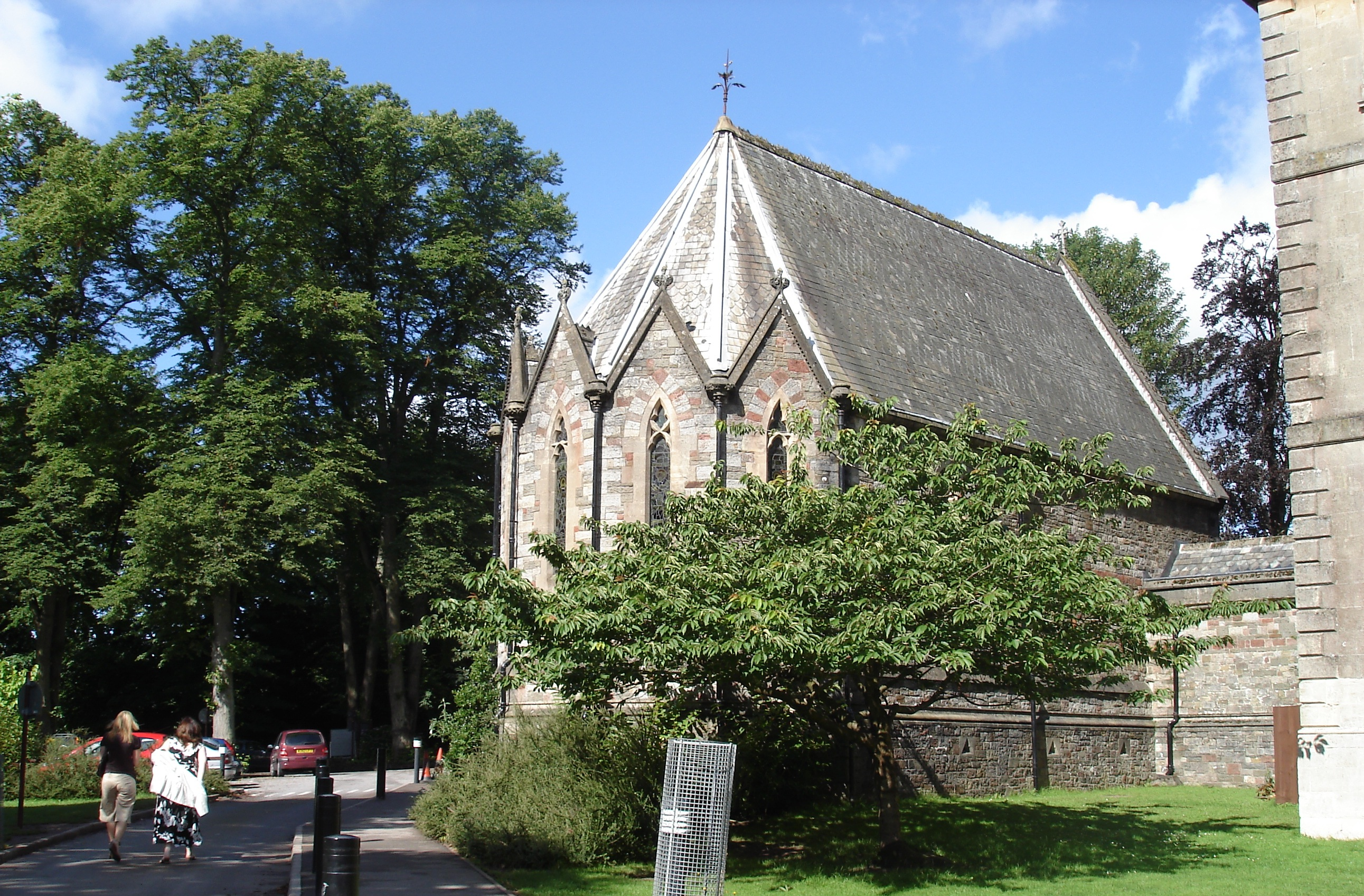
The school chapel

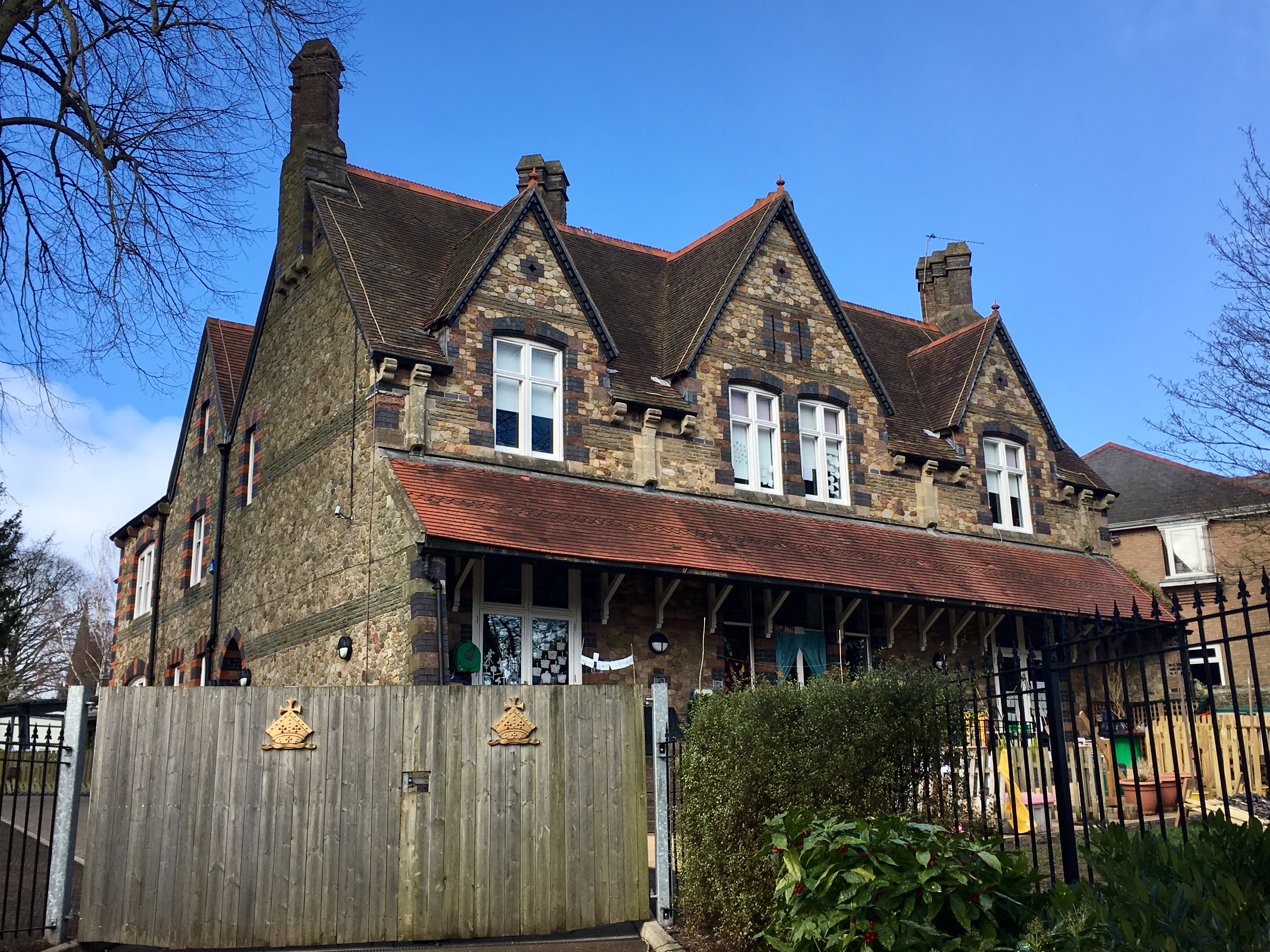
The Lodge, which houses Nursery and Infant pupils.

=== Buildings and Expansion ===
The original part of the School House was the old house of the Bishop of Llandaff before becoming a school. It is by far the oldest part of the school, and remains a Grade II listed building. The School Chapel was built in 1859 attached to the original School House building. It is dedicated to St. Nicholas (the patron saint of children) and St. Mary (the embodiment of parenting).

The School House has had the addition of a refectory, library and IT suites over the years, as well as the addition of a staff room. The Jubilee Building, Sports Hall, Gloucester Building, Pavilion, The Lodge, Sixth Form Centre, Woodard Building, and Memorial Hall are all more recent separate additions to the school as its enrolment and age range have expanded.

The Lodge, having had many uses in the decades before, was renovated and extended in 2013. This is used as the main building for the nursery and infant pupils.

The Sixth Form Centre was renovated and completed in 2013. The original building was the old Headmaster's House, which had since been vacated. The Sixth Form Centre serves as the main hub for students in Year 12 and 13, and the new building provided more space for study and relaxation.

The newer Woodard Building was completed in 2014. This was built on the site of the old nursery building once nursery pupils had moved to the Lodge. The Woodard Building includes 11 new classrooms: 2 biology laboratories, 3 rooms for languages, and 6 rooms for humanities.

The Memorial Hall was completed in 2017, opened on the site of a previous hall owned by Llandaff Cathedral. This is now used for the daily education of the nursery and infant pupils, and their lunch arrangements. Before the original hall was demolished, there was controversy over a number of local children's play groups being evicted from the new building, with the site being sold by Llandaff Cathedral primarily for financial reasons.

=== Roald Dahl ===
Author Roald Dahl (1916-1990) was a pupil at the school during the early to mid 1920s. He was involved in the "Great Mouse Plot of 1924", which he later described in his autobiography, Boy: Tales of Childhood, where he and a group of friends placed a dead mouse in a sweet jar at a local shop with an unpopular elderly female owner. The shopkeeper later informed the school's headmaster of the incident. This is the first of numerous occasions in which he outlines in great detail the perceived cruelty of corporal punishment in the schools he attended. The headmaster at this time was T. R. Coombes. He caned Dahl and his friends in his office after the shopkeeper came into the school and identified them.

== Structure ==
The school divides the academic year into Michaelmas, Lent, and Summer terms.

=== Sections ===
The Cathedral School consists of three sections: Infant School (ages 3–7), Junior School (ages 7–11) and Senior School (years 7–13). Sixth form teaching began in September 2013. In the 2012 Estyn inspection, the overarching judgements made by the inspectors were that the school's current performance was Excellent and that the school's prospects for improvement were Excellent.

=== Size ===
In 2018, there were 807 pupils and students enrolled at the school. Of these, 33 were in the nursery, 341 were in the infants and juniors, and 466 were in the seniors (of which 115 were in the Sixth Form). There are a maximum of 72 students per year from Years 7 to 11, equally split between the 3 senior Houses. Around 60% of the school's enrollment are boys This gender imbalance can be partially explained by the nearby Howell's School Llandaff that is girls-only from Years 7 to 11.

== Curriculum ==
=== Junior School ===
Modern Language education begins early, generally during Key Stage 2. In the 2005 inspection, pupils were reported to have performed well above the national average in National Curriculum tests.

=== Senior School ===
A traditional academic education, with sciences separately taught by specialists, along with a range of modern languages (French, Spanish, German) in addition to Latin, is delivered alongside very competitive sport (senior pupils have an unusually generous amount of time allocated to sport) and opportunities in the Arts. Pupils have generally performed well in the GCSE exams. The school was ranked top co-educational school in Wales in 2012 for GCSE success.

Every pupil up to Year 9 receives music tuition for 45 minutes per week in class. Interested pupils may choose to take GCSE Music.

2018 was the first year that Cathedral School pupils sat exams under the reformed English system of GCSEs (on a scale of 9 to 1 rather than A* to G). Although the 2017 cohort had sat English Language and Mathematics under the new system, the 2018 cohort sat nearly all their GCSEs under the new system.

== Pastoral care ==
=== House System ===
Every pupil in the Junior Section is a member of one of four junior Houses, named after important people in the founding of the school: Vaughans, Wains, Coombes, and Guys.

Every pupil in the Senior Section is a member of one of three senior Houses, named after the Llandaff saints: Dyfrig (yellow), Euddogwy (green), and Teilo (red). The pupils in each house are cared for by one of nine house tutors, who in turn are overseen by a housemaster or housemistress. Heads of house, assisted by their assistant head of house and their tutor teams, are responsible for pupils' pastoral care, oversight of their academic progress and personal development, as well as participation in House Events.

House Events help pupils to use key skills in productive and fun ways, and many competitions are very competitive. Major house events include House Singing (which is well-attended and is often held in RWCMD or the Reardon Smith Theatre), House Sports (arranged seasonally and including Hockey, Netball, Rounders, Rugby, Football, and Cricket) House Photography, Eisteddfod events, and Sports Day.

=== Student Leadership ===
Each year at the end of the Lent term, 10 prefects are chosen by the Head to assist with pastoral support and leadership. Positions include Head, Deputy Head, and Head of House, with one person of each gender simultaneously occupying each position.

=== Religion ===
The school provides an explicitly Christian education, with all senior students studying Religious Studies at GCSE level. All pupils and students from Year 3 upwards attend weekly 20 minute services in Llandaff Cathedral, with a longer Eucharist at the beginning of each half term. The school Chapel is available for most of the day, and serves as a quiet place for pupils and staff. The school's Chaplain oversees all religious activities in the school, as well as teaching and supporting the pastoral team.

== Activities ==
=== Music ===
The Cathedral School is well known for its strong musical tradition. The school continues to provide both the Boy and Girl Choristers for Llandaff Cathedral, and as such has very strong choirs. The boy choristers have sung in the Wales Millennium Centre, with Welsh National Opera, Bryn Terfel and Carlo Rizzi. Music is very strong at the Cathedral School, with several pupils at Grade 8 standard. The music department is housed on the lower floor of the Jubilee Building, with a full range of instruments available and specialist teachers of over 20 instruments. There are numerous musical groups, including: a chamber choir, orchestra, jazz band, flute choir, and string and percussion ensembles.

=== Drama ===
Drama has thrived only recently in the school but is rapidly expanding. Pupils write their own work for 'gala evenings' and many pupils are on the books of National Youth Theatre. The drama department is housed on the upper floor of the Jubilee Building, where the Drama Studio serves both as the drama teaching rooms and as a place for presentations and events. The drama department puts on two plays every year, in December and in June. Summer productions have included:HMS Pinafore,Oliver!, Guys and Dolls, Fiddler on the Roof, Joseph, High School Musical, and Blood Brothers.

=== Sport ===
Over twenty sports are played at the school, with pupils at international level in cricket, badminton, rugby, gymnastics and sailing. Unusual for a choral foundation school, the school also offers scholarships based on athletic ability. All of the senior section take part in 2 lessons of Games a week, choosing from the seasonal sports of: Rugby, Football, and Cricket (for the boys); Hockey, Netball, and Rounders (for the girls); Rowing, Tennis, Climbing and Squash (mixed gender, year-round sports held outside of school).

== Notable alumni ==
Former students of The Cathedral School, Llandaff are referred to as Old Llandavians.

- Rakesh Aggarwal, businessman
- David Bevan, singer, sang in Westminster Abbey Choir at the coronation of Queen Elizabeth II
- Donald Box, MP
- Geoffrey Chamberlain, obstetrician and gynaecologist
- Charlotte Church, singer and TV personality
- Roald Dahl, author
- Roger Everest, barrister
- Will Harries, Welsh rugby union player
- Simon Hughes, MP
- David Mahoney, conductor and producer, member of Only Men Aloud
- Pat McCormick, clergyman and sportsman
- John Morgan, Archbishop of Wales
- Gordon Phillips (priest), Anglican priest and author
- John Robins, Wales international rugby player
- Louis Rees-Zammit, Welsh international rugby player
- David Rowe-Beddoe, Baron Rowe-Beddoe, chairman of the Wales Millennium Centre
- Ruaidhri Smith, Scottish cricketer
- Robin Sowden-Taylor, Wales international rugby player
- Peter Temple-Morris, Baron Temple-Morris of Llandaff in the County of South Glamorgan and of Leominster in the County of Herefordshire, politician
- Richard William Leslie Wain, soldier, awarded the Victoria Cross
- Edward William Williamson, Bishop of Swansea and Brecon
- Rex Willis, Wales international rugby player
- Peter Wingfield, actor
- T. C. Worsley, theatre and television critic

== Headteachers ==
- C.E. Butler (1880–1883)
- E. Owen (1883–1889)
- J.E. Stevenson-More (1889–1905)
- P.R. Cleave (1905–1912)
- G.L. Robanthan & R. Brice-Smith (1912–1919)
- T.R. Coombes (1919–1946)
- N.L. Westbury-Jones (1946–1957)
- R.J.B. Hulland (1957–1975)
- G.L. Hill (1975–1983)
- J.C. Knapp (1983–1993)
- D.A. Evans (Acting Head) (1993–1994)
- P.L. Gray (1994–2008)
- S. Morris (2008–2016 )
- C.V. Sherwood (2016–present)
