= St John's College School =

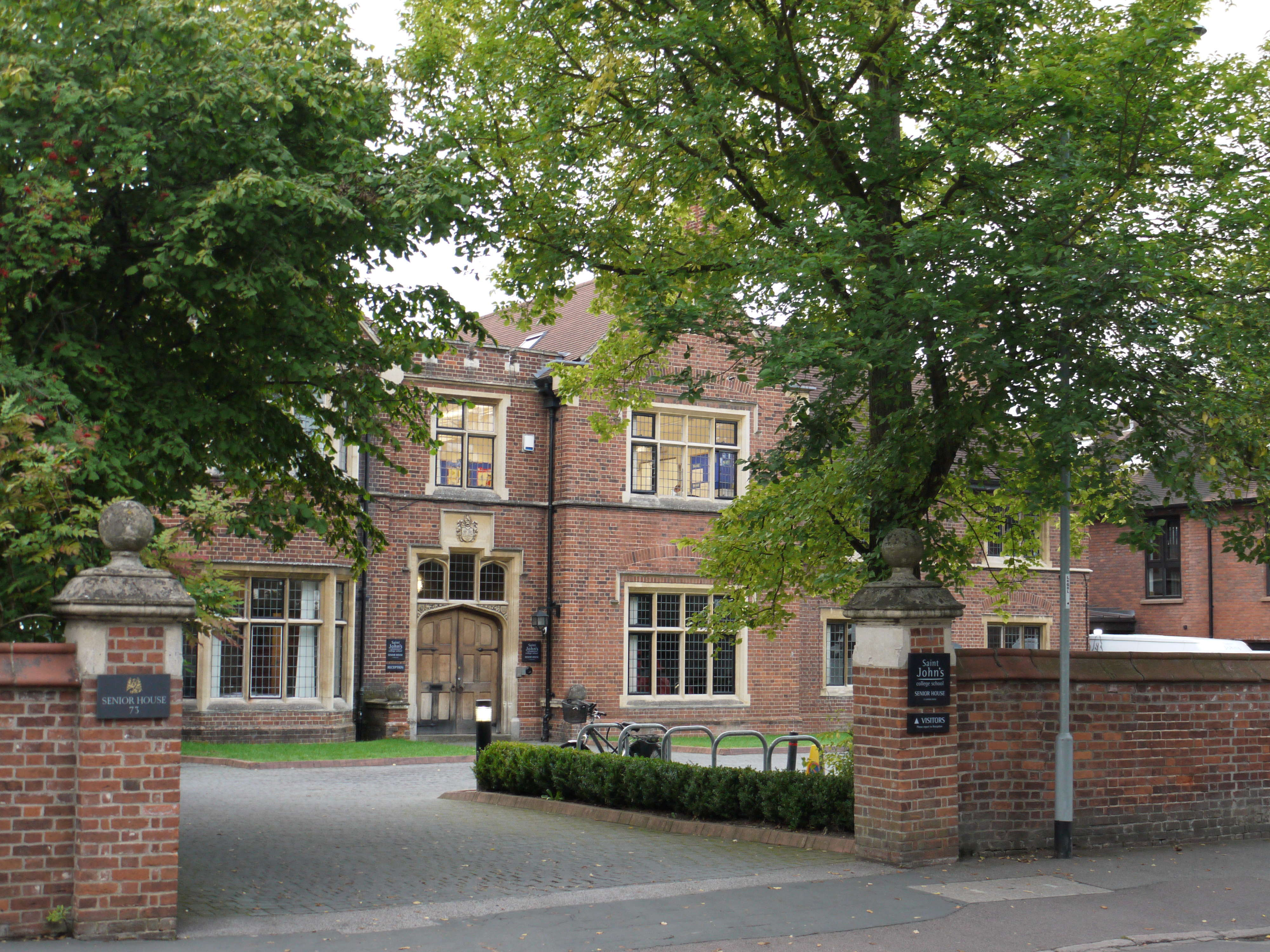

Location
- 73 Grange Road; Cambridge, Cambridgeshire, CB3 9AB; England
- Coordinates: 52.20972°N 0.10586°E

Information
- Type: Private preparatory School
- Established: 1661; 365 years ago
- Local authority: Cambridgeshire
- Department for Education URN: 110915 Tables
- Head Mistress: Sarah Wright
- Gender: Coeducational
- Age: 4 to 13
- Enrolment: 460
- Website: www.sjcs.co.uk

St John's College School is a co-educational preparatory school founded in the 17th century for the education of the choristers of the Choir of St John's College, Cambridge, England. The 20 choristers are educated in the school, which comprises 460 boys and girls aged 4–13. The Head Mistress is Sarah Wright. The school is divided into two halves, Byron house for KG, T1, T2, Form 1 and Form 2 (Reception - Year 4) whilst the 2nd part of the school, further up Grange Road, is in charge of Forms 3-6 (Years 5 - 8).

In 2024, the school was named the UK's 'Pre-Prep School of the Year' at the Independent Schools of the Year Awards. It has also been awarded national Best Prep School and national Best Prep School Head in the Tatler Schools Awards. The most recent integrated inspection by the Independent Schools Inspectorate in 2013 rated the school as excellent across all categories apart from the quality of pupils’ achievements and learning which was graded "exceptional". Although exhibiting strength across all subject areas, as a choir school St John's is particularly successful in music. Between 2008 and 2013, 48 pupils obtained music awards to senior schools, including many non-choristers.

== History ==
The school is believed to have been founded in 1661 with the appointment of "Mr Loosemore" to act as organist and for "lerning the choristers". Two endowments in the early 1680s in particular secured the continuous history of the Choir from the Restoration onwards. The 22nd Master of St John's, Bishop Gunning, gave money to support the 'maintenance of some singing youths'. The Senior Fellow, John Ambrose, set up a fund for the 'maintenance of a Quire in the Chapel'.

In 1819 an arrangement was made between St John's College and Trinity College to share a choir, organist and schoolmaster, and this continued until 1856. In this year John's again established its own school, in All Saint's Passage, which later moved to Bridge Street. From 1875, boys other than choristers and probationers were admitted.

In the early 1950s, owing partly to financial pressures, St John's College considered closing the school. However, the then organist George Guest opined that this would be detrimental to the future of the choir and urged the college to reconsider. He sought support for his cause from outside the college, from figures such as the composer Ralph Vaughan Williams, who wrote to the college saying "Save St John's Choir School at all costs". The Master of the College, J.S. Boys Smith was consequently persuaded to retain the school. It was moved to larger premises in its present location in Grange Road, Cambridge, and in 1955 had recruited over 100 pupils. This was still not considered sufficient to meet the needs of the choir and so in order to provide enough choristers of a sufficiently high standard, by 1957 a boarding house was opened catering for 26 boarders. The school doubled in size when it amalgamated with the former Byron House School in 1973. A new boarding house opened in 2010.

== Notable alumni ==
- Iestyn Davies
- Harry Gregson-Williams
- Ben Gummer
- Will Hooley
- Edward Hyde (Cambridge cricketer)
- Simon Keenlyside
- Nick Knight (cricketer)
- Clive Mantle

== See also ==
- List of choir schools
