= Cathedral Close, Lichfield =

Historic set of buildings in Staffordshire, England

Coordinates: 52.684964°N 1.831758°W

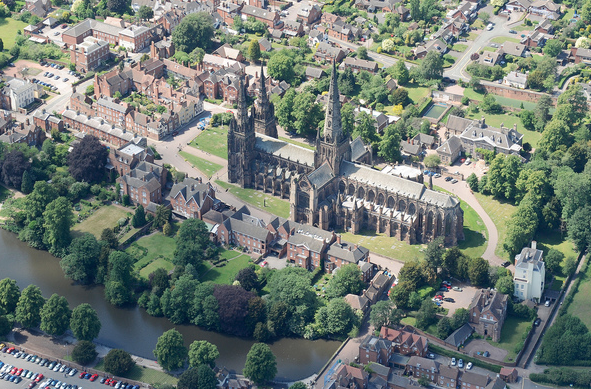
The Lichfield Cathedral Close from the air

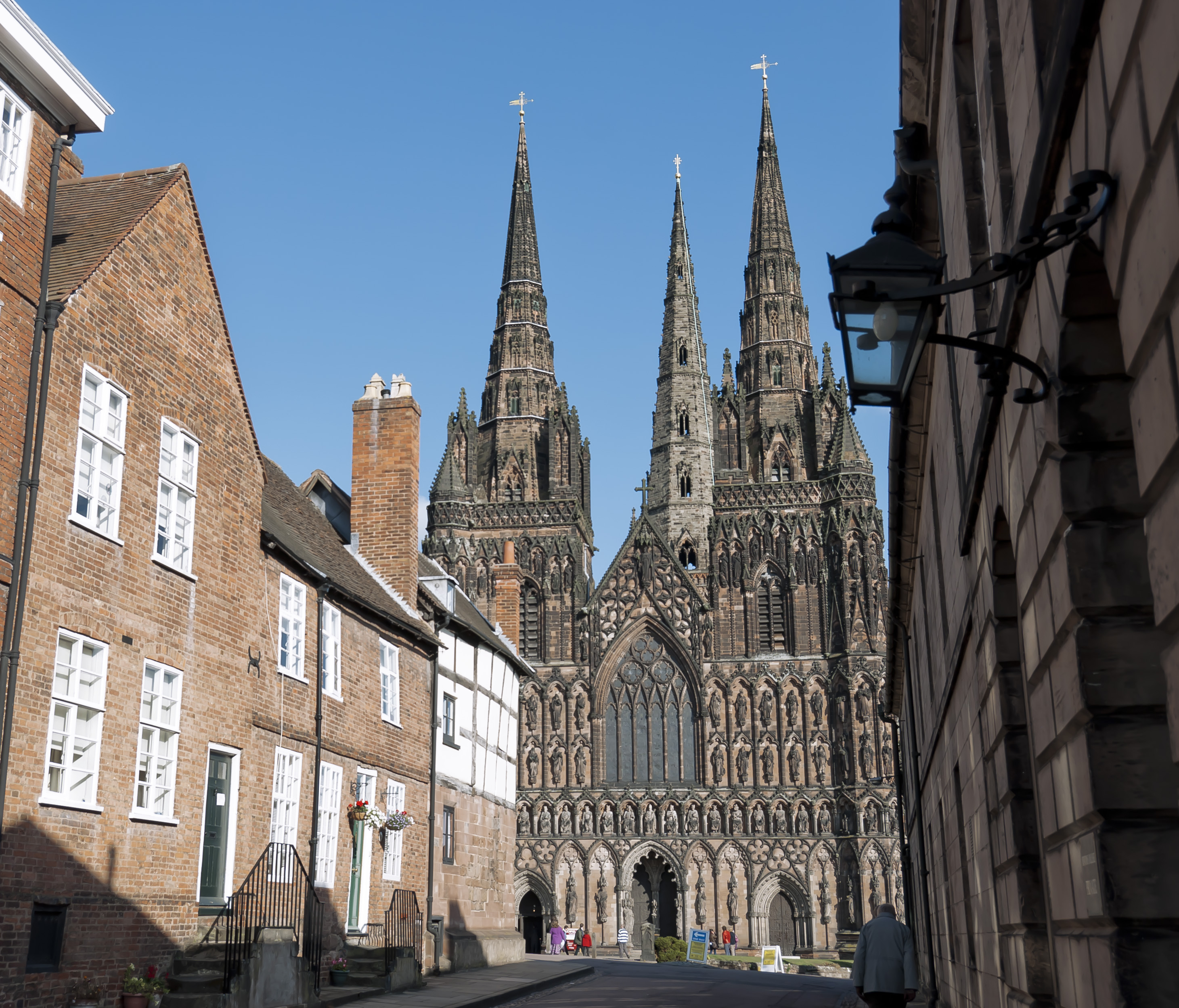
Western entrance to the Cathedral Close

The Cathedral Close is a historic set of buildings surrounding Lichfield Cathedral in Lichfield, England. The Close comprises buildings associated with the cathedral and the clergy which encircle the cathedral. The Close grew up around the cathedral during medieval times and today some medieval buildings remain in the Close but the majority of buildings date from the 17th, 18th and 19th centuries.

== Fortifications ==
It is likely the first cathedral had a vallum around the ecclesiastical centre. It is unclear but possible Bishop Clinton fortified the Cathedral in the 12th century. A deep man-made ditch was dug on three sides and the south was defended naturally by Minster Pool. This fortification effectively created the cathedral close.

In 1299 Bishop Langton was licensed to wall the Close in stone and crenellate it. He also rebuilt the gates. The work was unfinished at his death in 1321. In 1322, during the crisis involving Thomas, Earl of Lancaster, the chapter under royal pressure ordered the immediate clearance of the ditch and the completion of the west tower of the south-east gate. The fortification comprised corner towers and interval towers along the wall. An octagonal tower at the north-east corner was incorporated in Langton's palace; its base still survives. At the south-east corner, there was a parapet along the top of the wall and a projecting turret, which survive as part of the later St Mary's House. The south-west tower was recorded in 1312–13 and was shown on John Speed's 1610 map of Lichfield; it had been demolished by 1661. The north-west tower had a statue of Bishop Walter, presumably Walter Langton, in the 1390s; the tower was evidently another Civil War casualty. Three interval towers were placed on the east wall, two of them incorporated in Langton's palace and the third on the site of the later Selwyn House. The Dean's Tower, so called in 1315, apparently stood on the west wall; it had been demolished by 1661.

The gate built by Langton at the south-east corner of the Close had two towers. The eastern one, whose base was excavated in the late 1980s, was a half-octagon with 12-foot sides. The western tower was presumably of similar dimension. The gate had a portcullis in 1376. There was a drawbridge, still in existence in the earlier 18th century, which crossed the outflow of water from Minster Pool, and also a wicket for pedestrians. The gate was removed in the mid-18th century in order to improve access for coaches into the Close. A northward extension of the eastern tower was used as a porter's lodge in the early 17th century. After being damaged in the Civil War, it was rebuilt and in 1666 was assessed for tax on four hearths. By 1734 the porter or verger lived in a house at the west gate, and the former lodge was demolished between 1812 and 1836.

The west gate was completed by the chapter in the time of Bishop Northburgh, 1322–58. It was in the form of a tall block with side windows. It was decorated with coats of arms, and there was a statue of the Virgin Mary by 1530. The gate was demolished in 1800 to make room for Newton's College. Traces of its stonework survive on the north side of the road from Beacon Street. A house, evidently at the north-west corner of the gate, was let in 1661 to James Barrow, a tailor. He converted a dungeon underneath the house into a cellar for his own use and was ordered by the chapter to dig another dungeon of the same size with a hole to provide light. In 1734 the house was occupied by the verger; it was rebuilt in 1835 and survives as No. 1 the Close. There is no evidence that the Close ditch ever contained water at the time of the walls being constructed. A map, dated 1610, by John Speed does not show a moat. The increased fortification by Royalists occupying the Close, late 1642 to early 1643, included a complete encircling of the fortress cathedral with a moat. At the west gate and southeast postern gate were drawbridges over a moat. Royalists attempting to breach the northeast wall in April 1643 first drained the moat before placing explosives under the wall. After occupying the Close, they repaired the moat. In the third siege, 1646, the Close was heavily fortified and included a moat. By the mid-17th century it was called the Dimple or Dimble, a name meaning a deep hollow filled with trees or bushes.

=== Devastation of the Civil War ===
There were three sieges of Lichfield during the English Civil War in the period 1643–1646. The cathedral authorities with a certain following were for Charles I, but the townsfolk generally sided with Parliament, and this led to the fortification of the close in 1643. Robert Greville, 2nd Baron Brooke, led an assault against it, but was killed by a bullet from John Dyott (known as 'dumb' because he was a deaf mute) who along with his brother Richard Dyott had taken up a position on the battlements of the central cathedral spire on 2 March 1643. Brooke's deputy John Gell, took over the siege and the Royalist garrison surrendered to him two days later.

In April of the same year (1643) Prince Rupert led an Royalist expeditionary force from Oxford to recapture Lichfield. The Siege of Lichfield started on 8 April. During the second assault Rupert's engineers detonated an explosive mine to breach the defences. Unable to defend the Close, Colonel Russell, the parliamentary commander of the garrison, surrendered on terms to Rupert on 21 April.

The Close was placed under the governorship of Richard Bagot of the nearby Blithfield Hall, who maintained a strong garrison there, consisting of some 300 infantry and 200 cavalry.

The cathedral suffered extensive damage: the central spire was demolished, the roofs ruined and all the stained glass smashed. Bishop Hacket began the restoration of the cathedral in the 1660s, aided by substantial funds donated by the restored monarch, but it was not until the 19th century that the damage caused during the Civil War was fully repaired.

== Notable buildings ==
- Bishop's Palace – In the north east corner built in 1687, replacing Langton's medieval palace which was destroyed during the Civil War. The building is now occupied by the Cathedral School.
- The Deanery – Lying north of the cathedral the Deanery was built in 1707 and is a fine example of the Queen Anne style of architecture.
- Vicars Close – In 1315 Bishop Langton gave the vicars land at the west end of the Close. The Vicars built their houses college style around two courtyards with a common hall at the west end of the central range. Vicars' Close is at the northern courtyard of the two and has four ranges of houses and a common hall. The houses were built c.1315–1500, with the common hall at the west end of the central range rebuilt in 1756 and No.5 in the west range rebuilt in 1764. The most complete row of medieval building is along the north side of Vicars' Close, where the timber framed houses are all of one bay; they are jettied to the south and have a tall chimney stack against their north wall. The buildings in the courtyard are all Grade II* listed buildings.
- Erasmus Darwin House – On the west side of the Close facing Beacon Street. The house was built in the 18th century and was the home of poet and physician Erasmus Darwin.
