= Lichfield Cathedral School =

Private day school in Staffordshire, England

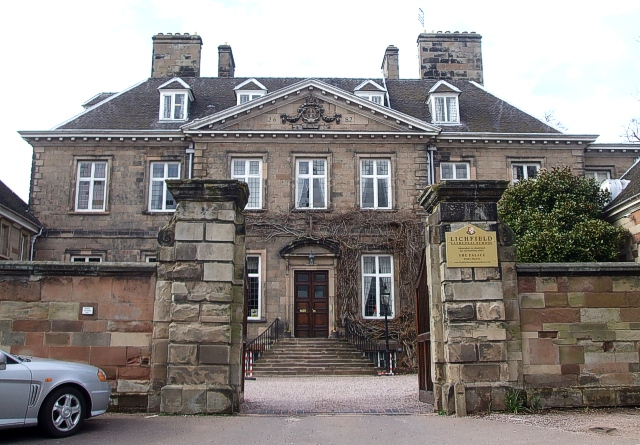
- The former Bishop's Palace now houses Lichfield Cathedral School.

Location
- The Palace; Lichfield, Staffordshire, WS13 7LH; England
- Coordinates: 52.685°N 1.832°W

Information
- Type: Private day school Choral foundation school Cathedral school
- Religious affiliation: Church of England
- Established: c. 1300; 726 years ago 1942 (current school)
- Local authority: Staffordshire
- Department for Education URN: 124474 Tables
- Chair of Governors: Eric Lunt
- Headmistress: Susan Hannam
- Gender: Coeducational
- Age: 3 to 18
- Enrolment: 500~
- Houses: 4
- Colours: Black, yellow
- Website: http://lichfieldcathedralschool.co.uk/

Lichfield Cathedral School is a private day school in the city of Lichfield, Staffordshire, England. It traces its lineage to the 14th century when Lichfield Cathedral made provisions to educate its choristers. The school in its current form now educates over 500 boys and girls from nursery to sixth form. While the school still serves its primary purpose of educating choristers of the cathedral, it is open to pupils of all faiths.

== History ==
Since the earliest days of its choral foundation, which can be traced back as far as the early 14th century, the cathedral has made provision for the appointment and education of boy choristers. Choristers were housed and educated at Dam Street, just outside the Cathedral Close. After the start of the Second World War, the Dean and chapter decided to formally establish a school. St Chad's Cathedral School, as this independent preparatory school for boys was known, was opened on 27 January 1942. During the first ten years, the school experienced much growth and was in need of larger facilities. In 1953, it moved to the Bishop's Palace, its current location.

Girls were admitted to the school for the first time in 1974. In 1981, the school became a financially independent charitable trust and took on its new name, Lichfield Cathedral School. A pre-preparatory department was established in St Mary's School on the far side of Minster Pool in 1982. By 1988, the pre-prep had outgrown St Mary's and moved to its own premises. The School acquired St John's Preparatory School in Longdon Green in 2006 and the two schools amalgamated. The Pre-Prep (junior school, aged 3–8) is now situated on the Longdon site; the vacated space in the Close has been adapted for older year groups and specialist teaching. In September 2010, the school accepted its first sixth form pupils.

In March 2012, a fire broke out in one of the main buildings and damaged an office. The school was commended by Staffordshire Fire and Rescue Service for their prompt action and coordination of the evacuation.

In September 2023, a request by the school to remove a mature 70-year old walnut tree's preservation order was denied by the local council. The school had requested the tree's removal to prevent allergic reactions among pupils with nut allergies, which one local councillor described as "overkill."

== Houses ==
Each pupil is assigned to a house upon entry. The houses are named after famous people associated with Lichfield.

House	Colour
Barber (previously Boswell)	
Darwin	
Garrick	
Johnson	

== Music ==
The Cathedral School is noted for its strong musical tradition. In 2011, the Cathedral Choir broadcast their Christmas Day Eucharist live on BBC One and most recently, they sang live on BBC Radio 3 for its Choral Evensong programme. At age 13, boys whose voices have changed may receive music scholarships at the school or elsewhere. A new girls' choir was started in 2006 for 10-14 year-olds and, more recently, the choir was admitted into the cathedral's choral foundation.

== Notable alumni ==
=== Non-Fictional ===
- Guy N. Smith, writer mainly of horror fiction.

=== Fictional ===
- Matthew Shardlake, protagonist of the Shardlake series, written by C. J. Sansom
