= Countertenor =

High classical male singing voice

A countertenor (also contra tenor) is a type of classical male singing voice whose vocal range is equivalent to that of the female contralto or mezzo-soprano, generally extending from around E_{3} to D_{5} or E_{5}, although a sopranist (a specific kind of countertenor) may match the soprano's range of around C_{4} to C_{6}. Countertenors speak with tenor or baritone voices.

The nature of the countertenor voice has radically changed throughout musical history, from a modal voice, to a modal and falsetto voice, to the primarily falsetto voice that is denoted by the term today. This is partly because of changes in human physiology (increase in body height) and partly because of fluctuations in pitch.

The term first came into use in England during the mid-17th century and was in wide use by the late 17th century. The use of adult male falsettos in polyphony, commonly in the soprano range, was known in European all-male sacred choirs for some decades previous, as early as the mid-16th century. Modern-day ensembles such as the Tallis Scholars and the Sixteen have countertenors on alto parts in works of this period. There is no evidence that falsetto singing was known in Britain before the early 17th century, when it was occasionally heard on soprano parts.

In the second half of the 20th century, there was great interest in and renewed popularity of the countertenor voice, partly due to pioneers such as Alfred Deller and Russell Oberlin, as well as the increased popularity of Baroque opera and the need of male singers to replace the castrati roles in such works. Although the voice has been considered largely an early music phenomenon, there is a growing modern repertoire collection for countertenors, especially in contemporary music.

== Terminology ==
Particularly in the British choral tradition, the terms "male soprano" and "male alto" serve to identify men who rely on falsetto vocal production, rather than the modal voice, to sing in the soprano or alto vocal range. Elsewhere, the terms have less universal currency. Some authorities do accept them as descriptive of male falsettists, although this view is subject to controversy; they would reserve the term "countertenor" for men who, like Russell Oberlin, sing in the alto range with little or no falsetto, equating it with haute-contre and the Italian tenore contraltino. Adherents to this view maintain that a countertenor will have unusually short vocal cords and consequently a higher speaking voice and lower range and tessitura than their falsettist counterparts, perhaps from D_{3} to D_{5}. Operatic vocal classification, on the other hand, prefers the terms "countertenor" and "sopranist" to "male alto" and "male soprano", and some scholars consider the latter two terms inaccurate owing to physiological differences between male and female vocal production.

== History ==
=== Early centuries ===
In polyphonic compositions of the 14th and early 15th centuries, the contratenor was a voice part added to the basic two-part contrapuntal texture of discant (superius) and tenor (from the Latin tenere, which means to hold, since this part "held" the music's melody, while the superius descanted upon it at a higher pitch). Though having approximately the same range as the tenor, it was generally of a much less melodic nature than either of these other two parts. With the introduction in about 1450 of four-part writing by composers such as Ockeghem and Obrecht, the contratenor split into contratenor altus and contratenor bassus, which were respectively above and below the tenor. Later the term became obsolete: in Italy, contratenor altus became simply altus, in France, haute-contre, and in England, countertenor. Though originally these words were used to designate a vocal part, they are now used to describe singers of that part, whose vocal techniques may differ.

In the Catholic Church during the Renaissance, women were banned from singing in church services. Countertenors, though rarely described as such, therefore found a prominent part in liturgical music, whether singing a line alone or with boy trebles or altos. (Spain had a long tradition of male falsettists singing soprano lines). Countertenors were hardly ever used for roles in early opera, however, the rise of which coincided with the arrival of a fashion for castrati. For example, the latter took several roles in the first performance of Monteverdi's L'Orfeo (1607). Castrati were already prominent by this date in Italian church choirs, replacing both falsettists and trebles; the last soprano falsettist singing in Rome, Juan [Johannes de] San[c]tos (a Spaniard), died in 1652. In Italian opera, by the late seventeenth century castrati predominated, while in France, the modal high tenor, called the haute-contre, was established as the voice of choice for leading male roles.

In England Purcell wrote significant music for a higher male voice that he called a "counter-tenor", for example, the roles of Secrecy and Summer in The Fairy-Queen (1692). "These lines have often challenged modern singers, who have been unsure whether they are high tenor parts or are meant for falsettists". Contemporary vocal treatises, however, make clear that Purcell's singers would have been trained to blend both methods of vocal production. In Purcell's choral music the situation is further complicated by the occasional appearance of more than one solo part designated "countertenor", but with a considerable difference in range and tessitura. Such is the case in Hail, bright Cecilia (The Ode on St Cecilia's Day 1692) in which the solo, "'Tis Nature's Voice", has the range F_{3} to B♭_{4} (similar to those stage roles cited previously), whereas, in the duet, "Hark each tree", the countertenor soloist sings from E_{4} to D_{5} (in the trio "With that sublime celestial lay"). Later in the same work, Purcell's manuscript designates the same singer, Mr Howel, described as "a High Contra tenor" to perform in the range G_{3} to C_{4}; it is very likely that he took some of the lowest notes in a well-blended "chest voice".

=== 18th century ===
"The Purcell counter-tenor 'tenor' did not flourish in England much beyond the early years of the [eighteenth] century; within twenty years of Purcell's death Handel had settled in London and opera seria, which was underpinned entirely by Italian singing, soon became entrenched in British theatres". In parallel, by Handel's time, castrati had come to dominate the English operatic stage as much as that of Italy (and indeed most of Europe outside France). They also took part in several of Handel's oratorios, though countertenors, too, occasionally featured as soloists in the latter, the parts written for them being closer in compass to the higher ones of Purcell, with a usual range of A_{3} to E_{5}. They also sang the alto parts in Handel's choruses. It was as choral singers within the Anglican church tradition (as well as in the secular genre of the glee) that countertenors survived as performers throughout the 18th and 19th centuries. Otherwise they largely faded from public notice.

=== 20th century ===
The most visible person of the countertenor revival in the twentieth century was Alfred Deller, an English singer and champion of authentic early music performance. Deller initially identified as an "alto", but his collaborator Michael Tippett recommended the archaic term "countertenor" to describe his voice. In the 1950s and 60s, his group, the Deller Consort, was important in increasing audiences' awareness (and appreciation) of Renaissance and Baroque music. Deller was the first modern countertenor to achieve fame and has had many prominent successors. Benjamin Britten wrote the leading role of Oberon in his setting of A Midsummer Night's Dream (1960) especially for Deller. The countertenor role of Apollo in Britten's Death in Venice (1973) was created by James Bowman, the best-known amongst the next generation of English countertenors. Russell Oberlin was Deller's American counterpart and another early music pioneer. Oberlin's success was entirely unprecedented in a country that did not have much experience of performance of works prior to Bach, and it paved the way for the great success of countertenors following him. Oberlin, however, harked back to the earlier tradition of countertenors using only their modal voices.

Today, countertenors are much in demand in many forms of classical music. In opera, many roles originally written for castrati (castrated males) are now sung and recorded by countertenors, as are some trouser roles originally written for female singers. The former category is much more numerous and includes Orfeo in Gluck's Orfeo ed Euridice and many Handel roles, such as the name parts in Rinaldo, Giulio Cesare, Serse and Orlando, and Bertarido in Rodelinda. Mozart also had castrati roles in his operas, including Aminta in Il re pastore, Cecilio in Lucio Silla, Ramiro in La finta giardiniera, Idamante in Idomeneo, and Sesto in La clemenza di Tito.

Many modern composers other than Britten have written, and continue to write, countertenor parts, both in choral works and opera, as well as songs and song-cycles for the voice. Men's choral groups such as Chanticleer and the King's Singers employ the voice to great effect in a variety of genres, including early music, gospel, and even folk songs. Other recent operatic parts written for the countertenor voice include Edgar in Aribert Reimann's Lear (1978), the messenger in his Medea (2010), Prince Go-Go in György Ligeti's Le Grand Macabre (1978), the title role in Philip Glass's Akhnaten (1983), Claire in John Lunn's The Maids (1998), the Refugee in Jonathan Dove's Flight (1998), Trinculo in Thomas Adès's The Tempest (2004), the Boy in George Benjamin's Written on Skin (2012) and several others (see Roles in opera below).

== Vocal range ==
Countertenor vocal range (E_{3}–E_{5}) notated on the treble staff (left) and on piano keyboard in green with dot marking middle C (C4)

The vocal range of a countertenor is equivalent to that of the female contralto or mezzo-soprano voice types. A trained countertenor will typically have a vocal centre similar in placement to that of a contralto or mezzo-soprano. Peter Giles, a professional countertenor and noted author on the subject, defines the countertenor as a musical part rather than as a vocal style or mechanism. In modern usage, the term "countertenor" is essentially equivalent to the medieval term contratenor altus (see above). In this way, a countertenor singer can be operationally defined as a man who sings the countertenor part, whatever vocal style or mechanism is employed. The countertenor range is generally equivalent to an alto range, extending from approximately E_{3} to D_{5} or E_{5}. In comparison to female voices the male voice usually has an extended range towards the low notes, but the lowest parts of the range are usually not used. In actual practice, it is generally acknowledged that a majority of countertenors sing with a falsetto vocal production for at least the upper half of this range, although most use some form of "chest voice" (akin to the range of their speaking voice) for the lower notes. The most difficult challenge for such a singer is managing the lower middle range, for there are normally a few notes (around B♭_{3}) that can be sung with either vocal mechanism, and the transition between registers must somehow be blended or smoothly managed.

In response to the (in his view) pejorative connotation of the term falsetto, Giles refuses to use it, calling the upper register "head voice". Many voice experts would disagree with this choice of terminology, reserving the designation "head voice" for the high damped register accompanied by a relatively low larynx that is typical of modern high operatic tenor voice production. The latter type of head voice is, in terms of the vocal cord vibration, actually more similar to "chest voice" than to falsetto, since it uses the same "speaking voice" production (referred to as "modal" by voice scientists), and this is reflected in the timbre.

== Roles in opera and oratorio ==
Notable countertenor roles include:

- Adone, La catena d'Adone (Domenico Mazzocchi)
- Atlante, Alceste, Il palazzo incantato (Luigi Rossi)
- Joad, Athalia (Handel)
- La Fortuna, Giustino, (Handel)
- Childerico, Faramondo, (Handel)
- David, Saul (Handel)
- Athamas, Semele (Handel)
- Joseph, Joseph and his Brethren (Handel)
- Hamor, Jephtha (Handel)
- Oberon, A Midsummer Night's Dream (Britten)
- David, Chichester Psalms (Bernstein)
- Priest, Taverner (Davies)
- Voice of Apollo, Death in Venice (Britten)
- Death, Ithuriel, Raphael, Paradise Lost (Penderecki)
- Prince Go-Go, Le Grand Macabre (Ligeti)
- Edgar, Lear (Reimann)
- Akhnaten, Akhnaten (Glass)
- Military Governor, A Night at the Chinese Opera (Weir)
- Mephistophiles, Historia von D. Johann Fausten (Schnittke)
- Vera Loman, Vera of Las Vegas (Hagen)
- The Refugee, Flight (Dove)
- The Guest, The voice behind the scene, Luci mie traditrici (Sciarrino)
- Kreon, Freispruch für Medea (Liebermann)
- Franz, Fritz, Doctor Ox's Experiment (Bryars)
- Raphael, Tobias and the Angel (Dove)
- Adschib ("the Wayward"), L'Upupa und der Triumph der Sohnesliebe (Henze)
- Trinculo, The Tempest (Adès)
- Artemis (travesti role), Phaedra (Henze)
- Fox/Coachman, The Adventures of Pinocchio (Dove)
- Herald, Medea (Reimann)
- Prospero, Ferdinand, The Enchanted Island (Pasticcio)
- First Angel/Boy, Written on Skin (Benjamin)
- Bishop Baldwin, Gawain (Birtwistle)
- Orpheus, The Second Mrs Kong (Birtwistle)
- Snake Priestess and 2 Innocents, The Minotaur (Birtwistle)
- Odysseus, Sirenen (Riehm)
- Terry, Marnie (Nico Muhly)

== See also ==
- Fach, the German system for classifying voices
- Voice classification in non-classical music
