= Westminster Abbey Choir School =

Location
- 20 Dean's Yard; London, SW1P 3NY; England
- 51.4986°N 0.1293°W

Information
- Type: Private boarding prep school Choral foundation school Cathedral school
- Religious affiliation: Church of England
- Established: c.1560 1848; 178 years ago
- Local authority: Westminster
- Department for Education URN: 101159 Tables
- Chairman of Governors: David Hoyle, Dean of Westminster
- Headteacher: Dr Emma Margrett
- Gender: Boys
- Age: 8 to 13
- Enrolment: 30 (2015)
- Houses: Blow, Purcell and Gibbons
- Website: www.westminster-abbey.org/choir-school

Westminster Abbey Choir School is a boarding preparatory school for boys in Westminster, and the only remaining choir school in the United Kingdom which exclusively educates choristers (i.e. only choirboys attend the school). It is located in Dean's Yard, by Westminster Abbey. It educates about 30 boys, aged 8–13 who sing in the Choir of Westminster Abbey, which takes part in state and national occasions as well as singing evensong every day (except Wednesday) and gives concert performances worldwide. Recent tours include to America, Hungary and Moscow. Other tours have included Australia, America and Hong Kong. The school is one of only three choir schools that educate only the male trebles of the choir, the others being Saint Thomas Choir School in New York City and Escolania de Montserrat in Spain. The headteacher is Dr Emma Margrett who became the first female headteacher of Westminster Abbey Choir School on 1 January 2024. The organist and master of the choristers is Andrew Nethsingha, former Director of Music at St John’s College Cambridge.

== History ==
The school is believed to have been founded around 1560, as the choir boys of Westminster Abbey have been educated there since Elizabethan times. The present school was built in 1915 (2015 being its centenary year) and underwent renovations in 1990s.

The three houses of the Choir School are named after the musicians John Blow, Henry Purcell and Orlando Gibbons, who were all Organists of Westminster Abbey.

== Governors ==
The Chairman of the Governors of the school is David Hoyle, the Dean of Westminster.

== Inspections ==
The school was inspected by the Independent Schools Inspectorate in February 2023.

== Curriculum ==
As a choir school, boys are selected by musical ability. The Dean and Chapter meet the cost of their vocal training and at least eighty per cent of the cost of their education. The regular school curriculum is not neglected and pupils are taught the required National Curriculum subjects as well as Latin, French and Greek.

== The choir ==
The choir makes frequent broadcasts and recordings. The choir's most recent recording is a CD of Hubert Parry's Songs of Farewell, which is on Hyperion Records.

=== Tours ===
The choir has travelled across the world to perform tours, most recently in Australia, the United States, China, Moscow, Rome, and Hungary. Generally these tours take place once every two years although this was disrupted during Covid.

== Notable former pupils ==
- Christopher Brown, composer
- Tim Brown, choral director
- James Burton, conductor
- Alan Civil, French horn orchestral player
- Gabriel Crouch, baritone, choral conductor
- Adrian Cruft, composer
- Brian Easdale, composer
- Clive Farahar, antiquarian book dealer
- Neil Jenkins, tenor
- William Wallace, Baron Wallace of Saltaire, academic
- James Wilkinson, author and former BBC science correspondent
- David Willcocks, conductor, organist and composer
- Guy Woolfenden, composer

== Notable staff ==
In the 1950s, the celebrated singer John Whitworth taught maths at the school.

== See also ==
- Westminster Abbey
