= 11 High Street, Llandaff =

11 High Street, Llandaff Mrs Pratchett's sweet shop
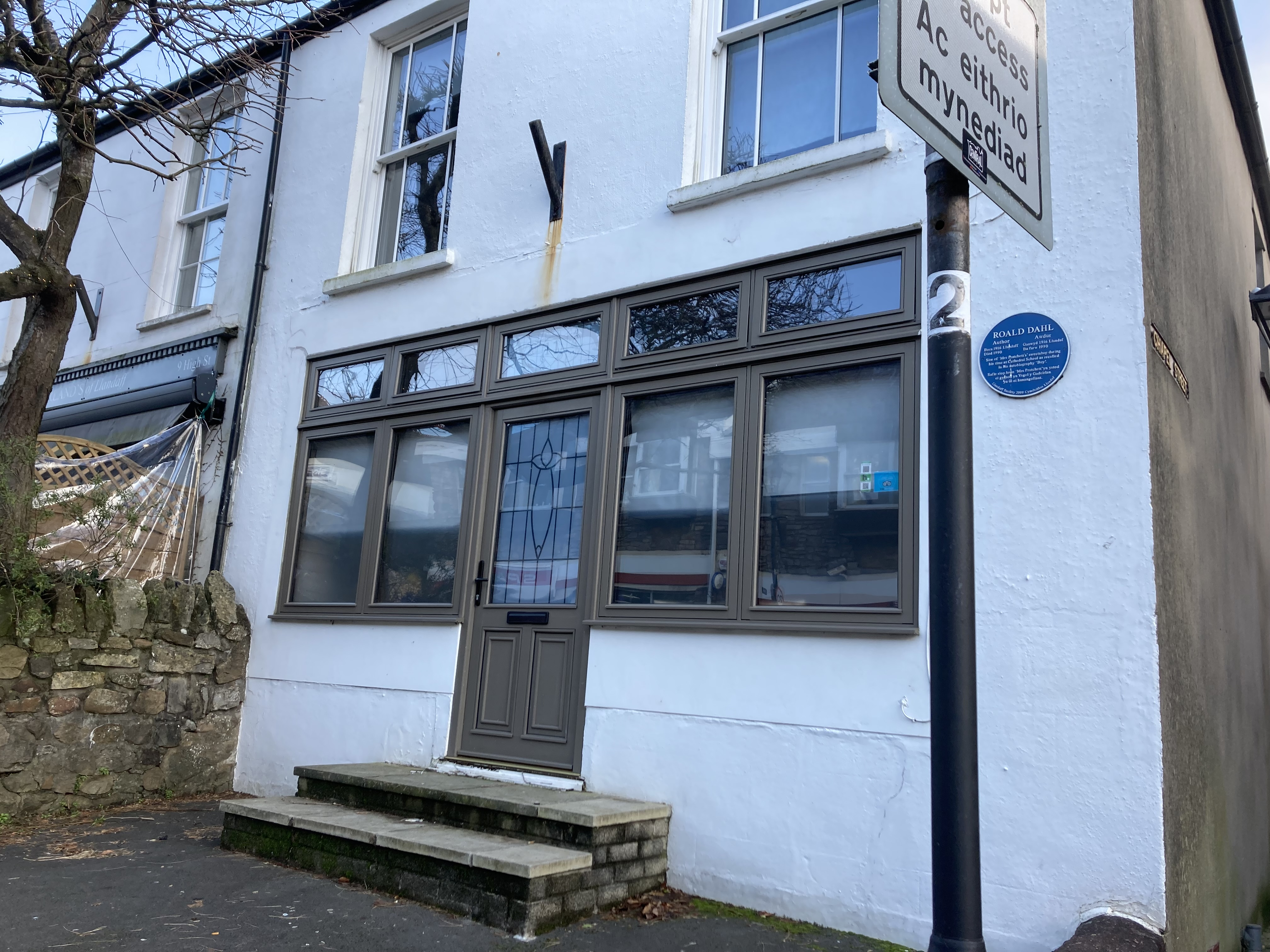
- 11 High Street in 2023
- Interactive map of the 11 High Street, Llandaff; Mrs Pratchett's sweet shop area
- Former names: Catherine Morgan Confectioner and Tobacconist; The Great Wall

General information
- Location: Llandaff, Cardiff, Wales
- Coordinates: 51.49403°N 3.21873°W
- Owner: Han Lau

11 High Street, also known as Mrs Pratchett's sweet shop, is a two-storey residential building in Llandaff, Cardiff, Wales. It was Catherine Morgan's Confectioner and Tobacconist shop in the early 20th century. It was converted into a Chinese restaurant known as The Great Wall around 2009. It is currently in use as a self-catering holiday let. The building is not a listed building, unlike others in High Street, such as St Andrew, St Cross, 6 High Street and 19 High Street.

The building is best known for where The Great Mouse Plot of 1924 occurred, where Roald Dahl and four other school-boys played a prank on the sweet shop owner, by putting a dead mouse in a gobstopper jar. At the time of the prank the shop was owned by Catherine Morgan, although in his book Boy: Tales of Childhood her pseudonym is Mrs Pratchett, and the shop was "Mrs Pratchett's sweet shop". The sweet shop inspired Dahl's stories such as Charlie and the Chocolate Factory, The Twits and Matilda. In September 2009, the building received a blue plaque, which was unveiled by Dahl's widow, Felicity, and his son Theo.

== History ==
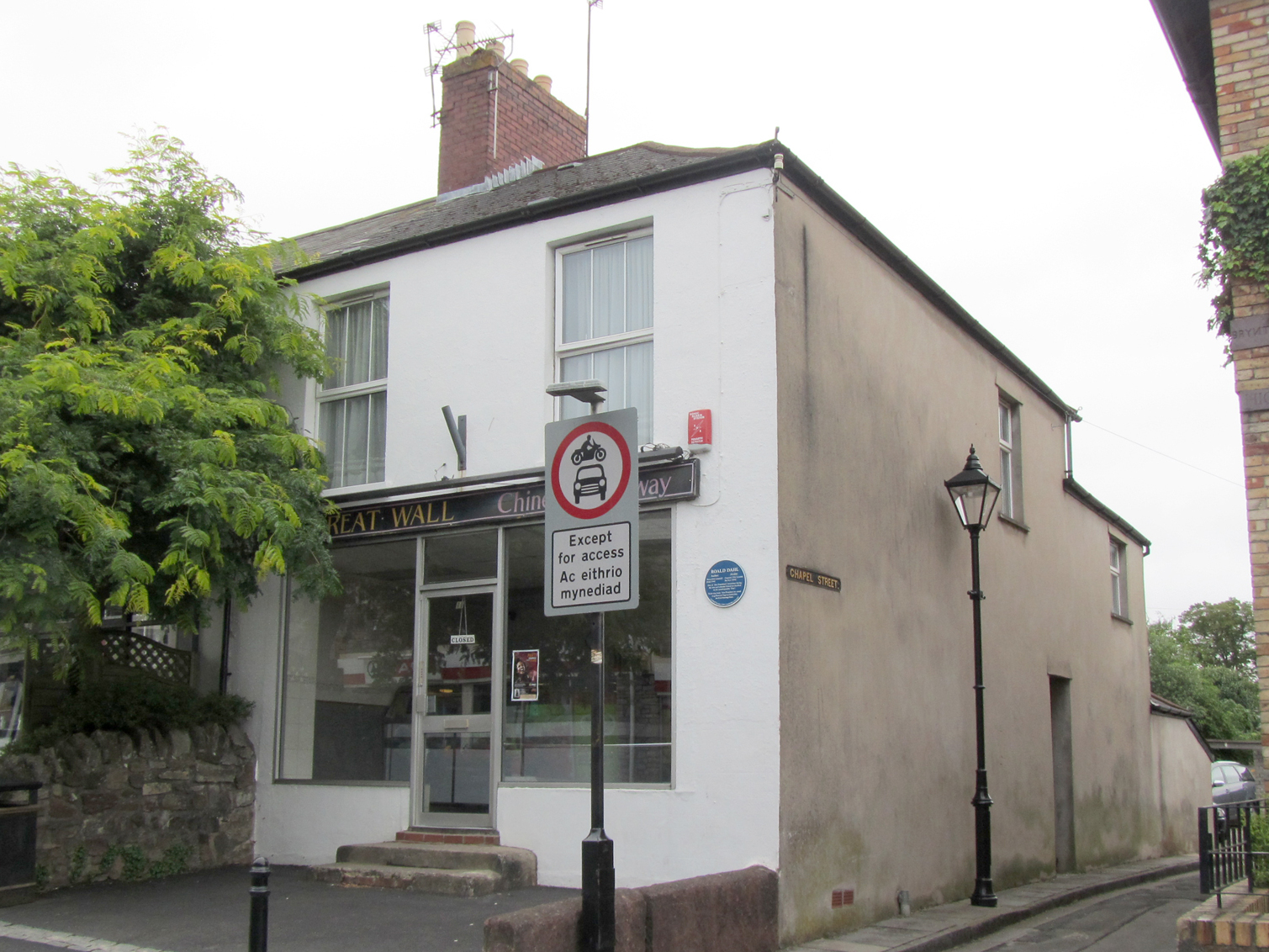
11 High Street, when it was known as The Great Wall Chinese Takeaway in 2012

In the early 20th century, High Street was a dirt road, with dilapidated thatched cottages on one side of the street and hoardings on the other. 11 High Street is thought by Airbnb to have been built in the 19th century. Around 1900, Catherine Morgan established a sweet shop on the ground floor, known as Catherine Morgan Confectioner and Tobacconist. Morgan ran the shop for 37 years along with her two elderly spinster daughters Kate and Sarah. In 1939 she died, aged 84, in the flat above the sweet shop, where she had lived for 64 years. The old sweet shop is now better known as Mrs Pratchett's sweet shop.

Roald Dahl and his friends used to call at Mrs Pratchett's Sweet Shop fascinated by the delights in there. They would spend their pocket money and were in awe of the revolting woman that was Mrs Pratchett. But, of course, Mrs Pratchett wasn't her real name. Her real name, we believe, was Katy Morgan. Mrs Morgan ran it with her daughters, who were elderly spinsters. They lived in reduced circumstances - running a little sweet shop was a means of bringing some money in. Geoffrey Barton-Greenwood—chair of the Llandaff Society

The sweet shop is where the young Roald Dahl would buy sweets on his way to and from Llandaff Cathedral School where he attended from 1923 to 1925. It provided Dahl with inspiration for some of his books including Charlie and the Chocolate Factory, The Twits and Matilda.

The owner of the building is now Mrs Han Lau, who had turned it into a Chinese restaurant called The Great Wall around 2009. Mrs Lau then converted it into a self-catering holiday let in 2017.

== The Great Mouse Plot of 1924 ==
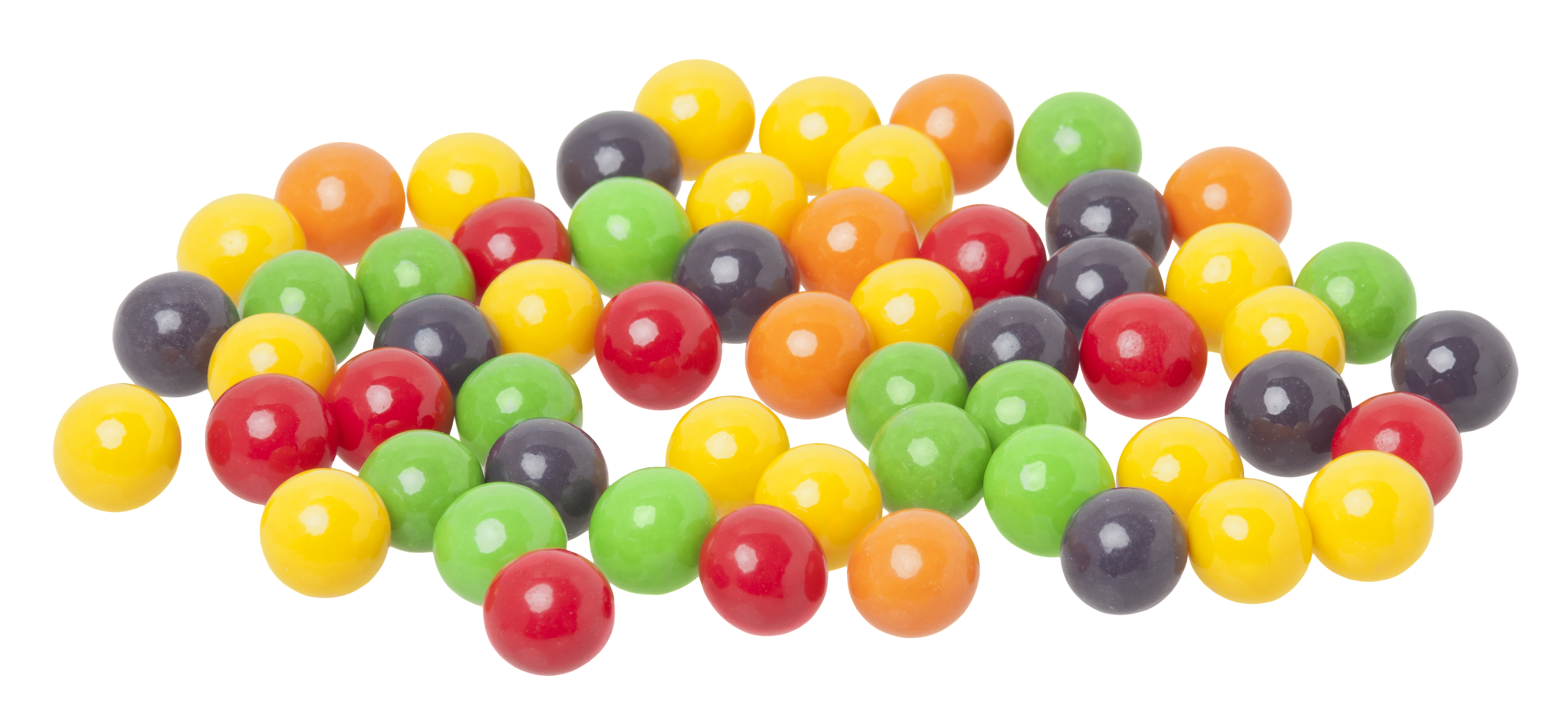
Gobstoppers

Dahl would often visit the sweet shop at 11 High Street, where he would spend his pocket money on gobstoppers, toffees and other sweets. In his 1984 autobiography, Boy: Tales of Childhood, and his book The Great Mouse Plot, Dahl describes the shop as "the very centre of our lives. To us, it was what a bar is to a drunk, or a church to a Bishop".

Dahl wrote in Boy: Tales of Childhood that the owner of the sweet shop was "a mean and loathsome old woman named Mrs Pratchett" (a pseudonym for Catherine Morgan). Dahl wrote: "By far the most loathsome thing about Mrs Pratchett was the filth that clung around her. Her apron was grey and greasy. Her blouse had bits of breakfast all over it, toast-crumbs and tea stains and splotches of dried egg-yolk." As a seven-year-old, Dahl, along with four other boys, decided to put a dead mouse in a gobstopper jar to terrify "Mrs Pratchett". The next morning the boys walked past the sweet shop only to find it closed, with the gobstopper jar smashed over the floor. The prank worked, but she had her revenge when she told their school's headmaster of what they had done and they were swiftly caned. The incident is cited as an inspiration for Dahl's stories such as Charlie and the Chocolate Factory, The Twits and Matilda.

== The Roald Dahl blue plaque ==
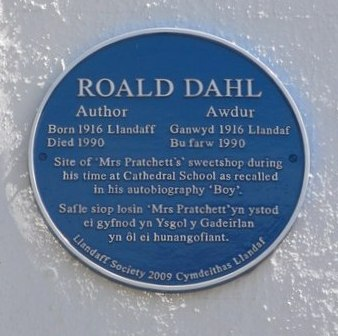
The blue plaque states it was the site of "Mrs Pratchett's sweet shop"

It had not been clear where 'Mrs Pratchett's sweet shop was located. The Llandaff Society had thought it could have been 11 High Street, 38 Bridge Street, 2 High Street, a site on Cardiff Road, 48 High Street, or the HSBC bank on Cardiff Road where Dahl spent his pocket money on sweets. It took a visit from Lissy, Dahl's second wife, to determine the exact location of the sweet shop. The blue plaque was the first publicly-viewable commemorative plaque to recognise Dahl's life in Llandaff.

The plaque was unveiled by Dahl's son Theo, on the afternoon of Monday 14 September 2009. Children from local schools were also invited to the ceremony. The sweet shop was located just a short distance from Llandaff Cathedral School, where Dahl attended between 1923 and 1925.
