= 19 High Street, Llandaff =

19 High Street
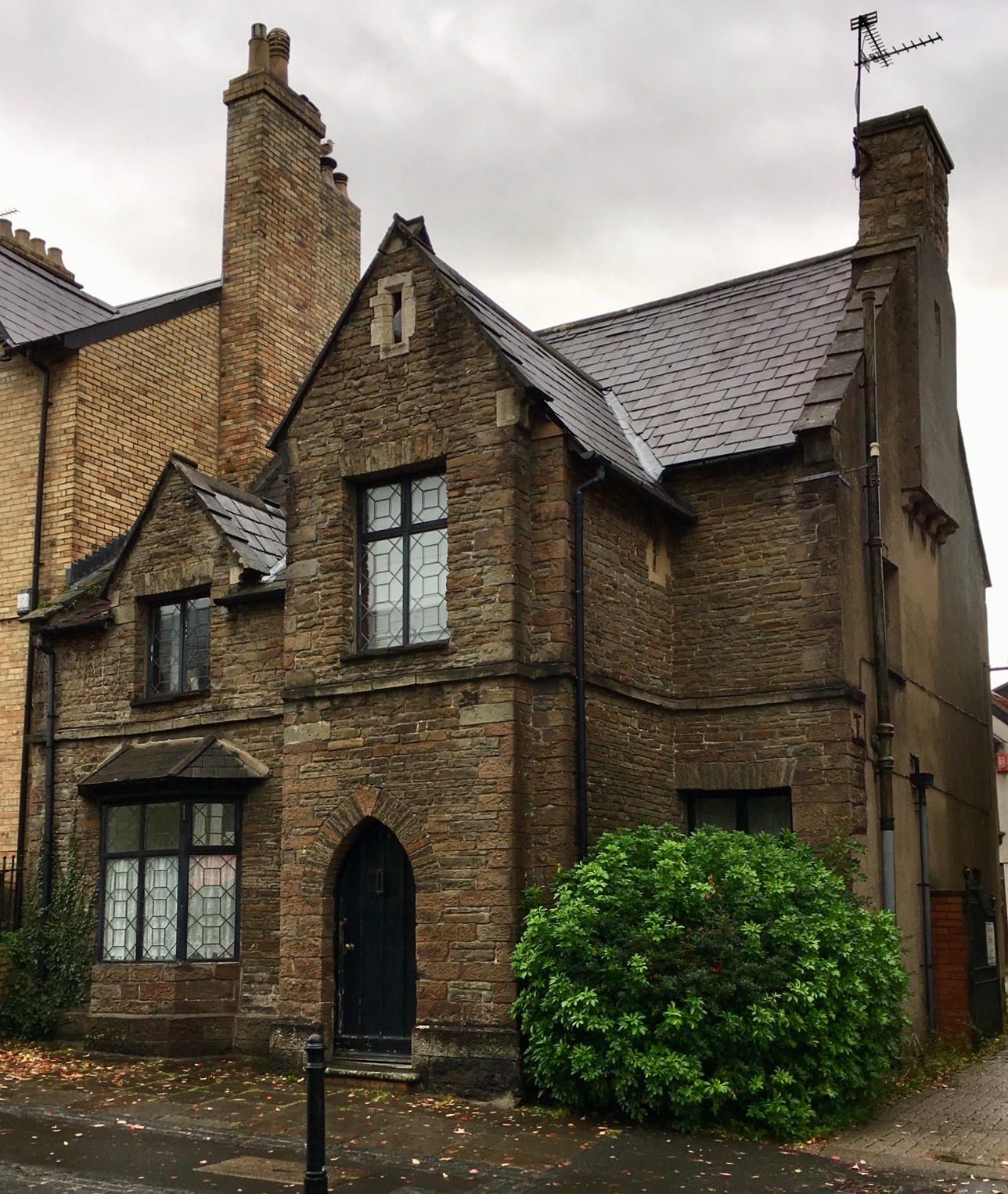
- 19 High Street

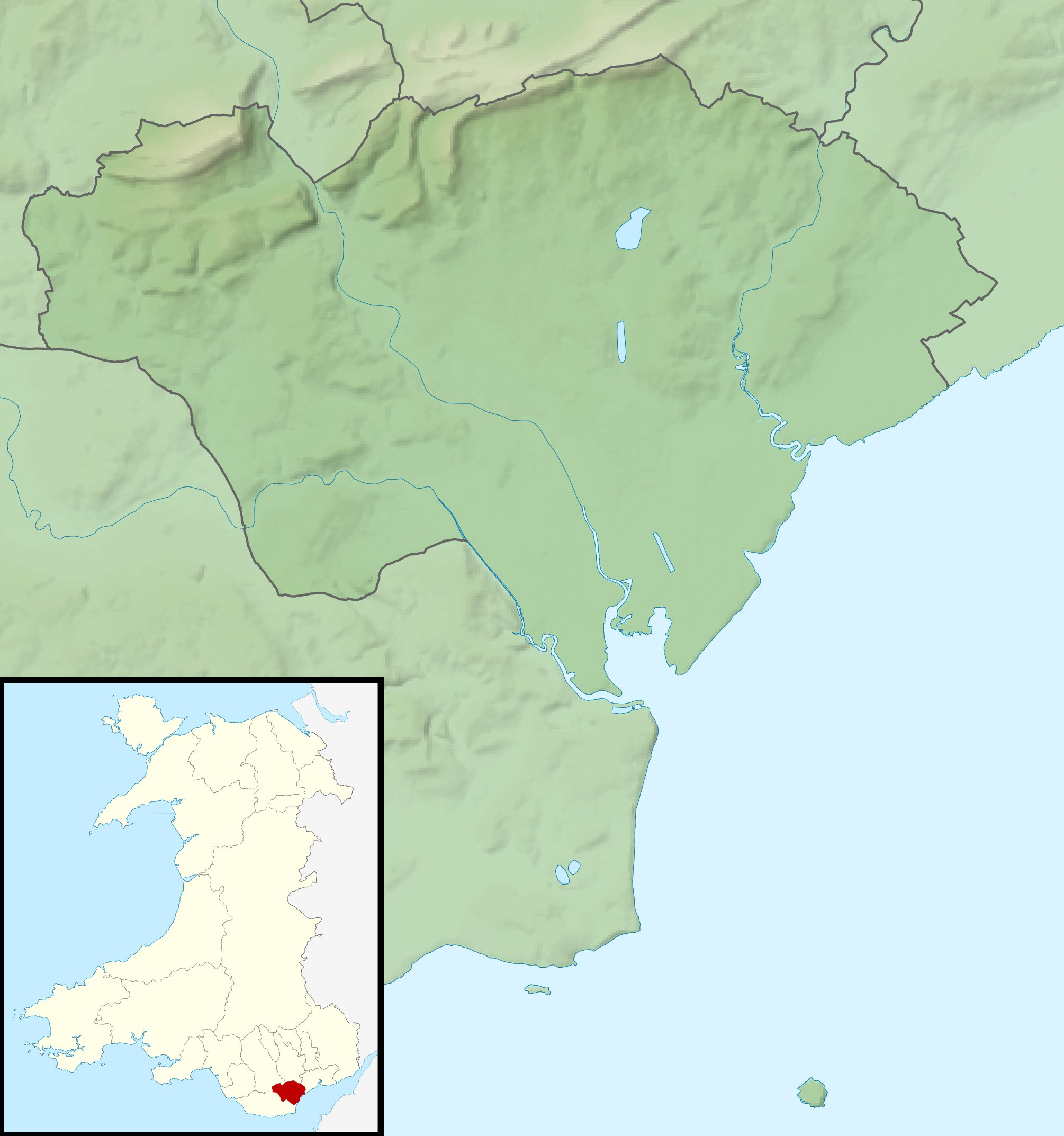
- Location in Cardiff and Wales
- 51.49383°N 3.2189°W
- Type: Private residential house
- Location: Cardiff

Site notes
- Area: Llandaff
- Architectural style: 17th century style

Listed Building – Grade II
- Official name: 19 High Street, Llandaff
- Designated: 19 May 1975; 51 years ago
- Reference no.: 13732

19 High Street is a small mid-19th-century residential domestic building in Llandaff, Cardiff, Wales. The building is a two-storey Grade II listed structure and it was listed because it is "Included for its group value with the other listed buildings around The Cathedral Green and on the High Street".

== History ==
Cadw believe that the small house was probably built in the mid-19th century in the 17th century style. The house is built of roughly coursed multi-coloured Radyr stone with some cut stones. Other buildings in High Street include St Andrew, St Cross, 2-4 High Street and 6 High Street that are also Grade II listed.
