= 2–4 High Street, Llandaff =

2–4 High Street
- Summer Palace
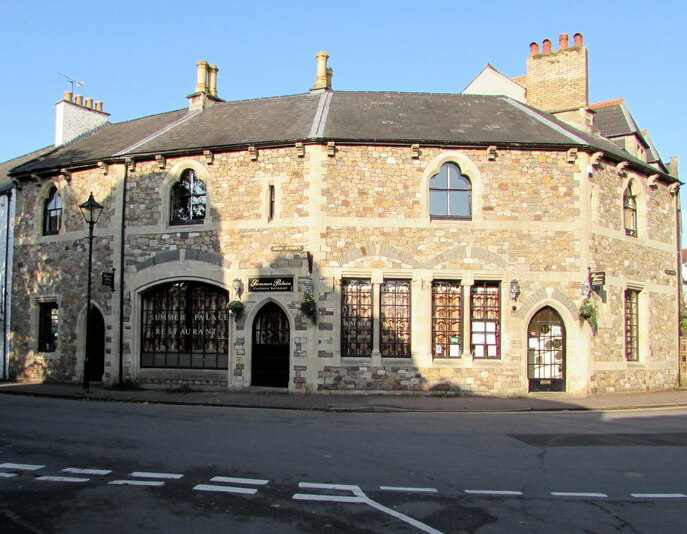
- 4 High Street (left) and 2 High Street (right)

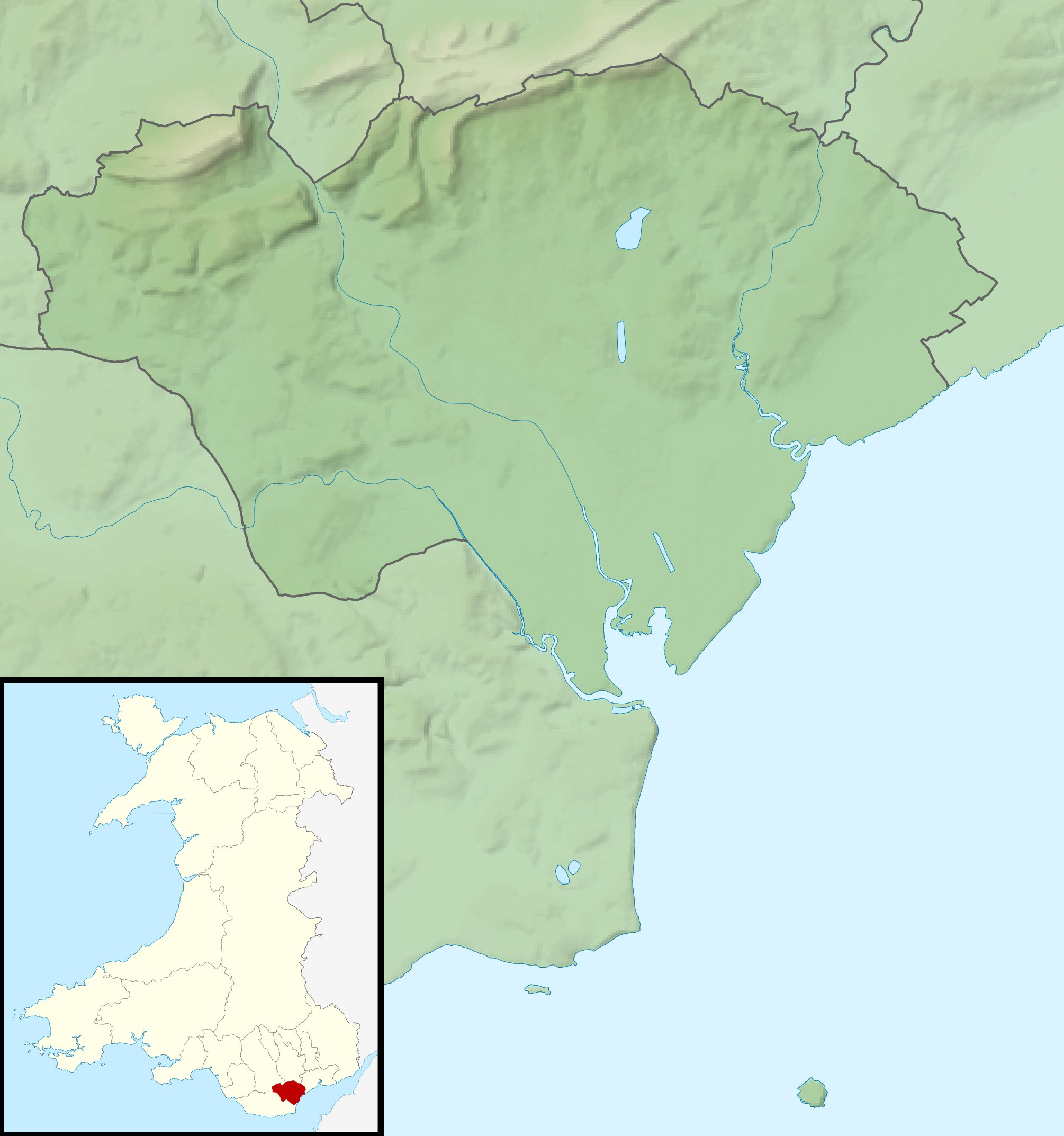
- Location in Cardiff and Wales
- 51.49473°N 3.21828°W
- Type: Chinese restaurant
- Location: Cardiff

Site notes
- Area: Llandaff

Listed Building – Grade II
- Official name: Nos.2 & 4 High Street, Llandaff, South Glamorgan
- Designated: 19 May 1975; 51 years ago
- Reference no.: 13733

2–4 High Street is a commercial property currently used as a Chinese restaurant in Llandaff, Cardiff, Wales. The building is a two-storey Grade II listed structure and it was listed because it is "Included as a possible design by John Prichard and for its group value with the other listed buildings around The Cathedral Green and on the High Street". It was built of polychromatic stone and Bath stone.

== History ==
Cadw believes that both properties (2 and 4 High Street) were probably designed by John Prichard and built around 1863 as a home and premises for Mr Seaborn, the butcher. It is built of polychromatic stone and Bath stone. 2–4 High Street is a Grade II listed structure. Other buildings in High Street include St Andrew, St Cross, 6 High Street and 19 High Street, all of which are also listed at Grade II.

The Chim family owns the property and has done so since 1988. It is today a Cantonese restaurant called Summer Palace.
