= Benne ball =

Trinidadian and Tobagonian dessert

Benne balls or sometimes spelled Bene balls are a dessert from Trinidad and Tobago, made of sesame seeds and some combination of molasses, sugar, or honey. Round in shape and covered in whole sesame seeds, benne balls have an extremely hard consistency that is compared to jawbreaker candy. Benne balls were invented by Afro-Trinidadian descendants of slaves, and the word "benne" is adopted from an African word for "sesame".
