= Boy (autobiography) =

1984 autobiography by Roald Dahl

Boy: Tales of Childhood
- First edition
- Author: Roald Dahl
- Illustrator: Quentin Blake
- Language: English
- Genre: Autobiography
- Publisher: Jonathan Cape (UK)
- Publication date: 1984
- Publication place: United Kingdom
- Pages: 176
- ISBN: 978-0-224-02985-8
- Followed by: Going Solo

Boy: Tales of Childhood is an autobiography written by British writer Roald Dahl. This book describes his life from early childhood until leaving school, focusing on living conditions in Britain in the 1920s and 1930s, the public school system at the time, and how his childhood experiences led him to writing children's books as a career. It concludes with his first job, working for Royal Dutch Shell. His life story continues in the book Going Solo.

An expanded edition titled More About Boy was published in 2008, featuring the full original text and illustrations with annotations by Dahl's widow Felicity along with additional stories, letters, and photographs.

== Plot summary ==
=== Dahl's ancestry ===
Roald Dahl's father Harald Dahl and mother Sofie Hesselberg were Norwegians who emigrated to Wales before World War I, and settled in Cardiff.

Harald and his brother Oscar, who were born in the 1860s, split up and went their separate ways after deciding that a better future lay before them outside their native Norway. Oscar headed to La Rochelle, France.

Harald had suffered an unfortunate accident as a teenager in the late 1870s, breaking his left arm by fixing the ceiling tiles of the family home and then falling off the ladder. A doctor was summoned, but was drunk on arrival and mistook the fractured arm for a dislocated shoulder. The doctor's attempt to relocate the shoulder failed, causing Harald to scream in agony. Harald's mother was a visitor at Harald's hospital room and viewed the scene in shock. By the time she told the doctors to stop, Harald's arm was very damaged. The doctors realised they had made a mistake, and the only way to not keep him in that condition was to amputate his left arm. Harald lived with one arm for the rest of his life, but he did not let the lack of a second arm hinder him; even fashioning a special sharpened fork to aid in eating, his only serious limitation being his inability to cut the top off a boiled egg.

Harald Dahl had two children by his first wife, Marie, who died shortly after the birth of their second child. He then married Sofie Magdalene Hesselberg, Roald's mother. Harald was more than 20 years older than Sofie; he was born in 1863 and she was born in 1885. By the time Roald Dahl was born in 1916, his father was 53 years old.

=== Family tragedy ===
In 1920, when Roald Dahl was only three years old, his seven-year-old sister Astri died from complications from appendicitis. Only weeks later, Roald's father died of pneumonia aged 57, shortly before the birth of Dahl’s youngest sister. As the book's narrator, Dahl suggests his father died of grief from losing his daughter. Roald's widowed mother was faced with the choice of moving the family back to Norway to be near her family or relocating to a smaller house in Wales to continue the children's education in the United Kingdom. She soon came to the decision to remain in South Wales, as she was determined that her children should be educated in English schools, as their father had always stated that English schools were the best in the world.

=== Primary school ===
Roald Dahl started at the Elm Tree House Primary School in Cardiff in 1921, when he was five years old. He was there for a year, but had few memories of his time there.

=== Sweets ===
Roald writes about different confectionery, his love of sweets, his fascination with the local sweet shop (11 High Street, Llandaff), and in particular, about the free samples of Cadbury chocolate bars given to him and his schoolmates much later when he was a pupil at Repton School. Young Dahl dreamt of working as an inventor for Cadbury, an idea he said later inspired Charlie and the Chocolate Factory, eventually published in the early 1960s. Some of the sweets he enjoyed as a child were lemon sherbets, pear drops, and liquorice boot laces.

=== Great mouse plot of 1924 ===
From the age of eight, Dahl attended Llandaff Cathedral School in Cardiff. He and his friends thoroughly disliked the local sweet-shop owner, Mrs Pratchett, an unpleasant, elderly woman who gave no thought to hygiene (and described by Dahl's biographer, Donald Sturrock, as "a comic distillation of the two witchlike sisters who, it seems, ran the shop in real life"). They played a prank on her by placing a dead mouse in a gobstopper jar while his friend Thwaites distracted her by buying sweets. They were caned by the headmaster as a punishment, after Mrs Pratchett identified Dahl and his friends as the pupils who were responsible for the mouse in the jar.

Mrs Pratchett, who sat in the headmaster's office to watch the canings, was not satisfied after the first stroke was delivered and insisted the headmaster should cane much harder, which he did: four of the hardest strokes he could muster while Mrs Pratchett beamed with great delight as each boy suffered his punishment. Dahl’s mother was outraged when she discovered that her son had been caned, and went to confront the school’s headmaster, who advised her to transfer Roald to another school if she disapproved of his methods.

=== St Peter's School ===
From the age of nine, Dahl attended St Peter's School, a boarding school in Weston-super-Mare, where he would remain for four years. Among many other tales, he describes having received six strokes of the cane after being accused of cheating. In the essay "The Life Story of a Penny", he claims that he still has the essay nearly 60 years on, and that he had been doing well until the nib of his pen broke — fountain pens were not permitted at the school. He whispered to his friend in hope of obtaining a spare nib, when the master, Captain Hardcastle, heard him and accused him of cheating, issuing him with a "stripe", meaning that the next morning he received six strokes of the cane from the headmaster, who refused to believe Dahl's version of events on the basis of Captain Hardcastle's status. Captain "Hardcastle" was later in fact revealed to be Captain Stephen Lancaster (1894–1971), a Great War veteran who was still teaching at the school in the early 1960s, and was also remembered by future notable pupils including John Cleese and Charles Higham.

Many of the events he recalls from the school involved the matron. She once sprinkled soap shavings into the mouth of a pupil called Tweedie, to stop him from snoring. She also sent an eight-year-old boy, who had allegedly thrown a sponge across the dormitory, to the headmaster. Still in his pyjamas and dressing gown, the little boy then received six strokes of the cane. Wragg, another boy in Dahl's dormitory, sprinkled sugar over the corridor floor so they could hear that the matron was coming when she walked upon it. When the boy's friends refused to turn him in, the whole school was punished by the headmaster, who for the remainder of the term confiscated the keys to their tuck boxes containing food parcels which the pupils had received from their families. In the end, he returns home to his family for Christmas.

=== Repton and Shell ===
As Dahl came to the end of his time at St Peter's, Roald's mother entered him for either Marlborough or Repton, but he chose Repton because it was easier to pronounce. Dahl soon realized that Marlborough may have been a better choice, as life at Repton was difficult and cruel. The prefects, named Boazers as per school tradition, were utmost sadists and patrolled the school like secret police, and also had the power to cane younger pupils.

The headmaster treated students similarly, and Dahl describes an occasion when his friend received several brutal strokes of the cane from the headmaster as punishment for misbehaviour. According to Dahl, this headmaster was Geoffrey Francis Fisher, who later became Archbishop of Canterbury and Bishop of London in 1939. However, according to Dahl's biographer, Jeremy Treglown, Dahl's memory was in error: the beating took place in May 1933, a year after Fisher had left Repton. The headmaster concerned was in fact John Traill Christie, Fisher's successor.

Despite his difficulties at school, Dahl did make friends with the Maths professor and a pupil called Michael. Even one of the Boazers, Wilberforce, took a liking to Dahl. Despite it being punishment for Dahl's tardiness, Wilberforce was so impressed by how Dahl warmed his lavatory seat that he hired him as his personal lavatory warmer. Dahl also excelled in sports and photography, something he says impressed various masters at the school.

Towards the end of his time, Dahl purchased a motorbike for £18 and stored it in a local garage, often riding it around the streets of Repton and the Derbyshire countryside, and would pass the school's masters and Boazers on their lunch breaks, without them knowing who he was.

On leaving school in 1934, Dahl declined the opportunity to apply for university and instead secured a position working for Shell, despite the headmaster trying to dissuade him because of his lack of responsibility. Dahl was nonetheless entered into the business and toured Britain in the job. He became a businessman in London and was content. However, he took a trip across Newfoundland with some other boys and a man who had travelled to Antarctica with Scott; Dahl describes Newfoundland as "not much of a country". He was then assigned to go to Africa, but declined Egypt because it was "too dusty". The manager instead selected Dahl for East Africa, delighting him. The book ends with Dahl setting off to Africa, unknowing of the ascension of Adolf Hitler as chancellor of Germany, a man who would soon split the world in two, sparking a Second World War in which Dahl would ultimately fight and suffer a near-fatal accident which left him in hospital for six months. He would later document these adventures in more detail in Going Solo.

== Sources ==
- Sturrock, Donald (2010). Storyteller: The Authorized Biography of Roald Dahl. New York: Simon & Schuster. ISBN 978-1-4165-5082-2.
- Treglown, Jeremy (1994). Roald Dahl: a Biography. London: Faber & Faber. ISBN 978-0-571-16573-5.
