= Gobstopper =

Type of hard candy

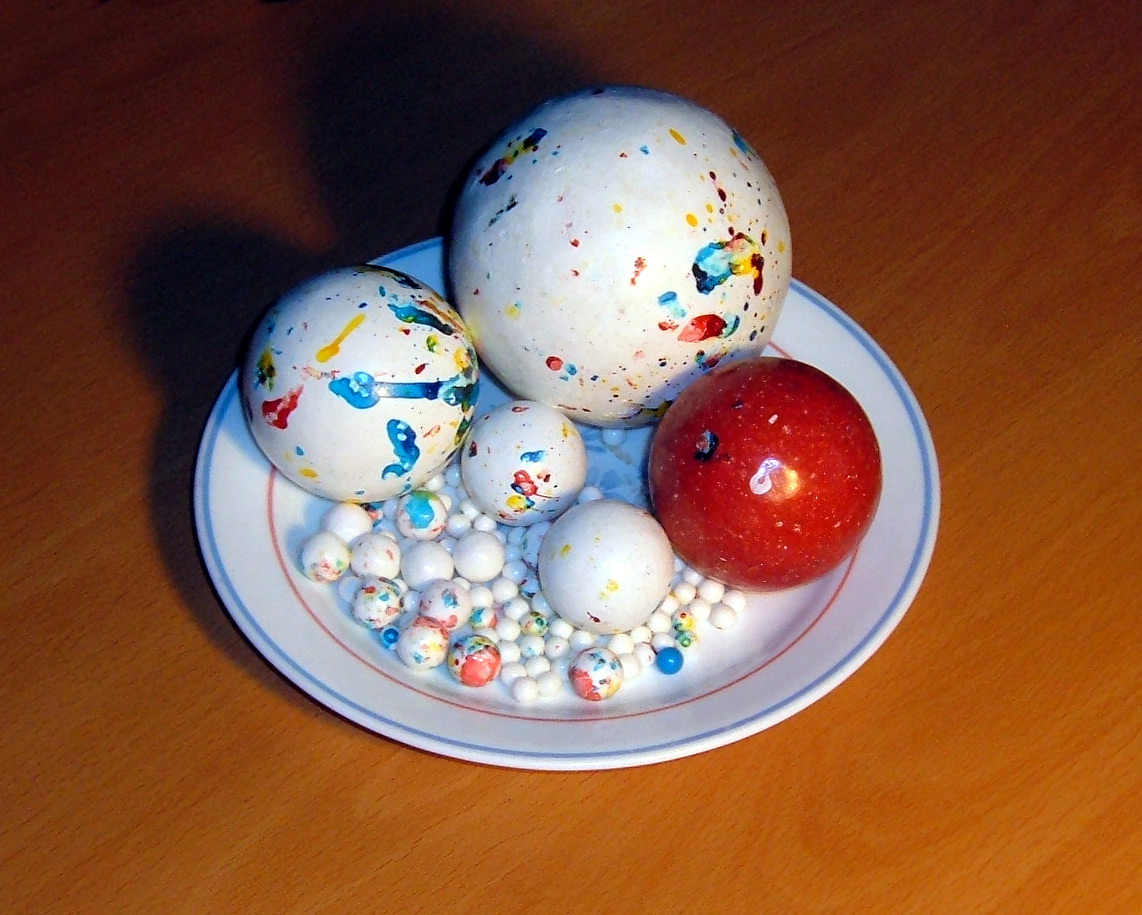
- Gobstoppers of various sizes and colors. The largest one is 3 inches (~7.5 cm) in diameter
- Alternative names: Jawbreaker, jawbuster
- Type: Confectionery
- Place of origin: United Kingdom
- Main ingredients: Sugar

A gobstopper, also known as a jawbreaker in Canada and the United States, is a type of boiled sweet. It is usually round and usually ranges from 1 to 3 cm (0.4 to 1.2 in) across, although gobstoppers billed as having a diameter as large as 3.25 in (83 mm) have been marketed.

The term "gobstopper" derives from "gob", which is slang in the United Kingdom and Ireland for mouth. The sweet was a favourite among British schoolboys in the first half of the twentieth century; author Roald Dahl, who wrote about a jar of gobstoppers featuring in the prank he played in his local sweet shop in 1924, also referred to them in his fictional Everlasting Gobstopper, a candy in his 1964 children's novel Charlie and the Chocolate Factory.

Gobstoppers have been sold in traditional sweet shops for at least a century, often by weight from jars. As gobstoppers dissolve very slowly, they last a very long time in the mouth, which is a major factor in their popularity.

== Manufacturing ==
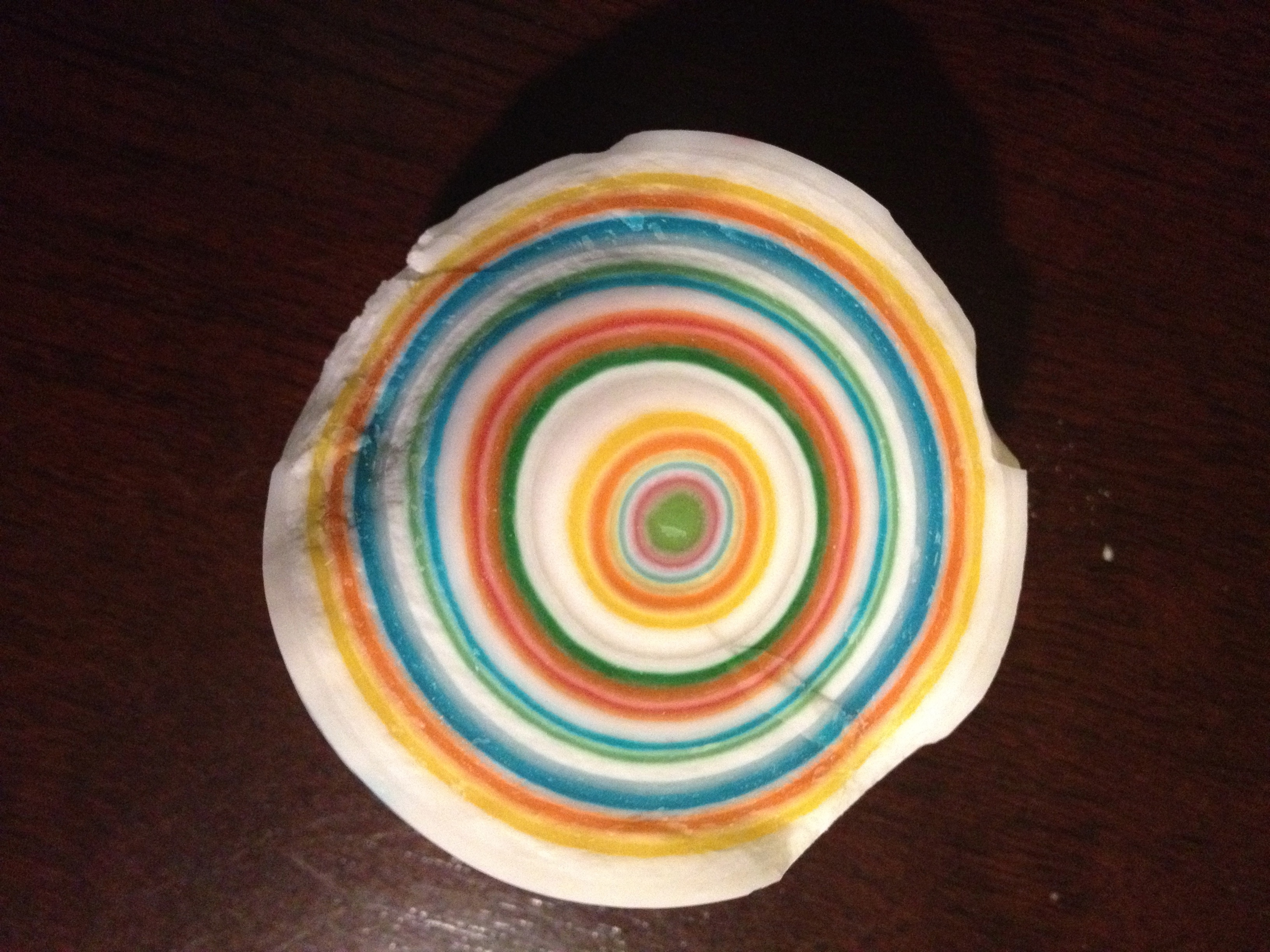
A cross section of a rainbow gobstopper with multicoloured sugar layers, allowing the gobstopper to change colour as it is gradually consumed

Gobstoppers are made by slowly depositing layers onto a core, such as a pressed ball of sugar, a single seed of anise or a gumball. Gobstoppers are made in large, rotating, heated pans in a process known as "hot panning". The sweets take several weeks to manufacture, as the process of adding liquid sugar is repeated multiple times. Natural and artificial colours and flavours are also added during the panning process.

== Everlasting Gobstoppers ==
The Everlasting Gobstoppers, sold under Nestlé's Willy Wonka Candy Company brand, were first introduced in 1976 by Breaker Confections and are named after the Everlasting Gobstoppers in Roald Dahl's children's book Charlie and the Chocolate Factory. In Dahl's story, Everlasting Gobstoppers last forever. Dahl named the sweet after gobstoppers, which were a favourite among British schoolboys between the two World Wars. A jar of gobstoppers featured in the prank Dahl played on the owner of his local sweet shop in 1924, which he recorded in his autobiography Boy: Tales of Childhood.

== In popular culture ==
=== Charlie and the Chocolate Factory ===
In the 1964 children's book Charlie and the Chocolate Factory, Roald Dahl described "Everlasting Gobstoppers," a fictional gobstopper that could never get smaller or be finished.

=== Ed, Edd n Eddy ===
The animated series Ed, Edd n Eddy revolves around jawbreakers. Most episodes feature the titular characters running a variety of scams to earn money to buy the confections. The jawbreakers themselves are depicted as comically oversized, often with a circumference larger than that of the heads of the characters; a character's cheeks would swell to the same size when the jawbreakers are placed in their mouths. Jawbreakers are also the main subject of one of the series' tie-in video games, Ed, Edd n Eddy: Jawbreakers!.

=== Jawbreaker ===
The 1999 American teen comedy Jawbreaker centers around the main characters accidentally killing their friend after gagging her with a jawbreaker.

== Burn risk ==
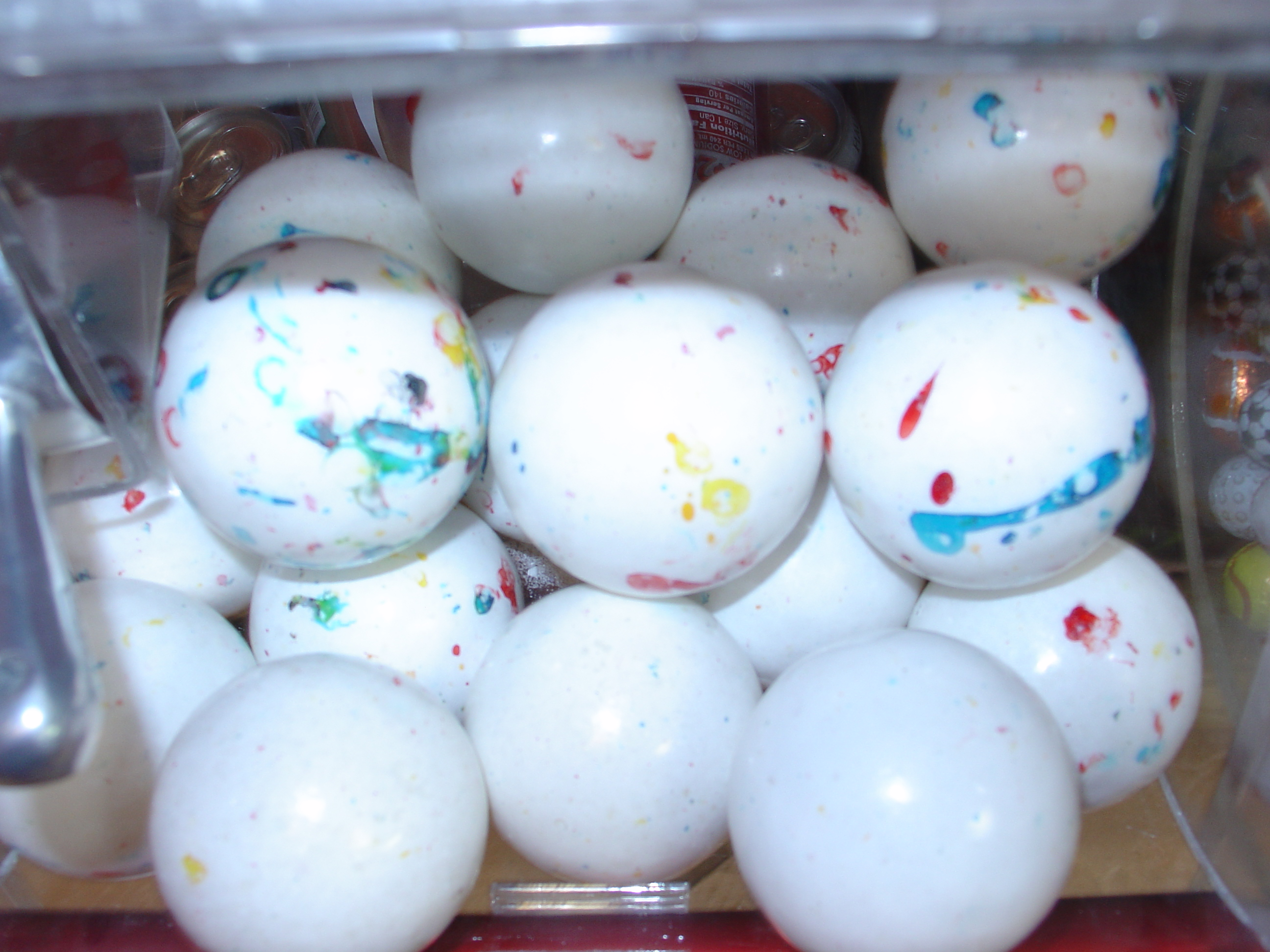
Large gobstoppers sold in a children's store

In 2003, Taquandra Diggs, a nine-year-old girl in Starke, Florida, US suffered severe burns, allegedly from biting on an exploding Wonka Everlasting Gobstopper that had been refrigerated, left out in the sun, then refrigerated again. Diggs and several other alleged victims' families filed lawsuits against Nestlé for medical bills resulting from plastic surgery as well as pain and suffering. This was later settled outside of court for an undisclosed amount.

== See also ==
- Everlasting Gobstopper
- Aniseed ball
- Atomic Fireball
- Benne ball
- Humbug
- Hard candy
