= St Cross, Llandaff =

House in Cardiff, Wales

St Cross
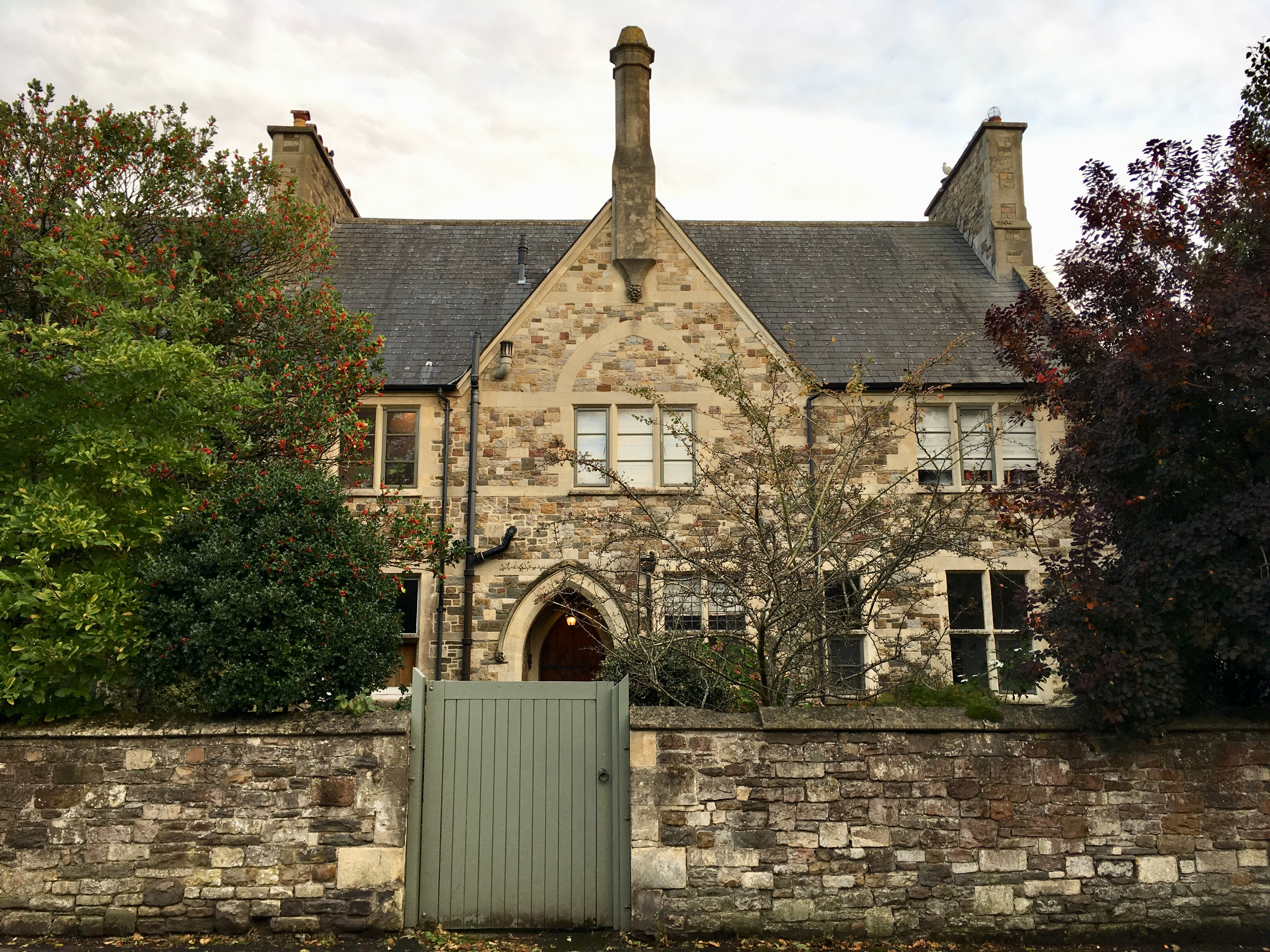
- St Cross

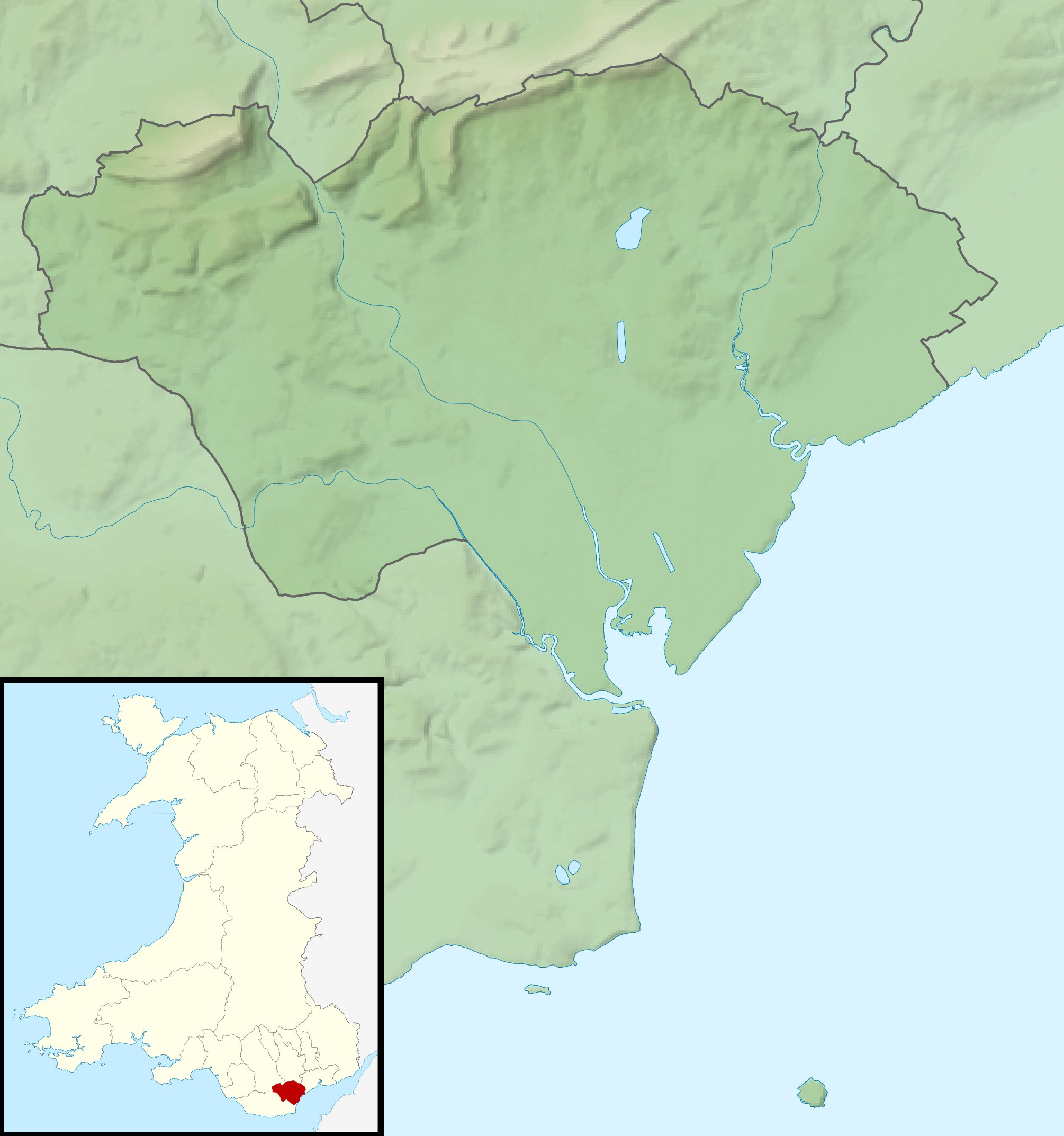
- Location in Cardiff and Wales
- 51.49426°N 3.21833°W
- Type: Private residential house
- Location: Cardiff

History
- Built: 1859-61

Site notes
- Area: Llandaff
- Architect: Ewan Christian
- Architectural style: Restrained Gothic style

Listed Building – Grade II
- Official name: St. Cross
- Designated: 19 May 1975; 51 years ago
- Reference no.: 81278

Listed Building – Grade II
- Official name: Garden Wall of St Cross
- Designated: 19 May 1975; 51 years ago
- Reference no.: 81268

St Cross is a 19th-century residential domestic building in Llandaff, Cardiff, Wales. The building is a two-storey Grade II listed structure and it was listed because it is "Included as an unaltered design by Ewan Christian and for its group value with the other listed buildings around The Cathedral Green and on the High Street". The garden wall of St Cross is also a Grade II structure.

== History ==
The building was built between 1859 and 1861 by Ewan Christian, who was the architect for the Ecclesiastical Commissioners. It is a right-hand house with its neighbour being St Andrew. Both semi-detached houses were built for minor canons of Llandaff Cathedral. It was built with multi-coloured stones, both square or rectangular in shape, and with Bath stone, ashlar dressings and Welsh slate roof.

== Garden wall of St Cross ==
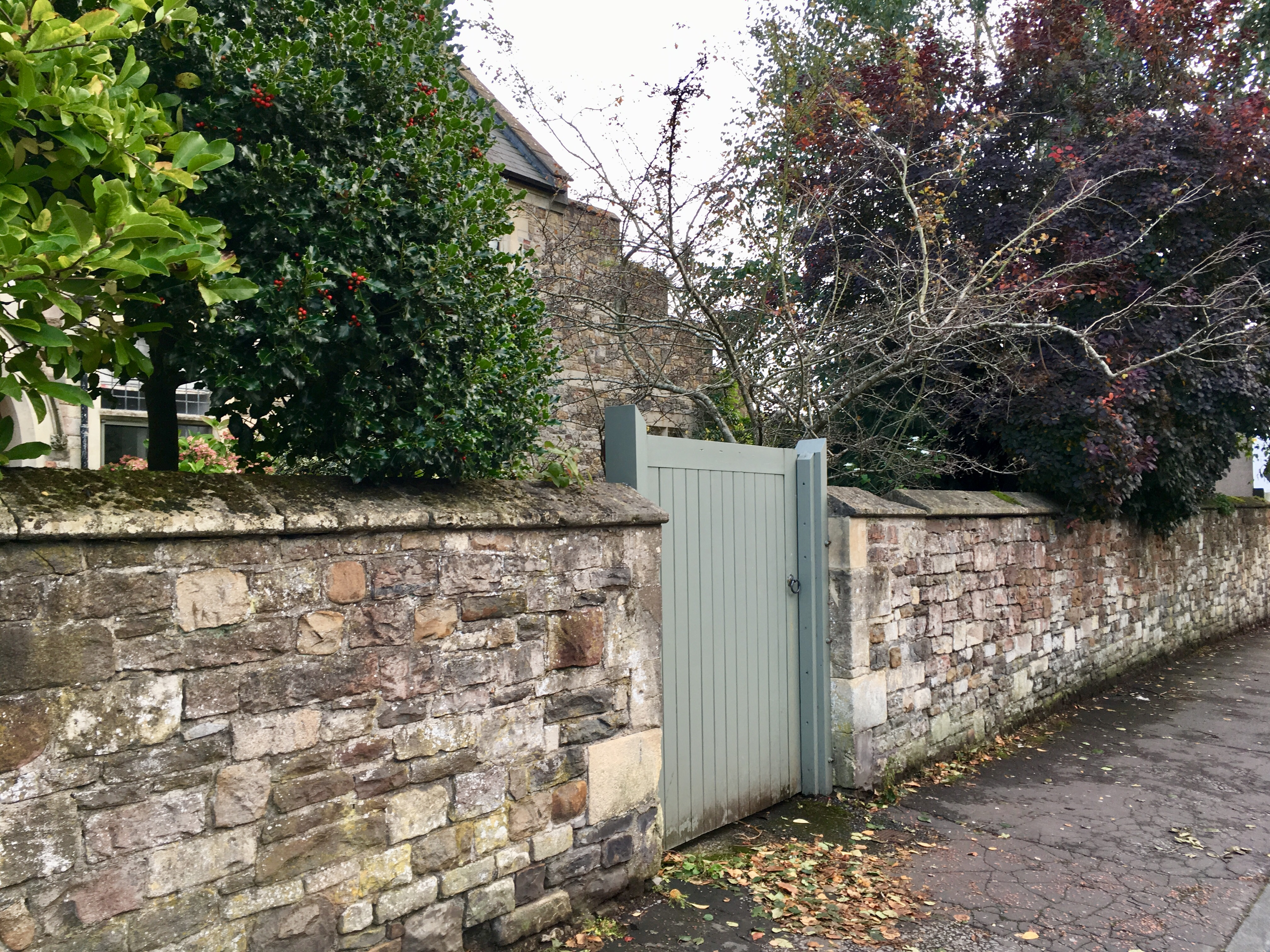
The front wall of St Cross

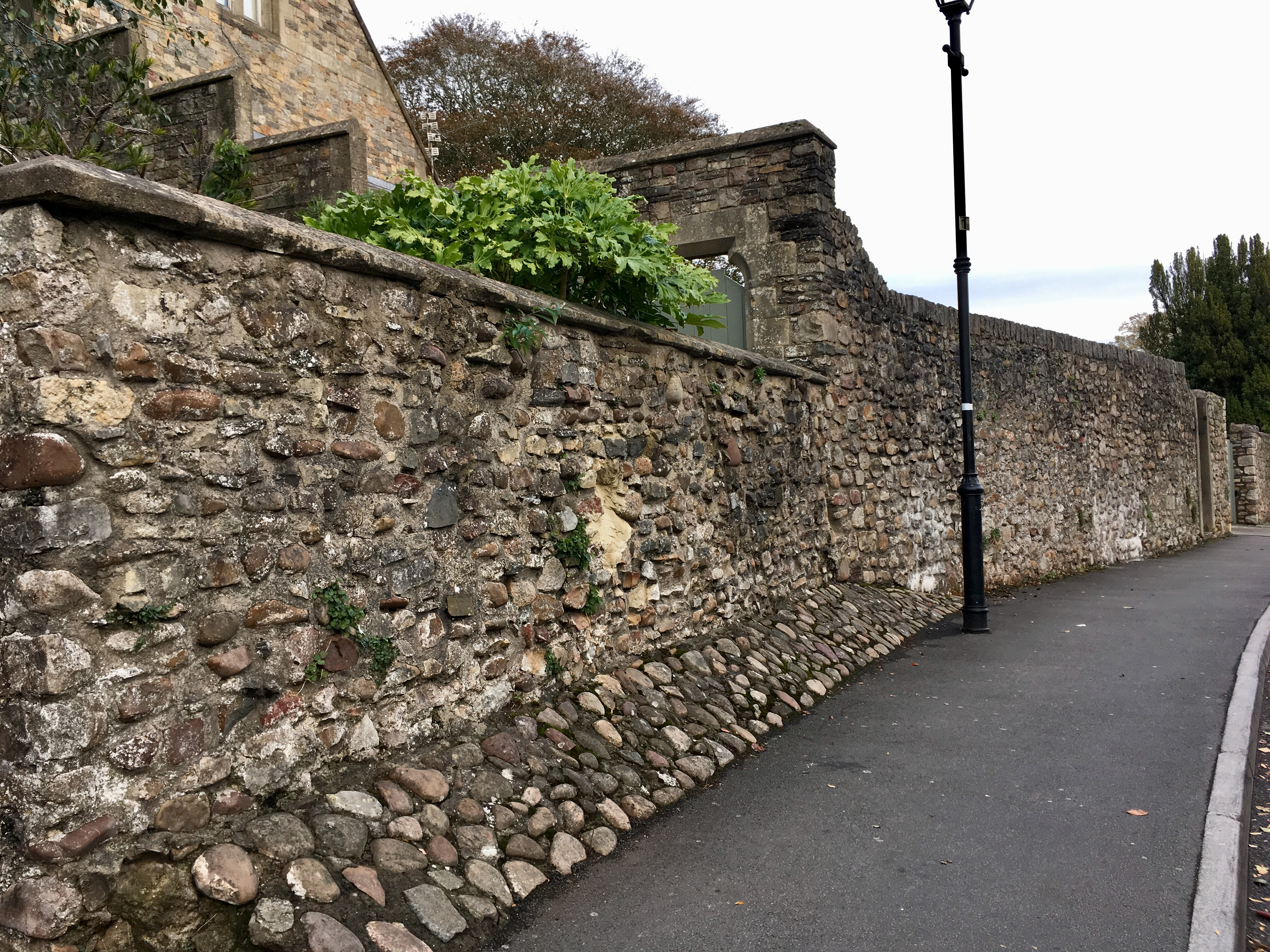
The side wall of St Cross

== See also ==
- Llandaff
- Church in Wales
- Gothic Revival architecture
