= St Andrew, Llandaff =

House in Cardiff, Wales

St Andrew
- 1 High Street
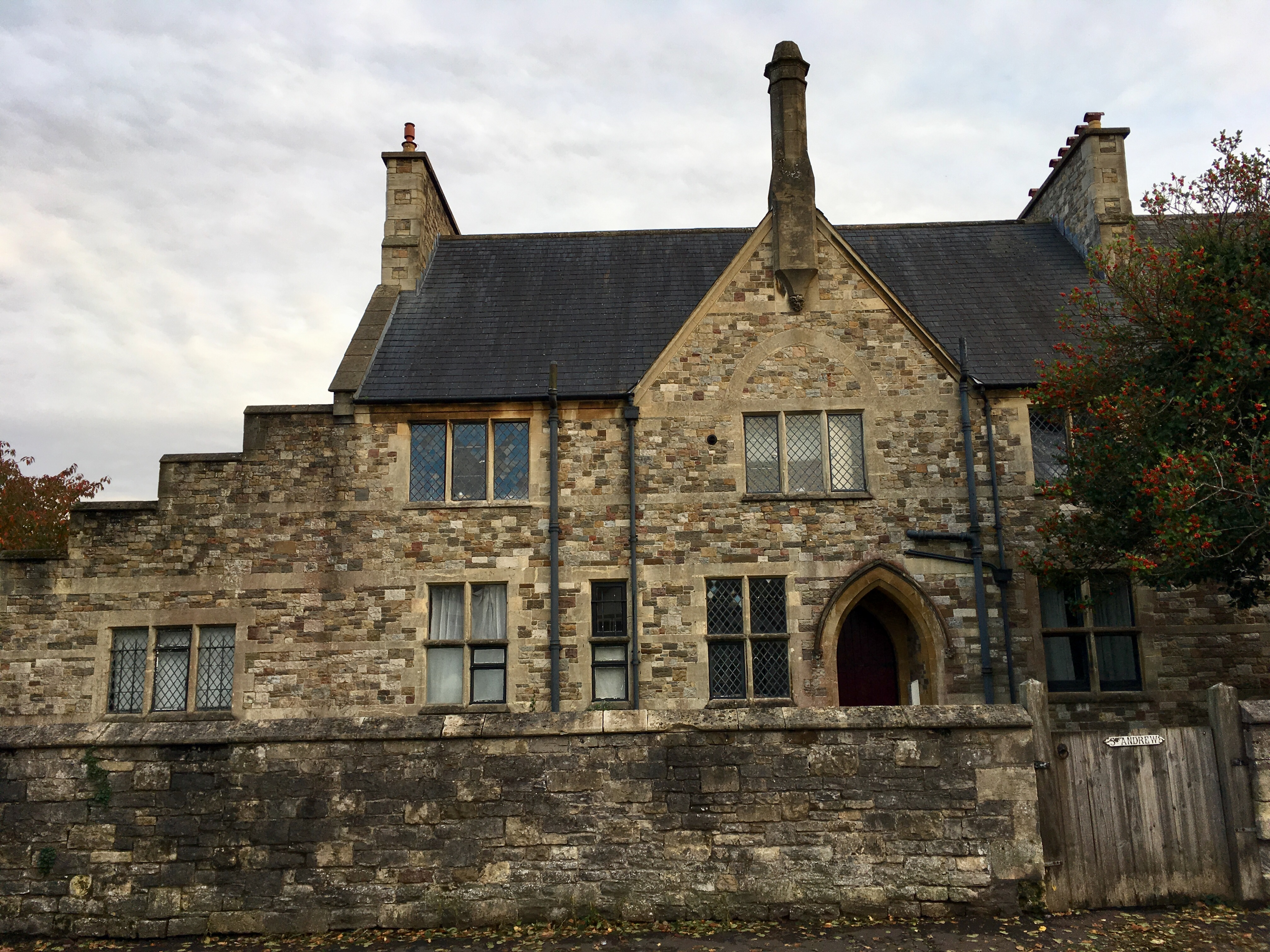
- St Andrew

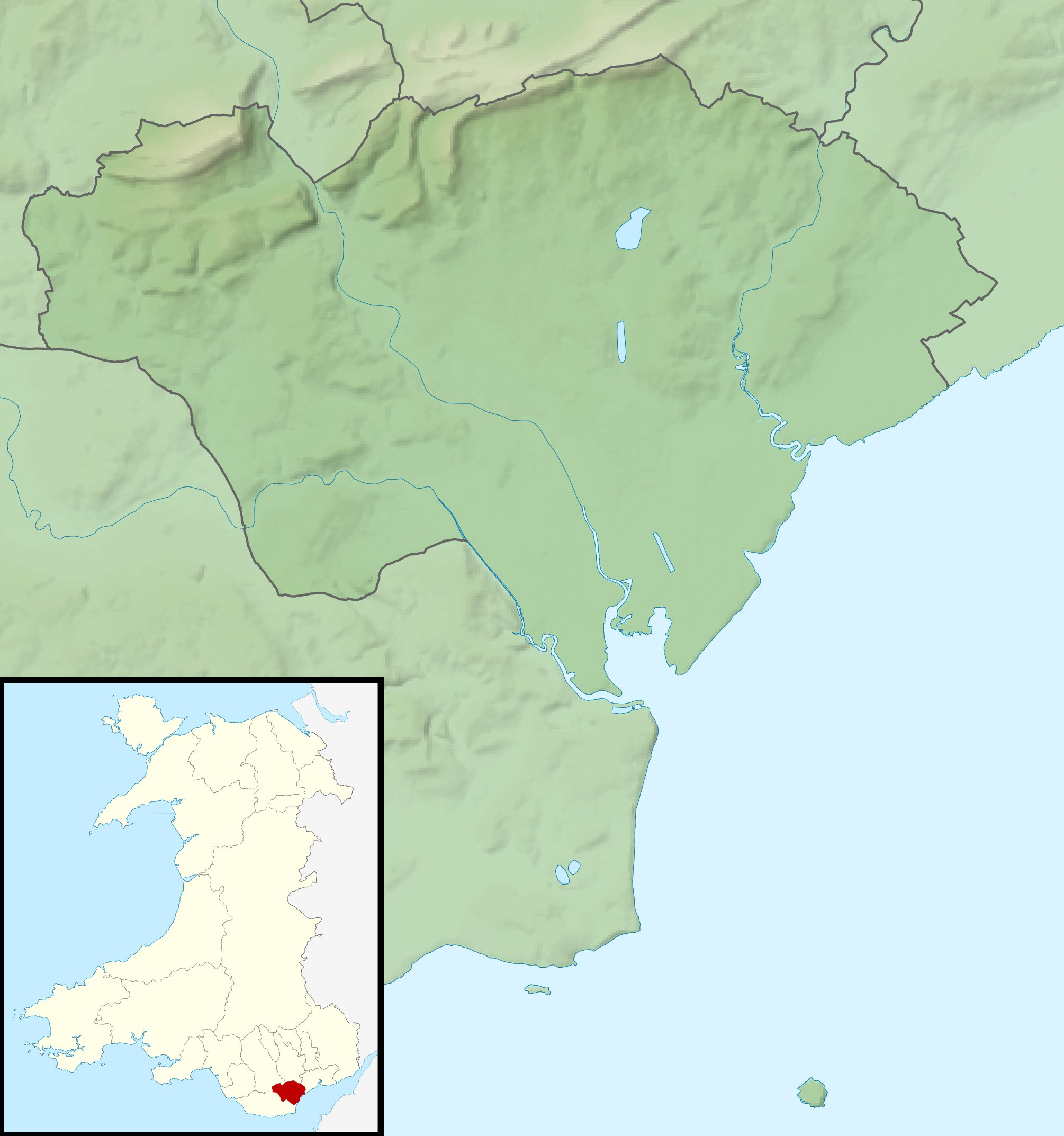
- Location in Cardiff and Wales
- 51.49443°N 3.2182°W
- Type: Private residential house
- Location: Cardiff

History
- Built: 1859-61

Site notes
- Area: Llandaff
- Architect: Ewan Christian
- Architectural style: Restrained Gothic style

Listed Building – Grade II
- Official name: St. Andrew
- Designated: 19 May 1975; 51 years ago
- Reference no.: 13730

Listed Building – Grade II
- Official name: Garden Wall of St. Andrew
- Designated: 19 May 1975; 51 years ago
- Reference no.: 13731

St Andrew, with the address of 1 High Street, is a 19th-century residential building in Llandaff, Cardiff, Wales. The building is a two-storey Grade II listed structure and it was listed because it is "Included as an unaltered design by Ewan Christian and for its group value with the other listed buildings around the Cathedral Green and on the High Street". The garden wall of St Andrew is also a Grade II structure.

== History ==
The building was built between 1859 and 1861 by Ewan Christian, who was the architect for the Ecclesiastical Commissioners. It is a left-hand house with its neighbour being St Cross. Both semi-detached houses were built for minor canons of Llandaff Cathedral. It was built with multi-coloured stones, both square or rectangular in shape, and with Bath stone, ashlar dressings and Welsh slate roof. The buildings match Cathedral Court on the other side of the cathedral green, which Christian designed as the deanery. John Newman, in his Glamorgan volume of the Pevsner Buildings of Wales series, notes St Andrew's “engaging corbelled chimneystacks”.

It was later occupied by Sir Tasker Watkins VC and his family. On 16 August 2019, a Blue Plaque was unveiled on the building to commemorate Sir Tasker Watkins' association with Llandaff, and the house that he lived in between 1945 and 1955.

In October 2022, the house was put up for sale for £1 million by the representative body of the Church in Wales.

== Garden wall of St Andrew ==
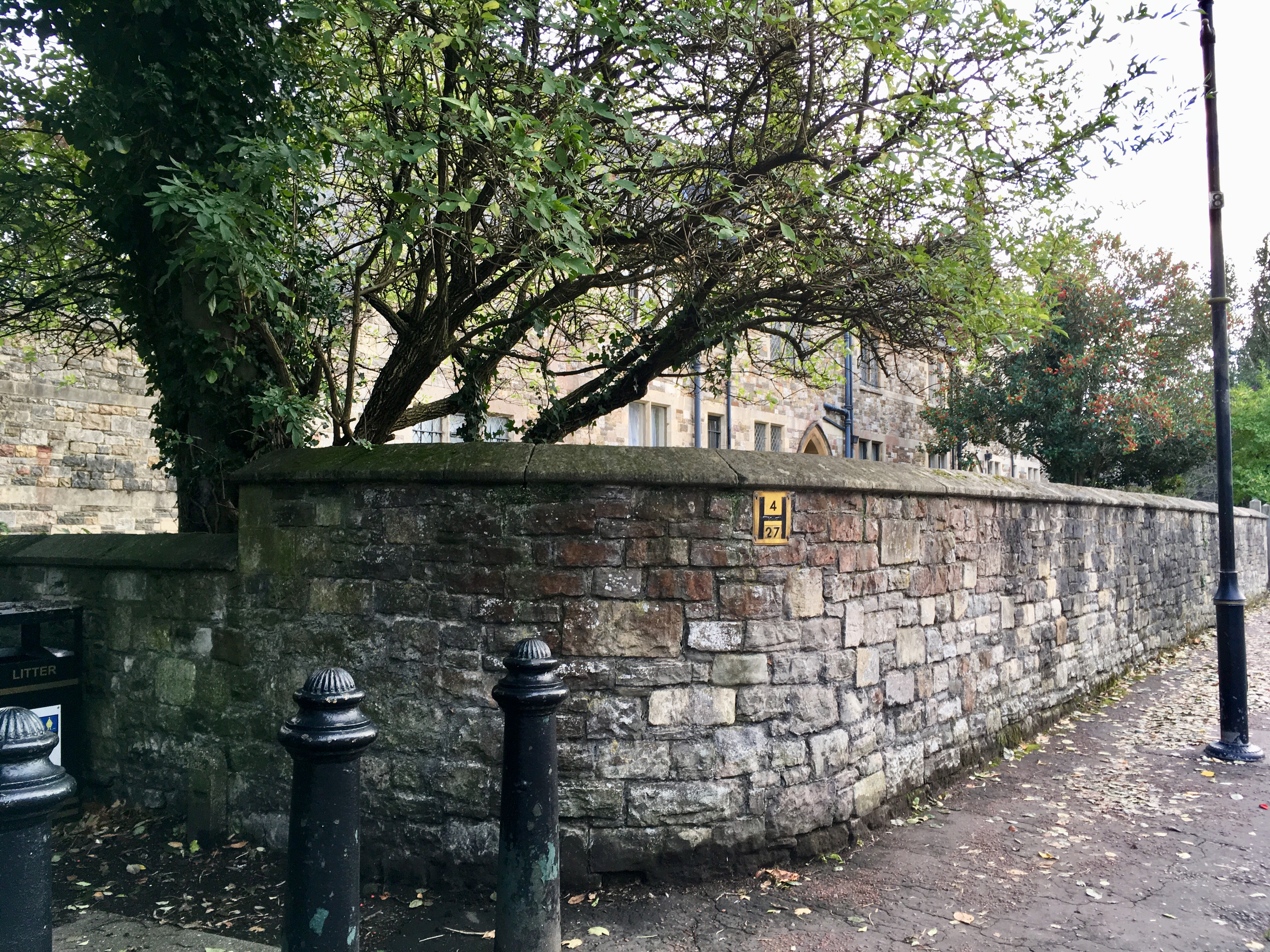
The front wall of St Andrew

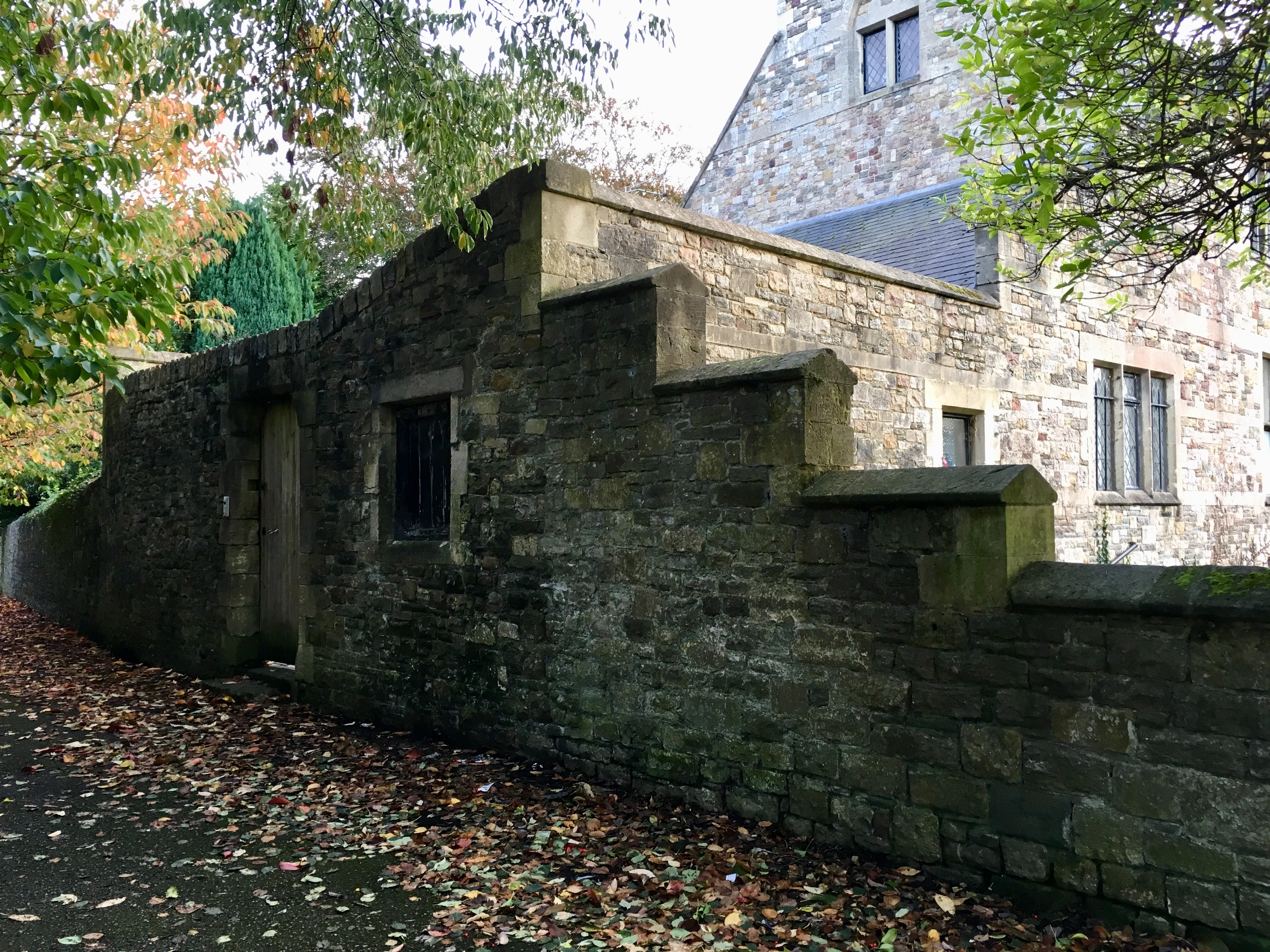
The side gate wall of St Andrew
