= 6 High Street, Llandaff =

Building in Llandaff, Cardiff, Wales

6 High Street
- Jaspers Tea Rooms
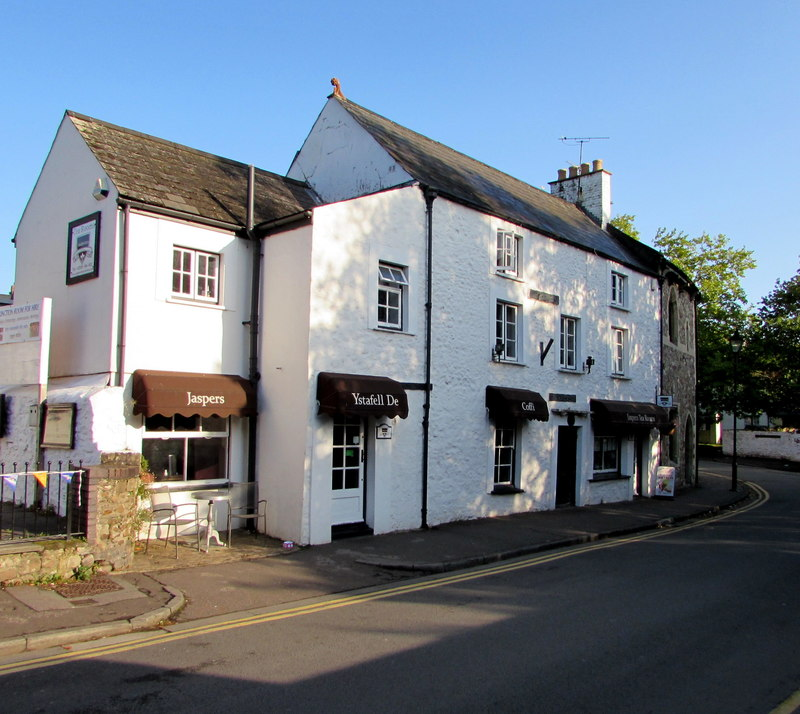

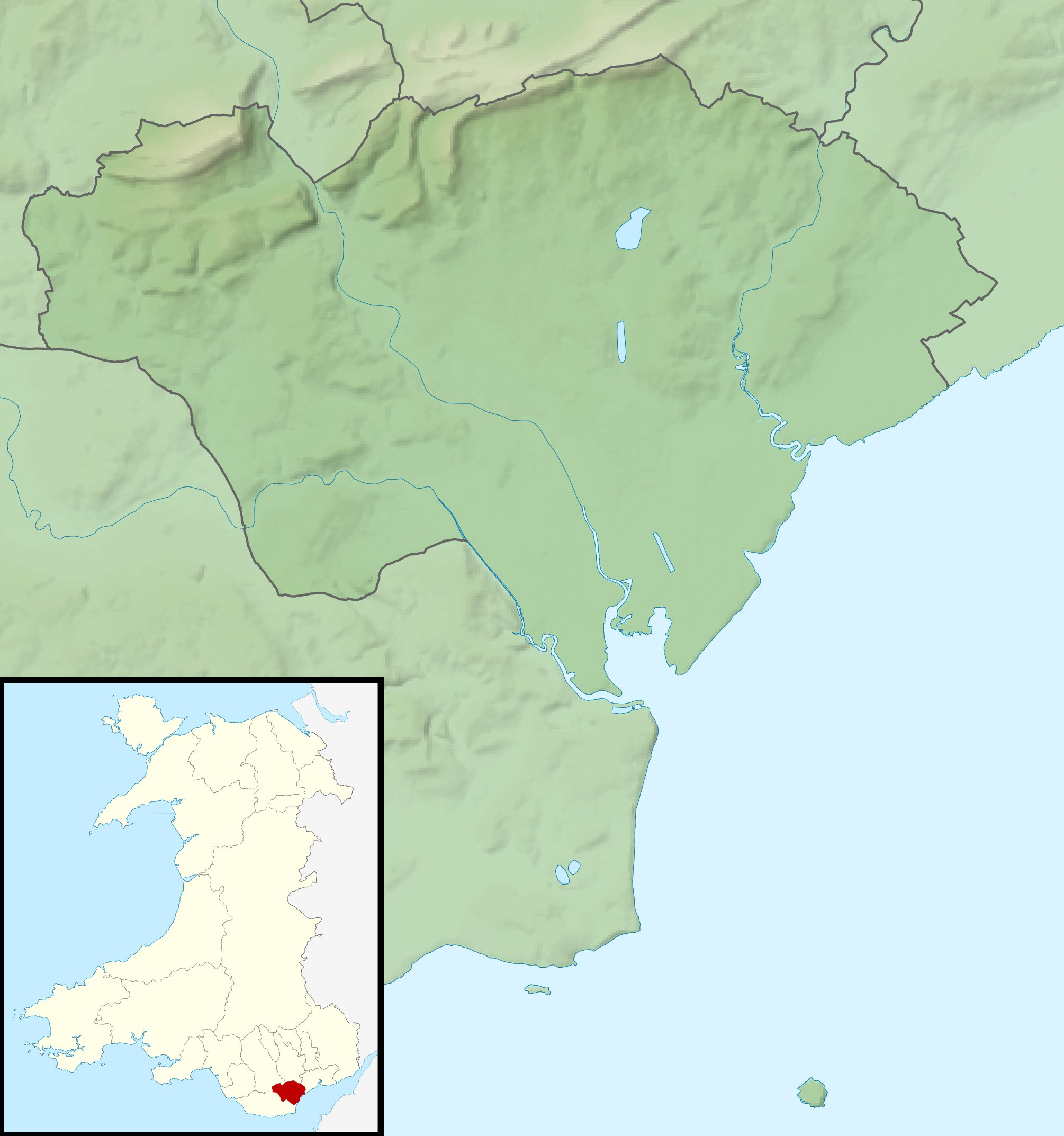
- Location in Cardiff and Wales
- 51.4946°N 3.2184°W

Listed Building – Grade II
- Official name: No.6 High Street, Llandaff
- Designated: 19 May 1975
- Reference no.: 13734

6 High Street is an 18th-century building in Llandaff, Cardiff, Wales. It was possibly built as a one and a half storey building in the early 18th century of thick rubble masonry and in c. 1840 was extended to a three-storey building. It is thought to have been part of the old farm on The Cathedral Green, Llandaff, which was demolished in the early 19th century. Today the building is a teahouse. The building is a Grade II listed structure and it was listed because it is "Included as a largely C18 house and for its group value with the other listed buildings around The Cathedral Green and on the High Street."
