= Llandaff =

District and community of Cardiff, Wales

Llandaff: Welsh: Llandaf
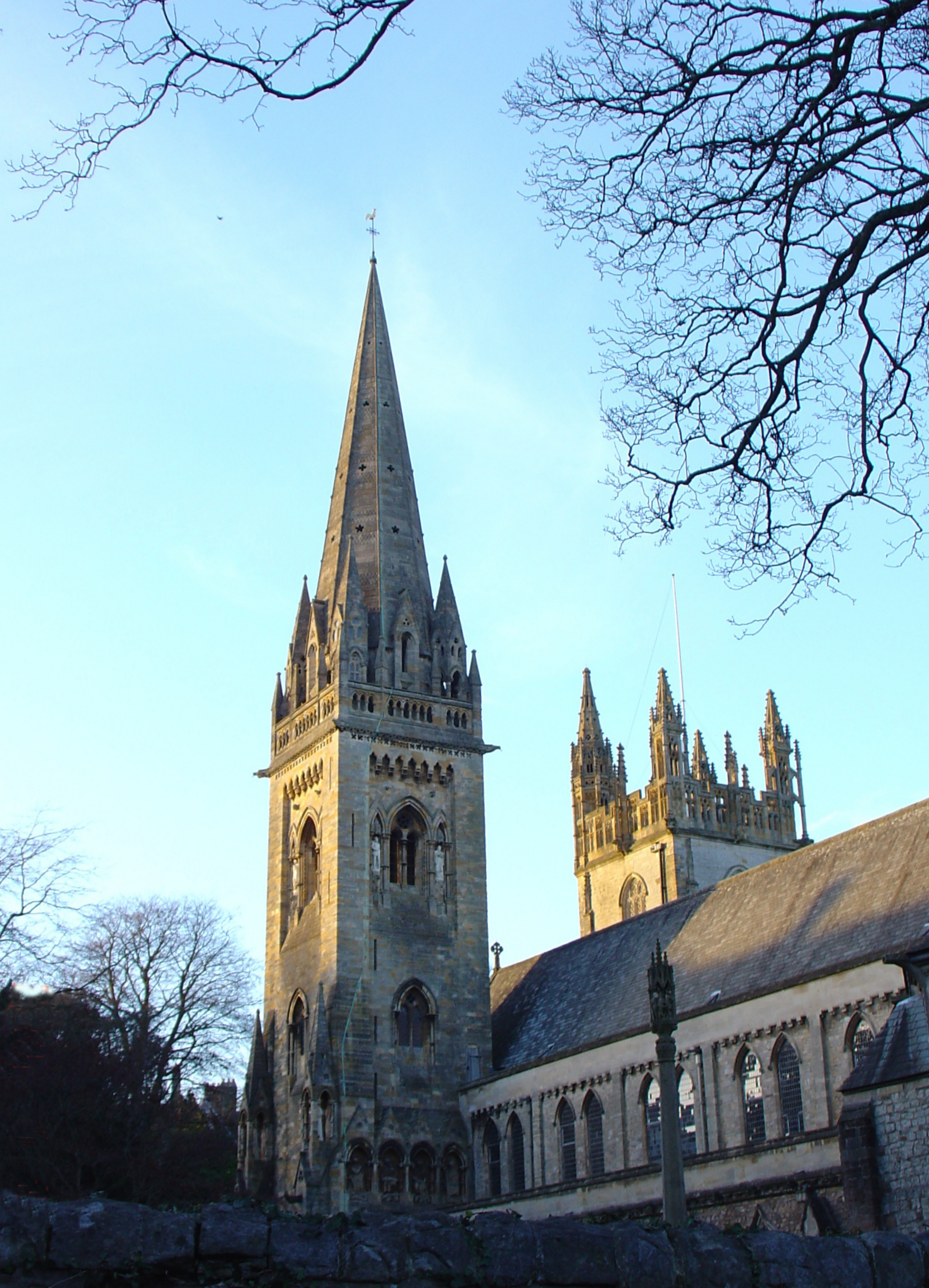
- Llandaff Cathedral

- Location within Cardiff
- Population: 8,997 (2011)
- Community: Llandaff
- Principal area: Cardiff
- Preserved county: South Glamorgan
- Country: Wales
- Sovereign state: United Kingdom
- Post town: CARDIFF
- Postcode district: CF5
- Dialling code: 029
- Police: South Wales
- Fire: South Wales
- Ambulance: Welsh
- UK Parliament: Cardiff West
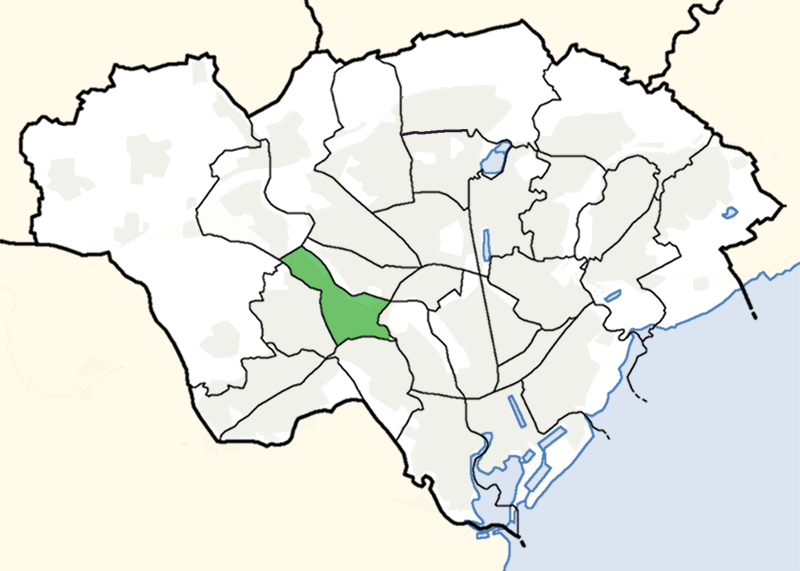
- List of places UK Wales Cardiff 51°29′36″N 3°12′48″W

Llandaff (/lænˈdæf/; Welsh: Llandaf [ɬanˈdaːv]; from llan 'church' and Taf) is a district, community and coterminous electoral ward in the north of Cardiff, capital of Wales. It was incorporated into the city in 1922. It is the seat of the Bishop of Llandaff, whose diocese within the Church in Wales covers the most populous area of Wales.

== History ==
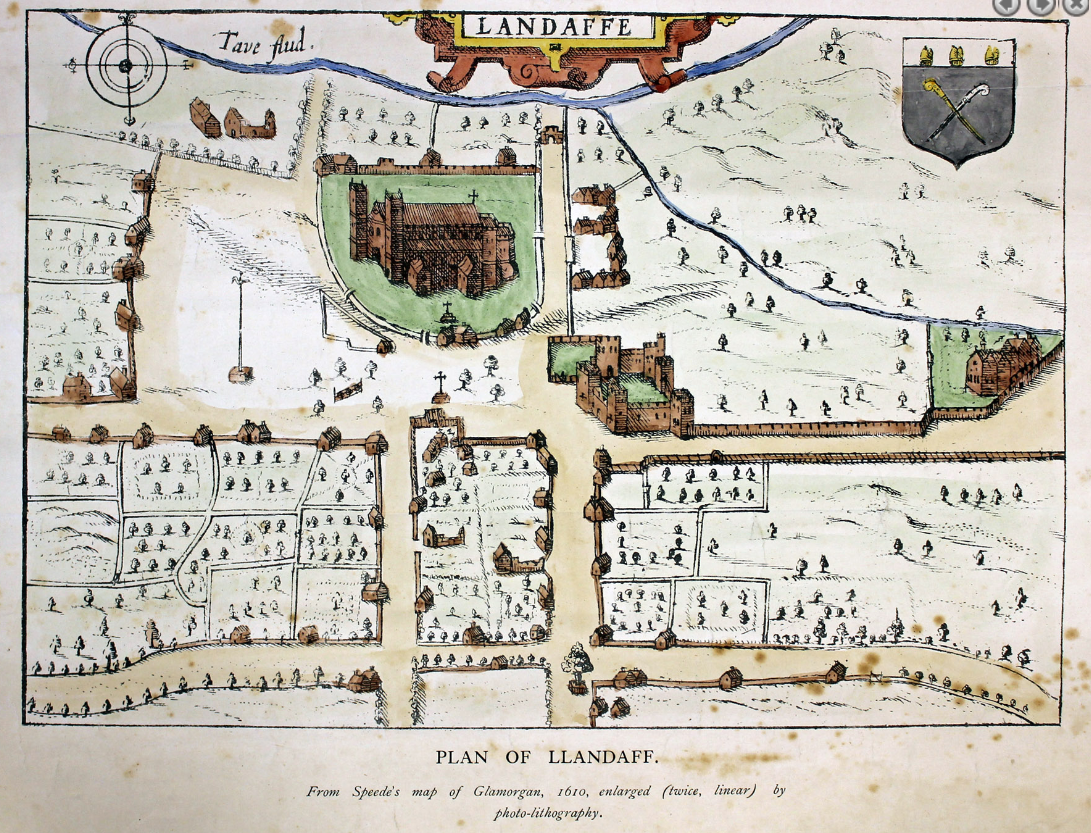
John Speed's map of Llandaff (Landaffe) in 1610

Most of the history of Llandaff centres on its role as a religious site. Before the creation of Llandaff Cathedral, it became established as a Christian place of worship in the 6th century AD, probably because of its location as the first firm ground north of the point where the river Taff met the Bristol Channel, and because of its pre-Christian location as a river crossing on a north–south trade route. Evidence of Romano-British ritual burials have been found under the present cathedral. The date of the moving of the cathedral to Llandaff is disputed, but elements of the fabric date from the 12th century, such as the impressive Romanesque Urban Arch, named after the 12th century Bishop, Urban. It has had a history of continual destruction and restoration, as a result of warfare, neglect, and natural disaster. Llandaff has been a focal point of devastating attacks by Owain Glyndŵr and Oliver Cromwell. It was the second most damaged cathedral in the UK (after Coventry Cathedral), following Luftwaffe bombing during World War II, and subsequently restored by the architect George Pace. One of its main modern points of interest is the aluminium figure of Christ in Majesty (1954–5), by Jacob Epstein, which is suspended above the nave. In 2007, a lightning strike to its spire sent a surge through the building; which destroyed its organ. Its replacement, the largest to be built in the UK for over 40 years, was inaugurated in 2010.

Bishop's Palace
(Llandaff Castle or Bishop's Castle)

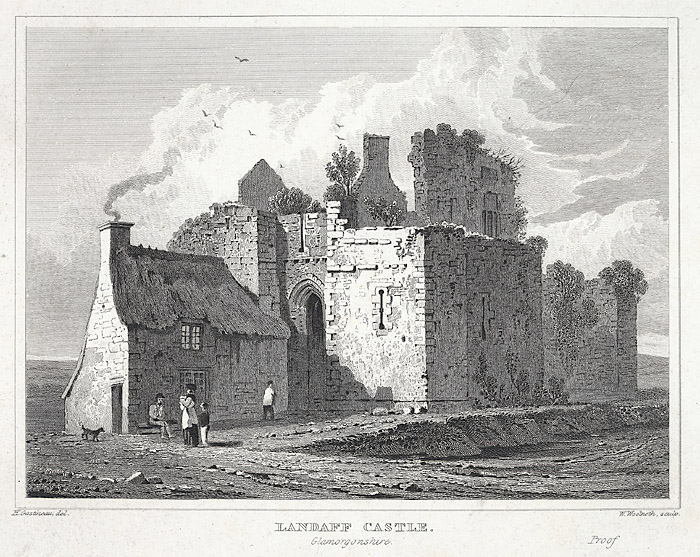
1823

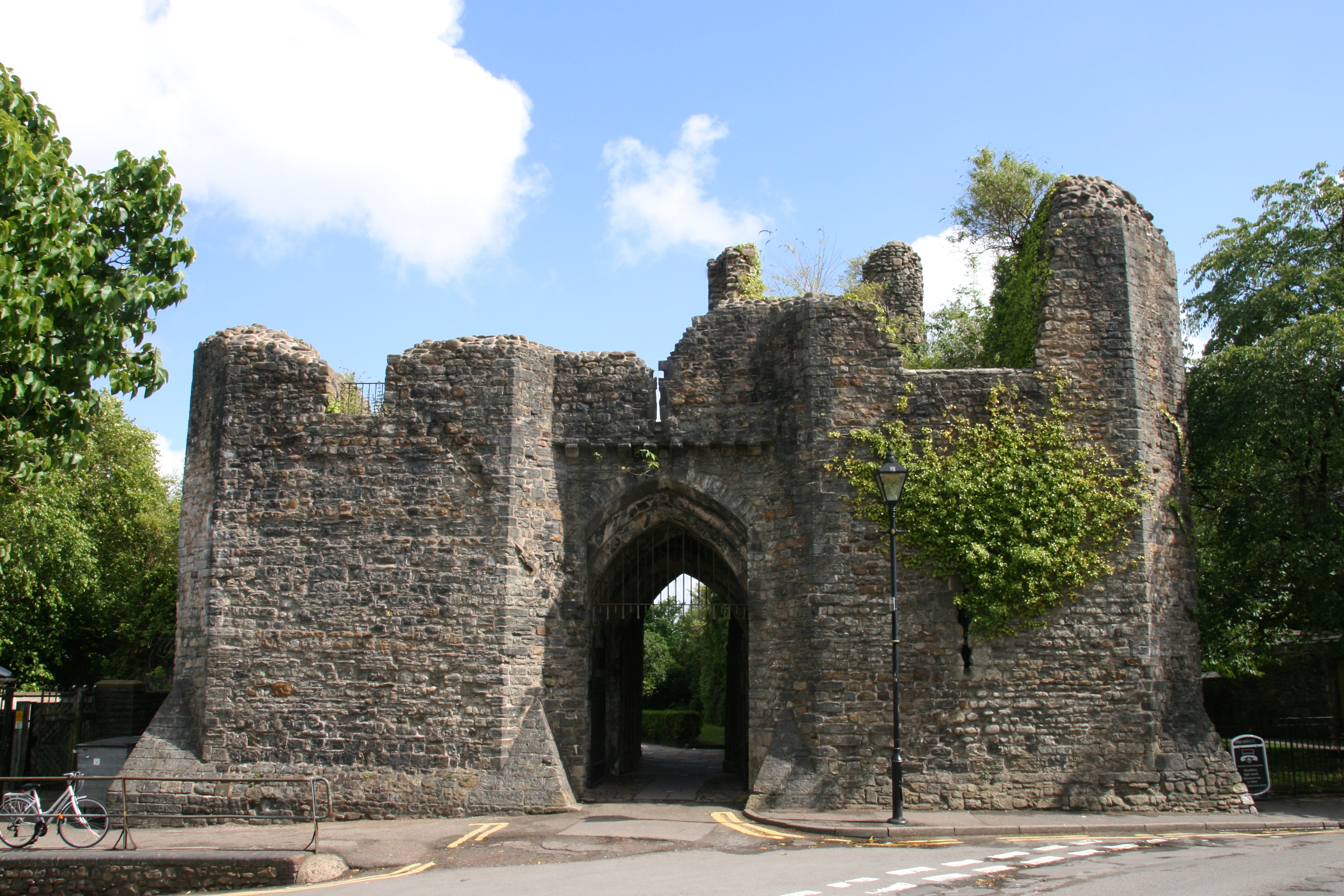
2011

The Bishop's Palace, also known as Llandaff Castle or Bishop's Castle now in ruins, lies to the south of the cathedral. It is believed it was constructed at a similar date to Caerphilly Castle, in the late 13th century. It is also believed it was abandoned after being attacked and damaged by Glyndŵr in the 15th century. The gatehouse of the Palace survives, and the courtyard is now a public garden.

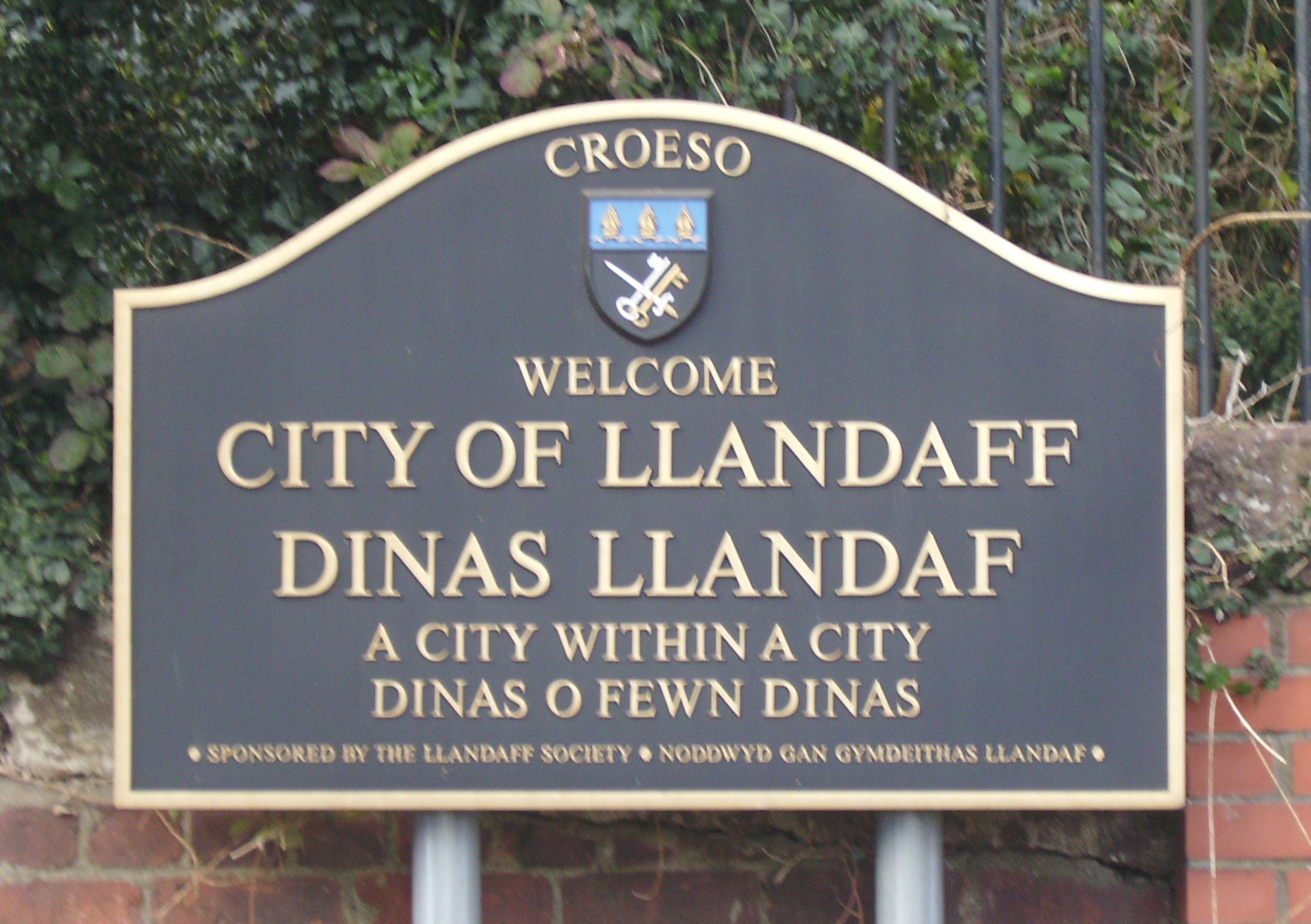
Sign entering Llandaff.

Llandaff never developed into a chartered borough, and by the 19th century, was described as "reduced to a mere village... It consists of little more than two short streets of cottages, not lighted or paved, terminating in a square, into which the great gateway of the old palace formerly opened, and where are still several genteel houses."

Historically, Llandaff was informally known as a 'city', because of its status as the seat of the Bishop of Llandaff. This city status was never officially recognised, largely because the community did not possess a charter of incorporation. The ancient parish of Llandaff included a wide area. Apart from Llandaff itself, it included the townships of Canton, Ely, Fairwater, and Gabalfa.

During the development of the South Wales coalfield and Cardiff Docks, the parish was gradually absorbed into the Borough of Cardiff during the 19th and 20th centuries. Seen as a clean and green up-market countrified village location close to the fast developing city, many of the better-off coal merchants and business people chose to live in Llandaff, including the Insole family. The house now known as Insole Court dates originally from 1856. Llandaff itself became a civil parish, and from 1894 to 1922, was part of the Llandaff and Dinas Powis Rural District. On 9 November 1922, the county borough of Cardiff was extended to include the area.

=== 1952 mid-air collision ===
On Monday 14 July 1952 at 1.15pm, two de Havilland Vampire aircraft from RAF Merryfield, of 208 Advanced Flying School, collided in mid-air at 29,000 ft. One Vampire, VF265, went straight through a three-storey building next to the Llandaff Hotel, to the basement, killing a 53 year old woman. Another Vampire, TG297, crashed in Pontcanna Fields & Llandaff Fields.

Pilot Officer G H Patterson, from the VF265 aircraft, from Houghton-le-Spring, landed in the middle of Cardiff Airport, and walked to Cardiff Aeroplane Club. Pilot Officer B F Shaw, from the TG297 aircraft, from West Sussex, landed in the River Rumney.

== Demography ==
At the United Kingdom Census 2011, the population of the Llandaff was 8,997; of whom 4,309 were male, and 4,688 female. 91.6% were recorded as being of various white ethnicities. Approximately 65% of the population were returned as Christian, with about 1.5% each being Hindu or Muslim, and 30% having no religion or no stated religion.

=== Welsh language ===
In the 2011 census, 15.3% of the population over 3 years old in Llandaff were recorded as speaking Welsh, or 1,337 people. This was a small drop compared to the 2001 census figure, which was 15.4%.

Broadcasting House in Llandaff was the headquarters of BBC Cymru Wales until it relocated to Central Square in Cardiff between October 2019 and July 2020.

Research by Owen John Thomas shows the historical strength of the Welsh language in Llandaff. According to his book Yr Iaith Gymraeg yng Nghaerdydd c. 1800–1914 (The Welsh language in Cardiff c. 1800–1914), the nonconformist church in Cardiff Road was a Welsh-language church in 1813. His work also shows that Welsh was the main language of the street in Llandaff in the 17th century.

== Governance ==
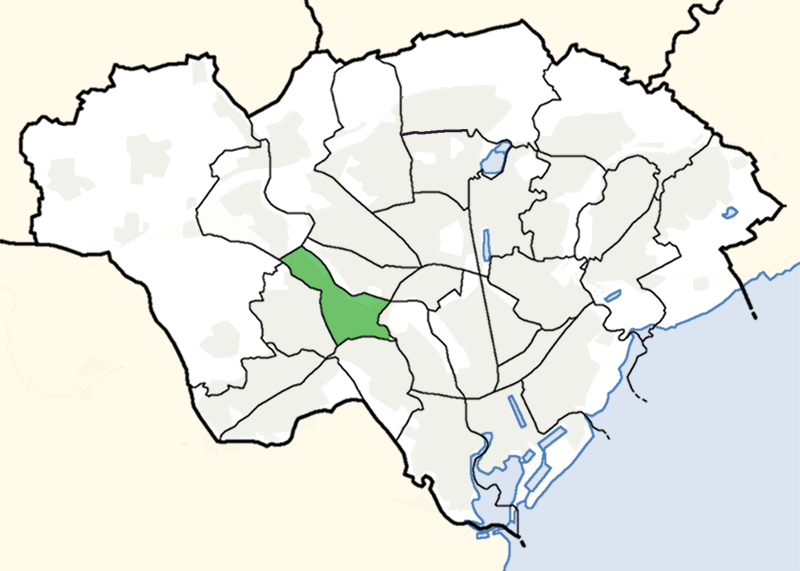
Llandaff electoral ward of Cardiff

Llandaff is both an electoral ward, and a community (Welsh: cymuned) of the City of Cardiff. There is no community council for the area. The electoral ward of Llandaff is bounded by Radyr & Morganstown to the north west; Llandaff North to the north; Riverside to the south east; Canton to the south; and Fairwater to the west. The ward is represented by two councillors on Cardiff Council, Sean Driscoll and Peter Huw Jenkins, the former is a member of the Conservative Party, the latter is a member of the Labour Party.

In the UK Parliament, Llandaff is part of the constituency of Cardiff West. Its most prominent MPs were former Speaker of the House of Commons; George Thomas, and former First Minister of Wales and Welsh Labour Party leader Rhodri Morgan.

In the Senedd, Llandaff is part of the constituency of Cardiff West, whose MS since 2011 is Mark Drakeford of Labour; he succeeded Rhodri Morgan upon the latter's retirement. The constituency is within the electoral region of South Wales Central, whose four current MSs are Conservatives Andrew RT Davies and Joel James; Plaid Cymru's Rhys ab Owen and Heledd Fychan.

== Education ==
=== Higher education ===
- Cardiff Metropolitan University, Llandaff campus
- St. Michael's College, Anglican theological college

=== State secondary schools ===
- Bishop of Llandaff Church in Wales High School, comprehensive, English medium.
- Ysgol Gyfun Gymraeg Glantaf (serving Llandaff, but located in Llandaff North), Welsh medium.

=== State primary schools ===
- Danescourt Primary School, English medium.
- Llandaff City Church in Wales Primary School, English medium.
- Ysgol Pencae, Welsh medium.

=== Independent schools ===
- The Cathedral School, ages 3–18 co-educational, English medium.
- Howell's School, ages 3–18 girls, with co-educational sixth form, English medium.

== Transport ==
Llandaff is served by railway stations at Danescourt, Fairwater, and Waun-Gron Park; each is about a mile from the cathedral. There is a half-hourly service to and from Cardiff on the Cardiff City Line. Llandaf railway station is located in Llandaff North.

Cardiff Bus services 1/2 (City Circle), 24/25 (Whitchurch), 62/63 (Radyr/Morganstown), 64/65 (Heath Hospital/Llanrumney), 66 (Danescourt), and Stagecoach service 122 (Tonypandy) operate through the area to/from Cardiff city centre.

Western Avenue (A48) runs through the south of the area, heading eastbound to Gabalfa and M4 J29, and westbound to Ely, Culverhouse Cross, and M4 J33. Cardiff Road leads south towards Cardiff city centre.

== Economy ==
The major employment sectors in the area are:

- Education (16.2%)
- Human health and social work activities (13.8%)
- Wholesale and retail trade; repair of motor vehicles and motor cycles (11.3%)
- Public administration and defence (9.6%)
- Professional, scientific and technical activities (8.9%)
- Other services (6.2%)
- Construction (6.1%)
- Information and communication (5.6%)
- Banking, finance and insurance (5.3%)
- Accommodation and food service activities (4.3%)
- Manufacturing (4%)

Broadcasting House, formerly the headquarters of BBC Cymru Wales, was opened in Llandaff in 1966. BBC Cymru Wales moved to new facilities at Central Square, Cardiff in 2020, with the remaining Llandaff site due for housing development.

== Doctor Who ==
Following its revival in 2005, the long-running science-fiction television series Doctor Who was produced by BBC Wales in Llandaff. Production was relocated to the BBC's new Roath Lock studios in Cardiff Bay in 2012. The location scenes of four episodes were filmed in Llandaff:

- "Human Nature" (2007)
- "The Family of Blood" (2007)
- "The Eleventh Hour" (2010)
- "Vincent and the Doctor" (2010)

== Llandaff Festival ==
The Llandaff Cathedral Festival was founded in 1958 and ran annually until 1986. It played an important role in Welsh (and Cardiff) music before the building of St David's Hall in 1982, commissioning large orchestral and choral works (from Alun Hoddinott, Arwel Hughes, Daniel Jones, Norman Kay, William Mathias, Grace Williams and others) and attracting international soloists for chamber music and piano recitals. The event was briefly revived between 2008 and 2013. After a gap of nine years the festival was revived once again in 2022 as a four day event, and has been held annually since then.

== Notable people ==
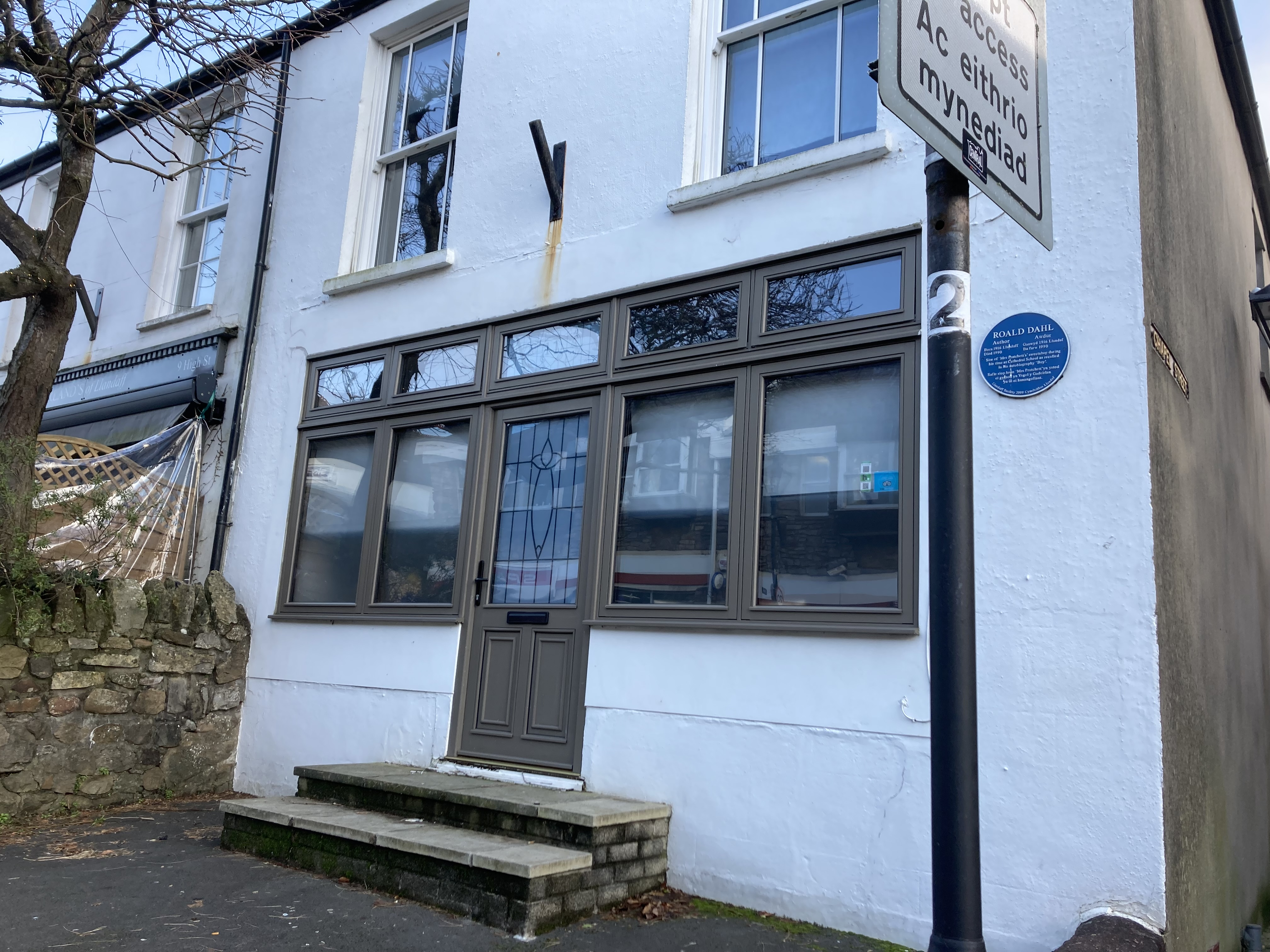
"Mrs Pratchett's" former sweet shop at 11 High Street in Llandaff, Cardiff has a blue plaque commemorating the mischief a young Roald Dahl played on her by putting a mouse in the gobstoppers jar.

- Sir Ivor Atkins (1869–1953), choirmaster and organist; was born in Llandaff.
- James Dean Bradfield (born 1969), singer, guitarist and songwriter with the Manic Street Preachers
- Charlotte Church (born 1986), singer and television presenter; was born in Llandaff, and attended Howell's School.
- Roald Dahl (1916–1990), author; was born in Llandaff, and attended the Cathedral School.
- Cheryl Gillan (1952–2021), Secretary of State for Wales (2010–2012); was born in Llandaff.
- Francis Lewis (1713–1802), one of the signatories of the United States Declaration of Independence.
- Sir David Mathew (Dafydd ap Mathew) (1400–1484), was a Welsh Knight. He was Lord of Llandaff and Seneschal of Llandaff Cathedral, and one of the ten Great Barons of Glamorgan, a Marcher Lord. Standard Bearer of England to Edward IV; fought in the Battle of Towton, and is credited for saving King Edward IV's life, and granted the right to use 'Towton' on the Mathew Family arms. His tomb is in Llandaff Cathedral.
- Terry Nation (1930−1997), television scriptwriter was born in Llandaff, wrote seventy Doctor Who episodes, and created the Daleks. He also created the BBC series Blake's 7 and Survivors and wrote a number of episodes for Lew Grade's ITC Entertainment show The Saint.
- Ivor Williams (1908–1982), artist; lived and painted in Llandaff.
